= List of Argentine sportspeople =

This is a list of people from Argentina involved in sports or athletics.

== Athletics ==
=== Short-distance running ===
- Juan Carlos Anderson
- Tomás Beswick
- Alberto Biedermann
- Gerardo Bönnhoff
- Federico Brewster
- Otto Diesch
- Guillermo Evans
- Carlos Hofmeister
- Guillermo Newberry
- Juan Carlos Zabala

=== Long-distance running ===
- Delfo Cabrera
- Griselda González
- Reinaldo Gorno
- Armando Sensini
- Osvaldo Suárez
- Eulalio Muñoz

=== Other fields ===
- Enrico Barney, pole vault
- Luis Brunetto, triple jump
- Juan Carlos Dyrzka, hurdling
- Alejandra García, pole vault
- Juan Kahnert, shot put
- Enrique Kistenmacher, decathlete
- Federico Kleger, hammer throw
- Günther Kruse, discus throw
- Estanislao Kocourek, hurdling
- Ingeborg Pfüller, discus and shot put
- Pablo Pietrobelli, javelin throw
- Leonardo Price, middle-distance running
- Noemí Simonetto, long jump
- Tito Steiner, decathlete
- Enrique Thompson, hurdling
- Guillermo Weller, racewalking
- Solange Witteveen, high jump

== Basketball ==
- Facundo Campazzo, point guard
- Carlos Delfino, small forward / shooting guard
- Gabriel Fernández, power forward / center
- Óscar Furlong, power forward / center
- Manu Ginóbili, shooting guard
- Leonardo Gutiérrez, power forward
- Walter Herrmann, small forward
- María Itatí Castaldi, Paralympian
- Nicolás Laprovíttola, point guard
- Alejandro Montecchia, point guard
- Andrés Nocioni, small forward / power forward
- Fabricio Oberto, center / power forward
- Pablo Prigioni, point guard
- Juan Ignacio Sánchez, point guard
- Luis Scola, power forward
- Hugo Sconochini, shooting guard / small forward
- Ezequiel Skverer, point guard
- Joaquin Szuchman, shooting guard
- Rubén Wolkowyski, center

== Boxing ==
- Carlos Baldomir
- Roberto Bolonti
- Ringo Bonavena
- Américo Bonetti
- Brian Castaño
- Miguel Ángel Castellini
- Jorge Castro
- Juan Martín Coggi
- Eduardo Corletti
- Carolina Duer, world champion
- Luis Firpo
- Víctor Galíndez
- José María Gatica
- José Giorgetti
- Nestor Hipolito Giovannini
- Mario Guilloti
- Santos Laciar
- Raúl Landini
- Jorge Miguel Maglioni
- Carlos Monzón
- Pascual Pérez
- Pedro Quartucci
- Cristian Rodríguez
- Marcos Sarfatti
- Carmelo Tomaselli

== Cycling ==
- Jorge Bátiz
- Juan Curuchet
- Daniel Díaz
- Darío Díaz
- Sebastián Donadío
- Juan Pablo Dotti
- Ricardo Escuela
- Juan Antonio Flecha
- Jorge Gaday
- Lucas Gaday
- Jorge Giacinti
- Emanuel Guevara
- Juan José Haedo
- Lucas Sebastián Haedo
- Emiliano Ibarra
- Daniel Juárez
- Gabriel Juárez
- Alfredo Lucero
- Héctor Lucero
- Matías Médici
- Jorge Martín Montenegro
- Luciano Montivero
- Enzo Moyano
- Mauricio Muller
- Gonzalo Najar
- Nicolás Naranjo
- Walter Pérez
- Jorge Pi
- Rubén Ramos
- Adrián Richeze
- Mauro Richeze
- Maximiliano Richeze
- Roberto Richeze
- Laureano Rosas
- Eduardo Sepúlveda
- Catriel Soto
- Nicolás Tivani

== Field hockey ==
- Magdalena Aicega
- Luciana Aymar
- Noel Barrionuevo
- Soledad García
- María de la Paz Hernández
- Giselle Kañevsky
- Mercedes Margalot
- Karina Masotta
- Joaquín Menini
- Vanina Oneto
- Carla Rebecchi
- Cecilia Rognoni
- Lucas Rossi
- Belén Succi

== Football ==
=== A ===
- Gustavo Acosta
- Sergio Agüero
- Pablo Aimar
- Nicolás Andereggen
- Mariano Andújar
- Osvaldo Ardiles
- Germán Alecha
- Mariano Almandoz
- Rodrigo Alonso
- Juan Alvacete
- Estela Álvarez, referee
- Nicolás Amerise
- Gustavo Antoun
- Raúl Antuña
- Ricky Aramendi
- Ariel Aranda
- Daniel Aráoz
- Lautaro Arellano
- Alberto Argañaraz
- Andrés Ariaudo
- Franco Armani
- Julio César Armentia
- Ezequiel Arriola
- Jonathan Artura
- Franco Ascencio
- Fabián Assmann
- Mauro Astrada
- Carlos Dario Aurelio
- Adrian Ávalos

=== B ===
- Carlos Babington
- Tomás Badaloni
- Javier Baena
- Héctor Baillié
- Mateo Bajamich
- Héctor Baley
- Oscar Baquela
- Ramón Bareiro
- Osvaldo Barsottini
- Miguel Ángel Basualdo
- Alfio Basile, coach
- Roberto Basílico
- Roberto Bassaletti
- Damián Batallini
- Gabriel Batistuta
- Sebastián Battaglia
- Cristian Battocchio
- Mariano Peralta Bauer
- Julio Bayón
- Pablo Becker
- Patricio Bedrossian
- Walter Behrens
- José Bellingi
- Enzo Benítez
- Daniel Bertoni
- Gonzalo Bettini
- Luis Bevacqua
- Adrián Bianchi
- Carlos Bianchi, coach
- Marcelo Bielsa, coach
- Carlos Bilardo, coach
- Agustín Bindella
- Ricardo Bochini
- John Bocwinski
- Gastón Bojanich
- Mario Bolatti
- Federico Bongioanni
- Juan Manuel Bordaberry
- Martín Bordonaro
- Jonathan Bottinelli
- Agustín Bouzat
- Gonzalo Bozzoni
- Daniel Brailovski, midfielder
- Mauro Brandoni
- Néstor Breitenbruch
- Norberto Briasco
- Claudio Brizuela
- Rubén Norberto Bruno
- José Luis Brown
- Jorge Brown
- Andrés Bullentini
- Roque Burella

=== C ===
- Juan Pablo Cabaña
- Maximiliano Cabaña
- Juan Martín Cadelago
- Esteban Cambiasso
- Mauro Camoranessi
- Cristian Campestrini
- Daniel Cangialosi
- Claudio Caniggia
- Andres Cantor, announcer
- Federico Capece
- Walter Capozucchi
- Denis Caputo
- Luciano Cardenali
- Daniel Carrara
- Luis María Carregado
- Vitor Castro de Souza
- Lucas Castromán
- Agustín Cattaneo
- Leonardo Cauteruchi
- Fernando Cavenaghi
- Mariano Celasco
- Paulo Centurión
- Ezequiel Cerutti
- Daniel Alberto Chafer
- Matías Chiacchio
- Claudio Chena
- Carlos Cinalli
- Luciano Cipriani
- Néstor Clausen
- Javier Claut
- Roberto Coll
- Matías Coloca
- Fabricio Coloccini
- Gabriel Colombatti
- Andrés Colombo
- Juan Pablo Compagnucci
- Enzo Copetti
- Hugo Corbalán
- Ezequiel Córdoba
- Eduardo Cremasco
- Hernán Crespo
- Hector Cribioli
- Emanuel Croce
- Ernesto Cucchiaroni
- Héctor Cúper, manager
- Darío Cvitanich
- Adrián Czornomaz

=== D–F ===
- Alexis Danelón
- Franco Del Giglio
- Leonardo Delfino
- Nicolás Demartini
- Juan Depetris
- Jorge Detona
- Faustino Dettler
- Gustavo Dezotti
- Néstor Di Luca
- Ángel Di María
- Alfredo Di Stéfano
- Bruno Díaz
- Alejandro Agustín Domenez
- Alejandro Donatti
- Rubén Dundo
- Aldo Duscher
- Paulo Dybala
- Ezequiel Echeverría
- Facundo Echevarría
- Diego Erroz
- Luis Alberto Escobedo
- Raúl Espíndola
- Néstor Espínola
- Rodrigo Esmail
- Julio César Falcioni
- Federico Fattori
- Gonzalo Favre
- Tomás Federico
- Darío Felman
- Ivan Fergonzi
- Gianluca Ferrari
- Osvaldo Ferreño
- Jonathan Figueira
- Franco Figueroa
- Esteban Figún
- Rodolfo Fischer
- Walter Fonseca
- Victoriano Frágola
- Andrés Franzoia
- Alejandro Frezzotti
- Julio Furch

=== G–I ===
- Adrián Gabbarini
- Adolfo Gaich
- Marcelo Galeazzi
- Luciano Galletti
- Pedro Alfredo Gallina
- Giuliano Galoppo
- Gabriel Gandarillas
- José Eulogio Gárate
- Juan Ezequiel García
- Roberto Gargini
- Juan Gargiulo
- Juan Garibaldi
- Héctor Gustavo Gatti
- Hugo Gatti
- Federico Gattoni
- Ezequiel Gaviglio
- Alejo Gelatini
- Gastón Gerzel
- Lautaro Gianetti
- Fernando Giarrizo
- Emmanuel Gigliotti
- Federico Girotti
- Eliseo Giusfredi
- Claus Gold Betig
- Paolo Goltz
- Alcides González
- Aníbal Roy González
- Carlos Alcides González
- Claudio Daniel González
- Nicolás Gorobsov
- Franco Gorzelewski
- Pablo Gozzarelli
- Javier Grandoli
- Damián Grosso
- Manuel Guanini
- Matías Guardia
- Jonathan Guerazar
- Brian Guerra
- Luciano Guiñazú
- Ezequiel Ham
- Agustín Hausch
- Juan Enrique Hayes
- Hernán Hechalar
- Gabriel Heinze
- Horacio Elizondo, referee
- Emanuel Hermida
- Diego Herner
- René Houseman
- Eduardo Iachetti
- Mauro Icardi
- Jonathan Ivanoff

=== J–L ===
- Lucas Janson
- Luis Kadijevic
- Enzo Kalinski
- Walter Kannemann
- Mario Kempes
- Daniel Killer
- Diego Klimowicz
- Uriel Ramírez Kloster
- Gonzalo Klusener
- Juan Komar
- Maximiliano Luayza Koot
- Matías Kranevitter
- Juan Pablo Krilanovich
- Facundo Kruspzky
- Lucas Kruspzky
- Leandro Lacunza
- Luis Lagrutta
- Erik Lamela
- Ricardo Lazbal
- Franco Lefiñir
- Darío Leguiza
- Christian Leichner
- Matías Leichner
- Federico León
- Mateo Levato
- Lucas Licht
- Vicente Locaso
- Nicolás López Macri
- Augusto Lotti
- Cristian Lucchetti
- Martín Lucero
- Abel Luciatti
- Leonardo Luppino
- Germán Lux

=== M ===
- Alexis Mac Allister
- Carlos Mac Allister
- Imanol Machuca
- Ariel Macia
- Carlos Madeo
- Nicolás Magno
- Julián Malatini
- Edgardo Maldonado
- José Luis Mamone
- Alejandro Mancuso
- Ariel Mangiantini
- César Mansanelli
- Diego Maradona
- Claudio Marangoni
- Hector Leonardo Marinaro
- Gonzalo Marinelli
- Favio Márquez
- Gerardo Martino
- Gastón Martiré
- Juan Marvezzi
- Silvio Marzolini
- Javier Mascherano
- Carlos Matheu
- Juan Manuel Mazzocchi
- Maximiliano Medina
- Andrés Mehring
- Claudio Mele
- Matías Melluso
- Waldemar Méndez
- Lucas Menossi
- César Luis Menotti, coach
- Lionel Messi
- Martín Minadevino
- Gastón Minutillo
- Braian Miranda
- Federico Mociulsky
- Lucas Modesto
- Antonio Mohamed
- Diego Mondino
- Fernando Monetti
- Lautaro Montoya
- Nehuen Montoya
- Dimas Morales
- Matías Morales
- Nicolás Morgantini
- Claudio Morresi
- Leonel Mosevich
- Agustín Mulet
- Juan Carlos Muñoz
- Julio Musimessi
- Juan Musso

=== N–P ===
- Santiago Nagüel
- Diego Nakache
- Juan Manuel Navarrete
- José Miguel Noguera
- Francisco Nouet
- Thiago Nuss
- Agustín Occhiato
- Rodolfo Orlandini
- Luca Orozco
- Patricio Ostachuk
- Valentín Otondo
- Gastón Otreras
- Alejandro Pajurek
- Martín Palermo
- Leandro Paredes
- Mariano Pasini
- Fernando Paternoster
- Diego Pave
- Miguel Ángel Pecoraro
- Emiliano Pedreira
- Alfredo Peel
- José Pékerman, coach
- Mauricio Pellegrino
- Leonel Peralta
- Ariel Gustavo Pereyra
- Natalio Perinetti
- Diego Perotti
- Ignacio Piatti
- Pablo Piatti
- Santiago Pierotti
- Maximiliano Pighin
- Axel Pinto
- Hector Pizorno
- Mauricio Pochettino
- Tomás Pochettino
- Luciano Pocrnjic
- René Pontoni
- Facundo Ponzio
- Sebastián Prediger
- Matías Presentado
- Vicente Principiano
- Ijiel Protti
- Héctor Pueblas

=== Q–R ===
- Ives Fabián Quintana
- Marcos Daniel Quiroga
- Marcos Esteban Quiroga
- Sergio Quiroga
- Federico Rasmussen
- Franco Razzotti
- Germán Real
- Federico Recalde
- Tobías Reinhart
- Ariel Reyes
- Emiliano Rigoni
- Nicolás Rinaldi
- Juan Román Riquelme
- Enzo Ritacco
- Claudio Rivadero
- Ricardo Rodríguez Marengo
- Maximiliano Rogoski
- Benjamín Rollheiser
- Esteban Rolón
- Santiago Rosa
- Martín Rose
- Agustín Rossi
- Néstor Rossi
- Oscar Rossi
- Matías Rotondi

=== S ===
- Mario Saccone
- Emiliano Sala
- Hernán Salazar
- Rodrigo Salomón
- Walter Samuel
- José Sand
- Nicolás Sansotre
- Marcos Luciano Sartor Camiña
- Javier Saviola
- Lionel Scaloni
- Darío Scatolaro
- Mauro Scatularo
- Rodrigo Schlegel
- Ignacio Schor
- Augusto Schott
- Gabriel Schürrer
- Lucas Seimandi
- Javier Sequeyra
- Darío Siviski
- Javier Sodero
- Leandro Soria
- Juan Pablo Sorín
- Raúl Speroni
- Renzo Spinaci
- Claudio Spinelli
- Ivar Stafuza
- Emiliano Strappini
- Guillermo Szeszurak

=== T–V ===
- Cristián Taborda
- Guillermo Tambussi
- Alberto Tarantini
- Nicolás Tauber
- Enzo Tejada
- Roberto Telch
- Carlos Tevez
- Nicolás Thaller
- Marcelo Tinari
- Pablo Torresagasti
- Christian Trapasso
- Jorge Trezeguet
- Jonathan Tridente
- Marcelo Trobbiani
- Franco Troyansky
- Gonzalo Ucha
- Matías Vaccaneo
- Franco Vaccaro
- Nicolás Valansi
- Diego Valeri
- José Van Tuyne
- Leonel Vangioni
- José Varacka
- Bernardo Vargas
- Mattias Vegnaduzzo
- Cristian Vella
- Santiago Vergini
- Juan Sebastián Verón
- Lucas Vesco
- Marcelo Vidal
- Hernán Villalba
- Miguel Ángel Villamonte
- Guido Villar
- José Luis Villarreal
- Ezequiel Viola

=== W–Z ===
- Nicolás Watson
- Marcelo Weigandt
- Luis Weihmuller
- Aarón Wergifker
- Axel Werner
- Lucas Daniel Wilchez
- Daniel Willington
- Enrique Wolff
- Claudio Yacob
- Damián Yáñez
- Emanuel Zagert
- Facundo Zamarián
- Javier Zanetti
- Mario Zaninovic
- Carlos Zaragoza
- Cristian Zarco
- Leonardo Zarosa
- Lucas Zelarayán
- Ricardo Zielinski
- Franco Zuculini

== Golf ==
- Ángel Cabrera
- José Cóceres
- Roberto De Vicenzo
- Estanislao Goya
- Andrés Romero
- Eduardo Romero
- Emiliano Grillo
- Alejandro Tosti

== Marine sports ==
- Serena Amato, sailing
- Tranquilo Cappozzo, rowing
- Cecilia Carranza Saroli, sailing
- Vito Dumas, yachting
- Carlos Espínola, sailing
- Germán Frers, yachting
- Eduardo Guerrero, rowing
- Emilio Homps, sailing
- Santiago Lange, sailing

== Martial arts ==
- Guido Cannetti, mixed martial arts
- Sebastián Crismanich, taekwondo
- Daniela Krukower, world champion judo
- Paula Pareto, judo
- Rubén Peucelle, wrestling and bodybuilding
- Santiago Ponzinibbio, mixed martial arts
- Laureano Staropoli, mixed martial arts

== Motorsports ==
- Martín de Álzaga, race car driver
- Lucas Benamo, race car driver
- Pablo Birger, racing driver
- Franco Colapinto, racing driver
- Juan Manuel Fangio, race car driver
- Norberto Fontana, race car driver
- Delfina Frers, racing driver
- Oscar Gálvez, race car driver
- Nestor García-Veiga, race car driver
- José Froilán González, race car driver
- Esteban Guerrieri, race car driver
- Jorge Kissling, motorcycle racer
- Oscar Larrauri, race car driver
- Eric Lichtenstein, race car driver
- Bernardo Llaver, race car driver
- José María López, race car driver
- Enrique Mansilla, racing driver
- Onofre Marimón, race car driver
- Gastón Mazzacane, race car driver
- Carlos Menditeguy, racing driver
- Roberto Mieres, racing driver
- Ignacio Montenegro, racing driver
- Carlos Okulovich, racing driver
- Jorge Recalde, rally driver
- Carlos Reutemann, race car driver and politician
- Adolfo Schwelm Cruz, race car driver
- Marcos Siebert, race car driver
- Orlando Terranova, rally driver
- Esteban Tuero, racing driver
- Nicolás Varrone, racing driver
- Federico Villagra, rally driver
- Mariano Werner, race car driver
- Ricardo Zunino, race car driver

== Polo ==
- Mariano Aguerre
- Adolfo Cambiaso
- Bartolomé Castagnola
- Andrés Gazzotti
- Lucas Monteverde
- Facundo Pieres

== Rugby ==
- Felipe Contepomi, rugby union player
- Ignacio Corleto, rugby player
- Agustín Creevy, rugby union player
- Juan Martín Fernández Lobbe, rugby union player
- Juan Martín Hernández, rugby union player
- Juan Imhoff, rugby union player
- Mario Ledesma, rugby player
- José María Núñez Piossek, rugby player
- Luciano Orquera, rugby player
- Ramiro Pez, rugbier
- Agustín Pichot, rugby union player
- Hugo Porta, rugby union player
- Rodrigo Roncero, rugby union player
- Nicolás Sánchez, rugby union player
- Joaquín Tuculet, rugby union player

== Swimming ==
- Georgina Bardach
- Damián Blaum
- Jeannette Campbell
- Federico Grabich
- José Meolans
- Alberto Zorrilla

== Tennis ==
- José Acasuso
- Juan Pablo Brzezicki
- Agustín Calleri
- Guillermo Cañas
- José Luis Clerc
- Guillermo Coria
- Brian Dabul
- Juan Martín del Potro
- Gisela Dulko
- Jonathan Erlich
- Gastón Etlis
- Clarisa Fernández
- Gastón Gaudio
- Inés Gorrochategui
- Diego Hartfield
- Mariano Hood
- Martín Jaite
- Leonardo Mayer
- Juan Mónaco
- David Nalbandián
- Mercedes María Paz
- Mariano Puerta
- Sergio Roitman
- Gabriela Sabatini
- María Emilia Salerni
- Diego Schwartzman
- Paola Suárez
- Patricia Tarabini
- Guillermo Vilas

== Volleyball ==
- Daniel Castellani
- Facundo Conte
- Hugo Conte
- Juan Cuminetti
- Luciano De Cecco
- Sabrina Soledad Germanier
- Waldo Kantor
- Esteban Martínez
- Marcos Milinkovic
- Raúl Quiroga
- Sebastián Solé
- Alejandro Spajic
- Jon Uriarte
- Julio Velasco, coach
- Javier Weber

== Miscellaneous ==
- Julio Alfredo Chiappero, chess
- Sebastien Dechamps, handball
- Carlos Enrique Díaz Sáenz Valiente, shooter
- Donald Forrester, cricket
- Martín Gramática, American football player
- Lucas Legnani, bowler
- Denis Margalik, figure skater
- Carlos Moratorio, equestrian
- Oscar Panno, chess grandmaster
- Humberto Selvetti, weightlifting
- Diego Simonet, handball
- Pablo Tabachnik, table tennis
- Martin Vari, kitesurfing

== See also ==
- List of Argentines
- List of flag bearers for Argentina at the Olympics
