= Marcos Quiroga =

Marcos Quiroga may refer to:

- Marcos Quiroga (footballer, born 1988), Argentine football forward
- Marcos Quiroga (footballer, born 1990), Argentine football midfielder
