= Nicolas Lopez =

Nicolas Lopez may refer to:

- Nicolás Lindley López (1908–1995), Peruvian military commander
- Nicolas Lopez (fencer) (born 1980), French sabre fencer
- Nicolás López (director) (born 1983), Chilean film director
- Nicolás López (footballer, born 1986), Uruguayan footballer
- Nicolás López Macri (born 1990), Argentine footballer
- Nicolás López (footballer, born 1993), Uruguayan footballer

== See also ==
- Nicola López (born 1975), American artist
