= Sartor (surname) =

Sartor is a surname. Notable people with the surname include:

- David P. Sartor, American composer and conductor
- Diane Sartor (born 1970), German skeleton racer
- Duran Sartor de Paernas (fl. c. 1210–50), Provençal troubadour
- Frank Sartor (born 1951), Australian politician
- Gustavo Collini-Sartor, Argentinian dancer
- Jean Oliver Sartor (1918–2007), American artist
- Luigi Sartor (born 1975), Italian footballer
- Marcos Luciano Sartor Camiña (born 1995), Argentinian footballer
- Marco Sartor (born 1979), Uruguayan guitarist
- Oliver Sartor, American oncologist
- Ottorino Sartor (1945–2021), Peruvian footballer
