= Juan Depetris =

Argentine professional footballer (born 1998)

Personal information
- Date of birth: 26 March 1998 (age 28)
- Place of birth: Ramos Mejía, Argentina
- Height: 1.70 m (5 ft 7 in)
- Position: Midfielder

Team information
- Current team: Juventud Unida
- Number: 21

Youth career
- Argentinos Juniors
- 2016–2017: Nueva Chicago

Senior career*
Years	Team	Apps	(Gls)
2017–2018	Nueva Chicago	1	
2019	Defensores de Salto		
2019–2020	CF Roma de Tigre	20	(1)
2021-2022	Juventud Unida (San Miguel)		
2022	Metropolitan Football Academy		
2022-2023	ASD Cotronei 1994		
2023-	Polisportiva Caraffa		
- * Club domestic league appearances and goals

Juan Depetris (born 26 March 1998) is an Argentine professional footballer who plays as a midfielder.

== Career ==
Depetris began his senior career with Nueva Chicago, who signed him from Argentinos Juniors in 2016. Depetris was promoted into their senior squad in July 2017, the final month of 2016–17, to be an unused substitute for fixtures with Argentinos Juniors, his ex-club, and Instituto, prior to being selected for his professional bow on 28 July 2017 versus San Martín; being subbed on for Norberto Palmieri. Depetris departed at the end of 2018, subsequently having stints with regional sides Defensores de Salto and Centro de Formación Roma de Tigre.

== Career statistics ==
As of 21 September 2020.

Appearances and goals by club, season and competition
Club	Season	League			Cup		Continental		Other		Total	
Club	Season	Division	Apps	Goals	Apps	Goals	Apps	Goals	Apps	Goals	Apps	Goals
Nueva Chicago	2016–17	Primera B Nacional	1	0	0	0	—		0	0	1	0
Nueva Chicago	2017–18	Primera B Nacional	0	0	0	0	—		0	0	0	0
Nueva Chicago	2018–19	Primera B Nacional	0	0	0	0	—		0	0	0	0
Career total			1	0	0	0	—		0	0	1	0
