= Mariano Celasco =

Argentine footballer

Personal information
- Full name: Mariano Gabriel Celasco Rossi
- Date of birth: 2 October 1986 (age 40)
- Place of birth: La Plata, Argentina
- Height: 1.68 m (5 ft 6 in)
- Position: Midfielder

Youth career
- Estudiantes
- Defensa y Justicia

Senior career*
Years	Team	Apps	(Gls)
2005–2007	Defensa y Justicia	47	(2)
2008–2011	Rangers	75	(4)
2011	Tiro Federal	6	(0)
2011–2012	Villa San Carlos	18	(1)
2012–2015	Lota Schwager	65	(1)
2015–2016	Rangers	23	(0)
- * Club domestic league appearances and goals

Mariano Gabriel Celasco Rossi (born 2 October 1986) is an Argentine former footballer who played as a midfielder. He is remembered for his spell at Rangers de Talca.

== Teams ==
- (Argentina) Defensa y Justicia 2005–2007
- (Chile) Rangers 2008–2010
- (Argentina) Tiro Federal 2011
- (Argentina) Villa San Carlos 2011–2012
- (Chile) Lota Schwager 2012–2015
- (Chile) Rangers 2015–2016

== Personal life ==
Celasco made his home in Talca, Chile, and naturalized Chilean by residence in 2016.

Celasco is a candidate to councillor for Talca commune in the 2024 Chilean municipal elections supported by Independent Democratic Union.
