= Andrés Bullentini =

Argentine footballer

Personal information
- Date of birth: February 6, 1969 (age 57)
- Place of birth: Rosario, Argentina
- Position: Forward

Senior career*
Years	Team	Apps	(Gls)
1992-1993	Renato Cesarini	0	(0)
1993-1996	Gimnasia y Esgrima de Jujuy	58	(2)
1996-1999	Provincial Osorno		
2000-2005	Argentino de Rosario	7	(0)
- * Club domestic league appearances and goals

Andrés Bullentini (born February 6, 1969) is a former Argentine footballer who played as a forward for clubs of Argentina and Chile.

== Teams ==
- Renato Cesarini 1992–1993
- Gimnasia y Esgrima de Jujuy 1993–1996
- Provincial Osorno 1996–1999
- Argentino de Rosario 2000–2005
