= Carlos Cinalli =

Argentine footballer

Personal information
- Full name: Carlos Nicolás Cinalli
- Date of birth: 14 February 1981 (age 45)
- Place of birth: La Plata, Argentina
- Height: 1.74 m (5 ft 9 in)
- Position: Defender

Youth career
- Gimnasia y Esgrima La Plata

Senior career*
Years	Team	Apps	(Gls)
1999-2000	Gimnasia y Esgrima La Plata	2	(0)
2000	S.C. Braga		
2001	Unión Española		
2001-2002	Uniao Leiria		
2002-2003	Defensores de Cambaceres		
2003-2005	Villa San Carlos		
- * Club domestic league appearances and goals

Carlos Nicolás Cinalli (born 14 February 1981) is an Argentine former professional footballer who played as a defender for clubs in Argentina, Chile and Portugal.

== Career ==
Born in La Plata, Argentina, Cinalli began playing football for the youth teams of Gimnasia y Esgrima de La Plata. He made his debut with Gimnasia's senior team in a Primera División Argentina match against Newell's Old Boys on 21 November 1999. He made only one more league appearance for Gimnasia.

== Clubs ==
- (Argentina) Gimnasia y Esgrima de La Plata 1999–2000
- (Portugal) Sporting Braga 2000
- (Chile) Unión Española 2001
- (Portugal) Uniao Leiria 2001–2002
- (Argentina) Defensores de Cambaceres 2002–2003
- (Argentina) Villa San Carlos 2003–2005
