= Aníbal Roy González =

Argentine footballer

Aníbal Roy González (born 7 February 1978) is an Argentine former professional footballer who played as a midfielder.

== Career ==
- Vélez Sársfield 1998–2000
- O'Higgins 2001
- Olimpo 2002–2003
- San Martín de Mendoza 2003
- Sport Boys 2004
- Manta 2005
- Atlético Tucumán 2005–2007
- La Florida 2007–2008
- Deportivo Aguilares 2008–2010
- Nacional Potosí 2011
