= Maximiliano Pighin =

Argentine footballer

Maximiliano Pighín
Personal information
- Date of birth: 7 July 1985 (age 41)
- Place of birth: Lujan (BA), Argentina
- Height: 1.82 m (6 ft 0 in)
- Position: Midfielder

Senior career*
Years	Team	Apps	(Gls)
2003–2006	Flandria	76	(0)
2006	Almagro	8	(0)
2007–2008	Unión San Felipe	51	(0)
2008–2009	Comunicaciones	26	(0)
2009–2015	Luján	216	(6)
2013–2014	→ Unión San Felipe (loan)	35	(2)
2015–2016	Unión San Felipe	19	(1)
2016–2017	Sportivo Las Parejas	20	(0)
2017–2024	Luján	135	(1)
- * Club domestic league appearances and goals as of 2 December 2024

Maximiliano Pighin (born 7 July 1985) is an Argentine footballer who plays as a midfielder. The most part of his career is distributed between Unión San Felipe and Luján.

== Teams ==
- (Argentina) Flandria 2003–2006
- (Argentina) Almagro 2006
- (Chile) Unión San Felipe 2007–2008
- (Argentina) Comunicaciones 2008–2009
- (Argentina) Luján 2009–2013
- (Chile) Unión San Felipe 2013–2014
- (Argentina) Luján 2014–2015
- (Chile) Unión San Felipe 2015–2016
- (Argentina) Sportivo Las Parejas 2016–2017
- (Argentina) Luján 2017–2024
