= Héctor Baillié =

Argentine footballer

Personal information
- Full name: Héctor Adrián Baillié
- Date of birth: 1 August 1968 (age 58)
- Place of birth: Lanús, Buenos Aires, Argentina
- Position: Forward

Senior career*
| Years | Team | Apps | (Gls) |
| | Unión | 20 | (3) |
| | Chaco For Ever | 7 | (2) |
| 1980–1983 | Banfield | 69 | (11) |
| 1985 | Quilmes | 38 | (5) |
| 1986 | El Porvenir | 16 | (2) |
| 1986–1988 | Douglas Haig | 67 | (24) |
| 1988–1989 | Sportivo Italiano | 39 | (11) |
| 1991–1992 | Lanús | 21 | (4) |
| 1992–1995 | Talleres (RE) | 74 | (15) |
| 1995–1996 | El Porvenir | 10 | (2) |
| Total | | 361 | (79) |
- * Club domestic league appearances and goals

Héctor Adrián Baillié (born November 26, 1960, in Lanús, Buenos Aires, Argentina) is a former Argentine footballer who played for clubs of Argentina and Chile.
