= Matías Guardia =

Argentine footballer

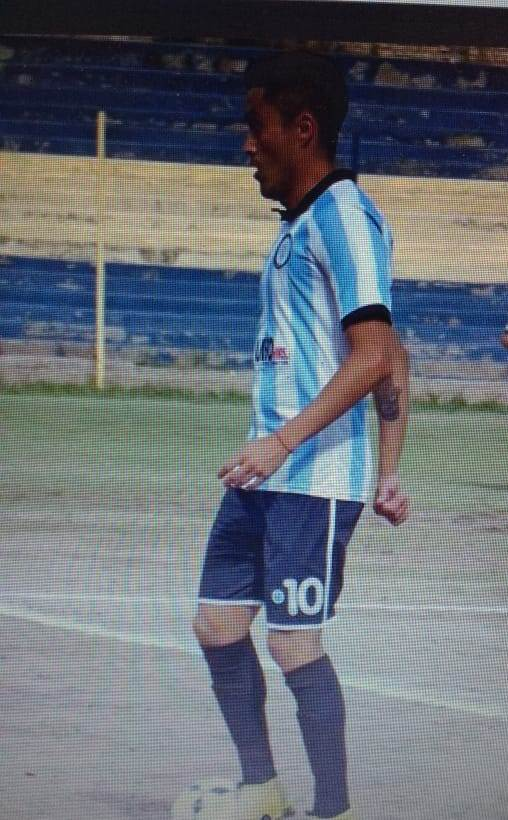
- Guardia with Argentino de Mendoza in 2018

Personal information
- Full name: Matías José Guardia Torres
- Date of birth: 5 March 1991 (age 35)
- Place of birth: Mendoza, Argentina
- Position: Midfielder

Senior career*
Years	Team	Apps	(Gls)
2010	Estudiantes RC	1	(0)
2011–2012	Independiente Rivadavia	1	(0)
2012–2013	Gutiérrez	1	(1)
2013–2014	Leonardo Murialdo	9	(0)
2014–2015	Huracán Las Heras	18	(2)
2015	Independiente Rivadavia	2	(0)
2015	Unión La Calera	9	(1)
2016	Huracán Las Heras	7	(4)
2016–2017	Iberia	17	(2)
2017	Luján SC	16	(4)
2018	Atenas RC	–	(–)
2018	Argentino de Mendoza	–	(–)
2019	Deportivo Siquinalá	24	(4)
2021	Puerto San José	–	(–)
- * Club domestic league appearances and goals

Matías José Guardia Torres (born 5 March 1991) is an Argentine former professional association footballer who played as a midfielder.

== Career ==
- (Argentina) Independiente Rivadavia 2010–2012
- (Argentina) Gutiérrez 2012–2013
- (Argentina) Leonardo Murialdo 2013–2014
- (Argentina) Huracán Las Heras 2014–2015
- (Argentina) Independiente Rivadavia 2015
- (Chile) Unión La Calera 2015
- (Argentina) Huracán Las Heras 2016
- (Chile) Iberia 2016–2017
- (Argentina) Atenas de Río Cuarto 2018
- (Argentina) Argentino de Mendoza 2018
- (Guatemala) Deportivo Siquinalá 2019
- (Guatemala) Puerto San José 2021
