= Eliseo Giusfredi =

Argentine footballer (born 1986)

Personal information
- Full name: Eliseo David Giusfredi
- Date of birth: 2 October 1986 (age 40)
- Place of birth: Argentina
- Height: 1.80 m (5 ft 11 in)
- Position: Forward

Youth career
- –2003: River Plate
- 2004–2007: Seton Hall

Senior career*
Years	Team	Apps	(Gls)
2008	Sportakademklub	9	(1)
2009	Al-Ahli (Amman)		
- * Club domestic league appearances and goals

Eliseo David Giusfredi (born 2 October 1986) is an Argentine former professional footballer who played as a forward.

== Career ==
Giusfredi is a product of River Plate youth academy.

In 2008, he played for Sportakademklub that narrowly avoided relegation from Russian First Division. Giusfredi made his professional debut on 9 August 2008 against Volga Tver and scored a goal that brought his team a draw.

He was in talks with Armenian FC Pyunik early in 2009, but the move did not materialise.

In 2009, he played in second-tier football league of Jordan for Al-Ahli (Amman).

In June 2010 due to an injury he had an unsuccessful trial with Costa Rican L.D. Alajuelense.
