= Roberto Bassaletti =

Chilean footballer

Personal information
- Full name: Roberto Sebastián Bassaletti Vega
- Date of birth: May 3, 1983 (age 43)
- Place of birth: Talcahuano, Chile
- Position: Attacking midfielder

Youth career
- Huachipato

Senior career*
Years	Team	Apps	(Gls)
2001–2004	Huachipato	26	(2)
2005	Deportes La Serena	3	(0)
2005	Deportes Puerto Montt	10	(0)
2006	Santiago Wanderers	2	(0)
- * Club domestic league appearances and goals

Roberto Sebastián Bassaletti Vega (born May 3, 1983) is a Chilean former footballer who played as an attacking midfielder.

== Teams ==
- (Chile) Huachipato (2001–2004)
- (Chile) Deportes La Serena (2005)
- (Chile) Deportes Puerto Montt (2005)
- (Chile) Santiago Wanderers (2006)
