= Mariano Pasini =

Argentinian footballer

Personal information
- Full name: Mariano Luis Pasini
- Date of birth: 19 October 1979 (age 47)
- Place of birth: Buenos Aires, Argentina
- Height: 1.76 m (5 ft 9 in)
- Position: Midfielder

Senior career*
Years	Team	Apps	(Gls)
1997	Vélez Sársfield	2	(0)
1997–1999	All Boys		
2000	Santiago Wanderers	0	(0)
2000	Lobos BUAP		
2001	Racing Montevideo	13	(0)
2001–2002	Estudiantes BA	45	(5)
2002–2003	All Boys	28	(1)
2003–2004	Atlanta	44	(7)
2004–2005	Fortuna Düsseldorf	24	(3)
2005–2006	Temperley	30	(1)
2006–2010	Tigre	52	(1)
2010–2011	Deportivo Laferrere	2	(0)

Managerial career
- 2014–2015: Sportivo Italiano (assistant)
- 2016–2017: San Martín Tucumán (assistant)
- 2020–2021: Tigre (assistant)
- 2021: Instituto (assistant)
- 2022: Barracas Central (assistant)
- * Club domestic league appearances and goals

Mariano Luis Pasini (born 19 October 1979 in Buenos Aires, Argentina) is a retired Argentine footballer who played as a midfielder.

== Teams ==
- (Argentina) Vélez Sársfield 1997
- (Argentina) All Boys 1997–1999
- (Mexico) Lobos BUAP 2000
- (Chile) Santiago Wanderers 2000
- (Uruguay) Racing Club de Montevideo 2001
- (Argentina) Estudiantes de Buenos Aires 2001–2002
- (Argentina) All Boys 2002–2003
- (Argentina) Atlanta 2003–2004
- (Germany) Fortuna Düsseldorf 2004–2005
- (Argentina) Temperley 2005–2006
- (Argentina) Tigre 2006–2010
- (Argentina) Deportivo Laferrere 2010–2011

== Personal life ==
Mariano is the son of the football manager and former player Salvador Pasini.
