= Franco Figueroa =

Argentine footballer

Personal information
- Full name: Franco Figueroa
- Date of birth: 30 December 1989 (age 36)
- Place of birth: Buenos Aires, Argentina
- Height: 1.77 m (5 ft 10 in)
- Position: Forward

Senior career*
Years	Team	Apps	(Gls)
2013	Chacarita Juniors	0	(0)
2014	Carolina RailHawks	1	(0)
- * Club domestic league appearances and goals as of 13 August 2014

Franco Figueroa (born 30 December 1989) is an Argentinian football player.

== Career ==
Figueroa signed with Carolina RailHawks in May 2014, making his professional debut on 8 June 2014, in a 1–6 loss against FC Edmonton.
