= Raúl Speroni =

Argentine footballer

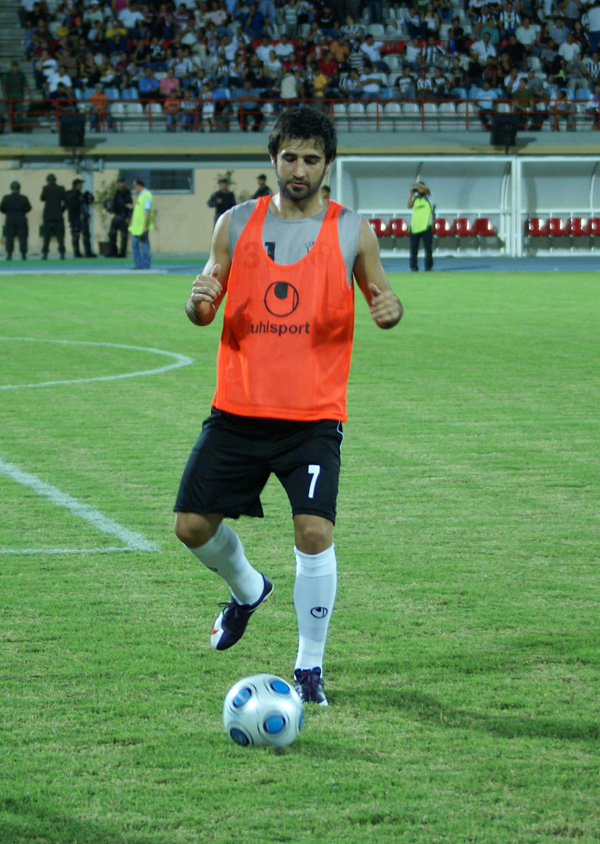
- Raúl Speroni.

Personal information
- Full name: Raúl Alberto Speroni
- Date of birth: 8 March 1986 (age 40)
- Place of birth: Buenos Aires, Argentina
- Height: 1.80 m (5 ft 11 in)
- Position: Central midfielder

Senior career*
| Years | Team | Apps | (Gls) |
| 2000–2005 | Vélez Sarsfield | | |
| 2005–2007 | Estudiantes de La Plata | | |
| 2007–2008 | Arsenal de Sarandí | | |
| 2008–2010 | Zamora | 25 | (0) |
| 2010–2011 | Carabobo | 1 | (0) |
| 2011–2013 | Flacăra Făget | | |
| 2013–2014 | Minerul Motru | 21 | (2) |
| 2014 | Bihor Oradea | 6 | (0) |
- * Club domestic league appearances and goals as of 13 July 2015

Raúl Alberto Speroni (born 8 March 1986, in Buenos Aires) is an Argentine footballer who played in the Venezuelan Primera División for Zamora and Carabobo.
