= Leonardo Delfino =

Argentine footballer

Personal information
- Full name: Leonardo Adrián Delfino
- Date of birth: October 1, 1976 (age 50)
- Place of birth: Castelar, Buenos Aires, Argentina
- Position: Midfielder

Youth career
- Boca Juniors

Senior career*
Years	Team	Apps	(Gls)
1995–1996	Boca Juniors	1	(0)
1996–1997	Grupo Universitario		
1998	Deportivo Morón		
1999–2000	Banfield		
2000–2001	San Miguel		
2001–2002	Unión La Calera		
2002	Tigre	7	(0)
2003	Sarmiento de Junín	10	(0)
- Independiente Rivadavia

International career
1993	Argentina U17		
- * Club domestic league appearances and goals

Leonardo Adrián Delfino (born October 1, 1976, in Castelar (Buenos Aires), Argentina) is an Argentine former footballer who played as a midfielder.

== Teams ==
- (Argentina) Boca Juniors 1995–1996
- (Argentina) Grupo Universitario 1996–1997
- (Argentina) Deportivo Morón 1998
- (Argentina) Banfield 1999–2000
- (Argentina) San Miguel 2000–2001
- (Chile) Unión La Calera 2001–2002
- (Argentina) Tigre 2002
- (Argentina) Sarmiento de Junín 2003
- (Argentina) Independiente Rivadavia
