= Eduardo Cremasco =

Argentine footballer

Personal information
- Full name: Eduardo Norberto Cremasco
- Date of birth: 1946
- Date of death: 11 September 1988 (aged 41–42)
- Position: Midfielder

Senior career*
Years	Team	Apps	(Gls)
1968–1969	Estudiantes de La Plata	18	(0)
1970	Club América		
- * Club domestic league appearances and goals

Eduardo Cremasco (1946 – 11 September 1988) was an Argentine footballer.
