= Luis María Carregado =

Argentine footballer (born 1950)

Personal information
- Date of birth: 19 October 1950 (age 76)
- Place of birth: Buenos Aires, Argentina
- Position: Midfielder

Senior career*
Years	Team	Apps	(Gls)
1970–1974	Boca Juniors	17	(2)
1972	→ Estudiantes de La Plata (loan)	28	(3)
1975	Unión Española		
1976	Atlante		
1977	San Martín de Tucumán	15	(2)
1978–1980	All Boys	5	(0)
1981–1983	Talleres de Remedios de Escalada	13	(1)
- * Club domestic league appearances and goals

Luis María Carregado (born 19 October 1950) is an Argentine former professional footballer who played as a midfielder for clubs in Argentina, Chile and Mexico.

== Honours ==
Boca Juniors

- Primera División Argentina: 1970

Unión Española

- Chilean Primera División: 1975
