= Patricio Bedrossian =

Argentine footballer

Personal information
- Date of birth: 12 April 1975 (age 51)
- Place of birth: Mar de Ajo, Buenos Aires, Argentina
- Position: Forward

Senior career*
Years	Team	Apps	(Gls)
1995–1996	Lanús	2	(0)
1997–1998	Almirante Brown de Arrecifes	22	(3)
1998–1999	Estudiantes	12	(1)
2000–2001	San Telmo	35	(16)
2001–2002	Defensores de Belgrano	23	(7)
2002	Independiente Petrolero	4	(0)
2003	Almirante Brown	33	(5)
2004	All Boys	7	(1)
2004	Provincial Osorno		
2005	Club Atlético Banfield	12	(2)
2005	Deportivo Santamarina	4	(0)
2006	Deportivo Mictlán		
- * Club domestic league appearances and goals

Patricio Bedrossian (born 12 April 1975) is an Argentine former professional footballer who played as a forward for clubs from Argentina, Chile, Bolivia, and Guatemala.
