= Franco Vaccaro =

Argentine footballer

Personal information
- Full name: Franco Rodrigo Vaccaro
- Date of birth: 8 June 1997 (age 29)
- Place of birth: Puerto Madryn, Argentina
- Position: Forward

Youth career
- Alumni de Puerto Madryn
- Guillermo Brown

Senior career*
| Years | Team | Apps | (Gls) |
| 2018 | Guillermo Brown | 0 | (0) |
| 2019 | Juan José Moreno | 12 | (1) |
- * Club domestic league appearances and goals

Franco Rodrigo Vaccaro (born 8 June 1997) is an Argentine professional footballer who plays as a forward.

== Career ==
Vaccaro started his career with Alumni de Puerto Madryn before joining Guillermo Brown of Primera B Nacional. He made his senior bow in the Copa Argentina in July 2018, featuring for fifty-six minutes of a 1–0 defeat to Primera División team Tigre. In 2019, Vaccaro featured in the Torneo Regional Federal Amateur for Juan José Moreno; scoring once in twelve appearances.

== Career statistics ==
As of 29 August 2020.

Club statistics
| Club | Season | League | | | Cup | | League Cup | | Continental | | Other | | Total | |
| Club | Season | Division | Apps | Goals | Apps | Goals | Apps | Goals | Apps | Goals | Apps | Goals | Apps | Goals |
|---|---|---|---|---|---|---|---|---|---|---|---|---|---|---|
| Guillermo Brown | 2018–19 | Primera B Nacional | 0 | 0 | 1 | 0 | — | | — | | 0 | 0 | 1 | 0 |
| Juan José Moreno | 2019 | Torneo Amateur | 12 | 1 | 0 | 0 | — | | — | | 0 | 0 | 12 | 1 |
| Career total | | | 12 | 1 | 1 | 0 | — | | — | | 0 | 0 | 13 | 1 |
