= Leonardo Cauteruchi =

Argentine footballer (born 1973)

Personal information
- Full name: Leonardo Pablo Cauteruchi
- Date of birth: 4 May 1973 (age 53)
- Place of birth: Mar del Plata, Argentina
- Height: 1.83 m (6 ft 0 in)
- Position: Goalkeeper

Youth career
- Boca Juniors

Senior career*
Years	Team	Apps	(Gls)
1993–1995	Platense	0	(0)
1994–1996	Atlanta	6	(0)
1996–1998	Aldosivi	16	(0)
1999–2002	Palestino	77	(0)
2003–2004	Universidad Católica	72	(0)
2005	Deportes Concepción	12	(0)
2006	Santiago Morning	0	(0)
2006–2007	Olimpo	14	(0)
- * Club domestic league appearances and goals

Leonardo Pablo Cauteruchi (born 4 May 1973) is an Argentine former professional football who played as a goalkeeper for clubs in Argentina and Chile.

== Teams ==
- (Argentina) Platense 1993–1995
- (Argentina) Atlanta 1995–1996
- (Argentina) Aldosivi 1996–1998
- (Chile) Palestino 1999–2002
- (Chile) Universidad Católica 2003–2004
- (Chile) Deportes Concepción 2005
- (Chile) Santiago Morning 2006
- (Argentina) Olimpo 2006–2007

== Post-retirement ==
Cauteruchi became a football agent of players and managers like Pablo Guede.
