= Damián Yáñez =

Argentine footballer

Personal information
- Date of birth: July 31, 1972 (age 54)
- Place of birth: Lanús, Buenos Aires, Argentina
- Position: Midfielder

Senior career*
Years	Team	Apps	(Gls)
1990–1993	Talleres RdE	68	(4)
1994–1995	All Boys		
1995–1996	Chacarita Juniors	33	(11)
1996–1997	Racing Club	3	(1)
1997	Deportes Temuco	12	(4)
1998	Cobreloa	24	(9)
1999	Rangers	16	(1)
1999–2000	Defensa y Justicia	25	(2)
2000–2002	All Boys		
2002	Deportivo Morón	16	(3)
2003	Cobresal	37	(5)
2004	Aurora	18	(1)
2005	Olmedo	6	(0)
2005–2007	Talleres RdE	38	(9)
2007–2009	Douglas Haig	44	(4)

Managerial career
- 2014–: Talleres RdE (youth)
- 2025: Talleres RdE (caretaker)
- * Club domestic league appearances and goals

Damián Gustavo Yáñez (born July 31, 1972, in Lanús in Buenos Aires, Argentina) is an Argentine former footballer who played as a midfielder for clubs in Argentina, Chile, Bolivia and Ecuador. He currently works as coach for the Talleres de Remedios de Escalada reserve team.

== Teams ==
- Talleres de Remedios de Escalada 1990–1993
- All Boys 1994–1995
- Chacarita Juniors 1995–1996
- Racing Club 1996–1997
- Deportes Temuco 1997
- Cobreloa 1998
- Rangers de Talca 1999
- Defensa y Justicia 1999–2000
- All Boys 2000–2002
- Deportivo Morón 2002
- Cobresal 2003
- Aurora 2004
- Olmedo 2005
- Talleres de Remedios de Escalada 2005–2007
- Douglas Haig 2007–2009
