= Alfredo Peel =

English-born Argentine footballer

Personal information
- Full name: Alfredo Luis Peel Yates
- Place of birth: England

International career
Years	Team	Apps	(Gls)
1911	Argentina	4	(0)

Alfredo Luis Peel Yates was an English-born, Argentine international footballer who made four appearances for the Argentina national team in 1911.
