= Ivan Fergonzi =

Argentine footballer (born 1983)

Roberto Ivan Fergonzi (born March 11, 1983, in Buenos Aires, Argentina) is an Argentine professional footballer. Fergonzi began playing football in the youth academy of local side River Plate. He played for professional clubs in Argentina, Ecuador, Indonesia, Singapore, Uruguay and Bolivia

== Teams ==
2002-2003: Defensores de Belgrano

2004: Juventud Alianza

2004: Club Atletico Villa Atuel

2005: Club Atletico Acassuso

2006: Persiba Balikpapan

2007: Durazno FC

2008: Manta FC

2008: Deportivo Azogues

2009: Imbabura S.C.

2010: Club Real Potosí

2011: Geylang International FC

2013- Sport Club Corinthians USA
