= Rodrigo Esmail =

Argentine professional footballer

Personal information
- Date of birth: 8 August 1995 (age 31)
- Place of birth: Buenos Aires, Argentina
- Height: 1.86 m (6 ft 1 in)
- Position: Defender

Senior career*
Years	Team	Apps	(Gls)
2015–2019	Atlanta	4	(0)
2016	→ Cerro Largo (loan)	9	(1)
2017–2018	→ Cañuelas (loan)	13	(1)
- * Club domestic league appearances and goals as of 08:51, 27 April 2019 (UTC)

Rodrigo Esmail (born 8 August 1995) is an Argentine professional footballer who plays as a defender.

== Club career ==
Esmail's career began with Atlanta. He made his first-team debut after featuring for the full duration of a Primera B Metropolitana draw away to Almagro on 13 November 2015, with three more appearances coming in the 2016 campaign as they finished second; two points off promotion. In August 2016, Esmail was loaned to Uruguayan Segunda División side Cerro Largo. He appeared nine times for the club, including on 26 November when he scored his first senior goal in a three-goal victory against Deportivo Maldonado. Having returned to Atlanta, Esmail left on loan again on 30 June 2017 to Primera C Metropolitana's Cañuelas.

Esmail left Atlanta in the summer 2019.

== International career ==
Esmail received a call-up from Julio Olarticoechea to represent the Argentina U23s at the 2016 Sait Nagjee Trophy in Kozhikode, India.

== Career statistics ==
As of 27 April 2019.

Appearances and goals by club, season and competition
Club	Season	League			Cup		League Cup		Continental		Other		Total	
Club	Season	Division	Apps	Goals	Apps	Goals	Apps	Goals	Apps	Goals	Apps	Goals	Apps	Goals
Atlanta	2015	Primera B Metropolitana	1	0	0	0	—		—		0	0	1	0
Atlanta	2016	Primera B Metropolitana	3	0	0	0	—		—		0	0	3	0
Atlanta	2016–17	Primera B Metropolitana	0	0	0	0	—		—		0	0	0	0
Atlanta	2017–18	Primera B Metropolitana	0	0	0	0	—		—		0	0	0	0
Atlanta	2018–19	Primera B Metropolitana	0	0	1	0	—		—		0	0	1	0
Atlanta	Total		4	0	1	0	—		—		0	0	5	0
Cerro Largo (loan)	2016	Segunda División	9	1	0	0	—		—		0	0	9	1
Cañuelas (loan)	2017–18	Primera C Metropolitana	13	1	0	0	—		—		0	0	13	1
Career total			26	2	1	0	—		—		0	0	27	2
