= Nicolás Amerise =

Argentine footballer

Personal information
- Date of birth: July 10, 1990 (age 36)
- Place of birth: Santa Fe, Argentina
- Height: 1.93 m (6 ft 4 in)
- Position: Forward

Senior career*
Years	Team	Apps	(Gls)
2009–2012	Unión de Santa Fe	6	(1)
2012	Melgar	4	(0)
2012–2013	Central Córdoba (R)	7	(0)
2013	Tiro Federal	6	(0)
2013–2014	Sanluqueño	1	(0)
Medal record
Winner	Liga Santafesina de Fútbol	2010
- * Club domestic league appearances and goals

Nicolás Amerise (born July 10, 1990) is an Argentine former footballer.
