= Lucas Modesto =

Argentine professional footballer

Personal information
- Full name: Lucas Gabriel Modesto
- Date of birth: 9 November 1996 (age 30)
- Place of birth: Argentina
- Height: 1.79 m (5 ft 10 in)
- Position: Midfielder

Youth career
- Tigre

Senior career*
Years	Team	Apps	(Gls)
2018–2019	Atlanta	5	(1)
2019	Deportivo Armenio	5	(0)
- * Club domestic league appearances and goals as of 14:33, 16 October 2019 (UTC)

Lucas Gabriel Modesto (born 9 November 1996) is an Argentine professional footballer who plays as a midfielder.

== Career ==
Modesto, after signing from Tigre, started his senior career with Atlanta. He made his professional debut in a 3–1 home victory over Justo José de Urquiza on 17 November, which was followed by the midfielder scoring his first goal in his second appearance against All Boys four days later at the Estadio Islas Malvinas.

== Career statistics ==
As of 28 April 2019.

Appearances and goals by club, season and competition
Club	Season	League			Cup		League Cup		Continental		Other		Total	
Club	Season	Division	Apps	Goals	Apps	Goals	Apps	Goals	Apps	Goals	Apps	Goals	Apps	Goals
Atlanta	2018–19	Primera B Metropolitana	5	1	0	0	—		—		0	0	5	1
Career total			5	1	0	0	—		—		0	0	5	1
