= Julio Alfredo Chiappero =

Argentine chess player (born 2006)

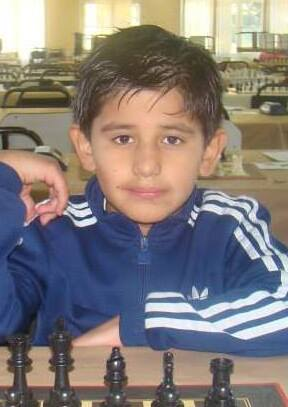
- Alfredo in 2014

Personal information
- Born: San Salvador de Jujuy, Jujuy, Argentina

Chess career
- Country: Argentina
- Title: FIDE Master (2025)
- Peak rating: 2283 (July 2024)

Julio Alfredo Chiappero is an Argentinian chess player. He was the Argentine Champion in the U-8 category before reaching the maximum age in 2014.

Julio Alfredo Chiappero has climbed up the podium of Argentine chess for three consecutive years, winning national third place in Carlos Paz, Córdoba at just five years old in 2012, the following year achieving the Argentine Sub-Championship title in Embalse at six, and finally managing to become Argentine Champion in 2014, undefeated with 7 wins and two tables, winning the gold medal among national powers such as Buenos Aires, Córdoba, San Luis, Santa Fe, etc.

In 2013, Julio Alfredo attended international commitments due to his position as a valuable extra player. He was present at the Pan American Youth Festival held in Poços de Caldas, Brazil where he ranked 16th in the classic tournament and 8th in blitz. Months later he attended the South American Youth Festival held in the city of Cochabamba, Bolivia and achieved 12th in classic and 3rd in blitz mode.

2014 was an important year for the young player where he obtained various results with great importance, including his U-8 title in Córdoba. He also attended the Pan American Youth Festival in Oaxtepec, Mexico and finished in the classic tournament at 18th and in blitz at 9th. Afterwards he participated in the South American Youth Festival, held in Montevideo, and continued his run gaining 6th in classic and 4th in blitz. He finished his year off by participating in the IRT Sub 1800 Carlos Guimard Memorial Competition, competing with players of all ages.

He has been given an Elo ranking of first.
