= Luciano Cardenali =

Argentine footballer (born 1986)

Personal information
- Date of birth: 30 June 1986 (age 40)
- Place of birth: Buenos Aires, Argentina
- Height: 1.80 m (5 ft 11 in)
- Position: Forward

Senior career*
Years	Team	Apps	(Gls)
2009-2011	Fénix	64	(10)
2012-2014	León de Huánuco	22	(3)
2015	Independiente	24	(3)
2016	Sportivo Las Parejas	10	(0)
2016	Estudiantes	16	(2)
2017	Unión F.C.	8	(2)
2019	Juventud Unida	8	(3)
2021	9 de Julio	5	(0)
Total		157	(23)
- * Club domestic league appearances and goals

Luciano Cardenali (born 30 June 1986) is an Argentine former professional footballer who played as a forward.
