= Norberto Palmieri =

Argentine footballer

Personal information
- Full name: Norberto Darío Palmieri
- Date of birth: 23 March 1996 (age 30)
- Place of birth: Buenos Aires, Argentina
- Height: 1.78 m (5 ft 10 in)
- Position: Defensive midfielder

Team information
- Current team: Unión San Felipe
- Number: 8

Youth career
- Nueva Chicago

Senior career*
| Years | Team | Apps | (Gls) |
| 2014–2018 | Nueva Chicago | 40 | (0) |
| 2019–2020 | Oriente Petrolero | 52 | (4) |
| 2021 | Deportivo Morón | 33 | (0) |
| 2022–2025 | Talleres RdE | 106 | (3) |
| 2026– | Unión San Felipe | 1 | (0) |
- * Club domestic league appearances and goals as of 23 February 2026

Norberto Darío Palmieri (born 23 March 1996) is an Argentine professional footballer who plays as a defensive midfielder for Unión San Felipe.

== Career ==
Born in Buenos Aires, Argentina, Palmieri started his career with Nueva Chicago and left them at the end of 2018.

In 2019, Palmieri moved to Bolivia and signed with Oriente Petrolero. With them, he took part in both the 2019 and the 2020 Copa Sudamericana.

Back to Argentina, Palmieri joined Deportivo Morón on 11 February 2021. The next year, he switched to Talleres de Remedios de Escalada and won the 2023 Primera B Metropolitana. He ended his contract in November 2025.

In December 2025, Palmieri moved to Chile and joined Unión San Felipe.
