= Gastón Martiré =

Argentine footballer

Personal information
- Full name: Gastón Luis Martiré
- Date of birth: 7 March 1999 (age 27)
- Place of birth: Roldán, Argentina
- Height: 1.65 m (5 ft 5 in)
- Position: Forward

Team information
- Current team: Fundación Amigos (on loan from Villa Dálmine)

Youth career
- Unión
- Renato Cesarini
- 2016–2018: Villa Dálmine

Senior career*
Years	Team	Apps	(Gls)
2018–	Villa Dálmine	1	(0)
2020–	→ Fundación Amigos (loan)		
- * Club domestic league appearances and goals

Gastón Luis Martiré (born 7 March 1999) is an Argentine professional footballer who plays as a forward for Fundación Amigos, on loan from Villa Dálmine.

== Career ==
Martiré, via youth stints with Unión and Renato Cesarini, began his senior career with Villa Dálmine; having signed in 2016. He made the breakthrough into first-team football in the 2018–19 Primera B Nacional season, with manager Felipe De la Riva selecting him as a substitute for a Copa Argentina round of sixty-four tie with UAI Urquiza on 17 July 2018. His professional debut arrived in the following round of the competition, as he came off the bench in Villa Dálmine's defeat to River Plate on 28 July. He made his Primera B Nacional bow in April 2019 against Defensores de Belgrano.

In January 2020, Martiré was loaned to Fundación Amigos of Torneo Regional Federal Amateur.

== Career statistics ==
As of 30 August 2020.

Appearances and goals by club, season and competition
Club	Season	League			Cup		Continental		Other		Total	
Club	Season	Division	Apps	Goals	Apps	Goals	Apps	Goals	Apps	Goals	Apps	Goals
Villa Dálmine	2018–19	Primera B Nacional	0	0	1	0	—		0	0	1	0
Villa Dálmine	2019–20	Primera B Nacional	1	0	0	0	—		0	0	1	0
Career total			1	0	1	0	—		0	0	2	0
