= Carlos Zaragoza =

Argentine footballer (1973–2020)

Personal information
- Full name: Carlos Marcelino Zaragoza Medina
- Date of birth: 6 January 1973
- Place of birth: Buenos Aires, Argentina
- Date of death: 5 December 2020 (aged 47)
- Place of death: Vicente López, Buenos Aires, Argentina
- Position: Centre-back

Youth career
- Argentinos Juniors
- San Miguel

Senior career*
| Years | Team | Apps | (Gls) |
| 1990–1994 | San Miguel | | |
| 1994–1995 | Santiago Wanderers | 25 | (2) |
| 1996 | San Miguel | | |
| 1996–1997 | Deportivo Español | 9 | (0) |
| 1997–1999 | San Miguel | | |
| 1999–2000 | Banfield | 32 | (0) |
| 2000–2002 | San Miguel | | |
| 2002–2004 | Tigre | 64 | (4) |
| 2004–2005 | Juventud Unida Universitario | 22 | (3) |
| 2005–2007 | Comunicaciones | 34 | (1) |
- * Club domestic league appearances and goals

Carlos Marcelino Zaragoza Medina (6 January 1973 – 5 December 2020) was an Argentine footballer who played for clubs of Argentina and Chile.

== Teams ==
Besides Argentina, Zaragoza played for Santiago Wanderers in the Chilean Segunda División.

- (Argentina) San Miguel 1990–1994
- (Chile) Santiago Wanderers 1994–1995
- (Argentina) San Miguel 1996
- (Argentina) Deportivo Español 1996–1997
- (Argentina) San Miguel 1997–1999
- (Argentina) Banfield 1999–2000
- (Argentina) San Miguel 2000–2002
- (Argentina) Tigre 2002–2004
- (Argentina) Juventud Unida Universitario 2004–2005
- (Argentina) Comunicaciones 2005–2007

== Teams ==
- (Chile) Santiago Wanderers 1995 (Chilean Primera B Championship)
