= Ricardo Lazbal =

Argentine footballer

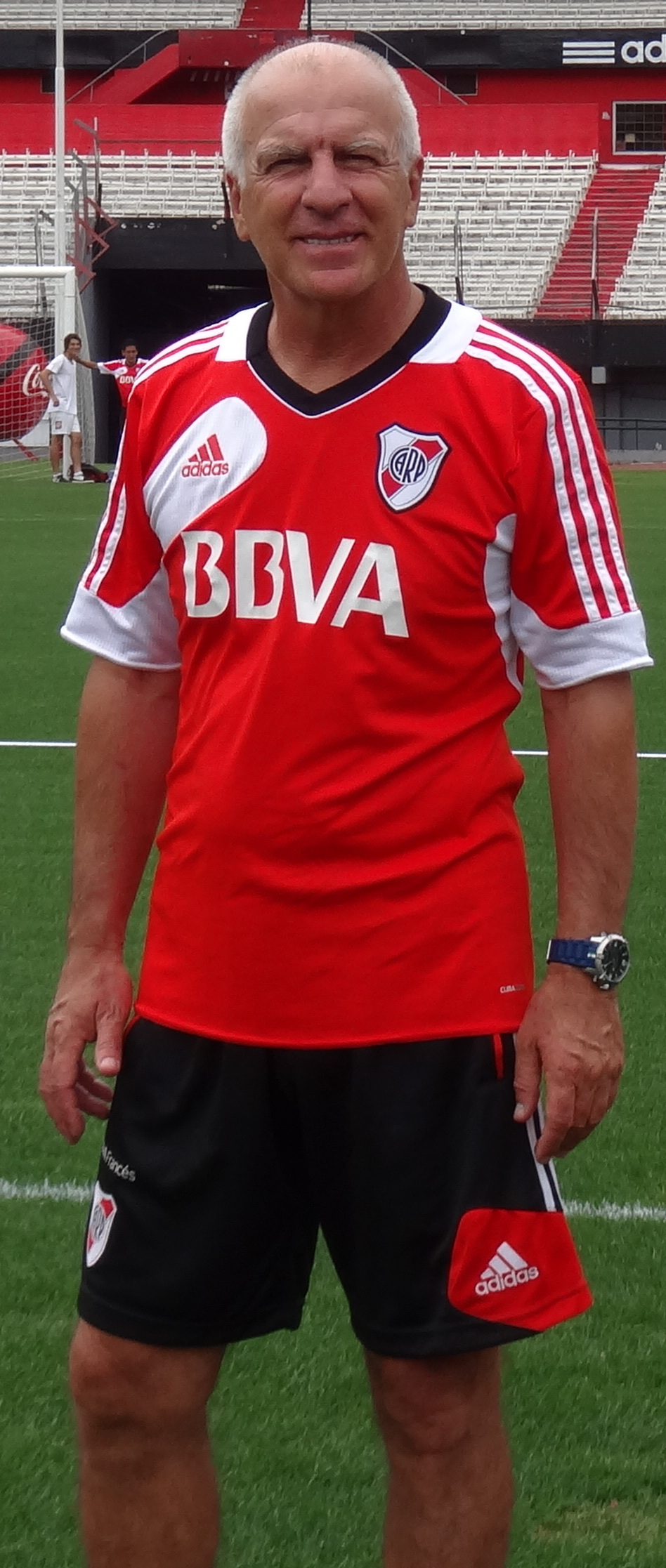

Personal information
- Full name: Ricardo Osvaldo Lazbal
- Date of birth: 21 February 1957 (age 69)
- Place of birth: Buenos Aires, Argentina
- Position: Midfielder

Senior career*
Years	Team	Apps	(Gls)
1976	River Plate	9	(2)
1976	Atlético Ledesma	12	(1)
1977	Gimnasia La Plata	15	(3)
1978–1979	Palestino	53	(8)
1980	All Boys	28	(2)
1980	San Lorenzo	13	(3)
1981–1983	Loma Negra	5	(1)
1984	Gimansia de Mendoza		
1985	Belgrano San Nicolás		
1985–1986	Le Puy		
1986–1987	Roanne		
1987–1989	Moutier		
1989–1991	Montmorillon		

Managerial career
- 1987–1989: Moutier (youth)
- 1989–1991: Montmorillon (youth)
- 1993–2001: Tortugas Country Club
- 1999–2005: River Plate (youth)
- 2006: Quilmes (youth)
- 2007–2009: Chacarita Juniors (youth)
- 2010–2014: River Plate (youth)
- 2015: Germinal Rawson (youth)
- 2016–2017: UTHGRA Bariloche (youth)
- 2018–2021: San Lorenzo de Almagro (youth)
- * Club domestic league appearances and goals

Ricardo Osvaldo Lazbal (born in Buenos Aires, Argentina) is a former Argentine footballer who played for clubs in Argentina, Chile and France.

== Teams ==
- (Argentina) River Plate 1976
- (Argentina) Atlético Ledesma 1976
- (Argentina) Gimnasia y Esgrima de La Plata 1977
- (Chile) Palestino 1978–1979
- (Argentina) All Boys 1980
- (Argentina) San Lorenzo 1980
- (Argentina) Loma Negra 1981–1983
- (Argentina) Gimnasia y Esgrima de Mendoza 1984
- (Argentina) Belgrano de San Nicolás 1985
- (France) Le Puy 1985–1986
- (France) Roanne 1986–1987
- (France) Moutier 1987–1989
- (France) Montmorillon 1989–1991

== Coaching career ==
Lazbal has developed a career as a football teacher, football coach and coordinator for youth players for clubs such as River Plate, Quilmes, San Lorenzo, among others.

== Titles ==
- (Chile) Palestino 1978 (Chilean Primera División Championship)
