= Maximiliano Medina =

Argentine footballer

Personal information
- Date of birth: 18 February 2002 (age 24)
- Place of birth: José C. Paz, Argentina
- Position: Forward

Youth career
- 2012–2015: Renacer
- 2015–2016: Fénix

Senior career*
Years	Team	Apps	(Gls)
2016–2017	Fénix	1	(0)
- * Club domestic league appearances and goals

Maximiliano Medina (born 18 February 2002) is an Argentine former footballer.

== Club career ==
Born in José C. Paz, Buenos Aires, Medina began his career with Renacer at the age of ten. He had been kicked out of school in his freshman year for being too lazy, as he did not like to get up early in the morning, and was solely playing football. A friend who was playing for Fénix told him that Fénix were looking for forwards, and invited him to try-out at the club.

He joined Fénix in 2015, signing a professional contract with the club the following year. Less than a week after signing professional terms, he made his professional debut, coming on as a substitute for Brian Miranda in a 2–2 draw against Barracas Central. In doing so, he became the youngest player to play in the Primera B Metropolitana, and the second in Argentine football history, behind Darío Roa.

== Personal life ==
A Boca Juniors fan, Medina is an admirer of Juan Román Riquelme.

== Career statistics ==
=== Club ===
As of 4 February 2023.

Appearances and goals by club, season and competition
Club	Season	League			Cup		Other		Total	
Club	Season	Division	Apps	Goals	Apps	Goals	Apps	Goals	Apps	Goals
Fénix	2016–17	Primera B Metropolitana	1	0	0	0	0	0	1	0
Career total			1	0	0	0	0	0	1	0
