= Juan Martín Cadelago =

Argentine footballer

Personal information
- Date of birth: January 22, 1989 (age 37)
- Place of birth: Castelar, Argentina
- Height: 1.78 m (5 ft 10 in)
- Position: Defender

Senior career*
Years	Team	Apps	(Gls)
2006-2010	San Lorenzo		
2010-2011	F.C. Südtirol		
2011	Independiente F.B.C.	1	(0)
2012-2013	Deportivo Morón	17	(0)
2015-2017	Fénix	34	(0)
- * Club domestic league appearances and goals

Juan Martín Cadelago (born January 22, 1989, in Castelar, Argentina) is an Argentine footballer currently playing for Independiente F.B.C. of the Primera División in Paraguay.

== Teams ==
- (Argentina) San Lorenzo 2006–2010
- (Italy) F.C. Südtirol 2010
- (Italy) Ilvamaddalena 2010–2011
- (Paraguay) Independiente F.B.C. 2011–2012
- (Argentina) Club Deportivo Morón 2012–2013
- (Italy) Ilvamaddalena 2013–2014
- (Argentina) Club Atlético Fenix 2015-actualidad

== Titles ==
- (Argentina) San Lorenzo 2007 (Torneo Clausura Argentine Championship)

Deportivo Moron 2012-2013
