= Andrés Ariaudo =

Argentine footballer (born 1989)

Personal information
- Date of birth: March 20, 1989 (age 37)
- Place of birth: Monte Buey, Argentina
- Position: Midfielder

Youth career
- Independiente

Senior career*
Years	Team	Apps	(Gls)
2010–2011	Independiente	0	(0)
2011	→ San Luis (loan)	6	(0)
2013	PEF Matienzo	–	(–)
–2018	Matienzo Monte Buey	–	(–)
Medal record
First place	Copa Sudamericana	2010
- * Club domestic league appearances and goals

Andrés Ariaudo (born March 20, 1989) is an Argentine former footballer who played for Independiente in Argentina and for San Luis Quillota of the Primera B Chilena.

== Teams ==
- (Argentina) Independiente 2010
- (Chile) San Luis de Quillota 2011
- (Argentina) PEF Matienzo 2013
- (Argentina) Matienzo de Monte Buey ????–2018
