= Leonardo Luppino =

Argentine footballer

Personal information
- Full name: Leonardo Sebastián Luppino
- Date of birth: 18 January 1975 (age 51)
- Place of birth: Buenos Aires, Argentina
- Height: 1.63 m (5 ft 4 in)
- Position: Midfielder

Youth career
- Deportivo Morón
- Boca Juniors

Senior career*
Years	Team	Apps	(Gls)
1995–1996	Boca Juniors	1	(0)
1996–1997	Almagro	37	(7)
1997	Douglas Haig	13	(0)
1997	Huachipato	13	(0)
1998	Deportivo Quito	22	(7)
1999	Audaz Octubrino	5	(0)
1999–2000	Tigre	28	(3)
2000–2001	Villa Mitre	30	(2)
2001–2002	Jorge Wilstermann	49	(32)
2003	Aurora	22	(12)
2003–2004	Estudiantes LP	9	(0)
2004	Blooming	19	(9)
2005	Emelec	12	(1)
2005	Changchun Yatai	–	(–)
2006	Huracán TA	21	(2)
2006–2007	Sarmiento de Junín	40	(3)
2007–2008	Los Andes	32	(4)
2008–2009	Nueva Chicago	12	(0)
2009–2010	Defensores de Belgrano	28	(3)
2010	Villa Mitre	0	(0)
2010–2011	Midland	16	(4)
2011	Sportivo Del Bono	14	(3)
2012–2013	Defensores Unidos	11	(0)
2013–2015	Belgrano de Zárate	–	(–)
2015	Sportivo Escobar	–	(–)
Total		434	(92)

Managerial career
- Sportivo Escobar (youth)
- * Club domestic league appearances and goals

Leonardo Luppino (born January 18, 1975, in Buenos Aires, Argentina) is a retired Argentine association football midfielder.

== Teams ==
- (Argentina) Boca Juniors 1995-1996
- (Argentina) Almagro 1996-1997
- (Argentina) Douglas Haig 1997
- (Chile) Huachipato 1997
- (Ecuador) Deportivo Quito 1998
- (Ecuador) Audaz Octubrino 1999
- (Argentina) Tigre 1999–2000
- (Argentina) Villa Mitre 2000-2001
- (Bolivia) Jorge Wilstermann 2001-2002
- (Bolivia) Aurora 2003
- (Argentina) Estudiantes de La Plata 2003-2004
- (Bolivia) Blooming 2004
- (Ecuador) Emelec 2005
- (China) Changchun Yatai 2005
- (Argentina) Huracán de Tres Arroyos 2006
- (Argentina) Sarmiento de Junín 2006-2007
- (Argentina) Los Andes 2007–2008
- (Argentina) Nueva Chicago 2008–2009
- (Argentina) Defensores de Belgrano 2009–2010
- (Argentina) Villa Mitre 2010
- (Argentina) Ferrocarril Midland 2011
- (Argentina) Sportivo Del Bono 2011
- (Argentina) Defensores Unidos 2012–2013
- (Argentina) Belgrano de Zárate 2013-2015
- (Argentina) Sportivo Escobar 2015
