= Rodrigo Salomón =

Argentine footballer

Rodrigo Fernando Salomón (born July 27, 1980, in Temperley, Argentina) is an Argentine association football defender last played for Paysandu of the Serie C in Brazil.

== Teams ==
- (Argentina) Temperley 1999–2005
- (Paraguay) General Caballero 2005
- (Argentina) Temperley 2006–2008
- (Costa Rica) Pérez Zeledón 2008–2010
- (Brazil) Paysandu 2011
- (Argentina) Midland 2012–2013
- (Argentina) Talleres since 2013
