= Favio Márquez =

Argentine footballer

Favio César Márquez (born 30 January 1974 in Morón (Buenos Aires), Argentina) is an Argentine former professional footballer who played as a forward for clubs of Argentina, Chile and Portugal.

== Clubs ==
- Boca Juniors 1995–1996
- Santiago Wanderers 1999
- Académico de Viseu 2000
- Provincial Osorno 2000–2001
