= Walter Capozucchi =

Argentine footballer (born 1967)

Personal information
- Full name: Walter Aldo Capozucchi
- Date of birth: 7 February 1967 (age 59)
- Place of birth: San Isidro, Buenos Aires, Argentina
- Height: 1.83 m (6 ft 0 in)
- Position: Midfielder

Senior career*
Years	Team	Apps	(Gls)
1986–1990	Platense	135	(3)
1991–1993	Atlético Tucumán	79	(4)
1993–1994	All Boys	6	(0)
1994–1995	Everton		
1996	Sportivo Italiano	12	(0)
1997	Los Andes	16	(0)
1998	C.S.D. Comunicaciones		
1998–1999	Juventud Escuintleca		
- * Club domestic league appearances and goals

Walter Aldo Capozucchi (born 7 February 1967) is an Argentine former professional footballer who played as a midfielder for clubs of Argentina, Chile and Guatemala.
