= Alexis Danelón =

Argentine footballer (born 1986)

Personal information
- Full name: Alexis Raúl Danelón
- Date of birth: January 6, 1986 (age 40)
- Place of birth: Capitán Bermúdez, Argentina
- Height: 1.73 m (5 ft 8 in)
- Position: Full back

Senior career*
Years	Team	Apps	(Gls)
2007–2011	Rosario Central	47	(4)
2011–2012	Boca Unidos	32	(2)
2012–2013	Huracán	27	(2)
2013–2015	Boca Unidos	41	(2)
2016	Central Córdoba SdE	13	(0)
- * Club domestic league appearances and goals as of 3 February 2018

Alexis Raúl Danelón (born 6 January 1986 in Capitán Bermúdez) is an Argentine football defender who last played for Central Córdoba SdE.

Danelón made his professional debut on November 9, 2007, in a 4–1 home defeat to Lanús, and scored his first goal in professional football in a 4–2 win over Tigre on May 30, 2008. He scored again versus Estudiantes de La Plata on August 9, 2008
