= Javier Grandoli =

Argentine footballer

Personal information
- Full name: Javier Aníbal Grandoli
- Date of birth: 25 July 1969 (age 57)
- Place of birth: Paraná, Entre Ríos, Argentina
- Position: Forward

Senior career*
Years	Team	Apps	(Gls)
1980–1985	Belgrano		
1986	Atlético Paraná		
1986	Fernández Vial	18	(4)
1987	Lota Schwager	6	(0)
1988–1991	Provincial Osorno		
1992	Deportes Arica		(2)
1993	Deportes Puerto Montt		
1993	Deportes La Serena	11	(2)
1994	Deportes Ovalle	19	(1)
- * Club domestic league appearances and goals

Javier Aníbal Grandoli (born 25 July 1969 in Córdoba, Argentina) is a former Argentine footballer who played for clubs of Argentina and Chile.

== Teams ==
- (Argentina) Belgrano 1980–1985
- (Argentina) Atlético Paraná 1986
- (Chile) Fernández Vial 1986
- (Chile) Lota Schwager 1987
- (Chile) Provincial Osorno 1988–1991
- (Chile) Deportes Arica 1992
- (Chile) Deportes Puerto Montt 1993
- (Chile) Deportes La Serena 1993
- (Chile) Deportes Ovalle 1994
