= José Bellingi =

Argentine footballer (born 1988)

Francisco Bellingi
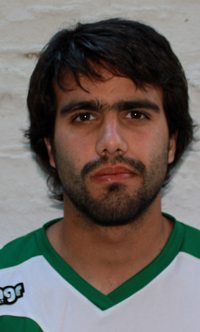

Personal information
- Full name: Francisco José Bellingi
- Date of birth: 8 July 1988 (age 38)
- Place of birth: La Plata, Argentina
- Height: 1.78 m (5 ft 10 in)
- Position: Defender

Senior career*
Years	Team	Apps	(Gls)
2011–2012	Plaza Colonia	27	(0)
2013	Santiago Morning	6	(0)
2013–2014	Atlético Sanluqueño	21	(0)
2015	Sarmiento de Leones	9	(0)
2016	Libertad de Sunchales	5	(0)
2016–2018	Guaraní AF	20	(0)
- * Club domestic league appearances and goals as of 3 April 2020

Francisco José Bellingi (born 8 July 1988) was an Argentine footballer.

He played for then Segunda División B side Atlético Sanluqueño CF as a defender.
