= Bernardo Vargas =

Argentine footballer

Personal information
- Date of birth: March 31, 1939 (age 87)
- Place of birth: Mendoza, Argentina
- Position: Defender

Senior career*
Years	Team	Apps	(Gls)
1957–1960	Talleres Cordoba		
1960–1961	Racing	20	(0)
1962–1963	Argentinos Juniors	8	(0)
1964	Club América		
1965–1968	Toronto Italia		
1967–1968	Toronto Falcons	23	(4)
1968	Rochester Lancers		
1969–1970	Toronto Hungaria		
- * Club domestic league appearances and goals

Bernardo Vargas (born March 31, 1939) is an Argentine former footballer who played as a defender.

== Career ==
Vargas played with Talleres Cordoba in 1958. In 1960, he played in the Argentine Primera División with Racing, and later with Argentinos Juniors. In 1964, he played in the Mexican Primera División with Club América. In 1965, he played in the Eastern Canada Professional Soccer League with Toronto Italia, where he secured an ECPSL Championship in 1966. He played with Toronto Falcons originally in the National Professional Soccer League in 1967, and later in the North American Soccer League.

In 1968, he played in the American Soccer League with Rochester Lancers. The following season he returned to Canada to play in the National Soccer League with Toronto Hungaria. He re-signed with Toronto for the 1970 season.
