= Hector Pizorno =

Argentine footballer

Personal information
- Full name: Hector Rafeal Pizorno
- Date of birth: 10 May 1934
- Place of birth: Rosario, Santa Fe, Argentina
- Date of death: 18 January 2023 (aged 88)
- Place of death: Rosario, Santa Fe, Argentina
- Position: Forward

Senior career*
Years	Team	Apps	(Gls)
1953–1954	Newell's Old Boys	6	(0)
1961	Polish White Eagles		
1961	→ Hamilton Steelers (loan)	1	(0)
1961	Toronto Roma		
- * Club domestic league appearances and goals

Hector Pizorno (born May 10, 1934) was an Argentine former footballer.

== Career ==
Pizorno played in the Argentine Primera División in 1953 with Newell's Old Boys. In 1961, he played abroad in the National Soccer League with the Polish White Eagles. During his tenure with Toronto he featured in the Dominion Cup tournament against Toronto Roma. He was loaned for a match to the Hamilton Steelers in the Eastern Canada Professional Soccer League. The remainder of the season he played with Toronto Roma.

== Personal life ==
His twin brother Angelo was also a footballer.
