= Luis Lagrutta =

Argentine footballer

Personal information
- Full name: Luis María Lagrutta
- Date of birth: April 28, 1988 (age 38)
- Place of birth: Rafaela, Santa Fe, Argentina
- Height: 1.69 m (5 ft 6 1/2 in)
- Position: Attacking midfielder

Team information
- Current team: 9 de Julio de Rafaela

Youth career
- Atlético de Rafaela

Senior career*
Years	Team	Apps	(Gls)
2007–2013	Atlético de Rafaela	44	(3)
2011–2012	→ Boca Unidos (loan)	12	(1)
2013	→ Ferro Carril Oeste (loan)	6	(0)
2013–	9 de Julio		
- * Club domestic league appearances and goals as of 21 April 2015

Luis María Lagrutta (born April 28, 1988, in Rafaela, Santa Fe) is an Argentine footballer who currently plays for 9 de Julio de Rafaela in the Torneo Argentino B.

== Honours ==
Atlético de Rafaela

- Primera B Nacional (1): 2010–11
