= Juan Manuel Bordaberry =

Argentine footballer

Personal information
- Date of birth: February 18, 1985 (age 41)
- Place of birth: Laprida, Buenos Aires, Argentina
- Height: 1.73 m (5 ft 8 in)
- Position: Defender

Senior career*
Years	Team	Apps	(Gls)
2003–2004	Racing		
2005	Ciclón		
2006–2007	Sportivo Italiano	6	(0)
2007	Defensores de Belgrano	5	(0)
2008	Estudiantes		
2008–2009	Racing de Olavarría	15	(2)
2010–2011	Ferrocarril Sud	29	(7)
2011–2015	Deportivo Madryn	92	(11)
2013	→ Deportes Concepción (loan)	4	(0)
2016–2017	Deportivo Roca	29	(2)
2017–2019	Juan Jose Moreno	24	(2)
- * Club domestic league appearances and goals

Juan Manuel Bordaberry (born February 18, 1985, in Laprida (Buenos Aires), Argentina) is an Argentine former professional footballer who played as a defender.
