= Vitor Castro =

Brazilian footballer

Vítor Castro
Personal information
- Full name: Vitor Castro de Souza
- Date of birth: February 27, 1988 (age 38)
- Place of birth: Rio de Janeiro, Brazil
- Height: 1.80 m (5 ft 11 in)
- Position: Striker

Team information
- Current team: Tuna Luso

Youth career
- 2005–2006: Botafogo

Senior career*
Years	Team	Apps	(Gls)
2007–2009	Botafogo	1	(0)
2008	→ Örebro SK (loan)	0	(0)
2011	Ponte Preta	0	(0)
2011–	Tuna Luso		
- * Club domestic league appearances and goals

Vítor Castro de Souza (born February 27, 1988, in Rio de Janeiro) is a Brazilian striker. He currently plays for Tuna Luso.

Castro made his professional debut at Botafogo in a 5–2 home win against Centro Sportivo Alagoano in the Brazilian Cup on January 1, 2007.

== Honours ==
- Rio de Janeiro Cup: 2007

=== AS Vita Club ===
- Linafoot : 2nd (2012)
- Kagame Interclub Cup : Runner up (2012)

== Contract ==
1 March 2006 to 28 February 2009
