= Daniel Cangialosi =

Argentine footballer

Personal information
- Date of birth: 5 July 1971 (age 55)
- Place of birth: Junín, Buenos Aires, Argentina
- Position: Forward

Senior career*
Years	Team	Apps	(Gls)
1991–1994	Sarmiento de Junín	54	(17)
1994–1995	Vélez Sarsfield	8	(0)
1995	Platense	10	(1)
1996–1998	Deportes Concepción		
1999	Audax Italiano		
2000–2001	Sarmiento de Junín	16	(3)
- * Club domestic league appearances and goals

Daniel Cangialosi (born 5 July 1971) is an Argentine former professional footballer who played as a forward for clubs of Argentina and Chile.
