= Ariel Reyes =

Argentine footballer

Ariel Griseldo Reyes
Personal information
- Full name: Ariel Griseldo Reyes
- Date of birth: June 11, 1987 (age 39)
- Place of birth: Florencio Varela, Argentina
- Height: 1.72 m (5 ft 8 in)
- Position: Midfielder

Team information
- Current team: Estudiantes de la Plata

Youth career
- –2007: Estudiantes de la Plata

Senior career*
Years	Team	Apps	(Gls)
2007–	Estudiantes de la Plata	2	(0)
2007–2008	→ Ferro Carril Oeste (loan)	19	(0)
2008–2009	→ FC Locarno (loan)	21	(2)
- * Club domestic league appearances and goals as of 07:31, 7 October 2008 (UTC)

Ariel Griseldo Reyes (born 11 June 1987 in Florencio Varela) is an Argentine association footballer who plays for Estudiantes de la Plata.

== Career ==
Reyes began his career with Estudiantes de la Plata and played than from January 2007 to June 2008 for Ferro Carril Oeste. After his return from Ferro Carril Oeste to Estudiantes de la Plata joined on 26 August 2008 to FC Locarno on loan for one season.
