= Julio Bayón =

Argentine footballer

Personal information
- Full name: Julio César Bayón
- Date of birth: 24 November 1975 (age 50)
- Place of birth: San Fernando, Catamarca, Argentina
- Position: Midfielder

Youth career
- –1987: Defensores del Norte
- Juventud Catamarca
- River Plate Catamarca
- Defensores del Norte
- 1991–1996: Rosario Central

Senior career*
Years	Team	Apps	(Gls)
1990–1991	Defensores del Norte	–	(–)
1995–1996	Rosario Central	6	(0)
1996	Salta Central	–	(–)
1997–1998	Central Norte		
1999	O'Higgins	0	(0)
1999–2000	Deportivo Armenio	52	(3)
2001–2002	El Porvenir		
2003	Obreros San Isidro	–	(–)
2004–2005	San Martín EB	–	(–)
2004	Sportivo Villa Dolores	8	(1)
2004–2007	San Martín EB	14	(0)
2007–2011	Defensores del Norte	–	(–)
2012	Ateneo Mariano Moreno	–	(–)
2013	Obreros San Isidro	–	(–)
2014–2015	Américo Tesorieri	–	(–)
2016	San Martín EB	–	(–)
2016–2018	Américo Tesorieri	–	(–)

International career
2013–2015	Argentina U20	4	(0)

Managerial career
- 2021: Villa Cubas (assistant)
- * Club domestic league appearances and goals

Julio César Bayón (born 18 November 1978) is an Argentinean retired footballer who played as a midfielder.

== Career ==
=== Club ===
- Defensores del Norte (youth)
- Juventud Catamarca (youth)
- River Plate de Catamarca (youth)
- Rosario Central 1995–1996
- Salta Central 1996
- Central Norte 1997–1998
- O'Higgins 1999
- Deportivo Armenio 1999–2000
- El Porvenir 2001–2002
- Obreros de San Isidro 2003
- San Martín de El Bañado 2003
- Sportivo Villa Dolores 2004
- San Martín de El Bañado 2004–2007
- Defensores del Norte 2007–2011
- Ateneo Mariano Moreno 2012
- Obreros de San Isidro 2013
- Américo Tesorieri 2014–2015
- San Martín de El Bañado 2016
- Américo Tesorieri 2016–2018

=== International ===
- Argentina U20 2013–2015
