= Ives Quintana =

Argentine footballer

Personal information
- Full name: Ives Fabián Quintana
- Date of birth: 23 December 1983 (age 42)
- Place of birth: Mendoza, Argentina
- Height: 1.71 m (5 ft 7 in)
- Position: Forward

Senior career*
Years	Team	Apps	(Gls)
2002–2003	Miramar Misiones	37	(1)
2004	Sud América		
2005	Unión San Felipe	3	(0)
2005	Sud América		
2006	Cerro Largo	10	(0)
2006–2007	Deportivo Jutiapa		
2007–2008	Deportivo Marquense		
2009–2010	Trentino		
2011	ESPOLI	21	(0)
2011–2014	Sestri Levante		
- * Club domestic league appearances and goals

Ives Fabián Quintana (born December 23, 1983, in Mendoza, Argentina) is an Argentine former footballer who played as a forward.

== Teams ==
- (Uruguay) Miramar Misiones 2002–2003
- (Uruguay) Sud América 2004
- (Chile) Unión San Felipe 2005
- (Uruguay) Sud América 2005
- (Uruguay) Cerro Largo 2006
- (Guatemala) Deportivo Jutiapa 2006–2007
- (Guatemala) Deportivo Marquense 2007–2008
- (Italy) Trentino 2009–2010
- (Ecuador) ESPOLI 2011
- (Italy) Sestri Levante 2011-2014
