= Franco Lefiñir =

Argentine footballer

Personal information
- Full name: Franco Maximiliano Lefiñir
- Date of birth: 23 October 1988 (age 38)
- Place of birth: Bahía Blanca, Argentina
- Position: Midfielder

Team information
- Current team: Tiro Federal BB

Senior career*
Years	Team	Apps	(Gls)
2007–2012	Tiro Federal BB	13	
2012–2013	Racing de Trelew	27	(4)
2013–2018	Tiro Federal BB	90	(12)
2018–2020	Olimpo	28	(0)
2020–2023	Liniers BB	58	(3)
2024	Huracán de White	–	(–)
2025–	Tiro Federal BB	1	(0)
- * Club domestic league appearances and goals as of 17 May 2025

Franco Maximiliano Lefiñir (born 23 October 1998) is an Argentine professional footballer who plays as a midfielder for Tiro Federal de Bahía Blanca.

== Career ==
Tiro Federal de Bahía Blanca gave Lefiñir his start in senior football in 2007, with the midfielder featuring for the Torneo Argentino C club as they suffered 2009 relegation. 2012 saw Lefiñir join Racing de Trelew in Torneo Argentino B, remaining for one season whilst making twenty-seven appearances and scoring four goals. He returned to Tiro Federal ahead of the 2013–14 campaign, with the club now in the fourth tier. In the succeeding season, Tiro Federal were promoted to Torneo Federal A. His first goals at that level arrived on 22 May 2015 during a match away to General Belgrano, netting a brace in a 0–3 victory. Three further goals came.

In 2016, having netted another double away to General Belgrano, Tiro Federal were relegated to Torneo Federal B. Two years later, in June 2018, Lefiñir completed a move to Primera B Nacional's Olimpo. He made his professional debut against Sarmiento on 26 August.

After playing for Liniers de Bahía Blanca from 2020 to 2023, Lefiñir signed with Huracán de White for the 2024 season. The next year, he returned to Tiro Federal de Bahía Blanca.

== Personal life ==
His father is Chilean.

His surname, Lefiñir, comes from "lefi gürü" in Mapuche language what means "running fox".

In May 2016, Lefiñir was hospitalised due to carbon monoxide poisoning. He was discharged soon after, having not lost consciousness during the incident.

== Career statistics ==
As of 4 March 2019.

Appearances and goals by club, season and competition
Club	Season	League			Cup		Continental		Other		Total	
Club	Season	Division	Apps	Goals	Apps	Goals	Apps	Goals	Apps	Goals	Apps	Goals
Racing de Trelew	2012–13	Torneo Argentino B	27	4	0	0	—		0	0	27	4
Tiro Federal	2015	Torneo Federal A	27	5	0	0	—		0	0	27	5
Tiro Federal	2016	Torneo Federal A	10	2	0	0	—		0	0	10	2
Tiro Federal	Total		37	7	0	0	—		0	0	37	7
Olimpo	2018–19	Primera B Nacional	12	0	0	0	—		0	0	12	0
Career total			76	11	0	0	—		0	0	76	11
