= Néstor Di Luca =

Argentine footballer (born 1955)

Personal information
- Full name: Néstor Rubén Di Luca
- Date of birth: 8 April 1955 (age 71)
- Place of birth: Tres Arroyos, Argentina
- Position: Forward

Senior career*
Years	Team	Apps	(Gls)
1977–1979	Independiente	5	(0)
1980–1981	San Lorenzo MdP	35	(10)
1982	Huracán	9	(1)
1983–1984	Universidad de Chile	47	(19)
1985–1989	Huracán	36	(7)
1990–1991	Huracán TA	–	(–)
Total		132+	(37+)
- * Club domestic league appearances and goals

Néstor Rubén Di Luca (born April 8, 1955, in Tres Arroyos (Buenos Aires), Argentina) is a former Argentine footballer who played for clubs of Argentina and Chile.

== Teams ==
- (Argentina) Independiente 1977–1979
- (Argentina) San Lorenzo de Mar del Plata 1980–1981
- (Argentina) Huracán 1982
- Universidad de Chile 1983–1984
- (Argentina) Huracán 1985–1989
- (Argentina) Huracán de Tres Arroyos 1990-1991
