= Dimas Morales =

Argentine footballer

Personal information
- Full name: Dimas Ezequiel Morales
- Date of birth: 22 June 1994 (age 32)
- Place of birth: Mar del Plata, Argentina
- Height: 1.77 m (5 ft 10 in)
- Position: Left-back

Youth career
- San Lorenzo

Senior career*
Years	Team	Apps	(Gls)
2013–2017	Atlético de Rafaela	10	(0)
2016	→ Santamarina (loan)	0	(0)
2016–2017	→ Ferro Carril Oeste (loan)	6	(0)
2017–2018	Club Atletico Nación		
2018	San Lorenzo Mar del Plata		
2018–2020	Los Andes	31	(0)
2020	Sud América	8	(0)
2022	Los Patos FC		
- * Club domestic league appearances and goals as of 16:13, 7 August 2022 (UTC)

Dimas Ezequiel Morales (born 22 June 1994) is an Argentine professional footballer who plays as a left-back.

== Career ==
San Lorenzo were Morales' first club, though he soon joined Atlético de Rafaela. He made his senior bow in a Copa Argentina round of sixteen tie with San Lorenzo in June 2013, appearing for the full ninety minutes of a 0–3 loss. His Primera División debut arrived on 8 August against Lanús, which was the second of twelve total appearances for the club. In his time with Atlético de Rafaela, Morales was loaned to Santamarina and Ferro Carril Oeste; he didn't feature competitively for Santamarina, though did participate six times for Ferro Carril Oeste. Regional team Club Atletico Nación signed Morales in 2017.

June 2018 saw Morales, coming off a stint with San Lorenzo Mar del Plata, join Los Andes. His first appearance came in a loss to Independiente Rivadavia on 25 August. He was released in June 2020.

On 15 October 2020, Morales moved to Uruguayan club Sud América.

== Career statistics ==
As of 10 July 2020.

Appearances and goals by club, season and competition
Club	Season	League			Cup		Continental		Other		Total	
Club	Season	Division	Apps	Goals	Apps	Goals	Apps	Goals	Apps	Goals	Apps	Goals
Atlético de Rafaela	2012–13	Primera División	0	0	1	0	—		0	0	1	0
Atlético de Rafaela	2013–14	Primera División	1	0	0	0	—		0	0	1	0
Atlético de Rafaela	2014	Primera División	0	0	0	0	—		0	0	0	0
Atlético de Rafaela	2015	Primera División	9	0	1	0	—		0	0	10	0
Atlético de Rafaela	2016	Primera División	0	0	0	0	—		0	0	0	0
Atlético de Rafaela	2016–17	Primera División	0	0	0	0	—		0	0	0	0
Atlético de Rafaela	Total		10	0	2	0	—		0	0	12	0
Santamarina (loan)	2016	Primera B Nacional	0	0	0	0	—		0	0	0	0
Ferro Carril Oeste (loan)	2016–17	Primera B Nacional	6	0	0	0	—		0	0	6	0
Los Andes	2018–19	Primera B Nacional	17	0	0	0	—		0	0	17	0
Los Andes	2019–20	Primera B Metropolitana	14	0	0	0	—		0	0	14	0
Los Andes	Total		31	0	0	0	—		0	0	31	0
Career total			47	0	2	0	—		0	0	49	0
