= Gonzalo Favre =

Argentine footballer (born 1978)

Personal information
- Full name: Gonzalo Adrián Favre
- Date of birth: 3 July 1978 (age 48)
- Place of birth: San Carlos Centro, Argentina
- Height: 1.78 m (5 ft 10 in)
- Position: Midfielder

Senior career*
Years	Team	Apps	(Gls)
1998–2001	Colón de Santa Fe	29	(0)
2001–2002	Rangers	35	(1)
Total		64	(1)
- * Club domestic league appearances and goals

Gonzalo Adrián Favre (born 3 July 1978) is an Argentine former professional footballer who played as a midfielder for Colón de Santa Fe in Argentina and Rangers in Chile.

== Career ==
- Colón de Santa Fe 1998–2001
- Rangers 2001–2002
