= Ezequiel Córdoba =

Argentine footballer

Personal information
- Full name: Carlos Ezequiel Córdoba
- Date of birth: 6 June 1995 (age 31)
- Place of birth: Mendoza, Argentina
- Height: 1.70 m (5 ft 7 in)
- Position: Midfielder

Team information
- Current team: Leonardo Murialdo

Youth career
- 2005–2008: Deportivo Maipú
- 2008–2015: Independiente Rivadavia

Senior career*
Years	Team	Apps	(Gls)
2015–2018	Independiente Rivadavia	1	(0)
2018–	Leonardo Murialdo		
- * Club domestic league appearances and goals

Carlos Ezequiel Córdoba (born 6 June 1995) is an Argentine footballer who plays as a midfielder for Leonardo Murialdo.

== Career ==
Córdoba featured for Deportivo Maipú's academy from 2005, departing three years later to Independiente Rivadavia's youth. 2015 saw Córdoba move into their first-team for the upcoming Primera B Nacional campaign, initially appearing as an unused substitute in July for fixtures with Sportivo Belgrano and Unión Mar del Plata. He made his professional debut on 2 August 2015 in a goalless draw at the Estadio José Antonio Romero Feris against Boca Unidos. Córdoba stayed until 2018 though didn't make any more appearances. After leaving Independiente Rivadavia, he signed with Leonardo Murialdo of Liga Mendocina.

== Career statistics ==
As of 31 January 2019.

Club statistics
Club	Season	League			Cup		Continental		Other		Total	
Club	Season	Division	Apps	Goals	Apps	Goals	Apps	Goals	Apps	Goals	Apps	Goals
Independiente Rivadavia	2015	Primera B Nacional	1	0	0	0	—		0	0	1	0
Independiente Rivadavia	2016	Primera B Nacional	0	0	0	0	—		0	0	0	0
Independiente Rivadavia	2016–17	Primera B Nacional	0	0	0	0	—		0	0	0	0
Independiente Rivadavia	2017–18	Primera B Nacional	0	0	0	0	—		0	0	0	0
Career total			1	0	0	0	—		0	0	1	0
