= Enzo Tejada =

Argentine footballer

Personal information
- Full name: Enzo Nahuel Tejada
- Date of birth: 27 January 1997 (age 29)
- Place of birth: Las Heras, Argentina
- Height: 1.72 m (5 ft 7 1/2 in)
- Position: Midfielder

Team information
- Current team: Huracán Las Heras

Youth career
- Huracán Las Heras

Senior career*
Years	Team	Apps	(Gls)
2015–2018	Gimnasia y Esgrima	11	(0)
2015	→ Internacional (loan)	0	(0)
2016–2017	→ Unión Santa Fe (loan)	0	(0)
2019	Fundación Amigos	6	(3)
2019–	Huracán Las Heras	9	(0)
- * Club domestic league appearances and goals as of 18:16, 14 July 2020 (UTC)

Enzo Nahuel Tejada (born 27 January 1997) is an Argentine professional footballer who plays as a midfielder for Huracán Las Heras.

== Career ==
Tejada's career began with Huracán Las Heras, before a move to Gimnasia y Esgrima. He was promoted into the first-team by manager Sergio Arias in the 2015 Primera B Nacional campaign, appearing for his professional debut on 21 March during a 5–1 defeat to Guaraní Antonio Franco. Four further appearances followed as Gimnasia y Esgrima suffered relegation to Torneo Federal A. In the middle of the campaign, in June 2015, Tejada was loaned by Internacional of Brazil's Série A. On 5 August 2016, Tejada joined Primera División side Unión Santa Fe on loan. He didn't make an appearance for either of the two.

Tejada left Gimnasia y Esgrima in 2018. On 18 January 2019, Tejada signed with Fundación Amigos ahead of the inaugural Torneo Regional Federal Amateur. Seven months later, having scored his first three senior goals in the fourth tier, Tejada moved to Torneo Federal A to rejoin Huracán Las Heras.

== Career statistics ==
As of 14 July 2020.

Club statistics
Club	Season	League			Cup		League Cup		Continental		Other		Total	
Club	Season	Division	Apps	Goals	Apps	Goals	Apps	Goals	Apps	Goals	Apps	Goals	Apps	Goals
Gimnasia y Esgrima	2015	Primera B Nacional	5	0	0	0	—		—		0	0	5	0
Gimnasia y Esgrima	2016	Torneo Federal A	4	0	0	0	—		—		0	0	4	0
Gimnasia y Esgrima	2016–17	Torneo Federal A	0	0	0	0	—		—		0	0	0	0
Gimnasia y Esgrima	2017–18	Torneo Federal A	2	0	0	0	—		—		0	0	2	0
Gimnasia y Esgrima	Total		11	0	0	0	—		—		0	0	11	0
Internacional (loan)	2015	Série A	0	0	0	0	—		0	0	0	0	0	0
Unión Santa Fe (loan)	2016–17	Primera División	0	0	0	0	—		—		0	0	0	0
Fundación Amigos	2019	Torneo Regional Federal Amateur	6	3	0	0	—		—		0	0	6	3
Huracán Las Heras	2019–20	Torneo Federal A	9	0	0	0	—		—		0	0	9	0
Career total			27	3	0	0	—		0	0	0	0	27	3
