= Mariano Almandoz =

Argentine footballer

Personal information
- Full name: Luis Mariano Almandoz
- Date of birth: 10 January 1994 (age 32)
- Place of birth: Rauch, Argentina
- Height: 1.77 m (5 ft 10 in)
- Position: Defender

Youth career
- Argentinos Juniors

Senior career*
Years	Team	Apps	(Gls)
2013–2017	Argentinos Juniors	5	(0)
2016	→ Comunicaciones (loan)	5	(0)
2017	→ Temuco (loan)	1	(0)
- * Club domestic league appearances and goals as of 12:16, 8 March 2021 (UTC)

Luis Mariano Almandoz (born 10 January 1994) is an Argentine football.

He has played for clubs like Argentinos Juniors or Chile's Deportes Temuco.
