= Ricky Aramendi =

Argentinian-born Spanish footballer

Personal information
- Birth name: Héctor Ricardo Aramendi Rueda
- Date of birth: 27 March 1937 (age 89)
- Place of birth: Buenos Aires, Argentina
- Height: 1.81 m (5 ft 11 in)
- Position: Forward

Senior career*
Years	Team	Apps	(Gls)
1955–1959	Huracán	14	(0)
1959–1964	Valladolid	95	(16)
1964–1966	Mallorca	16	(0)
1966–1967	Xerez	26	(6)
Total		151	(22)
- * Club domestic league appearances and goals

Héctor Ricardo "Ricky" Aramendi Rueda (born March 27, 1937) is an Argentinian-born Spanish former professional footballer who played as a forward.

== Career ==
Aramendi began playing his career in 1955 for playing Huracán. He played for the club until 1959, that year when he moved to Spain to join staff of Real Valladolid when terminated his contract in 1964, he signed by the RCD Mallorca, where remains until 1966. In 1967 Aramendi was on the campus of Xerez, where he finally retired professional football and ended his career at age of 30.
