= Hernán Villalba =

Paraguayan footballer (born 1989)

Raúl Hernán Villalba
Personal information
- Full name: Raúl Hernán Villalba
- Date of birth: 9 February 1989 (age 37)
- Place of birth: Rosario, Argentina
- Height: 1.76 m (5 ft 9 1/2 in)
- Position: Midfielder

Team information
- Current team: Agropecuario Argentino

Youth career
- Newell's Old Boys

Senior career*
Years	Team	Apps	(Gls)
2010–2016	Newell's Old Boys	128	(0)
2016–2017	Olimpia Asunción	9	(0)
2017–	Agropecuario Argentino	?	(?)

International career
2015–	Paraguay	1	(0)
- * Club domestic league appearances and goals as of 4 December 2017

Raúl Hernán Villalba (born 9 February 1989), is a Paraguayan professional footballer who plays for Club Agropecuario Argentino as a midfielder.

== Career ==
Villalba has played with Newell's Old Boys for his entire football career. Despite being born and raised in Argentina, Villalba was called up and debuted for the Paraguay national football team in a 1–0 loss against Peru, in October 2015. He was eligible to represent Paraguay through his parents, who are of Paraguayan descent.

== Honours ==
Newell's Old Boys

- Argentine Primera División 2012–13
