= Roque Burella =

Argentine footballer

Personal information
- Full name: Roque Germán Burella
- Date of birth: September 24, 1970 (age 56)
- Place of birth: Luján, Buenos Aires, Argentina
- Position: Forward

Senior career*
Years	Team	Apps	(Gls)
1991-1992	Luján	15	(4)
1992-1993	Manning Rangers		
1993-1994	Leandro N. Alem		
1994-1995	Luján	16	(5)
1995	Provincial Osorno	29	(5)
1996	O'Higgins	20	(9)
1996-1997	Elche		
1997-1999	Deportivo Español	33	(7)
1999-2000	Villa Mitre	9	(1)
- * Club domestic league appearances and goals

Roque Germán Burella (born September 24, 1970, in Luján, Buenos Aires) is an Argentine former professional footballer who played as a forward for clubs in Argentina, Chile, Spain and South Africa.

== Teams ==
- Luján 1991–1992
- Manning Rangers 1992–1993
- Leandro N. Alem 1993–1994
- Luján 1994–1995
- Provincial Osorno 1995
- O'Higgins 1996
- Elche 1996–1997
- Deportivo Español 1997–1999
- Villa Mitre 1999–2000
