= Germán Alecha =

Argentine footballer

Personal information
- Full name: Germán Federico Alecha
- Date of birth: 29 July 1985 (age 41)
- Place of birth: La Plata, Argentina
- Height: 1.85 m (6 ft 1 in)
- Position: Striker

Senior career*
| Years | Team | Apps | (Gls) |
| 2002–2014 | Cipolletti | 147 | (50) |
| 2005 | → Guillermo Brown (loan) | 7 | (0) |
| 2006 | → Villa Mitre (loan) | 1 | (0) |
| 2007–2008 | → San Martín Mendoza (loan) | 31 | (4) |
| 2010–2011 | → Huracán TA (loan) | 23 | (5) |
| 2011 | → Unión San Felipe (loan) | 8 | (0) |
| 2014 | Alianza Cutral Có | 1 | (0) |
| Total | | 218 | (59) |

Managerial career
- 2015–2021: Cipolletti (youth)
- 2018: Cipolletti (interim)
- 2022: Cipolletti
- * Club domestic league appearances and goals

Germán Federico Alecha (born 29 July 1985) is a former Argentine association football striker.

== Career ==
A product of Cipolletti, Alecha made his debut with them at the age of seventeen.

In his homeland, he played on loan for Guillermo Brown de Puerto Madryn, Villa Mitre, San Martín de Mendoza and Huracán de Tres Arroyos.

After leaving Cipolletti, Alecha signed with Alianza de Cutral Có in July 2014.

Abroad, he played for Chilean club Unión San Felipe in the 2011 Torneo Clausura.

Following his retirement, Alecha joined the Cipoletti youth system as coach in February 2015 and led the first team several times as an interim manager. As a head coach, he led Cipolletti in the 2022 Torneo Federal A.
