= Ezequiel Echeverría =

Argentine footballer

Personal information
- Full name: Ezequiel Alfredo Echeverría
- Date of birth: 12 March 1985 (age 41)
- Place of birth: Buenos Aires, Argentina
- Height: 1.75 m (5 ft 9 in)
- Position: Defender

Team information
- Current team: Sport Tres Algarrobos (manager)

Senior career*
Years	Team	Apps	(Gls)
2004–2007	Ferro Carril Oeste	52	(1)
2007–2008	Centro Ítalo	8	(1)
2009–2010	Ferro General Pico	–	(–)
2010	Naval	3	(0)
2013	Sport Tres Algarrobos	–	(–)
2013–2015	FC Tres Algarrobos	25	(2)
Total		88	(4)

Managerial career
- 2017–2022: FC Tres Algarrobos
- 2022–2023: Ingeniero White Banderaló
- 2024–: Sport Tres Algarrobos
- * Club domestic league appearances and goals

Ezequiel Alfredo Echeverría (born 12 March 1985 in Buenos Aires, Argentina) is an Argentine football manager and former player.

== Teams ==
He played in the second tiers of Argentina, Venezuela and Chile. He started out his professional career in the Primera B Nacional for Ferro Carril Oeste before moving to Central Ítalo in the Venezuelan Segunda División. In 2010, Echeverría played briefly for Naval in the Primera B de Chile.

=== Player ===
- (Argentina) Ferro Carril Oeste 2004–2007
- (Venezuela) Centro Ítalo 2007–2008
- (Argentina) Ferro Carril Oeste (General Pico) 2009–2010
- (Chile) Naval 2010
- (Argentina) Sport Tres Algarrobos 2013
- (Argentina) FC Tres Algarrobos 2013–2015

=== Manager ===
- (Argentina) FC Tres Algarrobos 2017–2022
- (Argentina) Ingeniero White de Banderaló 2022–2023
- (Argentina) Sport Tres Algarrobos 2024–
