= Maximiliano Luayza =

Argentine footballer

Personal information
- Full name: Maximiliano Daniel Luayza Koot
- Date of birth: 15 April 2002 (age 24)
- Place of birth: San Vicente, Argentina
- Height: 1.70 m (5 ft 7 in)
- Position: Attacking midfielder

Team information
- Current team: Tristán Suárez

Youth career
- Deportivo San Vicente
- 2008–2017: Lanús
- 2017–2020: Defensa y Justicia

Senior career*
Years	Team	Apps	(Gls)
2020–2022	Defensa y Justicia	8	(0)
2022	Trasandino	8	(0)
2023–2025	Guillermo Brown	55	(3)
2025–2026	Almagro	23	(0)
2026–	Tristán Suárez	10	(1)
- * Club domestic league appearances and goals as of 17:18, 6 May 2026 (UTC)

Maximiliano Daniel Luayza Koot (born 15 April 2002) is an Argentine professional footballer who plays as an attacking midfielder for Tristán Suárez.

== Career ==
Luayza Koot spent the early years of his career with Deportivo San Vicente, before later moving on to the ranks of Lanús in 2008. In 2017, Defensa y Justicia signed him. He remained in their academy for three years, prior to his promotion into the first-team squad in 2020 under manager Hernán Crespo. After going unused on the substitute's bench for a Copa Libertadores win over Delfín and a Copa de la Liga Profesional defeat to Central Córdoba, Luayza Koot made his senior debut in the latter competition on 6 December 2020 during a 1–0 away loss to Independiente; after replacing Nicolás Leguizamón at the interval.

In July 2022 he moved to Chile and joined Trasandino in the Segunda División Profesional de Chile.

== Personal life ==
Luayza Koot's cousin, Nicolás, also came through the Defensa y Justicia youth system.

== Career statistics ==
As of 13 December 2020.

Appearances and goals by club, season and competition
Club	Season	League			Cup		League Cup		Continental		Other		Total	
Club	Season	Division	Apps	Goals	Apps	Goals	Apps	Goals	Apps	Goals	Apps	Goals	Apps	Goals
Defensa y Justicia	2020–21 (Note: Soccerway counts Copa de la Liga Profesional appearances as league appearances.)	Primera División	2	0	0	0	0	0	0	0	0	0	2	0
Career total			2	0	0	0	0	0	0	0	0	0	2	0
