= Ariel Mangiantini =

Argentine footballer

Ariel Mangiantini (born 5 October 1971 in Zárate, Buenos Aires) is a former Argentine footballer who played as a forward for clubs of Argentina, Chile, Mexico, Bolivia, Ecuador and Italy.

== Clubs ==
- Defensores Unidos 1992–1995
- Deportes Concepción 1995
- Saltillo 1996
- Lucchese 1996
- Defensores Unidos 1997
- Santiago Wanderers 1997
- General Lamadrid 1998
- Tristán Suárez 1999–2000
- Temperley 2000–2001
- Ferro Carril Oeste 2001–2002
- Deportivo Cuenca 2002
- Independiente Petrolero 2002
- Blooming 2003
- Ferro Carril Oeste 2003
- Real Potosí 2004
- Fénix 2005–2007
