= Ramón Bareiro =

Argentine footballer

Personal information
- Full name: Ramón Américo Bareiro
- Place of birth: Posadas, Misiones, Argentina
- Position: Forward

Senior career*
| Years | Team | Apps | (Gls) |
| 1966–1977 | Gimnasia LP | 21+ | (5+) |
| 1978–1979 | Santiago Morning | 42 | (9) |
- 8 de Diciembre
- * Club domestic league appearances and goals

Ramón Américo Bareiro (born in Posadas, Misiones) is an Argentine former footballer who played for Gimnasia y Esgrima de La Plata, Chilean club Santiago Morning, and Club 8 de Diciembre de María Auxiliadora in Paraguay.

== Teams ==
- (Argentina) Gimnasia y Esgrima de La Plata 1966–1977
- (Chile) Santiago Morning 1978–1979
- (Paraguay) 8 de Diciembre
