= Enzo Benítez =

Argentine footballer

Personal information
- Date of birth: 14 September 1995 (age 31)
- Place of birth: Lomas de Zamora, Argentina
- Height: 1.73 m (5 ft 8 in)
- Position: Midfielder

Team information
- Current team: Deportivo Baigorrita

Senior career*
Years	Team	Apps	(Gls)
2015–2019	Los Andes	5	(0)
2017	→ Jorge Newbery (loan)		
2020–	Deportivo Baigorrita		
- * Club domestic league appearances and goals

Enzo Benítez (born 14 September 1995) is an Argentine professional footballer who plays as a midfielder for Deportivo Baigorrita.

== Career ==
Benítez started out in the system of Los Andes. He was an unused substitute seven times in Primera B Nacional across the 2015 and 2016 seasons, prior to leaving the club on loan on 28 February 2017 to Jorge Newbery. Benítez returned to Los Andes later that year, subsequently making his professional bow in a 2–2 draw with Instituto on 7 July; another appearance followed against San Martín on 17 July. In July 2019, having departed Los Andes, Benítez joined Liga Deportiva del Oeste side Deportivo Baigorrita.

== Career statistics ==
As of 12 July 2020.

Appearances and goals by club, season and competition
Club	Season	League			Cup		Continental		Other		Total	
Club	Season	Division	Apps	Goals	Apps	Goals	Apps	Goals	Apps	Goals	Apps	Goals
Los Andes	2015	Primera B Nacional	0	0	0	0	—		0	0	0	0
Los Andes	2016	Primera B Nacional	0	0	0	0	—		0	0	0	0
Los Andes	2016–17	Primera B Nacional	2	0	0	0	—		0	0	2	0
Los Andes	2017–18	Primera B Nacional	0	0	0	0	—		0	0	0	0
Los Andes	2018–19	Primera B Nacional	3	0	0	0	—		0	0	3	0
Career total			5	0	0	0	—		0	0	5	0
