= Eduardo Iachetti =

Association footballer

Personal information
- Full name: Eduardo Luis Iachetti
- Date of birth: February 10, 1975 (age 51)
- Place of birth: Cipolletti, Argentina
- Height: 1.80 m (5 ft 11 in)
- Position: Striker

Senior career*
Years	Team	Apps	(Gls)
1996–1998	Cipolleti	58	(19)
1998–1999	Colón de Santa Fe	4	(0)
1999–2000	Juventud Antoniana	27	(9)
2001	Olimpo	19	(1)
2002	Deportivo Olmedo	15	(4)
2002–2003	San Martín de Mendoza	38	(17)
2003	Blooming	15	(5)
2004	Deportivo Cuenca	18	(2)
2004–2005	Blooming	29	(6)
2005	Unión de Santa Fe	14	(3)
2006	San Martín de Mendoza	7	(2)
- * Club domestic league appearances and goals

Eduardo Luis Iachetti (born February 10, 1975, in Cipolletti, Río Negro Province) is an Argentine former football striker.

In his native country he played for first division clubs Colón and San Martín de Mendoza. He also spent some years in the Argentine Nacional B playing for teams such as Olimpo de Bahía Blanca and Unión de Santa Fe. Moreover, he made spells in the Serie A de Ecuador for clubs Olmedo and Deportivo Cuenca, the second one for which he played in Copa Libertadores. In addition, he saw some action in the Liga de Fútbol Profesional Boliviano with two spells at Club Blooming. In 2006 while playing for San Martín de Mendoza on his second stint, Iachetti retired from football as result of a knee injury he could not recovered from.
