= Mauro Scatularo =

Argentine footballer

Mauro Darío Scatularo (born 26 January 1988) is an Argentine former professional footballer who played as a midfielder.

== Career ==
- (Chile) Deportes Puerto Montt 2010–2011
- (Argentina) UAI Urquiza 2012

Having played for Deportes Puerto Montt during the 2010 season, he was linked with a return to the club in August 2011.

He had two stints at Colegiales.
