= Adrián Bianchi =

Argentine footballer

Personal information
- Full name: Adrián Alberto Bianchi
- Date of birth: April 25, 1964 (age 62)
- Place of birth: Morón, Buenos Aires, Argentina
- Position: Forward

Youth career
- Vélez Sarsfield

Senior career*
Years	Team	Apps	(Gls)
1987–1989	Vélez Sarsfield	90	(19)
1989–1992	Ferro Carril Oeste	78	(9)
1992–1993	Platense	14	(3)
1993	Mineros de Guayana		
1994	Deportes Concepción	2	(0)
1994–1995	Deportivo Laferrere	3	(0)
1996	Rampla Juniors		

Managerial career
- 1999–2000: Deportivo Morón (assistant)
- 2012–2013: San Miguel (assistant)
- 2016–2023: Ferro Carril Oeste (youth)
- * Club domestic league appearances and goals

Adrián Alberto Bianchi (born April 25, 1964) is an Argentine former footballer who played for clubs in Argentina, Chile, Uruguay and Venezuela. He played as a forward.

== Teams ==
- (Argentina) Vélez Sársfield 1987–1989
- (Argentina) Ferro Carril Oeste 1989–1992
- (Argentina) Platense 1992–1993
- (Venezuela) Mineros de Guayana 1993
- (Chile) Deportes Concepción 1994
- (Argentina) Deportivo Laferrere 1994–1995
- (Uruguay) Rampla Juniors 1996

== Personal life ==
Also an author, Bianchi has written books such as Un avioncito de papel (A little paper aeroplane), Futbolistas Arriba (Footballers Come On!), Pelota de papel (Paper ball), Una nueva oportunidad (A new chance), among others.

Also a musician, Bianchi and Rocío Isólica made up a rock music duo called "Natural" since 2024. He mainly plays guitar.
