= Vicente Principiano =

Argentine footballer

Personal information
- Full name: Vicente Rubén Principiano
- Date of birth: 3 October 1978 (age 48)
- Place of birth: San Nicolás, Argentina
- Height: 1.70 m (5 ft 7 in)
- Position: Forward

Senior career*
Years	Team	Apps	(Gls)
1999–2004	Racing		
2001–2002	→ Colo-Colo (loan)		
2004	Atlético Universidad		
2005	Olmedo		
2005–2006	Mamelodi Sundowns		
2006–2007	Deportivo Morón		
2008	Monagas		
2008–2009	Matera		
2009–2010	Sporting Terni		
2010–2012	Defensores (VR)		
2006	Sacachispas		
- * Club domestic league appearances and goals

Vicente Rubén Principiano (born 3 October 1978) is an Argentine former professional footballer who played as a forward for clubs like Racing Club de Avellaneda or Chilean Colo-Colo. In this last team, he was member of the 2002 Torneo Apertura champion squad alongside his compatriots Nicolás Tagliani and Marcelo Espina.

== Honours ==
Racing Club

- Argentine Primera División: 2001 Clausura

Colo-Colo

- Chilean Primera División: 2002 Clausura
