= Esteban Figún =

Argentine footballer

Personal information
- Full name: Esteban Óscar Figún
- Date of birth: 1 November 1979 (age 47)
- Place of birth: San Martín, Buenos Aires, Argentina
- Position: Midfielder

Youth career
- 1996–1998: Tigre

Senior career*
Years	Team	Apps	(Gls)
1998–2000	Tigre	62	(7)
2000	West Ham United	0	(0)
2000	Pistoiese	0	(0)
2000–2001	Ferro Carril Oeste	13	(1)
2001–2002	Estudiantes	0	(0)
2002	Maracaibo	12	(0)
2003–2004	Provincial Osorno	15	(2)
2005	Deportes Temuco	8	(0)
2005	Arco Íris	–	(–)
2006–2009	Acassuso	71	(11)
2009–2010	Defensores Unidos	24	(2)
2010–2011	Ferrocarril Midland	11	(0)
2011–2012	Leandro N. Alem	22	(1)
Total		238	(24)
- * Club domestic league appearances and goals

Esteban Óscar Figún (born 1 November 1979) is an Argentine former footballer who played as a midfielder.

== Career ==
Figún made 57 appearances in the Primera B Nacional for Tigre and Ferro Carril Oeste, with brief stints with West Ham United and Pistoiese before Ferro Carril Oeste, and then "fulfilled his dream" by signing for Primera División club Estudiantes in 2001. He never featured for their first team, and went abroad to play for Maracaibo of Venezuela and for Chilean clubs Provincial Osorno and Deportes Temuco before returning to spend the remainder of his career in the lower divisions of Argentine football.
