= Walter Fonseca =

Argentine footballer

Personal information
- Full name: Walter David Fonseca
- Date of birth: 16 January 1980 (age 46)
- Place of birth: Santa Fe, Argentina
- Height: 1.83 m (6 ft 0 in)
- Position: Defender

Youth career
- Banfield

Senior career*
Years	Team	Apps	(Gls)
2000–2003	Banfield	32	(1)
2003–2004	Gimnasia CdU	18	(1)
2004	Alvarado	8	(0)
2005	Deportes Temuco	19	(1)
2005–2007	Estudiantes BA	43	(0)
2007–2008	El Porvenir	24	(0)
2008–2009	Cañuelas	35	(0)
2009–2010	Juventud de Pergamino	25	(0)
- * Club domestic league appearances and goals

Walter David Fonseca (born January 16, 1980, in Santa Fe, Argentina) is an Argentine former footballer who played as a midfielder.

== Teams ==
- (Argentina) Banfield 2000–2003
- (Argentina) Gimnasia y Esgrima de Concepción del Uruguay 2003–2004
- (Argentina) Alvarado de Mar del Plata 2004
- (Chile) Deportes Temuco 2005
- (Argentina) Estudiantes de Buenos Aires 2005–2007
- (Argentina) El Porvenir 2007–2008
- (Argentina) Cañuelas 2008–2009
- (Argentina) Juventud de Pergamino 2009–2010
