= Juan Pablo Cabaña =

Argentine footballer

Personal information
- Date of birth: 28 December 2001 (age 24)
- Place of birth: Córdoba, Argentina
- Height: 1.84 m (6 ft 0 in)
- Position: Forward

Team information
- Current team: Boca Juniors
- Number: 30

Youth career
- Boca Juniors

Senior career*
Years	Team	Apps	(Gls)
2021–	Boca Juniors	1	(0)
- * Club domestic league appearances and goals as of 23:04, 18 August 2021 (UTC)

Juan Pablo Cabaña (born 28 December 2001) is an Argentine footballer currently playing as a forward for Boca Juniors.

== Career statistics ==
=== Club ===
As of 18 August 2021.

Club	Season	League			Cup		Continental		Other		Total	
Club	Season	Division	Apps	Goals	Apps	Goals	Apps	Goals	Apps	Goals	Apps	Goals
Boca Juniors	2021	Argentine Primera División	1	0	0	0	0	0	0	0	1	0
Career total			1	0	0	0	0	0	0	0	1	0
