= Martín Bordonaro =

Argentine footballer (born 1988)

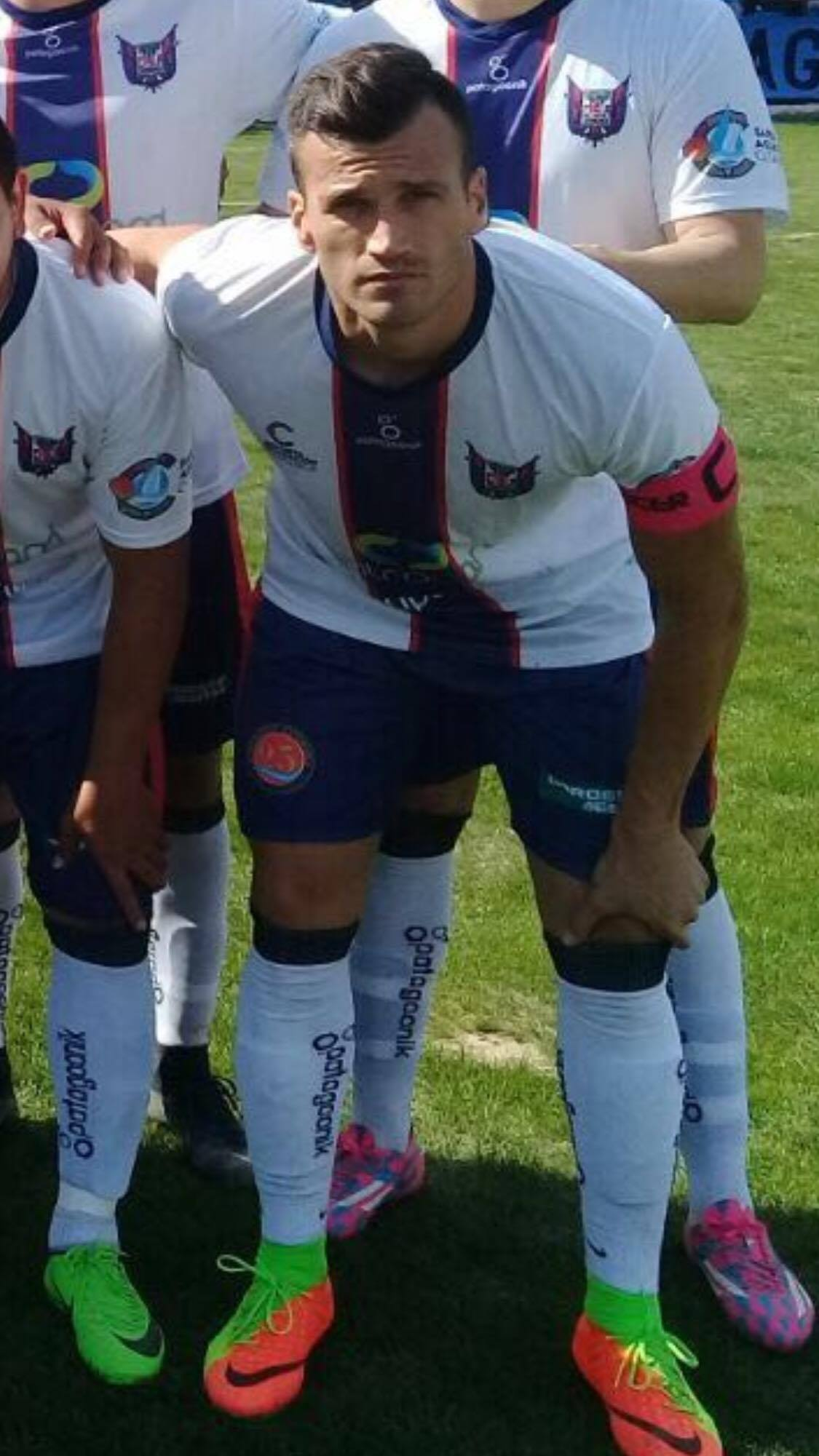
Martín Bordonaro

Alejandro Martín Bordonaro (born 20 April 1988 in Córdoba, Argentina) is an Argentine professional footballer who plays as a forward for Almagro.

== Clubs ==
- Universitario de Córdoba 1999–2002
- General Paz Juniors 2003–2006
- Cádiz B 2006–2007
- Banco de Córdoba 2008–2009
- José Gálvez 2010
- Central Norte 2011–2012
- San Lorenzo de Alem 2012–2014
- Villa San Carlos 2014
- Ferro Carril Oeste 2015
- Unión La Calera 2015
- Almagro 2016–2017
- San Lorenzo de Alem 2017–
