= Tomás Federico =

Argentine footballer

Personal information
- Date of birth: 18 May 1998 (age 28)
- Place of birth: Rafaela, Argentina
- Height: 1.78 m (5 ft 10 in)
- Position: Midfielder

Team information
- Current team: Güemes

Youth career
- San Martín

Senior career*
Years	Team	Apps	(Gls)
2019–2020	San Martín	4	(0)
2020	Avellino	0	(0)
2020	9 de Julio	11	(0)
2021	Unión de Sunchales	27	(1)
2022–2024	Sportivo Belgrano	75	(1)
2025–	Güemes	21	(2)
- * Club domestic league appearances and goals as of 16:59, 13 August 2025 (UTC)

Tomás Federico (born 18 May 1998) is an Argentine professional footballer who plays as a midfielder for Güemes.

== Career ==
Federico got his career underway with San Martín of the Primera División. He was put on the substitutes bench by caretaker manager Floreal García as they travelled to the Estadio Monumental Antonio Vespucio Liberti to face River Plate on 24 February 2019, with Federico later coming off the bench in place of Gonzalo Lamardo as San Martín lost 2–1.

On 28 January 2020, Federico was signed by Serie C club Avellino.

== Career statistics ==
As of 24 February 2019.

Appearances and goals by club, season and competition
Club	Season	League			Cup		Continental		Other		Total	
Club	Season	Division	Apps	Goals	Apps	Goals	Apps	Goals	Apps	Goals	Apps	Goals
San Martín	2018–19	Primera División	1	0	0	0	—		0	0	1	0
Career total			1	0	0	0	—		0	0	1	0
