= Jonathan Artura =

Argentine footballer

Personal information
- Full name: Jonathan David Artura
- Date of birth: 31 March 1987 (age 39)
- Place of birth: Córdoba, Argentina
- Height: 1.80 m (5 ft 11 in)
- Position: Midfielder

Youth career
- Talleres
- 2001–2007: Boca Juniors

Senior career*
Years	Team	Apps	(Gls)
2006–2008	Boca Juniors	0	(0)
2006	→ Universidad Católica (loan)	6	(1)
2007	→ Instituto (loan)	0	(0)
2007	→ Talleres (loan)	0	(0)
2009–2013	Racing de Córdoba	72	(7)
2011–2012	→ Desamparados (loan)	26	(2)
2013	Central Norte	7	(0)
2014	Lota Schwager	9	(0)
2015	Unión Villa Krause	1	(0)
2015–2016	Sportivo Peñarol	29	(2)
- * Club domestic league appearances and goals

Jonathan David Artura (born 31 March 1987) is an Argentine former footballer.

== Teams ==
- (Argentina) Boca Juniors 2006–2008
- (Ecuador) Universidad Católica (loan) 2006
- (Argentina) Instituto (loan) 2007
- (Argentina) Talleres (loan) 2007
- (Argentina) Racing de Córdoba 2009–2013
- (Argentina) Desamparados (loan) 2011–2012
- (Argentina) Central Norte 2013
- (Chile) Lota Schwager 2014
- (Argentina) Unión Villa Krause 2015
- (Argentina) Sportivo Peñarol 2015–2016
