= Ariel Macia =

Argentine footballer (born 1970)

Ariel Macia (born 22 October 1970) is an Argentine former professional footballer who played as a defender or midfielder for clubs of Argentina, Chile and Guatemala.

== Teams ==
- Atlanta 1990–1996
- Chacarita Juniors 1996–1997
- Instituto 1997–1998
- Independiente Rivadavia 1998–2000
- Palestino 2001–2002
- Comunicaciones 2002–2004
- Palestino 2004
- Deportivo Marquense 2005
- Deportivo Jalapa 2006
- Deportivo Merlo 2006

== Honours ==
Comunicaciones

- Torneos Apertura y Clausura: 2002–03
