= Diego Pave =

Argentine footballer (born 1985)

Diego Daniel Pave (born 29 April 1985 in Concarán, San Luis Province) is an Argentine footballer that plays in the position of Goalkeeper. His current club is San Martín de Tucumán team in the third tier of Argentine football.

Pave began his career with Club Atlético Boca Juniors.

== Clubes ==
Club	From	Years
Boca Juniors	Argentina	2005–2006
Tiro Federal	Argentina	2006–2007
Real Arroyo Seco	Argentina	2007–2008
Almagro	Argentina	2008–2011
San Martín de Tucumán	Argentina	2013- 2014
