= Maximiliano Cabaña =

Argentine footballer

Personal information
- Full name: Maximiliano Ezequiel Cabaña
- Date of birth: 4 March 1999 (age 27)
- Place of birth: Ituzaingó, Corrientes, Argentina
- Height: 1.66 m (5 ft 5 in)
- Position: Midfielder

Team information
- Current team: OTP
- Number: 28

Youth career
- –2018: CSD San Jorge

Senior career*
Years	Team	Apps	(Gls)
2018–2022	CSD San Jorge	0	(0)
2018	→ Kristianstad (loan)	21	(5)
2019–2020	→ Viktoria Žižkov (loan)	3	(0)
2022-	OTP	0	(0)
- * Club domestic league appearances and goals as of 17:04, 16 April 2022 (UTC)

Maximiliano Ezequiel Cabaña (born 4 March 1999) is an Argentine footballer currently playing as a midfielder for OTP.

== Career statistics ==
=== Club ===
As of 7 December 2019.

Club	Season	League			Cup		Other		Total	
Club	Season	Division	Apps	Goals	Apps	Goals	Apps	Goals	Apps	Goals
Kristianstad (loan)	2018	Ettan	21	5	1 (Note: Appearances in the Svenska Cupen)	0	0	0	22	5
Viktoria Žižkov	2019–20	Fortuna národní liga	3	0	0	0	0	0	3	0
Career total			24	5	1	0	0	0	25	5
