= Marcelo Vidal =

Argentine footballer

Personal information
- Full name: Marcelo Leonel Vidal
- Date of birth: January 15, 1991 (age 35)
- Place of birth: Argentina
- Height: 1.77 m (5 ft 9 1/2 in)
- Position: Midfielder

Team information
- Current team: Bogotá

Senior career*
Years	Team	Apps	(Gls)
2010–2016	Independiente	30	(6)
2010–2011	→ Deportivo Merlo (loan)	1	(0)
2015	→ Olimpo (loan)	3	(0)
2016–2017	Blooming	11	(0)
2017	Renofa Yamaguchi	2	(0)
2018	Union Magdalena	5	(0)
2019–	Bogotá	5	(0)
- * Club domestic league appearances and goals as of 23:52, 25 May 2019 (UTC)

Marcelo Vidal (born January 15, 1991) is an Argentine football player who currently plays for Bogotá FC.

== Career ==
Marcelo Vidal joined J2 League club Renofa Yamaguchi FC in 2017.
