= Claus Gold Betig =

Argentine footballer

Personal information
- Full name: Claus Gabriel Gold Betig
- Date of birth: 27 August 1990 (age 36)
- Place of birth: Misiones, Argentina
- Position: Defender

Senior career*
Years	Team	Apps	(Gls)
2007–2009	Unión de Santa Fe	9	(0)
2010	Argentinos Juniors	0	(0)
2012–2013	Guillermo Brown	12	(0)
2013–2015	Juventud de Pergamino	42	(1)
2015	Bragado Club	20	(3)
2016	Juventud de Pergamino	0	(0)
2016	Colonial de Ferré	17	(0)
Total		100	(3)
- * Club domestic league appearances and goals

Claus Gabriel Gold Betig (born 27 August 1990) is an Argentine former footballer.

Gold Betig is notorious for an incident that occurred after he signed a professional contract with Unión de Santa Fe. He was seen wearing Club Atlético Colón (Unión's bitter city rival) clothing in a local shop, and the club's leadership questioned his loyalty. After suffering abuse from Unión's supporters, he requested and was granted a termination of his contract.
