= Rubén Bruno =

Argentine footballer

Personal information
- Full name: Rubén Norberto Bruno
- Date of birth: August 9, 1963 (age 63)
- Place of birth: Buenos Aires, Argentina
- Position: Forward

Senior career*
Years	Team	Apps	(Gls)
1975-1977	River Plate	11	(2)
1977-1978	Los Andes	10	(0)
1978-1980	Huachipato		
1980-1981	Unión de Zapata		
1981-1982	Independiente de Neuquén		
- * Club domestic league appearances and goals

Rubén Norberto Bruno (born August 9, 1963, in Buenos Aires, Argentina) is an Argentine former footballer who played as a forward for clubs of Argentina and Chile.

== Teams ==
- River Plate 1975–1977
- Los Andes 1977–1978
- Huachipato 1978–1980
- Unión de Zapata 1980–1981
- Independiente de Neuquén 1981–1982

== Titles ==
- (Argentina) River Plate 1975 (Argentine Championship)
