= Miguel Ángel Villamonte =

Argentine footballer

Personal information
- Date of birth: 12 October 1967 (age 59)
- Place of birth: Buenos Aires, Argentina
- Position: Midfielder

Senior career*
Years	Team	Apps	(Gls)
1986–1987	Velez Sarsfield		
1988–1990	Cobreloa		
1990–1991	All Boys		
1992–1993	Atlanta		
1993–1994	Club Leon		

International career
1982–1983	Argentina youth		
- * Club domestic league appearances and goals

Miguel Angel Villamonte (born 12 October 1967) is an Argentine former professional footballer who played as a midfielder for clubs of Argentina and Chile.

== Honours ==
Cobreloa

- Chilean Championship 1988

Argentina youth

- Torneo Cruz del Sur: 1982
