= Javier Sequeyra =

Argentine footballer

Personal information
- Full name: Javier Marcelo Sequeyra
- Date of birth: 23 July 1995 (age 31)
- Place of birth: Berisso, Argentina
- Position: Midfielder

Team information
- Current team: Defensores de Cambaceres

Youth career
- 2012: Estudiantes

Senior career*
Years	Team	Apps	(Gls)
2012–2016	Estudiantes	2	(0)
2014–2016	→ Villa San Carlos (loan)	36	(1)
2018–2019	Plaza Colonia	31	(0)
2020–2021	Huracán Las Heras		(0)
2021–2022	Villa San Carlos		(0)
2022–2024	Club Ciudad de Bolívar	62	(2)
2025–	Defensores de Cambaceres		
2025	→ Crucero del Norte (loan)	7	(0)
- * Club domestic league appearances and goals as of 22:04, 7 January 2026 (UTC)

Javier Marcelo Sequeyra (born 23 July 1995 in Berisso) is an Argentine footballer currently playing for Defensores de Cambaceres in the Primera C, the regionalised fourth division of the Argentine football league system.

== Career ==
Sequeyra is born in Berisso. He made his debut in the 2012/13 season. He played two games that season.

He also played in Club Ciudad de Bolívar and Defensores de Cambaceres, In July 2025 he became a reinforcement for Crucero del Norte on loan, and in 2026 he returned to Defensores de Cambaceres.
