= Pablo Gozzarelli =

Argentine footballer

Personal information
- Full name: Pablo Gozzarelli
- Date of birth: 3 December 1985 (age 40)
- Place of birth: Santa Fe, Argentina
- Height: 1.91 m (6 ft 3 in)
- Position: Striker

Youth career
- Santa Fe FC

Senior career*
Years	Team	Apps	(Gls)
–2007	Santa Fe FC	–	(–)
2007–2008	Temperley	16	(1)
2009	San Marcos	14	(1)
2010	Santa Fe FC	–	(–)
2010–2011	Estudiantes BA	16	(1)
2011	LDU Portoviejo		(4)
2014–2015	Sarmiento de Humboldt	–	(–)
2016–2019	San Martín Progreso	–	(–)
2020	Sarmiento de Humboldt	–	(–)
- * Club domestic league appearances and goals

Pablo Gozzarelli (born December 3, 1985, in Santa Fe, Argentina) is an Argentine former footballer who played as a striker.

== Teams ==
- (Argentina) Santa Fe FC –2007
- (Argentina) Temperley 2007–2008
- (Argentina) Estudiantes de Buenos Aires 2008
- (Chile) San Marcos de Arica 2009
- (Argentina) Santa Fe FC 2010
- (Ecuador) LDU Portoviejo 2011
- (Argentina) Sarmiento de Humboldt 2014–2015
- (Argentina) San Martín de Progreso 2016–2019
- (Argentina) Sarmiento de Humboldt 2020
