= Renzo Spinaci =

Argentine footballer

Personal information
- Date of birth: 8 March 1993 (age 33)
- Place of birth: Junín, Argentina
- Height: 1.79 m (5 ft 10 in)
- Position: Midfielder

Team information
- Current team: Los Andes

Youth career
- 1997–2013: Sarmiento

Senior career*
| Years | Team | Apps | (Gls) |
| 2013–2018 | Sarmiento | 58 | (1) |
| 2017 | → Tigre (loan) | 9 | (0) |
| 2018–2019 | Villa Dálmine | 12 | (0) |
| 2019– | Los Andes | 8 | (0) |
- * Club domestic league appearances and goals as of 22:25, 21 December 2019 (UTC)

Renzo Spinaci (born 8 March 1993) is an Argentine professional footballer who plays as a midfielder for Club Atlético Los Andes.

== Career ==
Spinaci began with Sarmiento; signing in 1997. His bow in Primera B Nacional came during a 2–2 draw with Defensa y Justicia on 28 May 2013, four months after he made his senior bow in the Copa Argentina against Almirante Brown. Nineteen further appearances in all competitions subsequently arrived in two seasons, with the latter concluding with promotion to the Primera División. He featured sixteen times in the top-flight, twelve of which were starts, as they placed twenty-fourth. Spinaci scored his first goal at the Estadio Roberto Natalio Carminatti in stoppage time on 21 May 2016 as Sarmiento beat Olimpo, which saved them from relegation.

However, Sarmiento were relegated in the subsequent 2016–17 season - which was followed by Spinaci being loaned to Primera División team Tigre in August 2017. Nine appearances occurred in the first part of 2017–18; though the midfielder spending the rest of the campaign back with Sarmiento in Primera B Nacional. June 2018 saw Spinaci agree to join Villa Dálmine.

== Career statistics ==
As of 1 April 2019.

Appearances and goals by club, season and competition
| Club | Season | League | | | Cup | | Continental | | Other | | Total | |
| Club | Season | Division | Apps | Goals | Apps | Goals | Apps | Goals | Apps | Goals | Apps | Goals |
|---|---|---|---|---|---|---|---|---|---|---|---|---|
| Sarmiento | 2012–13 | Primera B Nacional | 1 | 0 | 1 | 0 | — | | 0 | 0 | 2 | 0 |
| Sarmiento | 2013–14 | Primera B Nacional | 2 | 0 | 1 | 0 | — | | 0 | 0 | 3 | 0 |
| Sarmiento | 2014 | Primera B Nacional | 16 | 0 | 0 | 0 | — | | 0 | 0 | 16 | 0 |
| Sarmiento | 2015 | Primera División | 16 | 0 | 0 | 0 | — | | 0 | 0 | 16 | 0 |
| Sarmiento | 2016 | Primera División | 7 | 1 | 0 | 0 | — | | 0 | 0 | 7 | 1 |
| Sarmiento | 2016–17 | Primera División | 13 | 0 | 1 | 0 | — | | 0 | 0 | 14 | 0 |
| Sarmiento | 2017–18 | Primera B Nacional | 3 | 0 | 0 | 0 | — | | 3 (Note: Appearance(s) in the Primera B Nacional play-offs) | 0 | 6 | 0 |
| Sarmiento | Total | | 58 | 1 | 3 | 0 | — | | 3 | 0 | 64 | 1 |
| Tigre (loan) | 2017–18 | Primera División | 9 | 0 | 0 | 0 | — | | 0 | 0 | 9 | 0 |
| Villa Dálmine | 2018–19 | Primera B Nacional | 11 | 0 | 3 | 0 | — | | 0 | 0 | 14 | 0 |
| Career total | | | 78 | 1 | 6 | 0 | — | | 3 | 0 | 87 | 1 |
