= Juan Manuel Navarrete =

Argentine footballer

Personal information
- Full name: Juan Manuel Navarrete
- Date of birth: February 20, 1988 (age 38)
- Place of birth: Sastre, Santa Fe, Argentina
- Height: 1.79 m (5 ft 10 1/2 in)
- Positions: Right midfielder; right wing

Team information
- Current team: Club Atlético San Jorge

Youth career
- Atlético de Rafaela

Senior career*
Years	Team	Apps	(Gls)
2009–2012	Atlético de Rafaela		
2012–2013	9 de Julio		
2013–	Club Atlético San Jorge		
- * Club domestic league appearances and goals as of 11 August 2011

Juan Manuel Navarrete (born 20 February 1988) is an Argentine football midfielder who plays for amateur club Club Atlético San Jorge in Argentina. He played one match in the Primera B Nacional during the 2008/09 season.
