= Gabriel Gandarillas =

Argentine footballer

Gabriel Gandarillas (born 18 August 1975) is an Argentine former professional footballer who played as a midfielder.

== Career ==
- Argentino de Quilmes 1996–2000
- San Telmo 2000–2003
- Tristán Suárez 2003–2005
- San Telmo 2005–2008
- Almirante Brown 2008–2010
- Los Andes 2011
- Deportes Concepción 2012–2013
- Sacachispas 2013–2014

== Honours ==
Almirante Brown

- Primera B Metropolitana 2007–08
