= Luis Bevacqua =

Argentine footballer

Personal information
- Full name: Luis Martín Bevacqua
- Date of birth: 12 June 1989 (age 37)
- Place of birth: Lanús, Argentina
- Height: 1.69 m (5 ft 7 in)
- Position: Midfielder

Youth career
- Argentinos Juniors
- 2004–2010: Los Andes

Senior career*
Years	Team	Apps	(Gls)
2010–2014	Los Andes	85	(3)
2014	Palestino	4	(0)
2015	Curicó Unido	8	(0)
2015–2016	Deportes Copiapó	27	(3)
2016	Chieri	–	(–)
2016–2019	Barracas Central	65	(4)
- * Club domestic league appearances and goals

Luis Martín Bevacqua (born 12 June 1989) is an Argentine former footballer who played as a midfielder.

== Teams ==
- (Argentina) Los Andes 2010–2014
- (Chile) Palestino 2014
- (Chile) Curicó Unido 2015
- (Chile) Deportes Copiapó 2015–2016
- (Italy) Chieri 2016
- (Argentina) Barracas Central 2016–2019

== Personal life ==
His paternal grandparents are from Longobucco, Cosenza, Italy. Bevacqua holds Italian passport.
