= Oscar Baquela =

Argentine footballer (born 1957)

Personal information
- Full name: Oscar Haroldo Baquela
- Date of birth: October 20, 1957 (age 69)
- Place of birth: San Nicolás de los Arroyos, Buenos Aires, Argentina
- Position: Midfielder

Youth career
- Lucini de Pergamino

Senior career*
Years	Team	Apps	(Gls)
1975–1979	Independiente		
1981–1982	Unión Española	23	(4)
- Argentinos Juniors
- * Club domestic league appearances and goals

Oscar Haroldo Baquela (born October 20, 1957, in San Nicolás de los Arroyos, Buenos Aires, Argentina) is an Argentine former footballer who played for Independiente and Unión Española.

== Teams ==
- (Argentina) Lucini de Pergamino (youth)
- (Argentina) Independiente 1975–1979
- (Chile) Unión Española 1981–1982
- (Argentina) Argentinos Juniors

== Titles ==
- Independiente 1977 and 1978 (Argentine Championship)
