= Marcos Quiroga (footballer, born 1988) =

Argentine footballer

Marcos Esteban Quiroga (born June 16, 1988, in San Juan, Argentina) is an Argentine footballer currently playing for Naval of the Primera División B in Chile.

== Teams ==
- (Argentina) Sportivo Desamparados 2007–2008
- (Argentina) San Martín de San Juan 2008–2009
- (Argentina) Sportivo Desamparados 2009–2010
- (Argentina) Gimnasia y Esgrima de Mendoza 2010–2011
- (Chile) Naval 2011–present
