= Marcos Sartor =

Argentine footballer (born 1995)

Marcos Luciano Sartor Camiña (born 18 March 1995) is an Argentinian footballer who plays as a forward. Camiña began his career at Nahuel Niyeo's youth team in Ingeniero Jacobacci and has since played consecutively for the football clubs Peña Azul y Oro Viedma, Atlético de Rafaela, U.C. Sampdoria in Italy and Fútbol Alcobendas Sport.
