= Nicolás López Macri =

Argentine football player

Personal information
- Full name: Nicolás Manuel López Macri
- Date of birth: 2 March 1990 (age 36)
- Place of birth: Rosario, Argentina
- Position: Forward

Youth career
- Estudiantes LP

Senior career*
| Years | Team | Apps | (Gls) |
| 2011–2014 | Instituto | 64 | (1) |
| 2013 | → Santiago Wanderers (loan) | 28 | (3) |
| 2014 | Aldosivi | 17 | (0) |
| 2015–2016 | Sportivo Belgrano | 29 | (1) |
| 2016–2017 | Ferro Carril Oeste | 9 | (0) |
| 2017–2018 | Gimnasia y Tiro | 24 | (4) |
| 2018–2019 | Juventud Unida Universitario | 16 | (0) |
| 2019–2020 | Olimpo | 20 | (2) |
| 2020–2022 | Sportivo Belgrano | 40 | (1) |
- * Club domestic league appearances and goals

Nicolás Manuel López Macri (born 2 March 1990 in Rosario (Santa Fe), Argentina) is an Argentine former footballer who played as a forward.

== Teams ==
- (Argentina) Instituto de Córdoba 2011–2014
- (Chile) Santiago Wanderers (loan) 2013
- (Argentina) Aldosivi 2014
- (Argentina) Sportivo Belgrano 2015–2016
- (Argentina) Ferro Carril Oeste 2016–2017
- (Argentina) Gimnasia y Tiro 2017–2018
- (Argentina) Juventud Unida Universitario 2018–2019
- (Argentina) Olimpo 2019–2020
- (Argentina) Sportivo Belgrano 2020–2022

== Style of play ==
He is 177 cm in height and weighs 70 kg. Right winger is his main position.
