= 2019–20 Instituto Atlético Central Córdoba season =

Association football season

Instituto
2019–20 season
- President: Gastón Defagot (until 26 August 2019); Roberto Castoldi (from 26 August 2019)
- Manager: César Zabala
- Stadium: Estadio Presidente Perón
- Top goalscorer: League: Mateo Bajamich (1); Martín Pino; All: Mateo Bajamich (1); Martín Pino

The 2019–20 season is Instituto's 15th consecutive season in the second division of Argentine football, Primera B Nacional.

The season generally covers the period from 1 July 2019 to 30 June 2020.

== Review ==
=== Pre-season ===
On 10 May 2019, Mateo Klimowicz agreed a move to German side Stuttgart; penning a five-year deal. On 22 May, Instituto announced their first off-season signing in goalkeeper Germán Salort from Agropecuario. Another notable departure was confirmed on 5 June, as centre-forward Pablo Vegetti, their top goalscorer in 2018–19, joined Belgrano. A double signing was revealed on 11 June, as Maximiliano López and José Villegas signed from lower league pair Villa Mitre and Sansinena. Also on that day, Leandro Vella left for Primera División team Godoy Cruz. Midfielder Damián Arce came through the door on 19 June from Almagro. Numerous loans from the past campaign officially expired on and around 30 June. Hours after, Instituto communicated the incoming of Facundo Silva.

Argentine-Chilean centre-forward Germán Estigarribia joined on 3 July, having most recently spent time with Deportes Antofagasta in Chile. Back-to-back meetings with Talleres kicked off Instituto's pre-season, though neither ended with victory; the initial encounter, a loss, was abandoned by the referee due to the aggressive nature of the match. Three days later, Instituto lost a friendly to Torneo Regional Federal Amateur outfit Atenas; in a fixture which celebrated their opponents' 103rd year of existence. Facundo Erpen penned a contract from San Martín on 11 July. Instituto drew in two friendlies with Central Córdoba on 16 July. They then fell to a draw and a defeat to Belgrano in exhibition games on 20 July. Sebastián Navarro headed to second tier All Boys on 23 July.

Instituto travelled to the Estadio Bautista Gargantini to face Independiente Rivadavia in friendlies on 27 July, playing out a 1–1 tie before losing 1–0. The same overall outcomes occurred on 3 August when Instituto met Sportivo Belgrano, which took their winless pre-season streak to eleven matches. On 5 August, Sarmiento publicised the arrival of Facundo Castelli. Instituto concluded their exhibition preparations with consecutive defeats at home to Güemes on 9 August. 12 August saw Facundo Affranchino depart to Villa Dálmine. On 15 August, Francisco Apaolaza became Instituto's eighth new addition.

=== August ===
Instituto's bad form continued into their opening day fixture in Primera B Nacional, as Villa Dálmine scored in either half to secure a 2–0 victory on 17 August. New signing German Estigarribia was unable to feature competitively for Instituto in early August, due to a dispute with his former club Deportes Antofagasta regarding the player's contractual status. Sarmiento ran out winners in a five-goal league match against Instituto to 22 August. Roberto Castoldi replaced Gastón Defagot as president on 26 August. Estigarribia's paperwork was fully completed on 30 August.

=== September ===
Instituto avoided defeat in competitive action for the first time on 2 September, as they and Deportivo Riestra cancelled each other out at the Estadio Guillermo Laza; in a fixture that saw Juan Ignacio Sills debut, despite no official club announcement of his arrival.

== Squad ==
Squad No.	Nationality	Name	Position(s)	Date of Birth (age)	Signed from
Goalkeepers
	Argentina	Julio Chiarini	GK	4 March 1982 (age 44)	Tigre
	Argentina	Leandro De Bortoli	GK	3 August 1988 (age 38)	Temperley
	Argentina	Fabricio Henricot	GK	26 April 1990 (age 36)	Boca Unidos
	Argentina	Brian Olivera	GK	13 December 1993 (age 32)	Academy
	Argentina	Lautaro Petruchi	GK	1 September 1998 (age 28)	Academy
	Argentina	Germán Salort	GK	14 October 1988 (age 38)	Agropecuario
Defenders
	Argentina	Facundo Agüero	CB	21 January 1995 (age 31)	Academy
	Argentina	Alan Aguirre	RB	13 August 1993 (age 33)	Sarmiento
	Argentina	Juan Cruz Argüello	RB	19 April 2000 (age 26)	Academy
	Argentina	Franco Canever	LB	17 September 1989 (age 37)	Aldosivi
	Argentina	Franco Coria	CB	8 July 1988 (age 38)	Cipolletti
	Argentina	Facundo Erpen	CB	19 May 1983 (age 43)	San Martín
	Argentina	Franco Flores	RB	9 July 1987 (age 39)	Villa Dálmine
	Argentina	Pablo Mattalia	DF	10 February 1995 (age 31)	Gimnasia y Esgrima
	Argentina	Alexis Rodríguez	DF	17 April 1998 (age 28)	Academy
	Argentina	Juan Ignacio Sills	CB	4 May 1987 (age 39)	Huracán
	Argentina	José Villegas	DF	17 April 1996 (age 30)	Sansinena
	Argentina	Gastón Yabale	CB	30 September 1994 (age 32)	Deportivo Lasallano
Midfielders
	Argentina	Ignacio Antonio	CM	4 January 1995 (age 31)	Academy
	Argentina	Damián Arce	LM	6 July 1991 (age 35)	Almagro
	Argentina	Tobias Ballari	CM	28 April 1995 (age 31)	Academy
	Argentina	Malcom Braida	RW	17 May 1997 (age 29)	Academy
	Argentina	Emiliano Endrizzi	LM	7 March 1994 (age 32)	Academy
	Argentina	Rodrigo Garro	AM	4 January 1998 (age 28)	Academy
	Argentina	Maximiliano López	MF	11 March 1993 (age 33)	Villa Mitre
	Argentina	Francisco Musso	MF	7 August 1999 (age 27)	Academy
	Argentina	Facundo Silva	AM	19 January 1991 (age 35)	Los Andes
	Argentina	Nicolás Watson	MF	22 May 1998 (age 28)	Academy
Forwards
	Argentina	Francisco Apaolaza	CF	19 June 1997 (age 29)	Estudiantes (LP) (loan)
	Argentina	Mateo Bajamich	FW	3 August 1999 (age 27)	Academy
	Argentina Chile	Germán Estigarribia	CF	6 March 1997 (age 29)	Deportes Antofagasta
	Argentina	Martín Pino	CF	16 March 1998 (age 28)	Academy
Out on loan					Loaned to
	Argentina	Facundo Castelli	CF	18 February 1995 (age 31)	Sarmiento

== Transfers ==
Domestic transfer windows:
3 July 2019 to 24 September 2019
20 January 2020 to 19 February 2020.

=== Transfers in ===
Date from	Position	Nationality	Name	From	Ref.
3 July 2019 (Note: Deal agreed on 22 May 2019)	GK	Argentina	Germán Salort	Agropecuario	
3 July 2019 (Note: Deal agreed on 11 June 2019)	MF	Argentina	Maximiliano López	Villa Mitre	
3 July 2019 (Note: Deal agreed on 11 June 2019)	DF	Argentina	José Villegas	Sansinena	
3 July 2019 (Note: Deal agreed on 19 June 2019)	LM	Argentina	Damián Arce	Almagro	
3 July 2019 (Note: Deal agreed on 30 June 2019)	AM	Argentina	Facundo Silva	Los Andes	
3 July 2019 (Note: Deal agreed on 2 July 2019)	CF	Argentina Chile	Germán Estigarribia	Deportes Antofagasta	
11 July 2019	CB	Argentina	Facundo Erpen	San Martín	
12 August 2019	CB	Argentina	Juan Ignacio Sills	Huracán	

=== Transfers out ===
Date from	Position	Nationality	Name	To	Ref.
3 July 2019 (Note: Deal agreed on 10 May 2019)	AM	Argentina	Mateo Klimowicz	VfB Stuttgart	
3 July 2019 (Note: Deal agreed on 5 June 2019)	CF	Argentina	Pablo Vegetti	Belgrano	
3 July 2019 (Note: Deal agreed on 11 June 2019)	RW	Argentina	Leandro Vella	Godoy Cruz	
3 July 2019 (Note: Deal agreed on 26 June 2019)	AM	Argentina	Emiliano Ellacopulos	Temperley	
23 July 2019	CM	Argentina	Sebastián Navarro	All Boys	
12 August 2019	RM	Argentina	Facundo Affranchino	Villa Dálmine	

=== Loans in ===
Start date	Position	Nationality	Name	From	End date	Ref.
15 August 2019	CF	Argentina	Francisco Apaolaza	Estudiantes (LP)	30 June 2020	

=== Loans out ===
Start date	Position	Nationality	Name	To	End date	Ref.
5 August 2019	CF	Argentina	Facundo Castelli	Sarmiento	30 June 2020	

== Friendlies ==
=== Pre-season ===
Friendlies with city rivals Talleres was scheduled in June for 6 July. Fixtures with Central Córdoba and Atenas were set on 4 July, with the latter celebrating Atenas' 103rd year of existence. Instituto would also travel to face Belgrano and Independiente Rivadavia in pre-season. In August, Instituto would face Sportivo Belgrano and Güemes.

Win Draw Loss

6 July 2019 Friendly	Talleres	1–0	Instituto	Córdoba, Argentina
10:00 GMT-3	T. Pochettino	Instituto; Vía País; Abandoned at 1–0		Stadium: Estadio Mario Alberto Kempes

6 July 2019 Friendly	Talleres	0–0	Instituto	Córdoba, Argentina
		Instituto; Vía País		Stadium: Estadio Mario Alberto Kempes

9 July 2019 Friendly	Atenas	2–1	Instituto	Río Cuarto, Argentina
20:30 GMT-3	P. Molina; F. Dho	Instituto; Mundo D - La Voz	M. Pino	Stadium: Estadio 9 de Julio

16 July 2019 Friendly	Instituto	1–1	Central Córdoba	Córdoba, Argentina
10:15 GMT-3	M. Bajamich	Instituto; Vía País; 60 min. match	J. Galeano	Stadium: Estadio Presidente Perón

16 July 2019 Friendly	Instituto	1–1	Central Córdoba	Córdoba, Argentina
	M. Barzola	Instituto; Vía País; 60 min. match	M. Pato	Stadium: Estadio Presidente Perón

20 July 2019 Friendly	Belgrano	3–1	Instituto	Córdoba, Argentina
09:30 GMT-3	P. Vegetti; M. Rivero	Instituto; Vía País	F. Silva	Stadium: Predio Armando Pérez

20 July 2019 Friendly	Belgrano	1–1	Instituto	Córdoba, Argentina
	G. Lencina	Instituto; Vía País	F. Agüero	Stadium: Predio Armando Pérez

27 July 2019 Friendly	Independiente Rivadavia	1–1	Instituto	Mendoza, Argentina
14:30 GMT-3	J. M. Romero	Instituto; Los Andes	F. Silva (pen.)	Stadium: Estadio Bautista Gargantini; Referee: Nicolás Canizzo (Argentina)

27 July 2019 Friendly	Independiente Rivadavia	1–0	Instituto	Mendoza, Argentina
16:00 GMT-3	M. Viguet	Instituto; Los Andes		Stadium: Estadio Bautista Gargantini

3 August 2019 Friendly	Instituto	1–1	Sportivo Belgrano	Córdoba, Argentina
10:00 GMT-3	D. Arce	Instituto; La Voz del Interior	E. Endrizzi (o.g.)	Stadium: Estadio Presidente Perón

3 August 2019 Friendly	Instituto	2–3	Sportivo Belgrano	Córdoba, Argentina
12:00 GMT-3	M. Pino	Instituto; La Voz del Interior	L. Pruneda; E. Avaro; E. Bertero	Stadium: Estadio Presidente Perón

9 August 2019 Friendly	Instituto	0–1	Güemes	Córdoba, Argentina
10:00 GMT-3		Instituto	D. Baudilio	Stadium: Predio La Agustina

9 August 2019 Friendly	Instituto	2–3	Güemes	Córdoba, Argentina
21:00 GMT-3	M. Braida; M. Pino	Instituto; Cadena 3	C. Vega; C. Montiglio	Stadium: Estadio Presidente Perón

== Competitions ==
=== Primera B Nacional ===
==== Results summary ====
Overall								Home						Away					
Pld	W	D	L	GF	GA	GD	Pts	W	D	L	GF	GA	GD	W	D	L	GF	GA	GD
3	0	1	2	2	5	−3	1	0	0	1	2	3	−1	0	1	1	0	2	−2

Last updated: 3 September 2019.
Source: Soccerway

==== Matches ====
The fixtures for the 2019–20 league season were announced on 1 August 2019, with a new format of split zones being introduced. Instituto were drawn in Zone B.

Win Draw Loss

17 August 2019 1	Villa Dálmine	2–0	Instituto	Campana, Argentina
15:30 GMT-3	C. Sánchez 21'; M. Arturia 77'	Instituto; La Voz del Interior; Soccerway		Stadium: Estadio El Coliseo de Mitre y Puccini; Referee: Yael Falcón (Argentina)

22 August 2019 2	Instituto	2–3	Sarmiento	Córdoba, Argentina
19:15 GMT-3	M. Bajamich 3'; M. Pino 30'	Instituto; La Voz del Interior; Soccerway	C. Pombo 2'; P. Magnín 28' (pen.), 42'	Stadium: Estadio Presidente Perón; Referee: Adrián Franklin (Argentina)

2 September 2019 3	Deportivo Riestra	0–0	Instituto	Buenos Aires, Argentina
15:30 GMT-3		Instituto; Vía País; Soccerway		Stadium: Estadio Guillermo Laza; Referee: Pablo Giménez (Argentina)

7 September 2019 4	Instituto	–	Chacarita Juniors	Córdoba, Argentina
20:05 GMT-3				Stadium: Estadio Presidente Perón

== Squad statistics ==
=== Appearances and goals ===
No.	Pos.	Nationality	Name	League		Cup		League Cup		Continental		Other		Total		Discipline		Ref
No.	Pos.	Nationality	Name	Apps	Goals	Apps	Goals	Apps	Goals	Apps	Goals	Apps	Goals	Apps	Goals	Yellow card	Red card	Ref
–	GK	Argentina	Julio Chiarini	0	0	—		—		—		0	0	0	0	0	0	
–	GK	Argentina	Leandro De Bortoli	0	0	—		—		—		0	0	0	0	0	0	
–	GK	Argentina	Fabricio Henricot	0	0	—		—		—		0	0	0	0	0	0	
–	GK	Argentina	Brian Olivera	0	0	—		—		—		0	0	0	0	0	0	
–	GK	Argentina	Lautaro Petruchi	0	0	—		—		—		0	0	0	0	0	0	
–	GK	Argentina	Germán Salort	3	0	—		—		—		0	0	3	0	0	0	
–	CB	Argentina	Facundo Agüero	3	0	—		—		—		0	0	3	0	0	0	
–	RB	Argentina	Alan Aguirre	0	0	—		—		—		0	0	0	0	0	0	
–	RB	Argentina	Juan Cruz Argüello	0	0	—		—		—		0	0	0	0	0	0	
–	LB	Argentina	Franco Canever	2(1)	0	—		—		—		0	0	2(1)	0	1	0	
–	CB	Argentina	Franco Coria	0	0	—		—		—		0	0	0	0	0	0	
–	CB	Argentina	Facundo Erpen	3	0	—		—		—		0	0	3	0	1	0	
–	RB	Argentina	Franco Flores	2	0	—		—		—		0	0	2	0	0	0	
–	DF	Argentina	Pablo Mattalia	0	0	—		—		—		0	0	0	0	0	0	
–	DF	Argentina	Alexis Rodríguez	0	0	—		—		—		0	0	0	0	0	0	
–	CB	Argentina	Juan Ignacio Sills	1	0	—		—		—		0	0	1	0	1	0	
–	DF	Argentina	José Villegas	0	0	—		—		—		0	0	0	0	0	0	
–	CB	Argentina	Gastón Yabale	0	0	—		—		—		0	0	0	0	0	0	
–	CM	Argentina	Ignacio Antonio	3	0	—		—		—		0	0	3	0	0	0	
–	LM	Argentina	Damián Arce	3	0	—		—		—		0	0	3	0	0	0	
–	CM	Argentina	Tobias Ballari	0	0	—		—		—		0	0	0	0	0	0	
–	RW	Argentina	Malcom Braida	3	0	—		—		—		0	0	3	0	0	0	
–	LM	Argentina	Emiliano Endrizzi	1	0	—		—		—		0	0	1	0	0	0	
–	AM	Argentina	Rodrigo Garro	2	0	—		—		—		0	0	2	0	0	0	
–	MF	Argentina	Maximiliano López	0(1)	0	—		—		—		0	0	0(1)	0	0	0	
–	MF	Argentina	Francisco Musso	0	0	—		—		—		0	0	0	0	0	0	
–	AM	Argentina	Facundo Silva	0(2)	0	—		—		—		0	0	0(2)	0	0	0	
–	MF	Argentina	Nicolás Watson	0(1)	0	—		—		—		0	0	0(1)	0	1	0	
–	CF	Argentina	Francisco Apaolaza	0(2)	0	—		—		—		0	0	0(2)	0	0	0	
–	FW	Argentina	Mateo Bajamich	3	1	—		—		—		0	0	3	1	1	0	
–	CF	Argentina	Facundo Castelli	0	0	—		—		—		0	0	0	0	0	0	
–	CF	Argentina Chile	Germán Estigarribia	0(1)	0	—		—		—		0	0	0(1)	0	0	0	
–	CF	Argentina	Martín Pino	3	1	—		—		—		0	0	3	1	0	0	
Own goals				—	0	—		—		—		—	0	—	0	—	—	—

Statistics accurate as of 3 September 2019.

=== Goalscorers ===
Rank	Pos	No.	Nat	Name	League	Cup	League Cup	Continental	Other	Total	Ref
1	FW	–	Argentina	Mateo Bajamich	1	0	—	—	0	1	
1	CF	–	Argentina	Martín Pino	1	0	—	—	0	1	
Own goals					0	0	—	—	0	0	
Totals					2	0	—	—	0	2	—
