= 2020 Torneo Federal A =

VIII Torneo Federal A
- Season: 2020
- Champions: Güemes (1st divisional title)
- Promoted: Güemes; Deportivo Maipú
- Relegated: None
- Matches played: 88
- Goals scored: 186 (2.11 per match)
- Biggest home win: Sportivo Belgrano 3-0 Defensores de Belgrano (VR) (December 9)
- Biggest away win: Sol de Mayo 0-4 Sportivo Peñarol (December 27)
- Highest scoring: Sportivo Las Parejas 2-4 Güemes (December 13)
- All statistics correct as of January 31, 2021.

The 2020 Argentine Torneo Federal A, also known as the 2020 Torneo Transición Federal A, was the eighth season of the Torneo Federal A, the regionalised third tier of the Argentine football league system. The tournament is reserved for teams indirectly affiliated to the Asociación del Fútbol Argentino (AFA), while teams affiliated to AFA have to play the Primera B Metropolitana, which is the other third tier competition. The competition was contested by 26 of the 30 teams that took part in the 2019–20 season, which was suspended and subsequently abandoned due to the COVID-19 pandemic, as it was optional to participate in this season. Two teams were promoted to Primera B Nacional and there was no relegation to Torneo Regional Federal Amateur. The regular season began on 4 December 2020 and ended on 31 January 2021.

== Format ==
The competition will be split into two stages: First Promotion and Second Promotion, which in turn, will be split into two groups according to the groupings and placements of teams in the previous season. The top seven teams of each group at the time of suspension of the previous season will play in the First Promotion stage, where they will be split into two groups, while the remaining teams from each group will play in the first round of the Second Promotion stage. In both stages, the teams will be placed in groups according to the ones they were in for the previous season. In the First Promotion stage, each team will play against the other teams in their group once, with the group winners playing a final match on neutral ground to decide the first promoted team to the Primera Nacional.

In the Second Promotion stage, each team will also play against the other teams in their group once, with the group winners qualifying for a knockout tournament where they will be joined by the teams that fail to earn promotion in the First Promotion stage, with the losing team of the Final having a bye to the second knockout round. The winners of that knockout tournament will earn the second promotion berth to the Primera National. Also, the losing team of the Final of the Second Promotion, has the right to play a Promotion playoff against one team from Primera B Metropolitana. There was no relegation in this season.

== Resignations ==
The following teams declined to participate in this season and will return in the 2021 season.

Team	City	Stadium
Crucero del Norte	Garupá	Andrés Guacurarí
Ferro Carril Oeste	General Pico	El Coloso del Barrio Talleres
Gimnasia y Esgrima	Concepción del Uruguay	Manuel y Ramón Núñez
San Martín	Formosa	17 De Octubre

== Club information ==
Locations of the 2020 season teams.
Blue: Zone A First Promotion; Yellow: Zone B First Promotion; Green: Zone A Second Promotion; Red: Zone B Second Promotion.

=== Zone A First Promotion ===
Team	City	Stadium
Central Norte	Salta	Padre Ernesto Martearena
Chaco For Ever	Resistencia	Juan Alberto García
Defensores	Pronunciamiento	Delio Cardozo
Douglas Haig	Pergamino	Miguel Morales
Güemes	Santiago del Estero	Arturo Miranda
Sarmiento	Resistencia	Centenario
Sportivo Las Parejas	Las Parejas	Fortaleza del Lobo

=== Zone B First Promotion ===
Team	City	Stadium
Deportivo Madryn	Puerto Madryn	Coliseo del Golfo
Deportivo Maipú	Maipú	Higinio Sperdutti
Huracán Las Heras	Las Heras	General San Martín
Juventud Unida Universitario	San Luis	Mario Diez
Olimpo	Bahía Blanca	Roberto Natalio Carminatti
Sansinena	General Cerri	Luis Molina
Villa Mitre	Bahía Blanca	El Fortín

=== Zone A Second Promotion ===
Team	City	Stadium
Boca Unidos	Corrientes	José Antonio Romero Feris
Defensores de Belgrano	Villa Ramallo	Salomón Boeseldín
Juventud Unida	Gualeguaychú	De los Eucaliptos
Sportivo Belgrano	San Francisco	Oscar Boero
Unión	Sunchales	La Fortaleza

=== Zone B Second Promotion ===
Team	City	Stadium
Cipolletti	Cipolletti	La Visera de Cemento
Círculo Deportivo	Comandante Nicanor Otamendi	Guillermo Trama
Deportivo Camioneros	General Rodríguez	Hugo Moyano
Desamparados	San Juan	El Serpentario
Estudiantes	San Luis	Héctor Odicino – Pedro Benoza
Sol de Mayo	Viedma	Sol de Mayo
Sportivo Peñarol	Chimbas	Ramón Pablo Rojas

== First Promotion stage ==
=== Zone A ===
Pos	Team	Pld	W	D	L	GF	GA	GD	Pts	Qualification or Relegation	GÜE	CNO	CFE	DOU	SAR	DPR	SLP
1	Güemes	6	5	0	1	10	5	+5	15	Advance to First Promotion Final	—	2–1	—	1–0	1–0	—	—
2	Central Norte	6	3	1	2	7	6	+1	10	Advance to Eliminatory stage first knockout round	—	—	2–1	1–1	—	—	1–0
3	Chaco For Ever	6	3	0	3	8	6	+2	9	Advance to Eliminatory stage first knockout round	2–0	—	—	—	0–2	3–1	—
4	Douglas Haig	6	2	3	1	5	4	+1	9	Advance to Eliminatory stage first knockout round	—	—	1–0	—	—	0–1	2–2
5	Sarmiento (R)	6	2	1	3	4	5	−1	7	Advance to Eliminatory stage first knockout round	—	1–0	—	0–1	—	—	1–1
6	Defensores (P)	6	1	2	3	5	8	−3	5	Advance to Eliminatory stage first knockout round	0–2	1–2	—	—	2–0	—	—
7	Sportivo Las Parejas	6	0	3	3	6	11	−5	3	Advance to Eliminatory stage first knockout round	2–4	—	0–2	—	—	1–1	—

Source: AFA
Rules for classification: 1) points; 2) Head-to-head points; 3) Head-to-head goal difference; 4) Head-to-head goals scored; 5) Head-to-head away goals; 6) Best position in 2019–20 season.

=== Zone B ===
Pos	Team	Pld	W	D	L	GF	GA	GD	Pts	Qualification	VMI	DEM	OLI	JUU	HLH	DMA	SAN
1	Villa Mitre	6	3	3	0	9	5	+4	12	Advance to First Promotion Final	—	1–0	3–1	1–1	—	—	—
2	Deportivo Maipú	6	3	1	2	7	4	+3	10	Advance to Eliminatory stage first knockout round	—	—	0–1	2–1	—	3–0	—
3	Olimpo	6	3	1	2	6	5	+1	10	Advance to Eliminatory stage first knockout round	—	—	—	—	2–0	2–0	0–0
4	Juventud Unida Universitario	6	2	2	2	8	6	+2	8	Advance to Eliminatory stage first knockout round	—	—	2–0	—	0–1	2–2	—
5	Huracán Las Heras	6	2	1	3	4	6	−2	7	Advance to Eliminatory stage first knockout round	2–2	0–1	—	—	—	—	1–0
6	Deportivo Madryn	6	2	1	3	6	10	−4	7	Advance to Eliminatory stage first knockout round	1–2	—	—	—	1–0	—	2–1
7	Sansinena	6	0	3	3	2	6	−4	3	Advance to Eliminatory stage first knockout round	0–0	1–1	—	0–2	—	—	—

Source: AFA
Rules for classification: 1) points; 2) Head-to-head points; 3) Head-to-head goal difference; 4) Head-to-head goals scored; 5) Head-to-head away goals; 6) Best position in 2019–20 season.

=== First Promotion Final ===
18 January 2021
17:10

Güemes	1–1	Villa Mitre
Romero 67'		Ihitz 90+1'
Penalties
Zárate (penalty scored); Canever (penalty scored); Romero (penalty scored); De Souza (penalty scored)	4–2	(penalty scored) Manchafico; (penalty scored) Tunessi; (penalty missed) Herrera; (penalty missed) López

Presidente Perón, Córdoba
Referee: Lucas Novelli

Güemes was promoted to Primera B Nacional.

== Second Promotion stage ==
=== Zone A ===
Pos	Team	Pld	W	D	L	GF	GA	GD	Pts	Qualification or Relegation	SPB	JUG	BOU	UNS	DEF
1	Sportivo Belgrano	4	3	1	0	8	3	+5	10	Advance to Eliminatory stage first knockout round	—	3–2	—	—	3–0
2	Juventud Unida (G)	4	1	2	1	10	8	+2	5		—	—	3–3	2–2	—
3	Boca Unidos	4	1	2	1	6	6	0	5		0–1	—	—	1–1	—
4	Unión (S)	4	0	4	0	5	5	0	4		1–1	—	—	—	1–1
5	Defensores de Belgrano (VR)	4	0	1	3	2	9	−7	1		—	0–3	1–2	—	—

Updated to match(es) played on December 19, 2020. Source: AFA
Rules for classification: 1) points; 2) Head-to-head points; 3) Head-to-head goal difference; 4) Head-to-head goals scored; 5) Head-to-head away goals; 6) Best position in 2019–20 season.

=== Zone B ===
Pos	Team	Pld	W	D	L	GF	GA	GD	Pts	Qualification or Relegation	DEP	DES	ESL	SPP	CIP	SOL	CDE
1	Deportivo Camioneros	6	4	2	0	5	0	+5	14	Advance to Eliminatory stage first knockout round	—	—	2–0	—	0–0	—	1–0
2	Desamparados	6	3	3	0	8	2	+6	12		0–0	—	1–0	—	1–1	—	—
3	Estudiantes (SL)	6	2	2	2	5	5	0	8		—	—	—	1–0	—	2–2	2–0
4	Sportivo Peñarol	6	2	1	3	6	5	+1	7		0–1	0–2	—	—	1–1	—	—
5	Cipolletti	6	1	4	1	3	3	0	7		—	—	0–0	—	—	0–1	1–0
6	Sol de Mayo	6	1	2	3	4	11	−7	5		0–1	1–4	—	0–4	—	—	—
7	Círculo Deportivo	6	0	2	4	0	5	−5	2		—	0–0	—	0–1	—	0–0	—

Source: AFA
Rules for classification: 1) points; 2) Head-to-head points; 3) Head-to-head goal difference; 4) Head-to-head goals scored; 5) Head-to-head away goals; 6) Best position in 2019–20 season.

=== Eliminatory Stage ===
==== First knockout round ====
The first knockout round will be contested by 14 teams: the 12 teams ranked from 2nd to 7th place in their groups of the First Promotion stage and the top team from each group of the Second Promotion stage. In this round, the 14 teams will be seeded according to their performance and placements in the previous stage of the competition, with teams coming from the First Promotion stage being given a higher seed, and paired against a rival according to their seed: Team 1 vs. Team 14, Team 2 vs. Team 13 and so on, playing a single match on local ground. The 7 winners will advance to the second knockout round.

Pos	Grp	Team	Pld	W	D	L	GF	GA	GD	Pts	Qualification
1	B	Deportivo Maipú	6	3	1	2	7	4	+3	10	Qualified from First Promotion stage
2	A	Central Norte	6	3	1	2	7	6	+1	10	Qualified from First Promotion stage
3	B	Olimpo	6	3	1	2	6	5	+1	10	Qualified from First Promotion stage
4	A	Chaco For Ever	6	3	0	3	8	6	+2	9	Qualified from First Promotion stage
5	A	Douglas Haig	6	2	3	1	5	4	+1	9	Qualified from First Promotion stage
6	B	Juventud Unida Universitario	6	2	2	2	8	6	+2	8	Qualified from First Promotion stage
7	A	Sarmiento (R)	6	2	1	3	4	5	−1	7	Qualified from First Promotion stage
8	B	Huracán Las Heras	6	2	1	3	4	6	−2	7	Qualified from First Promotion stage
9	B	Deportivo Madryn	6	2	1	3	6	10	−4	7	Qualified from First Promotion stage
10	A	Defensores (P)	6	1	2	3	5	8	−3	5	Qualified from First Promotion stage
11	B	Sansinena	6	0	3	3	2	6	−4	3	Qualified from First Promotion stage
12	A	Sportivo Las Parejas	6	0	3	3	6	11	−5	3	Qualified from First Promotion stage
13	A	Sportivo Belgrano	4	3	1	0	8	3	+5	10 (Note: Sportivo Belgrano ahead of Deportivo Camioneros on points average obtained in the Second Promotion stage: Sportivo Belgrano 2,500; Deportivo Camioneros 2,333.)	Qualified from Second Promotion stage
14	B	Deportivo Camioneros	6	4	2	0	5	0	+5	14	Qualified from Second Promotion stage

Source: AFA
Notes:

17 January 2021	Deportivo Maipú	1–0	Deportivo Camioneros	Maipú, Pcia. de Mendoza
17:30	Persia 20'			Stadium: Omar Higinio Sperdutti; Referee: Jonathan Correa

17 January 2021	Central Norte	3–3 (2–4 p)	Sportivo Belgrano	Salta, Pcia. de Salta
18:00	Giménez 35'; Bravo 37'; Gaggi 84'		Camisassa 52'; Gaviglio 68'; Avaro 73'	Stadium: Padre Ernesto Martearena; Referee: Nelson Bejas

17 January 2021	Olimpo	3–3 (4–5 p)	Sportivo Las Parejas	Bahía Blanca, Pcia. de Buenos Aires
20:00	Guille 12', 64'; Ferreyra 70'		Gutiérrez 1'; Salvatierra 16'; Bocchietti 55'	Stadium: Roberto N. Carminatti; Referee: Gastón Monzón

17 January 2021	Chaco For Ever	2–0	Sansinena	Resistencia, Pcia. de Chaco
20:00	Cáceres 36' (pen.)			Stadium: Juan Alberto García; Referee: Luis Lobo Medina

17 January 2021	Douglas Haig	2–1	Defensores (P)	Pergamino, Pcia. de Buenos Aires
17:15	Fernández 34'; Stella 85'		Valente 32'	Stadium: Miguel Morales; Referee: Maximiliano Macheroni

17 January 2021	Juventud Unida Universitario	1–1 (4–5 p)	Deportivo Madryn	La Punta, Pcia. de San Luis
19:00	González 69'		Giménez 76' (pen.)	Stadium: Juan Gilberto Funes; Referee: Sergio Testa

17 January 2021	Sarmiento (R)	2–1	Huracán Las Heras	Resistencia, Pcia. de Chaco
20:00	Parera 28'; Berra 58'		Herrera 33' (pen.)	Stadium: Centenario; Referee: Fabricio Llobet

==== Second knockout round ====
The second knockout round will be contested by 8 teams: the 7 winning teams from First knockout round and the losing team from the First Promotion Final. In this round, the 8 teams will be seeded according to their performance and placements in the previous stage of the competition, with teams coming from the First Promotion stage being given a higher seed, and paired against a rival according to their seed: Team 1 vs. Team 8, Team 2 vs. Team 7 and so on, playing a single match on local ground. The 4 winners will advance to the third knockout round.

Pos	Grp	Team	Pld	W	D	L	GF	GA	GD	Pts	Qualification
1	B	Villa Mitre	6	3	3	0	9	5	+4	12	Qualified from First Promotion Final
2	B	Deportivo Maipú	6	3	1	2	7	4	+3	10	Qualified from First Promotion stage
3	A	Chaco For Ever	6	3	0	3	8	6	+2	9	Qualified from First Promotion stage
4	A	Douglas Haig	6	2	3	1	5	4	+1	9	Qualified from First Promotion stage
5	A	Sarmiento (R)	6	2	1	3	4	5	−1	7	Qualified from First Promotion stage
6	B	Deportivo Madryn	6	2	1	3	6	10	−4	7	Qualified from First Promotion stage
7	A	Sportivo Las Parejas	6	0	3	3	6	11	−5	3	Qualified from First Promotion stage
8	A	Sportivo Belgrano	4	3	1	0	8	3	+5	10	Qualified from Second Promotion stage

Source: AFA

23 January 2021	Villa Mitre	2–0	Sportivo Belgrano	Bahía Blanca, Pcia. de Buenos Aires
20:30	Tunessi 72' (pen.); Herrera 90+6'			Stadium: El Fortín; Referee: Maximiliano Macheroni

22 January 2021	Deportivo Maipú	1–0	Sportivo Las Parejas	Maipú, Pcia. de Mendoza
17:15	Persia 13'			Stadium: Omar Higinio Sperdutti; Referee: Luis Lobo Medina

22 January 2021	Chaco For Ever	0–1	Deportivo Madryn	Resistencia, Pcia. de Chaco
19:00			Torres 80'	Stadium: Juan Alberto García; Referee: Carlos Gariano

22 January 2021	Douglas Haig	0–2	Sarmiento (R)	Pergamino, Pcia. de Buenos Aires
17:15			Silba 69'; Sagarzazú 90+1'	Stadium: Miguel Morales; Referee: Carlos Córdoba

==== Third knockout round ====
The third knockout round will be contested by 4 teams: all the 4 winning teams from second knockout round. In this round, the 4 teams will be seeded according to their performance and placements in the previous stage of the competition, with teams coming from the First Promotion stage being given a higher seed, and paired against a rival according to their seed: Team 1 vs. Team 4, Team 2 vs. Team 3, playing a single match on local ground. The 2 winners will advance to the fourth knockout round.

Pos	Grp	Team	Pld	W	D	L	GF	GA	GD	Pts	Qualification
1	B	Villa Mitre	6	3	3	0	9	5	+4	12	Qualified from First Promotion Final
2	B	Deportivo Maipú	6	3	1	2	7	4	+3	10	Qualified from First Promotion stage
3	A	Sarmiento (R)	6	2	1	3	4	5	−1	7	Qualified from First Promotion stage
4	B	Deportivo Madryn	6	2	1	3	6	10	−4	7	Qualified from First Promotion stage

Source: AFA

27 January 2021	Villa Mitre	1–1 (3–4 p)	Deportivo Madryn	Bahía Blanca, Pcia. de Buenos Aires
20:30	Tunessi 1'		Lopez 90+1' (pen.)	Stadium: El Fortín; Referee: Nelson Bejas

27 January 2021	Deportivo Maipú	2–0	Sarmiento (R)	Maipú, Pcia. de Mendoza
17:30	Corulo 78' (pen.); Daher 88'			Stadium: Omar Higinio Sperdutti; Referee: Gastón Monzón

==== Fourth knockout round ====
The fourth knockout round will be contested by 2 teams: all the 2 winning teams from third knockout round. In this round, the 2 teams will be seeded according to their performance and placements in the previous stage of the competition, with teams coming from the First Promotion stage being given a higher seed, and paired against a rival according to their seed: Team 1 vs. Team 2, playing a single match on local ground. The winner will be promoted to Primera B Nacional and the loser will play a Promotion playoff against one team from Primera B Metropolitana.

Pos	Team	Pld	W	D	L	GF	GA	GD	Pts	Qualification
1	Deportivo Maipú	6	3	1	2	7	4	+3	10	Qualified from First Promotion stage
2	Deportivo Madryn	6	2	1	3	6	10	−4	7	Qualified from First Promotion stage

Source: AFA

31 January 2021	Deportivo Maipú	2–0	Deportivo Madryn	Maipú, Pcia. de Mendoza
17:15	Veliez 7'; Persia 25'			Stadium: Omar Higinio Sperdutti; Referee: Pablo Echavarría

Deportivo Maipú was promoted to Primera B Nacional.

==== Promotion playoff ====
The loser of fourth knockout round will play a Promotion playoff against one team from Primera B Metropolitana.

4 February 2021	San Telmo	0–0 (3–1 p)	Deportivo Madryn	Rosario, Pcia. de Santa Fe
21:30		Report		Stadium: Marcelo Bielsa; Referee: Diego Abal
	Penalties
	Velázquez (penalty missed); Ada (penalty scored); Toledo (penalty scored); Depetris (penalty scored)		(penalty missed) Giménez; (penalty scored) Bona; (penalty missed) López; (penalty missed) Canuhé

San Telmo was promoted to Primera B Nacional.

== See also ==
- 2020 Copa de la Liga Profesional
- 2020 Primera B Nacional
- 2020 Primera B Metropolitana
- 2019–20 Copa Argentina
