= Taborda =

Taborda is a surname. Notable people with the surname include:

- Catarina Taborda, Bissau-Guinean politician
- César Taborda, Argentine football goalkeeper
- Cristián Taborda, Argentine football striker
- Éric Taborda, French footballer
- Facundo Taborda, Argentine footballer
- Federico Taborda, Argentine footballer
- Gonzalo Taborda, Argentine footballer
- Jazmín Taborda, Ecuadorian road cyclist
- José da Cunha Taborda, Portuguese painter and architect
- Juan Taborda, Spanish conquistador
- Martina Capurro Taborda, Argentine tennis player
- Pedro Taborda, Portuguese football goalkeeper
- Sebastián Taborda, Uruguayan footballer
- Tarzan Taborda, Portuguese professional wrestler
- Tato Taborda, Brazilian composer and pianist
- Vicente Taborda, Argentine footballer
