= Endrizzi =

Endrizzi is an Italian surname.

== Notable people ==
- Renato Marcos Endrizzi Sabbatini (born 1947), Brazilian scientist and writer
- Luciano Endrizzi (1921–1986), Italian-Brazilian physician and surgeon
- Walter Endrizzi, Italian paralympic athlete.
- Emiliano Endrizzi (born 1994), Argentine footballer
