= Fabricio Henricot =

Argentine footballer (born 1990)

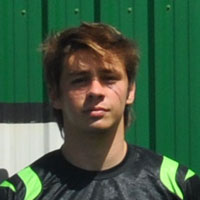

Personal information
- Date of birth: 26 April 1990 (age 36)
- Place of birth: Zárate, Argentina
- Position: Goalkeeper

Team information
- Current team: Alvarado

Youth career
- Racing Club

Senior career*
Years	Team	Apps	(Gls)
2012–2017	Boca Unidos	43	(0)
2017–2019	Instituto	5	(0)
2019–2020	Douglas Haig	22	(0)
2020–2021	Deportivo Armenio	35	(0)
2022	Douglas Haig	4	(0)
2022–2024	Defensores Unidos	89	(0)
2025–	Alvarado	13	(0)
- * Club domestic league appearances and goals as of 15:58, 2 July 2025 (UTC)

Fabricio Henricot (born 26 April 1990) is an Argentine professional footballer who plays as a goalkeeper for Alvarado.

== Career ==
Racing Club were a youth team of Henricot's. He began his senior career with Boca Unidos. He was an unused substitute six times in 2012–13 in Primera B Nacional, prior to making his professional bow in the following campaign in a 2–0 victory over San Martín on 6 June 2014. He remained with the club for four further seasons, making a total of forty-three appearances in all competitions. In July 2017, Henricot signed with fellow tier two outfit Instituto. He didn't appear competitively in 2017–18 as they reached the promotion play-offs; where they lost to Sarmiento. July 2019 saw Henricot join Douglas Haig.

== Career statistics ==
As of 18 July 2020.

Club statistics
Club	Season	League			Cup		Continental		Other		Total	
Club	Season	Division	Apps	Goals	Apps	Goals	Apps	Goals	Apps	Goals	Apps	Goals
Boca Unidos	2012–13	Primera B Nacional	0	0	0	0	—		0	0	0	0
Boca Unidos	2013–14	Primera B Nacional	1	0	0	0	—		0	0	1	0
Boca Unidos	2014	Primera B Nacional	4	0	0	0	—		0	0	4	0
Boca Unidos	2015	Primera B Nacional	13	0	0	0	—		0	0	13	0
Boca Unidos	2016	Primera B Nacional	10	0	0	0	—		0	0	10	0
Boca Unidos	2016–17	Primera B Nacional	15	0	0	0	—		0	0	15	0
Boca Unidos	Total		43	0	0	0	—		0	0	43	0
Instituto	2017–18	Primera B Nacional	0	0	0	0	—		0	0	0	0
Instituto	2018–19	Primera B Nacional	5	0	0	0	—		0	0	5	0
Instituto	Total		5	0	0	0	—		0	0	5	0
Douglas Haig	2019–20	Torneo Federal A	22	0	3	0	—		0	0	25	0
Deportivo Armenio	2020-21	Primera B	35	0	0	0	—		0	0	35	0
Career total			105	0	3	0	—		0	0	108	0
