= Miguel Escobar =

Argentine footballer

Personal information
- Full name: Miguel Alejandro Escobar
- Date of birth: 24 August 1995 (age 31)
- Place of birth: Moreno, Argentina
- Height: 1.66 m (5 ft 5 in)
- Position: Attacking midfielder

Team information
- Current team: GV San José
- Number: 8

Youth career
- 2000–2009: Los Polleros
- 2009–2014: Banfield

Senior career*
| Years | Team | Apps | (Gls) |
| 2014–2017 | Banfield | 2 | (0) |
| 2016–2017 | → Defensores (loan) | 21 | (2) |
| 2017 | Senglea Athletic | 5 | (0) |
| 2018 | Magallanes | 7 | (1) |
| 2018–2019 | JJ Urquiza | 21 | (1) |
| 2019–2020 | Sportivo Belgrano | 12 | (2) |
| 2020–2021 | Los Andes | 11 | (0) |
| 2022 | General Caballero JLM | 0 | (0) |
| 2023 | Santos Nasca | 17 | (1) |
| 2025 | Oruro Royal | | |
| 2025– | GV San José | 6 | (0) |
- * Club domestic league appearances and goals as of 30 December 2025

Miguel Alejandro Escobar (born 24 August 1995) is an Argentine footballer who plays as an attacking midfielder for GV San José.

== Career ==
After youth spells with Los Polleros and Banfield, Escobar started his pro career in Argentina with the latter. He first appeared on the club's substitutes bench for an Argentine Primera División draw with Atlético de Rafaela in October 2014. He made his professional debut on 16 February 2016 in a league match versus Quilmes, with his only other appearance in 2016 coming against Godoy Cruz just over a week later. In July 2016, Escobar joined Defensores de Belgrano of Primera B Metropolitana on loan. He scored two goals in twenty-one games.

August 2017 saw Escobar join Maltese Premier League side Senglea Athletic. His first appearance for Senglea came in a 0–1 defeat to Valletta on 25 August. In total, he played five times for Senglea. In January 2018, Escobar signed for Primera B de Chile team Magallanes. He netted his first Magallanes goal during a Copa Chile match with Tomás Greig FC in May. A move to JJ Urquiza was completed in the following August. After spending the 2019–20 campaign with Sportivo Belgrano, Escobar headed to Los Andes in October 2020.

== Career statistics ==
As of 30 December 2020.

Club statistics
| Club | Season | League | | | Cup | | League Cup | | Continental | | Other | | Total | |
| Club | Season | Division | Apps | Goals | Apps | Goals | Apps | Goals | Apps | Goals | Apps | Goals | Apps | Goals |
|---|---|---|---|---|---|---|---|---|---|---|---|---|---|---|
| Banfield | 2014 | Primera División | 0 | 0 | 0 | 0 | — | | — | | 0 | 0 | 0 | 0 |
| Banfield | 2015 | Primera División | 0 | 0 | 0 | 0 | — | | — | | 0 | 0 | 0 | 0 |
| Banfield | 2016 | Primera División | 2 | 0 | 0 | 0 | — | | — | | 0 | 0 | 2 | 0 |
| Banfield | 2016–17 | Primera División | 0 | 0 | 0 | 0 | — | | 0 | 0 | 0 | 0 | 0 | 0 |
| Banfield | Total | | 2 | 0 | 0 | 0 | — | | 0 | 0 | 0 | 0 | 2 | 0 |
| Defensores de Belgrano (loan) | 2016–17 | Primera B Metropolitana | 21 | 2 | 1 | 0 | — | | — | | 0 | 0 | 22 | 2 |
| Senglea Athletic | 2017–18 | Premier League | 5 | 0 | 0 | 0 | — | | — | | 0 | 0 | 5 | 0 |
| Magallanes | 2018 | Primera B | 7 | 1 | 2 | 1 | — | | — | | 0 | 0 | 9 | 2 |
| JJ Urquiza | 2018–19 | Primera B Metropolitana | 21 | 1 | 0 | 0 | — | | — | | 0 | 0 | 21 | 1 |
| Sportivo Belgrano | 2019–20 | Torneo Federal A | 12 | 2 | 1 | 0 | — | | — | | 0 | 0 | 13 | 2 |
| Los Andes | 2020 | Primera B Metropolitana | 1 | 0 | 0 | 0 | — | | — | | 0 | 0 | 1 | 0 |
| Career total | | | 69 | 6 | 4 | 1 | — | | 0 | 0 | 0 | 0 | 73 | 7 |
