= Marcelo Argüello =

Argentine footballer

Personal information
- Full name: Marcelo Emanuel Argüello
- Date of birth: 19 January 1993 (age 33)
- Place of birth: Monje, Argentina
- Height: 1.86 m (6 ft 1 in)
- Position: Centre-forward

Team information
- Current team: Deportivo Merlo

Youth career
- Sebastián Gaboto
- 2010–2012: Colón

Senior career*
Years	Team	Apps	(Gls)
2012–2016	Colón	6	(0)
2014–2015	→ Gimnasia Jujuy (loan)	9	(0)
2016	→ Deportivo Quito (loan)	5	(2)
2016–2017	Gimnasia Concepción	18	(4)
2017–2018	Universitario de Sucre	25	(11)
2018–2019	Olimpo	15	(1)
2019–2020	Sportivo Belgrano	14	(2)
2020	Santos	9	(5)
2021	Real Santa Cruz	6	(0)
2021	Universitario de Sucre		
2022	Gimnasia Jujuy	12	(1)
2022–	Deportivo Merlo	6	(1)
- * Club domestic league appearances and goals as of 21:19, 21 July 2022 (UTC)

Marcelo Emanuel Argüello (born 19 January 1993) is an Argentine professional footballer who plays as a centre-forward for Deportivo Merlo.

== Career ==
Argüello started his career with Colón, after a stint with Sebastián Gaboto. He made four appearances during the 2012–13 season, which included his Primera División bow against San Martín on 10 August 2012 and his Copa Sudamericana debut on 23 August versus Racing Club. In July 2014, Argüello was loaned to Gimnasia y Esgrima of San Salvador de Jujuy. Eleven matches followed across the 2014 and 2015 seasons in Primera B Nacional. A loan move to Deportivo Quito was completed in January 2016. He scored two goals, against Portoviejo's Colón FC and Imbabura, in five games.

2016 saw Argüello leave parent club Colón to join Concepción del Uruguay's Gimnasia y Esgrima. The forward netted four times in the 2016–17 Torneo Federal A, including two against Defensores de Pronunciamiento as they finished sixth. In mid-2017, Argüello switched Argentina for Bolivia by agreeing a contract with Universitario de Sucre. He scored on his starting debut versus Real Potosí on 13 August, on the way to a total of six goals throughout the third part of 2016–17. Argüello remained for one further campaign in Bolivia's top-flight, appearing eleven more times whilst scoring five goals.

Argüello returned to Argentina with Olimpo of Primera B Nacional on 15 July 2018, remaining for one season before heading to Sportivo Belgrano. In February 2020, Argüello terminated his contract in order to join a Peruvian team - later revealed to be Santos of the Segunda División. He scored on debut against Cultural Santa Rosa on 27 October, which preceded further goals against Deportivo Coopsol, Alianza Atlético, Unión Huaral and Chavelines Juniors as they placed second bottom of a ten-team division. In January 2021, Argüello made a return to the Bolivian Primera División with Real Santa Cruz.

After leaving Real Santa Cruz in July 2021, Argüello returned to his former club Universitario de Sucre, who was now playing in the Copa Simón Bolívar. Argüello helped the club with promotion to the Bolivian Primera División again for the 2022 season. In January 2022, he moved back to his homeland, and signed for Gimnasia Jujuy, before joining a news club again in June 2022; Deportivo Merlo.

== Career statistics ==
As of 14 January 2021.

Appearances and goals by club, season and competition
Club	Season	League			Cup		League Cup		Continental		Other		Total	
Club	Season	Division	Apps	Goals	Apps	Goals	Apps	Goals	Apps	Goals	Apps	Goals	Apps	Goals
Colón	2012–13	Argentine Primera División	3	0	0	0	—		1 (Note: Appearance(s) in the Copa Sudamericana)	0	0	0	4	0
Colón	2013–14	Argentine Primera División	3	0	0	0	—		—		0	0	3	0
Colón	2014	Primera B Nacional	0	0	0	0	—		—		0	0	0	0
Colón	2015	Argentine Primera División	0	0	0	0	—		—		0	0	0	0
Colón	2016	Argentine Primera División	0	0	0	0	—		—		0	0	0	0
Colón	Total		6	0	0	0	—		1	0	0	0	7	0
Gimnasia y Esgrima (J) (loan)	2014	Primera B Nacional	7	0	0	0	—		—		2 (Note: Appearance(s) in the Primera B Nacional play-offs)	0	9	0
Gimnasia y Esgrima (J) (loan)	2015	Primera B Nacional	2	0	0	0	—		—		0	0	2	0
Gimnasia y Esgrima (J) (loan)	Total		9	0	0	0	—		—		2	0	11	0
Deportivo Quito (loan)	2016	Serie B	5	2	0	0	—		—		0	0	5	2
Gimnasia y Esgrima (CdU)	2016–17	Torneo Federal A	18	4	0	0	—		—		0	0	18	4
Universitario de Sucre	2016–17	Bolivian Primera División	16	6	0	0	—		—		1 (Note: Appearance(s) in the Bolivian Primera División play-offs)	0	17	6
Universitario de Sucre	2018	Bolivian Primera División	9	5	0	0	—		—		2	0	11	5
Universitario de Sucre	Total		25	11	0	0	—		—		3	0	28	11
Olimpo	2018–19	Primera B Nacional	15	1	0	0	—		—		0	0	15	1
Sportivo Belgrano	2019–20	Torneo Federal A	14	2	0	0	—		—		0	0	14	2
Santos	2020	Segunda División	9	5	0	0	—		—		0	0	9	5
Real Santa Cruz	2021	Bolivian Primera División	0	0	0	0	—		—		0	0	0	0
Career total			101	25	0	0	—		1	0	5	0	107	25
