= Gaviglio =

Gaviglio is a surname. Notable people with the surname include:

- Ezequiel Gaviglio (born 1987), Argentine footballer
- Flavia Gaviglio (born 1963), Italian mountain runner
- Sam Gaviglio (born 1990), American baseball pitcher
