= Franco Flores =

Franco Flores may refer to:

- Franco Flores (footballer, born 1987), Argentine defender
- Franco Flores (footballer, born 1993), Argentine defender
