= Ezequiel Gaviglio =

Argentine footballer

Personal information
- Full name: Ezequiel Gaviglio
- Date of birth: December 15, 1987 (age 38)
- Place of birth: San Francisco, Argentina
- Height: 1.85 m (6 ft 1 in)
- Position: Forward

Team information
- Current team: Sportivo Belgrano

Youth career
- 2002–2005: Sportivo Belgrano

Senior career*
Years	Team	Apps	(Gls)
2006–2009	Sportivo Belgrano		
2009–2010	Tiro Federal	23	(6)
2010–2012	General Paz Juniors	43	(31)
2012–2013	Guaraní Antonio Franco	22	(6)
2013–2014	Universitario de Sucre	15	(2)
2014	Naval de Talcahuano	7	(1)
2014–2016	Unión Villa Krause	31	(11)
2016–2019	Sportivo Belgrano	69	(21)
2019–2020	Douglas Haig	8	(0)
2020–	Sportivo Belgrano	6	(3)
- * Club domestic league appearances and goals as of 18:16, 24 March 2020 (UTC)

Ezequiel Gaviglio (born December 15, 1987, in San Francisco) is an Argentine football forward for Sportivo Belgrano.
