= Luciano Endrizzi =

Brazilian physician

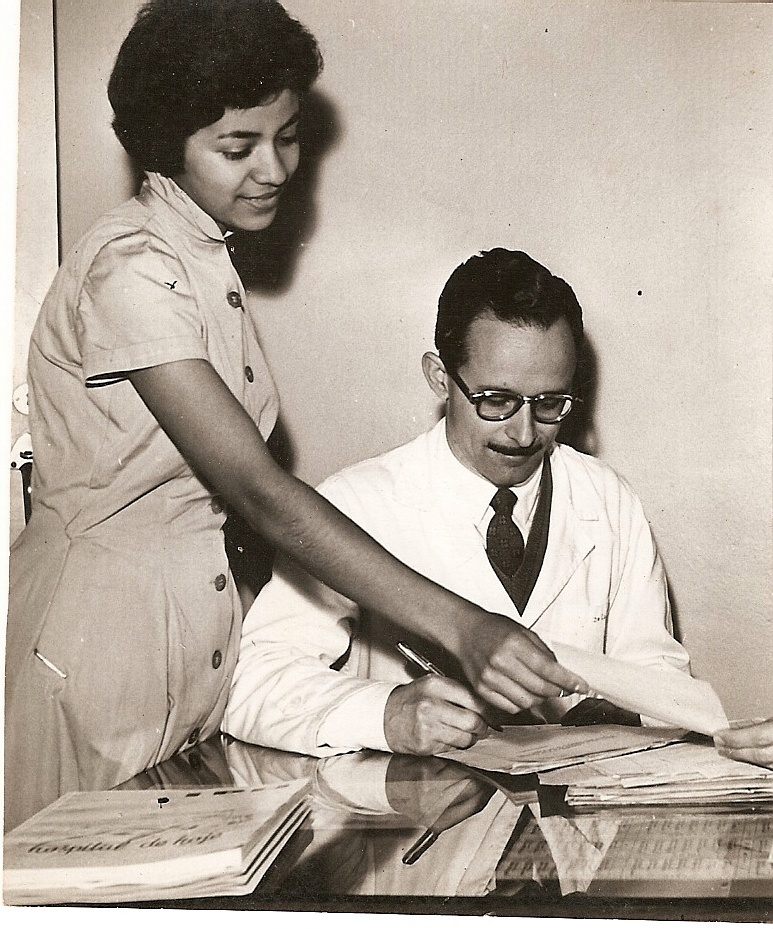
Dr. Luciano Endrizzi, ca. 1963

Luciano Giuseppe Felice Endrizzi (born January 8, 1921, Rovereto, Italy; d. May 1986, São Paulo, Brazil) was an Italian Brazilian physician and surgeon. who became one of the most respected gynecologists and obstetricians in the country.

== Early life and education ==
Endrizzi was born in Italy to Henrique Endrizzi, an Italian-Brazilian agronomist specialized in enology and Adelina Anna Maria (Gelinda) Roat, an Austrian from Ischia di Pergine, near Trento (now Italy). The family moved in 1921 to Brazil, where his uncle, Américo Virgílio Endrizzi, was living as a Catholic priest who helped build the Santa Casa Stella Maris in the city of Caraguatatuba, undoing all its family heritage and donating a plot of land for its construction. Following the practice of his father, who worked as a travelling rural adviser for the Instituto Agronômico de Campinas, Endrizzi lived and studied each year in a different city: Piracicaba in 1928, Botucatu in 1929, Bauru in 1930, Sorocaba in 1931, Campinas in 1932–1933, São Carlos in 1934–1935, Campinas again in 1937, and São Paulo in 1938-1939 (where he started in the pre-medical school).

In 1940 he began studying Medicine at the University of São Paulo. While a student there, he worked as internist under Alípio Correa Neto and Mário Gatti.

== Career ==
After graduation, in 1945, Dr. Endrizzi became an assistant anesthesiologist, the head of the blood bank at a hospital in São Paulo, an obstetrician in its maternity ward, and a gynecological surgeon. From 1957 to 1963 he was clinical director at the SESC Maternity of São Paulo,

Endrizzi became widely known when he accepted a position as assistant surgeon at the Service of Gynecology at the Maternidade de São Paulo in October 1963. He worked there until his death from colon cancer in 1986. By this time he had become chief surgeon at the hospital. In 1964 he published the first known case of surgical correction of vaginal atresia (congenital absence of a vagina) with neovaginoplasty where the patient could deliver two babies in normal parturition. In 1972 he earned a doctorate from the Department of Gynecology and Obstetrics of the Faculty of Medicine of the University of São Paulo. His thesis was entitled "Contribuição para o Tratamento da Insuficiência Cervical Uterina pela Circlagem" (A Contribution for the Treatment of Uterine Cervical Insufficiency by Cerclage). Endrizzi was a pioneer in the introduction of the cerclage surgical procedure in the treatment of cervical incompetence in Brazil.

Endrizzi was an assistant professor at the Faculdade de Medicina do ABC, in Santo André, from 1977 until 1986. In addition to his medical duties, he was active in promoting the scientific and associational aspects of gynecology in São Paulo. He was the chairman of medical education at Maternidade de São Paulo (1982–1986), chairman of the Department of Maternal and Child Health of the Faculdade de Medicina (19841985), and member of its Committee of Bioethics (1978).

== Personal life ==
Endrizzi had an interest in erudite music, owned a large collection of records, and was in charge of the cultural section of music at the Associação Paulista de Medicina (Medical Association of São Paulo). His name has been honoured in the Centro de Estudos Luciano Endrizzi at the Maternidade de São Paulo, which received the donation of his private library following his death.

Endrizzi never married and had no children. He was survived by four sisters and one brother.

== Bibliography ==
- Endrizzi, L.; Arcuri, A. Agenesis of the vagina with hematometra. Neovaginoplasty followed by two pregnancies at term. Rev Ginecol Obstet (São Paulo). 1964 Nov;115:320-5. Portuguese. PMID 14295152
- De Rudge, W.S.; Endrizzi, L. Management of recently infected ectopic pregnancy. Rev Ginecol Obstet (São Paulo). 1956 May;50(5):331-40. PMID 13350865
