= Braian Camisassa =

Argentine footballer

Personal information
- Full name: Braian Emanuel Camisassa
- Date of birth: 30 July 1997 (age 29)
- Place of birth: San Francisco, Córdoba, Argentina
- Height: 1.81 m (5 ft 11 in)
- Position: Centre-back

Team information
- Current team: Deportes Santa Cruz
- Number: 5

Youth career
- Racing de Castex
- Antártida Argentina
- Sportivo Belgrano

Senior career*
| Years | Team | Apps | (Gls) |
| 2018–2025 | Sportivo Belgrano | 71 | (5) |
| 2022 | → Villa Dálmine (loan) | 25 | (4) |
| 2023 | → Atlanta (loan) | 6 | (0) |
| 2023 | → Guaireña (loan) | 10 | (0) |
| 2024 | → Agropecuario (loan) | 17 | (0) |
| 2026– | Deportes Santa Cruz | 4 | (0) |
- * Club domestic league appearances and goals as of 19 March 2026

Braian Emanuel Camisassa (born 30 July 1997) is an Argentine footballer who plays as a centre-back for Chilean club Deportes Santa Cruz.

== Club career ==
Born in San Francisco, Argentina, Camisassa is a product of Sportivo Belgrano and made his professional debut in 2018. He was loaned out to Villa Dálmine and Atlanta in 2022 and 2023, respectively.

In the second half of 2023, Camisassa moved on loan to Paraguayan club Guaireña in the División de Honor. Back in Argentina, he was loaned out to Agropecuario for the 2024 season.

Camisassa returned to Sportivo Belgrano for the 2025 season.

In January 2026, Camisassa moved abroad again and signed with Chilean club Deportes Santa Cruz.
