= Gonzalo Taborda =

Argentine footballer

Personal information
- Full name: Gonzalo José Taborda
- Date of birth: 7 May 1979 (age 47)
- Place of birth: San Francisco, Argentina
- Height: 1.74 m (5 ft 9 in)
- Positions: Right midfielder; right-back

Senior career*
Years	Team	Apps	(Gls)
1997–2002	Almirante Brown		
2002–2003	Deportivo Colonia	37	(2)
2003–2005	El Porvenir	66	(2)
2006	Central Córdoba Rosario	2	(0)
2006	Unión San Felipe	11	(1)
2007–2008	El Porvenir	20	(1)
2003–2005	Acassuso	28	(0)
2???	Sportivo Belgrano		
- * Club domestic league appearances and goals

Gonzalo José Taborda (born 7 May 1979 in San Francisco, Argentina) is a former Argentine footballer who played as a right midfielder or right-back for clubs of Argentina, Chile and Uruguay.

== Teams ==
- (Argentina) Almirante Brown 1997–2002
- (Uruguay) Deportivo Colonia 2002–2003
- (Argentina) El Porvenir 2003–2005
- (Argentina) Central Córdoba de Rosario 2006
- (Chile) Unión San Felipe 2006
- (Argentina) El Porvenir 2007–2008
- (Argentina) Acassuso 2008–2009
- (Argentina) Sportivo Belgrano
