= Boluspor =

Turkish football club

- Full name: Boluspor Kulübü
- Nickname: Bolu Beyi
- Founded: 28 December 1965; 60 years ago
- Ground: Bolu Atatürk Stadium, Bolu
- Capacity: 2,454
- Coordinates: 40°44′11″N 31°36′24″E
- Chairman: Erdal Bayrak
- Head coach: Mustapha Yatabaré
- League: TFF 1. Lig
- 2025–26: TFF 1. Lig, 15th of 20
- Website: boluspor.org.tr
Home colours	Away colours	Third colours

Boluspor, known as Geosis Boluspor due to sponsorship reasons, is a Turkish professional football club located in the city of Bolu. The clubs plays in red and white kits, and have done so since their formation in 1965. Some of famous players of her were Lütfü Isıgöllü, Sinan Alayoğlu, Sadullah Acele, Rıdvan Dilmen, Sercan Görgülü, Halil İbrahim Eren, Recep Çetin, Ali Beykoz, Şenol Fidan, Müfit İkizoğlu and Faruk Yiğit.

Domestically, the club has won the TFF Second League on one occasion, finishing as runner-up to the Turkish Cup. Their greatest success in top-flight football came in 1974, when they finished in third place.

== History ==
Boluspor became a professional club when they entered the TFF Second League (now TFF First League) during the 1966–67 season. They were first promoted into the TFF First League (Now Super League) after the 1969–70 season. They finished third, their highest finish in the Süper Lig in 1973–74 season.

The club has competed in continental competition once, losing to Dinamo Bucharest, in the 1974–75 UEFA Cup. They also competed in the now defunct Balkans Cup, winning matches against clubs such as Sofya Akademik and Sport Clup Bacau, but never won the cup.

On 12 February 2026, Suat Kaya was appointed as the manager of TFF 1. Lig club Boluspor, succeeding Erdal Güneş.

=== Turkish Football League ===
League Spots

In 2006-2007, the second and third league reshape and its name was changed to TFF 1st League, TFF 2nd League and First Tier named was Super League 1. Lig

== Honours ==
- Turkish Cup:
  - Runners-up (1): 1981
- TFF Second League:
  - Winners (1): 2007
- Prime Minister's Cup:
  - Winners (1): 1970
- Prime Minister's Cup:
  - Winners (1): 1981
- Süper Lig:
  - Runners-up (3): 1974
- Süper Lig:
  - Runners-up (4): 1983

== League participation ==
- Süper Lig: 1970–1979, 1980–1985, 1986–1992
- TFF First League: 1966–1970, 1979–1980, 1985–1986, 1992–1996, 1997–2001, 2007–
- TFF Second League: 2001–2002, 2005–2007
- TFF Third League: 1996–1997, 2002–2005

== European competitions ==
As of 2 October 1974

Competition	Pld	W	D	L	GF	GA	GD
UEFA Cup	2	0	0	2	0	4	–4
Balkans Cup	4	0	1	3	3	12	–9
Total	6	0	1	5	3	16	–13

UEFA Cup:

Season	Round	Club	Home	Away	Aggregate
1974–75	1R	(Romania) Dinamo București	0–1	0–3	0–4

Balkans Cup:

Season	Round	Club	Home	Away	Aggregate
1974	Group Stage (Group A)	(Bulgaria) Akademik Sofia	1–2	0–6	3rd
1974	Group Stage (Group A)	(Romania) SC Bacău	2–2	0–2	3rd

== Players ==
=== Current squad ===
As of 23 September 2026

Note: Flags indicate national team as defined under FIFA eligibility rules; some limited exceptions apply. Players may hold more than one non-FIFA nationality.

No.	Pos.	Nation	Player
1	GK	ALB	Angelo Tafas
2	DF	TUR	Furkan Metin (on loan from Sarıyer)
3	DF	COL	Kevin Cuesta
5	DF	TUR	Ali Çırak
6	MF	TUR	Can Arda Yılmaz
7	FW	TUR	Erdem Can Polat
8	MF	TUR	Tolunay Artuç
9	FW	COL	Rodrigo Rivas
10	FW	PAR	Fernando Escobar
11	FW	TUR	Furkan Kaçmaz
13	GK	TUR	Orkun Özdemir
14	DF	TUR	Abdulsamet Kırım
15	MF	TUR	Burak Topçu
16	MF	TUR	Temel Çakmak
17	FW	TUR	Alptekin Çaylı
19	MF	PAR	Hosue Díaz (on loan from Libertad)
20	MF	TUR	Deniz Yıldız

No.	Pos.	Nation	Player
21	MF	TUR	Muhammed Mert
22	DF	TUR	Arda Saygı
23	MF	TUR	Zeki Dursun (on loan from Bursaspor)
24	DF	ARG	Juan Argüello
25	GK	TUR	Muhammet Özkan
27	DF	TUR	Uğurhan Uğurlu
32	DF	AZE	Elvin Yunuszade
35	FW	TUR	Ege Özkayımoğlu
50	DF	TUR	Bartu Göçmen
54	DF	TUR	Canberk Özdemir
64	DF	TUR	Ahmet Can Özdemir
67	MF	TUR	Bertu Özyürek
76	GK	TUR	Kaan Alp Dizbay
77	FW	TUR	Nurettin Korkmaz
80	MF	NGR	Emmanuel Aderinola
88	DF	TUR	Yusuf Can Esendemir
