= Sebastián Balmaceda =

Argentine footballer

Personal information
- Full name: Daniel Sebastián Balmaceda
- Date of birth: 8 October 1996 (age 30)
- Place of birth: Ituzaingó, Buenos Aires, Argentina
- Height: 1.67 m (5 ft 6 in)
- Position: Midfielder

Team information
- Current team: Juventud Unida

Senior career*
Years	Team	Apps	(Gls)
2016–2019	Tigre	3	(0)
2017–2018	→ Santamarina (loan)	1	(0)
2018–2019	→ Arsenal Sarandí (loan)	2	(0)
2019–2020	Sportivo Belgrano	15	(3)
2020–	Juventud Unida	42	(2)
- * Club domestic league appearances and goals as of 20:00, 14 May 2022 (UTC)

Daniel Sebastián Balmaceda (born 8 October 1996) is an Argentine footballer who plays for Juventud Unida.
