= 2019–20 Torneo Federal A =

VII Torneo Federal A
- Season: 2019–20
- Matches played: 322
- Goals scored: 651 (2.02 per match)
- Biggest home win: Sol de Mayo 5-0 Juventud Unida Universitario (September 15); Sportivo Peñarol 5-0 Sol de Mayo (November 3)
- Biggest away win: Cipolletti 0-5 Olimpo (February 23)
- Highest scoring: Central Norte 6-2 Boca Unidos (October 19)

The 2019–20 Argentine Torneo Federal A was the seventh season of the Torneo Federal A, the regionalised third tier of the Argentine football league system. The tournament is reserved for teams indirectly affiliated to the Asociación del Fútbol Argentino (AFA), while teams affiliated to AFA have to play the Primera B Metropolitana, which is the other third tier competition. The champions are promoted to Primera B Nacional. 30 teams competed in the league, 25 returning from the 2018–19 season, one team that was relegated from Primera B Nacional and four teams promoted from the Torneo Regional Federal Amateur. The regular season began on 1 September 2019 and was expected to end in June 2020.

Due to the COVID-19 pandemic, the Argentine Football Association suspended the tournament on 17 March 2020. On 28 April 2020 AFA announced the abandonment of the competition as well as the culmination of the 2019–20 season in all of its leagues, with no clubs promoted or relegated. AFA also announced that a decision on a suitable method for promotion from Torneo Federal A and the other lower tiers would be reached in due time.

== Format ==
=== First stage ===
The teams were divided into two zones with fifteen teams (a total of 30 teams) in each zone and it was played in a round-robin tournament whereby each team played each one of the other teams two times. The top six teams from each zone would qualify for the championship stage.

=== Championship stage ===
The teams that qualified from the first stage were divided into the same two zones with six teams each, also called Hexagonal Final, where they would be playing in a round-robin tournament whereby each team played each one of the other teams one time. The winner of each zone would be declared champion and automatically promoted to the Primera B Nacional. Also, the best second place team from the two zones would have qualified for a final match against a team from Primera B Metropolitana for a promotion to Primera B Nacional.

=== Relegation ===
After the first stage, the two bottom teams of each zone would be relegated to the Torneo Regional Federal Amateur, giving a total of four teams relegated.

== Club information ==
Locations of the 2019-20 season teams.
Blue: Zone A; Yellow: Zone B.

=== Zone A ===
Team	City	Stadium
Boca Unidos	Corrientes	José Antonio Romero Feris
Central Norte	Salta	Padre Ernesto Martearena
Chaco For Ever	Resistencia	Juan Alberto García
Crucero del Norte	Garupá	Andrés Guacurarí
Defensores	Pronunciamiento	Delio Cardozo
Defensores de Belgrano	Villa Ramallo	Salomón Boeseldín
Douglas Haig	Pergamino	Miguel Morales
Gimnasia y Esgrima	Concepción del Uruguay	Manuel y Ramón Núñez
Güemes	Santiago del Estero	Arturo Miranda
Juventud Unida	Gualeguaychú	De los Eucaliptos
San Martín	Formosa	17 De Octubre
Sarmiento	Resistencia	Centenario
Sportivo Belgrano	San Francisco	Oscar Boero
Sportivo Las Parejas	Las Parejas	Fortaleza del Lobo
Unión	Sunchales	La Fortaleza

=== Zone B ===
Team	City	Stadium
Cipolletti	Cipolletti	La Visera de Cemento
Círculo Deportivo	Comandante Nicanor Otamendi	Guillermo Trama
Camioneros	General Rodríguez	Hugo Moyano
Deportivo Madryn	Puerto Madryn	Coliseo del Golfo
Deportivo Maipú	Maipú	Higinio Sperdutti
Desamparados	San Juan	El Serpentario
Estudiantes	San Luis	Héctor Odicino – Pedro Benoza
Ferro Carril Oeste	General Pico	El Coloso del Barrio Talleres
Huracán Las Heras	Las Heras	General San Martín
Juventud Unida Universitario	San Luis	Mario Diez
Olimpo	Bahía Blanca	Roberto Natalio Carminatti
Sansinena	General Cerri	Luis Molina
Sol de Mayo	Viedma	Sol de Mayo
Sportivo Peñarol	Chimbas	Ramón Pablo Rojas
Villa Mitre	Bahía Blanca	El Fortín

== First stage ==
=== Zone A ===
Pos	Team	Pld	W	D	L	GF	GA	GD	Pts
1	Güemes	22	10	8	4	29	18	+11	38
2	Sarmiento (R)	21	9	9	3	22	14	+8	36
3	Chaco For Ever	21	10	5	6	26	19	+7	35
4	Sportivo Las Parejas	21	8	9	4	25	14	+11	33
5	Central Norte	22	8	8	6	30	22	+8	32
6	Defensores (P)	22	8	7	7	22	25	−3	31
7	Douglas Haig	22	8	7	7	24	28	−4	31
8	Defensores de Belgrano (VR)	22	7	8	7	20	18	+2	29
9	Crucero del Norte	21	7	8	6	20	20	0	29
10	Unión (S)	21	6	10	5	25	21	+4	28
11	Boca Unidos	21	7	5	9	27	34	−7	26
12	Juventud Unida (G)	21	5	7	9	17	23	−6	22
13	San Martín (F)	21	6	3	12	20	31	−11	21
14	Sportivo Belgrano	22	4	8	10	21	29	−8	20
15	Gimnasia y Esgrima (CdU)	22	4	6	12	16	28	−12	18

Source: AFA
Rules for classification: 1) points; 2) Head-to-head points; 3) Head-to-head goal difference; 4) Head-to-head goals scored; 5) Head-to-head away goals; 6) goal difference; 7) goals scored; 8) away goals scored; 9) draw of lots.

==== Results ====
Home \ Away	BOU	CNO	CFE	CRU	DPR	DEF	DOU	GYE	GÜE	JUG	SAF	SAR	SPB	SLP	UNS
Boca Unidos		1–1	2–0	0–0	—	2–1	1–2	1–4	2–1	2–1	1–1	—	2–1	—	1–2
Central Norte	6–2		—	1–0	1–2	1–1	1–0	—	0–0	2–0	4–0	0–0	0–1	1–1	—
Chaco For Ever	2–2	1–1		3–2	1–0	0–0	2–1	4–0	—	—	—	3–0	2–0	1–0	1–1
Crucero del Norte	1–0	—	0–2		2–0	0–0	1–2	2–1	2–2	2–2	1–2	—	1–0	—	0–0
Defensores (P)	2–1	1–4	—	0–1		1–0	—	1–0	1–1	0–0	2–2	0–0	4–1	—	3–2
Defensores de Belgrano (VR)	1–0	—	2–0	—	0–1		0–1	1–0	1–2	2–1	2–0	0–0	—	1–1	0–0
Douglas Haig	—	3–1	0–2	2–0	1–1	2–5		1–0	—	1–1	—	2–1	2–1	1–1	0–0
Gimnasia y Esgrima (CdU)	1–2	0–0	0–0	1–1	0–0	—	0–0		1–1	—	1–0	0–1	2–1	2–1	—
Güemes	—	2–1	3–0	—	—	2–0	3–1	1–0		3–0	1–0	1–1	2–0	0–1	0–2
Juventud Unida (G)	—	1–1	0–1	—	1–0	—	0–0	2–0	1–2		2–0	0–1	—	1–0	1–1
San Martín (F)	—	1–2	1–0	—	—	1–2	3–1	2–1	1–1	2–1		0–1	—	0–2	3–0
Sarmiento (R)	3–0	1–0	—	2–2	3–1	2–0	—	—	2–0	1–1	1–0		1–1	0–0	—
Sportivo Belgrano	2–2	—	2–1	0–1	1–2	1–1	3–0	—	1–1	0–1	2–1	—		0–0	2–2
Sportivo Las Parejas	2–1	3–0	—	0–0	0–0	0–0	—	3–1	—	2–0	3–0	3–1	0–0		—
Unión (S)	0–2	1–2	2–0	0–1	3–0	—	1–1	3–1	0–0	—	—	0–0	1–1	4–2	

Source: AFA
Legend: Blue = home team win; Yellow = draw; Red = away team win.

=== Zone B ===
Pos	Team	Pld	W	D	L	GF	GA	GD	Pts
1	Villa Mitre	22	10	9	3	21	9	+12	39
2	Deportivo Maipú	22	11	6	5	25	20	+5	39
3	Huracán Las Heras	22	8	11	3	17	14	+3	35
4	Deportivo Madryn	21	9	5	7	26	14	+12	32
5	Ferro Carril Oeste (GP)	21	7	10	4	21	19	+2	31
6	Juventud Unida Universitario	21	8	7	6	19	18	+1	31
7	Sansinena	22	8	7	7	18	20	−2	31
8	Olimpo	22	8	3	11	23	22	+1	27
9	Camioneros	22	5	10	7	18	21	−3	25
10	Estudiantes (SL)	21	7	4	10	19	24	−5	25
11	Cipolletti	22	5	10	7	25	31	−6	25
12	Círculo Deportivo	21	5	9	7	20	22	−2	24
13	Desamparados	21	5	9	7	16	21	−5	24
14	Sportivo Peñarol	21	5	7	9	20	20	0	22
15	Sol de Mayo	21	4	5	12	19	32	−13	17

Source: AFA
Rules for classification: 1) points; 2) Head-to-head points; 3) Head-to-head goal difference; 4) Head-to-head goals scored; 5) Head-to-head away goals; 6) goal difference; 7) goals scored; 8) away goals scored; 9) draw of lots.

==== Results ====
Home \ Away	CIP	CDE	DEP	DMA	DEM	DES	ESL	FCO	HLH	JUU	OLI	SAN	SOL	SPP	VMI
Cipolletti		—	2–1	1–0	1–2	—	2–1	1–1	0–1	1–1	0–5	2–3	2–0	2–2	—
Círculo Deportivo	0–0		2–0	2–1	—	2–2	—	—	1–1	1–1	1–0	0–1	0–2	2–1	0–0
Camioneros	—	1–1		2–1	0–1	1–0	2–0	1–1	1–1	0–1	0–0	1–0	3–2	—	—
Deportivo Madryn	2–1	—	0–0		3–0	—	0–1	2–0	0–0	4–1	—	—	2–0	1–0	0–0
Deportivo Maipú	—	2–2	—	1–4		3–0	2–1	0–1	0–0	—	1–0	2–0	3–0	1–0	1–1
Desamparados	0–0	3–1	2–1	1–1	1–1		—	—	2–2	0–1	—	2–0	1–1	0–2	0–1
Estudiantes (SL)	2–2	0–2	—	1–0	0–1	0–1		2–2	—	—	3–1	1–0	—	2–1	1–1
Ferro Carril Oeste (GP)	1–1	3–2	—	2–1	—	0–0	0–0		1–1	—	0–1	1–0	—	1–0	1–3
Huracán Las Heras	0–0	1–0	1–0	—	1–0	—	1–0	0–1		1–0	3–1	—	0–0	0–0	0–0
Juventud Unida Universitario	—	1–0	1–1	—	0–1	0–0	0–1	1–1	3–0		2–0	1–1	1–0	—	0–0
Olimpo	4–1	0–0	2–0	0–2	3–0	2–0	2–0	2–1	—	—		0–1	—	0–1	0–0
Sansinena	1–3	1–0	1–1	1–0	1–1	0–0	—	1–1	1–1	0–3	—		—	2–0	2–0
Sol de Mayo	1–1	1–1	2–2	—	1–2	0–1	2–0	0–2	—	5–0	1–0	0–1		—	1–3
Sportivo Peñarol	2–0	—	0–0	0–0	0–0	—	1–3	0–0	1–2	1–0	3–0	—	5–0		—
Villa Mitre	1–0	—	0–0	0–2	—	2–0	1–0	—	2–0	0–1	2–0	0–0	2–0	2–0	

Source: AFA
Legend: Blue = home team win; Yellow = draw; Red = away team win.

== Season statistics ==
=== Top scorers ===
As of March 15, 2020

Rank	Player	Club	Goals
1	(Argentina) David Romero	Güemes	12
2	(Argentina) Julio Cesar Cáceres	Chaco For Ever	10
3	(Argentina) Pablo Mazza	Douglas Haig	9
3	(Argentina) Cristian Ibarra	San Martín (F)	9
3	(Argentina) Damián De Hoyos	Juventud Unida Universitario	9
3	(Argentina) Gonzalo Cañete	Sarmiento (R)	9
3	(Argentina) Daniel Salvatierra	Sportivo Las Parejas	9

== See also ==
- 2019–20 Argentine Primera División
- 2019–20 Primera B Nacional
- 2019–20 Copa Argentina
