= Tobias Ballari =

Argentine professional footballer

Personal information
- Date of birth: 28 April 1995 (age 31)
- Place of birth: Río Ceballos, Argentina
- Height: 1.82 m (5 ft 11 1/2 in)
- Position: Midfielder

Team information
- Current team: Bogliasco

Youth career
- 2008–2015: Instituto

Senior career*
Years	Team	Apps	(Gls)
2015–2019	Instituto	11	(0)
2019–2021	Sportivo Belgrano	1	(0)
2021	Mazara		
2021–	Bogliasco		
- * Club domestic league appearances and goals as of 08:00, 15 April 2021 (UTC)

Tobias Ballari (born 28 April 1995) is an Argentine professional footballer who plays as a midfielder for Italian amateurs Bogliasco.

== Career ==
Ballari's career began with Instituto of Primera B Nacional in 2008. At senior level, he did not appear in 2015 or 2016, though was an unused substitute during the former for a fixture with Guaraní Antonio Franco. A 2–0 victory over Ferro Carril Oeste on 21 May 2017 saw Ballari make his professional bow, it was one of six appearances throughout the 2016–17 campaign; just one of which was a start, versus Boca Unidos in June 2017.

On 13 April 2021, he was announced by Eccellenza Sicily amateurs Mazara as their new signing. He then left Mazara for Promozione Liguria amateurs Bogliasco.

== Career statistics ==
As of 6 February 2019.

Club statistics
Club	Season	League			Cup		Continental		Other		Total	
Club	Season	Division	Apps	Goals	Apps	Goals	Apps	Goals	Apps	Goals	Apps	Goals
Instituto	2015	Primera B Nacional	0	0	0	0	—		0	0	0	0
Instituto	2016	Primera B Nacional	0	0	0	0	—		0	0	0	0
Instituto	2016–17	Primera B Nacional	6	0	0	0	—		0	0	6	0
Instituto	2017–18	Primera B Nacional	4	0	0	0	—		0	0	4	0
Instituto	2018–19	Primera B Nacional	0	0	0	0	—		0	0	0	0
Career total			10	0	0	0	—		0	0	10	0
