= Juan Cruz Argüello =

Argentine footballer

Personal information
- Date of birth: 19 April 2000 (age 26)
- Place of birth: El Tío, Argentina
- Height: 1.76 m (5 ft 9 in)
- Position: Right-back

Team information
- Current team: Boluspor
- Number: 24

Youth career
- 2006–2010: El Trébol de El Tío
- 2010–2019: Instituto

Senior career*
Years	Team	Apps	(Gls)
2019–2024	Instituto	7	(0)
2023–2024	→ Racing de Córdoba (loan)	45	(0)
2025	Defensores Unidos	32	(0)
2026	Real Tomayapo	5	(0)
2026–	Boluspor	5	(0)
- * Club domestic league appearances and goals as of 18 October 2026

Juan Cruz Argüello (born 19 April 2000) is an Argentinian professional footballer who plays as a right-back for Turkish TFF 1. Lig club Boluspor.

== Career ==
Argüello's youth career started with El Trébol de El Tío, playing for the club for four years from 2006. In 2010, Argüello joined the Instituto youth system. He made his first-team breakthrough in 2019 and was selected for his professional bow during a home defeat in Primera B Nacional to Central Córdoba, coming off the substitutes bench in place of Alan Aguirre on 29 March.

== Career statistics ==
As of 30 March 2019.

Appearances and goals by club, season and competition
Club	Season	League			Cup		Continental		Other		Total	
Club	Season	Division	Apps	Goals	Apps	Goals	Apps	Goals	Apps	Goals	Apps	Goals
Instituto	2018–19	Primera B Nacional	1	0	0	0	—		0	0	1	0
Career total			1	0	0	0	—		0	0	1	0
