= Enzo Bertero =

Argentine footballer (born 1996)

Personal information
- Full name: Enzo Bertero
- Date of birth: 31 May 1996 (age 30)
- Place of birth: Santa Fe, Argentina
- Position: Midfielder

Team information
- Current team: Sportivo Belgrano

Youth career
- Ben Hur

Senior career*
Years	Team	Apps	(Gls)
2013–2017	Ben Hur	25	(2)
2017–2019	Atlético de Rafaela	7	(0)
2019–	Sportivo Belgrano	0	(0)
- * Club domestic league appearances and goals as of 23:20, 3 September 2019 (UTC)

Enzo Bertero (born 31 May 1996) is an Argentine professional footballer who plays as a midfielder for Sportivo Belgrano.

== Career ==
Bertero began his career with Ben Hur, scoring two goals in twenty-five appearances in Torneo Argentino B and Torneo Federal B between 2013 and 2015. In 2017, Bertero signed for Atlético de Rafaela, with the midfielder being moved into the Primera B Nacional club's first-team squad during the 2018–19 campaign. He made his debut in August 2018 during a victory away to Lanús in the Copa Argentina. He was subsequently an unused sub for league fixtures with Quilmes and Brown, prior to making his bow in the second tier against Guillermo Brown on 7 October.

== Career statistics ==
As of 23 November 2018.

Club statistics
Club	Season	League			Cup (Note: Includes the Copa Argentina)		League Cup		Continental		Other		Total	
Club	Season	Division	Apps	Goals	Apps	Goals	Apps	Goals	Apps	Goals	Apps	Goals	Apps	Goals
Atlético de Rafaela	2017–18	Primera B Nacional	0	0	0	0	—		—		0	0	0	0
Atlético de Rafaela	2018–19	Primera B Nacional	1	0	0	0	—		—		0	0	1	0
Career total			1	0	0	0	—		—		0	0	1	0
