= Emiliano Endrizzi =

Argentine footballer

Personal information
- Full name: Jesús David Emiliano Endrizzi
- Date of birth: 7 March 1994 (age 32)
- Place of birth: Catamarca, Argentina
- Height: 1.83 m (6 ft 0 in)
- Position: Left-back

Team information
- Current team: Gimnasia Jujuy

Youth career
- San Lorenzo
- 2009–2013: Instituto

Senior career*
Years	Team	Apps	(Gls)
2013–2021	Instituto	187	(3)
2022	Independiente Rivadavia	33	(0)
2023–	Gimnasia Jujuy	106	(4)
- * Club domestic league appearances and goals as of 17:11, 28 April 2026 (UTC)

Jesús David Emiliano Endrizzi (born 7 March 1994) is an Argentine professional footballer who plays as a left-back for Gimnasia Jujuy.

== Career ==
Endrizzi, having joined their system in 2009 from San Lorenzo, was promoted into Instituto's senior team during the 2013–14 Primera B Nacional, making his bow in a 1–1 draw away to Boca Unidos on 25 August 2013. Nine further appearances followed that season, though just one was a start; versus Defensa y Justicia in December. The first goal of Endrizzi's career came against Estudiantes in June 2015, which was followed just under two years later with his 100th appearance in all competitions during a Primera B Nacional loss to Guillermo Brown on 10 May 2017.

== Career statistics ==
As of 7 February 2019.

Club statistics
Club	Season	League			Cup		Continental		Other		Total	
Club	Season	Division	Apps	Goals	Apps	Goals	Apps	Goals	Apps	Goals	Apps	Goals
Instituto	2013–14	Primera B Nacional	10	0	0	0	—		0	0	10	0
Instituto	2014	Primera B Nacional	10	0	1	0	—		0	0	11	0
Instituto	2015	Primera B Nacional	32	1	2	0	—		2 (Note: Appearance(s) in the Primera B Nacional play-offs)	0	36	1
Instituto	2016	Primera B Nacional	17	0	0	0	—		0	0	17	0
Instituto	2016–17	Primera B Nacional	39	1	1	0	—		0	0	40	1
Instituto	2017–18	Primera B Nacional	14	0	1	0	—		1	0	16	0
Instituto	2018–19	Primera B Nacional	11	1	0	0	—		0	0	11	1
Career total			133	3	5	0	—		3	0	141	3
