= Facundo Silva (footballer, born 1991) =

Argentinian footballer (born 1991)

Personal information
- Full name: Facundo Ezequiel Silva
- Date of birth: 19 January 1991 (age 35)
- Place of birth: La Plata, Argentina
- Height: 1.74 m (5 ft 8 1/2 in)
- Positions: Midfielder; winger

Team information
- Current team: Quilmes

Youth career
- Arsenal de Sarandí

Senior career*
Years	Team	Apps	(Gls)
2009–2011	Arsenal de Sarandí	16	(1)
2011–2016	Defensa y Justicia	20	(0)
2014	→ San Jorge (loan)	13	(7)
2014	→ San Martín T. (loan)	8	(1)
2015	→ Central Córdoba SdE (loan)	32	(2)
2016–2019	Godoy Cruz	29	(0)
2017–2018	→ Colón (loan)	8	(0)
2019	Los Andes	7	(0)
2019–2020	Instituto	15	(3)
2020–2021	Olimpo	8	(0)
2021–2022	Quilmes	13	(1)
- * Club domestic league appearances and goals as of 20:54, 25 July 2022 (UTC)

Facundo Ezequiel Silva (born 19 January 1991) is an Argentine former professional footballer who played as a midfielder or winger.

== Career ==
Silva began his footballing career in 2009 with Arsenal de Sarandí, making his debut in the Argentine Primera División in June 2009 during an away defeat to Huracán. Three league appearances later, Silva scored his first senior goal in a 1–1 draw against Argentinos Juniors on 23 November. In June 2011, Silva joined Defensa y Justicia of Primera B Nacional. He made a total of twenty appearances throughout his first two seasons with the club before leaving on loan twice in 2014 to join third tier sides San Jorge and San Martín. He scored seven goals in thirteen games for San Jorge, prior to one in eight for San Martín.

In January 2015, Silva signed for Central Córdoba. He made his debut in Primera B Nacional during a draw with Atlético Tucumán on 22 February. One further goal in thirty-one matches followed as Central Córdoba finished 15th in 2015. On 7 January 2016, Argentine Primera División side Godoy Cruz completed the permanent signing of Silva. Thirty appearances later, Silva was loaned out to fellow top-flight club Colón for the 2017–18 season. His debut arrived on 8 September 2017 versus former club Arsenal de Sarandí. January 2019 saw Silva move to Primera B Nacional's Los Andes.

== Career statistics ==
As of 15 January 2019.

Club statistics
Club	Season	League			Cup		Continental		Other		Total	
Club	Season	Division	Apps	Goals	Apps	Goals	Apps	Goals	Apps	Goals	Apps	Goals
Arsenal de Sarandí	2008–09	Primera División	2	0	0	0	0	0	0	0	2	0
Arsenal de Sarandí	2009–10	Primera División	9	1	0	0	—		0	0	9	1
Arsenal de Sarandí	2010–11	Primera División	5	0	0	0	—		0	0	5	0
Arsenal de Sarandí	Total		16	1	0	0	0	0	0	0	16	1
Defensa y Justicia	2011–12	Primera B Nacional	17	0	1	1	—		0	0	18	1
Defensa y Justicia	2012–13	Primera B Nacional	3	0	1	0	—		0	0	4	0
Defensa y Justicia	2013–14	Primera B Nacional	0	0	0	0	—		0	0	0	0
Defensa y Justicia	2014	Primera División	0	0	0	0	—		0	0	0	0
Defensa y Justicia	2015	Primera División	0	0	0	0	—		0	0	0	0
Defensa y Justicia	Total		20	0	2	1	—		0	0	22	1
San Jorge (loan)	2013–14	Torneo Argentino A	13	7	0	0	—		0	0	13	7
San Martín (loan)	2014	Torneo Federal A	8	1	2	2	—		0	0	10	3
Central Córdoba (loan)	2015	Primera B Nacional	32	2	0	0	—		0	0	32	2
Godoy Cruz	2016	Primera División	11	0	0	0	—		1 (Note: Appearance(s) in the Primera División play-offs)	0	12	0
Godoy Cruz	2016–17	Primera División	18	0	3	1	2 (Note: Appearance(s) in the Copa Libertadores)	0	0	0	23	1
Godoy Cruz	2017–18	Primera División	0	0	0	0	1	0	0	0	1	0
Godoy Cruz	2018–19	Primera División	0	0	0	0	0	0	0	0	0	0
Godoy Cruz	Total		29	0	0	0	3	0	1	0	33	0
Colón (loan)	2017–18	Primera División	8	0	0	0	1 (Note: Appearance(s) in the Copa Sudamericana)	0	0	0	9	0
Los Andes	2018–19	Primera B Nacional	0	0	0	0	—		0	0	0	0
Career total			126	11	7	4	4	0	1	0	138	15

== Personal life ==
Silva is a Cape Verdean Argentine.
