= Germán Estigarribia =

Argentine footballer

Personal information
- Full name: Germán Nicolás Estigarribia
- Date of birth: 6 March 1997 (age 29)
- Place of birth: Formosa, Argentina
- Height: 1.85 m (6 ft 1 in)
- Position: Forward

Team information
- Current team: Deportes Recoleta
- Number: 9

Youth career
- 2008–2017: Lanús

Senior career*
Years	Team	Apps	(Gls)
2017	Lanús	0	(0)
2017–2018	Deportes Antofagasta	10	(0)
2018	→ Deportes Copiapó (loan)	28	(10)
2019–2020	Instituto	16	(2)
2020–2021	Barracas Central	41	(7)
2022	Audax Italiano	24	(2)
2023	Deportes Temuco	29	(3)
2024–	Deportes Recoleta	5	(4)
- * Club domestic league appearances and goals as of 12 April 2024

Germán Nicolás Estigarribia (born 6 March 1997) is an Argentine footballer who plays as a forward for Chilean club Deportes Recoleta.

== Club career ==
Born in Formosa, Argentina, Estigarribia is a product of Lanús, where he came at the age of eleven. After taking part in friendlies for the first team, he moved to Chile in the second half of 2017 and signed with Deportes Antofagasta in the Chilean top division. The next year, he was loaned out to Deportes Copiapó.

Back in Argentina, he joined Instituto in the second half of 2019. The next year, he switched to Barracas Central.

In 2022, he returned to Chile and signed with Audax Italiano in the top level. The next season, he switched to Deportes Temuco.

In 2024, Estigarribia signed with Deportes Recoleta.

== International career ==
As a youth player from Lanús, he was a member of a preliminary squad of Argentina U17.
