= Juan Sills =

Argentine footballer

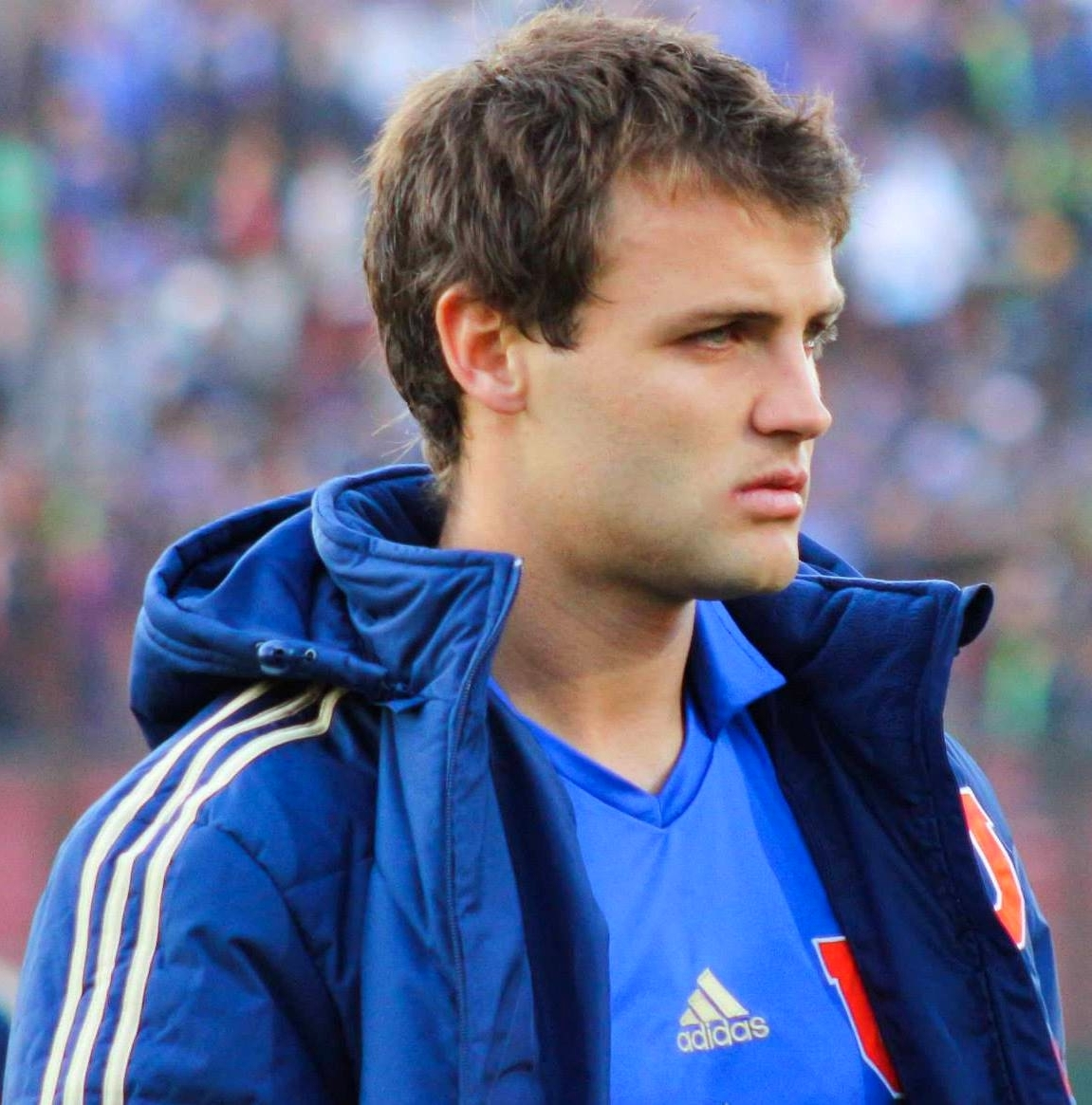
- Sills with Universidad de Chile in 2013

Personal information
- Full name: Juan Ignacio Sills
- Date of birth: April 5, 1987 (age 39)
- Place of birth: San Antonio de Areco, Argentina
- Height: 1.80 m (5 ft 11 in)
- Positions: Centre-back; right-back

Team information
- Current team: Agropecuario
- Number: 8

Youth career
- Vélez Sársfield

Senior career*
Years	Team	Apps	(Gls)
2008–2014	Vélez Sársfield	18	(0)
2008–2009	→ LD Alajuelense (loan)	27	(1)
2012	→ Instituto (loan)	19	(0)
2013–2014	→ Universidad de Chile (loan)	9	(2)
2014–2016	Olimpo	42	(2)
2016–2018	Newell's Old Boys	43	(0)
2019	Huracán	2	(0)
2019–2021	Instituto	26	(0)
2021	Ferro Carril Oeste	25	(0)
2022	Deportes Iquique	28	(0)
2023	Deportes Copiapó	25	(0)
2024	Aldosivi	29	(1)
2025–	Agropecuario	5	(0)
- * Club domestic league appearances and goals as of 19:03, 19 March 2025 (UTC)

Juan Ignacio Sills (born 4 May 1987) is an Argentine football defender who plays for Agropecuario.

== Career ==
Formed in Vélez Sársfield's youth divisions, Sills joined Costa Rican Primera División club LD Alajuelense on loan in 2008, before making any first team appearance with Vélez. He returned to his club in 2009.

Sills did his first pre-season training with Vélez' first team during July 2010. However, he suffered a knee cruciate ligament injury that made him miss the entire 2010 Apertura tournament.

For the first half of 2012, Sills played on loan for Instituto in the Primera B Nacional (Argentine second division), where he started in 21 games in his team's third-place finish. However, his team lost the promotion playoff to San Lorenzo and therefore could not achieve promotion to the Primera División. Upon his return to Vélez, he was part of the squad that won both the 2012 Inicial and 2012–13 Superfinal.

Sills then went on to play for Universidad de Chile and Olimpo.

In 2023, he played for Deportes Copiapó.

== Honours ==
Vélez Sársfield

- Argentine Primera División (3): 2011 Clausura, 2012 Inicial, 2012–13 Superfinal
