= Damián De Hoyos =

Argentine footballer

Personal information
- Full name: Carlos Damián De Hoyos
- Date of birth: 17 May 1988 (age 38)
- Place of birth: Mar del Plata, Argentina
- Height: 1.84 m (6 ft 0 in)
- Position: Striker

Team information
- Current team: Juventud Unida SL
- Number: 9

Senior career*
Years	Team	Apps	(Gls)
2008	Atlético Mar del Plata	–	(–)
2009–2010	Barracas Bolívar	32	(3)
2010	River Plate MdP	–	(–)
2011	Talleres MdP	–	(–)
2012–2015	Kimberley	61	(16)
2016–2018	Villa Mitre	47	(5)
2018–2019	Ferro General Pico	19	(5)
2019–2021	Juventud Unida SL	47	(22)
2022	Deportivo Maipú	26	(8)
2023	Santiago Morning	29	(9)
2024–	Juventud Unida SL	6	(1)
- * Club domestic league appearances and goals as of 10 May 2024

Carlos Damián De Hoyos (born 17 May 1988), known as Damián De Hoyos, is an Argentine footballer who plays as a striker for Juventud Unida Universitario.

== Club career ==
Born in Mar del Plata, Argentina, De Hoyos was not with any club at youth level, starting his career with Atlético Mar del Plata, Barracas Bolívar, River Plate and Talleres from Mar del Plata.

Still in his city of birth, De Hoyos joined Kimberley in 2012. He stayed with them until 2015 and became the team captain.

In February 2016, he signed with Villa Mitre. In August 2018, he switched to Ferro Carril Oeste from General Pico.

In July 2019, he joined Juventud Unida Universitario from San Luis and played for them until the end of 2021.

In 2022, De Hoyos signed with Deportivo Maipú in the Primera Nacional on a one-year deal.

In 2023, he moved abroad and signed with Chilean club Santiago Morning.

The next season, he returned to his homeland and rejoined Juventud Unida Universitario.

== Personal life ==
As a player of Kimberley, he was nicknamed La Garza (The Heron) due to his strides and speed.

At the same time he played football in Argentina, he worked for a sports warehouse until the age of 28.
