= Sebastián Navarro =

Argentine footballer

Personal information
- Full name: Sebastián Navarro
- Date of birth: 24 February 1988 (age 38)
- Place of birth: El Bolsón, Argentina
- Height: 1.77 m (5 ft 9 1/2 in)
- Position: Midfielder

Team information
- Current team: Boca Unidos

Senior career*
Years	Team	Apps	(Gls)
2009–2014	Talleres	39	(1)
2011–2012	→ Ferro Carril Oeste (loan)	32	(2)
2012–2013	→ Argentinos Juniors (loan)	14	(1)
2013–2014	→ Aldosivi (loan)	18	(0)
2014–2017	Ferro Carril Oeste	30	(2)
2015	→ San Martín (loan)	23	(0)
2016–2017	→ San Martín (loan)	8	(0)
2017	→ Aldosivi (loan)	10	(0)
2017–2018	Tristán Suárez	25	(3)
2018–2019	Instituto	22	(0)
2019–2020	All Boys	18	(0)
2020–2023	Independiente Rivadavia	65	(4)
2023–2024	Central Norte	32	(3)
2024–2025	Agropecuario	26	(2)
2025–	Boca Unidos	23	(4)
- * Club domestic league appearances and goals as of 17:08, 30 March 2026 (UTC)

Sebastián Darío Navarro (born 24 February 1988) is an Argentine professional footballer who plays as a midfielder for Boca Unidos.

== Career ==
Navarro's career got underway with Argentine club Talleres, he spent five years with them and made thirty-nine appearances. However, his time with Talleres was largely spent out on loan with Navarro joining three different teams in four years. In 2011, Navarro joined Ferro Carril Oeste of Primera B Nacional and subsequently played thirty-two times and scored two goals. A year later he signed for Argentine Primera División side Argentinos Juniors, making his top-flight debut on 25 August 2012 versus Godoy Cruz. A final loan move followed in 2013 as he agreed to join Primera B Nacional's Aldosivi.

He participated in eighteen league fixtures before returning to Talleres. Upon arriving back to Talleres, Navarro left the club permanently to join former loan team Ferro Carril Oeste. He made thirty appearances in his first two seasons with Ferro, but again found himself out on loan on three separate occasions. He had two spells with Primera División side San Martín, one in 2015 and one in 2016–17. For the second part of 2016–17, Navarro joined another one of his former teams, Aldosivi, on loan. He was selected in ten league matches for Aldosivi as the club were relegated to Primera B Nacional.

In September 2017, Navarro joined Tristán Suárez of Primera B Metropolitana on a free transfer. He scored his first goal for his new team on 4 October versus Atlanta. The 200th appearance of Navarro's career arrived on 10 March 2018 during a draw with Deportivo Español. Three months later, Primera B Nacional side Instituto completed the signing of Navarro.

== Career statistics ==
As of 5 September 2018.

Club statistics
Club	Season	League			Cup (Note: Includes the Copa Argentina)		League Cup		Continental (Note: Includes the Copa Sudamericana)		Other		Total	
Club	Season	Division	Apps	Goals	Apps	Goals	Apps	Goals	Apps	Goals	Apps	Goals	Apps	Goals
Talleres	2009–10	Torneo Argentino A	21	0	0	0	—		—		0	0	0	0
Talleres	2010–11	Torneo Argentino A	18	1	0	0	—		—		0	0	18	1
Talleres	2011–12	Torneo Argentino A	0	0	0	0	—		—		0	0	0	0
Talleres	2012–13	Torneo Argentino A	0	0	0	0	—		—		0	0	0	0
Talleres	2013–14	Primera B Nacional	0	0	0	0	—		—		0	0	0	0
Talleres	Total		39	1	0	0	—		—		0	0	39	1
Ferro Carril Oeste (loan)	2011–12	Primera B Nacional	32	2	1	0	—		—		0	0	33	2
Argentinos Juniors (loan)	2012–13	Primera División	14	1	1	0	—		0	0	0	0	15	1
Aldosivi (loan)	2013–14	Primera B Nacional	18	0	0	0	—		—		0	0	18	0
Ferro Carril Oeste	2014	Primera B Nacional	14	0	0	0	—		—		0	0	14	0
Ferro Carril Oeste	2015	Primera B Nacional	0	0	0	0	—		—		0	0	0	0
Ferro Carril Oeste	2016	Primera B Nacional	16	2	1	0	—		—		0	0	17	2
Ferro Carril Oeste	2016–17	Primera B Nacional	0	0	0	0	—		—		0	0	0	0
Ferro Carril Oeste	Total		30	2	1	0	—		—		0	0	31	2
San Martín (loan)	2015	Primera División	23	0	1	0	—		—		0	0	24	0
San Martín (loan)	2016–17	Primera División	8	0	0	0	—		—		0	0	8	0
San Martín (loan)	Total		31	0	1	0	—		—		0	0	32	0
Aldosivi (loan)	2016–17	Primera División	10	0	1	0	—		—		0	0	11	0
Tristán Suárez	2017–18	Primera B Metropolitana	25	3	0	0	—		—		0	0	25	3
Instituto	2018–19	Primera B Nacional	2	0	0	0	—		—		0	0	2	0
Career total			201	9	5	0	—		0	0	0	0	206	9
