= Catarina Taborda =

Bissau-Guinean politician

Catarina Rafael Mendonça Taborda (born 7 November 1989) is a Bissau-Guinean politician. She was Secretary of State for Tourism and Crafts under the government of Aristides Gomes.

She is a member of the Democratic Convergence Party. She served as Director General of Crafts, Director of Services for Promotion and Tourism Events, graduated in Commerce.
