= Ignacio Antonio =

Argentine professional footballer

Personal information
- Date of birth: 4 January 1995 (age 31)
- Place of birth: Rosario, Argentina
- Height: 1.73 m (5 ft 8 in)
- Position: Midfielder

Team information
- Current team: Gimnasia Mendoza

Youth career
- Juventud Unida de Villa Esther
- 2009–2014: Instituto

Senior career*
Years	Team	Apps	(Gls)
2014–2021	Instituto	119	(0)
2021–2022	Deportivo Maipú	29	(0)
2022–2023	San Martín SJ	28	(0)
2023–2026	Gimnasia Mendoza	98	(2)
2026–	Colón	4	(0)
- * Club domestic league appearances and goals as of 18:50, 20 March 2026 (UTC)

Ignacio Antonio (born 4 January 1995) is an Argentine professional footballer who plays as a midfielder for Colón.

== Career ==
Antonio was a part of Juventud Unida de Villa Esther's academy early in his youth career, which preceded him joining Instituto in 2009. He first appeared in senior football in May 2015, when Instituto selected him on the substitutes bench for a Copa Argentina win over Patronato. It was a competition he later made his debut in, against Arsenal de Sarandí on 23 July 2014 as they won 1–3 in La Punta. In the succeeding August, Antonio's bow in a professional league arrived versus Colón in Primera B Nacional. A total of eighty-four appearances occurred in his opening six seasons with Instituto.

== Career statistics ==
As of 6 February 2019.

Club statistics
Club	Season	League			Cup		Continental		Other		Total	
Club	Season	Division	Apps	Goals	Apps	Goals	Apps	Goals	Apps	Goals	Apps	Goals
Instituto	2013–14	Primera B Nacional	0	0	0	0	—		0	0	0	0
Instituto	2014	Primera B Nacional	6	0	2	0	—		0	0	8	0
Instituto	2015	Primera B Nacional	13	0	0	0	—		0	0	13	0
Instituto	2016	Primera B Nacional	11	0	1	0	—		0	0	12	0
Instituto	2016–17	Primera B Nacional	33	0	2	0	—		0	0	35	0
Instituto	2017–18	Primera B Nacional	15	0	0	0	—		1 (Note: Appearance(s) in the Primera B Nacional play-offs)	0	16	0
Instituto	2018–19	Primera B Nacional	6	0	0	0	—		0	0	6	0
Career total			84	0	5	0	—		1	0	90	0
