= Facundo Agüero =

Argentine footballer (born 1995)

Personal information
- Date of birth: 21 January 1995 (age 31)
- Place of birth: General Pico, Argentina
- Height: 1.89 m (6 ft 2 in)
- Position: Centre-back

Youth career
- Sportivo Independiente

Senior career*
Years	Team	Apps	(Gls)
2015–2020	Instituto	87	(3)
2020–2021	La Serena	39	(1)
2022	Unión Santa Fe	15	(1)
2023	Rosario Central	9	(0)
2024	Independiente Santa Fe	21	(0)
2025–2026	Tenerife	5	(0)
- * Club domestic league appearances and goals as of 9 June 2026

Facundo Agüero (born 21 January 1995) is an Argentine professional footballer who plays as a centre-back.

== Career ==
Agüero had a period in the youth of Sportivo Independiente, which preceded his move to Instituto. His first club at senior level became Instituto in 2015. Atlético Paraná were the opponents for Agüero's professional debut on 4 April 2015, with the defender playing the entirety of a 2–0 loss. After making twenty-eight appearances for them, his first goal arrived in September 2016 against Estudiantes at the Estadio Presidente Perón.

On 6 August 2025, Agüero signed a one-season contract with Spanish club Tenerife, recently relegated to Primera Federación.

== Personal life ==
Agüero's father, Roque, was also a professional footballer; for clubs such as Boca Juniors and Sarmiento.

== Career statistics ==
As of 5 February 2019.

Club statistics
Club	Season	League			Cup		Continental		Other		Total	
Club	Season	Division	Apps	Goals	Apps	Goals	Apps	Goals	Apps	Goals	Apps	Goals
Instituto	2015	Primera B Nacional	13	0	1	0	—		0	0	14	0
Instituto	2016	Primera B Nacional	12	0	2	0	—		0	0	14	0
Instituto	2016–17	Primera B Nacional	29	1	1	0	—		0	0	30	1
Instituto	2017–18	Primera B Nacional	1	0	0	0	—		0	0	1	0
Instituto	2018–19	Primera B Nacional	8	0	0	0	—		0	0	8	0
Career total			63	1	4	0	—		0	0	67	1
