= Gastón Yabale =

Argentine footballer

Personal information
- Date of birth: 30 September 1994 (age 32)
- Place of birth: Córdoba, Argentina
- Height: 1.85 m (6 ft 1 in)
- Position: Centre-back

Team information
- Current team: Gimnasia Jujuy

Youth career
- 2000–2002: Colegio La Salle
- 2002–2011: Deportivo Lasallano

Senior career*
Years	Team	Apps	(Gls)
2011–2015	Deportivo Lasallano		
2015–2020	Instituto	55	(1)
2020–	Gimnasia Jujuy	22	(2)
- * Club domestic league appearances and goals as of 18:25, 21 July 2022 (UTC)

Gastón Yabale (born 30 September 1994) is an Argentine professional footballer who plays as a centre-back for Gimnasia Jujuy.

== Career ==
Yabale joined the academy of Deportivo Lasallano in 2002, having signed from Colegio La Salle. He remained up until 2011 when he made his senior bow in Liga Cordobesa for the club. In 2015, Yabale signed with Instituto. Having been on the substitutes bench for a Copa Argentina loss to Gimnasia y Esgrima in August 2016, Yabale's debut subsequently arrived in September during a draw with San Martín in Primera B Nacional. He made thirty appearances in the 2016–17 season, which included his opening goal against Los Andes but also the first two red cards of his Instituto career versus Douglas Haig and Brown.

== Personal life ==
Yabale is the nephew of Armando Pérez, a former president of Belgrano who also worked within the AFA. Away from football, he studied at the Catholic University of Córdoba. In 2018, Yabale received a degree in business administration.

== Career statistics ==
As of 6 February 2019.

Club statistics
Club	Season	League			Cup		Continental		Other		Total	
Club	Season	Division	Apps	Goals	Apps	Goals	Apps	Goals	Apps	Goals	Apps	Goals
Instituto	2016–17	Primera B Nacional	30	1	0	0	—		0	0	30	1
Instituto	2017–18	Primera B Nacional	8	0	0	0	—		1 (Note: Appearance(s) in the Torneo Federal A play-offs)	0	9	0
Instituto	2018–19	Primera B Nacional	7	0	0	0	—		0	0	7	0
Career total			45	1	0	0	—		1	0	46	1
