= Martín Ferreyra =

Argentine footballer

Personal information
- Full name: Martín Ignacio Ferreyra
- Date of birth: 2 April 1996 (age 30)
- Place of birth: Bahía Blanca, Argentina
- Height: 1.90 m (6 ft 3 in)
- Position: Centre-back

Team information
- Current team: Olimpo

Senior career*
Years	Team	Apps	(Gls)
2017–	Olimpo	128	(15)
2023	→ Estudiantes BA (loan)	20	(0)
2024	→ Patronato (loan)	21	(1)
- * Club domestic league appearances and goals as of 16:25, 14 April 2026 (UTC)

Martín Ignacio Ferreyra (born 2 April 1996) is an Argentine professional footballer who plays as a defender for Olimpo.

== Career ==
Ferreyra began with Olimpo. He made his professional debut in the Primera División on 12 May 2018, featuring for the final thirteen minutes of the club's 2–2 home draw with Talleres; in what was his only appearance in 2017–18, which Olimpo ended with relegation. His first start arrived in their subsequent Primera B Nacional away opener against Brown in September 2018, with the defender receiving a straight red card in 3–0 loss. In the preceding July, Ferreyra scored his first goal in senior football against Aldosivi in the Copa Argentina.

== Career statistics ==
As of 1 March 2019.

Appearances and goals by club, season and competition
Club	Season	League			Cup		Continental		Other		Total	
Club	Season	Division	Apps	Goals	Apps	Goals	Apps	Goals	Apps	Goals	Apps	Goals
Olimpo	2017–18	Primera División	1	0	0	0	—		0	0	1	0
Olimpo	2018–19	Primera B Nacional	7	0	2	1	—		0	0	9	1
Career total			8	0	2	1	—		0	0	10	1
