= Mateo Bajamich =

Argentine footballer (born 1999)

Personal information
- Date of birth: 3 August 1999 (age 27)
- Place of birth: Morrison, Argentina
- Height: 1.78 m (5 ft 10 in)
- Position: Winger

Team information
- Current team: Estudiantes RC (on loan from Atlético Tucumán)
- Number: 32

Youth career
- Unión de Morrison
- 2016–2018: Instituto

Senior career*
Years	Team	Apps	(Gls)
2018–2020	Instituto	28	(10)
2020–2022	Houston Dynamo	9	(0)
2020–2021	→ Instituto (loan)	8	(2)
2022	→ Huracán (loan)	10	(0)
2023–2024	Estudiantes RC	37	(8)
2024–	Atlético Tucumán	67	(8)
2026–	→ Estudiantes RC (loan)	20	(1)
- * Club domestic league appearances and goals as of 17:46, 8 November 2026 (UTC)

Mateo Bajamich (Croatian: Bajamić, pronounced [matěo bǎjamitɕ]; born 3 August 1999) is an Argentine professional footballer who plays as a winger for Primera División side Estudiantes RC, on loan from Atlético Tucumán. He can also play as a striker.

== Career ==
=== Instituto ===
Bajamich's career started with Instituto Atlético Central Córdoba, joining in 2016 from his local club Unión de Morrison. Ahead of the 2018–19 Primera B Nacional season, Bajamich was promoted to the Instituto first team. He made his Instituto debut on 23 February 2019, coming on as a substitute in a 3–2 defeat to Nueva Chicago. Bajamich was a late addition to the match day squad after Facundo Affranchino was injured in the pre-match warm up. He had previously been an unused substitute in 2018 for matches with Villa Dálmine and Arsenal de Sarandí. Bajamich made his first start in senior football in a 1–0 loss against Guillermo Brown on 3 March 2019. On 21 April, he scored his first professional goal in the final match of the season in a 1–1 draw against Gimnasia y Esgrima (M). Bajamich and Instituto finished the 2018–19 season 22nd in the league table. After the season, he signed a contract with Instituto lasting until 2022.

Bajamich netted four goals in his first five games to start the 2019–20 season, including a brace in a 3–0 win at Brown de Adrogué on 14 September 2019. He scored twice again on 9 November in a 2–0 win against Santamarina. On 15 March Bajamich scored once to help La Gloria defeat Tigre 3–0. That would end up being the final game of the season for Instituto as the season was cancelled due to the COVID-19 pandemic. Bajamich ended the season with 9 goals and 3 assists from 21 games, helping Instituto finish 9th in group B.

=== Houston Dynamo ===
On 5 October 2020, Bajamich joined the Houston Dynamo of Major League Soccer. The transfer fee is reportedly $1,200,000, with Instituto receiving 20% of his next sale. The contract with Houston lasts until 2022, with the Dynamo having team options until 2025.

==== Instituto loan ====
On 9 November 2020, Bajamich was loaned back to Instituto until 21 January 2021, prior to the start of Houston's pre-season. He scored on his first appearance back, netting the opener in a 2–1 victory over Chacarita Juniors on 28 November. He scored again on 27 December in a 1–1 draw against Gimnasia y Esgrima (J). Bajamich made a total of eight appearances on loan, scoring twice, as Instituto lost in the first round of the promotion play-offs to Defensores de Belgrano.

==== Return to Houston ====
Bajamich made his Dynamo debut on 15 May 2021, coming off the bench in a 3–1 loss to the Colorado Rapids. He recorded his first assist for the Dynamo on 29 May in a 3–2 loss to Sporting Kansas City. Bajamich ended the season with 1 assist in 9 appearances, as Houston finished last in the Western Conference, missing out on the playoffs.

==== Loan to Huracán ====
On 28 January 2022, Bajamich was again loaned out by Houston. He returned to Argentina, joining Huracán on loan for the season with Huracán holding a purchase option. Bajamich made his debut for Huracán on 15 February, coming off the bench in a 3–2 loss to Estudiantes de la Plata in a Copa de la Liga Profesional match. Bajamich made 9 appearances while with Huracán, all in the Copa de La Liga Profesional.

On 7 November 2022, Houston declined Bajamich's contract option for 2023, making him a free agent.

=== Estudiantes de Río Cuarto ===
On 16 January 2023, Bajamich signed with Estudiantes de Río Cuarto in Primera Nacional. He made his debut for Estudiantes (RC) on 11 February, coming off the bench in a 2–0 loss to CA Temperley. On 17 February, Bajamich scored his first goal for el Celeste in a 2–2 draw with San Telmo. He ended the season with 8 goals in 38 appearances to help Estudiantes finish 4th in the league, plus 3 more appearances in the Copa Argentina where they reached the round of 16.

=== Atlético Tucumán ===
On 11 January 2024, Bajamich signed with Atlético Tucumán to return to the Primera División. He made his debut for El Decano on 25 January as a sub during a 1–1 draw with Rosario Central in the Copa de la Liga Profesional. His first goal for the club came on 31 March during a 1–1 draw against Independiente in the Copa de la Liga. He scored his first 2 career Primera División goals on 22 September in a 2–4 loss to Belgrano. Bajamich ended the season with 7 goals in 41 games across all competitions.

== Personal life ==
Born in Argentina, Bajamich is of Croatian descent. In 1921, his great-grandfather Mariano Bajamich (Croatian: Marin Bajamić) left Trnbusi, Croatia (then part of Yugoslavia) and moved to Argentina where he married a Spaniard named Carmen. Bajamich expressed his desire to play for the Croatia national team. In 2020, he received the Croatian citizenship.

== Career statistics ==
As of 2 February 2025

Appearances and goals by club, season and competition
Club	Season	League			National cup (Note: Includes Copa Argentina and US Open Cup)		League cup (Note: Includes MLS Cup Playoffs and Copa de la Liga Profesional)		Continental		Total	
Club	Season	Division	Apps	Goals	Apps	Goals	Apps	Goals	Apps	Goals	Apps	Goals
Instituto	2018–19	Primera B Nacional	7	1	0	0	—		—		7	1
Instituto	2019–20	Primera B Nacional	21	9	1	0	—		—		22	9
Instituto	Total		28	10	1	0	0	0	0	0	29	10
Houston Dynamo	2020	Major League Soccer	0	0	—		—		—		0	0
Houston Dynamo	2021	Major League Soccer	9	0	—		—		—		9	0
Houston Dynamo	Total		9	0	0	0	0	0	0	0	9	0
Instituto (loan)	2020	Primera Nacional	8	2	—		—		—		8	2
Huracán (loan)	2022	Argentine Primera División	0	0	0	0	9	0	—		9	0
Estudiantes (RC)	2023	Primera Nacional	38	8	3	0	—		—		41	8
Atlético Tucumán	2024	Argentine Primera División	27	3	1	1	13	3	—		41	7
Atlético Tucumán	2025	Argentine Primera División	2	0	0	0	—		—		2	0
Atlético Tucumán	Total		29	3	1	0	13	3	0	0	43	7
Career total			112	23	5	1	22	3	0	0	139	27
