= Germán Salort =

Argentine footballer

Personal information
- Full name: Germán Guillermo Salort
- Date of birth: 14 October 1988 (age 38)
- Place of birth: Córdoba, Argentina
- Height: 1.87 m (6 ft 2 in)
- Position: Goalkeeper

Team information
- Current team: Agropecuario

Youth career
- 1999–2011: Instituto

Senior career*
| Years | Team | Apps | (Gls) |
| 2011 | Unión Española | | |
| 2012 | General Paz Juniors | 3 | (0) |
| 2012–2014 | Central Norte | 5 | (0) |
| 2014 | Alumni | | |
| 2015 | Altos Hornos Zapla | 25 | (0) |
| 2016–2022 | Agropecuario | 63 | (0) |
| 2019–2020 | → Instituto (loan) | 15 | (0) |
| 2022–2023 | Chacarita Juniors | 4 | (0) |
| 2023 | Comunicaciones | 8 | (0) |
| 2023–2024 | Central Norte | 21 | (0) |
| 2024– | Agropecuario | 40 | (0) |
- * Club domestic league appearances and goals as of 17:21, 21 April 2026 (UTC)

Germán Guillermo Salort (born 14 October 1988) is an Argentine professional footballer who plays as a goalkeeper for Agropecuario.

== Career ==
Salort spent twelve years in the youth of Instituto, prior to signing for Chilean club Unión Española. In 2012, Salort joined General Paz Juniors of Torneo Argentino B. He was selected in three matches in 2011–12, prior to leaving the club months after signing to join Torneo Argentino A side Central Norte. Five appearances followed for Central Norte, notably his last on 8 April 2014 during a goalless draw with Juventud Antoniana. Two months later, on 30 June, Torneo Federal B's Alumni signed Salort. 2015 saw the goalkeeper make a move to Altos Hornos Zapla of Torneo Federal A. He played twenty-five times that year.

In January 2016, Salort agreed to sign for Agropecuario. The club won promotion in his first and second season, from Torneo Federal B to Primera B Nacional, with Salort playing thirty-five times whilst scoring his first two senior goals, he subsequently made his professional debut in Agropecuario's 2017–18 Primera B Nacional opener against Flandria on 24 September. Salort spent 2019–20 out on loan with Instituto.

Ahead of the 2022 season, Salort moved to Chacarita Juniors.

== Career statistics ==
As of 31 August 2020.

Club statistics
| Club | Season | League | | | Cup | | League Cup | | Continental | | Other | | Total | |
| Club | Season | Division | Apps | Goals | Apps | Goals | Apps | Goals | Apps | Goals | Apps | Goals | Apps | Goals |
|---|---|---|---|---|---|---|---|---|---|---|---|---|---|---|
| General Paz Juniors | 2011–12 | Torneo Argentino B | 3 | 0 | 0 | 0 | — | | — | | 0 | 0 | 3 | 0 |
| Central Norte | 2013–14 | Torneo Argentino A | 5 | 0 | 1 | 0 | — | | — | | 0 | 0 | 6 | 0 |
| Altos Hornos Zapla | 2015 | Torneo Federal A | 25 | 0 | 0 | 0 | — | | — | | 0 | 0 | 25 | 0 |
| Agropecuario | 2016 | Torneo Federal B | 14 | 2 | 0 | 0 | — | | — | | 0 | 0 | 14 | 2 |
| Agropecuario | 2016–17 | Torneo Federal A | 31 | 0 | 0 | 0 | — | | — | | 0 | 0 | 31 | 0 |
| Agropecuario | 2017–18 | Primera B Nacional | 17 | 0 | 0 | 0 | — | | — | | 1 (Note: One appearance in the 2017–18 Primera B Nacional play-offs) | 0 | 18 | 0 |
| Agropecuario | 2018–19 | Primera B Nacional | 0 | 0 | 0 | 0 | — | | — | | 0 | 0 | 0 | 0 |
| Agropecuario | 2019–20 | Primera B Nacional | 0 | 0 | 0 | 0 | — | | — | | 0 | 0 | 0 | 0 |
| Agropecuario | Total | | 62 | 2 | 0 | 0 | — | | — | | 1 | 0 | 63 | 2 |
| Instituto (loan) | 2019–20 | Primera B Nacional | 15 | 0 | 0 | 0 | — | | — | | 0 | 0 | 15 | 0 |
| Career total | | | 110 | 2 | 1 | 0 | — | | — | | 1 | 0 | 112 | 2 |

== Honours ==
Agropecuario

- Torneo Federal A: 2016–17
