= Leandro De Bortoli =

Argentine professional footballer

Personal information
- Date of birth: 3 August 1988 (age 38)
- Place of birth: Avellaneda, Argentina
- Height: 1.84 m (6 ft 1/2 in)
- Position: Goalkeeper

Team information
- Current team: Dock Sud

Senior career*
Years	Team	Apps	(Gls)
2012–2018	Temperley	18	(0)
2012–2013	→ Unión Mar del Plata (loan)	13	(0)
2018–2019	Instituto	2	(0)
2020–	Dock Sud	1	(0)
- * Club domestic league appearances and goals as of 18:43, 26 September 2020 (UTC)

Leandro De Bortoli (born 3 August 1988) is an Argentine professional footballer who plays as a goalkeeper for Dock Sud.

== Career ==
De Bortoli started his career with Temperley. For the 2012–13 season, De Bortoli was sent out on loan to Torneo Argentino A's Unión Mar del Plata. He made fifteen appearances for Unión Mar del Plata. He returned to Temperley in 2013 and was subsequently an unused substitute on twenty-three occasions, before making his professional debut in the Argentine Primera División, following back-to-back promotions, on 4 May 2015 against San Martín. After six seasons in the first-team, De Bortoli had featured seventeen times in all competitions. Instituto completed the signing of De Bortoli in July 2018.

After just two appearances for Instituto in one season, the goalkeeper departed at the end of his contract on 30 June 2019. On 29 February 2020, having been without a club since his release, De Bortoli joined Primera C Metropolitana's Dock Sud as an injury replacement for Juan Arias Navarro. He made his debut on 6 March in the Copa Argentina, as they eliminated Primera División outfit Unión Santa Fe on penalties; he saved two spot-kicks.

== Career statistics ==
As of 26 September 2020.

Club statistics
Club	Season	League			Cup		League Cup		Continental		Other		Total	
Club	Season	Division	Apps	Goals	Apps	Goals	Apps	Goals	Apps	Goals	Apps	Goals	Apps	Goals
Temperley	2012–13	Primera B Metropolitana	0	0	0	0	—		—		0	0	0	0
Temperley	2013–14	Primera B Metropolitana	7	0	0	0	—		—		0	0	7	0
Temperley	2014	Primera B Nacional	0	0	0	0	—		—		0	0	0	0
Temperley	2015	Primera División	1	0	0	0	—		—		0	0	1	0
Temperley	2016	Primera División	1	0	1	0	—		—		0	0	2	0
Temperley	2016–17	Primera División	6	0	1	0	—		—		0	0	7	0
Temperley	2017–18	Primera División	3	0	0	0	—		—		0	0	3	0
Temperley	Total		18	0	2	0	—		—		0	0	20	0
Unión Mar del Plata (loan)	2012–13	Torneo Argentino A	13	0	0	0	—		—		2 (Note: Appearance(s) in the Torneo Argentino A play-offs)	0	15	0
Instituto	2018–19	Primera B Nacional	2	0	0	0	—		—		0	0	2	0
Dock Sud	2019–20	Primera C Metropolitana	1	0	1	0	—		—		0	0	2	0
Career total			34	0	3	0	—		—		2	0	39	0
