= Franco Flores (footballer, born 1987) =

Argentine professional footballer

Personal information
- Full name: Franco Daniel Flores
- Date of birth: 9 July 1987 (age 39)
- Place of birth: La Rioja, Argentina
- Height: 1.68 m (5 ft 6 in)
- Position: Right-back

Team information
- Current team: Deportivo Madryn

Youth career
- Academia Ernesto Duchini
- Gimnasia LP

Senior career*
Years	Team	Apps	(Gls)
2005–2008	Gimnasia LP	0	(0)
2008–2009	Argentino	6	(0)
2009–2012	Gimnasia Concepción	76	(3)
2012–2013	Boca Unidos	24	(1)
2013–2014	Guillermo Brown	30	(4)
2014	Las Palmas	11	(1)
2015	Gimnasia y Tiro	18	(1)
2016–2017	Guillermo Brown	53	(0)
2017–2018	Villa Dálmine	24	(1)
2018–2020	Instituto	26	(0)
2020–2021	Mitre	4	(0)
2021	Villa Dálmine	7	(0)
2022–	Deportivo Madryn	10	(0)
- * Club domestic league appearances and goals as of 18:27, 4 September 2022 (UTC)

Franco Daniel Flores (born 9 July 1987) is an Argentine professional footballer who plays as a right-back for Deportivo Madryn.

== Career ==
Gimnasia y Esgrima of La Plata were Flores' opening senior career club, they had signed him from Academia Ernesto Duchini. He didn't appear in the Primera División but was a professional with them for three years. 2008 saw Flores join Argentino of Torneo Argentino B. Six appearances followed. Concepción del Uruguay's Gimnasia y Esgrima became his third employers in 2009, he went on to score three times - one in each of his three seasons - across seventy-six fixtures for the club. Boca Unidos (Primera B Nacional) and Guillermo Brown (Torneo Argentino A) stints subsequently occurred, along with five goals.

After spending the 2014 campaign in tier four with Las Palmas, Flores joined Gimnasia y Tiro in January 2015. Flores was sent off on his first start for Gimnasia y Tiro, prior to netting goals against Altos Hornos Zapla and Alvarado in the 2015 Torneo Federal A. Guillermo Brown of Primera B Nacional resigned Flores at the end of that season, with him remaining until August 2017 when he departed to sign for Villa Dálmine. Ten months later, Flores moved to fellow second-tier team Instituto. He made his debut on 31 August 2018 during a home defeat to Agropecuario. He'd leave after two seasons there.

Mitre became Flores' tenth different club in August 2020.

== Career statistics ==
As of 28 August 2020.

Club statistics
Club	Season	League			Cup		League Cup		Continental		Other		Total	
Club	Season	Division	Apps	Goals	Apps	Goals	Apps	Goals	Apps	Goals	Apps	Goals	Apps	Goals
Argentino	2008–09	Torneo Argentino B	6	0	0	0	—		—		0	0	6	0
Boca Unidos	2012–13	Primera B Nacional	24	1	1	0	—		—		0	0	25	1
Guillermo Brown	2013–14	Torneo Argentino A	30	4	0	0	—		—		1 (Note: Appearance(s) in the Torneo Argentino A play-offs)	0	31	4
Las Palmas	2014	Torneo Argentino B	11	1	0	0	—		—		0	0	11	1
Gimnasia y Tiro	2015	Torneo Federal A	18	1	0	0	—		—		6 (Note: Appearance(s) in the Torneo Federal A play-offs)	1	24	2
Guillermo Brown	2016	Primera B Nacional	17	0	0	0	—		—		0	0	17	0
Guillermo Brown	2016–17	Primera B Nacional	36	0	0	0	—		—		0	0	36	0
Guillermo Brown	Total		53	0	0	0	—		—		0	0	53	0
Villa Dálmine	2017–18	Primera B Nacional	24	1	0	0	—		—		1 (Note: Appearance(s) in the Primera B Nacional play-offs)	0	25	1
Instituto	2018–19	Primera B Nacional	8	0	0	0	—		—		0	0	8	0
Instituto	2019–20	Primera B Nacional	18	0	0	0	—		—		0	0	18	0
Instituto	Total		26	0	0	0	—		—		0	0	26	0
Mitre	2020–21	Primera B Nacional	0	0	0	0	—		—		0	0	0	0
Career total			193	8	1	0	—		—		7	1	201	9
