= Maternidade de São Paulo =

Hospital in Brazil

The São Paulo Maternity Hospital (in Brazilian Portuguese, Maternidade de São Paulo), was a hospital unit specializing in obstetrics in the city of São Paulo, Brazil. It was founded in 1894 by the physician Bráulio Gomes (1854-1903), it operated as a charity institution for 109 years, until it was deactivated on 15 September 2003.

== Founding ==
The Maternity was created as the Beneficent and Protective Association of Helpless Women (1894-1917), having as provider Francisca de Campos, wife of the then president of the State of São Paulo, Bernardino de Campos. It was the first maternity hospital in São Paulo, its name was later changed to Associação Beneficente das Mulheres Pobres (Beneficent Association of Poor Women), and later, Associação Maternidade de São Paulo.

== Services ==
In addition to taking care of women in advanced stages of pregnancy and care for childbirth and newborns, it also took care of women with sexually transmitted diseases, such as syphilis, a very prevalent infectious disease in its time, before the discovery of effective antibiotics.

Before the popularization of maternity hospitals, births were carried out at home by midwives and doctors were only called when the life of the mother or baby was in danger. The idea of hospital and maternity were still strongly linked to places of abandonment and death.

== Financial issues and closure ==
In the 1970s, the maternity hospital faced a serious financial crisis until its closure in 2003. In the 1990s, with the growth of the health insurance market, private patients began to look for other maternity hospitals and patients from the public health network were absorbed by the public hospitals through the SUS.

The establishment made a partnership with the medical cooperative Unimed in 1998, but it was not enough to normalize the revenue. The building and land were put up for auction and demolished in 2014 after being leased to a construction company.

With 14 floors, many notable people were there born, in the 1980s with 16 000 per year, among Ayrton Senna, Amyr Klink, Paulo Maluf, William Bonner, Susana Vieira, Nelson Motta, Cleiton Heringer Junior and many others.
