= Alan Aguirre =

Argentine footballer

Personal information
- Full name: Alan Maximiliano Aguirre
- Date of birth: 13 August 1993 (age 33)
- Place of birth: Buenos Aires, Argentina
- Height: 1.82 m (6 ft 0 in)
- Position: Centre back

Team information
- Current team: Agropecuario

Youth career
- Boca Juniors

Senior career*
Years	Team	Apps	(Gls)
2012–2016	Boca Juniors	1	(0)
2014–2016	→ Douglas Haig (loan)	52	(0)
2016	→ Ferro Carril Oeste (loan)	12	(0)
2016–2017	Sarmiento	10	(0)
2017–2019	Instituto ACC	34	(1)
2020–2023	Guayaquil City	49	(2)
2023–2024	Atlanta	26	(1)
2024–2026	Vinotinto	49	(0)
2026–	Agropecuario	6	(1)

International career
2012	Argentina U20	3	(0)
- * Club domestic league appearances and goals as of 17:29, 21 April 2026 (UTC)

Alan Maximiliano Aguirre (born 13 August 1993) is an Argentine footballer who plays as a centre back for Agropecuario.
