= Franco Canever =

Argentine footballer

Personal information
- Full name: Franco Nicolás Canever
- Date of birth: 17 September 1989 (age 37)
- Place of birth: Córdoba, Argentina
- Height: 1.75 m (5 ft 9 in)
- Position: Defender

Team information
- Current team: Güemes

Youth career
- –2008: Instituto

Senior career*
Years	Team	Apps	(Gls)
2008–2013	Instituto	95	(2)
2012	→ Argentinos Juniors (loan)	2	(0)
2013–2014	Atlético Tucumán	24	(0)
2014–2018	Aldosivi	104	(0)
2018–2020	Instituto	27	(0)
2020–	Güemes	11	(0)
- * Club domestic league appearances and goals as of 14:00, 15 August 2021 (UTC)

Franco Nicolás Canever (born 17 September 1989) is an Argentine professional footballer who plays as a defender for Club Atlético Güemes.

== Career ==
=== Club ===
Canever's first club was Primera B Nacional team Instituto, his spell with the club started in 2008 and ended in 2013. During his time with Instituto, he made 95 league appearances and scored 2 goals. In August 2012, Canever spent time away from Instituto as he joined Argentinos Juniors on loan for the 2012–13 Argentine Primera División season. However, his spell with Argentinos Juniors was short as on 8 January 2013, despite starting two of the club's first three league fixtures, he returned to his parent club in January 2013. He left Instituto in July of the same year and subsequently joined Atlético Tucumán, his Atlético Tucumán debut came on 4 August in a win against Gimnasia de Jujuy. 24 appearances in all competitions followed before he moved clubs once again, this time joining Aldosivi. He made his debut for the club on 9 August 2014 against Nueva Chicago.

== Career statistics ==
=== Club ===
As of 30 October 2016.

Club statistics
Club	Season	League			Cup (Note: Includes the Copa Argentina)		League Cup		Continental (Note: Includes the Copa Libertadores and Copa Sudamericana)		Other		Total	
Club	Season	Division	Apps	Goals	Apps	Goals	Apps	Goals	Apps	Goals	Apps	Goals	Apps	Goals
Aldosivi	2014	Primera División	22	0	0	0	—		—		0	0	22	0
Aldosivi	2015	Primera División	24	0	1	0	—		—		0	0	25	0
Aldosivi	2016	Primera División	11	0	1	0	—		—		0	0	12	0
Aldosivi	2016–17	Primera División	7	0	0	0	—		—		0	0	7	0
Aldosivi	Total		64	0	2	0	—		—		0	0	66	0
Career total			64	0	2	0	—		—		0	0	66	0
