= San Francisco, Argentina =

San Francisco
- City
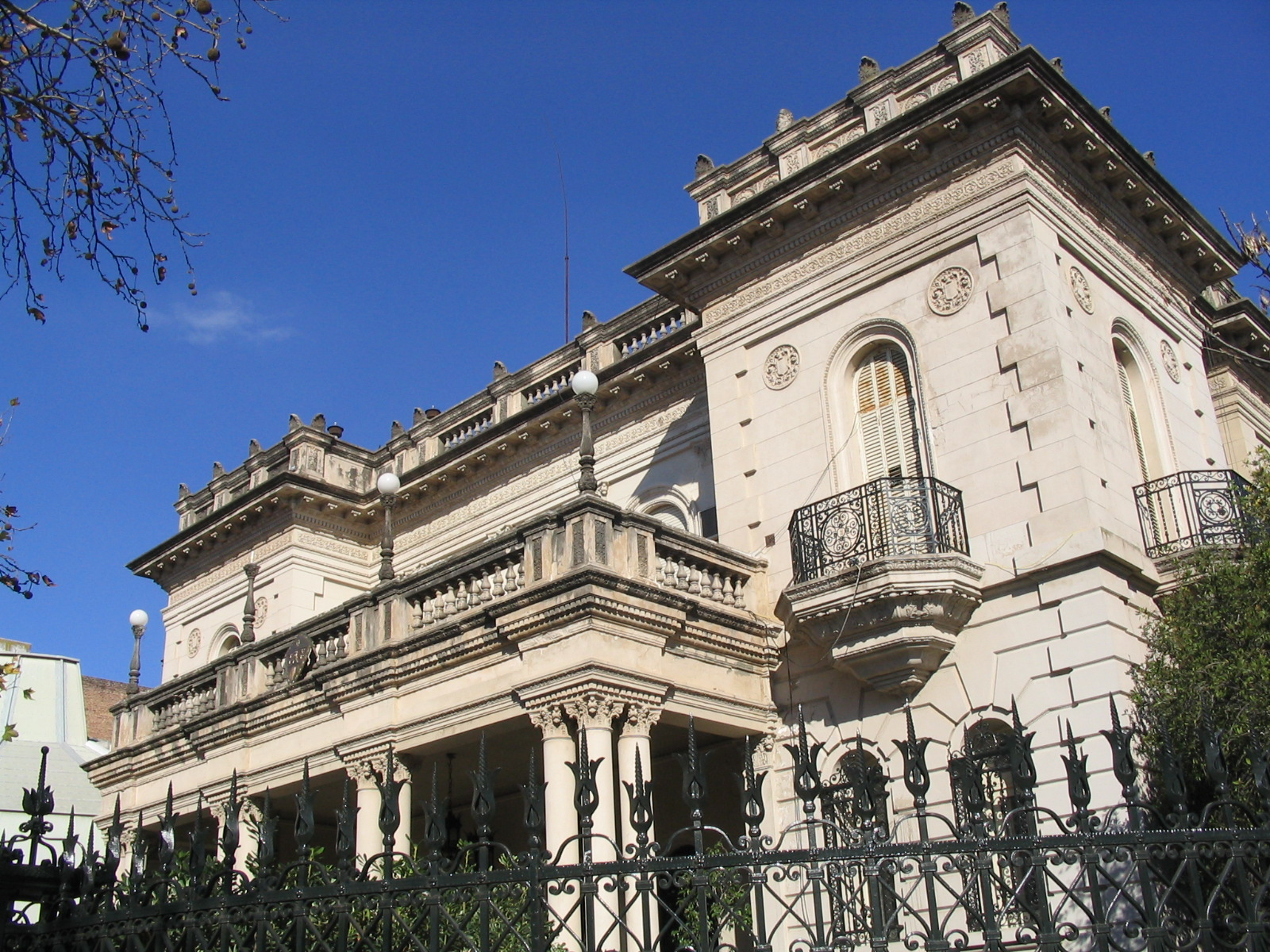
- San Francisco City Hall

- Location of San Francisco in Argentina San Francisco (Argentina)
- Coordinates: 31°26′08″S 62°4′17″W
- Country: Argentina
- Province: Córdoba
- Department: San Justo
- Founded: September 9, 1886

Government
  - Intendant: Damián Bernarte
- Elevation: 104 m (341 ft)

Population (2010 census)
  - Total: 61,750
- Time zone: UTC−3 (ART)
- CPA base: X2400
- Dialing code: +54 3564
- Website: Official website

San Francisco is a city located at the far east border of the province of Córdoba, Argentina, and parts of the city are beyond the border into the province of Santa Fe. In the city National Routes 19 and 158 intersect. It is the fourth most populated city in the province of Córdoba, with about 59,000 inhabitants, and the head city of the San Justo Department.

San Francisco is located on Cordoba and Santa Fe's provincial borders. The city is also located in a geographic depression. Frequently during the heavy summer rains the entire city floods with up to two feet of water that covers the city's streets. The city is centered on Plaza San Martin which is a large brick plaza used for a variety of demonstrations and festivals. Most of the city streets are laid cobble stone that have been polished black from traffic.

== History ==
The town was founded on 9 September 1886 by José Bernardo Iturraspe, as part of a colonization plan of the provincial government. The current location of the city is slightly south of the original settlement and dates from 1888. Around that same time railroads of the Córdoba Central Railway reached the area. The settlement was officially declared a city in 1915. A large portion of the city's population is made up of immigrants and World War I and II refugees from Europe, a large concentration of them being from the region of Piedmont, Italy.

San Francisco was without running water services until the 1940s. It was also at this time that the city was connected by Route 19 with the provincial capitals of Córdoba and Santa Fe. The old train tracks of the Central Córdoba Railway were removed in the 1960s from what had become the city center, which was modernized.

UN/LOCODE is ARSFO.

== Economy ==
San Francisco's economy is centered on agriculture. However, there are also many metal work factories that create electrical panels (WEG ), parts for cars (ZF SACHS ), and tolvas (AKRON ). Construction jobs and renovation projects make up the vast majority of jobs in San Francisco. Due to the high population of Italian immigrants there also exists several pasta factories. SanCor and Grupo Arcor both have factories near the city limits. SanCor is one of the leading dairy producers in Argentina (along with competitor La Serenísima). It holds one fifth of the total production in the country, and 90% of the Argentine exports of dairy products. It is a large cooperative made up many smaller ones, based on the Argentine "central milk basin" around the border between the provinces of Santa Fe and Córdoba. Grupo Arcor is a food company specialized in confectionery founded on July 5, 1951 in the city of Arroyito, Córdoba, Argentina. It is the first exporter of confectionery of Argentina, Brazil, Chile and Peru.

In 2005, Arcor had 31 manufacturing plants, with 27 in Argentina alone and the remaining spread among Brazil, Chile and Peru. It is one of the largest producers of candies worldwide and the largest producer of cookies in South America, with exports to over 117 countries.

== Notable people ==
San Francisco is the birthplace of:

- Domingo Cavallo, Former Ministry of Economy and presidential candidate.
- Mariano Puerta, tennis player
- Juan Pablo Francia, football player, FC Girondins de Bordeaux and Sportivo Belgrano
- Juan Roldan, professional boxer, three time world title challenger
- Gonzalo Taborda, former Argentine footballer
- Martín Llaryora, governor of Córdoba
- Sebastián Vignolo, sports journalist, commentator, and TV presenter

== Sources ==
- H.R.Stones, British Railways in Argentina 1860–1948, P.E.Waters & Associates, Bromley, Kent, England, 1993.
