= Sportivo Belgrano =

Argentine football club

- Full name: Sportivo Belgrano
- Nickname: Verde
- Founded: 15 April 1914; 112 years ago
- Ground: Estadio Oscar C.Boero, San Francisco, Córdoba; Córdoba Province, Argentina
- Capacity: 9,200
- Chairman: Rubén Boetto
- Manager: Sergio Maza
- League: Torneo Federal A
- 2018–19: 7°
- Website: http://www.sportivobelgrano.com/
Home colours	Away colours	Third colours

Sportivo Belgrano is an Argentine football club based in San Francisco, Córdoba. The team currently plays in the Primera B Nacional, the second division of the Argentine football league system.

== History ==
On 15 April 1914, a group of young people decided to establish a social club in the city of San Francisco, Córdoba. The name was chosen as a tribute to Manuel Belgrano, the creator of the flag of Argentina.

In 2008, during a match against Mendocino team Deportivo Maipú, several Sportivo Belgrano players and their coach Cristian Domizzi attacked referee Héctor Sosa. A disciplinary panel deducted 9 points from the club, costing them the chance of promotion. The verdict also banned Sperdutti from management for one year and several Belgrano players were suspended for 30 games. In addition, the disciplinary panel set a number of restrictions on the stadium, which included 3 home games of the 2008/09 season being played behind closed doors and five more games with limited tickets for sale.

In June 2013, the club secured promotion to play at Primera B Nacional after a 1–1 tie against Deportivo Santamarina at the playoff's second time (the first had ended 0–0).

== Current squad ==
As of 3 September 2019 Note: Flags indicate national team as defined under FIFA eligibility rules; some limited exceptions apply. Players may hold more than one non-FIFA nationality.

No.	Pos.	Nation	Player
—	GK	ARG	Leonardo Martina
—	GK	ARG	Fernando Vijande
—	DF	ARG	Daniel Abello
—	DF	ARG	Matías Barbero
—	DF	ARG	Cristian Belucci
—	DF	ARG	Braian Camisassa
—	DF	ARG	Jonathan Gallardo
—	DF	ARG	Pablo Mattalia
—	DF	ARG	Fernando Moreyra
—	DF	ARG	Mauro Orué
—	MF	ARG	Alex Aguirre
—	MF	ARG	Tobias Ballari
—	MF	ARG	Sebastián Balmaceda

No.	Pos.	Nation	Player
—	MF	ARG	Enzo Bertero
—	MF	ARG	Juan Capurro
—	MF	BRA	Walter De Souza
—	MF	ARG	Miguel Escobar
—	MF	ARG	Juan Pablo Francia
—	MF	ARG	Leonardo Lopez
—	MF	ARG	Tomas Rossi
—	FW	ARG	Marcelo Argüello
—	FW	ARG	Enzo Avaro
—	FW	ARG	Fernando Catube
—	FW	COL	Wilson Palacios
—	FW	ARG	Facundo Scocco
