= Boca Unidos =

- Full name: Club Atlético Boca Unidos
- Nicknames: Aurirrojo; El Club de la Ribera
- Founded: 27 July 1927; 99 years ago
- Ground: Estadio Leoncio Benítez
- Capacity: 17,500
- Chairman: Marcelo Insaurralde Benítez
- Manager: Matias Mazmud
- League: Torneo Federal A
- Website: www.clubbocaunidos.com
Home colours	Away colours	Third colours

Club Atlético Boca Unidos (mostly known simply as Boca Unidos) is an Argentine football and basketball club from Corrientes Province. The football squad currently plays in the Primera B Nacional, the second division of Argentine football league system.

At the end of the 2006–07 season, Boca Unidos was promoted from the Torneo Argentino B to the Torneo Argentino A via play-off. On 21 June 2009, they won another promotion which allowed it to play in the Primera B Nacional, where has remained since.

== Players ==
=== Current squad ===
Current squad of Boca Unidos as of 30 March 2026 (edit)
Sources: Soccerway

No.		Position	Player
—	ARG	GK	Luis Ojeda
—	ARG	GK	Federico Quijano
—	ARG	DF	Raúl Albornoz
—	ARG	DF	Julián Fuyana
—	ARG	DF	Pablo Moreyra
—	ARG	DF	Joaquín Sigel
—	ARG	DF	Lisandro Ramírez
—	ARG	DF	Gustavo Mbombaj
—	ARG	DF	Alejandro Leani
—	ARG	DF	Mateo De Olivera
—	ARG	DF	Santiago Pavón
—	ARG	DF	Yasir Olivares
—	ARG	DF	Bryan Mendoza
—	ARG	DF	Leandro Gómez
—	ARG	DF	Elías González
—	ARG	MF	Ataliva Schweizer
—	ARG	MF	Sebastián Navarro
—	ARG	MF	Ángel Piz

No.		Position	Player
—	ARG	MF	Martín Ojeda
—	ARG	MF	Diego Sánchez Paredes
—	ARG	MF	Ignacio Méndez
—	ARG	MF	Tiago Villanueva
—	ARG	MF	Esteban Orfano
—	ARG	MF	Claudio Alonso
—	ARG	MF	Saúl Abecasis
—	ARG	MF	Ramiro Schweizer
—	ARG	MF	Lautaro Ludueña
—	ARG	FW	Lucio Velazco
—	ARG	FW	Daniel Villalva
—	ARG	FW	Cristian Chávez
—	ARG	FW	Antonio Medina
—	ARG	FW	Maximiliano Osurak
—	ARG	FW	Agustín Alfano
—	VEN	FW	Andrés Rodríguez
—	ARG	FW	Lautaro Mendoza

Manager: Luca Batistuta

== Managers ==
- (Argentina) Luis Medero (2011–12)
- (Uruguay) Paolo Montero (2016–)

== Honours ==
- Torneo Argentino A (1): 2008–09
