= 2019–20 Club Atlético Temperley season =

Association football season

Temperley
2019–20 season
- President: Martín Vila
- Manager: Cristian Aldirico
- Stadium: Estadio Alfredo Beranger
- Top goalscorer: League: Lautaro Rinaldi (1); Enzo Baglivo; Mauro Guevgeozián; All: Lautaro Rinaldi (1); Enzo Baglivo; Mauro Guevgeozián

The 2019–20 season is Temperley's 2nd consecutive season in the second division of Argentine football, Primera B Nacional.

The season generally covers the period from 1 July 2019 to 30 June 2020.

== Review ==
=== Pre-season ===
Temperley started their pre-season preparations early, participating in their first exhibition match on 15 May 2019 against Primera División side Independiente; which they lost 3–0. Another friendly followed on 28 May, as they met the reserves of Racing Club; drawing the day's secondary encounter 2–2, though they did win the initial fixture thanks to a goal from Enzo Salas. 1 June saw Adrián Arregui agree a temporary departure away, as he headed to Colombia's Independiente Medellín on loan. Three days later, Josué Ayala completed a permanent transfer to Rosario Central; having been on loan in 2018–19. A third outgoing was confirmed on 12 June, as Lucas Mancinelli penned terms with Patronato. Also on that date, Temperley lost one-nil to Gimnasia y Esgrima (LP) Reserves.

Two transactions were announced on 14 June, with Alexis Vega (Brown) becoming Temperley's first signing while Leandro González went to Quilmes. Patricio Romero was loaned to Talleres on 18 June. During the following twenty-four hours, Lucas Baldunciel came from Gimnasia y Esgrima (M). Six incomings arrived across the succeeding ten days, as Cristian Aldirico received: Emanuel Ibáñez (Estudiantes (BA), Federico Crivelli (Boca Unidos), Matías Castro (Unión Santa Fe), Emiliano Ellacopulos (Instituto), Enzo Baglivo (UAI Urquiza) and Gonzalo Asis (Independiente). June concluded with friendlies with Gimnasia y Esgrima (LP)'s first-team, who came away undefeated. Signings nine/ten were revealed as Marcos Martinich and Nicolás Messiniti on 1/2 July.

Temperley faced Independiente for a second/third time in pre-season on 3 July, with the top-flight club getting the better of them again; winning 1–0 and 3–0. Days later saw Temperley play Aldosivi in non-competitive action, with both encounters ending in four-goal draws; sixteen-year-old Franco Ayunta netted in the opening game. Friendlies with Sportivo Italiano were staged on 10 July, with El Gasolero netting six goals across two wins. On that same day, Darío Salina headed off to San Telmo. The following week saw Julián Lucero, Brian Puntano, Pablo Magnín and Lucas Wilchez depart to Juventud Unida Universitario, Sportivo Las Parejas, Sarmiento and Almagro respectively. During which time, Fernando Alarcón and Mauro González signed with Temperley.

The club fought Comunicaciones in an exhibition match on 17 July; not long after a fixture with Estudiantes (LP) had been cancelled due to bad weather. Friendly outing number fifteen saw an encounter with Banfield Reserves set, with Temperley losing despite a goal from Emiliano Ellacopulos. Their next friendly brought a further match-up with Independiente, as they ended their losing streak versus El Rojo with a low-scoring tie. On 23 July, Federico Mazur joined Gimnasia y Esgrima (M). Fénix were played and defeated on 24 July in a pre-season meeting. Lautaro Rinaldi made a move in from Peruvian Primera División outfit Universidad San Martín on 25 July. Temperley ended July with Pablo Zalazar and Agustín Sosa leaving on loan to Sportivo Baradero and Talleres.

2 August saw Nicolás Muscio, Racing Club (loan), and Lucas Angelini, San Martín (B), join. The next three days allowed Temperley to schedule pre-season friendlies with upcoming league rivals Alvarado and Guillermo Brown, experiencing a win and a loss against each opponent. Cristian Paz signed for San Martín (SJ) on 8 August, a day prior to the cancellation of Temperley's friendly with Villa San Carlos.

=== August ===
Temperley got their Primera B Nacional campaign going on 16 August, falling to a three-goal defeat away to newly promoted Estudiantes (RC). They gained a point on matchday two versus Nueva Chicago on 24 August, as Lautaro Rinaldi netted on his home debut.

=== September ===
On 1 September, Temperley gained their first competitive victory of the season after beating Guillermo Brown one-nil away from home. 4 September saw them face Banfield's reserves for the second time in 2019–20, as they responded to July's loss with a 3–0 win. Temperley returned to league action against Alvarado on 7 September, drawing 0–0. They faced Belgrano five days later, losing 3–1.

== Squad ==
Squad No.	Nationality	Name	Position(s)	Date of birth (age)	Signed from
Goalkeepers
	Uruguay	Matías Castro	GK	24 October 1987 (age 39)	Unión Santa Fe
	Argentina	Federico Crivelli	GK	28 January 1982 (age 44)	Boca Unidos
	Argentina	Lautaro Maldonado	GK	5 December 2001 (age 24)	Academy
Defenders
	Argentina	Fernando Alarcón	CB	16 June 1994 (age 32)	Rosario Central (loan)
	Argentina	Lucas Angelini	LB	28 January 1995 (age 31)	San Martín (B)
	Argentina	Gonzalo Asis	RB	28 March 1996 (age 30)	Independiente (loan)
	Argentina	Enzo Baglivo	CB	13 January 1993 (age 33)	UAI Urquiza
	Argentina	Nicolás Demartini	CB	4 November 1999 (age 27)	Academy
	Argentina	Marcos Martinich	CB	8 August 1996 (age 30)	Rosario Central
	Argentina	Lucas Mulazzi	CB	27 September 1999 (age 27)	Academy
	Argentina	Sebastián Prieto	LB	9 April 1993 (age 33)	UAI Urquiza
	Argentina	Ezequiel Spinella	DF	23 October 1999 (age 27)	Academy
	Argentina	Alejo Toledo	DF	1 March 2000 (age 26)	Academy
Midfielders
	Argentina	Lucas Baldunciel	AM	22 March 1992 (age 34)	Gimnasia y Esgrima (M)
	Uruguay	Roberto Brum	CM	5 July 1983 (age 43)	Aldosivi
	Argentina	Mauro Cerutti	LM	29 March 1994 (age 32)	Independiente Rivadavia
	Argentina	Leonardo Di Lorenzo	CM	20 May 1981 (age 45)	Acassuso
	Argentina	Emiliano Ellacopulos	AM	14 January 1992 (age 34)	Instituto
	Argentina	Federico Fattori	AM	22 July 1992 (age 34)	Nueva Chicago
	Argentina	Mauro González	CM	31 August 1996 (age 30)	Almagro
	Argentina	Emanuel Ibáñez	MF	7 October 1993 (age 33)	Estudiantes (BA) (loan)
	Argentina	Nicolás Muscio	AM	18 February 1998 (age 28)	Racing Club (loan)
	Argentina	Agustín Tuffner	MF	27 May 1997 (age 29)	Academy
	Argentina	Alexis Vega	RM	1 May 1993 (age 33)	Brown
Forwards
	Argentina	Franco Ayunta	FW	29 November 2002 (age 23)	Academy
	Armenia	Mauro Guevgeozián	CF	10 May 1986 (age 40)	Gimnasia y Esgrima (LP)
	Argentina	Nicolás Messiniti	CF	21 February 1996 (age 30)	Independiente (loan)
	Argentina	Tobías Reinhart	FW	21 May 2000 (age 26)	Academy
	Argentina	Lautaro Rinaldi	CF	30 December 1993 (age 32)	Universidad San Martín
	Argentina	Ariel Rojas	FW	11 April 1993 (age 33)	Academy
	Argentina	Enzo Salas	FW	7 September 2000 (age 26)	Academy
	Argentina	Franco Sosa	CF	19 September 1999 (age 27)	Academy
	Argentina	Aaron Spagna	FW	2002	Academy
Out on loan					Loaned to
	Argentina	Adrián Arregui	DM	12 August 1992 (age 34)	Independiente Medellín
	Argentina	Patricio Romero	LB	24 March 1993 (age 33)	Talleres
	Argentina	Agustín Sosa	DF	29 August 2000 (age 26)	Talleres
	Argentina	Pablo Zalazar	DF	6 May 2000 (age 26)	Sportivo Baradero

== Transfers ==
Domestic transfer windows:
3 July 2019 to 24 September 2019
20 January 2020 to 19 February 2020.

=== Transfers in ===
Date from	Position	Nationality	Name	From	Ref.
3 July 2019 (Note: Deal agreed on 14 June 2019)	RM	Argentina	Alexis Vega	Brown	
3 July 2019 (Note: Deal agreed on 19 June 2019)	AM	Argentina	Lucas Baldunciel	Gimnasia y Esgrima (M)	
3 July 2019 (Note: Deal agreed on 22 June 2019)	GK	Argentina	Federico Crivelli	Boca Unidos	
3 July 2019 (Note: Deal agreed on 25 June 2019)	GK	Uruguay	Matías Castro	Unión Santa Fe	
3 July 2019 (Note: Deal agreed on 26 June 2019)	AM	Argentina	Emiliano Ellacopulos	Instituto	
3 July 2019 (Note: Deal agreed on 28 June 2019)	CB	Argentina	Enzo Baglivo	UAI Urquiza	
3 July 2019 (Note: Deal agreed on 1 July 2019)	CB	Argentina	Marcos Martinich	Rosario Central	
13 July 2019	CM	Argentina	Mauro González	Almagro	
25 July 2019	CF	Argentina	Lautaro Rinaldi	Universidad San Martín	
2 August 2019	LB	Argentina	Lucas Angelini	San Martín (B)	

=== Transfers out ===
Date from	Position	Nationality	Name	To	Ref.
3 July 2019 (Note: Deal agreed on 4 June 2019)	GK	Argentina	Josué Ayala	Rosario Central	
3 July 2019 (Note: Deal agreed on 12 June 2019)	RM	Argentina	Lucas Mancinelli	Patronato	
3 July 2019 (Note: Deal agreed on 14 June 2019)	CF	Argentina	Leandro González	Quilmes	
10 July 2019	CM	Argentina	Darío Salina	San Telmo	
11 July 2019	GK	Argentina	Julián Lucero	Juventud Unida Universitario	
12 July 2019	RW	Argentina	Brian Puntano	Sportivo Las Parejas	
15 July 2019	CF	Argentina	Pablo Magnín	Sarmiento	
16 July 2019	AM	Argentina	Lucas Wilchez	Almagro	
23 July 2019	RB	Argentina	Federico Mazur	Gimnasia y Esgrima (M)	
8 August 2019	CB	Argentina	Cristian Paz	San Martín (SJ)	

=== Loans in ===
Start date	Position	Nationality	Name	From	End date	Ref.
3 July 2019 (Note: Deal agreed on 21 June 2019)	MF	Argentina	Emanuel Ibáñez	Estudiantes (BA)	30 June 2020	
3 July 2019 (Note: Deal agreed on 29 June 2019)	RB	Argentina	Gonzalo Asis	Independiente	30 June 2020	
3 July 2019 (Note: Deal agreed on 2 July 2019)	CF	Argentina	Nicolás Messiniti	Independiente	30 June 2020	
12 July 2019	CB	Argentina	Fernando Alarcón	Rosario Central	30 June 2020	
2 August 2019	AM	Argentina	Nicolás Muscio	Racing Club	30 June 2020	

=== Loans out ===
Start date	Position	Nationality	Name	To	End date	Ref.
3 July 2019 (Note: Deal agreed on 18 June 2019)	LB	Argentina	Patricio Romero	Talleres	30 June 2020	
8 July 2019 (Note: Deal agreed on 1 June 2019)	DM	Argentina	Adrián Arregui	Independiente Medellín	30 June 2020	
25 July 2019	DF	Argentina	Pablo Zalazar	Sportivo Baradero	30 June 2020	
27 July 2019	DF	Argentina	Agustín Sosa	Talleres	30 June 2020	

== Friendlies ==
=== Pre-season ===
Temperley began their pre-season in mid-May, just two months after the conclusion of 2018–19. They met Independiente and Racing Club Reserves that month, prior to facing Gimnasia y Esgrima (LP) Reserves and Gimnasia y Esgrima (LP) (first-team) in June. July saw Temperley set friendlies with Independiente, Aldosivi, Sportivo Italiano, Estudiantes (LP), Comunicaciones, Banfield Reserves, Independiente and Fénix. Their final encounters were scheduled for August with Alvarado, Guillermo Brown and Villa San Carlos.

Win Draw Loss

15 May 2019 Friendly	Independiente	3–0	Temperley	Avellaneda, Argentina
	P. Pérez; C. Domínguez	InfoRegión		Stadium: Estadio Libertadores de América

28 May 2019 Friendly	Racing Club Reserves	0–1	Temperley	Sarandí, Argentina
		InfoRegión	E. Salas	Stadium: Predio Tita Mattiussi

28 May 2019 Friendly	Racing Club Reserves	2–2	Temperley	Sarandí, Argentina
	Goal	Temperley; InfoRegión	F. Vera	Stadium: Predio Tita Mattiussi

12 June 2019 Friendly	Gimnasia y Esgrima (LP) Reserves	1–0	Temperley	La Plata, Argentina
	Goal	Temperley; InfoRegión; 100 min. match		Stadium: Estancia Chica

29 June 2019 Friendly	Gimnasia y Esgrima (LP)	1–1	Temperley	La Plata, Argentina
	B. Mansilla	Gimnasia y Esgrima; 50 min. match	M. Cerutti	Stadium: Estadio Juan Carmelo Zerillo

29 June 2019 Friendly	Gimnasia y Esgrima (LP)	2–0	Temperley	La Plata, Argentina
	L. Chávez; M. Gómez	Gimnasia y Esgrima; 50 min. match		Stadium: Estadio Juan Carmelo Zerillo

3 July 2019 Friendly	Independiente	1–0	Temperley	Ezeiza, Argentina
	A. Franco	Temperley; Marca; 30 min. match		Stadium: Complejo Deportivo de Ezeiza

3 July 2019 Friendly	Independiente	3–0	Temperley	Ezeiza, Argentina
	M. Molina; F. Chávez; D. Mercado	Temperley; Marca; 30 min. match		Stadium: Complejo Deportivo de Ezeiza

6 July 2019 Friendly	Aldosivi	2–2	Temperley	Mar del Plata, Argentina
	N. Solís; J. Galeano	Temperley; La Capital MdP; 60 min. match	A. Vega 5'; F. Ayunta	Referee: Daniel Luján (Argentina)

6 July 2019 Friendly	Aldosivi	2–2	Temperley	Mar del Plata, Argentina
	F. Tobares; Y. Juárez	Temperley; La Capital MdP	N. Messiniti; T. Reinhart

10 July 2019 Friendly	Temperley	3–0	Sportivo Italiano	Buenos Aires, Argentina
	Alexis Vega (o.g.)	Temperley; Grupo La Provincia; 60 min. match		Stadium: Estadio Alfredo Beranger

10 July 2019 Friendly	Temperley	3–1	Sportivo Italiano	Buenos Aires, Argentina
	Franco Sosa; T. Reinhart	Temperley; Grupo La Provincia; 60 min. match	Goal	Stadium: Estadio Alfredo Beranger

13 July 2019 Friendly	Estudiantes (LP)	Cancelled	Temperley	City Bell, Argentina
		Temperley		Stadium: Country Club

17 July 2019 Friendly	Comunicaciones	0–0	Temperley	Buenos Aires, Argentina
		Temperley; Diario La Unión; 60 min. match		Stadium: Estadio Alfredo Ramos

17 July 2019 Friendly	Comunicaciones	0–1	Temperley	Buenos Aires, Argentina
		Temperley; Diario La Unión; 60 min. match	Q. Gaitán	Stadium: Estadio Alfredo Ramos

20 July 2019 Friendly	Banfield Reserves	3–1	Temperley	Luis Guillón, Argentina
	Goal	Temperley; InfoRegión	E. Ellacopulos	Stadium: Campo de Deportes Alfredo Palacios

21 July 2019 Friendly	Independiente	1–1	Temperley	Wilde, Argentina
	C. Chávez	Temperley; TyC Sports; 50 min. match	M. Guevgeozián	Stadium: Predio Villa Domínico

24 July 2019 Friendly	Temperley	2–0	Fénix	Buenos Aires, Argentina
	E. Baglivo; M. Guevgeozián	Temperley; InfoRegión		Stadium: Estadio Alfredo Beranger

3 August 2019 Friendly	Alvarado	0–1	Temperley	Ezeiza, Argentina
		Temperley; InfoRegión; 60 min. match	M. Guevgeozián	Stadium: Complejo Deportivo de Ezeiza

3 August 2019 Friendly	Alvarado	3–0	Temperley	Ezeiza, Argentina
	R. Giacomini; P. Vidal	Temperley; InfoRegión; 60 min. match		Stadium: Complejo Deportivo de Ezeiza

5 August 2019 Friendly	Guillermo Brown	3–0	Temperley	Ezeiza, Argentina
	J. Martínez; A. Méndez	Temperley; El Chubut; 70 min. match		Stadium: Complejo Deportivo de Ezeiza

5 August 2019 Friendly	Guillermo Brown	0–3	Temperley	Ezeiza, Argentina
		Temperley; El Chubut	K. Ceceri (o.g.); M. González; N. Messiniti	Stadium: Complejo Deportivo de Ezeiza

9 August 2019 Friendly	Temperley	Cancelled	Villa San Carlos	Lisandro Olmos, Argentina
		Temperley		Stadium: CN Sports

=== Mid-season ===
Temperley again met the reserves of Banfield for a friendly fixture in early September.

4 September 2019 Friendly	Banfield Reserves	0–3	Temperley	Luis Guillón, Argentina
		Temperley; Politica del Sur; 100 min. match	M. Guevgeozián; N. Messiniti; E. Ellacopulos	Stadium: Campo de Deportes Alfredo Palacios

== Competitions ==
=== Primera B Nacional ===
==== Results summary ====
Overall								Home						Away					
Pld	W	D	L	GF	GA	GD	Pts	W	D	L	GF	GA	GD	W	D	L	GF	GA	GD
5	1	2	2	3	7	−4	5	0	2	0	1	1	0	1	0	2	2	6	−4

Last updated: 14 September 2019.
Source: Soccerway

==== Matches ====
The fixtures for the 2019–20 league season were announced on 1 August 2019, with a new format of split zones being introduced. Temperley were drawn in Zone A.

Win Draw Loss

16 August 2019 1	Estudiantes (RC)	3–0	Temperley	Río Cuarto, Argentina
21:30 GMT-3	N. Foglia 22' (pen.); B. Sepúlveda 45+2', 54'	Temperley; Vía País; Soccerway		Stadium: Estadio Ciudad de Río Cuarto; Referee: Luis Lobo (Argentina)

24 August 2019 2	Temperley	1–1	Nueva Chicago	Buenos Aires, Argentina
13:05 GMT-3	L. Rinaldi 75'	Temperley; InfoRegión; Soccerway	L. Baima 87'	Stadium: Estadio Alfredo Beranger; Referee: Ramiro López (Argentina)

1 September 2019 3	Guillermo Brown	0–1	Temperley	Puerto Madryn, Argentina
15:00 GMT-3		Temperley; El Patagónico; Soccerway	E. Baglivo 65'	Stadium: Estadio Raúl Conti; Referee: Fabricio Llobet (Argentina)

7 September 2019 4	Temperley	0–0	Alvarado	Buenos Aires, Argentina
13:00 GMT-3		TyC Sports; Soccerway		Stadium: Estadio Alfredo Beranger; Referee: Héctor Paletta (Argentina)

12 September 2019 5	Belgrano	3–1	Temperley	Córdoba, Argentina
21:10 GMT-3	R. Noir 14'; P. Vegetti 46'; J. Novillo 83'	Vía País; Soccerway	M. Guevgeozián 90'	Stadium: El Gigante de Alberdi; Referee: Carlos Gariano (Argentina)

6	Temperley	–	Estudiantes (BA)	Buenos Aires, Argentina
				Stadium: Estadio Alfredo Beranger

== Squad statistics ==
=== Appearances and goals ===
No.	Pos.	Nationality	Name	League		Cup		League Cup		Continental		Other		Total		Discipline		Ref
No.	Pos.	Nationality	Name	Apps	Goals	Apps	Goals	Apps	Goals	Apps	Goals	Apps	Goals	Apps	Goals	Yellow card	Red card	Ref
–	GK	Uruguay	Matías Castro	5	0	—		—		—		0	0	5	0	0	0	
–	GK	Argentina	Federico Crivelli	0	0	—		—		—		0	0	0	0	0	0	
–	GK	Argentina	Lautaro Maldonado	0	0	—		—		—		0	0	0	0	0	0	
–	CB	Argentina	Fernando Alarcón	2	0	—		—		—		0	0	2	0	1	0	
–	LB	Argentina	Lucas Angelini	0	0	—		—		—		0	0	0	0	0	0	
–	RB	Argentina	Gonzalo Asis	5	0	—		—		—		0	0	5	0	1	0	
–	CB	Argentina	Enzo Baglivo	5	1	—		—		—		0	0	5	1	1	0	
–	CB	Argentina	Nicolás Demartini	4	0	—		—		—		0	0	4	0	1	0	
–	CB	Argentina	Marcos Martinich	0	0	—		—		—		0	0	0	0	0	0	
–	CB	Argentina	Lucas Mulazzi	0	0	—		—		—		0	0	0	0	0	0	
–	LB	Argentina	Sebastián Prieto	5	0	—		—		—		0	0	5	0	3	0	
–	LB	Argentina	Patricio Romero	0	0	—		—		—		0	0	0	0	0	0	
–	DF	Argentina	Agustín Sosa	0	0	—		—		—		0	0	0	0	0	0	
–	DF	Argentina	Ezequiel Spinella	0	0	—		—		—		0	0	0	0	0	0	
–	DF	Argentina	Alejo Toledo	0	0	—		—		—		0	0	0	0	0	0	
–	DF	Argentina	Pablo Zalazar	0	0	—		—		—		0	0	0	0	0	0	
–	DM	Argentina	Adrián Arregui	0	0	—		—		—		0	0	0	0	0	0	
–	AM	Argentina	Lucas Baldunciel	5	0	—		—		—		0	0	5	0	0	0	
–	CM	Uruguay	Roberto Brum	1(3)	0	—		—		—		0	0	1(3)	0	1	0	
–	LM	Argentina	Mauro Cerutti	3	0	—		—		—		0	0	3	0	0	0	
–	CM	Argentina	Leonardo Di Lorenzo	4	0	—		—		—		0	0	4	0	0	0	
–	AM	Argentina	Emiliano Ellacopulos	0(5)	0	—		—		—		0	0	0(5)	0	0	0	
–	AM	Argentina	Federico Fattori	5	0	—		—		—		0	0	5	0	1	0	
–	CM	Argentina	Mauro González	1(1)	0	—		—		—		0	0	1(1)	0	0	0	
–	MF	Argentina	Emanuel Ibáñez	1(1)	0	—		—		—		0	0	1(1)	0	0	0	
–	AM	Argentina	Nicolás Muscio	0	0	—		—		—		0	0	0	0	0	0	
–	MF	Argentina	Agustín Tuffner	0	0	—		—		—		0	0	0	0	0	0	
–	RM	Argentina	Alexis Vega	4(1)	0	—		—		—		0	0	4(1)	0	0	0	
–	FW	Argentina	Franco Ayunta	0	0	—		—		—		0	0	0	0	0	0	
–	CF	Armenia	Mauro Guevgeozián	5	1	—		—		—		0	0	5	1	0	0	
–	CF	Argentina	Nicolás Messiniti	0	0	—		—		—		0	0	0	0	0	0	
–	FW	Argentina	Tobías Reinhart	0	0	—		—		—		0	0	0	0	0	0	
–	CF	Argentina	Lautaro Rinaldi	0(4)	1	—		—		—		0	0	0(4)	1	0	0	
–	FW	Argentina	Ariel Rojas	0	0	—		—		—		0	0	0	0	0	0	
–	FW	Argentina	Enzo Salas	0	0	—		—		—		0	0	0	0	0	0	
–	CF	Argentina	Franco Sosa	0	0	—		—		—		0	0	0	0	0	0	
–	FW	Argentina	Aaron Spagna	0	0	—		—		—		0	0	0	0	0	0	
Own goals				—	0	—		—		—		—	0	—	0	—	—	—

Statistics accurate as of 14 September 2019.

=== Goalscorers ===
Rank	Pos	No.	Nat	Name	League	Cup	League Cup	Continental	Other	Total	Ref
1	CF	–	Argentina	Lautaro Rinaldi	1	—	—	—	0	1	
1	CB	–	Argentina	Enzo Baglivo	1	—	—	—	0	1	
1	CF	–	Armenia	Mauro Guevgeozián	1	—	—	—	0	1	
Own goals					0	—	—	—	0	0	
Totals					3	—	—	—	0	3	—
