= 2017–18 Superliga Argentina =

128th season of top-tier football league in Argentina

Superliga Argentina
- Season: 2017–18
- Dates: 25 August 2017 – 14 May 2018
- Champions: Boca Juniors (33rd title)
- Relegated: Temperley; Olimpo; Arsenal; Chacarita Juniors
- Copa Libertadores: Boca Juniors; Godoy Cruz; San Lorenzo; Huracán; Talleres (C); River Plate (via Copa Libertadores); Rosario Central (via Copa Argentina)
- Copa Sudamericana: Independiente; Racing; Defensa y Justicia; Unión; Colón; Argentinos Juniors
- Matches: 378
- Goals: 854 (2.26 per match)
- Top goalscorer: Santiago García (17 goals)
- Biggest home win: Rosario Central 5–0 Olimpo (Feb. 17, 2018); Racing 5–0 Patronato (Mar. 18, 2018)
- Biggest away win: San Lorenzo 0–5 Godoy Cruz (Apr. 8, 2018)
- Highest scoring: Defensa y Justicia 4–4 Gimnasia y Esgrima (LP) (Aug. 26, 2017)
- Longest winning run: Boca Juniors; 8 games
- Longest unbeaten run: Huracán; 12 games
- Longest winless run: Arsenal and Temperley; 12 games each
- Longest losing run: Gimnasia y Esgrima (LP); 6 games

The 2017–18 Superliga Argentina or Campeonato de Primera División Superliga 2017/2018 (officially the Superliga Quilmes Clásica for sponsorship reasons) was the 128th season of top-flight professional football in Argentina. The season began on 25 August 2017 and ended on 14 May 2018.

For the first time since 1893, the AFA did not organise the championship, now being administrated by the Superliga Argentina de Fútbol.

Twenty-eight teams competed in the league, twenty-six returning from the 2016–17 season and two promoted from the 2016–17 Primera B Nacional (Argentinos Juniors and Chacarita Juniors). Four teams (Aldosivi, Atlético de Rafaela, Quilmes and Sarmiento) were relegated to the Primera B Nacional Championship in the previous tournament.

Boca Juniors, who were the defending champions, won their thirty-third league title with one match to spare after a 2–2 draw against Gimnasia y Esgrima (LP) on 9 May 2018. As a result, Boca Juniors qualified for both the 2019 Copa Libertadores and the 2018 Supercopa Argentina.

== Competition format ==
The tournament was contested by 28 teams. Each team played the other 27 teams in a single round-robin tournament. The additional match against the main rival team in the so-called "Fecha de Clásicos" was not played in this season.

== Club information ==
=== Stadia and locations ===
Locations of the 2017–18 Argentine Primera División teams outside Greater Buenos Aires.
Locations of the 2017–18 Argentine Primera División teams within Greater Buenos Aires.

Club	City	Stadium	Capacity
Argentinos Juniors	Buenos Aires	Diego Armando Maradona	25,000
Arsenal	Sarandí	Julio Humberto Grondona	16,300
Atlético Tucumán	Tucumán	Monumental José Fierro	32,700
Banfield	Banfield	Florencio Solá	34,901
Belgrano	Córdoba	Julio César Villagra	28,000
Belgrano	Córdoba	Mario Alberto Kempes	57,000
Boca Juniors	Buenos Aires	Alberto J. Armando	49,000
Chacarita Juniors	Villa Maipú	Chacarita Juniors	25,000
Colón	Santa Fe	Brigadier General Estanislao López	40,000
Defensa y Justicia	Florencio Varela	Norberto "Tito" Tomaghello	12,000
Estudiantes (LP)	La Plata	Ciudad de La Plata	53,000
Gimnasia y Esgrima (LP)	La Plata	Juan Carmelo Zerillo	24,544
Godoy Cruz	Godoy Cruz	Malvinas Argentinas	40,268
Huracán	Buenos Aires	Tomás Adolfo Ducó	48,314
Independiente	Avellaneda	Libertadores de América	52,853
Lanús	Lanús	Ciudad de Lanús - Néstor Díaz Pérez	46,619
Newell's Old Boys	Rosario	Marcelo Bielsa	38,095
Olimpo	Bahía Blanca	Roberto Natalio Carminatti	20,000
Patronato	Paraná	Presbítero Bartolomé Grella	22,000
Racing	Avellaneda	Presidente Perón	55,389
River Plate	Buenos Aires	Monumental Antonio Vespucio Liberti	61,321
Rosario Central	Rosario	Dr. Lisandro de la Torre	41,654
San Lorenzo	Buenos Aires	Pedro Bidegain	39,494
San Martín (SJ)	San Juan	Ingeniero Hilario Sánchez	19,000
San Martín (SJ)	San Juan	Estadio del Bicentenario	25,286
Talleres (C)	Córdoba	Mario Alberto Kempes	57,000
Temperley	Temperley	Alfredo Beranger	13,800
Tigre	Victoria	José Dellagiovanna	26,282
Unión	Santa Fe	15 de Abril	22,852
Vélez Sarsfield	Buenos Aires	José Amalfitani	45,540

=== Personnel ===
Club	Manager	Kit manufacturer	Main sponsor
Argentinos Juniors	(Argentina) Alfredo Berti	Reusch	Autocrédito
Arsenal	(Argentina) Sergio Rondina	Lyon	None
Atlético Tucumán	(Argentina) Ricardo Zielinski	Umbro	Secco
Banfield	(Argentina) Julio César Falcioni	Penalty	Plan Chevrolet
Belgrano	(Argentina) Pablo Lavallén	Kappa	Tersuave
Boca Juniors	(Argentina) Guillermo Barros Schelotto	Nike	BBVA
Chacarita Juniors	(Argentina) Sebastián Pena	Macron	Autocrédito
Colón	(Argentina) Eduardo Domínguez	Burrda Sport	Secco
Defensa y Justicia	(Argentina) Juan Pablo Vojvoda	Lyon	Planes ESCO
Estudiantes (LP)	(Argentina) Leandro Benítez	Umbro	DirecTV Sports
Gimnasia y Esgrima (LP)	(Argentina) Darío Ortiz	Le Coq Sportif	None
Godoy Cruz	(Argentina) Diego Dabove	Macron	CATA Internacional
Huracán	(Argentina) Gustavo Alfaro	TBS	Banco Ciudad
Independiente	(Argentina) Ariel Holan	Puma	Correo OCA
Lanús	(Argentina) Ezequiel Carboni	Macron	Yamaha
Newell's Old Boys	(Argentina) Omar De Felippe	Adidas	Banco Municipal
Olimpo	(Argentina) Darío Bonjour	Macron	Bingo Bahía
Patronato	(Argentina) Juan Pablo Pumpido	Lyon	Nuevo Banco Entre Ríos
Racing	(Argentina) Eduardo Coudet	Kappa	RCA
River Plate	(Argentina) Marcelo Gallardo	Adidas	BBVA
Rosario Central	(Argentina) José Chamot	Nike	Banco Municipal
San Lorenzo	(Argentina) Claudio Biaggio	Nike	Banco Ciudad
San Martín (SJ)	(Argentina) Walter Coyette	Mitre	San Juan
Talleres (C)	(Argentina) Frank Darío Kudelka	Penalty	BBVA
Temperley	(Argentina) Gastón Esmerado	Lyon	Cetec Sudamericana
Tigre	(Argentina) Cristian Ledesma	Joma	Banco Macro
Unión	(Argentina) Leonardo Madelón	TBS	OSPAT
Vélez Sarsfield	(Argentina) Gabriel Heinze	Umbro	Hitachi

=== Managerial changes ===
Team	Outgoing manager	Manner of departure	Date of vacancy	Replaced by	Date of appointment
Pre-season changes
Gimnasia y Esgrima (LP)	(Argentina) Leandro Martini	Replaced	24 June 2017	(Argentina) Mariano Soso	26 June 2017
Estudiantes (LP)	(Argentina) Leandro Benítez	Replaced	27 June 2017	(Uruguay) Gustavo Matosas	28 June 2017
Newell's Old Boys	(Argentina) Juan Pablo Vojvoda	Replaced	27 June 2017	(Argentina) Juan Manuel Llop	28 June 2017
Defensa y Justicia	(Argentina) Sebastián Beccacece	End of contract	28 June 2017	(Argentina) Nelson Vivas	29 June 2017
Patronato	(Argentina) Rubén Forestello	End of contract	3 July 2017	(Argentina) Juan Pablo Pumpido	6 July 2017
Huracán	(Argentina) Juan Manuel Azconzábal	Sacked	4 July 2017	(Argentina) Gustavo Alfaro ^{1}	12 July 2017
Godoy Cruz	(Argentina) Lucas Bernardi	Sacked	5 July 2017	(Uruguay) Mauricio Larriera	12 July 2017
Unión	(Argentina) Eduardo Magnín	Replaced	6 July 2017	(Argentina) Leonardo Madelón	6 July 2017
Argentinos Juniors	(Argentina) Gabriel Heinze	End of contract	30 July 2017	(Argentina) Alfredo Berti	4 August 2017
Tournament changes
Estudiantes (LP)	(Uruguay) Gustavo Matosas	Resigned	19 September 2017	(Argentina) Lucas Bernardi ^{2}	26 September 2017
San Lorenzo	(Uruguay) Diego Aguirre	Resigned	22 September 2017	(Argentina) Claudio Biaggio ^{3}	23 September 2017
Defensa y Justicia	(Argentina) Nelson Vivas	Resigned	24 September 2017	(Argentina) Juan Pablo Vojvoda ^{4}	6 October 2017
Belgrano	(Argentina) Sebastián Méndez	Resigned	17 October 2017	(Argentina) Pablo Lavallén	23 October 2017
Olimpo	(Argentina) Mario Sciacqua	Resigned	17 October 2017	(Argentina) Rubén Forestello	19 October 2017
Temperley	(Argentina) Gustavo Álvarez	Resigned	5 November 2017	(Argentina) Gastón Esmerado	9 November 2017
Vélez Sarsfield	(Argentina) Omar De Felippe	Resigned	6 November 2017	(Argentina) Gabriel Heinze ^{5}	12 December 2017
Rosario Central	(Uruguay) Paolo Montero	Resigned	10 November 2017	(Argentina) Leonardo Fernández ^{3}	11 November 2017
Racing	(Argentina) Diego Cocca	Resigned	27 November 2017	(Argentina) Eduardo Coudet ^{6}	17 December 2017
Chacarita Juniors	(Argentina) Walter Coyette	Resigned	3 December 2017	(Argentina) Sebastián Pena ^{7}	16 December 2017
Lanús	(Argentina) Jorge Almirón	Resigned	4 December 2017	(Argentina) Ezequiel Carboni	6 December 2017
Godoy Cruz	(Uruguay) Mauricio Larriera	Resigned	5 December 2017	(Argentina) Diego Dabove	28 December 2017
Tigre	(Argentina) Ricardo Caruso Lombardi	Mutual agreement	8 December 2017	(Argentina) Cristian Ledesma	18 December 2017
Arsenal	(Argentina) Humberto Grondona	End of contract	9 December 2017	(Argentina) Sergio Rondina	15 December 2017
Olimpo	(Argentina) Rubén Forestello	Resigned	12 December 2017	(Argentina) Christian Bassedas	20 December 2017
Gimnasia y Esgrima (LP)	(Argentina) Mariano Soso	Resigned	28 December 2017	(Argentina) Facundo Sava	5 January 2018
Newell's Old Boys	(Argentina) Juan Manuel Llop	Sacked	19 February 2018	(Argentina) Omar De Felippe ^{8}	5 March 2018
San Martín (SJ)	(Argentina) Néstor Gorosito	Mutual agreement	17 March 2018	(Argentina) Walter Coyette	19 March 2018
Gimnasia y Esgrima (LP)	(Argentina) Facundo Sava	Mutual agreement	21 April 2018	(Argentina) Darío Ortiz ^{9}	22 April 2018
Rosario Central	(Argentina) Leonardo Fernández	Resigned	28 April 2018	(Argentina) José Chamot ^{10}	30 April 2018
Olimpo	(Argentina) Christian Bassedas	Mutual agreement	2 May 2018	(Argentina) Darío Bonjour ^{9}	2 May 2018
Estudiantes (LP)	(Argentina) Lucas Bernardi	Resigned	6 May 2018	(Argentina) Leandro Benítez ^{3}	6 May 2018

Interim Managers

1. (Argentina) Néstor Apuzzo was interim manager in the 2017 Copa Sudamericana second stage first leg.
2. (Argentina) Leandro Benítez was interim manager in the 4th round.
3. Interim manager, but later promoted to manager.
4. Manuel Fernández was interim manager in the 5th round and the 2016–17 Copa Argentina round of 16.
5. (Argentina) Marcelo Gómez was interim manager in the 9th–12th rounds.
6. (Argentina) Juan Ramón Fleita was interim manager in the 11th and 12th rounds.
7. (Argentina) Luis Marabotto was interim manager in the 12th round.
8. (Argentina) Fabián Garfagnoli was interim manager in the 17th and 18th rounds.
9. Interim manager until the end of the tournament.
10. Interim manager in the 26th and 27th rounds and the 2018 Copa Sudamericana first stage second leg.

=== Foreign players ===
Club	Player 1	Player 2	Player 3	Player 4	Player 5	Player 6
Argentinos Juniors	(Uruguay) Javier Cabrera	(Peru) Beto da Silva	(Colombia) Juan Camilo Saiz	(Uruguay) Jonathan Sandoval		
Arsenal	(Uruguay) Diego Chaves	(Uruguay) Gonzalo González	(Uruguay) Rodrigo Pollero			
Atlético Tucumán	(Uruguay) Mauricio Affonso	(Uruguay) Gonzalo Freitas	(Uruguay) Rafael García	(Uruguay) Andrés Lamas		
Banfield	(Colombia) Iván Arboleda	(Paraguay) Danilo Ortiz				
Belgrano	(Paraguay) Epifanio García	(Armenia) Mauro Guevgeozián	(Uruguay) Santiago Martínez	(Uruguay) Jonathan Ramis	(Peru) Hansell Riojas	
Boca Juniors	(Colombia) Wílmar Barrios	(Colombia) Edwin Cardona	(Colombia) Frank Fabra	(Uruguay) Nahitan Nández	(Colombia) Sebastián Pérez	
Chacarita Juniors	(Uruguay) Hernán Petryk	(Uruguay) Facundo Rodriguez				
Colón	(Ecuador) Alexander Domínguez	(Paraguay) Marcelo Estigarribia	(Uruguay) Diego Vera			
Defensa y Justicia	(Uruguay) Christian Almeida					
Estudiantes (LP)	(Ecuador) Christian Alemán	(Colombia) Andrés Ramiro Escobar	(Ecuador) Jacob Murillo	(Colombia) Juan Ferney Otero		
Gimnasia y Esgrima (LP)	(Paraguay) Omar Alderete	(Uruguay) Brahian Alemán	(Uruguay) Nicolás Dibble			
Godoy Cruz	(Paraguay) Cristian Báez	(Uruguay) Leonardo Burián	(Uruguay) Santiago García	(Uruguay) Diego Riolfo	(Uruguay) Felipe Rodríguez	(Paraguay) Diego Viera
Huracán	(Paraguay) Saúl Salcedo					
Independiente	(Venezuela) Fernando Amorebieta	(Uruguay) Martín Campaña	(Ecuador) Fernando Gaibor	(Uruguay) Diego Rodríguez	(Uruguay) Gastón Silva	
Lanús	(Paraguay) Rolando García Guerreño	(Paraguay) Matías Rojas				
Newell's Old Boys	(São Tomé and Príncipe) Luís Leal					
Olimpo	(Venezuela) Michael Covea	(Uruguay) Gonzalo Porras	(Uruguay) Renzo Ramírez	(Uruguay) Emiliano Tellechea		
Patronato	(Uruguay) Adrián Balboa	(Paraguay) Blas Cáceres	(Paraguay) Alberto Contrera	(Venezuela) Darwin González	(Uruguay) Sebastián Ribas	
Racing						
River Plate	(Colombia) Rafael Santos Borré	(Uruguay) Nicolás de la Cruz	(Paraguay) Jorge Moreira	(Colombia) Juan Fernando Quintero	(Uruguay) Marcelo Saracchi	
Rosario Central	(Colombia) Óscar Cabezas	(Uruguay) Washington Camacho	(Chile) Alfonso Parot			
San Lorenzo	(Chile) Paulo Díaz	(Paraguay) Robert Piris Da Motta				
San Martín (SJ)	(Uruguay) Facundo Barceló	(Uruguay) Camilo Cándido	(Uruguay) Álvaro Fernández	(Uruguay) Maxi Rodríguez		
Talleres (C)	(Uruguay) Junior Arias	(Uruguay) Lucas Olaza	(Ecuador) Joao Rojas	(Uruguay) Santiago Silva	(Venezuela) Samuel Sosa	
Temperley	(Paraguay) Williams Riveros	(Paraguay) Mathías Villasanti				
Tigre	(Uruguay) Mathías Abero	(Uruguay) Carlos Rodríguez				
Unión	(Uruguay) Matías Castro	(Colombia) Yeimar Gómez	(Uruguay) Guillermo Méndez	(Paraguay) José Ariel Núñez	(Uruguay) Diego Zabala	
Vélez Sarsfield	(Peru) Luis Abram	(Paraguay) Luis Amarilla				

==== Players holding Argentinian dual nationality ====
- (Paraguay) Lucas Barrios (Argentinos Juniors)
- (Switzerland) Dylan Gissi (Defensa y Justicia)
- (Slovakia) David Depetris (Olimpo)
- (Uruguay) Camilo Mayada (River Plate)
- (Uruguay) Rodrigo Mora (River Plate)
- (Chile) Marcelo Larrondo (River Plate)
- (Paraguay) Néstor Ortigoza (Rosario Central)
- (United States) Joel Soñora (Talleres (C))

== League table ==
Pos	Team	Pld	W	D	L	GF	GA	GD	Pts	Qualification
1	Boca Juniors (C)	27	18	4	5	50	22	+28	58	Qualification for Copa Libertadores group stage
2	Godoy Cruz	27	17	5	5	45	24	+21	56	Qualification for Copa Libertadores group stage
3	San Lorenzo	27	14	8	5	31	20	+11	50	Qualification for Copa Libertadores group stage
4	Huracán	27	13	9	5	35	24	+11	48	Qualification for Copa Libertadores group stage
5	Talleres (C)	27	13	7	7	33	20	+13	46	Qualification for Copa Libertadores second stage
6	Independiente	27	13	7	7	29	19	+10	46	Qualification for Copa Sudamericana first stage
7	Racing	27	13	6	8	46	32	+14	45	Qualification for Copa Sudamericana first stage
8	River Plate	27	13	6	8	39	26	+13	45	Qualification for Copa Libertadores group stage (Note: River Plate qualified for the Copa Libertadores group stage by winning the 2018 Copa Libertadores.)
9	Defensa y Justicia	27	13	5	9	41	34	+7	44	Qualification for Copa Sudamericana first stage
10	Unión	27	11	10	6	33	23	+10	43	Qualification for Copa Sudamericana first stage
11	Colón	27	11	8	8	32	22	+10	41	Qualification for Copa Sudamericana first stage
12	Argentinos Juniors	27	12	5	10	36	30	+6	41	Qualification for Copa Sudamericana first stage
13	Belgrano	27	10	10	7	29	28	+1	40	
14	Vélez Sarsfield	27	10	8	9	31	32	−1	38	
15	Atlético Tucumán	27	8	12	7	29	26	+3	36	
16	Estudiantes (LP)	27	10	6	11	25	26	−1	36	
17	Banfield	27	9	8	10	27	24	+3	35	
18	San Martín (SJ)	27	9	6	12	30	36	−6	33	
19	Patronato	27	8	9	10	26	32	−6	33	
20	Rosario Central	27	8	8	11	30	41	−11	32	Qualification for Copa Libertadores group stage (Note: Rosario Central qualified for the Copa Libertadores group stage by winning the 2017–18 Copa Argentina.)
21	Newell's Old Boys (Note: Newell's Old Boys were deducted one point for debts owed to former players. Originally AFA partially accepted the appeal by Newell's Old Boys reducing the penalty from three points to one point but a new appeal by Lanús overturned the decision. Finally, on 28 June 2019 CAS gave back two points to Newell´s Old Boys reducing the penalty to one point again.)	27	8	6	13	23	28	−5	29	
22	Lanús	27	6	11	10	20	37	−17	29	
23	Gimnasia y Esgrima (LP)	27	7	6	14	28	43	−15	27	
24	Tigre	27	4	12	11	26	33	−7	24	
25	Temperley	27	5	8	14	22	46	−24	23	
26	Chacarita Juniors	27	4	6	17	23	40	−17	18	
27	Arsenal	27	3	8	16	19	36	−17	17	
28	Olimpo	27	3	6	18	16	50	−34	15	

Source: AFA
Rules for classification: 1) points; 2) play-off (only if needed to decide championship); 3) goal difference; 4) goals scored; 5) head-to-head points; 6) head-to-head goal difference; 7) head-to-head goals scored.
(C) Champions
Notes:

2017–18 Argentine Primera División champions

33rd title

== Results ==
Teams played every other team once (either at home or away) completing a total of 27 rounds.

Home \ Away	ARG	ARS	ATU	BAN	BEL	BOC	CHA	COL	DYJ	EST	GLP	GOD	HUR	IND	LAN	NOB	OLI	PAT	RAC	RIV	ROS	SLO	SMA	TAL	TEM	TIG	UNI	VEL
Argentinos Juniors	—	3–2	2–2	—	1–2	2–0	1–0	0–1	2–1	—	—	1–2	—	—	—	1–0	1–0	—	2–0	—	—	—	2–0	—	2–2	—	3–1	—
Arsenal	—	—	—	—	—	—	—	0–1	—	—	0–0	—	1–1	1–2	2–1	—	—	1–1	—	0–3	4–0	—	0–1	0–1	0–1	0–0	—	1–1
Atlético Tucumán	—	0–0	—	—	0–0	1–1	1–1	2–0	0–1	—	—	2–1	—	—	—	1–1	1–1	—	3–1	—	—	—	2–1	—	3–0	0–0	0–0	—
Banfield	2–3	1–2	0–0	—	2–1	0–1	2–1	1–1	0–1	—	—	1–1	—	—	—	1–0	3–0	—	1–0	—	—	—	—	—	0–0	—	0–2	—
Belgrano	—	3–0	—	—	—	—	—	1–0	—	—	2–0	—	1–0	0–0	0–0	—	—	2–2	2–2	—	—	—	1–0	0–0	2–3	0–0	—	2–2
Boca Juniors	—	2–0	—	—	4–0	—	1–0	2–0	1–2	—	—	4–1	—	—	—	3–1	3–0	—	1–2	—	—	—	4–2	2–1	1–0	2–1	2–0	—
Chacarita Juniors	—	2–2	—	—	0–1	—	—	0–2	—	—	2–0	—	0–2	1–2	3–0	—	—	—	1–1	—	—	—	1–4	0–1	1–2	1–1	—	2–0
Colón	—	—	—	—	—	—	—	—	3–1	0–0	1–0	—	0–0	0–1	1–2	—	—	4–0	—	0–0	1–1	—	3–3	0–2	2–0	3–1	—	0–1
Defensa y Justicia	—	2–0	—	—	1–1	—	4–2	—	—	—	4–4	3–2	0–0	—	3–0	—	1–1	1–0	3–2	1–3	3–1	—	—	—	—	—	1–3	0–1
Estudiantes (LP)	1–0	2–1	1–0	1–1	0–1	0–1	0–2	—	0–1	—	—	0–1	—	—	—	4–2	1–0	—	1–2	—	—	1–3	—	—	—	—	2–0	—
Gimnasia y Esgrima (LP)	1–3	—	1–2	0–2	—	2–2	—	—	—	0–0	—	—	1–3	—	1–3	2–0	—	2–0	—	2–1	2–1	1–0	—	—	—	—	—	4–0
Godoy Cruz	—	1–0	—	—	2–1	—	1–0	2–1	—	—	3–0	—	2–1	1–0	4–1	—	—	—	1–2	—	—	—	2–0	2–1	3–0	2–0	—	—
Huracán	1–0	—	3–2	1–1	—	3–3	—	—	—	1–0	—	—	—	—	4–0	1–0	—	1–1	—	1–0	2–3	1–1	—	—	—	—	0–0	1–0
Independiente	2–1	—	0–2	1–0	—	1–0	—	—	0–1	1–2	2–2	—	3–1	—	0–1	—	—	1–1	—	1–0	1–1	0–1	—	—	—	—	—	1–0
Lanús	0–0	—	0–0	0–0	—	0–1	—	—	—	0–0	—	—	—	—	—	1–0	0–2	1–1	—	1–0	1–1	0–2	—	—	—	—	2–1	0–0
Newell's Old Boys	—	2–1	—	—	0–1	—	2–1	0–1	1–0	—	—	0–0	—	0–1	—	—	2–0	—	2–2	—	—	—	2–0	2–1	0–0	2–1	1–1	—
Olimpo	—	2–1	—	—	1–2	—	2–0	0–3	—	—	0–1	1–1	0–2	1–1	—	—	—	—	1–2	—	—	—	0–2	2–2	1–1	1–5	—	—
Patronato	2–1	—	2–1	0–0	—	0–2	3–0	—	—	0–1	—	0–0	—	—	—	0–0	1–0	—	—	0–1	3–0	0–0	—	—	—	—	2–3	—
Racing	—	2–0	—	—	—	—	—	1–3	—	—	3–1	—	4–0	0–1	3–1	—	—	5–0	—	0–2	—	—	0–0	1–1	4–1	1–0	—	2–1
River Plate	1–1	—	2–2	3–1	3–1	1–2	1–1	—	—	2–0	—	2–2	—	—	—	1–3	2–0	—	—	—	2–0	2–0	—	—	—	—	2–0	—
Rosario Central	1–3	—	0–1	0–4	2–1	1–0	3–1	—	—	1–1	—	1–2	—	—	—	1–0	5–0	—	0–2	—	—	0–0	—	—	—	—	1–0	—
San Lorenzo	1–0	1–0	2–0	0–1	2–0	1–1	1–0	0–0	3–1	—	—	0–5	—	—	—	1–0	2–0	—	1–1	—	—	—	—	—	—	—	0–0	—
San Martín (SJ)	—	—	—	2–1	—	—	—	—	1–0	1–0	3–0	—	0–1	0–4	1–1	—	—	2–0	—	1–3	3–1	1–3	—	—	1–1	—	0–0	0–2
Talleres (C)	2–0	—	3–1	1–0	—	—	—	—	1–0	0–1	2–0	—	0–0	0–2	5–2	—	—	1–0	—	4–0	0–1	2–0	—	—	—	—	—	0–0
Temperley	—	—	—	—	—	—	—	—	1–4	0–3	1–1	—	1–2	0–0	2–2	—	—	1–2	—	0–1	1–1	0–2	1–0	0–1	—	2–1	—	2–4
Tigre	2–0	—	—	1–2	—	—	—	—	1–1	2–0	2–0	—	0–2	1–1	0–0	—	—	1–3	—	1–1	1–1	1–2	—	0–0	—	—	—	0–3
Unión	—	0–0	—	—	1–1	—	0–0	1–1	—	—	1–0	2–0	—	1–0	—	—	2–0	—	2–1	—	—	—	1–1	3–0	3–0	3–3	—	—
Vélez Sarsfield	1–1	—	2–0	1–0	—	0–4	—	—	—	3–3	—	0–1	—	—	—	1–0	3–0	0–2	—	1–0	2–2	2–2	—	—	—	—	0–2	—

Source: AFA
Legend: Blue = home team win; Yellow = draw; Red = away team win.

== Season statistics ==
=== Top goalscorers ===
Rank	Player	Club	Goals
1	(Uruguay) Santiago García	Godoy Cruz	17
2	(Argentina) Lautaro Martínez	Racing	13
2	(Uruguay) Sebastián Ribas	Patronato	13
4	(Argentina) Franco Soldano	Unión	11
5	(Argentina) Ramón Ábila	Huracán / Boca Juniors	10
5	(Argentina) Javier Marcelo Correa	Godoy Cruz / Colón	10
5	(Argentina) Fernando Andrés Márquez	Defensa y Justicia	10
5	(Argentina) Ignacio Scocco	River Plate	10
8	(Argentina) Darío Benedetto	Boca Juniors	9
8	(Argentina) Nicolás Blandi	San Lorenzo	9
8	(Argentina) Darío Cvitanich	Banfield	9
8	(Argentina) Ignacio Pussetto	Huracán	9

Source: AFA

=== Top assists ===
Rank	Player	Club	Assists
1	(Argentina) Cristian Pavón	Boca Juniors	11
2	(Argentina) Matías Vargas	Vélez Sarsfield	10
3	(Uruguay) Brahian Alemán	Gimnasia y Esgrima (LP)	7
3	(Argentina) Lucas Gamba	Unión	7
3	(Argentina) Leonardo Gil	Rosario Central	7
3	(Argentina) Pablo Mouche	Banfield	7
7	(Argentina) Luciano Abecasis	Godoy Cruz	6
7	(Argentina) Ramón Ábila	Huracán / Boca Juniors	6
7	(Argentina) Fernando Belluschi	San Lorenzo	6
7	(Argentina) Federico Carrizo	Rosario Central	6
7	(Argentina) Ricardo Centurión	Racing	6
7	(Argentina) Alexis Mac Allister	Argentinos Juniors	6
7	(Argentina) Augusto Solari	Racing	6

Source: AFA

== Relegation ==
Relegation at the end of the season is based on coefficients, which take into consideration the points obtained by the clubs during the present season and the three previous seasons (only seasons at the top-flight are counted). The total tally is then divided by the total number of games played in the top flight on those four seasons and an average is calculated. The four teams with the worst average at the end of the season were relegated to the Primera B Nacional.

Pos	Team	2015 Pts	2016 Pts	2016–17 Pts	2017–18 Pts	Total Pts	Total Pld	Avg	Relegation
1	Boca Juniors	64	20	63	58	205	103	1.99	
2	San Lorenzo	61	34	53	50	198	103	1.922	
3	Racing	57	24	55	45	181	103	1.757	
4	Independiente	54	27	53	46	180	103	1.748	
5	Estudiantes (LP)	51	32	56	36	175	103	1.699	
6	River Plate	49	18	56	45	168	103	1.631	
7	Godoy Cruz	32	33	43	56	164	103	1.592	
8	Talleres (C)	—	—	42	46	88	57	1.544	
9	Lanús	42	38	50	29	159	103	1.544	
10	Argentinos Juniors	—	—	—	41	41	27	1.519	
11	Rosario Central	59	20	44	32	155	103	1.505	
12	Banfield	50	15	54	35	154	103	1.495	
13	Defensa y Justicia	32	25	49	44	150	103	1.456	
14	Colón	34	17	49	41	141	103	1.369	
15	Atlético Tucumán	—	30	33	36	99	73	1.356	
16	Gimnasia y Esgrima (LP)	44	25	43	27	139	103	1.35	
17	Unión	41	22	32	43	138	103	1.34	
18	Newell's Old Boys	40	16	49	29	134	103	1.301	
19	Belgrano	51	16	26	40	133	103	1.291	
20	Huracán	30	25	29	48	132	103	1.282	
21	Vélez Sarsfield	29	24	37	38	128	103	1.243	
22	San Martín (SJ)	37	23	33	33	126	103	1.223	
23	Patronato	—	20	34	33	87	73	1.192	
24	Tigre	46	20	31	24	121	103	1.175	
25	Temperley (R)	30	16	37	23	106	103	1.029	Relegation to Primera B Nacional
26	Olimpo (R)	36	13	38	15	102	103	0.99	Relegation to Primera B Nacional
27	Arsenal (R)	27	27	27	17	98	103	0.951	Relegation to Primera B Nacional
28	Chacarita Juniors (R)	—	—	—	18	18	27	0.667	Relegation to Primera B Nacional

Source: AFA

== Awards ==
The following players were rewarded for their performances during the season.

- Best goalkeeper: (Argentina) Franco Armani (River Plate)
- Best defender: (Argentina) Alejandro Donatti (Racing)
- Best midfielder: (Argentina) Pablo Guiñazú (Talleres (C))
- Best forward: (Uruguay) Santiago García (Godoy Cruz)
- Best save: (Argentina) Gonzalo Rehak (Independiente) against Racing
- Best goal: (Colombia) Edwin Cardona (Boca Juniors) against River Plate
- Best coach: (Argentina) Frank Darío Kudelka (Talleres (C))
- Best player: (Argentina) Cristian Pavón (Boca Juniors)
- Topscorer: (Uruguay) Santiago García (Godoy Cruz)
- Honorary Award: (Argentina) Daniel Montenegro (Huracán)
- Breakthrough player: (Argentina) Lautaro Martínez (Racing)

=== Team of the Season ===
Team of the Season
Goalkeeper	(Argentina) Martín Campaña (Independiente)		
Defenders	(Argentina) Leonardo Godoy (Talleres)	(Argentina) Alan Franco (Independiente)	(Argentina) Cristian Lema (Belgrano)
Midfielders	(Argentina) Pablo Guiñazú (Talleres)	(Colombia) Wilmar Barrios (Boca Juniors)	(Argentina) Cristian Pavón (Boca Juniors)
Forwards	(Argentina) Santiago García (Godoy Cruz)	(Argentina) Lautaro Martínez (Racing Club)	

== See also ==
- 2017–18 Primera B Nacional
- 2016–17 Copa Argentina
- 2017–18 Copa Argentina
