= 2013–14 Primera B Metropolitana =

Primera B Metropolitana
- Season: 2013–14
- Champions: Nueva Chicago (3rd. title)
- Promoted: Nueva Chicago; Temperley
- Relegated: Flandria; Defensores de Belgrano
- Top goalscorer: Ramón Lentini (Chacarita Juniors) (16 goals)
- Biggest home win: Los Andes 5-1 Chacarita Juniors (30 April 2014); Deportivo Morón 4-0 Flandria (8 December 2013); Flandria 4-0 Los Andes (15 February 2014); Deportivo Merlo 4-0 UAI Urquiza (16 March 2014)
- Biggest away win: Flandria 0-4 Platense (1 March 2014)
- Highest scoring: Fénix 4-3 Temperley (11 February 2014); Platense 4-3 Tristán Suárez (6 May 2014)

The 2013–14 Primera B Metropolitana was the 115th. edition of Primera B Metropolitana, the third division of the Argentine football league system. The tournament was reserved for teams directly affiliated to the Argentine Football Association while teams affiliated to AFA through local leagues (known as "indirectly affiliated to AFA") competed in Torneo Argentino A, which was the other third division competition.

The regular season began on August 2, 2013, and is scheduled to end on May 31, 2014. Post-season matches were scheduled to start on June 4 and end on June 14. 21 teams will take part of the competition with seventeen of them remaining from the 2012–13 season. They'll be joined by two teams relegated from the 2012-13 Primera B Nacional and two teams promoted from the 2012–13 Primera C.

Nueva Chicago won their 3rd. title in the division promoting to Primera B Nacional while Temperley was the 2nd. team promoted after winning the Torneo Reducido defeating Platense 5–4 on penalties in the final.

On the other hand, Flandria and Defensores de Belgrano were relegated to Primera C.

== Competition format ==
The tournament was composed of 21 teams playing on a double round-robin format, each team then playing a total of 40 matches. Three points were awarded for a win, one for a draw and none for a loss. The team with more points was declared champion and was promoted to Primera B Nacional. Teams positioned 2nd to 5th qualified for the Torneo Reducido, which was played on a, home and away, knock-out system, the pairings were 2nd. vs 5th. and 3rd. vs 4th. for the semifinals, with the winners advancing to the final, the winner of the final was then promoted to the Primera B Nacional. If the playoff ended in a draw, there was a penalty shoot-out to determine a winner.

Relegation was not dependent on the standings table, rather, a points average system was used, creating a separate parallel standings table considering the performances of the teams through the latest 3 seasons (2011–12, 2012–13, 2013–14). The total of points was divided by the total of matches played on the division to get the average of points per match for each team. The two teams with the worst points average were relegated to Primera C.

== Clubs ==
17 teams remained from the previous season. Nueva Chicago and Deportivo Merlo had been relegated from the Primera B Nacional and replaced Villa San Carlos and Brown (Adrogué) (which had promoted the previous season). UAI Urquiza and Fénix joined too after winning promotion from the Primera C and replacing Central Córdoba de Rosario and San Telmo, both relegated.

Club	City	Province	Stadium
Acassuso	Boulogne	Buenos Aires	La Quema
Almagro	José Ingenieros	Buenos Aires	Tres de Febrero
Atlanta	Buenos Aires	autonomous city	León Kolbovski
Barracas Central	Buenos Aires	autonomous city	Barracas Central
Chacarita Juniors	Villa Maipú	Buenos Aires	Chacarita Juniors
Colegiales	Florida Oeste	Buenos Aires	Libertarios Unidos
Comunicaciones	Buenos Aires	autonomous city	Alfredo Ramos
Defensores de Belgrano	Buenos Aires	autonomous city	Juan Pasquale
Deportivo Armenio	Ingeniero Maschwitz	Buenos Aires	República de Armenia
Deportivo Merlo	Merlo	Buenos Aires	José Manuel Moreno
Deportivo Morón	Morón	Buenos Aires	Nuevo Francisco Urbano
Estudiantes (BA)	Caseros	Buenos Aires	Ciudad de Caseros
Fénix	Pilar	Buenos Aires	Carlos Barraza
Flandria	Jáuregui	Buenos Aires	Carlos V
Los Andes	Lomas de Zamora	Buenos Aires	Eduardo Gallardón
Nueva Chicago	Buenos Aires	autonomous city	República de Mataderos
Platense	Florida	Buenos Aires	Ciudad de Vicente López
Temperley	Turdera	Buenos Aires	Alfredo Beranger
Tristán Suárez	Tristán Suárez	Buenos Aires	20 de Octubre
UAI Urquiza	Villa Lynch	Buenos Aires	Monumental de Villa Lynch
Villa Dálmine	Campana	Buenos Aires	El Coliseo

== Standings ==
Pos	Team	Pld	W	D	L	GF	GA	GD	Pts	Promotion or qualification
1	Nueva Chicago (P)	36	19	12	5	41	20	+21	69	Promoted to the 2014 Primera B Nacional
2	Temperley (P)	36	15	14	7	48	38	+10	59	Promoted to the 2014 Primera B Nacional by winning the Torneo Reducido
3	Atlanta	36	14	16	6	37	23	+14	58	Qualified to the Torneo Reducido
4	Platense	36	15	11	10	46	35	+11	56	Qualified to the Torneo Reducido
5	Deportivo Morón	37	15	10	12	43	35	+8	55	Qualified to the Torneo Reducido
6	Los Andes	36	14	12	10	37	28	+9	54	
7	Defensores de Belgrano	37	13	15	9	29	22	+7	54	
8	Chacarita Juniors	37	13	12	12	38	40	−2	51	
9	Deportivo Merlo	37	12	14	11	37	31	+6	50	
10	Fénix	36	14	8	14	49	46	+3	50	
11	Barracas Central	36	12	14	10	33	32	+1	50	
12	Tristán Suárez	36	11	14	11	33	37	−4	47	
13	Almagro	36	12	11	13	28	34	−6	47	
14	Deportivo Armenio	36	10	14	12	37	35	+2	44	
15	Acassuso	36	9	16	11	31	34	−3	43	
16	Villa Dálmine	36	10	12	14	30	36	−6	42	
17	Estudiantes	36	9	14	13	25	29	−4	41	
18	UAI Urquiza	36	11	8	17	34	49	−15	41	
19	Comunicaciones	36	9	13	14	28	32	−4	40	
20	Flandria	36	6	12	18	29	53	−24	30	
21	Colegiales	36	6	10	20	19	43	−24	28	

(P) Promoted

== Results ==
Home \ Away	ACA	ALM	ATL	BAR	CHA	COL	COM	DEF	ARM	MER	MOR	EST	FEN	FLA	LAN	NCH	PLA	TEM	TRI	UAI	VDA
Acassuso		1–1	0–1	1–0	1–1	2–1	0–2	2–2	0–2	1–0	2–0	1–3	2–0	0–0	0–0	1–2	2–0	2–3	0–0	1–1	0–0
Almagro	0–0		1–2	1–2	2–1	1–0	1–0	2–1	1–0	1–1	0–1	1–1	0–0	0–0	0–0	0–2	2–1	1–2	1–1	1–0	1–0
Atlanta	4–1	1–0		1–0	0–2	2–0	0–0	1–1	1–1	0–0	1–0	1–0	0–0	3–0	1–0	1–2	0–1	1–1	0–0	0–0	0–1
Barracas Central	2–0	1–1	1–1		1–0	3–0	1–1	2–3	0–0	1–0	1–1	2–0	1–3	3–1	1–1	0–0	0–0	0–0	1–0	2–2	0–1
Chacarita Juniors	2–1	1–0	1–2	0–0		1–0	2–0	0–2	1–0	1–2	0–2	1–0	1–3	1–1	2–2	1–0	0–1	2–0	0–0	3–0	1–1
Colegiales	1–1	2–0	0–2	0–0	1–0		1–3	0–1	1–3	1–3	0–0	0–2	1–1	2–0	2–0	0–1	2–2	1–2	0–0	0–1	2–1
Comunicaciones	1–1	0–1	0–0	0–1	1–1	2–0		0–0	1–0	0–0	0–1	0–0	1–1	3–1	0–0	1–2	1–0	2–1	1–1	0–2	1–1
Defensores de Belgrano	0–0	1–1	1–0	0–1	2–0	0–0	2–0		0–0	0–0	0–2	1–0	3–1	1–0	0–0	0–0	3–0	0–0	1–0	1–0	0–0
Deportivo Armenio	0–3	1–2	0–0	2–2	2–2	0–0	0–0	2–0		0–0	0–2	1–0	1–3	0–0	2–0	0–0	0–0	1–2	3–0	3–1	2–3
Deportivo Merlo	1–0	1–2	1–2	3–0	0–1	2–0	1–0	1–0	1–1		2–2	1–1	0–1	1–1	2–4	0–0	0–1	1–2	3–0	4–0	0–0
Deportivo Morón	0–0	0–0	2–1	1–0	3–1	2–0	2–1	0–1	3–0	0–2		0–0	2–3	4–0	0–2	0–1	2–3	1–2	0–0	4–2	2–1
Estudiantes	0–1	1–1	1–1	0–0	0–0	2–0	0–2	2–2	0–0	0–0	0–0		1–0	1–0	3–0	0–2	0–1	3–2	3–1	3–1	1–0
Fénix	1–2	0–1	2–3	0–1	1–0	0–0	1–0	0–0	2–0	1–0	2–0	4–2		0–0	0–1	1–0	2–4	4–3	2–2	0–1	2–1
Flandria	0–3	3–0	0–0	0–1	1–0	0–0	2–2	0–1	1–3	3–0	0–0	2–1	1–4		4–0	0–0	0–4	0–1	2–0	0–2	0–0
Los Andes	2–0	1–0	1–1	2–0	5–1	1–0	1–0	1–2	1–1	0–0	2–0	1–0	1–2	3–0		0–1	1–1	1–1	0–1	2–0	1–0
Nueva Chicago	2–1	2–3	1–1	0–0	1–3	2–0	0–1	1–0	2–0	1–0	1–1	0–0	3–0	1–0	3–2		3–1	0–0	0–0	1–0	2–0
Platense	1–1	2–0	1–1	2–3	2–2	1–2	4–1	0–0	0–0	0–1	1–0	2–0	2–0	3–1	0–0	1–1		0–0	4–3	3–0	2–0
Temperley	0–0	0–0	0–0	1–0	1–2	0–0	2–1	1–0	1–1	3–3	1–1	1–1	2–1	2–3	0–1	2–0	2–1		1–2	2–1	1–0
Tristán Suárez	0–0	0–0	1–0	1–1	1–2	2–1	2–1	2–0	0–3	3–0	0–1	0–0	2–2	3–3	1–0	1–0	0–1	1–1		2–0	1–1
UAI Urquiza	1–1	1–0	1–2	2–1	0–0	3–0	2–0	0–0	2–1	1–2	2–0	0–2	2–1	1–0	1–0	0–1	0–0	1–4	1–2		1–2
Villa Dálmine	2–1	2–1	0–2	2–3	1–1	1–1	0–1	2–1	1–2	0–1	3–1	1–0	0–2	1–1	0–0	1–1	2–0	1–2	0–0	1–1	

Updated to match(es) played on 26 May 2014. Source:
Legend: Blue = home team win; Yellow = draw; Red = away team win.

== Relegation ==
Pos	Team	11/12	12/13	13/14	Total	Pld	Average
1º	Nueva Chicago	70	-	69	139	76	1,829
2º	Atlanta	-	65	58	123	76	1,618
3º	Platense	61	70	56	187	116	1,612
4º	Estudiantes	72	63	41	176	116	1,517
5º	Chacarita Juniors	-	60	51	111	77	1,442
6º	Almagro	54	64	47	165	116	1,422
7º	Los Andes	61	48	54	163	116	1,405
8º	Fénix	-	-	50	50	36	1,389
9º	Temperley	46	55	59	160	116	1,379
10º	Deportivo Merlo	-	-	50	50	37	1,351
11º	Comunicaciones	60	54	40	154	116	1,328
12º	Deportivo Armenio	50	58	44	152	116	1,310
13º	Barracas Central	40	56	50	146	116	1,259
14º	Acassuso	55	48	43	146	116	1,259
15º	Colegiales	73	44	28	145	116	1,250
16º	Tristán Suárez	45	50	47	142	116	1,224
17º	Villa Dálmine	-	48	42	90	76	1,184
18º	Deportivo Morón	35	47	55	137	117	1,171
19º	UAI Urquiza	-	-	41	41	36	1,139
20º	Defensores de Belgrano	41	35	54	130	117	1,111
21º	Flandria	50	48	30	128	116	1,103

Relegation Zone: the teams that occupy these positions once the tournament is finished will be relegated to the Primera C

== Torneo Reducido ==
Teams placed 2th. to 5th. participated in torneo reducido, a single-elimination tournament, playing in a two-legged tie. The pairings were 2nd. vs 5th. and 3rd. vs 4th. for the semifinals, with the winners playing the final. The winner of reducido became the 2nd. team to promote to Primera B Nacional.

Team 1	Agg.	Team 2	1st leg	2nd leg
Temperley	2–0	Fénix	0-0	2–0
Platense	1–1 (4–3 p)	Atlanta	0-0	1–1

=== Final ===
Torneo Reducido finals
(2nd. promotion playoff)
5 June 2014
20:15
First leg

Platense	1–0	Temperley
Rodríguez 80'

Estadio Ciudad de Vicente López, Florida
Attendance: 13,500
Referee: Pablo Dóvalo

8 June 2014
22:10
Second leg

Temperley	1–0	Platense
Rojas 80'	Report
Penalties
Sambueza (penalty missed); Corado (penalty scored); Di Lorenzo (penalty scored); Quiñónez (penalty missed); Crivelli (penalty scored); Arregui (penalty scored); Rojas (penalty scored)	5–4	Rodríguez (penalty missed); Páez (penalty scored); Melivillo (penalty missed); Pansardi (penalty scored); D. Vega (penalty scored); Molina (penalty scored); H. Vega (penalty missed)

Estadio Alfredo Beranger, Turdera
Attendance: 17,000
Referee: Ignacio Lupani

Team details

Temperley
Platense

GK	1	(Argentina) Federico Crivelli
DF	4	(Argentina) Carlos Ramos
DF	2	(Argentina) Brian Cucco
DF	6	(Argentina) Gastón Aguirre	Booked
DF	3	(Argentina) Patricio Romero
MF	7	(Argentina) Fernando Brandán	Booked	(substituted off) 77'
MF	8	(Argentina) Adrián Arregui
MF	5	(Argentina) Darío Salina		(substituted off) 66'
MF	10	(Argentina) Leonardo Di Lorenzo
FW	9	(Argentina) Luis López		(substituted off) 49'
FW	11	(Argentina) Fabián Sambueza	Booked
Substitutions:
FW	18	(Argentina) Gastón Corado		(substituted in) 49'
MF	16	(Argentina) Cristian Quiñonez		(substituted in) 66'
FW	17	(Argentina) Ariel Rojas		(substituted in) 77' (yellow card)
Manager:
(Argentina) Ricardo Rezza

GK	1	(Uruguay) Claudio Flores	Booked
DF	4	(Argentina) Humberto Vega
DF	2	(Argentina) Walter D. Gómez
DF	6	(Argentina) Diego F. Molina
DF	3	(Argentina) Maximiliano Barreiro	Booked	(substituted off) 76'
MF	7	(Argentina) Luis O. Quiroga		(substituted off) 84'
MF	8	(Argentina) Nahuel Pansardi
MF	5	(Argentina) Jonathan Páez
MF	11	(Argentina) Patricio R. Rodríguez
FW	9	(Argentina) Walter P. Ortiz		(substituted off) 62'
FW	10	(Argentina) Daniel Vega
Substitutions:
FW	14	(Argentina) Facundo Melivilo		(substituted in) 62' (yellow card)
DF	16	(Argentina) Nicolás Morgantini		(substituted in) 76'
DF	13	(Argentina) Juan P. Rezzónico		(substituted in) 84'
Manager:
(Argentina) Sebastián Méndez

Note: after the series ended 1–1 on aggregate, Temperley won 5–4 on penalties, promoting to Primera B Nacional.
