= Gonzalo Bozzoni =

Spanish-born Argentine footballer

Personal information
- Full name: Gonzalo Claudio Bozzoni Ruiz
- Date of birth: 12 February 1990 (age 36)
- Place of birth: Las Palmas, Spain
- Height: 1.78 m (5 ft 10 in)
- Position: Defender

Youth career
- 2001–2007: Vélez Sarsfield

Senior career*
Years	Team	Apps	(Gls)
2007–2008	Atlético Madrid B		
2008–2009	Atlético Madrid C		
2010	Racing Club	0	(0)
2011	River Plate	0	(0)
2011–2013	San Lorenzo	2	(0)
2013–2014	Atlanta	8	(0)
2014	Aldosivi	5	(0)
2015	Fénix	33	(0)
2016–2019	Acassuso	52	(1)

International career
- Argentina U15
- Argentina U17
- * Club domestic league appearances and goals

Gonzalo Claudio Bozzoni Ruiz (born 12 February 1990) is a Spanish-born Argentine professional footballer who plays as a defender.

== Club career ==
Bozzoni's life as a senior footballer began in Spain with Atlético Madrid B (from 2007 to 2008) and Atlético Madrid C (from 2008 to 2009); having signed from Vélez Sarsfield where he spent six years in their academy. In 2011, after stints with Racing Club and River Plate, Bozzoni began featuring for Argentine Primera División side San Lorenzo. He made his professional debut on 14 October versus Banfield, before appearing again later that month against Arsenal de Sarandí. Those were his only two matches for San Lorenzo, with the defender departing ahead of 2013–14 to join Atlanta in Primera B Metropolitana. Nine appearances arrived.

Bozzoni moved to Aldosivi in July 2014; where he won promotion to the 2015 Primera División. Fénix signed Bozzoni on 21 February 2015. Having featured thirty-three times for Fénix in the third tier, Bozzoni joined Acassuso in June 2016. He netted the first goal of his career on 17 December as Acassuso defeated his ex-club Atlanta away from home. He made forty appearances across his opening two campaigns with them. Bozzoni departed in June 2019.

== International career ==
Bozzoni represented Argentina at U15, at the South American Championship in 2005, and U17 level.

== Career statistics ==
As of 1 September 2020.

Appearances and goals by club, season and competition
Club	Season	League			Cup		Continental		Other		Total	
Club	Season	Division	Apps	Goals	Apps	Goals	Apps	Goals	Apps	Goals	Apps	Goals
Racing Club	2010–11	Primera División	0	0	0	0	—		0	0	0	0
River Plate	2010–11	Primera División	0	0	0	0	—		0	0	0	0
San Lorenzo	2011–12	Primera División	2	0	0	0	—		0	0	2	0
San Lorenzo	2012–13	Primera División	0	0	0	0	—		0	0	0	0
San Lorenzo	Total		2	0	0	0	—		0	0	2	0
Atlanta	2013–14	Primera B Metropolitana	8	0	1	0	—		0	0	9	0
Aldosivi	2014	Primera B Nacional	5	0	0	0	—		1 (Note: Appearance(s) in the Primera B Nacional play-offs)	0	6	0
Fénix	2015	Primera B Metropolitana	33	0	0	0	—		0	0	33	0
Acassuso	2016–17	Primera B Metropolitana	9	1	0	0	—		0	0	9	1
Acassuso	2017–18	Primera B Metropolitana	30	0	0	0	—		1 (Note: Appearance(s) in the Primera B Metropolitana play-offs)	0	31	0
Acassuso	2018–19	Primera B Metropolitana	13	0	0	0	—		0	0	13	0
Acassuso	Total		52	1	0	0	—		1	0	53	1
Career total			100	1	1	0	—		2	0	103	1
