= Alexis Vega =

Alexis Vega may refer to:

- Alexis Vega (footballer, born 1993), Argentine midfielder
- Alexis Vega (footballer, born 1997), Mexican forward
