= Spinella =

Spinella is an Italian surname. Notable people with the surname include:

- Ezequiel Spinella (born 1999), Argentine footballer
- Ralph Spinella (1923–2021), American fencer
- Stephen Spinella (born 1956), American actor

== Other uses ==
- Spinella (brachiopod), an extinct genus in order Palaeocopida
- Spinella, a taxonomic synonym for a genus of plants, Riccardia

Spinella
