= Leonardo Fernández =

Leonardo Fernández may refer to:

- Leonardo Fernández (Bolivian footballer) (Leonardo Alberto Fernández Napollitano)
- Leonardo Carlos Fernández, Argentine retired and manager
- Leonardo Fernández (Uruguayan footballer) (Leonardo Cecilio Fernández López)
