= Matías Castro =

Matías Castro may refer to:

- Matías Castro (footballer, born 1987), Uruguayan football goalkeeper for Temperley
- Matías Castro (footballer, born 1991), Argentine football striker for Montevideo Wanderers
