= Lucas Mulazzi =

Argentine footballer (born 1999)

Personal information
- Full name: Lucas Javier Mulazzi
- Date of birth: 27 September 1999 (age 27)
- Place of birth: Quilmes, Argentina
- Height: 1.85 m (6 ft 1 in)
- Position: Centre-back

Team information
- Current team: Deportivo Laferrere

Youth career
- Temperley

Senior career*
| Years | Team | Apps | (Gls) |
| 2017–2021 | Temperley | 8 | (0) |
| 2020 | → Elche B (loan) | 6 | (0) |
| 2022– | Deportivo Laferrere | 12 | (0) |
- * Club domestic league appearances and goals as of 17:50, 3 August 2022 (UTC)

Lucas Javier Mulazzi (born 27 September 1999) is an Argentine professional footballer who plays as a centre-back for Deportivo Laferrere.

== Career ==
Mulazzi got his career in senior football underway with Temperley. Having been an unused substitute for eleven fixtures across three seasons from 2016–17, four of which were as a seventeen-year-old in April 2017, Mulazzi made his debut in 2018–19 on 20 April 2019 during a Primera B Nacional match at the Estadio Alfredo Beranger versus Platense; featuring for the full duration of a 1–1 draw. On 17 January 2020, Mulazzi was loaned out Spanish club Elche CF Ilicitano with a purchase option of around €350,000 for 70% of the player's rights. However, he returned to Temperley after six games played for the Spanish side.

== Career statistics ==
As of 21 April 2019.

Appearances and goals by club, season and competition
| Club | Season | League | | | Cup | | League Cup | | Continental | | Other | | Total | |
| Club | Season | Division | Apps | Goals | Apps | Goals | Apps | Goals | Apps | Goals | Apps | Goals | Apps | Goals |
|---|---|---|---|---|---|---|---|---|---|---|---|---|---|---|
| Temperley | 2016–17 | Primera División | 0 | 0 | 0 | 0 | — | | — | | 0 | 0 | 0 | 0 |
| Temperley | 2017–18 | Primera División | 0 | 0 | 0 | 0 | — | | — | | 0 | 0 | 0 | 0 |
| Temperley | 2018–19 | Primera B Nacional | 1 | 0 | 0 | 0 | — | | — | | 0 | 0 | 1 | 0 |
| Career total | | | 1 | 0 | 0 | 0 | — | | — | | 0 | 0 | 1 | 0 |
