= Luis López (footballer, born 1987) =

Argentine footballer

Personal information
- Full name: Luis Eduardo López
- Date of birth: 23 June 1987 (age 39)
- Place of birth: Buenos Aires, Argentina
- Height: 1.88 m (6 ft 2 in)
- Position: Centre-forward

Team information
- Current team: Temperley

Youth career
- Temperley

Senior career*
Years	Team	Apps	(Gls)
2008–2017	Temperley	177	(49)
2011	→ Almirante Brown (loan)	5	(0)
2015	→ Atlético Junior (loan)	6	(1)
2016–2017	→ Tristán Suárez (loan)	38	(12)
2017–2019	Tristán Suárez	55	(19)
2019–2021	Atlanta	23	(10)
2021	Defensores de Belgrano	32	(3)
2022	Deportivo Morón	7	(0)
2022–	Temperley	97	(21)
- * Club domestic league appearances and goals as of 17:37, 27 June 2025 (UTC)

Luis Eduardo López (born 23 June 1987) is an Argentine professional footballer who plays as a centre-forward for Temperley.

== Career ==
López's career got underway with Temperley during the 2008–09 Primera B Metropolitana campaign, a season he scored seven goals in; the first coming against Atlanta on 10 October 2008. In total, he scored twenty-one times in his first three seasons with Temperley. In August 2011, Primera B Nacional team Almirante Brown loaned López. Six appearances in all competitions followed. He returned to Temperley for the 2012–13 and 2013–14 seasons and subsequently netted twenty-eight goals, seventeen in 2013–14 which ended with promotion to the 2014 Primera B Nacional.

On 12 February 2015, following Temperley's promotion to the Argentine Primera División, López departed to Colombian football to play for Atlético Junior on loan. He scored his first goal for Junior on his debut appearance versus Barranquilla in the Copa Colombia on 29 March. A year later, López found himself out on loan once more - to Tristán Suárez in Primera B Metropolitana. Twelve goals followed in his first two campaigns, prior to Tristán Suárez signing him permanently ahead of the 2017–18 Primera B Metropolitana season. On 29 April 2019, it was announced that his contract had been terminated.

López completed a move to Atlanta on 20 June 2019. López left Atlanta in February 2021 to join Defensores de Belgrano, where he played for the rest of 2021. In January 2022, López moved to Deportivo Morón. However, he left the club again a few months later, after terminating his contract and on 31 May 2022, he signed a deal with his former club, Temperley.

== Career statistics ==
As of 21 June 2019.

Club statistics
Club	Season	League			Cup		League Cup		Continental		Other		Total	
Club	Season	Division	Apps	Goals	Apps	Goals	Apps	Goals	Apps	Goals	Apps	Goals	Apps	Goals
Temperley	2011–12	Primera B Metropolitana	0	0	0	0	—		—		0	0	0	0
Temperley	2012–13	Primera B Metropolitana	34	11	0	0	—		—		0	0	34	11
Temperley	2013–14	Primera B Metropolitana	33	14	2	3	—		—		3 (Note: Appearance(s) in the Primera B Metropolitana play-offs)	0	38	17
Temperley	2014	Primera B Nacional	14	3	0	0	—		—		0	0	14	3
Temperley	2015	Primera División	6	0	0	0	—		—		0	0	6	0
Temperley	2016	Primera División	0	0	0	0	—		—		0	0	0	0
Temperley	2016–17	Primera División	0	0	0	0	—		—		0	0	0	0
Temperley	Total		87	28	2	3	—		—		3	0	92	31
Almirante Brown (loan)	2011–12	Primera B Nacional	5	0	1	0	—		—		0	0	6	0
Atlético Junior (loan)	2015	Categoría Primera A	6	1	2	1	—		0	0	1 (Note: Appearance(s) in the Categoría Primera A play-offs)	0	9	2
Tristán Suárez (loan)	2016	Primera B Metropolitana	12	2	0	0	—		—		0	0	12	2
Tristán Suárez (loan)	2016–17	Primera B Metropolitana	26	10	0	0	—		—		0	0	26	10
Tristán Suárez	2017–18	Primera B Metropolitana	26	12	0	0	—		—		3	0	29	12
Tristán Suárez	2018–19	Primera B Metropolitana	29	7	1	0	—		—		0	0	30	7
Tristán Suárez	Total		93	31	1	0	—		—		3	0	97	31
Atlanta	2019–20	Primera B Nacional	0	0	0	0	—		—		0	0	0	0
Career total			191	60	6	4	—		0	0	7	0	204	64

== Honours ==
Atlético Junior

- Copa Colombia: 2015
