= Darío Salina =

Argentine footballer

Personal information
- Full name: Claudio Darío Salina
- Date of birth: 25 September 1995 (age 31)
- Place of birth: San Vicente, Argentina
- Height: 1.74 m (5 ft 8 1/2 in)
- Position: Midfielder

Team information
- Current team: Acassuso

Senior career*
| Years | Team | Apps | (Gls) |
| 2011–2013 | Racing Club | 38 | (1) |
| 2014–2019 | Temperley | 28 | (0) |
| 2015 | → Defensores (loan) | 21 | (2) |
| 2016 | → Deportivo Armenio (loan) | 7 | (0) |
| 2019–2021 | San Telmo | 41 | (1) |
| 2022– | Acassuso | 14 | (0) |
- * Club domestic league appearances and goals

Claudio Darío Salina (born 25 September 1995) is an Argentine professional footballer who plays as a midfielder for Acassuso CF.

== Career ==
Salina began his career in 2011 with Racing Club in Torneo Argentino B, where he played until 2013 and scored one goal in thirty-eight matches. In 2014, Salina joined Temperley. He made his professional debut with Primera B Metropolitana side Temperley during the 2013–14 season, featuring for the full ninety minutes of a 2–1 win over UAI Urquiza on 31 March 2014. He made fifteen appearances in 2013–14 and ten in 2014, both campaigns ended with promotion. As Temperley prepped for the 2015 Primera División, Salina left on loan to play in Primera B Metropolitana for Defensores de Belgrano.

Whilst with Defensores de Belgrano, Salina netted the first goals of his senior career against Almirante Brown and Deportivo Español respectively. He returned to Temperley in 2016, but immediately departed on loan again. On 13 April 2016, Deportivo Armenio loaned Salina until the end of the 2016 Primera B Metropolitana season. He appeared seven times. as Deportivo Armenio were relegated to Primera C Metropolitana. In April 2017, Salina made his top-flight debut with Temperley versus Gimnasia y Esgrima. In July 2019, Salina joined San Telmo. He left in December 2021.

In January 2022, Salina joined Primera B Metropolitana side Acassuso CF.

== Career statistics ==
As of 9 July 2020.

Club statistics
| Club | Season | League | | | Cup | | League Cup | | Continental | | Other | | Total | |
| Club | Season | Division | Apps | Goals | Apps | Goals | Apps | Goals | Apps | Goals | Apps | Goals | Apps | Goals |
|---|---|---|---|---|---|---|---|---|---|---|---|---|---|---|
| Temperley | 2013–14 | Primera B Metropolitana | 11 | 0 | 0 | 0 | — | | — | | 4 (Note: Appearance(s) in the Primera B Metropolitana play-offs) | 0 | 15 | 0 |
| Temperley | 2014 | Primera B Nacional | 10 | 0 | 0 | 0 | — | | — | | 0 | 0 | 10 | 0 |
| Temperley | 2015 | Primera División | 0 | 0 | 0 | 0 | — | | — | | 0 | 0 | 0 | 0 |
| Temperley | 2016 | Primera División | 0 | 0 | 0 | 0 | — | | — | | 0 | 0 | 0 | 0 |
| Temperley | 2016–17 | Primera División | 1 | 0 | 0 | 0 | — | | — | | 0 | 0 | 1 | 0 |
| Temperley | 2017–18 | Primera División | 4 | 0 | 0 | 0 | — | | — | | 0 | 0 | 4 | 0 |
| Temperley | 2018–19 | Primera B Nacional | 2 | 0 | 2 | 0 | — | | — | | 0 | 0 | 4 | 0 |
| Temperley | Total | | 28 | 0 | 2 | 0 | — | | — | | 4 | 0 | 34 | 0 |
| Defensores de Belgrano (loan) | 2015 | Primera B Metropolitana | 21 | 2 | 0 | 0 | — | | — | | 2 | 0 | 23 | 2 |
| Deportivo Armenio (loan) | 2016 | Primera B Metropolitana | 7 | 0 | 0 | 0 | — | | — | | 0 | 0 | 7 | 0 |
| San Telmo | 2019–20 | Primera B Metropolitana | 18 | 0 | 1 | 0 | — | | — | | 0 | 0 | 19 | 0 |
| Career total | | | 72 | 2 | 3 | 0 | — | | — | | 6 | 0 | 81 | 2 |
