= Franco Sosa (footballer, born 1999) =

Argentine footballer

Personal information
- Full name: Franco Andrés Sosa
- Date of birth: 19 September 1999 (age 27)
- Place of birth: San Francisco Solano, Argentina
- Height: 1.71 m (5 ft 7 in)
- Position: Forward

Team information
- Current team: Argentino Quilmes

Youth career
- Temperley

Senior career*
Years	Team	Apps	(Gls)
2014–2021	Temperley	7	(1)
2021	→ Argentino Quilmes (loan)	30	(1)
2022–	Argentino Quilmes	36	(13)
2023	→ Unión San Felipe (loan)	14	(0)

International career
2014	Argentina U17		
- * Club domestic league appearances and goals as of 13 May 2024

Franco Andrés Sosa (born 19 September 1999) is an Argentine footballer currently playing as a forward for Argentino Quilmes.

== Club career ==
Sosa made his senior debut for Temperley in a 1–3 loss to Independiente Rivadavia, replacing Claudio Darío Salina for the final 23 minutes.

In 2023, Sosa moved on loan to Chilean club Unión San Felipe from Argentino de Quilmes on a one-year deal.

== International career ==
Shortly after making his debut, Sosa was called up to the Argentina under-17 squad for friendly games against Uruguay.

== Personal life ==
Sosa has two brothers, Agustín and Leandro, who are also professional footballers.

== Career statistics ==
As of 29 May 2020

Club	Season	League			Cup		Continental		Other		Total	
Club	Season	Division	Apps	Goals	Apps	Goals	Apps	Goals	Apps	Goals	Apps	Goals
Temperley	2014	Primera B Nacional	1	0	0	0	–		0	0	1	0
Temperley	2015	Argentine Primera División	0	0	0	0	–		0	0	0	0
Temperley	2016	Argentine Primera División	0	0	0	0	–		0	0	0	0
Temperley	2016–17	Argentine Primera División	0	0	0	0	–		0	0	0	0
Temperley	2017–18	Argentine Primera División	6	1	0	0	–		0	0	6	1
Temperley	2018–19	Primera B Nacional	0	0	0	0	–		0	0	0	0
Temperley	2019–20	Primera B Nacional	0	0	0	0	–		0	0	0	0
Career total			7	1	0	0	0	0	0	0	7	1
