= Agustín Sosa =

Argentine footballer

Personal information
- Full name: Agustín Alejandro Sosa
- Date of birth: 29 August 2000 (age 26)
- Place of birth: Lomas de Zamora, Argentina
- Height: 1.76 m (5 ft 9 in)
- Position: Right-back

Team information
- Current team: Deportivo Madryn

Youth career
- Temperley

Senior career*
Years	Team	Apps	(Gls)
2018–2025	Temperley	128	(1)
2019–2020	→ Talleres (loan)	12	(0)
2020–2021	→ Don Benito (loan)	7	(0)
2025–	Deportivo Madryn	48	(1)
- * Club domestic league appearances and goals as of 16:34, 27 April 2026 (UTC)

Agustín Alejandro Sosa (born 29 August 2000) is an Argentine professional footballer who plays as a right-back for Deportivo Madryn.

== Club career ==
Sosa's career started with Temperley. His first senior appearance arrived on 26 February 2018 during a goalless draw in the Primera División with Newell's Old Boys, which was the first of a further six appearances in the 2017–18 season as the club were relegated to Primera B Nacional. After eight matches in 2018–19, Sosa departed on loan to Primera B Metropolitana for 2019–20 with Talleres. Twelve appearances followed. August 2020 saw Sosa agree a loan move to Spanish football with Don Benito. He made his Segunda División B debut on 25 October against Badajoz; playing the full duration of a 2–0 loss.

== International career ==
In March 2018, Sosa received a call-up from Sebastián Beccacece for training with the Argentina U19s.

== Personal life ==
Sosa's brothers, Franco and Leandro, are fellow professional footballers.

== Career statistics ==
As of 4 January 2021.

Appearances and goals by club, season and competition
Club	Season	League			Cup		League Cup		Continental		Other		Total	
Club	Season	Division	Apps	Goals	Apps	Goals	Apps	Goals	Apps	Goals	Apps	Goals	Apps	Goals
Temperley	2017–18	Primera División	7	0	0	0	—		—		0	0	7	0
Temperley	2018–19	Primera B Nacional	6	0	2	0	—		—		0	0	8	0
Temperley	2019–20	Primera B Nacional	0	0	0	0	—		—		0	0	0	0
Temperley	2020	Primera B Nacional	0	0	0	0	—		—		0	0	0	0
Temperley	Total		13	0	2	0	—		—		0	0	15	0
Talleres (loan)	2019–20	Primera B Metropolitana	12	0	0	0	—		—		0	0	12	0
Don Benito (loan)	2020–21	Segunda División B	7	0	0	0	—		—		0	0	7	0
Career total			32	0	2	0	—		—		0	0	34	0
