= Federico Fattori =

Argentine footballer (born 1992)

Personal information
- Full name: Federico Fattori Mouzo
- Date of birth: 22 July 1992 (age 34)
- Place of birth: Buenos Aires
- Height: 1.78 m (5 ft 10 in)
- Position: Central midfielder

Team information
- Current team: Talleres
- Number: 8

Youth career
- Nueva Chicago

Senior career*
Years	Team	Apps	(Gls)
2013–2015	Nueva Chicago	31	(1)
2015–2017	Newell's Old Boys	6	(0)
2016–2017	→ Nueva Chicago (loan)	52	(1)
2017–2018	Nueva Chicago	10	(2)
2018–2021	Temperley	50	(1)
2021–2022	Ferro Carril Oeste	35	(0)
2022–2025	Huracán	93	(0)
2025–2026	Argentinos Juniors	49	(0)
2026–	Talleres	12	(0)
- * Club domestic league appearances and goals as of 17:37, 15 November 2026 (UTC)

Federico Fattori Mouzo (born 22 July 1992) is an Argentine professional footballer who plays as a central midfielder or defensive midfielder for Argentine Primera División club Talleres.

== Career ==
Fattori's career started in 2013 with Nueva Chicago in Primera B Metropolitana, his career debut versus Deportivo Merlo on 2 November was the first of fourteen appearances during the 2013–14 season which Nueva Chicago ended as champions. He scored his first goal in Primera B Nacional in October 2014 against Aldosivi. On 29 January 2015, Fattori signed for Newell's Old Boys of the Primera División. Six appearances followed, prior to Fattori returning to Nueva Chicago on loan in January 2016. He remained for two seasons and scored once in fifty-four matches. On 31 July 2017, Fattori rejoined permanently.

He scored on his second full-time debut for Nueva Chicago on 17 September, in a 1–1 draw with Independiente Rivadavia in Primera B Nacional. Six months after rejoining Nueva Chicago, Fattori left in January 2018 to play for Primera División side Temperley. He made eleven appearances, was sent off in his ninth, as they suffered relegation. He remained with them in the second tier for three more seasons, appearing forty-three times and scoring once; versus Estudiantes on 21 September 2019. On 25 February 2021, Fattori was signed by Primera Nacional counterparts Ferro Carril Oeste.

== Career statistics ==
As of 26 February 2021.

Club statistics
Club	Season	League			Cup		League Cup		Continental		Other		Total	
Club	Season	Division	Apps	Goals	Apps	Goals	Apps	Goals	Apps	Goals	Apps	Goals	Apps	Goals
Nueva Chicago	2013–14	Primera B Metropolitana	14	0	1	0	—		—		0	0	15	0
Nueva Chicago	2014	Primera B Nacional	17	1	0	0	—		—		2 (Note: Appearance(s) in the Primera Nacional play-offs)	0	19	1
Nueva Chicago	Total		31	1	1	0	—		—		2	0	34	1
Newell's Old Boys	2015	Primera División	6	0	0	0	—		—		0	0	6	0
Newell's Old Boys	2016	Primera División	0	0	0	0	—		—		0	0	0	0
Newell's Old Boys	2016–17	Primera División	0	0	0	0	—		—		0	0	0	0
Newell's Old Boys	Total		6	0	0	0	—		—		0	0	6	0
Nueva Chicago (loan)	2016	Primera B Nacional	20	0	0	0	—		—		0	0	20	0
Nueva Chicago (loan)	2016–17	Primera B Nacional	32	1	2	0	—		—		0	0	34	1
Nueva Chicago	2017–18	Primera B Nacional	10	2	0	0	—		—		0	0	10	2
Nueva Chicago	Total		62	3	2	0	—		—		0	0	64	3
Temperley	2017–18	Primera División	11	0	0	0	—		—		0	0	11	0
Temperley	2018–19	Primera Nacional	13	0	3	0	—		—		0	0	16	0
Temperley	2019–20	Primera Nacional	21	1	0	0	—		—		0	0	21	1
Temperley	2020	Primera Nacional	5	0	1	0	—		—		0	0	6	0
Temperley	Total		50	1	4	0	—		—		0	0	54	1
Ferro Carril Oeste	2021	Primera Nacional	0	0	0	0	—		—		0	0	0	0
Career total			149	5	7	0	—		—		2	0	158	5

== Honours ==
Nueva Chicago

- Primera B Metropolitana: 2013–14
