= Brian Puntano =

Argentine professional footballer

Personal information
- Full name: Brian Gabriel Puntano
- Date of birth: 11 May 1996 (age 30)
- Place of birth: Rosario, Argentina
- Height: 1.73 m (5 ft 8 in)
- Position: Forward

Youth career
- Newell's Old Boys
- Independiente
- 2017–2018: → Talleres (loan)
- 2018–2019: Temperley

Senior career*
| Years | Team | Apps | (Gls) |
| 2019 | Temperley | 1 | (0) |
| 2019–2020 | Sportivo Las Parejas | 13 | (0) |
| 2020–2021 | Deportivo Maipú | 3 | (0) |
- * Club domestic league appearances and goals as of 19:08, 14 August 2022 (UTC)

Brian Gabriel Puntano (born 11 May 1996) is an Argentine professional footballer who plays as a forward.

== Career ==
Puntano had youth stints with Newell's Old Boys, Independiente and, from August 2017 on loan, Talleres before joining Temperley in 2018; his senior career began in Primera B Nacional with the latter. He appeared for his professional debut on 20 April 2019, featuring for seventy minutes of a draw at home to Platense under manager Cristian Aldirico; he was replaced on the field by Federico Mazur.

== Career statistics ==
As of 21 April 2019.

Appearances and goals by club, season and competition
| Club | Season | League | | | Cup | | League Cup | | Continental | | Other | | Total | |
| Club | Season | Division | Apps | Goals | Apps | Goals | Apps | Goals | Apps | Goals | Apps | Goals | Apps | Goals |
|---|---|---|---|---|---|---|---|---|---|---|---|---|---|---|
| Temperley | 2018–19 | Primera B Nacional | 1 | 0 | 0 | 0 | — | | — | | 0 | 0 | 1 | 0 |
| Career total | | | 1 | 0 | 0 | 0 | — | | — | | 0 | 0 | 1 | 0 |
