= Gastón Corado =

Argentine footballer

Personal information
- Full name: Gastón Ezequiel Corado
- Date of birth: 5 February 1989 (age 37)
- Place of birth: Buenos Aires, Argentina
- Height: 1.85 m (6 ft 1 in)
- Position: Forward

Team information
- Current team: Torre del Mar

Senior career*
Years	Team	Apps	(Gls)
2010–2012	Berazategui	45	(6)
2013	General Lamadrid	18	(8)
2013–2014	Temperley	36	(5)
2014	Almagro	11	(0)
2015	Talleres RE	40	(21)
2015–2016	Unión San Felipe	10	(2)
2016–2017	Casertana	35	(9)
2017–2019	Matera	26	(1)
2018	→ Catanzaro (loan)	11	(1)
2019	Virtus Francavilla	8	(0)
2019–2020	Clodiense	6	(0)
2020	Casertana	4	(1)
2020–2021	Castrovillari	14	(8)
2021	Taranto	7	(3)
2021–2022	Gelbison	8	(1)
2022	Rotonda	14	(4)
2022	Pistoiese	2	(0)
2022–2023	Bitonto	10	(1)
2023–2024	Agropoli		
2024	Corato		
2024–2025	Nuova Spinazzola		
2025–	Torre del Mar	2	(1)
- * Club domestic league appearances and goals as of 2 November 2025

Gastón Ezequiel Corado (born 5 February 1989) is an Argentine footballer who also holds Italian citizenship who plays for Spanish Tercera Federación club Torre del Mar.

== Club career ==
He made his Primera B Metropolitana debut for Temperley on 6 August 2013 in a game against Deportivo Merlo.

On 4 February 2019, he signed with Virtus Francavilla.

On 31 January 2020, he returned to Casertana.

On 23 September 2020 he joined Castrovillari.
