= Nicolás Muscio =

Argentine professional footballer

Personal information
- Full name: Nicolás Agustín Muscio
- Date of birth: 18 February 1998 (age 28)
- Place of birth: Lanús, Argentina
- Height: 1.70 m (5 ft 7 in)
- Position: Midfielder

Team information
- Current team: Argentino de Quilmes

Youth career
- Atlético Pampero
- 2003–2019: Racing Club

Senior career*
Years	Team	Apps	(Gls)
2019–2021	Racing Club	0	(0)
2019–2021	→ Temperley (loan)	2	(0)
2021	→ Deportivo Armenio (loan)	12	(0)
2022–	Argentino de Quilmes	21	(0)
- * Club domestic league appearances and goals as of 08:11, 20 August 2022 (UTC)

Nicolás Agustín Muscio (born 18 February 1998) is an Argentine professional footballer who plays as a midfielder for Argentino de Quilmes.

== Career ==
Muscio is a product of Racing Club's academy, having joined in 2003 from Atlético Pampero. His breakthrough into senior football arrived under manager Eduardo Coudet in May 2019, as he was selected as a substitute for a Copa de la Superliga quarter-final with Tigre. He subsequently made his professional debut in the second leg encounter, replacing Nery Domínguez after seventy-eight minutes.

== Career statistics ==
As of 15 May 2019.

Appearances and goals by club, season and competition
Club	Season	League			Cup		League Cup		Continental		Other		Total	
Club	Season	Division	Apps	Goals	Apps	Goals	Apps	Goals	Apps	Goals	Apps	Goals	Apps	Goals
Racing Club	2018–19	Primera División	0	0	0	0	1	0	0	0	0	0	1	0
Career total			0	0	0	0	1	0	0	0	0	0	1	0
