= Marcos Martinich =

Argentine footballer

Personal information
- Full name: Marcos Daniel Martinich
- Date of birth: 8 August 1996 (age 30)
- Place of birth: Bigand, Argentina
- Height: 1.75 m (5 ft 9 in)
- Position: Left-back

Team information
- Current team: Cienciano
- Number: 24

Senior career*
Years	Team	Apps	(Gls)
2017–2019	Rosario Central	0	(0)
2016	→ Talleres (loan)	0	(0)
2017–2019	→ Villa Dálmine (loan)	24	(0)
2019–2020	Temperley	1	(0)
2020	Santos de Nasca	8	(1)
2021–	Sportivo Ameliano	80	(0)
- * Club domestic league appearances and goals as of 13 August 2025

Marcos Daniel Martinich (born 8 August 1996) is an Argentine professional footballer who plays as a left-back for Cienciano.

== Career ==
Martinich started his career in the ranks of Primera División side Rosario Central. In August 2016, Martinich was loaned to Talleres. However, he didn't feature for the Primera División club in senior football and returned to Rosario Central months after joining. On 5 September 2017, Villa Dálmine completed the loan signing of Martinich. He made his professional debut on 16 September during a 2–0 victory over Boca Unidos. Martinich remained there for two seasons, appearing in a total of twenty-seven matches; he also scored his first senior goal, netting in a Copa Argentina defeat away to River Plate on 29 July 2018.

July 2019 saw Martinich sign for fellow Primera B Nacional team Temperley in a permanent deal. He appeared just once for the club, in a home loss to Ferro Carril Oeste in December, in a season that was ended early due to the COVID-19 pandemic. In September 2020, Martinich moved abroad to join Peruvian Segunda División side Santos. He scored his first goal for them in a 4–3 defeat to Unión Comercio on 18 November, having made his debut a few weeks prior against Cultural Santa Rosa.

== Career statistics ==
As of 23 December 2020.

Club statistics
Club	Season	League			Cup		League Cup		Continental		Other		Total	
Club	Season	Division	Apps	Goals	Apps	Goals	Apps	Goals	Apps	Goals	Apps	Goals	Apps	Goals
Rosario Central	2016–17	Primera División	0	0	0	0	—		—		0	0	0	0
Rosario Central	2017–18	Primera División	0	0	0	0	—		0	0	0	0	0	0
Rosario Central	Total		0	0	0	0	—		0	0	0	0	0	0
Talleres (loan)	2016–17	Primera División	0	0	0	0	—		—		0	0	0	0
Villa Dálmine (loan)	2017–18	Primera B Nacional	6	0	0	0	—		—		1 (Note: Appearance(s) in Primera B Nacional play-offs)	0	7	0
Villa Dálmine (loan)	2018–19	Primera B Nacional	17	0	3	1	—		—		0	0	20	1
Villa Dálmine (loan)	Total		23	0	3	1	—		—		1	0	27	1
Temperley	2019–20	Primera B Nacional	1	0	0	0	—		—		0	0	1	0
Santos	2020	Segunda División	8	1	0	0	—		—		0	0	8	1
Career total			32	1	3	1	—		0	0	1	0	36	2
