= Daniel Vega (footballer, born 1981) =

Argentine footballer (born 1981)

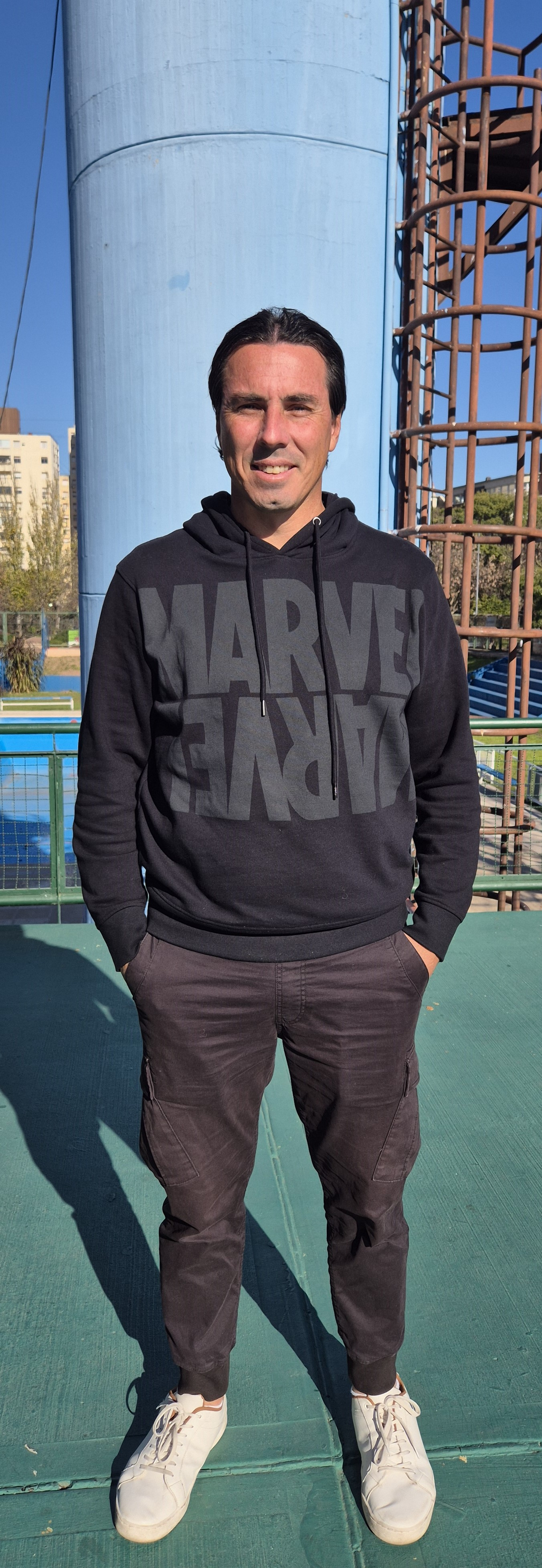

Personal information
- Full name: Daniel Vega
- Date of birth: October 19, 1981 (age 45)
- Place of birth: Buenos Aires, Argentina
- Height: 1.79 m (5 ft 10 in)
- Position: Forward

Senior career*
Years	Team	Apps	(Gls)
2002–2003	Platense	27	(4)
2003–2004	Estudiantes (BA)	41	(13)
2004–2005	Los Andes	75	(36)
2005–2007	Platense	53	(35)
2008	Emelec	19	(2)
2008–2009	San Martín de Tucumán	23	(5)
2009–2010	Godoy Cruz	20	(3)
2010	San Martín de Tucumán	9	(1)
2011–2012	Almirante Brown	37	(14)
2012–2013	Huracán	27	(4)
2013–2016	Platense	106	(31)
2016–2017	Talleres Remedios	35	(18)
2017–2019	Platense	51	(16)
2019–2020	UAI Urquiza		
2020–2021	Platense	2	(0)
Total		525	(182)
- * Club domestic league appearances and goals as of 00:43, 27 July 2019 (UTC)

Daniel Alejandro Vega (born 19 October 1981) is a former Argentine footballer who played as a forward.

== Career ==
Vega played several years and for various teams in the lower league Primera B Metropolitana and in 2007 he played for Platense in the Primera B Nacional, both in Argentina. In Platense, he was the top goal scorer with 13 goals.

Subsequently, Vega joined Ecuadorian club Emelec. He scored his first goal with Emelec on his debut on the Ecuadorian League against Macará. In that game he also made the assist in fellow striker Gonzalo Ludueña's goal.

== Personal life ==
Vega is a family-oriented man. When he was signed by Ecuadorian side Emelec he arrived to Guayaquil with both his parents, his sister and his soon to be wife, Lorena. In December 2007 Vega received a degree as a Public Accountant and according to him, getting that degree was the main reason why he did not leave Argentina earlier, despite all the offers from abroad he has had in his career.

== Playing style ==
Vega has demonstrated to be a strong header, and is as accurate with his left foot as he is his right when finishing a play. According to fan feedback, he plays better near the opposite goal.

== Honours ==
Platense

- Primera B Metropolitana: 2005–06, 2017–18
