= Mauro Cerutti =

Argentine professional footballer

Personal information
- Full name: Mauro Ezequiel Cerutti
- Date of birth: 29 March 1994 (age 32)
- Place of birth: Mendoza, Argentina
- Height: 1.68 m (5 ft 6 in)
- Position: Midfielder

Team information
- Current team: Heraclea

Youth career
- Independiente Rivadavia

Senior career*
Years	Team	Apps	(Gls)
2014–2017	Independiente Rivadavia	58	(2)
2018–2020	Temperley	37	(2)
2020–2021	Panachaiki	25	(0)
2021	Deportivo Maipú	8	(0)
2021–2023	Martina	33	(1)
2023–2025	Casarano	56	(3)
2025–	Heraclea	0	(0)
- * Club domestic league appearances and goals as of 4 May 2025

Mauro Ezequiel Cerutti (born 29 March 1994) is an Argentine professional footballer who plays as a midfielder for Italian Serie D club Heraclea.

== Career ==
Cerutti began his career with Independiente Rivadavia. A twelve-minute appearance in the Copa Argentina against Almirante Brown in April 2014 saw Cerutti make his bow in senior football, replacing Héctor Cardozo in a defeat at the Estadio San Juan del Bicentenario. He made his debut in Primera B Nacional versus Crucero del Norte in the succeeding June, which lasted just forty-five minutes after he received a red card on the brink of half-time. Sixty total appearances followed across the next five seasons, with the midfielder netting his opening career goals against Juventud Unida and Argentinos Juniors in the process.

Cerutti left Independiente Rivadavia on 31 December 2017 after rejecting a new contract, though was unable to join a new club due to disagreements with his former team. Cerutti, who is of Italian descent, joined second tier side Temperley on a free transfer on 30 June 2018; having trained with them since February. He remained for two seasons, making forty-one appearances in all competitions; he also scored two goals, with both arriving in December 2018 against Deportivo Morón and Independiente Rivadavia respectively. In August 2020, Cerutti moved abroad with Super League Greece 2 team Panachaiki.

== Career statistics ==
As of 15 May 2021.

Appearances and goals by club, season and competition
Club	Season	League			Cup		League Cup		Continental		Other		Total	
Club	Season	Division	Apps	Goals	Apps	Goals	Apps	Goals	Apps	Goals	Apps	Goals	Apps	Goals
Independiente Rivadavia	2013–14	Primera B Nacional	1	0	1	0	—		—		0	0	2	0
Independiente Rivadavia	2014	Primera B Nacional	2	0	0	0	—		—		0	0	2	0
Independiente Rivadavia	2015	Primera B Nacional	17	0	2	0	—		—		0	0	19	0
Independiente Rivadavia	2016	Primera B Nacional	8	0	0	0	—		—		0	0	8	0
Independiente Rivadavia	2016–17	Primera B Nacional	23	2	1	0	—		—		0	0	24	2
Independiente Rivadavia	2017–18	Primera B Nacional	7	0	0	0	—		—		0	0	7	0
Independiente Rivadavia	Total		58	2	4	0	—		—		0	0	62	2
Temperley	2018–19	Primera B Nacional	20	2	4	0	—		—		0	0	24	2
Temperley	2019–20	Primera B Nacional	17	0	0	0	—		—		0	0	17	0
Temperley	Total		37	2	4	0	—		—		0	0	41	2
Panachaiki	2020–21	Super League 2	25	0	0	0	—		—		0	0	25	0
Career total			120	4	8	0	—		—		0	0	128	4
