= Ezequiel Spinella =

Argentine footballer

Personal information
- Full name: Ezequiel Marcelo Spinella
- Date of birth: 23 October 1999 (age 27)
- Place of birth: Argentina
- Position: Defender

Team information
- Current team: Centro Español

Youth career
- Quilmes
- 2015–2018: Temperley

Senior career*
Years	Team	Apps	(Gls)
2018–2019	Temperley	1	(0)
2021–	Centro Español		
- * Club domestic league appearances and goals

Ezequiel Marcelo Spinella (born 23 October 1999) is an Argentine professional footballer who plays as a defender for Centro Español.

== Career ==
Spinella played for the Quilmes academy, prior to joining the ranks of Temperley; where he made the breakthrough into the first-team during 2018–19 under manager Gastón Esmerado. He made his professional bow with a six-minute cameo in a Primera División victory away to Belgrano on 12 May 2018; as Temperley were relegated to Primera B Nacional. Another substitute appearance arrived in the succeeding October versus San Lorenzo in the Copa Argentina. He was released at the end of 2019.

== Career statistics ==
As of 17 July 2020.

Appearances and goals by club, season and competition
Club	Season	League			Cup		League Cup		Continental		Other		Total	
Club	Season	Division	Apps	Goals	Apps	Goals	Apps	Goals	Apps	Goals	Apps	Goals	Apps	Goals
Temperley	2017–18	Primera División	1	0	0	0	—		—		0	0	1	0
Temperley	2018–19	Primera B Nacional	0	0	1	0	—		—		0	0	1	0
Temperley	2019–20	Primera B Nacional	0	0	0	0	—		—		0	0	0	0
Career total			1	0	1	0	—		—		0	0	2	0
