= Mauro González =

Argentine footballer (born 1996)

Personal information
- Full name: Mauro Ezequiel González
- Date of birth: 31 August 1996 (age 30)
- Place of birth: Lanús, Argentina
- Height: 1.78 m (5 ft 10 in)
- Position: Midfielder

Team information
- Current team: Luis Ángel Firpo

Youth career
- Boca Juniors

Senior career*
Years	Team	Apps	(Gls)
2014–2018	Boca Juniors	3	(0)
2015–2016	→ Slovan Bratislava (loan)	16	(1)
2016–2017	→ Talleres II (loan)	–	(–)
2017–2018	→ Chacarita Juniors (loan)	9	(0)
2018–2019	Almagro	11	(0)
2019–2020	Temperley	18	(2)
2020–2021	Patronato	6	(0)
2021	Universidad de Concepción	27	(2)
2022	Cobresal	20	(0)
2023	Deportes Temuco	26	(0)
2024–2025	Rangers	32	(7)
2025	Al-Ain	13	(2)
2025	San Martín Tucumán	7	(0)
2026	Rangers	4	(1)
2026–	Luis Ángel Firpo	0	(0)
- * Club domestic league appearances and goals as of 26 July 2026

Mauro Ezequiel González (born 31 August 1996), commonly known as Mauro González is an Argentine professional footballer who plays as a midfielder for Salvadoran club Luis Ángel Firpo.

== Club career ==
On 25 July 2015, ŠK Slovan Bratislava official website announced arrival of Mauro González on a one-year loan with option to buy from Boca Juniors. He made his professional Fortuna Liga debut for Slovan Bratislava against Spartak Myjava on 26 July 2015. Subsequently, he was loaned to Talleres de Córdoba.

For the 2024 season, he signed with Rangers de Talca from Deportes Temuco.

On 1 February 2025, González joined Al-Ain.

After a stint with San Martín de Tucumán, González returned to Rangers for the 2026 season. In May of the same year, he was released after suffering a car accident on 20 March.

Following Rangers de Talca, González moved to El Salvador to play for Luis Ángel Firpo.
