= Enzo Salas =

Argentine professional footballer

Personal information
- Full name: Enzo Marcelo Salas
- Date of birth: 7 September 2000 (age 26)
- Place of birth: Concordia, Argentina
- Position: Forward

Team information
- Current team: Academia Mascherano

Youth career
- Comunicaciones Concordia
- Club Salto Grande
- Gimnasia y Esgrima
- 2016–2019: Temperley

Senior career*
Years	Team	Apps	(Gls)
2019–2021	Temperley	1	(0)
2021–	Academia Mascherano		
- * Club domestic league appearances and goals as of 18:37, 21 April 2019 (UTC)

Enzo Marcelo Salas (born 7 September 2000) is an Argentine professional footballer who plays as a forward for Academia Mascherano.

== Career ==
After spells with Comunicaciones Concordia and Club Salto Grande, Salas played in the youth system of Gimnasia y Esgrima up until 2016 as he moved to Temperley. His breakthrough into their first-team came three years later during the 2018–19 Primera B Nacional campaign, with his first taste of senior football coming when he was an unused substitute for a fixture with Sarmiento in February 2019. Salas' professional bow arrived on 20 April, with Cristian Aldirico picking him off the bench after seventy-six minutes of a 1–1 draw with Platense.

== Career statistics ==
As of 21 April 2019.

Appearances and goals by club, season and competition
Club	Season	League			Cup		League Cup		Continental		Other		Total	
Club	Season	Division	Apps	Goals	Apps	Goals	Apps	Goals	Apps	Goals	Apps	Goals	Apps	Goals
Temperley	2018–19	Primera B Nacional	1	0	0	0	—		—		0	0	1	0
Career total			1	0	0	0	—		—		0	0	1	0
