= Lautaro Rinaldi =

Argentine footballer

Personal information
- Date of birth: 30 December 1993 (age 32)
- Place of birth: Acassuso, Argentina
- Height: 1.80 m (5 ft 11 in)
- Position: Forward

Team information
- Current team: Rampla Juniors
- Number: 7

Youth career
- Argentinos Juniors

Senior career*
Years	Team	Apps	(Gls)
2014–2016	Argentinos Juniors	47	(13)
2016–2017	Panathinaikos	8	(0)
2017–2018	Brescia	6	(0)
2018	Veracruz	0	(0)
2019	Universidad San Martín	4	(0)
2019–2020	Temperley	10	(1)
2020–2022	Aldosivi	9	(1)
2022–2023	WSG Tirol	12	(1)
2022–2023	WSG Tirol II	4	(4)
2024	Deportes La Serena	14	(2)
2024–	Rampla Juniors	4	(2)
- * Club domestic league appearances and goals as of 14 September 2024

Lautaro Rinaldi (born 30 December 1993) is an Argentine footballer who plays as a forward for Uruguayan club Rampla Juniors. He also holds Italian citizenship.

== Club career ==
Rinaldi is a youth exponent from Argentinos Juniors. He made his league debut at 15 February 2015 against Atlético Rafaela in a 2–0 home win. He replaced Gonzalo Castillejos after 65 minutes. On 25 July 2016, Panathinaikos is eager to sign the Argentinian striker. According to "tuttob.com" Italian website, Argentinos Juniors' striker rejected Hellas Verona's transfer bid because of Panathinaikos. Technical director of the Greens, Gilberto Silva, is eager to sign the 23-year-old Argentine, and it seems that Lautaro Rinaldi also prefers to continue his career in the Greek Super League. Eventually, on 5 August 2016, the young Argentine striker was signed from Argentine club Argentinos Juniors who were relegated to the second tier in Argentina on a four-year contract for a fee of €300,000. However, despite the big prospects could not find a regular place in the squad and the Argentinian striker has been considering a move as a loan, to either MLS or Qatar in the summer transfer window. On 31 August 2017, he signed with Serie B club Brescia. On 20 June 2022, he joined Austrian Bundesliga club WSG Tirol.

In 2024, he moved to Chile and joined Deportes La Serena.
