= Gastón Esmerado =

Argentine footballer and manager

Personal information
- Full name: Gastón Rubén Esmerado
- Date of birth: February 8, 1978 (age 48)
- Place of birth: Lomas de Zamora, Argentina
- Height: 1.82 m (6 ft 0 in)
- Position: Defensive midfielder

Team information
- Current team: Almagro (Manager)

Senior career*
Years	Team	Apps	(Gls)
1996–1997	Lanús	3	(0)
1997–1998	Olimpo	43	(1)
1999–2005	Arsenal de Sarandí	224	(15)
2006	Estudiantes	11	(0)
2006–2007	Colón	31	(5)
2007–2008	Skoda Xanthi	5	(0)
2008–2010	Huracán	55	(3)
2010–2015	Arsenal de Sarandi	42	(1)

Managerial career
- 2016–2017: Guillermo Brown
- 2017–2018: Temperley
- 2019: Almagro
- 2019: Nueva Chicago
- 2019–: Almagro
- * Club domestic league appearances and goals

Gastón Rubén Esmerado (born 8 February 1978 in Lomas de Zamora) is a retired Argentine footballer and current manager of Club Almagro.

== Career ==
Esmerado, nicknamed "Gato" started his playing career in 1996 with Club Atlético Lanús, he only played 3 games in the Argentine Primera before stepping down a division to play for Olimpo de Bahía Blanca in the Primera B Nacional.

In 1999, he joined Arsenal de Sarandí where he was part of the team that won promotion to the Primera for the first time in their history in 2002, he played for the club until 2005. he played 224 times for Arsenal scoring 15 goals, 119 of his appearances for the club came in the Argentine Primera.

In 2006, he joined Estudiantes de La Plata but soon moved on to join Colón de Santa Fe where he played until the end of 2007. in 2008 he had a brief spell with Greek side Skoda Xanthi before returning to Argentina to play for Club Atlético Huracán.

== Honours ==
Arsenal

- Argentine Primera División: 2012 Clausura
