= Federico Mazur =

Argentine footballer (born 1993)

Personal information
- Full name: Federico Mazur
- Date of birth: 14 May 1993 (age 33)
- Place of birth: Buenos Aires, Argentina
- Position: Centre back

Team information
- Current team: Barracas Central

Youth career
- All Boys

Senior career*
Years	Team	Apps	(Gls)
2014	Shkumbini Peqin	8	(0)
2014	Espinho	5	(0)
2015	Atlético Camioneros	4	(0)
2016	Ferro Carril Oeste	3	(0)
2016–2017	Estudiantes	22	(1)
2017–2018	UAI Urquiza	23	(3)
2018–2019	Temperley	20	(2)
2019	Gimnasia Mendoza	8	(0)
2020–	Barracas Central	2	(0)
- * Club domestic league appearances and goals as of 09:24, 19 May 2020 (UTC)

Federico Mazur (born 14 May 1993) is an Argentine professional footballer who plays as a defender for Barracas Central.

== Career ==
Mazur, after a youth stint with All Boys, began his career with Albania's Shkumbini Peqin. He appeared eight times in the 2013–14 Albanian First Division season, including for his senior bow on 15 February 2014 as they won 3–4 against Kamza. Mazur left at the end of the campaign as they finished seventh, with the defender subsequently joining Espinho of Portugal's Campeonato Nacional on 31 July. Five league appearances followed, along with one in a Taça de Portugal loss to Sporting CP. Mazur returned to Argentina in 2015 with Torneo Federal B's Atlético Camioneros. In 2016, Ferro Carril Oeste signed Mazur; a team of his brother's.

After an overall of just seven appearances for Atlético Camioneros and Ferro Carril Oeste, Mazur moved to Primera B Metropolitana side Estudiantes. One goal, versus Excursionistas, in twenty-four matches subsequently occurred. For the 2017–18 campaign, Mazur played for fellow third tier team UAI Urquiza. Goals against Sacachispas, Almirante Brown, Atlanta, Estudiantes, his former club, and Defensores de Belgrano arrived as UAI Urquiza lost in the promotion play-off finals to the aforementioned Defensores de Belgrano. On 14 June 2018, Mazur joined Temperley in Primera B Nacional.

On 14 December 2019, Barracas Central announced the signing of Mazur.

== Personal life ==
Mazur's brother, Rodrigo, is also a professional footballer.

== Career statistics ==
As of 30 December 2018.

Club statistics
Club	Season	League			Cup		Continental		Other		Total	
Club	Season	Division	Apps	Goals	Apps	Goals	Apps	Goals	Apps	Goals	Apps	Goals
Shkumbini Peqin	2013–14	First Division	8	0	0	0	—		0	0	8	0
Espinho	2014–15	Campeonato Nacional	5	0	1	0	—		0	0	6	0
Atlético Camioneros	2015	Torneo Federal B	4	0	0	0	—		0	0	4	0
Ferro Carril Oeste	2016	Primera B Nacional	3	0	0	0	—		0	0	3	0
Estudiantes	2016–17	Primera B Metropolitana	22	1	0	0	—		2 (Note: Appearance(s) in the Primera B Metropolitana play-offs)	0	24	1
UAI Urquiza	2017–18	Primera B Metropolitana	23	3	0	0	—		5	2	28	5
Temperley	2018–19	Primera B Nacional	10	1	4	2	—		0	0	14	3
Career total			75	5	5	2	—		7	2	87	9
