= Alexis Vega (footballer, born 1993) =

Argentine footballer

Personal information
- Date of birth: 1 May 1993 (age 33)
- Place of birth: Trenque Lauquen, Argentina
- Height: 1.67 m (5 ft 5 1/2 in)
- Position: Midfielder

Team information
- Current team: Arsenal Sarandí

Youth career
- Tigre
- Defensores de Belgrano

Senior career*
Years	Team	Apps	(Gls)
2015	El Porvenir	32	(0)
2016–2017	All Boys	51	(0)
2018	San Marcos	28	(3)
2019	Brown	13	(0)
2019–2020	Temperley	12	(1)
2020–2021	Chacarita Juniors	34	(2)
2022	Deportivo Riestra	11	(0)
2022	Santamarina	18	(1)
2023	Güemes	12	(0)
2023–2024	San Martín SJ	16	(2)
2024–2026	All Boys	17	(2)
2026–	Arsenal Sarandí	6	(0)
- * Club domestic league appearances and goals as of 18:28, 25 March 2026 (UTC)

Alexis Vega (born 1 May 1993) is an Argentine professional footballer who plays as a midfielder for Arsenal Sarandí.

== Career ==
Vega had youth stints with Tigre and Defensores de Belgrano. He then joined El Porvenir, where he featured thirty-two times in Primera D Metropolitana. 2016 saw Vega join All Boys. After making his professional league bow on 20 February against Villa Dálmine, the midfielder went on to make fifty-two appearances in three Primera B Nacional seasons. Midway through 2017–18, Vega signed with Primera B de Chile side San Marcos. His sole campaign with them, 2018, concluded with relegation to the Segunda División, with him scoring goals against Deportes Copiapó, Santiago Morning and Deportes Valdivia across twenty-eight matches.

Vega returned to Argentina with Brown in January 2019.

== Career statistics ==
As of 3 February 2019.

Club statistics
Club	Season	League			Cup		Continental		Other		Total	
Club	Season	Division	Apps	Goals	Apps	Goals	Apps	Goals	Apps	Goals	Apps	Goals
El Porvenir	2015	Primera D Metropolitana	32	0	1	0	—		0	0	33	0
All Boys	2016	Primera B Nacional	7	0	0	0	—		0	0	7	0
All Boys	2016–17	Primera B Nacional	35	0	1	0	—		0	0	36	0
All Boys	2017–18	Primera B Nacional	9	0	0	0	—		0	0	9	0
All Boys	Total		51	0	1	0	—		0	0	52	0
San Marcos	2018	Primera B	28	3	6	2	—		0	0	34	5
Brown	2018–19	Primera B Nacional	1	0	0	0	—		0	0	1	0
Career total			80	3	8	2	—		0	0	88	5
