= Patricio Romero =

Argentine footballer

Personal information
- Date of birth: 24 March 1993 (age 33)
- Place of birth: Argentina
- Height: 1.79 m (5 ft 10 in)
- Position: Left back

Team information
- Current team: Talleres RE

Senior career*
Years	Team	Apps	(Gls)
2013–	Temperley	55	(1)
2017–2018	→ Juventud Unida (loan)	16	(0)
2018–2019	→ Estudiantes BA (loan)	22	(1)
2019–	Talleres RE	165	(2)
- * Club domestic league appearances and goals as of 17:52, 21 August 2025 (UTC)

Patricio Romero (born 24 March 1993) is an Argentine footballer who plays for Talleres de Remedios de Escalada as a defender.
