= Leo Fernández =

Argentine footballer and manager

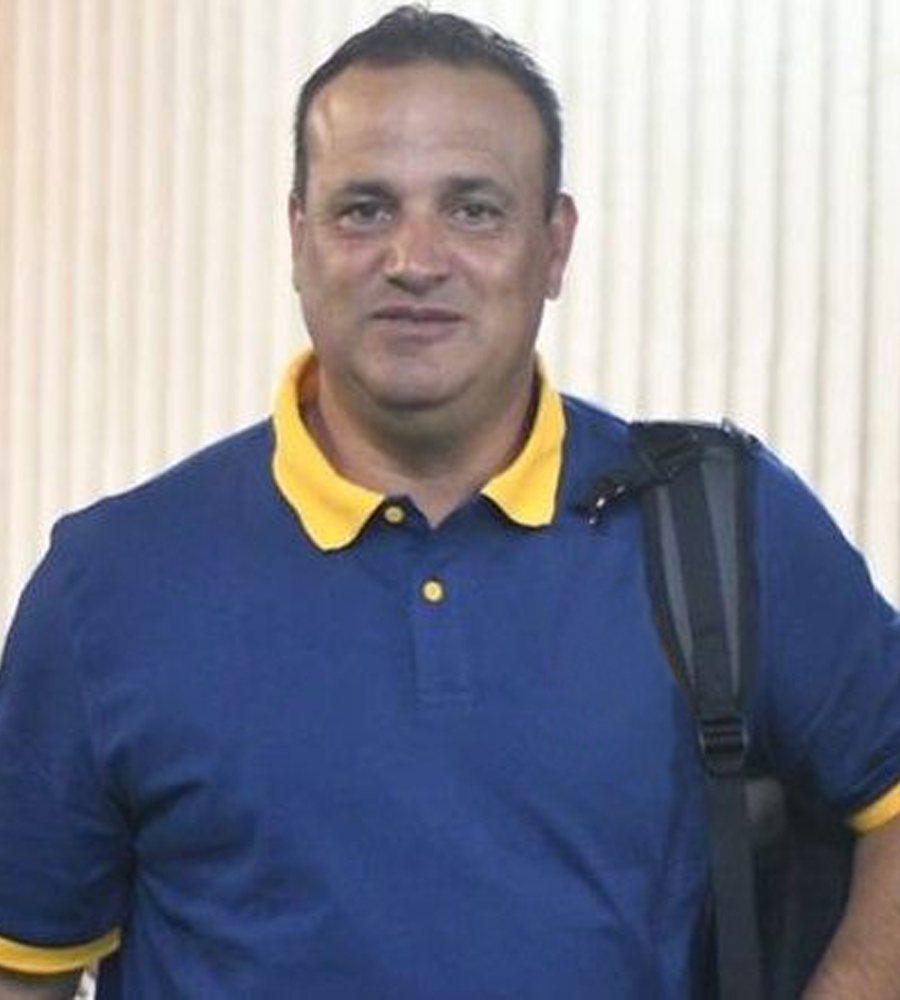

Personal information
- Full name: Leonardo Carlos Fernández
- Date of birth: 16 March 1972 (age 54)
- Place of birth: Rosario, Argentina
- Position: Left back

Youth career
- Rosario Central
- Renato Cesarini

Senior career*
Years	Team	Apps	(Gls)
1992–1993	Renato Cesarini	0	(0)
1993–1994	River Plate	0	(0)
1994–1995	Ferro Carril Oeste		
1995–1996	Central Córdoba		
1996–1997	Gimnasia y Tiro		
1997	Central Córdoba		
1998	Gimnasia y Tiro		
1999	Aldosivi		
1999	Tiro Federal		

Managerial career
- 2000–20XX: Belgrano de Oliveros (youth)
- Renato Cesarini
- 2009: Tiro Federal
- 2010–2011: Atlético Pujato
- 2012: Coronel Aguirre
- 2013–2017: Rosario Central (youth)
- 2016: Rosario Central (interim)
- 2017: Rosario Central (interim)
- 2018: Rosario Central
- * Club domestic league appearances and goals

Leonardo Carlos "Leo" Fernández (born 16 March 1972) is an Argentine retired footballer who played as a left back, and is a manager.

== Career ==
Born in Rosario, Santa Fe, Fernández played as a left back during his career. After graduating with Club Renato Cesarini's youth setup, he notably represented River Plate (but only appearing for the reserve side), Central Córdoba, Gimnasia y Tiro, Aldosivi and Tiro Federal. He retired with the latter in 1999.

In 2000, shortly after retiring, Fernández started working as a manager, taking over Club Sportivo Belgrano de Oliveros' youth squads. He was later in charge of Renato Cesarini, Tiro Federal, Atlético Pujato and Coronel Aguirre before joining Rosario Central's youth setup in 2013.

On 16 December 2016, after the dismissal of Eduardo Coudet, Fernández was named interim manager of the first team. His first professional match in charge occurred two days later, a 2–0 win against Belgrano. After the appointment of Paolo Montero, he returned to his previous duties.

On 11 November 2017, Fernández was again interim in the place of Montero. He was definitely appointed manager on 27 December, but resigned the following 28 April.
