= Federico Crivelli =

Argentine footballer (born 1982)

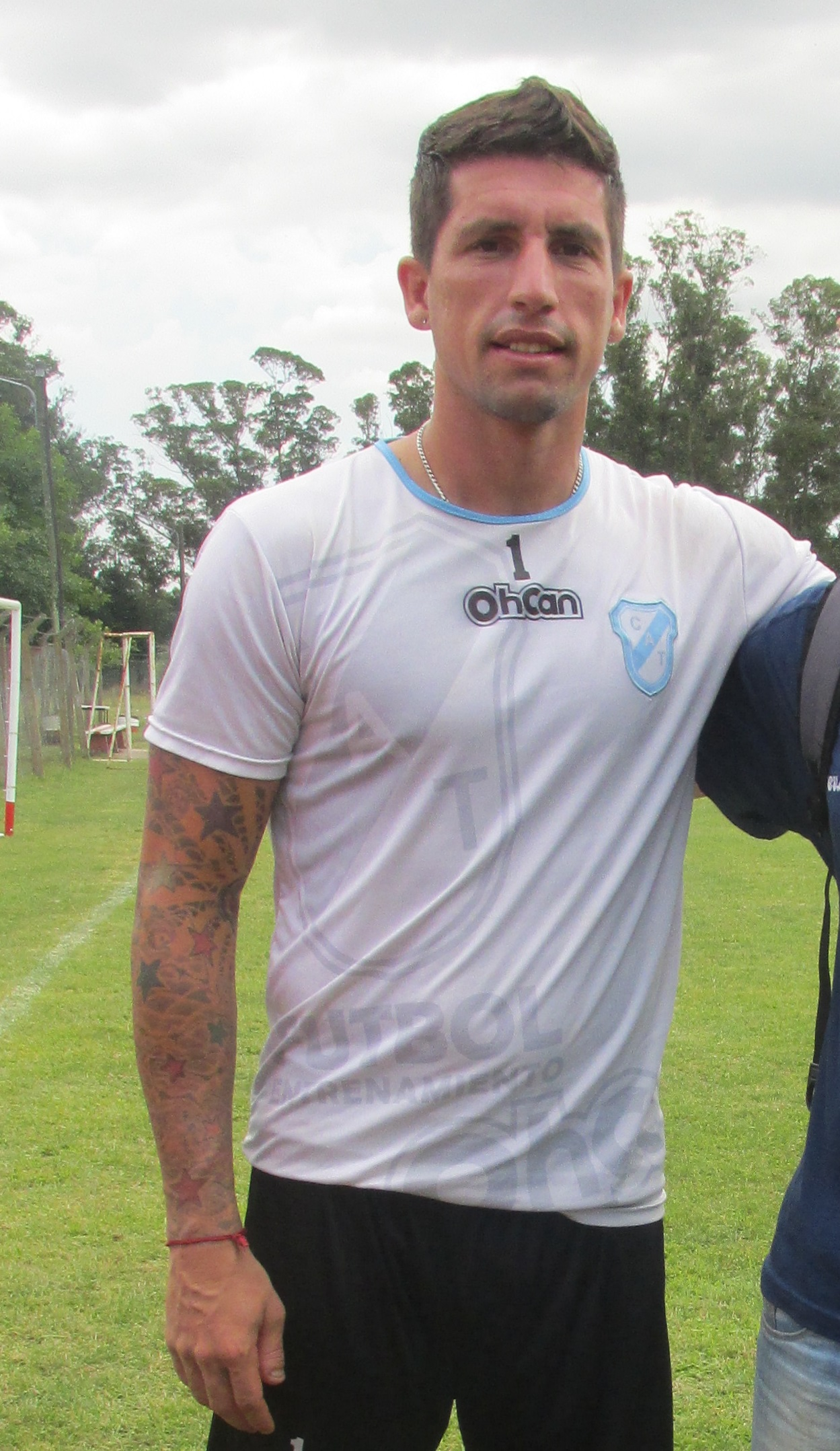

Personal information
- Full name: Federico Javier Crivelli
- Date of birth: 28 January 1982 (age 44)
- Place of birth: Adrogué, Argentina
- Height: 1.86 m (6 ft 1 in)
- Position: Goalkeeper

Youth career
- Temperley

Senior career*
Years	Team	Apps	(Gls)
2002–2010	Temperley	295	(0)
2010–2011	Talleres de Córdoba	35	(0)
2011–2012	Gimnasia Jujuy	17	(0)
2012–2016	Temperley	143	(0)
2016–2017	Chiapas	1	(0)
2017–2018	Tigre	13	(0)
2019	Boca Unidos	1	(0)
2019–2022	Temperley	17	(0)
- * Club domestic league appearances and goals as of 1 January 2023

Federico Javier Crivelli (born January 28, 1982) is an Argentine former footballer who played as a goalkeeper; his last team was Club Atlético Temperley.
