= Matías Castro (footballer, born 1987) =

Uruguayan footballer (born 1987)

Personal information
- Full name: Matías Fidel Castro Fuentes
- Date of birth: 24 October 1987 (age 39)
- Place of birth: Canelones, Uruguay
- Height: 1.83 m (6 ft 0 in)
- Position: Goalkeeper

Team information
- Current team: Progreso
- Number: 1

Youth career
- Liverpool Montevideo

Senior career*
Years	Team	Apps	(Gls)
2009–2014	Liverpool Montevideo	98	(0)
2014–2019	Unión Santa Fe	46	(0)
2018–2019	→ Temperley (loan)	18	(0)
2019	Temperley	15	(0)
2020–2021	Defensor	41	(0)
2022–2023	Temperley	53	(0)
2024–	Progreso	0	(0)
- * Club domestic league appearances and goals as of 14 September 2024

Matías Fidel Castro Fuentes (born 24 October 1987) is a Uruguayan footballer who plays for Uruguayan Primera División club Progreso.
