= Estadio Alfredo Beranger =

Football stadium in Turdera, Argentina

Coordinates: 34°46′56″S 58°23′58″W

Alfredo Beranger Stadium
- Estadio Alfredo Beranger
- El Teatro de Turdera
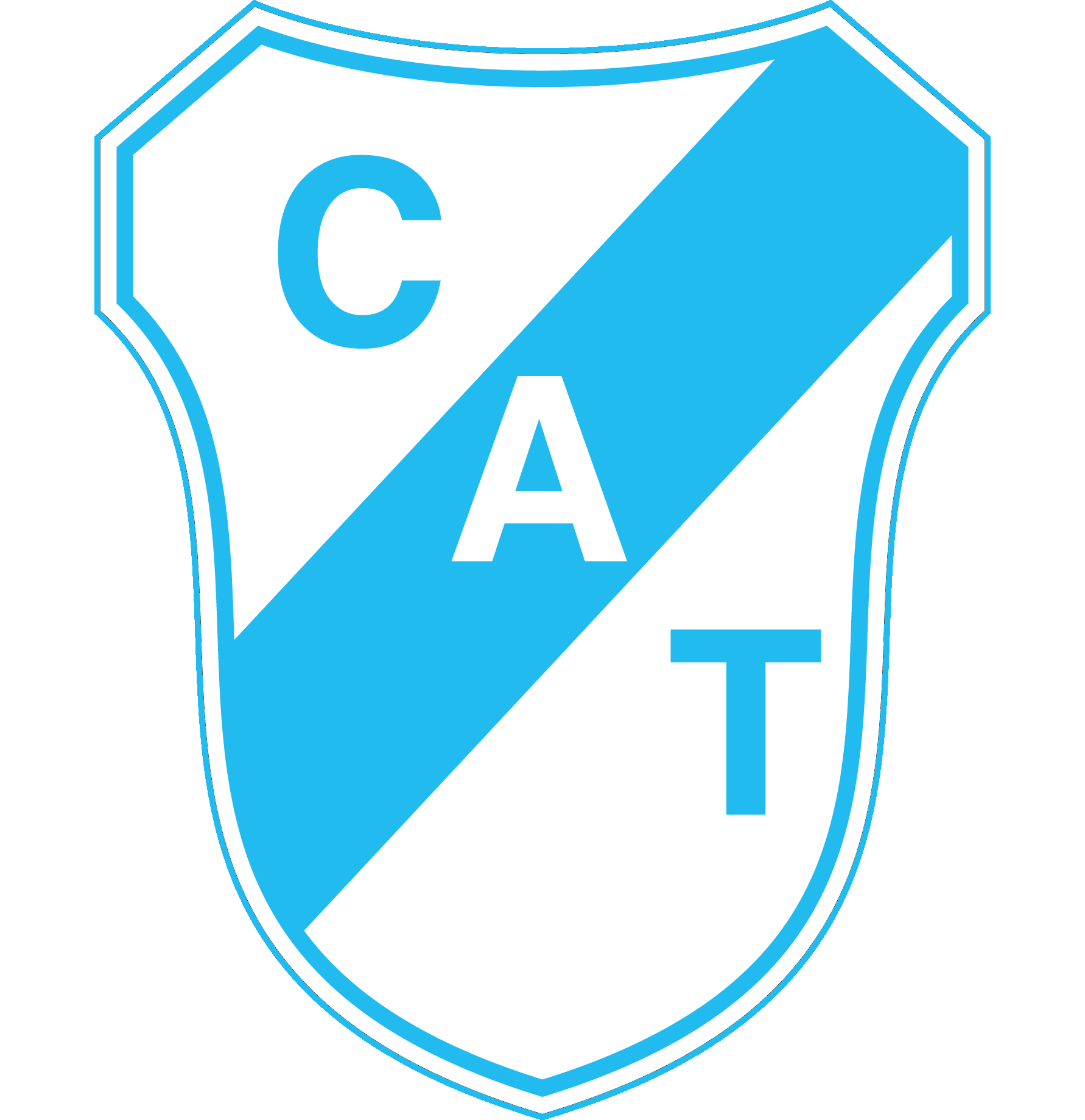

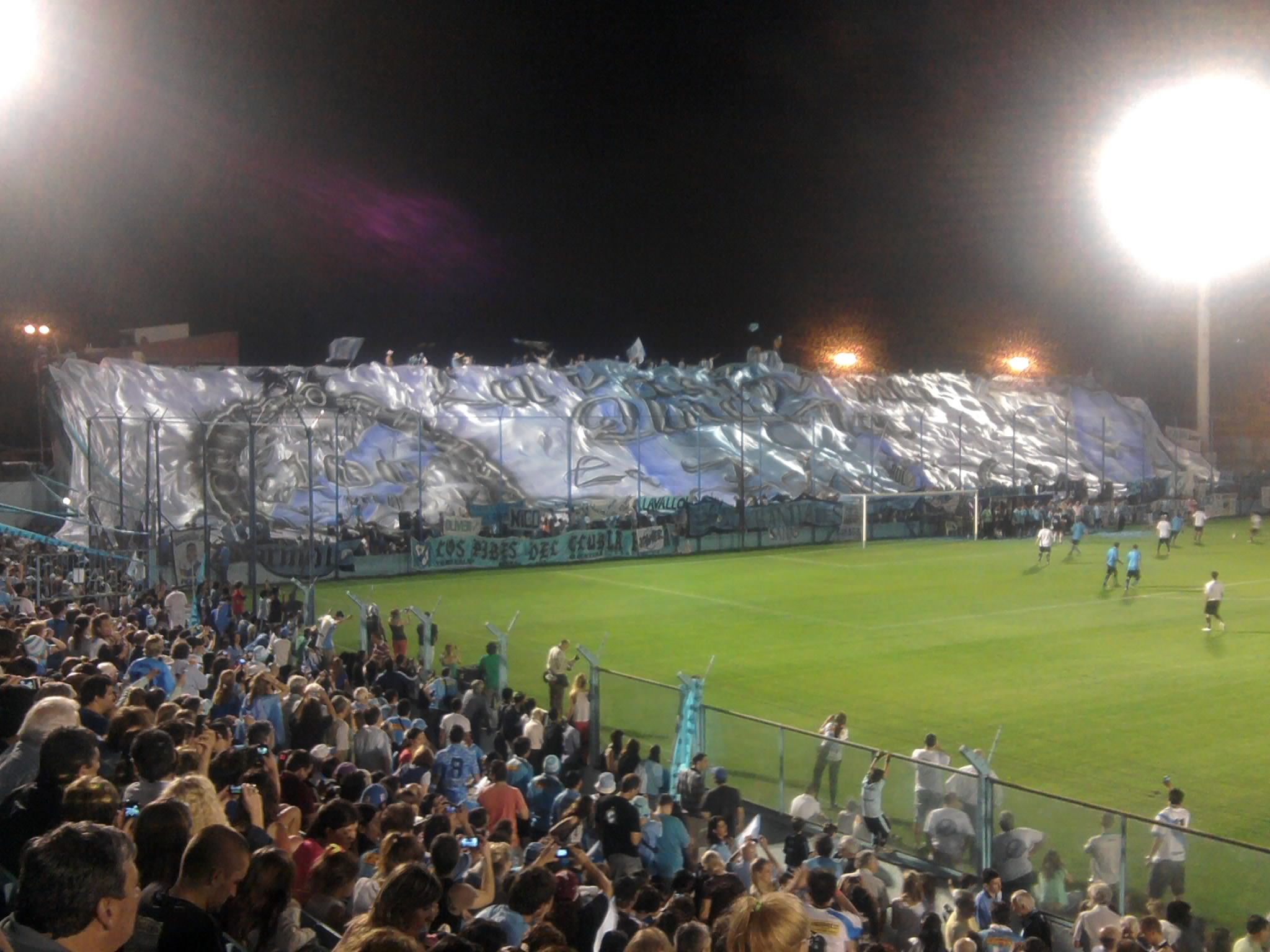
- The stadium in 2012
- Interactive map of Alfredo Beranger Stadium
- Full name: Estadio Alfredo Martín Beranger
- Address: Av. 9 de Julio 360; Turdera; Argentina
- Owner: C.A. Temperley
- Capacity: 26,000
- Type: Stadium
- Surface: Grass
- Field size: 102 x 68 m

Construction
- Opened: 13 April 1924; 102 years ago
- Renovated: 1930s, 1947, 2005, 2012

Tenant
- C.A. Temperley (1924–present)

Website
- temperley.org.ar/estadio

Estadio Alfredo Beranger is a football stadium located in Turdera, a city in Lomas de Zamora Partido, Argentina. It is owned by Club Atlético Temperley, which host their home games there.

The stadium, inaugurated on 13 April 1924, holds 26,000 people. Its facilities include 24 press booths and a lighting system that consists of four 25m-height towers

== Overview ==
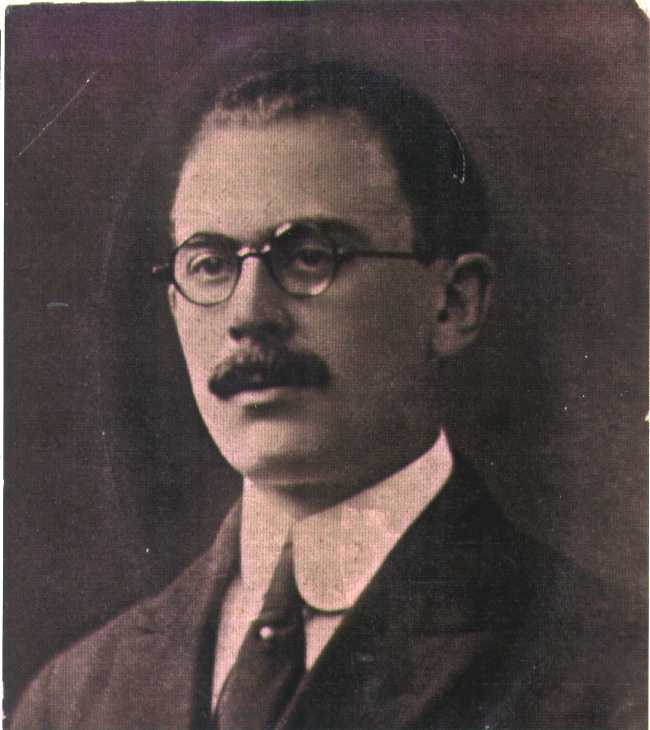
The stadium is named after former president of the club Alfredo Beranger (1891–1923)

The stadium was named after Alfredo Martín Beranger, president of C.A. Temperley since 1919 until his assassination in March 923. Beranger is also regarded as the most prominent president in the history of the club.

Temperley had started playing on a field in Turdera, then moving to "Campo Huergo" (near current Hospital Español), where they remained until 1924 when the team played their first match in the current location. That land was obtained through the management of Alfredo Beranger, who at the end of 1922 began to negotiate with the Buenos Aires Great Southern Railway (Ferrocarril del Sud) for its sale. It was he who provided his financial and verbal guarantee. Once the club took over the land, it was necessary to evict some families who had settled there. A member of one of those families, feeling humiliated after the eviction, murdered Beranger.

The stadium was officially inaugurated on April 13, 1924, in a match where Temperley (then named "Centenario Football Club") played vs Dock Sud, winning 2–1. The club built the first grandstand on Av. 9 de Julio in the 1930s. In 1947 that stand was replaced by a concrete grandstand while ten years after a new grandstand (on the opposite direction) and the stalls were built.

In 2005 the stadium inaugurated its lighting system in a friendly match vs the River Plate reserve team. Temperley won 2–1, with goals of Pablo Caballero and Lucas Hure.

The club renovated the stadium stalls in 2012 (commemorating their 100th. anniversary) replacing the old wooden stalls for new ones made in plastic.
