= Martín Rose =

Argentine footballer

Personal information
- Full name: Martín Ezequiel Rose
- Date of birth: 31 May 1993 (age 33)
- Place of birth: Lomas de Zamora, Argentina
- Height: 1.70 m (5 ft 7 in)
- Position: Midfielder

Youth career
- Boca Juniors
- 2007–2011: Los Andes

Senior career*
Years	Team	Apps	(Gls)
2011–2016	Los Andes	41	(1)
2015	→ Flandria (loan)	27	(3)
2016	→ Defensores de Belgrano (loan)	10	(0)
2016–2018	Comunicaciones	40	(7)
2018	Hapoel Bnei Lod	3	(1)
2019	Los Andes	1	(0)
2020	Pro Favara		
2020–2021	Casalbordino		
2021	Mazara		
2022	Ravecchia		
- * Club domestic league appearances and goals

Martín Ezequiel Rose (born 31 May 1993) is an Argentine professional footballer who plays as a midfielder.

== Career ==
Rose began his career with Los Andes from 2007, joining from Boca Juniors. After thirty-eight appearances in his first three campaigns, Rose netted his first senior goal in the club's 2013–14 Primera B Metropolitana final day encounter against UAI Urquiza. In January 2015, Rose completed a loan move to Flandria. Three goals in twenty-seven fixtures followed as they placed eleventh. He spent the subsequent 2016 season on loan with Defensores de Belgrano. On 1 September 2016, Rose left Los Andes permanently to sign for Comunicaciones. He played forty-one games and scored eight.

In 2018, Rose joined Liga Leumit side Hapoel Bnei Lod. He made just three appearances for the Israeli club, appearing in fixtures with Hapoel Petah Tikva, Hapoel Acre and, lastly, Maccabi Ahi Nazareth, who he scored against in a 1–2 defeat on 5 October. Rose returned to Argentina with former team Los Andes, now of Primera B Nacional, in January 2019. He appeared just once for them, in a defeat to Agropecuario on 16 February, before terminating his contract at the end of the season in June. In January 2020, Rose completed a move to Italian football with Eccellenza Sicily outfit Pro Favara.

In the succeeding October, Rose headed to Casalbordino of Eccellenza Abruzzo.

On 3 March 2021, he was signed by Eccellenza Sicily club Mazara. He then briefly played for Swiss amateurs AC Ravecchia in early 2022.

== Career statistics ==
As of 11 October 2020.

Appearances and goals by club, season and competition
Club	Season	League			Cup		Continental		Other		Total	
Club	Season	Division	Apps	Goals	Apps	Goals	Apps	Goals	Apps	Goals	Apps	Goals
Los Andes	2011–12	Primera B Metropolitana	15	0	0	0	—		0	0	15	0
Los Andes	2012–13	Primera B Metropolitana	5	0	0	0	—		0	0	5	0
Los Andes	2013–14	Primera B Metropolitana	19	1	1	0	—		0	0	20	1
Los Andes	2014	Primera B Metropolitana	2	0	0	0	—		0	0	2	0
Los Andes	2015	Primera B Nacional	0	0	0	0	—		0	0	0	0
Los Andes	2016	Primera B Nacional	0	0	0	0	—		0	0	0	0
Los Andes	Total		41	1	1	0	—		0	0	42	1
Flandria (loan)	2015	Primera B Metropolitana	27	3	1	0	—		0	0	28	3
Defensores de Belgrano (loan)	2016	Primera B Metropolitana	10	0	0	0	—		0	0	10	0
Comunicaciones	2016–17	Primera B Metropolitana	16	2	0	0	—		1 (Note: Appearance(s) in the Primera B Metropolitana play-offs)	1	17	3
Comunicaciones	2017–18	Primera B Metropolitana	24	5	0	0	—		0	0	24	5
Comunicaciones	Total		40	7	0	0	—		1	1	41	8
Hapoel Bnei Lod	2018–19	Liga Leumit	3	1	0	0	—		0	0	3	1
Los Andes	2018–19	Primera B Nacional	1	0	0	0	—		0	0	1	0
Career total			122	12	2	0	—		1	1	125	13
