= Santiago Tossi =

Argentine professional footballer

Personal information
- Full name: Santiago Franco Tossi
- Date of birth: 4 September 1994 (age 32)
- Place of birth: Argentina
- Height: 1.62 m (5 ft 4 in)
- Position: Midfielder

Team information
- Current team: Comunicaciones

Senior career*
Years	Team	Apps	(Gls)
2013–2018	Colegiales	119	(7)
2018–	Comunicaciones	34	(3)
- * Club domestic league appearances and goals as of 23:54, 12 May 2019 (UTC)

Santiago Franco Tossi (born 4 September 1994) is an Argentine professional footballer who plays as a midfielder for Comunicaciones.

== Career ==
Tossi began his career with Colegiales. After twenty-three appearances in three seasons, which included his senior bow versus San Telmo in April 2013, Tossi netted his first goal during a 2–0 win over Brown on 25 October 2014; another goal followed six days later versus Deportivo Merlo, as he scored twice in five games in 2014. Ninety-three matches and five goals occurred in four further seasons with Colegiales. In July 2018, Tossi joined fellow third tier club Comunicaciones. His first goals arrived in the succeeding December versus Sacachispas and Tristán Suárez.

== Career statistics ==
As of 12 May 2019.

Appearances and goals by club, season and competition
Club	Season	League			Cup		League Cup		Continental		Other		Total	
Club	Season	Division	Apps	Goals	Apps	Goals	Apps	Goals	Apps	Goals	Apps	Goals	Apps	Goals
Colegiales	2012–13	Primera B Metropolitana	6	0	0	0	—		—		0	0	6	0
Colegiales	2013–14	Primera B Metropolitana	15	0	1	0	—		—		0	0	16	0
Colegiales	2014	Primera B Metropolitana	5	2	1	0	—		—		0	0	6	2
Colegiales	2015	Primera B Metropolitana	34	3	0	0	—		—		0	0	34	3
Colegiales	2016	Primera B Metropolitana	16	1	0	0	—		—		0	0	16	1
Colegiales	2016–17	Primera B Metropolitana	26	1	0	0	—		—		0	0	26	1
Colegiales	2017–18	Primera B Metropolitana	17	0	0	0	—		—		0	0	17	0
Colegiales	Total		119	7	2	0	—		—		0	0	121	7
Comunicaciones	2018–19	Primera B Metropolitana	34	3	0	0	—		—		0	0	34	3
Career total			153	10	2	0	—		—		0	0	155	10
