= Mauro Miraglia =

Argentine professional footballer

Personal information
- Date of birth: 4 October 1997 (age 29)
- Place of birth: Buenos Aires, Argentina
- Position: Midfielder

Team information
- Current team: Comunicaciones

Senior career*
Years	Team	Apps	(Gls)
2017–	Comunicaciones	47	(3)
- * Club domestic league appearances and goals as of 11:32, 12 May 2019 (UTC)

Mauro Miraglia (born 4 October 1997) is an Argentine professional footballer who plays as a midfielder for Comunicaciones.

== Career ==
Miraglia's career began in the ranks of Comunicaciones. He began featuring for the club in the second part of 2016–17, making his debut in a 2–1 win over Acassuso on 11 March 2017; he was substituted on in place of Federico Barrionuevo. Further appearances versus Colegiales, San Telmo and Atlanta arrived that season in Primera B Metropolitana. In 2017–18, Miraglia scored goals against Acassuso and San Telmo; as well as against Platense.

== Career statistics ==
As of 12 May 2019.

Appearances and goals by club, season and competition
Club	Season	League			Cup		League Cup		Continental		Other		Total	
Club	Season	Division	Apps	Goals	Apps	Goals	Apps	Goals	Apps	Goals	Apps	Goals	Apps	Goals
Comunicaciones	2016–17	Primera B Metropolitana	4	0	0	0	—		—		0	0	4	0
Comunicaciones	2017–18	Primera B Metropolitana	15	3	0	0	—		—		0	0	15	3
Comunicaciones	2018–19	Primera B Metropolitana	28	0	0	0	—		—		0	0	28	0
Career total			47	3	0	0	—		—		0	0	47	3
