= Jonatan Soria =

Argentine professional footballer

Personal information
- Full name: Jonatan Luis Soria
- Date of birth: 25 August 1989 (age 37)
- Place of birth: Villa Domínico, Argentina
- Height: 1.81 m (5 ft 11 in)
- Position: Midfielder

Senior career*
Years	Team	Apps	(Gls)
2008–2015	Estudiantes BA	170	(6)
2015	→ Sportivo Italiano (loan)	4	(0)
2016–2019	Comunicaciones	94	(8)
2019–2020	Talleres Remedios	5	(0)
2020–2021	Sportivo Italiano	9	(0)
- * Club domestic league appearances and goals as of 11:49, 23 May 2020 (UTC)

Jonatan Luis Soria (born 25 August 1989) is an Argentine professional footballer who plays as a midfielder.

== Career ==
Soria got his career in senior football started with Estudiantes in 2008. He remained for a total of seven years with the club, making one hundred and seventy appearances whilst scoring six goals; three of which came in the 2011–12 Primera B Metropolitana campaign. Soria spent time out on loan with Sportivo Italiano in 2015, appearing just four times in a season which the club ended with relegation. Soria returned to Estudiantes, though subsequently departed in January 2016 to join Comunicaciones; a fellow third tier team. His debut came on 6 February against Atlanta. He scored five goals in his first three seasons.

== Career statistics ==
As of 12 May 2019.

Appearances and goals by club, season and competition
Club	Season	League			Cup		League Cup		Continental		Other		Total	
Club	Season	Division	Apps	Goals	Apps	Goals	Apps	Goals	Apps	Goals	Apps	Goals	Apps	Goals
Estudiantes	2012–13	Primera B Metropolitana	35	0	4	0	—		—		0	0	39	0
Estudiantes	2013–14	Primera B Metropolitana	35	1	6	1	—		—		0	0	41	2
Estudiantes	2014	Primera B Metropolitana	8	0	3	0	—		—		0	0	11	0
Estudiantes	2015	Primera B Metropolitana	0	0	0	0	—		—		0	0	0	0
Estudiantes	Total		78	1	13	1	—		—		0	0	91	2
Sportivo Italiano (loan)	2015	Primera B Metropolitana	4	0	0	0	—		—		0	0	4	0
Comunicaciones	2016	Primera B Metropolitana	15	0	0	0	—		—		0	0	15	0
Comunicaciones	2016–17	Primera B Metropolitana	28	4	0	0	—		—		5 (Note: Appearance(s) in the Primera B Metropolitana play-offs)	0	33	4
Comunicaciones	2017–18	Primera B Metropolitana	13	1	0	0	—		—		0	0	13	1
Comunicaciones	2018–19	Primera B Metropolitana	33	3	0	0	—		—		0	0	33	3
Comunicaciones	Total		89	8	0	0	—		—		5	0	94	8
Career total			171	9	13	1	—		—		5	0	189	10
