= Maximiliano Sosa =

Argentine footballer (born 1988)

Personal information
- Date of birth: 24 March 1988 (age 38)
- Place of birth: Resistencia, Argentina
- Height: 1.80 m (5 ft 11 in)
- Position: Midfielder

Team information
- Current team: Deportivo Español

Senior career*
Years	Team	Apps	(Gls)
2006–2009	Defensores de Belgrano	21	(0)
2010–2011	Plaza Colonia	7	(0)
2011–2012	Sarmiento	16	(0)
2012–2013	Colegiales	8	(0)
2013–2017	Deportivo Español	106	(3)
2017–2018	UAI Urquiza	8	(0)
2018–	Deportivo Español	32	(0)
- * Club domestic league appearances and goals as of 18:55, 28 October 2020 (UTC)

Maximiliano Sosa (born 24 March 1988) is an Argentine professional footballer who plays as a midfielder for Deportivo Español.

== Career ==
Sosa began his career in Buenos Aires with Defensores de Belgrano, appearing twenty-one times across three years from 2006 in Primera B Metropolitana. Between 2010 and 2011, Sosa featured seven times for Uruguayan Segunda División side Plaza Colonia. Sosa returned to his homeland in 2011, signing for Sarmiento of Torneo Argentino B. After eighteen appearances for his hometown team, the midfielder spent the 2012–13 campaign in the third tier with Colegiales. Primera C Metropolitana's Deportivo Español signed Sosa in July 2013. Four goals in thirty-eight followed, as 2013–14 ended with promotion.

After appearing one hundred and thirteen times and netting four goals in five seasons with Deportivo Español, Sosa departed in July 2017 to UAI Urquiza. Eight appearances followed, prior to Sosa completing a return to Deportivo Español on 30 June 2018. His second debut for them arrived in August during a one-goal home defeat to Talleres, on the way to fifteen further matches as they suffered relegation.

== Career statistics ==
As of 28 October 2020.

Appearances and goals by club, season and competition
Club	Season	League			Cup		League Cup		Continental		Other		Total	
Club	Season	Division	Apps	Goals	Apps	Goals	Apps	Goals	Apps	Goals	Apps	Goals	Apps	Goals
Plaza Colonia	2010–11	Segunda División	7	0	0	0	—		—		0	0	7	0
Sarmiento	2011–12	Torneo Argentino B	16	0	2	0	—		—		0	0	18	0
Colegiales	2012–13	Primera B Metropolitana	8	0	0	0	—		—		0	0	8	0
Deportivo Español	2013–14	Primera C Metropolitana	36	3	2	1	—		—		0	0	38	4
Deportivo Español	2014	Primera B Metropolitana	11	0	0	0	—		—		0	0	11	0
Deportivo Español	2015	Primera B Metropolitana	24	0	4	0	—		—		0	0	28	0
Deportivo Español	2016	Primera B Metropolitana	18	0	0	0	—		—		0	0	18	0
Deportivo Español	2016–17	Primera B Metropolitana	17	0	0	0	—		—		1 (Note: Appearance(s) in the Primera B Metropolitana play-offs)	0	18	0
Deportivo Español	Total		106	3	6	1	—		—		1	0	113	4
UAI Urquiza	2017–18	Primera B Metropolitana	8	0	0	0	—		—		0	0	8	0
Deportivo Español	2018–19	Primera B Metropolitana	16	0	0	0	—		—		0	0	16	0
Deportivo Español	2019–20	Primera C Metropolitana	16	0	0	0	—		—		0	0	16	0
Deportivo Español	Total		32	0	0	0	—		—		0	0	32	0
Career total			177	3	6	1	—		—		1	0	184	4
