= César Atamañuk =

Argentine professional footballer

Personal information
- Full name: César Gabriel Atamañuk
- Date of birth: 9 April 1996 (age 30)
- Place of birth: Moreno, Argentina
- Position: Goalkeeper

Team information
- Current team: Acassuso

Youth career
- Tigre
- 2014–2017: Vélez Sarsfield

Senior career*
Years	Team	Apps	(Gls)
2017	Luján	0	(0)
2017	El Linqueño	11	(0)
2018–2021	Colegiales	8	(0)
2021–2023	Sacachispas	39	(0)
2023–2024	San Telmo	18	(0)
2024–2025	Aldosivi	4	(0)
2025–2026	Argentino Merlo	36	(0)
2026–	Acassuso	0	(0)
- * Club domestic league appearances and goals as of 16:31, 21 April 2026 (UTC)

César Gabriel Atamañuk (born 9 April 1996) is an Argentine professional footballer who plays as a goalkeeper for Acassuso.

== Career ==
Atamañuk played in the youth set-up of Vélez Sarsfield, having signed from Tigre in 2014. In 2017, after a short stint with Luján, Atamañuk joined Club Atlético El Linqueño of Torneo Federal B. Eleven appearances followed, which preceded his departure on 4 November 2017. On 9 July 2018, Atamañuk was signed by Colegiales of Primera B Metropolitana. He made his debut in a 3–1 defeat away to San Telmo on 25 February 2019, as he replaced Daniel Monllor after fifty-eight minutes. His first start arrived against All Boys in the succeeding March, a month which saw him appear three more times for the club.

== Career statistics ==
As of 5 May 2019.

Appearances and goals by club, season and competition
Club	Season	League			Cup		League Cup		Continental		Other		Total	
Club	Season	Division	Apps	Goals	Apps	Goals	Apps	Goals	Apps	Goals	Apps	Goals	Apps	Goals
Luján	2016–17	Primera C Metropolitana	0	0	0	0	—		—		0	0	0	0
El Linqueño	2017	Torneo Federal B	11	0	0	0	—		—		0	0	11	0
Colegiales	2018–19	Primera B Metropolitana	5	0	0	0	—		—		0	0	5	0
Career total			16	0	0	0	—		—		0	0	16	0
