= Gonzalo Herrera =

Argentine professional footballer

Personal information
- Full name: Gonzalo Javier Herrera
- Date of birth: 14 March 1997 (age 29)
- Place of birth: Argentina
- Height: 1.73 m (5 ft 8 in)
- Position: Defender

Youth career
- Huracán
- 2017–2018: Atlanta

Senior career*
| Years | Team | Apps | (Gls) |
| 2018–2021 | Atlanta | 2 | (0) |
- * Club domestic league appearances and goals as of 09:48, 27 April 2019 (UTC)

Gonzalo Javier Herrera (born 14 March 1997) is an Argentine professional footballer who plays as a defender.

== Career ==
Herrera, having joined from Huracán in 2017, made the breakthrough into Atlanta's senior set-up during the 2017–18 season in Primera B Metropolitana, with manager Francisco Berscé selecting him to start in fixtures against Comunicaciones and San Telmo in April 2018. He subsequently returned to the club's reserves, before reappearing for a Copa Argentina loss to Arsenal de Sarandí in April 2019.

== Career statistics ==
As of 27 April 2019.

Appearances and goals by club, season and competition
| Club | Season | League | | | Cup | | League Cup | | Continental | | Other | | Total | |
| Club | Season | Division | Apps | Goals | Apps | Goals | Apps | Goals | Apps | Goals | Apps | Goals | Apps | Goals |
|---|---|---|---|---|---|---|---|---|---|---|---|---|---|---|
| Atlanta | 2017–18 | Primera B Metropolitana | 2 | 0 | 0 | 0 | — | | — | | 0 | 0 | 2 | 0 |
| Atlanta | 2018–19 | Primera B Metropolitana | 0 | 0 | 1 | 0 | — | | — | | 0 | 0 | 1 | 0 |
| Career total | | | 2 | 0 | 1 | 0 | — | | — | | 0 | 0 | 3 | 0 |
