= Julián Rodríguez (footballer, born 1997) =

Argentine professional footballer

Personal information
- Full name: Julián Ignacio Rodríguez Seguer
- Date of birth: 11 April 1997 (age 29)
- Place of birth: Argentina
- Position: Forward

Team information
- Current team: Deportivo Laferrere

Senior career*
Years	Team	Apps	(Gls)
2017–2019	Comunicaciones	53	(4)
2019–2020	Colegiales	11	(1)
2021	Deportivo Riestra	1	(0)
2022–2023	Deportivo Laferrere	8	(0)
2023-	Club Social y Deportivo Liniers		
- * Club domestic league appearances and goals

Julián Ignacio Rodríguez Seguer (born 11 April 1997) is an Argentine professional footballer who plays as a forward for Deportivo Laferrere.

== Career ==
Rodríguez's career began with Comunicaciones. He started featuring for their first-team in the 2016–17 Primera B Metropolitana, making his professional debut on 6 May 2017 versus Fénix; replacing Darío Ramella after seventy-seven minutes. His first appearance as a starter arrived a week later against San Telmo, a fixture he left twenty-seven minutes early after receiving a red card. Rodríguez ended the 2016–17 season by appearing in the promotion play-offs, where he scored goals against Barracas Central and Estudiantes; though they'd be eliminated by Deportivo Riestra. Four goals in twenty-four games occurred in 2017–18.

Rodríguez spent the 2019–20 season with Colegiales, making eleven appearances and scoring once before departing in June 2020. After a short spell at Deportivo Riestra in 2021, Rodríguez moved to Deportivo Laferrere ahead of the 2022 season.

== Career statistics ==
As of 24 September 2020.

Appearances and goals by club, season and competition
Club	Season	League			Cup		League Cup		Continental		Other		Total	
Club	Season	Division	Apps	Goals	Apps	Goals	Apps	Goals	Apps	Goals	Apps	Goals	Apps	Goals
Comunicaciones	2016–17	Primera B Metropolitana	4	0	0	0	—		—		5 (Note: Appearance(s) in the Primera B Metropolitana play-offs)	2	9	2
Comunicaciones	2017–18	Primera B Metropolitana	24	4	0	0	—		—		0	0	24	4
Comunicaciones	2018–19	Primera B Metropolitana	25	0	0	0	—		—		0	0	25	0
Comunicaciones	Total		53	4	0	0	—		—		5	2	58	6
Colegiales	2019–20	Primera B Metropolitana	11	1	0	0	—		—		0	0	11	1
Career total			64	5	0	0	—		—		5	2	69	7
