= Hernán Ruquet =

Argentine professional footballer

Personal information
- Date of birth: 1 January 1990 (age 36)
- Place of birth: Buenos Aires, Argentina
- Height: 1.82 m (6 ft 0 in)
- Position: Defender

Team information
- Current team: Comunicaciones

Senior career*
Years	Team	Apps	(Gls)
2009–2016	Almagro	89	(6)
2016–2017	Comunicaciones	29	(2)
2017–2018	Almirante Brown	24	(1)
2018–	Comunicaciones	26	(2)
- * Club domestic league appearances and goals as of 12:37, 11 May 2019 (UTC)

Hernán Ruquet (born 1 January 1990) is an Argentine ex professional footballer who played as a defender for Comunicaciones.

== Career ==
Ruquet's career started in Primera B Metropolitana with Almagro. Six goals in a total of ninety appearances arrived across seven campaigns from 2009–10, with the defender appearing thirty-two times in 2015 as they won promotion to Primera B Nacional. Having appeared four times in the second tier, Ruquet went back to Primera B Metropolitana with Comunicaciones on 20 July 2016. He made his debut versus Acassuso on 21 August, before scoring his first goals in October against UAI Urquiza and Fénix respectively. Ruquet departed to spend 2017–18 with Almirante Brown, prior to rejoining Comunicaciones ahead of the 2018–19 season.

== Career statistics ==
As of 11 May 2019.

Appearances and goals by club, season and competition
Club	Season	League			Cup		League Cup		Continental		Other		Total	
Club	Season	Division	Apps	Goals	Apps	Goals	Apps	Goals	Apps	Goals	Apps	Goals	Apps	Goals
Almagro	2012–13	Primera B Metropolitana	18	0	1	0	—		—		0	0	19	0
Almagro	2013–14	Primera B Metropolitana	8	0	0	0	—		—		0	0	8	0
Almagro	2014	Primera B Metropolitana	12	1	0	0	—		—		0	0	12	1
Almagro	2015	Primera B Metropolitana	28	0	0	0	—		—		4 (Note: Appearance(s) in the Primera B Metropolitana play-offs)	0	32	0
Almagro	2016	Primera B Nacional	4	0	0	0	—		—		0	0	4	0
Almagro	Total		70	1	1	0	—		—		4	0	75	1
Comunicaciones	2016–17	Primera B Metropolitana	29	2	0	0	—		—		2	0	31	2
Almirante Brown	2017–18	Primera B Metropolitana	24	1	0	0	—		—		0	0	24	1
Comunicaciones	2018–19	Primera B Metropolitana	26	2	0	0	—		—		0	0	26	2
Career total			149	6	1	0	—		—		6	0	156	6
