= 2011–12 Primera B Metropolitana =

Primera B Metropolitana
- Season: 2011–12
- Champions: Sarmiento (J)
- Promoted: Sarmiento (J); Nueva Chicago
- Relegated: Sportivo Italiano; General Lamadrid
- Matches played: 430
- Goals scored: 912 (2.12 per match)
- Top goalscorer: (Argentina) Ángel Vildozo (21)

The 2011-12 Argentine Primera B Metropolitana was the 113th. season of Primera B Metropolitana, the third division of the Argentine football league system. The season began on 5 August 2011 and ended on 25 May 2012. A total of 21 clubs participated in the competition.

Sarmiento de Junín won their 3rd. Primera B Metro title promoting to Primera Nacional. Nueva Chicago was the 2nd. team promoted to the upper division after defeating Chacarita Juniors in the promotion playoff.

On the other hand, Sportivo Italiano and General Lamadrid were relegated to Primera C.

== Club information ==
| Club | City | Province | Stadium |
|---|---|---|---|
| Acassuso | Boulogne | Buenos Aires | La Quema |
| Almagro | José Ingenieros | Buenos Aires | Tres de Febrero |
| Barracas Central | Buenos Aires | autonomous city | Barracas Central |
| Brown | Adrogué | Buenos Aires | Lorenzo Arandilla |
| Colegiales | Florida Oeste | Buenos Aires | Libertarios Unidos |
| Comunicaciones | Buenos Aires | autonomous city | Alfredo Ramos |
| Defensores de Belgrano | Buenos Aires | autonomous city | Juan Pasquale |
| Deportivo Morón | Morón | Buenos Aires | Nuevo Francisco Urbano |
| Estudiantes (BA) | Caseros | Buenos Aires | Ciudad de Caseros |
| Flandria | Jáuregui | Buenos Aires | Carlos V |
| General Lamadrid | Buenos Aires | autonomous city | |
| Los Andes | Lomas de Zamora | Buenos Aires | Eduardo Gallardón |
| Nueva Chicago | Buenos Aires | autonomous city | Nueva Chicago |
| Platense | Florida | Buenos Aires | Ciudad de Vicente López |
| San Telmo | Dock Sud | Buenos Aires | Dr. Osvaldo Baletto |
| Sarmiento | Junín | Buenos Aires | Eva Perón |
| Deportivo Español | Buenos Aires | (autonomous city) | Nueva España |
| Sportivo Italiano | Ciudad Evita | Buenos Aires | Sportivo Italiano |
| Temperley | Temperley | Buenos Aires | Alfredo Beranger |
| Tristán Suárez | Tristán Suárez | Buenos Aires | 20 de Octubre |
| Villa San Carlos | Berisso | Buenos Aires | Gennasio Salice |

== Table ==
=== Standings ===
| Pos | Team | Pld | W | D | L | GF | GA | GD | Pts | Promotion or qualification |
|---|---|---|---|---|---|---|---|---|---|---|
| 1 | Sarmiento (J) | 40 | 24 | 8 | 8 | 52 | 24 | +28 | 80 | Primera B Nacional |
| 2 | Colegiales | 40 | 21 | 10 | 9 | 54 | 33 | +21 | 73 | Torneo Reducido |
| 3 | Estudiantes (BA) | 40 | 20 | 12 | 8 | 49 | 29 | +20 | 72 | Torneo Reducido |
| 4 | Nueva Chicago | 40 | 20 | 10 | 10 | 56 | 36 | +20 | 70 | Torneo Reducido |
| 5 | Brown | 40 | 19 | 12 | 9 | 64 | 34 | +30 | 69 | Torneo Reducido |
| 6 | Platense | 40 | 16 | 13 | 11 | 44 | 32 | +12 | 61 | Torneo Reducido |
| 7 | Los Andes | 40 | 16 | 13 | 11 | 44 | 38 | +6 | 61 | Torneo Reducido |
| 8 | Comunicaciones | 40 | 18 | 6 | 16 | 42 | 38 | +4 | 60 | Torneo Reducido |
| 9 | Acassuso | 40 | 15 | 10 | 15 | 43 | 47 | −4 | 55 | Torneo Reducido |
| 10 | Almagro | 40 | 13 | 15 | 12 | 43 | 39 | +4 | 54 | |
| 11 | Villa San Carlos | 40 | 14 | 12 | 14 | 32 | 41 | −9 | 54 | |
| 12 | Deportivo Armenio | 40 | 12 | 14 | 14 | 45 | 49 | −4 | 50 | |
| 13 | Flandria | 40 | 12 | 14 | 14 | 36 | 43 | −7 | 50 | |
| 14 | San Telmo | 40 | 11 | 14 | 15 | 29 | 37 | −8 | 47 | |
| 15 | Temperley | 40 | 11 | 13 | 16 | 40 | 45 | −5 | 46 | |
| 16 | Sportivo Italiano | 40 | 10 | 16 | 14 | 32 | 42 | −10 | 46 | |
| 17 | Tristán Suárez | 40 | 12 | 9 | 19 | 48 | 57 | −9 | 45 | |
| 18 | Defensores de Belgrano | 40 | 10 | 11 | 19 | 31 | 43 | −12 | 41 | |
| 19 | Barracas Central | 40 | 10 | 10 | 20 | 36 | 51 | −15 | 40 | |
| 20 | Deportivo Morón | 40 | 9 | 8 | 23 | 39 | 60 | −21 | 35 | |
| 21 | General Lamadrid | 40 | 7 | 10 | 23 | 28 | 68 | −40 | 31 | |

Updated to match(es) played on 26 May 2012. Source: AFA
Rules for classification: 1st points; 2nd goal difference; 3rd goals scored; 4th head-to-head points; 5th head-to-head goal difference; 6th head-to-head goals scored. This does not apply to determining the champion. If two or more teams had been tied in point at the end of the tournament, a playoff would have been held at a neutral venue within 72 hours for the championship

== Torneo Reducido ==
The quarterfinals will be played as single elimination, at the stadium of the higher-placed team. Seeding for the semifinals and final is determined by the team standings in the regular season.

Quarterfinals
2 | Colegiales | 2 | – | 2
9 | Acassuso | 3 | – | 3
3 | Estudiantes (BA) | 1 | – | 1
8 | Comunicaciones | 0 | – | 0
4 | Nueva Chicago | 3 | – | 3
7 | Los Andes | 0 | – | 0
5 | Brown | 1 | – | 1
6 | Platense | 3 | – | 3

Semifinals
9 | Acassuso | 1 | 2 | 3
3 | Estudiantes (BA) | 0 | 1 | 1
4 | Nueva Chicago | 0 | 3 | 3
6 | Platense | 0 | 0 | 0

Final
9 | Acassuso | 2 | 0 | 2
4 | Nueva Chicago | 2 | 1 | 3

=== Promotion playoff matches ===
Winner of torneo reducido (Nueva Chicago) played in a two-legged tie vs the 2011–12 Primera B Nacional penultimate team (Chacarita Juniors).

Promotion playoff
(B Metro vs B Nacional)
27 June 2012
First leg

| Nueva Chicago | 1–0 | Chacarita Juniors |
|---|---|---|
| Carboni 46' | Report |

Estadio República de Mataderos, Buenos Aires
Referee: Diego Ceballos

30 June 2012
Second leg

| Chacarita Juniors | 1–1 | Nueva Chicago |
|---|---|---|
| Tellas 88' | ESPN; Infobae | Carboni 84' |

Estadio Chacarita Juniors, Villa Maipú
Referee: Mauro Vigliano

Team details

Chacarita Juniors
Nueva Chicago

| GK | (Argentina) Nicolás Tauber |
| DF | (Argentina) Maximiliano Paredes |
| DF | (Argentina) Matías Zaldivia | | (red card) 41' |
| DF | (Argentina) Sebastián Pena | Booked |
| DF | (Argentina) Emanuel Morales |
| MF | (Argentina) Mauro Pajón | Booked |
| MF | (Argentina) Franco Dolci | Booked | (substituted off) 29' |
| MF | (Argentina) Damián Toledo | Booked |
| MF | (Argentina) Emanuel Centurión |
| FW | (Argentina) Sebastián Ereros | | (substituted off) 26' |
| FW | (Argentina) Juan Manuel Cobelli | Booked |
Substitutions:
| FW | (Argentina) Gabriel Tellas | | (substituted in) 26' |
| MF | (Argentina) Mauro Bellone | | (substituted in) 29' |
Manager:
(Argentina) Salvador Pasini

| GK | (Argentina) Daniel Monllor |
| DF | (Argentina) Leandro Testa | Booked |
| DF | (Paraguay) Samuel Cáceres |
| DF | (Argentina) Matías Escudero | Booked | (substituted off) 45' |
| DF | (Argentina) Lucas Banegas |
| MF | (Argentina) Adrián Scifo | | (substituted off) 42' |
| MF | (Argentina) Julio Serrano |
| MF | (Argentina) Damián Lemos |
| MF | (Colombia) José Ramírez | Booked | (substituted off) 27' |
| FW | (Argentina) Christian Gómez | Booked |
| FW | (Argentina) Leonardo Carboni |
Substitutions:
| DF | (Argentina) Ariel Coronel | | (substituted in) 45' |
| MF | (Argentina) Damián Castagno | | (substituted in) 27' |
| DF | (Argentina) Emiliano Lago | | (substituted in) 42' |
Manager:
(Argentina) Marcelo Franceschini

Nueva Chicago won 2–1 on aggregate, promoting to Primera B Nacional and relegating Chacarita to B Metro.

== Relegation ==
| Pos | Team | 2009–10 Pts | 2010–11 Pts | 2011–12 Pts | Total Pts | Total Pld | Avg | Relegation |
|---|---|---|---|---|---|---|---|---|
| 1 | Estudiantes (BA) | 61 | 73 | 72 | 206 | 122 | 1.689 | |
| 2 | Brown | 54 | 70 | 69 | 193 | 122 | 1.582 | |
| 3 | Sarmiento (J) | 75 | 37 | 80 | 192 | 122 | 1.574 | |
| 4 | Nueva Chicago | 51 | 71 | 70 | 192 | 122 | 1.574 | |
| 5 | Colegiales | 61 | 53 | 73 | 187 | 122 | 1.533 | |
| 6 | Platense | — | 53 | 61 | 114 | 82 | 1.39 | |
| 7 | Defensores de Belgrano | 55 | 71 | 41 | 167 | 122 | 1.369 | |
| 8 | Acassuso | 55 | 56 | 55 | 166 | 122 | 1.361 | |
| 9 | Villa San Carlos | 48 | 60 | 54 | 162 | 122 | 1.328 | |
| 10 | Almagro | 44 | 58 | 54 | 156 | 122 | 1.27 | |
| 11 | Los Andes | 60 | 34 | 61 | 155 | 122 | 1.27 | |
| 12 | Comunicaciones | 35 | 60 | 60 | 155 | 122 | 1.27 | |
| 13 | Barracas Central | — | 64 | 40 | 104 | 82 | 1.268 | |
| 14 | Deportivo Armenio | 38 | 65 | 50 | 153 | 122 | 1.254 | |
| 15 | Tristán Suárez | 62 | 46 | 45 | 153 | 122 | 1.254 | |
| 16 | Flandria | 47 | 54 | 50 | 151 | 122 | 1.238 | |
| 17 | Temperley | 56 | 44 | 46 | 146 | 122 | 1.197 | |
| 18 | San Telmo | 54 | 42 | 47 | 143 | 122 | 1.172 | |
| 19 | Deportivo Morón | 47 | 61 | 35 | 143 | 122 | 1.172 | |
| 20 | Sportivo Italiano | — | 47 | 46 | 93 | 82 | 1.134 | Relegation Playoff Matches |
| 21 | General Lamadrid | — | — | 31 | 31 | 40 | 0.775 | Primera C Metropolitana |

=== Relegation Playoff Matches ===
| Team 1 | Agg. | Team 2 | 1st leg | 2nd leg |
Relegation/promotion playoff
| Central Córdoba | 3–1 | Sportivo Italiano | 1–1 | 2–0 |

== See also ==
- 2011–12 in Argentine football
