= Giovagnoli =

Giovagnoli is a surname of Italian origin.

People with the surname include:

- Dalcio Giovagnoli (born 1963), Argentinian football coach and former player, currently managing Chilean club Curicó Unido
- Filippo Giovagnoli (born 1970), Italian football coach and former player
- Nicolás Giovagnoli (born 1998), Argentinian football player, currently for Comunicaciones
- Raffaello Giovagnoli (1838–1915), Italian writer and politician
