= Arricau =

Arricau may refer to:

== Place ==
- Arricau-Bordes

== People ==
- Juan Bautista Arricau
- Stéphanie Arricau
