= Fernando Maldonado =

Fernando Maldonado may refer to:

- Fernando Maldonado Hernández (born 1966), Mexican politician
- Fernando Maldonado (footballer) (born 1992), Argentine footballer
- Fernando Z. Maldonado (1917–1996), Mexican composer, known for Mexican cumbias
