= Akira Taira =

Argentine footballer

Personal information
- Full name: Akira Sebastián Taira
- Date of birth: 15 July 1994 (age 32)
- Place of birth: Buenos Aires, Argentina
- Position: Defender

Senior career*
Years	Team	Apps	(Gls)
2012–2014	Comunicaciones	2	(0)
2015–2016	Ituzaingó	19	(0)
2016	Central Ballester	1	(0)
- * Club domestic league appearances and goals

Akira Sebastián Taira (born 15 July 1994) is an Argentine footballer who plays as a defender. He is a free agent.

== Career ==
Taira was selected into Comunicaciones' first-team squad for the 2012–13 Primera B Metropolitana season, subsequently making his professional debut in November 2012 during a 0–0 draw with Tristán Suárez; he also featured a week later versus Deportivo Morón, a game which also ended goalless. On 30 June 2015, Ituzaingó completed the signing of Taira. Nineteen appearances followed across the 2015 and 2016 Primera C Metropolitana seasons. Taira joined Central Ballester in June 2016, but left months after following just one appearance for the club.

== Career statistics ==
As of 26 September 2018.

Club statistics
Club	Season	League			Cup (Note: Includes the Copa Argentina)		League Cup		Continental		Other		Total	
Club	Season	Division	Apps	Goals	Apps	Goals	Apps	Goals	Apps	Goals	Apps	Goals	Apps	Goals
Comunicaciones	2012–13	Primera B Metropolitana	2	0	0	0	—		—		0	0	2	0
Comunicaciones	2013–14	Primera B Metropolitana	0	0	0	0	—		—		0	0	0	0
Comunicaciones	Total		2	0	0	0	—		—		0	0	2	0
Central Ballester	2016–17	Primera C Metropolitana	1	0	0	0	—		—		0	0	1	0
Career total			3	0	0	0	—		—		0	0	3	0
