= Daniel Franco =

Daniel Franco may refer to:

- Daniel Franco (designer) (born 1971), American fashion designer
- Daniel Franco (Brazilian footballer) (born 1971), Brazilian football manager and former left-back
- Daniel Franco (Argentine footballer) (born 1991), Argentine football centre-back
- Danny Franco (born 1973), Israeli basketball coach

== See also ==
- Daniele Franco (born 1953), Italian economist and civil servant
- Daniel Frank (disambiguation)
