= Sebastián Corda =

Argentine professional footballer (born 1995)

Personal information
- Date of birth: 29 June 1995 (age 31)
- Place of birth: San Martín, Argentina
- Height: 1.70 m (5 ft 7 in)
- Position: Left-back

Team information
- Current team: Ferro Carril Oeste

Senior career*
Years	Team	Apps	(Gls)
2015–2020	Comunicaciones	99	(1)
2020–2021	Mitre	31	(1)
2022–2023	Instituto	66	(0)
2024–2025	Zrinjski Mostar	11	(0)
2025–2026	San Miguel	15	(1)
2026–	Ferro Carril Oeste	6	(0)
- * Club domestic league appearances and goals as of 17:16, 11 April 2026 (UTC)

Sebastián Corda (born 29 June 1995) is an Argentine professional footballer who plays as a left-back for Primera Nacional club Ferro Carril Oeste.

== Career ==
Corda started his career with Comunicaciones. His first appearance for the club arrived during the 2015 campaign in the Copa Argentina, as featured for the full duration of a penalty shoot-out win over Liniers on 2 April 2015; he appeared in Primera B Metropolitana for the first time five months later with an eight-minute cameo in a 0–4 victory against Acassuso on 8 September. Corda didn't appear in the subsequent 2016, though did make forty-eight appearances across the following two campaigns; netting his first goal in the process, as he scored in a fixture with Fénix on 18 March 2018.

== Career statistics ==
As of 10 May 2019.

Appearances and goals by club, season and competition
Club	Season	League			Cup		League Cup		Continental		Other		Total	
Club	Season	Division	Apps	Goals	Apps	Goals	Apps	Goals	Apps	Goals	Apps	Goals	Apps	Goals
Comunicaciones	2015	Primera B Metropolitana	1	0	1	0	—		—		0	0	2	0
Comunicaciones	2016	Primera B Metropolitana	0	0	0	0	—		—		0	0	0	0
Comunicaciones	2016–17	Primera B Metropolitana	12	0	0	0	—		—		5 (Note: Appearance(s) in the Primera B Metropolitana play-offs)	0	17	0
Comunicaciones	2017–18	Primera B Metropolitana	31	1	0	0	—		—		0	0	31	1
Comunicaciones	2018–19	Primera B Metropolitana	31	0	0	0	—		—		0	0	31	0
Career total			75	1	1	0	—		—		5	0	81	1

== Honours ==
Zrinjski Mostar

- Bosnian Cup: 2023–24
