= Nicolás Giovagnoli =

Argentine professional footballer

Personal information
- Date of birth: 15 May 1998 (age 28)
- Place of birth: Argentina
- Position: Forward

Team information
- Current team: Comunicaciones

Senior career*
Years	Team	Apps	(Gls)
2017–	Comunicaciones	27	(2)
- * Club domestic league appearances and goals as of 23:48, 11 May 2019 (UTC)

Nicolás Giovagnoli (born 15 May 1998) is an Argentine professional footballer who plays as a forward for Comunicaciones.

== Career ==
Giovagnoli started his career with Comunicaciones. His senior breakthrough arrived during the 2016–17 Primera B Metropolitana season as he made appearances off the bench against Atlanta and Estudiantes. Giovagnoli made his first start in 2017–18 against Sacachispas on 14 October 2017, scoring his first goal in the process at the Estadio Alfredo Ramos; the forward appeared fifteen times in total that season.

== Career statistics ==
As of 11 May 2019.

Appearances and goals by club, season and competition
Club	Season	League			Cup		League Cup		Continental		Other		Total	
Club	Season	Division	Apps	Goals	Apps	Goals	Apps	Goals	Apps	Goals	Apps	Goals	Apps	Goals
Comunicaciones	2016–17	Primera B Metropolitana	1	0	0	0	—		—		1 (Note: Appearance(s) in the Primera B Metropolitana play-offs)	0	2	0
Comunicaciones	2017–18	Primera B Metropolitana	15	1	0	0	—		—		0	0	15	1
Comunicaciones	2018–19	Primera B Metropolitana	11	1	0	0	—		—		0	0	11	1
Career total			27	2	0	0	—		—		1	0	28	2
