= Perugini =

Perugini is an Italian surname. Notable people with the surname include:

- Charles Edward Perugini (1839–1918), British painter
- Giovanni Perugini (born 1945), Italian athlete
- Marcelo Perugini (born 1984), Argentine footballer
- Stefano Perugini (born 1974), Italian motorcyclist
- Salvatore Perugini (born 1978), Italian rugby player
