= Maximiliano Zárate =

Argentine footballer

Personal information
- Full name: Maximiliano Zárate Fagiuolo
- Date of birth: 4 February 1993 (age 33)
- Place of birth: Córdoba, Argentina
- Height: 1.80 m (5 ft 11 in)
- Position: Forward

Team information
- Current team: Deportivo Llacuabamba
- Number: 28

Youth career
- 2007–2010: Belgrano

Senior career*
Years	Team	Apps	(Gls)
2010–2017	Belgrano	1	(0)
2010	→ Boca Río Gallegos (loan)	0	(0)
2012–2013	→ Deportivo Maipú (loan)	2	(0)
2014	→ Sportivo Belgrano (loan)	4	(0)
2016	→ Flandria (loan)	14	(2)
2016–2017	→ Comunicaciones (loan)	30	(7)
2017–2018	San Lorenzo	16	(3)
2018	Acción Juvenil		
2019–2021	Comunicaciones	38	(6)
2021	Deportivo Coopsol	22	(9)
2022	Alianza Universidad	21	(5)
2023	Universidad San Martín	14	(3)
2024–	Pirata	7	(1)
- * Club domestic league appearances and goals as of 16:19, 16 June 2024 (UTC)

Maximiliano Zárate Fagiuolo (born 4 February 1993) is an Argentine footballer who plays as a forward for Deportivo Llacuabamba.

== Career ==
Zárate began in the youth of Belgrano in 2007. He was promoted into the first-team in 2010 and was subsequently loaned out to Boca Río Gallegos of Torneo Argentino B but returned soon after following no appearances. In 2012, he joined Deportivo Maipú on a loan for the 2012–13 season. He played two times for the club in Torneo Argentino A. In June 2014, Zárate was loaned out for the third occasion, this time to Primera B Nacional team Sportivo Belgrano. He made his professional debut on 29 August in a 1–0 defeat to Temperley. Three further appearances followed as the club finished eleventh in Zone B.

On 23 August 2015, Zárate made his top-flight and Belgrano debut in an Argentine Primera División match with Rosario Central. On 3 February 2016, Flandria completed the loan signing of Zárate. He scored the first two goals of his career with Flandria in May 2016 in wins over Villa San Carlos and UAI Urquiza. He returned to Belgrano two months later after fourteen matches. Ahead of the 2016–17 Primera B Metropolitana campaign, Zárate agreed to join Comunicaciones in what would be his final loan away. Zárate went onto score seven goals in thirty-four games, including a hat-trick in a victory over Colegiales.

Four more goals followed for Comunicaciones in matches versus Talleres, Excursionistas, Tristán Suárez and Atlanta before, on 17 September 2017, Zárate departed Belgrano permanently as he agreed to join Torneo Federal A side San Lorenzo. His first appearance arrived two weeks later against Unión Villa Krause. Zárate terminated his contract with San Lorenzo on 3 March 2018. He spent the following nine months with Liga de Rio Cuarto team Acción Juvenil, prior to Zárate rejoining former club Comunicaciones on a free transfer in January 2019.

== Career statistics ==
As of 16 January 2019.

Club statistics
Club	Season	League			Cup		Continental		Other		Total	
Club	Season	Division	Apps	Goals	Apps	Goals	Apps	Goals	Apps	Goals	Apps	Goals
Belgrano	2010–11	Primera B Nacional	0	0	0	0	—		0	0	0	0
Belgrano	2011–12	Primera División	0	0	0	0	—		0	0	0	0
Belgrano	2012–13	Primera División	0	0	0	0	—		0	0	0	0
Belgrano	2013–14	Primera División	0	0	0	0	0	0	0	0	0	0
Belgrano	2014	Primera División	0	0	0	0	—		0	0	0	0
Belgrano	2015	Primera División	1	0	0	0	0	0	0	0	1	0
Belgrano	2016	Primera División	0	0	0	0	—		0	0	0	0
Belgrano	2016–17	Primera División	0	0	0	0	0	0	0	0	0	0
Belgrano	2017–18	Primera División	0	0	0	0	—		0	0	0	0
Belgrano	Total		1	0	0	0	0	0	0	0	1	0
Boca Río Gallegos (loan)	2010–11	Torneo Argentino A	0	0	0	0	—		0	0	0	0
Deportivo Maipú (loan)	2012–13	Torneo Argentino A	2	0	0	0	—		0	0	2	0
Sportivo Belgrano (loan)	2014	Primera B Nacional	4	0	0	0	—		0	0	4	0
Flandria (loan)	2016	Primera B Metropolitana	14	2	0	0	—		0	0	14	2
Comunicaciones (loan)	2016–17	Primera B Metropolitana	30	7	0	0	—		4 (Note: Appearance(s) in the Primera B Metropolitana play-offs)	0	34	7
San Lorenzo	2017–18	Torneo Federal A	16	3	0	0	—		0	0	16	3
Comunicaciones	2018–19	Primera B Metropolitana	0	0	0	0	—		0	0	0	0
Career total			67	12	0	0	0	0	4	0	71	12

== Honours ==
Flandria

- Primera B Metropolitana: 2016
