= Alexis Vaiani =

Argentine professional footballer

Personal information
- Full name: Alexis Emanuel Vaiani
- Date of birth: 30 April 1998 (age 28)
- Place of birth: Argentina
- Position: Forward

Youth career
- Nueva Chicago

Senior career*
Years	Team	Apps	(Gls)
2017–2019	Comunicaciones	11	(2)
2022	Pathumthani University		
- * Club domestic league appearances and goals

Alexis Emanuel Vaiani (born 30 April 1998) is an Argentine professional footballer who plays as a forward.

== Career ==
Vaiani got his career underway with Comunicaciones; having signed in 2017 from Nueva Chicago. His professional debut arrived in the 2017–18 campaign against Estudiantes on 12 September 2017, which preceded his first goal coming on 1 October during a two-nil win over Talleres. In total, Vaiani made five appearances in his opening season; all of which were off the substitutes bench. His first match as a starter arrived in a March 2019 loss to Almirante Brown. Vaiani left Comunicaciones in December 2019.

== Career statistics ==
As of 29 June 2020.

Appearances and goals by club, season and competition
Club	Season	League			Cup		League Cup		Continental		Other		Total	
Club	Season	Division	Apps	Goals	Apps	Goals	Apps	Goals	Apps	Goals	Apps	Goals	Apps	Goals
Comunicaciones	2017–18	Primera B Metropolitana	5	1	0	0	—		—		0	0	5	1
Comunicaciones	2018–19	Primera B Metropolitana	6	1	0	0	—		—		0	0	6	1
Comunicaciones	2019–20	Primera B Metropolitana	0	0	0	0	—		—		0	0	0	0
Career total			11	2	0	0	—		—		0	0	11	2
