= Daniel Franks =

Daniel Franks may refer to:

- Daniel "Bubba" Franks (born 1978), American football player
- Daniel Franks (BMX rider) (born 1993), New Zealand BMX rider
- Daniel M. Franks (born 1978), Australian development geologist

== See also ==
- Daniel Frank (disambiguation)
