= 2012–13 Primera B Metropolitana =

Primera B Metropolitana
- Season: 2012–13
- Champions: Villa San Carlos
- Promoted: Villa San Carlos; Brown (A)
- Relegated: San Telmo; Central Córdoba (R)
- Matches played: 426
- Goals scored: 895 (2.1 per match)
- Top goalscorer: (Argentina) Pablo Vegetti (24)

The 2012–13 Argentine Primera B Metropolitana was the 114th. season of Primera B Metropolitana, the third division of the Argentine football league system. The season began on 4 August 2012 and ended on 26 May 2013. A total of 21 clubs participated in the competition.

Villa San Carlos won their first Primera B Metro title promoting to Primera Nacional while Brown de Adrogué was the 2nd. team promoted to the upper division as winner of torneo reducido. It was Brown's first promotion ever.

On the other hand, San Telmo and Central Córdoba (R) were relegated to Primera C.

== Club information ==
Club	City	Province	Stadium
Acassuso	Boulogne	Buenos Aires	La Quema
Almagro	José Ingenieros	Buenos Aires	Tres de Febrero
Atlanta	Buenos Aires	autonomous city	León Kolbovski
Barracas Central	Buenos Aires	autonomous city	Barracas Central
Brown	Adrogué	Buenos Aires	Lorenzo Arandilla
Central Córdoba (R)	Rosario	Santa Fe	Gabino Sosa
Chacarita Juniors	Villa Maipú	Buenos Aires	Chacarita Juniors
Colegiales	Florida Oeste	Buenos Aires	Libertarios Unidos
Comunicaciones	Buenos Aires	autonomous city	Alfredo Ramos
Defensores de Belgrano	Buenos Aires	autonomous city	Juan Pasquale
Deportivo Armenio	Ingeniero Maschwitz	Buenos Aires	República de Armenia
Deportivo Morón	Morón	Buenos Aires	Nuevo Francisco Urbano
Estudiantes (BA)	Caseros	Buenos Aires	Ciudad de Caseros
Flandria	Jáuregui	Buenos Aires	Carlos V
Los Andes	Lomas de Zamora	Buenos Aires	Eduardo Gallardón
Platense	Florida	Buenos Aires	Ciudad de Vicente López
San Telmo	Dock Sud	Buenos Aires	Dr. Osvaldo Baletto
Temperley	Temperley	Buenos Aires	Alfredo Beranger
Tristán Suárez	Tristán Suárez	Buenos Aires	20 de Octubre
Villa Dálmine	Campana	Buenos Aires	Villa Dálmine
Villa San Carlos	Berisso	Buenos Aires	Gennasio Salice

== Table ==
=== Standings ===
Pos	Team	Pld	W	D	L	GF	GA	GD	Pts	Qualification
1	Villa San Carlos	40	19	15	6	41	26	+15	72	Primera B Nacional
2	Platense	40	20	10	10	39	30	+9	70	
3	Atlanta	40	17	14	9	48	39	+9	65	
4	Almagro	40	16	16	8	49	36	+13	64	
5	Brown	40	16	15	9	56	37	+19	63	Primera B Nacional
6	Estudiantes (BA)	40	17	12	11	46	31	+15	63	
7	Chacarita Juniors	40	16	12	12	47	39	+8	60	
8	Deportivo Armenio	40	14	16	10	52	41	+11	58	
9	Barracas Central	40	15	11	14	45	44	+1	56	
10	Temperley	40	14	13	13	38	35	+3	55	
11	Comunicaciones	40	13	15	12	41	41	0	54	
12	Tristán Suárez	40	11	17	12	40	44	−4	50	
13	Los Andes	40	12	12	16	31	39	−8	48	
14	Villa Dálmine	40	13	9	18	41	51	−10	48	
15	Flandria	40	12	12	16	40	54	−14	48	
16	Acassuso	40	12	12	16	32	51	−19	48	
17	Deportivo Morón	40	12	11	17	46	52	−6	47	
18	Colegiales	40	8	20	12	38	35	+3	44	
19	San Telmo	40	8	13	19	35	51	−16	37	
20	Defensores de Belgrano	40	7	14	19	33	47	−14	35	
21	Central Córdoba (R)	40	7	13	20	35	50	−15	34	

Updated to match(es) played on 23 June 2013. Source: AFA
Rules for classification: 1st points; 2nd goal difference; 3rd goals scored; 4th head-to-head points; 5th head-to-head goal difference; 6th head-to-head goals scored. This does not apply to determining the champion. If two or more teams had been tied in point at the end of the tournament, a playoff would have been held at a neutral venue within 72 hours for the championship

== Torneo Reducido ==
Teams placed 2nd. to 5th. participated in torneo reducido, a single-elimination tournament that began on semifinals.

=== Semifinals ===
Team 1	Agg.	Team 2	1st leg	2nd leg
Platense	2–2 (2–3 p)	Brown	1–1	1–1
Atlanta	1–3	Almagro	1–1	0–2

=== Promotion playoff ===
Torneo reducido finals
(second promotion playoff)
16 June 2013
11:00
First leg

Brown	2–0	Almagro
Villamayor 2'; Fabro 29' (pen.)	Report

Estadio Lorenzo Arandilla, Adrogué
Referee: Yamil Possi

23 June 2013
12:00
Second leg

Almagro	2–0	Brown
Peralta 15'; Vera 21'	Report
Penalties
Vera (penalty scored); Iglesias (penalty scored); Schunke (penalty missed); Pedrozo (penalty missed); Lillo (penalty scored); Franco (penalty missed)	3–4	Minadevino (penalty scored); Fabro (penalty scored); Bordachar (penalty scored); Unycio (penalty missed); Schmidt (penalty missed); Villamayor (penalty scored)

Estadio Tres de Febrero, José Ingenieros
Referee: Nicolás Lamolina

Team details

Almagro
Brown (A)

GK	(Argentina) Bruno Centeno
DF	(Argentina) Germán Lanaro
DF	(Argentina) Richard Schunke
DF	(Argentina) Daniel Franco
MF	(Argentina) Nahuel Basualdo
MF	(Argentina) Hernán Lillo
MF	(Argentina) Adrián J. Iglesias
MF	(Argentina) Lucas Sparapani
FW	(Argentina) Juan Pablo Peralta
FW	(Argentina) Fabricio Pedrozo
FW	(Argentina) Ricardo D. Vera
Manager:
(Argentina) Carlos Mayor

GK	(Argentina) José Burtovoy
DF	(Argentina) Joel Barbosa
DF	(Argentina) Guillermo Esteban
DF	(Argentina) Ernesto P. Del Castillo
DF	(Argentina) Gastón Schmidt
MF	(Argentina) Martín Fabro
MF	(Argentina) Leonel Unyicio
MF	(Argentina) Oscar A. Villamayor
MF	(Argentina) Facundo Lemmo
FW	(Argentina) Cristian Bordacahar
FW	(Argentina) Jonatan Tridente
Manager:
(Argentina) Pablo Vicó

Brown promoted to Primera B Nacional as winner of torneo reducido after winning the penalty shoot-out.

== Relegation ==
Pos	Team	2010–11 Pts	2011–12 Pts	2012–13 Pts	Total Pts	Total Pld	Avg	Relegation
1	Atlanta	86	—	65	151	82	1.841	
2	Estudiantes (BA)	73	72	63	208	122	1.705	
3	Brown	70	69	63	202	122	1.656	
4	Villa San Carlos	60	54	72	186	122	1.525	
5	Platense	53	61	70	184	122	1.508	
6	Chacarita Juniors	—	—	60	60	40	1.5	
7	Almagro	58	54	64	176	122	1.443	
8	Comunicaciones	60	60	54	174	122	1.426	
9	Deportivo Armenio	65	50	58	173	122	1.418	
10	Colegiales	53	73	44	170	122	1.393	
11	Barracas Central	64	40	56	160	122	1.311	
12	Acassuso	56	55	48	159	122	1.303	
13	Flandria	54	50	48	152	122	1.246	
14	Defensores de Belgrano	71	41	35	147	122	1.205	
15	Villa Dálmine	—	—	48	48	40	1.2	
16	Temperley	44	46	55	145	122	1.189	
17	Deportivo Morón	61	35	47	143	122	1.172	
18	Los Andes	34	61	48	143	122	1.172	
19	Tristán Suárez	46	45	50	141	122	1.156	
20	San Telmo	42	47	37	126	122	1.033	Primera C Metropolitana
21	Central Córdoba (R)	—	—	34	34	40	0.85	Primera C Metropolitana

== See also ==
- 2012–13 in Argentine football
