= Tomás Gramisci =

Argentine professional footballer

Personal information
- Full name: Tomás Ezequiel Gramisci
- Date of birth: 28 March 1998 (age 28)
- Place of birth: Argentina
- Position: Defender

Team information
- Current team: Comunicaciones

Youth career
- San Lorenzo
- 2017–2018: Fénix

Senior career*
Years	Team	Apps	(Gls)
2018–	Comunicaciones	6	(0)
- * Club domestic league appearances and goals as of 00:08, 11 May 2019 (UTC)

Tomás Ezequiel Gramisci (born 28 March 1998) is an Argentine professional footballer who plays as a defender for Comunicaciones.

== Career ==
Gramisci played for the academies of San Lorenzo and Fénix, joining the latter in 2017. In 2018, Gramisci joined Comunicaciones of Primera B Metropolitana. He made his opening appearances in professional football in December 2018, as he featured for the full duration of home fixtures with Sacachispas and Tristán Suárez.

== Career statistics ==
As of 11 May 2019.

Appearances and goals by club, season and competition
Club	Season	League			Cup		League Cup		Continental		Other		Total	
Club	Season	Division	Apps	Goals	Apps	Goals	Apps	Goals	Apps	Goals	Apps	Goals	Apps	Goals
Comunicaciones	2018–19	Primera B Metropolitana	6	0	0	0	—		—		0	0	6	0
Career total			6	0	0	0	—		—		0	0	6	0
