= Marcos Landáburu =

Argentine professional footballer

Personal information
- Full name: Marcos Nahuel Landáburu
- Date of birth: 26 August 2000 (age 26)
- Place of birth: Buenos Aires, Argentina
- Height: 1.86 m (6 ft 1 in)
- Position: Forward

Team information
- Current team: Atlas

Youth career
- San Telmo

Senior career*
Years	Team	Apps	(Gls)
2020–2022	San Telmo	6	(0)
2020–2021	→ Independiente (loan)	3	(0)
2023	Atlas	23	(14)
2023–	Llaneros F.C.	16	(5)
- * Club domestic league appearances and goals as of 18 july 2023 (UTC)

Marcos Nahuel Landáburu (born 26 August 2000) is an Argentine professional footballer who plays as a centre-forward for Llaneros F.C.

== Career ==
Landáburu started his career in the youth system of San Telmo. In January 2020, Landáburu left the Primera B Metropolitana club to join Independiente of the Primera División on loan for twelve months. He initially featured for their reserves, but was moved into the first-team after the COVID-19 enforced break. After scoring a goal in pre-season against Gimnasia y Esgrima, the centre-forward made his senior debut on 15 November in a goalless draw away to Defensa y Justicia in the Copa de la Liga Profesional; he had been an unused substitute in four prior matches.

== Career statistics ==
As of 16 November 2020.

Appearances and goals by club, season and competition
Club	Season	League			Cup		League Cup		Continental		Other		Total	
Club	Season	Division	Apps	Goals	Apps	Goals	Apps	Goals	Apps	Goals	Apps	Goals	Apps	Goals
San Telmo	2020–21	Primera B Metropolitana	0	0	0	0	—		—		0	0	0	0
Independiente (loan)	2020–21 (Note: Soccerway counts Copa de la Liga Profesional appearances as league appearances.)	Primera División	1	0	0	0	0	0	0	0	0	0	1	0
Career total			1	0	0	0	0	0	0	0	0	0	1	0
