= Angel David Alonso =

Paraguayan football defender (born 1985)

Personal information
- Date of birth: 30 November 1985 (age 40)
- Place of birth: Paraguay
- Height: 1.75 m (5 ft 9 in)
- Position: Defender

Team information
- Current team: Comunicaciones

Senior career*
Years	Team	Apps	(Gls)
2013–	Comunicaciones	9	(0)
- * Club domestic league appearances and goals as of 20 October 2013

Angel David Alonso (born 30 November 1985) is a Paraguayan association football defender currently playing for Comunicaciones of the Primera B Metropolitana in Argentina.

== Teams ==
- Libertad 2003–2005
- General Caballero 2005
- 2 de Mayo 2006
- Nacional 2006–2008
- Silvio Pettirossi 2008–2009
- General Caballero 2010
- Los Andes 2011–2013
- Comunicaciones 2013–present
