= Mauricio Soto =

Argentine footballer (born 1986)

Personal information
- Full name: Mauricio Leonicio Soto
- Date of birth: 22 February 1986 (age 40)
- Place of birth: Berazategui, Argentina
- Position: Midfielder

Senior career*
Years	Team	Apps	(Gls)
2007–2010	Berazategui	42	(5)
2009	→ Liniers (loan)	12	(3)
2009	→ Deportivo Riestra (loan)	15	(1)
2010–2013	San Martín	79	(16)
2013	Sacachispas	4	(0)
2014	Juventud Unida	19	(2)
2014–2021	Deportivo Riestra	196	(7)
- * Club domestic league appearances and goals as of 10:22, 17 July 2022 (UTC)

Mauricio Leonicio Soto (born 22 February 1986) is an Argentine professional footballer who plays as a midfielder.

== Career ==
Soto began his career in senior football with hometown club Berazategui. He featured twenty-four times throughout the 2007–08 campaign in Primera D Metropolitana, netting four goals as they won promotion to Primera C Metropolitana. One goal in thirteen games followed. In 2009, Soto had loan spells away with Liniers and Deportivo Riestra. Four total goals arrived, prior to Soto returning to Berazategui. Months later, fellow Primera D Metropolitana team San Martín signed Soto. Sixteen goals in seventy-nine fixtures came in three years. Across 2013 and 2014, Soto had stints with Sacachispas and Juventud Unida.

Soto rejoined Deportivo Riestra on 30 June 2014, with the club now in Primera C Metropolitana. They won promotion to Primera B Metropolitana in his first season, with the player netting goals against Deportivo Morón and Almagro in the succeeding campaign. Overall, Soto participated in ninety-one matches at that level across 2015, 2016 and 2016–17. After they were promoted in the latter, Soto featured twenty-two times in the 2017–18 Primera B Nacional as they suffered relegation.

== Career statistics ==
As of 4 June 2019.

Appearances and goals by club, season and competition
Club	Season	League			Cup		League Cup		Continental		Other		Total	
Club	Season	Division	Apps	Goals	Apps	Goals	Apps	Goals	Apps	Goals	Apps	Goals	Apps	Goals
Berazategui	2007–08	Primera D Metropolitana	24	4	0	0	—		—		0	0	24	4
Berazategui	2008–09	Primera C Metropolitana	13	1	0	0	—		—		0	0	13	1
Berazategui	2009–10	Primera C Metropolitana	5	0	0	0	—		—		0	0	5	0
Berazategui	Total		42	5	0	0	—		—		0	0	42	5
Liniers (loan)	2008–09	Primera D Metropolitana	12	3	0	0	—		—		0	0	12	3
Deportivo Riestra (loan)	2009–10	Primera D Metropolitana	14	1	0	0	—		—		0	0	14	1
San Martín	2010–11	Primera D Metropolitana	21	4	0	0	—		—		0	0	21	4
San Martín	2011–12	Primera D Metropolitana	25	2	0	0	—		—		0	0	25	2
San Martín	2012–13	Primera D Metropolitana	33	10	0	0	—		—		0	0	33	10
San Martín	Total		79	16	0	0	—		—		0	0	79	16
Sacachispas	2013–14	Primera C Metropolitana	4	0	0	0	—		—		0	0	4	0
Juventud Unida	2013–14	Primera D Metropolitana	19	2	1	1	—		—		0	0	20	3
Deportivo Riestra	2014	Primera C Metropolitana	19	3	0	0	—		—		0	0	19	3
Deportivo Riestra	2015	Primera B Metropolitana	41	2	3	1	—		—		0	0	44	3
Deportivo Riestra	2016	Primera B Metropolitana	14	0	0	0	—		—		0	0	14	0
Deportivo Riestra	2016–17	Primera B Metropolitana	28	1	0	0	—		—		5 (Note: Appearance(s) in the Primera B Metropolitana play-offs)	0	33	1
Deportivo Riestra	2017–18	Primera B Nacional	22	0	1	0	—		—		0	0	23	0
Deportivo Riestra	2018–19	Primera B Metropolitana	27	0	1	0	—		—		0	0	28	0
Deportivo Riestra	Total		151	8	5	1	—		—		5	0	161	9
Career total			321	35	6	2	—		—		5	0	332	37
