= Santiago Nagüel =

Argentine footballer

Personal information
- Full name: Carlos Santiago Nagüel
- Date of birth: 28 January 1993 (age 33)
- Place of birth: Buenos Aires, Argentina
- Height: 1.69 m (5 ft 6 1/2 in)
- Position: Midfielder

Team information
- Current team: Costa Orientale Sarda
- Number: 27

Youth career
- Club Almafuerte
- 2003–2011: Argentinos Juniors

Senior career*
Years	Team	Apps	(Gls)
2011–2015	Argentinos Juniors	69	(2)
2015–2019	Racing	10	(0)
2016	→ Unión Santa Fe (loan)	3	(0)
2016	→ Defensa y Justicia (loan)	1	(0)
2017–2018	→ Brown (loan)	16	(1)
2019	Atenas	21	(9)
2020	Maldonado	5	(0)
2021	Morón	11	(0)
2022	San Telmo	30	(1)
2023–	Costa Orientale Sarda	3	(0)
- * Club domestic league appearances and goals as of 24 September 2023

Carlos Santiago Nagüel (born 28 January 1993) is an Argentine professional footballer who plays as a midfielder for Italian Serie D club Costa Orientale Sarda.

== Career ==
Nagüel started his youth career with Club Almafuerte, before joining Argentinos Juniors in 2003. Eight years later, he began his senior career with Argentinos Juniors. He made his senior debut in an Argentine Primera División defeat to Atlético de Rafaela on 25 October, before netting his first goal two appearances later during a victory at home to Olimpo. In total, Nagüel featured sixty-two times in his opening three seasons with Argentinos Juniors. The club were relegated in 2013–14, he subsequently made seven appearances in Primera B Nacional prior to departing to join top-flight team Racing Club in February 2015.

Thirteen appearances in all competitions followed in his debut campaign of 2015. 2016 saw Nagüel loaned out twice by Racing Club. He joined Unión Santa Fe on 19 January and went onto make just four appearances before returning to his parent club. In July, Defensa y Justicia temporarily signed Nagüel. Similarly as to with Unión Santa Fe, he struggled for match time and left following only one appearance (vs. Vélez Sarsfield on 13 November). On 13 September 2017, Primera B Nacional side Brown became Nagüel's third loan club. He scored on his debut appearance in a 0–1 win over Almagro in September.

In February 2019, Nagüel switched Argentina for Uruguay by agreeing a move to Atenas of the Segunda División. Nagüel then had a spell with Deportivo Maldonado from February 2020, before returning to Argentina and signing with Deportivo Morón in March 2021. Ahead of the 2022 season, Nagüel joined San Telmo.

== Career statistics ==
As of 24 February 2019.

Club statistics
Club	Season	League			Cup		Continental		Other		Total	
Club	Season	Division	Apps	Goals	Apps	Goals	Apps	Goals	Apps	Goals	Apps	Goals
Argentinos Juniors	2011–12	Primera División	12	2	2	0	0	0	0	0	14	2
Argentinos Juniors	2012–13	Primera División	27	0	0	0	1 (Note: Appearance(s) in the Copa Sudamericana)	0	0	0	28	0
Argentinos Juniors	2013–14	Primera División	23	0	0	0	—		0	0	23	0
Argentinos Juniors	2014	Primera B Nacional	7	0	3	0	—		0	0	10	0
Argentinos Juniors	Total		69	2	5	0	1	0	0	0	75	2
Racing Club	2015	Primera División	10	0	2	0	1 (Note: Appearance(s) in the Copa Libertadores)	0	0	0	13	0
Racing Club	2016	Primera División	0	0	0	0	0	0	0	0	0	0
Racing Club	2016–17	Primera División	0	0	0	0	0	0	0	0	0	0
Racing Club	2017–18	Primera División	0	0	0	0	0	0	0	0	0	0
Racing Club	2018–19	Primera División	0	0	0	0	0	0	0	0	0	0
Racing Club	Total		10	0	2	0	1	0	0	0	13	0
Unión Santa Fe (loan)	2016	Primera División	3	0	1	0	—		0	0	4	0
Defensa y Justicia (loan)	2016–17	Primera División	1	0	0	0	0	0	0	0	1	0
Brown (loan)	2017–18	Primera B Nacional	16	1	0	0	—		1 (Note: Appearance(s) in the Primera B Nacional play-offs)	0	17	1
Atenas	2019	Segunda División	0	0	—		—		0	0	0	0
Career total			99	3	8	0	2	0	1	0	110	3
