= Daniel Frank =

Daniel Frank may refer to:

- Daniel Frank (athlete) (1882–1965), American athlete
- Daniel Frank (ice hockey) (born 1994), Italian ice hockey player
- Dan Frank (1954–2021), American editorial director

== See also ==
- Daniel Franco (disambiguation)
- Daniel Franks (disambiguation)
