= Enzo Oviedo =

Argentine professional footballer

Personal information
- Full name: Enzo Rubén Oviedo
- Date of birth: 6 April 1994 (age 32)
- Place of birth: Argentina
- Position: Central midfielder

Team information
- Current team: Club Luján

Youth career
- Lanús

Senior career*
Years	Team	Apps	(Gls)
2015–2016	Victoriano Arenas	36	(1)
2016–2018	Leandro N. Alem	64	(3)
2018–2019	Comunicaciones	34	(1)
2020	Gimnasia y Esgrima	6	(0)
2021	Atlas	6	(1)
2021	Gimnasia y Esgrima	0	(0)
2022-2023	Club Luján		
2024-2025	Atlas		(1)
2025-	Club Luján		
- * Club domestic league appearances and goals as of 17:45, 31 July 2021 (UTC)

Enzo Rubén Oviedo (born 6 April 1994) is an Argentine professional footballer who plays as a central midfielder for Club Luján.

== Career ==
Oviedo, after passing through Lanús' academy, began his senior career with Primera D Metropolitana's Victoriano Arenas. One goal in thirty-six matches arrived across the 2015 and 2016 seasons. In June 2016, Oviedo agreed to join fellow fifth tier team Leandro N. Alem. He appeared twenty-nine times in his first season with the club, as they secured promotion to Primera C Metropolitana for 2017–18. After three goals in tier four, Oviedo moved up to Primera B Metropolitana with Comunicaciones. He made his bow in August 2018 versus Acassuso, while his first goal came months later against Deportivo Español in a win.

Gimnasia y Esgrima became Oviedo's fourth senior club in January 2020. He was sent off in his second appearance against Sportivo Las Parejas on 2 February.

== Career statistics ==
As of July 2020.

Appearances and goals by club, season and competition
Club	Season	League			Cup		League Cup		Continental		Other		Total	
Club	Season	Division	Apps	Goals	Apps	Goals	Apps	Goals	Apps	Goals	Apps	Goals	Apps	Goals
Leandro N. Alem	2016–17	Primera D Metropolitana	28	0	1	0	—		—		0	0	29	0
Leandro N. Alem	2017–18	Primera C Metropolitana	36	3	0	0	—		—		0	0	36	3
Leandro N. Alem	Total		64	3	1	0	—		—		0	0	65	3
Comunicaciones	2018–19	Primera B Metropolitana	28	1	0	0	—		—		0	0	28	1
Comunicaciones	2019–20	Primera B Metropolitana	6	0	0	0	—		—		0	0	6	0
Comunicaciones	Total		34	1	0	0	—		—		0	0	34	1
Gimnasia y Esgrima	2019–20	Torneo Federal A	6	0	0	0	—		—		0	0	6	0
Career total			104	4	1	0	—		—		0	0	105	4
