= Fabricio Pedrozo =

Argentine professional footballer

Personal information
- Full name: Fabricio Gabriel Pedrozo
- Date of birth: 6 November 1992 (age 34)
- Place of birth: Eldorado, Argentina
- Height: 1.78 m (5 ft 10 in)
- Position: Forward

Team information
- Current team: APOEL
- Number: 15

Youth career
- Unión de Puerto Iguazú
- Proyecto Crecer
- San Lorenzo

Senior career*
Years	Team	Apps	(Gls)
2011–2017	San Lorenzo	3	(0)
2012–2013	→ Almagro (loan)	11	(6)
2013–2014	→ Aldosivi (loan)	15	(2)
2014–2015	→ Atlanta (loan)	53	(11)
2016	→ Crucero del Norte (loan)	20	(3)
2016–2017	→ The Strongest (loan)	28	(4)
2017–2022	Atlanta	132	(20)
2022–2024	AEL	53	(15)
2024–2026	Levadiakos	58	(16)
2026–	APOEL	7	(6)
- * Club domestic league appearances and goals as of 26 October 2026

Fabricio Gabriel Pedrozo (born 6 November 1992) is an Argentine professional footballer who plays as a forward for Cypriot First Division club APOEL.

On 6 July 2026, Fabricio Pedrozo agreed in principle to join APOEL, subject to the completion of the transfer.

== Career ==
Pedrozo played for the academies of Unión de Puerto Iguazú and Proyecto Crecer before joining San Lorenzo. He previously had trials with Boca Juniors, Bordeaux and Real Madrid. Pedrozo featured three times in the Primera División, starting in a defeat to Tigre on 24 April 2011 prior to coming off the substitutes bench in fixtures with Newell's Old Boys and Banfield. In July 2012, Pedrozo completed a loan move to Primera B Metropolitana's Almagro. He made just one appearance in his first seven months, though eventually played fifteen times by the end of the 2012–13 campaign; which he also ended with six goals.

On 30 June 2013, Pedrozo joined Aldosivi of Primera B Nacional on loan. A year later, Pedrozo signed a two-season loan deal with Atlanta where he'd score eleven goals across the 2014 and 2015 seasons in the third tier. After a fourth spell away with Crucero del Norte in the first part of 2016, Pedrozo left to join Bolivian Primera División side The Strongest for a final loan out. Twenty-nine games, as well as six in the Copa Libertadores, arrived in Bolivia's top-flight alongside goals against Nacional Potosí, Blooming, San José and Bolívar; winning the 2016–17 Apertura in the process. Atlanta resigned Pedrozo in 2018.

On 6 July 2026, Fabricio Pedrozo reached an agreement in principle to join APOEL. The Cypriot club announced the agreement and welcomed the Argentine footballer, with the transfer expected to be completed following the necessary formalities.

== Career statistics ==
As of 30 April 2019.

Appearances and goals by club, season and competition
Club	Season	League			Cup		League Cup		Continental		Other		Total	
Club	Season	Division	Apps	Goals	Apps	Goals	Apps	Goals	Apps	Goals	Apps	Goals	Apps	Goals
San Lorenzo	2010–11	Argentine Primera División	3	0	0	0	—		—		0	0	3	0
San Lorenzo	2011–12	Argentine Primera División	0	0	0	0	—		—		0	0	0	0
San Lorenzo	2012–13	Argentine Primera División	0	0	0	0	—		—		0	0	0	0
San Lorenzo	2013–14	Argentine Primera División	0	0	0	0	—		0	0	0	0	0	0
San Lorenzo	2014	Argentine Primera División	0	0	0	0	—		0	0	0	0	0	0
San Lorenzo	2015	Argentine Primera División	0	0	0	0	—		0	0	0	0	0	0
San Lorenzo	2016	Argentine Primera División	0	0	0	0	—		0	0	0	0	0	0
San Lorenzo	2016–17	Argentine Primera División	0	0	0	0	—		0	0	0	0	0	0
San Lorenzo	Total		3	0	0	0	—		0	0	0	0	3	0
Almagro (loan)	2012–13	Primera B Metropolitana	11	6	0	0	—		—		4 (Note: Appearance(s) in the Primera B Metropolitana play-offs)	0	15	6
Aldosivi (loan)	2013–14	Primera B Nacional	15	2	2	0	—		—		0	0	17	2
Atlanta (loan)	2014	Primera B Metropolitana	16	4	0	0	—		—		0	0	16	4
Atlanta (loan)	2015	Primera B Metropolitana	37	7	5	1	—		—		1	0	43	8
Atlanta (loan)	Total		53	11	5	1	—		—		1	0	59	12
Crucero del Norte (loan)	2016	Primera B Nacional	20	3	1	0	—		—		0	0	21	3
The Strongest (loan)	2016–17	Bolivian Primera División	28	4	—		—		6 (Note: Appearance(s) in the Copa Libertadores)	0	1 (Note: Appearance(s) in the Primera División play-offs)	1	35	5
Atlanta	2017–18	Primera B Metropolitana	25	3	3	1	—		—		1	0	29	4
Atlanta	2018–19	Primera B Metropolitana	27	5	1	0	—		—		0	0	28	5
Atlanta	Total		52	8	4	1	—		—		1	0	57	9
Career total			182	34	12	2	—		6	0	7	1	207	37

== Honours ==
The Strongest

- Bolivian Primera División: 2016–17 Apertura
