= Franco Perinciolo =

Argentine professional footballer

Personal information
- Full name: Franco Alejandro Perinciolo
- Date of birth: 30 April 1997 (age 29)
- Place of birth: Argentina
- Position: Midfielder

Team information
- Current team: Chaco For Ever

Youth career
- Banfield

Senior career*
Years	Team	Apps	(Gls)
2018	Cañuelas	20	(7)
2018–2019	Comunicaciones	23	(1)
2019–2020	Sacachispas	14	(0)
2020–2022	Aldosivi	8	(0)
2022	→ Atlanta (loan)	24	(0)
2023	Brown Adrogué	30	(0)
2024–	Chaco For Ever	42	(1)
- * Club domestic league appearances and goals as of 17:16, 22 July 2025 (UTC)

Franco Alejandro Perinciolo (born 30 April 1997) is an Argentine professional footballer who plays as a midfielder for Chaco For Ever.

== Career ==
Perinciolo is a product of the Banfield youth system. In 2018, Perinciolo departed to join Cañuelas of Primera C Metropolitana. Seven goals, which included a hat-trick over Justo José de Urquiza, in twenty matches followed after he joined mid-season, with the club making the promotion play-offs; though would lose in round one to Central Córdoba. On 24 July 2018, Perinciolo was signed by Primera B Metropolitana side Comunicaciones. He scored on his debut for them, netting in a 3–1 defeat to Estudiantes on 8 September. July 2019 saw Perinciolo move across the third tier to Sacachispas. Fourteen appearances followed.

On 23 July 2020, Perinciolo was signed by Primera División side Aldosivi. With only eight appearances in one and a half years, Perinciolo was loaned out to Atlanta in January 2022 for the rest of the year.

== Career statistics ==
As of 29 August 2020.

Appearances and goals by club, season and competition
Club	Season	League			Cup		League Cup		Continental		Other		Total	
Club	Season	Division	Apps	Goals	Apps	Goals	Apps	Goals	Apps	Goals	Apps	Goals	Apps	Goals
Cañuelas	2017–18	Primera C Metropolitana	20	7	0	0	—		—		0	0	20	7
Comunicaciones	2018–19	Primera B Metropolitana	23	1	0	0	—		—		0	0	23	1
Sacachispas	2019–20	Primera B Metropolitana	14	0	0	0	—		—		0	0	14	0
Aldosivi	2020–21	Primera División	0	0	0	0	—		—		0	0	0	0
Career total			57	8	0	0	—		—		0	0	57	8
