= Hernán Salazar =

Argentine footballer

Personal information
- Full name: Hernán Matías Salazar
- Date of birth: May 2, 1990 (age 36)
- Place of birth: Isidro Casanova, Argentina
- Height: 1.72 m (5 ft 8 in)
- Position: Striker

Team information
- Current team: San Martín Formosa

Senior career*
Years	Team	Apps	(Gls)
2008–2014	Argentinos Juniors	6	(0)
2010–2011	→ El Linqueño (loan)	?	(?)
2012	→ Deportivo Español (loan)	?	(?)
2012–2013	→ General Lamadrid (loan)	?	(?)
2014–2016	Almirante Brown	35	(10)
2016–2019	Comunicaciones	67	(10)
2019–	San Martín Formosa	10	(2)
- * Club domestic league appearances and goals as of 22:11, 14 May 2019 (UTC)

Hernán Matías Salazar (born 2 May 1990 in Isidro Casanova) is an Argentine football striker currently playing for San Martín Formosa.

== Career ==
Salazar made his professional debut in a 1–1 draw with Gimnasia de Jujuy on September 20, 2008. In 2010, he was a non-playing member of the squad that won the Clausura 2010 championship.
