= Ramiro Luna =

Argentine professional footballer

Personal information
- Full name: Ramiro Braian Luna
- Date of birth: 21 July 1995 (age 31)
- Place of birth: General Rodríguez, Argentina
- Height: 1.78 m (5 ft 10 in)
- Position: Winger

Team information
- Current team: Quilmes

Youth career
- Leandro N. Alem

Senior career*
Years	Team	Apps	(Gls)
2013–2019	Leandro N. Alem	129	(15)
2019–2024	Ferrocarril Midland	25	(1)
2020–2021	→ Arsenal Sarandí (loan)	10	(2)
2022–2023	→ San Telmo (loan)	65	(9)
2024–	Quilmes	45	(1)
2025	→ Orense (loan)	19	(1)
- * Club domestic league appearances and goals as of 20 August 2025

Ramiro Braian Luna (born 21 July 1995) is an Argentine professional footballer who plays as a winger for Quilmes.

== Career ==
Luna started his career with Leandro N. Alem in Primera D Metropolitana. He remained for six years, making one hundred and twenty-nine appearances and scoring fifteen times; including nine goals in sixty-nine matches in his final two seasons in Primera C Metropolitana; after promotion in 2016–17. July 2019 saw Luna join fellow fourth tier team Ferrocarril Midland. One goal in twenty-five games followed. In September 2020, Luna was signed on loan by Primera División side Arsenal de Sarandí. He made his top-flight debut on 14 November, featuring for sixty-seven minutes of an away win against Racing Club.

For Arsenal, Luna scored his first two top-flight goals on 3 January 2021 away against Independiente, after he came off the bench to net twice in the final seventeen minutes of a 4–3 victory in the Copa de la Liga Profesional.

In January 2022, Luna was loaned out to San Telmo until the end of 2022.

== Career statistics ==
As of 9 May 2025.

Appearances and goals by club, season and competition
Club	Division	League			Cup		Continental		Total	
Club	Division	Season	Apps	Goals	Apps	Goals	Apps	Goals	Apps	Goals
Leandro N. Alem	Primera D Metropolitana	2013-14	15	0	1	0	—		16	0
Leandro N. Alem	Primera D Metropolitana	2014	0	0	0	0	—		0	0
Leandro N. Alem	Primera D Metropolitana	2015	0	0	0	0	—		0	0
Leandro N. Alem	Primera D Metropolitana	2016	13	2	—		—		13	2
Leandro N. Alem	Primera D Metropolitana	2016-17	32	4	1	0	—		33	4
Leandro N. Alem	Primera C Metropolitana	2017-18	36	9	—		—		36	9
Leandro N. Alem	Primera C Metropolitana	2018-19	36	0	—		—		36	0
Leandro N. Alem	Total		130	15	2	0	—		132	15
Ferrocarril Midland	Primera C Metropolitana	2019-20	26	1	—		—		26	1
Arsenal Sarandí	Primera División	2020	—		7	2	—		7	2
Arsenal Sarandí	Primera División	2021	1	0	3	0	1	0	5	0
Arsenal Sarandí	Total		1	0	10	2	1	0	12	2
San Telmo	Primera B Nacional	2022	31	2	—		—		31	2
San Telmo	Primera B Nacional	2023	34	8	—		—		34	8
San Telmo	Total		65	10	—		—		65	10
Quilmes	Primera B Nacional	2024	38	1	1	0	—		39	1
Orense	Serie A	2025	8	0	0	0	0	0	8	0
Career total			268	27	13	2	1	0	282	29
