= Diego Casoppero =

Argentine professional footballer

Personal information
- Full name: Diego Nahuel Casoppero
- Date of birth: 27 November 1998 (age 27)
- Place of birth: Argentina
- Height: 1.87 m (6 ft 2 in)
- Position: Midfielder

Team information
- Current team: Comunicaciones

Senior career*
Years	Team	Apps	(Gls)
2017–	Comunicaciones	27	(2)
- * Club domestic league appearances and goals as of 22:49, 11 May 2019 (UTC)

Diego Nahuel Casoppero (born 27 November 1998) is an Argentine professional footballer who plays as a midfielder for Comunicaciones.

== Career ==
Casoppero got his senior career underway in Primera B Metropolitana with Comunicaciones. His first appearance arrived on 12 September 2017 in a 0–2 win over Estudiantes, with a further seven matches following before he scored his opening goals - as he netted a brace in a victory away to San Miguel on 2 February 2018. In total, Casoppero featured thirteen times in the 2017–18 campaign.

== Career statistics ==
As of 11 May 2019.

Appearances and goals by club, season and competition
Club	Season	League			Cup		League Cup		Continental		Other		Total	
Club	Season	Division	Apps	Goals	Apps	Goals	Apps	Goals	Apps	Goals	Apps	Goals	Apps	Goals
Comunicaciones	2017–18	Primera B Metropolitana	13	2	0	0	—		—		0	0	13	2
Comunicaciones	2018–19	Primera B Metropolitana	14	0	0	0	—		—		0	0	14	0
Career total			27	2	0	0	—		—		0	0	27	2
