= Leonardo Carboni =

Argentine footballer

Personal information
- Full name: Leonardo Ezequiel Carboni
- Date of birth: November 4, 1984 (age 42)
- Place of birth: Córdoba, Argentina
- Height: 1.84 m (6 ft 1/2 in)
- Position: Striker

Team information
- Current team: Bruno's Magpies

Senior career*
| Years | Team | Apps | (Gls) |
| 2005 | Quilmes | 0 | (0) |
| 2006 | Argentino de Quilmes | 9 | (2) |
| 2006–2007 | Brown de Adrogué | 27 | (4) |
| 2007–2008 | Estudiantes de Río Cuarto | 17 | (4) |
| 2008–2009 | Estudiantes | 33 | (10) |
| 2009–2012 | Nueva Chicago | 118 | (35) |
| 2012–2013 | Danubio | 24 | (7) |
| 2013–2014 | Independiente Rivadavia | 22 | (4) |
| 2014–2015 | Atlético Venezuela | 26 | (6) |
| 2015–2016 | Universitario de Sucre | 34 | (10) |
| 2016–2017 | Villa Dálmine | 26 | (3) |
| 2017–2018 | Talleres (RE) | 21 | (4) |
| 2018–2020 | Mons Calpe | 29 | (20) |
| 2020 | St Joseph's | 2 | (0) |
| 2020–2021 | Bruno's Magpies | 0 | (0) |
| 2021 | San Roque | 8 | (3) |
| 2021– | Bruno's Magpies | 0 | (0) |
- * Club domestic league appearances and goals as of 23:25, 2 January 2021 (UTC)

Leonardo Ezequiel Carboni (born November 4, 1984) is an Argentine footballer who plays as a striker for Bruno's Magpies in the Gibraltar National League.

== Career ==
Carboni played a vital role in Nueva Chicago during the 2011–12 season of Primera B Metropolitana scoring 15 goals and helping his team to achieve the promotion to the Primera B Nacional.

In July 2012, he signed a new deal with Uruguayan Primera División side Danubio F.C. He scored his first goal in the club on 7 August 2012, in a 2–1 away loss in the 2012 Copa Sudamericana against Olimpia. Carboni missed several matches through suspension and injury but led the club in goals.
