= Lucas Banegas =

Argentine professional footballer

Personal information
- Full name: Lucas Fernando Banegas
- Date of birth: 18 December 1979 (age 46)
- Place of birth: Buenos Aires, Argentina
- Height: 1.83 m (6 ft 0 in)
- Position: Defender

Team information
- Current team: Comunicaciones

Youth career
- Deportivo Merlo

Senior career*
Years	Team	Apps	(Gls)
2003–2004	Deportivo Merlo	40	(3)
2004–2009	Comunicaciones		
2009	Tristán Suárez	7	(0)
2010–2011	Comunicaciones		
2012–2013	Nueva Chicago	63	(3)
2013–	Comunicaciones	284	(36)
- * Club domestic league appearances and goals as of 17:42, 4 September 2022 (UTC)

Lucas Fernando Banegas (born 18 December 1979) is an Argentine professional footballer who plays as a defender for Comunicaciones.

== Career ==
Banegas played for Deportivo Merlo in Primera C Metropolitana between 2003 and 2004, featuring in a total of forty matches whilst scoring three times. In 2004, Comunicaciones signed Banegas. He remained for five years, with his first campaign concluding with promotion to Primera B Metropolitana. Banegas moved across the third tier to Tristán Suárez in 2009. Seven appearances followed, with Banegas subsequently spending twelves months back with Comunicaciones. In January 2012, Banegas joined Nueva Chicago. They won promotion from the 2011–12 Primera B Metropolitana, as the defender scored once in thirty-six games.

After netting goals against Huracán and Defensa y Justicia in Primera B Nacional, Banegas rejoined Comunicaciones for a third spell on 4 July 2013. He appeared one hundred and seventy-five times across the succeeding six seasons, while also scoring twenty-five goals for the Agronomía outfit; which included braces over UAI Urquiza and Fénix.

== Career statistics ==
As of 10 May 2019.

Appearances and goals by club, season and competition
Club	Season	League			Cup		League Cup		Continental		Other		Total	
Club	Season	Division	Apps	Goals	Apps	Goals	Apps	Goals	Apps	Goals	Apps	Goals	Apps	Goals
Deportivo Merlo	2003–04	Primera C Metropolitana	40	3	0	0	—		—		0	0	40	3
Tristán Suárez	2009–10	Primera B Metropolitana	7	0	0	0	—		—		0	0	7	0
Nueva Chicago	2011–12	Primera B Metropolitana	36	1	0	0	—		—		2 (Note: Appearance(s) in the Primera B Metropolitana play-offs)	0	38	1
Nueva Chicago	2012–13	Primera B Nacional	27	2	0	0	—		—		0	0	27	2
Nueva Chicago	Total		63	3	0	0	—		—		2	0	65	3
Comunicaciones	2013–14	Primera B Metropolitana	30	2	1	0	—		—		0	0	31	2
Comunicaciones	2014	Primera B Metropolitana	19	2	1	0	—		—		0	0	20	2
Comunicaciones	2015	Primera B Metropolitana	38	7	1	0	—		—		0	0	39	7
Comunicaciones	2016	Primera B Metropolitana	19	4	0	0	—		—		0	0	19	4
Comunicaciones	2016–17	Primera B Metropolitana	32	7	0	0	—		—		5	0	37	7
Comunicaciones	2017–18	Primera B Metropolitana	29	3	0	0	—		—		0	0	29	3
Comunicaciones	2018–19	Primera B Metropolitana	30	1	0	0	—		—		0	0	30	1
Comunicaciones	Total		197	26	3	0	—		—		5	0	205	26
Career total			307	32	3	0	—		—		7	0	317	32

== Honours ==
Comunicaciones

- Primera C Metropolitana: 2004–05
