= Sebastián Silguero =

Argentine footballer

Personal information
- Full name: Sebastián Ariel Silguero
- Date of birth: 1 January 1992 (age 34)
- Place of birth: Formosa, Argentina
- Height: 1.80 m (5 ft 11 in)
- Position: Defender

Team information
- Current team: Colegiales

Youth career
- River Plate

Senior career*
Years	Team	Apps	(Gls)
2012–2013	River Plate	0	(0)
2013–2015	Tigre	1	(0)
2016	Barracas Central	3	(0)
2017–2019	Comunicaciones	56	(1)
2019–2020	Fénix	21	(2)
2020–2021	Deportivo Armenio	27	(1)
2022	JJ Urquiza	16	(1)
2023	Acassuso	34	(3)
2024–	Colegiales	19	(2)
- * Club domestic league appearances and goals as of 17:41, 22 July 2025 (UTC)

Sebastián Ariel Silguero (born 1 January 1992) is an Argentine professional footballer who plays as a defender for Colegiales.

== Career ==
Silguero played in the youth system of River Plate, notably featuring at the 2012 U-20 Copa Libertadores in Peru; which the club won. Having been an unused substitute for Primera División fixtures with Lanús and San Martín in December 2012, Silguero made his senior debut in the succeeding April during a Copa Argentina defeat to Estudiantes. In July 2013, Tigre signed Silguero. He remained for three seasons but made only one appearance - vs. Arsenal de Sarandí in October 2014. A move to Barracas Central was completed in 2016, prior to him joining Comunicaciones. His first senior goal came in July 2017 versus Estudiantes.

== Career statistics ==
As of 11 May 2019.

Appearances and goals by club, season and competition
Club	Season	League			Cup		League Cup		Continental		Other		Total	
Club	Season	Division	Apps	Goals	Apps	Goals	Apps	Goals	Apps	Goals	Apps	Goals	Apps	Goals
River Plate	2012–13	Primera División	0	0	1	0	—		—		0	0	1	0
Tigre	2013–14	Primera División	0	0	0	0	—		—		0	0	0	0
Tigre	2014	Primera División	1	0	0	0	—		—		0	0	1	0
Tigre	2015	Primera División	0	0	0	0	—		—		0	0	0	0
Tigre	Total		1	0	0	0	—		—		0	0	1	0
Barracas Central	2016	Primera B Metropolitana	3	0	0	0	—		—		0	0	3	0
Barracas Central	2016–17	Primera B Metropolitana	0	0	0	0	—		—		0	0	0	0
Barracas Central	Total		3	0	0	0	—		—		0	0	3	0
Comunicaciones	2016–17	Primera B Metropolitana	10	0	0	0	—		—		5 (Note: Appearance(s) in the Primera B Metropolitana play-offs)	1	15	1
Comunicaciones	2017–18	Primera B Metropolitana	31	0	0	0	—		—		0	0	31	0
Comunicaciones	2018–19	Primera B Metropolitana	10	1	0	0	—		—		0	0	10	1
Comunicaciones	Total		51	1	0	0	—		—		5	1	56	2
Career total			55	1	1	0	—		—		5	1	61	2

== Honours ==
River Plate

- U-20 Copa Libertadores: 2012
