= Rodrigo Lastra =

Argentine professional footballer

Personal information
- Full name: Rodrigo Raúl Lastra
- Date of birth: 24 June 1998 (age 28)
- Place of birth: Santiago del Estero, Argentina
- Position: Midfielder

Team information
- Current team: Comunicaciones

Senior career*
Years	Team	Apps	(Gls)
2014–2016	Central Córdoba	0	(0)
2016–2018	Defensa y Justicia	0	(0)
2018–	Comunicaciones	9	(0)
- * Club domestic league appearances and goals as of 02:25, 12 May 2019 (UTC)

Rodrigo Raúl Lastra (born 24 June 1998) is an Argentine professional footballer who plays as a midfielder for Comunicaciones.

== Career ==
Lastra's career began with Central Córdoba, a club he made his senior bow for in October 2014 during a Copa Argentina loss to city rivals Mitre. From 2016, Lastra played for Primera División outfit Defensa y Justicia's reserves. On 30 June 2018, Lastra departed to join Comunicaciones of Primera B Metropolitana. He didn't feature in the first part of 2018–19, with his professional league bow eventually arriving in a victory on the road against UAI Urquiza in February 2019.

== Career statistics ==
As of 12 May 2019.

Appearances and goals by club, season and competition
Club	Season	League			Cup		League Cup		Continental		Other		Total	
Club	Season	Division	Apps	Goals	Apps	Goals	Apps	Goals	Apps	Goals	Apps	Goals	Apps	Goals
Central Córdoba	2014	Torneo Federal A	0	0	1	0	—		—		0	0	1	0
Central Córdoba	2015	Primera B Nacional	0	0	0	0	—		—		0	0	0	0
Central Córdoba	2016	Primera B Nacional	0	0	0	0	—		—		0	0	0	0
Central Córdoba	Total		0	0	1	0	—		—		0	0	1	0
Defensa y Justicia	2016–17	Primera División	0	0	0	0	—		0	0	0	0	0	0
Defensa y Justicia	2017–18	Primera División	0	0	0	0	—		0	0	0	0	0	0
Defensa y Justicia	Total		0	0	0	0	—		0	0	0	0	0	0
Comunicaciones	2018–19	Primera B Metropolitana	9	0	0	0	—		—		0	0	9	0
Career total			9	0	1	0	—		0	0	0	0	10	0
