= Gonzalo Yordan =

Argentine footballer

Personal information
- Full name: Gonzalo Javier Yordan
- Date of birth: 20 March 1994 (age 32)
- Place of birth: Morteros, Argentina
- Height: 1.85 m (6 ft 1 in)
- Position: Goalkeeper

Team information
- Current team: Club Comunicaciones

Youth career
- Vélez Sarsfield

Senior career*
Years	Team	Apps	(Gls)
2014–2018	Vélez Sarsfield	1	(0)
2018–2021	UAI Urquiza	7	(0)
2021	Estudiantes BA	0	(0)
2022–	Ferro de General Pico	29	(0)
→ 2023–	Club Comunicaciones	0	(0)
- * Club domestic league appearances and goals as of 17:53, 17 July 2022 (UTC)

Gonzalo Javier Yordan (born 20 March 1994) is an Argentine footballer who plays for Club Comunicaciones.
