= Guillermo Pfund =

Argentine professional footballer

Personal information
- Full name: Guillermo Nicolás Pfund
- Date of birth: 30 May 1989 (age 37)
- Place of birth: Tornquist, Argentina
- Height: 1.85 m (6 ft 1 in)
- Position: Centre-back

Youth career
- Unión de Tornquist
- 2003–2004: Boca Juniors
- 2004–2010: Vélez Sarsfield

Senior career*
| Years | Team | Apps | (Gls) |
| 2010–2013 | Vélez Sarsfield | 0 | (0) |
| 2010 | → Deportivo Merlo (loan) | 8 | (0) |
| 2011 | → Cienciano (loan) | 0 | (0) |
| 2011–2012 | → Bellinzona (loan) | 9 | (0) |
| 2012–2013 | → Deportivo Merlo (loan) | 22 | (0) |
| 2014 | Luis Ángel Firpo | 5 | (0) |
| 2014–2017 | Brown | 91 | (5) |
| 2017–2018 | Barracas Central | 15 | (0) |
| 2018–2019 | Comunicaciones | 31 | (2) |
| 2019–2020 | Olimpo | 5 | (0) |
| 2021 | Sportivo Peñarol | 22 | (0) |
| 2022–2023 | Sportivo Desamparados | 28 | (0) |
| 2023 | Círculo Deportivo | 7 | (0) |
- * Club domestic league appearances and goals as of 21:02, 17 March 2024 (UTC)

Guillermo Nicolás Pfund (born 30 May 1989) is an Argentine professional footballer who plays as a centre-back.

== Career ==
Pfund began in the youth of Unión de Tornquist, Boca Juniors and Vélez Sarsfield. In 2010, Deportivo Merlo of Primera B Nacional loaned Pfund. He was sent off on both his debut versus San Martín in February and his final appearance versus Boca Unidos in May. June 2011 saw Pfund join Peru's Cienciano on loan, though he'd return to Vélez Sarsfield months later to subsequently be loaned out to Swiss Challenge League side Bellinzona. He appeared nine times in tier two, six of which were as a starter for them. A second loan with Deportivo Merlo was completed on 17 July 2012. Twenty-three appearances came.

Pfund completed a move to Luis Ángel Firpo of the Primera División El Salvador in 2014. He made appearances in fixtures with Santa Tecla, Isidro Metapán, Atlético Marte, UES and Dragón as they were relegated. Brown became Pfund's sixth senior club in mid-2014. His first goal arrived in his second season versus Deportivo Español in March 2015, which was one of three in a campaign which concluded with promotion. In total, Pfund scored five in ninety-four in three years. After spending 2017–18 with Barracas Central, where he received his seventh career red card, Pfund signed for Comunicaciones in July 2018.

== Career statistics ==
As of 11 May 2019.

Appearances and goals by club, season and competition
| Club | Season | League | | | Cup | | League Cup | | Continental | | Other | | Total | |
| Club | Season | Division | Apps | Goals | Apps | Goals | Apps | Goals | Apps | Goals | Apps | Goals | Apps | Goals |
|---|---|---|---|---|---|---|---|---|---|---|---|---|---|---|
| Vélez Sarsfield | 2009–10 | Argentine Primera División | 0 | 0 | 0 | 0 | — | | 0 | 0 | 0 | 0 | 0 | 0 |
| Vélez Sarsfield | 2010–11 | Argentine Primera División | 0 | 0 | 0 | 0 | — | | 0 | 0 | 0 | 0 | 0 | 0 |
| Vélez Sarsfield | 2011–12 | Argentine Primera División | 0 | 0 | 0 | 0 | — | | 0 | 0 | 0 | 0 | 0 | 0 |
| Vélez Sarsfield | 2012–13 | Argentine Primera División | 0 | 0 | 0 | 0 | — | | 0 | 0 | 0 | 0 | 0 | 0 |
| Vélez Sarsfield | 2013–14 | Argentine Primera División | 0 | 0 | 0 | 0 | — | | 0 | 0 | 0 | 0 | 0 | 0 |
| Vélez Sarsfield | Total | | 0 | 0 | 0 | 0 | — | | 0 | 0 | 0 | 0 | 0 | 0 |
| Deportivo Merlo (loan) | 2009–10 | Primera B Nacional | 8 | 0 | 0 | 0 | — | | — | | 0 | 0 | 8 | 0 |
| Cienciano (loan) | 2011 | Peruvian Primera División | 0 | 0 | — | | — | | — | | 0 | 0 | 0 | 0 |
| Bellinzona (loan) | 2011–12 | Challenge League | 9 | 0 | 0 | 0 | — | | — | | 0 | 0 | 9 | 0 |
| Deportivo Merlo (loan) | 2012–13 | Primera B Nacional | 22 | 0 | 1 | 0 | — | | — | | 0 | 0 | 23 | 0 |
| Luis Ángel Firpo | 2013–14 | Primera División El Salvador | 5 | 0 | — | | — | | 0 | 0 | 0 | 0 | 5 | 0 |
| Brown | 2014 | Primera B Metropolitana | 9 | 0 | 0 | 0 | — | | — | | 0 | 0 | 9 | 0 |
| Brown | 2015 | Primera B Metropolitana | 33 | 3 | 1 | 0 | — | | — | | 0 | 0 | 34 | 3 |
| Brown | 2016 | Primera B Nacional | 15 | 0 | 0 | 0 | — | | — | | 0 | 0 | 15 | 0 |
| Brown | 2016–17 | Primera B Nacional | 34 | 2 | 2 | 0 | — | | — | | 0 | 0 | 36 | 2 |
| Brown | Total | | 91 | 5 | 3 | 0 | — | | — | | 0 | 0 | 94 | 5 |
| Barracas Central | 2017–18 | Primera B Metropolitana | 15 | 0 | 0 | 0 | — | | — | | 0 | 0 | 15 | 0 |
| Comunicaciones | 2018–19 | Primera B Metropolitana | 30 | 2 | 0 | 0 | — | | — | | 0 | 0 | 30 | 2 |
| Career total | | | 180 | 7 | 4 | 0 | — | | 0 | 0 | 0 | 0 | 184 | 7 |

== Honours ==
Brown

- Primera B Metropolitana: 2015
