= Agustín Cattaneo =

Argentine footballer

Personal information
- Full name: Agustín Cattaneo
- Date of birth: 15 August 1988 (age 38)
- Place of birth: Buenos Aires, Argentina
- Height: 1.83 m (6 ft 0 in)
- Position: Centre-back

Senior career*
Years	Team	Apps	(Gls)
2008–2009	Tigre	0	(0)
2009	Almagro	1	(0)
2010	Figueirense		
2011–2012	Huracán de Tres Arroyos	19	(1)
2012–2014	Deportivo Armenio	61	(5)
2014	Platense	3	(0)
2015–2018	Comunicaciones	114	(6)
2018–2019	Olimpo	7	(0)
2019–2021	Tristán Suárez	12	(0)
2022	Comunicaciones	15	(1)
2022–2023	Persita Tangerang	16	(1)
2023	Deportivo Español	0	(0)
- * Club domestic league appearances and goals as of 22 January 2023

Agustín Cattaneo (born 28 August 1988) is an Argentine professional footballer who plays as a centre-back.
