= Fernando Maldonado (footballer) =

Argentine professional footballer

Personal information
- Full name: Fernando Ariel Maldonado
- Date of birth: 25 May 1992 (age 34)
- Place of birth: Argentina
- Position: Forward

Team information
- Current team: Atlas

Senior career*
Years	Team	Apps	(Gls)
2012–2018	Argentino de Merlo	109	(24)
2013–2014	→ Muñiz (loan)	32	(7)
2018–2019	Comunicaciones	6	(0)
2019	Argentino de Merlo	8	(0)
2020	Boston River	0	(0)
2021–	Atlas	43	(2)
- * Club domestic league appearances and goals as of 17:22, 4 September 2022 (UTC)

Fernando Ariel Maldonado (born 25 May 1992) is an Argentine professional footballer who plays as a forward.

== Career ==
Maldonado's career started with Argentino. He appeared in the 2012–13 Primera C Metropolitana for the club, though would subsequently spend 2013–14 in Primera D Metropolitana on loan with Muñiz. Seven goals in thirty-two appearances followed. Maldonado returned to Argentino in 2014, remaining for five further seasons in the fourth tier to take his overall tally to one hundred and nine matches and twenty-four goals; with his penultimate season ending with relegation. On 30 June 2018, Maldonado joined Comunicaciones of Primera B Metropolitana. He made his debut against Deportivo Riestra on 18 August.

== Career statistics ==
As of 13 May 2019.

Appearances and goals by club, season and competition
Club	Season	League			Cup		League Cup		Continental		Other		Total	
Club	Season	Division	Apps	Goals	Apps	Goals	Apps	Goals	Apps	Goals	Apps	Goals	Apps	Goals
Argentino	2013–14	Primera C Metropolitana	0	0	0	0	—		—		0	0	0	0
Argentino	2017–18	Primera D Metropolitana	30	14	0	0	—		—		0	0	30	14
Argentino	Total		30	14	0	0	—		—		0	0	30	14
Muñiz (loan)	2013–14	Primera D Metropolitana	32	7	1	1	—		—		0	0	33	8
Comunicaciones	2018–19	Primera B Metropolitana	6	0	0	0	—		—		0	0	6	0
Career total			68	21	1	1	—		—		0	0	69	22
