= Rafael Melo =

Uruguayan footballer (born 2000)

Personal information
- Full name: Rafael Lucas Melo Chauvie
- Date of birth: 19 March 2000 (age 26)
- Place of birth: Juan Lacaze, Uruguay
- Height: 1.77 m (5 ft 10 in)
- Position: Right winger

Youth career
- Nacional

Senior career*
Years	Team	Apps	(Gls)
2019	Progreso	4	(0)
2020	Villa Española	14	(1)
2021	Racing Montevideo	9	(1)
2022	Club Artigas		
- * Club domestic league appearances and goals as of 08:29, 24 December 2021 (UTC)

Rafael Lucas Melo Chauvie (born 19 March 2000) is a Uruguayan footballer who plays as a right winger.

== Career ==
=== Club career ===
After playing his youth years at Nacional, Melo moved to C.A. Progreso in January 2019. On 20 April 2019, Melo got his official debut for Progreso and professional debut, when he came in as a substitute for Alexander Rosso in the 86th minute against River Plate in the Uruguayan Primera División. Melo played a total of four league games for Progreso in the 2019 season.

Melo moved to Uruguayan Segunda División club Villa Española for the 2020 season. In his first season at the club, Melo made 14 league appearances and scored one goal. In 2021, Melo moved to Racing Club de Montevideo.

On 10 April 2022, Melo joined Uruguayan club Club Artigas until the end of the year.
