= Juan Bautista Arricau =

Argentine professional footballer

Personal information
- Date of birth: 1 April 1998 (age 28)
- Place of birth: Pilar, Argentina
- Position: Forward

Team information
- Current team: Comunicaciones

Youth career
- 2012–2019: Vélez Sarsfield

Senior career*
Years	Team	Apps	(Gls)
2019–	Comunicaciones	8	(0)

International career
2014	Argentina U17		
- * Club domestic league appearances and goals as of 00:30, 13 May 2019 (UTC)

Juan Bautista Arricau (born 1 April 1998) is an Argentine professional footballer who plays as a forward for Comunicaciones.

== Club career ==
Arricau is a product of Vélez Sarsfield's youth ranks, having joined in 2012. He started his senior career in Primera B Metropolitana with Comunicaciones, signing in February 2019. He made his bow in an away fixture with UAI Urquiza, featuring for the full duration of a 0–1 win on 11 February; Walter Zermatten selected him in three others matches that month.

== International career ==
Arricau received call-ups to the Argentina U17s during his youth career, notably featuring in a friendly with Chile U17 on 26 July 2014.

== Career statistics ==
As of 13 May 2019.

Appearances and goals by club, season and competition
Club	Season	League			Cup		League Cup		Continental		Other		Total	
Club	Season	Division	Apps	Goals	Apps	Goals	Apps	Goals	Apps	Goals	Apps	Goals	Apps	Goals
Comunicaciones	2018–19	Primera B Metropolitana	8	0	0	0	—		—		0	0	8	0
Career total			8	0	0	0	—		—		0	0	8	0
