= Martín Minadevino =

Argentine footballer

Personal information
- Full name: Martín Hernán Minadevino
- Date of birth: August 17, 1983 (age 43)
- Place of birth: Mercedes, Argentina
- Height: 1.78 m (5 ft 10 in)
- Position: Midfielder

Team information
- Current team: Central Córdoba (SdE)

Senior career*
Years	Team	Apps	(Gls)
2008–2009	Defensores de Belgrano	?	(4)
2010–2013	Atlético Brown	35	(22)
2013	Once Caldas	7	(1)
2013–2014	Atlético Temperley	10	(2)
2014–2015	Blooming	33	(2)
2015–	Central Córdoba (SdE)	2	(0)
- * Club domestic league appearances and goals

Martín Hernán Minadevino (born August 17, 1983, in Mercedes, Argentina) is an Argentinian footballer who since 2015 has played midfielder for Central Córdoba de Santiago del Estero.

Since his debut season in 2008 Minadevino has played for five clubs in 3 countries. Clubs he played for include Defensores de Belgrano, Atlético Brown and Atlético Temperley in his native country, Once Caldas in Colombia and Blooming from Bolivia.

== Club career statistics ==
Club performance			League		Cup		League Cup		Total	
Season	Club	League	Apps	Goals	Apps	Goals	Apps	Goals	Apps	Goals
League		League Cup			Domestic Cup		Total			
2008/09	Defensores de Belgrano	Primera B Metropolitana	?	4	-	-	-	-	?	4
2010/11	Atlético Brown	Primera B Metropolitana	?	1	-	-	-	-	?	1
2011/12	Atlético Brown	Primera B Metropolitana	?	10	-	-	-	-	?	10
2012/13	Atlético Brown	Primera B Metropolitana	33	11	2	0	-	-	35	11
2013	Once Caldas	Categoría Primera A	7	1	-	-	-	-	7	1
2013/14	Atlético Temperley	Primera B Metropolitana	10	2	-	-	-	-	10	2
2014/15	Club Blooming	Liga de Fútbol Profesional Boliviano	33	2	-	-	-	-	33	2
Total			83	31	2	0	-	-	85	31

== Achievements ==
2013/14 Primera B Metropolitana Runners-up
