= Marcelo Perugini =

Argentine footballer

Personal information
- Full name: Marcelo Fabián Perugini
- Date of birth: 17 January 1984 (age 42)
- Place of birth: Buenos Aires, Argentina
- Height: 1.83 m (6 ft 0 in)
- Position: Forward

Youth career
- Racing Club

Senior career*
Years	Team	Apps	(Gls)
2005–2006	Villa Mitre		
2006–2008	Olimpo		
2008–2009	San Martín Tucumán	11	(1)
2009	Villa Mitre		
2010	Gimnasia de Jujuy		
2011–2012	Pierikos	11	(0)
2012–2013	Defensores Belgrano	17	(0)
2013–2014	Sarmiento Resistencia		
2014–2015	Aurora	6	(1)
2015	Comunicaciones	2	(0)
2016	Sansinena	7	(0)
2016–2017	Deportivo Roca	12	(0)
- * Club domestic league appearances and goals

Marcelo Fabián Perugini (born 17 January 1984) is a retired Argentine football forward.

== Career ==
Born in Buenos Aires, Perugini began playing youth football for Racing Club de Avellaneda. He started playing senior football for Club Villa Mitre before joining Primera B side Club Olimpo. After helping Olimpo gain promotion to the Primera Division, he left for San Martín de Tucumán in July 2008.
