= Ariel Coronel (Argentine footballer) =

Argentine professional footballer

Personal information
- Full name: Ariel Elpidio Coronel
- Date of birth: 17 July 1987 (age 39)
- Place of birth: Villa Atamisqui, Argentina
- Height: 1.82 m (5 ft 11 1/2 in)
- Position: Centre-back

Team information
- Current team: Mitre

Youth career
- Nueva Chicago

Senior career*
Years	Team	Apps	(Gls)
2008–2014	Nueva Chicago	92	(2)
2014–2016	Comunicaciones	50	(0)
2016–2017	Villa Dálmine	37	(0)
2017–2018	Almagro	15	(0)
2018–2019	Mitre	21	(0)
2019	Atlanta	4	(0)
2020	Cobresal	17	(1)
2021	Deportes Iquique	17	(1)
2022–	Mitre	12	(1)
- * Club domestic league appearances and goals as of 19:42, 14 June 2022 (UTC)

Ariel Elpidio Coronel (born 17 July 1987) is an Argentine professional footballer who plays as a centre-back for Deportes Iquique.

== Career ==
Coronel started his career with Nueva Chicago in 2008. After three seasons in Primera B Metropolitana, which included sixty-four appearances and one goal, the team won promotion to Primera B Nacional for 2012–13. He scored his first goal in the second tier on 15 April 2013 against Banfield, in a campaign which ended with a return to Primera B Metropolitana. On 30 June 2014, after winning the 2013–14 with Nueva Chicago, Coronel joined Comunicaciones. He was selected fifty times by the club across the 2014, 2015 and 2016 seasons. Villa Dálmine won promotion in the latter, with the defender then joining them in Primera B Nacional.

In August 2017, Coronel completed a move to Almagro. Ten months later, Primera B Nacional's Mitre signed Coronel. He made his debut during a win away to Platense on 26 August. After a five-month stint with Atlanta to end 2019, Coronel headed abroad for the first time as he agreed terms with Chilean Primera División side Cobresal. His first appearance came in a 2–1 victory over Colo-Colo on 2 February 2020.

== Career statistics ==
As of 2 July 2020.

Club statistics
Club	Season	League			Cup		League Cup		Continental		Other		Total	
Club	Season	Division	Apps	Goals	Apps	Goals	Apps	Goals	Apps	Goals	Apps	Goals	Apps	Goals
Nueva Chicago	2012–13	Primera B Nacional	18	1	1	0	—		—		0	0	19	1
Nueva Chicago	2013–14	Primera B Metropolitana	10	0	0	0	—		—		0	0	10	0
Nueva Chicago	Total		28	1	1	0	—		—		0	0	29	1
Comunicaciones	2014	Primera B Metropolitana	16	0	1	0	—		—		0	0	17	0
Comunicaciones	2015	Primera B Metropolitana	28	0	3	0	—		—		0	0	31	0
Comunicaciones	2016	Primera B Metropolitana	6	0	0	0	—		—		0	0	6	0
Comunicaciones	Total		50	0	4	0	—		—		0	0	54	0
Villa Dálmine	2016–17	Primera B Nacional	37	0	0	0	—		—		0	0	37	0
Almagro	2017–18	Primera B Nacional	15	0	0	0	—		—		2 (Note: Appearance(s) in the Primera B Nacional play-offs)	0	17	0
Mitre	2018–19	Primera B Nacional	21	0	0	0	—		—		0	0	21	0
Atlanta	2019–20	Primera B Nacional	4	0	0	0	—		—		0	0	4	0
Cobresal	2020	Primera División	4	0	0	0	—		—		0	0	4	0
Career total			159	1	5	0	—		—		2	0	166	1

== Honours ==
Nueva Chicago

- Primera B Metropolitana: 2013–14
