= Daniel Monllor =

Argentine footballer

Personal information
- Full name: Arturo Daniel Monllor
- Date of birth: 20 July 1984 (age 42)
- Place of birth: Posadas, Argentina
- Height: 1.90 m (6 ft 3 in)
- Position: Goalkeeper

Team information
- Current team: Nueva Chicago

Youth career
- Nueva Chicago

Senior career*
Years	Team	Apps	(Gls)
2004−2014	Nueva Chicago	89	(0)
2014−2015	Boavista	4	(0)
2016	Deportivo Armenio	19	(0)
2016–2018	Talleres RE	0	(0)
2018–2019	Colegiales	36	(0)
2019–2020	Los Andes	14	(0)
2020–2021	Sacachispas	38	(0)
2022	Estudiantes BA	20	(0)
2023–	Nueva Chicago	36	(0)
- * Club domestic league appearances and goals as of 17:38, 8 June 2024 (UTC)

Arturo Daniel Monllor (born 20 July 1984) is an Argentine football goalkeeper who currently plays for Nueva Chicago.

== Career ==
Born in Posadas, Monllor started his career at Nueva Chicago in the Argentine second tier, adding up nearly 100 league appearances in the 10 seasons he spent there.

On 28 June 2014, Monllor moved abroad for the first time in his career, joining newly promoted Boavista in Portugal. He debuted on 17 August 2014, in a match against Braga, but only appeared sporadically throughout his first year, acting mainly as back-up to Mika. He terminated his contract with Boavista in July 2015, but only joined Deportivo Armenio in the Primera C in February 2016.
