= Daniel Franco (Argentine footballer) =

Argentine footballer

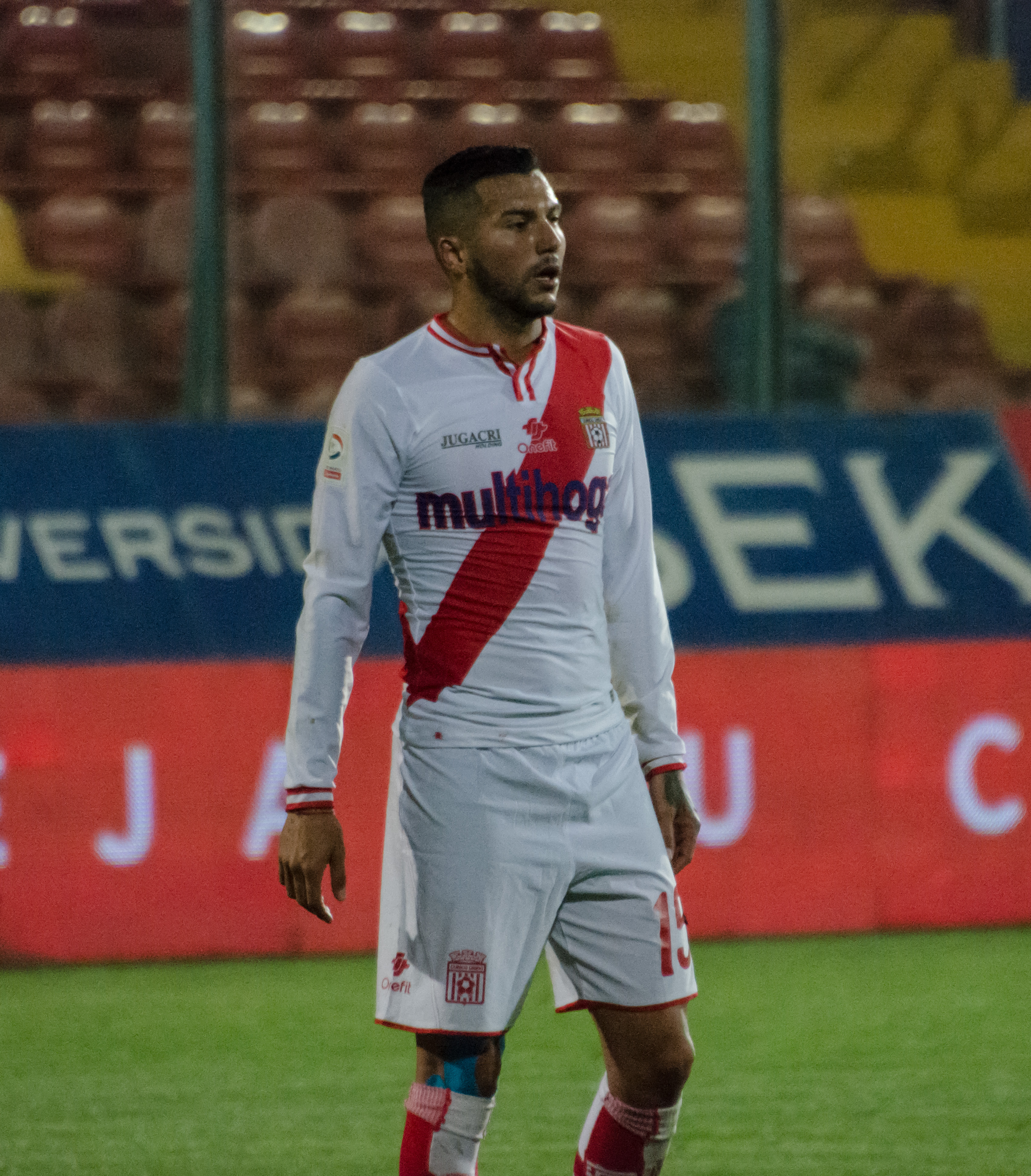

Personal information
- Full name: Daniel Alejandro Franco
- Date of birth: 15 July 1991 (age 35)
- Place of birth: Granadero Baigorria, Argentina
- Height: 1.84 m (6 ft 0 in)
- Position: Centre back

Team information
- Current team: Los Andes

Senior career*
Years	Team	Apps	(Gls)
2009–2012	Argentinos Juniors	0	(0)
2012–2013	→ Almagro (loan)	24	(3)
2013–2014	→ Los Andes (loan)	55	(2)
2015–2016	→ San Martín SJ (loan)	5	(0)
2017	Brown de Adrogué	18	(2)
2017	Sud América	13	(1)
2018–2019	Curicó Unido	40	(0)
2020–2021	Oriente Petrolero	44	(0)
2022–2026	Atlético Grau	115	(3)
2026–	Los Andes	10	(0)
- * Club domestic league appearances and goals as of 17:16, 29 April 2026 (UTC)

Daniel Alejandro Franco (born 15 July 1991) is an Argentine footballer who plays for Los Andes.
