= Federico Barrionuevo =

Argentine footballer

Personal information
- Date of birth: June 30, 1981 (age 45)
- Place of birth: Lanús, Buenos Aires, Argentina
- Height: 1.73 m (5 ft 8 in)
- Position: Midfielder

Team information
- Current team: Cúcuta Deportivo (caretaker)

Senior career*
Years	Team	Apps	(Gls)
2001–2005	Banfield	36	(1)
2002–2003	→ Deportivo Español (loan)	28	(5)
2004	→ All Boys (loan)	16	(10)
2006	Tigre	8	(0)
2006	Tiro Federal	17	(5)
2007–2009	Defensa y Justicia	45	(10)
2007	→ Platense (loan)	19	(2)
2008	Deportivo Cuenca	15	(1)
2009–2010	Olimpo	26	(3)
2010–2011	Cúcuta Deportivo	31	(3)
2011–2012	Atlético Tucumán	22	(4)
2012	Chacarita Juniors	10	(1)
2013–2015	Tristán Suárez	38	(10)
2015–2019	Club Comunicaciones	80	(13)
2017–2019	→ UAI Urquiza (loan)	60	(7)
Total		444	(74)

Managerial career
- 2023–: Cúcuta Deportivo (caretaker)
- * Club domestic league appearances and goals

Federico Barrionuevo (born June 30, 1981) is a former Argentine footballer and manager, who played for clubs in Ecuador and Colombia as well as spending the majority of his career in domestic football.

In August 2023, he was hired as Cúcuta Deportivo assistant coach. In September, he took over as technical director, due to the departure of Rubén Tanucci.
