= 2016–17 Primera B Metropolitana =

Primera B Metropolitana
- Season: 2016–17
- Dates: 26 Aug 2016 – 3 Aug 2017
- Champions: Deportivo Morón (2nd. title)
- Promoted: Deportivo Morón; Deportivo Riestra
- Relegated: Excursionistas
- 2016–17 Copa Argentina: Atlanta; Defensores de Belgrano; Deportivo Morón; Deportivo Riestra; Estudiantes (BA)
- Matches: 342
- Goals: 729 (2.13 per match)
- Top goalscorer: (Argentina) Juan Martín (22)

The 2016-17 Argentine Primera B Metropolitana was the 118th. season of Primera B Metropolitana, the third division of the Argentine football league system. The season began on 26 August 2016 and end on 3 August 2017. Nineteen teams competed in the league.

With four rounds remaining for the end of the season, Deportivo Morón won the championship and promoted to Primera Nacional. In that fixture, Morón defeated Platense 2–1, totalising 63 points.

Deportivo Riestra was the second team promoted after winning the "torneo reducido" defeating Comunicaciones 21 (on goal difference) in the finals. On the other hand, Excursionistas was relegated to Primera C Metropolitana.

== League table ==
| Pos | Team | Pld | W | D | L | GF | GA | GD | Pts | Promotion or Qualification |
|---|---|---|---|---|---|---|---|---|---|---|
| 1 | Deportivo Morón (C) | 36 | 17 | 15 | 4 | 47 | 22 | +25 | 66 | Promotion to Primera B Nacional |
| 2 | Deportivo Riestra | 36 | 16 | 10 | 10 | 53 | 37 | +16 | 58 | Qualification to Primera B Nacional play-off |
| 3 | Atlanta | 36 | 15 | 12 | 9 | 45 | 33 | +12 | 57 | Qualification to Primera B Nacional play-off |
| 4 | Comunicaciones | 36 | 15 | 10 | 11 | 45 | 33 | +12 | 55 | Qualification to Primera B Nacional play-off |
| 5 | Defensores de Belgrano | 36 | 14 | 12 | 10 | 32 | 28 | +4 | 54 | Qualification to Primera B Nacional play-off |
| 6 | Estudiantes | 36 | 14 | 12 | 10 | 42 | 38 | +4 | 54 | Qualification to Primera B Nacional play-off |
| 7 | Barracas Central | 36 | 13 | 12 | 11 | 50 | 40 | +10 | 51 | Qualification to Primera B Nacional play-off |
| 8 | Deportivo Español | 36 | 14 | 9 | 13 | 38 | 33 | +5 | 51 | Qualification to Primera B Nacional play-off |
| 9 | Platense | 36 | 13 | 12 | 11 | 32 | 30 | +2 | 51 | Qualification to Primera B Nacional play-off |
| 10 | Almirante Brown | 36 | 13 | 12 | 11 | 30 | 38 | −8 | 51 | |
| 11 | San Telmo | 36 | 14 | 7 | 15 | 42 | 38 | +4 | 49 | |
| 12 | UAI Urquiza | 36 | 13 | 9 | 14 | 33 | 39 | −6 | 48 | |
| 13 | Fénix | 36 | 10 | 16 | 10 | 40 | 37 | +3 | 46 | |
| 14 | Tristán Suárez | 36 | 10 | 11 | 15 | 31 | 47 | −16 | 41 | |
| 15 | Acassuso | 36 | 6 | 22 | 8 | 36 | 35 | +1 | 40 | |
| 16 | Talleres | 36 | 11 | 7 | 18 | 43 | 52 | −9 | 40 | |
| 17 | Colegiales | 36 | 9 | 10 | 17 | 32 | 48 | −16 | 37 | |
| 18 | Villa San Carlos | 36 | 8 | 12 | 16 | 26 | 41 | −15 | 36 | |
| 19 | Excursionistas | 36 | 6 | 13 | 17 | 32 | 60 | −28 | 31 | Relegation to Primera C |

Updated to match(es) played on 6 June 2016. Source: Soccerway
Rules for classification: 1) points; 2) play-off (only for deciding promotion or relegation); 3) goal difference; 4) goals scored; 5) head-to-head points; 6) head-to-head goal difference; 7) head-to-head goals scored. (C) Champion; (R) Relegated.

Deportivo Morón is the champion of the 2016–17 Primera B Metropolitana at 34th week.

== Torneo reducido ==
The winner was the 2nd. team promoted to Primera Nacional.

=== Quarterfinals ===
Played as a single-elimination tournament:

| Home team | Score | Away team |
|---|---|---|
| Deportivo Riestra | 0–0 | Platense |
| Atlanta | 0–1 | Deportivo Español |
| Comunicaciones | 1–1 | Barracas Central |
| Defensores de Belgrano | 0–1 | Estudiantes (BA) |

=== Semifinals ===
| Team 1 | Agg. | Team 2 | 1st leg | 2nd leg |
|---|---|---|---|---|
| Deportivo Riestra | 2–1 | Deportivo Español | 2–0 | 0–1 |
| Estudiantes de Buenos Aires | 2–3 | Comunicaciones | 1–1 | 1–2 |

=== Finals ===
Torneo Reducido finals
(2nd. promotion playoff)
23 July 2017
First leg

| Comunicaciones | 1–0 | Deportivo Riestra |
|---|---|---|
| Rose 63' | Report |

Estadio Nueva España, Buenos Aires
Attendance: 0 (Note: No spectators were allowed for the match.)
Referee: Américo Monsalvo

30 July 2017
Second leg

| Deportivo Riestra | 2–0 | Comunicaciones |
|---|---|---|
| Benítez 12'; Ortiz 33' | Report |

Estadio Guillermo Laza, Buenos Aires
Attendance: 2,100
Referee: Paulo Vigliano

Team details

Deportivo Riestra
Comunicaciones

| GK | (Argentina) Carlos Morel |
| DF | (Argentina) Jorge Visintini | (substituted off) 35' |
| DF | (Argentina) Daniel Silvani |
| DF | (Argentina) Gustavo Benítez |
| DF | (Argentina) Roberto Bochi |
| MF | (Argentina) Sebastián O. López |
| MF | (Argentina) Mauricio Soto |
| MF | (Argentina) Sebastián E. Soto | (substituted off) 73' |
| FW | (Argentina) Mauro Ortiz |
| FW | (Argentina) Nahuel Benítez |
| FW | (Argentina) Gonzalo Bravo | (substituted off) 81' |
Substitutions:
| DF | (Argentina) Gastón Montero | (substituted on) 35' |
| MF | (Argentina) Jonathan Goya | (substituted on) 73' |
| DF | (Argentina) Sebastián Lamacchia | (substituted on) 81' |
Manager:
(Argentina) Jorge G. Benítez

| GK | (Argentina) Germán Yacaruso |
| DF | (Argentina) Sebastián Silguero |
| DF | (Argentina) Agustín Cattaneo |
| DF | (Argentina) Lucas Banegas | (substituted off) 79' |
| DF | (Argentina) Sebastián Corda |
| MF | (Argentina) Nicolás E. Varela |
| MF | (Argentina) Rodrigo Melo |
| MF | (Argentina) Luis Soria | (substituted off) 70' |
| MF | (Argentina) Tomás Asprea |
| FW | (Argentina) Hernán Salazar |
| FW | (Argentina) Maximiliano Zárate | (substituted off) 74' |
Substitutions:
| MF | (Argentina) Federico Barrionuevo | (substituted on) 70' |
| FW | (Argentina) Lucas Rodríguez | (substituted on) 74' |
| FW | (Argentina) Martín Blanco | (substituted on) 79' |
Manager:
(Uruguay) Alejandro Orfila

Deportivo Riestra won 2–1 on aggregate, promoting to Primera Nacional.

== See also ==
- 2016–17 Argentine Primera División
- 2016–17 Primera B Nacional
- 2016–17 Torneo Federal A
- 2016–17 Copa Argentina
