= Estadio Alfredo Ramos =

Football stadium in Buenos Aires, Argentina

Coordinates: 34°35′37.40″S 58°29′18.70″W

Alfredo Ramos Stadium
- Estadio Alfredo Ramos
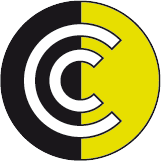
- Interactive map of Alfredo Ramos Stadium
- Address: Av. San Martín 5125; Buenos Aires; Argentina
- Owner: Club Comunicaciones
- Capacity: 3,500
- Type: Stadium
- Surface: Grass
- Field size: 105 x 70 m

Construction
- Opened: September 29, 1962; 63 years ago
- Renovated: 2020

Tenant
- Comunicaciones

Estadio Alfredo Ramos is a football stadium located in the Agronomía neighborhood of Buenos Aires, Argentina. It is owned and operated by Club Comunicaciones. The stadium holds 3,500 people and was opened on 29 September 1962. Its name is a heartfelt tribute to Alfredo Ramos, who was president of the Club for 14 years.

Starting in 2020, the stadium was refurbished. Works consisted in replacing the stalls seats, and the installation of a watering system. They were completed in 2022.
