= Club Atlético San Telmo =

San Telmo
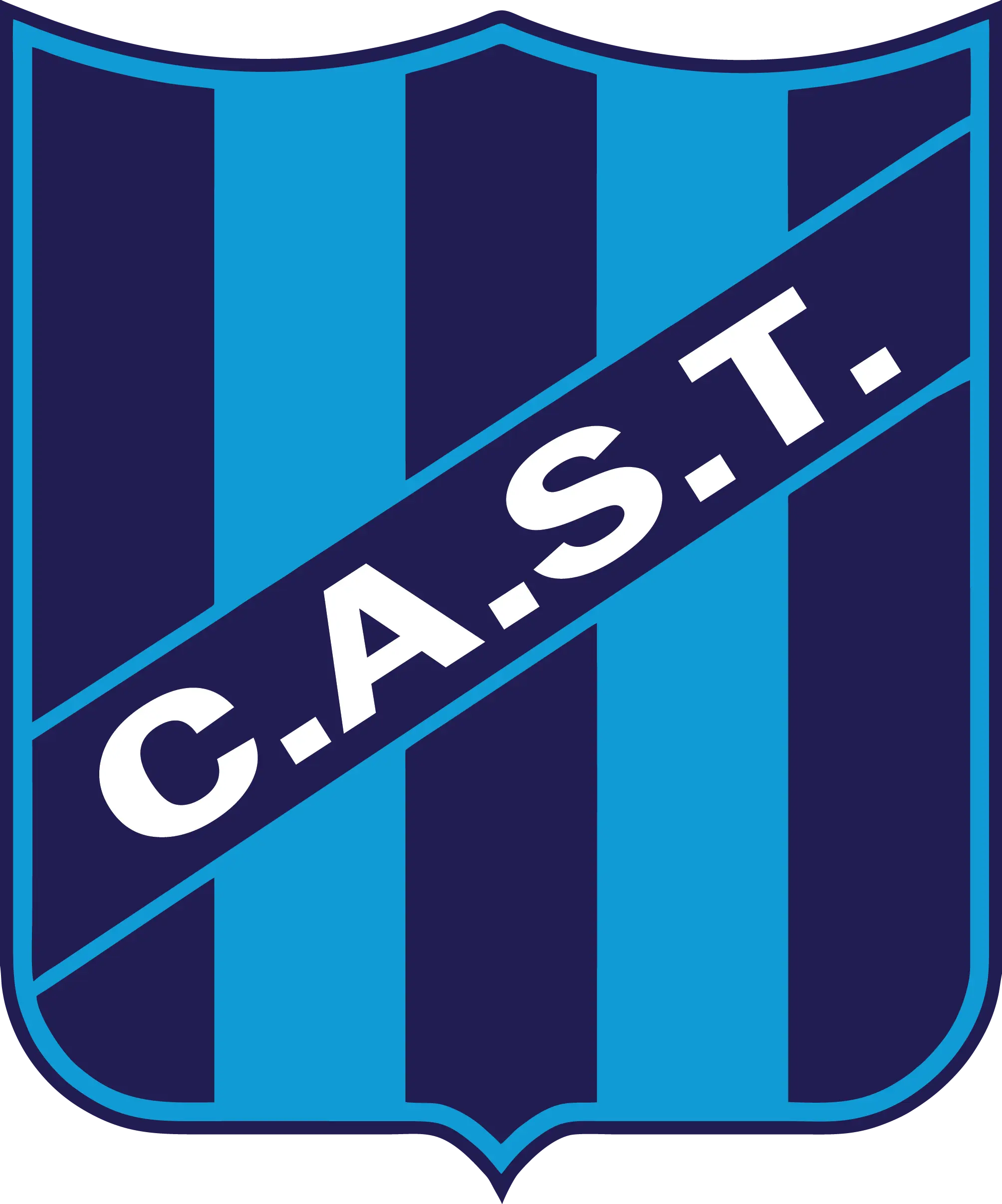
- Full name: Club Atlético San Telmo
- Nickname: Candombero
- Founded: 5 March 1904; 122 years ago
- Ground: Estadio Osvaldo Baletto, Dock Sud
- Capacity: 2,000
- Chairman: Fernando Leiro
- Manager: Aníbal Biggeri
- League: Primera Nacional
- 2025: 12th. of Zona B
- Website: clubsantelmo.com.ar
Home colours	Away colours	Third colours

Club Atlético San Telmo is an Argentine sports club located in the neighbourhood of San Telmo, in the City of Buenos Aires. The club is mostly known for its football team, which currently plays in Primera Nacional, the second division of the Argentine football league system.

Apart from football, other sports practised at San Telmo are basketball, boxing, field hockey, futsal, handball, martial arts, and artistic roller skating.

== History ==
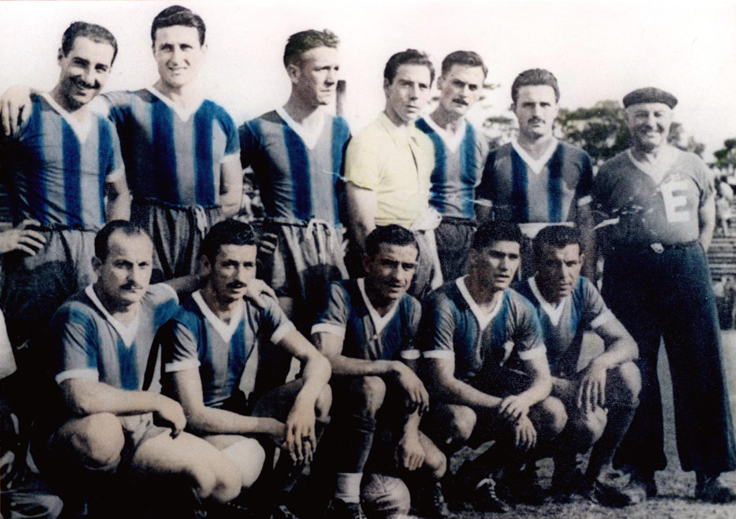
The 1949 squad that won the first title for the club although it was not promoted to Primera.

The club was founded as "San Telmo Football Club" on March 5, 1904, by Francisco Pantarotto who would be also its first president. The first headquarters were located on Paseo Colón Avenue of Buenos Aires. San Telmo had several venues located in Puerto Madero until the club built its first stadium on Juan de Garay street in San Telmo district where the club took its name from.

The first jerseys were blue and white. In the first official match of the club, the rain made the colour blue to fade until it covered the white part of the jerseys in a light-blue tone. From then on, the club adopted the blue and light blue as its official colors.

In 1916 the team affiliated to Argentine Football Association and won the Segunda División de Ascenso tournament. In the 1920s the club changed its team to "Club Atlético San Telmo" which has remained to date. In 1926 and due to the lack of a deed of sale, San Telmo had to move to Isla Maciel in Dock Sud district of Greater Buenos Aires. The club inaugurated its own stadium there three years later. The first title won by San Telmo was 1949 Primera C but due to a restructuring of the Argentine league system, the squad did not promote to the upper division.

In 1975 San Telmo finished third in Primera B, therefore the team qualified to play the playoffs to promote to Primera División, which finally achieved. Although being promoted to the first division, San Telmo would be relegated in the next season. Nevertheless, the team that played in the top level during 1976 wrote a memorable page in the history of the club on May 25, 1976 when it defeated Boca Juniors by 3–1 at Huracán's stadium.

== Stadium ==
San Telmo's stadium is named Dr. Osvaldo Baletto and is located in the Isla Maciel of Dock Sud, Avellaneda Partido. It was closed from February 11, 2006 due to violent incidents in a match against Talleres (BA), which caused San Telmo to play its home games at the Estadio Alfredo Ramos, Club Comunicaciones's venue.

In October, 2011, and after six year of being closed, the stadium was reopened to host the match between the local team and Almagro which ended 0–0.

== Players ==
=== Current squad ===
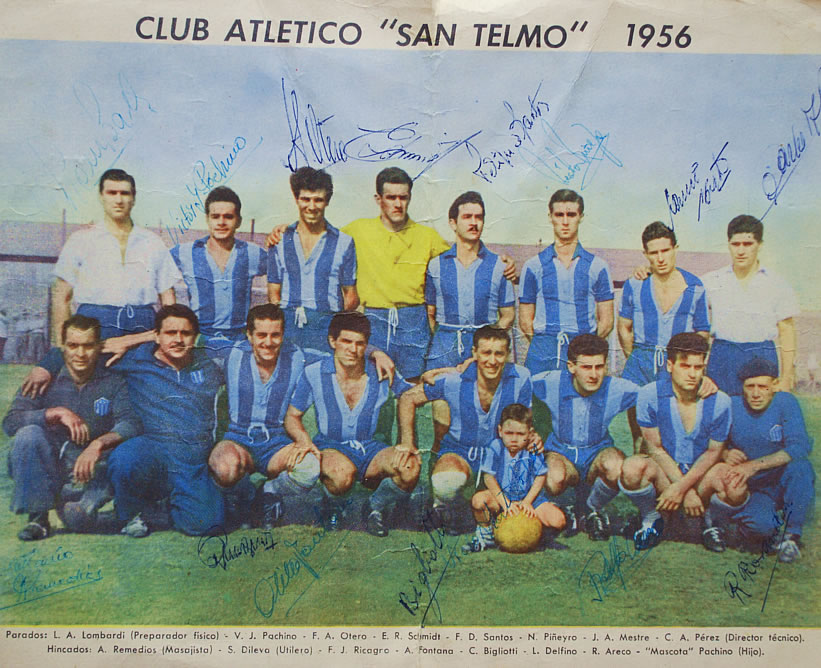
The 1956 team won the second title for the club.

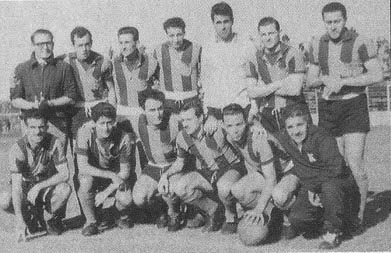
The 1961 squad achieved the third championship.

As of 31 July 2022. Note: Flags indicate national team as defined under FIFA eligibility rules; some limited exceptions apply. Players may hold more than one non-FIFA nationality.

No.	Pos.	Nation	Player
—	GK	ARG	Tomás Sultani
—	GK	ARG	Luis Ardente
—	DF	ARG	Leandro Hertel
—	DF	ARG	Juan Pablo Tomicich (on loan from Defensa)
—	DF	ARG	Robertino Canavesio
—	DF	ARG	Ángel Villagra
—	DF	ARG	Jonathan Paiz
—	DF	ARG	Aaron Barquett (on loan from Argentinos)
—	MF	ARG	Juan Manuel Requena
—	MF	ARG	Damián Toledo
—	MF	ARG	Alexander Zurita
—	MF	ARG	Ramiro López
—	MF	ARG	Ramiro Luna (on loan from Ferrocarril)
—	MF	ARG	Santiago Nagüel

No.	Pos.	Nation	Player
—	MF	ARG	Cristian Medina
—	MF	ARG	Agustín Graneros
—	MF	ARG	Lionel Laborda
—	FW	ARG	Esteban Rueda
—	FW	ARG	Lucas Melgarejo
—	FW	ARG	Rodrigo González
—	FW	ARG	Gianluca Pugliese (on loan from Platense)
—	FW	ARG	Ricardo Ramírez
—	FW	ARG	Jonathan Cañete
—	FW	ARG	Leandro Rodríguez
—	FW	ARG	Juan Cruz Zurbriggen (on loan from Colón)
—	FW	ARG	Horacio Martínez
—	FW	ARG	Marcos Landáburu

=== Out on loan ===
Note: Flags indicate national team as defined under FIFA eligibility rules; some limited exceptions apply. Players may hold more than one non-FIFA nationality.

No.	Pos.	Nation	Player
—	GK	ARG	Alan González (at San Miguel until 31 December 2022)
—	DF	ARG	Lucas Arce (at Gimnasia Mendoza until 31 December 2022)

No.	Pos.	Nation	Player
—	DF	ARG	Franco Quiroz (at San Martín de Tucumán until 31 December 2022)

== Honours ==
- Primera C
  - Champions (4): 1949, 1956, 1961, 2015
