= Club Comunicaciones =

Argentine sports club

Comunicaciones
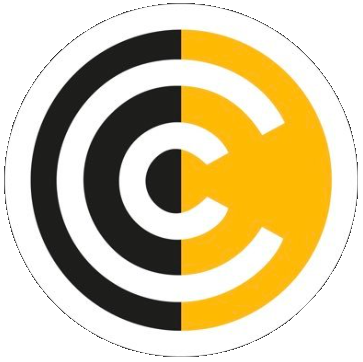
- Full name: Club Comunicaciones
- Nicknames: Cartero; Comu
- Founded: 15 March 1931; 95 years ago
- Ground: Estadio Alfredo Ramos; Agronomía, Buenos Aires, Argentina
- Capacity: 3,500
- Chairman: Fiduciary body
- Manager: Sergio Leroy
- League: Primera B
- 2018-19: 18th
- Website: clubcomunicaciones.com.ar
Home colours	Away colours

Club Comunicaciones is an Argentine sports club based in the Agronomía district of Buenos Aires. The football team currently plays in Primera B Metropolitana, the regionalised third division of the Argentine football league system.

Other sports and activities hosted by Comunicaciones are artistic gymnastics, baseball, boxing, field hockey, futsal, handball, roller hockey, martial arts, tennis, and volleyball.

== History ==
The club was founded for a group of employees of the Argentine Post office company. The name chosen was Club Atlético Correos y Telégrafos, referring to the name of the State mail company they worked for. In 1953 the club changed to its current name.

At a sporting level, Comunicaciones offers a large variety of activities, such as gymnasiums, basketball courts, roller hockey, handball, tennis courts, extra football pitches and the main stadium. The club also is famous for having hosted the carnival celebrations during the 1950s and 1960s.

The colors that identify the club (yellow and black) were adopted because of those were the distinctive colors used by mail companies worldwide. The football squad has never played in the top category in Argentina.

=== Financial problems ===
By 2011 the club has a debt of $ 6,700 million and had been declared in bankruptcy. Many afferent showed their interest in buying Comunicaciones: the Government of the City of Buenos Aires was one of them.

== Players ==
Note: Flags indicate national team as defined under FIFA eligibility rules; some limited exceptions apply. Players may hold more than one non-FIFA nationality.

No.	Pos.	Nation	Player
—	GK	ARG	Estéfano Francesconi
—	GK	ARG	Gonzalo Yordan
—	GK	ARG	Julian Kadijevic
—	DF	PAR	Angel Alonso
—	DF	ARG	Lucas Banegas
—	DF	ARG	Agustin Cattaneo
—	DF	ARG	Marcelo Chavez
—	DF	ARG	Ariel Coronel
—	DF	ARG	Nicolas Ibañez
—	DF	ARG	Rodrigo Izco
—	DF	ARG	Pablo Pintos
—	DF	ARG	Alejandro Strelau
—	DF	ARG	Akira Taira
—	DF	ARG	Cristian Varela
—	DF	ARG	Sebastián Corda
—	DF	ARG	Federico Gay
—	DF	ARG	Tomás Gramisci
—	DF	ARG	Guillermo Pfund
—	DF	ARG	Hernán Ruquet
—	DF	ARG	Sebastián Silguero
—	MF	ARG	Rodrigo Lastra
—	MF	ARG	Enzo Oviedo
—	MF	ARG	Jonatan Soria
—	MF	ARG	Santiago Tossi
—	MF	ARG	Franco Perinciolo
—	MF	ARG	Matías Verdún

No.	Pos.	Nation	Player
—	MF	ARG	Diego Casoppero
—	MF	ARG	Federico Barrionuevo
—	MF	ARG	Damian Castagno
—	MF	ARG	Claudio Cebasco
—	MF	ARG	Alexander Corro
—	MF	ARG	Favio De Francesco
—	MF	ARG	Nicolas Estevez
—	MF	ARG	Victor Frete
—	MF	ARG	Nicolas Paolorossi
—	MF	ARG	Marcelo Perugini
—	MF	ARG	Juan Pierro
—	MF	ARG	Dario Ramella
—	MF	ARG	Leandro Staino
—	MF	ARG	Hector Vatter
—	MF	ARG	Mauro Miraglia
—	FW	ARG	Ivan Manuel Gibelli
—	FW	ARG	Hernan Gonzalez
—	FW	ARG	Mariano Martinez
—	FW	URU	Rafael Melo
—	FW	ARG	Lucas Passerini
—	FW	ARG	Pablo Vacaria
—	FW	ARG	Nicolás Giovagnoli
—	FW	ARG	Juan Bautista Arricau
—	FW	ARG	Fernando Maldonado
—	FW	ARG	Julián Rodríguez
—	FW	ARG	Alexis Vaiani

== Titles ==
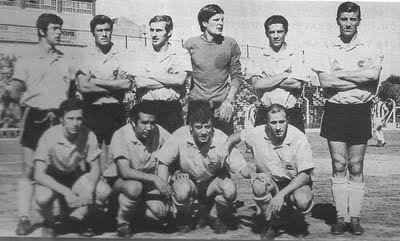
The 1969 team that achieved the first championship for the club.

- Primera C (2): 1969, 2004–05
