= 2019–20 Club de Gimnasia y Esgrima La Plata season =

Gimnasia y Esgrima
2019–20 season
- President: Gabriel Pellegrino
- Manager: Darío Ortiz (until 2 September 2019); Leandro Martini & Mariano Messera (int.) (from 2 September 2019 to 5 September 2019); Diego Maradona (from 5 September 2019)
- Stadium: Estadio Juan Carmelo Zerillo
- Copa Argentina: Round of 32
- Top goalscorer: League: Matías García (5); All: Matías García (5)

The 2019–20 season is Gimnasia y Esgrima's 8th consecutive season in the top division of Argentine football. In addition to the Primera División, the club are competing in the Copa Argentina and Copa de la Superliga.

The season generally covers the period from 1 July 2019 to 30 June 2020.

== Review ==
=== Pre-season ===
Gimnasia y Esgrima's first occurrence of note arrived on 23 June 2019, as right-back Facundo Oreja ended his seven-year stint with them to join newly promoted Primera B Nacional team Barracas Central. Sebastián Moyano also departed, with Unión Santa Fe snapping him up on 25 June. The club's appeared on the pitch for the opening time on 26 June, facing Everton of La Plata back-to-back at the Estancia Chica. A goal from Leandro Contín won them game one, before goals came from Lucas Calderón, Lucas Licht, Khalil Caraballo and José Paradela for a 5–0 win in game two. Days later, they played twice against Temperley; drawing 1–1 and winning 2–0. Diego Parini agreed to join GD Mirandês on 30 June. Ezequiel Bonifacio followed Moyano to Unión on 29 June.

Numerous loans from the previous campaign officially expired on and around 30 June. Santiago Silva left on 1 July, signing for Argentinos Juniors. Leonardo Morales and Maximiliano Caire came the other way, penning respective contracts from Santamarina and Defensa y Justicia. Lorenzo Faravelli secured a deal with Huracán on 2 July. Horacio Tijanovich scored as Gimnasia drew with Argentinos Juniors in a friendly on 3 July, prior to Jesús Vargas netting in the second match with the La Paternal outfit. Matías García sealed a return to Gimnasia on 3 July, after three years away with San Martín. Consecutive two-nil victories were recorded in friendlies with Fénix of the Uruguayan Primera División on 5 July. An offer from Genoa for Jan Hurtado was accepted on 9 July.

Gimnasia lost in two exhibition games on 10 July to Lanús. Hurtado, despite having an offer from Genoa accepted, completed a transfer to Boca Juniors on 11 July. Pablo Velázquez signed with the club later that day, penning terms from Nacional. Genoa's Claudio Spinelli arrived on loan on 15 July, twenty-four hours before to Marco Torsiglieri's incoming. Hernán Tifner and Daian García went to Huracán Las Heras on loan on 14 July. Maximiliano Comba, who was loaned in the previous season, received a permanent contract on 17 July, on a day that also saw them beat Atlético Chascomús across two friendlies.

=== July ===
Gimnasia y Esgrima started their competitive campaign on 20 July, as they lost in the Copa Argentina round of thirty-two to Defensa y Justicia; going out on penalties following a 1–1 at home. Earlier in the day, a Gimnasia shadow eleven took part in a friendly with Platense - losing by two. Matías García scored on his first league appearance back with Gimnasia on 28 July, as his goal got them a point away from home against Lanús. Janeiler Rivas, after a spell in India with NorthEast United, moved to Gimnasia on 31 July.

=== August ===
Brahian Alemán sealed a move in on 3 August from Al-Ettifaq, twelve months after he had joined the Saudi Arabian outfit from Gimnasia. After drawing versus Lanús, Gimnasia followed that up with a home loss at the hands of San Lorenzo on 4 August. Cristian Zone departed to Flandria on 8 August. Gimnasia played two thirty-minute friendlies with Independiente on 10 August, drawing initially before winning 2–0. On 14 August, it was reported that former player Santiago Silva had been provisionally suspended after he failed a drugs test; taken after a Copa de la Superliga match with Newell's Old Boys in April; Argentinos soon revealed Silva was going through fertility treatment at the time. Gianluca Simeone was loaned to Ibiza of Spain's Segunda División B on 13 August.

Gimnasia, on 19 August, lost 2–1 to Colón in the Primera División. Gonzalo Mottes signed for Defensores de Belgrano on 21 August. Gimnasia's losing run at the start their league campaign continued on 24 August, as Defensa y Justicia's Rafael Delgado scored to give his side the three points. A fourth straight loss arrived for Darío Ortiz's men on 31 August, with Argentinos Juniors defeating them at the Estadio Diego Armando Maradona in a fixture that also saw senior debutant Khalil Caraballo get sent off.

=== September ===
On 2 September, Gimnasia confirmed Darío Ortiz had mutually terminated his contract; with Leandro Martini and Mariano Messera coming in as joint-interim managers. Their stints lasted just days however, as 1986 FIFA World Cup winner Diego Maradona was unveiled as the new manager of Gimnasia on 5 September.

== Squad ==
Squad No.	Nationality	Name	Position(s)	Date of Birth (age)	Signed from
Goalkeepers
1	Argentina	Nelson Insfrán	GK	24 May 1995 (age 31)	Academy
12	Argentina	Tomás Durso	GK	26 February 1999 (age 27)	Academy
31	Argentina	Alexis Martín Arias	GK	4 July 1992 (age 34)	Academy
Defenders
2	Argentina	Jonathan Chacón	CB	27 February 1998 (age 28)	Academy
4	Argentina	Leonardo Morales	RB	11 April 1991 (age 35)	Santamarina
5	Colombia	Janeiler Rivas	CB	18 May 1988 (age 38)	NorthEast United
6	Argentina	Marco Torsiglieri	CB	12 January 1988 (age 38)	Rosario Central
15	Argentina	Maximiliano Caire	RB	12 July 1988 (age 38)	Defensa y Justicia
23	Argentina	Maximiliano Coronel	CB	28 April 1989 (age 37)	River Plate
24	Argentina	Germán Guiffrey	CB	21 December 1997 (age 28)	Academy
25	Argentina	Lucas Licht	LB	6 April 1981 (age 45)	Racing Club
27	Argentina	Guillermo Enrique	RB	24 February 2000 (age 26)	Academy
28	Argentina	Manuel Guanini	CB	14 February 1996 (age 30)	Academy
32	Argentina	Matías Melluso	LB	9 June 1998 (age 28)	Academy
36	Argentina	Rodrigo Gallo	LB	24 February 2000 (age 26)	Academy
Midfielders
7	Argentina	Franco Mussis	CM	19 April 1992 (age 34)	San Lorenzo
10	Argentina	Matías García	LM	22 October 1991 (age 35)	San Martín
14	Argentina	Agustín Bolívar	DM	9 January 1996 (age 30)	Academy
16	Paraguay	Víctor Ayala	CM	1 January 1988 (age 38)	Barcelona
19	Argentina	Juan Cataldi	AM	17 December 1998 (age 27)	Academy
20	Uruguay	Brahian Alemán	AM	23 December 1989 (age 36)	Al-Ettifaq
22	Argentina	Matías Miranda	LM	5 May 2000 (age 26)	Academy
26	Argentina	José Paradela	AM	15 December 1998 (age 27)	Rivadavia
34	Argentina	Patricio Monti	DM	15 January 1998 (age 28)	Academy
39	Argentina	Lautaro Chávez	AM	17 January 2001 (age 25)	Academy
	Argentina	Enzo Martínez	MF	9 September 1996 (age 30)	Rivadavia
Forwards
8	Argentina	Claudio Spinelli	CF	21 June 1997 (age 29)	Genoa (loan)
9	Argentina	Leandro Contín	CF	7 December 1995 (age 30)	Academy
11	Argentina	Horacio Tijanovich	LW	28 February 1996 (age 30)	Defensores de Pronunciamiento
13	Venezuela	Jesús Vargas	LW	26 August 1999 (age 27)	Estudiantes de Mérida
17	Paraguay	Pablo Velázquez	CF	12 March 1987 (age 39)	Nacional
29	Argentina	Lucas Calderón	FW	30 June 1998 (age 28)	Academy
30	Argentina	Maximiliano Comba	RW	16 January 1994 (age 32)	Estudiantes (RC)
33	Argentina	Matías Gómez	FW	10 August 1998 (age 28)	Academy
37	Argentina	Khalil Caraballo	FW	3 January 1999 (age 27)	Academy
43	Argentina	Agustín Ramírez	FW	2 May 2000 (age 26)	Academy
	Argentina	Braian Mansilla	CF	16 April 1997 (age 29)	Racing Club (loan)
	Argentina	Eric Ramírez	RW	21 September 1996 (age 30)	Academy
Out on loan					Loaned to
18	Argentina	Gianluca Simeone	CF	23 July 1998 (age 28)	Ibiza
	Argentina	Daian García	RW	25 February 1997 (age 29)	Huracán Las Heras
	Argentina	Nicolás Ortiz	CB	4 March 1995 (age 31)	Olmedo
	Argentina	Hernán Tifner	AM	20 September 1996 (age 30)	Huracán Las Heras

== Transfers ==
Domestic transfer windows:
3 July 2019 to 24 September 2019
20 January 2020 to 19 February 2020.

=== Transfers in ===
Date from	Position	Nationality	Name	From	Ref.
3 July 2019 (Note: Deal agreed on 1 July 2019)	RB	Argentina	Leonardo Morales	Santamarina	
3 July 2019 (Note: Deal agreed on 1 July 2019)	RB	Argentina	Maximiliano Caire	Defensa y Justicia	
3 July 2019	LM	Argentina	Matías García	San Martín	
11 July 2019	CF	Paraguay	Pablo Velázquez	Nacional	
16 July 2019	CB	Argentina	Marco Torsiglieri	Rosario Central	
17 July 2019	RW	Argentina	Maximiliano Comba	Estudiantes (RC)	
31 July 2019	CB	Colombia	Janeiler Rivas	NorthEast United	
3 August 2019	LM	Uruguay	Brahian Alemán	Al-Ettifaq	

=== Transfers out ===
Date from	Position	Nationality	Name	To	Ref.
1 July 2019 (Note: Deal agreed on 28 June 2019)	LM	Argentina	Diego Parini	GD Mirandês	
3 July 2019 (Note: Deal agreed on 23 June 2019)	RB	Argentina	Facundo Oreja	Barracas Central	
3 July 2019 (Note: Deal agreed on 25 June 2019)	GK	Argentina	Sebastián Moyano	Unión Santa Fe	
3 July 2019 (Note: Deal agreed on 29 June 2019)	RB	Argentina	Ezequiel Bonifacio	Unión Santa Fe	
3 July 2019 (Note: Deal agreed on 1 July 2019)	CF	Argentina	Santiago Silva	Barracas Central	
3 July 2019 (Note: Deal agreed on 2 July 2019)	AM	Argentina	Lorenzo Faravelli	Huracán	
11 July 2019	CF	Venezuela	Jan Hurtado	Boca Juniors	
8 August 2019	FW	Argentina	Cristian Zone	Flandria	
21 August 2019	CB	Argentina	Gonzalo Mottes	Defensores de Belgrano	

=== Loans in ===
Start date	Position	Nationality	Name	From	End date	Ref.
15 July 2019	CF	Argentina	Claudio Spinelli	Genoa	30 June 2020	

=== Loans out ===
Start date	Position	Nationality	Name	To	End date	Ref.
14 July 2019	AM	Argentina	Hernán Tifner	Huracán Las Heras	30 June 2020	
14 July 2019	RW	Argentina	Daian García	Huracán Las Heras	30 June 2020	
13 August 2019	CF	Argentina	Gianluca Simeone	Ibiza	30 June 2020	

== Friendlies ==
=== Pre-season ===
On 14 June 2019, Gimnasia y Esgrima announced friendlies with Temperley (2), Argentinos Juniors (2) and Lanús. With the latter encounter coming away from home, the other fixtures would be played at the Estadio Juan Carmelo Zerillo. Prior to facing them, the club scheduled games with local La Plata outfit Everton for 26 June. Friendlies with Uruguayan team Fénix and local team Atlético Chascomús were also set.

Win Draw Loss

26 June 2019 Friendly	Gimnasia y Esgrima	1–0	Everton	La Plata, Argentina
	L. Contín	Gimnasia y Esgrima; Diagonales; 40 min. match		Stadium: Estancia Chica

26 June 2019 Friendly	Gimnasia y Esgrima	5–0	Everton	La Plata, Argentina
	L. Calderón; L. Licht; K. Caraballo; J. Paradela	Gimnasia y Esgrima; Diagonales; 40 min. match		Stadium: Estancia Chica

29 June 2019 Friendly	Gimnasia y Esgrima	1–1	Temperley	La Plata, Argentina
	B. Mansilla	Gimnasia y Esgrima; 50 min. match	M. Cerutti	Stadium: Estadio Juan Carmelo Zerillo

29 June 2019 Friendly	Gimnasia y Esgrima	2–0	Temperley	La Plata, Argentina
	L. Chávez; M. Gómez	Gimnasia y Esgrima; 50 min. match		Stadium: Estadio Juan Carmelo Zerillo

3 July 2019 Friendly	Gimnasia y Esgrima	1–1	Argentinos Juniors	La Plata, Argentina
	H. Tijanovich	Gimnasia y Esgrima	N. Silva	Stadium: Estadio Juan Carmelo Zerillo; Attendance: 0 (Note: Behind closed doors.)

3 July 2019 Friendly	Gimnasia y Esgrima	1–2	Argentinos Juniors	La Plata, Argentina
	J. Vargas	Gimnasia y Esgrima	R. Bobadilla; E. Gómez	Stadium: Estadio Juan Carmelo Zerillo; Attendance: 0 (Note: Behind closed doors.)

5 July 2019 Friendly	Gimnasia y Esgrima	2–0	Fénix	Argentina
	F. Mussis; B. Mansilla	Gimnasia y Esgrima; Diagonales

5 July 2019 Friendly	Gimnasia y Esgrima	2–0	Fénix	Argentina
	K. Caraballo; G. Guiffrey	Gimnasia y Esgrima; Diagonales

10 July 2019 Friendly	Lanús	1–0	Gimnasia y Esgrima	Lanús, Argentina
	J. Sand (pen.)	Gimnasia y Esgrima; Diagonales; 70 min. match		Stadium: Estadio Ciudad de Lanús – Néstor Díaz Pérez; Referee: Ramiro Rivero (Argentina)

10 July 2019 Friendly	Lanús	1–0	Gimnasia y Esgrima	Lanús, Argentina
	P. Martínez	Gimnasia y Esgrima; Diagonales; 70 min. match		Stadium: Estadio Ciudad de Lanús – Néstor Díaz Pérez; Referee: Ariel López (Argentina)

17 July 2019 Friendly	Gimnasia y Esgrima	4–0	Atlético Chascomús	La Plata, Argentina
	B. Mansilla; F. Mussis; L. Contín	Gimnasia y Esgrima; TyC Sports; 45 min. match		Stadium: Estancia Chica

17 July 2019 Friendly	Gimnasia y Esgrima	1–0	Atlético Chascomús	La Plata, Argentina
	G. Guiffrey	Gimnasia y Esgrima; TyC Sports; 45 min. match		Stadium: Estancia Chica

=== Mid-season ===
27 July saw Gimnasia y Esgrima face. Gimnasia and Independiente would face-off in Villa Domínico in friendlies on 10 August.

Win Draw Loss

27 July 2019 Friendly	Gimnasia y Esgrima	0–2	Platense	La Plata, Argentina
		Platense; Mundo Ascenso	A. Ramírez	Stadium: Estancia Chica; Attendance: 0 (Note: Behind closed doors.)

10 August 2019 Friendly	Gimnasia y Esgrima	0–0	Independiente	Villa Domínico, Argentina
		Gimnasia y Esgrima; Grupo La Provincia; 30 min. match		Stadium: Complejo Santa Domingo

10 August 2019 Friendly	Gimnasia y Esgrima	2–0	Independiente	Villa Domínico, Argentina
	P. Velázquez; M. Caire	Gimnasia y Esgrima; Grupo La Provincia; 30 min. match		Stadium: Complejo Santa Domingo

== Competitions ==
=== Primera División ===
==== League table ====
Pos	Team	Pld	W	D	L	GF	GA	GD	Pts
17	Banfield	23	6	8	9	19	23	−4	26
18	Central Córdoba (SdE)	23	6	8	9	21	29	−8	26
19	Gimnasia y Esgrima (LP)	23	6	5	12	22	23	−1	23
20	Patronato	23	5	8	10	22	34	−12	23
21	Huracán	23	5	7	11	17	27	−10	22

Source: AFA
Rules for classification: 1) points; 2) play-off (only if needed to decide championship); 3) goal difference; 4) goals scored; 5) head-to-head points; 6) head-to-head goal difference; 7) head-to-head goals scored.

==== Relegation table ====
Pos	Team	2017–18 Pts	2018–19 Pts	2019–20 Pts	Total Pts	Total Pld	Avg	Relegation
20	Newell's Old Boys	29	29	22	80	67	1.194	
21	Central Córdoba (SdE)	—	—	18	18	16	1.125	
22	Aldosivi	—	33	12	45	41	1.098	Relegation to Primera B Nacional
23	Patronato	33	26	13	72	67	1.075	Relegation to Primera B Nacional
24	Gimnasia y Esgrima (LP)	27	29	14	70	68	1.029	Relegation to Primera B Nacional

Source: AFA

==== Results summary ====
Overall								Home						Away					
Pld	W	D	L	GF	GA	GD	Pts	W	D	L	GF	GA	GD	W	D	L	GF	GA	GD
16	4	2	10	18	19	−1	14	1	0	7	3	10	−7	3	2	3	15	9	+6

Last updated: 9 December 2019.
Source: Soccerway

==== Matches ====
The fixtures for the 2019–20 campaign were released on 10 July.

Win Draw Loss

27 July 2019 1	Lanús	1–1	Gimnasia y Esgrima	Lanús, Argentina
17:45 GMT-3	L. Valenti 21'	Gimnasia y Esgrima; Infobae; Soccerway	M. García 60'	Stadium: Estadio Ciudad de Lanús – Néstor Díaz Pérez; Referee: Darío Herrera (Argentina)

4 August 2019 2	Gimnasia y Esgrima	0–1	San Lorenzo	La Plata, Argentina
13:15 GMT-3		Gimnasia y Esgrima; Infobae; Soccerway	B. Pittón 79'	Stadium: Estadio Juan Carmelo Zerillo; Referee: Fernando Espinoza (Argentina)

19 August 2019 3	Colón	2–1	Gimnasia y Esgrima	Santa Fe, Argentina
17:45 GMT-3	W. Morelo 40', 90+4'	Gimnasia y Esgrima; Infobae; Soccerway	P. Velázquez 54'	Stadium: Estadio Brigadier General Estanislao López; Referee: Jorge Baliño (Argentina)

24 August 2019 4	Gimnasia y Esgrima	0–1	Defensa y Justicia	La Plata, Argentina
13:15 GMT-3		Gimnasia y Esgrima; Infobae; Soccerway	R. Delgado 73'	Stadium: Estadio Juan Carmelo Zerillo; Referee: Andrés Merlos (Argentina)

31 August 2019 5	Argentinos Juniors	1–0	Gimnasia y Esgrima	Buenos Aires, Argentina
13:15 GMT-3	M. Miljevic 11'	Gimnasia y Esgrima; Infobae; Soccerway		Stadium: Estadio Diego Armando Maradona; Referee: Facundo Tello (Argentina)

6	Gimnasia y Esgrima	–	Racing Club	La Plata, Argentina
				Stadium: Estadio Juan Carmelo Zerillo

=== Copa Argentina ===
Domestic rivals Defensa y Justicia were the team Gimnasia y Esgrima were drawn to play in the round of thirty-two, at Temperley's Estadio Alfredo Beranger - it is usual for Copa Argentina matches to be played on neutral territory.

Win Draw Loss

20 July 2019 R32	Gimnasia y Esgrima	1–1 (3–4 p)	Defensa y Justicia	Turdera, Argentina
17:10 GMT-3	M. Comba 58'	Gimnasia y Esgrima; Infobae; Soccerway	M. Herrera 45+2'	Stadium: Estadio Alfredo Beranger; Referee: Ariel Penel (Argentina)
	Penalties
	M. García (penalty scored); B. Mansilla (penalty scored); P. Velázquez (penalty scored); H. Tijanovich (penalty missed); V. Ayala (penalty missed)		N. Fernández (penalty scored); G. Piovi (penalty scored); N. Tripichio (penalty scored); A. Castro (penalty scored)

=== Copa de la Superliga ===
Win Draw Loss

	–
00:00 GMT-3

== Squad statistics ==
=== Appearances and goals ===
No.	Pos.	Nationality	Name	League		Cup		League Cup		Continental		Total		Discipline		Ref
No.	Pos.	Nationality	Name	Apps	Goals	Apps	Goals	Apps	Goals	Apps	Goals	Apps	Goals	Yellow card	Red card	Ref
1	GK	Argentina	Tomás Durso	0	0	0	0	0	0	—		0	0	0	0	
2	CB	Argentina	Jonathan Chacón	0	0	0	0	0	0	—		0	0	0	0	
4	RB	Argentina	Leonardo Morales	5	0	1	0	0	0	—		6	0	0	0	
5	CB	Colombia	Janeiler Rivas	1	0	0	0	0	0	—		1	0	0	0	
6	CB	Argentina	Marco Torsiglieri	5	0	0	0	0	0	—		5	0	3	0	
7	RM	Argentina	Franco Mussis	3(1)	0	1	0	0	0	—		4(1)	0	1	0	
8	CF	Argentina	Claudio Spinelli	4(1)	0	0	0	0	0	—		4(1)	0	2	0	
9	CF	Argentina	Leandro Contín	0(1)	0	1	0	0	0	—		1(1)	0	0	0	
10	LM	Argentina	Matías García	5	1	1	0	0	0	—		6	1	4	0	
11	LW	Argentina	Horacio Tijanovich	4(1)	0	1	0	0	0	—		5(1)	0	2	0	
12	GK	Argentina	Nelson Insfrán	0	0	0	0	0	0	—		0	0	0	0	
13	LW	Venezuela	Jesús Vargas	0	0	0	0	0	0	—		0	0	0	0	
14	DM	Argentina	Agustín Bolívar	1(2)	0	0	0	0	0	—		1(2)	0	0	0	
15	RB	Argentina	Maximiliano Caire	1	0	0	0	0	0	—		1	0	2	1	
16	RM	Paraguay	Víctor Ayala	4	0	1	0	0	0	—		5	0	1	0	
17	CF	Paraguay	Pablo Velázquez	2(3)	1	0(1)	0	0	0	—		2(4)	1	0	0	
18	CF	Argentina	Gianluca Simeone	0	0	0	0	0	0	—		0	0	0	0	
19	AM	Argentina	Juan Cataldi	0	0	0	0	0	0	—		0	0	0	0	
20	LM	Uruguay	Brahian Alemán	3	0	0	0	0	0	—		3	0	1	0	
22	LM	Argentina	Matías Miranda	0	0	0	0	0	0	—		0	0	0	0	
23	CB	Argentina	Maximiliano Coronel	2	0	0	0	0	0	—		2	0	1	0	
24	CB	Argentina	Germán Guiffrey	0	0	1	0	0	0	—		1	0	0	0	
25	LB	Argentina	Lucas Licht	2(1)	0	0	0	0	0	—		2(1)	0	0	0	
26	AM	Argentina	José Paradela	0	0	0	0	0	0	—		0	0	0	0	
27	DF	Argentina	Guillermo Enrique	0	0	0	0	0	0	—		0	0	0	0	
28	CB	Argentina	Manuel Guanini	1	0	1	0	0	0	—		2	0	1	0	
29	FW	Argentina	Lucas Calderón	0	0	0	0	0	0	—		0	0	0	0	
30	RW	Argentina	Maximiliano Comba	4(1)	0	1	1	0	0	—		5(1)	1	2	0	
31	GK	Argentina	Alexis Martín Arias	5	0	1	0	0	0	—		6	0	1	0	
32	LB	Argentina	Matías Melluso	3	0	1	0	0	0	—		4	0	2	0	
33	FW	Argentina	Matías Gómez	0(3)	0	0	0	0	0	—		0(3)	0	2	0	
34	MF	Argentina	Patricio Monti	0	0	0	0	0	0	—		0	0	0	0	
37	FW	Argentina	Khalil Caraballo	0(1)	0	0	0	0	0	—		0(1)	0	0	1	
39	AM	Argentina	Lautaro Chávez	0	0	0(1)	0	0	0	—		0(1)	0	0	0	
43	FW	Argentina	Agustín Ramírez	0	0	0	0	0	0	—		0	0	0	0	
–	MF	Argentina	Enzo Martínez	0	0	0	0	0	0	—		0	0	0	0	
–	RW	Argentina	Daian García	0	0	0	0	0	0	—		0	0	0	0	
–	CF	Argentina	Braian Mansilla	0	0	0(1)	0	0	0	—		0(1)	0	0	0	
–	CB	Argentina	Nicolás Ortiz	0	0	0	0	0	0	—		0	0	0	0	
–	RW	Argentina	Eric Ramírez	0	0	0	0	0	0	—		0	0	0	0	
–	AM	Argentina	Hernán Tifner	0	0	0	0	0	0	—		0	0	0	0	
Own goals				—	0	—	0	—	0	—		—	0	—	—	—

Statistics accurate as of 31 August 2019.

=== Goalscorers ===
Rank	Pos	No.	Nat	Name	League	Cup	League Cup	Continental	Total	Ref
1	RW	30	Argentina	Maximiliano Comba	0	1	0	–	1	
1	LM	10	Argentina	Matías García	1	0	0	–	1	
1	CF	17	Paraguay	Pablo Velázquez	1	0	0	–	1	
Own goals					0	0	0	–	0	
Totals					2	1	0	–	3	—
