= 2018 Copa Argentina final =

Argentina football tournament final

2018 Copa Argentina Final
- Event: 2017–18 Copa Argentina
Rosario Central	Gimnasia y Esgrima (LP)
1	1
- Rosario Central won 4–1 on penalties
- Date: December 6, 2018
- Venue: Estadio Malvinas Argentinas, Mendoza
- Man of the Match: Jeremías Ledesma (Rosario Central)
- Referee: Patricio Loustau

The 2018 Copa Argentina Final was the 135th and final match of the 2017–18 Copa Argentina. It was played on December 6, 2018 at the Estadio Malvinas Argentinas in Mendoza between Rosario Central and Gimnasia y Esgrima (LP).

Rosario Central defeated Gimnasia y Esgrima (LP) on penalties in the final to win their first title. As champions, they qualified for the 2018 Supercopa Argentina and the 2019 Copa Libertadores group stage.

== Qualified teams ==
Team	Previous finals app.
Rosario Central	3 (2014, 2015, 2016)
Gimnasia y Esgrima (LP)	None

Bold indicates winning years

=== Road to the final ===
Rosario Central			Round	Gimnasia y Esgrima (LP)		
Opponent	Venue	Score		Opponent	Venue	Score
Juventud Antoniana	Santa Fe	6–0	Round of 64	Sportivo Belgrano	Turdera	1–0
Talleres (C)	Lanús	0–0 (5–3 p)	Round of 32	Olimpo	Cutral Có	1–0
Almagro	Santa Fe	1–1 (5–4 p)	Round of 16	Boca Juniors	Córdoba	1–0
Newell's Old Boys	Sarandí	2–1	Quarterfinals	Central Córdoba (SdE)	Rafaela	1–1 (4–3 p)
Temperley	Córdoba	1–1 (4–2 p)	Semifinals	River Plate	Mar del Plata	2–2 (5–4 p)

== Match ==
=== Details ===
2017–18 Copa Argentina Final
December 6, 2018
21:10

Rosario Central	1–1	Gimnasia y Esgrima (LP)
Zampedri 19'	Report	Faravelli 52'
Penalties
Ortigoza (penalty scored); Ruben (penalty scored); Parot (penalty scored); Caruzzo (penalty scored)	4–1	(penalty missed) Silva; (penalty missed) Guanini; (penalty scored) Hurtado

Malvinas Argentinas, Mendoza
Referee: Patricio Loustau

**Rosario Central**	**Gimnasia y Esgrima (LP)**

GK	1	(Argentina) Jeremías Ledesma
DF	4	(Argentina) Gonzalo Bettini	(yellow card) 45'
DF	2	(Argentina) Matías Caruzzo
DF	26	(Colombia) Óscar Cabezas	(yellow card) 43'
DF	24	(Chile) Alfonso Parot
MF	15	(Uruguay) Washington Camacho		(substituted off) 83'
MF	10	(Paraguay) Néstor Ortigoza
MF	5	(Argentina) Leonardo Gil	(yellow card) 29'	(substituted off) 53'
MF	8	(Argentina) Federico Carrizo
FW	9	(Argentina) Marco Ruben (c)
FW	20	(Argentina) Fernando Zampedri		(substituted off) 70'
Substitutes:
GK	31	(Argentina) Josué Ayala
DF	6	(Argentina) Marcelo Ortiz
MF	14	(Uruguay) Diego Arismendi
MF	18	(Argentina) Andrés Lioi		(substituted on) 83'
MF	25	(Argentina) Emmanuel Ojeda		(substituted on) 53'
FW	17	(Argentina) Germán Herrera		(substituted on) 70'
FW	34	(Argentina) Maximiliano Lovera
Manager:
(Argentina) Edgardo Bauza

GK	31	(Argentina) Alexis Martín Arias
DF	16	(Paraguay) Víctor Ayala
DF	28	(Argentina) Manuel Guanini	(yellow card) 29'
DF	24	(Argentina) Germán Guiffrey
DF	32	(Argentina) Matías Melluso
MF	30	(Argentina) Maximiliano Comba
MF	21	(Argentina) Fabián Rinaudo (c)
MF	8	(Argentina) Lorenzo Faravelli	(yellow card) 17'	(substituted off) 79'
MF	25	(Argentina) Lucas Licht	(yellow card) 67'	(substituted off) 74'
FW	11	(Argentina) Horacio Tijanovich		(substituted off) 46'
FW	9	(Uruguay) Santiago Silva
Substitutes:
GK	15	(Argentina) Sebastián Moyano
DF	4	(Argentina) Facundo Oreja
MF	13	(Argentina) Facundo Gutiérrez		(substituted on) 79'
MF	19	(Argentina) Juan Cataldi
MF	33	(Argentina) Matías Gómez	(yellow card) 90+3'	(substituted on) 74'
MF	34	(Argentina) Patricio Monti
FW	17	(Venezuela) Jan Carlos Hurtado		(substituted on) 46'
Manager:
(Argentina) Pedro Troglio

Man of the Match:
Jeremías Ledesma (Rosario Central)

Assistant referees:
Diego Bonfá
Ezequiel Brailovsky
Fourth official:
Julio Barraza

**Match rules**

- 90 minutes
- Penalty shoot-out if scores still level
- Seven named substitutes
- Maximum of three substitutions

=== Statistics ===
Overall
	Rosario Central	Gimnasia y Esgrima (LP)
Goals scored	1	1
Total shots	5	8
Shots on target	3	4
Ball possession	46%	54%
Corner kicks	0	7
Fouls committed	20	16
Offsides	0	0
Yellow cards	3	4
Red cards	0	0
