= Matías Miranda =

Argentine footballer (born 2000)

Personal information
- Date of birth: 5 May 2000 (age 26)
- Place of birth: La Plata, Argentina
- Height: 1.74 m (5 ft 9 in)
- Position: Left midfielder

Team information
- Current team: Macará (on loan from Defensa y Justicia)
- Number: 10

Youth career
- 2006–2019: Gimnasia LP

Senior career*
Years	Team	Apps	(Gls)
2019–2025	Gimnasia LP	61	(0)
2025–	Defensa y Justicia	11	(1)
2026–	→ Macará (loan)	2	(0)
- * Club domestic league appearances and goals as of 17:27, 13 March 2026 (UTC)

Matías Miranda (born 5 May 2000) is an Argentine professional footballer who plays as a left midfielder for Macará, on loan from Defensa y Justicia.

== Club career ==
Miranda is a product of the Gimnasia y Esgrima youth system, having joined in 2006. He made the step into senior football in 2019–20, with Diego Maradona selecting him as a substitute for a Primera División fixture with River Plate on 28 September. Maradona subsequently subbed the midfielder on after fifty-six minutes, as he replaced Horacio Tijanovich in the two-goal home defeat.

== International career ==
In November 2016, Miranda was called up by Miguel Mico to train with the Argentina U17s.

== Career statistics ==
As of 28 September 2019.

Appearances and goals by club, season and competition
Club	Season	League			Cup		League Cup		Continental		Other		Total	
Club	Season	Division	Apps	Goals	Apps	Goals	Apps	Goals	Apps	Goals	Apps	Goals	Apps	Goals
Gimnasia y Esgrima	2019–20	Primera División	1	0	0	0	0	0	—		0	0	1	0
Career total			1	0	0	0	0	0	—		0	0	1	0
