= Eric Ramírez =

Eric Ramírez may refer to:

- Eric Ramírez (footballer, born 1996), Argentine forward for Club Atlético Huracán
- Eric Ramírez (footballer, born 1998), Venezuelan forward for ŠK Slovan Bratislava
