= Lucas Calderón =

Argentine footballer

Personal information
- Full name: Lucas Calderón
- Date of birth: 30 June 1998 (age 28)
- Place of birth: La Plata, Argentina
- Height: 1.75 m (5 ft 9 in)
- Position: Forward

Youth career
- Estudiantes de La Plata
- 2017–2018: Gimnasia y Esgrima La Plata

Senior career*
Years	Team	Apps	(Gls)
2018–2021	Gimnasia y Esgrima La Plata	4	(0)
2020	→ Villa San Carlos (loan)	6	(0)
2021	→ Cipolletti (loan)	11	(2)
2022	Sportivo Las Parejas	19	(0)
2023–2024	C.A. Bella Vista	12	(0)
- * Club domestic league appearances and goals as of 19:09, 15 May 2024 (UTC)

Lucas Calderón (born 30 June 1998) is an Argentine former professional footballer who played as a forward and his last team was C.A. Bella Vista.

== Career ==
Calderón joined Gimnasia y Esgrima La Plata in October 2017, having previously been with Estudiantes de La Plata.

After being an unused substitute for a 2017–18 Argentine Primera División match with Newell's Old Boys on 14 May 2018, Calderón made his professional debut in the following campaign of 2018–19 against Godoy Cruz on 6 October at the Estadio Juan Carmelo Zerillo.

To obtain continuity, integrate the Villa San Carlos, Cipolletti and Sportivo Las Parejas teams, all from Argentine territory.

In May 2024, and belonging to the Bella Vista club in Uruguay, he decided to retire from playing soccer to dedicate himself to real estate.

== Personal life ==
Calderón is the son of former footballer José Luis Calderón.

== Career statistics ==
As of 13 October 2018.

Club statistics
Club	Season	League			Cup (Note: Includes the Copa Argentina)		League Cup		Continental		Other		Total	
Club	Season	Division	Apps	Goals	Apps	Goals	Apps	Goals	Apps	Goals	Apps	Goals	Apps	Goals
Gimnasia y Esgrima	2017–18	Primera División	0	0	0	0	—		—		0	0	0	0
Gimnasia y Esgrima	2018–19	Primera División	1	0	0	0	—		—		0	0	1	0
Career total			1	0	0	0	—		—		0	0	1	0
