= Agustín Ramírez (footballer) =

Argentine footballer (born 2000)

Personal information
- Full name: Elías Agustín Ramírez
- Date of birth: 2 May 2000 (age 26)
- Place of birth: Concordia, Argentina
- Position: Forward

Team information
- Current team: Mitre

Youth career
- Club Salto Grande
- 2016–2019: Gimnasia LP

Senior career*
Years	Team	Apps	(Gls)
2019–2024	Gimnasia LP	5	(0)
2022	→ Ferro Pico (loan)	9	(0)
2024–	Mitre	16	(2)

International career
- Argentina U19
- * Club domestic league appearances and goals as of 17:29, 2 May 2026 (UTC)

Elías Agustín Ramírez (born 2 May 2000) is an Argentine professional footballer who plays as a forward for Mitre.

== Club career ==
Ramírez's youth career got underway with Club Salto Grande, before he signed for Gimnasia y Esgrima in 2016. He made the move into senior football in April 2019 under manager Darío Ortiz, coming off the substitutes bench in a Primera División victory at the Estadio Juan Carmelo Zerillo against Colón on 6 April 2019.

On 7 March 2022, Ramírez joined Torneo Federal A club Ferro Pico on a loan deal until the end of the year.

== International career ==
Ramírez received numerous call-ups from the Argentina U19s, including for the 2018 South American Games in Bolivia.

== Personal life ==
Ramírez's brother, Eric, is a professional footballer; he also started his career with Gimnasia y Esgrima.

== Career statistics ==
As of 6 April 2019.

Appearances and goals by club, season and competition
Club	Season	League			Cup		Continental		Other		Total	
Club	Season	Division	Apps	Goals	Apps	Goals	Apps	Goals	Apps	Goals	Apps	Goals
Gimnasia y Esgrima	2018–19	Primera División	1	0	0	0	—		0	0	1	0
Career total			1	0	0	0	—		0	0	1	0
