= Alexis Arias =

Alexis Arias may refer to:

- Alexis Arias (rower) (born 1969), Cuban rower
- Alexis Arias (footballer) (born 1995), Peruvian footballer

See also:

- Alexis Martín Arias (born 1992), Argentine footballer
