= Khalil Caraballo =

Argentine professional footballer

Personal information
- Date of birth: 3 January 1999 (age 27)
- Place of birth: La Dulce, Argentina
- Height: 1.85 m (6 ft 1 in)
- Position: Forward

Team information
- Current team: Ciudad de Bolívar

Youth career
- Deportivo La Dulce
- 2015–2019: Gimnasia LP

Senior career*
Years	Team	Apps	(Gls)
2018–2021	Gimnasia LP	1	(0)
2020	→ Juventud Unida (loan)	7	(1)
2020–2021	→ Guillermo Brown (loan)	9	(1)
2023–2024	San Martín de Burzaco	53	(8)
2024–2025	Colón Chivilcoy	4	(2)
2025–	Club Ciudad de Bolívar	33	(13)
- * Club domestic league appearances and goals as of 17:07, 25 April 2026 (UTC)

Khalil Caraballo (born 3 January 1999) is an Argentine professional footballer who plays as a forward for Club Ciudad de Bolívar in the Primera Nacional of Argentina.

== Career ==
Caraballo spent four years of his youth career with Gimnasia y Esgrima, having signed from Deportivo La Dulce in 2015. He was promoted into Gimnasia's first-team squad for the 2019–20 season, initially featuring in pre-season when he scored against Everton and Fénix. His first experience of senior football arrived on 31 August 2019, as he was selected as a substitute for a Primera División fixture away from home against Argentinos Juniors. Darío Ortiz substituted him on after sixty-five minutes for Claudio Spinelli, though the forward would depart seven minutes later after receiving a straight red card from referee Facundo Tello.

On 16 August 2020, Caraballo signed for Guillermo Brown.

For the 2025 season, he became a player for Ciudad Bolívar, where he arrived after playing in Colón Chivilcoy.

== Career statistics ==
As of 31 August 2019.

Appearances and goals by club, season and competition
Club	Season	League			Cup		League Cup		Continental		Other		Total	
Club	Season	Division	Apps	Goals	Apps	Goals	Apps	Goals	Apps	Goals	Apps	Goals	Apps	Goals
Gimnasia y Esgrima	2019–20	Primera División	1	0	0	0	0	0	—		0	0	1	0
Career total			1	0	0	0	0	0	—		0	0	1	0

== Honours ==
Ciudad Bolívar

- Torneo Federal A : 2025
