= Enzo Martínez =

Enzo Martínez may refer to:

- Enzo Martínez (footballer, born 1990), Uruguayan midfielder playing in the United States
- Enzo Martínez (footballer, born 1996), Argentine midfielder
- Enzo Martínez (footballer, born 1998), Uruguayan defender
- Enzo Martínez (swimmer) (born 1994), Uruguayan swimmer
