= Gastón Sessa =

Argentine footballer (born 1973)

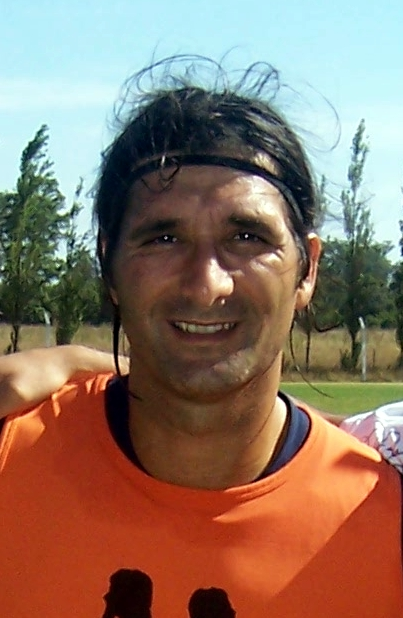
- Sessa with Gimnasia La Plata in 2009

Personal information
- Full name: Gastón Alejandro Sessa
- Date of birth: 15 April 1973 (age 53)
- Place of birth: La Plata, Argentina
- Height: 1.90 m (6 ft 3 in)
- Position: Goalkeeper

Senior career*
Years	Team	Apps	(Gls)
1993–1995	Estudiantes	6	(0)
1995–1997	Huracán Corrientes	34	(0)
1997–1998	Rosario Central	37	(0)
1998–1999	Racing Club	36	(0)
1999–2000	River Plate	2	(0)
2000–2001	Racing Club	34	(0)
2001–2007	Vélez Sársfield	160	(0)
2004	→ UD Las Palmas (loan)	12	(0)
2007–2008	Barcelona SC	31	(0)
2008–2011	Gimnasia La Plata	95	(0)
2011–2013	Boca Unidos	71	(0)
2013–2015	Villa San Carlos	56	(0)
2015	Boca Unidos	30	(0)
2016	Villa San Carlos	16	(0)
2018	Atlético Chascomús	–	(–)
2022	Peñarol de Olmos	–	(–)
2024	Deportivo Chascomús	–	(–)
Total		620	(0)
- * Club domestic league appearances and goals

Gastón Alejandro Sessa (born 15 April 1973 in La Plata) is an Argentine former professional footballer who played as a goalkeeper.

== Club career ==
Sessa started his career with local club Estudiantes in 1993 before moving down a division to join Huracán Corrientes in 1995. His first major honour as a player came in the 1995/1996 season when he helped Huracán win promotion to the Primera División Argentina by winning the Primera B Nacional.

After one season playing with Huracán in the Primera he moved to Rosario Central and then Racing Club. In 1999, he joined River Plate where he was part of the squad that won back to back the Apertura 1999 and Clausura 2000 championships. He was a substitute for Roberto Bonano in both tournaments. In 2000, he rejoined Racing for another season before moving on to Vélez Sársfield. In 2004, he had a loan spell with UD Las Palmas in Spain before returning to Velez. In 2005, he helped Velez to claim the Clausura 2005.

In 2007, Sessa decided to seek a new challenge by moving to Ecuador and signing a 2-year contract to join Barcelona Sporting Club. He then returned to Argentina in 2008 to play for Gimnasia y Esgrima La Plata.

Sessa has a history of disciplinary and anger problems which ultimately led to his departure from Vélez Sársfield. In one occasion he kicked Boca Junior's striker Rodrigo Palacio in the face, prompting his sending off and awarding a penalty kick for Boca. His actions received high criticism from the media, being labeled as a "butcher", a common designation in Argentina for players who commit violent fouls.

Retired in 2016, Sessa returned to football by joining Atlético Chascomús in the 2018 Torneo Federal C, aged 44. In 2022, he joined Peñarol de Olmos. Retired again, he joined Deportivo Chascomús in the 2024–2025 Torneo Regional Federal Amateur at the age of 51 to play alongside his son, Valentino, also a goalkeeper.

== Honours ==
Huracán Corrientes

- Primera B Nacional: 1995–96

River Plate

- Primera División Argentina (2): Apertura 1999, Clausura 2000

Vélez Sársfield

- Primera División Argentina: Clausura 2005

Individual

- Ubaldo Fillol Award (lowest "goals-to-games" ratio): Apertura 2008
