= Lautaro Chávez =

Argentine footballer

Personal information
- Date of birth: 17 January 2001 (age 25)
- Place of birth: Lavalle, Argentina
- Height: 1.75 m (5 ft 9 in)
- Positions: Winger; attacking midfielder

Team information
- Current team: Aldosivi
- Number: 80

Youth career
- 2015–2018: Gimnasia LP

Senior career*
Years	Team	Apps	(Gls)
2018–2025	Gimnasia LP	43	(1)
2024	→ Defensores de Belgrano (loan)	8	(0)
2025–	Aldosivi	12	(0)
- * Club domestic league appearances and goals as of 17:45, 28 November 2025 (UTC)

Lautaro Chávez (born 17 January 2001) is an Argentine professional footballer who plays as a winger or an attacking midfielder for Aldosivi.

== Club career ==
Chávez started his senior career in La Plata with Gimnasia y Esgrima, who he signed for in 2015. He made his first appearance for the Primera División club on 9 March 2018 against Banfield, he was substituted on for the final seven minutes having been an unused substitutes for previous fixtures with Estudiantes and San Lorenzo. Another appearance followed versus San Martín as Gimnasia y Esgrima placed twenty-third in 2017–18 under Darío Ortiz.

== International career ==
Chávez received an Argentina U18 call-up in July 2019 for the L'Alcúdia International Tournament in Spain.

== Career statistics ==
As of 25 February 2019.

Appearances and goals by club, season and competition
Club	Season	League			Cup		Continental		Other		Total	
Club	Season	Division	Apps	Goals	Apps	Goals	Apps	Goals	Apps	Goals	Apps	Goals
Gimnasia y Esgrima	2017–18	Primera División	2	0	0	0	—		0	0	2	0
Gimnasia y Esgrima	2018–19	Primera División	0	0	0	0	—		0	0	0	0
Career total			2	0	0	0	—		0	0	2	0
