= Damián Giménez =

Argentine footballer

Personal information
- Full name: Damián Joel Giménez
- Date of birth: February 26, 1982 (age 44)
- Place of birth: Lomas de Zamora, Argentina
- Height: 1.87 m (6 ft 2 in)
- Position: Defender

Senior career*
Years	Team	Apps	(Gls)
2001–2005	Banfield	72	(1)
2005	Newell's Old Boys	10	(0)
2005–2007	Pescara	12	(0)
2007	Nueva Chicago	7	(0)
2007–2009	Chornomorets	40	(0)
2009–2010	Alki Larnaca	15	(0)
2010–2011	Temperley	27	(0)
2011–2012	Leandro N. Alem	15	(0)
2012	Atlético Chascomús	13	(0)
2012–2014	Villa San Carlos	58	(1)
2014–2015	Textil Mandiyú	14	(0)
2015–2016	Cerro Largo	24	(0)

International career
	Argentina U20	2	(0)
- * Club domestic league appearances and goals

Damián Joel Giménez (born February 26, 1982) is an Argentinian football player, who most recently played for Cerro Largo in the Uruguayan Primera División. He also holds an Italian passport. Giménez is a left-sided defender, but can also operate in midfield.

== Club career ==
Most of his early career Giménez spent with Banfield in Argentina. In 2005, he played in the Copa Libertadores with Banfield. The club reached the quarterfinals of that tournament, losing 3–4 to River Plate on aggregate. He has also spent two seasons playing in Italy with Pescara in Serie B. After spending the first year in Italy, Giménez moved back to Argentina due to family problems. He returned for the following season but had lost his starting spot. On February 7, 2007, he moved to Nueva Chicago to play in the Torneo Clausura of the Primera División Argentina. The team finished in 15th place and was relegated to Primera B Nacional Argentina. Because of the relegation he was available on a free transfer. In July 2007 he underwent a trial at Heart of Midlothian F.C. in Scotland. He impressed the Hearts staff on their pre-season tour of Austria, and was offered a one-year contract, but failed to agree personal terms. Later the same summer he had a trial with Bristol City F.C. While on tour in Latvia with Bristol City F.C. he broke his nose during a match. On August 1, 2007, he signed with the Ukrainian side Chornomorets.

On 18 December 2009, Alki announced the signing of Damian Gimenez until the end of the season.

== National team ==
Giménez has been capped at the U20 level, and has been called up to train with the senior team. He has 15 caps for the U20 team, but, so far, no official matches at the senior level. He just missed making the U20 squad, which went on to win a gold medal at the 2001 FIFA World Youth Championship.
