= Gianluca Simeone =

Argentine footballer (born 1998)

Personal information
- Full name: Gianluca Simeone Baldini
- Date of birth: 23 July 1998 (age 28)
- Place of birth: Buenos Aires, Argentina
- Height: 1.84 m (6 ft 0 in)
- Position: Centre-forward

Youth career
- River Plate
- → Frosinone (loan)

Senior career*
Years	Team	Apps	(Gls)
2018–2019	River Plate	0	(0)
2018	→ Unión La Calera (loan)	0	(0)
2019–2020	Gimnasia y Esgrima	1	(0)
2019–2020	→ Ibiza (loan)	0	(0)
2019–2020	→ Sant Rafel (loan)	25	(13)
2020–2022	Ibiza Islas Pitiusas	59	(14)
2022–2023	Xerez Deportivo	30	(4)
2023–2024	Tudelano	33	(9)
2024–2025	Rayo Majadahonda	34	(7)
Total		173	(47)
- * Club domestic league appearances and goals

Gianluca Simeone (Italian: [dʒanˈluːka simeˈoːne]; born 23 July 1998) is an Argentine former professional footballer who played as a centre-forward.

== Career ==
Simeone began his career with River Plate, where he had a loan stint away with Frosinone. He was loaned out in 2018 to Chilean Primera División side Unión La Calera, with the forward making his senior debut on 20 June during a Copa Chile second round win over Magallanes. Simeone made two further appearances in the next round against Palestino, who were the eventual winners. He returned to River Plate without featuring in the league, though was an unused sub three times. In 2019, Simeone joined Argentine Primera División team Gimnasia y Esgrima. His debut versus Atlético Tucumán came soon after.

On 13 August 2019, Simeone was signed on loan by Segunda División B outfit UD Ibiza. He was, however, immediately moved to their reserve team, Sant Rafel, in the Tercera División. He scored on his second Sant Rafel appearance versus Formentera on 1 September. His first senior hat-trick arrived on 22 February 2020 against Santanyí. The centre-forward departed back to Gimnasia at the end of 2019–20, having scored thirteen goals in twenty-five matches. In August 2020, Simeone returned to Spain with Tercera División side CD Ibiza. He netted a hat-trick in his third game versus Sóller on 1 November.

In the 2022–23 season, Simeone played for Xerez Deportivo, while prior to the 2023–24 season he moved to CD Tudelano.

Simeone retired after ending the 2024–25 Segunda Federación with Rayo Majadahonda.

== Post-retirement ==
Following his retirement, Simeone became a football agent.

== Personal life ==
Simeone is the son of football manager Diego Simeone. His brothers Giovanni and Giuliano are also more accomplished professional footballers.

== Career statistics ==
As of match played 14 May 2025

Appearances and goals by club, season and competition
Club	Season	League			National cup (Note: Includes Copa Chile, Copa Argentina, Copa del Rey)		Total	
Club	Season	Division	Apps	Goals	Apps	Goals	Apps	Goals
River Plate	2018–19	Argentine Primera División	0	0	0	0	0	0
Unión La Calera (loan)	2018	Chilean Primera División	0	0	3	0	3	0
Gimnasia y Esgrima	2018–19	Argentine Primera División	1	0	1	0	2	0
Gimnasia y Esgrima	2019–20	Argentine Primera División	0	0	0	0	0	0
Gimnasia y Esgrima	Total		1	0	1	0	2	0
Ibiza (loan)	2019–20	Segunda División B	0	0	0	0	0	0
Sant Rafel (loan)	2019–20	Tercera División	25	13	0	0	25	13
Ibiza Islas Pitiusas	2020–21	Tercera División	25	10	1	0	26	10
Ibiza Islas Pitiusas	2021–22	Segunda División RFEF	34	4	1	0	35	4
Ibiza Islas Pitiusas	Total		59	14	2	0	61	14
Xerez Deportivo	2022–23	Segunda Federación	29	4	0	0	29	4
Tudelano	2023–24	Segunda Federación	33	9	2	0	35	9
Rayo Majadahonda	2024–25	Segunda Federación	34	7	0	0	34	7
Career total			181	47	8	0	189	47
