= Hernán Tifner =

Argentine footballer

Personal information
- Date of birth: 20 September 1996 (age 30)
- Place of birth: Córdoba, Argentina
- Height: 1.75 m (5 ft 9 in)
- Position: Midfielder

Team information
- Current team: Huracán Las Heras

Youth career
- Estudiantes
- 2018: Gimnasia LP

Senior career*
Years	Team	Apps	(Gls)
2018–2020	Gimnasia LP	3	(0)
2019–2020	→ Huracán Las Heras (loan)	18	(0)
2020–2021	Mitre	15	(0)
2022	Independiente de Chivilcoy	7	(0)
2022	Deportivo Camioneros	10	(0)
2023–	Huracán Las Heras	3	(0)
- * Club domestic league appearances and goals as of 17:31, 8 April 2023 (UTC)

Hernán Tifner (born 20 September 1996) is an Argentine professional footballer who plays as a midfielder for Huracán Las Heras.

== Career ==
Tifner had a youth spell with Estudiantes, prior to joining Gimnasia y Esgrima in 2018. His debut in professional league football arrived on 11 August during the club's 2018–19 opener against Argentinos Juniors - he had previously appeared in Copa Argentina fixtures with Sportivo Belgrano on 21 July and Olimpo on 29 July. In July 2019, Tifner departed on loan to Huracán Las Heras of Torneo Federal A. His first match arrived on 1 September against Juventud Unida Universitario, which preceded a further nineteen appearances in all competitions across 2019–20. He returned to Gimnasia in June 2020.

Tifner terminated his contract with Gimnasia in late August 2020, subsequently joining up with former manager Darío Ortiz at Mitre.

== Personal life ==
In February 2019, Tifner was suspended from the professional squad of Gimnasia y Esgrima by manager Pedro Troglio after a complaint of gender violence was made against the player by an ex-girlfriend. He was reintegrated back into the club in the succeeding April. An agreement between him and his former partner was later reached, with Tifner referring to the original incident as "a mistake".

== Career statistics ==
As of 2 September 2020.

Club statistics
Club	Season	League			Cup		League Cup		Continental		Other		Total	
Club	Season	Division	Apps	Goals	Apps	Goals	Apps	Goals	Apps	Goals	Apps	Goals	Apps	Goals
Gimnasia y Esgrima	2018–19	Primera División	3	0	2	0	0	0	—		0	0	5	0
Gimnasia y Esgrima	2019–20	Primera División	0	0	0	0	0	0	—		0	0	0	0
Gimnasia y Esgrima	Total		3	0	2	0	0	0	—		0	0	5	0
Huracán Las Heras (loan)	2019–20	Torneo Federal A	18	0	2	0	—		—		0	0	20	0
Mitre	2020–21	Primera B Nacional	0	0	0	0	—		—		0	0	0	0
Career total			21	0	4	0	0	0	—		0	0	25	0
