= José Luis Calderón =

Argentine footballer (born 1970)

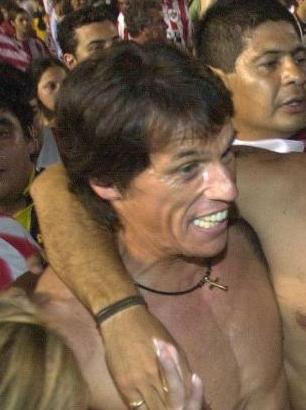
- Calderón in 2006

Personal information
- Date of birth: 24 October 1970 (age 56)
- Place of birth: La Plata, Argentina
- Height: 1.78 m (5 ft 10 in)
- Position: Striker

Youth career
- 1987–1989: Cambaceres

Senior career*
Years	Team	Apps	(Gls)
1989–1991	Cambaceres	83	(43)
1992–1995	Estudiantes LP	118	(52)
1996–1997	Independiente	41	(23)
1997–1998	Napoli	6	(0)
1998–2000	Independiente	64	(28)
2000–2001	América	40	(8)
2001–2003	Atlas	65	(28)
2003	Independiente	7	(0)
2004–2005	Arsenal de Sarandí	52	(20)
2005–2007	Estudiantes LP	65	(26)
2007–2008	Arsenal de Sarandí	32	(9)
2008–2009	Estudiantes LP	34	(5)
2010	Argentinos Juniors	17	(3)
2010	Cambaceres	1	(1)
Total		625	(244)

International career
1997–1999	Argentina	5	(0)
- * Club domestic league appearances and goals

José Luis Calderón (born 24 October 1970) is an Argentine former professional footballer who played as a striker. He played for 17 years between 1989 and 2006 without winning a trophy, but between the ages of 36 and 39 he won four major championships with three teams.

Nicknamed Caldera, he is remembered for a 48-metre goal he scored against Boca Juniors in 1999 and for his hat-trick against Estudiantes' derby rivals Gimnasia y Esgrima La Plata on 15 October 2006. He retired in 2010, at almost 40 years of age.

== Club career ==
After a promising spell in the youth system of Defensores de Cambaceres, he was transferred to Estudiantes de La Plata, the team he supported as a child, in 1992. His scoring helped the team return from relegation in 1994. Later, he played for Independiente for a year and Italian side S.S.C. Napoli during the 1997–98 season. He returned to Independiente for two years and then moved to Mexico to play with América and Atlas.

Calderón has had multiple spells with Estudiantes, Independiente and Arsenal de Sarandí. He did not win any major honours until late in his career, winning the 2006 Apertura with Estudiantes and the 2007 Copa Sudamericana with Arsenal.

In July 2008 he rejoined Estudiantes for the third time in his career. He was runner-up with the team in the 2008 Copa Sudamericana, and was part of the squad that won the 2009 Copa Libertadores, where he was used exclusively as a substitute.

On 25 November 2009, Calderón announced his retirement from professional football at the age of 39. He explained that his decision came after coach Alejandro Sabella informed him that he was not being considered for the 2009 FIFA Club World Cup. Sabella denied that this was indeed the case.

On 4 January 2010, Calderón announced that Argentinos Juniors coach Claudio Borghi convinced him to return to football, after a brief retirement from the game. In an article, Calderón stated, "El Bichi (Borghi) has given me the chance to retire from within a football field". He agreed to play for Argentinos for six months and then possibly retire.

Calderón was one of the key players in the Argentinos' team that won the 2010 Clausura championship. He played in 18 of the club's 19 games and scored 3 goals during their championship-winning campaign. He also assisted Matías Caruzzo in a vital 93rd-minute winner goal against Independiente in the penultimate fixture of the campaign.

After winning the 2010 Clausura, Calderón played one last professional game with his first team, Defensores de Cambaceres, in which he scored one last goal from a penalty kick.

== International career ==
Calderón only had a brief interlude with the Argentina national team. He played in the 1999 Copa América, but a fight with the then coach Marcelo Bielsa diminished his chances of ever playing for the national team again.

== Personal life ==
Calderón's son Lucas is a professional footballer.

== Honours ==
Estudiantes LP

- Primera División: 2006 Apertura
- Copa Libertadores: 2009

Arsenal de Sarandí

- Copa Sudamericana: 2007

Argentinos Juniors

- Primera División: 2010 Clausura

Individual

- Argentine Primera División top scorer: 1995 Apertura, 1999 Clausura
- Copa Libertadores top scorer: 2006
