= Matías Noble =

Argentine footballer

Personal information
- Full name: Matías Jesús Noble
- Date of birth: 9 August 1996 (age 30)
- Place of birth: Berisso, Argentina
- Height: 1.82 m (5 ft 11 1/2 in)
- Position: Midfielder

Team information
- Current team: Chaco For Ever

Youth career
- 2007–2015: Gimnasia LP

Senior career*
Years	Team	Apps	(Gls)
2015–2018	Gimnasia LP	18	(0)
2018–2020	Quilmes	21	(0)
2020–2022	Brown de Adrogué	65	(4)
2023–2024	Real Tomayapo	44	(8)
2024–2025	Melgar	7	(1)
2025–2026	Gimnasia Jujuy	17	(1)
2026–	Chaco For Ever	3	(0)
- * Club domestic league appearances and goals as of 18:02, 24 April 2026 (UTC)

Matías Jesús Noble (born 9 August 1996) is an Argentine professional footballer who plays as a midfielder for Chaco For Ever.

== Career ==
Noble started his youth career with Gimnasia y Esgrima in 2007, making the step into senior football in 2015. He was an unused substitute for Argentine Primera División matches against Tigre and Rosario Central in August 2015, prior to making his senior debut on 5 February 2016 in a defeat to Banfield. Twelve more appearances followed in 2016 which ended with serious injury, before Noble played four times in 2016–17. On 30 June 2018, Noble completed move to Quilmes of Primera B Nacional. After two years at Quilmes, Noble moved to fellow league club Brown de Adrogué in October 2020.

== Career statistics ==
As of 8 September 2018.

Club statistics
Club	Season	League			Cup (Note: Includes the Copa Argentina)		League Cup		Continental (Note: Includes the Copa Sudamericana)		Other		Total	
Club	Season	Division	Apps	Goals	Apps	Goals	Apps	Goals	Apps	Goals	Apps	Goals	Apps	Goals
Gimnasia y Esgrima	2015	Primera División	0	0	0	0	—		—		0	0	0	0
Gimnasia y Esgrima	2016	Primera División	13	0	0	0	—		—		0	0	13	0
Gimnasia y Esgrima	2016–17	Primera División	4	0	1	0	—		0	0	0	0	5	0
Gimnasia y Esgrima	2017–18	Primera División	1	0	0	0	—		—		0	0	1	0
Gimnasia y Esgrima	Total		18	0	1	0	—		0	0	0	0	19	0
Quilmes	2018–19	Primera B Nacional	2	0	0	0	—		—		0	0	2	0
Career total			20	0	1	0	—		0	0	0	0	21	0
