= Agustín Bolívar =

Argentine footballer

Personal information
- Full name: Agustín Gabriel Bolívar
- Date of birth: 9 January 1996 (age 30)
- Place of birth: Ensenada, Argentina
- Height: 1.73 m (5 ft 8 in)
- Position: Midfielder

Team information
- Current team: Quilmes

Youth career
- 2006–2017: Gimnasia LP

Senior career*
Years	Team	Apps	(Gls)
2017–2025	Gimnasia LP	55	(0)
2020	→ Guillermo Brown (loan)	6	(0)
2020–2021	→ Atlanta (loan)	35	(0)
2022	→ Almagro (loan)	27	(0)
2025–2026	Alvarado	32	(1)
2026–	Quilmes	6	(0)
- * Club domestic league appearances and goals as of 17:32, 18 April 2026 (UTC)

Agustín Gabriel Bolívar (born 9 January 1996) is an Argentine professional footballer who plays as a midfielder for Quilmes.

== Career ==
Bolívar was promoted into the senior squad of Gimnasia y Esgrima during the 2017–18 Argentine Primera División season. He was selected for his professional debut by manager Mariano Soso on 26 August 2017, with Bolívar being substituted on for the final ten minutes of a 4–4 draw away to Defensa y Justicia. Fourteen further appearances followed for Bolívar in his maiden season. Midway through 2019–20, Bolívar was loaned to Primera B Nacional's Guillermo Brown.

On 12 August 2020, Bolívar joined Club Atlético Atlanta on loan until the end of 2021. For the 2022 season, Bolívar was loaned out to Club Almagro.

After 19 years at Gimnasia, Bolívar left permanently to join Primera Nacional club Alvarado in January 2025.

== Career statistics ==
As of 23 June 2020.

Club statistics
Club	Season	League			Cup (Note: Includes the Copa Argentina)		League Cup		Continental		Other		Total	
Club	Season	Division	Apps	Goals	Apps	Goals	Apps	Goals	Apps	Goals	Apps	Goals	Apps	Goals
Gimnasia y Esgrima	2017–18	Primera División	15	0	0	0	—		—		0	0	15	0
Gimnasia y Esgrima	2018–19	Primera División	3	0	0	0	4	0	—		0	0	7	0
Gimnasia y Esgrima	2019–20	Primera División	3	0	0	0	0	0	—		0	0	3	0
Gimnasia y Esgrima	Total		21	0	0	0	4	0	—		0	0	25	0
Guillermo Brown (loan)	2019–20	Primera B Nacional	6	0	0	0	—		—		0	0	6	0
Career total			27	0	0	0	4	0	—		0	0	31	0
