= Patricio Monti =

Argentine footballer

Personal information
- Full name: Patricio Iván Monti
- Date of birth: 15 January 1998 (age 28)
- Place of birth: Argentina
- Height: 1.76 m (5 ft 9 in)
- Position: Midfielder

Youth career
- Gimnasia LP

Senior career*
Years	Team	Apps	(Gls)
2018–2021	Gimnasia LP	6	(0)
2021	Estudiantes RC	6	(0)
- * Club domestic league appearances and goals as of 20:36, 4 April 2022 (UTC)

Patricio Iván Monti (born 15 January 1998) is an Argentine professional footballer who plays as a midfielder.

== Career ==
Monti's career got underway in Gimnasia y Esgrima's academy. He was promoted into first-team football in May 2018 for a match against Independiente, making his professional debut by coming on as a substitute for Matías Gómez in the sixty-sixth minute. That was his only appearance in the 2017–18 season, although he was an unused substitute on two further occasions.

== Career statistics ==
As of 3 December 2018.

Club statistics
Club	Season	League			Cup (Note: Includes the Copa Argentina)		League Cup		Continental		Other		Total	
Club	Season	Division	Apps	Goals	Apps	Goals	Apps	Goals	Apps	Goals	Apps	Goals	Apps	Goals
Gimnasia y Esgrima	2017–18	Primera División	1	0	0	0	—		—		0	0	1	0
Gimnasia y Esgrima	2018–19	Primera División	1	0	0	0	—		—		0	0	1	0
Career total			2	0	0	0	—		—		0	0	2	0
