= Emanuel Zagert =

Argentine footballer

Personal information
- Full name: Emanuel Alexander Zagert
- Date of birth: 18 September 1995 (age 31)
- Place of birth: Resistencia, Argentina
- Height: 1.78 m (5 ft 10 in)
- Position: Forward

Team information
- Current team: Atlético Bucaramanga

Senior career*
| Years | Team | Apps | (Gls) |
| 2016–2019 | Gimnasia LP | 0 | (0) |
| 2016 | → Estudiantes SL (loan) | 2 | (0) |
| 2017–2018 | → Villa San Carlos (loan) | 25 | (3) |
| 2019–2021 | San Telmo | 24 | (4) |
| 2021 | Comunicaciones | 21 | (4) |
| 2022 | Deportivo Armenio | 7 | (0) |
| 2022 | Acassuso | 5 | (2) |
| 2023 | Villa San Carlos | 19 | (8) |
| 2023 | → Atlético Bucaramanga (loan) | 2 | (1) |
- * Club domestic league appearances and goals as of 19:21, 23 July 2023 (UTC)

Emanuel Alexander Zagert (born 18 September 1995) is an Argentine professional footballer who plays as a forward for Atlético Bucaramanga of the Categoría Primera A of Colombia.

== Career ==
Zagert began his career with Gimnasia y Esgrima of the Argentine Primera División. In 2016, Zagert joined Primera B Nacional side Estudiantes on loan. He made his first appearance on 29 January 2016 during a 2–1 win over Juventud Unida Universitario, coming on as a substitute with Estudiantes a goal down. He returned to Gimnasia y Esgrima in July 2016. A year later, on 19 July 2017, Zagert was loaned to Primera B Metropolitana team Villa San Carlos. He made his debut on 26 September in a defeat to San Miguel, before scoring back-to-back in February 2018 against Tristán Suárez and Barracas Central.

San Telmo completed the signing of Zagert in July 2019. He scored four times in his first nine fixtures.

At the beginning of July 2023, the player who belongs to Villa San Carlos is incorporated by Atlético Bucaramanga of the First Division of the Colombian League. It is going on loan until June 2024 with a purchase option of 200 thousand dollars for 70% of its rights.

== Career statistics ==
As of 11 July 2020.

Club statistics
| Club | Season | League | | | Cup | | League Cup | | Continental | | Other | | Total | |
| Club | Season | Division | Apps | Goals | Apps | Goals | Apps | Goals | Apps | Goals | Apps | Goals | Apps | Goals |
|---|---|---|---|---|---|---|---|---|---|---|---|---|---|---|
| Gimnasia y Esgrima | 2016 | Primera División | 0 | 0 | 0 | 0 | — | | — | | 0 | 0 | 0 | 0 |
| Gimnasia y Esgrima | 2016–17 | Primera División | 0 | 0 | 0 | 0 | — | | 0 | 0 | 0 | 0 | 0 | 0 |
| Gimnasia y Esgrima | 2017–18 | Primera División | 0 | 0 | 0 | 0 | — | | — | | 0 | 0 | 0 | 0 |
| Gimnasia y Esgrima | 2018–19 | Primera División | 0 | 0 | 0 | 0 | — | | — | | 0 | 0 | 0 | 0 |
| Gimnasia y Esgrima | Total | | 0 | 0 | 0 | 0 | — | | 0 | 0 | 0 | 0 | 0 | 0 |
| Estudiantes (loan) | 2016 | Primera B Nacional | 2 | 0 | 0 | 0 | — | | — | | 0 | 0 | 2 | 0 |
| Villa San Carlos (loan) | 2017–18 | Primera B Metropolitana | 25 | 3 | 0 | 0 | — | | — | | 0 | 0 | 25 | 3 |
| San Telmo | 2019–20 | Primera B Metropolitana | 17 | 4 | 0 | 0 | — | | — | | 0 | 0 | 17 | 4 |
| Career total | | | 44 | 7 | 0 | 0 | — | | 0 | 0 | 0 | 0 | 44 | 7 |
