= Leandro Contín =

Argentine footballer

Personal information
- Full name: Leandro Nicolás Contín
- Date of birth: 7 December 1995 (age 30)
- Place of birth: Caá Catí, Argentina
- Height: 1.83 m (6 ft 0 in)
- Position: Forward

Team information
- Current team: Gimnasia y Tiro

Youth career
- Club Sol Naciente
- 2013–2014: Gimnasia LP

Senior career*
Years	Team	Apps	(Gls)
2014–2023	Gimnasia LP	82	(12)
2018–2019	→ Gimnasia Jujuy (loan)	21	(4)
2023–2024	Sport Boys	17	(2)
2024–2025	Tigre	20	(1)
2025–	Gimnasia y Tiro	46	(6)
- * Club domestic league appearances and goals as of 18:10, 28 April 2026 (UTC)

Leandro Nicolás Contín (born 7 December 1995) is an Argentine professional footballer who plays as a forward for Gimnasia y Tiro.

== Career ==
Contín had a youth spell with Club Sol Naciente, before joining Argentine Primera División side Gimnasia y Esgrima (LP) in 2013. He was an unused substitute twice during the 2014 Argentine Primera División campaign for matches against Defensa y Justicia and San Lorenzo. Two seasons later, in 2016, Contín made his professional debut in a home win against Quilmes on 4 April 2016. Another appearance came versus Belgrano on 10 April, prior to Contín scoring his first senior goal against Rosario Central on 2 May. During 2016 and 2016–17, Contín scored three goals in thirteen matches.

In July 2018, Contín was loaned to the club's namesake Gimnasia y Esgrima (J) of Primera B Nacional. He scored goals against Arsenal de Sarandí, Instituto, Los Andes and Villa Dálmine across twenty-two appearances for the club.

== Career statistics ==
As of 26 September 2020.

Club statistics
Club	Season	League			Cup		League Cup		Continental		Other		Total	
Club	Season	Division	Apps	Goals	Apps	Goals	Apps	Goals	Apps	Goals	Apps	Goals	Apps	Goals
Gimnasia y Esgrima (LP)	2014	Primera División	0	0	0	0	—		0	0	0	0	0	0
Gimnasia y Esgrima (LP)	2015	Primera División	0	0	0	0	—		—		0	0	0	0
Gimnasia y Esgrima (LP)	2016	Primera División	4	1	1	1	—		—		0	0	5	2
Gimnasia y Esgrima (LP)	2016–17	Primera División	6	1	1	0	—		1 (Note: Appearance(s) in the Copa Libertadores)	0	0	0	8	1
Gimnasia y Esgrima (LP)	2017–18	Primera División	6	0	0	0	—		—		0	0	6	0
Gimnasia y Esgrima (LP)	2018–19	Primera División	0	0	0	0	0	0	—		0	0	0	0
Gimnasia y Esgrima (LP)	2019–20	Primera División	15	4	1	0	1	0	—		0	0	17	4
Gimnasia y Esgrima (LP)	Total		31	6	3	1	1	0	1	0	0	0	36	7
Gimnasia y Esgrima (J)	2018–19	Primera B Nacional	21	4	1	0	—		0	0	0	0	22	4
Career total			52	10	4	1	1	0	1	0	0	0	58	11
