= Matías García (footballer, born 1991) =

Argentine footballer

Personal information
- Full name: Ariel Matías García
- Date of birth: 22 October 1991 (age 35)
- Place of birth: Bell Ville, Argentina
- Height: 1.74 m (5 ft 9 in)
- Position: Midfielder

Team information
- Current team: San Martín Tucumán

Senior career*
Years	Team	Apps	(Gls)
2011–2016	Gimnasia de La Plata	85	(6)
2016–2019	San Martín Tucumán	91	(10)
2019–2020	Gimnasia de La Plata	28	(8)
2021–2022	Juárez	58	(3)
2023–2024	Belgrano	30	(1)
2024–2025	San Martín Tucumán	22	(3)
2025–2026	Aldosivi	8	(0)
2026–	San Martín Tucumán	2	(0)
- * Club domestic league appearances and goals as of 17:59, 9 March 2026 (UTC)

Ariel Matías García (born 22 October 1991) is an Argentine footballer who plays as a midfielder for San Martín Tucumán.
