= Nicolás Ortiz (footballer, born 1995) =

Argentine footballer

Personal information
- Full name: Nicolás Darío Ortiz
- Date of birth: 4 March 1995 (age 31)
- Place of birth: Guaymallén, Argentina
- Height: 1.88 m (6 ft 2 in)
- Position: Centre-back

Team information
- Current team: Deportivo Madryn

Youth career
- Gimnasia LP

Senior career*
Years	Team	Apps	(Gls)
2016–2018	Gimnasia LP	1	(1)
2016	→ Sportivo Estudiantes (loan)	12	(0)
2018	→ Quilmes (loan)	9	(0)
2019	Olmedo	18	(2)
2020–2022	UT Cajamarca	75	(3)
2022–2025	Alvarado	64	(6)
2025–2026	Estudiantes BA	33	(0)
2026–	Deportivo Madryn	10	(1)
- * Club domestic league appearances and goals as of 16:34, 27 April 2026 (UTC)

Nicolás Darío Ortiz (born 4 March 1995) is an Argentine professional footballer who plays as a centre-back for Deportivo Madryn.

== Career ==
Ortiz began with Gimnasia y Esgrima of the Argentine Primera División. In January 2016, Ortiz was loaned to Primera B Nacional team Estudiantes. He made his professional debut on 3 April in a win against Atlético Paraná, coming on as a substitute at 1–1. He featured seven more times in 2016, before playing four times in the following campaign of 2016–17. He returned to Gimnasia y Esgrima in January 2017 and appeared on the club's first-team bench on 27 May against Colón but was unused. In May 2018, Ortiz scored on his debut versus Newell's Old Boys; father Darío was caretaker manager.

On 20 June, Primera B Nacional's Quilmes loaned Ortiz; having renewed his contract with Gimnasia y Esgrima until 2020. Nine appearances followed for Quilmes before he went back to his parent club, who loaned him out to Ecuadorian Serie A side Olmedo on 16 January 2019. Like with Gimnasia y Esgrima, Ortiz netted on his bow for Olmedo in a 3–2 defeat to L.D.U. Quito on 9 February. He scored one further time, versus Independiente del Valle, in eighteen games for the Ecuadorian team. In January 2020, Ortiz moved to Peru with UT Cajamarca.

After one year in UT Cajamarca, Ortiz signed for CA Alvarado in the Primera B Nacional. He made his debut for Alvarado in the 45th minute of a match against Patronato, which they lost 6–0. Ortiz played 64 games and scored 6 goals Alvarado in a span of two seasons.

Estudiantes announced his signing on Instagram on January 8th, 2025.

== Personal life ==
Nicolás Ortiz is the son of former professional footballer Darío Ortiz.

== Career statistics ==
As of 13 March 2020.

Club statistics
Club	Season	League			Cup		Continental		Other		Total	
Club	Season	Division	Apps	Goals	Apps	Goals	Apps	Goals	Apps	Goals	Apps	Goals
Gimnasia y Esgrima	2016	Argentine Primera División	0	0	0	0	—		0	0	0	0
Gimnasia y Esgrima	2016–17	Argentine Primera División	0	0	0	0	0	0	0	0	0	0
Gimnasia y Esgrima	2017–18	Argentine Primera División	1	1	0	0	—		0	0	1	1
Gimnasia y Esgrima	Total		1	1	0	0	0	0	0	0	1	1
Estudiantes (loan)	2016	Primera B Nacional	8	0	0	0	—		0	0	8	0
Estudiantes (loan)	2016–17	Primera B Nacional	4	0	1	0	—		0	0	5	0
Estudiantes (loan)	Total		12	0	1	0	—		0	0	13	0
Quilmes (loan)	2018–19	Primera B Nacional	9	0	0	0	—		0	0	9	0
Olmedo (loan)	2019	Serie A	18	2	0	0	—		0	0	18	2
UT Cajamarca (loan)	2020	Peruvian Primera División	5	0	0	0	—		0	0	5	0
Career total			45	3	1	0	0	0	0	0	46	3
