= Jesús Vargas (footballer) =

Venezuelan footballer (born 1999)

Personal information
- Full name: Jesús Armando Vargas Rojas
- Date of birth: 26 August 1999 (age 27)
- Place of birth: Mérida, Venezuela
- Height: 1.68 m (5 ft 6 in)
- Position: Winger

Team information
- Current team: Deportivo La Guaira
- Number: 11

Senior career*
Years	Team	Apps	(Gls)
2016–2022	Estudiantes de Mérida	88	(13)
2019–2020	→ Gimnasia (loan)	8	(0)
2021	→ Cancún (loan)	13	(1)
2023	Envigado	20	(1)
2024	Universidad Central	20	(3)
2025	Anzoátegui	2	(0)
2026-	Deportivo La Guaira	2	(0)

International career
2019–	Venezuela U20	5	(2)
- * Club domestic league appearances and goals as of 10 March 2026

Jesús Armando Vargas Rojas (born 26 August 1999) is a Venezuelan professional footballer who plays as a winger for Deportivo La Guaira.

== Club career ==
Vargas joined Argentinian side Gimnasia in January 2019 on an 18-month loan deal.

== Career statistics ==
=== Club ===
As of 30 January 2019.

Club	Season	League			Cup		Continental		Other		Total	
Club	Season	Division	Apps	Goals	Apps	Goals	Apps	Goals	Apps	Goals	Apps	Goals
Estudiantes de Mérida	2016	Venezuelan Primera División	6	0	0	0	–		0	0	6	0
Estudiantes de Mérida	2017	Venezuelan Primera División	31	5	1 (Note: Appearances in the Copa Venezuela)	0	–		0	0	32	5
Estudiantes de Mérida	2018	Venezuelan Primera División	22	2	0	0	2 (Note: Appearances in the Copa Sudamericana)	0	0	0	24	2
Career total			59	7	1	0	2	0	0	0	62	7
