= Daian García =

Argentine footballer

Personal information
- Full name: Daian Alberto García
- Date of birth: 15 February 1997 (age 29)
- Place of birth: Concordia, Argentina
- Height: 1.70 m (5 ft 7 in)
- Position: Right winger

Youth career
- Libertad de Concordia
- 2014–2018: Gimnasia LP

Senior career*
Years	Team	Apps	(Gls)
2018–2020	Gimnasia LP	1	(0)
2019–2020	→ Huracán Las Heras (loan)	20	(2)
2020–2021	Cipolletti	8	(0)
2021	Huracán Las Heras	7	(0)
2021–2022	Rivadavia	14	(3)
2022	Atlético Paraná	22	(0)
- * Club domestic league appearances and goals as of 19:13, 2 June 2023 (UTC)

Daian Alberto García (born 15 February 1997) is an Argentine professional footballer who plays as a right winger.

== Career ==
García joined the ranks of Gimnasia y Esgrima in 2014, following a stint with local club Libertad de Concordia. Manager Pedro Troglio moved García into his senior team in December 2018, selecting him as a substitute in a league fixture at the Estadio Monumental Antonio Vespucio Liberti against River Plate; he later subbed the forward on for his pro debut, with García playing the final twenty-three minutes as they lost 3–1. García spent the 2019–20 season out on loan with Huracán Las Heras in Torneo Federal A, appearing twenty-two times in all competitions whilst scoring against Olimpo and Ferro Carril Oeste.

== Career statistics ==
As of 8 July 2020.

Club statistics
Club	Season	League			Cup		League Cup		Continental		Other		Total	
Club	Season	Division	Apps	Goals	Apps	Goals	Apps	Goals	Apps	Goals	Apps	Goals	Apps	Goals
Gimnasia y Esgrima	2018–19	Primera División	1	0	0	0	0	0	—		0	0	1	0
Gimnasia y Esgrima	2019–20	Primera División	0	0	0	0	0	0	—		0	0	0	0
Gimnasia y Esgrima	Total		1	0	0	0	0	0	—		0	0	1	0
Huracán Las Heras (loan)	2019–20	Torneo Federal A	20	2	2	0	0	0	—		0	0	22	2
Career total			21	2	2	0	0	0	—		0	0	23	2
