= Diego Nicolaievsky =

Argentine footballer

Personal information
- Full name: Diego Oscar Nicolaievsky
- Date of birth: 20 April 1993 (age 33)
- Place of birth: Argentina
- Position: Winger

Team information
- Current team: Maccabi Herzliya

Youth career
- 2012–2014: Gimnasia La Plata

Senior career*
Years	Team	Apps	(Gls)
2014–2017	Gimnasia La Plata	10	(0)
2016	→ Almagro (loan)	8	(0)
2016–2017	→ Maccabi Herzliya (loan)	29	(1)
2017–2018	G y E Jujuy	3	(0)
2018–2019	Hapoel Bnei Lod	17	(1)
2019	Hapoel Marmorek	14	(0)
2019–2020	Hapoel Acre	12	(0)
2020–2022	Hapoel Marmorek	61	(10)
2022	Hapoel Kfar Shalem	2	(1)
2022–	Maccabi Herzliya	60	(5)
- * Club domestic league appearances and goals as of 15 June 2025

Diego Oscar Nicolaievsky (born 20 April 1993) is an Argentine professional footballer who plays for Maccabi Herzliya as a winger.

== Career ==
Nicolaievsky signed for Gimnasia La Plata in 2012, and turned professional in 2014. He made his professional debut later that season. In December 2015, Nicolaievsky conducted negotiations to join Israeli club Hapoel Kiryat Shmona as his Jewish background would have qualified him for Israeli citizenship.

He moved on loan to Club Almagro in January 2016.

On 7 September 2016 signed to Maccabi Herzliya.

== Personal life ==
Nicolaievsky is Jewish.
