= Diego Parini =

Argentine footballer (born 1998)

Personal information
- Date of birth: 16 January 1998 (age 28)
- Place of birth: La Loma, Argentina
- Height: 1.70 m (5 ft 7 in)
- Position: Left midfielder

Team information
- Current team: Vidago FC

Youth career
- 2006–2018: Gimnasia y Esgrima

Senior career*
Years	Team	Apps	(Gls)
2018–2019	Gimnasia y Esgrima	1	(0)
2019–2020	AD Oliveirense	0	(0)
2019–2020	→ GD Mirandês (loan)	7	(3)
2020–	Vidago FC	14	(1)
- * Club domestic league appearances and goals as of 17:46, 14 February 2021 (UTC)

Diego Parini (born 16 January 1998) is an Argentine professional footballer who plays as a left midfielder for Vidago FC.

== Career ==
Parini started his career with Gimnasia y Esgrima, having signed in 2006. He initially saw a first-team teamsheet in July 2018, when manager Pedro Troglio selected the midfielder on the bench for Copa Argentina ties with Sportivo Belgrano and Olimpo; but went unused both times. His professional debut came four months following, with Parini being chosen to start a 3–1 loss to River Plate on 2 December 2018. He didn't appear again in 2018–19, and would depart in June 2019. Parini soon joined Campeonato de Portugal side AD Oliveirense. He was immediately loaned to GD Mirandês of the Bragança FA Division of Honour.

For Mirandês, after months of being ineligible due to registration issues, Parini made his debut on 12 January 2020 against Vila Flor SC. His first goal arrived during his second appearance seven days later versus FC Vinhais, after converting a penalty in an 8–1 away victory. In his third match, Parini scored a brace in a fixture with GD Sendim. Later that year, on 18 August, Parini was signed by Campeonato de Portugal team Vidago FC. He received his first senior red card during a draw with Maria da Fonte on 25 October. Parini scored his first Vidago goal on 15 November in a home loss to Vianense.

== Career statistics ==
As of 14 February 2021.

Club statistics
Club	Season	League			Cup		League Cup		Continental		Other		Total	
Club	Season	Division	Apps	Goals	Apps	Goals	Apps	Goals	Apps	Goals	Apps	Goals	Apps	Goals
Gimnasia y Esgrima	2018–19	Primera División	1	0	0	0	—		—		0	0	1	0
AD Oliveirense	2019–20	Campeonato de Portugal	0	0	0	0	—		—		0	0	0	0
GD Mirandês (loan)	2019–20	Division of Honour	7	3	0	0	—		—		1 (Note: Appearance(s) in the Taça Distrital AFB)	1	8	4
Vidago FC	2020–21	Campeonato de Portugal	14	1	1	0	—		—		0	0	15	1
Career total			22	4	1	0	—		—		1	1	24	5
