= 2017–18 Club de Gimnasia y Esgrima La Plata season =

Gimnasia y Esgrima
2017–18 season
- President: Gabriel Pellegrino
- Manager: Mariano Soso
- Stadium: Estadio Juan Carmelo Zerillo
- Primera División: 20th
- Copa Argentina: Round of 64
- Top goalscorer: League: Nicolás Colazo (4); All: Nicolás Colazo (4)

The 2017–18 season is Gimnasia y Esgrima's 6th consecutive season in the top-flight of Argentine football. The season covers the period from 1 July 2017 to 30 June 2018.

== Current squad ==
As of 5 September 2017.

Note: Flags indicate national team as defined under FIFA eligibility rules; some limited exceptions apply. Players may hold more than one non-FIFA nationality.

No.	Pos.	Nation	Player
3	DF	ARG	Kevin Ceceri
4	DF	ARG	Facundo Oreja
5	MF	ARG	Juan Silva
6	DF	ARG	Ezequiel Bonifacio
8	MF	ARG	Lorenzo Faravelli
10	MF	MEX	Lucas Lobos
12	FW	ARG	Nicolás Mazzola
15	FW	ARG	Eric Ramírez
21	MF	ARG	Fabián Rinaudo
22	FW	ARG	Franco Niell
23	DF	ARG	Maximiliano Coronel
25	DF	ARG	Lucas Licht

No.	Pos.	Nation	Player
28	DF	ARG	Manuel Guanini
30	MF	URU	Brahian Alemán
31	GK	ARG	Alexis Martin
34	MF	ARG	Matías Noble
35	DF	ARG	Nicolás Ortiz
36	FW	ARG	Enzo Martínez
38	MF	ARG	Luciano Perdomo
40	FW	ARG	Leandro Contín
—	FW	ARG	Nicolás Colazo (on loan from Boca Juniors)
—	FW	URU	Nicolás Dibble (on loan from Plaza Colonia)
—	DF	ARG	Oliver Benítez
—	DF	PAR	Omar Alderete (on loan from Cerro Porteño)
—	GK	ARG	Yair Bonnín

=== Out on loan ===
Note: Flags indicate national team as defined under FIFA eligibility rules; some limited exceptions apply. Players may hold more than one non-FIFA nationality.

No.	Pos.	Nation	Player
—	DF	PER	Christian Ramos (at Emelec until 31 December 2017)
—	FW	ARG	Emanuel Zagert (at Villa San Carlos until 30 June 2018)
—	FW	ARG	Horacio Tijanovich (at Defensa y Justicia until 30 June 2018)

== Transfers ==
=== In ===
Date	Pos.	Name	From	Fee
1 July 2017	FW	(Argentina) Nicolás Ibáñez	(Argentina) Comunicaciones	Undisclosed
11 July 2017	MF	(Argentina) Fabián Rinaudo	(Italy) Catania	Undisclosed

=== Out ===
Date	Pos.	Name	To	Fee
5 July 2017	MF	(Argentina) Daniel Imperiale	(Argentina) Tigre	Undisclosed
6 July 2017	DF	(Argentina) Mauricio Romero	(Argentina) Agropecuario	Undisclosed
10 August 2017	MF	(Argentina) Diego Nicolaievsky	(Argentina) Gimnasia y Esgrima (J)	Undisclosed
10 August 2017	MF	(Argentina) Javier Mendoza	(Argentina) Chacarita Juniors	Undisclosed
13 August 2017	MF	(Argentina) Dardo Miloc	(Argentina) Atlético Tucumán	Undisclosed
14 August 2017	MF	(Argentina) Sebastián Romero	(Argentina) Quilmes	Undisclosed
22 August 2017	FW	(Argentina) Pablo Vegetti	(Argentina) Chacarita Juniors	Undisclosed
24 August 2017	MF	(Argentina) Ignacio Jaúregui	(Argentina) Ferro Carril Oeste	Undisclosed

=== Loan in ===
Date from	Date to	Pos.	Name	From
19 July 2017	30 June 2018	FW	(Argentina) Nicolás Colazo	(Argentina) Boca Juniors
2 August 2017	30 June 2018	DF	(Paraguay) Omar Alderete	(Paraguay) Cerro Porteño
23 August 2017	30 June 2018	FW	(Uruguay) Nicolás Dibble	(Uruguay) Plaza Colonia

=== Loan out ===
Date from	Date to	Pos.	Name	To
7 July 2017	30 June 2018	FW	(Argentina) Emanuel Zagert	(Argentina) Villa San Carlos
31 July 2017	30 June 2018	FW	(Argentina) Horacio Tijanovich	(Argentina) Defensa y Justicia

== Friendlies ==
=== Pre-season ===
Win Draw Loss

29 July 2017 Friendly	Gimnasia y Esgrima (Argentina)	2–0	(Argentina) Villa San Carlos	Los Cardales, Argentina
09:00	N. Ibáñez 29'; N. Mazzola 59'	Report		Referee: Alberto Guzmán (Argentina)

3 August 2017 Friendly	Defensa y Justicia (Argentina)	1–1	(Argentina) Gimnasia y Esgrima	Buenos Aires, Argentina
	J. Kaprof	Report	N. Ibáñez	Stadium: Estadio Norberto "Tito" Tomaghello

7 August 2017 Friendly	Gimnasia y Esgrima (Argentina)	2–2	(Argentina) San Martín	Buenos Aires, Argentina
09:00	M. Noble 4'; N. Ibáñez 56'	Report	F. Barceló 30'; C. Luque 44'	Stadium: Unión Tranviarios Automotor de Moreno

7 August 2017 Friendly	Gimnasia y Esgrima (Argentina)	1–1	(Argentina) San Martín	Buenos Aires, Argentina
10:45	B. Alemán 18'	Report	G. Carabajal 4'	Stadium: Unión Tranviarios Automotor de Moreno

12 August 2017 Friendly	Vélez Sarsfield (Argentina)	0–2	(Argentina) Gimnasia y Esgrima	Buenos Aires, Argentina
09:00		Report	B. Alemán; M. Guanini	Stadium: Villa Olímpica Fortín

=== Mid-season ===
2 September 2017 Friendly	Gimnasia y Esgrima (Argentina)	3–0	(Argentina) Villa San Carlos	Buenos Aires, Argentina
	N. Mazzola; N. Dibble; N. Colazo	Report		Stadium: Estadio Juan Carmelo Zerillo

== Primera División ==
=== League table ===
Pos	Team	Pld	W	D	L	GF	GA	GD	Pts
21	Newell's Old Boys (Note: Newell's Old Boys were deducted one point for debts owed to former players. Originally AFA partially accepted the appeal by Newell's Old Boys reducing the penalty from three points to one point but a new appeal by Lanús overturned the decision. Finally, on 28 June 2019 CAS gave back two points to Newell´s Old Boys reducing the penalty to one point again.)	27	8	6	13	23	28	−5	29
22	Lanús	27	6	11	10	20	37	−17	29
23	Gimnasia y Esgrima (LP)	27	7	6	14	28	43	−15	27
24	Tigre	27	4	12	11	26	33	−7	24
25	Temperley	27	5	8	14	22	46	−24	23

Source: AFA
Rules for classification: 1) points; 2) play-off (only if needed to decide championship); 3) goal difference; 4) goals scored; 5) head-to-head points; 6) head-to-head goal difference; 7) head-to-head goals scored.

=== Results by matchday ===
Matchday	1	2	3	4	5	6	7	8	9	10	11	12	13	14	15	16	17	18	19	20	21	22	23	24	25	26	27
Ground	A	A	H	A	H	A	H	A	H	A	H	A	H														
Result	D	L	L	W	L	L	W	L	W	L	W	L															
Position	11	21	23	18	22	22	21	22	20	22	19	20															

Updated to match(es) played on 12 December 2017. Source: Soccerway
A = Away; H = Home; W = Win; D = Draw; L = Loss

26 August 2017 1	Defensa y Justicia (Argentina)	4–4	(Argentina) Gimnasia y Esgrima	Buenos Aires, Argentina
14:05	C. Rius 11'; F. Márquez 23', 52'; G. Castellani 35'	Report	N. Ibáñez 14', 18'; L. Faravelli 41'; F. Niell 84'	Stadium: Estadio Norberto "Tito" Tomaghello; Referee: Facundo Tello (Argentina)

11 September 2017 2	Unión Santa Fe (Argentina)	1–0	(Argentina) Gimnasia y Esgrima	Santa Fe, Argentina
19:05	F. Soldano 21'	Report		Stadium: Estadio 15 de Abril; Referee: Nicolás Lamolina (Argentina)

18 September 2017 3	Gimnasia y Esgrima (Argentina)	1–3	(Argentina) Huracán	Buenos Aires, Argentina
19:05	N. Colazo 63'	Report	R. Ábila 30'; I. Pussetto 58', 90+3'	Stadium: Estadio Juan Carmelo Zerillo; Referee: Silvio Trucco (Argentina)

24 September 2017 4	Olimpo (Argentina)	0–1	(Argentina) Gimnasia y Esgrima	Bahía Blanca, Argentina
14:05		Report	B. Alemán 26'	Stadium: Estadio Roberto Natalio Carminatti; Referee: Darío Herrera (Argentina)

30 September 2017 5	Gimnasia y Esgrima (Argentina)	1–3	(Argentina) Lanús	Buenos Aires, Argentina
18:05	N. Mazzola 71'	Report	J. Sand 2', 45+3' (pen.), 69' (pen.)	Stadium: Estadio Juan Carmelo Zerillo; Referee: Patricio Loustau (Argentina)

15 October 2017 6	Godoy Cruz (Argentina)	3–0	(Argentina) Gimnasia y Esgrima	Mendoza, Argentina
14:05	L. Licht 6' (o.g.); F. Cobos 39'; J. Correa 75'	Report		Stadium: Estadio Malvinas Argentinas; Referee: Silvio Trucco (Argentina)

29 October 2017 7	Gimnasia y Esgrima (Argentina)	4–0	(Argentina) Vélez Sarsfield	Buenos Aires, Argentina
14:05	N. Dibble 6'; N. Mazzola 46'; L. Faravelli 53'; N. Colazo 63'	Report		Stadium: Estadio Juan Carmelo Zerillo; Referee: Andrés Merlos (Argentina)

3 November 2017 8	Chacarita Juniors (Argentina)	2–0	(Argentina) Gimnasia y Esgrima	Villa Maipú, Argentina
19:05	F. Rosso 42'; M. Matos 47'	Report		Stadium: Estadio de Chacarita Juniors; Referee: Jorge Baliño (Argentina)

20 November 2017 9	Gimnasia y Esgrima (Argentina)	2–0	(Argentina) Patronato	Buenos Aires, Argentina
17:00	N. Colazo 36'; N. Mazzola 51'	Report		Stadium: Estadio Juan Carmelo Zerillo; Referee: Diego Abal (Argentina)

25 November 2017 10	Belgrano (Argentina)	2–0	(Argentina) Gimnasia y Esgrima	Córdoba, Argentina
17:00	F. Brener 83'; J. Brunetta 90+4'	Report		Stadium: El Gigante de Alberdi; Referee: Juan Pompei (Argentina)

3 December 2017 11	Gimnasia y Esgrima (Argentina)	2–1	(Argentina) River Plate	Buenos Aires, Argentina
21:30	N. Colazo 52'; B. Alemán 90+2'	Report	I. Scocco 78'	Stadium: Estadio Juan Carmelo Zerillo; Referee: Fernando Espinoza (Argentina)

10 December 2017 12	Racing Club (Argentina)	3–1	(Argentina) Gimnasia y Esgrima	Avellaneda, Argentina
19:15	Li. López 45+1', 72'; L. Martínez 90+3'	Report	B. Alemán 3'	Stadium: Estadio Presidente Juan Domingo Perón; Referee: Diego Abal (Argentina)

January 2018 13	Gimnasia y Esgrima (Argentina)	–	(Argentina) Rosario Central	Buenos Aires, Argentina
		Report		Stadium: Estadio Juan Carmelo Zerillo

== Copa Argentina ==
Win Draw Loss

–
