= Maximiliano Caire =

Argentine footballer

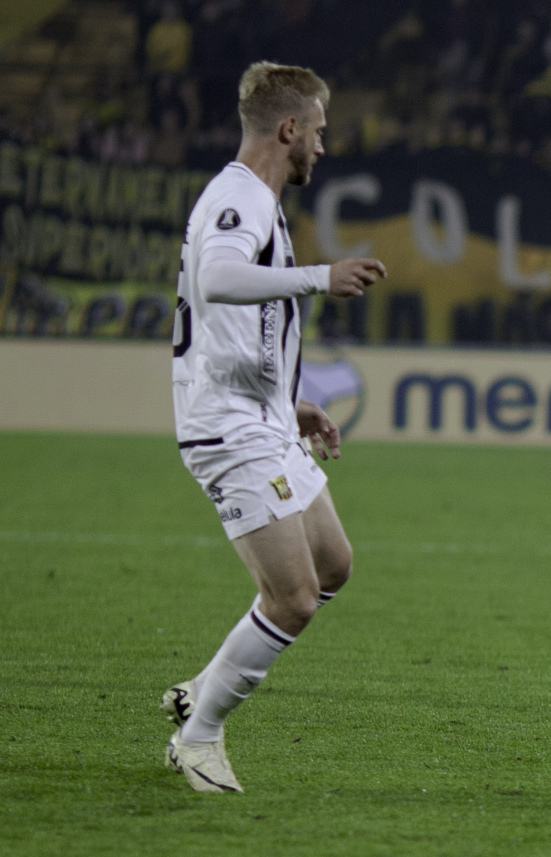

Personal information
- Full name: Maximiliano Caire
- Date of birth: July 12, 1988 (age 38)
- Place of birth: Villa Elisa, Entre Ríos, Argentina
- Height: 1.77 m (5 ft 10 in)
- Positions: Right-back; centre-back

Team information
- Current team: Oriente Petrolero
- Number: 5

Youth career
- Almagro

Senior career*
Years	Team	Apps	(Gls)
2007–2009	Almagro	12	(0)
2008	→ Gimnàstic (loan)	1	(0)
2009–2014	Colón	68	(1)
2014–2015	Patronato	17	(1)
2015–2016	Sarmiento	17	(0)
2016–2017	Vélez Sarsfield	20	(1)
2017–2019	Tigre	23	(1)
2019	Defensa y Justicia	0	(0)
2019–2020	Gimnasia LP	16	(1)
2020–	Oriente Petrolero	25	(2)
- * Club domestic league appearances and goals as of 20:20, 4 April 2022 (UTC)

Maximiliano Caire (born July 12, 1988, in Villa Elisa, Entre Ríos, Argentina) is an Argentine footballer currently playing for Oriente Petrolero of the Bolivian Primera División. Although mainly a right full back, Caire can play in either position of the field, both as a full back or as a winger.

== Club career ==
Caire debuted professionally for Almagro in 2007. In 2008, he was loaned out to Gimnàstic of the Spanish Segunda División B.

In 2009, the full back joined Colón in the Argentine Primera División, debuting in a 0–1 home defeat to Vélez Sarsfield for the first fixture of the 2009 Apertura. His best year in Colón was 2012, in which he played as a regular starter during both the 2012 Clausura and 2012 Inicial tournaments, totaling 34 games and one goal. Caire left Colón after the team's relegation at the end of the 2013–14 Argentine Primera División season.

The Argentine full back had a sixth-month spell playing for Patronato in the Primera B Nacional. Later, he joined recently promoted Sarmiento in the Primera División, helping the team remain in the first division.

For the 2016 Argentine Primera División, Caire joined Vélez Sarsfield on a free transfer.

== International career ==
In 2012, Caire was called by coach Alejandro Sabella for an Argentina national team formed with local league players, to play the Superclásico de las Américas. However, he did not enter the field during the match.
