= Janeiler Rivas =

Colombian footballer (born 1988)

Personal information
- Full name: Janeiler Rivas Palacios
- Date of birth: 18 May 1988 (age 38)
- Place of birth: Bogotá, Colombia
- Height: 1.94 m (6 ft 4 in)
- Position: Centre-back

Team information
- Current team: Santos de Nasca
- Number: 26

Senior career*
Years	Team	Apps	(Gls)
2008	Cerro	5	(0)
2009	Basáñez		
2009–2010	Club Atlántida		
2010–2011	Villa Teresa	28	(3)
2011–2012	Boyacá Chicó	16	(1)
2013–2014	Atlético Huila	12	(0)
2014–2017	Alianza Atlético	71	(7)
2017–2018	Millonarios	17	(1)
2019	NorthEast United	4	(0)
2019	Gimnasia	1	(0)
2020	Carlos Stein	18	(2)
2021–	Santos de Nasca	4	(1)
- * Club domestic league appearances and goals as of 17:19, 17 June 2021 (UTC)

Janeiler Rivas Palacios (born 18 May 1988) is a Colombian professional footballer who plays as a centre-back for Santos de Nasca.

== Career ==
In February 2020, Rivas returned to Peru and joined FC Carlos Stein.
