= Ezequiel Bonifacio =

Argentine professional footballer

Personal information
- Full name: Ezequiel Augusto Bonifacio
- Date of birth: 9 May 1994 (age 32)
- Place of birth: Mar del Plata, Argentina
- Height: 1.69 m (5 ft 6 1/2 in)
- Position: Right-back

Team information
- Current team: Independiente Rivadavia
- Number: 36

Senior career*
Years	Team	Apps	(Gls)
2014–2019	Gimnasia LP	79	(4)
2019–2020	Unión de Santa Fe	21	(2)
2020–2021	Club Atlético Huracán	19	(0)
2021–2023	Podbeskidzie Bielsko-Biała	53	(1)
2023–2025	Banfield	22	(0)
2025–	Independiente Rivadavia	23	(0)
- * Club domestic league appearances and goals as of 16:28, 11 July 2026 (UTC)

Ezequiel Augusto Bonifacio (born 9 May 1994) is an Argentine professional footballer who plays as a right-back for Independiente Rivadavia.

== Career ==
Bonifacio began his Gimnasia y Esgrima career in 2014, making his senior professional debut in the Copa Argentina on 25 July during a penalty shoot-out loss to Argentinos Juniors. Just over two weeks later, Bonifacio made his league bow in a 1–1 draw at home to River Plate on 10 August. Nine more appearances followed in all competitions in 2014, including his first match in continental competition as he played the final nineteen minutes in a second stage Copa Sudamericana first leg draw with Estudiantes in September. In the following campaign, 2015, he scored his first goal in a 4–2 win over Argentinos Juniors on 16 August.

== Career statistics ==
As of 8 May 2018.

Club statistics
Club	Season	League			Cup (Note: Includes the Copa Argentina)		League Cup		Continental (Note: Includes the Copa Sudamericana)		Other (Note: Includes the Argentine Primera División play-offs)		Total	
Club	Season	Division	Apps	Goals	Apps	Goals	Apps	Goals	Apps	Goals	Apps	Goals	Apps	Goals
Gimnasia y Esgrima	2014	Primera División	9	0	1	0	—		1 (Note: One appearance in 2014 Copa Sudamericana)	0	0	0	11	0
Gimnasia y Esgrima	2015	Primera División	20	1	3	0	—		—		1 (Note: One appearance in 2015 Argentine Primera División play-offs)	0	24	1
Gimnasia y Esgrima	2016	Primera División	6	0	0	0	—		—		0	0	6	0
Gimnasia y Esgrima	2016–17	Primera División	8	0	1	0	—		0	0	0	0	9	0
Gimnasia y Esgrima	2017–18	Primera División	23	2	0	0	—		—		0	0	23	2
Career total			66	3	5	0	—		1	0	1	0	73	3

== Honours ==
Independiente Rivadavia

- Copa Argentina: 2025
