= Enzo Martínez (footballer, born 1996) =

Argentine footballer (born 1996)

Personal information
- Date of birth: 9 September 1996 (age 30)
- Place of birth: Lincoln, Argentina
- Height: 1.76 m (5 ft 9 1/2 in)
- Position: Midfielder

Team information
- Current team: Almagro

Senior career*
Years	Team	Apps	(Gls)
2013–2015	Rivadavia	0	(0)
2015–2019	Gimnasia y Esgrima	2	(0)
2018	→ Olimpo (loan)	0	(0)
2019–2025	Ferro Carril Oeste	27	(4)
2021–2022	→ Indep. Rivadavia (loan)	25	(3)
2023	→ San Martín Tucumán (loan)	26	(0)
2024	→ Agropecuario (loan)	25	(1)
2025–2026	Alvarado	26	(0)
2026–	Almagro	6	(1)
- * Club domestic league appearances and goals as of 17:04, 22 April 2026 (UTC)

Enzo Martínez (born 9 September 1996) is an Argentine professional footballer who plays as a midfielder for Almagro.

== Career ==
Martínez's first club were Rivadavia. He was called up to the first-team substitutes bench once during his Rivadavia career, as he went unused for the then-Torneo Federal A team in a Copa Argentina tie against Defensores de Belgrano in November 2013. In 2015, Martínez joined Argentine Primera División side Gimnasia y Esgrima. He made his professional debut during 2017 in a Primera División away victory versus Talleres on 16 June 2017. In July 2018, Martínez joined Olimpo of Primera B Nacional on loan. However, the deal was terminated in August following discussions with manager Darío Bonjour.

In July 2019, Martínez headed to Torneo Federal A with Ferro Carril Oeste. He scored his first senior goal on 24 October versus Sol de Mayo. In July 2021, he was loaned out to Independiente Rivadavia until the end of 2021. In November 2021, Martínez torn his ligament in his right knee, which would keep him out for 6–8 months. He continued at Independiente Rivadavia for the 2022 season while recovering.

== Career statistics ==
As of 14 July 2020.

Club statistics
Club	Season	League			Cup		League Cup		Continental		Other		Total	
Club	Season	Division	Apps	Goals	Apps	Goals	Apps	Goals	Apps	Goals	Apps	Goals	Apps	Goals
Rivadavia	2013–14	Torneo Argentino A	0	0	0	0	—		—		0	0	0	0
Rivadavia	2014	Torneo Federal A	0	0	0	0	—		—		0	0	0	0
Rivadavia	Total		0	0	0	0	—		—		0	0	0	0
Gimnasia y Esgrima	2015	Primera División	0	0	0	0	—		—		0	0	0	0
Gimnasia y Esgrima	2016	Primera División	0	0	0	0	—		—		0	0	0	0
Gimnasia y Esgrima	2016–17	Primera División	2	0	0	0	—		0	0	0	0	2	0
Gimnasia y Esgrima	2017–18	Primera División	0	0	0	0	—		—		0	0	0	0
Gimnasia y Esgrima	2018–19	Primera División	0	0	0	0	0	0	—		0	0	0	0
Gimnasia y Esgrima	Total		2	0	0	0	0	0	0	0	0	0	2	0
Olimpo (loan)	2018–19	Primera B Nacional	0	0	0	0	—		—		0	0	0	0
Ferro Carril Oeste	2019–20	Torneo Federal A	18	1	1	0	—		—		0	0	19	1
Career total			20	1	1	0	0	0	0	0	0	0	21	1
