= Maximiliano Comba =

Argentine professional footballer

Personal information
- Full name: Maximiliano Gabriel Comba
- Date of birth: 16 January 1994 (age 32)
- Place of birth: La Cautiva, Argentina
- Height: 1.70 m (5 ft 7 in)
- Position: Winger

Team information
- Current team: Volos
- Number: 8

Youth career
- Estudiantes de General Levalle
- 2006–2009: San Martin de Vicuña Mackenna
- Recreativo Estrellas

Senior career*
Years	Team	Apps	(Gls)
2015	San Martin de Vicuña Mackenna		
2016–2019	Estudiantes RC	58	(14)
2018–2019	→ Gimnasia LP (loan)	15	(2)
2019–2023	Gimnasia LP	20	(0)
2020–2021	→ Estudiantes RC (loan)	10	(0)
2021–2022	→ Newell's Old Boys (loan)	17	(1)
2022	→ Belgrano (loan)	19	(3)
2023–	Volos	98	(12)
- * Club domestic league appearances and goals as of 21:00, 20 September 2026 (UTC)

Maximiliano Gabriel Comba (born 16 January 1994) is an Argentine professional footballer who plays as a winger for Greek Super League club Volos.

== Career ==
Comba had youth career spells with Estudiantes de General Levalle, San Martin de Vicuña Mackenna and Recreativo Estrellas. After his time with the latter, he returned to San Martin to subsequently play in Torneo Federal C. In 2016, Comba joined Torneo Federal B's Estudiantes. He netted seven goals in thirty-one appearances in his debut campaign, which ended with promotion to Torneo Federal A. Eight goals in a further thirty-three fixtures followed, including his final goal of 2017–18 against Defensores de Belgrano in the penultimate round of the promotion play-offs; which Estudiantes lost.

In August 2018, Comba joined Argentine Primera División side Gimnasia La Plata on loan until July 2021, with a purchase option. He made his professional bow on 4 September during a league draw away to San Martín (T). In July 2021, Gimnasia triggered the option and signed him on a permanent deal.

On 21 November 2020, Comba returned to his former club, Estudiantes RC, on a loan deal from Gimnasia La Plata. However, he returned to Gimnasia in February 2021. After returning to Gimnasia, he played a few games for the club, before he was sent out on loan once again at the end of July 2021, this time to Newell's Old Boys until the end of 2022, with a purchase option. In January 2022, the loan spell at Newell's was exchanged for a new loan spell, however, at Belgrano, until the end of 2022.

== Career statistics ==
As of 13 October 2018.

Club statistics
Club	Season	League			Cup (Note: Includes the Copa Argentina)		League Cup		Continental		Other		Total	
Club	Season	Division	Apps	Goals	Apps	Goals	Apps	Goals	Apps	Goals	Apps	Goals	Apps	Goals
Estudiantes	2017–18	Torneo Federal A	27	7	2	0	—		—		4 (Note: Four appearances in the 2017–18 Torneo Federal A play-offs)	1 (Note: One goal in the 2017–18 Torneo Federal A play-offs)	33	8
Estudiantes	2018–19	Torneo Federal A	0	0	0	0	—		—		0	0	0	0
Estudiantes	Total		27	7	2	0	—		—		4	1	33	8
Gimnasia y Esgrima (loan)	2018–19	Primera División	1	0	0	0	—		—		0	0	1	0
Career total			28	7	2	0	—		—		4	1	34	8
