= Maximiliano Coronel =

Argentine footballer

Personal information
- Full name: Maximiliano Ángel Coronel
- Date of birth: April 28, 1989 (age 37)
- Place of birth: Buenos Aires, Argentina
- Height: 1.80 m (5 ft 11 in)
- Position: Centre-back

Team information
- Current team: All Boys

Youth career
- All Boys
- River Plate

Senior career*
Years	Team	Apps	(Gls)
2009–2011	River Plate	14	(0)
2011–2013	All Boys	35	(1)
2013–2022	Gimnasia LP	143	(8)
2022–2023	Cúcuta Deportivo	7	(0)
2023–2024	Deportivo Morón	26	(0)
2024–	All Boys	53	(1)
- * Club domestic league appearances and goals as of 17:35, 25 March 2026 (UTC)

Maximiliano Ángel Coronel (born 28 April 1989 in Buenos Aires) is an Argentine football player, who plays as a centre-back for All Boys in the Primera Nacional.

== Career ==
Coronel made his competitive debut on 19 August 2009, in a 1–2 home defeat to Lanus in Copa Sudamericana 2009. He made his league debut four days later on 23 August 2009, in a 2–0 away defeat to Banfield. During Apertura 2009 tournament Coronel appeared regularly for the first team.
