= Germán Guiffrey =

Argentine footballer

Personal information
- Full name: Germán Leonel Guiffrey
- Date of birth: 31 December 1997 (age 28)
- Place of birth: Concordia, Argentina
- Height: 1.82 m (6 ft 0 in)
- Position: Centre-back

Team information
- Current team: Gimnasia Mendoza
- Number: 16

Youth career
- Club Salto Grande
- Newell's Old Boys
- Gimnasia LP

Senior career*
| Years | Team | Apps | (Gls) |
| 2018–2024 | Gimnasia LP | 71 | (2) |
| 2024–2026 | Audax Italiano | 46 | (3) |
| 2026 | Tigre | 0 | (0) |
| 2026– | Gimnasia Mendoza | 0 | (0) |
- * Club domestic league appearances and goals as of 16:47, 29 July 2026 (UTC)

Germán Leonel Guiffrey (born 31 December 1997) is an Argentine professional footballer who plays as a centre-back for Gimnasia Mendoza.

== Career ==
Guiffrey started his career with Club Salto Grande, prior to spells with Newell's Old Boys and Gimnasia y Esgrima. He made his senior debut for Gimnasia y Esgrima in a Copa Argentina tie with Sportivo Belgrano in July 2018. He was subsequently moved into the club's senior squad during the 2018–19 Argentine Primera División campaign, initially appearing as an unused substitute for games against Talleres, Patronato and Unión Santa Fe. Guiffrey's professional league debut arrived on 27 October 2018 in a fixture with Boca Juniors, he featured for the full duration of a 2–1 win.

In 2024, he moved to Chile and signed with Audax Italiano.

Back to Argentina, Guiffrey joined Tigre on 14 January 2026.

== Career statistics ==
As of 1 November 2018.

Club statistics
| Club | Season | League | | | Cup (Note: Includes the Copa Argentina) | | League Cup | | Continental | | Other | | Total | |
| Club | Season | Division | Apps | Goals | Apps | Goals | Apps | Goals | Apps | Goals | Apps | Goals | Apps | Goals |
|---|---|---|---|---|---|---|---|---|---|---|---|---|---|---|
| Gimnasia y Esgrima | 2018–19 | Primera División | 1 | 0 | 1 | 0 | — | | — | | 0 | 0 | 2 | 0 |
| Career total | | | 1 | 0 | 1 | 0 | — | | — | | 0 | 0 | 2 | 0 |
