= Eric Ramírez (footballer, born 1996) =

Argentine footballer

Personal information
- Full name: Eric Iván Jesús Ramírez
- Date of birth: 21 September 1996 (age 30)
- Place of birth: Concordia, Argentina
- Height: 1.75 m (5 ft 9 in)
- Position: Forward

Team information
- Current team: Unión Santa Fe
- Number: 43

Youth career
- 2003–2010: River Plate
- 2010–2013: Club Salto Grande
- 2013–2015: Gimnasia LP

Senior career*
Years	Team	Apps	(Gls)
2015–2024	Gimnasia LP	153	(23)
2018–2019	→ Quilmes (loan)	8	(0)
2024–2026	Huracán	60	(8)
2026–	Unión Santa Fe	14	(3)
- * Club domestic league appearances and goals as of 17:35, 22 November 2026 (UTC)

Eric Iván Jesús Ramírez (born 21 September 1996) is an Argentine professional footballer who plays as a forward for Unión Santa Fe.

== Career ==
Ramírez had youth spells with River Plate, Club Salto Grande and Gimnasia y Esgrima. He debuted professionally for Gimnasia y Esgrima in the Argentine Primera División during the 2015 campaign, coming on as a late substitute for Antonio Medina in a 2–3 home defeat to former club River Plate on 29 March. One further appearance in 2015 followed eight months later, he again came on as a substitute in a 5–1 play-off win over San Martín on 20 November. Quilmes signed Ramírez on loan in August 2018.

== Personal life ==
Ramírez has a footballing brother in Agustín Ramírez, who also made the breakthrough via Gimnasia y Esgrima's academy.

== Career statistics ==
As of 11 September 2018.

Club statistics
Club	Season	League			Cup (Note: Includes the Copa Argentina)		League Cup		Continental (Note: Includes the Copa Sudamericana)		Other (Note: Includes the Argentine Primera División play-offs)		Total	
Club	Season	Division	Apps	Goals	Apps	Goals	Apps	Goals	Apps	Goals	Apps	Goals	Apps	Goals
Gimnasia y Esgrima	2015	Primera División	1	0	0	0	—		—		1 (Note: One appearance in 2015 Argentine Primera División play-offs)	0	2	0
Gimnasia y Esgrima	2016	Primera División	2	0	0	0	—		—		0	0	2	0
Gimnasia y Esgrima	2016–17	Primera División	7	0	1	0	—		0	0	0	0	8	0
Gimnasia y Esgrima	2017–18	Primera División	13	0	0	0	—		—		0	0	13	0
Gimnasia y Esgrima	2018–19	Primera División	1	0	1	0	—		0	0	0	0	2	0
Gimnasia y Esgrima	Total		24	0	2	0	—		0	0	1	0	27	0
Quilmes (loan)	2018–19	Primera B Nacional	0	0	0	0	—		—		0	0	0	0
Career total			24	0	2	0	—		0	0	1	0	27	0
