= Matías Gómez (footballer, born 1998) =

Argentine footballer (born 1998)

Personal information
- Full name: Matías Marcos Gómez
- Date of birth: 10 August 1998 (age 28)
- Place of birth: La Leonesa, Argentina
- Height: 1.70 m (5 ft 7 in)
- Position: Forward

Team information
- Current team: Deportivo Morón

Youth career
- Gimnasia LP

Senior career*
Years	Team	Apps	(Gls)
2018–2021	Gimnasia LP	30	(1)
2020	→ San Martín T. (loan)	2	(0)
2021–	Deportivo Morón	11	(0)
- * Club domestic league appearances and goals as of 19:07, 14 July 2022 (UTC)

Matías Marcos Gómez (born 10 August 1998) is an Argentine professional footballer who plays as a forward for Deportivo Morón.

== Career ==
Gómez's first senior club became Gimnasia y Esgrima in 2018, when he was promoted into their first-team during the 2017–18 Argentine Primera División season. He was an unused substitute on 6 April during a fixture with Tigre, before receiving his professional debut a week later in a loss at home to Atlético Tucumán. He was selected three further times in his first season with the club. Gómez netted his first goal in a Copa Argentina tie with Olimpo in July, scoring the sole goal of a 1–0 win.

In January 2020, Gómez joined San Martín de Tucumán on loan for the rest of the season. He returned to Gimnasia in June 2020. In February 2021, Gómez signed with Primera Nacional side Deportivo Morón.

== Career statistics ==
As of 5 October 2018.

Club statistics
Club	Season	League			Cup (Note: Includes the Copa Argentina)		League Cup		Continental		Other		Total	
Club	Season	Division	Apps	Goals	Apps	Goals	Apps	Goals	Apps	Goals	Apps	Goals	Apps	Goals
Gimnasia y Esgrima	2017–18	Primera División	4	0	0	0	—		—		0	0	4	0
Gimnasia y Esgrima	2018–19	Primera División	6	0	3	1	—		—		0	0	9	1
Career total			10	0	3	1	—		—		0	0	13	1
