= Facundo Oreja =

Argentine footballer

Personal information
- Full name: Facundo Julián Oreja
- Date of birth: 14 June 1982 (age 44)
- Place of birth: Mar del Plata, Argentina
- Height: 1.69 m (5 ft 6 1/2 in)
- Position: Right-back

Team information
- Current team: Cruz Azul (assistant)

Senior career*
Years	Team	Apps	(Gls)
2002–2008	Aldosivi	151	(2)
2008–2009	Nueva Chicago	33	(1)
2009–2011	San Martín	52	(2)
2011–2012	Ferro Carril Oeste	36	(0)
2012–2019	Gimnasia y Esgrima	196	(3)
2019–2020	Barracas Central	7	(0)

Managerial career
- 2020–2021: Círculo Deportivo
- 2022: Unión La Calera (assistant)
- 2022–2023: Independiente del Valle (assistant)
- 2024–2025: Cruz Azul (assistant)
- 2025: Porto (assistant)
- 2026: Aldosivi (reserves)
- 2026: Aldosivi (caretaker)
- 2026–: Cruz Azul (assistant)
- * Club domestic league appearances and goals

Facundo Julián Oreja (born 14 June 1982) is an Argentine football coach and former player who played as a right-back. He is the current assistant coach of Liga MX club Cruz Azul.

== Career ==
Aldosivi were Oreja's first club, which he played for from 2002 to 2008 and scored two goals in one hundred and fifty-one appearances in Torneo Argentino A and Primera B Nacional. In 2008, Oreja signed for Primera B Metropolitana side Nueva Chicago. He went on to feature thirty-three times and score one goal (vs. Brown) as Nueva Chicago finished 2nd in 2008–09. Further moves to San Martín and Ferro Carril Oeste in Primera B Nacional followed between 2009 and 2012, during which time he made a total of eighty-eight appearances along with two goals. On 5 July 2012, Oreja joined fellow Primera B Nacional side Gimnasia y Esgrima.

He played in thirty-six fixtures in his first season with Gimnasia y Esgrima, 2012–13, which concluded with promotion to the Argentine Primera División. In the Primera División, Oreja featured one hundred and twenty-one times for the club across his first five seasons in Argentina's top-flight. On 23 June 2019, after two hundred and twenty-one appearances for the La Plata club, Oreja agreed to depart by penning a contract with Barracas Central of Primera B Nacional. He left the club by the end of his contract in the summer 2020.

== Career statistics ==
As of 24 June 2019.

Club statistics
Club	Season	League			Cup		League Cup		Continental		Other		Total	
Club	Season	Division	Apps	Goals	Apps	Goals	Apps	Goals	Apps	Goals	Apps	Goals	Apps	Goals
Gimnasia y Esgrima	2012–13	Primera B Nacional	36	0	1	0	—		—		0	0	37	0
Gimnasia y Esgrima	2013–14	Primera División	35	0	0	0	—		—		0	0	35	0
Gimnasia y Esgrima	2014	Primera División	17	1	1	0	—		2 (Note: Appearance(s) in the Copa Sudamericana)	0	0	0	20	1
Gimnasia y Esgrima	2015	Primera División	28	0	2	0	—		—		3 (Note: Appearance(s) in the Primera División play-offs)	0	33	0
Gimnasia y Esgrima	2016	Primera División	16	2	1	0	—		—		0	0	17	2
Gimnasia y Esgrima	2016–17	Primera División	25	0	4	0	—		2	0	0	0	31	0
Gimnasia y Esgrima	2017–18	Primera División	22	0	0	0	—		—		0	0	22	0
Gimnasia y Esgrima	2018–19	Primera División	17	0	4	0	5	0	—		0	0	26	0
Career total			196	3	13	0	5	0	4	0	3	0	221	3
