= Manuel Guanini =

Argentine footballer

Personal information
- Date of birth: 14 February 1996 (age 30)
- Place of birth: La Plata, Argentina
- Height: 1.93 m (6 ft 4 in)
- Position: Centre-back

Team information
- Current team: Gimnasia y Tiro

Youth career
- Gimnasia LP

Senior career*
Years	Team	Apps	(Gls)
2015–2020	Gimnasia LP	67	(1)
2020–2021	Newell's Old Boys	8	(0)
2022	Sarmiento	9	(0)
2023	Aldosivi	22	(1)
2024	Nea Salamis Famagusta	9	(0)
2024	Badalona Futur	15	(1)
2025–	Gimnasia y Tiro	43	(1)
- * Club domestic league appearances and goals as of 18:00, 28 April 2026 (UTC)

Manuel Guanini (born 14 February 1996) is an Argentine footballer who plays for Gimnasia y Tiro.
