= Lucas Licht =

Argentine footballer (born 1981)

Personal information
- Full name: Lucas Matías Licht
- Date of birth: 6 April 1981 (age 45)
- Place of birth: Berisso, Argentina
- Height: 1.74 m (5 ft 9 in)
- Position: Left-back

Team information
- Current team: Talleres RdE (assistant)

Youth career
- Gimnasia LP

Senior career*
Years	Team	Apps	(Gls)
1999–2006	Gimnasia LP	132	(8)
2006–2009	Getafe	70	(1)
2009–2012	Racing Club	56	(1)
2012–2021	Gimnasia LP	201	(22)
2022–2023	Villa San Carlos	65	(15)
2024	Argentino Chacabuco	1	(1)
Total		525	(48)

Managerial career
- 2024: Villa San Carlos
- 2025–: Talleres RdE (assistant)
- * Club domestic league appearances and goals

Lucas Matías Licht (born 6 April 1981) is an Argentine former professional footballer who played as a left-back but also as a left winger.

== Playing career ==
Born in Berisso in the Buenos Aires Province and nicknamed Bochi, Licht grew up in the youth academy of Gimnasia La Plata, initially being deployed as a forward and later as a midfielder and making his professional debut in 2001. For three years, Israeli Premier League club Maccabi Haifa had him on its transfer shortlist due to his Jewish heritage, as he would not count as a foreigner; he eventually joined Maccabi Netanya for a trial, but nothing materialised.

Following another unsuccessful trial in Israel, with Hapoel Ironi Kiryat Shmona, Licht returned to Argentina where he played one last season with Gimnasia. In 2006's Clausura, he struck from 40 meters to score the game's only goal away against Independiente.

Licht joined La Liga side Getafe on 17 July 2006, signing a four-year contract. In his first season, he only appeared in eight games as a backup to Javier Paredes, but became the undisputed starter after the latter joined Real Zaragoza. On 22 December 2007, he scored his only goal for the Madrid outskirts team in a 2–0 away win over Almería, adding eight matches in their quarter-final run in the UEFA Cup.

On 24 November 2009, having been deemed surplus to requirements by manager Míchel – he failed to make a matchday squad in the vast majority of official matches– Licht was released and returned to his country, agreeing to a three-year deal with Racing Club de Avellaneda. He then spent nine seasons at his former employers Gimnasia LP, all but one in the Argentine Primera División; he led his team to promotion in the 2012–13 Primera B Nacional, and in his second spell was coached by Diego Maradona who named him captain, going on to make more than 350 total appearances.

Licht scored Olympic goals for Villa San Carlos in the Primera B Metropolitana in August and October 2022, respectively against Talleres de Remedios de Escalada and Comunicaciones. He returned to football in October 2024, with the 43-year-old joining Argentino de Chacabuco in the Torneo Regional Federal Amateur.

== Coaching career ==
Licht served as manager of Villa San Carlos in the first half of 2024. In March 2025, he joined the technical staff of Martín Rolón at Talleres de Escalada as assistant coach.

== See also ==
- List of select Jewish football (association; soccer) players
