= Darío Ortiz (footballer) =

Argentine footballer and manager

Personal information
- Full name: Hernán Darío Ortiz
- Date of birth: 14 July 1967 (age 59)
- Place of birth: Godoy Cruz, Argentina
- Height: 1.75 m (5 ft 9 in)
- Position: Defender

Team information
- Current team: Mitre (manager)

Senior career*
Years	Team	Apps	(Gls)
1989–1996	Gimnasia y Esgrima	215	(0)
1996–1997	Huracán	36	(1)
1997–1998	Gimnasia y Tiro	22	(0)
1998–1999	Almirante Brown	39	(1)
1999–2001	Independiente Rivadavia	40	(2)

Managerial career
- 2011: Gimnasia y Esgrima
- 2012: Boca Unidos
- 2014–2015: Estudiantes
- 2016–2017: Atlético Paraná
- 2018: Gimnasia y Esgrima (caretaker)
- 2019: Gimnasia y Esgrima
- 2020–: Mitre
- * Club domestic league appearances and goals

Hernán Darío Ortiz (born 14 July 1967) is an Argentine football manager and former professional footballer who played as a defender. He is currently the manager of Mitre.

== Playing career ==
Ortiz's career started in 1989 with Gimnasia y Esgrima. He made his debut in the Argentine Primera División, which was the first of two hundred and fifteen appearances in Argentina's top tier. After seven years with Gimnasia y Esgrima, Ortiz left in 1996 to play for Huracán of the Primera División. He scored one goal in thirty-six matches during 1996–97 which ended with relegation. He remained in the Primera División as he signed for Gimnasia y Tiro but suffered relegation yet again following twenty-two appearances. Ortiz ended his career with moves to Primera B Nacional teams Almirante Brown and Independiente Rivadavia.

== Coaching career ==
Ortiz made his first step into football management in May 2011, as he became manager of former club Gimnasia y Esgrima. He drew his first match in charge against Quilmes. He departed the club in July 2011 as Gimnasia y Esgrima were relegated to Primera B Nacional. On 8 April 2012, Ortiz was appointed Primera B Nacional side Boca Unidos's new manager. He guided them to a fifth-place finish in 2011–12, missing the play-offs by twelve points. He remained until December 2012 when he resigned. June 2014 saw Ortiz become the manager of Estudiantes alongside Pablo Morant in Torneo Federal A.

In his first season, 2014, Estudiantes San Luis won promotion to Primera B Nacional after finishing top of Zone 2. He left Estudiantes in August 2015. Almost a year later, in July 2016, Ortiz was appointed by Primera B Nacional's Atlético Paraná. He was sacked in April 2017 following just six wins in twenty-four games. Ortiz was made the caretaker manager of Gimnasia y Esgrima on 22 April 2018 following the sacking of Facundo Sava. In his final league match of 2017–18, Ortiz won the first match of his caretaker tenure. Gimnasia y Esgrima beat Newell's Old Boys 2–0, with Darío's son Nicolás scoring the opening goal.

Ortiz was replaced by Pedro Troglio on 15 May. However, in the succeeding February he took over from Troglio on a full-time basis following the latter's sacking. Despite successfully avoiding relegation in 2018–19, Ortiz was dismissed within two months of their 2019–20 campaign after a run four losses in five league games. He was replaced by Diego Maradona. In March 2020, Ortiz was announced as the new manager of Primera B Nacional side Mitre.

== Personal life ==
Ortiz is the father of current professional footballer Nicolás Ortiz.

== Managerial statistics ==
As of 9 July 2020.

Managerial record by team and tenure
Team	From	To	Record					Ref
Team	From	To	P	W	D	L	Win %	Ref
Gimnasia y Esgrima	3 May 2011	11 July 2011	10	2	5	3	20.0	
Boca Unidos	8 April 2012	2 December 2012	28	9	7	12	32.1	
Estudiantes de San Luis	11 June 2014	4 August 2015	42	17	14	11	40.5	
Atlético Paraná	13 July 2016	3 April 2017	24	6	7	11	25.0	
Gimnasia y Esgrima (caretaker)	22 April 2018	15 May 2018	3	1	2	0	33.3	
Gimnasia y Esgrima	18 February 2019	2 September 2019	19	6	5	8	31.6	
Mitre	9 March 2020	present	2	0	2	0	0.0	
Total			127	41	41	45	32.3	—

== Honours ==
Gimnasia y Esgrima

- Copa Centenario de la AFA: 1994
