= Alexis Martín Arias =

Argentine footballer

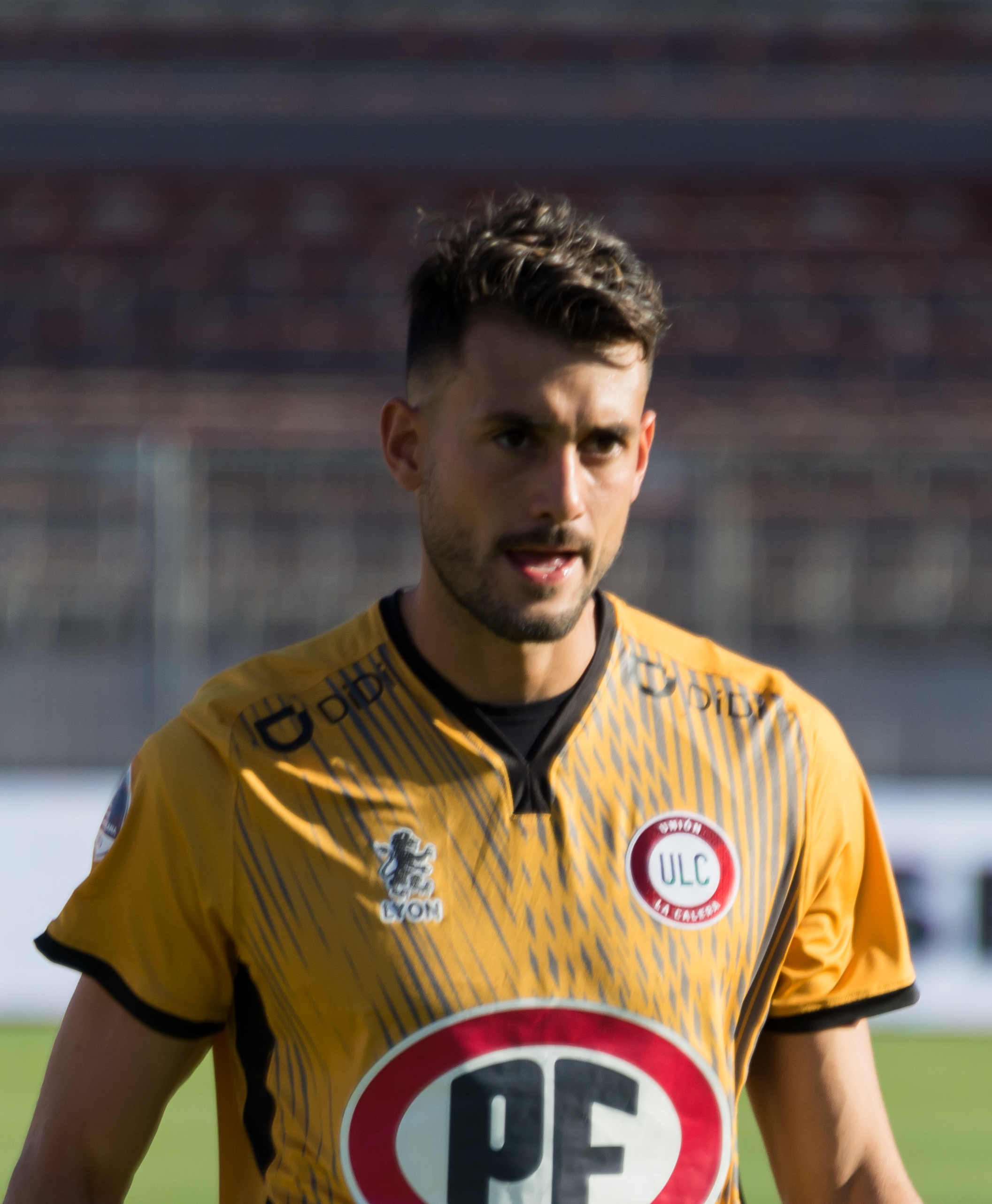

Personal information
- Full name: Alexis Martín Arias
- Date of birth: 4 July 1992 (age 34)
- Place of birth: Pellegrini, Argentina
- Height: 1.85 m (6 ft 1 in)
- Position: Goalkeeper

Youth career
- 2007–2015: Gimnasia y Esgrima

Senior career*
Years	Team	Apps	(Gls)
2015–2019	Gimnasia y Esgrima	94	(0)
2020–2022	Unión La Calera	65	(0)
2022–2023	O'Higgins	28	(0)
2023	Argentinos Juniors	25	(0)
2024–2026	Cerro Porteño	58	(0)
- * Club domestic league appearances and goals as of 11 September 2026

Alexis Martín Arias (born 4 July 1992) is an Argentine professional footballer who plays as a goalkeeper.

== Career ==
Martín Arias began his career with Gimnasia y Esgrima, firstly in the youth system from 2007. He made his professional debut for the club in a Copa Argentina tie against Deportivo Madryn on 18 May 2016, prior to making his league bow in the final match of the 2016 Argentine Primera División season as he played the full ninety minutes in a 3–0 win at home to Colón. In the following campaign, 2016–17, Martín Arias made thirty appearances as Gimnasia y Esgrima finished 13th. In January 2020, Martín Arias moved abroad to Chile with Unión La Calera.

== Career statistics ==
As of 29 November 2024.

Appearances and goals by club, season and competition
Club	Season	League			Cup		League Cup		Continental		Other		Total	
Club	Season	Division	Apps	Goals	Apps	Goals	Apps	Goals	Apps	Goals	Apps	Goals	Apps	Goals
Gimnasia y Esgrima	2015	Argentine Primera División	0	0	0	0	—		—		—		0	0
Gimnasia y Esgrima	2016	Argentine Primera División	1	0	1	0	—		—		—		2	0
Gimnasia y Esgrima	2016–17	Argentine Primera División	30	0	5	0	—		2 (Note: Appearance(s) in the Copa Sudamericana)	0	—		37	0
Gimnasia y Esgrima	2017–18	Argentine Primera División	26	0	0	0	—		—		—		26	0
Gimnasia y Esgrima	2018–19	Argentine Primera División	22	0	7	0	6	0	—		—		35	0
Gimnasia y Esgrima	2019–20	Argentine Primera División	15	0	1	0	0	0	—		—		16	0
Gimnasia y Esgrima	Total		94	0	14	0	6	0	2	0	—		116	0
Unión La Calera	2020	Chilean Primera División	33	0	—		—		6	0	—		39	0
Unión La Calera	2021	Chilean Primera División	32	0	2	0	—		5 (Note: Appearance(s) in the Copa Libertadores)	0	—		39	0
Unión La Calera	Total		65	0	2	0	—		11	0	—		78	0
O'Higgins	2022	Chilean Primera División	28	0	4	0	—		—		—		32	0
Argentinos Juniors	2023	Argentine Primera División	25	0	3	0	—		4	0	—		32	0
Argentinos Juniors	2024	Paraguayan Primera División	6	0	0	0	—		0	0	—		6	0
Career total			218	0	23	0	6	0	17	0	0	0	264	0
