= Club Atlético Chascomús =

Atlético Chascomús
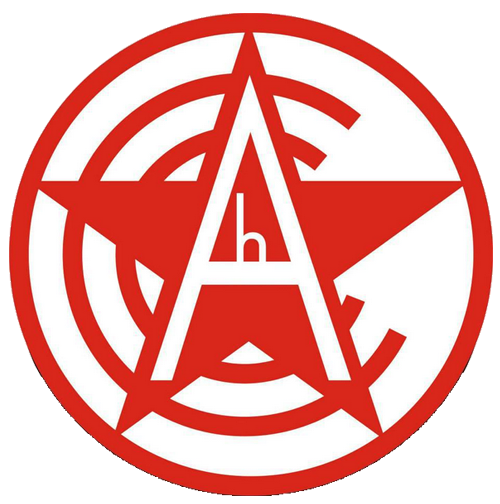
- Full name: Club Atlético Chascomús
- Nicknames: Lagunero, Aguacero, Albirrojo
- Founded: 20 April 1907; 119 years ago
- Ground: Av. Lastra y Obligado, Chascomús, Buenos Aires Province
- Chairman: Javier Saldias
- League: Liga Chascomunense
- 2019: ?
Home colours	Away colours

Club Atlético Chascomús, also known as Atlético Chascomús, is an Argentine sports club from the city of Chascomús in Buenos Aires Province. Although the club is mostly known for its football team, Atlético Chascomús has also competitive teams in other disciplines, such as rugby union (affiliated to the URBA), field hockey (with teams playing in the Cuenca del Salado regional league), and basketball (playing in Asociación Platense de Básquet of La Plata).

Other sports hosted by Atlético are swimming and tennis.

== Football ==
Atlético Chascomús is affiliated to the Liga Chascomunense de Fútbol, having won the most titles with 20 championships. Apart from the local league, Atlético has also taken part in the Torneo Argentino C (also called "Torneo del Interior") 9 times. Its last participation in that tournament was in 2011.

Club's main rival is the other football team of the city, Tiro Federal, also playing in the Chascomús league.

=== Titles ===
- Liga Chascomunense de Fútbol (20): 1937, 1938, 1939, 1940, 1944, 1945, 1969, 1970, 1971, 1972, 1974, 1976, 1980, 1981, 1991, Ap 1999, Cl 2001, Ap 2002, Ap 2003, 2004

== Rugby union ==
Atlético Chascomús rugby union team currently plays in Segunda División, the 5th. division of the URBA league system.

The team finished 6th. in the 2025 season.
