= Horacio Tijanovich =

Argentine footballer

Personal information
- Full name: Horacio Gabriel Tijanovich
- Date of birth: 28 February 1996 (age 30)
- Place of birth: Villa San Justo, Entre Rios Province, Argentina
- Height: 1.73 m (5 ft 8 in)
- Position: Winger

Team information
- Current team: Central Córdoba SdE
- Number: 11

Youth career
- Don Bosco
- Atlético Uruguay

Senior career*
Years	Team	Apps	(Gls)
2012–2014	Defensores de Pronunciamiento	13	(4)
2014–2021	Gimnasia LP	40	(3)
2016–2017	→ Agropecuario (loan)	31	(8)
2017–2018	→ Defensa y Justicia (loan)	15	(0)
2021–2023	Platense	44	(3)
2023–2024	Banfield	6	(0)
2024	Delfín	9	(0)
2024–2025	Cerro	11	(1)
2025–2026	San Martín SJ	21	(2)
2026–	Central Córdoba SdE	24	(0)
- * Club domestic league appearances and goals as of 17:20, 12 November 2026 (UTC)

Horacio Gabriel Tijanovich (born 28 February 1996) is an Argentine professional footballer who plays as a winger for Central Córdoba SdE.

== Career ==
Tijanovich spent time in the youth of Atlético Uruguay and Don Bosco, prior to starting his senior career in 2012 with Torneo Argentino B team Defensores de Pronunciamiento. He featured thirteen times and scored four goals for DEPRO in 2012–13 as they were relegated to Torneo Argentino C. In February 2014, Tijanovich joined Argentine Primera División side Gimnasia y Esgrima. After being an unused substitute in a Copa Argentina match in July 2015, he made his professional debut in the league on 19 September against Tigre. One further appearance followed two months later versus Colón.

In July 2016, Tijanovich was loaned out to Agropecuario of Torneo Federal A. Eight goals in thirty-one appearances followed, including his first two goals against General Belgrano on 25 September in a season which ended with promotion. He returned to Gimnasia y Esgrima in June 2017, before almost immediately departing on loan again to join Primera División team Defensa y Justicia.

== Career statistics ==
As of 10 September 2018.

Club statistics
Club	Season	League			Cup (Note: Includes the Copa Argentina)		League Cup		Continental (Note: Includes the Copa Sudamericana)		Other		Total	
Club	Season	Division	Apps	Goals	Apps	Goals	Apps	Goals	Apps	Goals	Apps	Goals	Apps	Goals
Defensores de Pronunciamiento	2012–13	Torneo Argentino B	13	4	0	0	—		—		0	0	13	4
Defensores de Pronunciamiento	2014	Torneo Argentino C	0	0	0	0	—		—		0	0	0	0
Defensores de Pronunciamiento	Total		13	4	0	0	—		—		0	0	13	4
Gimnasia y Esgrima	2014	Primera División	0	0	0	0	—		0	0	0	0	0	0
Gimnasia y Esgrima	2015	Primera División	2	0	0	0	—		—		0	0	2	0
Gimnasia y Esgrima	2016	Primera División	0	0	0	0	—		—		0	0	0	0
Gimnasia y Esgrima	2016–17	Primera División	0	0	0	0	—		0	0	0	0	0	0
Gimnasia y Esgrima	2017–18	Primera División	0	0	0	0	—		—		0	0	0	0
Gimnasia y Esgrima	2018–19	Primera División	1	0	0	0	—		—		0	0	1	0
Gimnasia y Esgrima	Total		3	0	0	0	—		0	0	0	0	3	0
Agropecuario (loan)	2016–17	Torneo Federal A	31	8	0	0	—		—		0	0	31	8
Defensa y Justicia (loan)	2017–18	Primera División	15	0	0	0	—		1 (Note: One appearance in 2018 Copa Sudamericana)	0	0	0	16	0
Career total			62	12	0	0	—		1	0	0	0	63	12

== Honours ==
Agropecuario

- Torneo Federal A: 2016–17
