= Estadio Juan Carmelo Zerillo =

Football stadium in La Plata, Argentina

Juan Carmelo Zerillo Stadium
- Estadio Juan Carmelo Zerillo
- del Bosque

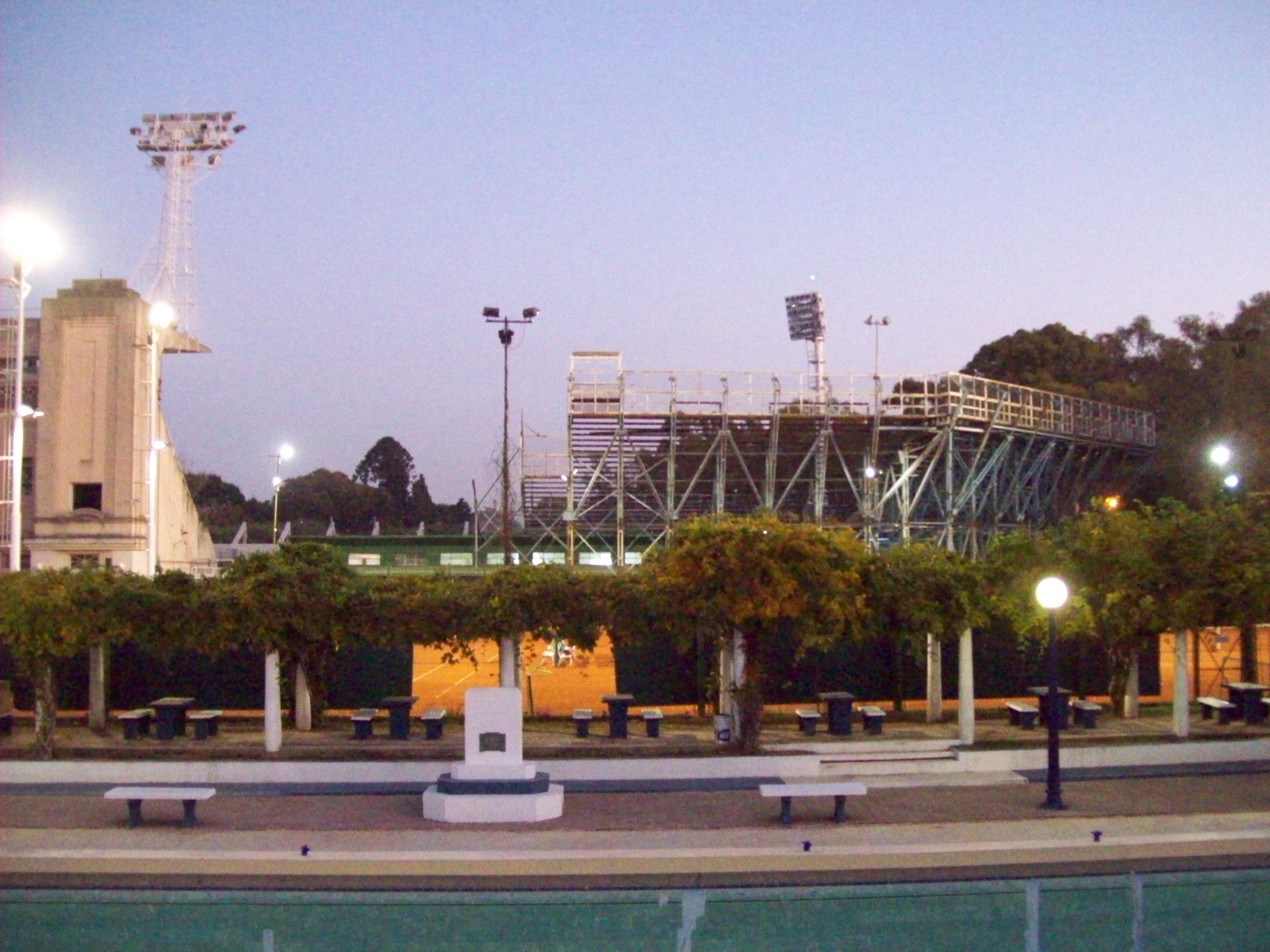
- View of the stadium in 2007
- Interactive map of Juan Carmelo Zerillo Stadium
- Full name: Estadio Juan Carmelo Zerillo
- Address: Calle 118 (between Av. 60 and Av. Iraola); La Plata; Argentina
- Location: Paseo del Bosque, La Plata, Buenos Aires, Argentina
- Coordinates: 34°54′36″S 57°55′56″W
- Owner: Gimnasia y Esgrima La Plata
- Capacity: 30,973
- Surface: Grass
- Field size: 103 x 70 m

Construction
- Opened: 19 November 1924; 101 years ago

Tenant
- Gimnasia y Esgrima La Plata

Website
- Estadio Juan Carmelo Zerillo

The Juan Carmelo Zerillo Stadium, popularly known as del Bosque (Spanish for "of the Forest", due to its location in a big city park called Paseo del Bosque), or simply as El Bosque ("The Forest"), is a football stadium located in the city of La Plata, Argentina. It is located on Calle 118 between Avenida 60 and Avenida Iraola. It is the stadium of the Club de Gimnasia y Esgrima La Plata, and nowadays has the capacity to accommodate approximately 30,973 spectators.

The stadium was named in honor of Juan Carmelo Zerillo, who was president of the club between 1929 and 1931. During his tenure, Gimnasia y Esgrima won its first official title, the 1929 Primera División championship.

== History ==
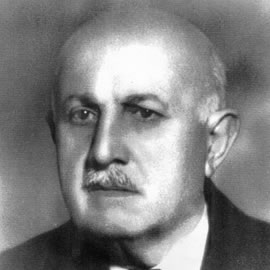
Zerillo in 1929

On 22 March 1923, work began to build the stadium, with a field's dimensions of 118 meters long and 74 meters wide. On April 26, 1924, a ceremony was held, with the presence of then Governor, Dr. Cantilo. The official inauguration, however, was postponed until the anniversary of the city of La Plata, on 19 November, with Gimnasia playing a friendly match against Uruguayan club Peñarol.

The stands were made of wood, as it was traditional at that time. The club added a concrete covered structure to house the club members. This covered structure, situated in the midfield, was finished in 1931; individual seats were added to it in the late 1940s. This structure has been classified as a historical building by the city of La Plata (City order #1579).

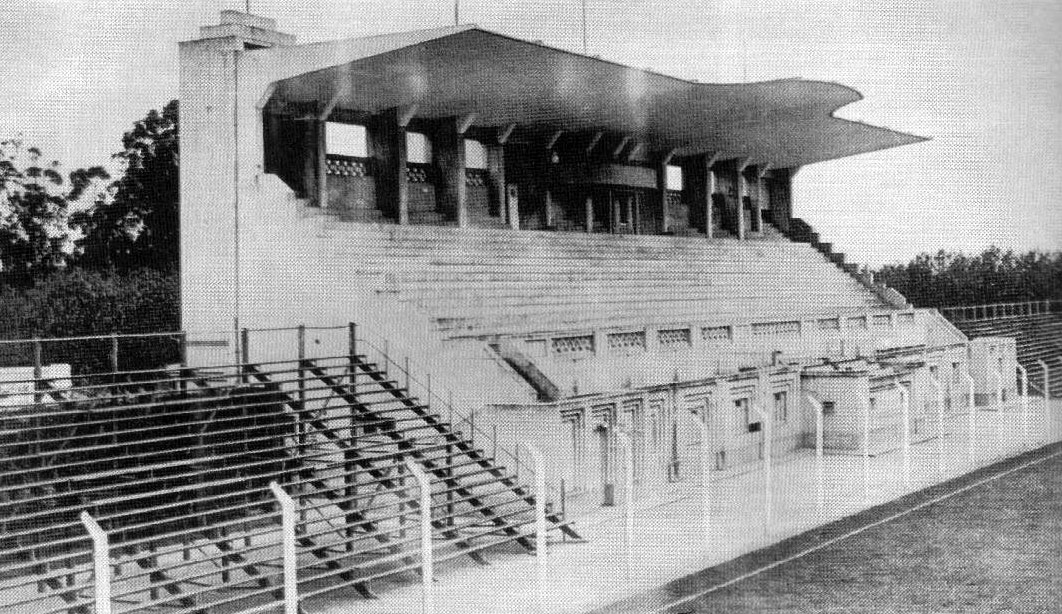
View of the stadium's official stands, c. 1931

During a La Plata derby game in 1959, one of the wooden stands collapsed, causing dozens of injuries and the suspension of the match. Over the years the stadium changed its structure, in order to harbor a greater number of public. After the club's remarkable campaigns in the 90s and the delay of the construction of the Estadio Ciudad de La Plata, Gimnasia's coach Carlos Timoteo Griguol required the then club's president, Héctor Delmar, to expand the capacity of the stadium to meet the standards required by FIFA, which said that from 2001 no first division club could have their stadium built with wood.

Between 2006 and June 2008, the stadium could not be used for official tournaments, due to new safety standards the Co.Pro.Se.De (Coprosede) committee created in 2002 with the aim of reducing incidents of violence at sporting events in the province of Buenos Aires. The president at the time, Juan José Muñoz, decided to use the Estadio Ciudad de La Plata to play the home games. This decision taken by Muñoz was done without calling an assembly. This unilateral decision resulted in several complaints.

The management board that took the reins of the club in 2008 began some repairs and improvements of facilities in early 2008 to get the approval of the Coprosede to play official matches. On 21 June 2008, Gimnasia played again an official game in El Bosque, against Lanús. Since the start of the Apertura 2008 tournament, Gimnasia use their Stadium of the Forest for most home games.

CGE drew an average home attendance of 26,813 in the 2024 Argentine Primera División.
