= 2019–20 Copa Argentina =

Tournament details
- Country: Argentina
- Dates: 15 January 2020 – 8 December 2021
- Teams: 77

Final positions
- Champions: Boca Juniors (4th title)
- Runners-up: Talleres (C)
- 2022 Copa Libertadores: Boca Juniors

Tournament statistics
- Matches played: 89
- Goals scored: 201 (2.26 per match)
- Top goal scorer: Michael Santos (4 goals)

Awards
- Best player: Agustín Rossi

The 2019–20 Copa Argentina (officially the Copa Argentina AXION energy 2019–20 for sponsorship reasons) was the eleventh edition of the Copa Argentina, and the ninth since the relaunch of the tournament in 2011. The competition began on 15 January 2020 and ended on 8 December 2021. On 17 March 2020, the Argentine Football Association (AFA) announced the suspension of the tournament to prevent the spread of the coronavirus COVID-19. After several months the tournament resumed on 23 December 2020.

Originally, the champions would have qualified for the 2021 Copa Libertadores, however on 11 December 2020 the Copa Argentina organizers announced that the 2019–20 edition would not end before the beginning of the 2021 Copa Libertadores. Therefore, AFA decided that the Copa Argentina berth for the 2021 Copa Libertadores would be reallocated to the best team of the 2019–20 Superliga Argentina and 2020 Copa de la Superliga aggregate table not yet qualified and that the champions would qualify for the 2022 Copa Libertadores instead, as proposed to AFA by the Copa Argentina organizers. River Plate, the defending champions, were eliminated in the round of 16.

Boca Juniors defeated Talleres (C) in the final on penalties to win their fourth tournament title. As champions, they qualified for the 2022 Copa Libertadores group stage and the 2021 Supercopa Argentina.

== Teams ==
Seventy-seven teams took part in this competition: All twenty-four teams from the Primera División; fourteen teams of the Primera Nacional; six from the Primera B, four from the Primera C; three from the Primera D and twenty-six teams from Federal A.

=== First Level ===
==== Primera División ====
All twenty-four teams of 2019–20 tournament qualified.

- Aldosivi
- Argentinos Juniors
- Arsenal
- Atlético Tucumán
- Banfield
- Boca Juniors
- Central Córdoba (SdE)
- Colón
- Defensa y Justicia
- Estudiantes (LP)
- Gimnasia y Esgrima (LP)
- Godoy Cruz
- Huracán
- Independiente
- Lanús
- Newell's Old Boys
- Patronato
- Racing Club
- River Plate^{TH}
- Rosario Central
- San Lorenzo
- Talleres (C)
- Unión
- Vélez Sarsfield

=== Second Level ===
==== Primera Nacional ====
The top-seven teams of each zone at the 15th round of 2019–20 tournament qualified.

- Alvarado
- Atlanta
- Atlético de Rafaela
- Defensores de Belgrano
- Deportivo Riestra
- Estudiantes (BA)
- Estudiantes (RC)
- Instituto
- Platense
- San Martín (SJ)
- San Martín (T)
- Sarmiento (J)
- Temperley
- Tigre

=== Third Level ===
==== Primera B Metropolitana ====
The top-six teams at the 17th round of 2019–20 Primera B tournament qualified.

- Almirante Brown
- Comunicaciones
- J. J. Urquiza
- San Telmo
- Talleres (RdE)
- Villa San Carlos

==== Torneo Federal A ====
The top-thirteen teams of each zone at the 15th round of 2019–20 tournament qualified.

- Boca Unidos
- Central Norte
- Chaco For Ever
- Cipolletti
- Círculo Deportivo
- Crucero del Norte
- Defensores (P)
- Defensores de Belgrano (VR)
- Deportivo Camioneros
- Deportivo Madryn
- Deportivo Maipú
- Desamparados
- Douglas Haig
- Estudiantes (SL)
- Ferro Carril Oeste (GP)
- Güemes (SdE)
- Huracán Las Heras
- San Martín (F)
- Sansinena
- Sarmiento (R)
- Sol de Mayo
- Sportivo Belgrano
- Sportivo Las Parejas
- Sportivo Peñarol
- Unión (S)
- Villa Mitre

=== Fourth Level ===
==== Primera C Metropolitana ====
The top-four teams at the 19th round of 2019–20 Primera C tournament qualified.

- Cañuelas
- Dock Sud
- Laferrere
- Real Pilar

=== Fifth Level ===
==== Primera D Metropolitana ====
The top-three teams at the 13th round of 2019–20 Primera D tournament qualified.

- Claypole
- Liniers
- Sportivo Barracas

== Round and draw dates ==
Phase	Round	Draw date	First leg	Second leg
Regional Round	Round I	11 December 2019	15 January–11 February 2020	19 January–19 February 2020
Final Stage	Round of 64	30 January 2020	25 February 2020 – 17 March 2021	
Final Stage	Round of 32	30 January 2020	17 March–4 August 2021	
Final Stage	Round of 16	30 January 2020	13 July–22 September	
Final Stage	Quarterfinals	30 January 2020	22 September–13 October 2021	
Final Stage	Semifinals	30 January 2020	3 November–1 December 2021	
Final Stage	Final	30 January 2020	8 December 2021	

== Regional Round ==
This round was organized by the Consejo Federal.

=== Round I ===
In the Round I, 26 teams from Torneo Federal A participated. The round was played between 15 January and 19 February 2020, on a home-and-away two-legged tie. The 13 winning teams advanced to the Final Round.

Team 1	Agg.	Team 2	1st leg	2nd leg
Sarmiento (R)	1–2	Chaco For Ever	1–1	0–1
Desamparados	1–5	Sportivo Peñarol	0–1	1–4
Huracán Las Heras	4–1	Deportivo Maipú	1–0	3–1
Sansinena	2–3	Villa Mitre	2–2	0–1
Sol de Mayo	1–7	Deportivo Madryn	0–2	1–5
Cipolletti	1–1 (a)	Ferro Carril Oeste (GP)	0–0	1–1
Círculo Deportivo	3–3 (0–3 p)	Deportivo Camioneros	2–1	1–2
Defensores de Belgrano (VR)	0–1	Douglas Haig	0–0	0–1
Central Norte	3–3 (a)	Güemes (SdE)	2–2	1–1
San Martín (F)	1–3	Boca Unidos	1–2	0–1
Crucero del Norte	4–4 (a)	Defensores (P)	2–3	2–1
Sportivo Belgrano	2–0	Unión (S)	1–0	1–0
Estudiantes (SL)	3–2	Sportivo Las Parejas	1–1	2–1

==== First leg ====
January 21, 2020	Sarmiento (R)	1–1	Chaco For Ever	Resistencia, Pcia. de Chaco
21:00	López 12'	Report	Torres 89'	Stadium: Centenario; Referee: Fabricio Llobet

February 12, 2020	Desamparados	0–1	Sportivo Peñarol	San Juan, Pcia. de San Juan
21:45		Report	Fernández 32'	Stadium: El Serpentario; Referee: Carlos Gariano

January 18, 2020	Huracán Las Heras	1–0	Deportivo Maipú	Las Heras, Pcia. de Mendoza
18:00	Barrera 69'	Report		Stadium: General San Martín; Referee: César Ceballo

January 18, 2020	Sansinena	2–2	Villa Mitre	General Daniel Cerri, Pcia. de Buenos Aires
17:30	Guajardo 38'; Mc Coubrey 48'	Report	Torres 2'; H. González 6' (pen.)	Stadium: Luis Molina; Referee: Fernando Omar Marcos

January 15, 2020	Sol de Mayo	0–2	Deportivo Madryn	Viedma, Pcia. de Río Negro
17:30		Report	Zúñiga 22'; Jeldres 53'	Stadium: Sol de Mayo; Referee: Sergio Testa

January 23, 2020	Cipolletti	0–0	Ferro Carril Oeste (GP)	Cipolletti, Pcia. de Río Negro
21:30		Report		Stadium: La Visera de Cemento; Referee: Sergio Testa

January 15, 2020	Círculo Deportivo	2–1	Deportivo Camioneros	Comandante Nicanor Otamendi, Pcia. de Buenos Aires
17:30	Buzzini 35' (pen.); Lazaneo 50'	Report	J. González 24'	Stadium: Guillermo Trama; Referee: Fernando Omar Marcos

January 19, 2020	Defensores de Belgrano (VR)	0–0	Douglas Haig	San Nicolás de los Arroyos, Pcia. de Buenos Aires
20:00		Report		Stadium: Único de San Nicolás; Referee: Maximiliano Macheroni

January 16, 2020	Central Norte	2–2	Güemes (SdE)	Salta, Pcia. de Salta
22:00	Ríos 1'; Rivas 84'	Report	Romero 30'; N. Rodríguez 65'	Stadium: Padre Ernesto Martearena; Referee: Nelson Bejas

January 19, 2020	San Martín (F)	1–2	Boca Unidos	Formosa, Pcia. de Formosa
17:30	Leiva 61'	Report	Núñez 6'; Fabro 57'	Stadium: 17 de Octubre; Referee: Nelson Bejas

January 16, 2020	Crucero del Norte	2–3	Defensores (P)	Garupá, Pcia. de Misiones
21:15	Vera 29' (pen.); Campozano 49'	Report	Robles 22', 24'; Allende 85'	Stadium: Comandante Andrés Guacurarí; Referee: Guillermo González

January 19, 2020	Sportivo Belgrano	1–0	Unión (S)	San Francisco, Pcia. de Córdoba
19:00	Balmaceda 60'	Report		Stadium: Oscar C. Boero; Referee: José Sandoval

January 18, 2020	Estudiantes (SL)	1–1	Sportivo Las Parejas	San Luis, Pcia. de San Luis
20:00	F. Quiroga 57'	Report	Salvatierra 27'	Stadium: Héctor Odicino-Pedro Benoza; Referee: Jonathan Correa

==== Second leg ====
February 4, 2020	Chaco For Ever	1–0 (2–1 agg.)	Sarmiento (R)	Resistencia, Pcia. de Chaco
22:00	Santa Cruz 18'	Report		Stadium: Juan Alberto García; Referee: Carlos Córdoba

February 19, 2020	Sportivo Peñarol	4–1 (5–1 agg.)	Desamparados	Chimbas, Pcia. de San Juan
21:45	Cantero 19', 71'; Fernández 45+2'; Paz 61'	Report	Lastra 45'	Stadium: Ramón Pablo Rojas; Referee: Pablo Núñez

January 22, 2020	Deportivo Maipú	1–3 (1–4 agg.)	Huracán Las Heras	Maipú, Pcia. de Mendoza
21:40	Nasta 26'	Report	Lucero 50', 81'; Herrera 76' (pen.)	Stadium: Omar Higinio Sperdutti; Referee: Mario Ejarque

January 22, 2020	Villa Mitre	1–0 (3–2 agg.)	Sansinena	Bahía Blanca, Pcia. de Buenos Aires
21:00	Escobares 90+5'	Report		Stadium: El Fortín; Referee: Bruno Bocca

January 19, 2020	Deportivo Madryn	5–1 (7–1 agg.)	Sol de Mayo	Puerto Madryn, Pcia. de Chubut
18:00	Maldonado 1'; González 17'; Becerra 20'; Giménez 31', 57' (pen.)	Report	Valdebenito 37' (pen.)	Stadium: Abel Sastre; Referee: Julio Luciano

January 31, 2020	Ferro Carril Oeste (GP)	1–1 (1–1 agg.)	Cipolletti	General Pico, Pcia. de La Pampa
21:30	Canuhé 59'	Report	Trecco 26'	Stadium: El Coloso de Barrio Talleres; Referee: Lucas Novelli

January 19, 2020	Deportivo Camioneros	2–1 (3–3 agg.) (3–0 p)	Círculo Deportivo	Nueve de Abril, Pcia. de Buenos Aires
17:00	Tello 3'; Zaninovic 78'	Report	Vedda 87'	Stadium: Hugo Moyano; Referee: Carlos Gariano
	Penalties
	J. González (penalty scored); Campo (penalty scored); Baglivo (penalty scored)		(penalty missed) Atlante; (penalty missed) Ullúa; (penalty missed) Astiz

February 5, 2020	Douglas Haig	1–0 (1–0 agg.)	Defensores de Belgrano (VR)	Pergamino, Pcia. de Buenos Aires
17:00	Bastianini 87'	Report		Stadium: Miguel Morales; Referee: Fernando Omar Marcos

January 21, 2020	Güemes (SdE)	1–1 (3–3 agg.)	Central Norte	Santiago del Estero, Pcia. de Santiago del Estero
22:00	Montiglio 86'	Report	Arriola 90+2'	Stadium: Arturo Miranda; Referee: Luis Lobo Medina

February 4, 2020	Boca Unidos	1–0 (3–1 agg.)	San Martín (F)	Corrientes, Pcia. de Corrientes
21:00	A. Morales 50'	Report		Stadium: Leoncio Benítez; Referee: César Ceballo

January 21, 2020	Defensores (P)	1–2 (4–4 agg.)	Crucero del Norte	Villa Elisa, Pcia. de Entre Ríos
21:30	Rodríguez 90+2'	Report	Motta 35'; Klusener 65'	Stadium: Atlético Villa Elisa; Referee: Nahuel Viñas

February 5, 2020	Unión (S)	0–1 (0–2 agg.)	Sportivo Belgrano	Sunchales, Pcia. de Santa Fe
20:00		Report	Strada 67'	Stadium: La Fortaleza del Bicho; Referee: Rodrigo Rivero

February 19, 2020	Sportivo Las Parejas	1–2 (2–3 agg.)	Estudiantes (SL)	Las Parejas, Pcia. de Santa Fe
20:00	Ortigoza 69'	Report	Amieva 1'; F. Quiroga 45'	Stadium: 4 de Septiembre; Referee: Nahuel Viñas

== Final Rounds ==
=== Draw ===
The draw for the Final Rounds was held on 30 January 2020, 18:00 at AFA Futsal Stadium in Ezeiza. The 64 qualified teams were divided in four groups. Teams were seeded by their historical performance and Division. Champions of AFA tournaments playing in Argentine Primera División were allocated to Group A. The matches were drawn from the respective confronts: A vs. C; B vs. D. Some combinations were avoided for security reasons.

Group A	Group B	Group C	Group D
Argentinos Juniors; Arsenal; Banfield; Boca Juniors; Estudiantes (LP); Gimnasia y Esgrima (LP); Huracán; Independiente; Lanús; Newell's Old Boys; Racing; River Plate; Rosario Central; San Lorenzo; Vélez Sarsfield	Aldosivi; Atlanta; Atlético Tucumán; Central Córdoba (SdE); Colón; Defensa y Justicia; Defensores de Belgrano; Estudiantes (RC); Godoy Cruz; Patronato; Platense; San Martín (T); Sarmiento (J); Talleres (C); Temperley; Tigre; Unión	Boca Unidos^{[1]}; Cañuelas; Claypole; Defensores (P); Deportivo Camioneros; Estudiantes (SL)^{[1]}; Güemes (SdE); Huracán Las Heras; Laferrere; Liniers; Real Pilar; Sportivo Barracas; Sportivo Belgrano^{[1]}; Sportivo Peñarol^{[1]}; Villa Mitre	Almirante Brown; Alvarado; Atlético de Rafaela; Chaco For Ever^{[1]}; Cipolletti^{[1]}; Comunicaciones; Deportivo Madryn; Deportivo Riestra; Dock Sud; Douglas Haig^{[1]}; Estudiantes (BA); Instituto; J. J. Urquiza; San Martín (SJ); San Telmo; Talleres (RdE); Villa San Carlos

^{1} The identity of seven teams from Torneo Federal A were not known at the time of the draw.

=== Bracket ===
==== Upper bracket ====
Round of 64
Newell's Old Boys	2
Sportivo Peñarol	0
Sarmiento (J)	3
Douglas Haig	0
Aldosivi	1
Talleres (RdE)	3
Temperley (p)	0 (4)
Deportivo Riestra	0 (2)
Arsenal	0
Huracán Las Heras	1
Estudiantes (RC)	1
Chaco For Ever	0
Talleres (C) (p)	0 (6)
Atlético de Rafaela	0 (5)
Vélez Sarsfield	3
Deportivo Camioneros	1
Rosario Central	0
Boca Unidos	3
Godoy Cruz	3
J. J. Urquiza	1
San Martín (T)	0
San Martín (SJ)	1
Racing	3
Sportivo Belgrano	1
San Lorenzo	3
Liniers	0
Defensa y Justicia	1
Estudiantes (BA)	0
Tigre (p)	1 (5)
Alvarado	1 (3)
Independiente	1
Villa Mitre	0

Round of 32
Newell's Old Boys	0
Sarmiento (J)	1
Talleres (RdE)	0
Temperley	4
Huracán Las Heras	1
Estudiantes (RC)	4
Talleres (C) (p)	1 (3)
Vélez Sarsfield	1 (1)
Boca Unidos	0
Godoy Cruz	2
San Martín (SJ)	2 (1)
Racing (p)	2 (4)
San Lorenzo	0
Defensa y Justicia	2
Tigre	2
Independiente	1

Round of 16
Sarmiento (J)	0
Temperley	1
Estudiantes (RC)	1 (5)
Talleres (C) (p)	1 (6)
Godoy Cruz (p)	3 (5)
Racing	3 (4)
Defensa y Justicia	0 (4)
Tigre (p)	0 (5)

Quarterfinals
Temperley	1
Talleres (C)	2
Godoy Cruz	1
Tigre	0

Semifinals
Talleres (C)	1
Godoy Cruz	0

==== Lower bracket ====
Round of 64
Boca Juniors	2
Claypole	1
Defensores de Belgrano	4
Almirante Brown	2
Atlético Tucumán	3
Comunicaciones	0
River Plate	4
Defensores (P)	0
Huracán	1 (4)
Estudiantes (SL) (p)	1 (5)
Atlanta	0 (3)
Villa San Carlos (p)	0 (4)
Patronato (p)	1 (5)
Instituto	1 (3)
Lanús	3
Real Pilar	1
Gimnasia y Esgrima (LP)	2
Sportivo Barracas	0
Unión	1 (5)
Dock Sud (p)	1 (6)
Colón	1
Cipolletti	0
Argentinos Juniors	1
Cañuelas	0
Estudiantes (LP)	1 (4)
Laferrere (p)	1 (5)
Central Córdoba (SdE)	0
San Telmo	1
Platense	0
Deportivo Madryn	1
Banfield	2
Güemes (SdE)	0

Round of 32
Boca Juniors	3
Defensores de Belgrano	0
Atlético Tucumán	1
River Plate	2
Estudiantes (SL)	1
Villa San Carlos	2
Patronato (p)	2 (5)
Lanús	2 (3)
Gimnasia y Esgrima (LP)	5
Dock Sud	0
Colón	0
Argentinos Juniors	1
Laferrere	0
San Telmo	2
Deportivo Madryn	0
Banfield	1

Round of 16
Boca Juniors (p)	0 (4)
River Plate	0 (1)
Villa San Carlos	0
Patronato	1
Gimnasia y Esgrima (LP)	2
Argentinos Juniors	3
San Telmo	1
Banfield	0

Quarterfinals
Boca Juniors (p)	0 (4)
Patronato	0 (2)
Argentinos Juniors	2
San Telmo	1

Semifinals
Boca Juniors	1
Argentinos Juniors	0

=== Round of 64 ===
The Round of 64 had 13 qualified teams from the Regional Round (13 teams from Torneo Federal A), 13 qualified teams from the Metropolitan Zone (6 teams from Primera B Metropolitana; 4 teams from Primera C and 3 teams from Primera D), 14 teams from Primera B Nacional and 24 teams from Primera División. The round was played between 25 February 2020 and 17 March 2021, in a single knock-out match format. The 32 winning teams advanced to the Round of 32.

December 23, 2020	Newell's Old Boys	2–0	Sportivo Peñarol	San Nicolás de los Arroyos, Pcia. de Buenos Aires
18:10	Palacios 39'; Cabrera 90'	Report		Stadium: Único de San Nicolás; Referee: Pablo Dóvalo

March 10, 2021	Banfield	2–0	Güemes (SdE)	Turdera, Pcia. de Buenos Aires
17:10	Pons 40'; Galoppo 54'	Report		Stadium: Alfredo Beranger; Referee: Carlos Córdoba

March 3, 2021	Boca Juniors	2–1	Claypole	Lanús, Pcia. de Buenos Aires
21:30	Villa 35'; Maroni 76'	Report	Landaburu 29'	Stadium: Ciudad de Lanús – Néstor Díaz Pérez; Referee: Leandro Rey Hilfer

March 10, 2021	Independiente	1–0	Villa Mitre	Mar del Plata, Pcia. de Buenos Aires
21:30	S. Romero 45+1' (pen.)	Report		Stadium: José María Minella; Referee: Ariel Penel

January 20, 2021	Rosario Central	0–3	Boca Unidos	San Nicolás de los Arroyos, Pcia. de Buenos Aires
19:20		Report	Medina 1' (pen.); Ríos 25'; Ramírez 83' (pen.)	Stadium: Único de San Nicolás; Referee: Hernán Mastrángelo

February 23, 2021	Lanús	3–1	Real Pilar	Sarandí, Pcia. de Buenos Aires
21:10	Sand 47' (pen.); Orozco 71'; Orsini 90+1'	Report	Crego 43'	Stadium: Julio Humberto Grondona; Referee: Nazareno Arasa

February 25, 2020	Gimnasia y Esgrima (LP)	2–0	Sportivo Barracas	Quilmes, Pcia. de Buenos Aires
21:10	Licht 3'; Cocimano 30'	Report		Stadium: Centenario Ciudad de Quilmes; Attendance: Julio Barraza

February 17, 2021	Vélez Sarsfield	3–1	Deportivo Camioneros	Sarandí, Pcia. de Buenos Aires
21:10	Galdames 6'; De La Fuente 10'; Brizuela 30'	Report	Parisi 24' (pen.)	Stadium: Julio Humberto Grondona; Referee: Julio Barraza

January 28, 2021	Arsenal	0–1	Huracán Las Heras	Caseros, Pcia. de Buenos Aires
21:10		Report	L. Agüero 63'	Stadium: Ciudad de Caseros; Referee: Leandro Rey Hilfer

March 11, 2020	Argentinos Juniors	1–0	Cañuelas	Sarandí, Pcia. de Buenos Aires
22:10	Hauche 5'	Report		Stadium: Julio Humberto Grondona; Referee: Carlos Gariano

February 25, 2021	Huracán	1–1 (4–5 p)	Estudiantes (SL)	Cutral Có, Pcia. de Neuquén
17:10	Mendoza 40'	Report	Cesarini 25'	Stadium: Coloso del Ruca Quimey; Referee: Silvio Trucco
	Penalties
	Chávez (penalty scored); Briasco (penalty scored); Toranzo (penalty scored); Bonifacio (penalty scored); Mendoza (penalty missed); Pérez (penalty missed)		(penalty scored) Gorgerino; (penalty scored) Soloppi; (penalty scored) Belfiore; (penalty missed) Garro; (penalty scored) Cesarini; (penalty scored) Felice

March 17, 2021	Racing	3–1	Sportivo Belgrano	Sarandí, Pcia. de Buenos Aires
19:25	Martínez 84'; Copetti 85'; Fértoli 90+2'	Report	Argüello 55'	Stadium: Julio Humberto Grondona; Referee: Nazareno Arasa

February 18, 2021	San Lorenzo	3–0	Liniers	Mar del Plata, Pcia. de Buenos Aires
21:10	Díaz 7'; Ó. Romero 53', 79'	Report		Stadium: José María Minella; Referee: Lucas Comesaña

February 10, 2021	River Plate	4–0	Defensores (P)	Banfield, Pcia. de Buenos Aires
21:10	Suárez 15'; Álvarez 34'; Angileri 58'; Girotti 77'	Report		Stadium: Florencio Sola; Referee: Germán Delfino

March 4, 2020	Estudiantes (LP)	1–1 (4–5 p)	Laferrere	Lanús, Pcia. de Buenos Aires
19:00	F. González 32'	Report	Faillace 40'	Stadium: Ciudad de Lanús – Néstor Díaz Pérez; Referee: Pablo Echavarría
	Penalties
	Schunke (penalty scored); Estévez (penalty scored); Retegui (penalty missed); Díaz (penalty scored); García (penalty scored); Mascherano (penalty missed)		(penalty scored) Scarnato; (penalty scored) López; (penalty missed) Benítez; (penalty scored) Pintos; (penalty scored) Barreal; (penalty scored) Acuña

January 6, 2021	Temperley	0–0 (4–2 p)	Deportivo Riestra	Caseros, Pcia. de Buenos Aires
19:10		Report		Stadium: Ciudad de Caseros; Referee: Pablo Giménez
	Penalties
	Cólzera (penalty scored); Ellacopulos (penalty scored); Di Lorenzo (penalty missed); Muscio (penalty scored); Alonso (penalty scored)		(penalty scored) Pereira; (penalty scored) Ramírez Agudelo; (penalty missed) Rodríguez; (penalty missed) Goitía

February 26, 2020	Aldosivi	1–3	Talleres (RdE)	Sarandí, Pcia. de Buenos Aires
17:35	Verón 90+4'	Report	Sosa 38'; Aranda 86', 90+5'	Stadium: Julio Humberto Grondona; Referee: Jorge Broggi

March 4, 2020	Central Córdoba (SdE)	0–1	San Telmo	Salta, Pcia. de Salta
21:30		Report	Ramírez Agudelo 90'	Stadium: Padre Ernesto Martearena; Referee: Jorge Baliño

March 10, 2021	Atlético Tucumán	3–0	Comunicaciones	Córdoba, Pcia. de Córdoba
19:20	Carrera 46'; Lotti 61'; J. Toledo 88'	Report		Stadium: Presidente Perón; Referee: Yael Falcón Pérez

March 2, 2021	Defensa y Justicia	1–0	Estudiantes (BA)	Turdera, Pcia. de Buenos Aires
22:15	Bou 40'	Report		Stadium: Alfredo Beranger; Referee: Jorge Broggi

March 1, 2021	San Martín (T)	0–1	San Martín (SJ)	Córdoba, Pcia. de Córdoba
21:30		Report	Diarte 84' (o.g.)	Stadium: Presidente Perón; Referee: Jorge Baliño

February 21, 2021	Atlanta	0–0 (3–4 p)	Villa San Carlos	Caseros, Pcia. de Buenos Aires
17:10		Report		Stadium: Ciudad de Caseros; Referee: Carlos Gariano
	Penalties
	Colombini (penalty scored); Ochoa Giménez (penalty scored); Tecilla (penalty scored); Coronel (penalty missed); Cuenca (penalty missed)		(penalty scored) Fernandes Silva; (penalty scored) Alegre; (penalty scored) Badell; (penalty scored) Iberbia

January 14, 2021	Colón	1–0	Cipolletti	Paraná, Pcia. de Entre Ríos
21:10	Aliendro 82'	Report		Stadium: Presbítero Bartolomé Grella; Referee: Carlos Gariano

January 7, 2021	Estudiantes (RC)	1–0	Chaco For Ever	Rafaela, Pcia. de Santa Fe
18:00	Ortigoza 90+3' (pen.)	Report		Stadium: Nuevo Monumental; Referee: Silvio Trucco

March 2, 2021	Talleres (C)	0–0 (6–5 p)	Atlético de Rafaela	San Nicolás de los Arroyos, Pcia. de Buenos Aires
20:10		Report		Stadium: Único de San Nicolás; Referee: Mariano González
	Penalties
	Retegui (penalty scored); Pérez (penalty scored); Auzqui (penalty scored); Méndez (penalty scored); E. Díaz (penalty missed); Hincapié (penalty missed); M. Díaz (penalty missed); Navarro (penalty scored); Valoyes (penalty scored)		(penalty scored) Bieler; (penalty scored) Chimino; (penalty scored) Giménez; (penalty scored) González; (penalty missed) Romero; (penalty missed) Luna; (penalty missed) Calderara; (penalty scored) Sara; (penalty missed) Albertengo

March 5, 2020	Unión	1–1 (5–6 p)	Dock Sud	Rafaela, Pcia. de Santa Fe
20:05	Calderón 90+2'	Report	Caruso 40'	Stadium: Nuevo Monumental; Referee: Yael Falcón Pérez
	Penalties
	Troyansky (penalty scored); Cabrera (penalty scored); Cañete (penalty scored); Mazzola (penalty missed); Bou (penalty scored); Elías (penalty scored); Milo (penalty missed)		(penalty scored) Kissner; (penalty scored) Villalba; (penalty scored) Tamborelli; (penalty scored) Soria; (penalty missed) Manes; (penalty scored) Armoa; (penalty scored) Adín

February 27, 2020	Patronato	1–1 (5–3 p)	Instituto	Santa Fe, Pcia. de Santa Fe
20:05	Silveira 37'	Report	Arce 60' (pen.)	Stadium: 15 de Abril; Referee: Carlos Córdoba
	Penalties
	Silveira (penalty scored); Díaz (penalty scored); Torres (penalty scored); Barreto (penalty scored); Abero (penalty scored)		(penalty scored) Sills; (penalty scored) Agüero; (penalty scored) Silva; (penalty missed) Erpen

December 30, 2020	Godoy Cruz	3–1	J. J. Urquiza	Sarandí, Pcia. de Buenos Aires
19:10	Ferrari 33'; Pizarro 58'; Tesuri 84'	Report	Bonacci 34'	Stadium: Julio Humberto Grondona; Referee: Diego Abal

February 20, 2021	Tigre	1–1 (5–3 p)	Alvarado	Quilmes, Pcia. de Buenos Aires
17:10	Díaz 65'	Report	Valiente 86'	Stadium: Centenario Ciudad de Quilmes; Referee: César Córdoba
	Penalties
	Magnín (penalty scored); Blondel (penalty scored); Prieto (penalty scored); Cavallaro (penalty scored); Cabrera (penalty scored)		(penalty missed) Navarro; (penalty scored) Ponce; (penalty scored) Giacomini; (penalty scored) Mantia

February 19, 2021	Defensores de Belgrano	4–2	Almirante Brown	Caseros, Pcia. de Buenos Aires
21:30	Lugones 3'; López 53'; Olivares 67'; Aquilino 90+6'	Report	D. García 23' (pen.); Vera 61'	Stadium: Ciudad de Caseros; Referee: Pablo Dóvalo

March 10, 2020	Platense	0–1	Deportivo Madryn	Caseros, Pcia. de Buenos Aires
18:00		Report	Distaulo 43'	Stadium: Ciudad de Caseros; Referee: Sebastián Zunino

March 12, 2020	Sarmiento (J)	3–0	Douglas Haig	Quilmes, Pcia. de Buenos Aires
17:00	Magnín 13'; Pombo 73', 83'	Report		Stadium: Centenario Ciudad de Quilmes; Referee: Diego Ceballos

=== Round of 32 ===
This round had 32 qualified teams from the Round of 64. The round was played between 17 March and 4 August 2021, in a single knock-out match format. The 16 winning teams advanced to the Round of 16.

May 17, 2021	Newell's Old Boys	0–1	Sarmiento (J)	San Nicolás de los Arroyos, Pcia. de Buenos Aires
17:10		Report	Borasi 35'	Stadium: Único de San Nicolás; Referee: Pablo Echavarría

May 19, 2021	Talleres (RdE)	0–4	Temperley	Caseros, Pcia. de Buenos Aires
15:10		Report	Vivanco 4'; Baldunciel 51'; Reinhart 77'; Allione 89'	Stadium: Ciudad de Caseros; Referee: Lucas Novelli Sanz

April 21, 2021	Huracán Las Heras	1–4	Estudiantes (RC)	Junín, Pcia. de Buenos Aires
14:00	L. Agüero 83' (pen.)	Report	Ferreira 12' (pen.), 69'; Hesar 43'; D'Angelo 89'	Stadium: Eva Perón; Referee: Adrián Franklin

April 7, 2021	Talleres (C)	1–1 (3–1 p)	Vélez Sarsfield	Banfield, Pcia. de Buenos Aires
18:00	Santos 13'	Report	Janson 90+3'	Stadium: Florencio Sola; Referee: Yael Falcón Pérez
	Penalties
	Retegui (penalty scored); Lago (penalty missed); Guilherme Parede (penalty scored); Soñora (penalty scored)		(penalty missed) Álvarez; (penalty missed) Janson; (penalty scored) Lucero; (penalty missed) Galdames

May 13, 2021	Boca Unidos	0–2	Godoy Cruz	Córdoba, Pcia. de Córdoba
14:10		Report	Bullaude 14'; Ojeda 45+2'	Stadium: El Gigante de Alberdi; Referee: Jorge Broggi

April 14, 2021	San Martín (SJ)	2–2 (1–4 p)	Racing	Sarandí, Pcia. de Buenos Aires
21:10	Giménez 80'; Rescaldani 82'	Report	Martínez 34'; Copetti 63'	Stadium: Julio Humberto Grondona; Referee: Silvio Trucco
	Penalties
	Denis (penalty missed); Rivero (penalty missed); Prósperi (penalty scored)		(penalty scored) Reniero; (penalty scored) Martínez; (penalty scored) Chancalay; (penalty scored) Gutiérrez

March 25, 2021	San Lorenzo	0–2	Defensa y Justicia	Banfield, Pcia. de Buenos Aires
19:10		Report	Benítez 24'; Merentiel 90+2'	Stadium: Florencio Sola; Referee: Diego Abal

August 4, 2021	Tigre	2–1	Independiente	San Nicolás de los Arroyos, Pcia. de Buenos Aires
16:00	Magnín 32'; Protti 68'	Report	S. Romero 53'	Stadium: Único de San Nicolás; Referee: Fernando Echenique

March 24, 2021	Boca Juniors	3–0	Defensores de Belgrano	La Plata, Pcia. de Buenos Aires
20:10	Zárate 10' (pen.), 76' (pen.); Mas 62'	Report		Stadium: Ciudad de La Plata; Referee: Mauro Vigliano

April 7, 2021	Atlético Tucumán	1–2	River Plate	La Plata, Pcia. de Buenos Aires
20:30	Heredia 64'	Report	Girotti 11', 21'	Stadium: Ciudad de La Plata; Referee: Ariel Penel

May 12, 2021	Estudiantes (SL)	1–2	Villa San Carlos	Cutral Có, Pcia. de Neuquén
14:10	L. Quiroga 69'	Report	Silva 54'; Ruiz Martínez 84'	Stadium: Coloso del Ruca Quimey; Referee: Juan Pafundi

April 6, 2021	Patronato	2–2 (5–3 p)	Lanús	Sarandí, Pcia. de Buenos Aires
21:10	Arias 69' (pen.), 81'	Report	Esquivel 43'; De la Vega 72'	Stadium: Julio Humberto Grondona; Referee: Cristian Cernadas
	Penalties
	Sosa Sánchez (penalty scored); Torres (penalty scored); Franco (penalty scored); Palavecino (penalty scored); Marín (penalty scored)		(penalty missed) De la Vega; (penalty scored) Morales; (penalty scored) A. Pérez; (penalty scored) Orsini

March 23, 2021	Gimnasia y Esgrima (LP)	5–0	Dock Sud	Turdera, Pcia. de Buenos Aires
22:10	Carbonero 1'; Pérez García 29'; Cecchini 42'; Contín 50'; Ramírez 57'	Report		Stadium: Alfredo Beranger; Referee: Ariel Suárez

March 17, 2021	Colón	0–1	Argentinos Juniors	San Nicolás de los Arroyos, Pcia. de Buenos Aires
17:15		Report	Ávalos 16'	Stadium: Único de San Nicolás; Referee: Sebastián Mastrángelo

March 17, 2021	Laferrere	0–2	San Telmo	Turdera, Pcia. de Buenos Aires
15:05		Report	Ramírez 64', 73'	Stadium: Alfredo Beranger; Referee: Héctor Paletta

April 28, 2021	Deportivo Madryn	0–1	Banfield	Turdera, Pcia. de Buenos Aires
15:10		Report	Pons 66'	Stadium: Alfredo Beranger; Referee: Pablo Echavarría

=== Round of 16 ===
This round had the 16 qualified teams from the Round of 32. The round was played between 13 July and 22 September 2021, in a single knock-out match format. The 8 winning teams advanced to the Quarterfinals.

July 20, 2021	Sarmiento (J)	0–1	Temperley	San Nicolás de los Arroyos, Pcia. de Buenos Aires
15:05		Report	Pumpido 67'	Stadium: Único de San Nicolás; Referee: Carlos Gariano

August 11, 2021	Estudiantes (RC)	1–1 (5–6 p)	Talleres (C)	Rosario, Pcia. de Santa Fe
21:30	Talpone 51'	Report	Santos 86'	Stadium: Marcelo Bielsa; Referee: Facundo Tello
	Penalties
	Bottino (penalty scored); Padilla (penalty scored); Formica (penalty scored); Hermann (penalty scored); Pardo (penalty scored); Dutari (penalty missed)		(penalty scored) Retegui; (penalty scored) Fértoli; (penalty scored) Santos; (penalty scored) Auzqui; (penalty scored) E. Díaz; (penalty scored) Valoyes

September 22, 2021	Godoy Cruz	3–3 (5–4 p)	Racing	Córdoba, Pcia. de Córdoba
18:10	Bullaude 12'; Burgoa 15'; M. Ramírez 77'	Report	L. López 43'; Copetti 61'; Correa 89'	Stadium: Mario Alberto Kempes; Referee: Fernando Rapallini
	Penalties
	González (penalty scored); Ojeda (penalty scored); Acevedo (penalty scored); M. Ramírez (penalty scored); Bullaude (penalty scored)		(penalty scored) Lovera; (penalty scored) F. Domínguez; (penalty scored) Chancalay; (penalty scored) Alcaraz; (penalty missed) Copetti

September 8, 2021	Defensa y Justicia	0–0 (4–5 p)	Tigre	La Plata, Pcia. de Buenos Aires
21:10		Report		Stadium: Juan Carmelo Zerillo; Referee: Lucas Comesaña
	Penalties
	Frías (penalty missed); Benítez (penalty scored); Merentiel (penalty scored); Barrios (penalty scored); Bou (penalty scored); Gutiérrez (penalty missed); Pizzini (penalty missed)		(penalty scored) Magnín; (penalty missed) González Metilli; (penalty scored) Marinelli; (penalty scored) Prieto; (penalty scored) Céliz; (penalty missed) Cabrera; (penalty scored) Menossi

August 4, 2021	Boca Juniors	0–0 (4–1 p)	River Plate	La Plata, Pcia. de Buenos Aires
19:00		Report		Stadium: Ciudad de La Plata; Referee: Patricio Loustau
	Penalties
	Rojo (penalty scored); Ramírez (penalty scored); Pavón (penalty scored); Izquierdoz (penalty scored)		(penalty missed) Álvarez; (penalty missed) Romero; (penalty scored) Martínez

July 13, 2021	Villa San Carlos	0–1	Patronato	Junín, Pcia. de Buenos Aires
15:35		Report	Delgadillo 73'	Stadium: Eva Perón; Referee: Adrián Franklin

August 18, 2021	Gimnasia y Esgrima (LP)	2–3	Argentinos Juniors	Banfield, Pcia. de Buenos Aires
18:00	Ramírez 30'; Rodríguez 89' (pen.)	Report	Carabajal 61' (pen.); Reniero 67'; Guiffrey 77' (o.g.)	Stadium: Florencio Sola; Referee: Ariel Penel

July 14, 2021	San Telmo	1–0	Banfield	Turdera, Pcia. de Buenos Aires
15:35	Amilivia 81'	Report		Stadium: Alfredo Beranger; Referee: Pablo Giménez

=== Quarterfinals ===
This round had the 8 qualified teams from the Round of 16. The round was played between 22 September and 13 October 2021, in a single knock-out match format. The 4 winning teams advanced to the Semifinals.

September 29, 2021	Temperley	1–2	Talleres (C)	Lanús, Pcia. de Buenos Aires
21:10	E. Rodríguez 83'	Report	Santos 37', 49'	Stadium: Ciudad de Lanús – Néstor Díaz Pérez; Referee: Hernán Mastrángelo

October 6, 2021	Godoy Cruz	1–0	Tigre	Córdoba, Pcia. de Córdoba
21:10	Ojeda 87'	Report		Stadium: Mario Alberto Kempes; Referee: Andrés Merlos

September 22, 2021	Boca Juniors	0–0 (4–2 p)	Patronato	Santiago del Estero, Pcia. de Santiago del Estero
21:30		Report		Stadium: Único Madre de Ciudades; Referee: Pablo Echavarría
	Penalties
	Rojo (penalty scored); Izquierdoz (penalty scored); Molinas (penalty scored); Pavón (penalty scored)		(penalty missed) Sosa Sánchez; (penalty missed) Marín; (penalty scored) Palavecino; (penalty scored) Ibáñez

October 13, 2021	Argentinos Juniors	2–1	San Telmo	San Nicolás de los Arroyos, Pcia. de Buenos Aires
21:10	Mac Allister 63'; Romero 90+3'	Report	Amilivia 38'	Stadium: Único de San Nicolás; Referee: Hernán Mastrángelo

=== Semifinals ===
This round had the 4 qualified teams from the Quarterfinals. The round was played between 3 November and 1 December 2021, in a single knock-out match format. The 2 winning teams advanced to the Final.

December 1, 2021	Talleres (C)	1–0	Godoy Cruz	La Punta, Pcia. de San Luis
21:10	Valoyes 57' (pen.)	Report		Stadium: Provincial Juan Gilberto Funes; Referee: Ariel Penel

November 3, 2021	Boca Juniors	1–0	Argentinos Juniors	Mendoza, Pcia. de Mendoza
21:10	Vázquez 56'	Report		Stadium: Malvinas Argentinas; Referee: Fernando Echenique

=== Final ===
December 8, 2021
21:10

Talleres (C)	0–0	Boca Juniors
	Report
Penalties
Retegui (penalty scored); Fértoli (penalty missed); Méndez (penalty scored); E. Díaz (penalty scored); Santos (penalty scored)	4–5	(penalty scored) Rojo; (penalty scored) Izquierdoz; (penalty scored) Pavón; (penalty scored) Sández; (penalty scored) Salvio

Único Madre de Ciudades, Santiago del Estero
Referee: Darío Herrera

== Top goalscorers ==
Rank	Player	Club	Goals
1	(Uruguay) Michael Santos	Talleres (C)	4
2	(Argentina) Enzo Copetti	Racing	3
2	(Argentina) Federico Girotti	River Plate	3
4	(Argentina) Lucas Agüero	Huracán Las Heras	2
4	(Argentina) Thomas Amilivia	San Telmo	2
4	(Argentina) Alejandro Aranda	Talleres (RdE)	2
4	(Uruguay) Junior Arias	Patronato	2
4	(Argentina) Ezequiel Bullaude	Godoy Cruz	2
4	(Argentina) Alan Cantero	Sportivo Peñarol	2
4	(Argentina) Carlos Alfredo Fernández	Sportivo Peñarol	2
4	(Paraguay) Javier Ferreira	Estudiantes (RC)	2
4	(Argentina) Fabio Giménez	Deportivo Madryn	2
4	(Argentina) Cristian Lucero	Huracán Las Heras	2
4	(Argentina) Pablo Magnín	Sarmiento (J)/Tigre	2
4	(Argentina) Mauricio Martínez	Racing	2
4	(Argentina) Martín Ojeda	Godoy Cruz	2
4	(Argentina) Claudio Pombo	Sarmiento (J)	2
4	(Argentina) Luciano Pons	Banfield	2
4	(Argentina) Facundo Quiroga	Estudiantes (SL)	2
4	(Argentina) Eric Ramírez	Gimnasia y Esgrima (LP)	2
4	(Argentina) Ricardo Ezequiel Ramírez	San Telmo	2
4	(Argentina) Gonzalo Ríos	Central Norte/Boca Unidos	2
4	(Argentina) Lautaro Robles	Defensores (P)	2
4	(Paraguay) Óscar Romero	San Lorenzo	2
4	(Argentina) Silvio Romero	Independiente	2
4	(Argentina) Mauro Zárate	Boca Juniors	2

Source: Copa Argentina

== Team of the tournament ==
Team
Goalkeeper	Defenders	Midfielders	Forwards
Agustín Rossi (Boca Juniors)	Kevin Mac Allister (Argentinos Juniors); Carlos Izquierdoz (Boca Juniors); Marcos Rojo (Boca Juniors); Enzo Díaz (Talleres (C))	Agustín Allione (Temperley); Gabriel Carabajal (Argentinos Juniors); Martín Ojeda (Godoy Cruz)	Enzo Copetti (Racing); Thomas Amilivia (San Telmo); Michael Santos (Talleres (C))
Substitutes
Alan González (San Telmo)	Nahuel Tenaglia (Talleres (C))	Mauricio Martínez (Racing); Jorman Campuzano (Boca Juniors); Juan Ignacio Silva (Villa San Carlos); Gabriel Florentín (Argentinos Juniors)	Alan Cantero (Sportivo Peñarol/Godoy Cruz); Eric Ramírez (Gimnasia y Esgrima (LP)); Federico Girotti (River Plate); Junior Arias (Patronato); Luciano Pons (Banfield); Pablo Magnín (Sarmiento (J)/Tigre)
Coach
Alexander Medina (Talleres (C))

Source: Copa Argentina

== See also ==
- 2019–20 Argentine Primera División
- 2019–20 Primera B Nacional
- 2019–20 Torneo Federal A
