= Santiago López =

Santiago López may refer to:

== Footballers ==
- Santiago López (footballer, born 1982), Uruguayan forward for Villa Española
- Santiago López (footballer, born 1989), Argentine left-back for Berazategui
- Santiago López (footballer, born 1991), Uruguayan former midfielder
- Santiago López (footballer, born 1992), Mexican former midfielder
- Santiago López (footballer, born August 1997), Argentine centre-back
- Santiago López (footballer, born December 1997), Argentine midfielder for Gimnasia Mendoza
- Santiago López (soccer, born 2005), Canadian forward for UNAM
- Santiago López (footballer, born 2006), Argentine winger for Independiente

== Other people ==
- Santiago López Becerra (born 1949), Mexican politician
- Santiago López de Medrano (born 1942), Mexican mathematician
- Santiago López de Rego y Labarta (1869–1941), Spanish clergyman
- Santiago López Hernández (born 1957), Mexican politician
- Santiago López Valdivielso (1950–2024), Spanish politician and businessman
- Santiago López-Vázquez (born 1971), Spanish competitive sailor
