= Nahuel Rodríguez =

Nahuel Rodríguez may refer to:

- Nahuel Rodríguez (footballer, born 1987), Argentine defender for Sportivo Belgrano
- Nahuel Rodríguez (footballer, born 1992), Argentine midfielder for Deportivo Achirense
- Nahuel Rodríguez (footballer, born 1996), Argentine midfielder for Deportivo Capiatá
