= Maximiliano Rodríguez =

Maximiliano Rodríguez or Maxi Rodríguez may refer to:

- Maximiliano Rodríguez (Chilean footballer) (born 2000), Chilean football forward
- Maximiliano Rodríguez (footballer, born 1988), Argentine football midfielder
- Maximiliano Rodríguez (footballer, born 1994), Argentine football midfielder
- Maximiliano Rodríguez (footballer, born 1999), Uruguayan football midfielder
- Maximiliano Óscar Rodríguez (born 1988), Spanish sprinter
- Maxi Rodríguez (Maximiliano Rubén Rodríguez, born 1981), Argentine football midfielder
- Maxi Rodriguez (American soccer) (born 1995), American football midfielder
- Maxi Rodríguez (Uruguayan footballer) (Maximiliano Rodríguez Maeso, born 1990), Uruguayan football midfielder
