= Facundo Melivilo =

Argentine footballer (born 1992)

Personal information
- Full name: Facundo Emmanuel Melivilo
- Date of birth: 20 January 1992 (age 34)
- Place of birth: General Pacheco, Argentina
- Height: 1.88 m (6 ft 2 in)
- Position: Left winger

Team information
- Current team: Güemes

Youth career
- Platense

Senior career*
Years	Team	Apps	(Gls)
2009–2014	Platense	79	(7)
2011–2012	→ Almirante Brown (loan)	35	(3)
2014–2019	Chacarita Juniors	40	(10)
2015	→ Lanús (loan)	1	(92)
2016–2017	→ Flandria (loan)	42	(5)
2017	→ Defensa y Justicia (loan)	3	(0)
2018	→ Deportivo Cuenca (loan)	14	(1)
2018–2019	→ Central Córdoba SdE (loan)	21	(2)
2019–2020	Central Córdoba SdE	16	(0)
2020	Tigre	0	(60)
2020	San Martín T.	4	(0)
2021	Zira	4	(2)
2022–	Güemes Club Social y Deportivo Flandria Club Atlético San Miguel Club Atlético Fénix	18	(2)
- * Club domestic league appearances and goals as of 14:33, 11 July 2022 (UTC)

Facundo Emmanuel Melivilo (born 12 August 1992) is an Argentine professional footballer who plays as a left winger for Güemes.

== Career ==
Melivillo's senior career started in 2009 with Platense in Primera B Nacional, with his debut coming on 28 November in a goalless draw at home to Aldosivi. After seventeen more appearances during 2009–10, which included his first goal in March 2010 vs. Unión Santa Fe, Melivillo was loaned out to Almirante Brown following Platense's relegation to Primera B Metropolitana. He remained with the club for two seasons, 2010–11 and 2011–12, and in total made thirty-five appearances whilst scoring three goals. He returned to Platense in July 2012 and went onto make sixty-seven more appearances and scored six more.

On 14 July 2014, Melivillo completed a move to fellow third tier team Chacarita Juniors. He would score eight goals in twenty games in his first season which ended with promotion to Primera B Nacional. In January 2015, Lanús signed Melivillo on loan. He departed months later after just one appearance; vs. San Lorenzo in the Argentine Primera División on 28 March. Chacarita won promotion from Primera B Nacional to the Primera División during 2016–17, a season that Melivillo spent out on loan with Flandria. For Flandria, he scored five in forty-two matches with his first goal coming vs. Chacarita in 2016.

Defensa y Justicia of the Primera División became Melivillo's sixth professional club in August 2017, he joined on loan until the end of the 2017–18 season. After only three matches for Defensa y Justicia, he returned to Chacarita in December 2017 and was subsequently loaned out to Ecuadorian Serie A side Deportivo Cuenca. He made his debut on 13 February in a Copa Sudamericana defeat to Sportivo Luqueño. He scored his first goal for Deportivo Cuenca on 10 March, during a 4–1 loss away to Emelec. Melivillo departed Chacarita Juniors in June 2018 to Central Córdoba.

He scored two goals in twenty-one games for Central Córdoba, as well as one in three in the play-offs as they won promotion to the Primera División. On 3 July, the left winger renewed his contract with the club. In January 2020, Melivillo agreed a move to second tier Tigre. After, he signed for San Martín de Tucumán and played only four matches on second half 2020. Later, he joined Azerbaijani club Zira FK for the second half of the 2020–21 season. On 22 June 2021, Zira confirmed that Melivilo had left the club.

== Career statistics ==
As of match plated 9 May 2021.

Club statistics
Club	Season	League			Cup		League Cup		Continental		Other		Total	
Club	Season	Division	Apps	Goals	Apps	Goals	Apps	Goals	Apps	Goals	Apps	Goals	Apps	Goals
Platense	2009–10	Primera B Nacional	18	1	0	0	—		—		0	0	18	1
Platense	2010–11	Primera B Metropolitana	0	0	0	0	—		—		0	0	0	0
Platense	2011–12	Primera B Metropolitana	0	0	0	0	—		—		0	0	0	0
Platense	2012–13	Primera B Metropolitana	27	0	3	1	—		—		2 (Note: Appearance(s) in the Primera B Metropolitana play-offs)	0	32	1
Platense	2013–14	Primera B Metropolitana	34	6	1	0	—		—		4	0	39	6
Platense	Total		79	7	4	1	—		—		6	0	89	8
Almirante Brown (loan)	2010–11	Primera B Nacional	14	1	0	0	—		—		0	0	14	1
Almirante Brown (loan)	2011–12	Primera B Nacional	21	2	0	0	—		—		0	0	21	2
Almirante Brown (loan)	Total		35	3	0	0	—		—		0	0	35	3
Chacarita Juniors	2014	Primera B Metropolitana	20	8	0	0	—		—		0	0	20	8
Chacarita Juniors	2015	Primera B Nacional	20	2	3	0	—		—		0	0	23	2
Chacarita Juniors	2016	Primera B Nacional	0	0	0	0	—		—		0	0	0	0
Chacarita Juniors	2016–17	Primera B Nacional	0	0	0	0	—		—		0	0	0	0
Chacarita Juniors	2017–18	Primera División	0	0	0	0	—		—		0	0	0	0
Chacarita Juniors	Total		40	10	3	0	—		—		0	0	43	10
Lanús (loan)	2015	Primera División	1	0	0	0	—		0	0	0	0	1	0
Flandria (loan)	2016–17	Primera B Nacional	42	5	0	0	—		—		0	0	42	5
Defensa y Justicia (loan)	2017–18	Primera División	3	0	0	0	—		0	0	0	0	3	0
Deportivo Cuenca (loan)	2018	Serie A	14	1	—		—		2 (Note: Appearance(s) in the Copa Sudamericana)	0	0	0	16	1
Central Córdoba	2018–19	Primera B Nacional	21	2	5	1	—		—		3 (Note: Appearance(s) in the Primera B Nacional play-offs)	1	29	4
Central Córdoba	2019–20	Primera División	16	0	0	0	0	0	—		0	0	16	0
Central Córdoba	Total		37	2	5	1	0	0	—		3	1	45	4
Tigre	2019–20	Primera B Nacional	0	0	0	0	—		6 (Note: Appearance(s) in the Copa Libertadores)	0	0	0	6	0
San Martín (T)	2020	Primera B Nacional	4	0	0	0	—		—		0	0	4	0
Zira	2020–21	Azerbaijan Premier League	4	2	0	0	—		—		—		4	2
Career total			259	30	12	2	0	0	8	0	9	1	288	33
