= Facundo Quiroga (disambiguation) =

Facundo Quiroga (1788-1835) was an Argentine caudillo.

Facundo Quiroga may also refer to:

- General Juan Facundo Quiroga Department, department of La Rioja Province in Argentina
- Facundo Quiroga (footballer, born 1978), Argentina international football centre-back and right-back
- Facundo Quiroga (footballer, born 1985), Argentine football defender
