= Luis Jerez Silva =

Argentine footballer

Personal information
- Full name: Luis Vicente Jerez Silva
- Date of birth: 20 February 1989 (age 37)
- Place of birth: La Plata, Argentina
- Height: 1.77 m (5 ft 9 1/2 in)
- Position: Central midfielder

Team information
- Current team: Defensores de Belgrano

Senior career*
Years	Team	Apps	(Gls)
2010–2012	Defensa y Justicia	73	(3)
2012–2018	Godoy Cruz	38	(1)
2016	→ Talleres (loan)	20	(1)
2016–2018	→ Defensa y Justicia (loan)	18	(0)
2018–2019	Dorados de Sinaloa	14	(0)
2019–2020	San Martín	18	(1)
2020–2022	Almagro	39	(3)
2022–2023	Güemes	25	(0)
2023–2024	Brown Adrogué	30	(1)
2024–2026	Almagro	55	(0)
2026–	Defensores de Belgrano	6	(0)
- * Club domestic league appearances and goals as of 17:58, 25 April 2026 (UTC)

Luis Vicente Jerez Silva (born 20 February 1989) is an Argentine professional footballer who plays as a central midfielder for Defensores de Belgrano.

== Career ==
Jerez Silva's footballing career began with Primera B Nacional's Defensa y Justicia. He played seventy-three times and scored three goals between January 2010 and May 2012, with his debut coming on 30 January in a defeat to Tiro Federal. Four games after his debut, on 27 February 2010, he scored his first career goal against Ferro Carril Oeste. In July 2012, Jerez Silva joined Argentine Primera División side Godoy Cruz. His first appearance for the club came in a 2–1 loss away to Vélez Sarsfield on 9 November. In all competitions, he scored one goal in thirty-eight matches before leaving on loan in 2016.

He joined Talleres on loan in January 2016. Twenty appearances and one goal followed for Jerez Silva with Talleres as they won the 2016 Primera B Nacional title. On 30 June 2016, Jerez Silva rejoined former club Defensa y Justicia on a temporary basis. His second debut for the club arrived on 27 August in a goalless tie with Rosario Central. Jerez Silva made a move to Mexican football in July 2018 by signing for Dorados de Sinaloa of Ascenso MX. Having spent a season in Mexico, Jerez Silva agreed a return to his homeland on 20 June 2019 after penning terms with San Martín.

After one goal in nineteen total matches for El Verdinegro, Jerez Silva joined fellow Primera B Nacional team Almagro in August 2020.

== Career statistics ==
As of 5 October 2020.

Club statistics
Club	Season	League			Cup		League Cup		Continental		Other		Total	
Club	Season	Division	Apps	Goals	Apps	Goals	Apps	Goals	Apps	Goals	Apps	Goals	Apps	Goals
Defensa y Justicia	2009–10	Primera B Nacional	19	2	0	0	—		—		0	0	19	2
Defensa y Justicia	2010–11	Primera B Nacional	21	1	0	0	—		—		0	0	21	1
Defensa y Justicia	2011–12	Primera B Nacional	33	0	0	0	—		—		0	0	33	0
Defensa y Justicia	Total		73	3	0	0	—		—		0	0	73	3
Godoy Cruz	2012–13	Primera División	2	0	2	0	—		—		0	0	4	0
Godoy Cruz	2013–14	Primera División	12	0	1	0	—		—		0	0	13	0
Godoy Cruz	2014	Primera División	9	1	1	0	—		2 (Note: Appearance(s) in the Copa Sudamericana)	0	0	0	12	1
Godoy Cruz	2015	Primera División	15	0	0	0	—		—		0	0	15	0
Godoy Cruz	2016	Primera División	0	0	0	0	—		—		0	0	0	0
Godoy Cruz	2016–17	Primera División	0	0	0	0	—		0	0	0	0	0	0
Godoy Cruz	2017–18	Primera División	0	0	0	0	—		—		0	0	0	0
Godoy Cruz	Total		38	1	4	0	—		2	0	0	0	44	1
Talleres (loan)	2016	Primera B Nacional	20	1	3	0	—		—		0	0	23	1
Defensa y Justicia (loan)	2016–17	Primera División	6	0	2	0	—		0	0	0	0	8	0
Defensa y Justicia (loan)	2017–18	Primera División	12	0	2	0	—		1	0	0	0	15	0
Defensa y Justicia (loan)	Total		18	0	4	0	—		1	0	0	0	23	0
Dorados de Sinaloa	2018–19	Ascenso MX	14	0	11	0	—		—		6 (Note: Appearance(s) in the Ascenso MX play-offs)	0	31	0
San Martín	2019–20	Primera B Nacional	18	1	1	0	—		—		0	0	19	1
Almagro	2020–21	Primera B Nacional	0	0	0	0	—		—		0	0	0	0
Career total			171	6	23	0	—		3	0	6	0	203	6

== Honours ==
Talleres

- Primera B Nacional: 2016
