= Marcelo Benítez (footballer, born 1991) =

Argentine footballer

Personal information
- Full name: Marcelo Nicolás Benítez
- Date of birth: 13 January 1991 (age 35)
- Place of birth: San Francisco Solano, Argentina
- Height: 1.78 m (5 ft 10 in)
- Positions: Left-back; left midfielder

Team information
- Current team: Güemes

Youth career
- 2004–2011: Defensa y Justicia

Senior career*
Years	Team	Apps	(Gls)
2011–2023	Defensa y Justicia	168	(10)
2016–2017	→ Godoy Cruz (loan)	23	(1)
2017–2018	→ Belgrano (loan)	21	(1)
2018–2019	→ Vitória (loan)	10	(0)
2022	→ Rosario Central (loan)	19	(1)
2023–2024	Central Córdoba (SdE)	21	(1)
2024–2025	Cienciano	30	(0)
2025	Biblioteca Atenas	8	(3)
2025–2026	Tembetary	2	(0)
2026–	Güemes	10	(1)
- * Club domestic league appearances and goals as of 16:51, 29 April 2026 (UTC)

Marcelo Nicolás Benítez (born 13 January 1991) is an Argentine professional footballer who plays as a left-back or left midfielder for Güemes. (Note: Marcelo Benítez at Soccerway)

== Career ==
Benítez's professional career began in 2011 with Defensa y Justicia, with whom he made his debut with in March 2011 against Independiente Rivadavia in Primera B Nacional. Almost a year later, Benítez scored the first goal of his career in a 3–2 defeat at the Estadio Gigante de Arroyito against Rosario Central. Between 2010–11 and 2013–14, Benítez made eighty-eight appearances and scored four goals for Defensa, almost half of those matches came during the club's promotion-winning campaign of 2013–14. His first top-flight appearance came on 9 August 2014 versus Racing Club.

In July 2016, Benítez joined Godoy Cruz on loan. One goal in twenty-three league matches followed in Mendoza. On 7 July 2017, Benítez completed a loan move to Belgrano. A year after, he joined Vitória of Brazil's Série A on a temporary basis.

On 9 February 2022, Benítez joined Rosario Central on a one-year loan deal with a purchase option.

== Career statistics ==
As of 23 August 2018.

Club statistics
Club	Season	League			Cup (Note: Includes the Copa Argentina)		League Cup		Continental (Note: Includes the Copa Libertadores and Copa Sudamericana)		Other		Total	
Club	Season	Division	Apps	Goals	Apps	Goals	Apps	Goals	Apps	Goals	Apps	Goals	Apps	Goals
Defensa y Justicia	2010–11	Primera B Nacional	7	0	0	0	—		—		0	0	7	0
Defensa y Justicia	2011–12	Primera B Nacional	30	2	1	0	—		—		0	0	31	2
Defensa y Justicia	2012–13	Primera B Nacional	10	0	1	0	—		—		0	0	11	0
Defensa y Justicia	2013–14	Primera B Nacional	41	2	0	0	—		—		0	0	41	2
Defensa y Justicia	2014	Primera División	13	0	1	0	—		—		0	0	14	0
Defensa y Justicia	2015	Primera División	26	1	3	0	—		—		0	0	29	1
Defensa y Justicia	2016	Primera División	5	0	0	0	—		—		0	0	5	0
Defensa y Justicia	2016–17	Primera División	0	0	0	0	—		0	0	0	0	0	0
Defensa y Justicia	2017–18	Primera División	0	0	0	0	—		0	0	0	0	0	0
Defensa y Justicia	2018–19	Primera División	0	0	0	0	—		0	0	0	0	0	0
Defensa y Justicia	Total		132	5	6	0	—		0	0	0	0	138	5
Godoy Cruz (loan)	2016–17	Primera División	23	1	3	0	—		4 (Note: Four appearances in the 2017 Copa Libertadores)	0	0	0	30	1
Belgrano (loan)	2017–18	Primera División	21	1	1	0	—		—		0	0	22	1
Vitória (loan)	2018	Série A	3	0	0	0	—		—		0	0	3	0
Career total			179	7	10	0	—		4	0	0	0	193	7
