= Leandro Zazpe =

Uruguayan footballer (born 1994)

Personal information
- Full name: Leandro Agustín Zazpe Rodríguez
- Date of birth: 29 April 1994 (age 32)
- Place of birth: Salinas, Uruguay
- Height: 1.84 m (6 ft 1/2 in)
- Position: Left back

Team information
- Current team: Montevideo Wanderers
- Number: 6

Senior career*
Years	Team	Apps	(Gls)
2013–2016	Fénix	34	(1)
2016–2019	Juventud	32	(4)
2017	→ Defensa y Justicia (loan)	0	(0)
2018	→ Cerro (loan)	30	(2)
2019	Racing Club	20	(1)
2020–2021	Deportes Valdivia	19	(1)
2022	Oriente Petrolero	19	(0)
2023	Libertad	27	(6)
2024	Guabirá	29	(1)
2025–	Montevideo Wanderers	12	(0)
- * Club domestic league appearances and goals as of 3 May 2025

Leandro Agustín Zazpe Rodríguez (born 29 April 1994) is a Uruguayan professional footballer who plays as a left back for Montevideo Wanderers.

== Career ==
Zazpe's first club were Fénix. He made his professional debut in November 2013 during a 2–1 loss to Peñarol. Fourteen appearances later, Zazpe scored his first senior goal in a win vs. Racing Club on 29 August 2015. In July 2016, Zazpe joined Juventud. During 2016 and 2017, he made thirty-two appearances and scored four goals before being loaned to Argentine Primera División side Defensa y Justicia. He returned at the end of 2017 after no appearances for Defensa, appearing on the bench just once in September against Estudiantes. Whilst in Argentina, Juventud were relegated to tier two.

In January 2018, Zazpe signed for Uruguayan Primera División team Cerro on loan. He scored on his debut for Cerro, in a draw with Liverpool on February 4, 2018. A move to Racing Club was completed on 8 January 2019.

== Career statistics ==
As of 31 March 2019.

Club statistics
Club	Season	League			Cup		Continental		Other		Total	
Club	Season	Division	Apps	Goals	Apps	Goals	Apps	Goals	Apps	Goals	Apps	Goals
Fénix	2013–14	Uruguayan Primera División	8	0	—		—		0	0	8	0
Fénix	2014–15	Uruguayan Primera División	4	0	—		—		0	0	4	0
Fénix	2015–16	Uruguayan Primera División	22	1	—		—		0	0	22	1
Fénix	Total		34	1	—		—		0	0	34	1
Juventud	2016	Uruguayan Primera División	11	1	—		—		0	0	11	1
Juventud	2017	Uruguayan Primera División	21	3	—		—		0	0	21	3
Juventud	2018	Uruguayan Segunda División	0	0	—		—		0	0	0	0
Juventud	Total		32	4	—		—		0	0	32	4
Defensa y Justicia (loan)	2017–18	Argentine Primera División	0	0	0	0	0	0	0	0	0	0
Cerro (loan)	2018	Uruguayan Primera División	30	2	—		4 (Note: Appearance(s) in the Copa Sudamericana)	1	0	0	34	3
Racing Club	2019	Uruguayan Primera División	4	0	—		—		0	0	4	0
Career total			100	7	0	0	4	1	0	0	104	8
