= Lucas Suárez (footballer, born 1995) =

Argentine footballer

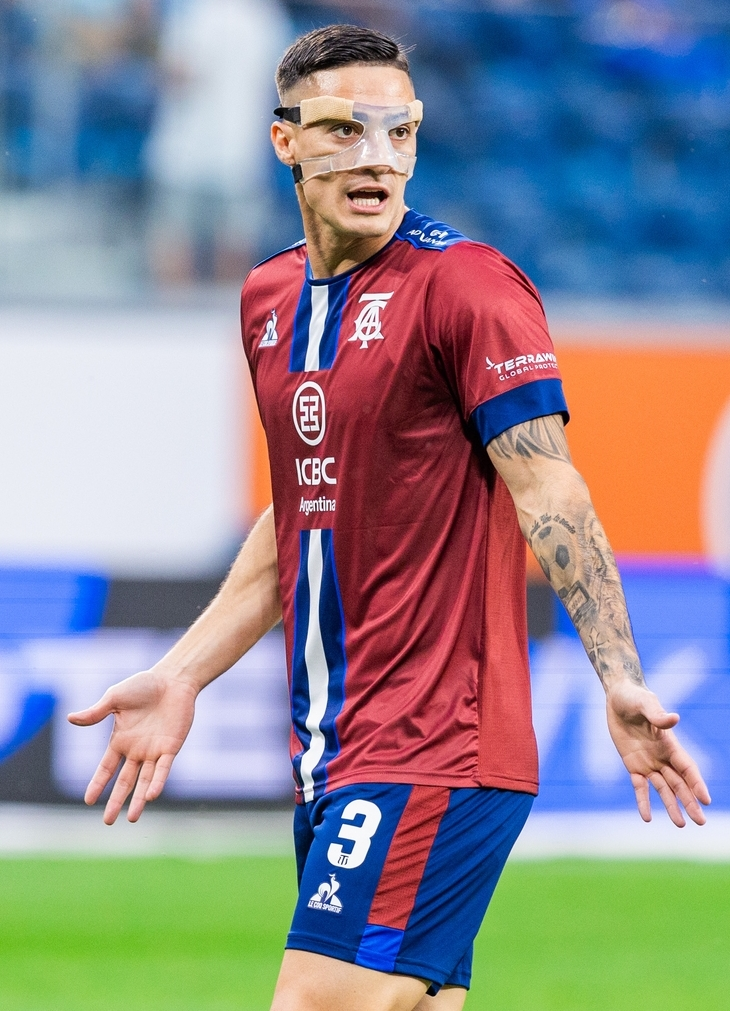

Personal information
- Full name: Lucas Matías Suárez Scalarea
- Date of birth: 17 March 1995 (age 31)
- Place of birth: Río Cuarto, Argentina
- Height: 1.76 m (5 ft 9 in)
- Position: Left-back

Team information
- Current team: Sarmiento (on loan from Talleres)
- Number: 3

Youth career
- Rosario Central
- Quilmes

Senior career*
Years	Team	Apps	(Gls)
2014–2016	Quilmes	26	(1)
2016–2017	Sarmiento	4	(0)
2017–2018	Defensa y Justicia	1	(0)
2018–2024	Estudiantes RC	41	(1)
2021–2022	→ Arsenal Sarandí (loan)	30	(1)
2022–2023	→ Talleres (loan)	54	(3)
2024–	Talleres	19	(0)
2025	→ Mamelodi Sundowns (loan)	11	(1)
2025	→ Liverpool M (loan)	12	(0)
2026–	→ Sarmiento (loan)	25	(1)

International career
2015	Argentina U20	2	(0)
- * Club domestic league appearances and goals as of 18:03, 10 November 2026 (UTC)

Lucas Matías Suárez Scalarea (born 17 March 1995) is an Argentine professional footballer who plays as a left-back for Sarmiento, on loan from Talleres.

== Career ==
=== Club ===
Suárez began his senior career in 2014 with Quilmes, after youth spells with them and Rosario Central. His professional debut arrived on 17 March 2014 in a 1–0 defeat to Lanús. Seven more appearances followed throughout 2013–14, prior to ten in 2014 and seven in 2015. In 2015, Suárez scored his first senior goal during a 2–1 victory over Vélez Sarsfield on 15 March. In the following season, 2016, he made just one appearance for Quilmes before departing the club to join fellow Primera División team Sarmiento. He made his debut for Sarmiento in December 2016 in a win away to former club Quilmes.

Three more appearances came during 2016–17. Ahead of the 2017–18 Argentine Primera División season, Suárez joined Defensa y Justicia. After being an unused substitute in a 4–4 draw against Gimnasia y Esgrima on 26 August 2017, he made his Defensa y Justicia debut on 24 September in a loss against Colón. That turned out to be his only match for the club as he departed in December 2017. He subsequently joined Torneo Federal A side Estudiantes in February 2018.

In February 2021, Suárez was loaned out to Arsenal de Sarandí until the end of the year. In January 2022, the loan deal was extended for one further year. The spell was cut short, and Suárez instead joined Talleres on 12 July 2022 on loan until the end of 2023 with a purchase option.

=== International ===
Suárez was called up to represent the Argentina U20s at the 2015 FIFA U-20 World Cup in New Zealand. He played in Group B matches against Panama and Ghana as Argentina failed to reach the knockout stages.

== Career statistics ==
As of 17 May 2018.

Club statistics
Club	Season	League			Cup (Note: Includes the Copa Argentina)		League Cup		Continental (Note: Includes the Copa Sudamericana)		Other		Total	
Club	Season	Division	Apps	Goals	Apps	Goals	Apps	Goals	Apps	Goals	Apps	Goals	Apps	Goals
Quilmes	2013–14	Primera División	8	0	0	0	—		—		0	0	8	0
Quilmes	2014	Primera División	10	0	0	0	—		—		0	0	10	0
Quilmes	2015	Primera División	7	1	0	0	—		—		0	0	7	1
Quilmes	2016	Primera División	1	0	0	0	—		—		0	0	1	0
Quilmes	Total		26	1	0	0	—		—		0	0	26	1
Sarmiento	2016–17	Primera División	4	0	0	0	—		—		0	0	4	0
Defensa y Justicia	2017–18	Primera División	1	0	0	0	—		0	0	0	0	1	0
Estudiantes	2017–18	Torneo Federal A	0	0	0	0	—		—		0	0	0	0
Career total			31	1	0	0	—		0	0	0	0	31	1
