= Guido Dal Casón =

Argentine footballer

Personal information
- Full name: Guido Walter Dal Casón
- Date of birth: 4 March 1993 (age 33)
- Place of birth: Quilmes, Argentina
- Height: 1.80 m (5 ft 11 in)
- Position: Forward

Team information
- Current team: Colegiales

Youth career
- 2007–2013: Quilmes

Senior career*
Years	Team	Apps	(Gls)
2013–2014	Quilmes		
2013–2014	→ Racing Club (loan)		
2015–2018	Defensa y Justicia		
2016–2017	→ All Boys (loan)		
2017–2018	→ Gimnasia y Esgrima (loan)		
2018	Massese		
2019	San Telmo		
2019	Macará		
2020–	Colegiales		

International career
2009	Argentina U17	1	(0)
- * Club domestic league appearances and goals as of 21:10, 25 May 2020 (UTC)

Guido Walter Dal Casón (born 4 March 1993) is an Argentine professional footballer who plays as a forward for Colegiales.

== Club career ==
Dal Casón spent time in the youth of Quilmes. He never featured for the first-team in the Argentine Primera División, but was loaned out between 2013 and 2014 to Uruguayan Primera División team Racing Club. He made his professional debut on 20 October 2013 against Juventud, before featuring again six days later vs. Sud América. Those were his only two appearances for Racing Club. In January 2015, Dal Casón joined fellow Primera División team Defensa y Justicia. His first appearance in the Argentine top-flight arrived on 27 September 2015 in a home loss to ex-club Quilmes. Two more games came.

On 22 August 2016, Dal Casón was loaned to All Boys of Primera B Nacional. He went onto score four goals in twenty-eight games for All Boys. Dal Casón departed Defensa in September 2017 to sign for Primera B Nacional side Gimnasia y Esgrima. He scored in his first start for the club, in a 2–0 win over Quilmes on 1 October. Five appearances after, he received the first red card of his career against Instituto. Dal Casón left his Gimnasia y Esgrima loan in July 2018. Later that year, Dal Casón moved to Italy to join Massese of Serie D. One appearance followed on 12 December versus Ghivizzano.

January 2019 saw Dal Casón sign for San Telmo in Primera B Metropolitana. He ended his first six months there with five goals in nineteen appearances as they reached the promotion play-off finals, though would lose to All Boys. On 1 July, Dal Casón headed off to Ecuador with Serie A outfit Macará.

== International career ==
Dal Casón played once for the Argentina U17s at the 2009 FIFA U-17 World Cup. Matías Sosa in a Group A game against hosts Nigeria.

== Career statistics ==
As of 10 July 2019.

Club statistics
Club	Season	League			Cup		Continental		Other		Total	
Club	Season	Division	Apps	Goals	Apps	Goals	Apps	Goals	Apps	Goals	Apps	Goals
Quilmes	2013–14	Argentine Primera División	0	0	0	0	—		0	0	0	0
Quilmes	2014	Argentine Primera División	0	0	0	0	—		0	0	0	0
Quilmes	Total		0	0	0	0	—		0	0	0	0
Racing Club (loan)	2013–14	Uruguayan Primera División	2	0	—		—		0	0	2	0
Racing Club (loan)	2014–15	Uruguayan Primera División	0	0	—		—		0	0	0	0
Racing Club (loan)	Total		2	0	—		—		0	0	2	0
Defensa y Justicia	2015	Argentine Primera División	3	0	1	0	—		0	0	4	0
Defensa y Justicia	2016	Argentine Primera División	0	0	0	0	—		0	0	0	0
Defensa y Justicia	2016–17	Argentine Primera División	0	0	0	0	0	0	0	0	0	0
Defensa y Justicia	2017–18	Argentine Primera División	0	0	0	0	0	0	0	0	0	0
Defensa y Justicia	Total		3	0	1	0	0	0	0	0	4	0
All Boys (loan)	2016–17	Primera B Nacional	28	4	0	0	—		0	0	28	4
Gimnasia y Esgrima (loan)	2017–18	Primera B Nacional	9	1	0	0	—		0	0	9	1
Massese	2018–19	Serie D	1	0	0	0	—		0	0	1	0
San Telmo	2018–19	Primera B Metropolitana	15	5	0	0	—		4 (Note: Appearance(s) in Primera B Metropolitana play-offs)	0	19	5
Macará	2019	Serie A	0	0	0	0	0	0	0	0	0	0
Career total			58	10	1	0	0	0	4	0	63	10
