= Daniel González (footballer, born 1991) =

Argentine footballer

Personal information
- Full name: Daniel Alberto González
- Date of birth: 26 January 1991 (age 35)
- Place of birth: General Rodríguez, Argentina
- Height: 1.82 m (5 ft 11 1/2 in)
- Position: Left midfielder

Team information
- Current team: Mitre

Senior career*
Years	Team	Apps	(Gls)
2008–2014	Fénix de Pilar	158	(13)
2014–2015	Godoy Cruz	15	(0)
2015–2016	San Martín SJ	18	(1)
2016–2017	Temperley	12	(0)
2017–2019	Defensa y Justicia	1	(0)
2018–2019	→ Mitre (loan)	34	(3)
2019–2020	Dorados de Sinaloa	19	(2)
2020–2021	Nueva Chicago	4	(0)
2021	San Martín T.	26	(1)
2022–	Mitre	23	(2)
- * Club domestic league appearances and goals as of 18:45, 31 July 2022 (UTC)

Daniel Alberto González (born 26 January 1991) is an Argentine professional footballer who plays as a left midfielder for Mitre.

== Career ==
González began his senior career in 2008 with Fénix in Primera C. Three years into his career, the club were relegated to the 2011–12 Primera D; a season that González scored six goals in thirty games in. Back-to-back promotions followed from Primera D to Primera B Metropolitana. In Primera B Metropolitana, González made his professional debut on 13 August 2013 in a loss to Temperley. He scored his first senior goal in October vs. Flandria. He made thirty-nine appearances and scored twice in 2013–14. On 1 July 2014, González joined Argentine Primera División side Godoy Cruz. Fifteen appearances followed over two seasons.

In July 2015, González signed for fellow Primera División team San Martín. His debut came on 19 July against Huracán. He played five times during 2015, before featuring thirteen times in 2016; in his first appearance of 2016, González scored his first San Martín goal in a 2–2 draw away to Racing Club. One year after joining San Martín, in July 2016, González made a move to join Temperley. After twelve matches in 2016–17, he left to play for Defensa y Justicia. His first appearance for Defensa came during the 2017 Copa Sudamericana versus Chapecoense on 25 July. In early 2018, González joined Mitre of Primera B Nacional on loan.

González, after three goals in thirty-four matches with Mitre across eighteen months, headed off abroad for the first time in June 2019 by agreeing terms with Dorados de Sinaloa of Ascenso MX. His debut arrived in a league win away to Tampico Madero on 2 August, which preceded González notching his first goal on 13 August during a Copa MX encounter with Necaxa.

== Career statistics ==
As of 14 August 2019.

Club statistics
Club	Season	League			Cup		League Cup		Continental		Other		Total	
Club	Season	Division	Apps	Goals	Apps	Goals	Apps	Goals	Apps	Goals	Apps	Goals	Apps	Goals
Defensa y Justicia	2017–18	Primera División	1	0	0	0	—		1 (Note: Appearance(s) in the Copa Sudamericana)	0	0	0	2	0
Defensa y Justicia	2018–19	Primera División	0	0	0	0	0	0	0	0	0	0	0	0
Defensa y Justicia	Total		1	0	0	0	0	0	1	0	0	0	2	0
Mitre (loan)	2017–18	Primera B Nacional	11	1	0	0	—		—		0	0	11	1
Mitre (loan)	2018–19	Primera B Nacional	23	2	0	0	—		—		0	0	23	2
Mitre (loan)	Total		34	3	0	0	—		—		0	0	34	3
Dorados de Sinaloa	2019–20	Ascenso MX	2	0	2	1	—		—		0	0	4	1
Career total			37	3	2	1	0	0	1	0	0	0	40	4

== Honours ==
Fénix

- Primera D: 2011–12
