= Estadio Único de San Nicolás =

Football stadium in San Nicolás de los Arroyos, Argentina

Unique Stadium of San Nicolás
- Estadio Único de San Nicolás
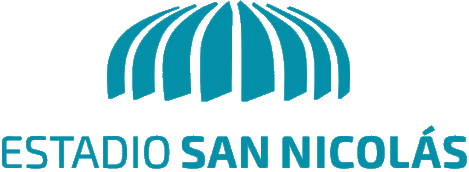
- Interactive map of Unique Stadium of San Nicolás
- Address: Av. Rucci y Av. Damaso Valdez; San Nicolás; Argentina
- Coordinates: 33.3439°S 60.2644°W
- Owner: Municipality of San Nicolás
- Operator: AFA; Liga Nicoleña de Fútbol
- Capacity: 25,000 (sports); 35,000 (concerts)
- Type: Stadium
- Surface: Grass
- Parking: Yes

Construction
- Opened: 19 October 2019; 6 years ago

Tenants
- Copa Argentina clubs Liga Nicoleña clubs

Website
- estadiosannicolas.com.ar

Estadio Único de San Nicolás is a football stadium located in the city San Nicolás de los Arroyos in the homonymous partido of Buenos Aires Province, Argentina. Owned by the local Municipality and inaugurated in 2019, it is the main stadium in the region.

The stadium is located on km 234 of National Route 9 (also known as the "Buenos Aires–Rosario Highway") and has a capacity of 25,000 spectators (sporting events) and 35,000 (other events). The stadium has also a lighting system equipped with LED devices.

== Overview ==
Construction works began in September 2014 and the stadium was inaugurated on 19 October 2019 with a huge celebration that included music concerts, dances, and acrobatics. The first official match was the final of Liga Nicoleña de Fútbol (the regional governing body of San Nicolás Partido) that same year. with the purpose of fitting the regulations of AFA (AFA) and Argentine Rugby Union (UAR) in order to be able to host football and rugby union matches.

The stadium host matches organised by Liga Nicoleña, and has been frequent venue of Copa Argentina group matches (since the 2019–20 edition) due to its location, that allows teams from centre and north of Argentina to travel shorter distances. Estadio Único has also served as venue for some Primera Nacional (the second division of Argentine football) matches.

In September 2023 the friendly match between River Plate and Chilean club Universidad Católica was held in Estadio Único, while the first official Primera División match played there was on 9 December 2023, when Platense defeated Godoy Cruz 6–5 on penalties in the 2023 Copa de la Liga semifinal.
