= Pablo Bueno =

Argentine footballer (born 1990)

Personal information
- Full name: Pablo Sebastián Bueno
- Date of birth: 30 March 1990 (age 36)
- Place of birth: General Roca, Argentina
- Height: 1.81 m (5 ft 11 in)
- Position: Forward

Team information
- Current team: Los Chankas
- Number: 27

Youth career
- CAI
- Defensa y Justicia

Senior career*
Years	Team	Apps	(Gls)
2009–2018	Defensa y Justicia	21	(5)
2012	→ Flandria (loan)	19	(7)
2012–2013	→ Flandria (loan)	37	(7)
2013–2014	→ Defensores de Belgrano (loan)	39	(8)
2014	→ Platense (loan)	18	(4)
2015	→ Gimnasia y Esgrima (loan)	33	(4)
2016–2017	→ Flandria (loan)	54	(8)
2017–2018	→ Flandria (loan)	17	(1)
2018–2019	Almirante Brown	33	(9)
2019–2021	Jaguares de Córdoba	46	(8)
2021–2023	Alianza Petrolera	63	(14)
2024	Sport Boys	29	(11)
2025-	Los Chankas	34	(9)
- * Club domestic league appearances and goals as of 30 December 2025

Pablo Sebastián Bueno (born 30 March 1990) is an Argentine professional footballer who plays as a forward for Los Chankas.

== Career ==
Bueno's youth career was spent with CAI and Defensa y Justicia. He made his professional debut for the latter in March 2009, during a goalless draw with Quilmes in Primera B Nacional. Five appearances later, Bueno scored his first senior goal in 2–1 defeat to Tiro Federal. A total of twenty-one appearances and five goals arrived over the next four seasons for Defensa y Justicia. In January 2012, Bueno joined Primera B Metropolitana side Flandria on loan. He scored on his debut against Estudiantes on 28 January, which was the first of seven goals in nineteen appearances for Flandria.

He rejoined Flandria for a second loan for the 2012–13 season. He went onto again score seven goals, in thirty-seven games, as the club finished 15th. In June 2013, Bueno was loaned to Defensores de Belgrano. Eight goals in thirty-nine appearances occurred. Subsequent loans to Platense (Primera B Metropolitana) and Gimnasia y Esgrima (Primera B Nacional) followed where he played a total of fifty-one matches and scored eight times. On 1 January 2016, Bueno rejoined Flandria on loan again. Two goals in seventeen games came during 2016, a season concluded ended with promotion.

Bueno returned to Defensa in July 2017 prior to immediately rejoining Flandria on loan for a fourth time in August. After finishing his loan with Flandria, Bueno left Defensa y Justicia permanently to sign for Almirante Brown on 30 June 2018. He made his bow in a 2–0 loss to Estudiantes on 20 August, before netting his opening goal against San Telmo on 29 August. Eight goals, including two over Deportivo Español, followed in thirty-three total matches. In June 2019, Bueno agreed terms with Jaguares de Córdoba of Colombia's Categoría Primera A. His debut arrived versus Unión Magdalena on 13 July.

== Career statistics ==
As of 21 July 2019.

Club statistics
Club	Season	League			Cup		League Cup		Continental		Other		Total	
Club	Season	Division	Apps	Goals	Apps	Goals	Apps	Goals	Apps	Goals	Apps	Goals	Apps	Goals
Defensa y Justicia	2008–09	Primera B Nacional	9	1	0	0	—		—		0	0	9	1
Defensa y Justicia	2009–10	Primera B Nacional	5	2	0	0	—		—		0	0	5	2
Defensa y Justicia	2010–11	Primera B Nacional	6	2	0	0	—		—		0	0	6	2
Defensa y Justicia	2011–12	Primera B Nacional	1	0	1	0	—		—		0	0	2	0
Defensa y Justicia	2012–13	Primera B Nacional	0	0	0	0	—		—		0	0	0	0
Defensa y Justicia	2013–14	Primera B Nacional	0	0	0	0	—		—		0	0	0	0
Defensa y Justicia	2014	Primera División	0	0	0	0	—		—		0	0	0	0
Defensa y Justicia	2015	Primera División	0	0	0	0	—		—		0	0	0	0
Defensa y Justicia	2016	Primera División	0	0	0	0	—		—		0	0	0	0
Defensa y Justicia	2016–17	Primera División	0	0	0	0	—		0	0	0	0	0	0
Defensa y Justicia	2017–18	Primera División	0	0	0	0	—		0	0	0	0	0	0
Defensa y Justicia	Total		21	5	1	0	—		0	0	0	0	22	5
Flandria (loan)	2011–12	Primera B Metropolitana	19	7	0	0	—		—		0	0	19	7
Flandria (loan)	2012–13	Primera B Metropolitana	37	7	1	0	—		—		0	0	38	7
Flandria (loan)	Total		56	14	1	0	—		—		0	0	57	14
Defensores de Belgrano (loan)	2013–14	Primera B Metropolitana	39	8	2	1	—		—		0	0	41	9
Platense (loan)	2014	Primera B Metropolitana	18	4	1	0	—		—		0	0	19	4
Gimnasia y Esgrima (loan)	2015	Primera B Nacional	33	4	0	0	—		—		0	0	3	4
Flandria (loan)	2016	Primera B Metropolitana	17	2	0	0	—		—		0	0	17	2
Flandria (loan)	2016–17	Primera B Nacional	37	6	0	0	—		—		0	0	37	6
Flandria (loan)	2017–18	Primera B Nacional	17	1	0	0	—		—		0	0	17	1
Flandria (loan)	Total		71	9	0	0	—		—		0	0	71	9
Almirante Brown	2018–19	Primera B Metropolitana	33	9	0	0	—		—		0	0	33	9
Jaguares de Córdoba	2019	Categoría Primera A	2	0	0	0	—		—		0	0	2	0
Career total			273	53	5	1	—		0	0	0	0	278	54

== Honours ==
Flandria

- Primera B Metropolitana: 2016
