= Jonathan Requena =

Argentine footballer

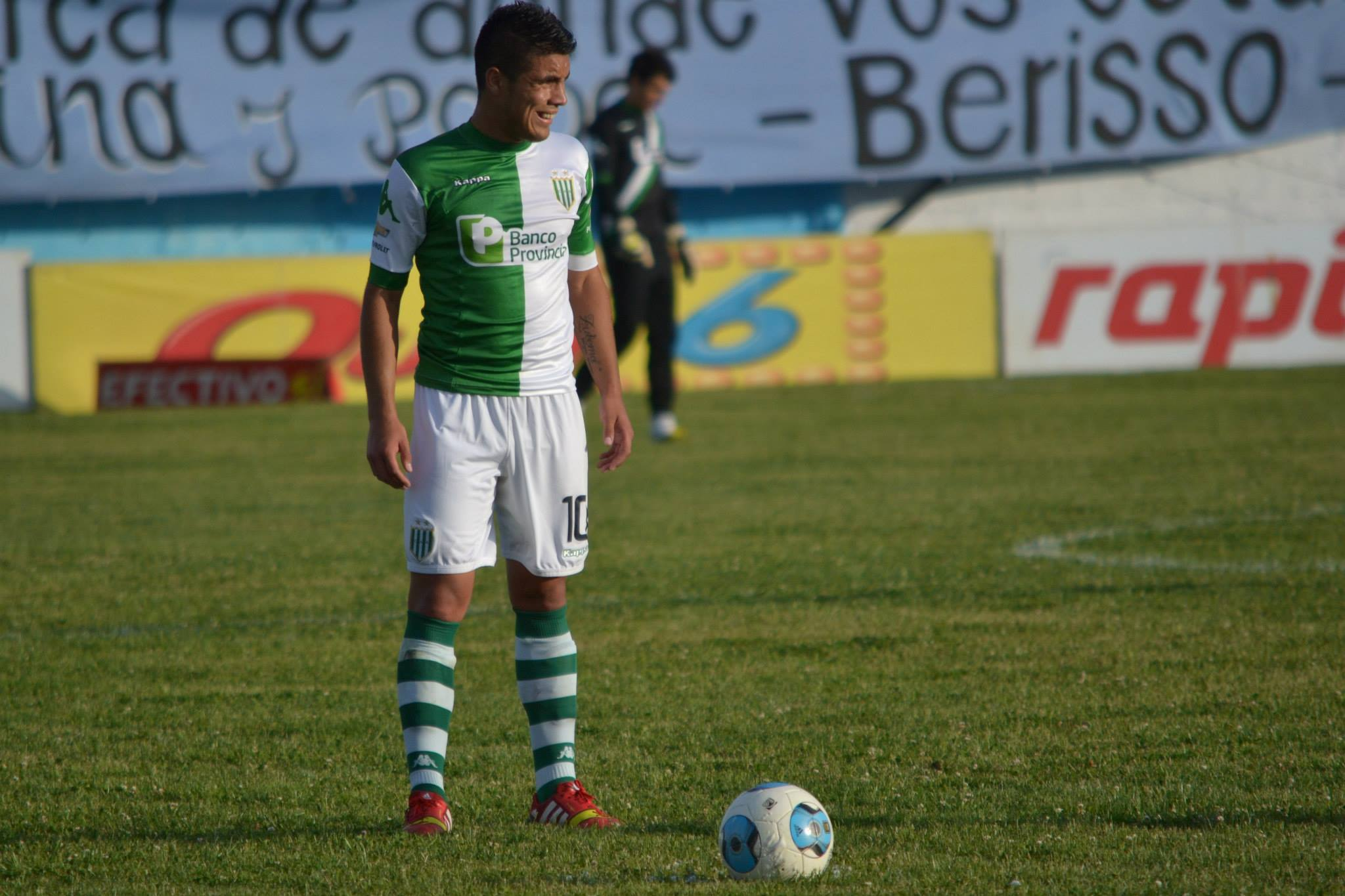

Personal information
- Full name: Jonathan Iván Requena
- Date of birth: 11 June 1996 (age 30)
- Place of birth: Córdoba, Argentina
- Height: 1.74 m (5 ft 8 1/2 in)
- Position: Midfielder

Team information
- Current team: Valletta FC

Youth career
- Banfield

Senior career*
Years	Team	Apps	(Gls)
2013–2017	Banfield	38	(2)
2016	→ Atlanta (loan)	5	(0)
2017–2018	Defensa y Justicia	0	(0)
2018–2019	Deportes Temuco	19	(2)
2019	River Plate	16	(1)
2020	Valletta FC		
- * Club domestic league appearances and goals

Jonathan Iván Requena (born 11 June 1996) is an Argentine professional footballer who plays as a midfielder.

== Career ==
Requena's first club was Banfield of Primera B Nacional. He made his professional debut on 2 February 2013 in a 2–2 draw with one of his future clubs in Defensa y Justicia. His next appearance for Banfield came in the Copa Argentina on 13 March, he scored the winning goal in a 2–1 win against Central Norte. He netted his first league goal in the following October versus Aldosivi, in a season that ended in promotion to the Argentine Primera División as title winners. He went onto score one goal in twelve games in the top-flight. On 26 January 2016, Requena joined Primera B Metropolitana club Atlanta on loan for six months.

In total, he made five appearances in the 2016 Primera B Metropolitana before returning to Banfield. On 14 August 2017, Requena joined Primera División team Defensa y Justicia. He departed in July 2018 following zero first-team appearances for the club, subsequently signing for Deportes Temuco of the Chilean Primera División. His debut arrived on 26 July in the Copa Sudamericana against San Lorenzo, a match that they ended with a victory but one that was later awarded as a 3–0 defeat as Requena was deemed ineligible. Temuco were relegated later that year, with Requena leaving midway through the next campaign.

In June 2019, Requena switched Chile for Paraguay by agreeing terms with River Plate. After an opening game versus Guaraní on 12 July, Requena scored his first goal for the Asunción club in his second appearance during a 2–2 draw with Sol de América on 21 July.

In November 2020, Requena signed an initial one-year deal to join Valletta FC in Malta's BOV Premier Division.

== Career statistics ==
As of 17 September 2020.

Club statistics
Club	Season	League			Cup		Continental		Other		Total	
Club	Season	Division	Apps	Goals	Apps	Goals	Apps	Goals	Apps	Goals	Apps	Goals
Banfield	2012–13	Primera B Nacional	3	0	1	1	—		0	0	4	1
Banfield	2013–14	Primera B Nacional	23	1	1	0	—		0	0	24	1
Banfield	2014	Argentine Primera División	6	1	0	0	—		0	0	6	1
Banfield	2015	Argentine Primera División	6	0	1	0	—		0	0	7	0
Banfield	2016	Argentine Primera División	0	0	0	0	—		0	0	0	0
Banfield	2016–17	Argentine Primera División	0	0	0	0	0	0	0	0	0	0
Banfield	Total		38	2	3	1	0	0	0	0	41	3
Atlanta (loan)	2016	Primera B Metropolitana	5	0	0	0	—		0	0	5	0
Defensa y Justicia	2017–18	Argentine Primera División	0	0	0	0	0	0	0	0	0	0
Deportes Temuco	2018	Chilean Primera División	11	0	0	0	1 (Note: Appearance(s) in Copa Sudamericana)	0	0	0	12	0
Deportes Temuco	2019	Primera B	8	2	1	0	—		0	0	9	2
Deportes Temuco	Total		19	2	1	0	1	0	0	0	21	2
River Plate	2019	Paraguayan Primera División	16	1	0	0	—		0	0	16	1
Career total			78	5	4	1	1	0	0	0	83	6

== Honours ==
Banfield

- Primera B Nacional: 2013–14
