= Nahuel Rodríguez (footballer, born 1992) =

Argentine footballer

Personal information
- Full name: Nahuel Crispiniano Rodríguez
- Date of birth: 20 November 1992 (age 33)
- Place of birth: Puerto Iguazú, Argentina
- Position: Midfielder

Team information
- Current team: Achirense

Youth career
- Boca Juniors

Senior career*
Years	Team	Apps	(Gls)
2013–2017	Douglas Haig	81	(3)
2017–	Achirense	20	(1)
- * Club domestic league appearances and goals as of 19:08, 9 October 2018 (UTC)

Nahuel Crispiniano Rodríguez (born 20 November 1992) is an Argentine footballer who plays as a midfielder for Achirense.

== Career ==
Rodríguez's career began in 2013 with Primera B Nacional side Douglas Haig, he had previously been in the Boca Juniors youth system; featuring in the 2012 U-20 Copa Libertadores in Peru. Rodríguez made his professional debut on 14 August 2013 during a draw with Talleres, which occurred during the 2013–14 season which he finished with one goal, versus Defensa y Justicia in their penultimate fixture, in twenty matches. In total, Rodríguez stayed for four years whilst making eighty-one appearances and scoring three goals. Douglas Haig were relegated in his final campaign. In 2017, Torneo Federal B side Achirense signed Rodríguez.

== Career statistics ==
As of 9 October 2018.

Club statistics
Club	Season	League			Cup (Note: Includes the Copa Argentina)		League Cup		Continental		Other		Total	
Club	Season	Division	Apps	Goals	Apps	Goals	Apps	Goals	Apps	Goals	Apps	Goals	Apps	Goals
Douglas Haig	2013–14	Primera B Nacional	20	1	0	0	—		—		0	0	20	1
Douglas Haig	2014	Primera B Nacional	15	0	1	0	—		—		0	0	16	0
Douglas Haig	2015	Primera B Nacional	33	2	1	0	—		—		0	0	34	2
Douglas Haig	2016	Primera B Nacional	11	0	1	0	—		—		0	0	12	0
Douglas Haig	2016–17	Primera B Nacional	2	0	0	0	—		—		0	0	2	0
Douglas Haig	Total		81	3	3	0	—		—		0	0	84	3
Achirense	2017	Torneo Federal B	20	1	0	0	—		—		0	0	20	1
Career total			101	4	3	0	—		—		0	0	104	4
