= Santiago López (footballer, born 1991) =

Uruguayan footballer

Personal information
- Full name: Santiago López Otero
- Date of birth: 16 June 1991 (age 35)
- Place of birth: Montevideo, Uruguay
- Height: 1.71 m (5 ft 7 1/2 in)
- Position: Midfielder

Senior career*
Years	Team	Apps	(Gls)
2009–2014	Central Español	9	(0)
- * Club domestic league appearances and goals

Santiago López Otero (born 16 June 1991) is a Uruguayan footballer who plays as a midfielder. He is currently a free agent.

== Career ==
López's career began in 2009 with Central Español. He made his professional debut in the Uruguayan Primera División on 13 December 2009, featuring for the final thirty minutes as a second-half substitute. He made four further appearances throughout 2009–10 for Central Español. López's next appearance came four seasons later, in a Uruguayan Segunda División defeat to Villa Teresa in May 2014. He played three more times in the following campaign of 2014–15, prior to departing the club midway through it in December.

== Career statistics ==
As of 24 April 2018.

Club statistics
Club	Season	League			Cup		League Cup		Continental		Other		Total	
Club	Season	Division	Apps	Goals	Apps	Goals	Apps	Goals	Apps	Goals	Apps	Goals	Apps	Goals
Central Español	2009–10	Primera División	5	0	—		—		—		0	0	5	0
Central Español	2010–11	Primera División	0	0	—		—		—		0	0	0	0
Central Español	2011–12	Segunda División	0	0	—		—		—		0	0	0	0
Central Español	2012–13	Primera División	0	0	—		—		—		0	0	0	0
Central Español	2013–14	Segunda División	1	0	—		—		—		0	0	1	0
Central Español	2014–15	Segunda División	3	0	—		—		—		0	0	3	0
Career total			9	0	—		—		—		0	0	9	0
