= Matías Sosa (footballer, born 1995) =

Argentine footballer

Personal information
- Full name: Matías Andrés Sosa
- Date of birth: 6 July 1995 (age 31)
- Place of birth: Buenos Aires, Argentina
- Position: Midfielder

Team information
- Current team: Talleres (RdE)

Youth career
- Defensa y Justicia

Senior career*
Years	Team	Apps	(Gls)
2015–2019	Defensa y Justicia	2	(0)
2018	→ Atlanta (loan)	7	(0)
2018–2019	→ Brown (loan)	5	(0)
2019–	Talleres (RdE)	12	(1)
- * Club domestic league appearances and goals as of 15:11, 27 November 2019 (UTC)

Matías Andrés Sosa (born 6 July 1995) is an Argentine professional footballer who plays as a midfielder for Talleres de Remedios de Escalada.

== Career ==
After being an unused substitute on two occasions in 2015 and 2016 versus Godoy Cruz and Unión Santa Fe, Sosa made his professional debut on 21 June 2017 in the league against Temperley; prior to making another appearance days later in a 1–0 win over Gimnasia y Esgrima. In the following August, he scored the first goal of his senior career in a Copa Argentina victory away to Temperley. On 1 January 2018, Sosa joined Primera B Metropolitana side Atlanta on loan. His first match for Atlanta arrived on 3 February in a 2–1 defeat to Platense. A loan move to Brown followed in September.

== Career statistics ==
As of 10 March 2019.

Club statistics
Club	Season	League			Cup		Continental		Other		Total	
Club	Season	Division	Apps	Goals	Apps	Goals	Apps	Goals	Apps	Goals	Apps	Goals
Defensa y Justicia	2015	Primera División	0	0	0	0	0	0	0	0	0	0
Defensa y Justicia	2016	Primera División	0	0	0	0	0	0	0	0	0	0
Defensa y Justicia	2016–17	Primera División	2	0	0	0	0	0	0	0	2	0
Defensa y Justicia	2017–18	Primera División	0	0	1	1	1 (Note: Appearance(s) in the Copa Sudamericana)	0	0	0	2	1
Defensa y Justicia	2018–19	Primera División	0	0	0	0	0	0	0	0	0	0
Defensa y Justicia	Total		2	0	1	1	1	0	0	0	4	1
Atlanta (loan)	2017–18	Primera B Metropolitana	7	0	0	0	—		0	0	7	0
Brown (loan)	2018–19	Primera B Nacional	2	0	0	0	—		0	0	2	0
Career total			11	0	1	1	1	0	0	0	13	1
