= Ramiro Maldonado =

Argentine footballer (born 1991)

Personal information
- Full name: Ramiro Osvaldo Maldonado
- Date of birth: 20 July 1991 (age 35)
- Place of birth: Rosario, Argentina
- Height: 1.74 m (5 ft 9 in)
- Position: Forward

Team information
- Current team: Antigua
- Number: 10

Senior career*
Years	Team	Apps	(Gls)
2013–2015	Sportivo Las Parejas	59	(16)
2016–2017	Gimnasia Jujuy	37	(5)
2017–2018	Boca Unidos	19	(3)
2018–2019	Central Córdoba SdE	4	(0)
2019	Villa Mitre	9	(1)
2019–2020	Deportivo Madryn	10	(1)
2020	Santos de Nasca	8	(3)
2021	Independiente Rivadavia	21	(1)
2022	Sant Julià	15	(7)
2022	Universitario de Sucre	16	(1)
2023-	Antigua	0	(0)
- * Club domestic league appearances and goals as of 15:38, 15 August 2022 (UTC)

Ramiro Osvaldo Maldonado (born 20 July 1991) is an Argentine professional footballer who plays as a forward for Liga Nacional club Antigua.

== Career ==
Sportivo Las Parejas were Maldonado's first club. In his second season with the fourth tier team, 2014, they won promotion to Torneo Federal A for the 2015 campaign; with the forward having scored eight goals in thirty-four matches since the start of 2013–14; a further eight goals followed in Torneo Federal A. January 2016 saw Maldonado join Primera B Nacional side Gimnasia y Esgrima. He scored five goals in thirty-eight fixtures in all competitions across two campaigns. After a one-season stint with Boca Unidos in 2017–18, which ended with relegation, Maldonado joined Primera B Nacional's Central Córdoba on 30 June 2018.

== Career statistics ==
As of 7 December 2018.

Club statistics
Club	Season	League			Cup (Note: Includes the Copa Argentina)		League Cup		Continental		Other		Total	
Club	Season	Division	Apps	Goals	Apps	Goals	Apps	Goals	Apps	Goals	Apps	Goals	Apps	Goals
Sportivo Las Parejas	2015	Torneo Federal A	25	8	0	0	—		—		1 (Note: One appearance in the 2015 Torneo Federal A play-offs)	0	26	8
Gimnasia y Esgrima	2016	Primera B Nacional	11	3	1	0	—		—		0	0	12	3
Gimnasia y Esgrima	2016–17	Primera B Nacional	26	2	0	0	—		—		0	0	26	2
Gimnasia y Esgrima	Total		37	5	1	0	—		—		0	0	38	5
Boca Unidos	2017–18	Primera B Nacional	19	3	0	0	—		—		0	0	19	3
Central Córdoba	2018–19	Primera B Nacional	4	0	0	0	—		—		0	0	4	0
Career total			85	16	1	0	—		—		1	0	87	16
