= Maximiliano Rodríguez (footballer, born 1999) =

Uruguayan footballer

Personal information
- Full name: Maximiliano Jair Rodríguez Cejas
- Date of birth: 6 June 1999 (age 27)
- Place of birth: Paysandú, Uruguay
- Height: 1.74 m (5 ft 9 in)
- Position: Midfielder

Team information
- Current team: Tacuarembó
- Number: 20

Youth career
- Danubio

Senior career*
Years	Team	Apps	(Gls)
2018–2022	Danubio	48	(0)
2022	→ Sud América (loan)	26	(1)
2023	Rampla Juniors	12	(0)
2023	Deportes La Serena	13	(0)
2024–	Tacuarembó	3	(0)

International career
2017	Uruguay U18	1	(0)
- * Club domestic league appearances and goals as of 13 September 2024

Maximiliano Jair Rodríguez Cejas (born 6 June 1999) is a Uruguayan footballer who plays as a midfielder for Tacuarembó.

== Club career ==
Born in Paysandú, Uruguay, Rodríguez started his career with Danubio, spending four seasons with them. In 2022, he was loaned out Sud América.

In March 2023, he joined Rampla Juniors. In the second half of the same year, he moved to Chile and joined Deportes La Serena.

== International career ==
Rodríguez represented Uruguay at under-18 level in a friendly match against United States on 5 June 2017 and later took part in the under 20's.
