= Thomas Amilivia =

Argentine footballer

Personal information
- Full name: Thomas Damián Amilivia
- Date of birth: 13 July 1998 (age 28)
- Place of birth: Ciudad Evita, Argentina
- Position: Forward

Team information
- Current team: Güemes

Senior career*
Years	Team	Apps	(Gls)
2015	Sportivo Italiano	4	(1)
2016–2023	Argentinos Juniors	2	(0)
2020	→ Deportivo Español (loan)	7	(0)
2021	→ San Telmo (loan)	29	(6)
2022	→ Santiago Wanderers (loan)	26	(5)
2023–2024	Santiago Wanderers	0	(0)
2023	→ All Boys (loan)	21	(6)
2024–2025	Tristán Suárez	7	(1)
2025–2026	Alvarado	20	(1)
2026–	Güemes	10	(0)
- * Club domestic league appearances and goals as of 17:04, 29 April 2026 (UTC)

Thomas Damián Amilivia (born 13 July 1998) is an Argentine professional footballer who plays as a forward for Güemes.

== Career ==
Amilivia began his career with Sportivo Italiano. He was promoted into the club's first-team during the 2015 campaign, making his professional debut on 20 October against Deportivo Español; prior to netting his first goal two appearances later in a 2–1 defeat to Atlanta on 8 November. In 2016, Amilivia completed a move to Argentine Primera División side Argentinos Juniors. His first involvement with their senior squad arrived on 9 December 2018, as the forward was on the substitutes bench for a fixture with Aldosivi; he subsequently made his bow after being substituted on in place of Matías Romero for the final seconds of a home loss.

== Career statistics ==
As of 10 December 2018.

Club statistics
Club	Season	League			Cup (Note: Includes the Copa Argentina)		League Cup		Continental (Note: Includes the Copa Libertadores and Copa Sudamericana)		Other		Total	
Club	Season	Division	Apps	Goals	Apps	Goals	Apps	Goals	Apps	Goals	Apps	Goals	Apps	Goals
Sportivo Italiano	2015	Primera B Metropolitana	4	1	0	0	—		—		0	0	4	1
Argentinos Juniors	2016	Primera División	0	0	0	0	—		—		0	0	0	0
Argentinos Juniors	2016–17	Primera B Nacional	0	0	0	0	—		—		0	0	0	0
Argentinos Juniors	2017–18	Primera División	0	0	0	0	—		—		0	0	0	0
Argentinos Juniors	2018–19	Primera División	1	0	0	0	—		—		0	0	1	0
Argentinos Juniors	Total		1	0	0	0	—		—		0	0	1	0
Career total			5	1	0	0	—		—		0	0	5	1
