= Santiago López (footballer, born 1992) =

Mexican footballer

Personal information
- Full name: Santiago López Cortés
- Date of birth: 18 June 1992 (age 34)
- Place of birth: Mexico City, Mexico
- Height: 1.67 m (5 ft 5 1/2 in)
- Position: Midfielder

Youth career
- Inter Playa del Carmen

Senior career*
Years	Team	Apps	(Gls)
2008–2011	Inter Playa del Carmen	41	(3)
2011–2013	Atlante	0	(0)
2013–2014	Inter Playa del Carmen	13	(1)
- * Club domestic league appearances and goals

Santiago López Cortés (born 18 June 1992) is a Mexican footballer who plays as a midfielder. He is currently a free agent.

== Career ==
López started in the youth ranks of Inter Playa del Carmen, before being promoted into the first-team in September 2008. He subsequently made twenty-three appearances in his debut season in Liga Premier de México. On 2 October 2010, he scored his first senior goal in a draw away to Itzaes. In three years with the club, he featured forty-one times and scored three goals. In 2011, Mexican Primera División side Atlante signed López. For the 2011–12 season, López made eighteen appearances for the U20 team. He eventually made his Atlante debut on 2 August 2012 in a Copa MX match with La Piedad.

He made a total of six appearances for Atlante in the Copa MX during 2012–13. 2013 saw López leave Atlante and return to Inter Playa del Carmen of Liga Premier, subsequently scoring once in thirteen games in 2013–14. He left the club at the conclusion of 2013–14.

== Career statistics ==
As of 24 April 2018.

Club statistics
Club	Season	League			Cup (Note: Includes the Copa MX)		League Cup		Continental		Other		Total	
Club	Season	Division	Apps	Goals	Apps	Goals	Apps	Goals	Apps	Goals	Apps	Goals	Apps	Goals
Inter Playa del Carmen	2008–09	Liga Premier	23	0	0	0	—		—		0	0	23	0
Inter Playa del Carmen	2009–10	Liga Premier	0	0	0	0	—		—		0	0	0	0
Inter Playa del Carmen	2010–11	Liga Premier	18	3	0	0	—		—		0	0	18	3
Inter Playa del Carmen	Total		41	3	0	0	—		—		0	0	41	3
Atlante	2011–12	Liga MX	0	0	0	0	—		—		0	0	0	0
Atlante	2012–13	Liga MX	0	0	6	0	—		—		0	0	6	0
Atlante	Total		0	0	6	0	—		—		0	0	6	0
Inter Playa del Carmen	2013–14	Liga Premier	13	1	0	0	—		—		0	0	13	1
Career total			54	4	6	0	—		—		0	0	60	4
