= José Ramírez (footballer, born 1990) =

Colombian footballer (born 1990)

Personal information
- Full name: José Gabriel Ramírez Agudelo
- Date of birth: 18 September 1990 (age 36)
- Place of birth: Envigado, Colombia
- Position: Defender

Senior career*
Years	Team	Apps	(Gls)
2012–2013	Nueva Chicago	15	(0)
2013–2014	Arsenal de Sarandí	0	(0)
2014–2015	Nueva Chicago	15	(1)
2016–2019	Fénix	88	(2)
2019–2020	San Telmo	23	(2)
2020–2021	Deportivo Riestra	24	(2)
2022	Patriotas Boyacá	35	(3)
2023	Atlético Huila	10	(1)
2023	Independiente Santa Fe	1	(0)
- * Club domestic league appearances and goals

José Gabriel Ramírez Agudelo (born September 18, 1990) is a Colombian footballer.
