= 2017–18 Defensa y Justicia season =

Defensa y Justicia
2017–18 season
- Chairman: José Lemme
- Manager: Nelson Vivas (until 24 September 2017); Manuel Fernández (int.) (from 24 September 2017 to 8 October 2017); Juan Vojvoda (from 8 October 2017)
- Stadium: Estadio Norberto "Tito" Tomaghello
- Primera División: 10th
- 2016–17 Copa Argentina: Round of 16
- 2017–18 Copa Argentina: Round of 64
- 2017 Copa Sudamericana: Second stage
- 2018 Copa Sudamericana: First stage
- Top goalscorer: League: Nicolás Fernández (7); All: Nicolás Fernández (7)

The 2017–18 season is Defensa y Justicia's 5th consecutive season in the top-flight of Argentine football. The season covers the period from 1 July 2017 to 30 June 2018.

== Current squad ==
As of 3 September 2017.

Note: Flags indicate national team as defined under FIFA eligibility rules; some limited exceptions apply. Players may hold more than one non-FIFA nationality.

No.	Pos.	Nation	Player
1	GK	ARG	Lucio Chiappero
4	DF	ARG	Rafael Barrios
5	MF	ARG	Luis Jerez Silva (on loan from Godoy Cruz)
7	FW	ARG	Juan Kaprof (on loan from River Plate)
8	MF	URU	Ignacio Rivero
10	MF	ARG	Hernán Fredes
12	GK	ARG	Ezequiel Unsain
18	DF	ARG	Pablo Alvarado
20	DF	ARG	Rafael Delgado
21	GK	ARG	Gabriel Arias
28	MF	ARG	Tomás Pochettino (on loan from Boca Juniors)
31	MF	ARG	Gonzalo Castellani (on loan from Boca Juniors)
33	MF	ARG	Leonel Miranda
34	MF	ARG	Matías Sosa
35	MF	ARG	Mariano Bareiro (on loan from Racing Club)
—	MF	ARG	Adrián Cubas (on loan from Boca Juniors)

No.	Pos.	Nation	Player
—	FW	ARG	Ciro Rius
—	MF	ARG	Diego Venturi
—	DF	SUI	Dylan Gissi
—	FW	ARG	Fabián Bordagaray (on loan from Rosario Central)
—	FW	ARG	Facundo Melivilo (on loan from Chacarita Juniors)
—	FW	ARG	Fernando Márquez (on loan from Belgrano)
—	MF	ARG	Franco Cristaldo (on loan from Boca Juniors)
—	FW	ARG	Gonzalo Díaz
—	FW	ARG	Guido Dal Casón
—	FW	ARG	Horacio Tijanovich (on loan from Gimnasia y Esgrima)
—	MF	ARG	Jonathan Requena (on loan from Banfield)
—	DF	URU	Leandro Zazpe (on loan from Juventud)
—	DF	ARG	Lisandro Martínez (on loan from Newell's Old Boys)
—	DF	ARG	Lucas Suárez
—	MF	ARG	Nahuel Cisneros (on loan from Boca Juniors)

=== Out on loan ===
Note: Flags indicate national team as defined under FIFA eligibility rules; some limited exceptions apply. Players may hold more than one non-FIFA nationality.

No.	Pos.	Nation	Player
—	DF	ARG	Agustin Gómez (at AIK until 31 December 2017)
—	GK	ARG	Fernando Pellegrino (at Sarmiento until 30 June 2018)
—	FW	ARG	Pablo Bueno (at Flandria until 30 June 2018)

== Transfers ==
=== In ===
Date	Pos.	Name	From	Fee
4 July 2017	DF	(Argentina) Lucas Suárez	(Argentina) Sarmiento	Undisclosed
5 July 2017	MF	(Argentina) Daniel González	(Argentina) Temperley	Undisclosed
17 August 2017	DF	(Switzerland) Dylan Gissi	(Argentina) Rosario Central	Undisclosed
17 August 2017	FW	(Argentina) Gonzalo Díaz	(Argentina) Vélez Sarsfield	Undisclosed

=== Out ===
Date	Pos.	Name	To	Fee
1 July 2017	FW	(Argentina) Nicolás Stefanelli	(Sweden) AIK	Undisclosed
6 July 2017	MF	(Argentina) Jonás Gutiérrez	(Argentina) Independiente	Undisclosed
10 July 2017	FW	(Argentina) Andrés Ríos	(Brazil) Vasco da Gama	Undisclosed

=== Loan in ===
Date from	Date to	Pos.	Name	From
1 July 2017	30 June 2018	MF	(Argentina) Nahuel Cisneros	(Argentina) Boca Juniors
7 July 2017	30 June 2018	MF	(Argentina) Franco Cristaldo	(Argentina) Boca Juniors
8 July 2017	30 June 2018	MF	(Argentina) Adrián Cubas	(Argentina) Boca Juniors
30 July 2017	30 June 2018	FW	(Argentina) Fernando Márquez	(Argentina) Belgrano
31 July 2017	30 June 2018	FW	(Argentina) Facundo Melivilo	(Argentina) Chacarita Juniors
31 July 2017	30 June 2018	FW	(Argentina) Horacio Tijanovich	(Argentina) Gimnasia y Esgrima
10 August 2017	30 June 2018	DF	(Argentina) Lisandro Martínez	(Argentina) Newell's Old Boys
14 August 2017	30 June 2018	MF	(Argentina) Jonathan Requena	(Argentina) Banfield
22 August 2017	30 June 2018	DF	(Uruguay) Leandro Zazpe	(Uruguay) Juventud
24 August 2017	30 June 2018	FW	(Argentina) Fabián Bordagaray	(Argentina) Rosario Central

=== Loan out ===
Date from	Date to	Pos.	Name	To
26 July 2017	31 December 2017	DF	(Argentina) Agustin Gómez	(Sweden) AIK
27 July 2017	30 June 2018	GK	(Argentina) Fernando Pellegrino	(Argentina) Sarmiento
31 July 2017	30 June 2018	FW	(Argentina) Pablo Bueno	(Argentina) Flandria

== Friendlies ==
=== Pre-season ===
Win Draw Loss

14 July 2017 Friendly	Argentina U20s	0–2	(Argentina) Defensa y Justicia	Ezeiza, Argentina
		Report	G. Castellani; C. Rius	Stadium: Complejo Habitacional Deportivo de Ezeiza

17 July 2017 Friendly	Defensa y Justicia (Argentina)	3–0	(Argentina) Villa San Carlos	Bosques, Argentina
09:30	M. Sosa; T. Pochettino; N. Di Giano	Report

20 July 2017 Friendly	Racing Club (Argentina)	0–1	(Argentina) Defensa y Justicia	Córdoba, Argentina
09:30		Report	I. Rivero	Stadium: Estadio Presidente Perón

20 July 2017 Friendly	Racing Club (Argentina)	0–1	(Argentina) Defensa y Justicia	Córdoba, Argentina
10:45		Report	N. Di Giano	Stadium: Estadio Presidente Perón

3 August 2017 Friendly	Defensa y Justicia (Argentina)	1–1	(Argentina) Gimnasia y Esgrima	Buenos Aires, Argentina
	J. Kaprof	Report	N. Ibáñez	Stadium: Estadio Norberto "Tito" Tomaghello

9 August 2017 Friendly	Atenas (Uruguay)	Cancelled	(Argentina) Defensa y Justicia	Maldonado, Uruguay
15:00		Report		Stadium: Campus Mun. de Maldonado

16 August 2017 Friendly	Tigre (Argentina)	1–0	(Argentina) Defensa y Justicia	Victoria, Argentina
	C. Luna 21'	Report		Stadium: Estadio José Dellagiovanna

16 August 2017 Friendly	Tigre (Argentina)	0–1	(Argentina) Defensa y Justicia	Victoria, Argentina
		Report	C. Rius	Stadium: Estadio José Dellagiovanna

=== Mid-season ===
29 August 2017 Friendly	Defensa y Justicia (Argentina)	Cancelled	(Argentina) UAI Urquiza
		Report

1 September 2017 Friendly	Defensa y Justicia (Argentina)	3–1	(Argentina) Villa San Carlos	Florencio Varela, Argentina
	I. Rivero; D. González; F. Melivillo	Report	Goal

1 September 2017 Friendly	Defensa y Justicia (Argentina)	4–1	(Argentina) Villa San Carlos	Florencio Varela, Argentina
	F. Bordagaray; H. Tijanovich	Report	Goal

== Primera División ==
=== League table ===
Pos	Team	Pld	W	D	L	GF	GA	GD	Pts	Qualification
7	Racing	27	13	6	8	46	32	+14	45	Qualification for Copa Sudamericana first stage
8	River Plate	27	13	6	8	39	26	+13	45	Qualification for Copa Libertadores group stage (Note: River Plate qualified for the Copa Libertadores group stage by winning the 2018 Copa Libertadores.)
9	Defensa y Justicia	27	13	5	9	41	34	+7	44	Qualification for Copa Sudamericana first stage
10	Unión	27	11	10	6	33	23	+10	43	Qualification for Copa Sudamericana first stage
11	Colón	27	11	8	8	32	22	+10	41	Qualification for Copa Sudamericana first stage

Source: AFA
Rules for classification: 1) points; 2) play-off (only if needed to decide championship); 3) goal difference; 4) goals scored; 5) head-to-head points; 6) head-to-head goal difference; 7) head-to-head goals scored.

=== Results by matchday ===
Matchday	1	2	3	4	5	6	7	8	9	10	11	12	13	14	15	16	17	18	19	20	21	22	23	24	25	26	27
Ground	H	A	H	A	H	A	H	A	H	A	H	A	H														
Result	D	W	L	L	D	L	D	W	W	W	W	L															
Position	10	6	16	21	20	21	22	21	14	11	8	10															

Updated to match(es) played on 12 December 2017. Source: Soccerway
A = Away; H = Home; W = Win; D = Draw; L = Loss

26 August 2017 1	Defensa y Justicia (Argentina)	4–4	(Argentina) Gimnasia y Esgrima	Buenos Aires, Argentina
14:05	C. Rius 11'; F. Márquez 23', 52'; G. Castellani 35'	Report	N. Ibáñez 14', 18'; L. Faravelli 41'; F. Niell 84'	Stadium: Estadio Norberto "Tito" Tomaghello; Referee: Facundo Tello (Argentina)

9 September 2017 2	Estudiantes (Argentina)	0–1	(Argentina) Defensa y Justicia	La Plata, Argentina
16:05		Report	F. Márquez 83'	Stadium: Estadio Ciudad de La Plata; Referee: Fernando Espinoza (Argentina)

16 September 2017 3	Defensa y Justicia (Argentina)	1–3	(Argentina) Unión Santa Fe	Buenos Aires, Argentina
14:05	C. Rius 28'	Report	F. Soldano 18', 58'; L. Gamba 23'	Stadium: Estadio Norberto "Tito" Tomaghello; Referee: Andrés Merlos (Argentina)

24 September 2017 4	Colón (Argentina)	3–1	(Argentina) Defensa y Justicia	Santa Fe, Argentina
11:05	G. Conti 9'; C. Bernardi 64'; C. Guanca 90+4'	Report	G. Castellani 81'	Stadium: Estadio Brigadier General Estanislao López; Referee: Juan Pompei (Argentina)

29 September 2017 5	Defensa y Justicia (Argentina)	0–0	(Argentina) Huracán	Buenos Aires, Argentina
19:05		Report		Stadium: Estadio Norberto "Tito" Tomaghello; Referee: Hernán Mastrángelo (Argentina)

13 October 2017 6	San Lorenzo (Argentina)	3–1	(Argentina) Defensa y Justicia	Buenos Aires, Argentina
21:05	E. Cerutti 18', 66'; N. Blandi 47'	Report	N. Fernández 90'	Stadium: Estadio Pedro Bidegain; Referee: Nicolás Lamolina (Argentina)

30 October 2017 7	Defensa y Justicia (Argentina)	1–1	(Argentina) Olimpo	Buenos Aires, Argentina
19:05	F. Márquez 23'	Report	D. Depetris 86'	Stadium: Estadio Norberto "Tito" Tomaghello; Referee: Fernando Rapallini (Argentina)

5 November 2017 8	Temperley (Argentina)	1–4	(Argentina) Defensa y Justicia	Turdera, Argentina
11:05	A. Arregui 79' (pen.)	Report	F. Márquez 17'; N. Fernández 22', 26'; L. Martínez 52'	Stadium: Estadio Alfredo Beranger; Referee: Darío Herrera (Argentina)

18 November 2017 9	Defensa y Justicia (Argentina)	3–0	(Argentina) Lanús	Buenos Aires, Argentina
17:00	N. Fernández 46', 49'; J. Kaprof 60' (pen.)	Report		Stadium: Estadio Norberto "Tito" Tomaghello; Referee: Juan Pompei (Argentina)

24 November 2017 10	Banfield (Argentina)	0–1	(Argentina) Defensa y Justicia	Banfield, Argentina
17:00		Report	J. Kaprof 11'	Stadium: Estadio Florencio Sola; Referee: Fernando Espinoza (Argentina)

1 December 2017 11	Defensa y Justicia (Argentina)	3–2	(Argentina) Godoy Cruz	Buenos Aires, Argentina
19:15	N. Fernández 7', 59'; L. Abecasis 82' (o.g.)	Report	Á. Gonzalez 71'; J. Correa 73'	Stadium: Estadio Norberto "Tito" Tomaghello; Referee: Hernán Mastrángelo (Argentina)

11 December 2017 12	San Martín (Argentina)	1–0	(Argentina) Defensa y Justicia	San Juan, Argentina
19:15	F. Barcelo 38'	Report		Stadium: Estadio Ingeniero Hilario Sánchez; Referee: Facundo Tello (Argentina)

January 2018 13	Defensa y Justicia (Argentina)	–	(Argentina) Vélez Sarsfield	Buenos Aires, Argentina
				Stadium: Estadio Norberto "Tito" Tomaghello

== Copa Argentina ==
Win Draw Loss

21 August 2017 R32	Temperley (Argentina)	0–2	(Argentina) Defensa y Justicia	Avellaneda, Argentina
18:00		Report	C. Rius 34'; M. Sosa 80'	Stadium: Estadio Presidente Juan Domingo Perón; Referee: Juan Pompei (Argentina)

7 October 2017 R16	River Plate (Argentina)	3–0	(Argentina) Defensa y Justicia	Formosa, Argentina
19:00	I. Scocco 11' (pen.), 87'; E. Palacios 87'	Report		Stadium: Estadio Antonio Romero; Referee: Silvio Trucco (Argentina)

== Copa Sudamericana ==
Win Draw Loss

=== Second stage ===
25 July 2017 Second leg	Chapecoense (Brazil)	1–0 (agg: 1–1) (4–2 p)	(Argentina) Defensa y Justicia	Chapecó, Brazil
19:15	Túlio de Melo 24'	Report		Stadium: Arena Condá; Referee: Daniel Fedorczuk (Uruguay)
	Penalties
	L. Antônio (penalty scored); W. Paulista (penalty scored); F. Bruno (penalty scored); Lourency (penalty scored)		L. Jerez Silva (penalty scored); H. Fredes (penalty scored); M. Bareiro (penalty missed); D. González (penalty missed)
