= Ignacio Lago =

Argentine professional footballer

Personal information
- Full name: Manuel Ignacio Lago
- Date of birth: 5 August 2002 (age 24)
- Place of birth: Isidro Casanova, Argentina
- Height: 1.72 m (5 ft 8 in)
- Positions: Left winger; forward

Team information
- Current team: Colón

Youth career
- Almirante Brown

Senior career*
Years	Team	Apps	(Gls)
2018–2020	Almirante Brown	31	(3)
2020–2025	Talleres	9	(0)
2021	→ Tlaxcala (loan)	16	(5)
2022	→ San Martín SJ (loan)	16	(4)
2023	→ Atlético de Rafaela (loan)	33	(5)
2024	→ Colón (loan)	26	(6)
2025–	Colón	27	(2)
- * Club domestic league appearances and goals as of 18:52, 20 March 2026 (UTC)

Manuel Ignacio Lago (born 5 August 2002) is an Argentine professional footballer who plays as a left winger or forward for Colón.

== Career ==
Lago is a product of Almirante Brown's youth system. He made the move into senior football at the age of fifteen, featuring off the substitutes four times in the 2017–18 season. His debut arrived on 10 February 2018 versus Atlanta, as he was substituted in on eighty-four minutes to become Almirante Brown's youngest ever debutant in competitive football; aged fifteen years, six months and five days to surpass Jonathan Casasola's record as a sixteen-year-old from 2009. In his sixth appearance, on 17 March 2019, Lago scored his first senior goal in a victory over Colegiales. Overall, he scored three goals in thirty-one games for them.

On 11 September 2020, Lago completed a transfer to Primera División side Talleres.

== Personal life ==
In April 2026, Ignacio Lago publicly came out as gay during a television appearance, becoming the first active professional footballer in Argentina to do so.

== Career statistics ==
As of 14 September 2020.

Appearances and goals by club, season and competition
Club	Season	League			Cup		League Cup		Continental		Other		Total	
Club	Season	Division	Apps	Goals	Apps	Goals	Apps	Goals	Apps	Goals	Apps	Goals	Apps	Goals
Almirante Brown	2017–18	Primera B Metropolitana	4	0	0	0	—		—		0	0	4	0
Almirante Brown	2018–19	Primera B Metropolitana	7	1	0	0	—		—		0	0	7	1
Almirante Brown	2019–20	Primera B Metropolitana	20	2	0	0	—		—		0	0	20	2
Almirante Brown	Total		31	3	0	0	—		—		0	0	31	3
Talleres	2020–21	Primera División	0	0	0	0	0	0	—		0	0	0	0
Career total			31	3	0	0	0	0	—		0	0	31	3
