= Leonel González =

Argentine footballer (born 1994)

Personal information
- Full name: Leonel Hernán González
- Date of birth: 15 March 1994 (age 32)
- Place of birth: Concordia, Argentina
- Height: 1.77 m (5 ft 10 in)
- Position: Left-back

Team information
- Current team: Melgar

Youth career
- Newell's Old Boys

Senior career*
Years	Team	Apps	(Gls)
2013–2015	Newell's Old Boys	0	(0)
2016–2021	Estudiantes BA	89	(2)
2020–2021	→ Godoy Cruz (loan)	37	(1)
2022–2024	Godoy Cruz	11	(0)
2022–2023	→ Argentinos Juniors (loan)	19	(0)
2024–	→ Melgar (loan)	30	(0)
2025–	Melgar	30	(2)
2026	→ Universidad de Concepción (loan)	16	(1)
- * Club domestic league appearances and goals as of 23 June 2026

Leonel Hernán González (born 15 March 1994) is an Argentine professional footballer who plays as a left-back for Peruvian club Melgar.

== Career ==
González progressed through the Newell's Old Boys ranks. He never made a competitive appearance for them, but was an unused substitute for Primera División fixtures with Vélez Sarsfield and Arsenal de Sarandí in 2013. January 2016 saw González join Primera B Metropolitana team Estudiantes. He made his senior debut on 10 April in a 3–0 loss away to Deportivo Español. Five more appearances arrived in the 2016 campaign, which preceded a further sixty-seven across the next three seasons - which culminated with promotion in 2018–19, as González also scored for the first time versus Sacachispas on 18 May 2019.

After one goal in sixteen encounters in the 2019–20 Primera B Nacional for Estudiantes, González departed on loan in August 2020 to Primera División side Godoy Cruz until the end of 2022, with a purchase option. Diego Martínez selected him for his top-flight debut on 2 November, as he featured for the full duration of a loss away against Rosario Central. At the end of November 2021, Godoy Cruz triggered the purchase option and signed González on a deal until the end of 2024.

On 11 July 2022, Argentinos Juniors officially presented Leonel González as their new reinforcement, with the player signing a loan deal until the end of 2023 with a purchase option.

On 3 January 2026, González joined Chilean club Universidad de Concepción on loan from Melgar. He moved back to Peruvian club in June of the same year.

== Career statistics ==
As of 3 November 2024.

Club	Division	Season	League		Cup		Continental		Total	
Club	Division	Season	Apps	Goals	Apps	Goals	Apps	Goals	Apps	Goals
Estudiantes BA	Primera B Metropolitana	2016	6	0	0	0	—		6	0
Estudiantes BA	Primera B Metropolitana	2016-17	23	0	0	0	—		24	0
Estudiantes BA	Primera B Metropolitana	2017-18	13	0	0	0	—		13	0
Estudiantes BA	Primera B Metropolitana	2018-19	31	1	0	1	—		35	1
Estudiantes BA	Primera B Nacional	2019-20	16	1	—		—		16	1
Estudiantes BA	Total		89	2	5	0	0	0	94	2
Godoy Cruz	Primera División	2020	—		15	1	—		15	1
Godoy Cruz	Primera División	2021	18	0	9	0	—		27	0
Godoy Cruz	Primera División	2022	—		11	0	—		11	0
Godoy Cruz	Total		18	0	35	1	0	0	53	1
Argentinos Juniors	Primera División	2022	11	0	—		—		11	0
Argentinos Juniors	Primera División	2023	7	0	1	0	3	0	11	0
Argentinos Juniors	Total		18	0	1	0	3	0	22	0
Melgar	Liga 1	2024	30	0	—		2	0	32	0
Career total			155	2	41	1	5	0	201	3
