= Gonzalo Ríos =

Argentine footballer (born 1992)

Personal information
- Full name: Gonzalo Matías Ríos
- Date of birth: January 30, 1992 (age 34)
- Place of birth: San Rafael, Argentina
- Height: 1.82 m (6 ft 0 in)
- Position: Forward

Team information
- Current team: Central Norte

Youth career
- Rosario Central

Senior career*
| Years | Team | Apps | (Gls) |
| 2010–2021 | Boca Unidos | 171 | (30) |
| 2014 | → Quilmes (loan) | 12 | (4) |
| 2015 | → León (loan) | 14 | (3) |
| 2016 | → Temperley (loan) | 15 | (3) |
| 2019–2020 | → Central Norte (loan) | 17 | (6) |
| 2022– | Central Norte | 0 | (0) |
- * Club domestic league appearances and goals as of 14:35, 27 March 2022 (UTC)

Gonzalo Matias Rios (born 30 January 1992 in San Rafael) is an Argentine football striker who plays for Central Norte.

== León ==
Club León announced on 2 February 2015 that Ríos would be joining the team in a season-long loan from Boca Unidos. On 21 February 2015, Ríos made his debut with Club León in the Liga MX against CF Pachuca coming in as a substitute at minute 56' for Miguel Sabah. On 29 November 2015, a day after being eliminated in the semi-finals of the Liga MX Apertura 2015 by Club América, current manager Juan Antonio Pizzi announced that Ríos' loan had expired and he would be returning to Boca Unidos.
