= Joaquín Ochoa =

Argentine professional footballer

Personal information
- Full name: Joaquín Ochoa Giménez
- Date of birth: 1 September 1996 (age 30)
- Place of birth: Buenos Aires, Argentina
- Height: 1.83 m (6 ft 0 in)
- Position: Midfielder

Team information
- Current team: Arsenal Sarandí

Youth career
- Atlanta

Senior career*
| Years | Team | Apps | (Gls) |
| 2017–2024 | Atlanta | 95 | (5) |
| 2022 | → Racing Montevideo (loan) | 27 | (4) |
| 2023 | → Fénix (loan) | 7 | (0) |
| 2024–2025 | Alvarado | 6 | (0) |
| 2025 | San Telmo | 2 | (1) |
| 2025–2026 | Real Pilar | 11 | (1) |
| 2026– | Arsenal Sarandí | 6 | (1) |
- * Club domestic league appearances and goals as of 18:47, 25 March 2026 (UTC)

Joaquín Ochoa Giménez (born 1 September 1996) is an Argentine professional footballer who plays as a midfielder for Arsenal Sarandí.

== Career ==
Ochoa Giménez's career began with Atlanta. He made his debut in professional football under manager Fernando Ruiz on 11 March 2017, coming off the bench in place of Nahuel Peralta during a draw at home to Colegiales. Seven more appearances followed in Primera B Metropolitana in 2016–17. Ochoa Giménez scored his first goal during a win away to Deportivo Español in September 2017, with a goal versus Barracas Central following in March 2018; an opponent he netted against again a year later.

== Career statistics ==
As of 29 April 2019.

Appearances and goals by club, season and competition
| Club | Season | League | | | Cup | | League Cup | | Continental | | Other | | Total | |
| Club | Season | Division | Apps | Goals | Apps | Goals | Apps | Goals | Apps | Goals | Apps | Goals | Apps | Goals |
|---|---|---|---|---|---|---|---|---|---|---|---|---|---|---|
| Atlanta | 2016–17 | Primera B Metropolitana | 8 | 0 | 0 | 0 | — | | — | | 0 | 0 | 8 | 0 |
| Atlanta | 2017–18 | Primera B Metropolitana | 28 | 2 | 2 | 0 | — | | — | | 0 | 0 | 30 | 2 |
| Atlanta | 2018–19 | Primera B Metropolitana | 9 | 2 | 0 | 0 | — | | — | | 0 | 0 | 9 | 2 |
| Career total | | | 45 | 4 | 2 | 0 | — | | — | | 0 | 0 | 47 | 4 |
