= Santiago López (footballer, born 1989) =

Argentine footballer

Personal information
- Full name: Santiago Ignacio López
- Date of birth: 19 April 1989 (age 37)
- Place of birth: Berazategui, Argentina
- Height: 1.83 m (6 ft 0 in)
- Position: Left-back

Team information
- Current team: Berazategui

Youth career
- 9 de Julio

Senior career*
Years	Team	Apps	(Gls)
2007–2009	9 de Julio	22	(0)
2010–2011	Tristán Suárez	27	(0)
2011–2012	JJ Urquiza	16	(0)
2012–2015	Deportivo Español	127	(3)
2013	→ Altos Hornos Zapla (loan)	11	(0)
2016–2017	Estudiantes BA	43	(0)
2017–2018	Deportivo Riestra	6	(0)
2018–2019	Argentino de Quilmes	38	(2)
2019–2021	Deportivo Laferrere	56	(1)
2022–	Berazategui	11	(0)
- * Club domestic league appearances and goals as of 19:05, 8 August 2022 (UTC)

Santiago Ignacio López (born 19 April 1989) is an Argentine professional footballer who plays as a left-back for Berazategui.

== Career ==
López's first club was 9 de Julio in 2007, who he played twenty-two times for in two seasons in Torneo Argentino B. Tristán Suárez signed López in 2010, he stayed with the club for one season, 2010–11 Primera B Metropolitana, and featured in twenty-seven fixtures. López had a spell with Justo José de Urquiza between 2011 and 2012, prior to signing for Deportivo Español ahead of the 2012–13 Primera C Metropolitana campaign. In his second season, 2013–14, Deportivo Español were promoted to Primera B Metropolitana. He scored his first professional goal in their 2014 opener versus Chacarita Juniors.

He departed Deportivo Español in December 2015, following three goals in one hundred and twenty-seven appearances in three years. During his time with the club, López was loaned out to Altos Hornos Zapla of Torneo Argentino B in 2013. January 2016 saw López join Primera B Metropolitana's Estudiantes. Forty-two appearances followed in the 2016 and 2016–17 seasons. On 22 August 2017, López completed a move to Primera B Nacional side Deportivo Riestra. However, he didn't play any games for the Blanquinegros during the season. Argentino de Quilmes signed López in 2018. In the summer 2019, López joined Deportivo Laferrere.

== Career statistics ==
As of 5 September 2018.

Club statistics
Club	Season	League			Cup (Note: Includes the Copa Argentina)		League Cup		Continental		Other		Total	
Club	Season	Division	Apps	Goals	Apps	Goals	Apps	Goals	Apps	Goals	Apps	Goals	Apps	Goals
Tristán Suárez	2010–11	Primera B Metropolitana	27	0	0	0	—		—		0	0	27	0
Justo José de Urquiza	2011–12	Primera C Metropolitana	16	0	0	0	—		—		0	0	16	0
Estudiantes	2016	Primera B Metropolitana	10	0	0	0	—		—		0	0	10	0
Estudiantes	2016–17	Primera B Metropolitana	29	0	1	0	—		—		3 (Note: Three appearances in 2016–17 Primera B Metropolitana play-offs)	0	33	0
Estudiantes	Total		39	0	1	0	—		—		3	0	43	0
Deportivo Riestra	2017–18	Primera B Nacional	0	0	0	0	—		—		0	0	0	0
Argentino de Quilmes	2018–19	Primera C Metropolitana	2	2	0	0	—		—		0	0	2	2
Career total			84	2	1	0	—		—		3	0	88	2
