= Nahuel Rodríguez (footballer, born 1987) =

Argentine footballer

Personal information
- Full name: Nahuel César Rodríguez
- Date of birth: 3 April 1987 (age 39)
- Place of birth: Pérez, Argentina
- Position: Defender

Team information
- Current team: Sportivo Belgrano

Youth career
- Mitre (P)
- 2004–2008: Rosario Central

Senior career*
| Years | Team | Apps | (Gls) |
| 2008–2011 | Mitre (P) | | |
| 2011–2013 | Central Córdoba | 64 | (4) |
| 2013–2014 | Tiro Federal | 24 | (0) |
| 2014–2015 | Mitre (SdE) | 22 | (1) |
| 2016– | Sportivo Belgrano | 48 | (6) |
- * Club domestic league appearances and goals as of 19:08, 9 October 2018 (UTC)

Nahuel César Rodríguez (born 3 April 1987) is an Argentine footballer who plays as a defender for Sportivo Belgrano.

== Career ==
Rodríguez's youth career got underway with local club Mitre (P), before joining Rosario Central. He departed in 2008, which led to Rodríguez rejoining Mitre (P). In 2011, following a successful trial, Rodríguez signed for Central Córdoba. The club won promotion in his first season of 2011–12, during which he scored two goals in thirty-one fixtures. Rodríguez scored another two in his first four appearances in professional football, netting in Primera B Metropolitana games against Chacarita Juniors and Flandria in August 2012. On 30 July 2013, Torneo Argentino A's Tiro Federal signed Rodríguez. He was selected twenty-nine times in 2013–14.

July 2014 saw Rodríguez joined Torneo Federal A side Mitre. One goal in twenty-four games followed over two seasons. On 6 January 2016, ahead of the 2016 Torneo Federal A campaign, Rodríguez made a move to join Sportivo Belgrano. He scored seven times in his first three seasons across fifty-five matches, with his first coming during a victory over Deportivo Madryn in May 2016.

== Career statistics ==
As of 9 October 2018.

Club statistics
| Club | Season | League | | | Cup (Note: Includes the Copa Argentina) | | League Cup | | Continental | | Other | | Total | |
| Club | Season | Division | Apps | Goals | Apps | Goals | Apps | Goals | Apps | Goals | Apps | Goals | Apps | Goals |
|---|---|---|---|---|---|---|---|---|---|---|---|---|---|---|
| Central Córdoba | 2011–12 | Primera C Metropolitana | 31 | 2 | 2 | 0 | — | | — | | 0 | 0 | 33 | 2 |
| Central Córdoba | 2012–13 | Primera B Metropolitana | 33 | 2 | 1 | 0 | — | | — | | 0 | 0 | 34 | 2 |
| Central Córdoba | Total | | 64 | 4 | 3 | 0 | — | | — | | 0 | 0 | 67 | 4 |
| Tiro Federal | 2013–14 | Torneo Argentino A | 24 | 0 | 0 | 0 | — | | — | | 5 (Note: Five appearances in the 2013–14 Torneo Argentino A play-offs) | 0 | 29 | 0 |
| Mitre | 2014 | Torneo Federal A | 5 | 0 | 0 | 0 | — | | — | | 1 (Note: One appearance in the 2014 Torneo Federal A play-offs) | 0 | 6 | 0 |
| Mitre | 2015 | Torneo Federal A | 17 | 1 | 0 | 0 | — | | — | | 1 (Note: One appearance in the 2015 Torneo Federal A play-offs) | 0 | 18 | 1 |
| Mitre | Total | | 22 | 1 | 0 | 0 | — | | — | | 2 | 0 | 24 | 1 |
| Sportivo Belgrano | 2016 | Torneo Federal A | 4 | 0 | 0 | 0 | — | | — | | 4 (Note: Four appearances in the 2016 Torneo Federal A play-offs) | 1 (Note: One goal in the 2016 Torneo Federal A play-offs) | 8 | 1 |
| Sportivo Belgrano | 2016–17 | Torneo Federal A | 17 | 1 | 0 | 0 | — | | — | | 4 (Note: Four appearances in the 2016–17 Torneo Federal A play-offs) | 1 (Note: One goal in the 2016–17 Torneo Federal A play-offs) | 21 | 2 |
| Sportivo Belgrano | 2017–18 | Torneo Federal A | 21 | 4 | 3 | 0 | — | | — | | 2 (Note: Two appearances in the 2017–18 Torneo Federal A play-offs) | 0 | 26 | 4 |
| Sportivo Belgrano | 2018–19 | Torneo Federal A | 6 | 1 | 1 | 0 | — | | — | | 0 | 0 | 7 | 1 |
| Sportivo Belgrano | Total | | 48 | 6 | 4 | 0 | — | | — | | 10 | 2 | 62 | 8 |
| Career total | | | 158 | 11 | 7 | 0 | — | | — | | 17 | 2 | 182 | 13 |
