= Facundo Quiroga (footballer, born 1985) =

Argentine footballer

Personal information
- Full name: Facundo Nicolás Quiroga
- Date of birth: May 16, 1985 (age 41)
- Place of birth: Garin, Buenos Aires, Argentina
- Height: 1.75 m (5 ft 9 in)
- Position: Defender

Youth career
- Argentinos Juniors

Senior career*
Years	Team	Apps	(Gls)
2005–2009	Argentinos Juniors	22	(0)
2009	Atlético Tucumán	2	(0)
2009–2010	Fénix	6	(0)
2010–2011	Monagas SC	12	(0)
2011	Sarmiento de Leones	15	(0)
2012–2015	Estudiantes San Luis	98	(3)
2016–2017	Club Atlético Paraná	29	(0)
2017–2020	Estudiantes San Luis	67	(3)
2021	Club Cipolletti	2	(0)
2021-2022	Club Ciudad de Bolívar	2	(0)
2022	Deportivo Armenio	14	(1)
2022–2024	Club Ciudad de Bolívar	51	(2)
2024	Estudiantes San Luis	23	(1)
- * Club domestic league appearances and goals as of 8 January 2026

Facundo Nicolás Quiroga (born 16 May 1985) is an Argentine football player. He is currently without a team.
