= Maximiliano Rodríguez (footballer, born 1988) =

Argentine professional footballer

Personal information
- Date of birth: 14 February 1988 (age 38)
- Place of birth: Córdoba, Argentina
- Height: 1.70 m (5 ft 7 in)
- Position: Midfielder

Team information
- Current team: Talleres RdE

Youth career
- General Paz Juniors

Senior career*
Years	Team	Apps	(Gls)
2006–2007	General Paz Juniors		
2007	Bella Vista	1	(0)
2008–2009	General Paz Juniors		
2009–2010	Independiente	5	(0)
2010–2016	Talleres	141	(12)
2015–2016	→ Barracas Central (loan)	35	(1)
2016–2023	Barracas Central	145	(5)
2020–2021	→ Deportivo Riestra (loan)	41	(3)
2024	Deportivo Riestra	19	(0)
2025–	Talleres RdE	19	(0)
- * Club domestic league appearances and goals as of 17:56, 21 August 2025 (UTC)

Maximiliano Rodríguez (born 14 February 1988) is an Argentine professional footballer who plays as a midfielder for Talleres RdE.

== Career ==
Rodríguez began playing for General Paz Juniors in 2006, appearing once in the 2005–06 Torneo Argentino A as they were relegated. 2007 saw Rodríguez join Bella Vista, where he played in one fixture before sealing a return to General Paz Juniors of Torneo Argentino B in 2008. A year later, Rodríguez moved across the fourth tier to Independiente. Five appearances followed. Primera C Metropolitana side Talleres signed Rodríguez in 2010. He participated in one hundred and forty-one games and scored twelve goals. In January 2015, Rodríguez was loaned to Barracas Central. He was signed permanently in 2016.

Rodríguez's first appearance as a permanent Barracas Central player came on 4 September versus San Telmo, with his first goal coming in the succeeding May against former club Talleres. He scored three goals in thirty-eight matches in 2016–17 and 2017–18.

== Career statistics ==
As of 2 May 2019.

Appearances and goals by club, season and competition
Club	Season	League			Cup		League Cup		Continental		Other		Total	
Club	Season	Division	Apps	Goals	Apps	Goals	Apps	Goals	Apps	Goals	Apps	Goals	Apps	Goals
Independiente	2009–10	Torneo Argentino B	5	0	0	0	—		—		0	0	5	0
Talleres	2015	Primera C Metropolitana	0	0	0	0	—		—		0	0	0	0
Talleres	2016	Primera B Metropolitana	0	0	0	0	—		—		0	0	0	0
Talleres	Total		0	0	0	0	—		—		0	0	0	0
Barracas Central (loan)	2015	Primera B Metropolitana	25	1	1	0	—		—		1 (Note: Appearance(s) in the Primera B Metropolitana play-offs)	0	27	1
Barracas Central (loan)	2016	Primera B Metropolitana	9	0	0	0	—		—		0	0	9	0
Barracas Central	2016–17	Primera B Metropolitana	16	1	0	0	—		—		0	0	16	1
Barracas Central	2017–18	Primera B Metropolitana	21	2	0	0	—		—		1	0	22	2
Barracas Central	2018–19	Primera B Metropolitana	33	1	1	0	—		—		0	0	34	1
Barracas Central	Total		104	5	2	0	—		—		2	0	108	5
Career total			107	5	2	0	—		—		2	0	111	5

== Honours ==
Barracas Central

- Primera B Metropolitana: 2018–19
