= Club Atlético Güemes =

Güemes
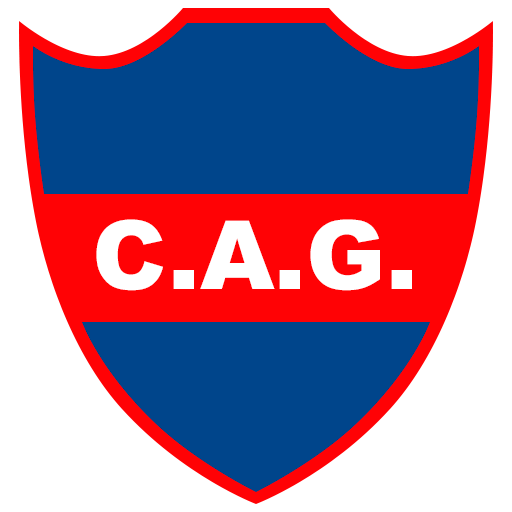
- Full name: Club Atlético Güemes
- Nicknames: Gauchos; Azulgranas
- Founded: 12 October 1932; 94 years ago
- Ground: Estadio Arturo Miranda; Santiago del Estero, Argentina
- Capacity: 18,000
- President: Eduardo Makhoul
- Coach: Pablo Guiñazú
- League: Primera Nacional
- 2025: Primera Nacional Zone A, 13th of 18
Home colours	Away colours	Third colours

Club Atlético Güemes, known as Atlético Güemes or simply Güemes, is an Argentine sports club based in Santiago del Estero, founded on 12 October 1932.

The club is mostly known for its football team, which currently plays in Primera Nacional, the second division of the Argentine league system. Other sports practised at the club are basketball, roller skating, five-a-side football, judo and cestoball.

== History ==
Founded on 12 October 1932 as an honour to military leader Martín Miguel de Güemes, the club mainly played in regional competitions. In 1986, after winning the previous year's Torneo Regional, they featured in the 1986 Liguilla Pre-Libertadores, being knocked out by Ferro Carril Oeste in the qualifying rounds.

Güemes narrowly missed out on promotion to Primera B Nacional in 1988; after leading their zone in the Torneo del Interior, the club reached the finals but lost to San Martín de Tucumán. The club finally reached promotion to the Torneo Federal B in 2014, after winning eight out of ten matches in the regional leagues.

On 28 December 2015, Güemes defeated San Martín de Formosa and reached the Torneo Federal A for the first time in their history. Despite suffering immediate relegation, the club returned to the division for the 2019–20 campaign, where they led their group before the season was curtailed due to the COVID-19 pandemic.

Güemes won the 2020 Torneo Federal A after the season was reestablished, achieving promotion to the Primera Nacional on 18 January 2021.

== Players ==
=== Current squad ===
As of 7 March 2026 Note: Flags indicate national team as defined under FIFA eligibility rules; some limited exceptions apply. Players may hold more than one non-FIFA nationality.

No.	Pos.	Nation	Player
—	GK	ARG	Laureano Martínez (on loan from Talleres de Córdoba)
—	GK	ARG	Leandro Finochietto (on loan from Argentinos Juniors)
—	GK	ARG	Tomás Palleres
—	DF	ARG	Walter Juárez
—	DF	COL	Óscar Vanegas
—	DF	ARG	Facundo Melillán
—	DF	ARG	Emilio Lazza
—	DF	ARG	Tomás Oneto
—	DF	ARG	Facundo Rizzi
—	DF	ARG	Marcelo Benítez (captain)
—	DF	ARG	Axel Bordón
—	DF	ARG	Rodrigo Arnay
—	MF	ARG	Franco Bergés

No.	Pos.	Nation	Player
—	MF	ARG	Nicolás Juárez
—	MF	ARG	Fernando Godoy
—	MF	ARG	Gianfranco Baier
—	MF	ARG	Milton Gerez
—	MF	ARG	Maico Quiroz (on loan from Racing Club)
—	MF	ARG	Santiago Farrera
—	FW	ARG	David Véliz
—	FW	ARG	Gianluca Pugliese
—	FW	ARG	Thomas Amilivia
—	FW	ARG	Juan Sánchez Sotelo
—	FW	ARG	Santiago Sala (on loan from Deportivo Morón)
—	FW	ARG	Juan Mendoza
—	FW	ARG	Gastón Esposito

=== Out on loan ===
Note: Flags indicate national team as defined under FIFA eligibility rules; some limited exceptions apply. Players may hold more than one non-FIFA nationality.

No.	Pos.	Nation	Player
—	MF	ARG	Miguel Ceccotti (at Argentino de Quilmes until 31 December 2026)
