= 2019–20 Godoy Cruz Antonio Tomba season =

Godoy Cruz
2019–20 season
- President: José Mansur
- Manager: Lucas Bernardi (until 20 August 2019); Javier Patalano (from 21 August 2019)
- Stadium: Estadio Malvinas Argentinas
- Top goalscorer: League: Santiago García (2); All: Santiago García (3)

The 2019–20 season is Godoy Cruz's 13th consecutive season in the top division of Argentine football. In addition to the Primera División, the club are competing in the Copa Argentina, Copa de la Superliga and Copa Libertadores.

The season generally covers the period from 1 July 2019 to 30 June 2020.

== Review ==
=== Pre-season ===
Godoy Cruz had signed five players by 15 June 2019. Gabriel Alanís was the first name through the door, with the left midfielder joining on 27 May from relegated Belgrano; who they'd also sign Juan Brunetta from on 15 June. Four days prior, on 11 June, the club announced a trio of signings in Sebastián Lomonaco (Arsenal de Sarandí), Joaquín Mateo (Gimnasia y Tiro) and Leandro Vella (Instituto). On 15 June, Brian Alferez agreed a loan move away to Mendoza's Gimnasia y Esgrima (M). Godoy Cruz returned to action with a double-header against their reserves on 22 June, subsequently having a victory and a draw; with Brunetta scoring on debut in the former. Leandro Lencinas, a winger, and Agustín Verdugo, a central midfielder, departed to second tier club Mitre on 25 June.

Luciano Abecasis followed Lencinas and Verdugo out the exit on 26 June, penning terms with Lanús. The transfer of Ángel González to Estudiantes was agreed on 27 June, though would be subject to a medical and contract terms. Néstor Breitenbruch returned to his homeland after a season in Mexican football on 28 June, sealing a deal with Godoy Cruz to become their sixth newcomer. Their third friendly encounter, on 29 June, ended in a draw with Patronato. A second match with them was also played, with Agustín Manzur scoring to give Godoy Cruz a win. Numerous loans from the previous campaign officially expired on and around 30 June. 1 July saw Victorio Ramis leave on loan to Argentinos Juniors. Fernando Núñez headed off to second tier Sarmiento on 2 July.

Godoy Cruz suffered their first loss of pre-season on 3 July to Unión Santa Fe, though won the follow-up encounter thanks to goals from Miguel Merentiel and recent acquisition Joaquín Mateo. Ángel González's departure to Estudiantes was officialised on 6 July. Diego Sosa had a move to Argentinos Juniors confirmed on 6 July. Godoy Cruz lost twice to Newell's Old Boys in friendlies on 6 July. Facundo Cobos switched Argentina for Paraguay on 4 July, after agreeing a contract with Sol de América. Diego Viera officially did likewise on 8 July, after penning with Libertad during the preceding May. Godoy Cruz fought Mendoza-based Gimnasia y Esgrima in exhibition games on 11 July, avoiding defeat across two matches that saw Richard Prieto and Ezequiel Bullaude score.

=== July ===
Godoy Cruz progressed through the Copa Argentina round of thirty-two on 14 July, defeating Huracán in a penalty shoot-out that followed a 1–1 draw in normal time. Godoy hosted Palmeiras of Brazil's Série A in the Copa Libertadores round of sixteen on 23 July, as they surrendered a two-goal lead to end the first leg tied at 2–2. Days after, Dorados de Sinaloa announced the incoming of Danilo Ortiz from Godoy. On 27 July, the club lost to San Lorenzo in a five-goal thriller to open their Primera División campaign; debuting youngster Tomás Badaloni netted their first. Paraguayan centre-back Miguel Jacquet arrived at Godoy Cruz from Nacional on 29 July. Godoy fell to a 4–0 loss at Allianz Parque to Palmeiras on 30 July, as they exited the competition at the round of sixteen.

=== August ===
Arsenal de Sarandí condemned Godoy to their second league defeat in as many games on 5 August, as their opponents won by two goals at the Estadio Malvinas Argentinas. Godoy Cruz beat Deportivo Maipú in a friendly on 9 August, with the follow-up encounter ending goalless. Enzo Suraci went to Independiente Rivadavia on 13 August. 15 August saw Lucas Agüero depart on loan to All Boys. Atlético Tucumán defeated Godoy on 19 August in the Primera División, with a strike from Bruno Bianchi condemning them to their third straight league loss. Lucas Bernardi was subsequently sacked as manager, with Javier Patalano coming in as his replacement; Patalano had been reserve team manager. He won his first match in charge, as they beat Estudiantes on 25 August.

Godoy suffered their fifth overall defeat of 2019–20 on 31 August, as Racing Club secured a 3–1 win at the Estadio Presidente Juan Domingo Perón.

== Squad ==
Squad No.	Nationality	Name	Position(s)	Date of birth (age)	Signed from
Goalkeepers
1	Argentina	Roberto Ramírez	GK	7 July 1996 (age 30)	Academy
12	Argentina	Andrés Mehring	GK	19 April 1994 (age 32)	Argentino de Franck
25	Argentina	Juan Cruz Bolado	GK	22 July 1997 (age 29)	Academy
35	Argentina United States	Matías Soria	GK	23 November 2001 (age 24)	Academy
Defenders
2	Argentina	Joaquín Varela	CB	25 March 1997 (age 29)	Newell's Old Boys
3	Paraguay	Miguel Jacquet	CB	20 May 1995 (age 31)	Nacional
4	Argentina	Agustín Aleo	LB	20 May 1998 (age 28)	Academy
6	Argentina	Tomás Cardona	CB	10 October 1995 (age 31)	San Lorenzo
14	Argentina	Agustín Pereyra	DF	30 August 1998 (age 28)	Academy
15	Argentina	Marcos Rouzies	CB	22 May 1997 (age 29)	Academy
20	Argentina	Néstor Breitenbruch	CB	13 September 1995 (age 31)	Tigres UANL
22	Argentina	Nahuel Arena	CB	2 June 1998 (age 28)	Vélez Sarsfield
31	Argentina	Agustín Álvarez	DF	8 January 2000 (age 26)	Academy
32	Argentina	Facundo Rodríguez	CB	26 February 2000 (age 26)	Academy
Midfielders
7	Paraguay	Richard Prieto	LM	25 February 1997 (age 29)	General Díaz (loan)
8	Argentina	Facundo Barboza	CM	31 July 1996 (age 30)	Argentinos Juniors (loan)
11	Argentina	Leandro Vella	RW	9 September 1996 (age 30)	Instituto
16	Argentina	Agustín Manzur	CM	29 September 2000 (age 26)	Academy
19	Argentina	Fabián Henríquez	CM	8 June 1995 (age 31)	Academy
21	Argentina	Gabriel Alanís	LM	16 March 1994 (age 32)	Belgrano
24	Argentina	Facundo Gutiérrez	CM	3 June 1997 (age 29)	Racing Club (loan)
26	Argentina	Juan Brunetta	AM	12 May 1997 (age 29)	Belgrano
27	Argentina	Iván Smith	CM	24 March 1999 (age 27)	Quilmes
30	Argentina	Juan Andrada	DM	4 January 1995 (age 31)	Academy
34	Argentina	Daniel Molina	MF	10 September 1999 (age 27)	Academy
36	Argentina	Franco González	CM	7 March 1999 (age 27)	Academy
38	Argentina	Hernán Bernardello	CM	3 August 1986 (age 40)	Newell's Old Boys (loan)
39	Argentina	Valentín Burgoa	AM	16 August 2000 (age 26)	Academy
	Argentina	Julián García	MF	15 November 1999 (age 26)	Academy
	Argentina	Luciano Pizarro	DM	14 July 1997 (age 29)	Academy
Forwards
9	Uruguay	Miguel Merentiel	FW	24 February 1996 (age 30)	Peñarol
17	Argentina	Marcelo Freites	FW	12 July 1998 (age 28)	Academy
18	Uruguay	Santiago García	CF	14 September 1990 (age 36)	River Plate
29	Argentina	Tomás Badaloni	CF	2 May 2000 (age 26)	Academy
33	Argentina	Ezequiel Bullaude	RW	26 October 2000 (age 26)	Academy
	Argentina	Sebastián Lomonaco	FW	17 September 1998 (age 28)	Arsenal de Sarandí
	Argentina	Joaquín Mateo	FW	5 August 1997 (age 29)	Gimnasia y Tiro
Out on loan					Loaned to
	Argentina	Lucas Agüero	FW	28 April 1997 (age 29)	All Boys
	Argentina	Brian Alferez	CB	4 April 1998 (age 28)	Gimnasia y Esgrima (M)
	Argentina	Fabrizio Angileri	LB	15 March 1994 (age 32)	River Plate
	Paraguay	Gabriel Ávalos	CF	12 October 1990 (age 36)	Patronato
	Argentina	Sebastián Olivarez	RB	15 May 1992 (age 34)	Ferro Carril Oeste
	Argentina	Victorio Ramis	CF	7 July 1994 (age 32)	Argentinos Juniors

== Transfers ==
Domestic transfer windows:
3 July 2019 to 24 September 2019
20 January 2020 to 19 February 2020.

=== Transfers in ===
Date from	Position	Nationality	Name	From	Ref.
3 July 2019 (Note: Deal agreed on 27 May 2019)	LM	Argentina	Gabriel Alanís	Belgrano	
3 July 2019 (Note: Deal agreed on 11 June 2019)	FW	Argentina	Sebastián Lomonaco	Arsenal de Sarandí	
3 July 2019 (Note: Deal agreed on 11 June 2019)	FW	Argentina	Joaquín Mateo	Gimnasia y Tiro	
3 July 2019 (Note: Deal agreed on 11 June 2019)	RW	Argentina	Leandro Vella	Instituto	
3 July 2019 (Note: Deal agreed on 15 June 2019)	AM	Argentina	Juan Brunetta	Belgrano	
3 July 2019 (Note: Deal agreed on 28 June 2019)	CB	Argentina	Néstor Breitenbruch	Tigres UANL	
29 July 2019	CB	Paraguay	Miguel Jacquet	Nacional	

=== Transfers out ===
Date from	Position	Nationality	Name	To	Ref.
3 July 2019 (Note: Deal agreed on 25 June 2019)	LW	Argentina	Leandro Lencinas	Mitre	
3 July 2019 (Note: Deal agreed on 25 June 2019)	CM	Argentina	Agustín Verdugo	Mitre	
3 July 2019 (Note: Deal agreed on 26 June 2019)	RB	Argentina	Luciano Abecasis	Lanús	
3 July 2019 (Note: Deal agreed on 2 July 2019)	RW	Argentina	Fernando Núñez	Sarmiento	
6 July 2019	RM	Argentina	Ángel González	Estudiantes	
6 July 2019	RM	Argentina	Diego Sosa	Argentinos Juniors	
8 July 2019 (Note: Deal agreed on 13 May 2019)	CB	Paraguay	Diego Viera	Libertad	
8 July 2019 (Note: Deal agreed on 4 July 2019)	LB	Argentina	Facundo Cobos	Sol de América	
13 August 2019	DF	Argentina	Enzo Suraci	Independiente Rivadavia	

=== Loans out ===
Start date	Position	Nationality	Name	To	End date	Ref.
3 July 2019 (Note: Deal agreed on 15 June 2019)	CB	Argentina	Brian Alferez	Gimnasia y Esgrima (M)	30 June 2020	
3 July 2019 (Note: Deal agreed on 15 June 2019)	CB	Argentina	Victorio Ramis	Argentinos Juniors	30 June 2020	
25 July 2019	CB	Paraguay	Danilo Ortiz	Dorados de Sinaloa	2 September 2019	
15 August 2019	FW	Argentina	Lucas Agüero	All Boys	30 June 2020	
2 September 2019	CB	Paraguay	Danilo Ortiz	Elche	1 January 2020	

== Friendlies ==
=== Pre-season ===
In June, it was announced that Godoy Cruz would face league rivals Patronato (29 June), Unión Santa Fe (3 July) and Newell's Old Boys (6 July) in pre-season friendlies in Paraná, Santa Fe and Rosario. They would face their reserve team twice in the week preceding the Patronato encounter. Gimnasia y Esgrima of Mendoza were also an opponent of Godoy's.

Win Draw Loss

22 June 2019 Friendly	Godoy Cruz	1–0	Godoy Cruz Reserves	Argentina
	J. Brunetta 5'	Godoy Cruz

22 June 2019 Friendly	Godoy Cruz	1–1	Godoy Cruz Reserves	Argentina
	F. Gutiérrez	Godoy Cruz	T. Badaloni

29 June 2019 Friendly	Patronato	1–1	Godoy Cruz	Paraná, Argentina
	J. Barreto	Godoy Cruz; 70 min. match	S. García	Stadium: Estadio Presbítero Bartolomé Grella

29 June 2019 Friendly	Patronato	0–1	Godoy Cruz	Paraná, Argentina
		Godoy Cruz; 70 min. match	A. Manzur	Stadium: Estadio Presbítero Bartolomé Grella

3 July 2019 Friendly	Unión Santa Fe	1–0	Godoy Cruz	Santa Fe, Argentina
	F. Troyansky (pen.)	Godoy Cruz; 70 min. match		Stadium: Estadio 15 de Abril

3 July 2019 Friendly	Unión Santa Fe	0–2	Godoy Cruz	Santa Fe, Argentina
		Godoy Cruz; 70 min. match	M. Merentiel; J. Mateo	Stadium: Estadio 15 de Abril

6 July 2019 Friendly	Newell's Old Boys	2–0	Godoy Cruz	Rosario, Argentina
10:00 GMT-3	L. Leal	Godoy Cruz; Rosario3; 80 min. match		Stadium: Estadio Marcelo Bielsa

6 July 2019 Friendly	Newell's Old Boys	1–0	Godoy Cruz	Rosario, Argentina
	N. Funez	Godoy Cruz; Rosario3; 80 min. match		Stadium: Estadio Marcelo Bielsa

11 July 2019 Friendly	Gimnasia y Esgrima (M)	1–1	Godoy Cruz	Buenos Aires, Argentina
	N. Romano	Gimnasia y Esgrima; TyC Sports; 40 min. match	R. Prieto	Stadium: CeNARD

11 July 2019 Friendly	Gimnasia y Esgrima (M)	0–1	Godoy Cruz	Buenos Aires, Argentina
		Gimnasia y Esgrima; Diario UNO; 40 min. match	E. Bullaude	Stadium: CeNARD

=== Mid-season ===
Godoy played Deportivo Maipú in a mid-season match on 9 August.

Win Draw Loss

9 August 2019 Friendly	Deportivo Maipú	0–2	Godoy Cruz	Maipú, Argentina
		Godoy Cruz; Los Andes	J. Brunetta; S. García	Stadium: Predio de Coquimbito

9 August 2019 Friendly	Deportivo Maipú	0–0	Godoy Cruz	Maipú, Argentina
		Godoy Cruz; Olé		Stadium: Predio de Coquimbito

== Competitions ==
=== Primera División ===
==== League table ====
Pos	Team	Pld	W	D	L	GF	GA	GD	Pts
20	Patronato	23	5	8	10	22	34	−12	23
21	Huracán	23	5	7	11	17	27	−10	22
22	Aldosivi	23	6	4	13	20	35	−15	22
23	Colón	23	5	3	15	17	39	−22	18
24	Godoy Cruz	23	6	0	17	22	46	−24	18

Source: AFA
Rules for classification: 1) points; 2) play-off (only if needed to decide championship); 3) goal difference; 4) goals scored; 5) head-to-head points; 6) head-to-head goal difference; 7) head-to-head goals scored.

==== Relegation table ====
Pos	Team	2017–18 Pts	2018–19 Pts	2019–20 Pts	Total Pts	Total Pld	Avg	Relegation
5	River Plate	45	45	8	98	57	1.719	
6	Independiente	46	38	6	90	56	1.607	
7	Godoy Cruz	56	32	3	91	57	1.596	
8	Talleres (C)	46	33	10	89	57	1.561	
9	Huracán	48	35	5	88	57	1.544	

Source: AFA

==== Results summary ====
Overall								Home						Away					
Pld	W	D	L	GF	GA	GD	Pts	W	D	L	GF	GA	GD	W	D	L	GF	GA	GD
5	1	0	4	5	10	−5	3	1	0	1	2	3	−1	0	0	3	3	7	−4

Last updated: 1 September 2019.
Source: Soccerway

==== Matches ====
The fixtures for the 2019–20 campaign were released on 10 July.

Win Draw Loss

27 July 2019 1	San Lorenzo	3–2	Godoy Cruz	Buenos Aires, Argentina
15:30 GMT-3	N. Barrios 5'; G. Peruzzi 73'; N. Blandi 90+1' (pen.)	Godoy Cruz; Infobae; Soccerway	T. Badaloni 53'; R. Prieto 57'	Stadium: Estadio Pedro Bidegain; Referee: Andrés Merlos (Argentina)

5 August 2019 2	Godoy Cruz	0–2	Arsenal de Sarandí	Mendoza, Argentina
21:10 GMT-3		Godoy Cruz; Infobae; Soccerway	N. Giménez 12'; J. Soñora 90+3'	Stadium: Estadio Malvinas Argentinas; Referee: Patricio Loustau (Argentina)

19 August 2019 3	Atlético Tucumán	1–0	Godoy Cruz	San Miguel de Tucumán, Argentina
15:30 GMT-3	B. Bianchi 87'	Godoy Cruz; Infobae; Soccerway		Stadium: Estadio Monumental José Fierro; Referee: Darío Herrera (Argentina)

25 August 2019 4	Godoy Cruz	2–1	Estudiantes	Mendoza, Argentina
11:00 GMT-3	S. García 57'; F. Henríquez 65'	Godoy Cruz; Infobae; Soccerway	F. González 14'	Stadium: Estadio Malvinas Argentinas; Referee: Pablo Echavarría (Argentina)

31 August 2019 5	Racing Club	3–1	Godoy Cruz	Avellaneda, Argentina
20:00 GMT-3	D. Cvitanich 32'; L. López 43'; D. González 45+2'	Godoy Cruz; Infobae; Soccerway	S. García 38'	Stadium: Estadio Presidente Juan Domingo Perón; Referee: Germán Delfino (Argentina)

6	Godoy Cruz	–	Argentinos Juniors	Mendoza, Argentina
				Stadium: Estadio Malvinas Argentinas

=== Copa Argentina ===
Huracán were Godoy Cruz's opponents in the round of thirty-two of the Copa Argentina, with the tie to be played at the, as is customary, neutral venue of the Estadio Presidente Perón in Córdoba.

Win Draw Loss

14 July 2019 R32	Huracán	1–1 (1–2 p)	Godoy Cruz	Córdoba, Argentina
20:40 GMT-3	S. Salcedo 45+2'	Godoy Cruz; Infobae; Soccerway	J. Varela 28'	Stadium: Estadio Presidente Perón; Referee: Darío Herrera (Argentina)
	Penalties
	L. Gamba (penalty missed); A. Chávez (penalty missed); R. Gómez (penalty scored); S. Salcedo (penalty missed); L. Faravelli (penalty missed)		S. García (penalty scored); J. Brunetta (penalty missed); T. Cardona (penalty scored); J. Varela (penalty missed)

=== Copa de la Superliga ===
Win Draw Loss

	–
00:00 GMT-3

=== Copa Libertadores ===
Godoy Cruz were drawn to face Campeonato Brasileiro Série A outfit Palmeiras in the Copa Libertadores round of sixteen.

Win Draw Loss

23 July 2019 R16 L1	Godoy Cruz	2–2	Palmeiras	Mendoza, Argentina
21:30 GMT-3	S. García 6', 29'	Godoy Cruz; Infobae; Soccerway	F. Melo 34'; M. Borja 59'	Stadium: Estadio Malvinas Argentinas; Referee: Wilmar Roldán (Colombia)

30 July 2019 R16 L2	Palmeiras	4–0 (6–2 agg.)	Godoy Cruz	São Paulo, Brazil
21:30 GMT-3	R. Veiga 57' (pen.); M. Borja 74'; G. Scarpa 84'; Dudu 90+4'	Godoy Cruz; Infobae; Soccerway		Stadium: Allianz Parque; Referee: Esteban Ostojich (Uruguay)

== Squad statistics ==
=== Appearances and goals ===
No.	Pos.	Nationality	Name	League		Cup		League Cup		Continental		Total		Discipline		Ref
No.	Pos.	Nationality	Name	Apps	Goals	Apps	Goals	Apps	Goals	Apps	Goals	Apps	Goals	Yellow card	Red card	Ref
1	GK	Argentina	Roberto Ramírez	5	0	0	0	0	0	0	0	5	0	0	0	
2	CB	Argentina	Joaquín Varela	3(1)	0	1	1	0	0	2	0	6(1)	1	2	0	
3	CB	Paraguay	Miguel Jacquet	1	0	0	0	0	0	0	0	1	0	2	1	
4	LB	Argentina	Agustín Aleo	1(2)	0	0(1)	0	0	0	1	0	2(3)	0	3	0	
6	CB	Argentina	Tomás Cardona	5	0	1	0	0	0	2	0	8	0	3	0	
7	LM	Paraguay	Richard Prieto	1(1)	1	0(1)	0	0	0	0(2)	0	1(4)	1	1	0	
8	CM	Argentina	Facundo Barboza	1(1)	0	0	0	0	0	0	0	1(1)	0	0	0	
9	FW	Uruguay	Miguel Merentiel	1(1)	0	1	0	0	0	2	0	4(1)	0	1	0	
11	RW	Argentina	Leandro Vella	2(1)	0	0	0	0	0	0	0	2(1)	0	1	0	
12	GK	Argentina	Andrés Mehring	0	0	1	0	0	0	2	0	3	0	0	0	
14	DF	Argentina	Agustín Pereyra	0	0	0	0	0	0	0	0	0	0	0	0	
15	CB	Argentina	Marcos Rouzies	1	0	0	0	0	0	0	0	1	0	0	0	
16	CM	Argentina	Agustín Manzur	3(1)	0	0	0	0	0	0(2)	0	3(3)	0	1	1	
17	DF	Argentina	Marcelo Freites	0(1)	0	0	0	0	0	0	0	0(1)	0	0	0	
18	CF	Uruguay	Santiago García	4(1)	2	1	0	0	0	2	2	7(1)	4	2	0	
19	CM	Argentina	Fabián Henríquez	3	1	1	0	0	0	0	0	4	1	3	0	
20	CB	Argentina	Néstor Breitenbruch	4	0	0	0	0	0	1	0	5	0	1	0	
21	LM	Argentina	Gabriel Alanís	2	0	1	0	0	0	0	0	3	0	1	0	
22	CB	Argentina	Nahuel Arena	2	0	0	0	0	0	2	0	4	0	1	0	
23	FW	Argentina	Joaquín Mateo	0	0	0	0	0	0	0	0	0	0	0	0	
24	CM	Argentina	Facundo Gutiérrez	3(1)	0	1	0	0	0	2	0	6(1)	0	0	0	
25	GK	Argentina	Juan Cruz Bolado	0	0	0	0	0	0	0	0	0	0	0	0	
26	AM	Argentina	Juan Brunetta	4	0	1	0	0	0	2	0	7	0	1	0	
27	CM	Argentina	Iván Smith	0	0	0	0	0	0	0	0	0	0	0	0	
29	CF	Argentina	Tomás Badaloni	1(3)	1	0	0	0	0	0	0	1(3)	1	0	0	
30	DM	Argentina	Juan Andrada	4	0	1	0	0	0	2	0	7	0	1	0	
31	LM	Argentina	Agustín Álvarez	1	0	1	0	0	0	0	0	2	0	0	0	
32	CB	Argentina	Facundo Rodríguez	0	0	0	0	0	0	0	0	0	0	0	0	
33	RW	Argentina	Ezequiel Bullaude	1	0	0	0	0	0	2	0	3	0	0	0	
34	MF	Argentina	Daniel Molina	0	0	0	0	0	0	0	0	0	0	0	0	
35	GK	Argentina United States	Matías Soria	0	0	0	0	0	0	0	0	0	0	0	0	
36	CM	Argentina	Franco González	2	0	0	0	0	0	0	0	2	0	0	0	
38	CM	Argentina	Hernán Bernardello	0	0	0	0	0	0	0	0	0	0	0	0	
39	AM	Argentina	Valentín Burgoa	0	0	0(1)	0	0	0	0	0	0(1)	0	0	0	
–	FW	Argentina	Lucas Agüero	0	0	0	0	0	0	0	0	0	0	0	0	
–	CB	Argentina	Brian Alferez	0	0	0	0	0	0	0	0	0	0	0	0	
–	LB	Argentina	Fabrizio Angileri	0	0	0	0	0	0	0	0	0	0	0	0	
–	CF	Paraguay	Gabriel Ávalos	0	0	0	0	0	0	0	0	0	0	0	0	
–	MF	Argentina	Julián García	0	0	0	0	0	0	0	0	0	0	0	0	
–	FW	Argentina	Sebastián Lomonaco	0	0	0	0	0	0	0	0	0	0	0	0	
–	RB	Argentina	Sebastián Olivarez	0	0	0	0	0	0	0	0	0	0	0	0	
–	DM	Argentina	Luciano Pizarro	0	0	0	0	0	0	0	0	0	0	0	0	
–	CF	Argentina	Victorio Ramis	0	0	0	0	0	0	0	0	0	0	0	0	
Own goals				—	0	—	0	—	0	—	0	—	0	—	—	—

Statistics accurate as of 1 September 2019.

=== Goalscorers ===
Rank	Pos	No.	Nat	Name	League	Cup	League Cup	Continental	Total	Ref
1	CF	18	Uruguay	Santiago García	2	0	0	2	4	
2	CB	2	Argentina	Joaquín Varela	0	1	0	0	1	
2	LM	40	Paraguay	Richard Prieto	1	0	0	0	1	
2	CF	29	Argentina	Tomás Badaloni	1	0	0	0	1	
2	CM	19	Argentina	Fabián Henríquez	1	0	0	0	1	
Own goals					0	0	0	0	0	
Totals					5	1	0	2	8	—
