= Marcos Rouzies =

Argentine professional footballer

Personal information
- Full name: Marcos Sebastián Rouzies
- Date of birth: 22 May 1997 (age 29)
- Place of birth: Godoy Cruz, Argentina
- Height: 1.82 m (6 ft 0 in)
- Position: Centre-back

Team information
- Current team: Gimnasia Concepción

Youth career
- Godoy Cruz

Senior career*
Years	Team	Apps	(Gls)
2019–2020	Godoy Cruz	1	(0)
2020–2021	Deportivo Armenio	27	(1)
2022	Deportivo Maipú	2	(0)
2022–	Gimnasia Concepción	0	(0)
- * Club domestic league appearances and goals as of 07:26, 20 August 2022 (UTC)

Marcos Sebastián Rouzies (born 22 May 1997) is an Argentine professional footballer who plays as a centre-back for Gimnasia Concepción.

== Career ==
Rouzies began his career in the system of Godoy Cruz. Prior to his senior bow, the centre-back was an unused substitute on two occasions; in the Primera División versus Boca Juniors and in the Copa Libertadores against Palmeiras. He made his debut on 27 July 2019, starting an eventual 3–2 loss to San Lorenzo in Godoy's opening fixture of 2019–20; though was substituted off for Agustín Aleo at half-time. Rouzies left in mid-2020, subsequently heading to Primera B Metropolitana with Deportivo Armenio. His first appearances arrived in December against San Telmo, San Miguel, Defensores Unidos and Talleres.

In June 2022, Rouzies joined Gimnasia Concepción.

== Career statistics ==
As of 30 December 2020.

Appearances and goals by club, season and competition
Club	Season	League			Cup		League Cup		Continental		Other		Total	
Club	Season	Division	Apps	Goals	Apps	Goals	Apps	Goals	Apps	Goals	Apps	Goals	Apps	Goals
Godoy Cruz	2018–19	Primera División	0	0	0	0	0	0	0	0	0	0	0	0
Godoy Cruz	2019–20	Primera División	1	0	0	0	0	0	0	0	0	0	1	0
Godoy Cruz	Total		1	0	0	0	0	0	0	0	0	0	1	0
Deportivo Armenio	2020	Primera B Metropolitana	4	0	0	0	—		—		0	0	4	0
Career total			5	0	0	0	0	0	0	0	0	0	5	0
