= Ivan Smith =

Ivan Smith may refer to:

- Iván Smith (Argentine footballer) (born 1999), Argentine footballer
- Ivan Smith (Australian footballer) (born 1933), Australian rules footballer
- Ivan Smith (mathematician) (born 1973), British mathematician
- Ivan Smith (politician)
