= 2017–18 Godoy Cruz Antonio Tomba season =

Godoy Cruz
2017–18 season
- Chairman: José Eduardo Mansur
- Manager: Lucas Bernardi (until 5 July 2017); Mauricio Larriera (from 12 July 2017 to 5 December 2017); Diego Dabove (from 13 December 2017)
- Stadium: Estadio Malvinas Argentinas
- Primera División: 12th
- 2016–17 Copa Argentina: Quarter-finals
- 2017–18 Copa Argentina: Round of 64
- Copa Libertadores: Round of 16
- Top goalscorer: League: Santiago García (4); All: Santiago García (6)

The 2017–18 season is Godoy Cruz Antonio Tomba's 11th consecutive season in the top-flight of Argentine football. The season covers the period from 1 July 2017 to 30 June 2018.

== Current squad ==
As of 6 September 2017.

Note: Flags indicate national team as defined under FIFA eligibility rules; some limited exceptions apply. Players may hold more than one non-FIFA nationality.

No.	Pos.	Nation	Player
2	DF	ARG	Leonel Galeano
5	DF	PAR	Diego Viera
7	FW	ARG	Juan Garro
8	MF	ARG	Facundo Silva
9	FW	ARG	Javier Correa
11	MF	ARG	Guillermo Fernández
12	GK	ARG	Roberto Ramírez
14	DF	ARG	Sebastián Olivarez
15	MF	ARG	Walter Serrano
16	MF	ARG	Luciano Pizarro
17	FW	ARG	Fernando Núñez
18	FW	URU	Santiago García
19	MF	ARG	Fabián Henríquez
20	MF	ARG	Ángel Gonzalez
21	MF	ARG	Fabrizio Angileri

No.	Pos.	Nation	Player
22	DF	ARG	Ezequiel Bonacorso
24	GK	ARG	Juan Bolado
26	MF	ARG	Agustín Verdugo
28	MF	ARG	Facundo Cobos
29	DF	ARG	Luciano Abecasis
30	MF	ARG	Juan Andrada
33	MF	ARG	Luis De Faría
36	DF	ARG	Luciano Lapetina
—	DF	PAR	Cristian Báez
—	MF	URU	Felipe Rodríguez
—	GK	URU	Leonardo Burián
—	GK	ARG	Ramiro Martínez
—	DF	ARG	Tomás Cardona (on loan from San Lorenzo)
—	FW	ARG	Victorio Ramis

=== Out on loan ===
Note: Flags indicate national team as defined under FIFA eligibility rules; some limited exceptions apply. Players may hold more than one non-FIFA nationality.

No.	Pos.	Nation	Player
6	DF	PAR	Danilo Ortiz (at Newell's Old Boys until 30 June 2018)
23	FW	URU	Maximiliano Sigales (at Boston River until 31 July 2018)

No.	Pos.	Nation	Player
35	MF	ARG	Maximiliano Correa (at Instituto until 30 June 2018)
—	DF	ARG	Gastón Suso (at Estudiantes until 30 June 2018)

== Transfers ==
=== In ===
Date	Pos.	Name	From	Fee
1 July 2017	GK	(Argentina) Ramiro Martínez	(Argentina) Boca Juniors	Undisclosed
11 July 2017	MF	(Uruguay) Felipe Rodríguez	(Ecuador) LDU Quito	Undisclosed
29 July 2017	GK	(Uruguay) Leonardo Burián	(Mexico) Chiapas	Undisclosed
2 August 2017	FW	(Argentina) Victorio Ramis	(Argentina) Talleres	Undisclosed
14 August 2017	DF	(Paraguay) Cristian Báez	(Mexico) Dorados de Sinaloa	Undisclosed

=== Out ===
Date	Pos.	Name	To	Fee
6 July 2017	DF	(Argentina) Esteban Burgos	(Spain) Alcorcón	Undisclosed
12 July 2017	GK	(Argentina) Rodrigo Rey	(Greece) PAOK	Undisclosed
23 July 2017	MF	(Argentina) Gabriel Carabajal	(Argentina) San Martín	Undisclosed
25 July 2017	GK	(Argentina) Sebastián Moyano	(Argentina) Aldosivi	Undisclosed
17 August 2017	MF	(Argentina) Nicolás Sánchez	(Argentina) Villa Dálmine	Undisclosed
30 August 2017	MF	(Uruguay) Diego Poyet	(Cyprus) Pafos	Undisclosed

=== Loan in ===
Date from	Date to	Pos.	Name	From
25 July 2017	30 June 2018	DF	(Argentina) Tomás Cardona	(Argentina) San Lorenzo

=== Loan out ===
Date from	Date to	Pos.	Name	To
19 July 2017	31 July 2018	FW	(Uruguay) Maximiliano Sigales	(Uruguay) Boston River
31 July 2017	30 June 2018	DF	(Paraguay) Danilo Ortiz	(Argentina) Newell's Old Boys
17 August 2017	30 June 2018	MF	(Argentina) Maximiliano Correa	(Argentina) Instituto

== Friendlies ==
=== Pre-season ===
Win Draw Loss

2 August 2017 Friendly	San Lorenzo (Argentina)	1–0	(Argentina) Godoy Cruz	Buenos Aires, Argentina
09:30	N. Reniero 19'	Report		Stadium: San Lorenzo Ciudad Deportiva

19 August 2017 Friendly	Godoy Cruz (Argentina)	1–0	(Argentina) Sportivo Desamparados	Coquimbito, Argentina
	F. Rodríguez	Report		Stadium: Predio de Coquimbito

19 August 2017 Friendly	Godoy Cruz (Argentina)	0–0	(Argentina) Sportivo Desamparados	Coquimbito, Argentina
		Report		Stadium: Predio de Coquimbito

== Primera División ==
=== League table ===
Pos	Team	Pld	W	D	L	GF	GA	GD	Pts	Qualification
1	Boca Juniors (C)	27	18	4	5	50	22	+28	58	Qualification for Copa Libertadores group stage
2	Godoy Cruz	27	17	5	5	45	24	+21	56	Qualification for Copa Libertadores group stage
3	San Lorenzo	27	14	8	5	31	20	+11	50	Qualification for Copa Libertadores group stage
4	Huracán	27	13	9	5	35	24	+11	48	Qualification for Copa Libertadores group stage
5	Talleres (C)	27	13	7	7	33	20	+13	46	Qualification for Copa Libertadores second stage

Source: AFA
Rules for classification: 1) points; 2) play-off (only if needed to decide championship); 3) goal difference; 4) goals scored; 5) head-to-head points; 6) head-to-head goal difference; 7) head-to-head goals scored.
(C) Champions

=== Results by matchday ===
Matchday	1	2	3	4	5	6	7	8	9	10	11	12	13	14	15	16	17	18	19	20	21	22	23	24	25	26	27
Ground	A	H	A	H	A	H	A	H	A	A	H	A	H														
Result	L	W	L	W	D	W	L	W	D	W	P	L															
Position	22	11	20	12	16	13	13	10	10	6	8	12															

Updated to match(es) played on 12 December 2017. Source: Soccerway
A = Away; H = Home; W = Win; D = Draw; L = Loss; P = Postponed

27 August 2017 1	Atlético Tucumán (Argentina)	2–1	(Argentina) Godoy Cruz	San Miguel de Tucumán, Argentina
14:05	F. Sbuttoni 17'; L. Rodríguez 23'	Report	S. Olivarez 58'	Stadium: Estadio Monumental José Fierro; Referee: Jorge Baliño (Argentina)

10 September 2017 2	Godoy Cruz (Argentina)	2–1	(Argentina) Talleres	Mendoza, Argentina
14:05	J. Garro 29'; S. García 90+4'	Report	J. Rojas 83'	Stadium: Estadio Malvinas Argentinas; Referee: Darío Herrera (Argentina)

17 September 2017 3	Boca Juniors (Argentina)	4–1	(Argentina) Godoy Cruz	Buenos Aires, Argentina
18:05	P. Pérez 20', 39'; C. Pavón 68'; N. Nández 86'	Report	L. Galeano 12'	Stadium: La Bombonera; Referee: Germán Delfino (Argentina)

23 September 2017 4	Godoy Cruz (Argentina)	1–0	(Argentina) Independiente	Mendoza, Argentina
20:05	S. García 60' (pen.)	Report		Stadium: Estadio Malvinas Argentinas; Referee: Patricio Loustau (Argentina)

2 October 2017 5	Newell's Old Boys (Argentina)	0–0	(Argentina) Godoy Cruz	Rosario, Argentina
21:05		Report		Stadium: Estadio Marcelo Bielsa; Referee: Andrés Merlos (Argentina)

15 October 2017 6	Godoy Cruz (Argentina)	3–0	(Argentina) Gimnasia y Esgrima	Mendoza, Argentina
14:05	L. Licht 6' (o.g.); F. Cobos 39'; J. Correa 75'	Report		Stadium: Estadio Malvinas Argentinas; Referee: Silvio Trucco (Argentina)

28 October 2017 7	Unión Santa Fe (Argentina)	2–0	(Argentina) Godoy Cruz	Santa Fe, Argentina
14:00	L. Gamba 52' (pen.); D. Zabala 77'	Report		Stadium: Estadio 15 de Abril; Referee: Pablo Echavarría (Argentina)

3 November 2017 8	Godoy Cruz (Argentina)	2–1	(Argentina) Huracán	Mendoza, Argentina
21:05	Á. Gonzalez 43'; S. García 73'	Report	I. Pussetto 49'	Stadium: Estadio Malvinas Argentinas; Referee: Diego Abal (Argentina)

20 November 2017 9	Olimpo (Argentina)	1–1	(Argentina) Godoy Cruz	Bahía Blanca, Argentina
19:15	F. Troyansky 30'	Report	S. García 62'	Stadium: Estadio Roberto Natalio Carminatti; Referee: Ariel Penel (Argentina)

23 November 2017 10	Vélez Sarsfield (Argentina)	0–1	(Argentina) Godoy Cruz	Buenos Aires, Argentina
19:15		Report	V. Ramis 69'	Stadium: José Amalfitani Stadium; Referee: Fernando Echenique (Argentina)

26 November 2017 11	Godoy Cruz (Argentina)	Postponed	(Argentina) Lanús	Mendoza, Argentina
17:00		Report		Stadium: Estadio Malvinas Argentinas; Referee: Darío Herrera (Argentina)

1 December 2017 12	Defensa y Justicia (Argentina)	3–2	(Argentina) Godoy Cruz	Buenos Aires, Argentina
19:15	N. Fernández 7', 59'; L. Abecasis 82' (o.g.)	Report	Á. Gonzalez 71'; J. Correa 73'	Stadium: Estadio Norberto "Tito" Tomaghello; Referee: Hernán Mastrángelo (Argentina)

January 2018 13	Godoy Cruz (Argentina)	–	(Argentina) Chacarita Juniors	Mendoza, Argentina
		Report		Stadium: Estadio Malvinas Argentinas

== Copa Argentina ==
Win Draw Loss

5 September 2017 R32	Newell's Old Boys (Argentina)	1–2	(Argentina) Godoy Cruz	Santa Fe, Argentina
21:10	L. Galeano 24' (o.g.)	Report	F. Rodríguez 30'; S. García 90+1'	Stadium: Estadio 15 de Abril; Referee: Luis Álvarez (Argentina)

28 September 2017 R16	Godoy Cruz (Argentina)	2–1	(Argentina) Banfield	Avellaneda, Argentina
17:00	V. Ramis 21'; G. Giménez 64'	Report	D. Cvitanich 45'	Stadium: Estadio Presidente Juan Domingo Perón; Referee: Federico Beligoy (Argentina)

23 October 2017 QF	Godoy Cruz (Argentina)	2–3	(Argentina) Rosario Central	Avellaneda, Argentina
18:00	S. García 7'; F. Angileri 43'	Report	W. Camacho 61'; F. Carrizo 76'; F. Zampedri 88'	Stadium: Estadio Presidente Juan Domingo Perón; Referee: Ariel Penel (Argentina)

== Copa Libertadores ==
Win Draw Loss

=== Round of 16 ===
4 July 2017 First leg	Godoy Cruz (Argentina)	0–1	(Brazil) Grêmio	Mendoza, Argentina
19:15		Report	Ramiro 1'	Stadium: Estadio Malvinas Argentinas; Referee: Víctor Carrillo (Peru)

9 August 2017 Second leg	Grêmio (Brazil)	2–1 (agg: 3–1)	(Argentina) Godoy Cruz	Porto Alegre, Brazil
19:15	P. Rocha 28', 59'	Report	J. Correa 13'	Stadium: Arena do Grêmio; Referee: Enrique Cáceres (Paraguay)
