= Tomás Badaloni =

Argentine footballer

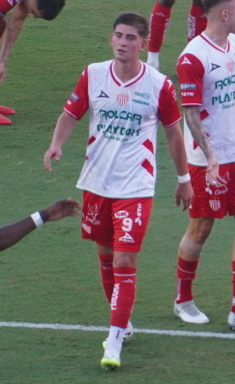
- Badaloni with Necaxa in 2025

Personal information
- Full name: Tomás Oscar Badaloni
- Date of birth: 2 May 2000 (age 26)
- Place of birth: Villanueva, Argentina
- Height: 1.87 m (6 ft 2 in)
- Position: Centre-forward

Team information
- Current team: Rosario Central
- Number: 16

Youth career
- 2017–2019: Godoy Cruz

Senior career*
Years	Team	Apps	(Gls)
2017–2024	Godoy Cruz	128	(20)
2023	→ Tigre (loan)	25	(4)
2024–2026	Necaxa	62	(13)
2026–	Rosario Central	1	(0)
- * Club domestic league appearances and goals as of 17:08, 26 July 2026 (UTC)

Tomás Oscar Badaloni (born 2 May 2000) is an Argentine professional footballer who plays as a centre-forward for Rosario Central.

== Career ==
=== Early career ===
After playing futsal with Alianza Guaymallén, Badaloni signed for local team Club Leonardo Murialdo in 2012, before moving to Godoy Cruz in 2016.

=== Godoy Cruz ===
His first experience of first-team football came in May 2018, with Diego Dabove selecting him as substitute for Primera División fixtures against River Plate and Argentinos Juniors; though he did not come on. Badaloni was again on the bench in July 2019, versus Huracán in the Copa Argentina, prior to appearing for his professional debut against San Lorenzo on 27 July under Lucas Bernardi; playing for the full duration of a 3–2 defeat, with the centre-forward scoring his first goal in the process. In the summer of 2019, he extended his contract with the club. In September 2022, Badaloni reach the 100 games mark with Godoy Cruz.

On 14 January 2023, he joined Tigre on a one-year loan.

=== Necaxa ===
On 31 July 2024, Badaloni joined Mexican side Necaxa.

== Career statistics ==
As of 2 April 2025.

Appearances and goals by club, season and competition
Club	Season	League			Cup		League Cup		Continental (Note: Includes appearances in Copa Sudamericana, Copa Libertadores, and Leagues Cup.)		Total	
Club	Season	Division	Apps	Goals	Apps	Goals	Apps	Goals	Apps	Goals	Apps	Goals
Godoy Cruz	2019–20	Primera División	19	3	0	0	1	1	—		20	4
Godoy Cruz	2020–21 (Note: Soccerway counts Copa de la Liga Profesional appearances as league appearances.)	Primera División	11	2	5	0	0	0	—		16	2
Godoy Cruz	2021	Primera División	37	7	0	0	0	0	—		37	7
Godoy Cruz	2022	Primera División	33	2	0	0	0	0	—		33	2
Godoy Cruz	2024	Primera División	15	4	2	1	0	0	2	0	19	5
Godoy Cruz	Total		115	18	7	1	1	0	2	0	125	20
Tigre (loan)	2023	Primera División	20	2	1	1	0	0	4	1	25	4
Necaxa	2024–25	Liga MX	25	4	0	0	—		2	0	27	4
Career total			160	24	8	2	1	1	6	1	177	28

== Honours ==
Rosario Central

- Supercopa Internacional: 2026
