= Marcelo Freites =

Argentine footballer

Personal information
- Date of birth: 12 July 1998 (age 28)
- Place of birth: San Luis, Argentina
- Height: 1.80 m (5 ft 11 in)
- Position: Forward

Team information
- Current team: Alvear FBC

Youth career
- Godoy Cruz

Senior career*
Years	Team	Apps	(Gls)
2019–2022	Godoy Cruz	9	(0)
2020	→ Instituto (loan)	5	(1)
2022–	Alvear FBC		
- * Club domestic league appearances and goals as of 09:57, 16 January 2021 (UTC)

Marcelo Freites (born 12 July 1998) is an Argentine footballer who plays as a forward for Alvear FBC.

== Career ==
Freites is a product of Godoy Cruz's youth academy. Javier Patalano promoted the forward into his senior squad early in the 2019–20 season, with his professional debut arriving on 31 August 2019 in a 3–1 loss away to reigning champions Racing Club; he was substituted on in the second half, in place of Franco González.

== Career statistics ==
As of 1 September 2019.

Appearances and goals by club, season and competition
Club	Season	League			Cup		League Cup		Continental		Other		Total	
Club	Season	Division	Apps	Goals	Apps	Goals	Apps	Goals	Apps	Goals	Apps	Goals	Apps	Goals
Godoy Cruz	2019–20	Primera División	1	0	0	0	0	0	0	0	0	0	1	0
Career total			1	0	0	0	0	0	0	0	0	0	1	0
