= Agustín Álvarez =

Agustín Álvarez may refer to:

- Agustín Romualdo Álvarez Rodríguez (1923–2011), Spanish Roman Catholic bishop
- Agustín Álvarez (footballer, born 2000), Argentine football defender for Sportivo Estudiantes
- Agustín Álvarez (footballer, born April 2001), Uruguayan football midfielder for Unión La Calera
- Agustín Álvarez (footballer, born May 2001), Uruguayan football forward for Elche
