= Agustín Aleo =

Argentine footballer (born 1998)

Personal information
- Full name: Agustín Ignacio Aleo
- Date of birth: 20 May 1998 (age 28)
- Place of birth: Godoy Cruz, Argentina
- Height: 1.78 m (5 ft 10 in)
- Position: Left-back

Team information
- Current team: Alvarado

Youth career
- Club Alemán
- Coquimbito Maipú
- Godoy Cruz

Senior career*
Years	Team	Apps	(Gls)
2018–2021	Godoy Cruz	18	(0)
2020–2021	→ Argentinos Juniors (loan)	0	(0)
2021–2022	Ferro Carril Oeste	26	(0)
2022–2023	Güemes	29	(0)
2023–2024	Boyacá Chicó	31	(0)
2024–2026	Alvarado	47	(1)
2026–	Central Norte	7	(0)
- * Club domestic league appearances and goals as of 17:11, 24 April 2026 (UTC)

Agustín Ignacio Aleo (born 20 May 1998) is an Argentine professional footballer who plays as a left-back for Central Norte.

== Career ==
Aleo began in the ranks of Club Alemán, before moving onto Coquimbito Maipú and Godoy Cruz. Diego Dabove, for the latter, selected him on the substitutes bench for a 2017–18 Primera División fixture with Arsenal de Sarandí though never selected him, a scenario which was repeated three more times throughout 2018–19. He made his bow in professional football on 18 February 2019 against Racing Club, starting an away defeat at the Estadio Presidente Juan Domingo Perón.

In January 2020, Aleo joined Argentinos Juniors on loan with a purchase option until mid-January 2021. Aleo returned to Godoy Cruz in January 2021, but wasn't however a part of the plans. In the following month, Aleo joined Ferro Carril Oeste. At the end of January 2022, Aleao joined Atlético Güemes.

== Career statistics ==
As of 23 June 2020.

Appearances and goals by club, season and competition
Club	Season	League			Cup		Continental		Other		Total	
Club	Season	Division	Apps	Goals	Apps	Goals	Apps	Goals	Apps	Goals	Apps	Goals
Godoy Cruz	2017–18	Primera División	0	0	0	0	—		0	0	0	0
Godoy Cruz	2018–19	Primera División	6	0	0	0	0	0	0	0	6	0
Godoy Cruz	2019–20	Primera División	12	0	0	0	0	0	0	0	12	0
Godoy Cruz	Total		18	0	0	0	0	0	0	0	18	0
Argentinos Juniors (loan)	2019–20	Primera División	0	0	0	0	0	0	0	0	0	0
Career total			18	0	0	0	0	0	0	0	18	0
