= Lucas Agüero =

Argentinian football player (born 1997)

Personal information
- Full name: Lucas Ezequiel Agüero
- Date of birth: 28 April 1997 (age 29)
- Place of birth: Godoy Cruz, Argentina
- Height: 1.78 m (5 ft 10 in)
- Position: Forward

Team information
- Current team: Huracán Las Heras

Youth career
- Godoy Cruz

Senior career*
Years	Team	Apps	(Gls)
2018–2020	Godoy Cruz	2	(0)
2019–2020	→ All Boys (loan)	3	(0)
2020–	Huracán Las Heras	34	(7)
- * Club domestic league appearances and goals as of 15:09, 6 June 2022 (UTC)

Lucas Ezequiel Agüero (born 28 April 1997) is an Argentine professional footballer who plays as a forward for Huracán Las Heras.

== Career ==
Agüero's career began with Godoy Cruz. He was promoted into their senior squad in the 2017–18 Primera División campaign, a season in which he made his first professional appearances in after being substituted on during fixtures with Arsenal de Sarandí and Estudiantes in March 2018. He was later an unused substitute against Tigre in May, as Godoy Cruz finished 2nd in the Primera División table. Agüero spent the 2019–20 season out on loan in Primera B Nacional with All Boys. He made just four appearances, partly due to injury. In August 2020, Agüero joined Torneo Federal A's Huracán Las Heras.

== Career statistics ==
As of 30 September 2020.

Club statistics
Club	Season	League			Cup		League Cup		Continental		Other		Total	
Club	Season	Division	Apps	Goals	Apps	Goals	Apps	Goals	Apps	Goals	Apps	Goals	Apps	Goals
Godoy Cruz	2017–18	Primera División	2	0	0	0	—		0	0	0	0	2	0
Godoy Cruz	2018–19	Primera División	0	0	0	0	0	0	0	0	0	0	0	0
Godoy Cruz	2019–20	Primera División	0	0	0	0	0	0	0	0	0	0	0	0
Godoy Cruz	Total		2	0	0	0	0	0	0	0	0	0	2	0
All Boys (loan)	2019–20	Primera B Nacional	3	0	1	0	—		—		0	0	4	0
Huracán Las Heras	2020–21	Torneo Federal A	0	0	0	0	—		—		0	0	0	0
Career total			5	0	1	0	0	0	0	0	0	0	6	0
