= Miguel Jacquet =

Paraguayan footballer (born 1995)

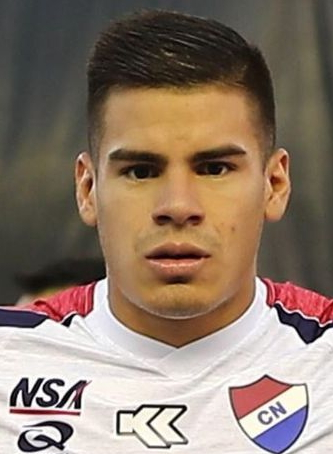
- Paraguayan professional footballer

Personal information
- Full name: Miguel Isaías Jacquet Duarte
- Date of birth: 20 May 1995 (age 31)
- Place of birth: Asunción, Paraguay
- Height: 1.83 m (6 ft 0 in)
- Position: Centre-back

Team information
- Current team: Libertad
- Number: 27

Youth career
- Nacional Asunción

Senior career*
Years	Team	Apps	(Gls)
2014–2019	Nacional Asunción	133	(5)
2019	Godoy Cruz	9	(0)
2020	Nacional Montevideo	2	(0)
2021	12 de Octubre	10	(0)
2021–2022	Sol de América	30	(0)
2022	Nacional Asunción	21	(1)
2023	Platense	17	(0)
2024–	Libertad	14	(0)
- * Club domestic league appearances and goals as of 12 August 2025

Miguel Isaías Jacquet Duarte (born 20 May 1995) is a Paraguayan professional footballer who plays as a centre-back for Libertad.

== Career ==
Jacquet began his footballing career in his homeland with Nacional. He appeared for his professional debut in April 2014, featuring for the full duration of a four-goal victory away to Guaraní in the Paraguayan Primera División. Fifty-four appearances came in his first three seasons in the top-flight. In the 2017 campaign, Jacquet played forty times across the Primera División and the Copa Sudamericana; netting four goals in the process, including against Guaraní in the league and versus Estudiantes on the continent. During his time with Nacional, Jacquet was linked with moves away to Universidad de Concepción, Gimnasia y Esgrima and KV Mechelen.

On 29 July 2019, after one hundred and forty-two matches for Nacional, Jacquet departed to Argentine Primera División side Godoy Cruz. He left the club again at the end of the year, and joined Uruguayan club Club Nacional de Football in late January 2020.

== Career statistics ==
As of 30 July 2019.

Appearances and goals by club, season and competition
Club	Season	League			Cup		League Cup		Continental		Other		Total	
Club	Season	Division	Apps	Goals	Apps	Goals	Apps	Goals	Apps	Goals	Apps	Goals	Apps	Goals
Nacional	2014	Paraguayan Primera División	8	0	—		—		0	0	0	0	8	0
Nacional	2015	Paraguayan Primera División	16	0	—		—		0	0	0	0	16	0
Nacional	2016	Paraguayan Primera División	30	0	—		—		—		0	0	30	0
Nacional	2017	Paraguayan Primera División	33	3	—		—		7 (Note: Appearance(s) in the Copa Sudamericana)	1	0	0	40	4
Nacional	2018	Paraguayan Primera División	26	2	0	0	—		0	0	0	0	26	2
Nacional	2019	Paraguayan Primera División	20	0	0	0	—		2 (Note: Appearance(s) in the Copa Libertadores)	0	0	0	22	0
Nacional	Total		133	5	0	0	—		9	1	0	0	142	6
Godoy Cruz	2019–20	Argentine Primera División	0	0	0	0	0	0	0	0	0	0	0	0
Career total			133	5	0	0	0	0	9	1	0	0	142	6
