= Agustín Manzur =

Argentinian association football player

Personal information
- Full name: Enzo Agustín Manzur
- Date of birth: 29 September 2000 (age 26)
- Place of birth: Mendoza, Argentina
- Height: 1.69 m (5 ft 7 in)
- Position: Midfielder

Team information
- Current team: Guaraní

Youth career
- Godoy Cruz

Senior career*
Years	Team	Apps	(Gls)
2018–2021	Godoy Cruz	16	(0)
2021	→ Deportivo Maipú (loan)	11	(1)
2022–2024	Deportivo Maipú	67	(1)
2024	→ Guaraní (loan)	41	(1)
2025–	Guaraní	54	(5)

International career^{‡}
2025–	Palestine	8	(0)
- * Club domestic league appearances and goals as of 12 August 2026 ‡ National team caps and goals as of 14 November 2026

Enzo Agustín Manzur (Arabic: أوغسطين منظور; born 29 September 2000) is a professional footballer who plays as a midfielder for Paraguayan club Guaraní. Born in Argentina, he plays for the Palestine football team.

== Club career ==
Manzur's career began with Godoy Cruz. He was moved into the first-team during the 2017–18 Argentine Primera División season, making two substitute appearances in early 2018 in victories against Chacarita Juniors and Lanús.

On 18 February 2021, Manzur joined Deportivo Maipú on loan. In January 2022, he signed a two-year permanently deal with the club.

== International career ==
Born in Argentina, Manzur is of Palestinian descent. He was selected for Argentina U19 training in March 2018. He debuted with the Palestine national team for a 2–0 2026 FIFA World Cup qualification win against Kuwait on 6 June 2025.

== Career statistics ==
As of match played 4 August 2018

Club statistics
Club	Season	League			Cup (Note: Includes the Copa Argentina)		League Cup		Continental (Note: Includes the Copa Libertadores)		Other		Total	
Club	Season	Division	Apps	Goals	Apps	Goals	Apps	Goals	Apps	Goals	Apps	Goals	Apps	Goals
Godoy Cruz	2017–18	Primera División	3	0	0	0	—		0	0	0	0	3	0
Godoy Cruz	2018–19	Primera División	0	0	0	0	—		0	0	0	0	0	0
Career total			3	0	0	0	—		0	0	0	0	3	0
