= Franco González =

Franco González may refer to:

- Franco González (footballer, born 1999), Argentine midfielder
- Franco González (footballer, born 2004), Uruguayan midfielder
