= Néstor Breitenbruch =

Argentine footballer (born 1995)

Personal information
- Full name: Néstor Adriel Breitenbruch
- Date of birth: 13 September 1995 (age 31)
- Place of birth: Posadas, Argentina
- Height: 1.78 m (5 ft 10 in)
- Position: Centre-back

Team information
- Current team: Aldosivi
- Number: 25

Senior career*
Years	Team	Apps	(Gls)
2014–2018	Independiente	13	(0)
2015	→ Quilmes (loan)	0	(0)
2018–2019	Tigres UANL	0	(0)
2018–2019	→ Correcaminos UAT (loan)	34	(2)
2019–2020	Godoy Cruz	16	(0)
2020–2021	Defensa y Justicia	20	(0)
2021–2023	Godoy Cruz	47	(0)
2023–2024	→ Arsenal de Sarandí (loan)	32	(1)
2024–2025	Atlético Tucumán	19	(1)
2025–	Aldosivi	29	(0)
- * Club domestic league appearances and goals as of 17:50, 6 November 2026 (UTC)

Néstor Adriel Breitenbruch (born 13 September 1995) is an Argentine professional footballer who plays as a centre-back for Aldosivi.

== Career ==
Breitenbruch began his career with Argentine Primera División side Independiente. He made his senior debut in April 2014 during a Copa Argentina match with Santamarina, prior to making his professional debut in the league against Atlético de Rafaela on 10 August. Ten appearances followed over the course of 2014 and 2015. In July 2015, Breitenbruch was loaned to fellow Primera División team Quilmes. However, he returned to Independiente months later without featuring. In January 2018, Breitenbruch joined Liga MX side Tigres UANL. He was immediately loaned to Correcaminos UAT of Ascenso MX.

He scored his first senior goal in his third match for Correcaminos on 13 February versus Cafetaleros de Tapachula. On 28 June 2019, Breitenbruch agreed a move back to Argentina with Godoy Cruz.

== Career statistics ==
As of 11 July 2019.

Club statistics
Club	Season	League			Cup		League Cup		Continental		Other		Total	
Club	Season	Division	Apps	Goals	Apps	Goals	Apps	Goals	Apps	Goals	Apps	Goals	Apps	Goals
Independiente	2013–14	Primera B Nacional	0	0	1	0	—		—		0	0	1	0
Independiente	2014	Primera División	9	0	2	0	—		—		0	0	11	0
Independiente	2015	Primera División	2	0	1	0	—		0	0	0	0	3	0
Independiente	2016	Primera División	0	0	0	0	—		—		0	0	0	0
Independiente	2016–17	Primera División	0	0	1	0	—		0	0	0	0	1	0
Independiente	2017–18	Primera División	2	0	0	0	—		0	0	0	0	2	0
Independiente	Total		13	0	5	0	—		0	0	0	0	18	0
Quilmes (loan)	2015	Primera División	0	0	0	0	—		—		0	0	0	0
Tigres UANL	2017–18	Liga MX	0	0	0	0	—		0	0	0	0	0	0
Tigres UANL	2018–19	Liga MX	0	0	0	0	—		0	0	0	0	0	0
Tigres UANL	Total		0	0	0	0	—		0	0	0	0	0	0
Correcaminos UAT (loan)	2017–18	Ascenso MX	9	1	1	1	—		—		0	0	10	2
Correcaminos UAT (loan)	2018–19	Ascenso MX	25	1	0	0	—		—		0	0	25	1
Correcaminos UAT (loan)	Total		34	2	1	1	—		—		0	0	35	3
Godoy Cruz	2019–20	Primera División	0	0	0	0	0	0	0	0	0	0	0	0
Career total			47	2	6	1	0	0	0	0	0	0	53	3
