= Luis De Faría =

Argentinian association football player

Personal information
- Date of birth: 21 February 1996 (age 30)
- Place of birth: Mendoza, Argentina
- Height: 1.70 m (5 ft 7 in)
- Position: Midfielder

Team information
- Current team: Unión Alicia

Youth career
- 2002–2015: Godoy Cruz

Senior career*
Years	Team	Apps	(Gls)
2015–2018	Godoy Cruz	6	(0)
2016	→ Gimnasia y Esgrima (loan)	6	(0)
2020–	Unión Alicia		
- * Club domestic league appearances and goals as of 12:12, 5 October 2020 (UTC)

Luis De Faría (born 21 February 1996) is an Argentine professional footballer who plays as a midfielder for Unión Alicia.

== Career ==
De Faría's first club were Godoy Cruz, he started his youth career with them at the age of six prior to starting his senior career in 2015 with the club. His debut appearance came on 30 May in a 1–0 defeat to Unión Santa Fe, which was the first of five to come during the 2015 Primera División campaign. In February 2016, De Faría was loaned to Gimnasia y Esgrima of Torneo Federal A. He went on to feature six times, two of which were starts, for Gimnasia y Esgrima in 2016. De Faría left Godoy in December 2018 after his contract ended, going on to join Liga San Francisco team Unión Alicia in early 2020.

== Career statistics ==
As of 5 October 2020.

Club statistics
Club	Season	League			Cup		League Cup		Continental		Other		Total	
Club	Season	Division	Apps	Goals	Apps	Goals	Apps	Goals	Apps	Goals	Apps	Goals	Apps	Goals
Godoy Cruz	2015	Primera División	5	0	0	0	—		—		0	0	5	0
Godoy Cruz	2016	Primera División	0	0	0	0	—		—		0	0	0	0
Godoy Cruz	2016–17	Primera División	1	0	0	0	—		0	0	0	0	1	0
Godoy Cruz	2017–18	Primera División	0	0	0	0	—		0	0	0	0	0	0
Godoy Cruz	2018–19	Primera División	0	0	0	0	0	0	0	0	0	0	0	0
Godoy Cruz	Total		6	0	0	0	0	0	0	0	0	0	6	0
Gimnasia y Esgrima (loan)	2016	Torneo Federal A	6	0	0	0	—		—		0	0	6	0
Career total			12	0	0	0	0	0	0	0	0	0	12	0
