= Leandro Vella =

Argentine footballer

Personal information
- Date of birth: 9 November 1996 (age 30)
- Place of birth: San Martín, Argentina
- Height: 1.76 m (5 ft 9 1/2 in)
- Position: Winger

Team information
- Current team: Alvarado

Youth career
- Escuela Pablo Kratina
- 2008–2011: Huracán de Córdoba
- 2011–2016: Instituto

Senior career*
Years	Team	Apps	(Gls)
2016–2019	Instituto	42	(7)
2017–2018	→ Central Córdoba SdE (loan)	27	(8)
2019–2020	Godoy Cruz	14	(1)
2020	Central Córdoba SdE	7	(0)
2021	San Martín Tucumán	33	(1)
2022–	Alvarado	14	(2)
- * Club domestic league appearances and goals as of 18:52, 14 June 2022 (UTC)

Leandro Vella (born 9 November 1996) is an Argentine professional footballer who plays as a winger for Alvarado.

== Club career ==
Vella started his career with Escuela Pablo Kratina, which preceded a move to Huracán de Córdoba in 2008. In 2011, Instituto signed Vella. Having spent five years in the youth ranks of the Córdoba club, his professional bow came in a goalless draw with Gimnasia y Esgrima on 31 January 2016; which was followed by his opening goal two appearances later against Estudiantes. Further goals arrived versus Independiente Rivadavia, All Boys, Nueva Chicago and Almagro. After five goals in sixteen fixtures in 2016, Vella followed that up with a sole goal in the same number of matches across the 2016–17 campaign.

In August 2017, Vella joined Torneo Federal A side Central Córdoba on loan. Eleven goals, including a Copa Argentina hat-trick over San Lorenzo, followed as they won promotion to tier two. Primera División team Godoy Cruz announced the signing of Vella on 11 June 2019, ahead of the 2019–20 season. He scored one goal, versus Colón on 21 October, in fifteen total matches for them. On 16 July 2020, Vella sealed a return to Central Córdoba on a free transfer; with the club now in the Primera División.

After a spell at San Martín de Tucumán in 2021, Vella joined Primera Nacional side Alvarado ahead of the 2022 season.

== International career ==
At a young age, Vella was called up by the Argentina U15s.

== Personal life ==
In December 2018, Vella was involved in a serious one-person, single-vehicle crash. Despite the car ending on its roof without wheels, Vella escaped unharmed.

== Career statistics ==
As of 28 September 2020.

Club statistics
Club	Season	League			Cup		League Cup		Continental		Other		Total	
Club	Season	Division	Apps	Goals	Apps	Goals	Apps	Goals	Apps	Goals	Apps	Goals	Apps	Goals
Instituto	2016	Primera B Nacional	16	5	0	0	—		—		0	0	16	5
Instituto	2016–17	Primera B Nacional	16	1	1	0	—		—		0	0	17	1
Instituto	2017–18	Primera B Nacional	0	0	1	0	—		—		0	0	1	0
Instituto	2018–19	Primera B Nacional	10	1	0	0	—		—		0	0	10	1
Instituto	Total		42	7	2	0	—		—		0	0	44	7
Central Córdoba (loan)	2017–18	Torneo Federal A	27	8	1	3	—		—		0	0	28	11
Godoy Cruz	2019–20	Primera División	14	1	1	0	—		—		0	0	15	1
Central Córdoba	2020–21	Primera División	0	0	0	0	—		—		0	0	0	0
Career total			83	16	4	3	—		—		0	0	87	19
