= Ezequiel Bullaude =

Argentinian football player

Personal information
- Full name: Ezequiel Eduardo Bullaude
- Date of birth: 26 October 2000 (age 26)
- Place of birth: Maipú, Mendoza, Argentina
- Height: 1.84 m (6 ft 1/2 in)
- Positions: Attacking midfielder; forward

Team information
- Current team: Santos Laguna
- Number: 10

Youth career
- Maipú

Senior career*
Years	Team	Apps	(Gls)
2016–2018	Maipú	10	(0)
2018–2022	Godoy Cruz	58	(15)
2022–2025	Feyenoord	9	(0)
2023–2024	→ Boca Juniors (loan)	16	(1)
2024–2025	→ Fortuna Sittard (loan)	28	(6)
2025–2026	Tijuana	9	(2)
2026	→ Santos Laguna (loan)	32	(8)
2026–	Santos Laguna	0	(0)
- * Club domestic league appearances and goals as of 13 November 2026

Ezequiel Eduardo Bullaude (born 26 October 2000) is an Argentine professional footballer who plays an attacking midfielder or forward for Liga MX club Santos Laguna.

== Career ==
=== Club ===
Bullaude got his senior career underway with Godoy Cruz in 2018, having previously played for their youth teams; in which time he had trials with Argentinos Juniors and Lanús. He was selected for his professional debut by manager Diego Dabove on 20 October, with the forward being substituted on for the final minutes of a 2–0 Argentine Primera División victory over Aldosivi at the Estadio Malvinas Argentinas.

On 30 August 2022, Bullaude signed a five-year contract with Feyenoord in the Netherlands. He made his debut for the club on 11 September 2022, coming on as a substitute during Feyenoord's 3–0 win over Sparta Rotterdam. He scored his first goal for the club on 9 March 2023, scoring the equalizer in a 1–1 draw away against Shakhtar Donetsk in the round of 16 of the Europa League.

On 14 August 2023, Bullaude moved on a year-long loan to Boca Juniors.

On 2 September 2024, Bullaude was loaned by Fortuna Sittard.

=== International ===
In February 2018, Bullaude was selected by Pablo Aimar to train with the Argentina U19s.

== Personal life ==
Bullaude's cousin, Matías Sandes, is a professional basketball player.

== Career statistics ==
As of 26 November 2023.

Club statistics
Club	Division	League			Cup		Continental		Total	
Club	Division	Season	Apps	Goals	Apps	Goals	Apps	Goals	Apps	Goals
Godoy Cruz	Primera División	2018-19	6	0	5	0	5	0	16	0
Godoy Cruz	Primera División	2019-20	3	0	—		2	0	5	0
Godoy Cruz	Primera División	2020	—		7	0	—		7	0
Godoy Cruz	Primera División	2021	24	7	14	5	—		38	12
Godoy Cruz	Primera División	2022	14	0	16	6	—		30	6
Godoy Cruz	Total		47	7	42	11	7	0	96	18
Feyenoord	Eredivisie	2022-23	9	0	2	0	4	1	15	1
Boca Juniors	Primera División	2023	—		14	1	—		14	1
Boca Juniors	Primera División	2024	—		5	0	1	0	6	0
Boca Juniors	Total		0	0	19	1	1	0	20	1
Fortuna Sittard	Eredivisie	2024-25	5	2	0	0	0	0	5	2
Career total			61	9	63	12	12	1	136	22

== Honours ==
Feyenoord

- Eredivisie: 2022–23
