= Gianluca Ferrari =

Argentine footballer

Personal information
- Date of birth: 30 June 1997 (age 29)
- Place of birth: Rosario, Argentina
- Height: 1.81 m (5 ft 11 in)
- Position: Centre-back

Team information
- Current team: Atlético Tucumán
- Number: 6

Youth career
- –2015: Scandicci
- 2014–2015: → Latina (loan)

Senior career*
Years	Team	Apps	(Gls)
2016–2017	Montecatini	23	(1)
2017–2021	San Lorenzo	15	(1)
2020–2021	→ Godoy Cruz (loan)	15	(0)
2021–2025	Godoy Cruz	61	(2)
2024	→ Atlético Tucumán (loan)	21	(2)
2025–	Atlético Tucumán	30	(0)
- * Club domestic league appearances and goals as of 17:30, 9 November 2026 (UTC)

Gianluca Ferrari (born 30 June 1997) is an Argentine professional footballer who plays as a centre-back for Argentine Primera División club Atlético Tucumán.

== Career ==
Ferrari's career got underway in Italy, with the defender featuring for Scandicci's youth teams; in which time he was loaned out to Latina's ranks. In 2016, Ferrari completed a move to Serie D's Montecatini. He scored one goal in twenty-three appearances in 2016–17 as the club finished tenth. Ferrari had to return to Argentina in 2017 following bureaucratic issues. In August 2017, Ferrari joined San Lorenzo of the Argentine Primera División. His professional football debut arrived on 7 October in the league against Banfield.

In January 2020, Ferrari was loaned to Godoy Cruz for 18 months without a purchase option. On 10 February 2021, Ferrari became a part of a swap-deal between San Lorenzo and Godoy Cruz, with Jalil Elías moving to San Lorenzo, in exchange for 70% of Ferrari's pass.

== Personal life ==
He is the brother of fellow footballer Franco Ferrari.

== Career statistics ==
As of 9 January 2020

Appearances and goals by club, season and competition
Club	Season	League			Cup (Note: Includes Coppa Italia and Copa Argentina.)		League Cup		Continental (Note: Includes Copa Libertadores and Copa Sudamericana.)		Other		Total	
Club	Season	Division	Apps	Goals	Apps	Goals	Apps	Goals	Apps	Goals	Apps	Goals	Apps	Goals
Montecatini	2016–17	Serie D	23	1	0	0	—		—		0	0	23	1
San Lorenzo	2017–18	Argentine Primera División	0	0	0	0	—		0	0	0	0	0	0
San Lorenzo	2018–19	Argentine Primera División	9	1	0	0	—		0	0	0	0	9	1
San Lorenzo	2019–20	Argentine Primera División	6	0	1	0	—		0	0	0	0	7	0
San Lorenzo	Total		15	1	1	0	0	0	0	0	0	0	16	1
Godoy Cruz	2019–20	Argentine Primera División	0	0	0	0	—		0	0	0	0	0	0
Career total			33	2	0	0	0	0	0	0	0	0	33	2
