= Roberto Ramírez (footballer) =

Argentinian association football player

Personal information
- Full name: Roberto Fabián Ramírez
- Date of birth: 7 July 1996 (age 30)
- Place of birth: Mendoza, Argentina
- Height: 1.82 m (5 ft 11 1/2 in)
- Position: Goalkeeper

Team information
- Current team: Godoy Cruz

Youth career
- 2009–2014: Godoy Cruz

Senior career*
Years	Team	Apps	(Gls)
2014–	Godoy Cruz	48	(0)
2022	→ Quilmes (loan)	1	(0)
2023	→ Guillermo Brown (loan)	35	(0)
2025	→ All Boys (loan)	12	(0)
- * Club domestic league appearances and goals as of 18:45, 18 March 2026 (UTC)

Roberto Fabián Ramírez (born 7 July 1996) is an Argentine professional footballer who plays as a goalkeeper for Godoy Cruz.

== Career ==
Ramírez joined Argentine Primera División side Godoy Cruz in 2009. He first appeared on a first-team teamsheet in 2013–14 as he went unused in games against Newell's Old Boys and Racing Club. After two further substitute bench appearances in 2015, Ramírez made his professional debut in 2016–17 in a 1–0 victory over Huracán on 26 August 2017. In June 2022, Ramírez joined Primera Nacional side Quilmes on loan for the rest of the year.

== Career statistics ==
As of 24 May 2018.

Club statistics
Club	Season	League			Cup (Note: Includes the Copa Argentina)		League Cup		Continental (Note: Includes the Copa Libertadores and Copa Sudamericana)		Other		Total	
Club	Season	Division	Apps	Goals	Apps	Goals	Apps	Goals	Apps	Goals	Apps	Goals	Apps	Goals
Godoy Cruz	2013–14	Primera División	0	0	0	0	—		—		0	0	0	0
Godoy Cruz	2014	Primera División	0	0	0	0	—		0	0	0	0	0	0
Godoy Cruz	2015	Primera División	0	0	0	0	—		—		0	0	0	0
Godoy Cruz	2016	Primera División	0	0	0	0	—		—		0	0	0	0
Godoy Cruz	2016–17	Primera División	2	0	0	0	—		0	0	0	0	2	0
Godoy Cruz	2017–18	Primera División	1	0	0	0	—		—		0	0	1	0
Career total			3	0	0	0	—		0	0	0	0	3	0
