= Fabián Henríquez =

Argentinian association football player

Personal information
- Full name: Fabián Gastón Henríquez
- Date of birth: 8 June 1995 (age 31)
- Place of birth: Mendoza, Argentina
- Height: 1.85 m (6 ft 1 in)
- Position: Midfielder

Team information
- Current team: San Telmo

Youth career
- 2007–2009: Rosario Central
- 2010: All Boys
- 2011–2015: Godoy Cruz

Senior career*
Years	Team	Apps	(Gls)
2015–2021	Godoy Cruz	66	(2)
2021–2023	Huracán	20	(1)
2023–2025	Colón	15	(0)
2025–2026	Agropecuario	16	(0)
2026–	San Telmo	8	(0)
- * Club domestic league appearances and goals as of 16:54, 6 May 2026 (UTC)

Fabián Gastón Henríquez (born 8 June 1995) is an Argentine professional footballer who plays as a midfielder for San Telmo.

== Career ==
Henríquez had youth spells with Rosario Central, All Boys and Godoy Cruz. He started his senior career with Godoy Cruz in 2011. On 25 September 2015, Henríquez made his professional debut in a loss at the Estadio Roberto Natalio Carminatti against Olimpo. That was his only appearance in 2015, prior to twenty-seven games in all competitions over the course of 2016 and 2016–17. During that period, Henríquez scored his first senior goal (vs. Estudiantes, Copa Argentina) on 19 July 2016 and was sent off for the first time (vs. Racing Club, Argentine Primera División) on 25 March 2017.

On 2 July 2021, Henríquez joined Huracán on a deal until the end of 2022. He left the club at the end of 2022 and was without club until September 2023, where he signed with Colón until the end of 2024.

== Career statistics ==
As of 10 May 2018.

Club statistics
Club	Season	League			Cup (Note: Includes the Copa Argentina)		League Cup		Continental (Note: Includes the Copa Libertadores)		Other		Total	
Club	Season	Division	Apps	Goals	Apps	Goals	Apps	Goals	Apps	Goals	Apps	Goals	Apps	Goals
Godoy Cruz	2015	Primera División	1	0	0	0	—		—		0	0	1	0
Godoy Cruz	2016	Primera División	2	0	0	0	—		—		0	0	2	0
Godoy Cruz	2016–17	Primera División	17	0	4	1	—		4 (Note: Four appearances in 2017 Copa Libertadores)	0	0	0	25	1
Godoy Cruz	2017–18	Primera División	11	0	2	0	—		2 (Note: Two appearances in 2017 Copa Libertadores)	0	0	0	15	0
Career total			31	0	6	1	—		6	0	0	0	43	1
