= Nahuel Arena =

Argentine professional footballer

Personal information
- Full name: Nahuel Eloy Arena
- Date of birth: 2 June 1998 (age 28)
- Place of birth: Buenos Aires, Argentina
- Height: 1.83 m (6 ft 0 in)
- Position: Defender

Team information
- Current team: Cerro
- Number: 21

Senior career*
Years	Team	Apps	(Gls)
2018–2019	Vélez Sarsfield	1	(0)
2019–2021	Godoy Cruz	15	(1)
2021–2022	Estudiantes	28	(0)
2022–2025	Ferro Carril Oeste	83	(6)
2025–2026	Macará	36	(3)
2026	→ Independiente Rivadavia (loan)	0	(0)
2026–	Cerro	11	(1)
- * Club domestic league appearances and goals as of 17:19, 4 October 2026 (UTC)

Nahuel Eloy Arena (born 2 June 1998) is an Argentine professional footballer who plays as a defender for Uruguayan club Cerro.

Arena made his debut for Vélez Sarsfield in the Argentine Primera División on August 10, 2018, against Newell's Old Boys.

== Career statistics ==
As of 17 May 2025

Club	Division	Season	League		Cup		Continental		Total	
Club	Division	Season	Apps	Goals	Apps	Goals	Apps	Goals	Apps	Goals
Vélez Sarsfield	Primera División	2018-19	1	0	1	0	—		2	0
Godoy Cruz	Primera División	2018-19	8	0	2	0	—		10	0
Godoy Cruz	Primera División	2019-20	7	1	0	0	2	0	9	1
Godoy Cruz	Total		15	1	2	0	2	0	21	1
Estudiantes	Primera B Nacional	2020	4	0	0	0	—		4	0
Estudiantes	Primera B Nacional	2021	24	0	0	0	—		24	0
Estudiantes	Total		28	0	0	0	0	0	28	0
Ferro Carril Oeste	Primera B Nacional	2022	31	1	2	0	—		33	1
Ferro Carril Oeste	Primera B Nacional	2023	30	4	—		—		30	4
Ferro Carril Oeste	Primera B Nacional	2024	22	1	—		—		22	1
Ferro Carril Oeste	Total		83	6	2	0	0	0	85	6
C.S.D. Macará	Serie A	2025	36	3	0	0	—		36	3
Total			141	9	5	0	2	0	170	9
