= Gabriel Alanís =

Argentine footballer

Personal information
- Full name: Gabriel Gustavo Alanís
- Date of birth: 16 March 1994 (age 32)
- Place of birth: Córdoba, Argentina
- Height: 1.86 m (6 ft 1 in)
- Position: Left midfielder

Team information
- Current team: Estudiantes RC (on loan from Huracán)
- Number: 17

Youth career
- 2003–2014: Belgrano

Senior career*
Years	Team	Apps	(Gls)
2014–2019	Belgrano	36	(0)
2018	→ Arsenal Sarandí (loan)	14	(1)
2019–2021	Godoy Cruz	15	(0)
2021–2022	Sarmiento	38	(5)
2022–2025	Defensa y Justicia	97	(9)
2025–	Huracán	22	(0)
2026–	→ Estudiantes RC (loan)	28	(4)
- * Club domestic league appearances and goals as of 17:40, 8 November 2026 (UTC)

Gabriel Gustavo Alanís (born 16 March 1994) is an Argentine professional footballer who plays as a left midfielder for Estudiantes RC, on loan from Huracán.

== Career ==
After being in the youth ranks for eleven years, Alanís made his debut for Argentine Primera División side Belgrano in October 2014 against Banfield; coming on late in a 2–2 draw. In his first three seasons with the club, Alanís made sixteen appearances in all competitions. After ten further appearances in his fourth season, 2016–17, he failed to play during 2017–18. On 16 January 2018, Alanís joined Arsenal de Sarandí on loan. He scored his first career goal for Arsenal against Patronato in April 2018.

Alanís agreed to sign for Godoy Cruz on 11 June, following the relegation of Belgrano to Primera B Nacional. In 2021, he was out on loan at Sarmiento and in January 2022, he was once again sent out on loan, this time to Defensa y Justicia until the end of 2022 with a purchase option.

== Career statistics ==
As of 15 June 2019.

Club statistics
Club	Season	League			Cup		League Cup		Continental		Other		Total	
Club	Season	Division	Apps	Goals	Apps	Goals	Apps	Goals	Apps	Goals	Apps	Goals	Apps	Goals
Belgrano	2014	Primera División	3	0	0	0	—		—		0	0	3	0
Belgrano	2015	Primera División	6	0	1	0	—		0	0	0	0	7	0
Belgrano	2016	Primera División	6	0	0	0	—		—		0	0	6	0
Belgrano	2016–17	Primera División	10	0	3	0	—		2 (Note: Appearance(s) in the Copa Sudamericana)	0	0	0	15	0
Belgrano	2017–18	Primera División	0	0	0	0	—		0	0	0	0	0	0
Belgrano	2018–19	Primera División	11	0	1	0	—		0	0	0	0	12	0
Belgrano	Total		36	0	5	0	—		2	0	0	0	43	0
Arsenal de Sarandí (loan)	2017–18	Primera División	14	1	0	0	—		—		0	0	14	1
Career total			50	1	5	0	—		2	0	0	0	57	1
