= Richard Prieto =

Paraguayan footballer (born 1997)

Personal information
- Full name: Richard Fabián Prieto Franco
- Date of birth: 25 January 1997 (age 29)
- Place of birth: San Joaquín, Paraguay
- Height: 1.79 m (5 ft 10 in)
- Position: Midfielder

Team information
- Current team: Nacional
- Number: 27

Youth career
- General Díaz

Senior career*
Years	Team	Apps	(Gls)
2014–2021	General Díaz	117	(8)
2019–2020	→ Godoy Cruz (loan)	5	(1)
2021–2023	Nacional	34	(4)
2023–2024	Guaraní	58	(2)
2025–	Nacional	22	(4)

International career
2017	Paraguay U23	1	(0)
2016–2017	Paraguay U20	4	(0)
- * Club domestic league appearances and goals as of 13 August 2025

Richard Fabián Prieto Franco (born 25 January 1997) is a Paraguayan professional footballer who plays as a midfielder for Nacional.

== Career ==
=== Club ===
Prieto's first club was General Díaz. He made his professional debut at the age of seventeen, featuring for thirty-two minutes of a 2–1 win over Rubio Ñu in the Paraguayan Primera División on 5 September 2014. Over the course of his opening five seasons, Prieto made one hundred and seven appearances in all competitions for the club whilst netting eight times; with his first goal coming in January 2016 against Sportivo Luqueño. Two years later, having played twice in the 2019 campaign, Prieto completed a loan move to Godoy Cruz of the Argentine Primera División.

=== International ===
Prieto represented Paraguay at U20 and U23. He initially appeared for the latter at the 2016 Toulon Tournament in France, prior to being selected for 2017 South American U-20 Championship; three caps came.

== Career statistics ==
As of 3 February 2019.

Club statistics
Club	Season	League			Cup		Continental		Other		Total	
Club	Season	Division	Apps	Goals	Apps	Goals	Apps	Goals	Apps	Goals	Apps	Goals
General Díaz	2014	Paraguayan Primera División	1	0	—		0	0	0	0	1	0
General Díaz	2015	Paraguayan Primera División	26	0	—		—		0	0	26	0
General Díaz	2016	Paraguayan Primera División	31	3	—		—		0	0	31	3
General Díaz	2017	Paraguayan Primera División	28	2	—		—		0	0	28	2
General Díaz	2018	Paraguayan Primera División	20	3	0	0	1 (Note: Appearance(s) in the Copa Sudamericana)	0	0	0	21	3
General Díaz	2019	Paraguayan Primera División	2	0	0	0	—		0	0	2	0
General Díaz	Total		108	8	0	0	1	0	0	0	109	8
Godoy Cruz (loan)	2018–19	Argentine Primera División	0	0	0	0	0	0	0	0	0	0
Career total			108	8	0	0	1	0	0	0	109	8
