= Victorio Ramis =

Argentine footballer (born 1994)

Personal information
- Full name: Victorio Gabriel Ramis
- Date of birth: 7 July 1994 (age 32)
- Place of birth: Córdoba, Argentina
- Height: 1.81 m (5 ft 11 1/2 in)
- Position: Forward

Team information
- Current team: Independiente Rivadavia
- Number: 7

Youth career
- 2002–2014: Talleres

Senior career*
| Years | Team | Apps | (Gls) |
| 2014–2017 | Talleres | 61 | (13) |
| 2017–2021 | Godoy Cruz | 37 | (4) |
| 2019–2020 | → Argentinos Juniors (loan) | 5 | (0) |
| 2021–2022 | Ferro Carril Oeste | 15 | (1) |
| 2022–2023 | Alvarado | 25 | (0) |
| 2023– | Independiente Rivadavia | 70 | (8) |
- * Club domestic league appearances and goals as of 16:35, 11 July 2026 (UTC)

Victorio Gabriel Ramis (born 7 July 1994) is an Argentine professional footballer who plays as a forward for Independiente Rivadavia in the Argentine Primera División.

== Career ==
Ramis' senior career began in 2014 with Talleres, who he joined in 2002. After being an unused sub for a Copa Argentina game with Chaco For Ever on 12 March, he made his professional debut in a goalless draw with Huracán on 26 May. One more appearance came in 2013–14, which was a season that ended in relegation to Torneo Federal A for Talleres. In Torneo Federal A, Ramis scored his first goal during a win over Defensores de Belgrano in November 2014. Six goals in twenty-one games occurred in two seasons in tier three. In their first season back in Primera B Nacional, Talleres won promotion to the Argentine Primera División.

After one season and twenty appearances with five goals in the Primera División, Ramis joined fellow top-flight team Godoy Cruz on 2 August 2017. His first appearance for Godoy Cruz arrived on 27 August versus Atlético Tucumán.

== Career statistics ==
As of 28 May 2018.

Club statistics
| Club | Season | League | | | Cup (Note: Includes the Copa Argentina) | | League Cup | | Continental (Note: Includes the Copa Libertadores) | | Other (Note: Includes the Torneo Federal A play-offs) | | Total | |
| Club | Season | Division | Apps | Goals | Apps | Goals | Apps | Goals | Apps | Goals | Apps | Goals | Apps | Goals |
|---|---|---|---|---|---|---|---|---|---|---|---|---|---|---|
| Talleres | 2013–14 | Primera B Nacional | 2 | 0 | 0 | 0 | — | | — | | 0 | 0 | 2 | 0 |
| Talleres | 2014 | Torneo Federal A | 7 | 1 | 0 | 0 | — | | — | | 3 (Note: Three appearances in 2014 Torneo Federal A play-offs) | 2 (Note: Two goals in 2014 Torneo Federal A play-offs) | 10 | 3 |
| Talleres | 2015 | Torneo Federal A | 11 | 3 | 0 | 0 | — | | — | | 0 | 0 | 11 | 3 |
| Talleres | 2016 | Primera B Nacional | 21 | 4 | 1 | 0 | — | | — | | 0 | 0 | 22 | 4 |
| Talleres | 2016–17 | Primera División | 20 | 5 | 1 | 0 | — | | — | | 0 | 0 | 21 | 5 |
| Talleres | Total | | 61 | 13 | 2 | 0 | — | | — | | 3 | 2 | 66 | 15 |
| Godoy Cruz | 2017–18 | Primera División | 23 | 3 | 1 | 1 | — | | 0 | 0 | 0 | 0 | 24 | 4 |
| Career total | | | 84 | 16 | 3 | 1 | — | | 0 | 0 | 3 | 2 | 90 | 19 |

== Honours ==
Talleres

- Torneo Federal A: 2015
- Primera B Nacional: 2016

Independiente Rivadavia

- Primera Nacional: 2023
- Copa Argentina: 2025
