= Valentín Burgoa =

Argentine association football player

Personal information
- Full name: Valentín Alberto Burgoa
- Date of birth: 16 August 2000 (age 26)
- Place of birth: Guaymallén, Argentina
- Height: 1.74 m (5 ft 8 1/2 in)
- Position: Midfielder

Team information
- Current team: Orense (on loan from Godoy Cruz)
- Number: 10

Youth career
- Godoy Cruz

Senior career*
Years	Team	Apps	(Gls)
2018–	Godoy Cruz	93	(2)
2023	→ Huracán (loan)	11	(0)
2024–2025	→ Sarmiento (loan)	35	(1)
2025–	→ Orense (loan)	5	(1)
- * Club domestic league appearances and goals as of 17:00, 15 July 2025 (UTC)

Valentín Alberto Burgoa (born 16 August 2000) is an Argentine professional footballer who plays as a midfielder for Orense, on loan from Godoy Cruz.

== Career ==
Burgoa began his career with Godoy Cruz. He was promoted into their senior squad towards the end of the 2017–18 Argentine Primera División season, appearing on the bench in April 2018 versus Banfield prior to making his professional debut at the age of eighteen in a 2–0 win over Tigre on the final day as Godoy Cruz finished second.

== Career statistics ==
As of 30 September 2018.

Club statistics
Club	Season	League			Cup (Note: Includes the Copa Argentina)		League Cup		Continental (Note: Includes the Copa Libertadores)		Other		Total	
Club	Season	Division	Apps	Goals	Apps	Goals	Apps	Goals	Apps	Goals	Apps	Goals	Apps	Goals
Godoy Cruz	2017–18	Primera División	1	0	0	0	—		0	0	0	0	1	0
Godoy Cruz	2018–19	Primera División	2	0	0	0	—		0	0	0	0	2	0
Career total			3	0	0	0	—		0	0	0	0	3	0
