= Luciano Pizarro =

Argentinian association football player

Personal information
- Full name: Luciano Gastón Pizarro
- Date of birth: 14 July 1997 (age 29)
- Place of birth: Godoy Cruz, Argentina
- Height: 1.86 m (6 ft 1 in)
- Position: Midfielder

Team information
- Current team: Güemes
- Number: 8

Youth career
- 2005–2017: Godoy Cruz

Senior career*
Years	Team	Apps	(Gls)
2017–	Godoy Cruz	19	(0)
2023	→ Agropecuario (loan)	0	(0)
2024–	→ Güemes (loan)	9	(0)
- * Club domestic league appearances and goals as of 27 July 2024

Luciano Gastón Pizarro (born 14 July 1997) is an Argentine professional footballer who plays as a midfielder for Güemes on loan from Godoy Cruz.

== Career ==
Pizarro joined Godoy Cruz as a youngster in 2005. He was promoted into the club's senior squad in April 2017. His debut arrived on 8 April during a defeat to Colón, which was one of four appearances in April including his first in continental competition as he played the final eighteen minutes in a Copa Libertadores win over Sport Boys of Bolivia on 20 April. In the following June, Pizarro scored his first professional goal during a 3–0 victory in the Copa Argentina over Santamarina. Just two more appearances arrived in the following three years, mostly due to a number of serious injuries.

== Personal life ==
In July 2019, Pizarro was detained and charged with aggravated manslaughter after he was involved in a traffic incident which ended the life of a seventeen-year-old girl named Luna Celeste Cangemi. He failed a breathalyzer test, though details became muddled when it was claimed Pizarro wasn't the driver, instead his girlfriend was, and the motorcycle, which was carrying three people, was speeding and the occupants weren't wearing helmets. He remained in custody for three days, before paying a bond to be released on bail; paid after a relative put a house up to cover the $1,000,000 pesos.

== Career statistics ==
As of 4 October 2020.

Club statistics
Club	Season	League			Cup		League Cup		Continental		Other		Total	
Club	Season	Division	Apps	Goals	Apps	Goals	Apps	Goals	Apps	Goals	Apps	Goals	Apps	Goals
Godoy Cruz	2016–17	Primera División	5	0	1	1	—		1 (Note: Appearance(s) in the Copa Libertadores)	0	0	0	7	1
Godoy Cruz	2017–18	Primera División	1	0	0	0	—		0	0	0	0	1	0
Godoy Cruz	2018–19	Primera División	0	0	0	0	—		0	0	0	0	0	0
Godoy Cruz	2019–20	Primera División	1	0	1	0	—		0	0	0	0	2	0
Career total			7	0	2	1	—		1	0	0	0	10	1
