= Maximiliano Correa =

Argentine footballer

Personal information
- Full name: Roberto Maximiliano Correa Tolosa
- Date of birth: 22 November 1989 (age 36)
- Place of birth: Argentina
- Height: 1.69 m (5 ft 7 in)
- Position: Midfielder

Team information
- Current team: Instituto de Córdoba (on loan from Godoy Cruz)

Youth career
- Instituto de Córdoba

Senior career*
Years	Team	Apps	(Gls)
2010–2016	Instituto de Córdoba	113	(1)
2016–	Godoy Cruz	16	(0)
2017–2018	→ Instituto de Córdoba	16	(0)
- * Club domestic league appearances and goals as of 21 December 2017

Roberto Maximiliano Correa Tolosa (born 22 November 1989) is an Argentine footballer who plays for Instituto de Córdoba on loan from Godoy Cruz Antonio Tomba as a midfielder.
