= Agustín Álvarez (footballer, born 2000) =

Argentine professional footballer

Personal information
- Full name: Tomás Agustín Álvarez
- Date of birth: 8 January 2000 (age 26)
- Place of birth: San Luis, Argentina
- Height: 1.75 m (5 ft 9 in)
- Position: Midfielder

Team information
- Current team: Juan Aurich

Youth career
- Racing Club
- 2017–2019: Godoy Cruz

Senior career*
Years	Team	Apps	(Gls)
2019–2021	Godoy Cruz	6	(0)
2022–	Juan Aurich	0	(0)
- * Club domestic league appearances and goals as of 22:04, 9 April 2022 (UTC)

Tomás Agustín Álvarez (born 8 January 2000) is an Argentine professional footballer who plays as a midfielder for Juan Aurich.

== Career ==
Álvarez is a product of the Godoy Cruz youth system, having joined from the Racing Club equivalent in 2017. Lucas Bernardi promoted the defender into senior action in mid-2019, selecting him to start a Copa Argentina encounter with Huracán on 14 July; he appeared for the full duration as Godoy Cruz progressed on penalties.

In February 2022, Álvarez joined Peruvian club Juan Aurich.

== Career statistics ==
As of 23 June 2020.

Appearances and goals by club, season and competition
Club	Season	League			Cup		League Cup		Continental		Other		Total	
Club	Season	Division	Apps	Goals	Apps	Goals	Apps	Goals	Apps	Goals	Apps	Goals	Apps	Goals
Godoy Cruz	2019–20	Primera División	2	0	1	0	0	0	0	0	0	0	3	0
Career total			2	0	1	0	0	0	0	0	0	0	3	0
