= Maximiliano Sigales =

Uruguayan footballer (born 1993)

Personal information
- Full name: Maximiliano Sigales Straneo
- Date of birth: 30 September 1993 (age 33)
- Place of birth: San Carlos, Uruguay
- Height: 1.85 m (6 ft 1 in)
- Position: Forward

Youth career
- Atenas

Senior career*
Years	Team	Apps	(Gls)
2013–2016	Atenas	52	(12)
2016–2017	Godoy Cruz	7	(1)
2017–2018	Boston River	22	(1)
2018–2019	Atenas	13	(0)
2020–2021	Correcaminos UAT	16	(3)
- * Club domestic league appearances and goals

Maximiliano Sigales Straneo (Note: In this Spanish name, the first or paternal surname is Sigales and the second or maternal family name is Straneo.) (born 30 September 1993) is a Uruguayan former professional footballer who played as a forward.

== Career ==
Born in Maldonado, Sigales began playing professional football with local Uruguayan second division club Atenas. The forward appeared in 67 league matches, scoring 15 goals, for Atenas until leaving in 2016.

On 27 June 2016, Argentine first division side Godoy Cruz de Mendoza signed Sigales to a three-year contract. He became the second Uruguayan player in the team joining compatriot Santiago "Morro" García. Sigales scored the only goal as Godoy Cruz defeated Huracán in the first match of the 2016–17 Argentine Primera División season. However, after Godoy Cruz suffered a 0–1 home defeat in the 2017 Copa Libertadores round of 16, the club fired manager Lucas Bernardi. In the aftermath, Sigales was one of several players to leave the club, joining Uruguayan side Boston River on a one-year loan.

On 10 January 2020, Sigales moved to Mexican club Correcaminos UAT.

== Honours ==
- Atenas 2013–2014 (Uruguayan Segunda División Championship)
