= Facundo Gutiérrez =

Argentine footballer

Personal information
- Full name: Kevin Facundo Gutiérrez
- Date of birth: 3 June 1997 (age 29)
- Place of birth: Lanús, Argentina
- Height: 1.75 m (5 ft 9 in)
- Position: Midfielder

Team information
- Current team: Argentinos Juniors
- Number: 15

Youth career
- 2018: Racing

Senior career*
| Years | Team | Apps | (Gls) |
| 2018–2023 | Racing | 11 | (0) |
| 2018–2019 | → Gimnasia (loan) | 1 | (0) |
| 2019 | → Godoy Cruz (loan) | 30 | (0) |
| 2020 | → Rosario Central (loan) | 1 | (0) |
| 2020–2021 | → Gimnasia (M) (loan) | 1 | (0) |
| 2021–2022 | → Def. y Justicia (loan) | 65 | (3) |
| 2023–2026 | Def. y Justicia | 77 | (1) |
| 2026 | Necaxa | 15 | (0) |
| 2026– | Argentinos Juniors | 1 | (0) |
- * Club domestic league appearances and goals as of 17:09, 25 July 2026 (UTC)

Kevin Facundo Gutiérrez (born 3 June 1997) is an Argentine professional footballer who plays as a midfielder for Argentinos Juniors.

== Club career ==
Gutiérrez joined Racing's youth academy in 2004. Thirteen years later, he made his professional debut with Racing Club in December 2017, having been moved into the first-team early in the month. His debut arrived on 2 December in a 2–2 draw with Newell's Old Boys. Gutiérrez was loaned to Gimnasia y Esgrima in August 2018. After just one appearance, which came in the Copa Argentina final defeat to Rosario Central, he terminated his loan with the club on 22 January 2019, subsequently leaving Racing Club on loan again days later to Godoy Cruz. Thirty total appearances followed.

January 2020 saw Rosario Central complete the loan signing of Gutiérrez. He wouldn't appear in the league for Rosario, but did feature in a Copa de la Superliga defeat to Colón on 16 March.

== International career ==
In September 2019, Gutiérrez received a call-up to Fernando Batista's Argentina U23s for a friendly with Bolivia.

== Career statistics ==
As of 19 July 2020.

Club statistics
| Club | Season | League | | | Cup | | League Cup | | Continental | | Other | | Total | |
| Club | Season | Division | Apps | Goals | Apps | Goals | Apps | Goals | Apps | Goals | Apps | Goals | Apps | Goals |
|---|---|---|---|---|---|---|---|---|---|---|---|---|---|---|
| Racing | 2017–18 | Primera División | 2 | 0 | 0 | 0 | — | | 0 | 0 | 0 | 0 | 2 | 0 |
| Racing | 2018–19 | Primera División | 0 | 0 | 0 | 0 | 0 | 0 | 0 | 0 | 0 | 0 | 0 | 0 |
| Racing | 2019–20 | Primera División | 0 | 0 | 0 | 0 | 0 | 0 | 0 | 0 | 0 | 0 | 0 | 0 |
| Racing | Total | | 2 | 0 | 0 | 0 | 0 | 0 | 0 | 0 | 0 | 0 | 2 | 0 |
| Gimnasia (loan) | 2018–19 | Primera División | 0 | 0 | 1 | 0 | 0 | 0 | — | | 0 | 0 | 1 | 0 |
| Godoy Cruz (loan) | 2018–19 | Primera División | 5 | 0 | 0 | 0 | 2 | 0 | 4 (Note: Appearance(s) in the Copa Libertadores) | 0 | 0 | 0 | 11 | 0 |
| Godoy Cruz (loan) | 2019–20 | Primera División | 15 | 0 | 2 | 0 | 0 | 0 | 2 | 0 | 0 | 0 | 19 | 0 |
| Godoy Cruz (loan) | Total | | 20 | 0 | 2 | 0 | 2 | 0 | 6 | 0 | 0 | 0 | 30 | 0 |
| Rosario Central (loan) | 2019–20 | Primera División | 0 | 0 | 0 | 0 | 1 | 0 | — | | 0 | 0 | 1 | 0 |
| Career total | | | 22 | 0 | 3 | 0 | 3 | 0 | 6 | 0 | 0 | 0 | 34 | 0 |
