= Agustín Romualdo Álvarez Rodríguez =

Spanish bishop

Agustín Romualdo Álvarez Rodríguez, OFMCap
- Titular bishop of Nasbinca
- Church: Roman Catholic Church
- See: Titular See of Nasbinca
- In office: 1986–2011
- Predecessor: Abramo Freschi
- Successor: none
- Previous post: Priest

Orders
- Ordination: March 12, 1949

Personal details
- Born: February 11, 1923 Renedo de Valdetuéjar, Spain
- Died: August 11, 2011 (aged 88)

Agustín Romualdo Álvarez Rodríguez OFMCap (February 11, 1923 – August 11, 2011) was a Spanish bishop of the Catholic Church.

== Life ==
Agustín Romualdo Álvarez Rodríguez was born in Renedo de Valdetuéjar, Spain, and was ordained a priest on March 12, 1949, from the Order of Friars Minor Capuchin. He was appointed vicar apostolic of the Vicariate Apostolic of Machiques on March 10, 1986, as well as titular bishop of Nasbinca and ordained bishop June 7, 1986. He resigned as vicar apostolic of Machiques October 7, 1995.

== See also ==
- Order of Friars Minor Capuchin
- Vicariate Apostolic
