= Iván Smith (Argentine footballer) =

Argentine footballer

Personal information
- Date of birth: 23 November 1999 (age 26)
- Place of birth: Villa España, Argentina
- Position: Midfielder

Team information
- Current team: Estudiantes BA (on loan from Godoy Cruz)

Youth career
- Quilmes

Senior career*
Years	Team	Apps	(Gls)
2017–2019	Quilmes	0	(0)
2019–	Godoy Cruz	2	(0)
2021	→ Cobresal (loan)	14	(0)
2022–	→ Estudiantes BA (loan)	11	(0)
- * Club domestic league appearances and goals as of 17:31, 17 July 2022 (UTC)

Iván Smith (born 23 November 1999) is an Argentine professional footballer who plays as a midfielder for Estudiantes de Buenos Aires, on loan from Godoy Cruz.

== Club career ==
Smith's first club was Quilmes. His opening experience of first-team football arrived in December 2017, with the midfielder appearing as a substitute for a Primera B Nacional loss to Instituto on 2 December; though he wasn't chosen by manager Leonardo Lemos. On 21 January 2019, Smith was signed by Primera División side Godoy Cruz for £103k; signing a four-year contract. Seven days after sitting on the bench for a Copa Argentina encounter with Deportivo Armenio, Smith made his professional debut in a league win over Patronato on 30 March.

== International career ==
In 2018, Smith trained with the Argentina U20s; notably against the seniors at the FIFA World Cup in Russia.

== Career statistics ==
As of 31 March 2019.

Appearances and goals by club, season and competition
Club	Season	League			Cup		Continental		Other		Total	
Club	Season	Division	Apps	Goals	Apps	Goals	Apps	Goals	Apps	Goals	Apps	Goals
Quilmes	2017–18	Primera B Nacional	0	0	0	0	—		0	0	0	0
Quilmes	2018–19	Primera B Nacional	0	0	0	0	—		0	0	0	0
Quilmes	Total		0	0	0	0	—		0	0	0	0
Godoy Cruz	2018–19	Primera División	1	0	0	0	0	0	0	0	1	0
Career total			1	0	0	0	0	0	0	0	1	0
