= Ivan Smith (Australian footballer) =

Australian rules footballer (1933–2020)

Personal information
- Full name: Ivan Smith
- Born: 31 December 1933
- Died: 9 December 2020 (aged 86)
- Original team: Robinvale
- Height: 185 cm (6 ft 1 in)
- Weight: 86 kg (190 lb)

Playing career^{1}
Years	Club	Games (Goals)
1956	Fitzroy	4 (0)
- ^{1} Playing statistics correct to the end of 1956.

Ivan Smith (31 December 1933 – 9 December 2020) was an Australian rules footballer who played with Fitzroy in the Victorian Football League (VFL).
