= Mauricio Larriera =

Uruguayan football manager (born 1970)

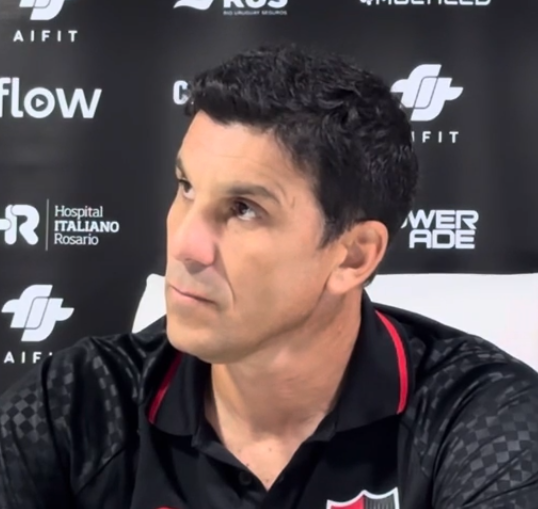
- Larriera in 2024

Personal information
- Full name: José Mauricio Larriera Dibarboure
- Date of birth: 26 August 1970 (age 56)
- Place of birth: Florida, Uruguay
- Height: 1.76 m (5 ft 9 in)
- Position: Right-back

Team information
- Current team: Defensor Sporting (manager)

Senior career*
Years	Team	Apps	(Gls)
1989–1994	Liverpool Montevideo		
1994–1995	Rentistas		
1996–1997	Miramar Misiones		
1998	Deportivo Maldonado		
1999–2001	Racing Montevideo		
2002	Rentistas		
2003–2005	El Tanque Sisley		

Managerial career
- 2007: Alianza Lima (assistant)
- 2007–2009: Nacional (assistant)
- 2010: Universidad de Chile (assistant)
- 2011–2012: Olimpia (assistant)
- 2012–2013: Paraguay (assistant)
- 2013: Sol de América
- 2014: Racing Montevideo
- 2014–2015: Defensor Sporting
- 2015–2016: Al-Wakrah
- 2017: Godoy Cruz
- 2018: O'Higgins
- 2019: Danubio
- 2019–2020: Montevideo Wanderers
- 2021–2022: Peñarol
- 2023: Alianza Lima
- 2024: Newell's Old Boys
- 2025: Everton
- 2026–: Defensor Sporting
- * Club domestic league appearances and goals

José Mauricio Larriera Dibarboure (born 26 August 1970) is a Uruguayan football manager and former player who played as a right-back. He is the current manager of Defensor Sporting.

== Career ==
Larriera started his managerial career with Club Sol de América. After that, he coached Racing Club de Montevideo, Defensor Sporting, Al-Wakrah SC, Godoy Cruz Antonio Tomba, O'Higgins, Danubio, Montevideo Wanderers, and Club Atletico Peñarol. He coached Alianza Lima for the 2023 season before being sacked.

On 29 November 2023, Larriera replaced Gabriel Heinze at the helm of Newell's Old Boys. He was sacked the following 5 June, after a defeat to Banfield.

In March 2025, Larriera assumed as the manager of Everton de Viña del Mar. He left them on 26 October of the same year.
