= Juan Andrada =

Argentine footballer

Personal information
- Full name: Juan Alberto Andrada
- Date of birth: 4 January 1995 (age 31)
- Place of birth: San Luis, Argentina
- Position: Midfielder

Team information
- Current team: Godoy Cruz
- Number: 6

Youth career
- Godoy Cruz

Senior career*
Years	Team	Apps	(Gls)
2016–	Godoy Cruz	102	(0)
2021	→ Arsenal Sarandí (loan)	11	(0)
2022	→ Banfield (loan)	5	(0)
2024–2025	→ Sarmiento (loan)	11	(0)
- * Club domestic league appearances and goals as of 18:38, 12 March 2026 (UTC)

Juan Alberto Andrada (born 4 January 1995) is an Argentine footballer who plays for Godoy Cruz as a midfielder.

== Career statistics ==
As of 13 April 2023.

Club statistics
Club	Division	League			Cup		Continental		Total	
Club	Division	Season	Apps	Goals	Apps	Goals	Apps	Goals	Apps	Goals
Godoy Cruz	Primera División	2016-17	6	0	1	0	—		7	0
Godoy Cruz	Primera División	2017-18	19	0	1	0	0	0	20	0
Godoy Cruz	Primera División	2018-19	12	0	1	0	—		13	0
Godoy Cruz	Primera División	2019-20	17	0	3	0	8	0	28	0
Godoy Cruz	Primera División	2020-21	4	0	1	0	—		5	0
Godoy Cruz	Primera División	2021	0	0	0	0	—		0	0
Godoy Cruz	Primera División	2022	22	0	0	0	—		22	0
Godoy Cruz	Primera División	2023	7	0	0	0	—		7	0
Godoy Cruz	Total		87	0	7	0	8	0	102	0
Arsenal Sarandí	Primera División	2021	11	0	0	0	8	0	19	0
Banfield	Primera División	2022	5	0	0	0	1	0	6	0
Total			103	0	7	0	17	0	127	0
