= Franco González (footballer, born 1999) =

Argentine professional footballer

Personal information
- Full name: Franco Raúl González
- Date of birth: 7 March 1999 (age 27)
- Place of birth: Villa Tulumaya, Argentina
- Position: Midfielder

Team information
- Current team: Deportivo Merlo

Youth career
- Godoy Cruz

Senior career*
Years	Team	Apps	(Gls)
2019–2020	Godoy Cruz	4	(0)
2021	Gimnasia Mendoza	5	(0)
2022–	Deportivo Merlo	5	(0)
- * Club domestic league appearances and goals as of 17:25, 4 September 2022 (UTC)

Franco Raúl González (born 7 March 1999) is an Argentine professional footballer who plays as a midfielder for Deportivo Merlo.

== Career ==
González was produced by the Godoy Cruz academy. He was promoted into senior football in May 2019 by manager Lucas Bernardi, who selected the midfielder to start a Copa de la Superliga second leg, round of sixteen encounter against Boca Juniors at La Bombonera; featuring, aged twenty, for seventy-nine minutes as the club were eliminated 5–2 on aggregate.

== Career statistics ==
As of 6 May 2019.

Appearances and goals by club, season and competition
Club	Season	League			Cup		League Cup		Continental		Other		Total	
Club	Season	Division	Apps	Goals	Apps	Goals	Apps	Goals	Apps	Goals	Apps	Goals	Apps	Goals
Godoy Cruz	2018–19	Primera División	0	0	0	0	1	0	0	0	0	0	1	0
Career total			0	0	0	0	1	0	0	0	0	0	1	0
