= Diego Dabove =

Argentine football manager

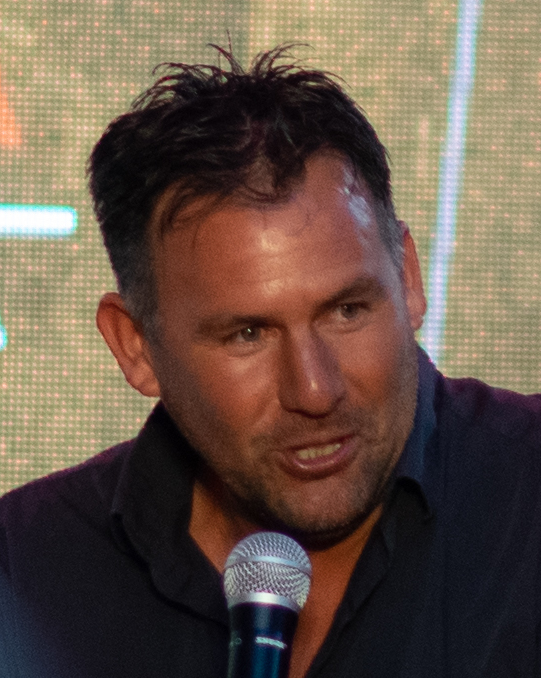
- Dabove in 2020

Personal information
- Full name: Diego Omar Dabove
- Date of birth: 18 January 1973 (age 53)
- Place of birth: Banfield, Argentina
- Height: 1.85 m (6 ft 1 in)
- Position: Goalkeeper

Youth career
- 1984–1993: Lanús

Senior career*
Years	Team	Apps	(Gls)
1993–1994	Lanús	0	(0)
1994	Dock Sud	0	(0)
- Argentino de Quilmes
1998–1999	Cañuelas	35	(0)
- Ferro de General Pico
- SC Laboulaye
2000	Deportivo Riestra	3	(0)

Managerial career
- 2003: Lanús (interim)
- 2013: Racing Olavarría
- 2017–2018: Godoy Cruz (youth)
- 2018: Godoy Cruz
- 2019–2021: Argentinos Juniors
- 2021: San Lorenzo
- 2021: Bahia
- 2021–2022: Banfield
- 2022–2023: Huracán
- 2023–2024: Instituto
- 2025–2026: Tigre
- * Club domestic league appearances and goals

Diego Omar Dabove (born 18 January 1973) is an Argentine football manager and former player who played as a goalkeeper. He was recently the manager of Tigre.

== Playing career ==
Born in Banfield, Dabove was a Lanús youth graduate and was a part of the first team squad for one year. After leaving in 1994, he went on to resume his career in the lower leagues, representing Dock Sud, Argentino de Quilmes, Cañuelas, Ferro Carril Oeste de General Pico, Sporting Club de Laboulaye and Deportivo Riestra.

Dabove retired at the age of just 27 due to a shoulder injury.

== Managerial career ==
Immediately after retiring, Dabove joined Miguel Ángel Russo's staff as a goalkeeping coach at Los Andes. He moved to former club Lanús in 2001, under the same role, and was also an interim manager of the main squad for one match in 2003.

After leaving Lanús in 2004, Dabove worked as a goalkeeping coach at Boca Juniors in 2004 before returning to Lanús in 2005. After a short period at Huracán, he worked under Néstor Gorosito at Rosario Central, Argentinos Juniors (two times), River Plate, Xerez, Independiente and Tigre.

On 8 July 2013, Dabove was appointed manager of Racing de Olavarría, but resigned on 15 October. He returned to his previous goalkeeping coach role in the following year at Racing Club, before being named under the same role at the Bahrain national team.

After leaving Bahrein in June 2016, Dabove was named goalkeeping coach of Sarmiento de Junín before taking the same role Arsenal de Sarandí at the end of the year. In 2017, he was named coach of the youth categories of Godoy Cruz.

On 13 December 2017, Dabove was appointed manager of Godoy Cruz's main squad, replacing Mauricio Larriera. On 8 December of the following year, after qualifying the club to the 2019 Copa Libertadores, he left the club after his contract was due to expire, and took over Argentinos Juniors five days later.

Dabove resigned from Argentinos on 12 January 2021, and was named manager of San Lorenzo seven days later. On 10 May, after the latter's elimination from the 2021 Copa de la Liga Profesional, he asked to leave.

On 18 August 2021, Dabove was appointed manager of Campeonato Brasileiro Série A side Bahia, being the club's eighth foreign manager (fourth Argentine) and the first foreigner since 1979. He was sacked on 6 October, after being in charge for only six matches.

== Managerial statistics ==
As of 23 October 2026

Managerial record by team and tenure
Team	Nat.	From	To	Record								Ref
Team	Nat.	From	To	G	W	D	L	GF	GA	GD	Win %	Ref
Lanús (interim)	(Argentina)	5 July 2003	5 July 2003	1	0	1	0	1	1	+0	0.00	
Racing Olavarría	(Argentina)	8 July 2013	15 October 2013	9	1	3	5	6	14	−8	11.11	
Godoy Cruz	(Argentina)	13 December 2017	8 December 2018	31	19	6	6	48	22	+26	61.29	
Argentinos Juniors	(Argentina)	13 December 2018	12 January 2021	65	27	23	15	63	53	+10	41.54	
San Lorenzo	(Argentina)	19 January 2021	10 May 2021	22	8	6	8	26	28	−2	36.36	
Bahia	(Brazil)	18 August 2021	6 October 2021	6	1	2	3	6	10	−4	16.67	
Banfield	(Argentina)	26 October 2021	10 May 2022	26	10	7	9	29	24	+5	38.46	
Huracán	(Argentina)	26 May 2022	7 May 2023	50	19	18	13	60	46	+14	38.00	
Instituto	(Argentina)	7 June 2023	14 November 2024	60	20	17	23	67	63	+4	33.33	
Tigre	(Argentina)	2 January 2025	23 October 2026	81	29	26	26	88	71	+17	35.80	
Career total				351	134	109	108	393	332	+61	38.18	—
