= Godoy Cruz, Mendoza =

Godoy Cruz
- City
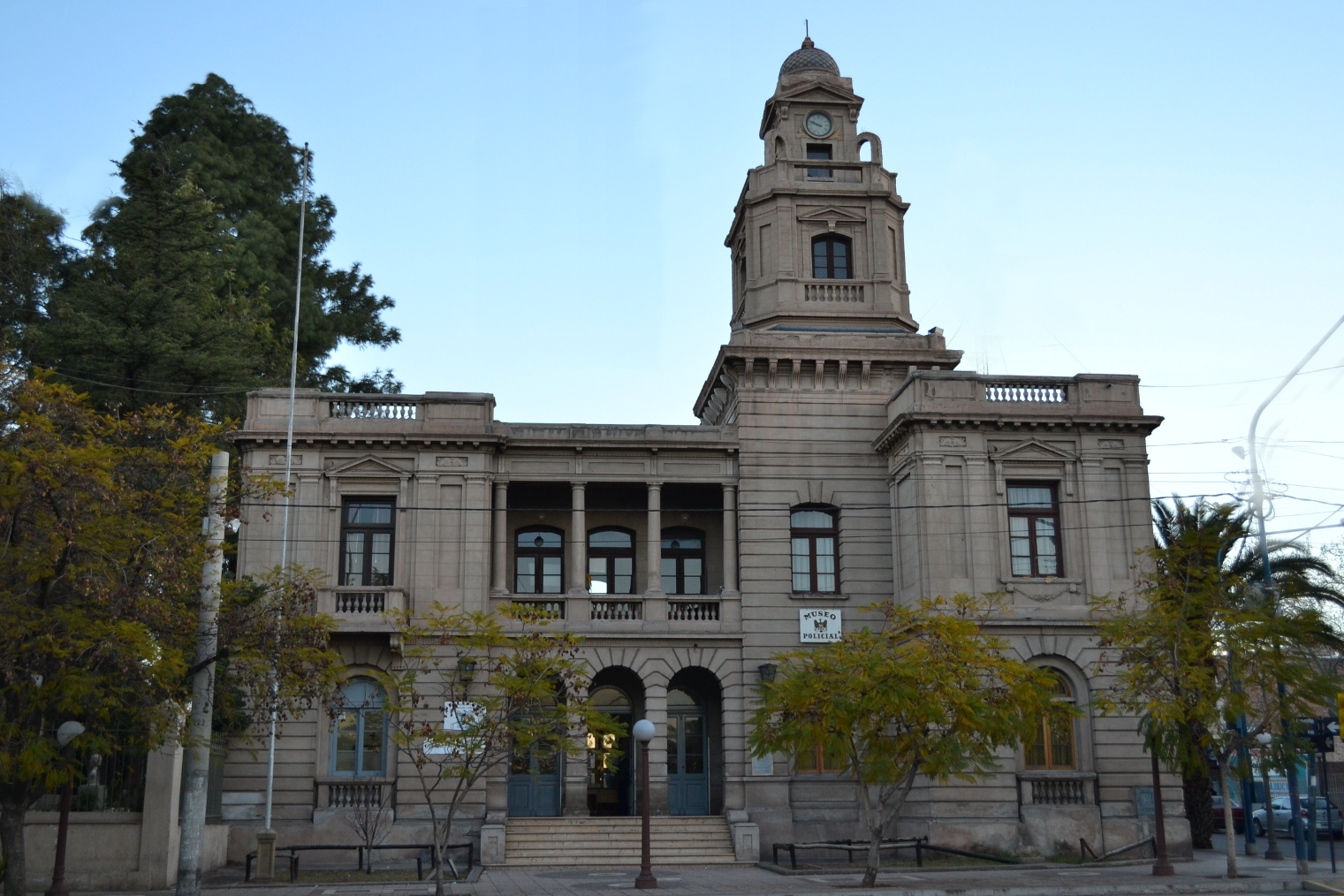
- Comisaría Séptima

- Location of Godoy Cruz in Argentina
- Coordinates: 32°55′S 68°50′W
- Country: Argentina
- Province: Mendoza
- Department: Godoy Cruz

Population (2010 census)
  - Total: 191,299
- Time zone: UTC−3 (ART)
- CPA base: M5501
- Dialing code: +54 261
- Climate: BWk

Godoy Cruz is a city in the province of Mendoza, Argentina. It has 183,000 inhabitants as per the 2001 census [INDEC], and is part of the metropolitan area of the provincial capital (Mendoza).

== History ==
Godoy Cruz was initially known as Villa de San Vicente (since 1872) and then as Villa Belgrano (1889). On 9 February 1909 it received city status and its current name, in homage to Dr. Tomás Godoy Cruz, who represented the province of Mendoza in the Congress of Tucumán and was also a provincial governor and legislator.

== Sport ==
Godoy Cruz is home to Godoy Cruz Antonio Tomba, a football club which plays in the Argentine Primera División. The city is also home to Andes Talleres Sport Club, which competes the Argentine Regional Tournament. The two teams compete in the "Clásico Mendocino" (the "Mendocino Derby"), however, it has not been contested competitively since 1993 due to the teams playing in different divisions.

Famous sportspeople include Carlos Maslup.
