= Godoy Cruz Antonio Tomba =

Argentine sports club

Godoy Cruz
- Full name: Club Deportivo Godoy Cruz Antonio Tomba
- Nicknames: Tomba; Bodeguero (Wine-Producer); El Expreso (Express)
- Founded: 1 June 1921; 105 years ago
- Ground: Estadio Feliciano Gambarte
- Capacity: 21,000
- Chairman: Carlos Puyol
- Manager: Mariano Toedtli
- League: Liga Profesional (since 2027)
- 2026 Primera Nacional: 1st (Promoted via final)
- Website: clubgodoycruz.com.ar
Home colours	Away colours	Third colours

Club Deportivo Godoy Cruz Antonio Tomba is an Argentine sports club from Godoy Cruz, Mendoza. The club is best known for its football team, which will play in the Liga Profesional de Fútbol since 2027, the first top level of the Argentine football league system, after being champions of the 2026 Primera Nacional.

Other activities practised at Godoy Cruz are basketball, team handball, field hockey, tennis and volleyball.

== History ==
Godoy Cruz was born as an institution in 1921. It all started when a group of friends gathered in the "Victoria Bar" (located opposite the departmental square at that time), decided to found a club, taking advantage of the boom at the time. Thus was born on 1 June 1921, the Club Sportivo Godoy Cruz with the novice presidency of Don Romero Garay.

The club was officially founded on 21 June 1921 under the name "Sportivo Godoy Cruz", and changed to its current name on 25 April 1930 after the fusion with "Deportivo Bodega Antonio Tomba". In 1959, Godoy Cruz' stadium, the Estadio Feliciano Gambarte, was constructed. The stadium is nicknamed La Bodega (Spanish for "wine cellar") and holds 21,000 people.

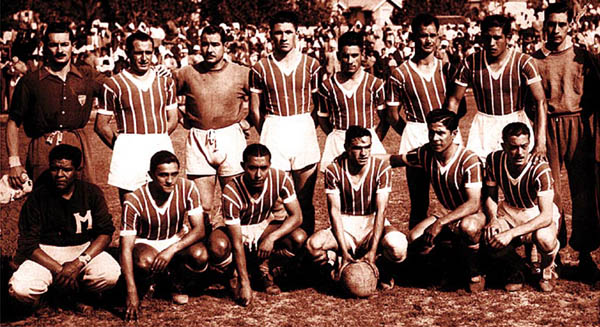
The team of 1954

Godoy Cruz played in the regional league for several years before reaching the national level. The club won the Mendoza first division championship in 1944, 1947, 1950, 1951, 1954, 1968, and also in 1989 and 1990 that qualified to play in the defunct Torneo del Interior national-level tournament.

Winning the Torneo del Interior in 1994, Godoy Cruz reached the Primera B Nacional (Argentine second division) that year. After more than ten years in the second division, the club was finally promoted to the Primera División in 2006, after winning the 2005–06 season of the Primera B Nacional, defeating Nueva Chicago in the final.

Twenty-year-old Enzo Pérez scored the first goal by Godoy Cruz in the Argentine Primera, in a 1–1 draw with Belgrano on 9 September 2006.

At the end of the 2006–07 season, Godoy Cruz was relegated from the Primera after losing their promotion/relegation play-off with Huracán. Their stay in the second division was short, as they earned automatic promotion to the first division after finishing runners-up to San Martín de Tucumán during the 2007–08 season.

Godoy Cruz under Omar Asad's management during the 2010 Clausura can be considered as a turning point in the club's success in top-level competition, earning accolades from both fans and sport journalists alike. In that tournament, they achieved the best-ever point total (37) at the time, for a team indirectly affiliated to the Argentine Football Association (meaning clubs under the administration of the Consejo Federal (Federal Council) branch of AFA, which are teams outside Buenos Aires, Greater Buenos Aires, Rosario and Santa Fe). These results qualified them for the 2011 Copa Libertadores, their first appearance in this tournament.

The club's Superliga Argentina 2017/18 season, can be considered as the club's finest performance in Primera Division, finishing second place. After an erratic start to the season which lead to the sacking of Lucas Bernardi and his Uruguayan replacement, Mauricio Larriera, Godoy Cruz —placed midtable (twelfth after Matchday 12) in league standing at the time— improvised to begin the 2018 half of the season by promoting manager Diego Dabove who had been coaching the reserve team since 2017. Dabove restructured the starting 11 into an efficient counter-attacking unit. Although the club rarely dominated possession statistics game after game, "El Tomba" amassed 56 points in 27 games played, with in-form striker Santiago García —who converted 17 goals; earning him the Top Goals Scored and Best Forward awards— helping the team set their own club record of 6 consecutive wins during a late season push (Matchday 18 to 23) to keep eventual title winners Boca Juniors unable to clinch the division title until the penultimate matchday. Perhaps in hindsight, Godoy Cruz's early season inconsistency and Matchday 24 draw away at Banfield with a last-gasp 90'+3 goal-line save by Banfield defender Adrián Sporle, were key factors in finishing only two points behind Boca's 58 points.

== South American Tournament Qualification ==
Godoy Cruz is the first club in Mendoza and the fifth indirectly affiliated (to AFA) club to play in CONMEBOL tournaments.

The club's absolute debut in the 2011 Copa Libertadores Group 8, pitted the club against a trifecta of historic Libertadores champions: 2008 winners LDU Quito from Ecuador, 5-time champions Peñarol of Uruguay, and the record-holding 7-time champions (as the most successful club in the cup's history) Independiente. The opening match (and resulting 2-1 home win) on 17 February 2011 against LDU Quito marked a historic moment; Godoy Cruz had become the second indirectly affiliated side ever to represent Argentina in the Copa Libertadores (Talleres de Córdoba qualified to the 2002 Copa Libertadores), however was the first of these to win their debut match. The "Tomba" was eliminated in the group stage.

Later in 2011, the club debut in the 2011 Copa Sudamericana tournament in the Second Stage round, defeating Lanús on an away goal tiebreaker (2-2 away / 0–0 home), arriving until Round of 16, losing in Peru to Universitario on penalties (2-3; after drawing both home & away legs 1-1) on 20 October 2011.

In 2012 he plays his second Copa Libertadores, playing in the group stage against Peñarol, Universidad de Chile and Atlético Nacional The "Express" could not pass another instance more than this phase.

In 2014, Godoy Cruz would play the second Copa Sudamericana, being eliminated before Club Atlético River Plate (champion of the edition of this tournament) in parties of ida (0:1) and return (0:2).

In 2017, Tomba will play for the third time in its history of the Copa Libertadores, fruit of the good championship that secured in 2016, and thus achieving the classification of the name of the tournament.

Season	Competition	Round	Club	Home	Away	Aggregate
2011	Copa Libertadores	Second stage	(Ecuador) LDU Quito	2–1	0–2	4th
2011	Copa Libertadores	Second stage	(Uruguay) Peñarol	1–3	1–2	4th
2011	Copa Libertadores	Second stage	(Argentina) Independiente	1–1	3–1	4th
2011	Copa Sudamericana	Second stage	(Argentina) Lanús	0–0	2–2	2–2 (a.)
2011	Copa Sudamericana	Round of 16	(Peru) Universitario	1–1	1–1	2–2 (p. 2–3)
2012	Copa Libertadores	Second stage	Universidad de Chile	0–1	1–5	3rd
2012	Copa Libertadores	Second stage	(Colombia) Atlético Nacional	4–4	2–2	3rd
2012	Copa Libertadores	Second stage	(Uruguay) Peñarol	1–0	2–4	3rd
2014	Copa Sudamericana	Second stage	(Argentina) River Plate	0–1	0–2	0–3
2017	Copa Libertadores	Group stage	(Brazil) Atlético Mineiro	1–1	1–4	2nd
2017	Copa Libertadores	Group stage	(Paraguay) Libertad	1–1	2–1	2nd
2017	Copa Libertadores	Group stage	(Bolivia) Sport Boys	2–0	3–1	2nd
2017	Copa Libertadores	Round of 16	(Brazil) Grêmio	0–1	1–2	1–3
2019	Copa Libertadores	Group stage	(Paraguay) Olimpia	0–0	1–2	2nd
2019	Copa Libertadores	Group stage	(Peru) Sporting Cristal	2–0	1–1	2nd
2019	Copa Libertadores	Group stage	(Chile) Universidad de Concepción	1–0	0–0	2nd
2019	Copa Libertadores	Round of 16	(Brazil) Palmeiras	2–2	0–4	2–6

== Rivalries ==
Godoy Cruz's classic rival is Andes Talleres Sport Club, a neighborhood classic that has not been played since 1993, thanks to the "Tomba" promotions and the "Azulgrana" soccer debacle. In addition, Godoy Cruz has provincial classics such as San Martín de Mendoza, Independiente Rivadavia and Gimnasia y Esgrima de Mendoza. They also have a rivalry with San Martin de San Juan, with whom they play the Cuyo Classic.

== Nickname ==
Godoy Cruz is nicknamed Tomba and Bodeguero, in reference to the wine selling activity of the Deportivo Bodega Antonio Tomba, one of the merging clubs of 1921. Since the stadium is located near a railway, the club is also called El Expreso ("The Express").

== Players ==
=== Current squad ===
As of 31 August 2025.

Note: Flags indicate national team as defined under FIFA eligibility rules; some limited exceptions apply. Players may hold more than one non-FIFA nationality.

No.	Pos.	Nation	Player
1	GK	ARG	Franco Petroli
2	DF	ARG	Hector Luna
3	DF	ARG	Juan Morán
4	DF	ARG	Lucas Arce
5	MF	PAR	Juan Escobar
6	DF	ARG	Leandro Quiroz
8	MF	ARG	Agustín Valverde
9	FW	ARG	Yaqub
10	FW	ARG	Isaac Ayala
11	FW	ARG	Daniel Barrea
13	MF	URU	Nicolás Fernández
14	MF	ARG	Agustín Villalobos
15	DF	ARG	Francisco Facello (on loan from Belgrano)
16	MF	ARG	Maxi González (on loan from Lanús)
17	GK	ARG	Nicolás Cláa (on loan from Lanús)

No.	Pos.	Nation	Player
20	MF	ARG	Misael Sosa
21	DF	ARG	Andrés Meli
22	MF	ARG	Pol Fernández
23	DF	ARG	Federico Rasmussen
24	FW	CHI	Bastián Yáñez
25	MF	URU	Vicente Poggi
27	MF	ARG	Santino Andino
29	DF	ARG	Leonardo Jara
31	FW	ARG	Agustín Auzmendi
32	MF	ARG	Gonzalo Abrego
35	MF	ARG	Luciano Pascual
40	GK	ARG	Edilson Salinas
41	FW	ARG	Facundo Altamira
59	MF	ARG	Walter Montoya
80	MF	ARG	Maximiliano Porcel (on loan from Vélez Sarsfield)

==== Out on loan ====
Note: Flags indicate national team as defined under FIFA eligibility rules; some limited exceptions apply. Players may hold more than one non-FIFA nationality.

No.	Pos.	Nation	Player
7	MF	ARG	Emanuel Quinteros (at UAI Urquiza until 31 December 2024)
12	GK	ARG	Rodrigo Saracho (at Deportivo Riestra until 30 June 2025)
18	MF	ARG	Brandon Cuello (at Juventud Unida Universitario until 31 December 2024)
19	MF	ARG	Julián Eseiza (at Deportivo Madryn until 30 June 2025)
26	DF	ARG	Gianluca Ferrari (at Atlético Tucumán until 31 December 2024)
28	DF	ARG	Leonel González (at Melgar until 31 December 2024)
30	MF	ARG	Juan Andrada (at Sarmiento until 31 December 2025)
33	FW	ARG	Alan Cantero (at Barracas Central until 31 December 2024)

No.	Pos.	Nation	Player
34	MF	ARG	Luciano Pizarro (at Güemes until 31 December 2024)
36	FW	ARG	Gastón Pedernera (at San Martín de Mendoza until 31 December 2024)
37	FW	ARG	Matías Ramírez (at Defensa y Justicia until 31 December 2025)
38	FW	ARG	Sebastián Lomonaco (at Panetolikos until 31 December 2024)
39	MF	ARG	Valentín Burgoa (at Sarmiento until 31 December 2025)
42	DF	ARG	Guillermo Ortiz (at Audax Italiano until 31 December 2024)
77	FW	MEX	Luca Martínez (at Juárez until 31 December 2026)

=== Retired numbers ===
No.	Player	Pos.	Tenure	Reason	Ref.
18	(Uruguay) Santiago García	FW	2016–2021	Posthumous	

== Friendly matches ==
Godoy Cruz played friendly matches against both domestic clubs and from other countries. A memorable friendly played in 1964, against Santos Football Club, with soccer star Pelé ended in favor of the Brazilian team by a score of 3–2. In 1969, against Universidad de Chile, the "Expreso" claimed a 3–0 victory. Another match in 1990, against Sevilla in which the team from Mendoza claimed victory by a score of 2–1. In 2007, a visiting Godoy Cruz squad were defeated 5-nil by Nacional de Montevideo. Godoy Cruz also played several friendly matches against national teams, such as Argentina in 1969, Chile in 1970, and Poland in 1977.

A source of historical pride for the team's supporters are two friendly matches won against Argentine giants: in 1965, they defeated Boca Juniors 4–0, and in 1997 they defeated River Plate by the same margin.

Godoy Cruz won the summer 2009 edition of the friendly pentagonal cup known as the "Copa Ciudad de Tandil", after defeating both Chacarita Juniors and Quilmes in penalty shootouts.

== Managers ==
- (Argentina) Humberto Grondona (1996–98)
- (Argentina) Luis Manuel Blanco (2002)
- (Argentina) Pedro Troglio (2004)
- (Argentina) Juan Manuel Llop (5 Apr 2005 – 30 Jun 2007)
- (Argentina) Sergio Batista (1 Jan 2007 – 1 Sep 2007)
- (Argentina) Daniel Oldrá (2007–08)
- (Argentina) Diego Cocca (1 Oct 2008 – 1 Dec 2009)
- (Argentina) Enzo Trossero (8 Nov 2009 – 31 Dec 2009)
- (Argentina) Omar Asad (1 Jan 2010 – 31 Dec 2010)
- (Uruguay) Jorge "Polilla" da Silva (15 Dec 2010 – 18 Dec 2011)
- (Argentina) Nery Pumpido (24 Dec 2011 – 16 Apr 2012)
- (Argentina) Omar Asad (19 Apr 2012 – 18 Nov 2012)
- (Argentina) Martín Palermo (21 Nov 2012 – 6 Dec 2013)
- (Argentina) Jorge Almirón (9 Dec 2013 – 18 July 2014)
- (Argentina) Carlos Mayor (19 Jul 2014 – 8 Oct 2014)
- (Argentina) Daniel Oldrá (9 Oct 2014 – 14 Jun 2015)
- (Argentina) Gabriel Heinze (2015)
- (Argentina) Daniel Oldrá (2015)
- (Argentina) Sebastián Méndez (1 Dec 2015 – 16 Dec 2016)
- (Argentina) Lucas Bernardi (20 Dec 2016 – 5 Jul 2017)
- (Uruguay) Mauricio Larriera (12 Jul 2017 – 5 Dec 2017)
- (Argentina) Diego Dabove (14 Dec 2017 – 9 Dec 2018)
- (Argentina) Marcelo Gómez (28 Dec 2018 – 24 Feb 2019)
- (Argentina) Lucas Bernardi (2 Mar 2019 – 20 Aug 2019)
- (Argentina) Javier Patalano (20 Aug 2019–Sep 2019)
- (Argentina) Daniel Oldrá (Sep 2019–5 Dec 2019)
- (Argentina) Mario Sciacqua (6 Dec 2019 – 15 May 2020)
- (Argentina) Diego Martínez (27 May 2020 – 28 Dec 2020)
- (Argentina) Daniel Oldrá (29 Dec 2020 – 17 Jan 2021)
- (Argentina) Sebastián Méndez (18 Jan 2021 – 30 Aug 2021)
- (Argentina) Diego Flores (31 Aug 2021 – 9 Apr 2022)
- (Argentina) Favio Orsi & (Argentina) Sergio Gómez (10 Apr 2022 – 28 Oct 2022)
- (Argentina) Diego Flores (3 Nov 2022 – 10 Apr 2023)
- (Argentina) Daniel Oldrá (11 Apr 2023–)

== Stadium ==
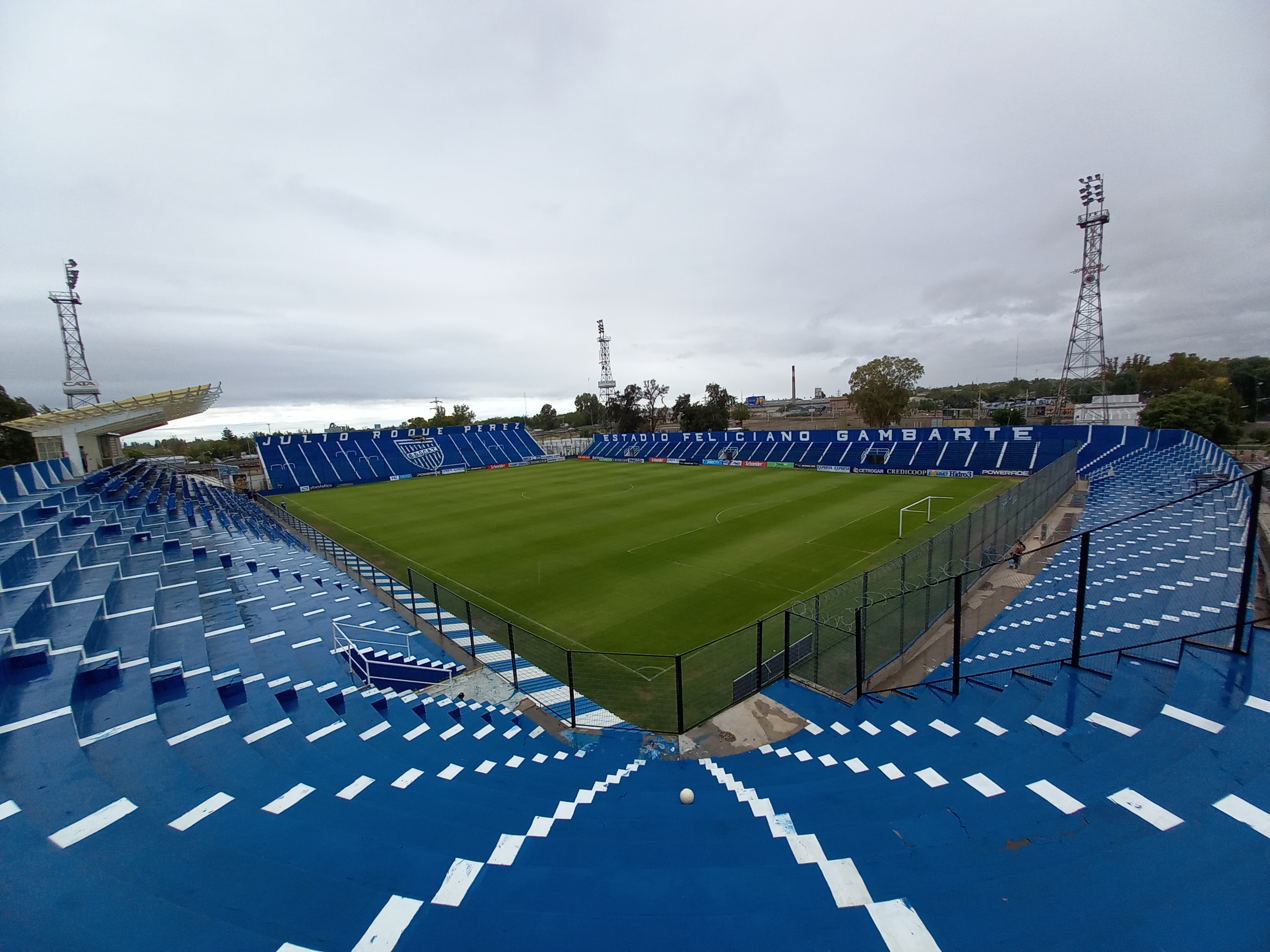
Godoy Cruz Stadium.

The official club stadium is the "Estadio Feliciano Gambarte" opened in 1959. It was last used for AFA-sanctioned matches in 2004, hosting Tiro Federal, to a 0–0 draw. AFA applied changes to the "Reglamento General" competition rulebook in 2005, leading to the club's stadium no longer meeting the new standards indicated in Article 74. The club have since rented the provincial Estadio Malvinas Argentinas for use on matchdays.

A vocal group of fans, supported by a select group of local media personalities, began infrequent campaigns since 2014 to begin renovations to the club stadium, in a bid to gain AFA re-certification. These campaigns have accomplished to this date the repair and repainting of the grandstands, as well as some general refurbishments to the roof and unfinished pressbox structures and perimeter fencing of the turf.

An official request to play at the stadium was made during the 2021 Copa de la Liga Profesional as the turf of the Malvinas Argentinas required re-seeding among other refurbishments in preparation to host matches for the 2021 Copa América. The restrictions on stadium capacity were exempted amidst the on-going global COVID-19 pandemic which in Argentina implied severe reductions to public access at sporting events. The club, along with volunteering fans, set forth on more renovations, which included full stadium repainting, rebuilding the previously unfinished press cabins, new pavement ingress areas for the club busses, new expansions to the dressing rooms, new pitch line dimensions (a 2m increase of length to 105m by 68m), as well as new stadium LED floodlighting suitable for night-time HD broadcasts which was earmarked for future install.

On 11 April 2021, Godoy Cruz hosted Arsenal de Sarandí at the Gambarte, 5775 days after the previous official match there.

== Coquimbito practice facility ==
The club owns a 12-hectare "High-Performance Sports Park" in the rural district of Coquimbito, Maipu. Incorporating hotel-styled player barracks, a multimedia library for team research, press/media rooms, and 11 separate fields —of various dimensions, field, and turf types— it is one of the largest practice facilities of this type in Argentina outside of Buenos Aires.

== Honours ==
=== National ===
- Primera Nacional (2): 2005–06, 2026
- Torneo del Interior (1): 1993–94

=== Regional ===
- Primera A de Liga Mendocina (9): 1944, 1947, 1950, 1951, 1954, 1968, 1989, 1990, 2012
- Primera B de Liga Mendocina (1): 1922
- Vendimia Cup (9): 1965, 1966, 1969, 1970, 1990, 1993, 2002, 2015, 2016.
