= 2019–20 Defensa y Justicia season =

Defensa y Justicia
2019–20 season
- President: José Lemme
- Manager: Mariano Soso
- Stadium: Estadio Norberto "Tito" Tomaghello
- Top goalscorer: League: Fernando Márquez (1); Rafael Delgado; All: Marcelo Herrera (1); Fernando Márquez; Rafael Delgado

The 2019–20 season is Defensa y Justicia's 7th consecutive season in the top division of Argentine football. In addition to the Primera División, the club are competing in the Copa Argentina, Copa de la Superliga and Copa Libertadores.

The season generally covers the period from 1 July 2019 to 30 June 2020.

== Review ==
=== Pre-season ===
Before welcoming any new faces, Defensa y Justicia said goodbye to three players in the early months. Lisandro Martínez's transfer to Eredivisie side Ajax was announced on 20 May 2019, while Leonel Miranda switched Argentina for Mexico by signing for Tijuana and Ciro Rius left across the Primera División to Rosario Central in early June. José Luis Fernández was their next departure, as he joined Atlético Tucumán on 17 June. Jonás Gutiérrez departed to Banfield on 19 June. Three incomings came on 24 June, with Marcelo Herrera, Gonzalo Piovi and Juan Rodríguez moving from Belgrano, Racing Club and Fénix - while Daniel González went to Dorados de Sinaloa. Héctor Martínez, from River Plate, was loaned on 27 June. A day after, Rafael Barrios left for San Martín.

Defensa y Justicia defeated Defensores de Belgrano 2–0 on 29 June in a pre-season friendly, with the goals coming from Alexis Castro and Nicolás Fernández. They met in a second match straight after, with Héctor Martínez scoring his first goal in a 1–0 win. A number of players who were out on loan in 2018–19 officially returned to Defensa on 30 June 2019, with the ones loaned in doing likewise. Maximiliano Caire was signed by Gimnasia y Esgrima on 1 July, on the same day as Guido Mainero completed a loan move in from Vélez Sarsfield. Hours later, Nicolás Maná was snapped up; having spent the prior months unattached after leaving Greek team Panetolikos. Defensa captured Enzo Coacci from Olimpo on 2 July. Fernando Barrientos went back to Lanús soon after.

Hugo Silva moved to Estudiantes (BA) of Primera B Nacional on 1 July. Defensa remained unbeaten in pre-season on 3 July, after beating and drawing with Huracán at the Estadio Norberto "Tito" Tomaghello. Diego Mat. Rodríguez went to promoted Central Córdoba on 5 July, as Leonardo Villalba did on 12 July. Fernando Pellegrino rejoined Huracán on loan on 5 July, having returned from the same transaction on 30 June. Defensa drew back-to-back with Chacarita Juniors in friendlies on 6 July. Paraguayan youngster Braian Ojeda was loaned from Olimpia on 12 July. Newell's Old Boys were fought in exhibition matches on 13 July, with Defensa coming away without goals or a victory; drawing and losing games at the Predio Áreas Grandes in Florencio Varela.

Talleres, of Remedios de Escalada, clinched the loan signing of Matías Sosa on 17 July. Gonzalo Arrieta departed to Flandria on 19 July. Defensa revealed their squad numbers for 2019–20 on 19 July.

=== July ===
Marcelo Herrera scored in Defensa y Justicia's opening competitive fixture of 2019–20, as he netted to take a Copa Argentina encounter with Gimnasia y Esgrima to penalties; which Defensa won, though Herrera was sent off early in the second half. Raúl Loaiza, who was on loan to San Lorenzo last season, joined Defensa permanently from Atlético Nacional on 25 July. After the arrival of Ojeda, a second Paraguayan in Aldo Maiz entered the ranks from General Díaz on 27 July. Defensa suffered a loss to Independiente on the opening day in the league on 28 July.

=== August ===
On 1 August, Neri Cardozo was signed by Mariano Soso from Racing Club. Soon after, Juan Martín Lucero and Diego Mar. Rodríguez agreed contracts with Defensa from Liga MX's Tijuana. That date also saw Lucas Villarruel leave for Newell's Old Boys. Defensa made it two defeats from two Primera División fixtures on 4 August, losing on the road against Unión Santa Fe. Defensa's poor start to the competitive season continued on 18 August, as Arsenal de Sarandí scored three unanswered goals in the league at the Estadio Norberto "Tito" Tomaghello. Defensa met fellow winless club Gimnasia y Esgrima on 24 August, with Defensa coming away with their first victory after Rafael Delgado's strike in the second half. Defensa's first draw came on 30 August - versus Banfield.

== Squad ==
Squad No.	Nationality	Name	Position(s)	Date of birth (age)	Signed from
Goalkeepers
17	Argentina	Nicolás Avellaneda	GK	23 February 1993 (age 33)	Lanús (loan)
22	Argentina	Ezequiel Unsain	GK	9 March 1995 (age 31)	Newell's Old Boys
	Argentina	Lucio Chiappero	GK	26 May 1994 (age 32)	Academy
Defenders
2	Argentina	Adonis Frías	CB	17 March 1998 (age 28)	Academy
3	Argentina	Marcelo Benítez	DF	13 January 1991 (age 35)	Academy
4	Paraguay	Julio González	RB	28 June 1992 (age 34)	General Díaz
14	Argentina	Marcelo Herrera	CB	26 February 1992 (age 34)	Belgrano
16	Argentina	Gonzalo Piovi	LB	8 September 1994 (age 32)	Racing Club
19	Argentina	Nicolás Tripichio	RB	5 January 1996 (age 30)	Vélez Sarsfield
21	Argentina	Héctor Martínez	CB	21 January 1998 (age 28)	River Plate (loan)
28	Argentina	Juan Rodríguez	CB	28 February 1994 (age 32)	Fénix
33	Argentina	Rafael Delgado	LB	13 January 1990 (age 36)	Estudiantes
	Argentina	Leonardo Marchi	DF	17 September 1996 (age 30)	Academy
	Argentina	Santiago Zurbriggen	RB	27 February 1990 (age 36)	Lanús
Midfielders
5	Argentina	Neri Cardozo	LM	8 August 1986 (age 40)	Racing Club
7	Argentina	Bautista Merlini	LM	4 July 1995 (age 31)	San Lorenzo (loan)
8	Argentina	Guido Mainero	RM	23 March 1995 (age 31)	Vélez Sarsfield (loan)
11	Argentina	Alexis Castro	LM	18 October 1994 (age 32)	San Lorenzo (loan)
15	Uruguay	Diego Mar. Rodríguez	DM	4 September 1989 (age 37)	Tijuana
18	Argentina	Francisco Cerro	LM	9 February 1988 (age 38)	Rayo Vallecano
26	Paraguay	Braian Ojeda	CM	27 June 2000 (age 26)	Olimpia (loan)
27	Argentina	Enzo Coacci	MF	9 August 1998 (age 28)	Olimpo
30	Colombia	Raúl Loaiza	DM	8 June 1994 (age 32)	Atlético Nacional
	Uruguay	Ignacio González	LM	5 November 1993 (age 33)	Danubio
	Paraguay	Aldo Maiz	MF	27 August 2000 (age 26)	General Díaz
	Argentina	Tomás Ortiz	MF	10 March 2000 (age 26)	Academy
	Argentina	Lautaro Quiroz	MF	3 July 1998 (age 28)	Academy
Forwards
9	Argentina	Fernando Márquez	CF	10 December 1987 (age 38)	Johor Darul Ta'zim (loan)
29	Argentina	Nicolás Fernández	LW	8 February 1996 (age 30)	Academy
31	Argentina	Nicolás Maná	RW	25 March 1994 (age 32)	Panetolikos
32	Argentina	Ignacio Aliseda	LW	14 March 2000 (age 26)	Academy
	Argentina	Juan Martín Lucero	CF	30 November 1991 (age 34)	Tijuana
	Argentina	Ricardo Ramírez	FW	27 April 1999 (age 27)	Academy
Out on loan					Loaned to
	Argentina	Eugenio Isnaldo	LW	7 January 1994 (age 32)	Unión La Calera
	Argentina	Fernando Pellegrino	GK	31 March 1986 (age 40)	Huracán (loan)
	Argentina	Matías Sosa	AM	6 July 1995 (age 31)	Talleres (RE)

== Transfers ==
Domestic transfer windows:
3 July 2019 to 24 September 2019
20 January 2020 to 19 February 2020.

=== Transfers in ===
Date from	Position	Nationality	Name	From	Ref.
1 July 2019	RW	Argentina	Nicolás Maná	Unattached (Note: Previously played for Panetolikos (2018–2019).)	
3 July 2019 (Note: Deal agreed on 24 June 2019)	CB	Argentina	Marcelo Herrera	Belgrano	
3 July 2019 (Note: Deal agreed on 24 June 2019)	LB	Argentina	Gonzalo Piovi	Racing Club	
3 July 2019 (Note: Deal agreed on 24 June 2019)	CB	Argentina	Juan Rodríguez	Fénix	
3 July 2019 (Note: Deal agreed on 2 July 2019)	MF	Argentina	Enzo Coacci	Olimpo	
25 July 2019	DM	Colombia	Raúl Loaiza	Atlético Nacional	
27 July 2019	MF	Paraguay	Aldo Maiz	General Díaz	
1 August 2019	LM	Argentina	Neri Cardozo	Racing Club	
1 August 2019	CF	Argentina	Juan Martín Lucero	Tijuana	
1 August 2019	DM	Argentina	Diego Mar. Rodríguez	Tijuana	

=== Transfers out ===
Date from	Position	Nationality	Name	To	Ref.
14 June 2019 (Note: Deal agreed on 8 June 2019)	CM	Argentina	Leonel Miranda	Tijuana	
24 June 2019	LM	Argentina	Daniel González	Dorados de Sinaloa	
1 July 2019 (Note: Deal agreed on 20 May 2019)	CB	Argentina	Lisandro Martínez	Ajax	
3 July 2019 (Note: Deal agreed on 11 June 2019)	RW	Argentina	Ciro Rius	Rosario Central	
3 July 2019 (Note: Deal agreed on 17 June 2019)	LM	Argentina	José Luis Fernández	Atlético Tucumán	
3 July 2019 (Note: Deal agreed on 19 June 2019)	LM	Argentina	Jonás Gutiérrez	Banfield	
3 July 2019 (Note: Deal agreed on 28 June 2019)	RB	Argentina	Rafael Barrios	San Martín	
3 July 2019 (Note: Deal agreed on 1 July 2019)	RB	Argentina	Maximiliano Caire	Gimnasia y Esgrima	
3 July 2019 (Note: Deal agreed on 1 July 2019)	CB	Argentina	Hugo Silva	Estudiantes (BA)	
5 July 2019	MF	Argentina	Diego Mat. Rodríguez	Central Córdoba	
12 July 2019	RW	Argentina	Leonardo Villalba	Central Córdoba	
19 July 2019	CB	Argentina	Gonzalo Arrieta	Flandria	
1 August 2019	DM	Argentina	Lucas Villarruel	Newell's Old Boys	

=== Loans in ===
Start date	Position	Nationality	Name	From	End date	Ref.
3 July 2019 (Note: Deal agreed on 27 June 2019)	CB	Argentina	Héctor Martínez	River Plate	30 June 2020	
3 July 2019 (Note: Deal agreed on 1 July 2019)	RM	Argentina	Guido Mainero	Vélez Sarsfield	30 June 2020	
12 July 2019	CM	Paraguay	Braian Ojeda	Olimpia	30 June 2020	

=== Loans out ===
Start date	Position	Nationality	Name	To	End date	Ref.
5 July 2019	GK	Argentina	Fernando Pellegrino	Huracán	30 June 2020	
17 July 2019	AM	Argentina	Matías Sosa	Talleres (RE)	30 June 2020	

== Friendlies ==
=== Pre-season ===
Defensa y Justicia's first opponent of pre-season was revealed on 20 June, as Primera B Nacional side Chacarita Juniors scheduled an exhibition match with them for 6 July. A five-match announcement, including games versus Defensores de Belgrano and Temperley, was made by the club on 27 June; though the Temperley meeting was later cancelled.

Win Draw Loss

29 June 2019 Friendly	Defensa y Justicia	2–0	Defensores de Belgrano	Florencio Varela, Argentina
	A. Castro; N. Fernández	Defensa y Justicia; TyC Sports		Stadium: Predio Áreas Grandes

29 June 2019 Friendly	Defensa y Justicia	1–0	Defensores de Belgrano	Florencio Varela, Argentina
	H. Martínez	Defensa y Justicia; TyC Sports		Stadium: Predio Áreas Grandes

3 July 2019 Friendly	Defensa y Justicia	1–1	Huracán	Florencio Varela, Argentina
	N. Fernández	Defensa y Justicia; Grupo La Provincia	A. Chávez	Stadium: Estadio Norberto "Tito" Tomaghello

3 July 2019 Friendly	Defensa y Justicia	1–0	Huracán	Florencio Varela, Argentina
	N. González	Huracán; Grupo La Provincia		Stadium: Estadio Norberto "Tito" Tomaghello

6 July 2019 Friendly	Defensa y Justicia	0–0	Chacarita Juniors	Florencio Varela, Argentina
09:40 GMT-3		Defensa y Justicia; Mundo Ascenso; 80 min. match		Stadium: Predio Áreas Grandes

6 July 2019 Friendly	Defensa y Justicia	1–1	Chacarita Juniors	Florencio Varela, Argentina
11:22 GMT-3	H. Martínez	Defensa y Justicia; Mundo Ascenso; 80 min. match	Y. González	Stadium: Predio Áreas Grandes

10 July 2019 Friendly	Defensa y Justicia	Cancelled	Temperley	Argentina

13 July 2019 Friendly	Defensa y Justicia	0–0	Newell's Old Boys	Florencio Varela, Argentina
		Defensa y Justicia; Rosario3; 80 min. match		Stadium: Predio Áreas Grandes

13 July 2019 Friendly	Defensa y Justicia	0–1	Newell's Old Boys	Florencio Varela, Argentina
		Defensa y Justicia; Rosario3; 80 min. match	M. Formica	Stadium: Predio Áreas Grandes

=== Mid-season ===
A friendly was announced, on 24 June, with newly-promoted tier two team Atlanta. A third encounter versus Atlético Tucumán was also set. Aldosivi revealed an exhibition match with them on 4 September.

Win Draw Loss

29 July 2019 Friendly	Atlanta	Cancelled	Defensa y Justicia	Argentina

Friendly	Atlético Tucumán	Cancelled	Defensa y Justicia	Argentina

7 September 2019 Friendly	Defensa y Justicia	–	Aldosivi	Florencio Varela, Argentina

== Competitions ==
=== Primera División ===
==== League table ====
Pos	Team	Pld	W	D	L	GF	GA	GD	Pts
4	Racing	23	9	12	2	28	23	+5	39
5	Argentinos Juniors	23	10	9	4	22	17	+5	39
6	Defensa y Justicia	23	10	6	7	26	18	+8	36
7	Lanús	23	9	9	5	32	29	+3	36
8	San Lorenzo	23	11	3	9	32	30	+2	36

Source: AFA
Rules for classification: 1) points; 2) play-off (only if needed to decide championship); 3) goal difference; 4) goals scored; 5) head-to-head points; 6) head-to-head goal difference; 7) head-to-head goals scored.

==== Relegation table ====
Pos	Team	2017–18 Pts	2018–19 Pts	2019–20 Pts	Total Pts	Total Pld	Avg	Relegation
2	Racing	45	57	6	108	57	1.895	
3	Arsenal	0	0	9	9	5	1.8	
4	Defensa y Justicia	44	53	4	101	57	1.772	
5	River Plate	45	45	8	98	57	1.719	
6	Independiente	46	38	6	90	56	1.607	

Source: AFA

==== Results summary ====
Overall								Home						Away					
Pld	W	D	L	GF	GA	GD	Pts	W	D	L	GF	GA	GD	W	D	L	GF	GA	GD
5	1	1	3	2	6	−4	4	0	1	2	0	4	−4	1	0	1	2	2	0

Last updated: 31 August 2019.
Source: Soccerway

==== Matches ====
The fixtures for the 2019–20 campaign were released on 10 July.

Win Draw Loss

28 July 2019 1	Defensa y Justicia	0–1	Independiente	Buenos Aires, Argentina
17:45 GMT-3		Defensa y Justicia; Infobae; Soccerway	S. Palacios 33'	Stadium: Estadio Norberto "Tito" Tomaghello; Referee: Patricio Loustau (Argentina)

4 August 2019 2	Unión Santa Fe	2–1	Defensa y Justicia	Santa Fe, Argentina
11:00 GMT-3	W. Bou 33'; Y. Gómez 56'	Unión Santa Fe; Infobae; Soccerway	F. Márquez 47'	Stadium: Estadio 15 de Abril; Referee: Darío Herrera (Argentina)

18 August 2019 3	Defensa y Justicia	0–3	Arsenal de Sarandí	Buenos Aires, Argentina
15:30 GMT-3		Defensa y Justicia; Infobae; Soccerway	L. Parisi 10'; G. Álvarez Suárez 37'; J. Soñora 74'	Stadium: Estadio Norberto "Tito" Tomaghello; Referee: Fernando Espinoza (Argentina)

24 August 2019 4	Gimnasia y Esgrima	0–1	Defensa y Justicia	La Plata, Argentina
13:15 GMT-3		Defensa y Justicia; Infobae; Soccerway	R. Delgado 73'	Stadium: Estadio Juan Carmelo Zerillo; Referee: Andrés Merlos (Argentina)

30 August 2019 5	Defensa y Justicia	0–0	Banfield	Buenos Aires, Argentina
21:10 GMT-3		Defensa y Justicia; Infobae; Soccerway		Stadium: Estadio Norberto "Tito" Tomaghello; Referee: Darío Herrera (Argentina)

6	Central Córdoba	–	Defensa y Justicia	Santiago del Estero, Argentina
				Stadium: Estadio Alfredo Terrera

=== Copa Argentina ===
La Plata's Gimnasia y Esgrima were drawn to face Defensa y Justicia in the Copa Argentina, at the neutral venue of the Estadio Alfredo Beranger in Turdera; all matches in the competition are played neutrally.

Win Draw Loss

20 July 2019 R32	Gimnasia y Esgrima	1–1 (3–4 p)	Defensa y Justicia	Turdera, Argentina
17:10 GMT-3	M. Comba 58'	Defensa y Justicia; Infobae; Soccerway	M. Herrera 45+2'	Stadium: Estadio Alfredo Beranger; Referee: Ariel Penel (Argentina)
	Penalties
	M. García (penalty scored); B. Mansilla (penalty scored); P. Velázquez (penalty scored); H. Tijanovich (penalty missed); V. Ayala (penalty missed)		N. Fernández (penalty scored); G. Piovi (penalty scored); N. Tripichio (penalty scored); A. Castro (penalty scored)

=== Copa de la Superliga ===
Win Draw Loss

	–
00:00 GMT-3

=== Copa Libertadores ===
Win Draw Loss

	–
00:00 GMT-3

== Squad statistics ==
=== Appearances and goals ===
No.	Pos.	Nationality	Name	League		Cup		League Cup		Continental		Total		Discipline		Ref
No.	Pos.	Nationality	Name	Apps	Goals	Apps	Goals	Apps	Goals	Apps	Goals	Apps	Goals	Yellow card	Red card	Ref
2	CB	Argentina	Adonis Frías	0	0	0	0	0	0	0	0	0	0	0	0	
3	DF	Argentina	Marcelo Benítez	1	0	1	0	0	0	0	0	2	0	2	0	
4	RB	Paraguay	Julio González	4	0	0(1)	0	0	0	0	0	4(1)	0	1	0	
5	LM	Argentina	Neri Cardozo	4	0	0	0	0	0	0	0	4	0	0	0	
7	LM	Argentina	Bautista Merlini	0(3)	0	1	0	0	0	0	0	1(3)	0	1	0	
8	RM	Argentina	Guido Mainero	1(2)	0	0(1)	0	0	0	0	0	1(3)	0	2	0	
9	CF	Argentina	Fernando Márquez	3	1	0	0	0	0	0	0	3	1	0	0	
11	LM	Argentina	Alexis Castro	2(3)	0	1	0	0	0	0	0	3(3)	0	2	0	
14	CB	Argentina	Marcelo Herrera	2	0	1	1	0	0	0	0	3	1	1	1	
15	DM	Uruguay	Diego Mar. Rodríguez	3	0	0	0	0	0	0	0	3	0	2	0	
16	LB	Argentina	Gonzalo Piovi	3	0	1	0	0	0	0	0	4	0	3	0	
17	GK	Argentina	Nicolás Avellaneda	0	0	0	0	0	0	0	0	0	0	0	0	
18	LM	Argentina	Francisco Cerro	0	0	0	0	0	0	0	0	0	0	0	0	
19	RB	Argentina	Nicolás Tripichio	1(1)	0	1	0	0	0	0	0	2(1)	0	0	0	
21	CB	Argentina	Héctor Martínez	2(1)	0	0(1)	0	0	0	0	0	2(2)	0	1	0	
22	GK	Argentina	Ezequiel Unsain	5	0	1	0	0	0	0	0	6	0	0	0	
26	CM	Paraguay	Braian Ojeda	1(1)	0	0	0	0	0	0	0	1(1)	0	0	0	
27	MF	Argentina	Enzo Coacci	0(1)	0	0	0	0	0	0	0	0(1)	0	0	0	
28	CB	Argentina	Juan Rodríguez	4	0	0	0	0	0	0	0	4	0	0	0	
29	LW	Argentina	Nicolás Fernández	5	0	1	0	0	0	0	0	6	0	1	0	
30	DM	Colombia	Raúl Loaiza	4	0	0	0	0	0	0	0	4	0	1	0	
31	RW	Argentina	Nicolás Maná	2(2)	0	0	0	0	0	0	0	2(2)	0	0	0	
32	LW	Argentina	Ignacio Aliseda	2(1)	0	1	0	0	0	0	0	3(1)	0	0	0	
33	LB	Argentina	Rafael Delgado	5	1	1	0	0	0	0	0	6	1	1	0	
–	GK	Argentina	Lucio Chiappero	0	0	0	0	0	0	0	0	0	0	0	0	
–	LM	Uruguay	Ignacio González	0	0	0	0	0	0	0	0	0	0	0	0	
–	LW	Argentina	Eugenio Isnaldo	0	0	0	0	0	0	0	0	0	0	0	0	
–	CF	Argentina	Juan Martín Lucero	0	0	0	0	0	0	0	0	0	0	0	0	
–	MF	Paraguay	Aldo Maiz	0	0	0	0	0	0	0	0	0	0	0	0	
–	DF	Argentina	Leonardo Marchi	0	0	0	0	0	0	0	0	0	0	0	0	
–	MF	Argentina	Tomás Ortiz	0	0	0	0	0	0	0	0	0	0	0	0	
–	GK	Argentina	Fernando Pellegrino	0	0	0	0	0	0	0	0	0	0	0	0	
–	MF	Argentina	Lautaro Quiroz	0	0	0	0	0	0	0	0	0	0	0	0	
–	FW	Argentina	Ricardo Ramírez	0	0	0	0	0	0	0	0	0	0	0	0	
–	AM	Argentina	Matías Sosa	0	0	0	0	0	0	0	0	0	0	0	0	
–	RB	Argentina	Santiago Zurbriggen	0	0	0	0	0	0	0	0	0	0	0	0	
Own goals				—	0	—	0	—	0	—	0	—	0	—	—	—
Players who left during the season
5	DM	Argentina	Lucas Villarruel	1	0	1	0	0	0	0	0	2	0	0	0	

Statistics accurate as of 31 August 2019.

=== Goalscorers ===
Rank	Pos	No.	Nat	Name	League	Cup	League Cup	Continental	Total	Ref
1	CB	14	Argentina	Marcelo Herrera	0	1	0	0	1	
1	CF	9	Argentina	Fernando Márquez	1	0	0	0	1	
1	LB	33	Argentina	Rafael Delgado	1	0	0	0	1	
Own goals					0	0	0	0	0	
Totals					2	1	0	0	3	—
