= 2025 Defensa y Justicia season =

Defensa y Justicia
2025 season
- Chairman: José Lemme
- Manager: Pablo De Muner (until 2 May); Tobías Kohan (caretaker, from 3 May)
- Stadium: Estadio Norberto "Tito" Tomaghello
- Primera División: Pre-season
- Copa Argentina: Pre-season
- Copa Sudamericana: Group stage
Home colours	Away colours

The 2025 season is the 90th for Club Social y Deportivo Defensa y Justicia and their 11th consecutive season in the Primera División. The club will also participate in the Copa Argentina and Copa Sudamericana.

== Squad ==
=== Transfers In ===
Pos.	Player	Transferred from	Fee	Date	Source
MF	(Argentina) Lucas González	(Argentina) Independiente	€1,100,000	8 January 2025	
GK	(Argentina) Josué Reinatti	(Argentina) Newell's Old Boys	Loan	6 July 2025	
FW	(Brazil) Lenny Lobato	(Argentina) Vélez Sarsfield	Loan	9 July 2025	
FW	(Argentina) Nicolás Stefanelli	Unattached	Free	19 July 2025	
MF	(Uruguay) Juan Manuel Gutiérrez	(Spain) UD Almería B	Loan	24 July 2025	

=== Transfers Out ===
Pos.	Player	Transferred to	Fee	Date	Source
DF	(Paraguay) Darío Cáceres	(Paraguay) Club Nacional	Loan	13 January 2025	
DF	(Argentina) Hernán Zuliani	(Argentina) San Martín de Tucumán	Loan	14 January 2025	
MF	(Argentina) Franco Romero	(Mexico) Toluca	€1,500,000	15 January 2025	
DF	(Argentina) Santiago Ramos Mingo	(Brazil) Bahia	€4,400,000	16 January 2025	
MF	(Argentina) Gastón González	(Argentina) Sarmiento	Loan	3 July 2025	
MF	(Argentina) Gastón Togni	(Mexico) Pachuca	Loan	5 July 2025	
DF	(Argentina) Agustín Sienra	(Spain) Castellón	Free	7 July 2025	

== Exhibition matches ==
13 January 2025 Friendly	Racing Club de Montevideo (Uruguay)	3–2	(Argentina) Defensa y Justicia

16 January 2025 Friendly	Montevideo City Torque (Uruguay)	1–0	(Argentina) Defensa y Justicia

3 July 2025 Vitória Cup	Cruzeiro (Brazil)	0–1	(Argentina) Defensa y Justicia	Cariacica, Brazil
20:00 UTC−3				Stadium: Estádio Kleber Andrade

6 July 2025 Vitória Cup	Desportiva Ferroviária (Brazil)	1–2	(Argentina) Defensa y Justicia	Cariacica, Brazil
11:00 UTC−3	Trialist 25'		Miritello 44'; Trialist 79'	Stadium: Estádio Engenheiro Alencar Araripe

== Competitions ==
=== Overall record ===
Competition	First match	Last match	Starting round	Record							
Competition	First match	Last match	Starting round	Pld	W	D	L	GF	GA	GD	Win %
Primera División	23 January 2025		Matchday 1	0	0	0	0	0	0	+0	—
Copa Argentina				0	0	0	0	0	0	+0	—
Total				0	0	0	0	0	0	+0	—

Source: Competitions

=== Primera División ===
==== Torneo Apertura ====
===== League table =====
Pos	Team	Pld	W	D	L	GF	GA	GD	Pts	Qualification
8	Estudiantes (LP)	16	5	6	5	18	19	−1	21	Advance to round of 16
9	Newell's Old Boys	16	5	4	7	12	15	−3	19	
10	Defensa y Justicia	16	5	4	7	18	22	−4	19	
11	Central Córdoba (SdE)	16	5	3	8	21	22	−1	18	
12	Belgrano	16	3	8	5	13	23	−10	17	

Source: AFA

===== Results by round =====
Round	1
Ground	H
Result	
Position	

A = Away; H = Home; W = Win; D = Draw; L = Loss

===== Matches =====
23 January 2025 1	Defensa y Justicia	0–1	Banfield	Gobernador Costa
21:30 UTC−3		Report	Nasif 59'	Stadium: Estadio Norberto "Tito" Tomaghello

30 January 2025 2	Aldosivi	0–5	Defensa y Justicia	Mar del Plata
17:00 UTC−3		Report	Molinas 4', 49'; Togni 25'; Miritello 68'; Osorio 84'	Stadium: Estadio José María Minella

3 February 2025 3	Defensa y Justicia	2–1	Central Córdoba	Gobernador Costa
17:00 UTC−3	Togni 65', 79'	Report	Angulo 63'	Stadium: Estadio Norberto "Tito" Tomaghello

9 February 2025 4	Deportivo Riestra	1–1	Defensa y Justicia	Buenos Aires
17:00 UTC−3	Herrera 90'		Cannavo 49'	Stadium: Estadio Guillermo Laza

12 February 2025 5	Newell's Old Boys	0–1	Defensa y Justicia	Rosario
19:15 UTC−3		Report	Miritello 90+3'	Stadium: Estadio Marcelo Bielsa

15 February 2025 6	Defensa y Justicia	1–1	Barracas Central	Gobernador Costa
17:00 UTC−3	Miritello 37'	Report	Insúa 90+9' (pen.)	Stadium: Estadio Norberto "Tito" Tomaghello

23 February 2025 7	Belgrano	2–0	Defensa y Justicia	Córdoba, Argentina
21:00 UTC−3	Fernández 38', 57'	Report		Stadium: El Gigante de Alberdi

4 March 2025 8	Platense	0–1	Defensa y Justicia	Florida
:00 UTC−3		Report	Miranda 11'	Stadium: Estadio Ciudad de Vicente López

9 March 2025 9	Defensa y Justicia	1–0	Estudiantes	Gobernador Costa
17:00 UTC−3	Togni 87'	Report		Stadium: Estadio Norberto "Tito" Tomaghello

16 March 2025 10	Boca Juniors	4–0	Defensa y Justicia	Buenos Aires
18:30 UTC−3	Cavani 9'; Giménez 32', 50'; Merentiel 81'	Report		Stadium: La Bombonera; Referee: Pablo Dóvalo

28 March 2025 11	Defensa y Justicia	1–2	Tigre	Gobernador Costa
17:00 UTC−3	Miritello 52'	Report	Paz 58'; Medina 79'	Stadium: Estadio Norberto "Tito" Tomaghello

6 April 2025 12	Argentinos Juniors	4–1	Defensa y Justicia	Buenos Aires
20:15 UTC−3	Viveros 6'; Lozano 13'; Molina 25'; Vega 32'		Osorio 53'	Stadium: Estadio Diego Armando Maradona

14 April 2025 13	Defensa y Justicia	0–0	Unión	Gobernador Costa
--:-- UTC−3		Report		Stadium: Estadio Norberto "Tito" Tomaghello

19 April 2025 14	Huracán	1–1	Defensa y Justicia	Buenos Aires
18:15 UTC−3	Lezcano 60'	Report	Ferreira 33'	Stadium: Estadio Tomás Adolfo Ducó

28 April 2025 15	Defensa y Justicia	1–2	Racing	Gobernador Costa
19:30 UTC−3	González 54'	Report	Salas 72'; Martirena 87'	Stadium: Estadio Norberto "Tito" Tomaghello

2 May 2025 16	Independiente Rivadavia	3–2	Defensa y Justicia	Mendoza
15:30 UTC−3	Gómez 18'; Cardillo 71'; Sartori 82'	Report	Pérez 35'; Togni 44'	Stadium: Estadio Bautista Gargantini

==== Torneo Clausura ====
===== League table =====
Pos	Team	Pld	W	D	L	GF	GA	GD	Pts
10	Belgrano	16	4	8	4	13	11	+2	20
11	Huracán	16	5	5	6	10	15	−5	20
12	Defensa y Justicia	16	5	4	7	14	19	−5	19
13	Aldosivi	16	5	3	8	13	18	−5	18
14	Independiente Rivadavia	16	3	7	6	14	17	−3	16

Source: AFA

===== Matches =====
14 July 2025 1	Banfield	0–0	Defensa y Justicia	Banfield
19:00 UTC−3		Report		Stadium: Estadio Florencio Sola

21 July 2025 2	Defensa y Justicia	2–0	Aldosivi	Gobernador Costa
21:15 UTC−3	Delgado 67'; Miritello 76'	Report		Stadium: Estadio Norberto "Tito" Tomaghello

28 July 2025 3	Central Córdoba	2–1	Defensa y Justicia	Santiago del Estero
18:00 UTC−3	Besozzi 10'; Verón 90+3'	Report	Pérez 54'	Stadium: Alfredo Terrera

11 August 2025 4	Defensa y Justicia	1–0	Deportivo Riestra	Gobernador Costa
19:00 UTC−3	Osorio 90+3'	Report		Stadium: Estadio Norberto "Tito" Tomaghello

14 August 2025 5	Defensa y Justicia	1–1	Newell's Old Boys	Gobernador Costa
14:00 UTC−3	Pérez 38'	Report	Mosquera 19'	Stadium: Estadio Norberto "Tito" Tomaghello

22 August 2025 6	Barracas Central	1–1	Defensa y Justicia	Buenos Aires
15:30 UTC−3	Tapia 90+6'	Report	Miritello 60'	Stadium: Estadio Claudio Chiqui Tapia

31 August 2025 7	Defensa y Justicia	2–1	Belgrano	Gobernador Costa
16:45 UTC−3	Delgado 8'; Miritello 75'	Report	Jara 30'	Stadium: Estadio Norberto "Tito" Tomaghello

14 September 2025 8	Defensa y Justicia	1–2	Platense	Gobernador Costa
20:00 UTC−3	Miritello 32'	Report	Schor 46'; Martínez 48'	Stadium: Estadio Norberto "Tito" Tomaghello; Referee: Juan Pafundi

22 September 2025 9	Estudiantes	1–0	Defensa y Justicia	La Plata
19:00 UTC−3	Delgado 76' (o.g.)	Report		Stadium: Estadio Jorge Luis Hirschi

=== Copa Argentina ===
19 February 2025 Round of 64	Defensa y Justicia	3–1	Racing de Córdoba	San Nicolás de los Arroyos
21:10 UTC−3	Balanta 17'; F. González 38'; C. Pérez 52'	Report	Perales 74'	Stadium: Único de San Nicolás; Referee: Pablo Giménez

22 May 2025 Round of 32	Defensa y Justicia	0–2	Newell's Old Boys	San Nicolás de los Arroyos
21:10		Report	Herrera 38'; Maroni 47'	Stadium: Único de San Nicolás; Referee: Pablo Dóvalo

=== Copa Sudamericana ===
==== Group Stage ====
Pos	Team	Pld	W	D	L	GF	GA	GD	Pts	Qualification	UCA	CRL	VIT	DYJ
1	(Ecuador) Universidad Católica	6	4	2	0	12	5	+7	14	Advance to round of 16	—	3–1	1–0	3–1
2	(Uruguay) Cerro Largo	6	2	1	3	5	8	−3	7	Advance to knockout round play-offs	1–3	—	0–1	0–0
3	(Brazil) Vitória	6	1	3	2	3	4	−1	6		1–1	0–1	—	1–1
4	(Argentina) Defensa y Justicia	6	0	4	2	4	7	−3	4		1–1	1–2	0–0	—

Source: CONMEBOL

3 April 2025 1	Cerro Largo (Uruguay)	0–0	(Argentina) Defensa y Justicia	Montevideo, Uruguay
21:30 UTC−3		Report		Stadium: Estadio Centenario (Note: Cerro Largo play their home matches at Estadio Centenario, Montevideo instead of their regular stadium Estadio Arquitecto Antonio Eleuterio Ubilla, Melo which did not meet CONMEBOL requirements for this stage.); Attendance: 569; Referee: Ivo Méndez (Bolivia)

10 April 2025 2	Defensa y Justicia (Argentina)	0–0	(Brazil) Vitória	Gobernador Costa
19:00 UTC−3		Report		Stadium: Estadio Norberto Tomaghello; Referee: Augusto Menéndez (Peru)

24 April 2025 3	Universidad Católica (Ecuador)	3–1	(Argentina) Defensa y Justicia	Quito, Ecuador
21:00 UTC−5	I. Díaz 9' (pen.), 80'; Moreno 70'	Report	Gutiérrez 14'	Stadium: Estadio Olímpico Atahualpa; Referee: Yender Herrera (Venezuela)

6 May 2025 4	Vitória (Brazil)	1–1	(Argentina) Defensa y Justicia	Salvador, Brazil
19:00 UTC−3	Edu 36'	Report	Togni 55'	Stadium: Barradão; Referee: Francisco Gilabert (Chile)

14 May 2025 5	Defensa y Justicia (Argentina)	1–1	(Ecuador) Universidad Católica	Gobernador Costa
19:00 UTC−3	Cannavo 45+1'	Report	Chancellor 58'	Stadium: Estadio Norberto Tomaghello; Referee: José Méndez (Paraguay)

28 May 2025 6	Defensa y Justicia (Argentina)	1–2	(Uruguay) Cerro Largo	Gobernador Costa
21:30 UTC−3	Barbona 67'	Report	Assís 45+1'; Otormín 51'	Stadium: Estadio Norberto Tomaghello; Referee: Emikar Calderas (Venezuela)
