= 2021 Recopa Sudamericana =

CONMEBOL Recopa Sudamericana 2021
Defensa y Justicia	Palmeiras
(Argentina)	(Brazil)
3	3
- Defensa y Justicia won 4–3 on penalties

First leg
Defensa y Justicia	Palmeiras
1	2
- Date: 7 April 2021
- Venue: Estadio Norberto "Tito" Tomaghello, Florencio Varela
- Referee: Andrés Rojas (Colombia)

Second leg
Palmeiras	Defensa y Justicia
1	2
- after extra time
- Date: 14 April 2021
- Venue: Estádio Nacional Mané Garrincha, Brasília
- Referee: Leodán González (Uruguay)

The 2021 CONMEBOL Recopa Sudamericana (Portuguese: CONMEBOL Recopa Sul-Americana de 2021) was the 29th edition of the CONMEBOL Recopa Sudamericana (also referred to as the Recopa Sudamericana), the football competition organized by CONMEBOL between the winners of the previous season's two major South American club tournaments, the Copa Libertadores and the Copa Sudamericana.

The competition was contested in two-legged home-and-away format between Brazilian team Palmeiras, the 2020 Copa Libertadores champions, and Argentine team Defensa y Justicia, the 2020 Copa Sudamericana champions. The first leg was hosted by Defensa y Justicia on 7 April 2021, while the second leg was hosted by Palmeiras on 14 April 2021. The matches were originally scheduled for 10 February 2021 and 3 March 2021, but were rescheduled due to the participation of Palmeiras in the 2020 FIFA Club World Cup.

Defensa y Justicia defeated Palmeiras 4-3 on penalties after tied 3-3 on aggregate to win their first Recopa Sudamericana.

== Teams ==
Team	Qualification	Previous appearances (bold indicates winners)
(Brazil) Palmeiras	2020 Copa Libertadores champions	None
(Argentina) Defensa y Justicia	2020 Copa Sudamericana champions	None

== Format ==
The Recopa Sudamericana was played on a home-and-away two-legged basis, with the Copa Libertadores champions hosting the second leg. If tied on aggregate, the away goals rule would not be used, and 30 minutes of extra time would be played. If still tied after extra time, the penalty shoot-out would be used to determine the winners (Regulations Article 17).

=== Relocation to Brasília ===
As a result of the COVID-19 pandemic in South America, the previous season's finals were postponed. This includes the 2020 Copa Libertadores and Copa Sudamericana final, which the CONMEBOL's Council moved to the Estádio do Dragão in Porto on 10 July 2020. At the same time, CONMEBOL postponed and relocated the second-leg matches to the Estádio Nacional Mané Garrincha in Brasília.

== Matches ==
=== First leg ===
7 April 2021
21:30 UTC−3

Defensa y Justicia (Argentina)	1–2	(Brazil) Palmeiras
Romero 58'	Report	Rony 16'; Gustavo Scarpa 75'

Estadio Norberto "Tito" Tomaghello, Florencio Varela
Referee: Andrés Rojas (Colombia)

**Defensa y Justicia**	**Palmeiras**

GK	22	(Argentina) Ezequiel Unsain (c)
RB	15	(Argentina) Matías Rodríguez	(yellow card) 90+6'
CB	2	(Argentina) Adonis Frías	(yellow card) 90+6'
CB	5	(Argentina) Fernando Meza	(yellow card) 54'
LB	3	(Argentina) Marcelo Benítez	(yellow card) 36'
RM	29	(Argentina) Francisco Pizzini		(substituted off) 69'
CM	30	(Colombia) Raúl Loaiza		(substituted off) 76'
CM	8	(Argentina) Enzo Fernández
LM	11	(Argentina) Carlos Rotondi		(substituted off) 76'
CF	31	(Argentina) Braian Romero
CF	7	(Argentina) Walter Bou
Substitutes:
GK	1	(Argentina) Marcos Ledesma
DF	4	(Argentina) Franco Paredes
DF	25	(Argentina) Néstor Breitenbruch
DF	28	(Argentina) Juan Gabriel Rodríguez
DF	33	(Argentina) Nahuel Gallardo
DF	37	(Argentina) Emanuel Brítez
MF	10	(Argentina) Tomás Martínez		(substituted on) 69'
MF	16	(Argentina) Lautaro Escalante		(substituted on) 76'
MF	35	(Argentina) Valentín Larralde
FW	9	(Uruguay) Miguel Merentiel
FW	12	(Argentina) Ciro Rius
FW	23	(Argentina) Eugenio Isnaldo		(substituted on) 76'
Manager:
(Argentina) Sebastián Beccacece

GK	21	(Brazil) Weverton
RB	2	(Brazil) Marcos Rocha
CB	13	(Brazil) Luan	(yellow card) 32'
CB	15	(Paraguay) Gustavo Gómez
LB	17	(Uruguay) Matías Viña	(yellow card) 84'
CM	30	(Brazil) Felipe Melo (c)		(substituted off) 63'
CM	8	(Brazil) Zé Rafael		(substituted off) 63'
RW	19	(Brazil) Breno Lopes		(substituted off) 80'
AM	23	(Brazil) Raphael Veiga		(substituted off) 59'
LW	29	(Brazil) Willian		(substituted off) 59'
CF	7	(Brazil) Rony
Substitutes:
GK	42	(Brazil) Jailson
DF	6	(Brazil) Lucas Esteves		(substituted on) 59'
DF	12	(Brazil) Mayke		(substituted on) 80'
DF	26	(Brazil) Victor Luis
DF	33	(Brazil) Alan Empereur
MF	5	(Brazil) Patrick de Paula	(yellow card) 79'	(substituted on) 63'
MF	14	(Brazil) Gustavo Scarpa	(yellow card) 88'	(substituted on) 59'
MF	20	(Brazil) Lucas Lima	(yellow card) 35'
MF	28	(Brazil) Danilo		(substituted on) 63'
FW	11	(Brazil) Wesley
FW	37	(Brazil) Rafael Papagaio
FW	41	(Brazil) Giovani
Manager:
(Portugal) Abel Ferreira

Assistant referees:
Alexander Guzmán (Colombia)
Jhon León (Colombia)
Fourth official:
Nicolás Gallo (Colombia)
Fifth official:
José Cuevas (Paraguay)
Video assistant referee:
Alexander Ospina (Colombia)
Assistant video assistant referees:
Éber Aquino (Paraguay)
Eduardo Cardozo (Paraguay)
Juan Benítez (Paraguay)

Match rules:

- 90 minutes.
- Twelve named substitutes, of which up to five may be used.

=== Second leg ===
Unsain (Defensa y Justicia) saved a penalty by Gómez (Palmeiras) in the 99th minute of extra time.

14 April 2021
21:30 UTC−3

Palmeiras (Brazil)	1–2 (a.e.t.)	(Argentina) Defensa y Justicia
Raphael Veiga 22' (pen.)	Report	Romero 30'; Benítez 90+3'
Penalties
Gabriel Menino (penalty scored); Luiz Adriano (penalty missed); Gómez (penalty scored); Rony (penalty scored); Weverton (penalty missed)	3–4	(penalty scored) Frías; (penalty scored) Merentiel; (penalty scored) Isnaldo; (penalty scored) Fernández

Estádio Nacional Mané Garrincha, Brasília (Note: The 2nd leg match, originally scheduled to be played at Allianz Parque, São Paulo, was rescheduled at Estádio Nacional Mané Garrincha, Brasília.)
Referee: Leodán González (Uruguay)

**Palmeiras**	**Defensa y Justicia**

GK	21	(Brazil) Weverton
RB	2	(Brazil) Marcos Rocha	(yellow card) 90+1'	(substituted off) 106'
CB	13	(Brazil) Luan
CB	15	(Paraguay) Gustavo Gómez (c)
LB	17	(Uruguay) Matías Viña	(red card) 68'
CM	5	(Brazil) Patrick de Paula	(yellow card) 82'	(substituted off) 83'
CM	28	(Brazil) Danilo
RW	11	(Brazil) Wesley	(yellow card) 59'	(substituted off) 63'
AM	23	(Brazil) Raphael Veiga		(substituted off) 77'
LW	19	(Brazil) Breno Lopes		(substituted off) 63'
CF	7	(Brazil) Rony	(yellow card) 110'
Substitutes:
GK	42	(Brazil) Jailson
DF	12	(Brazil) Mayke		(substituted on) 63'
DF	26	(Brazil) Victor Luis
DF	33	(Brazil) Alan Empereur			(substituted on) 83'
MF	8	(Brazil) Zé Rafael
MF	14	(Brazil) Gustavo Scarpa
MF	18	(Brazil) Danilo Barbosa
MF	25	(Brazil) Gabriel Menino		(substituted on) 77'
MF	30	(Brazil) Felipe Melo		(substituted on) 83'
FW	10	(Brazil) Luiz Adriano		(substituted on) 106'
FW	27	(Brazil) Gabriel Veron		(substituted on) 63'	(substituted off) 83'
FW	29	(Brazil) Willian
Manager:
(Portugal) Abel Ferreira

GK	22	(Argentina) Ezequiel Unsain (c)
RB	15	(Argentina) Matías Rodríguez		(substituted off) 106'
CB	2	(Argentina) Adonis Frías	(yellow card) 110'
CB	5	(Argentina) Fernando Meza
LB	3	(Argentina) Marcelo Benítez	(yellow card) 84'	(substituted off) 112'
RM	29	(Argentina) Francisco Pizzini		(substituted off) 85'
CM	30	(Colombia) Raúl Loaiza	(yellow card) 63'	(substituted off) 77'
CM	8	(Argentina) Enzo Fernández
LM	11	(Argentina) Carlos Rotondi		(substituted off) 80'
CF	31	(Argentina) Braian Romero	(red card) 98'
CF	7	(Argentina) Walter Bou		(substituted off) 106'
Substitutes:
GK	1	(Argentina) Marcos Ledesma
DF	25	(Argentina) Néstor Breitenbruch		(substituted on) 112'
DF	28	(Argentina) Juan Gabriel Rodríguez
DF	33	(Argentina) Nahuel Gallardo
DF	37	(Argentina) Emanuel Brítez		(substituted on) 106'
MF	10	(Argentina) Tomás Martínez
MF	16	(Argentina) Lautaro Escalante		(substituted on) 106'
MF	35	(Argentina) Valentín Larralde
FW	9	(Uruguay) Miguel Merentiel		(substituted on) 85'
FW	12	(Argentina) Ciro Rius
FW	19	(Argentina) Gabriel Hachen		(substituted on) 77'
FW	23	(Argentina) Eugenio Isnaldo		(substituted on) 80'
Manager:
(Argentina) Sebastián Beccacece				(yellow card) 32'

Assistant referees:
Nicolás Tarán (Uruguay)
Richard Trinidad (Uruguay)
Fourth official:
Andrés Matonte (Uruguay)
Fifth official:
Víctor Ráez (Peru)
Video assistant referee:
Julio Bascuñán (Chile)
Assistant video assistant referees:
Cristian Garay (Chile)
Christian Lescano (Ecuador)
Víctor Hugo Carrillo (Peru)

Match rules:

- 90 minutes.
- 30 minutes of extra time if tied on aggregate (away goals rule not applied).
- Penalty shoot-out if still tied on aggregate after extra time.
- Twelve named substitutes.
- Maximum of five substitutions, with a sixth allowed in extra time.

== See also ==
- 2020 Copa Libertadores Final
- 2020 Copa Sudamericana Final
