= Juan Miritello =

Argentine professional footballer

Personal information
- Full name: Juan Bautista Miritello
- Date of birth: 8 February 1999 (age 27)
- Place of birth: La Capilla, Argentina
- Height: 1.82 m (6 ft 0 in)
- Position: Forward

Team information
- Current team: Fortaleza (on loan from Defensa y Justicia)
- Number: 9

Youth career
- San Lorenzo de Luján
- Luján
- Independiente
- Defensa y Justicia

Senior career*
Years	Team	Apps	(Gls)
2019–	Defensa y Justicia	62	(15)
2020	→ Flandria (loan)	5	(1)
2020–2021	→ Real Pilar (loan)	8	(3)
2021	→ Talleres RE (loan)	33	(11)
2022–2023	→ San Martín T. (loan)	22	(9)
2023–2024	→ Asteras Tripolis (loan)	29	(13)
2026–	→ Fortaleza (loan)	4	(1)
- * Club domestic league appearances and goals as of 15 April 2026

Juan Bautista Miritello (born 8 February 1999) is an Argentine professional footballer who plays as a forward for Fortaleza on loan from Defensa y Justicia.

== Career ==
Miritello began his youth career in Luján with San Lorenzo, prior to having stints with Club Luján and Independiente. He soon departed to progress through the Defensa y Justicia youth ranks. He was promoted into senior football in October 2019 by manager Mariano Soso, who selected the forward as a substitute for a Primera División fixture with San Lorenzo. Miritello was subsequently subbed on for his professional debut, as he replaced Fernando Márquez with fourteen minutes remaining of a 3–1 win at the Estadio Pedro Bidegain on 30 October. Miritello spent the end of 2019–20 on loan in Primera B Metropolitana with Flandria.

Miritello scored his first senior goal, whilst with Flandria, on 29 February 2020 versus Fénix; in what was his penultimate match for the club due to the COVID-19 pandemic. In the following years, Miritello spent time on loan at clubs such as Real Pilar, Talleres RE and San Martín de Tucumán.

On 31 July 2023, Miritello joined Super League Greece club Asteras Tripolis on a season-long loan with an option to buy for the summer of 2024. In his second official appearance with the club, he scored his first goal in a comfortable 3–0 home win against OFI. On 24 September 2023, he helped his team take its first away win of the season with a 2–1 win over Volos.

== Career statistics ==
As of 23 September 2020.

Appearances and goals by club, season and competition
Club	Season	League			Cup		League Cup		Continental		Other		Total	
Club	Season	Division	Apps	Goals	Apps	Goals	Apps	Goals	Apps	Goals	Apps	Goals	Apps	Goals
Defensa y Justicia	2019–20	Primera División	1	0	0	0	0	0	0	0	0	0	1	0
Flandria (loan)	2019–20	Primera B Metropolitana	5	1	0	0	—		—		0	0	5	1
Career total			6	1	0	0	0	0	0	0	0	0	6	1
