= Nicolás Avellaneda (footballer) =

Argentine footballer

Personal information
- Full name: Nicolás Gastón Avellaneda
- Date of birth: 24 February 1993 (age 33)
- Place of birth: Río Tercero, Argentina
- Height: 1.91 m (6 ft 3 in)
- Position: Goalkeeper

Team information
- Current team: Unión La Calera

Youth career
- Lanús

Senior career*
Years	Team	Apps	(Gls)
2013–2017	Lanús	0	(0)
2018–2022	Defensa y Justicia	1	(0)
2020–2021	→ Ferro Carril Oeste (loan)	7	(0)
2021	→ Santamarina (loan)	28	(0)
2022	→ San Martín SJ (loan)	36	(0)
2023	San Luis	32	(0)
2024	Cobreloa	28	(0)
2025	Chacarita Juniors	29	(0)
2026–	Unión La Calera	0	(0)
- * Club domestic league appearances and goals as of 17:36, 13 June 2025 (UTC)

Nicolás Gastón Avellaneda (born 24 February 1993) is an Argentine professional footballer who plays as a goalkeeper for Chilean club Unión La Calera.

== Career ==
Avellaneda was promoted into the first-team squad of Lanús in 2013, appearing on the subs bench against Estudiantes on 19 June. He went unused, as Avellaneda did a further twenty-five times between then and the end of 2017. On 21 January 2018, fellow Primera División side Defensa y Justicia signed Avellaneda. He was on the bench for twelve fixtures in 2017–18, prior to eventually making his debut in Defensa's penultimate match of the season versus Newell's Old Boys on 5 May; due to the ineligibility of Ezequiel Unsain. He wouldn't appear again, despite appearing on the sidelines sixty-five times across two seasons.

Avellaneda spent the 2020 campaign on loan to Primera Nacional with Ferro Carril Oeste; initially planned to last until December 2021. His first appearance occurred on 12 December 2020 against Deportivo Morón, which preceded six further appearances for the club. On 18 February 2021, having cut short his time with Ferro, Avellaneda penned permanent terms with fellow second tier team Santamarina.

In December 2021, Avellaneda signed with San Martín de San Juan.

In 2023, he played for Chilean club San Luis de Quillota. The next season, he switched to Cobreloa, the recent promoted team to the top division.

On 30 December 2025, Avellaneda joined Unión La Calera from Chacarita Juniors.

== Career statistics ==
As of 19 February 2021.

Club statistics
Club	Season	League			Cup		League Cup		Continental		Other		Total	
Club	Season	Division	Apps	Goals	Apps	Goals	Apps	Goals	Apps	Goals	Apps	Goals	Apps	Goals
Lanús	2012–13	Primera División	0	0	0	0	—		—		0	0	0	0
Lanús	2013–14	Primera División	0	0	0	0	—		0	0	0	0	0	0
Lanús	2014	Primera División	0	0	0	0	—		0	0	0	0	0	0
Lanús	2015	Primera División	0	0	0	0	—		0	0	0	0	0	0
Lanús	2016	Primera División	0	0	0	0	—		—		0	0	0	0
Lanús	2016–17	Primera División	0	0	0	0	—		0	0	0	0	0	0
Lanús	2017–18	Primera División	0	0	0	0	—		0	0	0	0	0	0
Lanús	Total		0	0	0	0	—		0	0	0	0	0	0
Defensa y Justicia	2017–18	Primera División	1	0	0	0	—		0	0	0	0	1	0
Defensa y Justicia	2018–19	Primera División	0	0	0	0	0	0	0	0	0	0	0	0
Defensa y Justicia	2019–20	Primera División	0	0	0	0	0	0	0	0	0	0	0	0
Defensa y Justicia	2020–21	Primera División	0	0	0	0	0	0	0	0	0	0	0	0
Defensa y Justicia	Total		1	0	0	0	0	0	0	0	0	0	1	0
Ferro Carril Oeste (loan)	2020	Primera Nacional	7	0	0	0	—		—		0	0	7	0
Santamarina	2021	Primera Nacional	0	0	0	0	—		—		0	0	0	0
Career total			8	0	0	0	0	0	0	0	0	0	8	0

== Honours ==
Lanús

- Supercopa Argentina: 2016
