= DiFilm =

Private film archive

Archivo DiFilm
- Formation: 1949
- Founder: Roberto Di Chiara
- Type: Private archive
- Purpose: Film preservation and restoration
- Headquarters: Florencio Varela, Buenos Aires, Argentina
- Website: www.difilm-argentina.com

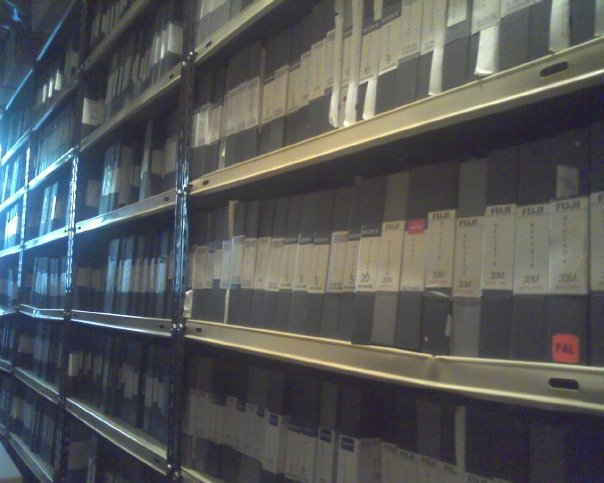
Betacam containing material from 1994 to 2007.

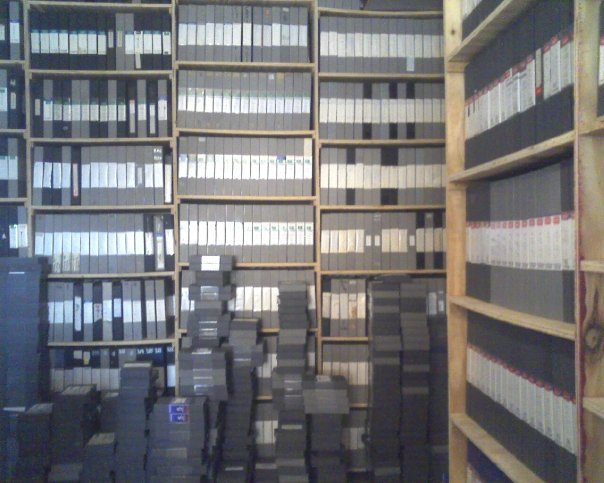
U-matic containing material from 1982 to 1999.

The DiFilm Archive (Spanish : Archivo DiFilm) is a private film archive founded by Roberto Di Chiara in 1949. It is dedicated to the preservation and restoration of 35 mm and 16 mm films, and also houses photos, magazines, and sound recordings. The main storage facilities are located in Florencio Varela, Buenos Aires.

It is the largest image bank in South America, and is also the most diverse private archive on the planet and the fourth most abundant (in general terms), only surpassed by the Library of Congress, and the archives of Germany and France. It holds seven million hours of film.

== History ==
DiFilm was founded in Florencio Varela, in 1949 by journalist and television producer Roberto Di Chiara.

The archive consists of—according to a 1999 article in Página 12—twenty-five thousand feature films in the original 35 or 16 mm format, fifty-two thousand newsreels from Argentina and around the world, thirty-four thousand radio broadcasts, With approximately six hundred thousand catalogued hours, Archivo DiFilm has 10% of its material catalogued and classified.

The main archive stores are located in Florencio Varela, where Roberto Di Chiara always wanted to create a museum dedicated to the film, either Argentine or Latin American.

On 14 May 2008, Roberto Di Chiara died, and his sons, Luis Mariano Di Chiara and Daniel, along with his grandson, Maximiliano Di Chiara, took over the management of the archive.

== See also ==
- Archivo General de la Nación
