= Nicolás Maná =

Argentine footballer

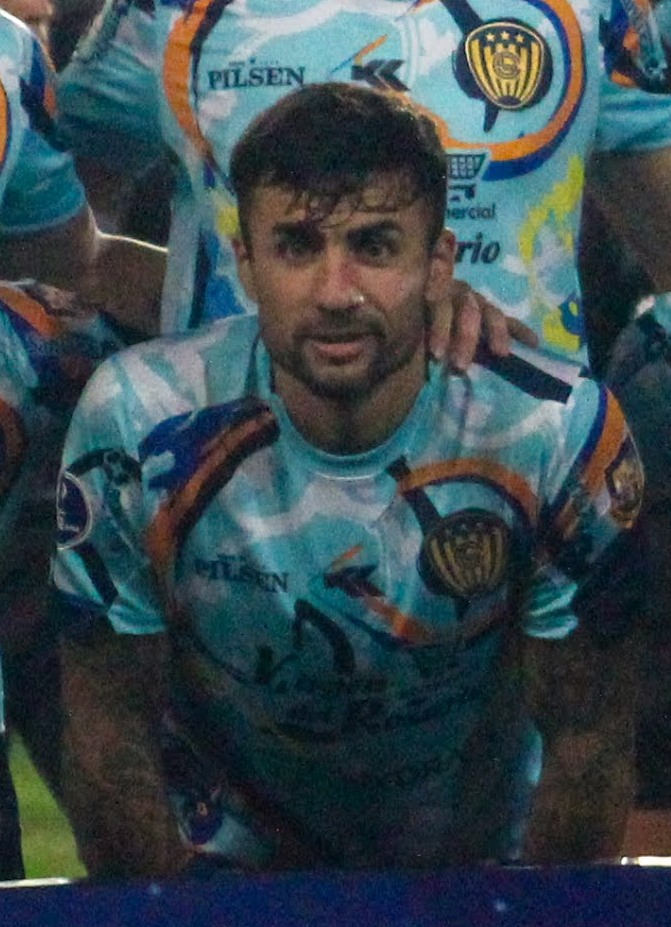
- Maná in 2024

Personal information
- Full name: Nicolás Andrés Maná
- Date of birth: 25 March 1994 (age 32)
- Place of birth: Piamonte, Argentina
- Height: 1.78 m (5 ft 10 in)
- Position: Right winger

Team information
- Current team: Deportivo Madryn
- Number: 9

Youth career
- Boca Juniors

Senior career*
Years	Team	Apps	(Gls)
2013–2016	Boca Juniors	0	(0)
2015	→ Univ. San Martín (loan)	26	(1)
2016–2018	Cañuelas	0	(0)
2016–2018	→ San Martín SJ (loan)	36	(2)
2018–2019	Panetolikos	27	(3)
2019–2021	Defensa y Justicia	8	(0)
2020–2021	→ Guaraní (loan)	40	(3)
2021	→ Vila Nova (loan)	8	(0)
2022	Sol de América	15	(0)
2022	Montevideo Wanderers	12	(2)
2023	Sportivo Trinidense	40	(6)
2024	Sportivo Luqueño	42	(5)
2025	General Caballero JLM	11	(0)
2025–	Deportivo Madryn	5	(1)
- * Club domestic league appearances and goals as of 17:34, 3 August 2025 (UTC)

Nicolás Andrés Maná (born 25 March 1994) is an Argentine professional footballer who plays as a right winger for Argentinian club Deportivo Madryn .

== Career ==
Boca Juniors were Maná's first senior club, he remained with them for three years but didn't make a first-team appearance; though was an unused substitute on two occasions during the 2012–13 Argentine Primera División season. In January 2015, Peruvian Primera División side Universidad San Martín loaned Maná. He made his debut during a Copa Inca fixture with Juan Aurich on 7 February. His first league appearance arrived on 2 May versus FBC Melgar, which was followed by his first goal against Ayacucho in November 2015. In all competitions, Maná featured thirty-seven times for the club.

Maná signed for Primera C Metropolitana's Cañuelas in June 2016, but was immediately signed on loan by San Martín of the Argentine Primera División. He netted his opening goal in the Argentine top-flight on 27 May 2017 in a 4–2 victory over Sarmiento. 2018 saw Maná leave San Martín following two seasons on loan, returning to Cañuelas though immediately departing the club permanently to join Super League Greece side Panetolikos. He scored his first goal in a draw against Lamia on 24 September, prior to netting a brace in a game against Atromitos months later. He was released in May 2019.

On 1 July 2019, Maná moved to Defensa y Justicia on a free transfer. After a few loan spells and a total of nine appearances for Defensa, Maná left the club at the end of 2021 and then joined Paraguayan club Sol de América in January 2022. On 29 July 2022, Maná joined Uruguayan club Montevideo Wanderers.

== Career statistics ==
As of 2 July 2019.

Club statistics
Club	Season	League			Cup		League Cup		Continental		Other		Total	
Club	Season	Division	Apps	Goals	Apps	Goals	Apps	Goals	Apps	Goals	Apps	Goals	Apps	Goals
Boca Juniors	2012–13	Argentine Primera División	0	0	0	0	—		0	0	0	0	0	0
Boca Juniors	2013–14	Argentine Primera División	0	0	0	0	—		0	0	0	0	0	0
Boca Juniors	2014	Argentine Primera División	0	0	0	0	—		0	0	0	0	0	0
Boca Juniors	2015	Argentine Primera División	0	0	0	0	—		0	0	0	0	0	0
Boca Juniors	2016	Argentine Primera División	0	0	0	0	—		0	0	0	0	0	0
Boca Juniors	Total		0	0	0	0	—		0	0	0	0	0	0
Universidad San Martín (loan)	2015	Peruvian Primera División	26	1	11	0	—		—		0	0	37	1
Cañuelas	2016–17	Primera C Metropolitana	0	0	0	0	—		—		0	0	0	0
Cañuelas	2017–18	Primera C Metropolitana	0	0	0	0	—		—		0	0	0	0
Cañuelas	Total		0	0	0	0	—		—		0	0	0	0
San Martín (loan)	2016–17	Argentine Primera División	17	1	1	0	—		—		0	0	18	1
San Martín (loan)	2017–18	Argentine Primera División	19	1	0	0	—		—		0	0	19	1
San Martín (loan)	Total		36	2	1	0	—		—		0	0	37	2
Panetolikos	2018–19	Super League Greece	27	3	3	0	—		—		0	0	30	3
Defensa y Justicia	2019–20	Primera División	0	0	0	0	0	0	0	0	0	0	0	0
Career total			89	6	15	0	0	0	0	0	0	0	104	6
