= Bautista Merlini =

Argentine footballer

Personal information
- Full name: Bautista Merlini
- Date of birth: 4 July 1995 (age 31)
- Place of birth: Vicente López, Argentina
- Height: 1.79 m (5 ft 10 in)
- Position: Left winger

Team information
- Current team: Platense
- Number: 18

Youth career
- –2016: Platense

Senior career*
Years	Team	Apps	(Gls)
2013	Platense	2	(0)
2016–2021	San Lorenzo	29	(2)
2019	→ Defensa y Justicia (loan)	14	(1)
2020	→ Guaraní (loan)	33	(1)
2021–2025	Libertad	78	(12)
2025–2026	Gimnasia LP	26	(1)
2026–	Platense	26	(3)
- * Club domestic league appearances and goals as of 17:12, 22 November 2026 (UTC)

Bautista Merlini (born 4 July 1995) is an Argentine footballer who plays as a left winger for Platense.

== Career statistics ==
As of 11 March 2019

Appearances and goals by club, season and competition
Club	Season	League			Cup		League Cup		Other		Total	
Club	Season	Division	Apps	Goals	Apps	Goals	Apps	Goals	Apps	Goals	Apps	Goals
Platense	2012–13	Primera B Metropolitana	2	0	1	0	—				3	0
San Lorenzo	2016–17	Argentine Primera División	20	2	0	0	—		13 (Note: Appearance(s) in the Torneos de Verano, Copa Sudamericana & Copa Libertadores)	1	33	3
San Lorenzo	2017–18	Argentine Primera División	3	0	2	0	—		4 (Note: Appearance(s) in the Copa Libertadores)	0	9	0
San Lorenzo	2018–19	Argentine Primera División	6	0	1	0	—		3 (Note: Appearance(s) in the Copa Sudamericana)	0	10	0
San Lorenzo	Total		29	2	3	0	0	0	20	1	52	3
Defensa y Justicia (loan)	2018–19	Argentine Primera División	1	0	0	0	—		1	0	2	0
Career totals			32	2	4	0	0	0	21	1	57	3
