= Abiel Osorio =

Argentine association football player

Personal information
- Full name: Abiel Alessio Osorio
- Date of birth: 13 June 2002 (age 24)
- Place of birth: San Nicolás de los Arroyos, Argentina
- Height: 1.82 m (6 ft 0 in)
- Position: Forward

Team information
- Current team: Elche

Youth career
- 2010–2021: Vélez Sarsfield

Senior career*
Years	Team	Apps	(Gls)
2021–2024	Vélez Sarsfield	71	(9)
2024–2026	Defensa y Justicia	49	(10)
2026–	Elche	0	(0)
2026	→ Defensa y Justicia (loan)	4	(0)
- * Club domestic league appearances and goals as of 17:24, 1 December 2025 (UTC)

Abiel Alessio Osorio (born 13 June 2002) is an Argentine professional footballer who plays for Spanish club Elche.

== Career ==
=== Vélez Sarsfield ===
Osorio joined Velez Sarsfield at the age of 13, and signed his first professional contract with the club in July 2021, agreeing a two-year deal. The following season he made his first team debut, on 6 March 2022, in the Copa de la Liga Profesional against Estudiantes de La Plata. The next month he scored his first professional goal, on his first professional start, on 8 May 2022, in a 2–1 victory against Colón.

Osorio later extended his contract with the club until the end of 2024. Due to the sexual abuse complaints, his contract with Vélez was terminated in April 2024.

=== Defensa y Justicia ===
On 14 July 2024, Osorio joined Defensa y Justicia. He immediately became a starter for his new side.

=== Elche ===
On 11 January 2026, shortly after being cleared of his accusations, Osorio signed a three-and-a-half-year contract with La Liga side Elche, being loaned back to Defensa y Justicia until June.

== International career ==
In August 2023, he was called up to the Argentina national under-23 football team by coach Javier Mascherano.

== Style of play ==
Osorio has been described as having the physical strength that makes him capable of winning duels. This, combined with his good ball retention makes him a difficult striker to mark and helps him to become a reference point for his side's attacking play.

== Personal life ==
Osorio is the nephew of former professional footballer, Aldo Osorio. He has earned the nickname ‘El Tanque’ due to his physicality.

In February 2024, Osorio and three other Vélez players (Sebastián Sosa, Braian Cufré and José Florentín) were accused of sexual assault, and were subsequently separated from the first team squad. In December 2025, a judge ruled in favor of the players, stating that the "conduct of the accused does not constitute criminal offense". In May 2026, however, the case was reopened after an appeal was accepted by the Court of Appeals.
