= Ezequiel Cannavo =

Argentine footballer

Personal information
- Full name: Ezequiel Cannavo
- Date of birth: 12 June 2002 (age 24)
- Place of birth: Rosario, Argentina
- Height: 1.78 m (5 ft 10 in)
- Position: Right-back

Team information
- Current team: Racing Club (on loan from Defensa y Justicia)
- Number: 4

Youth career
- Defensa y Justicia

Senior career*
| Years | Team | Apps | (Gls) |
| 2023– | Defensa y Justicia | 53 | (3) |
| 2026– | → Racing Club (loan) | 28 | (1) |
- * Club domestic league appearances and goals as of 18:01, 8 November 2026 (UTC)

Ezequiel Cannavo (born 12 June 2002) is an Argentine professional footballer who plays as a right-back for Racing Club, on loan from Defensa y Justicia.

== Club career ==
=== Defensa y Justicia ===
Cannavo came through the youth setup at Defensa y Justicia and signed his first professional contract on 25 January 2023, signing for 4 years. He made his debut for the first team on 8 October that year in a 2–0 win against Lanús in the Copa de la Liga Profesional. He scored his first goal against San Lorenzo on 7 April 2024. He featured in the Copa Sudamericana and scored his first goal in continental competition on 14 May 2025 in a 1–1 draw against Ecuadorian club Universidad Católica.

==== Loan to Racing Club ====
In February 2026, he joined Racing Club on a one-year deal with an option to buy. He made his debut for the club in a 2–1 win against Argentinos Juniors. He scored his first goal for the club in the reverse fixture on 9 August.

== Career statistics ==
As of 1 September 2026

Appearances and goals by club, season and competition
| Club | Season | League | | | Cup (Note: Includes Copa Argentina) | | Continental | | Other | | Total | |
| Club | Season | Division | Goals | Apps | Apps | Goals | Apps | Goals | Apps | Goals | Apps | Goals |
|---|---|---|---|---|---|---|---|---|---|---|---|---|
| Defensa y Justicia | 2023 | Liga Profesional | 1 | 0 | — | | — | | — | | 1 | 0 |
| Defensa y Justicia | 2024 | Liga Profesional | 26 | 2 | — | | 5 (Note: Appearance(s) in Copa Sudamericana) | 0 | — | | 31 | 2 |
| Defensa y Justicia | 2025 | Liga Profesional | 26 | 1 | 1 | 0 | 5 | 1 | — | | 32 | 2 |
| Defensa y Justicia | Total | | 53 | 3 | 1 | 0 | 10 | 1 | 0 | 0 | 64 | 4 |
| Racing Club (loan) | 2026 | Liga Profesional | 20 | 1 | 3 | 0 | 3 | 0 | — | | 26 | 1 |
| Career total | | | 73 | 4 | 4 | 0 | 13 | 1 | 0 | 0 | 90 | 5 |
