= Valentín Larralde =

Argentine footballer

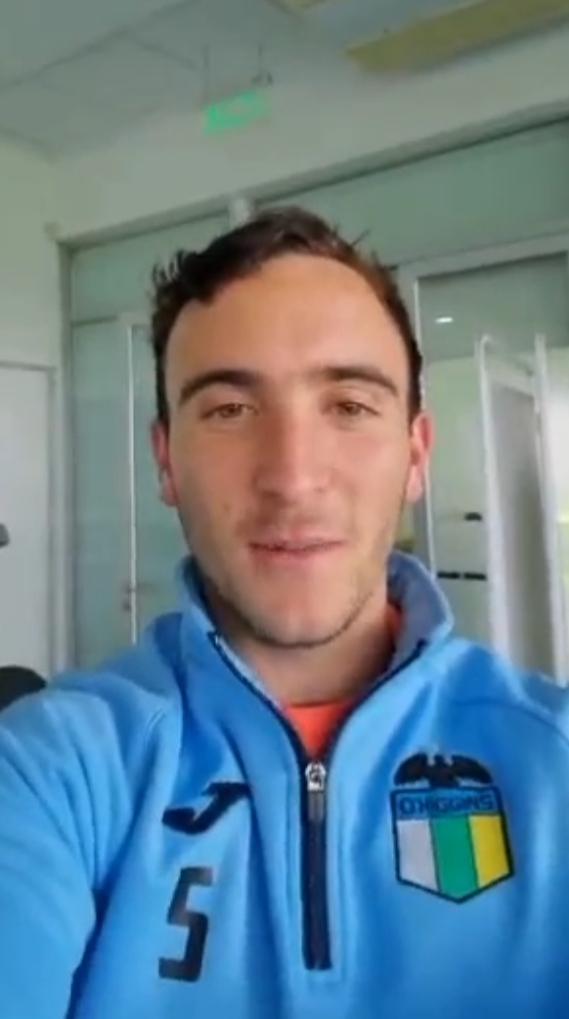

Personal information
- Full name: Larralde with O'Higgins in 2023.
- Date of birth: 15 November 2000 (age 25)
- Place of birth: El Pato, Argentina
- Height: 1.70 m (5 ft 7 in)
- Position: Midfielder

Youth career
- Independiente
- 2009–2018: Gimnasia y Esgrima
- 2018–2020: Defensa y Justicia

Senior career*
Years	Team	Apps	(Gls)
2020–2025	Defensa y Justicia	14	(0)
2021	→ Arsenal Sarandí (loan)	12	(0)
2022	→ San Martín Tucumán (loan)	33	(1)
2023	→ O'Higgins (loan)	15	(0)
2024	→ Gimnasia Jujuy (loan)	10	(0)
2024	→ Aldosivi (loan)	15	(0)
- * Club domestic league appearances and goals as of 17:28, 18 July 2025 (UTC)

Valentín Larralde (born 15 November 2000) is an Argentine professional footballer who plays as a midfielder.

== Career ==
Larralde spent his embryonic years with a local team in El Pato, which preceded a two-year stint with Independiente and subsequently Gimnasia y Esgrima. In 2018, Larralde joined Defensa y Justicia. 2020 saw the central midfielder move into Hernán Crespo's first-team. He was initially an unused substitute for Copa Libertadores group stage wins over Delfín and Olimpia, before making his senior debut in the away match with Delfín on 1 October 2020; coming on for the final ten minutes of a three-goal defeat. Larralde signed his first professional contract a week later.

In June 2021, Larralde was loaned out to Arsenal Sarandí for the rest of 2021. After returning from the spell, he was loaned out again, this time to San Martín de Tucumán until the end of 2022.

In 2023, he was loaned to Chilean side O'Higgins.

== Career statistics ==
As of 22 November 2020.

Appearances and goals by club, season and competition
Club	Season	League			Cup		League Cup		Continental		Other		Total	
Club	Season	Division	Apps	Goals	Apps	Goals	Apps	Goals	Apps	Goals	Apps	Goals	Apps	Goals
Defensa y Justicia	2020–21 (Note: Soccerway counts Copa de la Liga Profesional appearances as league appearances.)	Primera División	1	0	0	0	0	0	1 (Note: Appearance(s) in the Copa Sudamericana)	0	0	0	2	0
Career total			1	0	0	0	0	0	1	0	0	0	2	0
