= Enzo Coacci =

Argentine professional footballer

Personal information
- Full name: Enzo Gabriel Coacci
- Date of birth: 9 August 1998 (age 28)
- Place of birth: Bahía Blanca, Argentina
- Height: 1.69 m (5 ft 7 in)
- Positions: Winger; midfielder

Team information
- Current team: Olimpo

Youth career
- Olimpo

Senior career*
| Years | Team | Apps | (Gls) |
| 2018–2019 | Olimpo | 7 | (1) |
| 2019–2023 | Defensa y Justicia | 10 | (0) |
| 2021 | → Estudiantes BA (loan) | 19 | (0) |
| 2022 | → Chacarita Juniors (loan) | 2 | (0) |
| 2022 | → Estudiantes RC (loan) | 12 | (0) |
| 2023 | Temperley | 16 | (1) |
| 2023– | Olimpo | 68 | (8) |
- * Club domestic league appearances and goals as of 16:51, 14 April 2026 (UTC)

Enzo Gabriel Coacci (born 9 August 1998) is an Argentine professional footballer who plays as a winger or midfielder for Olimpo.

== Career ==
Coacci's career got underway with Olimpo of Primera B Nacional. The 2018–19 season saw the midfielder join the club's first-team, with Coacci initially being an unused substitute for a Copa Argentina match against Aldosivi on 20 July. Nine days later, in the round of thirty-two, Coacci featured for twenty-eight minutes of a 1–0 defeat to Gimnasia y Esgrima. His league debut arrived in the following November in a loss to Platense.

After a loan spell at Estudiantes de Buenos Aires in 2021, Coacci joined Chacarita Juniors in February 2022 on a loan deal until the end of the year. The spell was terminated before time and Coacci was instead loaned out to Estudiantes de Río Cuarto in June 2022 until the end of the year.

== Career statistics ==
As of 2 March 2019.

Appearances and goals by club, season and competition
| Club | Season | League | | | Cup | | Continental | | Other | | Total | |
| Club | Season | Division | Apps | Goals | Apps | Goals | Apps | Goals | Apps | Goals | Apps | Goals |
|---|---|---|---|---|---|---|---|---|---|---|---|---|
| Olimpo | 2018–19 | Primera B Nacional | 2 | 0 | 1 | 0 | — | | 0 | 0 | 3 | 0 |
| Career total | | | 2 | 0 | 1 | 0 | — | | 0 | 0 | 3 | 0 |

== Honours ==
- Copa Sudamericana: 2020
