= Aldo Maiz =

Paraguayan footballer (born 2000)

Personal information
- Full name: Aldo Agustín Maiz Gill
- Date of birth: 27 August 2000 (age 26)
- Place of birth: San Lorenzo, Paraguay
- Height: 1.72 m (5 ft 8 in)
- Position: Midfielder

Team information
- Current team: Guaraní (on loan from Defensa y Justicia)
- Number: 8

Youth career
- General Díaz

Senior career*
| Years | Team | Apps | (Gls) |
| 2018–2019 | General Díaz | 40 | (1) |
| 2019– | Defensa y Justicia | 0 | (0) |
| 2020–2021 | → Cerro Porteño (loan) | 7 | (0) |
| 2022–2024 | → Sportivo Ameliano (loan) | 80 | (2) |
| 2025– | → Guaraní (loan) | 18 | (0) |
- * Club domestic league appearances and goals as of 1 June 2025

Aldo Agustín Maiz Gill (born 27 August 2000) is a Paraguayan professional footballer who plays as a midfielder for Guaraní on loan from Argentine club Defensa y Justicia.

== Career ==
Maiz started off his career in his homeland with General Díaz. He made his professional bow, at the age of seventeen, in a Primera División fixture with Olimpia on 12 February 2018, though was substituted off after thirty-four minutes for Arturo Aranda. Four days later, Maiz started another match against Independiente but was again subbed off early in the first half. In the succeeding November, Maiz scored his first senior goal in a victory away from home to Guaraní. Across the 2018 campaign, Maiz was selected to start nineteen times; appearing for the full duration just once. He featured in twenty-one matches in the first part of 2019.

On 27 July 2019, Argentine Primera División side Defensa y Justicia announced the signing of Maiz. On 5 November 2020, Maiz was loaned out to Cerro Porteño until July 2021. In February 2022, he moved on loan to Sportivo Ameliano until the end of the year.

== Career statistics ==
As of 27 July 2019.

Appearances and goals by club, season and competition
| Club | Season | League | | | Cup | | League Cup | | Continental | | Other | | Total | |
| Club | Season | Division | Apps | Goals | Apps | Goals | Apps | Goals | Apps | Goals | Apps | Goals | Apps | Goals |
|---|---|---|---|---|---|---|---|---|---|---|---|---|---|---|
| General Díaz | 2018 | Paraguayan Primera División | 19 | 1 | 0 | 0 | — | | 0 | 0 | 0 | 0 | 19 | 1 |
| General Díaz | 2019 | Paraguayan Primera División | 21 | 0 | 0 | 0 | — | | — | | 0 | 0 | 21 | 0 |
| General Díaz | Total | | 40 | 1 | 0 | 0 | — | | 0 | 0 | 0 | 0 | 40 | 1 |
| Defensa y Justicia | 2019–20 | Argentine Primera División | 0 | 0 | 0 | 0 | 0 | 0 | 0 | 0 | 0 | 0 | 0 | 0 |
| Career total | | | 40 | 1 | 0 | 0 | 0 | 0 | 0 | 0 | 0 | 0 | 40 | 1 |
