= Lucas Ferreira =

Lucas Ferreira may refer to:

- Lucas Ferreira (Brazilian footballer) (born 2006), Brazilian football attacking midfielder for Shakhtar Donetsk
- Lucas Ferreira (Portuguese footballer) (born 2006), Portuguese football attacking midfielder for Servette
