= Ezequiel Unsain =

Argentine footballer

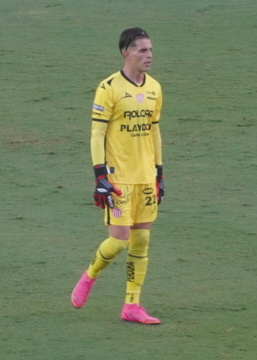
- Unsain with Necaxa in 2025

Personal information
- Full name: Luis Ezequiel Unsain
- Date of birth: 9 March 1995 (age 31)
- Place of birth: Villa Alcaraz, Argentina
- Height: 1.88 m (6 ft 2 in)
- Position: Goalkeeper

Team information
- Current team: Talleres

Youth career
- Unión de Alcaraz
- 2008–2015: Newell's Old Boys

Senior career*
Years	Team	Apps	(Gls)
2015–2017	Newell's Old Boys	16	(0)
2017–2023	Defensa y Justicia	167	(0)
2023–2026	Necaxa	97	(0)
2026–	Talleres	16	(0)
- * Club domestic league appearances and goals as of 17:45, 15 November 2026 (UTC)

Luis Ezequiel Unsain (born 9 March 1995) is an Argentine professional footballer who plays as a goalkeeper for AFA Liga Profesional de Fútbol club Talleres.

== Career ==
Unsain started his career in 2015 with Argentine Primera División team Newell's Old Boys, after youth spells with them and Union de Alcaraz. He was an unused substitute seven times during 2015 prior to making his professional debut on 16 August in a 0–0 draw at home to Temperley. Fifteen appearances followed during 2015 and 2016. In the middle of 2016–17, on 8 March, Unsain departed Newell's to join fellow Primera División side Defensa y Justicia. In 2016–17, Unsain was an unused substitute twenty-six times for Newell's and Defensa. His Defensa debut arrived in May 2017 in a Copa Argentina victory at home to Sol de Mayo. On 30 June 2023 he joined Mexican side Necaxa.

== Career statistics ==
As of 27 June 2026.

Club statistics
Club	Season	League			Cup		League Cup		Continental (Note: Includes Copa Sudamericana, Copa Libertadores, and Leagues Cup.)		Other (Note: Includes Recopa Sudamericana)		Total	
Club	Season	Division	Apps	Goals	Apps	Goals	Apps	Goals	Apps	Goals	Apps	Goals	Apps	Goals
Newell's Old Boys	2015	Primera División	12	0	0	0	—		—		0	0	12	0
Newell's Old Boys	2016	Primera División	4	0	0	0	—		—		0	0	4	0
Newell's Old Boys	2016–17	Primera División	0	0	0	0	—		—		0	0	0	0
Newell's Old Boys	Total		16	0	0	0	—		—		0	0	16	0
Defensa y Justicia	2016–17	Primera División	0	0	1	0	—		0	0	0	0	1	0
Defensa y Justicia	2017–18	Primera División	15	0	2	0	—		8	0	0	0	17	0
Defensa y Justicia	2018–19	Primera División	25	0	2	0	2	0	2	0	—		31	0
Defensa y Justicia	2019–20	Primera División	23	0	3	0	1	0	6	0	—		34	0
Defensa y Justicia	2020–21	Primera División	4	0	3	0	—		9	0	—		16	0
Defensa y Justicia	2021	Primera División	37	0	0	0	—		8	0	2	0	47	0
Defensa y Justicia	2022	Primera División	42	0	3	0	—		5	0	—		50	0
Defensa y Justicia	2023	Primera División	21	0	1	0	—		6	0	—		28	0
Defensa y Justicia	Total		167	0	15	0	3	0	44	0	2	0	231	0
Necaxa	2023–24	Liga MX	27	0	—		—		—		—		27	0
Necaxa	2024–25	Liga MX	36	0	—		—		3	0	—		39	0
Necaxa	2025–26	Liga MX	34	0	—		—		3	0	—		37	0
Necaxa	Total		97	0	—		—		6	0	—		103	0
Career total			280	0	15	0	3	0	50	0	2	0	350	0
