= Lautaro Escalante =

Argentine footballer

Personal information
- Full name: Lautaro Tomás Escalante
- Date of birth: 2 July 1999 (age 27)
- Place of birth: Florencio Varela, Argentina
- Height: 1.70 m (5 ft 7 in)
- Position: Midfielder

Team information
- Current team: Plaza Colonia

Youth career
- Defensa y Justicia

Senior career*
Years	Team	Apps	(Gls)
2020–2026	Defensa y Justicia	52	(1)
2022	→ San Martín T. (loan)	14	(0)
2024–2025	→ San Martín SJ (loan)	41	(0)
2026–	Plaza Colonia	5	(1)
- * Club domestic league appearances and goals as of 16:51, 4 October 2026 (UTC)

Lautaro Tomás Escalante (born 2 July 1999) is an Argentine professional footballer who plays as a midfielder for Plaza Colonia.

== Professional career ==
Escalante made his professional debut with Defensa y Justicia in a 4-1 Argentine Primera División win over Talleres de Córdoba on 26 January 2020.

In February 2022, Escalante was loaned out to Primera Nacional club San Martín Tucumán until the end of 2022. However, he was recalled by Defensa on 6 July 2022.

== Career statistics ==
As of match played on 12 April 2023

Club statistics
Club	Season	League			National Cup		Other		Total	
Club	Season	Division	Apps	Goals	Apps	Goals	Apps	Goals	Apps	Goals
Defensa y Justicia	2019–20	Argentine Primera División	1	0	2	0	8 (Note: Five appearances in the Copa de la Liga Profesional and Three appearances in the Copa Sudamericana)	0	11	0
Defensa y Justicia	2021	Argentine Primera División	9	0	0	0	14 (Note: Six appearances in the Copa de la Liga Profesional, Six appearances in the Copa Libertadores and Two appearances in the Recopa Sudamericana)	1	23	1
Defensa y Justicia	2022	Argentine Primera División	5	0	0	0	—		5	0
Defensa y Justicia	2023	Argentine Primera División	9	0	1	0	1 (Note: Appearance in the Copa Sudamericana)	0	11	0
Defensa y Justicia	Defensa y Justicia totals		24	0	3	0	23	1	50	1
San Martín (T) (loan)	2021	Primera Nacional	14	0	0	0	—		14	0
Career totals			38	0	3	0	23	1	64	1
