= Rafael Delgado (footballer) =

Argentine footballer (born 1990)

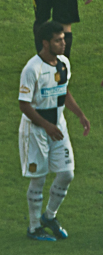
- Delgado with Rosario Central in 2013

Personal information
- Full name: Rafael Marcelo Delgado
- Date of birth: 13 January 1990 (age 36)
- Place of birth: Reconquista, Argentina
- Height: 1.78 m (5 ft 10 in)
- Position: Left-back

Team information
- Current team: Deportes La Serena
- Number: 33

Youth career
- Rosario Central

Senior career*
Years	Team	Apps	(Gls)
2011–2014	Rosario Central	96	(4)
2015	Estudiantes	4	(0)
2015–2020	Defensa y Justicia	104	(4)
2018	→ Atlético Nacional (loan)	11	(0)
2020–2023	Colón	90	(2)
2021	→ Defensa y Justicia (loan)	–	(–)
2024–2025	Belgrano	21	(0)
2025	Defensa y Justicia	21	(2)
2026–	Deportes La Serena	1	(0)
- * Club domestic league appearances and goals as of 2 February 2026

Rafael Marcelo Delgado (born 13 January 1990) is an Argentine professional footballer who plays as a left-back for Chilean club Deportes La Serena.

== Career ==
Delgado began with Rosario Central in 2011. He scored on his professional career debut on 4 April, netting the opening goal in a 3–0 win over Ferro Carril Oeste in Primera B Nacional. In his first three seasons, Delgado scored two goals in fifty-two matches including twenty-eight appearances during 2012–13 which ended with promotion to the Argentine Primera División. He went onto score twice in forty-four games in the top-flight. In January 2015, Delgado joined Estudiantes. He made his debut on 9 March versus San Lorenzo, prior to making three further appearances during the 2015 Argentine Primera División campaign.

On 1 July 2015, seven months after arriving, Delgado departed Estudiantes to sign for Defensa y Justicia. He scored his first goal for Defensa in April 2016 during a 3–1 defeat to Atlético Tucumán. After sixty-six appearances and one goal in his first four seasons with Defensa y Justicia, Delgado left the club on loan in February 2018 to join Categoría Primera A side Atlético Nacional. Fourteen appearances in all competitions later, Delgado returned to Defensa y Justicia and subsequently made his 200th career appearance in the Primera División against Independiente on 24 August.

In January 2026, Delgado moved to Chile and signed with Deportes La Serena.

== Career statistics ==
As of 6 September 2018.

Club statistics
Club	Season	League			Cup (Note: Includes the Copa Argentina and Copa Colombia)		League Cup		Continental (Note: Includes the Copa Libertadores and Copa Sudamericana)		Other		Total	
Club	Season	Division	Apps	Goals	Apps	Goals	Apps	Goals	Apps	Goals	Apps	Goals	Apps	Goals
Rosario Central	2010–11	Primera B Nacional	11	2	0	0	—		—		0	0	11	2
Rosario Central	2011–12	Primera B Nacional	13	0	0	0	—		—		0	0	13	0
Rosario Central	2012–13	Primera B Nacional	28	0	1	0	—		—		0	0	29	0
Rosario Central	2013–14	Primera División	30	0	0	0	—		—		0	0	30	0
Rosario Central	2014	Primera División	14	2	5	0	—		2 (Note: Two appearances in 2014 Copa Sudamericana)	0	0	0	21	2
Rosario Central	Total		96	4	6	0	—		2	0	0	0	104	4
Estudiantes	2015	Primera División	4	0	0	0	—		0	0	0	0	4	0
Defensa y Justicia	2015	Primera División	14	0	1	0	—		—		0	0	15	0
Defensa y Justicia	2016	Primera División	15	1	1	0	—		—		0	0	16	1
Defensa y Justicia	2016–17	Primera División	24	0	1	0	—		3 (Note: Three appearances in 2017 Copa Sudamericana)	0	0	0	28	0
Defensa y Justicia	2017–18	Primera División	13	0	2	0	—		1 (Note: One appearances in 2017 Copa Sudamericana)	0	0	0	16	0
Defensa y Justicia	2018–19	Primera División	1	0	1	0	—		0	0	0	0	2	0
Defensa y Justicia	Total		67	1	6	0	—		4	0	0	0	68	1
Atlético Nacional (loan)	2018	Categoría Primera A	9	0	0	0	—		4 (Note: Four appearances in 2018 Copa Libertadores)	0	2 (Note: Two appearances in 2018 Categoría Primera A play-offs)	0	15	0
Career total			176	5	12	0	—		10	0	2	0	200	5

== Honours ==
Rosario Central

- Primera B Nacional: 2012–13
