= Estadio Norberto "Tito" Tomaghello =

Football stadium in Gobernador Costa, Argentina

Norberto 'Tito' Tomaghello Stadium
- Estadio Norberto 'Tito' Tomaghello

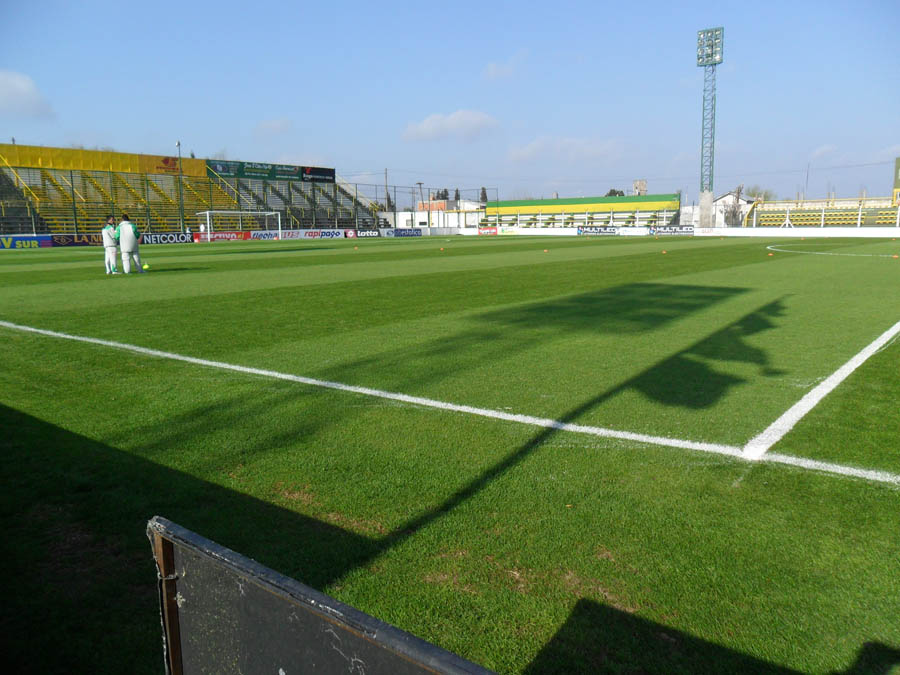
- Interactive map of Norberto 'Tito' Tomaghello Stadium
- Former names: Estadio General José de San Martín (1978–90)
- Address: Av. Humahuaca 244; Gob. Costa, Florencio Varela; Argentina
- Coordinates: 34°49′18″S 58°17′11″W
- Owner: C.S.y D. Defensa y Justicia
- Capacity: 13,559
- Field size: 100 x 70 m

Construction
- Built: 1978
- Opened: February 26, 1978; 48 years ago

Tenant
- Defensa y Justicia (1978–present)

Estadio Norberto "Tito" Tomaghello is a stadium located in the Gobernador Costa district of Florencio Varela Partido in Greater Buenos Aires, Argentina. It is the home ground for club Defensa y Justicia. The stadium, inaugurated in 1978, has a current capacity for 13,559 spectators.

Originally named "Estadio General José de San Martín, in December 1990 the venue was renamed "Norberto Tito Tomaghello" to honor a longtime president of the club.

== History ==
The Estadio Norberto "Tito" Tomaghello is a football stadium located in the town of Gobernador Costa, Florencio Varela partido, in the southern area of the Buenos Aires suburbs. Its owner is the Defensa y Justicia Social and Sports Club. It was inaugurated on February 26, 1978. That day, the Falcon played a friendly match against the Boca Juniors third division, which also had some professionals in the starting line-up. In November 1979, and before the same team, artificial lighting was released.

During the first years of the 2000s, the stadium still had a local grandstand (with capacity for 3,600), a visiting team grandstand with a similar capacity (3,500) and a wooden luxury stand which housed 10 press booths on two floors. In those years, the wooden structures were replaced by concrete stands with individual seats. At the same time, more press boxes were added. Subsequently, towards the end of 2011, an important investment was made for the construction of new lighting towers and a new lighting system. The sector of cabins and boxes was expanded again, going on to have 26 and 15, respectively.

In 2014, on the eve of promotion to the first division, the general grandstand, which until then was the visiting one, doubled its capacity: from 3,500 people to 7,000 seats. It premiered on May 19, 2014, in a match against Ferro Carril Oeste. At the end of 2014, on one of the sides of the playing field where the substitute benches are currently located, the construction of a new stall began. The building finished that same year and has 1000 seats. This sector premiered on February 23, 2015, on the second fixture of the Argentine championship against San Lorenzo.

When some of the wooden stands broke during a match vs River Plate in 2016 causing three Defensa y Justicia supporters to fall, the stadium was closed for safety reasons. To solve the problem, the club signed a contract for the total renovation of the grandstands in that sector. The new stands were inaugurated on August 26, 2017, in a match vs Gimnasia y Esgrima LP. In order to participate in international competitions (such as Copa Sudamericana and Copa Libertadores), Defensa y Justicia signed an agreement with Brightness LLC company for the installation of a new LED lighting system. The light towers were inaugurated in January 2020 in a match vs Talleres de Córdoba.

In February 2021, it was announced that the club was planning to refurbish the stadium again, installing a new seating area (including press booths) for 8,000 spectators. No works have been started as of 2024.

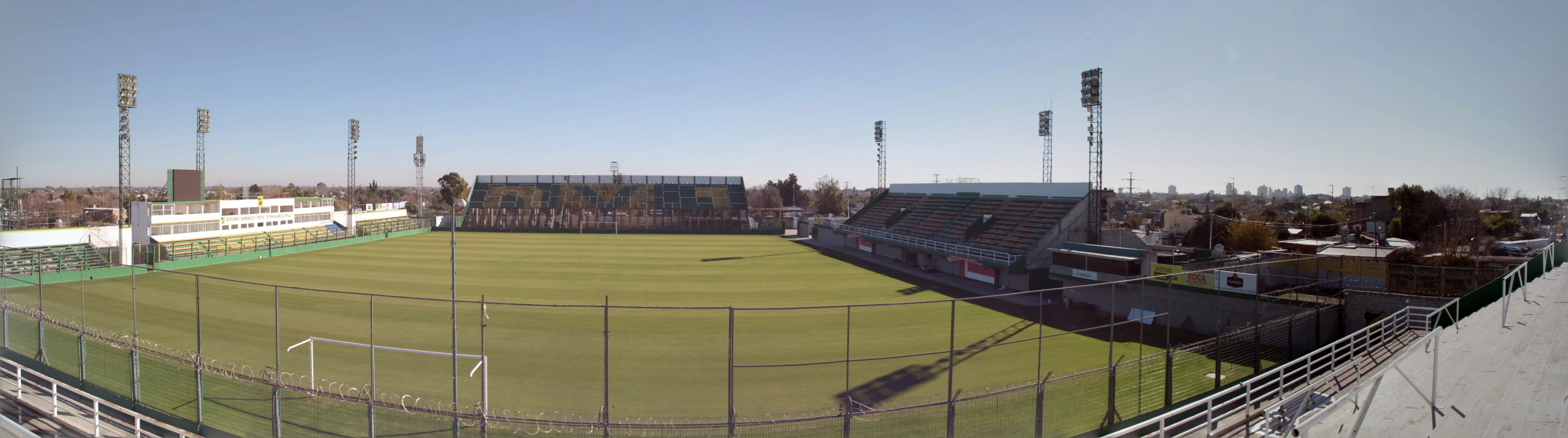
Panoramic view of the stadium, 2019
