= Club Olimpo =

Argentine sports club

Olimpo
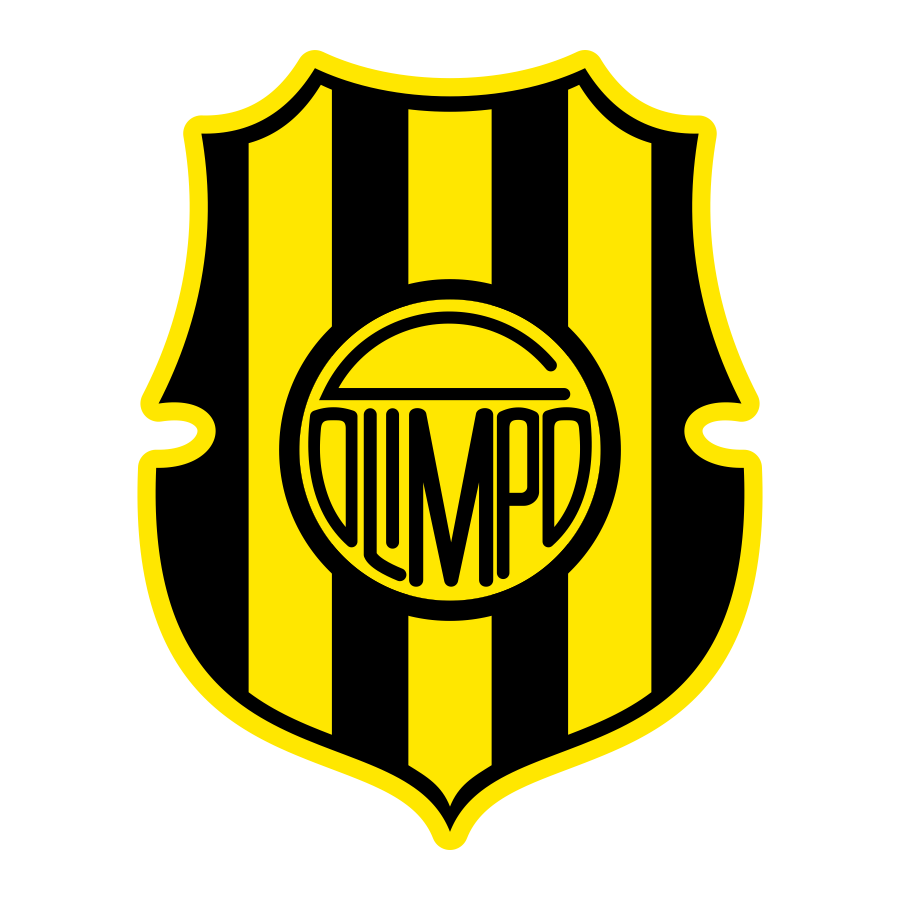
- Full name: Club Olimpo
- Nicknames: Aurinegro; El Equipo de la Ciudad
- Founded: 15 October 1910; 116 years ago
- Ground: Estadio Roberto Natalio Carminatti; Bahía Blanca, Buenos Aires Province, Argentina
- Capacity: 18,000
- President: Alfredo Dagna
- Manager: Gastón Lotitto
- League: Torneo Federal A
- 2024: 2023 Torneo Federal A Playoffs: Semifinals
- Website: Official website
Home colours	Away colours

Club Olimpo, usually referred to as Olimpo de Bahía Blanca, is an Argentine sports club based in the city of Bahía Blanca, Buenos Aires Province. The club was founded October 15th, 1910. It is mostly known for its football team, who currently competes in Torneo Federal A, the third tier of the Argentine football league system.

In basketball the club participated in the Torneo Nacional de Ascenso until the 2016/2017 season, stopping due to economic problems. Olimpo is considered one of the most recognized and important institutions in southern Argentina due to history, championships won, infrastructure, large number of sports, representation of the city of Bahía Blanca, and for its fan base.

Throughout the history of the club, their basketball team has stood out. Olimpo won the Campeonato Argentino de Clubes twice, 1974 and 1979. Until 1984, Olimpo participated in the highest category for Argentine basketball and participated in a sub-tournament of the Liga Nacional in 1986. Club Olimpo's basketball is recognized for being the only sports club from Bahía Blanca to reach a national title. Olimpo has won 19 championships in the first division of the Asociación Bahiense de Básquetbol, making them the team which has won the most championships.

In football, Olimpo has won the second division title three times (2001-02, 2006-07, and 2009-10), making them the club with the most wins in the competition, along with Banfield.

== History ==
The club is based in Bahía Blanca, having been founded in 1910.

In 1982 Olimpo had the national record of highest attendance in a cup match from a 2nd Tier club of 87,538 when they played in the Torneo Regional, where they lost in the Group 1 play-off to Mariano Moreno.

In 2002 Olimpo were promoted to the top division for the first time. In their first season back they finished 17th, but drastically improved this with a 5th place finish in the 2003 Clausura.

The team were relegated from the first division in the 2005–06 season, losing a play-off against Belgrano.

After winning the Apertura and Clausura of the Primera B Nacional in 2006–07 season, Olimpo returned to the Primera División. However, the team would be relegated during its first season back in the division, the 2007–08 season.

After two seasons back in the Primera B Nacional, Olimpo won promotion for the third time to play the 2010–11 season in the Argentine topflight. The club had a memorable campaign in the 2011 Clausura, finishing 4th in the table, with one of the highlights of the season being a 2-0 away victory against Boca Juniors in La Bombonera.

In 2017-18 the club was relegated from the top flight and in 2018-19 it suffered a double relegation, being relegated from Primera B Nacional into the 3rd tier.

== Players ==
=== Current squad ===
As of 4 May 2024.

Note: Flags indicate national team as defined under FIFA eligibility rules; some limited exceptions apply. Players may hold more than one non-FIFA nationality.

No.	Pos.	Nation	Player
—	GK	ARG	Nicolás Caprio
—	GK	ARG	Andoni Mendiguibel
—	GK	ARG	Martín García
—	DF	ARG	Agustín Osinaga
—	DF	ARG	Gianfranco Rossi
—	DF	ARG	Alessandro Balbo
—	DF	ARG	Facundo Aguirre
—	DF	ARG	Gastón Vega
—	DF	ARG	Jonatán Fleita
—	DF	ARG	Agustín Paredes
—	DF	ARG	Juan Albertinazzi
—	DF	ARG	Julio López
—	DF	ARG	Federico Pérez
—	MF	ARG	Facundo Affranchino
—	MF	ARG	Sebastián Fernández

No.	Pos.	Nation	Player
—	MF	ARG	Enzo Coacci
—	MF	ARG	Aldo Araujo
—	MF	ARG	Diego Ramírez
—	MF	ARG	Leandro Espejo
—	MF	ARG	Marcos Acosta
—	MF	ARG	José Parra
—	MF	ARG	Ivo Di Buo
—	MF	ARG	Thiago Faur
—	MF	ARG	Leandro Larrea
—	MF	ARG	Lionel Segovia
—	MF	ARG	Emmanuel García
—	FW	ARG	Maximiliano Osurak
—	FW	ARG	Luis Vila
—	FW	ARG	Julio Cáceres
—	FW	ARG	Rodrigo Acosta

=== Out on loan ===
Note: Flags indicate national team as defined under FIFA eligibility rules; some limited exceptions apply. Players may hold more than one non-FIFA nationality.

No.	Pos.	Nation	Player
—	FW	ARG	Axel Rodríguez (at Patronato until 31 December 2024)
—	FW	ARG	Braian Guille (at Colón until 31 December 2024)

== Honours ==
=== National ===
- Primera B Nacional
  - Winners (3): 2001–02, 2006–07, 2009–10
- Torneo del Interior
  - Winners: 1988-89

=== Regional ===
- Liga del Sur
  - Winners (28): 1911, 1921, 1949, 1950, 1951, 1952, 1953, 1954, 1955, 1962, 1965, 1966, 1968, 1976, 1977, 1978, 1979, 1980, 1981, 1982, 1983, 1984, 1985, 1986, 1987, 1988, 1995, 2009
