= Mariano Soso =

Argentine football manager (born 1981)

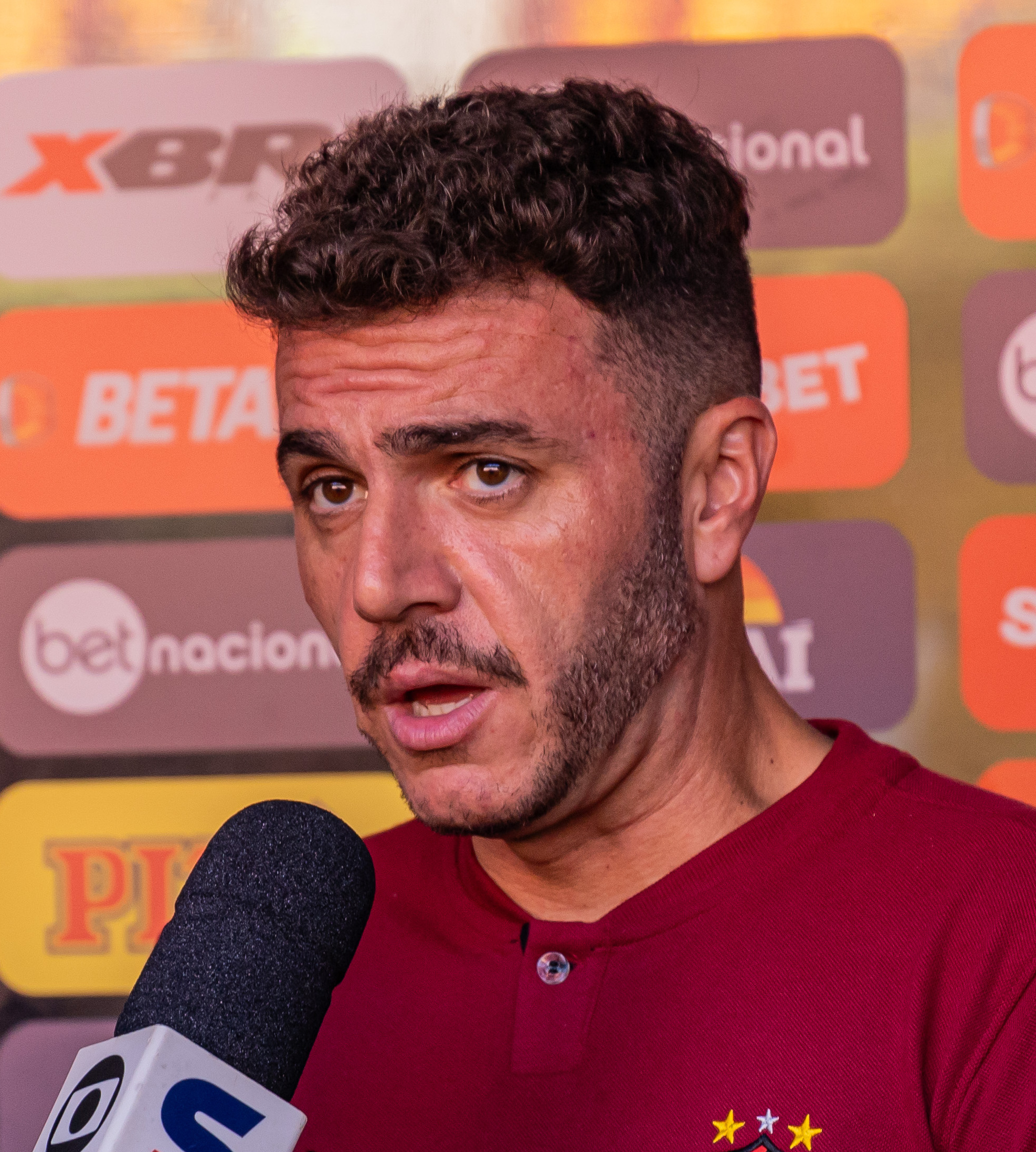
- Soso in 2024

Personal information
- Full name: Mariano Gustavo Soso
- Date of birth: 30 April 1981 (age 45)
- Place of birth: Rosario, Argentina

Team information
- Current team: Sport Recife (head coach)

Managerial career
- Years: Team
- Newell's Old Boys (youth)
- 2009: Argentinos Juniors (assistant)
- 2009–2010: Libertad (assistant)
- 2010–2011: Cerro Porteño (assistant)
- 2011: Newell's Old Boys (assistant)
- 2012: Nacional (assistant)
- 2012–2013: Unión Temuco (assistant)
- 2013–2014: Sporting Cristal (assistant)
- 2015: Real Garcilaso
- 2016: Sporting Cristal
- 2017: Gimnasia La Plata
- 2018–2019: Emelec
- 2019–2020: Defensa y Justicia
- 2020–2021: San Lorenzo
- 2022: O'Higgins
- 2023: Melgar
- 2024: Sport Recife
- 2024: Alianza Lima
- 2024–2025: Newell's Old Boys
- 2025–2026: Defensa y Justicia
- 2026–: Sport Recife

Mariano Gustavo Soso (born 30 April 1981) is an Argentine football manager. He is the current head coach of Brazilian club Sport Recife.

== Managerial career ==
Born in Rosario, Santa Fe, Soso started his career in Newell's Old Boys' youth categories. In 2009, he became Claudio Vivas' assistant at Argentinos Juniors for six months, before joining Javier Torrente's staff at Libertad, Cerro Porteño, Newell's and Nacional, under the same role.

In 2013, after one season as Hernán Lisi's assistant at Unión Temuco, Soso rejoined Vivas' staff at Sporting Cristal. He remained at the club even after Vivas' departure, being Daniel Ahmed's assistant as the club lifted the 2014 Torneo Descentralizado.

On 11 December 2014, Soso was appointed manager of Real Garcilaso for the upcoming season. Sacked the following 10 August after losing the 2015 Apertura, he returned to Cristal on 4 January 2016, being now first team manager.

On 19 December 2016, a day after winning the league title, Soso resigned from Cristal. The following 26 June, he was presented at Gimnasia La Plata, but decided to leave the club on 28 December.

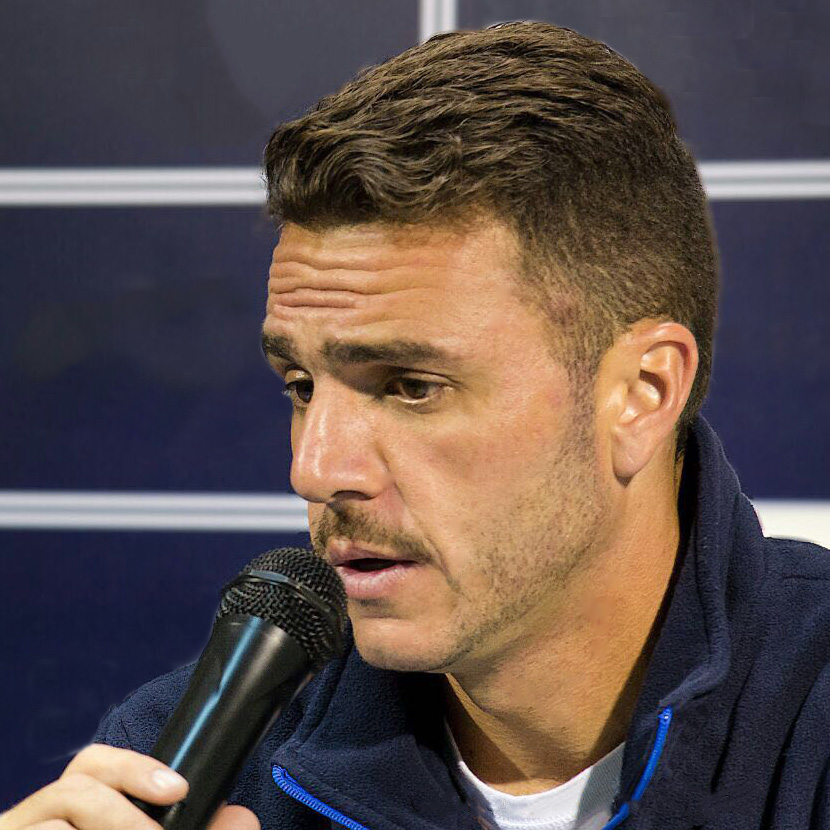
Soso in 2018

On 22 May 2018, after nearly six months without a club, Soso took over Ecuadorian Serie A side Emelec. He announced his departure from the club on 14 April of the following year, and was appointed at the helm of Defensa y Justicia on 5 June 2019. He left the club in mid-January 2020.

On 16 March 2020, Soso was appointed manager at San Lorenzo. He resigned the following 11 January, and was named in charge of Chilean side O'Higgins on 10 December 2021.

Soso left O'Higgins on a mutual agreement on 7 November 2022, and was appointed Melgar manager the following 14 March. He also left the latter side by the same manners on 21 November 2023.

On 5 December 2023, Sosa was hired by the Campeonato Brasileiro Série B team Sport Recife. On 7 April 2024, Sosa led the team to win the Campeonato Pernambucano title, defeating the rival Náutico in the final, and became the first foreign coach to win this championship for Sport Recife in 66 years.

Soso was sacked by Sport on 25 July 2024, after having only one win in the last six matches, and returned to Peru on 6 August after being named Alianza Lima manager. He left the latter by mutual consent on 21 November, and returned to his home country to take over Newell's Old Boys on 25 November.

Soso left Newell's on 17 February 2025, and returned to Defensa on 9 June. On 11 May 2026, he resigned from the latter, and returned to Sport on 8 September.

== Honours ==
Sporting Cristal

- Torneo Descentralizado: 2016

Sport Recife

- Campeonato Pernambucano: 2024
