= Florencio Varela Partido =

Florencio Varela Partido de Florencio Varela
- Department
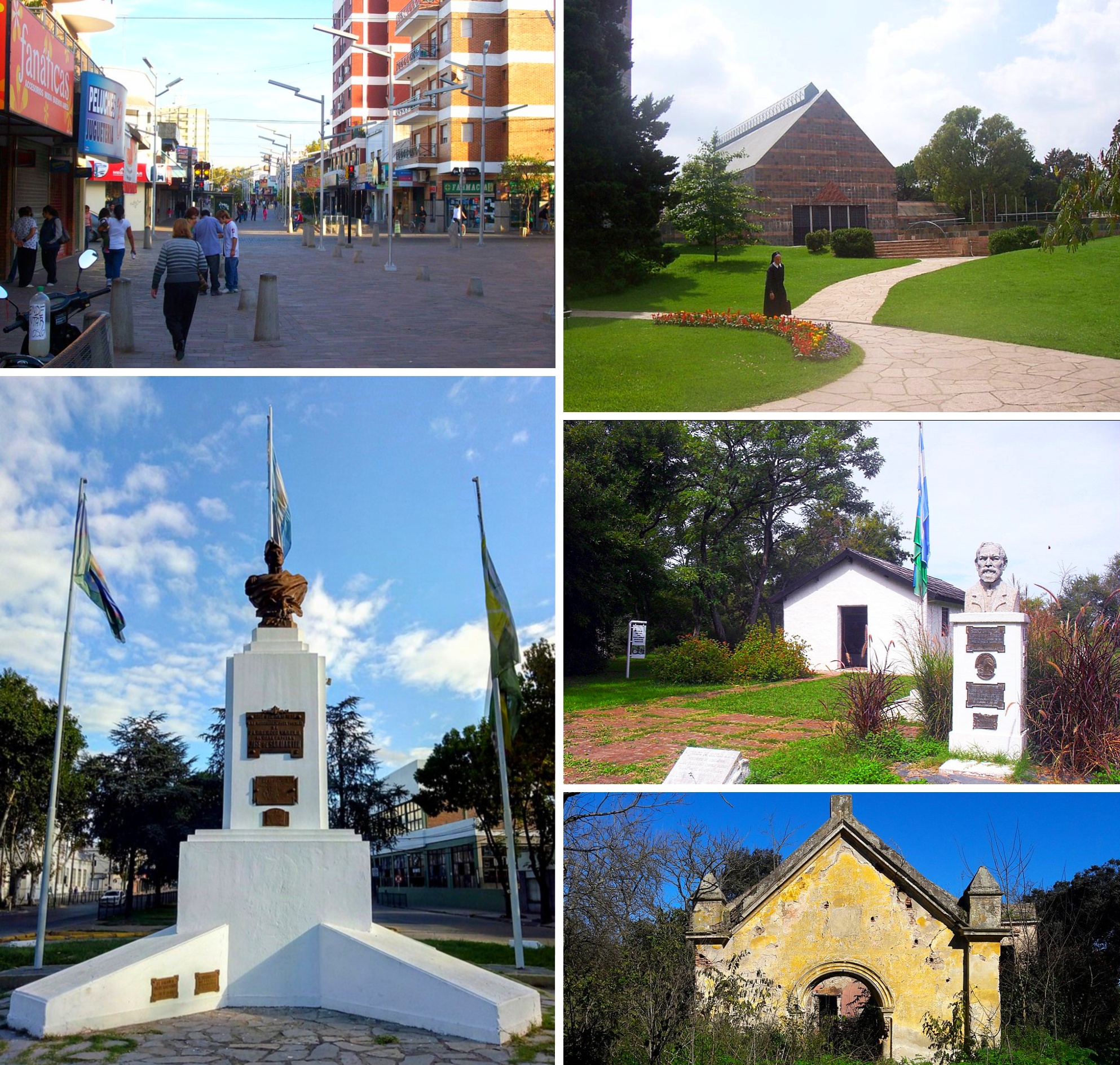
- Aerial view of San Juan Bautista square. Argentinian Biological Institute. Monteagudo pedestrian zone. Schönstatt Sanctuary. José de San Martín Monument. "Guillermo Enrique Hudson" ecological and cultural park. Ruins of the St. John Scottish Presbyterian Chapel.

- location of in Buenos Aires Province
- Coordinates: 34°49′S 58°17′W
- Country: Argentina
- Established: 30 January 1891
- Seat: Florencio Varela

Government
  - Intendant: Andrés Watson (Union for the Homeland)

Area
  - Total: 190 km^{2} (73 sq mi)

Population
  - Total: 423,992
  - Density: 2,200/km^{2} (5,800/sq mi)
- Demonym: varelense
- Postal Code: B1888
- IFAM: BUE040
- Area Code: 011
- Website: www.florenciovarela.gov.ar

Florencio Varela is a partido in the south of Gran Buenos Aires urban area in Buenos Aires Province, Argentina.

The partido has an area of 190 km^{2} (73 sq mi) and a population of 423,992 (2010 census [INDEC]). Its capital is Florencio Varela.

== Name ==
The partido is named in honour of Argentine writer and journalist Florencio Varela.

== Districts ==
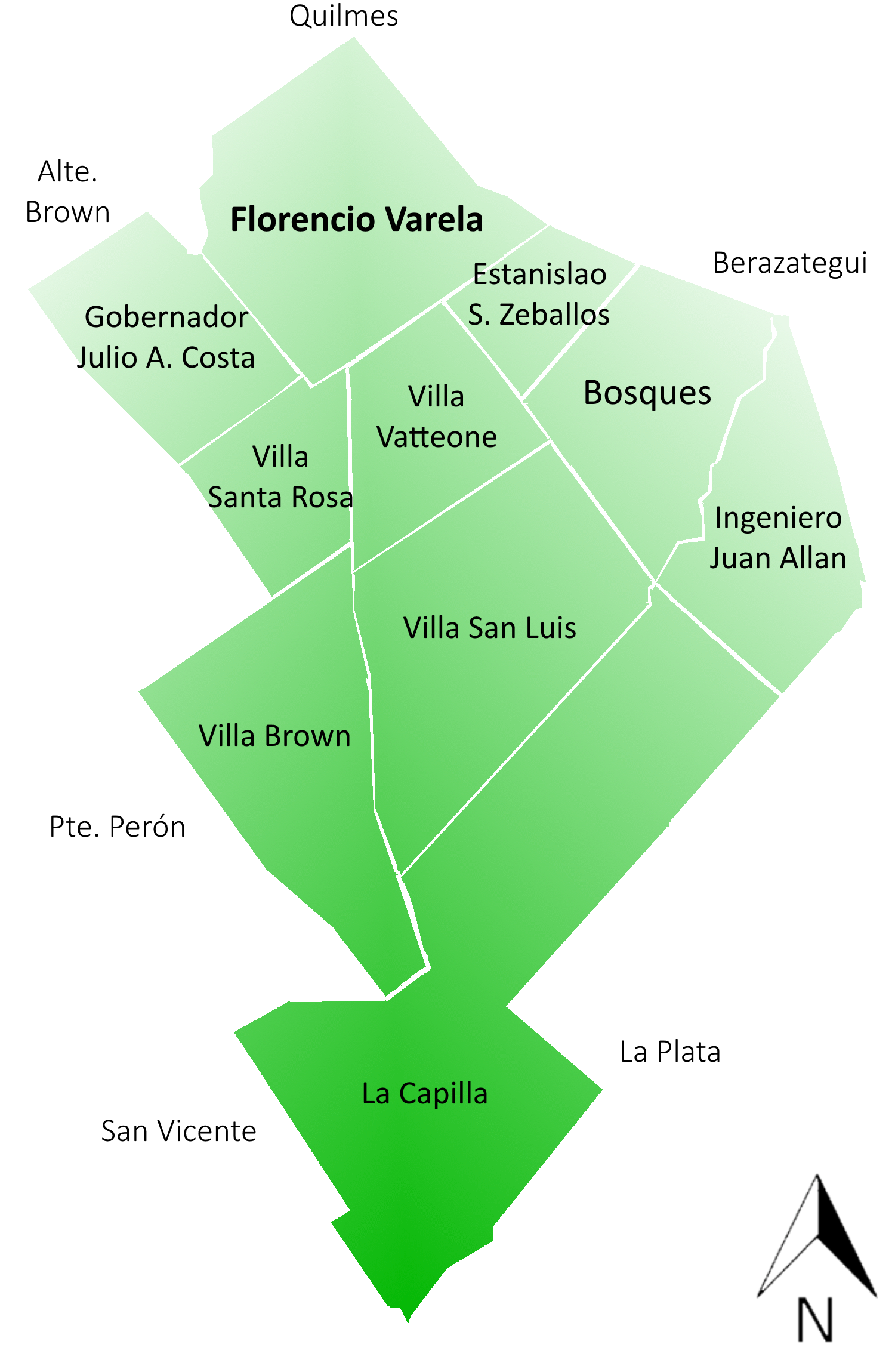

List of Districts in the partido, and their population (2001 census [INDEC])

- Bosques (51,663)
- Estanislao Severo Zeballos (20,967)
- Florencio Varela (120,678)
- Gobernador Julio A. Costa (49,291)
- Ingeniero Juan Allan (26,602)
- Villa Brown (6,034)
- Villa San Luis (10,234)
- Villa Santa Rosa (22,017)
- Villa Vatteone (35,985)
- La Capilla (5,499)
