= Defensa y Justicia =

Argentine football club

- Full name: Club Social y Deportivo Defensa y Justicia
- Nickname: El Halcón (The Falcon)
- Short name: DYJ
- Founded: 20 March 1935; 91 years ago
- Ground: Estadio Norberto Tomaghello
- Capacity: 20,000
- Chairman: Diego Lemme
- Manager: Julio Vaccari
- League: Primera División
- 2025: 18th of 30
- Website: defensayjusticia.org.ar
| Home colours | Away colours | Third colours |

Club Social y Deportivo Defensa y Justicia, commonly known as Defensa y Justicia, is an Argentine football club from Florencio Varela, Buenos Aires, established in 1935. The senior squad currently plays in the Primera División, the top division of the Argentine football league system.

The team plays its home games at Estadio Norberto Tomaghello, with a capacity of approximately 20,000. Defensa y Justicia is one of the clubs with most seasons in Primera B Nacional, also having played in all the divisions of the Argentine league system since their debut in Primera D Metropolitana in 1978.

In 2016, Defensa y Justicia qualified to play their first international tournament, the 2017 Copa Sudamericana. The team advanced to second stage but then lost to Chapecoense on penalties.

In 2021, the club achieved their first international titles after having won both, 2020 Copa Sudamericana to Lanús and 2021 Recopa Sudamericana beating Palmeiras on penalties. Along with Boca Juniors and Deportivo Riestra, Defensa y Justicia is one of the clubs that have not been relegated since their promotion to Primera División.

== History ==
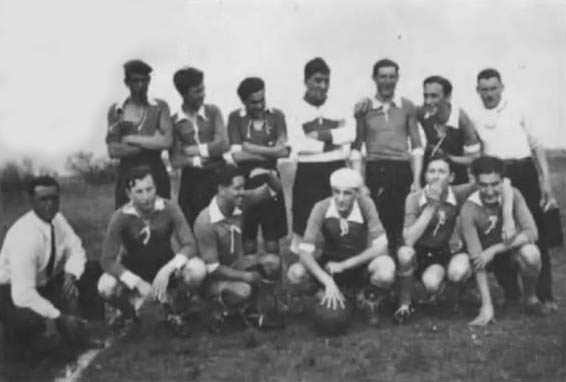
An early amateur team of Defensa y Justicia in 1935, the year the club was founded

The institution was founded on 20 March 1935 by a group of friends who wanted to form a local team. There are no sources explaining how the name was given to the club. Presided by Norberto Tomaghello, Defensa y Justicia affiliated to Argentine Football Association, built its stadium, which was opened with a friendly match against Boca Juniors reserve team in December 1977.

The club's original colors were blue with white collars and cuffs, which were changed to yellow with green details. These were the colors of the bus line "El Halcón", a company that belonged to the club president at the time. This company used its buses to bring the fans to away games, and thus received the nickname "Los Halcones de Varela".

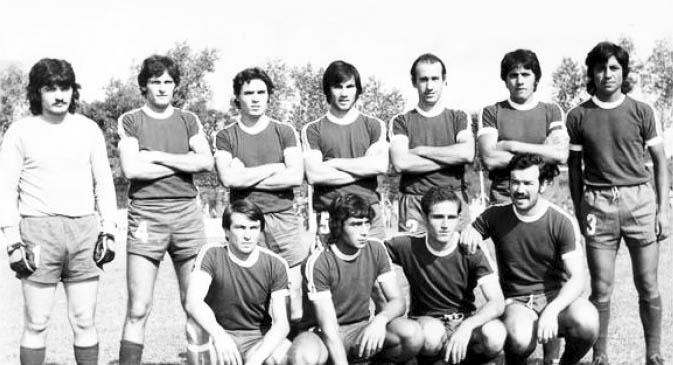
Team of Defensa y Justicia (in the original blue kit) that debuted in Primera D in March 1978

Even though the club was founded as early as 1935, Defensa y Justicia did not play in official tournaments until 1978, when the team debuted in Primera D, defeating Cañuelas 2–1. The starting line-up was: Ramón Correa; Benito López, Roberto Lucarini, Raúl Bustos, Alberto Cortez; Horacio Roselli, Jorge Giache, César Echeverry; Luis Briega, Héctor Cardozo, Oscar Bruno.

Defensa y Justicia played in Primera D until 1982 when the team won the championship and promoted to the upper division, Primera C. Only three years after, Defensa promoted again (this time to Primera B, the second division by then) after winning their second title. Defensa achieved promotion after beating Barracas Central 7–0. That same year, Defensa y Justicia played an "Octogonal", an 8-team tournament which winner promoted to Primera División.

After a 1–1 draw v Atlanta, the club promoted to recently created Primera B Nacional on 1 June 1986, achieving their second promotion within six months. In the first Primera B Nacional season, 1986–87, the team finished 10th. The following years Defensa would be relegated again, but the club returned to Primera B Nacional when winning the 1996–97 title in B Metro.

In 1998–99 season and coached by Ricardo Villa, Defensa was near to promote after eliminating Arsenal de Sarandí and Cipolletti, then losing to Chacarita Juniors (which would then promote along with champion Instituto) 4–2 on aggregate. In the 1999–2000 season, Defensa was coached by Jorge Burruchaga but could not qualify to "Torneo Reducido" (promotion and relegation playoff).

On 14 May 2014, coached by Diego Cocca, Defensa y Justicia reached promotion to Primera División for the first time in its history when they beat San Martín de San Juan 1–0 with the only goal of the match scored by Brian Fernández.

Defensa y Justicia debuted in the 2014 Primera División on 9 August 9, 2014 v Racing Club, being defeated 3–1. The team did not make a good performance, finishing 18th out of 20 teams. On the other hand, Defensa had a better performance in Copa Argentina where they eliminated Godoy Cruz and San Lorenzo, but lost to Atlético de Rafaela in quarterfinals. In the next season, 2015 (contested by 30 teams due a restructuring of the tournament), Defensa y Justicia finished in the 21st position, with only 8 games won.

In June 2015, Ariel Holan was appointed as coach in replacement of José Oscar Flores. It was the first tenure of Holan at a professional club in Primera Division after having worked in several coaching positions at Arsenal de Sarandí, Independiente, and Estudiantes de La Plata. He had also worked with Matías Almeyda in River Plate. In 2015–16 Copa Argentina, Defensa eliminated Talleres de Córdoba and then Independiente in the second stage before losing to Belgrano. Nevertheless, in the 2016 Primera División season it was one of the six teams to qualify to 2017 Copa Sudamericana, the first international competition where the club participated. The team advanced to the second stage after eliminating Brazilian side São Paulo on away goal rule but then lost to Chapecoense on penalties after the series ended 1–1 on aggregate.

Being coached by Sebastián Beccacece, Defensa y Justicia made their first performance in 2018–19 Primera División season finishing 2nd. to champion Racing therefore qualifying for the 2020 Copa Libertadores group stage. Defensa y Justicia completed the season with 15 wins, 8 draws and only 2 losses over 25 matches played with 33 goals scored and 18 against. In 2018 Copa Sudamericana, the club eliminated América de Cali and El Nacional qualifying to group stages, where it eliminated Banfield being then beaten by Colombian side Junior on away goal rule after a 3–3 on aggregate.

== Players ==
=== Current squad ===
As of 23 September 2026

Note: Flags indicate national team as defined under FIFA eligibility rules; some limited exceptions apply. Players may hold more than one non-FIFA nationality.

| No. | Pos. | Nation | Player |
|---|---|---|---|
| 1 | GK | ARG | Matías Borgogno (on loan from San Martín) |
| 2 | DF | ARG | Samuel Lucero |
| 3 | DF | PAR | Fernando Román |
| 5 | MF | ARG | Julián López |
| 6 | DF | URU | Ezequiel Burdín |
| 8 | MF | CHI | César Pérez |
| 9 | FW | ARG | Leandro Fernández |
| 10 | MF | ARG | Aarón Molinas |
| 11 | FW | ARG | Tiziano Perrotta (on loan from Elche) |
| 15 | MF | ARG | Santiago Sosa |
| 16 | DF | ARG | Ayrton Portillo |
| 17 | FW | ARG | Agustín Hausch |
| 19 | FW | ARG | David Barbona |
| 21 | DF | PAR | David Martínez (on loan from River Plate) |

| No. | Pos. | Nation | Player |
|---|---|---|---|
| 22 | MF | ARG | Maximiliano Porcel (on loan from Vélez Sarsfield) |
| 23 | MF | ARG | Mateo Aguiar |
| 24 | FW | URU | Juan Gutiérrez |
| 25 | FW | ARG | Facundo Altamira (on loan from Godoy Cruz) |
| 26 | MF | ARG | Jeremías Lucco |
| 27 | FW | ARG | Domingo Blanco (on loan from Tijuana) |
| 28 | DF | ARG | Valentín Loza |
| 29 | DF | ARG | Damián Fernández |
| 30 | DF | ARG | Demián Domínguez (on loan from Vélez Sarsfield) |
| 32 | DF | ARG | Nazareno Roselli |
| 33 | DF | ARG | Lucas Souto |
| 36 | GK | ARG | Lautaro Amadé |
| 40 | DF | ARG | Máximo Rodríguez |

==== Other players under contract ====
Note: Flags indicate national team as defined under FIFA eligibility rules; some limited exceptions apply. Players may hold more than one non-FIFA nationality.

| No. | Pos. | Nation | Player |
|---|---|---|---|
| 9 | FW | URU | Luciano González (on loan from Peñarol) |
| 11 | MF | ARG | Éver Banega |

| No. | Pos. | Nation | Player |
|---|---|---|---|
| 34 | MF | ARG | Tomás Escalante |

=== Reserve squad ===
Note: Flags indicate national team as defined under FIFA eligibility rules; some limited exceptions apply. Players may hold more than one non-FIFA nationality.

| No. | Pos. | Nation | Player |
|---|---|---|---|
| 28 | DF | ARG | Valentín Loza |
| 35 | DF | ARG | Mateo López |
| 40 | DF | ARG | Máximo Rodríguez |
| 41 | FW | ARG | Ramiro Gagliardi |

| No. | Pos. | Nation | Player |
|---|---|---|---|
| 42 | MF | ARG | Juan Pablo Moreno |
| 43 | FW | PAR | Emiliano Cantero |
| 44 | MF | ARG | Jonás Cabrera |

==== Out on loan ====
Note: Flags indicate national team as defined under FIFA eligibility rules; some limited exceptions apply. Players may hold more than one non-FIFA nationality.

| No. | Pos. | Nation | Player |
|---|---|---|---|
| 1 | GK | ARG | Facundo Masuero (at Nueva Chicago until 31 December 2026) |
| 1 | GK | ARG | Marcos Ledesma (at Instituto until 31 December 2027) |
| 3 | DF | ARG | Alexis Soto (at Rosario Central until 31 December 2026) |
| 6 | DF | URU | Lucas Ferreira (at Peñarol until 31 December 2026) |
| 7 | FW | ARG | Leandro Espejo (at Olimpo until 31 December 2026) |
| 7 | FW | ARG | Lautaro Fedele (at Atlanta until 31 December 2026) |
| 9 | FW | ARG | Nazareno Fúnez (at San Martín-SJ until 31 December 2026) |
| 9 | FW | ARG | Juan Miritello (at Fortaleza until 31 December 2026) |
| 11 | FW | ARG | Gastón Togni (at Peñarol until 31 December 2026) |
| 14 | DF | ARG | Ezequiel Cannavo (at Racing Club until 31 December 2026) |

| No. | Pos. | Nation | Player |
|---|---|---|---|
| 20 | MF | ARG | Lucas González (at Central Córdoba until 31 December 2026) |
| 20 | MF | PAR | Aldo Maíz (at Sportivo Luqueño until 31 December 2026) |
| 21 | MF | ARG | Matías Miranda (at Macará until 31 December 2026) |
| 21 | DF | ARG | Hernán Zuliani (at San Martín-SJ until 31 December 2026) |
| 22 | GK | URU | Cristopher Fiermarín (at Atlético Bucaramanga until 30 June 2027) |
| 24 | DF | ARG | Francisco Marco (at Almagro until 31 December 2026) |
| 29 | FW | ARG | Gastón González (at Sarmiento until 31 December 2026) |
| 35 | MF | ARG | Benjamín Schamine (at Godoy Cruz until 31 December 2027) |
| 39 | MF | ARG | Tomás Ortiz (at Gimnasia-M until 31 December 2026) |

== Managers ==
- (Argentina) Ricardo Zielinski (2002–03)
- (Colombia) Jorge Bermúdez (2010)
- (Argentina) Jorge Almirón (2012–13)
- (Argentina) Diego Cocca (2013–14)
- (Argentina) José Oscar Flores (2014–15)
- (Argentina) Ariel Holan (2015–16)
- (Argentina) Sebastián Beccacece (2016–17)
- (Argentina) Nelson Vivas (2017–18)
- (Argentina) Sebastián Beccacece (2018–19)
- (Argentina) Mariano Soso (2019–20)
- (Argentina) Hernán Crespo (2020–2021)
- (Argentina) Sebastián Beccacece (2021–2022)
- (Argentina) Julio Vaccari (2022–2024)
- (Argentina) Francisco Meneghini (2024)
- (Argentina) Pablo de Muner (2024–2025)
- (Argentina) Mariano Soso (2025–)

== Honours ==
=== National ===
- Primera B (1): 1996–97
- Primera C (1): 1985
- Primera D (1): 1982

=== International ===
- Copa Sudamericana (1): 2020
- Recopa Sudamericana (1): 2021
