= 2019–20 Ferro Carril Oeste season =

Ferro Carril Oeste
2019–20 season
- President: Daniel Pandolfi
- Manager: Jorge Cordon
- Stadium: Estadio Arquitecto Ricardo Etcheverry
- Top goalscorer: League: Renzo Tesuri (1); Franco Pulicastro; Lucas Pugh; All: Renzo Tesuri (1); Franco Pulicastro; Lucas Pugh

The 2019–20 season is Ferro Carril Oeste's 18th consecutive season in the second division of Argentine football, Primera B Nacional.

The season generally covers the period from 1 July 2019 to 30 June 2020.

== Review ==
=== Pre-season ===
Rodrigo Melo's departure to Estudiantes (BA) was confirmed on 11 June 2019. 18 June saw Guido Milán join from Veracruz. Three days later, midfielder Rodrigo Brandán was loaned out to Sacachispas. A third player left on 24 June, as Franco Lazzaroni made a move across the division to Gimnasia y Esgrima. Cain Fara was signed by Primera División outfit Aldosivi on 24 June. Walter Busse announced, on 26 June, that he was to leave the club at the conclusion of his contract, days later, for personal reasons. Gabriel Díaz joined Patronato of the Primera División on 29 June. However, Ferro claimed that a deal was still being discussed and Díaz had been offered a new contract. Numerous loans from the previous campaign officially expired on and around 30 June.

Ferro revealed, on 1 July, that Gabriel Díaz had indeed put pen to paper on a new contract, though would be loaned to Patronato for the 2019–20 season. Leonel Álvarez, after signing a new deal, was moved out on loan to Flandria on 1 July. Gustavo Canto was captured on loan from Dorados de Sinaloa of Ascenso MX on 4 July. Leonardo Landriel and Augusto Vantomme terminated their contracts on 5 July, subsequently joining Los Andes and Acassuso. Tomás Asprea, after his previous loan deal expired on 30 June, returned to Ferro on a second temporary contract from Comunicaciones on 5 July. Ferro met Huracán in their opening friendlies on 6 July, with the top-flight club ending the day undefeated. Pablo Ortega penned terms from Central Córdoba on 8 July.

On 10 July, having renewed their respective contracts, Matías Ramírez and Cristian Carrizo were loaned out to Villa Dálmine. Ferro beat Aldosivi in pre-season matches on 10 July. Ferro suffered losses in friendlies with San Lorenzo on 18 July. Ferro couldn't secure a friendly victory over Almagro on 20 July, falling to a draw and a defeat on home soil. Ferro recorded a win and a tie with Tristán Suárez in exhibitions on 24 July. Days later, encounters with Comunicaciones were cancelled due to bad weather. 31 July saw Ferro reach an agreement for Carlos Carbonero. Soon after, Ferro revealed a new contract was offered to Enzo Díaz; who was to answer in the succeeding days. They beat Defensores de Belgrano by two before losing by a goal on 2 August in pre-season.

Also on 2 August, Gastón Ada terminated his contract with Ferro - subsequently joining Chilean second tier team Deportes Valdivia on 4 August. 2 August also saw Pablo Medina sign for Justo José de Urquiza on loan. On 6 August, Ferro announced that Enzo Díaz had rejected their contract offer - with the club subsequently accepting a $325,000 offer from Tigre. Ferro were scheduled to face Banfield on 9 August, but the fixture was scrapped due to the poor climate. Carlos Carbonero's transfer from Deportivo Cali was officially completed on 9 August. Arriving from Mexico's Coras de Nayarit, Lucas Pugh penned contract terms on 15 August.

=== August ===
Ferro were beaten by two goals at home to Platense in Primera B Nacional on 19 August, as Andrés Bailo conceded twice in as many minutes in the second half. Ferro lost a five-goal thriller to Independiente Rivadavia on 25 August, despite a late goal from debutant Franco Pulicastro.

=== September ===
Ferro's poor form continued into September, as they succumbed to a 0–2 loss at the Estadio Arquitecto Ricardo Etcheverry to Atlanta. Ferro stopped the rot on 8 September, as they secured their first point of the campaign at home to Mitre. However, on 13 September, they returned to losing ways with a defeat to Estudiantes (RC).

== Squad ==
Squad No.	Nationality	Name	Position(s)	Date of Birth (age)	Signed from
Goalkeepers
	Argentina	Andrés Bailo	GK	6 September 1988 (age 38)	Colón
	Argentina	Luciano Jachfe	GK	18 July 2001 (age 25)	Academy
	Argentina	Iván López	GK	17 February 1996 (age 30)	Academy
Defenders
	Argentina	Nahuel Amarilla	CB	22 May 1996 (age 30)	Academy
	Argentina	Gustavo Canto	CB	25 February 1994 (age 32)	Dorados de Sinaloa (loan)
	Argentina	Lucas Ferrari	LB	31 March 1997 (age 29)	Academy
	Argentina	Hernán Grana	RB	12 April 1985 (age 41)	All Boys
	Argentina	Matías Mariatti	CB	26 January 1997 (age 29)	Academy
	Argentina	Rodrigo Mazur	LB	3 January 1992 (age 34)	Academy
	Argentina	Guido Milán	CB	3 July 1987 (age 39)	Veracruz
	Argentina	Matías Muñoz	CB	22 March 1996 (age 30)	Academy
	Argentina	Sebastián Olivarez	RB	15 May 1992 (age 34)	Godoy Cruz (loan)
	Argentina	Lucas Souto	DF	11 October 1998 (age 28)	Academy
Midfielders
	Argentina	Carlos Airala	AM	25 August 2002 (age 24)	Academy
	Argentina	Tomás Asprea	RM	28 February 1995 (age 31)	Comunicaciones (loan)
	Colombia	Carlos Carbonero	RM	25 July 1990 (age 36)	Deportivo Cali
	Argentina	Francisco García	MF	29 June 1998 (age 28)	Academy
	Argentina	Nicolás Gómez	AM	25 February 1996 (age 30)	Academy
	Argentina	Nahuel Maidana	AM	7 April 1998 (age 28)	Academy
	Argentina	Fernando Miranda	CM	14 October 1997 (age 29)	Academy
	Argentina	Federico Murillo	RM	4 January 1997 (age 29)	Academy
	Argentina	Pablo Ortega	AM	29 August 1994 (age 32)	Central Córdoba
	United States	Adam Ozeri	AM	7 March 1998 (age 28)	Academy
	Argentina	Federico Segovia	MF	21 July 1997 (age 29)	Academy
	Argentina	Lautaro Torres	CM	28 September 1996 (age 30)	Academy
Forwards
	Argentina	Bruno Barranco	FW	13 March 1997 (age 29)	Academy
	Argentina	Cristian Bordacahar	FW	27 October 1991 (age 35)	Brown
	Argentina	Enzo Díaz	FW	14 January 1992 (age 34)	UAI Urquiza
	Argentina	Lautaro Gordillo	FW	6 April 1999 (age 27)	Academy
	Argentina	Lucas Pugh	FW	1 January 1994 (age 32)	Coras de Nayarit
	Argentina	Franco Pulicastro	FW	23 September 1999 (age 27)	Academy
	Argentina	Renzo Tesuri	RW	7 June 1996 (age 30)	Gimnasia y Esgrima
Out on loan					Loaned to
	Argentina	Leonel Álvarez	LM	25 March 1996 (age 30)	Flandria
	Argentina	Cristian Carrizo	MF	5 July 1999 (age 27)	Villa Dálmine
	Argentina	Pablo Medina	DF	3 March 1998 (age 28)	Justo José de Urquiza
	Argentina	Matías Ramírez	FW	14 March 1999 (age 27)	Villa Dálmine

== Transfers ==
Domestic transfer windows:
3 July 2019 to 24 September 2019
20 January 2020 to 19 February 2020.

=== Transfers in ===
Date from	Position	Nationality	Name	From	Ref.
3 July 2019 (Note: Deal agreed on 18 June 2019)	CB	Argentina	Guido Milán	Veracruz	
8 July 2019	AM	Argentina	Pablo Ortega	Central Córdoba	
9 August 2019	RM	Colombia	Carlos Carbonero	Deportivo Cali	
15 August 2019	FW	Argentina	Lucas Pugh	Coras de Nayarit	

=== Transfers out ===
Date from	Position	Nationality	Name	To	Ref.
1 July 2019	AM	Argentina	Walter Busse	Gimnasia y Esgrima (J) (Note: Released by Ferro Carril Oeste on 30 June.)	
1 July 2019	CB	Argentina	Cain Fara	Aldosivi (Note: Released by Ferro Carril Oeste on 30 June.)	
3 July 2019 (Note: Deal agreed on 11 June 2019)	CM	Argentina	Rodrigo Melo	Estudiantes (BA) (Note: Released by Ferro Carril Oeste on 30 June.)	
3 July 2019 (Note: Deal agreed on 24 June 2019)	CB	Argentina	Franco Lazzaroni	Gimnasia y Esgrima	
5 July 2019	MF	Argentina	Leonardo Landriel	Los Andes (Note: Released by Ferro Carril Oeste on 5 July.)	
8 July 2019	GK	Argentina	Augusto Vantomme	Acassuso (Note: Released by Ferro Carril Oeste on 5 July.)	
4 August 2019	AM	Argentina	Gastón Ada	Deportes Valdivia (Note: Released by Ferro Carril Oeste on 2 August.)	

=== Loans in ===
Start date	Position	Nationality	Name	From	End date	Ref.
4 July 2019	CB	Argentina	Gustavo Canto	Dorados de Sinaloa	30 June 2020	
5 July 2019	RM	Argentina	Tomás Asprea	Comunicaciones	30 June 2020	

=== Loans out ===
Start date	Position	Nationality	Name	To	End date	Ref.
3 July 2019 (Note: Deal agreed on 21 June 2019)	MF	Argentina	Rodrigo Brandán	Sacachispas	30 June 2020	
3 July 2019 (Note: Deal agreed on 1 July 2019)	DF	Argentina	Gabriel Díaz	Patronato	30 June 2020	
3 July 2019 (Note: Deal agreed on 1 July 2019)	LM	Argentina	Leonel Álvarez	Flandria	30 June 2020	
10 July 2019	FW	Argentina	Matías Ramírez	Villa Dálmine	30 June 2020	
10 July 2019	MF	Argentina	Cristian Carrizo	Villa Dálmine	30 June 2020	
2 August 2019	DF	Argentina	Pablo Medina	Justo José de Urquiza	30 June 2020	

== Friendlies ==
=== Pre-season ===
Ferro Carril Oeste, on 17 June 2019, revealed an exhibition fixture with Huracán, with it set for 6 July. A further friendly with Tristán Suárez was tentatively scheduled for 20 July on 28 June. On 1 July, a match with Aldosivi of the Primera División was set. Almagro scheduled an encounter with Ferro for 20 July, the same date as the Tristán Suárez game. Ferro announced friendlies with San Lorenzo and Comunicaciones on 12 July, as well as the rescheduling of the Tristán Suárez fixture. They'd also play Defensores de Belgrano and Banfield in early August.

Win Draw Loss

6 July 2019 Friendly	Huracán	1–0	Ferro Carril Oeste	Buenos Aires, Argentina
	A. Chávez	Ferro Carril Oeste; Olé; 70 min. match		Stadium: Estadio Tomás Adolfo Ducó

6 July 2019 Friendly	Huracán	1–1	Ferro Carril Oeste	Buenos Aires, Argentina
	J. Mendoza	Ferro Carril Oeste; Olé; 70 min. match	N. Maidana (pen.)	Stadium: Estadio Tomás Adolfo Ducó

10 July 2019 Friendly	Aldosivi	0–1	Ferro Carril Oeste	Mar del Plata, Argentina
		Grupo La Provincia	E. Díaz	Stadium: Campo Deportivo de Aldosivi

10 July 2019 Friendly	Aldosivi	0–2	Ferro Carril Oeste	Mar del Plata, Argentina
		Grupo La Provincia	B. Barranco; N. Maidana	Stadium: Campo Deportivo de Aldosivi

18 July 2019 Friendly	San Lorenzo	2–1	Ferro Carril Oeste	Buenos Aires, Argentina
	H. Fértoli 11', 32'	Ferro Carril Oeste; ESPN; 80 min. match	E. Díaz	Stadium: Estadio Pedro Bidegain; Referee: Leandro Idio (Argentina)

18 July 2019 Friendly	San Lorenzo	1–0	Ferro Carril Oeste	Buenos Aires, Argentina
	N. Barrios 10'	Ferro Carril Oeste; ESPN; 80 min. match		Stadium: Estadio Pedro Bidegain; Referee: Leandro Idio (Argentina)

20 July 2019 Friendly	Ferro Carril Oeste	1–1	Almagro	Buenos Aires, Argentina
	F. Miranda	Ferro Carril Oeste; Mundo Ascenso; 70 min. match	F. Suárez	Stadium: Estadio Arquitecto Ricardo Etcheverry

20 July 2019 Friendly	Ferro Carril Oeste	0–1	Almagro	Buenos Aires, Argentina
		Ferro Carril Oeste; Mundo Ascenso; 70 min. match	F. Suárez	Stadium: Estadio Arquitecto Ricardo Etcheverry

24 July 2019 Friendly	Ferro Carril Oeste	1–1	Tristán Suárez	Buenos Aires, Argentina
	S. Olivarez	Ferro Carril Oeste; Mundo Ascenso; 70 min. match	F. Giménez	Stadium: Estadio Arquitecto Ricardo Etcheverry

24 July 2019 Friendly	Ferro Carril Oeste	1–0	Tristán Suárez	Buenos Aires, Argentina
	B. Barranco	Ferro Carril Oeste; Mundo Ascenso; 70 min. match		Stadium: Estadio Arquitecto Ricardo Etcheverry

27 July 2019 Friendly	Comunicaciones	Cancelled	Ferro Carril Oeste	Argentina

27 July 2019 Friendly	Comunicaciones	Cancelled	Ferro Carril Oeste	Argentina

2 August 2019 Friendly	Ferro Carril Oeste	2–0	Defensores de Belgrano	Buenos Aires, Argentina
	B. Barranco; R. Tesuri	Defensores de Belgrano; Grupo La Provincia; 80 min. match		Stadium: Estadio Arquitecto Ricardo Etcheverry

2 August 2019 Friendly	Ferro Carril Oeste	0–1	Defensores de Belgrano	Buenos Aires, Argentina
		Defensores de Belgrano; Grupo La Provincia; 80 min. match	M. Núñez	Stadium: Estadio Arquitecto Ricardo Etcheverry

9 August 2019 Friendly	Banfield	Cancelled	Ferro Carril Oeste	Luis Guillón, Argentina
		Ferro Carril Oeste		Stadium: Campo de Deportes Alfredo Palacios

== Competitions ==
=== Primera B Nacional ===
==== Results summary ====
Overall								Home						Away					
Pld	W	D	L	GF	GA	GD	Pts	W	D	L	GF	GA	GD	W	D	L	GF	GA	GD
5	0	1	4	3	9	−6	1	0	1	2	0	4	−4	0	0	2	3	5	−2

Last updated: 14 September 2019.
Source: Soccerway

==== Matches ====
The fixtures for the 2019–20 league season were announced on 1 August 2019, with a new format of split zones being introduced. Ferro Carril Oeste were drawn in Zone A.

Win Draw Loss

19 August 2019 1	Ferro Carril Oeste	0–2	Platense	Buenos Aires, Argentina
21:05 GMT-3		Ferro Carril Oeste; Saavedra Online; Soccerway	F. Curuchet 55'; C. Bordacahar 57' (o.g.)	Stadium: Estadio Arquitecto Ricardo Etcheverry; Referee: Nazareno Arasa (Argentina)

24 August 2019 2	Independiente Rivadavia	3–2	Ferro Carril Oeste	Mendoza, Argentina
20:05 GMT-3	M. Viguet 8'; J. Navas 50'; G. Klusener 71'	Ferro Carril Oeste; Cadena 3 Soccerway	R. Tesuri 23'; F. Pulicastro 76'	Stadium: Estadio Bautista Gargantini; Referee: Héctor Paletta (Argentina)

3 September 2019 3	Ferro Carril Oeste	0–2	Atlanta	Buenos Aires, Argentina
21:05 GMT-3		Ferro Carril Oeste; Clarín; Soccerway	R. Mazur 56' (o.g.); L. López 59' (pen.)	Stadium: Estadio Arquitecto Ricardo Etcheverry; Referee: Mariano González (Argentina)

8 September 2019 4	Ferro Carril Oeste	0–0	Mitre	Buenos Aires, Argentina
16:00 GMT-3		Vía País; Soccerway		Stadium: Estadio Arquitecto Ricardo Etcheverry; Referee: Julio Barraza (Argentina)

13 September 2019 5	Estudiantes (RC)	2–1	Ferro Carril Oeste	Buenos Aires, Argentina
19:10 GMT-3	E. Martínez 76'; A. Cabrera 89'	Cba24n; Soccerway	L. Pugh 8'	Stadium: Estadio Arquitecto Ricardo Etcheverry; Referee: Héctor Paletta (Argentina)

6	Ferro Carril Oeste	–	Nueva Chicago	Buenos Aires, Argentina
				Stadium: Estadio Arquitecto Ricardo Etcheverry

== Squad statistics ==
=== Appearances and goals ===
No.	Pos.	Nationality	Name	League		Cup		League Cup		Continental		Other		Total		Discipline		Ref
No.	Pos.	Nationality	Name	Apps	Goals	Apps	Goals	Apps	Goals	Apps	Goals	Apps	Goals	Apps	Goals	Yellow card	Red card	Ref
–	GK	Argentina	Andrés Bailo	5	0	—		—		—		0	0	5	0	0	0	
–	GK	Argentina	Luciano Jachfe	0	0	—		—		—		0	0	0	0	0	0	
–	GK	Argentina	Iván López	0	0	—		—		—		0	0	0	0	0	0	
–	CB	Argentina	Nahuel Amarilla	0	0	—		—		—		0	0	0	0	0	0	
–	CB	Argentina	Gustavo Canto	2	0	—		—		—		0	0	2	0	1	0	
–	LB	Argentina	Lucas Ferrari	2	0	—		—		—		0	0	2	0	0	0	
–	RB	Argentina	Hernán Grana	5	0	—		—		—		0	0	5	0	0	0	
–	CB	Argentina	Matías Mariatti	2	0	—		—		—		0	0	2	0	0	0	
–	LB	Argentina	Rodrigo Mazur	3	0	—		—		—		0	0	3	0	1	0	
–	DF	Argentina	Pablo Medina	0	0	—		—		—		0	0	0	0	0	0	
–	CB	Argentina	Guido Milán	3	0	—		—		—		0	0	3	0	1	0	
–	CB	Argentina	Matías Muñoz	0	0	—		—		—		0	0	0	0	0	0	
–	RB	Argentina	Sebastián Olivarez	3(1)	0	—		—		—		0	0	3(1)	0	1	0	
–	DF	Argentina	Lucas Souto	0	0	—		—		—		0	0	0	0	0	0	
–	AM	Argentina	Carlos Airala	0	0	—		—		—		0	0	0	0	0	0	
–	RM	Argentina	Tomás Asprea	1(4)	0	—		—		—		0	0	1(4)	0	0	0	
–	RM	Colombia	Carlos Carbonero	0	0	—		—		—		0	0	0	0	0	0	
–	LM	Argentina	Leonel Álvarez	0	0	—		—		—		0	0	0	0	0	0	
–	MF	Argentina	Cristian Carrizo	0	0	—		—		—		0	0	0	0	0	0	
–	MF	Argentina	Francisco García	0	0	—		—		—		0	0	0	0	0	0	
–	AM	Argentina	Nicolás Gómez	5	0	—		—		—		0	0	5	0	3	0	
–	AM	Argentina	Nahuel Maidana	0(3)	0	—		—		—		0	0	0(3)	0	0	0	
–	CM	Argentina	Fernando Miranda	4	0	—		—		—		0	0	4	0	0	0	
–	RM	Argentina	Federico Murillo	0	0	—		—		—		0	0	0	0	0	0	
–	AM	Argentina	Pablo Ortega	0	0	—		—		—		0	0	0	0	0	0	
–	AM	United States	Adam Ozeri	1	0	—		—		—		0	0	1	0	0	0	
–	MF	Argentina	Federico Segovia	0(1)	0	—		—		—		0	0	0(1)	0	0	0	
–	CM	Argentina	Lautaro Torres	4	0	—		—		—		0	0	4	0	0	0	
–	FW	Argentina	Bruno Barranco	3(1)	0	—		—		—		0	0	3(1)	0	0	0	
–	FW	Argentina	Cristian Bordacahar	5	0	—		—		—		0	0	5	0	0	0	
–	FW	Argentina	Enzo Díaz	0	0	—		—		—		0	0	0	0	0	0	
–	FW	Argentina	Lautaro Gordillo	0(1)	0	—		—		—		0	0	0(1)	0	0	0	
–	FW	Argentina	Matías Ramírez	0	0	—		—		—		0	0	0	0	0	0	
–	FW	Argentina	Lucas Pugh	2	1	—		—		—		0	0	2	1	0	0	
–	RW	Argentina	Franco Pulicastro	1(2)	1	—		—		—		0	0	1(2)	1	0	0	
–	RW	Argentina	Renzo Tesuri	5	1	—		—		—		0	0	5	1	0	0	
Own goals				—	0	—		—		—		—	0	—	0	—	—	—

Statistics accurate as of 14 September 2019.

=== Goalscorers ===
Rank	Pos	No.	Nat	Name	League	Cup	League Cup	Continental	Other	Total	Ref
1	RW	–	Argentina	Renzo Tesuri	1	—	—	—	0	1	
1	RW	–	Argentina	Franco Pulicastro	1	—	—	—	0	1	
1	FW	–	Argentina	Lucas Pugh	1	—	—	—	0	1	
Own goals					0	—	—	—	0	0	
Totals					3	—	—	—	0	3	—
