= Lautaro (disambiguation) =

Lautaro was a 16th-century indigenous leader in what is now Chile.

It may also refer to:

== People ==
- Lautaro Acosta, Argentine footballer
- Lautaro Arellano, Argentine footballer
- Lautaro Baeza, Argentine–Chilean footballer
- Lautaro Bavaro, Argentine rugby union player
- Lautaro Bazán, Argentine rugby union player
- Lautaro Belleggia, Argentine footballer
- Lautaro Bellucca, Argentine musician
- Lautaro Blanco, Argentine footballer
- Lautaro Carrachino, Argentine footballer
- Lautaro Chávez, Argentine footballer
- Lautaro Delgado, Argentine film and TV actor
- Lautaro Díaz, Argentine footballer
- Lautaro Di Lollo, Argentine footballer
- Lautaro Disanto, Argentine footballer
- Lautaro Escalante, Argentine footballer
- Lautaro Fernández, Argentine footballer
- Lautaro Formica, Argentine footballer
- Lautaro Geminiani, Argentine footballer
- Lautaro Giaccone, Argentine footballer
- Lautaro Gianetti, Argentine footballer
- Lautaro Gordillo, Argentine footballer
- Lautaro Guzmán, Argentine footballer
- Lautaro López, Argentine basketball player
- Lautaro Martínez, Argentine footballer
- Lautaro Mesa, Argentine footballer
- Lautaro Midón, Argentine tennis player
- Lautaro Montoya, Argentine footballer
- Lautaro Morales, Argentine footballer
- Lautaro Mur, Argentine footballer
- Lautaro Murúa, Chilean–Argentine film and TV actor
- Lautaro Musiani, Argentine cricketer
- Lautaro Navas, Argentine footballer
- Lautaro Núñez Atencio, Chilean historian
- Lautaro Palacios, Argentine footballer
- Lautaro Parisi, Argentine footballer
- Lautaro Pastrán, Argentine–Chilean footballer
- Lautaro Rinaldi, Argentine footballer
- Lautaro Schinnea, Argentine footballer
- Lautaro Torres, Argentine footballer
- Lautaro Valenti, Argentine footballer

== Institutions ==
- Lautaro Lodge, a lodge created by Francisco de Miranda to promote the emancipation of the South American colonies
- Lautaro de Buin, a Chilean football club

== Places ==
- Lautaro, Chile, a town and municipality in southern Chile's Araucanía Region
- Lautaro (volcano), a volcano in the Southern Patagonian Ice Fields, Chile
- Lautaro Island, an island in the west of Lemaire Island in Gerlache Strait, Antarctic Peninsula

== Ships ==
- There are eight ships of the Chilean Navy named Lautaro: see Chilean ship Lautaro
