= Rodrigo Melo =

Rodrigo Melo may refer to:

- Rodrigo Melo (footballer, born 1982), Brazilian defender
- Rodrigo Melo (footballer, born 1995), Argentine midfielder
