= Rodrigo Godoy =

Rodrigo Godoy may refer to:

- Rodrigo Godoy (Argentine footballer) (born 1989), Argentine football midfielder
- Rodrigo Godoy (Chilean footballer) (born 2005), Chilean football winger
