= Pablo Ortega =

Pablo Ortega may refer to:

- Pablo Ortega (baseball) (born 1976), Mexican pitcher
- Pablo Ortega (footballer) (born 1994), Argentine midfielder
