= Fernando Miranda =

Fernando Miranda may refer to:

- Fernando Miranda y Casellas (1842-1925), Spanish-American sculptor
- Fernando Miranda (sport shooter) (born 1939), Puerto Rican sports shooter
- Fernando Cornejo Miranda (born 1995), Chilean footballer
- Fernando Miranda (footballer) (born 1997), Argentine footballer
