= Leonel Álvarez =

Leonel Álvarez may refer to:

- Leonel Álvarez (footballer, born 1965), Colombian footballer
- Leonel Álvarez (footballer, born 1995), Argentine footballer
- Leonel Álvarez (footballer, born 1996), Argentine footballer
