= Enzo Díaz =

Enzo Díaz may refer to:

- Enzo Díaz (footballer, born 1992), Argentine forward
- Enzo Díaz (footballer, born 1995), Argentine defender
