= Tinari =

Tinari is a surname. Notable people with the surname include:

- Andrew Tinari (born 1995), American soccer player
- Marcelo Tinari (born 1993), Argentine soccer player
- Nancy Tinari (born 1959), Canadian long-distance runner
- Philip Tinari (born 1979), American art critic and curator
