= Maximiliano Serrano =

Argentine footballer

Personal information
- Date of birth: 5 August 1988 (age 38)
- Place of birth: Buenos Aires, Argentina
- Height: 1.79 m (5 ft 10 in)
- Position: Midfielder

Youth career
- Defensores de Belgrano

Senior career*
Years	Team	Apps	(Gls)
2008–2015	Defensores de Belgrano	182	(7)
2016–2018	Almirante Brown	70	(2)
2018–2019	Acassuso	25	(2)
2019	Talleres RE	6	(1)
- * Club domestic league appearances and goals

Maximiliano Serrano (born 5 August 1988) is an Argentine professional footballer who plays as a midfielder.

== Career ==
Defensores de Belgrano were Serrano's first club. He played the opening seven years of his career with the club, participating in one hundred and eighty-five matches whilst scoring seven goals; the final two arrived in a Primera B Metropolitana victory over Platense on 24 August 2013. In January 2016, Serrano was signed by Almirante Brown of the third tier. He featured eight times in the 2016 Primera B Metropolitana campaign, with the midfielder netting his first goal on the final day against Comunicaciones. One goal in fifty-two fixtures followed across the next two seasons.

Serrano joined Acassuso on 30 June 2018. Two goals, against San Telmo and All Boys respectively, followed across twenty-seven matches for the club as they reached the promotion play-offs; though they would lose out to All Boys. July 2019 saw Serrano join fellow Primera B Metropolitana team Talleres. He netted on his second appearance against Deportivo Armenio, which came in the midst of six games for them. He departed midway through the season.

== Career statistics ==
As of 28 October 2020.

Appearances and goals by club, season and competition
Club	Season	League			Cup		League Cup		Continental		Other		Total	
Club	Season	Division	Apps	Goals	Apps	Goals	Apps	Goals	Apps	Goals	Apps	Goals	Apps	Goals
Defensores de Belgrano	2012–13	Primera B Metropolitana	34	2	0	0	—		—		0	0	34	2
Defensores de Belgrano	2013–14	Primera B Metropolitana	34	2	1	0	—		—		0	0	35	2
Defensores de Belgrano	2014	Primera C Metropolitana	18	0	0	0	—		—		0	0	18	0
Defensores de Belgrano	2015	Primera B Metropolitana	40	0	1	0	—		—		2 (Note: Appearance(s) in the Primera B Metropolitana play-offs)	0	43	0
Defensores de Belgrano	Total		126	4	2	0	—		—		2	0	130	4
Almirante Brown	2016	Primera B Metropolitana	18	1	0	0	—		—		0	0	18	1
Almirante Brown	2016–17	Primera B Metropolitana	33	0	0	0	—		—		0	0	33	0
Almirante Brown	2017–18	Primera B Metropolitana	19	1	0	0	—		—		0	0	19	1
Almirante Brown	Total		70	2	0	0	—		—		0	0	70	2
Acassuso	2018–19	Primera B Metropolitana	25	2	0	0	—		—		2	0	27	2
Talleres	2019–20	Primera B Metropolitana	6	1	0	0	—		—		0	0	6	1
Career total			227	9	2	0	—		—		4	0	233	9
