= Ritacco =

Ritacco is an Italian surname. Notable people with the surname include:

- Enzo Ritacco (born 1999), Argentine footballer
- Gonzalo Ritacco (born 1992), Argentine footballer
