= Damián Salvatierra =

Argentine footballer (born 1984)

Personal information
- Full name: Damián Gerardo Salvatierra
- Date of birth: 17 November 1984 (age 41)
- Place of birth: Roque Sáenz Peña, Argentina
- Height: 1.81 m (5 ft 11 in)
- Position: Forward

Senior career*
Years	Team	Apps	(Gls)
2003–2004	Tristán Suárez	10	(1)
2004	Defensores de Belgrano VR	6	(4)
2005–2007	Ituzaingó	39	(10)
2005–2006	→ JJ Urquiza (loan)	19	(4)
2007	Minervén	13	(6)
2008	Monagas	7	(1)
2008–2011	JJ Urquiza	76	(24)
2009–2010	→ Temperley (loan)	23	(4)
2011–2015	Villa Dálmine	103	(38)
2014	→ Acassuso (loan)	19	(8)
2015	→ Ñublense (loan)	8	(1)
2015–2021	Acassuso	138	(34)
2017–2018	→ Barracas Central (loan)	19	(1)
2022	Midland	35	(15)
2023	Claypole	37	(9)
Total		552	(160)
- * Club domestic league appearances and goals

Damián Gerardo Salvatierra (born 17 November 1984) is a former Argentine footballer who played as a forward.

== Career ==
He played for Ñublense.

Salvatierra retired after playing for Claypole in the Primera C.
