= Nicolás Magno =

Argentine footballer

Personal information
- Date of birth: 19 September 1996 (age 30)
- Place of birth: Argentina
- Position: Midfielder

Team information
- Current team: Acassuso

Senior career*
Years	Team	Apps	(Gls)
2016–	Acassuso	21	(0)
- * Club domestic league appearances and goals as of 20:46, 5 April 2019 (UTC)

Nicolás Magno (born 19 September 1996) is an Argentine professional footballer who plays as a midfielder for Acassuso.

== Career ==
Magno started his career in the ranks of Acassuso. He came off the substitutes bench in three Primera B Metropolitana fixtures across the 2016–17 and 2017–18 campaigns, including for his professional debut on 25 October 2016 versus Fénix. Magno's opening career start came in his third campaign, as he played the full duration of a 1–1 home draw with San Miguel in October 2018.

== Career statistics ==
As of 5 April 2019.

Appearances and goals by club, season and competition
Club	Season	League			Cup		Continental		Other		Total	
Club	Season	Division	Apps	Goals	Apps	Goals	Apps	Goals	Apps	Goals	Apps	Goals
Acassuso	2016–17	Primera B Metropolitana	2	0	0	0	—		0	0	2	0
Acassuso	2017–18	Primera B Metropolitana	1	0	0	0	—		0	0	1	0
Acassuso	2018–19	Primera B Metropolitana	18	0	0	0	—		0	0	18	0
Career total			21	0	0	0	—		0	0	21	0
