= Gastón Ada =

Argentine footballer (born 1988)

Personal information
- Full name: Gastón Sebastián Ada
- Date of birth: 18 November 1988 (age 37)
- Place of birth: Vicente López, Argentina
- Height: 1.75 m (5 ft 9 in)
- Positions: Midfielder; forward

Team information
- Current team: Los Andes

Youth career
- Boca Juniors

Senior career*
Years	Team	Apps	(Gls)
2009	Argentinos Juniors	0	(0)
2010	Figueirense	0	(0)
2011–2013	Deportivo Morón	35	(3)
2013–2014	Deportivo Merlo	32	(2)
2014–2015	Acassuso	43	(2)
2016–2017	Juventud Unida	48	(7)
2017–2018	Estudiantes	20	(2)
2018–2019	Ferro Carril Oeste	8	(0)
2019	Deportes Valdivia	5	(1)
2020	Chaco For Ever	6	(0)
2020–2021	San Telmo	25	(2)
2022–	Los Andes	7	(0)
- * Club domestic league appearances and goals as of 14:59, 1 August 2022 (UTC)

Gastón Sebastián Ada (born 18 November 1988) is an Argentine professional footballer who plays as a midfielder or forward for Los Andes.

== Career ==
Ada began in the youth system of Boca Juniors, prior to having senior stints with fellow Argentine Primera División outfit Argentinos Juniors and Brazilian side Figueirense; though no league appearances followed. In 2011, Ada joined Deportivo Morón of Primera B Metropolitana. He netted the first goals of his career during the 2011–12 Primera B Metropolitana campaign, namely against General Lamadrid, Flandria and Nueva Chicago. Ada played just once in the following season, which preceded the player leaving for fellow third tier club Deportivo Merlo. He made the first of thirty-one appearances on 6 August 2013 versus Temperley.

Ada signed for Acassuso in July 2014. He scored two goals in forty‑six fixtures across two seasons with the club. He spent the next two campaigns with Primera B Nacional's Juventud Unida. Seven goals were scored in that period, one of which came in a match with Estudiantes - a team that then signed Ada on 10 August 2017. Ten months after, on 9 June 2018, Ada completed a move to Ferro Carril Oeste. After eight appearances in 2018–19, Ada terminated his contract on 2 August 2019 in order to join Deportes Valdivia of Primera B de Chile on 4 August.

== Career statistics ==
As of 17 October 2023.

Club statistics
Club	Division	League			Cup		Continental		Total	
Club	Division	Season	Apps	Goals	Apps	Goals	Apps	Goals	Apps	Goals
Boca Juniors	Primera División	2007-08	0	0	—		0	0	0	0
Boca Juniors	Primera División	2008-09	0	0	—		0	0	0	0
Boca Juniors	Total		0	0	0	0	0	0	0	0
Argentinos Juniors	Primera División	2009-10	0	0	—		0	0	0	0
Figueirense	Série B	2010	0	0	0	0	0	0	0	0
Deportivo Morón	Primera B Metropolitana	2011-12	14	0	0	0	—		14	0
Deportivo Morón	Primera B Metropolitana	2012-13	21	3	0	0	—		21	3
Deportivo Morón	Total		35	3	0	0	0	0	35	3
Deportivo Merlo	Primera B Metropolitana	2013-14	32	2	0	0	—		32	2
Acassuso	Primera B Metropolitana	2014	15	1	2	0	—		15	1
Acassuso	Primera B Metropolitana	2015	28	1	0	0	—		28	1
Acassuso	Total		43	2	2	0	0	0	45	2
Juventud Unida	Primera B Nacional	2016	17	3	2	0	—		19	3
Juventud Unida	Primera B Nacional	2016-17	31	4	0	0	—		31	4
Juventud Unida	Total		48	7	2	0	0	0	50	7
Estudiantes	Primera B Nacional	2017-18	20	2	0	0	—		20	2
Ferro Carril Oeste	Primera B Nacional	2018-19	8	0	0	0	—		8	0
Deportes Valdivia	Primera B	2019	5	1	0	0	—		5	1
Chaco For Ever	Torneo Federal A	2019-20	6	0	1	0	—		7	0
San Telmo	Primera B Nacional	2021	20	0	2	0	—		22	0
Los Andes	Primera B Metropolitana	2022	12	1	0	0	—		12	1
Nueva Chicago	Primera B Nacional	2023	2	0	0	0	—		2	0
Career total			231	18	7	0	0	0	238	18
