= Emanuel Grespán =

Argentine footballer

Personal information
- Full name: Emanuel Andrés Grespán
- Date of birth: 29 December 1998 (age 27)
- Place of birth: Argentina
- Position: Forward

Team information
- Current team: Ferro Carril Oeste

Youth career
- Ferro Carril Oeste

Senior career*
Years	Team	Apps	(Gls)
2017–	Ferro Carril Oeste	0	(0)
2018–2020	→ Acassuso (loan)	15	(4)
- * Club domestic league appearances and goals as of 13:22, 11 July 2020 (UTC)

Emanuel Andrés Grespán (born 29 December 1998) is an Argentine professional footballer who plays as a forward for Ferro Carril Oeste.

== Career ==
Grespán's career began in the system of Ferro Carril Oeste. He was an unused substitute once during the 2016–17 season in Primera B Nacional, as the club drew 0–0 with Almagro on 27 July 2017. In June 2018, Grespán was loaned to Primera B Metropolitana's Acassuso. He made his senior, professional debut on 8 September off the substitutes bench versus Atlanta, though didn't feature again until the succeeding February when he started a victory over Deportivo Español. He returned to Ferro in June 2020.

== Career statistics ==
As of 11 July 2020.

Appearances and goals by club, season and competition
Club	Season	League			Cup		League Cup		Continental		Other		Total	
Club	Season	Division	Apps	Goals	Apps	Goals	Apps	Goals	Apps	Goals	Apps	Goals	Apps	Goals
Ferro Carril Oeste	2016–17	Primera B Nacional	0	0	0	0	—		—		0	0	0	0
Ferro Carril Oeste	2017–18	Primera B Nacional	0	0	0	0	—		—		0	0	0	0
Ferro Carril Oeste	2018–19	Primera B Nacional	0	0	0	0	—		—		0	0	0	0
Ferro Carril Oeste	2019–20	Primera B Nacional	0	0	0	0	—		—		0	0	0	0
Ferro Carril Oeste	Total		0	0	0	0	—		—		0	0	0	0
Acassuso (loan)	2018–19	Primera B Metropolitana	8	1	1	0	—		—		0	0	9	1
Acassuso (loan)	2019–20	Primera B Metropolitana	7	3	0	0	—		—		0	0	7	3
Acassuso (loan)	Total		15	4	1	0	—		—		0	0	16	4
Career total			15	4	1	0	—		—		0	0	16	4
