= Lucas Ferrari =

Argentine footballer

Personal information
- Date of birth: 31 March 1997 (age 29)
- Place of birth: Argentina
- Height: 1.69 m (5 ft 7 in)
- Position: Left-back

Youth career
- Ferro Carril Oeste

Senior career*
Years	Team	Apps	(Gls)
2019–2021	Ferro Carril Oeste	8	(0)
2021	→ Ciudad de Bolívar (loan)	21	(0)
2022–2023	All Boys	29	(0)
- * Club domestic league appearances and goals as of 16:59, 10 January 2026 (UTC)

Lucas Ferrari (born 31 March 1997) is an Argentine professional footballer who plays as a left-back.

== Career ==
Ferrari got his career underway in the ranks of Ferro Carril Oeste. His first appearance for the club arrived on 3 March 2019 during a win over Mitre at the Estadio Arquitecto Ricardo Etcheverry, participating for sixty-three minutes before being substituted off for Sebastián Olivarez.

After a loan spell at Ciudad de Bolívar in 2021, Ferrari joined All Boys in January 2022. His contract with the club ended on December 31, 2023, and he became a free agent.

== Career statistics ==
As of 4 March 2019.

Appearances and goals by club, season and competition
Club	Season	League			Cup		Continental		Other		Total	
Club	Season	Division	Apps	Goals	Apps	Goals	Apps	Goals	Apps	Goals	Apps	Goals
Ferro Carril Oeste	2018–19	Primera B Nacional	1	0	0	0	—		0	0	1	0
Career total			1	0	0	0	—		0	0	1	0
