= Agustín Benítez =

Argentine footballer

Personal information
- Full name: Matías Agustín Benítez
- Date of birth: 11 October 1999 (age 27)
- Place of birth: Florida, Argentina
- Height: 1.75 m (5 ft 9 in)
- Position: Midfielder

Team information
- Current team: Defensores de Belgrano

Youth career
- –2017: Acassuso

Senior career*
| Years | Team | Apps | (Gls) |
| 2018–2022 | Acassuso | 98 | (7) |
| 2022– | Defensores de Belgrano | 135 | (10) |
- * Club domestic league appearances and goals as of 17:51, 25 April 2026 (UTC)

Matías Agustín Benítez (born 11 October 1999) is an Argentine professional footballer who plays as a midfielder for Defensores de Belgrano.

== Career ==
Benítez got his senior career underway with Acassuso. He came off the bench twice in 2017–18, before making his first start in the subsequent season's opener against Colegiales on 21 August 2018. Four days later, on 25 August, he scored his first goal in a draw versus Comunicaciones. Further goals in fixtures with San Telmo and Almirante Brown followed, as he made eighteen appearances in the first half of 2018–19.

Ahead of the 2022 season, Benítez signed with Primera Nacional side Defensores de Belgrano.

== Career statistics ==
As of 3 April 2019.

Appearances and goals by club, season and competition
| Club | Season | League | | | Cup | | Continental | | Other | | Total | |
| Club | Season | Division | Apps | Goals | Apps | Goals | Apps | Goals | Apps | Goals | Apps | Goals |
|---|---|---|---|---|---|---|---|---|---|---|---|---|
| Acassuso | 2017–18 | Primera B Metropolitana | 2 | 0 | 0 | 0 | — | | 0 | 0 | 2 | 0 |
| Acassuso | 2018–19 | Primera B Metropolitana | 30 | 3 | 0 | 0 | — | | 0 | 0 | 30 | 3 |
| Career total | | | 32 | 3 | 0 | 0 | — | | 0 | 0 | 32 | 3 |
