= Lautaro Schinnea =

Argentine footballer

Personal information
- Date of birth: 14 December 1995 (age 30)
- Place of birth: Argentina
- Height: 1.80 m (5 ft 11 in)
- Position: Forward

Team information
- Current team: Napoli United

Youth career
- 2008–2013: Defensores de Belgrano

Senior career*
Years	Team	Apps	(Gls)
2013–2014	Defensores de Belgrano	1	(0)
2015–2016	Aldosivi	0	(0)
2016–2018	Fénix	46	(8)
2018–2019	Acassuso	21	(0)
2019	JJ Urquiza	7	(0)
2020	Santegidiese		
2020–2021	Afragolese 1944	1	(0)
2021	Biancavilla 1990	2	(0)
2021–	Napoli United		
- * Club domestic league appearances and goals as of 20:23, 12 December 2020 (UTC)

Lautaro Schinnea (born 14 December 1995) is an Argentine professional footballer who plays as a forward for Napoli United.

== Career ==
Schinnea began with Defensores de Belgrano in 2008. He made appearances for the Belgrano outfit in league and cup from 2013, notably featuring in their promotion-winning campaign of 2014 from Primera C Metropolitana. In January 2015, Schinnea completed a move to Aldosivi of the Primera División. He remained for eighteen months but didn't make a first-team appearance. Schinnea was signed by Primera B Metropolitana's Fénix on 30 June 2016. His debut arrived on 28 November against Deportivo Español, in a season which saw him score his opening goal versus Comunicaciones in the succeeding May.

In 2018, after four goals in two seasons for Fénix, Schinnea joined fellow third tier team Acassuso. Twenty-one appearances followed without a goal, though he did only start six times in that period. In July 2019, fellow Primera B Metropolitana team JJ Urquiza signed Schinnea. In January 2020, Schinnea switched Argentina for Italy after penning terms with Promozione side Santegidiese. He scored three goals in the next few months, including a brace against US Miano, before the season's curtailment due to COVID-19. Despite renewing his contract in June, he left in December to Afragolese of Serie D. After one month - and only one appearance in Serie D - Schinnea left Afragolese again and joined Biancavilla 1990 on 9 January 2021. Later during the first months of 2021, Schinnea moved to Eccellenza side Napoli United.

== Career statistics ==
As of 12 December 2020.

Appearances and goals by club, season and competition
Club	Season	League			Cup		League Cup		Continental		Other		Total	
Club	Season	Division	Apps	Goals	Apps	Goals	Apps	Goals	Apps	Goals	Apps	Goals	Apps	Goals
Defensores de Belgrano	2013–14	Primera B Metropolitana	0	0	1	0	—		—		0	0	1	0
Defensores de Belgrano	2014	Primera C Metropolitana	1	0	0	0	—		—		0	0	1	0
Defensores de Belgrano	Total		1	0	1	0	—		—		0	0	2	0
Aldosivi	2015	Primera División	0	0	0	0	—		—		0	0	0	0
Aldosivi	2016	Primera División	0	0	0	0	—		—		0	0	0	0
Aldosivi	Total		0	0	0	0	—		—		0	0	0	0
Fénix	2016–17	Primera B Metropolitana	14	4	0	0	—		—		0	0	14	4
Fénix	2017–18	Primera B Metropolitana	32	4	0	0	—		—		0	0	32	4
Fénix	Total		46	8	0	0	—		—		0	0	46	8
Acassuso	2018–19	Primera B Metropolitana	21	0	0	0	—		—		0	0	21	0
JJ Urquiza	2019–20	Primera B Metropolitana	7	0	0	0	—		—		0	0	7	0
Afragolese	2020–21	Serie D	0	0	0	0	0	0	—		0	0	0	0
Career total			75	8	1	0	0	0	—		0	0	76	8
