= Darío Lema =

Argentine footballer

Personal information
- Full name: Ángel Darío Lema
- Date of birth: 11 October 1976 (age 50)
- Place of birth: Gualeguaychú, Argentina
- Position: Forward

Team information
- Current team: Acassuso (manager)

Youth career
- Central Entrerriano
- Banfield

Senior career*
Years	Team	Apps	(Gls)
1997–1999	Banfield	17	(2)
1999–2002	Brown de Adrogué	71	(36)
2002–2003	Platense	28	(4)
2003–2005	Tristán Suárez	88	(31)
2005	Atlanta	16	(8)
2006	Los Andes	11	(0)
2006–2007	Alvarado	31	(9)
2007	Unión Magdalena		
2008	Cambaceres	8	(2)
2008–2013	Defensores Unidos	168	(66)
2013–2014	Luján	18	(2)

Managerial career
- 2017: Defensores Unidos (youth coordinator)
- 2017: Defensores Unidos
- 2017–2018: Deportivo Español
- 2019–2020: Defensores Unidos
- 2021–2023: Colegiales
- 2023: San Telmo
- 2023: Midland
- 2024: Universidad de Concepción
- 2024: Defensores Unidos
- 2025: Deportivo Armenio
- 2025–: Acassuso
- * Club domestic league appearances and goals

Ángel Darío Lema (born 11 October 1976), known as Darío Lema, is an Argentine football manager and former player who played as a forward. He is the current manager of Acassuso.

== Career ==
Born in Gualeguaychú, Argentina, Lema was with Central Entrerriano before joining Banfield, with whom he made his professional debut in 1997. In his homeland, he also played for clubs such as Brown de Adrogué, Platense, Atlanta, Alvarado, Defensores de Cambaceres, Defensores Unidos, among others.

Abroad, Lema played for Unión Magdalena in the 2007 Colombian Primera B.

His last club was Luján in 2013–14.

== Coaching career ==
Lema started his career with Defensores Unidos in August 2017, after serving as coordinator for the youth ranks. Later, he has led clubs in his homeland such as Colegiales, Deportivo Armenio, among others.

In January 2024, Lema assumed as manager of Chilean club Universidad de Concepción. He was released in April of the same year.

In 2025, Lema assumed as manager of Acassuso.
