= Matías Rojas (footballer, born 1991) =

Argentine professional footballer

Personal information
- Full name: Matías Sebastián Rojas
- Date of birth: 3 January 1991 (age 35)
- Place of birth: Buenos Aires, Argentina
- Height: 1.68 m (5 ft 6 in)
- Position: Midfielder

Team information
- Current team: San Miguel

Senior career*
Years	Team	Apps	(Gls)
2012–2017	Deportivo Armenio	121	(13)
2014	→ Atlanta (loan)	13	(0)
2017–2018	Acassuso	39	(1)
2018	Deportivo Santaní	3	(0)
2019–2021	Acassuso	50	(1)
2022–	San Miguel	96	(2)
- * Club domestic league appearances and goals as of 17:21, 17 August 2025 (UTC)

Matías Sebastián Rojas (born 3 January 1991) is an Argentine footballer who plays as a midfielder for San Miguel.

== Career ==
Rojas began his career with Primera B Metropolitana's Deportivo Armenio. His professional debut arrived on 11 September 2012 when Rojas featured in a match with Atlanta, playing the full duration of a 3–1 defeat. In the final months of 2012–13, Rojas scored his first professional goals in fixtures with Comunicaciones and Flandria. After two seasons in Deportivo Armenio's first-team, Rojas was loaned out to Atlanta for the 2014 Primera B Metropolitana season. Thirteen appearances followed, prior to him returning to his parent club and subsequently featuring in sixty-three matches in the next two and a half years with the club.

2017 saw Rojas complete a move to fellow third tier outfit Acassuso. He was selected just five times in his first campaign of 2016–17, but followed that up with thirty-five appearances and one goal in 2017–18. On 19 June 2018, Rojas joined Paraguayan Primera División side Deportivo Santaní. He departed at the end of December, having made just three appearances for the Paraguayans. A return to Acassuso was sealed in January 2019.

== Career statistics ==
As of 7 April 2019.

Club statistics
Club	Season	League			Cup		Continental		Other		Total	
Club	Season	Division	Apps	Goals	Apps	Goals	Apps	Goals	Apps	Goals	Apps	Goals
Deportivo Armenio	2012–13	Primera B Metropolitana	24	2	3	0	—		0	0	27	2
Deportivo Armenio	2013–14	Primera B Metropolitana	34	3	2	0	—		0	0	36	3
Deportivo Armenio	2014	Primera B Metropolitana	0	0	0	0	—		0	0	0	0
Deportivo Armenio	2015	Primera B Metropolitana	42	4	0	0	—		0	0	42	4
Deportivo Armenio	2016	Primera B Metropolitana	16	3	1	0	—		0	0	17	3
Deportivo Armenio	2016–17	Primera C Metropolitana	5	1	0	0	—		0	0	5	1
Deportivo Armenio	Total		121	13	6	0	—		0	0	127	13
Atlanta (loan)	2014	Primera B Metropolitana	13	0	0	0	—		0	0	13	0
Acassuso	2016–17	Primera B Metropolitana	5	0	0	0	—		0	0	5	0
Acassuso	2017–18	Primera B Metropolitana	34	1	0	0	—		1 (Note: Appearance(s) in the Primera B Metropolitana play-offs)	0	35	1
Acassuso	Total		39	1	0	0	—		1	0	40	1
Deportivo Santaní	2018	Primera División	3	0	0	0	—		0	0	3	0
Acassuso	2018–19	Primera B Metropolitana	9	0	0	0	—		0	0	9	0
Career total			185	14	6	0	—		1	0	192	14
