= Emanuel Pentimalli =

Argentine footballer

Personal information
- Full name: Emanuel Ezequiel Pentimalli
- Date of birth: 10 October 1996 (age 30)
- Place of birth: Argentina
- Position: Midfielder

Team information
- Current team: Puerto Nuevo

Senior career*
Years	Team	Apps	(Gls)
2015–2021	Defensores Unidos	135	(4)
2019–2020	→ Acassuso (loan)	9	(0)
2022–	Puerto Nuevo	8	(0)
- * Club domestic league appearances and goals as of 19:53, 8 August 2022 (UTC)

Emanuel Ezequiel Pentimalli (born 10 October 1996) is an Argentine professional footballer who plays as a midfielder for Puerto Nuevo.

== Career ==
Pentimalli's career started with Defensores Unidos. He made ninety-one appearances and scored two goals in his first three years with the club, which culminated with promotion to Primera B Metropolitana in 2017–18. His opening appearance in the second tier of Argentine football came on 19 August 2018 versus UAI Urquiza, with the midfielder appearing for the 100th time for Defensores Unidos in September against Fénix. His first goal at that level arrived versus Justo José de Urquiza in March 2019. Pentimalli was loaned out in 2019–20 to Acassuso. He made nine appearances before returning to his parent club.

In January 2022, Pentimalli joined Primera C Metropolitana side Puerto Nuevo.

== Career statistics ==
As of 11 July 2020.

Appearances and goals by club, season and competition
Club	Season	League			Cup		League Cup		Continental		Other		Total	
Club	Season	Division	Apps	Goals	Apps	Goals	Apps	Goals	Apps	Goals	Apps	Goals	Apps	Goals
Defensores Unidos	2018–19	Primera B Metropolitana	29	1	1	0	—		—		0	0	30	1
Defensores Unidos	2019–20	Primera B Metropolitana	0	0	0	0	—		—		0	0	0	0
Defensores Unidos	Total		29	1	1	0	—		—		0	0	30	1
Acassuso (loan)	2019–20	Primera B Metropolitana	9	0	0	0	—		—		0	0	9	0
Career total			38	1	1	0	—		—		0	0	39	1

== Honours ==
Defensores Unidos

- Primera C Metropolitana: 2017–18
