= Federico Murillo =

Argentine footballer (born 1997)

Personal information
- Full name: Federico Murillo
- Date of birth: 4 January 1997 (age 29)
- Place of birth: Argentina
- Height: 1.78 m (5 ft 10 in)
- Position: Midfielder

Team information
- Current team: San Martín SJ

Senior career*
Years	Team	Apps	(Gls)
2017–2025	Ferro Carril Oeste	95	(3)
2023	→ Flandria (loan)	31	(4)
2025–2026	San Martín Tucumán	30	(0)
2026–	San Martín SJ	4	(0)
- * Club domestic league appearances and goals as of 18:50, 19 March 2026 (UTC)

Federico Murillo (born 4 January 1997) is an Argentine professional footballer who plays as a midfielder for San Martín SJ.

== Career ==
Murillo began featuring for Ferro Carril Oeste from 2017. He made his senior bow on 25 June during a goalless draw against Villa Dálmine, after he had been an unused substitute on four previous occasions earlier in the 2016–17 Primera B Nacional season. Nine further appearances followed in his second campaign with the club.

== Career statistics ==
As of 5 January 2019.

Club statistics
Club	Season	League			Cup		Continental		Other		Total	
Club	Season	Division	Apps	Goals	Apps	Goals	Apps	Goals	Apps	Goals	Apps	Goals
Ferro Carril Oeste	2016–17	Primera B Nacional	5	0	0	0	—		0	0	5	0
Ferro Carril Oeste	2017–18	Primera B Nacional	9	0	0	0	—		0	0	9	0
Ferro Carril Oeste	2018–19	Primera B Nacional	2	0	0	0	—		0	0	2	0
Career total			16	0	0	0	—		0	0	16	0
