= Lucas Pugh =

Argentine footballer

Personal information
- Full name: Lucas Ramón Pugh
- Date of birth: 1 January 1994 (age 32)
- Place of birth: Avellaneda, Santa Fe, Argentina
- Height: 1.77 m (5 ft 10 in)
- Position: Forward

Team information
- Current team: Ferro Carril Oeste

Senior career*
Years	Team	Apps	(Gls)
2010–2014	River Plate		
2014–2015	Arsenal	3	(0)
2016	Beleneses	0	(0)
2016	Santamarina	11	(0)
2017	Colón		
2018–2019	UiTM		
2019–	Ferro Carril Oeste	3	(1)

International career
2011	Argentina U-17	4	(1)
- * Club domestic league appearances and goals as of 05:30, 22 May 2018 (UTC)

Lucas Ramón Pugh (born 1 January 1994) is an Argentine footballer who plays as a forward for Ferro Carril Oeste.

Pugh had played for Argentina national U-17 team at the 2011 FIFA U-17 World Cup, where he scored 1 goal against Jamaica national U-17 team.
