= Rodrigo Melo (footballer, born 1982) =

Brazilian footballer

Personal information
- Full name: Rodrigo Melo e Lima
- Date of birth: 30 June 1982 (age 44)
- Place of birth: Brazil
- Position: Defender

Youth career
- Botafogo

Senior career*
Years	Team	Apps	(Gls)
2009	Bangu	7	(0)
2009	Quissamã		
- * Club domestic league appearances and goals

Rodrigo Melo e Lima (born 30 June 1982) is a Brazilian former professional footballer who played as a defender.

== Career ==
Melo began in the youth system of Rio de Janeiro club Botafogo. He played for Bangu in the 2009 Campeonato Carioca, making his professional bow against Macaé on 1 February. He was selected six further times for the club. Later that year, Melo joined Second Division side Quissamã. However, he was soon forced to retire due to injury issues.

== Career statistics ==
Club statistics
Club	Season	League			Cup		Continental		Other		Total	
Club	Season	Division	Apps	Goals	Apps	Goals	Apps	Goals	Apps	Goals	Apps	Goals
Bangu	2009	Campeonato Carioca	—		0	0	—		7	0	7	0
Career total			—		0	0	—		7	0	7	0
