= Cristian Bordacahar =

Argentine professional footballer

Personal information
- Full name: Cristian Ariel Bordacahar
- Date of birth: 27 October 1991 (age 35)
- Place of birth: Laprida, Argentina
- Height: 1.80 m (5 ft 11 in)
- Position: Forward

Team information
- Current team: FBC Melgar
- Number: 7

Youth career
- Juventud de Olavarría

Senior career*
Years	Team	Apps	(Gls)
2012–2014	Tigre	20	(1)
2013	→ Brown (Adrogué) (loan)	18	(5)
2014–2016	Chacarita Juniors	26	(9)
2016–2017	Los Andes	38	(5)
2017–2018	Brown (Adrogué)	19	(4)
2018–2020	Ferro Carril Oeste	45	(8)
2021–	Melgar	155	(24)
- * Club domestic league appearances and goals as of 5 March 2026

Cristian Ariel Bordacahar (born 27 October 1991) is an Argentine professional footballer who plays as a forward for FBC Melgar.

== Career ==
Bordacahar started his career with Juventud de Olavarría, before joining Tigre. His first appearances for the club came in the 2011–12 Copa Argentina, with the forward featuring in ties with Gimnasia y Esgrima and Deportivo Merlo. Ahead of January 2013, Bordacahar agreed to join Primera B Metropolitana's Brown on loan. He scored twice in his first three appearances, netting against Central Córdoba and Atlanta. Three further goals followed across a total of twenty-three appearances. Bordacahar returned to Tigre for the 2013–14 Argentine Primera División season, subsequently featuring twenty times for them whilst scoring once.

Bordacahar joined Chacarita Juniors on 12 August 2014. After spending three seasons with Chacarita, two of which in Primera B Nacional after they won promotion in 2014, Bordacahar completed a move to Los Andes which occurred in 2016. A year later saw Bordacahar rejoin former loan team Brown, now plying their trade in the second tier. He scored four goals in his second spell with the club, including one in November 2017 against Ferro Carril Oeste who then signed Bordacahar on 30 June 2018. He made his debut during a defeat to Neuva Chicago in August.

== Career statistics ==
=== Club ===
As of match played 5 March 2026.

Club	Division	Season	League		Cup		Continental		Total
Club	Division	Season	Apps	Goals	Apps	Goals	Apps	Goals	Apps	Goals
Tigre	Primera División	2011-12	0	0	2	0	—		2	0
Tigre	Primera División	2012-13	0	0	—		0	0	0	0
Tigre	Primera División	2013-14	20	1	0	0	—		20	1
Tigre	Total		20	1	2	0	0	0	22	1
Brown (Adrogué)	Primera B Metropolitana	2012-13	23	5	1	0	—		24	5
Brown (Adrogué)	Primera B Nacional	2017-18	19	4	—		—		19	4
Brown (Adrogué)	Total		42	9	1	0	0	0	43	9
Chacarita Juniors	Primera B Metropolitana	2014	17	8	—		—		17	8
Chacarita Juniors	Primera B Nacional	2015	3	0	1	1	—		4	1
Chacarita Juniors	Primera B Nacional	2016	6	1	—		—		6	1
Chacarita Juniors	Total		26	9	1	1	0	0	27	10
Los Andes	Primera B Nacional	2016-17	38	5	2	0	—		40	5
Ferro Carril Oeste	Primera B Nacional	2018-19	20	2	—		—		20	2
Ferro Carril Oeste	Primera B Nacional	2019-20	19	3	—		—		19	3
Ferro Carril Oeste	Primera B Nacional	2020	6	3	—		—		6	3
Ferro Carril Oeste	Total		45	8	0	0	0	0	45	8
Melgar	Liga 1	2021	22	5	1	0	8	3	31	8
Melgar	Liga 1	2022	32	1	—		13	2	45	3
Melgar	Liga 1	2023	34	6	—		6	1	40	7
Melgar	Liga 1	2024	33	7	—		2	1	35	8
Melgar	Liga 1	2025	29	3	—		8	1	37	4
Melgar	Liga 1	2026	5	2	—		1	0	6	2
Melgar	Total		155	24	1	0	38	8	194	32
Career total			326	56	7	1	38	8	371	65

== Honours ==
FBC Melgar

- Torneo Apertura 2022
