= Bruno Barranco =

Argentine professional footballer

Personal information
- Full name: Bruno Ignacio Barranco
- Date of birth: 13 March 1997 (age 29)
- Place of birth: Buenos Aires, Argentina
- Height: 1.76 m (5 ft 9 in)
- Position: Centre-forward

Team information
- Current team: Reggina
- Number: 9

Senior career*
Years	Team	Apps	(Gls)
2016–2020	Ferro Carril Oeste	45	(5)
2020–2021	Olympiacos Volos	0	(0)
2021	→ Doxa Drama (loan)	18	(0)
2021–2022	Verbano		
2022–2023	Stresa Vergante	37	(10)
2023	US Albenga	18	(9)
2023–2024	Folgore Caratese	19	(11)
2024–2025	Reggina	31	(13)
2025–2026	Fasano	28	(6)
- * Club domestic league appearances and goals as of 1 July 2025

Bruno Ignacio Barranco (born 13 March 1997) is an Argentine professional footballer who plays as a Centre-forward for Italian Serie D club Fasano.

== Career ==
=== Ferro Carril Oeste ===
Barranco made his senior debut for Ferro Carril Oeste in 2016. He appeared professionally for the first time in a Primera B Nacional match on 9 December against Brown, having been an unused substitute the previous week versus Atlético Paraná. In July 2017, he scored his first goals, netting against Atlético Paraná and Guillermo Brown. He repeated the tally in the following campaign, scoring twice in seventeen appearances.

In January 2020, Ferro announced that Barranco would join Slovenian Second League side Krško on loan. Although he featured in several friendly matches and scored, the move was never formalised. He returned to Argentina in March and subsequently filed a freedom-of-action claim against Ferro over unpaid wages, while the club lodged a complaint with the AFA regarding the conduct of his representatives and father. He was authorised to leave in July 2020.

=== Olympiacos Volos ===
In September 2020, Barranco moved to Europe, joining Football League Greece side Olympiacos Volos. He did not feature competitively at first due to delays caused by the COVID-19 pandemic.

Ahead of January 2021, it was announced that Barranco would join AEL on a contract running to 2024. However, on 23 December 2020 the transfer was cancelled after the player requested a shorter deal than originally agreed.

On 8 February 2021, Barranco joined Doxa Drama on loan in the Super League 2.

== Career statistics ==
As of 18 May 2021.

Club statistics
Club	Season	League			Cup		League Cup		Continental		Other		Total	
Club	Season	Division	Apps	Goals	Apps	Goals	Apps	Goals	Apps	Goals	Apps	Goals	Apps	Goals
Ferro Carril Oeste	2016–17	Primera B Nacional	8	2	0	0	—				0	0	8	2
Ferro Carril Oeste	2017–18	Primera B Nacional	17	2	0	0	—				0	0	17	2
Ferro Carril Oeste	2018–19	Primera B Nacional	13	1	0	0	—				0	0	13	1
Ferro Carril Oeste	2019–20	Primera B Nacional	7	0	0	0	—				0	0	7	0
Ferro Carril Oeste	Total		45	5	0	0	—				0	0	45	5
Olympiacos Volos	2020–21	Football League	0	0	—								0	0
Doxa Drama (loan)	2020–21	Super League 2	18	0	—								18	0
Career total			63	5	—								63	5
