= Marcelo Tinari =

Argentine footballer

Personal information
- Date of birth: 8 February 1993 (age 33)
- Place of birth: Banfield, Argentina
- Height: 1.79 m (5 ft 10 in)
- Position: Centre back

Team information
- Current team: Acassuso

Youth career
- Banfield
- Los Andes
- 2013–2014: Acassuso

Senior career*
Years	Team	Apps	(Gls)
2014	Acassuso	0	(0)
2014	Almirante Brown	4	(0)
2015	Deportivo Español	0	(0)
2016–2017	Los Andes	2	(0)
2017–2018	Villa Dálmine	4	(0)
2019–	Acassuso	0	(0)
- * Club domestic league appearances and goals as of 21:24, 13 October 2019 (UTC)

Marcelo Tinari (born 8 February 1993) is an Argentine professional footballer who plays as a centre back for Acassuso.

== Career ==
Tinari played for the Banfield and Los Andes academies. In August 2013, Tinari joined Acassuso of Primera B Metropolitana. He remained for eleven months but didn't make a competitive appearance, though was an unused substitute for a Copa Argentina tie on 5 March 2014 with Deportivo Español. In the following July, Tinari joined Almirante Brown. He made his senior bow in the third tier during a draw away to Deportivo Merlo on 21 September, which was the first of four matches he participated in during the 2014 Primera B Metropolitana. Deportivo Español became Tinari's third senior club in January 2015. No appearances followed.

A return to Primera B Nacional's Los Andes was completed on 1 January 2016. He played against All Boys and Central Córdoba in 2016 as they placed ninth. Tinari stayed for the 2016–17 campaign without featuring, prior to signing for Villa Dálmine in August 2017. Felipe De la Riva selected the defender four times either side of the mid-season break, though he wouldn't feature again in 2017–18 after suffering a tibia fracture injury in an encounter with Guillermo Brown on 4 March 2018; which caused the match to be paused for eighteen minutes.

== Career statistics ==
As of 1 April 2019.

Appearances and goals by club, season and competition
Club	Season	League			Cup		Continental		Other		Total	
Club	Season	Division	Apps	Goals	Apps	Goals	Apps	Goals	Apps	Goals	Apps	Goals
Acassuso	2013–14	Primera B Metropolitana	0	0	0	0	—		0	0	0	0
Almirante Brown	2014	Primera B Metropolitana	4	0	0	0	—		0	0	4	0
Deportivo Español	2015	Primera B Metropolitana	0	0	0	0	—		0	0	0	0
Los Andes	2016	Primera B Nacional	2	0	0	0	—		0	0	2	0
Los Andes	2016–17	Primera B Nacional	0	0	0	0	—		0	0	0	0
Los Andes	Total		2	0	0	0	—		0	0	2	0
Villa Dálmine	2017–18	Primera B Nacional	4	0	0	0	—		0	0	4	0
Villa Dálmine	2018–19	Primera B Nacional	0	0	0	0	—		0	0	0	0
Villa Dálmine	Total		4	0	0	0	—		0	0	4	0
Career total			10	0	0	0	—		0	0	10	0
