= Rodrigo Mazur =

Argentine footballer

Personal information
- Full name: Rodrigo Mazur
- Date of birth: 3 January 1992 (age 34)
- Place of birth: Buenos Aires, Argentina
- Height: 1.82 m (6 ft 0 in)
- Position: Left-back

Team information
- Current team: Temperley

Senior career*
Years	Team	Apps	(Gls)
2014–2021	Ferro Carril Oeste	127	(3)
2021	Instituto	31	(3)
2022	Defensores de Belgrano	38	(2)
2023	Resistencia	16	(1)
2023–	Temperley	23	(3)
- * Club domestic league appearances and goals as of 16:50, 27 June 2025 (UTC)

Rodrigo Mazur (born 3 January 1992) is an Argentine professional footballer who plays as a left-back for Temperley.

== Career ==
Ferro Carril Oeste became Mazur's first senior club in 2014. He made his professional debut against Independiente Rivadavia on 26 February, having been an unused substitute days prior versus Atlético Tucumán. In a game with Gimnasia y Esgrima in 2015, in what was his fifty-third appearance, Mazur netted his first goal during a 1–0 win. He made a total of eighty-three appearances and scored thrice in his opening six seasons.

== Personal life ==
Mazur is the brother of fellow professional footballer Federico Mazur.

== Career statistics ==
As of 30 December 2018.

Club statistics
Club	Season	League			Cup		Continental		Other		Total	
Club	Season	Division	Apps	Goals	Apps	Goals	Apps	Goals	Apps	Goals	Apps	Goals
Ferro Carril Oeste	2013–14	Primera B Nacional	3	0	2	0	—		0	0	5	0
Ferro Carril Oeste	2014	Primera B Nacional	13	0	1	0	—		0	0	14	0
Ferro Carril Oeste	2015	Primera B Nacional	37	1	1	0	—		2 (Note: Appearance(s) in the Primera B Nacional play-offs)	0	40	1
Ferro Carril Oeste	2016	Primera B Nacional	13	1	0	0	—		0	0	13	1
Ferro Carril Oeste	2016–17	Primera B Nacional	3	0	1	0	—		0	0	4	0
Ferro Carril Oeste	2017–18	Primera B Nacional	7	1	0	0	—		0	0	7	1
Ferro Carril Oeste	2018–19	Primera B Nacional	13	0	0	0	—		0	0	13	0
Career total			89	3	5	0	—		2	0	96	3
