= Lautaro Mur =

Jugador de fútbol profesional

Lautaro Alen Mur
Personal information
- Date of birth: 7 April 1997 (age 29)
- Place of birth: Buenos Aires, Argentina
- Height: 1.80 m (5 ft 11 in)
- Position: Midfielder

Team information
- Current team: Estudiantes RC

Youth career
- Defensores de Belgrano

Senior career*
Years	Team	Apps	(Gls)
2017–2021	Defensores de Belgrano	22	(2)
2022–	Estudiantes RC	1	(0)
- * Club domestic league appearances and goals as of 18:14, 13 July 2022 (UTC)

Lautaro Mur (born 7 April 1997) is an Argentine professional footballer who plays as a midfielder for Estudiantes RC.

== Career ==
Mur began his career with Defensores de Belgrano. He made his professional debut at the back end of the 2016–17 Primera B Metropolitana season during a defeat to Almirante Brown, which preceded five further appearances as they were eliminated from the promotion play-offs by Estudiantes. He featured just three times in the club's promotion-winning campaign of 2017–18, but did score his first senior goal in the process against Tristán Suárez on 29 November 2017.

In January 2022, Mur moved to fellow league club Estudiantes de Río Cuarto.

== Personal life ==
In September 2020, it was confirmed that Mur had tested positive for COVID-19 amid the pandemic.

== Career statistics ==
As of 25 September 2020.

Club statistics
Club	Season	League			Cup		League Cup		Continental		Other		Total	
Club	Season	Division	Apps	Goals	Apps	Goals	Apps	Goals	Apps	Goals	Apps	Goals	Apps	Goals
Defensores de Belgrano	2016–17	Primera B Metropolitana	6	0	1	0	—		—		0	0	7	0
Defensores de Belgrano	2017–18	Primera B Metropolitana	3	1	0	0	—		—		0	0	3	1
Defensores de Belgrano	2018–19	Primera B Nacional	0	0	0	0	—		—		0	0	0	0
Defensores de Belgrano	2019–20	Primera B Nacional	0	0	0	0	—		—		0	0	0	0
Career total			9	1	1	0	—		—		0	0	10	1
