= Francisco García (footballer, born 1998) =

Argentine footballer

Personal information
- Date of birth: 29 June 1998 (age 28)
- Place of birth: Córdoba, Argentina
- Height: 1.74 m (5 ft 8 1/2 in)
- Position: Midfielder

Team information
- Current team: Ferro Carril Oeste

Youth career
- Escuela de Fútbol Yocsina
- Belgrano
- 2009–2013: Club Renato Cesarini
- 2013–2016: Ferro Carril Oeste

Senior career*
Years	Team	Apps	(Gls)
2016–	Ferro Carril Oeste	2	(0)
- * Club domestic league appearances and goals as of 13:43, 27 August 2020 (UTC)

Francisco García (born 29 June 1998) is an Argentine professional footballer who plays as a midfielder for Ferro Carril Oeste.

== Career ==
García began his senior career with Ferro Carril Oeste, having previously had youth spells with Escuela de Fútbol Yocsina, Belgrano and Club Renato Cesarini. Gustavo Coleoni promoted the midfielder into his first-team squad in December 2016, selecting him for his debut during a scoreless draw at home against Brown on 9 December. He featured again in Primera B Nacional five days later as Ferro lost 4–1 to Guillermo Brown. García suffered a serious ligament injury at the end of 2017, leaving him out of action until August 2018. In May 2019, García signed his first professional contract with the club.

== Career statistics ==
As of 27 August 2020.

Club statistics
Club	Season	League			Cup		League Cup		Continental		Other		Total	
Club	Season	Division	Apps	Goals	Apps	Goals	Apps	Goals	Apps	Goals	Apps	Goals	Apps	Goals
Ferro Carril Oeste	2016–17	Primera B Nacional	2	0	0	0	—		—		0	0	2	0
Ferro Carril Oeste	2017–18	Primera B Nacional	0	0	0	0	—		—		0	0	0	0
Ferro Carril Oeste	2018–19	Primera B Nacional	0	0	0	0	—		—		0	0	0	0
Ferro Carril Oeste	2019–20	Primera B Nacional	0	0	0	0	—		—		0	0	0	0
Career total			2	0	0	0	—		—		0	0	2	0
