= Carlos Airala =

Argentine footballer (born 2002)

Personal information
- Full name: Carlos Javier Airala
- Date of birth: 25 August 2002 (age 24)
- Place of birth: Buenos Aires, Argentina
- Height: 1.73 m (5 ft 8 in)
- Position: Midfielder

Team information
- Current team: Oriental

Senior career*
| Years | Team | Apps | (Gls) |
| 2018–2021 | Ferro Carril Oeste | 12 | (1) |
| 2022–2023 | River Plate II | | |
| 2023– | Racing de Montevideo | 8 | (0) |
| 2024– | → Oriental (loan) | 4 | (1) |
- * Club domestic league appearances and goals as of 14 September 2024

Carlos Javier Airala (born 25 August 2002) is an Argentine footballer who plays as a midfielder for Uruguayan club Oriental on loan from Racing de Montevideo.

== Career statistics ==
=== Club ===
As of 29 May 2020.

| Club | Season | League | | | Cup | | Continental | | Other | | Total | |
| Club | Season | Division | Apps | Goals | Apps | Goals | Apps | Goals | Apps | Goals | Apps | Goals |
|---|---|---|---|---|---|---|---|---|---|---|---|---|
| Ferro Carril Oeste | 2017–18 | Primera B Nacional | 1 | 0 | 0 | 0 | – | | 0 | 0 | 1 | 0 |
| Ferro Carril Oeste | 2018–19 | Primera B Nacional | 0 | 0 | 0 | 0 | – | | 0 | 0 | 0 | 0 |
| Ferro Carril Oeste | 2019–20 | Primera B Nacional | 0 | 0 | 0 | 0 | – | | 0 | 0 | 0 | 0 |
| Career total | | | 1 | 0 | 0 | 0 | 0 | 0 | 0 | 0 | 1 | 0 |
