= Nicolás Gómez (footballer, born 1996) =

Argentine footballer (born 1996)

Personal information
- Full name: Nicolás Gómez
- Date of birth: 25 February 1996 (age 30)
- Place of birth: Argentina
- Position: Midfielder

Team information
- Current team: Ferro Carril Oeste

Youth career
- Ferro Carril Oeste

Senior career*
Years	Team	Apps	(Gls)
2016–	Ferro Carril Oeste	138	(4)
2023	→ Chacarita Juniors (loan)	23	(2)
2025	→ Deportivo Garcilaso (loan)	27	(0)
- * Club domestic league appearances and goals as of 17:28, 11 April 2026 (UTC)

Nicolás Gómez (born 25 February 1996) is an Argentine professional footballer who plays as a midfielder for Ferro Carril Oeste.

== Career ==
Gómez started out with Primera B Nacional side Ferro Carril Oeste. His professional debut arrived during the 2016 season against Gimnasia y Esgrima on 18 June, as he came off the bench for Guillermo Vernetti after seventy-five minutes. He made his first start for the club in July 2017 during a defeat to All Boys.

== Career statistics ==
As of 3 January 2019.

Club statistics
Club	Season	League			Cup		Continental		Other		Total	
Club	Season	Division	Apps	Goals	Apps	Goals	Apps	Goals	Apps	Goals	Apps	Goals
Ferro Carril Oeste	2016	Primera B Nacional	1	0	0	0	—		0	0	1	0
Ferro Carril Oeste	2016–17	Primera B Nacional	2	0	0	0	—		0	0	2	0
Ferro Carril Oeste	2017–18	Primera B Nacional	9	0	0	0	—		0	0	9	0
Ferro Carril Oeste	2018–19	Primera B Nacional	0	0	0	0	—		0	0	0	0
Career total			12	0	0	0	—		0	0	12	0
