= Nahuel Amarilla =

Argentine footballer (born 1996)

Personal information
- Full name: Nahuel Guillermo Amarilla
- Date of birth: 22 May 1996 (age 30)
- Place of birth: Ushuaia, Argentina
- Height: 1.90 m (6 ft 3 in)
- Position: Centre-back

Team information
- Current team: One Taguig
- Number: 32

Youth career
- Mutual Ushuaia
- Los Andes Ushuaia
- Educación Fueguina
- Academia Griffa

Senior career*
Years	Team	Apps	(Gls)
2015–2020	Ferro Carril Oeste	11	(0)
2018	→ Club Sol de Mayo (loan)	0	(0)
2018–2019	→ Colegiales (loan)	8	(0)
2020	San Martín de Formosa	2	(0)
2021	Gimnasia Concepción	7	(0)
2021–2022	Juventud Unida	7	(0)
2023	Tacuarembó	6	(0)
2023–2024	Juve Pergamino	10	(0)
2024	San Martín de Formosa	9	(0)
2025	One Taguig	16	(0)
2025	Aguilas–UMak	5	(0)
2026	Andranik	0	(0)
- * Club domestic league appearances and goals as of 11 March 2026

Nahuel Guillermo Amarilla (born 22 May 1996) is an Argentine professional footballer who plays as a centre-back for Philippines Football League club One Taguig.

== Career ==
Amarilla played the early years of his youth in Ushuaia with Mutual, Los Andes and Educación Fueguina, which preceded a move to Rosario with Academia Griffa. He started his senior career with Ferro Carril Oeste in Primera B Nacional. After being an unused substitute for fixtures across 2015 and 2016 with Atlético Paraná and Almagro, Amarilla made his senior debut on 18 June 2016 during a defeat to Gimnasia y Esgrima. He was on the bench fifteen times in 2016–17, though did appear four times; including for the first time as a starter on 21 June 2017 versus Douglas Haig on home soil.

Amarilla left on 17 July 2018 to Club Sol de Mayo of Torneo Federal A on loan. However, the deal was terminated a month later as Amarilla agreed a loan to Primera B Metropolitana's Colegiales. He spent the 2018–19 campaign with the club, though made just two competitive appearances. Amarilla terminated his Ferro contract on 20 February 2020, as he subsequently joined San Martín de Formosa. He appeared in Torneo Federal A against Sportivo Las Parejas and Atlético Güemes in March, before the league's curtailment due to the COVID-19 pandemic.

== Career statistics ==
As of 2 January 2021.

Appearances and goals by club, season and competition
Club	Season	League			Cup		League Cup		Continental		Other		Total	
Club	Season	Division	Apps	Goals	Apps	Goals	Apps	Goals	Apps	Goals	Apps	Goals	Apps	Goals
Ferro Carril Oeste	2015	Primera B Nacional	0	0	0	0	—		—		0	0	0	0
Ferro Carril Oeste	2016	Primera B Nacional	1	0	0	0	—		—		0	0	1	0
Ferro Carril Oeste	2016–17	Primera B Nacional	4	0	0	0	—		—		0	0	4	0
Ferro Carril Oeste	2017–18	Primera B Nacional	0	0	0	0	—		—		0	0	0	0
Ferro Carril Oeste	2018–19	Primera B Nacional	0	0	0	0	—		—		0	0	0	0
Ferro Carril Oeste	2019–20	Primera B Nacional	0	0	0	0	—		—		0	0	0	0
Ferro Carril Oeste	Total		5	0	0	0	—		—		0	0	5	0
Club Sol de Mayo (loan)	2018–19	Torneo Federal A	0	0	0	0	—		—		0	0	0	0
Colegiales (loan)	2018–19	Primera B Metropolitana	2	0	0	0	—		—		0	0	2	0
San Martín de Formosa	2019–20	Torneo Federal A	2	0	0	0	—		—		0	0	2	0
Career total			9	0	0	0	—		—		0	0	9	0
