= Matías Ramírez (footballer, born 1999) =

Argentine footballer

Personal information
- Full name: Claudio Matías Ramírez
- Date of birth: 14 March 1999 (age 27)
- Place of birth: Pontevedra, Argentina
- Height: 1.83 m (6 ft 0 in)
- Position: Attacking midfielder

Team information
- Current team: Godoy Cruz

Youth career
- Club Master

Senior career*
Years	Team	Apps	(Gls)
2016–2021	Ferro Carril Oeste	22	(1)
2019–2020	→ Villa Dálmine (loan)	3	(0)
2021–	Godoy Cruz	70	(3)
2023	→ Banfield (loan)	3	(0)
2024	→ Gimnasia LP (loan)	7	(0)
2024–2025	→ Defensa y Justicia (loan)	21	(2)
2025	→ Águilas Doradas (loan)	16	(1)
- * Club domestic league appearances and goals as of 19:06, 18 March 2026 (UTC)

Claudio Matías Ramírez (born 14 March 1999) is an Argentine professional footballer who plays as an attacking midfielder for Godoy Cruz.

== Club career ==
Ramírez's career started in 2016 with Ferro Carril Oeste, who had signed him from Club Master. A Primera B Nacional fixture with All Boys on 19 December saw Ramírez make his professional bow, coming off the bench at half-time for Facundo Affranchino as they won 3–1. He made six further appearances throughout the 2016–17 campaign, before featuring five times in 2017–18. After participating twice in 2018–19, Ramírez spent 2019–20 out on loan with Villa Dálmine. He made just three appearances, all off the bench against Sarmiento, Chacarita Juniors and Santamarina before returning to his parent club.

After scoring his first senior goal on what would be his final appearance for the club against Gimnasia y Esgrima on 17 January 2021, Ramírez terminated his contract with Ferro on 19 February in order to join Primera División side Godoy Cruz. After the player rejected advancements from Ferro for a new contract, which would've expired on 30 June, the two clubs agreed on a compensation deal worth $30,000.

== International career ==
In May 2018, Ramírez was called up by the Argentina U19s for a friendly with Shandong Luneng U21s; a match which launched a cooperative agreement between the AFA and their Chinese counterparts.

== Career statistics ==
As of 26 February 2021.

Club statistics
Club	Season	League			Cup		League Cup		Continental		Other		Total	
Club	Season	Division	Apps	Goals	Apps	Goals	Apps	Goals	Apps	Goals	Apps	Goals	Apps	Goals
Ferro Carril Oeste	2016–17	Primera B Nacional	7	0	0	0	—		—		0	0	7	0
Ferro Carril Oeste	2017–18	Primera B Nacional	5	0	0	0	—		—		0	0	5	0
Ferro Carril Oeste	2018–19	Primera B Nacional	2	0	0	0	—		—		0	0	2	0
Ferro Carril Oeste	2019–20	Primera B Nacional	0	0	0	0	—		—		0	0	0	0
Ferro Carril Oeste	2020	Primera B Nacional	8	1	0	0	—		—		0	0	8	1
Ferro Carril Oeste	Total		22	1	0	0	—		—		0	0	22	1
Villa Dálmine (loan)	2019–20	Primera B Nacional	3	0	0	0	—		—		0	0	3	0
Godoy Cruz	2021 (Note: Soccerway counts Copa de la Liga Profesional appearances as league appearances.)	Primera División	0	0	0	0	—		—		0	0	0	0
Career total			25	1	0	0	—		—		0	0	25	1
