= Augusto Vantomme =

Argentine footballer

Personal information
- Full name: Augusto Marcelo Vantomme
- Date of birth: 23 June 1990 (age 36)
- Place of birth: Buenos Aires, Argentina
- Position: Goalkeeper

Team information
- Current team: Jonava

Youth career
- San Lorenzo
- Banfield
- Independiente
- Sportivo Italiano

Senior career*
Years	Team	Apps	(Gls)
2011–2014	Victoriano Arenas	55	(0)
2015–2018	San Miguel	64	(0)
2018–2019	Ferro Carril Oeste	0	(0)
2019–	Acassuso	7	(0)
2022–	Acassuso	10	(0)
- * Club domestic league appearances and goals as of 1 October 2022 (UTC)

Augusto Marcelo Vantomme (born 23 June 1990) is an Argentine professional footballer who plays as a goalkeeper for FK Jonava.

== Career ==
Vantomme had youth stints with San Lorenzo, Banfield, Independiente and Sportivo Italiano before beginning his senior career with Victoriano Arenas in 2011. He remained with the Primera D Metropolitana club for three years whilst appearing fifty-five times. In 2015, Vantomme completed a move to Primera C Metropolitana's San Miguel. Thirty appearances followed across his first three seasons, with the club winning promotion to Primera B Metropolitana in the latter. His professional bow subsequently came during a 1–1 home draw versus San Telmo. Ahead of the 2018–19 Primera B Nacional campaign, Vantomme joined Ferro Carril Oeste.

== Career statistics ==
As of 30 December 2018.

Club statistics
Club	Season	League			Cup		Continental		Other		Total	
Club	Season	Division	Apps	Goals	Apps	Goals	Apps	Goals	Apps	Goals	Apps	Goals
San Miguel	2017–18	Primera B Metropolitana	34	0	0	0	—		0	0	34	0
Ferro Carril Oeste	2018–19	Primera B Nacional	0	0	0	0	—		0	0	0	0
Career total			34	0	0	0	—		0	0	34	0
