= Matías Muñoz =

Argentine footballer (born 1996)

Personal information
- Full name: Matías Damián Muñoz Sevilla
- Date of birth: 22 March 1996 (age 30)
- Place of birth: Río Gallegos, Argentina
- Position: Centre-back

Team information
- Current team: Colón (on loan from Gimnasia de Mendoza)

Youth career
- Boxing Club
- Racing Club

Senior career*
Years	Team	Apps	(Gls)
2016–2021	Ferro Carril Oeste	7	(0)
2018–2019	→ Colegiales (loan)	23	(3)
2020–2021	→ Tristán Suárez (loan)	40	(1)
2022–2024	All Boys	60	(1)
2024	→ Unión La Calera (loan)	24	(1)
2025–	Gimnasia de Mendoza	32	(2)
2026–	→ Colón (loan)	4	(0)
- * Club domestic league appearances and goals as of 18:42, 20 March 2026 (UTC)

Matías Damián Muñoz Sevilla (born 22 March 1996) is an Argentine professional footballer who plays as a centre-back for Colón, on loan from Gimnasia de Mendoza.

== Career ==
Muñoz played for the youth set-ups of Boxing Club and Racing Club. His senior career started with Ferro Carril Oeste, making his debut during a 3–1 victory over All Boys on 19 December 2016 in Primera B Nacional. His only other appearance in 2016–17 came against the same opponents in the succeeding July, in a fixture which saw the defender receive his first career red card; he was sent off again in 2017–18 versus Independiente Rivadavia. In November 2018, Muñoz joined Colegiales of Primera B Metropolitana on loan. He scored his first goal during his fourth game away to Deportivo Español on 4 December.

Muñoz returned to Ferro for 2019–20, a campaign that would see him appear just once for the club. In October 2020, Muñoz was loaned back to Primera B Metropolitana with Tristán Suárez.

In January 2022, Muñoz joined Primera Nacional side All Boys.

In January 2024, he moved to Chile and joined on loan to Unión La Calera on a one-year deal with an option to buy.

Ended his contract with All Boys, Muñoz signed with Gimnasia y Esgrima de Mendoza in January 2025. The next season, he was loaned out to Colón for a year with an option to buy.

== Career statistics ==
As of 21 October 2020.

Appearances and goals by club, season and competition
Club	Season	League			Cup		League Cup		Continental		Other		Total	
Club	Season	Division	Apps	Goals	Apps	Goals	Apps	Goals	Apps	Goals	Apps	Goals	Apps	Goals
Ferro Carril Oeste	2016–17	Primera B Nacional	2	0	0	0	—		—		0	0	2	0
Ferro Carril Oeste	2017–18	Primera B Nacional	4	0	0	0	—		—		0	0	4	0
Ferro Carril Oeste	2018–19	Primera B Nacional	0	0	0	0	—		—		0	0	0	0
Ferro Carril Oeste	2019–20	Primera B Nacional	1	0	0	0	—		—		0	0	1	0
Ferro Carril Oeste	2020–21	Primera B Nacional	0	0	0	0	—		—		0	0	0	0
Ferro Carril Oeste	Total		7	0	0	0	—		—		0	0	7	0
Colegiales (loan)	2018–19	Primera B Metropolitana	23	3	0	0	—		—		2 (Note: Appearance(s) in the Primera B Metropolitana play-offs)	0	25	3
Tristán Suárez (loan)	2020–21	Primera B Metropolitana	0	0	0	0	—		—		0	0	0	0
Career total			30	3	0	0	—		—		2	0	32	3

== Personal life ==
Muñoz is of Chilean descent since his grandmother is a Chilean from Punta Arenas. He got the Chilean nationality in January 2024.
