= Leonel Álvarez (footballer, born 1996) =

Argentine footballer (born 1996)

Personal information
- Full name: Leonel Dante Álvarez
- Date of birth: 25 March 1996 (age 30)
- Place of birth: San Pedro de Jujuy, Argentina
- Height: 1.66 m (5 ft 5 in)
- Position: Midfielder

Team information
- Current team: San Martín SJ
- Number: 3

Youth career
- Ferro Carril Oeste

Senior career*
Years	Team	Apps	(Gls)
2016–2020	Ferro Carril Oeste	29	(0)
2018–2020	→ Flandria (loan)	52	(2)
2020–2021	Guillermo Brown	6	(0)
2021–2022	Belgrano	10	(0)
2022–	San Martín SJ	86	(0)
- * Club domestic league appearances and goals as of 16:42, 23 November 2025 (UTC)

Leonel Dante Álvarez (born 25 March 1996) is an Argentine professional footballer who plays as a midfielder for San Martín SJ.

== Career ==
Álvarez made his professional debut with Ferro Carril Oeste of Primera B Nacional in 2016, coming on as a late substitute in a 2–2 draw with Brown on 21 March. Eleven more appearances followed in his first season of 2016, prior to fourteen appearances in 2016–17. Álvarez was loaned to Primera B Metropolitana's Flandria in July 2018. He remained for the next two seasons, making fifty-two appearances and scoring two goals; against All Boys and Acassuso respectively. In August 2020, Álvarez signed for Primera B Nacional's Guillermo Brown on a free transfer.

After a spell at Belgrano in 2021, Álvarez moved to Primera Nacional club San Martín de San Juan ahead of the 2022 season.

== Career statistics ==
As of 28 September 2020.

Club statistics
Club	Season	League			Cup		League Cup		Continental		Other		Total	
Club	Season	Division	Apps	Goals	Apps	Goals	Apps	Goals	Apps	Goals	Apps	Goals	Apps	Goals
Ferro Carril Oeste	2016	Primera B Nacional	12	0	1	0	—		—		0	0	13	0
Ferro Carril Oeste	2016–17	Primera B Nacional	14	0	1	0	—		—		0	0	15	0
Ferro Carril Oeste	2017–18	Primera B Nacional	3	0	0	0	—		—		0	0	3	0
Ferro Carril Oeste	2018–19	Primera B Nacional	0	0	0	0	—		—		0	0	0	0
Ferro Carril Oeste	2019–20	Primera B Nacional	0	0	0	0	—		—		0	0	0	0
Ferro Carril Oeste	Total		29	0	2	0	—		—		0	0	31	0
Flandria (loan)	2018–19	Primera B Metropolitana	29	2	0	0	—		—		0	0	29	2
Flandria (loan)	2019–20	Primera B Metropolitana	23	0	0	0	—		—		0	0	23	0
Flandria (loan)	Total		52	2	0	0	—		—		0	0	52	2
Guillermo Brown	2020–21	Primera B Nacional	0	0	0	0	—		—		0	0	0	0
Career total			81	2	2	0	—		—		0	0	83	2
