= Nahuel Maidana =

Argentine footballer (born 1998)

Personal information
- Full name: Cristian Nahuel Maidana
- Date of birth: 7 April 1998 (age 28)
- Place of birth: Buenos Aires, Argentina
- Position: Midfielder

Team information
- Current team: Chacarita Juniors (on loan from Ferro Carril Oeste)

Youth career
- Ferro Carril Oeste

Senior career*
Years	Team	Apps	(Gls)
2019–	Ferro Carril Oeste	40	(2)
2022–	→ Chacarita Juniors (loan)	4	(0)
- * Club domestic league appearances and goals as of 16:29, 11 July 2022 (UTC)

Cristian Nahuel Maidana (born 7 April 1998) is an Argentine professional footballer who plays as a midfielder for Chacarita Juniors, on loan from Ferro Carril Oeste.

== Career ==
Maidana's senior career began with Ferro Carril Oeste, with the midfielder being moved into their senior squad during the 2018–19 season and initially being on the substitutes bench against Instituto and Temperley in February 2019. Interim manager Jorge Cordon selected Maidana for his senior bow on 3 March during a 2–0 victory at home to Mitre. On 11 June 2022, Maidana joined Chacarita Juniors on a one-year loan.

== Career statistics ==
As of 4 March 2019.

Appearances and goals by club, season and competition
Club	Season	League			Cup		Continental		Other		Total	
Club	Season	Division	Apps	Goals	Apps	Goals	Apps	Goals	Apps	Goals	Apps	Goals
Ferro Carril Oeste	2018–19	Primera B Nacional	1	0	0	0	—		0	0	1	0
Career total			1	0	0	0	—		0	0	1	0
