= Lautaro Gordillo =

Argentine footballer

Personal information
- Date of birth: 6 April 1999 (age 27)
- Place of birth: Argentina
- Height: 1.75 m (5 ft 9 in)
- Position: Forward

Team information
- Current team: Gimnasia y Tiro (on loan from Colegiales)

Youth career
- Ferro Carril Oeste

Senior career*
Years	Team	Apps	(Gls)
2018–2023	Ferro Carril Oeste	23	(2)
2020	→ Flandria (loan)	8	(0)
2020–2022	→ Flandria (loan)	45	(21)
2023–2024	San Martín SJ	13	(0)
2024–2025	Gimnasia y Tiro	29	(5)
2025–	Colegiales	15	(2)
2025–	→ Gimnasia y Tiro (loan)	23	(9)
- * Club domestic league appearances and goals as of 18:11, 28 April 2026 (UTC)

Lautaro Gordillo (born 6 April 1999) is an Argentine professional footballer who plays as a forward for Gimnasia y Tiro, on loan from Colegiales.

== Career ==
Gordillo began his career with Ferro Carril Oeste. He was selected for his professional debut on 6 April 2018 against Deportivo Riestra, with the forward being substituted on for Lautaro Torres on eighty-two minutes. After six total appearances off the bench for the club, Gordillo left on loan in January 2020 to Flandria of Primera B Metropolitana. He appeared for his debut on 2 February against Argentino, before making the first start of his career five days later versus Defensores Unidos. Gordillo returned to Ferro on 1 July, though would rejoin Flandria on 23 September; having extended his contract with his parent club.

== Career statistics ==
As of 25 September 2020.

Club statistics
Club	Season	League			Cup		League Cup		Continental		Other		Total	
Club	Season	Division	Apps	Goals	Apps	Goals	Apps	Goals	Apps	Goals	Apps	Goals	Apps	Goals
Ferro Carril Oeste	2017–18	Primera B Nacional	1	0	0	0	—		—		0	0	1	0
Ferro Carril Oeste	2018–19	Primera B Nacional	4	0	0	0	—		—		0	0	4	0
Ferro Carril Oeste	2019–20	Primera B Nacional	1	0	0	0	—		—		0	0	1	0
Ferro Carril Oeste	2020–21	Primera B Nacional	0	0	0	0	—		—		0	0	0	0
Ferro Carril Oeste	Total		6	0	0	0	—		—		0	0	6	0
Flandria (loan)	2019–20	Primera B Metropolitana	8	0	0	0	—		—		0	0	8	0
Flandria (loan)	2020–21	Primera B Metropolitana	0	0	0	0	—		—		0	0	0	0
Flandria (loan)	Total		8	0	0	0	—		—		0	0	8	0
Career total			14	0	0	0	—		—		0	0	14	0
