= Enzo Ritacco =

Argentine footballer

Personal information
- Full name: Enzo Agustín Ritacco
- Date of birth: 5 May 1999 (age 27)
- Place of birth: Argentina
- Position: Midfielder

Team information
- Current team: Acassuso

Youth career
- Acassuso

Senior career*
Years	Team	Apps	(Gls)
2018–	Acassuso	1	(0)
- * Club domestic league appearances and goals as of 14:58, 7 April 2019 (UTC)

Enzo Agustín Ritacco (born 5 May 1999) is an Argentine professional footballer who plays as a midfielder for Acassuso.

== Career ==
Ritacco's career began with Primera B Metropolitana's Acassuso. He was selected for his professional debut by manager Rodolfo Della Picca in October 2018, as he came off the substitutes bench in a league victory in Dock Sud over San Telmo.

== Career statistics ==
As of 7 April 2019.

Appearances and goals by club, season and competition
Club	Season	League			Cup		Continental		Other		Total	
Club	Season	Division	Apps	Goals	Apps	Goals	Apps	Goals	Apps	Goals	Apps	Goals
Acassuso	2018–19	Primera B Metropolitana	1	0	0	0	—		0	0	1	0
Career total			1	0	0	0	—		0	0	1	0
