= Andrés Bailo =

Argentine footballer

Personal information
- Full name: Andrés Germán Bailo
- Date of birth: 6 September 1988 (age 38)
- Place of birth: Santa Fe, Argentina
- Height: 1.90 m (6 ft 3 in)
- Position: Goalkeeper

Team information
- Current team: Ferro Carril Oeste

Youth career
- Colón

Senior career*
Years	Team	Apps	(Gls)
2008–2016	Colón	6	(0)
2008–2009	→ Sportivo Belgrano (loan)	30	(0)
2015	→ Sportivo Belgrano (loan)	26	(0)
2016–	Ferro Carril Oeste	77	(0)
- * Club domestic league appearances and goals as of 01:29, 29 December 2018 (UTC)

Andrés Germán Bailo (born 6 September 1988) is an Argentine professional footballer who plays as a goalkeeper for Ferro Carril Oeste.

== Career ==
=== Club ===
Colón were Bailo's first team. In 2008, he agreed a loan stint with Torneo Argentino B's Sportivo Belgrano. Bailo appeared thirty-two times for them, including in the play-offs, as they secured promotion up to Torneo Argentino A. His Colón debut subsequently arrived on 24 February 2013 during a defeat to Belgrano; he had previously been an unused substitute twenty-one times that season. Bailo featured in further fixtures with Estudiantes, Tigre, Argentinos Juniors and Independiente in 2012–13. After just one appearance across the following two seasons, Bailo left to rejoin Sportivo Belgrano on loan for a second time.

Bailo participated in twenty-six fixtures back with the club, with his last appearance arriving on 15 November 2015 versus Santamarina as Sportivo Belgrano's relegation to Torneo Federal A was confirmed. He departed Colón permanently on 31 August 2016, with Ferro Carril Oeste of Primera B Nacional completing the signing of Bailo. Forty appearances occurred in his opening campaign as they finished ninth.

=== International ===
In 2005, Bailo received a call-up to Argentina's squad for the South American U-17 Championship in Venezuela.

== Career statistics ==
As of 29 December 2018.

Club statistics
Club	Season	League			Cup		Continental		Other		Total	
Club	Season	Division	Apps	Goals	Apps	Goals	Apps	Goals	Apps	Goals	Apps	Goals
Colón	2008–09	Primera División	0	0	0	0	—		0	0	0	0
Colón	2009–10	Primera División	0	0	0	0	0	0	0	0	0	0
Colón	2010–11	Primera División	0	0	0	0	—		0	0	0	0
Colón	2011–12	Primera División	0	0	0	0	0	0	0	0	0	0
Colón	2012–13	Primera División	5	0	0	0	—		0	0	5	0
Colón	2013–14	Primera División	1	0	0	0	—		0	0	1	0
Colón	2014	Primera B Nacional	0	0	0	0	—		0	0	0	0
Colón	2015	Primera División	0	0	0	0	—		0	0	0	0
Colón	2016	Primera División	0	0	0	0	—		0	0	0	0
Colón	2016–17	Primera División	0	0	0	0	—		0	0	0	0
Colón	Total		6	0	0	0	0	0	0	0	6	0
Sportivo Belgrano (loan)	2008–09	Torneo Argentino B	30	0	0	0	—		2 (Note: Appearance(s) in the Torneo Argentino B play-offs)	0	32	0
Sportivo Belgrano (loan)	2015	Primera B Nacional	26	0	0	0	—		0	0	26	0
Sportivo Belgrano (loan)	Total		56	0	0	0	—		2	0	58	0
Ferro Carril Oeste	2016–17	Primera B Nacional	40	0	0	0	—		0	0	40	0
Ferro Carril Oeste	2017–18	Primera B Nacional	24	0	0	0	—		0	0	24	0
Ferro Carril Oeste	2018–19	Primera B Nacional	13	0	0	0	—		0	0	13	0
Ferro Carril Oeste	Total		77	0	0	0	—		0	0	77	0
Career total			139	0	0	0	0	0	2	0	141	0
