= Iván López (footballer, born 1996) =

Argentine footballer

Personal information
- Full name: Iván Gabriel López
- Date of birth: 17 February 1996 (age 30)
- Place of birth: Argentina
- Height: 1.87 m (6 ft 2 in)
- Position: Goalkeeper

Team information
- Current team: Deportivo Armenio

Senior career*
Years	Team	Apps	(Gls)
2016–2022	Ferro Carril Oeste	9	(0)
2020–2021	→ San Miguel (loan)	36	(0)
2022	→ Sacachispas (loan)	0	(0)
2023–	Deportivo Armenio	19	(0)
- * Club domestic league appearances and goals as of 18:53, 26 June 2023 (UTC)

Iván Gabriel López (born 17 February 1996) is an Argentine professional footballer who plays as a goalkeeper for Deportivo Armenio.

== Career ==
López started his career with Ferro Carril Oeste, with Walter Perazzo promoting the goalkeeper into his senior squad during the 2016 season. Having been an unused substitute for a fixture with Villa Dálmine on 19 April, López made his professional debut days later as they drew against Juventud Unida Universitario away from home. He participated in nine further matches in all competitions throughout that campaign.

== Career statistics ==
As of 29 December 2018.

Club statistics
Club	Season	League			Cup		Continental		Other		Total	
Club	Season	Division	Apps	Goals	Apps	Goals	Apps	Goals	Apps	Goals	Apps	Goals
Ferro Carril Oeste	2016	Primera B Nacional	9	0	1	0	—		0	0	10	0
Ferro Carril Oeste	2016–17	Primera B Nacional	0	0	0	0	—		0	0	0	0
Ferro Carril Oeste	2017–18	Primera B Nacional	0	0	0	0	—		0	0	0	0
Ferro Carril Oeste	2018–19	Primera B Nacional	0	0	0	0	—		0	0	0	0
Career total			9	0	1	0	—		0	0	10	0
