= Leonardo Landriel =

Argentine footballer

Personal information
- Full name: Leonardo Emanuel Landriel
- Date of birth: 14 July 1996 (age 30)
- Place of birth: Florencio Varela, Argentina
- Height: 1.70 m (5 ft 7 in)
- Position: Midfielder

Team information
- Current team: Defensores de Belgrano

Senior career*
Years	Team	Apps	(Gls)
2014–2017	Defensa y Justicia	0	(0)
2016	→ Berazategui (loan)	11	(0)
2017–2018	UAI Urquiza	8	(0)
2018–2019	Ferro Carril Oeste	8	(0)
2019–2020	Los Andes	16	(1)
2020–2022	Colegiales	38	(6)
2022–2026	Deportivo Riestra	71	(0)
2026–	Defensores de Belgrano	10	(0)
- * Club domestic league appearances and goals as of 16:54, 4 October 2026 (UTC)

Leonardo Emanuel Landriel (born 14 July 1996) is an Argentine professional footballer who plays as a midfielder for Defensores de Belgrano.

== Career ==
Leonardo Emanuel Landriel began his professional football career at Defensa y Justicia, although he did not make a first-team appearance. He was named on the substitutes' bench once, for a match against Olimpo on 6 December 2014. In 2016, Landriel was loaned to Berazategui in the Primera C Metropolitana, where he made 11 appearances. On 31 August 2017, Landriel joined UAI Urquiza in the Primera B Metropolitana. His first appearance for the club came in March 2018, and he scored his first senior goal on 15 May 2018 in a match against Estudiantes. In June 2018, he transferred to Ferro Carril Oeste of the Primera B Nacional, where he made eight appearances. In July 2019, Landriel moved to Los Andes, scoring on his first start for the club on 16 September 2019 against his former team, UAI Urquiza. In August 2020, Landriel joined Colegiales, where he made 38 appearances and scored six goals. Ahead of the 2022 season, Landriel signed with Deportivo Riestra, a Primera B Metropolitana club. As of 2024, he has become a regular starter, contributing significantly to their midfield and participating in numerous league matches.

After eight appearances for Ferro, Landriel headed to Los Andes in July 2019. He scored on his first start for the club on 16 September against former club UAI Urquiza. August 2020 saw Landriel join fellow Primera B Metropolitana team Colegiales. Ahead of the 2022 season, Landriel signed with Deportivo Riestra.

== Career statistics ==
As of 28 September 2020.

Club statistics
Club	Season	League			Cup		League Cup		Continental		Other		Total	
Club	Season	Division	Apps	Goals	Apps	Goals	Apps	Goals	Apps	Goals	Apps	Goals	Apps	Goals
Defensa y Justicia	2014	Primera División	0	0	0	0	—		—		0	0	0	0
Defensa y Justicia	2015	Primera División	0	0	0	0	—		—		0	0	0	0
Defensa y Justicia	2016	Primera División	0	0	0	0	—		—		0	0	0	0
Defensa y Justicia	2016–17	Primera División	0	0	0	0	—		—		0	0	0	0
Defensa y Justicia	Total		0	0	0	0	—		—		0	0	0	0
Berazategui (loan)	2016	Primera C Metropolitana	11	0	0	0	—		—		0	0	11	0
UAI Urquiza	2017–18	Primera B Metropolitana	8	0	0	0	—		—		5 (Note: Appearance(s) in the Primera B Metropolitana play-offs)	1	13	1
Ferro Carril Oeste	2018–19	Primera B Nacional	8	0	0	0	—		—		0	0	8	0
Los Andes	2019–20	Primera B Metropolitana	16	1	0	0	—		—		0	0	16	1
Colegiales	2020–21	Primera B Metropolitana	0	0	0	0	—		—		0	0	0	0
Career total			43	1	0	0	—		—		5	1	48	2
