= Lautaro Arellano =

Argentine footballer

Personal information
- Full name: Lautaro Arellano
- Date of birth: 17 April 1997 (age 29)
- Place of birth: Argentina
- Height: 1.73 m (5 ft 8 in)
- Position: Midfielder

Team information
- Current team: River Plate
- Number: 38

Youth career
- –2015: River Plate

Senior career*
Years	Team	Apps	(Gls)
2015–	River Plate	1	(0)
- * Club domestic league appearances and goals as of 2 December 2015 ‡ National team caps and goals as of 2 December 2015

Lautaro Arellano (born 17 April 1997) is an Argentine footballer who plays as a midfielder for River Plate.

== Club career ==
Arellano is a youth exponent from River Plate. He made his league debut on 8 November 2015 against Newell's Old Boys.
