= Federico Segovia =

Argentine footballer

Personal information
- Full name: Federico Lionel Segovia
- Date of birth: 21 July 1997 (age 29)
- Place of birth: Rosario, Argentina
- Height: 1.71 m (5 ft 7 1/2 in)
- Position: Midfielder

Team information
- Current team: Gimnasia y Tiro

Youth career
- Ferro Carril Oeste

Senior career*
| Years | Team | Apps | (Gls) |
| 2015–2021 | Ferro Carril Oeste | 8 | (0) |
| 2022– | Gimnasia y Tiro | 21 | (0) |
- * Club domestic league appearances and goals as of 19:20, 17 August 2022 (UTC)

Federico Lionel Segovia (born 21 July 1997) is an Argentine professional footballer who plays as a midfielder for Gimnasia y Tiro.

== Career ==
Segovia was first moved into the first-team of Primera B Nacional side Ferro Carril Oeste in May 2015, with the midfielder being an unused substitute for a Copa Argentina encounter at home to Boca Unidos. His professional bow didn't arrive until the 2018–19 season when he was picked off the bench during a fixture against Central Córdoba on 17 November 2018; another appearance came a week later versus Agropecuario.

== Career statistics ==
As of 5 January 2019.

Club statistics
| Club | Season | League | | | Cup | | Continental | | Other | | Total | |
| Club | Season | Division | Apps | Goals | Apps | Goals | Apps | Goals | Apps | Goals | Apps | Goals |
|---|---|---|---|---|---|---|---|---|---|---|---|---|
| Ferro Carril Oeste | 2015 | Primera B Nacional | 0 | 0 | 0 | 0 | — | | 0 | 0 | 0 | 0 |
| Ferro Carril Oeste | 2016 | Primera B Nacional | 0 | 0 | 0 | 0 | — | | 0 | 0 | 0 | 0 |
| Ferro Carril Oeste | 2016–17 | Primera B Nacional | 0 | 0 | 0 | 0 | — | | 0 | 0 | 0 | 0 |
| Ferro Carril Oeste | 2017–18 | Primera B Nacional | 0 | 0 | 0 | 0 | — | | 0 | 0 | 0 | 0 |
| Ferro Carril Oeste | 2018–19 | Primera B Nacional | 2 | 0 | 0 | 0 | — | | 0 | 0 | 2 | 0 |
| Career total | | | 2 | 0 | 0 | 0 | — | | 0 | 0 | 2 | 0 |
