= Rodrigo Godoy (Argentine footballer) =

Argentine footballer

Personal information
- Full name: Rodrigo Pedro Godoy
- Date of birth: 29 October 1989 (age 37)
- Place of birth: San Fernando, Argentina
- Position: Midfielder

Team information
- Current team: Deportivo Merlo

Youth career
- Deportivo Riestra

Senior career*
Years	Team	Apps	(Gls)
2004–2005	Deportivo Riestra	1	(0)
2010–2012	Sportivo Barracas	52	(6)
2013–2014	Yupanqui	25	(4)
2014	Juventud Unida		
2015	General Lamadrid	17	(3)
2015	Estudiantes	3	(0)
2016–2018	Sportivo Italiano	36	(3)
2018–2021	Acassuso	7	(0)
2021–	Deportivo Merlo	17	(1)
- * Club domestic league appearances and goals as of 17:07, 4 September 2022 (UTC)

Rodrigo Pedro Godoy (born 29 October 1989) is an Argentine professional footballer who plays as a midfielder for Deportivo Merlo.

== Career ==
Godoy's first experience of first-team football came with Deportivo Riestra, making his bow in Primera D Metropolitana during the 2004–05 campaign. That was his sole senior appearance until 2010, when he played the first of fifty-two fixtures for fellow fifth tier team Sportivo Barracas; though his first match for the club came in Primera C Metropolitana, prior to their relegation in 2009–10. After leaving Sportivo Barracas, Godoy spent the 2013–14 season with Yupanqui. In 2015, following a six-month stint with Juventud Unida, Godoy joined General Lamadrid. He scored four goals in nineteen total games, before departing to sign for Estudiantes.

In 2016, after appearances for Estudiantes versus Platense, Fénix and Comunicaciones in Primera B Metropolitana, Godoy completed a move to fourth tier team Sportivo Italiano. He remained for two years, participating in thirty-six fixtures and netting three goals. On 3 August 2018, Godoy returned to the third tier after being signed by Acassuso. His debut didn't arrive until 18 March 2019, as he came off the bench in an away defeat to UAI Urquiza.

== Career statistics ==
As of 5 April 2019.

Appearances and goals by club, season and competition
Club	Season	League			Cup		Continental		Other		Total	
Club	Season	Division	Apps	Goals	Apps	Goals	Apps	Goals	Apps	Goals	Apps	Goals
Deportivo Riestra	2004–05	Primera D Metropolitana	1	0	0	0	—		0	0	1	0
Sportivo Barracas	2009–10	Primera C Metropolitana	1	0	0	0	—		0	0	1	0
Yupanqui	2013–14	Primera D Metropolitana	25	4	0	0	—		0	0	25	4
General Lamadrid	2015	Primera C Metropolitana	17	3	2	1	—		0	0	19	4
Estudiantes	2015	Primera B Metropolitana	3	0	0	0	—		0	0	3	0
Acassuso	2018–19	Primera B Metropolitana	2	0	0	0	—		0	0	2	0
Career total			49	7	2	1	—		0	0	51	8
