= Tomás Asprea =

Argentine footballer

Personal information
- Date of birth: 28 February 1995 (age 31)
- Place of birth: Lanús, Argentina
- Height: 1.80 m (5 ft 11 in)
- Position: Right midfielder

Team information
- Current team: Santiago Morning
- Number: 6

Youth career
- Arsenal de Sarandí

Senior career*
| Years | Team | Apps | (Gls) |
| 2015 | Arsenal de Sarandí | 0 | (0) |
| 2016–2024 | Comunicaciones | 82 | (7) |
| 2018–2021 | → Ferro Carril Oeste (loan) | 58 | (2) |
| 2021 | → Belgrano (loan) | 23 | (0) |
| 2022 | → Ferro Carril Oeste (loan) | 7 | (0) |
| 2022 | → Gimnasia de Mendoza (loan) | 12 | (0) |
| 2024 | → Talleres RdE (loan) | 35 | (2) |
| 2025– | Santiago Morning | 6 | (0) |
- * Club domestic league appearances and goals as of 3 May 2025

Tomás Asprea (born 28 February 1995) is an Argentine professional footballer who plays as a right midfielder for Chilean club Santiago Morning.

== Career ==
Asprea started his career with Arsenal de Sarandí. In 2016, Asprea signed for Primera B Metropolitana side Comunicaciones. He made his professional bow during a goalless draw with Talleres on 21 February, which was his sole start in the 2016 campaign - though he did make five further appearances off the bench. His first goal arrived on 15 April 2017 versus Villa San Carlos. Midway through 2017–18, in January 2018, Asprea joined Primera B Nacional's Ferro Carril Oeste on loan for twelve months. He scored one goal in twenty-seven appearances during that spell, with his loan being extended by six months in December.

After thirty-one total games and one goal, versus Los Andes, for Ferro, Asprea returned to Comunicaciones on 30 June 2019. However, on 5 July, he returned to the Caballito outfit on fresh loan terms.

As a free agent, Asprea moved to Chile and signed with Santiago Morning for the 2025 season.

== Career statistics ==
As of 6 July 2019.

Club statistics
| Club | Season | League | | | Cup | | Continental | | Other | | Total | |
| Club | Season | Division | Apps | Goals | Apps | Goals | Apps | Goals | Apps | Goals | Apps | Goals |
|---|---|---|---|---|---|---|---|---|---|---|---|---|
| Arsenal de Sarandí | 2015 | Primera División | 0 | 0 | 0 | 0 | 0 | 0 | 0 | 0 | 0 | 0 |
| Comunicaciones | 2016 | Primera B Metropolitana | 6 | 0 | 0 | 0 | — | | 0 | 0 | 6 | 0 |
| Comunicaciones | 2016–17 | Primera B Metropolitana | 28 | 1 | 0 | 0 | — | | 5 (Note: Appearance(s) in the Primera B Metropolitana play-offs) | 0 | 33 | 1 |
| Comunicaciones | 2017–18 | Primera B Metropolitana | 16 | 1 | 0 | 0 | — | | 0 | 0 | 16 | 1 |
| Comunicaciones | 2018–19 | Primera B Metropolitana | 0 | 0 | 0 | 0 | — | | 0 | 0 | 0 | 0 |
| Comunicaciones | Total | | 50 | 2 | 0 | 0 | — | | 5 | 0 | 55 | 2 |
| Ferro Carril Oeste (loan) | 2017–18 | Primera B Nacional | 14 | 0 | 0 | 0 | — | | 0 | 0 | 14 | 0 |
| Ferro Carril Oeste (loan) | 2018–19 | Primera B Nacional | 17 | 1 | 0 | 0 | — | | 0 | 0 | 35 | 1 |
| Ferro Carril Oeste (loan) | Total | | 31 | 1 | 0 | 0 | — | | 0 | 0 | 31 | 1 |
| Career total | | | 81 | 3 | 0 | 0 | 0 | 0 | 5 | 0 | 86 | 3 |
