= Matías Mariatti =

Argentine footballer

Personal information
- Full name: Matías Mariatti
- Date of birth: 26 January 1997 (age 29)
- Place of birth: Argentina
- Height: 1.80 m (5 ft 11 in)
- Position: Defender

Team information
- Current team: Ferro Carril Oeste

Youth career
- 2013–2017: Ferro Carril Oeste

Senior career*
Years	Team	Apps	(Gls)
2017–	Ferro Carril Oeste	12	(0)
- * Club domestic league appearances and goals as of 22:32, 25 September 2019 (UTC)

Matías Mariatti (born 26 January 1997) is an Argentine professional footballer who plays as a defender for Ferro Carril Oeste.

== Career ==
Mariatti's career started with Ferro Carril Oeste, who he joined in 2013. After appearing on the club's bench for a 2016–17 Primera B Nacional fixture with Almagro in July 2017, Mariatti made his professional debut on 7 February 2018 during a 3–3 draw away to All Boys. Another appearance followed a month later against Los Andes, in a campaign which Ferro finished in eighteenth place.

== Career statistics ==
As of 30 December 2018.

Club statistics
Club	Season	League			Cup		Continental		Other		Total	
Club	Season	Division	Apps	Goals	Apps	Goals	Apps	Goals	Apps	Goals	Apps	Goals
Ferro Carril Oeste	2016–17	Primera B Nacional	0	0	0	0	—		0	0	0	0
Ferro Carril Oeste	2017–18	Primera B Nacional	2	0	0	0	—		0	0	2	0
Ferro Carril Oeste	2018–19	Primera B Nacional	2	0	0	0	—		0	0	2	0
Career total			4	0	0	0	—		0	0	4	0
