= Renzo Tesuri =

Argentine footballer

Personal information
- Full name: Renzo Iván Tesuri
- Date of birth: 7 June 1996 (age 30)
- Place of birth: Gualeguaychú, Argentina
- Height: 1.70 m (5 ft 7 in)
- Position: Right winger

Team information
- Current team: Atlético Tucumán
- Number: 11

Youth career
- Juventud Unida

Senior career*
Years	Team	Apps	(Gls)
2013–2017	Juventud Unida	39	(5)
2017–2018	Gimnasia y Esgrima	24	(0)
2018–2020	Ferro Carril Oeste	43	(8)
2020–2021	Godoy Cruz	18	(3)
2021–	Atlético Tucumán	165	(13)
- * Club domestic league appearances and goals as of 17:34, 9 November 2026 (UTC)

Renzo Iván Tesuri (born 7 June 1996) is an Argentine professional footballer who plays as a right winger for Atlético Tucumán.

== Career ==
Juventud Unida were Tesuri's first club. He made his professional debut at the age of seventeen, playing the last ten minutes of a Torneo Argentino A defeat to Central Norte on 24 November 2013. His next appearance arrived in June 2016 against Independiente Rivadavia in Primera B Nacional, after the club won promotion in 2014. He scored his first goal during a fixture with Los Andes on 13 November, which was the first of five in the 2016–17 season; two coming in a win over Douglas Haig on 19 March 2017. Five months later, in August, Tesuri joined fellow second tier team Gimnasia y Esgrima. He featured twenty-four times.

On 19 June 2018, Tesuri was signed by Ferro Carril Oeste. He netted his opening goal in his second appearance versus Guillermo Brown on 1 September.

== Career statistics ==
As of 6 January 2019.

Club statistics
Club	Season	League			Cup		Continental		Other		Total	
Club	Season	Division	Apps	Goals	Apps	Goals	Apps	Goals	Apps	Goals	Apps	Goals
Juventud Unida	2013–14	Torneo Argentino A	1	0	0	0	—		0	0	1	0
Juventud Unida	2014	Torneo Federal A	0	0	1	0	—		0	0	1	0
Juventud Unida	2015	Primera B Nacional	0	0	0	0	—		0	0	0	0
Juventud Unida	2016	Primera B Nacional	1	0	0	0	—		0	0	1	0
Juventud Unida	2016–17	Primera B Nacional	37	5	3	0	—		0	0	40	5
Juventud Unida	Total		39	5	4	0	—		0	0	43	5
Gimnasia y Esgrima	2017–18	Primera B Nacional	24	0	0	0	—		0	0	24	0
Ferro Carril Oeste	2018–19	Primera B Nacional	13	1	0	0	—		0	0	13	1
Career total			76	6	4	0	—		0	0	80	6
