= Gustavo Canto =

Argentine footballer

Personal information
- Full name: Gustavo Damián Canto
- Date of birth: 25 February 1994 (age 32)
- Place of birth: Saldán, Argentina
- Height: 1.84 m (6 ft 0 in)
- Position: Centre-back

Team information
- Current team: Ferro Carril Oeste

Senior career*
Years	Team	Apps	(Gls)
2012–2013	Racing de Córdoba	4	(0)
2014–2015	Tiro Federal	6	(0)
2015–2016	Sarmiento	3	(0)
2016–2018	Ferro Carril Oeste	49	(2)
2018–2019	Tijuana	11	(0)
2019	→ Dorados (loan)	7	(0)
2019–2020	Ferro Carril Oeste	17	(2)
2020–2021	Patronato	17	(1)
2021–2022	Banfield	13	(0)
2022	→ Emelec (loan)	5	(0)
2022–2023	Arsenal de Sarandí	14	(0)
2023–2024	Central Córdoba SdE	38	(0)
2024–2025	Gimnasia LP	11	(0)
2025–2026	Always Ready	8	(0)
2026–	Ferro Carril Oeste	4	(0)
- * Club domestic league appearances and goals as of 17:03, 11 April 2026 (UTC)

Gustavo Damián Canto (born 25 February 1994) is an Argentine footballer who plays as a centre-back for Ferro Carril Oeste.
