= Pablo Ortega (footballer) =

Argentine footballer

Personal information
- Full name: Pablo Oscar Ortega Vargas
- Date of birth: 29 August 1994 (age 32)
- Place of birth: Villa Dolores, Argentina
- Height: 1.68 m (5 ft 6 in)
- Position: Midfielder

Team information
- Current team: Olimpo

Youth career
- Villa Dolores
- Atalaya
- 2009–2014: Talleres

Senior career*
| Years | Team | Apps | (Gls) |
| 2014–2017 | Talleres | 13 | (1) |
| 2016 | → Tlaxcala (loan) | 12 | (4) |
| 2017–2019 | Central Córdoba | 47 | (10) |
| 2019–2021 | Ferro Carril Oeste | 7 | (0) |
| 2021 | Güemes | 3 | (0) |
| 2022– | Olimpo | 6 | (1) |
- * Club domestic league appearances and goals as of 19:13, 7 August 2022 (UTC)

Pablo Oscar Ortega Vargas (born 29 August 1994) is an Argentine professional footballer who plays as a midfielder for Club Olimpo.

== Career ==
Ortega played for local club Villa Dolores at youth level, as well as Atalaya. Talleres signed the midfielder in 2009. Five years later, Ortega made his debut in the Copa Argentina against Alumni; having previously appeared as an unused substitute in the same competition versus Newell's Old Boys three months prior. His first appearance in league football arrived in Torneo Federal A on 7 December 2014 during a match with Gimnasia y Esgrima, prior to his first goal versus Defensores de Belgrano in the following June. In January 2016, Ortega joined Liga Premier de México side Tlaxcala on loan. Four goals in twelve games followed.

He returned to Argentina and Talleres in June 2016, subsequently departing a year later to sign for Torneo Federal A's Central Córdoba. He netted goals over Defensores de Belgrano (2), Libertad, Crucero del Norte, Estudiantes and Juventud Unida Universitario as the club won promotion to Primera B Nacional in his first season. His professional debut came on 26 August 2018 during a draw with Deportivo Morón.

== Career statistics ==
As of 6 December 2018.

Club statistics
| Club | Season | League | | | Cup (Note: Includes the Copa Argentina and Copa MX) | | League Cup | | Continental | | Other | | Total | |
| Club | Season | Division | Apps | Goals | Apps | Goals | Apps | Goals | Apps | Goals | Apps | Goals | Apps | Goals |
|---|---|---|---|---|---|---|---|---|---|---|---|---|---|---|
| Talleres | 2014 | Torneo Federal A | 0 | 0 | 1 | 0 | — | | — | | 1 (Note: One appearance in the 2014 Torneo Federal A play-offs) | 0 | 2 | 0 |
| Talleres | 2015 | Torneo Federal A | 13 | 1 | 0 | 0 | — | | — | | 0 | 0 | 13 | 1 |
| Talleres | 2016 | Primera B Nacional | 0 | 0 | 0 | 0 | — | | — | | 0 | 0 | 0 | 0 |
| Talleres | 2016–17 | Primera División | 0 | 0 | 0 | 0 | — | | — | | 0 | 0 | 0 | 0 |
| Talleres | Total | | 13 | 1 | 1 | 0 | — | | — | | 1 | 0 | 15 | 1 |
| Tlaxcala (loan) | 2015–16 | Liga Premier | 12 | 4 | 0 | 0 | — | | — | | 2 (Note: Two appearances in the 2015–16 Liga Premier de México play-offs) | 0 | 14 | 4 |
| Central Córdoba | 2017–18 | Torneo Federal A | 26 | 6 | 3 | 1 | — | | — | | 0 | 0 | 29 | 7 |
| Central Córdoba | 2018–19 | Primera B Nacional | 6 | 0 | 4 | 1 | — | | — | | 0 | 0 | 10 | 1 |
| Central Córdoba | Total | | 32 | 6 | 7 | 2 | — | | — | | 0 | 0 | 39 | 8 |
| Career total | | | 57 | 11 | 7 | 2 | — | | — | | 3 | 0 | 67 | 13 |

== Honours ==
Talleres

- Torneo Federal A: 2015

Central Córdoba

- Torneo Federal A: 2017–18
