= Rodrigo Melo (footballer, born 1995) =

Argentine footballer

Personal information
- Full name: Rodrigo Iñaki Melo
- Date of birth: 24 September 1995 (age 31)
- Place of birth: Argentina
- Height: 1.85 m (6 ft 1 in)
- Position: Midfielder

Team information
- Current team: Estudiantes BA

Youth career
- Comunicaciones

Senior career*
Years	Team	Apps	(Gls)
2014–2021	Comunicaciones	76	(0)
2018–2019	→ Ferro Carril Oeste (loan)	12	(0)
2019–2021	→ Estudiantes BA (loan)	40	(2)
2022–2025	Deportivo Cuenca	69	(1)
2024–2025	→ Atlético Tucumán (loan)	21	(0)
2025–	Estudiantes BA	19	(0)
- * Club domestic league appearances and goals as of 16:08, 28 April 2026 (UTC)

Rodrigo Iñaki Melo (born 24 September 1995) is an Argentine professional footballer who plays as a midfielder for Estudiantes BA.

== Career ==
Melo started with Comunicaciones in Primera B Metropolitana. In his opening two campaigns, 2015 and 2016, Melo featured five times in each, three of which on both occasions being starts; though he played for eighteen more minutes in 2016. Having made seventy-one appearances in the following two seasons, Melo left the club in June 2018 to join Primera B Nacional side Ferro Carril Oeste on loan. He made his debut on 25 August during a defeat away to Nueva Chicago.

== Career statistics ==
As of 4 January 2019.

Club statistics
Club	Season	League			Cup		Continental		Other		Total	
Club	Season	Division	Apps	Goals	Apps	Goals	Apps	Goals	Apps	Goals	Apps	Goals
Comunicaciones	2015	Primera B Metropolitana	5	0	1	0	—		0	0	6	0
Comunicaciones	2016	Primera B Metropolitana	5	0	0	0	—		0	0	5	0
Comunicaciones	2016–17	Primera B Metropolitana	34	0	0	0	—		5 (Note: Appearance(s) in the Primera B Metropolitana play-offs)	0	39	0
Comunicaciones	2017–18	Primera B Metropolitana	32	0	0	0	—		0	0	32	0
Comunicaciones	2018–19	Primera B Metropolitana	0	0	0	0	—		0	0	0	0
Comunicaciones	Total		76	0	1	0	—		5	0	82	0
Ferro Carril Oeste (loan)	2018–19	Primera B Nacional	11	0	0	0	—		0	0	11	0
Career total			87	0	1	0	—		5	0	93	0
