= Fernando Miranda (footballer) =

Argentine footballer

Personal information
- Full name: Fernando Miranda
- Date of birth: 14 October 1997 (age 29)
- Place of birth: Argentina
- Height: 1.73 m (5 ft 8 in)
- Position: Midfielder

Team information
- Current team: Agropecuario

Youth career
- 2008–2018: Ferro Carril Oeste

Senior career*
Years	Team	Apps	(Gls)
2018–2023	Ferro Carril Oeste	65	(0)
2022	→ Estudiantes de Caseros (loan)	27	(0)
2023	→ Deportes La Serena (loan)	29	(0)
2024	Estudiantes de Caseros	22	(0)
2025–	Agropecuario	14	(0)
- * Club domestic league appearances and goals as of 16:47, 28 June 2025 (UTC)

Fernando Miranda (born 14 October 1997) is an Argentine professional footballer who plays as a midfielder for Agropecuario.

== Career ==
Miranda started his career with Ferro Carril Oeste, signing for their youth system in 2008. Alejandro Orfila promoted the midfielder into his senior squad during the 2018–19 Primera B Nacional campaign, selecting Miranda for his professional debut on 24 September 2018 during a defeat to Atlético de Rafaela. He featured in three further fixtures in 2018, which included his first start against Los Andes on 30 September. In January 2022, Miranda moved to Estudiantes de Caseros on a one-year loan deal. The net year, he moved to Chile and joined on loan to Deportes La Serena in the Primera B.

In 2024, he ended his contract with Ferro Carril Oeste and rejoined Estudiantes de Caseros.

== Career statistics ==
As of 4 January 2019.

Club statistics
Club	Season	League			Cup		Continental		Other		Total	
Club	Season	Division	Apps	Goals	Apps	Goals	Apps	Goals	Apps	Goals	Apps	Goals
Ferro Carril Oeste	2018–19	Primera B Nacional	4	0	0	0	—		0	0	4	0
Career total			4	0	0	0	—		0	0	4	0
