= Enzo Díaz (footballer, born 1992) =

Argentine footballer

Personal information
- Full name: Enzo Roberto Díaz
- Date of birth: 14 January 1992 (age 34)
- Place of birth: Lobería, Argentina
- Height: 1.79 m (5 ft 10 1/2 in)
- Position: Forward

Team information
- Current team: UAI Urquiza

Youth career
- Vélez Sarsfield
- Santamarina

Senior career*
Years	Team	Apps	(Gls)
	Jorge Newbery	–	(–)
2016–2018	UAI Urquiza	60	(20)
2018–2019	Ferro Carril Oeste	23	(14)
2019–2023	Tigre	37	(2)
2022	→ Ferro Carril Oeste (loan)	29	(13)
2023	→ Patronato (loan)	26	(3)
2024	Deportes Antofagasta	18	(4)
2025	Los Andes	24	(2)
2026–	UAI Urquiza	4	(1)
- * Club domestic league appearances and goals as of 19:53, 19 March 2026 (UTC)

Enzo Roberto Díaz (born 14 January 1992) is an Argentine professional footballer who plays as a forward for Primera B Metropolitana club UAI Urquiza.

== Career ==
Díaz started his career in the youth system of Vélez Sarsfield, prior to having a stint with Santamarina. Díaz began his senior career with Jorge Newbery de Lobería in Liga Necochense, before signing for Primera B Metropolitana's UAI Urquiza on 11 August 2016. He scored on his professional debut on 26 August against San Telmo, which was followed by another goal in his next appearance versus Almirante Brown. Díaz finished the 2016–17 campaign with eight goals. He netted fifteen times in his second season, with the goals being spread across fourteen fixtures; his only brace came in May 2018 against Estudiantes.

On 30 June 2018, Díaz completed a move to Ferro Carril Oeste of Primera B Nacional. Six goals followed across his opening twelve appearances, with the forward concluding the campaign with fourteen goals.

In 2024, he moved to Chile and signed with Deportes Antofagasta.

== Career statistics ==
As of 24 May 2019.

Club statistics
Club	Season	League			Cup		League Cup		Continental		Other		Total	
Club	Season	Division	Apps	Goals	Apps	Goals	Apps	Goals	Apps	Goals	Apps	Goals	Apps	Goals
UAI Urquiza	2016–17	Primera B Metropolitana	31	8	0	0	—		—		0	0	31	8
UAI Urquiza	2017–18	Primera B Metropolitana	29	12	0	0	—		—		5 (Note: Appearance(s) in the Primera B Metropolitana play-offs)	3	34	15
UAI Urquiza	Total		60	20	0	0	—		—		5	3	65	23
Ferro Carril Oeste	2018–19	Primera B Nacional	23	14	0	0	—		—		0	0	23	14
Career total			83	34	0	0	—		—		5	3	88	37
