= Sebastián Olivarez =

Argentine footballer

Personal information
- Full name: Leandro Sebastián Olivarez
- Date of birth: 15 May 1992 (age 34)
- Place of birth: Mendoza, Argentina
- Height: 1.80 m (5 ft 11 in)
- Position: Defender

Team information
- Current team: Ferro Carril Oeste (on loan from Godoy Cruz)

Senior career*
Years	Team	Apps	(Gls)
2011–	Godoy Cruz	41	(1)
2018	→ Belgrano (loan)	11	(0)
2019–	→ Ferro Carril Oeste (loan)	0	(0)
- * Club domestic league appearances and goals as of 01:57, 3 January 2019 (UTC)

Leandro Sebastián Olivarez (born 15 May 1992) is an Argentine professional footballer who plays as a defender for Ferro Carril Oeste, on loan from Godoy Cruz.

== Career ==
Olivarez began his Godoy Cruz career in 2011, appearing on the substitutes bench in a Copa Argentina tie with Sportivo Italiano on 24 November. He made his professional debut during the 2011–12 Argentine Primera División season, playing the full ninety minutes in a goalless draw against Independiente on 22 April 2012. Forty Primera División appearances later, Olivarez scored his first senior goal in the club's 2017–18 league opener versus Atlético Tucumán on 27 August 2017. 2018 saw Olivarez leave Godoy Cruz on loan to join Belgrano, which preceded a further loan move to Ferro Carril Oeste in January 2019.

== Career statistics ==
As of 3 January 2019.

Club statistics
Club	Season	League			Cup (Note: Includes the Copa Argentina)		League Cup		Continental (Note: Includes the Copa Libertadores and Copa Sudamericana)		Other		Total	
Club	Season	Division	Apps	Goals	Apps	Goals	Apps	Goals	Apps	Goals	Apps	Goals	Apps	Goals
Godoy Cruz	2011–12	Primera División	1	0	0	0	—		0	0	0	0	1	0
Godoy Cruz	2012–13	Primera División	3	0	0	0	—		—		0	0	3	0
Godoy Cruz	2013–14	Primera División	5	0	0	0	—		—		0	0	5	0
Godoy Cruz	2014	Primera División	7	0	0	0	—		0	0	0	0	7	0
Godoy Cruz	2015	Primera División	10	0	1	0	—		—		0	0	11	0
Godoy Cruz	2016	Primera División	2	0	0	0	—		—		0	0	2	0
Godoy Cruz	2016–17	Primera División	12	0	1	0	—		3 (Note: Three appearances in 2017 Copa Libertadores)	0	0	0	16	0
Godoy Cruz	2017–18	Primera División	1	1	1	0	—		2 (Note: Two appearances in 2017 Copa Libertadores)	0	0	0	4	1
Godoy Cruz	2018–19	Primera División	0	0	0	0	—		0	0	0	0	0	0
Godoy Cruz	Total		41	1	3	0	—		5	0	0	0	49	1
Belgrano (loan)	2018–19	Primera División	11	0	0	0	—		—		0	0	11	0
Career total			52	1	3	0	—		5	0	0	0	60	1
