= Lautaro Torres =

Argentine footballer

Personal information
- Full name: Lautaro Gabriel Torres
- Date of birth: 28 September 1996 (age 30)
- Place of birth: Béccar, Argentina
- Height: 1.78 m (5 ft 10 in)
- Position: Midfielder

Team information
- Current team: Sacachispas

Youth career
- Ferro Carril Oeste

Senior career*
Years	Team	Apps	(Gls)
2016–2023	Ferro Carril Oeste	96	(4)
2020–2021	→ Patronato (loan)	20	(2)
2021	→ Central Córdoba SdE (loan)	4	(0)
2023–2024	Quilmes	10	(0)
2024–2025	Los Andes	2	(0)
2025	Colegiales	6	(0)
2025–	Sacachispas	4	(0)
- * Club domestic league appearances and goals as of 19:12, 17 July 2022 (UTC)

Lautaro Gabriel Torres (born 28 September 1996) is an Argentine professional footballer who plays as Sacachispas a midfielder for .

== Career ==
Torres began his career with Ferro Carril Oeste. He featured in his first match on 12 June 2016 against Almagro in Primera B Nacional, which was one of two in 2016; the other coming in a fixture with Gimnasia y Esgrima a week later. An overall of fifty-eight appearances followed in the next two seasons, with Torres scoring three goals; two of which arriving in separate games with All Boys.

== Career statistics ==
As of 5 January 2019.

Club statistics
Club	Season	League			Cup		Continental		Other		Total	
Club	Season	Division	Apps	Goals	Apps	Goals	Apps	Goals	Apps	Goals	Apps	Goals
Ferro Carril Oeste	2016	Primera B Nacional	2	0	0	0	—		0	0	2	0
Ferro Carril Oeste	2016–17	Primera B Nacional	34	1	1	0	—		0	0	35	1
Ferro Carril Oeste	2017–18	Primera B Nacional	23	2	0	0	—		0	0	23	2
Ferro Carril Oeste	2018–19	Primera B Nacional	12	3	0	0	—		0	0	12	3
Career total			71	6	1	0	—		0	0	72	6
