= Club Atlético Acassuso =

Argentine sports club

Acassuso
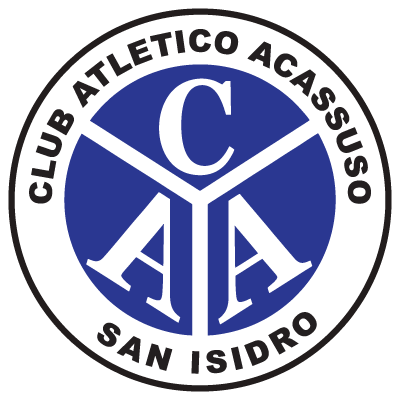
- Full name: Club Atlético Acassuso
- Nicknames: Los Quemeros; Ssuso
- Founded: 7 September 1922; 104 years ago
- Ground: Estadio La Quema, Boulogne Sur Mer
- Capacity: 1500
- Chairman: Alberto Trípoli
- Manager: Darío Lema
- League: Primera B
- 2024: 16th
- Website: clubacassuso.com.ar
Home colours	Away colours	Third colours

Club Atlético Acassuso is an Argentine sports club headquartered in San Isidro, Buenos Aires. The club is mostly known for its football team, which currently plays in Primera B, the regionalised third division of the Argentine football league system.

Acassuso has its own stadium in the Boulogne Sur Mer district, in which the club, as of 2025, started playing its home games again.

== History ==
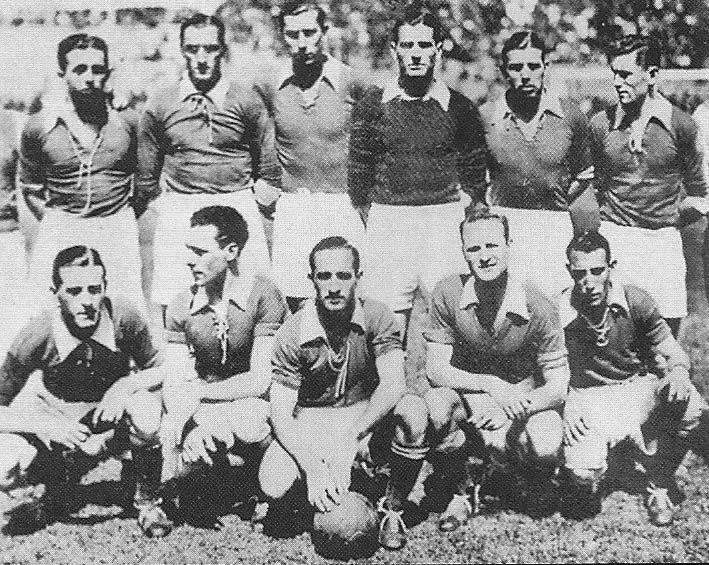
In 1937 Acassuso won its third title, the Primera Amateur championship

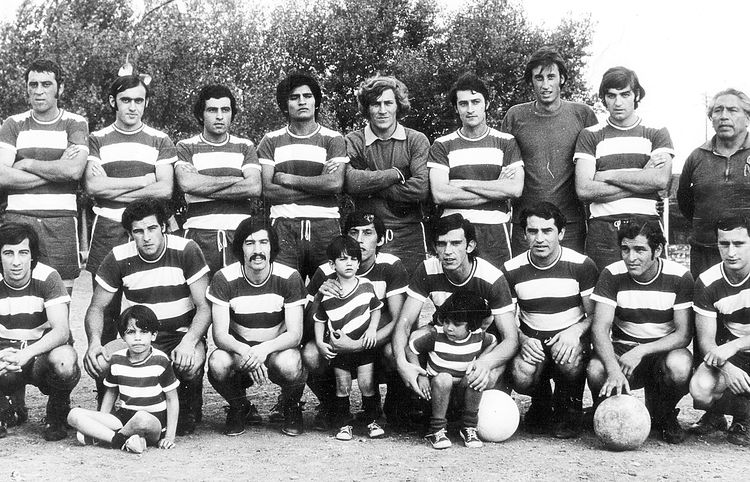
The team that won the 1971 Primera D title

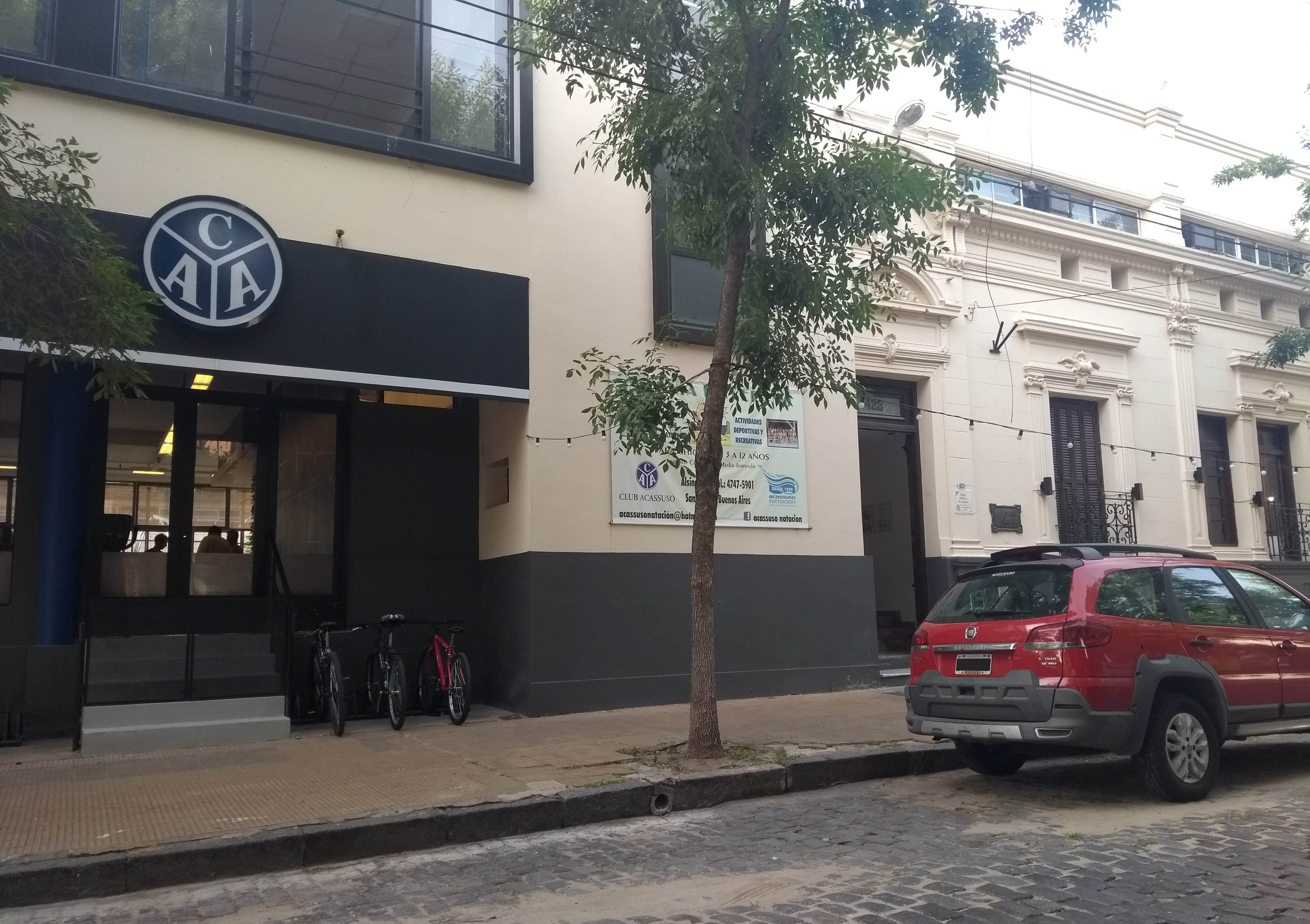
Club headquarters in San Isidro

The club was established as "Villa Acassuso Football Club" on 7 September 1922, by a group of football enthusiasts from Villa Acassuso in San Isidro Partido. At the end of 1923 the team began to participate in the third division of Asociación Amateurs de Football (a dissident league formed in 1919), winning the title and promoting to the upper division that same year.

In 1923 the club also built its first field because of a donation by Don Ernesto de las Carreras. The field was located on Márquez Avenue and Haedo in San Isidro and was inaugurated on November 4. Two years later the club changed its name to "Club Atlético Acassuso". The name also honored Domingo de Acassuso, founder of San Isidro partido.

Acassuso obtained a place in the official Argentine Football Association league because many of the major clubs had left to form a breakaway professional league, Liga Argentina de Football. Therefore, Acassuso played in the first division, although the squad finished in the last positions before the league was disbanded in 1934. That participation was its only spell in the top division.

Playing at the third division, Acassuso won another title in 1937, therefore promoting to Primera B Metropolitana. In 1946 the team was near to promote to the top level, Primera División, but lost to Argentinos Juniors which finally achieved promotion to the first division.

In 1946 the team was relegated and its field was expropriated by the Municipality. Soon after the club got a land on De las Carreras Avenue and Camino de la Legua and established there. Nevertheless, that new land would be also expropriated. In 1977 the Municipality of San Isidro gave the club a land on Santa Rita street to build a new stadium. It was opened in 1983 under the name "Estadio La Quema".

In 2007 the club was promoted to Primera B after winning both the Apertura 2006 and Clausura 2007 of Primera C.

Acassuso had a great 2017-18 season, finishing 3rd in the table and qualifying to the playoffs, where they were eliminated in the quarter-finals. The following season was also a good season for the club, finishing 5th in the table and qualifying to the playoffs again, but being eliminated at the first hurdle again, this time by All Boys 3-2 on aggregate.

== Players ==
=== Current squad ===
As of 13 October 2019

Note: Flags indicate national team as defined under FIFA eligibility rules; some limited exceptions apply. Players may hold more than one non-FIFA nationality.

No.	Pos.	Nation	Player
1	GK	ARG	Lucas Álvarez
2	DF	ARG	Andrés Zanini
3	DF	ARG	Marcelo Tinari
4	DF	ARG	Federico Real
5	MF	ARG	Nicolás Magno
6	DF	ARG	Lucas Medina
7	MF	ARG	Julián Bartolo
8	MF	ARG	Agustín Benítez
9	FW	ARG	Franco Caballero
10	MF	ARG	Enzo Ritacco
11	MF	ARG	Franco Torres
12	MF	ARG	Lauro Gamba
13	DF	COL	Alejandro Gutiérrez
14	MF	ARG	Lorenzo Monti

No.	Pos.	Nation	Player
15	MF	ARG	Rodrigo Godoy
16	MF	ARG	Matías Rojas
17	FW	ARG	Rafael Monti
18	MF	ARG	Emanuel Pentimalli (on loan from Defensores Unidos)
19	FW	ARG	Rodrigo Castillo
20	FW	ARG	Federico Sellecchia
21	MF	ARG	Diego Amarilla
22	FW	ARG	Agustín Auzmendi
23	FW	ARG	Emanuel Grespán (on loan from Ferro Carril Oeste)
24	FW	ARG	Damián Salvatierra
29	GK	ARG	Augusto Vantomme
32	MF	ARG	Christian Moreno
36	DF	CHN	Zhong Yi Qiu

== Honours ==
- División Intermedia (1): 1928
- Segunda División (1): 1923 AAm (Note: The Asociación Amateurs de Football (AAm) was a dissident association that organized its own tournaments from 1919 to 1926.)
- Primera C (2): 1937, 2006–07
- Primera D (2): 1971, 2000–01
