= 2019–20 Quilmes Atlético Club season =

Association football season

Quilmes
2019–20 season
- President: Marcelo Calello (until 26 August 2019); Christian Sterli (from 26 August 2019)
- Manager: Leonardo Lemos
- Stadium: Estadio Centenario Ciudad de Quilmes
- Top goalscorer: League: David Drocco (1); Federico Álvarez; Martín Prost; All: David Drocco (1); Federico Álvarez; Martín Prost

The 2019–20 season is Quilmes' 3rd consecutive season in the second division of Argentine football, Primera B Nacional.

The season generally covers the period from 1 July 2019 to 30 June 2020.

== Review ==
=== Pre-season ===
Quilmes' first exit of 2019–20 was agreed back in May 2019, as Augusto Max switched Argentina for Greece by joining Volos. On 14 June, Leandro González arrived from Temperley to become Quilmes' first reinforcement. Alejandro Altuna (San Martín (T) followed in on 18 June. Quilmes played their first pre-season friendlies on 21 June versus Futbolistas Argentinos Agremiados, initially beating the team of free agents 3–0 before drawing 1–1. 26 June saw Franco Niell depart to Barracas Central, two days prior to Quilmes' second set of exhibitions against Puerto Nuevo of Primera D Metropolitana; they won by an aggregate of 6–0. 2018–19 loans ended on 30 June. July opened with them meeting Uruguay's Fénix; sharing wins. Martín Prost signed from Sport Boys on 4 July.

An incoming and an outgoing were made official on 5 July, as Gabriel Ramírez joined from Lanús while Juan Larrea headed to Greece with second tier club Apollon Smyrnis. Argentino were dispatched across two friendlies on 6 July, with José Luis Valdez netting a hat-trick in a 5–1 victory; the day's latter fixture. Three days later, Abel Masuero penned terms from Atlético de Rafaela. Quilmes failed to beat upcoming divisional rivals Agropecuario in matches on 12 July, as a goalless draw was followed by a loss. Also on that date, former Belgrano player Federico Álvarez came to the club. San Martín (T) publicised the arrival of Mauro Bellone on 13 July. Preparations continued on 17 July as they avoided defeat in two games with Brown at the Estadio Centenario Ciudad de Quilmes.

Goalkeeper Alejandro Medina was announced as Quilmes' seventh signing on 17 July. Alan Ferreyra was loaned to Colegiales forty-eight hours later. Two sets of friendlies occurred between 20/24 July versus Aldosivi and Talleres, with the games ending in similar fashion after goalless draws were followed by two-goal Quilmes wins. On the same day as the latter, Emanuel Bilbao joined from Alvarado. An encounter with Almagro, scheduled for 27 July, was postponed, though the two did eventually meet on 30 July - with both match-ups concluding scoreless. Quilmes' next non-competitive opponents were San Telmo, who they defeated on 3 August; Tomás Blanco secured a one-nil, prior to Justo Giani, Camilo Machado, Tomás Verón Lupi and José Luis Valdez scoring in a 4–0 result.

Quilmes netted four times again in their penultimate friendlies over Villa San Carlos on 7 August, as a 4–2 came after a 0–0. Their final opposition in pre-season was set to be Chacarita Juniors, though an encounter with them was cancelled late on. On the eve of their Primera B Nacional bow for 2019–20, Quilmes revealed a double incoming of Carlos Matheu (Unión Española) and Bautista Cejas (Estudiantes (LP).

=== August ===
A trip to recent Primera División team and Copa de la Superliga holders Tigre opened Quilmes' campaign in Primera B Nacional on 18 August, with El Cervecero taking the points after goals from David Drocco and Federico Álvarez. Christian Sterli became Quilmes' new president on 25 August, replacing Marcelo Calello. Quilmes won their second match in the league on 26 August, defeating Defensores de Belgrano 1–0 at the Estadio Centenario Ciudad de Quilmes.

=== September ===
Quilmes dropped their first points of 2019–20 on 2 September against Gimnasia y Esgrima (M), though maintained their unbeaten streak after drawing 0–0 in Mendoza.

== Squad ==
Squad No.	Nationality	Name	Position(s)	Date of birth (age)	Signed from
Goalkeepers
	Argentina	Esteban Glellel	GK	8 January 1999 (age 27)	Academy
	Argentina	Marcos Ledesma	GK	15 September 1996 (age 30)	Academy
	Argentina	Alejandro Medina	GK	14 February 1987 (age 39)	Boca Unidos
Defenders
	Argentina	Alan Alegre	CB	3 February 1991 (age 35)	Aldosivi
	Argentina	Federico Álvarez	LB	7 August 1994 (age 32)	Belgrano
	Argentina	Elías Barraza	DF	24 February 1998 (age 28)	Academy
	Argentina	Tomás López	DF	27 June 1997 (age 29)	Academy
	Argentina	Raúl Lozano	RB	2 September 1997 (age 29)	Academy
	Argentina	Abel Masuero	CB	6 April 1988 (age 38)	Atlético de Rafaela
	Argentina	Carlos Matheu	CB	13 May 1985 (age 41)	Unión Española
	Argentina	Martín Ortega	DF	20 August 1999 (age 27)	Academy
	Argentina	Sebastián Uzzante	DF	24 April 2000 (age 26)	Academy
Midfielders
	Argentina	Enzo Acosta	CM	30 November 1996 (age 29)	Academy
	Argentina	Juan Altamiranda	DM	3 August 1997 (age 29)	Academy
	Argentina	Alejandro Altuna	DM	19 January 1992 (age 34)	San Martín (T)
	Argentina	Tomás Blanco	MF	17 March 1999 (age 27)	Academy
	Argentina	Bautista Cejas	LW	6 March 1998 (age 28)	Estudiantes (LP)
	Argentina	David Drocco	DM	20 January 1989 (age 37)	Huracán
	Colombia	Camilo Machado	AM	1 February 1999 (age 27)	Academy
	Argentina	Matías Noble	LM	9 August 1996 (age 30)	Gimnasia y Esgrima (LP)
	Argentina	Brandon Obregón	AM	23 May 1996 (age 30)	Academy
	Argentina	Gastón Pinedo	MF	18 February 1998 (age 28)	Academy
	Argentina	Gabriel Ramírez	CM	29 June 1995 (age 31)	Lanús
	Argentina	Cristian Zabala	MF	4 March 1998 (age 28)	Academy
Forwards
	Argentina	Facundo Bruera	FW	23 September 1998 (age 28)	Estudiantes (LP)
	Argentina	Matías Fernández	FW	23 June 2001 (age 25)	Academy
	Argentina	Justo Giani	FW	7 April 1999 (age 27)	Academy
	Argentina	Leandro González	CF	14 October 1985 (age 41)	Temperley
	Argentina	Juan Imbert	CF	31 March 1990 (age 36)	Chacarita Juniors
	Argentina	Martín Prost	CF	8 December 1989 (age 36)	Sport Boys
	Argentina	José Luis Valdez	FW	14 April 1998 (age 28)	Academy
	Argentina	Tomás Verón Lupi	FW	3 September 2000 (age 26)	Academy
Out on loan					Loaned to
	Argentina	Alan Ferreyra	GK	18 April 1996 (age 30)	Colegiales

== Transfers ==
Domestic transfer windows:
3 July 2019 to 24 September 2019
20 January 2020 to 19 February 2020.

=== Transfers in ===
Date from	Position	Nationality	Name	From	Ref.
3 July 2019 (Note: Deal agreed on 14 June 2019)	CF	Argentina	Leandro González	Temperley	
3 July 2019 (Note: Deal agreed on 18 June 2019)	DM	Argentina	Alejandro Altuna	San Martín (T)	
4 July 2019	CF	Argentina	Martín Prost	Sport Boys	
5 July 2019	CM	Argentina	Gabriel Ramírez	Lanús	
9 July 2019	CB	Argentina	Abel Masuero	Atlético de Rafaela	
12 July 2019	LB	Argentina	Federico Álvarez	Belgrano	
17 July 2019	GK	Argentina	Alejandro Medina	Boca Unidos	
17 August 2019	CB	Argentina	Carlos Matheu	Unión Española	
17 August 2019	LW	Argentina	Bautista Cejas	Estudiantes (LP)	

=== Transfers out ===
Date from	Position	Nationality	Name	To	Ref.
1 July 2019 (Note: Deal agreed on 9 May 2019)	RM	Argentina	Augusto Max	Volos	
3 July 2019 (Note: Deal agreed on 26 June 2019)	RW	Argentina	Franco Niell	Barracas Central	
5 July 2019	DM	Argentina	Juan Larrea	Apollon Smyrnis	
13 July 2019	CM	Argentina	Mauro Bellone	San Martín (T)	
24 July 2019	GK	Argentina	Emanuel Bilbao	Alvarado	

=== Loans out ===
Start date	Position	Nationality	Name	To	End date	Ref.
19 July 2019	GK	Argentina	Alan Ferreyra	Colegiales	30 June 2020	

== Friendlies ==
=== Pre-season ===
Quilmes scheduled friendlies with twelve opponents, kicking off with an encounter against Futbolistas Argentinos Agremiados, a team of free agents, in June before concluding with an exhibition match with Chacarita Juniors in August.

Win Draw Loss

21 June 2019 Friendly	Quilmes	3–0	Futbolistas Argentinos Agremiados	Quilmes, Argentina
09:30 GMT-3	T. Blanco; J. Imbert	Olé; 60 min. match		Stadium: Campo Auxiliar; Attendance: 0 (Note: Behind closed doors.)

21 June 2019 Friendly	Quilmes	1–1	Futbolistas Argentinos Agremiados	Quilmes, Argentina
	V. Rodríguez	Quilmes; Olé; 60 min. match	Goal	Stadium: Campo Auxiliar; Attendance: 0 (Note: Behind closed doors.)

28 June 2019 Friendly	Quilmes	4–0	Puerto Nuevo	Quilmes, Argentina
10:00 GMT-3	J. Imbert 6', 29'; J. Giani 27'; T. Blanco 32'	Quilmes; Perspectiva Sur; 60 min. match		Stadium: Predio de Fútbol Juvenil

28 June 2019 Friendly	Quilmes	2–0	Puerto Nuevo	Quilmes, Argentina
	J. L. Valdez 4'; F. Bruera 34'	Quilmes; Perspectiva Sur; 60 min. match		Stadium: Predio de Fútbol Juvenil

3 July 2019 Friendly	Quilmes	0–2	Fénix	Quilmes, Argentina
10:00 GMT-3		Quilmes; Perspectiva Sur; 60 min. match	M. Pérez	Stadium: Predio de Fútbol Juvenil; Attendance: 0 (Note: Behind closed doors.)

3 July 2019 Friendly	Quilmes	2–1	Fénix	Quilmes, Argentina
	M. Fernández 4'; F. Bruera 16'	Quilmes; Perspectiva Sur; 60 min. match	Rodrigo 11'	Stadium: Predio de Fútbol Juvenil; Attendance: 0 (Note: Behind closed doors.)

6 July 2019 Friendly	Quilmes	2–0	Argentino	Quilmes, Argentina
10:00 GMT-3	J. Imbert; L. González	Quilmes; Grupo La Provincia; 60 min. match		Stadium: Estadio Centenario Ciudad de Quilmes; Attendance: 0 (Note: Behind closed doors.)

6 July 2019 Friendly	Quilmes	5–1	Argentino	Quilmes, Argentina
10:00 GMT-3	J. L. Valdez; M. Fernández; A. Batista	Quilmes; Grupo La Provincia; 60 min. match	M. Irala	Stadium: Estadio Centenario Ciudad de Quilmes; Attendance: 0 (Note: Behind closed doors.)

12 July 2019 Friendly	Agropecuario	0–0	Quilmes	Carlos Casares, Argentina
13:00 GMT-3		Perspectiva Sur; 60 min. match		Stadium: Estadio Ofelia Rosenzuaig

12 July 2019 Friendly	Agropecuario	2–0	Quilmes	Carlos Casares, Argentina
	F. Colela	Perspectiva Sur; 60 min. match		Stadium: Estadio Ofelia Rosenzuaig

17 July 2019 Friendly	Quilmes	0–0	Brown	Quilmes, Argentina
		Brown; InfoRegión; 50 min. match		Stadium: Estadio Centenario Ciudad de Quilmes

17 July 2019 Friendly	Quilmes	2–1	Brown	Quilmes, Argentina
	T. López; M. Prost	InfoRegión; 50 min. match	Rojas	Stadium: Estadio Centenario Ciudad de Quilmes

20 July 2019 Friendly	Aldosivi	0–0	Quilmes	Mar del Plata, Argentina
		Aldosivi; 0223		Stadium: Predio Punta Mogotes; Referee: Claudio Comerci (Argentina)

20 July 2019 Friendly	Aldosivi	0–2	Quilmes	Mar del Plata, Argentina
		Aldosivi; 0223	F. Fernández; C. Machado	Stadium: Predio Punta Mogotes

24 July 2019 Friendly	Quilmes	0–0	Talleres	Quilmes, Argentina
		Quilmes; Perspectiva Sur; 70 min. match		Stadium: Estadio Centenario Ciudad de Quilmes; Attendance: 0 (Note: Behind closed doors.)

24 July 2019 Friendly	Quilmes	2–0	Talleres	Quilmes, Argentina
	T. López; L. Pizzo (o.g.)	Quilmes; Perspectiva Sur; 70 min. match		Stadium: Estadio Centenario Ciudad de Quilmes; Attendance: 0 (Note: Behind closed doors.)

27 July 2019 Friendly	Quilmes	Postponed	Almagro	Quilmes, Argentina
				Stadium: Estadio Centenario Ciudad de Quilmes

30 July 2019 Friendly	Quilmes	0–0	Almagro	Quilmes, Argentina
10:00 GMT-3		Perspectiva Sur; 60 min. match		Stadium: Estadio Centenario Ciudad de Quilmes; Attendance: 0 (Note: Behind closed doors.)

30 July 2019 Friendly	Quilmes	0–0	Almagro	Quilmes, Argentina
		Perspectiva Sur; 60 min. match		Stadium: Estadio Centenario Ciudad de Quilmes; Attendance: 0 (Note: Behind closed doors.)

3 August 2019 Friendly	Quilmes	1–0	San Telmo	Quilmes, Argentina
10:00 GMT-3	T. Blanco	Quilmes; Perspectiva Sur; 70 min. match		Stadium: Estadio Centenario Ciudad de Quilmes; Attendance: 0 (Note: Behind closed doors.)

3 August 2019 Friendly	Quilmes	4–0	San Telmo	Quilmes, Argentina
	J. Giani; C. Machado; T. Verón Lupi; J. L. Valdez	Quilmes; Perspectiva Sur; 70 min. match		Stadium: Estadio Centenario Ciudad de Quilmes; Attendance: 0 (Note: Behind closed doors.)

7 August 2019 Friendly	Quilmes	0–0	Villa San Carlos	Quilmes, Argentina
10:00 GMT-3		Quilmes; Perspectiva Sur		Stadium: Estadio Centenario Ciudad de Quilmes; Attendance: 0 (Note: Behind closed doors.)

7 August 2019 Friendly	Quilmes	4–2	Villa San Carlos	Quilmes, Argentina
	J. Giani; L. González; E. Barraza; J. L. Valdez	Quilmes; Perspectiva Sur	P. Miranda; M. Sproat	Stadium: Estadio Centenario Ciudad de Quilmes; Attendance: 0 (Note: Behind closed doors.)

10 August 2019 Friendly	Chacarita Juniors	Cancelled	Quilmes	Argentina
		Perspectiva Sur

== Competitions ==
=== Primera B Nacional ===
==== Results summary ====
Overall								Home						Away					
Pld	W	D	L	GF	GA	GD	Pts	W	D	L	GF	GA	GD	W	D	L	GF	GA	GD
3	2	1	0	3	1	+2	7	1	0	0	1	0	+1	1	1	0	2	1	+1

Last updated: 3 September 2019.
Source: Soccerway

==== Matches ====
The fixtures for the 2019–20 league season were announced on 1 August 2019, with a new format of split zones being introduced. Quilmes were drawn in Zone B.

Win Draw Loss

18 August 2019 1	Tigre	1–2	Quilmes	Victoria, Argentina
17:05 GMT-3	M. Prost 86' (o.g.)	Quilmes; TyC Sports; Soccerway	D. Drocco 14'; F. Álvarez 45+4'	Stadium: Estadio José Dellagiovanna; Referee: Pablo Echavarría (Argentina)

26 August 2019 2	Quilmes	1–0	Defensores de Belgrano	Quilmes, Argentina
21:05 GMT-3	M. Prost 53'	Quilmes; La Voz del Interior; Soccerway		Stadium: Estadio Centenario Ciudad de Quilmes; Referee: Pablo Dóvalo (Argentina)

2 September 2019 3	Gimnasia y Esgrima (M)	0–0	Quilmes	Mendoza, Argentina
21:05 GMT-3		Quilmes; Los Andes; Soccerway		Stadium: Estadio Víctor Antonio Legrotaglie; Referee: Adrián Franklin (Argentina)

9 September 2019 4	Atlético de Rafaela	–	Quilmes	Rafaela, Argentina
21:05 GMT-3				Stadium: Estadio Nuevo Monumental

== Squad statistics ==
=== Appearances and goals ===
No.	Pos.	Nationality	Name	League		Cup		League Cup		Continental		Other		Total		Discipline		Ref
No.	Pos.	Nationality	Name	Apps	Goals	Apps	Goals	Apps	Goals	Apps	Goals	Apps	Goals	Apps	Goals	Yellow card	Red card	Ref
–	GK	Argentina	Esteban Glellel	0	0	—		—		—		0	0	0	0	0	0	
–	GK	Argentina	Marcos Ledesma	3	0	—		—		—		0	0	3	0	1	0	
–	GK	Argentina	Alejandro Medina	0	0	—		—		—		0	0	0	0	0	0	
–	CB	Argentina	Alan Alegre	3	0	—		—		—		0	0	3	0	0	0	
–	LB	Argentina	Federico Álvarez	3	1	—		—		—		0	0	3	1	0	0	
–	DF	Argentina	Elías Barraza	0	0	—		—		—		0	0	0	0	0	0	
–	DF	Argentina	Tomás López	0	0	—		—		—		0	0	0	0	0	0	
–	RB	Argentina	Raúl Lozano	3	0	—		—		—		0	0	3	0	0	0	
–	CB	Argentina	Abel Masuero	3	0	—		—		—		0	0	3	0	0	0	
–	CB	Argentina	Carlos Matheu	0	0	—		—		—		0	0	0	0	0	0	
–	DF	Argentina	Martín Ortega	0	0	—		—		—		0	0	0	0	0	0	
–	DF	Argentina	Sebastián Uzzante	0	0	—		—		—		0	0	0	0	0	0	
–	CM	Argentina	Enzo Acosta	0(3)	0	—		—		—		0	0	0(3)	0	0	0	
–	DM	Argentina	Juan Altamiranda	0(1)	0	—		—		—		0	0	0(1)	0	0	0	
–	DM	Argentina	Alejandro Altuna	2	0	—		—		—		0	0	2	0	3	1	
–	MF	Argentina	Tomás Blanco	0	0	—		—		—		0	0	0	0	0	0	
–	LW	Argentina	Bautista Cejas	0	0	—		—		—		0	0	0	0	0	0	
–	DM	Argentina	David Drocco	3	1	—		—		—		0	0	3	1	0	0	
–	AM	Colombia	Camilo Machado	0	0	—		—		—		0	0	0	0	0	0	
–	LM	Argentina	Matías Noble	0(1)	0	—		—		—		0	0	0(1)	0	0	0	
–	AM	Argentina	Brandon Obregón	0	0	—		—		—		0	0	0	0	0	0	
–	MF	Argentina	Gastón Pinedo	0	0	—		—		—		0	0	0	0	0	0	
–	CM	Argentina	Gabriel Ramírez	3	0	—		—		—		0	0	3	0	0	0	
–	MF	Argentina	Cristian Zabala	1(2)	0	—		—		—		0	0	1(2)	0	0	0	
–	FW	Argentina	Facundo Bruera	0	0	—		—		—		0	0	0	0	0	0	
–	FW	Argentina	Matías Fernández	0	0	—		—		—		0	0	0	0	0	0	
–	FW	Argentina	Justo Giani	0(1)	0	—		—		—		0	0	0(1)	0	0	0	
–	CF	Argentina	Leandro González	3	0	—		—		—		0	0	3	0	1	0	
–	CF	Argentina	Juan Imbert	3	0	—		—		—		0	0	3	0	1	0	
–	CF	Argentina	Martín Prost	3	1	—		—		—		0	0	3	1	0	0	
–	FW	Argentina	José Luis Valdez	0(1)	0	—		—		—		0	0	0(1)	0	0	0	
–	FW	Argentina	Tomás Verón Lupi	0	0	—		—		—		0	0	0	0	0	0	
Own goals				—	0	—		—		—		—	0	—	0	—	—	—

Statistics accurate as of 4 September 2019.

=== Goalscorers ===
Rank	Pos	No.	Nat	Name	League	Cup	League Cup	Continental	Other	Total	Ref
1	DM	–	Argentina	David Drocco	1	0	—	—	0	1	
1	LB	–	Argentina	Federico Álvarez	1	0	—	—	0	1	
1	CF	–	Argentina	Martín Prost	1	0	—	—	0	1	
Own goals					0	0	—	—	0	0	
Totals					3	0	—	—	0	3	—
