= 2024 Primera Nacional =

40th season of the second-tier football league in Argentina

Primera Nacional
- Season: 2024
- Dates: 2 February – 8 December 2024
- Champions: Aldosivi (2nd title)
- Promoted: Aldosivi; San Martín (SJ)
- Relegated: Guillermo Brown; Brown (A); Atlético de Rafaela
- Matches: 745
- Goals: 1,327 (1.78 per match)
- Top goalscorer: Agustín Lavezzi (18 goals)
- Biggest home win: Colón 4–0 Patronato (25 February); Estudiantes (BA) 4–0 Alvarado (18 May); Patronato 4–0 Agropecuario (23 June); San Martín (SJ) 4–0 Chacarita Juniors (25 August); Güemes 4–0 Dep. Maipú (7 September); Patronato 4–0 Estudiantes (BA) (22 September); All Boys 4–0 San Martín (SJ) (5 October); Dep. Madryn 5–1 Almirante Brown (20 October)
- Biggest away win: Dep. Morón 0–4 Def. de Belgrano (17 February); Talleres (RdE) 1–5 Agropecuario (7 April); Brown (A) 0–4 Colón (28 April); Chacarita Juniors 0–4 Quilmes (13 July); Atl. Rafaela 1–5 Nueva Chicago (19 July)
- Highest scoring: Talleres (RdE) 1–5 Agropecuario (7 April); Agropecuario 2–4 Racing (C) (29 June); Atl. Rafaela 1–5 Nueva Chicago (19 July); San Miguel 2–4 Patronato (2 September); Defensores Unidos 3–3 Agropecuario (13 October); Dep. Madryn 5–1 Almirante Brown (20 October)

The 2024 Argentine Primera Nacional, was the 40th season of the Primera Nacional, the second-tier competition of Argentine football. The season began on 2 February and ended on 8 December 2024. Thirty-eight teams competed in the league, thirty-three of which took part in the 2023 season, along with two teams relegated from Primera División, one team promoted from Torneo Federal A and two teams promoted from Primera B Metropolitana.

Aldosivi won their second Primera Nacional title and promoted to Primera División in this season, defeating San Martín (T) 2–0 in the championship final played on 3 November 2024. San Martín (SJ) were the other promoted side, winning the Torneo Reducido after defeating Gimnasia y Esgrima (M) in the final.

== Format ==
For this season, the competition was played under a format similar to the one used in the last season, with the thirty-eight participating teams being split into two zones of 19 teams each, where they played against the other teams in their group twice: once at home and once away, additionally, each team played two interzonal matches against its rival team, which was drawn into the other zone. Teams from the same city or nearby cities were also paired together and drawn into different zones. Both zone winners played a final match on neutral ground to decide the first promoted team to the Liga Profesional for the 2025 season, while the teams placed from second to eighth place in each zone played a knockout tournament (Torneo Reducido) for the second promotion berth along with the loser of the final between the zone winners, which entered the Reducido in the second round. The teams placing last in each zone were relegated at the end of the season, with a third relegated team decided in a playoff match between the sides placing second-from-bottom in each group.

Similar to previous seasons, 15 Primera Nacional teams qualified for the 2025 Copa Argentina through league performance, those being the top seven teams of each zone plus the best eighth-placed one.

== Club information ==
=== Stadia and locations ===
Locations of the 2024 Primera Nacional teams outside Greater Buenos Aires.
Locations of the 2024 Primera Nacional teams within Greater Buenos Aires.

Club	City	Province	Stadium	Capacity
Agropecuario Argentino	Carlos Casares	Buenos Aires	Ofelia Rosenzuaig	8,000
Aldosivi	Mar del Plata	Buenos Aires	José María Minella	35,180
All Boys	Buenos Aires	Capital Federal	Islas Malvinas	12,199
Almagro	José Ingenieros	Buenos Aires	Tres de Febrero	12,500
Almirante Brown	Isidro Casanova	Buenos Aires	Fragata Presidente Sarmiento	25,000
Alvarado	Mar del Plata	Buenos Aires	José María Minella	35,180
Arsenal	Sarandí	Buenos Aires	Julio Humberto Grondona	16,300
Atlanta	Buenos Aires	Capital Federal	Don León Kolbowsky	14,000
Atlético de Rafaela	Rafaela	Santa Fe	Nuevo Monumental	16,000
Brown	Adrogué	Buenos Aires	Lorenzo Arandilla	4,500
Chacarita Juniors	Villa Maipú	Buenos Aires	Chacarita Juniors	19,000
Chaco For Ever	Resistencia	Chaco	Juan Alberto García	23,000
Colón	Santa Fe	Santa Fe	Brigadier Estanislao López	40,000
Defensores de Belgrano	Buenos Aires	Capital Federal	Juan Pasquale	9,000
Defensores Unidos	Zárate	Buenos Aires	Mario Lossino	6,000
Deportivo Madryn	Puerto Madryn	Chubut	Abel Sastre	8,000
Deportivo Maipú	Maipú	Mendoza	Omar Higinio Sperdutti	8,000
Deportivo Morón	Morón	Buenos Aires	Nuevo Francisco Urbano	32,000
Estudiantes	Caseros	Buenos Aires	Ciudad de Caseros	16,740
Estudiantes	Río Cuarto	Córdoba	Antonio Candini	15,000
Ferro Carril Oeste	Buenos Aires	Capital Federal	Ricardo Etcheverri	24,442
Gimnasia y Esgrima	Jujuy	Jujuy	23 de Agosto	23,200
Gimnasia y Esgrima	Mendoza	Mendoza	Víctor Legrotaglie	11,500
Gimnasia y Tiro	Salta	Salta	Gigante del Norte	24,300
Güemes	Santiago del Estero	Santiago del Estero	Arturo Miranda	15,000
Guillermo Brown	Puerto Madryn	Chubut	Raúl Conti	15,000
Mitre	Santiago del Estero	Santiago del Estero	José y Antonio Castiglione	10,500
Nueva Chicago	Buenos Aires	Capital Federal	Nueva Chicago	28,500
Patronato	Paraná	Entre Ríos	Presbítero Bartolomé Grella	22,000
Quilmes	Quilmes	Buenos Aires	Centenario	35,200
Racing	Córdoba	Córdoba	Miguel Sancho	15,000
San Martín	San Juan	San Juan	Ingeniero Hilario Sánchez	17,000
San Martín	Tucumán	Tucumán	La Ciudadela	30,250
San Miguel	Los Polvorines	Buenos Aires	Malvinas Argentinas	7,176
San Telmo	Dock Sud	Buenos Aires	Osvaldo Baletto	2,000
Talleres	Remedios de Escalada	Buenos Aires	Pablo Comelli	16,000
Temperley	Temperley	Buenos Aires	Alfredo Beranger	13,000
Tristán Suárez	Tristán Suárez	Buenos Aires	20 de Octubre	15,000

== Zone A ==
=== Standings ===
Pos	Team	Pld	W	D	L	GF	GA	GD	Pts	Qualification or relegation
1	San Martín (T)	38	24	9	5	43	18	+25	81	Advance to Final and qualification for Copa Argentina
2	San Martín (SJ) (P)	38	19	13	6	40	21	+19	70	Advance to Torneo Reducido and qualification for Copa Argentina
3	Quilmes	38	17	12	9	41	24	+17	60 (Note: Quilmes were deducted 6 points for incidents in their Torneo Reducido match against Gimnasia y Esgrima (M) in the previous season, later reduced to 3 points.)	Advance to Torneo Reducido and qualification for Copa Argentina
4	All Boys	38	15	13	10	34	24	+10	58	Advance to Torneo Reducido and qualification for Copa Argentina
5	Gimnasia y Esgrima (J)	38	17	7	14	32	27	+5	58	Advance to Torneo Reducido and qualification for Copa Argentina
6	Estudiantes (BA)	38	14	14	10	34	32	+2	56	Advance to Torneo Reducido and qualification for Copa Argentina
7	Racing (C)	38	14	11	13	37	36	+1	53	Advance to Torneo Reducido and qualification for Copa Argentina
8	San Miguel	38	13	14	11	34	33	+1	53	Advance to Torneo Reducido
9	Ferro Carril Oeste	38	12	14	12	51	45	+6	50	
10	Agropecuario Argentino	38	13	10	15	44	45	−1	49	
11	Tristán Suárez	38	12	12	14	45	47	−2	48	
12	Deportivo Maipú	38	13	9	16	37	49	−12	48	
13	Güemes	38	10	15	13	32	37	−5	45	
14	Chacarita Juniors	38	11	12	15	35	44	−9	45	
15	Alvarado	38	12	9	17	30	40	−10	45	
16	Patronato	38	10	10	18	36	44	−8	40	
17	Arsenal	38	9	13	16	21	36	−15	40	
18	Talleres (RdE) (O)	38	7	16	15	26	41	−15	37	Qualification for Relegation play-off
19	Guillermo Brown (R)	38	7	12	19	29	44	−15	33	Relegation to Torneo Federal A

Source: AFA
Rules for classification: 1) points; 2) play-off (only for deciding relegation); 3) goal difference; 4) goals scored; 5) head-to-head points; 6) head-to-head goal difference; 7) head-to-head goals scored.
(O) Play-off winners; (P) Promoted; (R) Relegated

=== Results ===
Home \ Away	AGA	ALL	ALV	ARS	CHA	DMA	EBA	FCO	GEJ	GÜE	GBR	PAT	QUI	RAC	SMA	SMT	SMI	TAL	TRI
Agropecuario Argentino	—	2–1	1–1	1–0	2–0	0–0	0–0	1–2	1–2	3–1	2–1	1–0	1–1	2–4	0–1	0–1	2–1	2–0	0–2
All Boys	3–0	—	1–0	1–0	0–0	3–2	0–0	3–0	0–1	0–0	1–1	1–0	0–0	0–0	4–0	0–1	0–0	1–0	1–0
Alvarado	0–3	1–0	—	2–1	2–1	0–1	0–1	0–2	1–0	0–0	2–1	2–0	0–0	3–0	0–0	0–2	1–0	2–0	1–2
Arsenal	1–0	0–1	1–0	—	3–1	2–0	1–1	0–0	0–1	1–1	2–0	2–0	0–0	0–2	0–0	1–1	1–0	2–1	0–2
Chacarita Juniors	2–1	0–1	2–1	0–0	—	2–0	1–1	1–1	0–0	2–0	1–0	1–0	0–4	2–2	1–1	1–0	1–1	0–1	1–2
Deportivo Maipú	1–2	1–2	1–1	1–0	0–2	—	1–0	2–1	2–0	1–1	1–0	3–1	1–1	1–0	0–2	0–2	1–1	0–0	1–0
Estudiantes (BA)	1–0	1–1	4–0	1–0	0–0	2–1	—	1–0	1–0	2–0	2–1	0–0	1–2	1–0	0–0	1–3	1–1	2–1	2–2
Ferro Carril Oeste	3–0	2–2	3–0	1–1	0–2	2–2	2–2	—	2–0	1–1	1–2	1–1	0–2	2–0	0–0	3–1	1–0	0–1	2–2
Gimnasia y Esgrima (J)	1–1	0–1	1–0	1–0	0–1	2–0	2–1	1–0	—	1–0	1–0	1–1	0–2	0–1	1–0	2–0	3–0	2–1	1–0
Güemes	1–1	2–1	2–1	0–1	2–1	4–0	1–0	1–3	1–1	—	1–1	2–1	1–0	0–1	1–0	0–0	2–0	2–1	2–2
Guillermo Brown	0–2	0–0	0–0	2–0	0–3	1–1	3–1	3–1	0–0	1–0	—	1–3	1–2	1–1	0–2	0–1	1–1	1–1	2–1
Patronato	4–0	0–0	1–3	0–0	2–0	1–2	4–0	1–3	1–0	0–0	0–0	—	1–1	2–1	0–3	0–1	0–1	1–1	3–0
Quilmes	1–0	1–0	1–1	0–0	1–0	3–0	1–0	1–4	2–1	1–0	1–0	2–2	—	1–0	0–1	1–2	1–1	0–0	0–1
Racing (C)	1–3	1–0	2–0	3–1	1–1	3–2	0–1	1–1	1–0	2–0	1–2	1–0	1–0	—	0–0	0–1	1–0	1–1	1–1
San Martín (SJ)	0–0	3–0	1–0	0–0	4–0	1–0	0–0	3–2	2–1	1–0	1–0	1–0	0–3	1–2	—	0–0	2–0	3–1	3–2
San Martín (T)	1–0	0–0	1–0	3–0	1–0	2–1	2–0	1–2	1–0	2–2	0–0	2–0	0–0	2–2	1–0	—	1–0	1–0	1–0
San Miguel	1–1	2–1	2–0	3–0	2–1	2–1	0–0	0–0	1–1	1–0	1–0	2–4	1–0	2–0	1–1	1–0	—	0–0	3–2
Talleres (RdE)	1–5	2–2	0–2	0–0	2–1	2–3	0–1	0–0	0–1	0–0	1–1	1–0	1–0	0–0	0–0	1–3	0–0	—	1–0
Tristán Suárez	2–1	1–0	2–2	2–0	0–0	1–2	0–1	1–1	2–1	1–1	3–2	0–1	1–3	1–0	0–1	0–0	1–1	2–2	—

Source: AFA
Legend: Blue = home team win; Yellow = draw; Red = away team win.

== Zone B ==
=== Standings ===
Pos	Team	Pld	W	D	L	GF	GA	GD	Pts	Qualification or relegation
1	Aldosivi (C, P)	38	17	13	8	41	24	+17	64	Advance to Final and qualification for Copa Argentina
2	Deportivo Madryn	38	17	13	8	35	20	+15	64	Advance to Torneo Reducido and qualification for Copa Argentina
3	Nueva Chicago	38	18	10	10	39	25	+14	64	Advance to Torneo Reducido and qualification for Copa Argentina
4	Gimnasia y Esgrima (M)	38	17	12	9	44	33	+11	63	Advance to Torneo Reducido and qualification for Copa Argentina
5	San Telmo	38	18	11	9	49	25	+24	62 (Note: San Telmo were deducted 3 points for incidents prior to their home match against Aldosivi.)	Advance to Torneo Reducido and qualification for Copa Argentina
6	Colón	38	16	10	12	40	26	+14	58	Advance to Torneo Reducido and qualification for Copa Argentina
7	Defensores de Belgrano	38	15	13	10	38	24	+14	58	Advance to Torneo Reducido and qualification for Copa Argentina
8	Gimnasia y Tiro	38	14	16	8	27	22	+5	58	Advance to Torneo Reducido and qualification for Copa Argentina
9	Mitre (SdE)	38	13	18	7	27	20	+7	57	
10	Temperley	38	11	19	8	30	25	+5	52	
11	Estudiantes (RC)	38	12	15	11	27	28	−1	51	
12	Atlanta	38	13	12	13	30	34	−4	51	
13	Deportivo Morón	38	9	14	15	27	38	−11	41	
14	Almagro	38	8	14	16	27	47	−20	38	
15	Chaco For Ever	38	8	13	17	24	30	−6	37	
16	Almirante Brown	38	8	13	17	26	40	−14	37	
17	Defensores Unidos	38	7	14	17	30	46	−16	35	
18	Atlético de Rafaela (R)	38	6	12	20	24	43	−19	30	Qualification for Relegation tiebreaker match
19	Brown (A) (R)	38	5	15	18	21	49	−28	30	Qualification for Relegation tiebreaker match

Source: AFA
Rules for classification: 1) points; 2) play-off (only for deciding relegation); 3) goal difference; 4) goals scored; 5) head-to-head points; 6) head-to-head goal difference; 7) head-to-head goals scored.
(C) Champions; (P) Promoted; (R) Relegated

==== Relegation tiebreaker match ====
Since Atlético de Rafaela and Brown (A) ended up tied in points for 18th place, a tiebreaker match was played to decide the team that would play the relegation play-off as well as the team from Zone B that would be directly relegated. Brown (A) were relegated to Primera B Metropolitana after losing this match.

2 November 2024
16:00 UTC−3

Atlético de Rafaela	2–1	Brown (A)
Tomatis 7'; Aguirre 26'	Report	Masuero 76'

Estadio Único de San Nicolás, San Nicolás de los Arroyos
Referee: Nicolás Ramírez

Team details

Atlético Rafaela
Brown (A)

GK	1	(Argentina) Emanuel Bilbao	Booked
DF	4	(Argentina) Rodrigo Colombo	Booked
DF	2	(Argentina) Francisco Oliver
DF	6	(Argentina) Kevin Jappert (c)	Booked
DF	3	(Argentina) Franco Quiroz
MF	11	(Argentina) Matías Pardo	Booked
MF	5	(Argentina) Matías Fissore		Substituted off
MF	8	(Argentina) Juan Galeano
MF	7	(Argentina) Jonás Aguirre
FW	10	(Argentina) Bautista Tomatis		Substituted off
FW	9	(Argentina) Ricardo Dichiara		Substituted off
Substitutions:
DF	13	(Paraguay) Gustavo Navarro		Substituted on
MF	16	(Argentina) Damiano Jaime		Substituted on
FW	19	(Argentina) Patricio Vidal		Substituted on
Manager:
(Argentina) Iván Juárez

GK	1	(Argentina) Gonzalo Rehak
DF	7	(Argentina) Rafael Sangiovani	Booked
DF	4	(Argentina) Carlos Aguirre	Booked	Substituted off
DF	2	(Argentina) Abel Masuero (c)
DF	6	(Argentina) Máximo Heredia
DF	3	(Argentina) Francisco Nouet	Booked
MF	11	(Argentina) Franco Benítez		Substituted off
MF	5	(Argentina) Gonzalo Desio	Booked
MF	8	(Argentina) Lautaro Lovazzano	Booked	Substituted off
FW	9	(Argentina) Leonel Buter	Booked	Substituted off
FW	10	(Argentina) Matías Sproat		Substituted off
Substitutions:
DF	16	(Argentina) Jonatan Bogado		Substituted on
MF	17	(Argentina) Tomás Patrizio		Substituted on
FW	18	(Argentina) Lucio Castillo		Substituted on
FW	19	(Argentina) Gabriel Tellas		Substituted on
FW	20	(Argentina) Matías Nouet		Substituted on
Manager:
(Argentina) Jorge Vivaldo

=== Results ===
Home \ Away	ALD	ALM	CAB	ATL	ATR	BRO	CFE	COL	DBE	DUN	DEM	DMO	ERC	GEM	GYT	MIT	NCH	STE	TEM
Aldosivi	—	1–0	0–0	2–1	0–1	2–0	1–1	1–0	0–1	1–0	1–0	3–0	1–1	0–0	2–2	0–0	0–0	2–0	1–1
Almagro	1–2	—	1–0	0–0	1–0	0–0	0–0	0–2	1–0	1–1	0–1	2–1	0–1	2–2	0–3	0–0	1–2	1–1	0–0
Almirante Brown	1–0	1–2	—	0–1	1–2	1–2	3–0	0–0	0–2	1–1	0–1	1–1	0–3	0–0	0–0	2–0	0–1	0–0	0–0
Atlanta	0–2	3–0	1–0	—	2–0	1–0	1–0	0–0	0–0	1–1	1–1	1–0	1–1	1–2	1–1	0–0	0–0	2–0	0–2
Atlético de Rafaela	0–2	2–3	1–2	2–0	—	0–0	0–1	0–0	0–1	1–0	0–0	1–2	0–1	4–1	0–0	0–0	1–5	1–2	1–0
Brown (A)	0–1	0–2	2–2	2–3	1–0	—	0–0	0–4	0–3	2–1	0–1	0–0	0–0	0–0	0–0	2–2	0–0	0–0	2–2
Chaco For Ever	1–1	1–1	0–0	2–1	2–0	3–0	—	0–0	3–0	3–0	0–1	0–2	3–0	1–1	0–1	1–1	0–1	1–0	0–1
Colón	1–1	3–0	2–1	1–1	1–0	0–2	1–0	—	2–0	2–1	1–1	1–0	3–0	1–0	1–0	1–2	2–1	0–1	0–0
Defensores de Belgrano	0–2	0–0	3–0	2–0	0–0	3–0	0–0	1–0	—	2–0	2–3	0–0	0–0	0–1	1–0	0–0	1–0	0–1	0–0
Defensores Unidos	1–0	1–1	0–1	0–1	0–0	1–1	0–0	2–1	3–2	—	0–0	2–0	1–0	3–1	0–1	0–0	1–2	2–2	3–1
Deportivo Madryn	0–2	2–0	5–1	3–0	1–1	2–1	1–0	0–0	0–0	3–0	—	0–0	1–0	0–2	0–0	1–0	0–0	1–0	0–1
Deportivo Morón	2–1	0–0	0–1	3–0	1–1	3–0	1–0	0–2	0–4	1–1	0–0	—	2–1	0–1	0–0	1–2	1–0	1–2	0–0
Estudiantes (RC)	2–2	1–0	0–1	1–2	0–0	2–1	0–0	1–2	1–1	2–1	1–0	2–0	—	1–1	0–1	0–0	1–0	0–1	0–0
Gimnasia y Esgrima (M)	2–3	3–1	1–0	2–1	2–1	3–1	1–0	2–0	0–1	2–0	2–1	2–1	0–0	—	0–0	1–1	2–1	1–1	1–2
Gimnasia y Tiro	1–0	1–1	0–0	1–0	1–0	0–1	2–0	1–0	1–0	1–0	0–0	1–1	1–1	1–0	—	1–0	2–0	0–3	0–2
Mitre (SdE)	0–1	2–1	2–1	0–0	2–0	1–0	1–0	2–2	2–0	1–0	1–0	0–0	0–0	0–1	2–1	—	0–0	1–0	0–0
Nueva Chicago	2–1	1–0	1–0	0–1	2–0	1–1	2–0	1–0	0–0	3–0	1–1	1–1	0–1	2–1	2–0	1–0	—	0–3	1–0
San Telmo	1–2	4–1	0–1	0–1	3–2	3–0	2–0	2–0	1–2	2–0	2–1	1–1	2–0	0–0	1–1	0–0	1–0	—	3–0
Temperley	0–0	4–1	1–1	1–1	1–1	1–0	1–1	1–0	0–0	0–0	0–1	3–0	0–1	1–3	1–1	2–0	0–0	0–0	—

Source: AFA
Legend: Blue = home team win; Yellow = draw; Red = away team win.

== Interzonal matches ==
Round	Home	Score	Away
1	Quilmes	2–0	Temperley
2	Almirante Brown	1–2	Tristán Suárez
3	Talleres (RdE)	2–0	Brown (A)
4	Colón	4–0	Patronato
5	Estudiantes (BA)	1–1	Almagro
6	Estudiantes (RC)	0–0	Racing (C)
7	Chacarita Juniors	1–4	Defensores de Belgrano
8	Aldosivi	0–0	Alvarado
9	San Martín (T)	1–0	Chaco For Ever
10	Mitre (SdE)	2–0	Güemes
11	Arsenal	0–0	San Telmo
12	Gimnasia y Tiro	0–0	Gimnasia y Esgrima (J)
13	San Martín (SJ)	2–1	Atlético de Rafaela
14	Gimnasia y Esgrima (M)	0–1	Deportivo Maipú
15	Guillermo Brown	0–1	Deportivo Madryn
16	Nueva Chicago	3–1	Ferro Carril Oeste
17	Agropecuario Argentino	0–0	Defensores Unidos
18	Deportivo Morón	0–1	San Miguel
19	All Boys	1–0	Atlanta

Round	Home	Score	Away
20	Temperley	1–0	Quilmes
21	Tristán Suárez	2–2	Almirante Brown
22	Brown (A)	0–0	Talleres (RdE)
23	Patronato	1–0	Colón
24	Almagro	1–0	Estudiantes (BA)
25	Racing (C)	0–1	Estudiantes (RC)
26	Defensores de Belgrano	2–2	Chacarita Juniors
27	Alvarado	1–0	Aldosivi
28	Chaco For Ever	0–1	San Martín (T)
29	Güemes	0–0	Mitre (SdE)
30	San Telmo	4–0	Arsenal
31	Gimnasia y Esgrima (J)	2–0	Gimnasia y Tiro
32	Atlético de Rafaela	0–0	San Martín (SJ)
33	Deportivo Maipú	0–0	Gimnasia y Esgrima (M)
34	Deportivo Madryn	1–0	Guillermo Brown
35	Ferro Carril Oeste	1–2	Nueva Chicago
36	Defensores Unidos	3–3	Agropecuario Argentino
37	San Miguel	0–1	Deportivo Morón
38	Atlanta	0–1	All Boys

== Championship final ==
The top-ranked teams of each zone played a match on neutral ground to decide the champions and the first team promoted to Primera División. The losing team entered the Torneo Reducido in the second round.

3 November 2024
15:00 UTC−3

Aldosivi	2–0	San Martín (T)
Laméndola 9'; Torres 43'	Report

Estadio Gigante de Arroyito, Rosario
Referee: Yael Falcón Pérez

Team details

Aldosivi
San Martín (T)

GK	1	(Argentina) Jorge Carranza (c)	Booked
DF	4	(Argentina) Rodrigo González
DF	2	(Argentina) Gonzalo Soto
DF	6	(Argentina) Juan Sills
DF	3	(Argentina) Ignacio Guerrico
MF	7	(Argentina) Elías Torres
MF	5	(Argentina) Marcelo Esponda	Booked	Substituted off
MF	8	(Argentina) Gonzalo Piñeiro		Substituted off
MF	10	(Argentina) Natanael Guzmán		Substituted off
MF	11	(Argentina) Nicolás Laméndola		Substituted off
FW	9	(Argentina) Agustín Colazo		Substituted off
Substitutions:
DF	14	(Argentina) Gabriel Paredes		Substituted on
DF	15	(Argentina) Gonzalo Mottes		Substituted on
MF	19	(Argentina) Matías Morello		Substituted on
FW	18	(Argentina) Santiago Luján		Substituted on
FW	21	(Argentina) Agustín Alonso		Substituted on
Manager:
(Argentina) Andrés Yllana

GK	1	(Argentina) Darío Sand (c)
DF	4	(Argentina) Gonzalo Bettini		Substituted off
DF	2	(Argentina) Juan Orellana
DF	6	(Argentina) Agustín Dattola		Substituted off
DF	3	(Argentina) Lucas Diarte	Booked
MF	10	(Argentina) Juan Cuevas
MF	5	(Argentina) Gustavo Abregú
MF	8	(Argentina) Ulises Vera		Substituted off
MF	11	(Argentina) Matías García		Substituted off
FW	7	(Argentina) Lautaro Fedele		Substituted off
FW	9	(Uruguay) Junior Arias
Substitutions:
MF	16	(Chile) Pablo Hernández		Substituted on
FW	18	(Argentina) Nicolás Moreno		Substituted on
FW	19	(Argentina) Gonzalo E. Rodríguez		Substituted on
FW	20	(Argentina) Gonzalo Klusener		Substituted on
Manager:
(Argentina) Diego Flores

== Torneo Reducido ==
The teams placing second to eighth place in each zone, along with the loser of the championship final will play the Torneo Reducido for the second and last promotion berth to Primera División, in which teams will be seeded in each round according to their final placement in the first stage of the tournament. The first round was played over a single leg, at the stadium of the higher-seeded team. The second round (in which the championship final loser will enter the Reducido) and the semi-finals will be played over two legs, with the higher-seeded team hosting the second leg, whilst the final will be played as a single match on neutral ground. In all rounds except for the final, the higher-seeded team will advance in case of a tie, with extra time and a penalty shoot-out set to be played in case of a draw in the final.

=== First round ===
2 November 2024	San Telmo	1–0	Gimnasia y Esgrima (J)	Dock Sud
13:45 UTC−3	Maidana 1' (o.g.)	Report		Stadium: Osvaldo Baletto; Referee: Gastón Monsón Brizuela

2 November 2024	Gimnasia y Esgrima (M) (bsr)	1–1	Estudiantes (BA)	Mendoza
17:00 UTC−3	Silba 65' (pen.)	Report	Acosta 90+10' (pen.)	Stadium: Víctor Legrotaglie; Referee: Maximiliano Macheroni

2 November 2024	Quilmes	2–0	Defensores de Belgrano	Quilmes
20:05 UTC−3	Enrique 11'; Herrera 45+1'	Report		Stadium: Centenario Ciudad de Quilmes; Referee: Ariel Penel

3 November 2024	Nueva Chicago (bsr)	1–1	Racing (C)	Buenos Aires
13:00 UTC−3	Ortiz 74'	Report	Nasta 7'	Stadium: Nueva Chicago; Referee: Luis Lobo Medina

3 November 2024	Deportivo Madryn (bsr)	0–0	San Miguel	Puerto Madryn
17:00 UTC−3		Report		Stadium: Abel Sastre; Referee: Daniel Zamora

3 November 2024	San Martín (SJ)	2–1	Gimnasia y Tiro	San Juan
18:00 UTC−3	González 47'; Funez 85'	Report	Rojas 55'	Stadium: Ingeniero Hilario Sánchez; Referee: Pablo Dóvalo

4 November 2024	All Boys (bsr)	1–1	Colón	Buenos Aires
21:10 UTC−3	Ferrari 58'	Report	Soñora 84'	Stadium: Islas Malvinas; Referee: Juan Pafundi

=== Second round ===
Team 1	Agg.	Team 2	1st leg	2nd leg
San Telmo	1–4	San Martín (T)	1–2	0–2
All Boys	2–3	San Martín (SJ)	0–1	2–2
Gimnasia y Esgrima (M)	3–2	Deportivo Madryn	3–1	0–1
Quilmes	0–1	Nueva Chicago	0–0	0–1

==== First leg ====
9 November 2024	San Telmo	1–2	San Martín (T)	Dock Sud
13:40 UTC−3	Tisera 86'	Report	Hernández 61'; Fedele 76'	Stadium: Osvaldo Baletto; Referee: Franco Acita

9 November 2024	Gimnasia y Esgrima (M)	3–1	Deportivo Madryn	Mendoza
17:45 UTC−3	Padilla 10'; Silba 32'; Romano 73'	Report	Peinipil 4'	Stadium: Víctor Legrotaglie; Referee: Mario Ejarque

9 November 2024	All Boys	0–1	San Martín (SJ)	Buenos Aires
19:00 UTC−3		Report	Funez 78'	Stadium: Islas Malvinas; Referee: Pablo Giménez

10 November 2024	Quilmes	0–0	Nueva Chicago	Quilmes
19:20 UTC−3		Report		Stadium: Centenario Ciudad de Quilmes; Referee: Bryan Ferreyra

==== Second leg ====
16 November 2024	Nueva Chicago	1–0 (1–0 agg.)	Quilmes	Buenos Aires
17:00 UTC−3	Paz 46'	Report		Stadium: Nueva Chicago; Referee: Juan Pablo Loustau

17 November 2024	Deportivo Madryn	1–0 (2–3 agg.)	Gimnasia y Esgrima (M)	Puerto Madryn
17:00 UTC−3	Ferreyra 54'	Report		Stadium: Abel Sastre; Referee: Julio Barraza

17 November 2024	San Martín (SJ)	2–2 (3–2 agg.)	All Boys	San Juan
18:50 UTC−3	Casa 77', 90+10'	Report	Toloza 48'; Assennato 63'	Stadium: Ingeniero Hilario Sánchez; Referee: Fabrizio Llobet

17 November 2024	San Martín (T)	2–0 (4–1 agg.)	San Telmo	San Miguel de Tucumán
21:10 UTC−3	Arias 9'; Orellana 20'	Report		Stadium: La Ciudadela; Referee: Andrés Gariano

=== Semi-finals ===
Team 1	Agg.	Team 2	1st leg	2nd leg
Gimnasia y Esgrima (M)	1–0	San Martín (T)	0–0	1–0
Nueva Chicago	2–2	San Martín (SJ) (bsr)	2–1	0–1

==== First leg ====
24 November 2024	Nueva Chicago	2–1	San Martín (SJ)	Buenos Aires
17:00 UTC−3	Maggi 46'; Vega 90+2'	Report	Montagna 24'	Stadium: Nueva Chicago; Referee: Ariel Penel

25 November 2024	Gimnasia y Esgrima (M)	0–0	San Martín (T)	Mendoza
21:10 UTC−3		Report		Stadium: Víctor Legrotaglie; Referee: Gastón Monsón Brizuela

==== Second leg ====
1 December 2024	San Martín (T)	0–1 (0–1 agg.)	Gimnasia y Esgrima (M)	San Miguel de Tucumán
19:05 UTC−3		Report	Silba 24'	Stadium: La Ciudadela; Referee: Bryan Ferreyra

1 December 2024	San Martín (SJ) (bsr)	1–0 (2–2 agg.)	Nueva Chicago	San Juan
19:15 UTC−3	Montagna 43'	Report		Stadium: Ingeniero Hilario Sánchez; Referee: Fernando Echenique

=== Final ===
The winning team promoted to Primera División for the 2025 season.

Torneo Reducido Final
(2nd. Promotion playoff)
8 December 2024
17:00 UTC−3

Gimnasia y Esgrima (M)	0–2	San Martín (SJ)
	Report	F. González 54'; Funez 77'

Estadio Julio César Villagra, Córdoba
Referee: Nicolás Ramírez

Team details

Gimnasia y Esgrima (M)
San Martín (SJ)

GK	1	(Argentina) Matías Tagliamonte
DF	4	(Argentina) Federico Torres
DF	2	(Argentina) Diego Mondino
DF	6	(Argentina) Maximiliano Padilla (c)
DF	3	(Argentina) Matías Recalde
MF	10	(Argentina) Jeremías Rodríguez		Substituted off
MF	5	(Argentina) Ignacio Antonio
MF	11	(Argentina) Fermín Antonini		Substituted off
MF	7	(Argentina) Nazareno Solís	Booked	Substituted off
FW	8	(Argentina) Nicolás Romano		Substituted off
FW	9	(Argentina) Luis Silba
Substitutions:
FW	13	(Argentina) Gastón Espósito		Substituted on
FW	19	(Argentina) Leandro Ciccolini		Substituted on
FW	20	(Argentina) Aarón Spetale		Substituted on
DF	21	(Argentina) Agustín Bindella		Substituted on Booked
Manager:
(Argentina) Ezequiel Medrán

GK	1	(Argentina) Matías Borgogno	Booked
DF	4	(Argentina) Alejandro Molina		Substituted off
DF	2	(Argentina) Rodrigo Cáseres
DF	6	(Argentina) Agustín Sienra
DF	3	(Argentina) Dante Álvarez
MF	5	(Argentina) Nicolás Pelaitay (c)
MF	8	(Argentina) Lautaro Escalante		Substituted off
MF	10	(Argentina) Sebastián González		Substituted off
FW	7	(Argentina) Maximiliano Casa	Booked	Substituted off
FW	9	(Argentina) Federico González	Booked	Substituted off
FW	11	(Argentina) Ezequiel Montagna
Substitutions:
DF	13	(Argentina) Agustín Heredia		Substituted on
MF	15	(Argentina) Gino Olguín		Substituted on
DF	16	(Argentina) Máximo Masino		Substituted on
MF	19	(Argentina) Maximiliano Gutiérrez		Substituted on
FW	23	(Argentina) Nazareno Fúnez		Substituted on
Manager:
(Argentina) Raúl Antuña

== Relegation play-off ==
The teams placing second-from-bottom in each zone played a match on neutral ground to decide the third and last relegated team. Atlético de Rafaela were relegated to Torneo Federal A after being defeated by Talleres (RdE) in this match.

13 November 2024
17:00 UTC−3

Talleres (RdE)	2–1 (a.e.t.)	Atlético de Rafaela
Duré 52'; Pulicastro 92'	Report	Pardo 77'

Estadio Eva Perón, Junín
Referee: Pablo Dóvalo

Team details

Talleres (RdE)
Atlético de Rafaela

GK	1	Damián Tello
DF	4	Luciano Sánchez
DF	2	Nicolás Monserrat
DF	6	Nicolás Malvacio	Booked
DF	3	Patricio Romero
MF	7	Diego Nakache		Substituted off
MF	5	Fernando Duré	Booked
MF	10	Fernando Enrique (c)	Booked
MF	8	Tomás Asprea		Substituted off
FW	9	Nicolás Molina	Booked	Substituted off
FW	11	Franco Pulicastro	Booked	Substituted off
Substitutions:
DF	13	David Achucarro		Substituted on
MF	19	Alejandro Benítez		Substituted on
MF	20	Jeremías Denis		Substituted on
FW	22	Matías Donato		Substituted on
Manager:
(Argentina) Mario Gómez

GK	1	Emanuel Bilbao
DF	4	Rodrigo Colombo		Substituted off
DF	6	Kevin Jappert (c)	Booked
DF	2	Francisco Oliver
DF	3	Franco Quiroz
MF	11	Matías Pardo	Booked
MF	5	Matías Fissore		Substituted off
MF	8	Juan Galeano	Booked	Substituted off
MF	7	Jonás Aguirre		Substituted off
FW	10	Bautista Tomatis		Substituted off
FW	9	Ricardo Dichiara		Substituted off
Substitutions:
FW	17	Matías J. Valdivia		Substituted on
FW	18	Lucas Albertengo		Substituted on
FW	19	Patricio Vidal		Substituted on
FW	20	Valentín Luciani		Substituted on
FW	21	Valentino Gandín	Substituted on
FW	23	Lisandro Merlino		Substituted on
Manager:
(Argentina) Iván Juárez

== Copa Argentina qualification ==
Fifteen Primera Nacional teams qualified for the round of 32 of the 2025 Copa Argentina, which were the top seven teams of each zone and the best eighth-placed team at the end of the season, which was selected according to points, goal difference, goals scored, and a drawing of lots if needed.

=== Ranking of eighth-placed teams ===
Pos	Grp	Team	Pld	W	D	L	GF	GA	GD	Pts	Qualification
1	B	Gimnasia y Tiro	38	14	16	8	27	22	+5	58	Qualification for Copa Argentina
2	A	San Miguel	38	13	14	11	34	33	+1	53	

Source: AFA
Rules for classification: 1) Points; 2) Goal difference; 3) Goals scored; 4) Drawing of lots.

== Season statistics ==
=== Top scorers ===
Rank	Player	Club	Goals
1	(Argentina) Agustín Lavezzi	Tristán Suárez	18
2	(Argentina) Bruno Nasta	Racing (C)	17
3	(Argentina) Agustín Colazo	Aldosivi	15
4	(Argentina) Facundo Castro	Nueva Chicago	13
5	(Argentina) Ezequiel Aguirre	Defensores de Belgrano	12
6	(Argentina) Alejandro Gagliardi	Agropecuario Argentino	11
6	(Argentina) Misael Sosa	Deportivo Maipú	11
6	(Argentina) Nicolás Retamar	Ferro Carril Oeste	11
6	(Argentina) Nazareno Funez	San Martín (SJ)	11
6	(Uruguay) Junior Arias	San Martín (T)	11

== See also ==
- 2024 Argentine Primera División
- 2024 Copa Argentina
- 2024 Primera B Metropolitana
- 2024 Torneo Federal A
- 2024 Primera C Metropolitana
