= Carlos Casares =

Carlos Casares may refer to:

- Carlos Casares (governor) (1830–1883), Argentine rancher, executive, and politician
- Carlos Casares (writer) (1941–2002), Galician language writer
- Carlos Casares, Buenos Aires, a town in Buenos Aires Province, Argentina
- Carlos Casares Partido, a partido of Buenos Aires Province in Argentina
