= Jose Valdez =

Jose Valdez may refer to:

- Jose F. Valdez (1925–1945), United States Army soldier and Medal of Honor recipient
- Jose Valdez (American football) (born 1986), American former football player
- José Valdez (baseball, born 1983), Dominican former baseball pitcher for the Houston Astros
- José Valdez (baseball, born 1990), Dominican baseball pitcher
- José Mario Váldez (born 1931), Salvadoran sport shooter
- José Luis Valdez (born 1998), Argentine footballer
