= Raúl Lozano =

Raúl Lozano may refer to:

- Raúl Lozano (footballer) (born 1997), Argentine footballer
- Raúl Lozano (volleyball) (born 1956), Argentine volleyball player
