= Cristian Zabala =

Argentine footballer

Personal information
- Full name: Cristian Exequiel Zabala
- Date of birth: 4 March 1998 (age 28)
- Place of birth: Solano, Argentina
- Height: 1.87 m (6 ft 2 in)
- Position: Midfielder

Team information
- Current team: Sarmiento
- Number: 15

Youth career
- Quilmes

Senior career*
Years	Team	Apps	(Gls)
2018–2020	Quilmes	24	(1)
2020–2024	Tigre	105	(3)
2024–2026	Independiente del Valle	45	(5)
2026–	Sarmiento	30	(1)
- * Club domestic league appearances and goals as of 18:08, 10 November 2026 (UTC)

Cristian Exequiel Zabala (born 4 March 1998) is an Argentine professional footballer who plays as a midfielder for Sarmiento.

== Career ==
Zabala began with Quilmes. He made his professional debut against Atlético de Rafaela on 27 August 2018, coming off the substitutes bench after seventy-eight minutes in place of Augusto Max. After another sub appearance versus Los Andes in the succeeding September, Zabala's first start in senior football arrived during a 1–1 draw away to Villa Dálmine on 20 October.

On 26 October 2020, Zabala joined Tigre.

== Career statistics ==
As of 18 May 2025.

Appearances and goals by club, season and competition
Club	Division	League			Cup		Continental		Total	
Club	Division	Season	Apps	Goals	Apps	Goals	Apps	Goals	Apps	Goals
Quilmes	Primera B Nacional	2018-19	5	0	—		—		5	0
Quilmes	Primera B Nacional	2019-20	19	1	—		—		19	1
Quilmes	Total		24	1	0	0	0	0	24	1
Tigre	Primera B Nacional	2020	8	0	0	0	—		8	0
Tigre	Primera B Nacional	2021	27	2	4	0	—		31	2
Tigre	Argentine Primera División	2022	38	0	2	0	—		40	0
Tigre	Argentine Primera División	2023	32	1	1	0	8	0	41	1
Tigre	Total		105	3	7	0	8	0	120	3
Independiente del Valle	Ecuadorian Serie A	2024	30	4	5	0	7	0	42	4
Independiente del Valle	Ecuadorian Serie A	2025	11	0	0	0	5	0	16	0
Independiente del Valle	Total		41	4	5	0	12	0	58	4
Career total			170	7	12	0	20	0	202	8
