= Agustín Bellone =

Argentine footballer

Personal information
- Full name: Agustín Omar Bellone
- Date of birth: 2 February 1993 (age 33)
- Place of birth: San Cristóbal, Argentina
- Height: 1.80 m (5 ft 11 in)
- Position: Right-back

Team information
- Current team: Olimpo

Youth career
- Colón

Senior career*
| Years | Team | Apps | (Gls) |
| 2014 | Colón | 0 | (0) |
| 2014–2015 | Juventud Antoniana | 38 | (1) |
| 2016–2017 | Gimnasia y Tiro | 18 | (1) |
| 2017–2018 | Juventud Antoniana | 23 | (2) |
| 2018–2019 | Villa Dálmine | 1 | (0) |
| 2019–2020 | Crucero del Norte | 15 | (3) |
| 2020–2021 | Huracán CR | 4 | (0) |
| 2021–2022 | Sportivo Peñarol | 25 | (2) |
| 2022–2023 | Olimpo | 20 | (2) |
| 2023–2024 | Güemes | 23 | (4) |
| 2024–2025 | Chaco For Ever | 26 | (0) |
| 2025–2026 | Los Andes | 19 | (0) |
| 2026– | Olimpo | 1 | (0) |
- * Club domestic league appearances and goals as of 16:42, 14 April 2026 (UTC)

Agustín Omar Bellone (born 2 February 1993) is an Argentine professional footballer who plays as a defender for Olimpo.

== Career ==
Bellone got his senior career underway with Colón. He didn't feature competitively for the club, though was an unused substitute for a Primera División fixture against Racing Club on 8 February 2014. In the succeeding June, Bellone moved to Torneo Federal A's Juventud Antoniana. His senior bow arrived on 29 August versus Central Córdoba. His first goal came in 2015 during a draw with Altos Hornos Zapla. Bellone joined Gimnasia y Tiro the following year, but missed the 2016 campaign after suffering a serious kidney injury, which put him into intensive care and threatened his career, on his Copa Argentina bow on 31 January.

A return to Juventud Antoniana for Bellone was confirmed on 21 July 2017, though he was on the move once again eleven months later after agreeing terms with Villa Dálmine of Primera B Nacional on 18 June 2018. His first appearance was in a 2–1 defeat away to Independiente Rivadavia on 7 October.

== Personal life ==
Bellone is the brother of professional footballer Mauro Bellone, while Lucas Acosta is his brother-in-law.

== Career statistics ==
As of 30 March 2019.

Appearances and goals by club, season and competition
| Club | Season | League | | | Cup | | Continental | | Other | | Total | |
| Club | Season | Division | Apps | Goals | Apps | Goals | Apps | Goals | Apps | Goals | Apps | Goals |
|---|---|---|---|---|---|---|---|---|---|---|---|---|
| Colón | 2013–14 | Primera División | 0 | 0 | 0 | 0 | — | | 0 | 0 | 0 | 0 |
| Juventud Antoniana | 2014 | Torneo Federal A | 12 | 0 | 0 | 0 | — | | 2 (Note: Appearance(s) in the Torneo Federal A play-offs) | 0 | 14 | 0 |
| Juventud Antoniana | 2015 | Torneo Federal A | 26 | 1 | 0 | 0 | — | | 3 | 0 | 29 | 1 |
| Juventud Antoniana | Total | | 38 | 1 | 0 | 0 | — | | 5 | 0 | 43 | 1 |
| Gimnasia y Tiro | 2016 | Torneo Federal A | 0 | 0 | 1 | 0 | — | | 0 | 0 | 1 | 0 |
| Gimnasia y Tiro | 2016–17 | Torneo Federal A | 18 | 1 | 1 | 1 | — | | 2 | 0 | 21 | 2 |
| Gimnasia y Tiro | Total | | 18 | 1 | 2 | 1 | — | | 2 | 0 | 22 | 2 |
| Juventud Antoniana | 2017–18 | Torneo Federal A | 23 | 2 | 2 | 0 | — | | 0 | 0 | 25 | 2 |
| Villa Dálmine | 2018–19 | Primera B Nacional | 1 | 0 | 0 | 0 | — | | 0 | 0 | 1 | 0 |
| Career total | | | 80 | 4 | 4 | 1 | — | | 7 | 0 | 91 | 5 |
