= Jorge Carranza =

Argentine footballer (born 1981)

Personal information
- Full name: Jorge Carlos Carranza
- Date of birth: 7 May 1981 (age 45)
- Place of birth: Jesús María, Argentina
- Height: 1.87 m (6 ft 2 in)
- Position: Goalkeeper

Youth career
- Instituto

Senior career*
Years	Team	Apps	(Gls)
2002–2011	Instituto	126	(0)
2003	→ Rivadavia (loan)	0	(0)
2008–2009	→ Godoy Cruz (loan)	1	(0)
2011–2012	Atlético Rafaela	1	(0)
2012–2013	Ferro Carril Oeste	37	(0)
2013–2014	Godoy Cruz	36	(0)
2014–2016	O'Higgins	59	(0)
2016–2017	Colón	2	(0)
2017	Atlético Rafaela	3	(0)
2018	Olimpo	9	(0)
2018–2019	San Martín Tucumán	17	(0)
2019	Correcaminos UAT	5	(0)
2020	Boca Unidos	5	(0)
2020–2024	Instituto	99	(0)
2024–2025	Aldosivi	64	(0)
Total		464	(0)
- * Club domestic league appearances and goals as of 17:33, 28 November 2025 (UTC)

Jorge Carlos Carranza (born 7 May 1981) is an Argentine former professional footballer who played as a goalkeeper.

== Career statistics ==
=== Club ===
As of 6 February 2025.

Club	Season	League			Cup		Other		Total	
Club	Season	Division	Apps	Goals	Apps	Goals	Apps	Goals	Apps	Goals
Godoy Cruz (loan)	2008–09	Argentine Primera División	1	0	—		—		1	0
Instituto	2009–10	Primera Nacional	37	0	—		—		37	0
Instituto	2010–11	Primera Nacional	36	0	—		—		36	0
Instituto	Total		73	0	0	0	0	0	73	0
Atlético Rafaela	2011–12	Argentine Primera División	1	0	3	0	—		4	0
Ferro Carril Oeste	2012–13	Primera Nacional	37	0	1	0	—		38	0
Godoy Cruz	2013–14	Argentine Primera División	36	0	0	0	—		36	0
O'Higgins	2014–15	Chilean Primera División	32	0	1	0	—		33	0
O'Higgins	2015–16	Chilean Primera División	27	0	7	0	—		34	0
O'Higgins	Total		59	0	8	0	0	0	67	0
Colón	2016–17	Argentine Primera División	2	0	1	0	—		3	0
Atlético Rafaela	2017–18	Primera Nacional	3	0	1	0	—		4	0
Olimpo	2017–18	Argentine Primera División	9	0	0	0	—		9	0
San Martín Tucumán	2018–19	Argentine Primera División	17	0	0	0	1 (Note: Appearance in Torneos de Verano)	0	18	0
Correcaminos UAT	2019–20	Liga de Expansión MX	5	0	1	0	—		6	0
Boca Unidos	2019–20	Torneo Federal A	5	0	1	0	—		6	0
Instituto	2019–20	Primera Nacional	1	0	0	0	—		1	0
Instituto	2020–21	Primera Nacional	8	0	0	0	—		8	0
Instituto	2021	Primera Nacional	33	0	0	0	—		33	0
Instituto	2022	Primera Nacional	40	0	0	0	—		40	0
Instituto	2023	Argentine Primera División	17	0	1	0	—		18	0
Instituto	Total		99	0	1	0	0	0	100	0
Aldosivi	2024	Primera Nacional	35	0	0	0	—		35	0
Aldosivi	2025	Argentine Primera División	3	0	0	0	—		3	0
Aldosivi	Total		38	0	0	0	0	0	38	0
Career total			385	0	17	0	1	0	403	0

== Honours ==
Instituto

- Primera B Nacional: 2003–04
