= Bellocq, Buenos Aires =

Bellocq
- Town
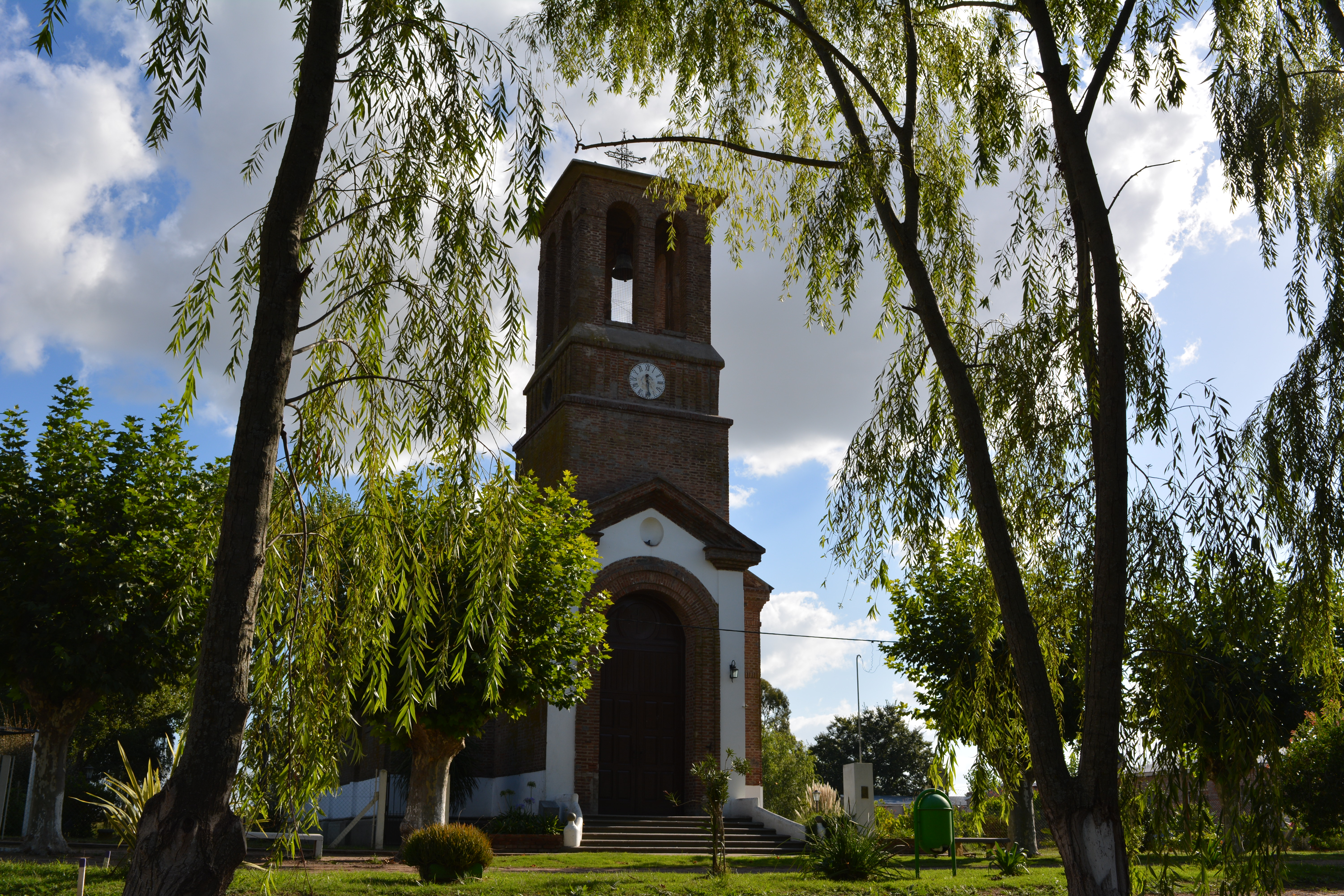
- Church in Bellocq

- Location within Buenos Aires Province
- Coordinates: 35°55′S 61°32′W
- Country: Argentina
- Province: Buenos Aires
- Partidos: Carlos Casares
- Established: 1912
- Elevation: 79 m (259 ft)

Population (2001 Census)
  - Total: 497
- Time zone: UTC−3 (ART)
- CPA Base: B 6535
- Climate: Dfc

Bellocq is a town located in the Carlos Casares Partido in the province of Buenos Aires, Argentina.

== History ==
Bellocq was established in 1912 by a woman named María Larramendy de Bellocq. A railroad and railway station was constructed in the town in 1929, leading to further growth.

A church was constructed in the town in 1914 by a group of Benedictine monks.

In 2012, work began on a 50 km (31 mi) long canal which ran through the town in order to divert rainwater which caused flooding. The canal was completed in 2022.

== Economy ==
Bellocq is a major producer of chamomile, which is both grown and produced near the town.

== Population ==
Bellocq had a population of 497 as of the 2001 census.
