= Gastón Pinedo =

Argentine footballer

Personal information
- Full name: Gastón Pinedo Zabala
- Date of birth: 18 February 1998 (age 28)
- Place of birth: Quilmes, Argentina
- Height: 1.71 m (5 ft 7 in)
- Position: Midfielder

Team information
- Current team: Sacachispas

Youth career
- 2012–2017: Quilmes

Senior career*
Years	Team	Apps	(Gls)
2017–2020	Quilmes	2	(0)
2020	Rosario Puerto Belgrano		
2020–	Sacachispas	0	(0)
- * Club domestic league appearances and goals as of 07:14, 24 March 2019 (UTC)

Gastón Pinedo Zabala (born 18 February 1998) is an Argentine professional footballer who plays as a midfielder for Sacachispas.

== Career ==
Pinedo started with Quilmes, signing in 2012. The club were relegated from the Primera División in 2016–17, with Pinedo not featuring at senior level though he was once an unused substitute for a fixture versus Estudiantes in June 2017. He returned to their reserves throughout 2017–18, prior to reappearing in their first-team in 2018–19. His professional debut arrived on 2 February 2019 as they drew at home to Temperley, participating for sixty-five minutes before being substituted for David Drocco. Pinedo, in February 2020, terminated his contract; subsequently joining Rosario Puerto Belgrano in Liga del Sur.

In July 2020, Pinedo penned a contract with Sacachispas of Primera B Metropolitana.

== Career statistics ==
As of 30 August 2020.

Appearances and goals by club, season and competition
Club	Season	League			Cup		League Cup		Continental		Other		Total	
Club	Season	Division	Apps	Goals	Apps	Goals	Apps	Goals	Apps	Goals	Apps	Goals	Apps	Goals
Quilmes	2016–17	Primera División	0	0	0	0	—		—		0	0	0	0
Quilmes	2017–18	Primera B Nacional	0	0	0	0	—		—		0	0	0	0
Quilmes	2018–19	Primera B Nacional	2	0	0	0	—		—		0	0	2	0
Quilmes	2019–20	Primera B Nacional	0	0	0	0	—		—		0	0	0	0
Quilmes	Total		2	0	0	0	—		—		0	0	2	0
Sacachispas	2020–21	Primera B Metropolitana	0	0	0	0	—		—		0	0	0	0
Career total			2	0	0	0	—		—		0	0	2	0
