= Tomás Leónides López =

Argentine footballer

Tomás López
Personal information
- Full name: Tomás Leónides López
- Date of birth: 27 June 1997 (age 29)
- Place of birth: Curuzú Cuatiá, Argentina
- Height: 1.82 m (6 ft 0 in)
- Position: Defender

Team information
- Current team: Quilmes

Youth career
- 2005–2011: Club Campito
- 2011–2016: Quilmes

Senior career*
Years	Team	Apps	(Gls)
2016–	Quilmes	25	(0)
- * Club domestic league appearances and goals as of 22:51, 16 March 2019 (UTC)

Tomás Leónides López (born 27 June 1997) is an Argentine professional footballer who plays as a defender for Quilmes.

== Career ==
López began in the ranks of Club Campito in 2005, prior to signing for Quilmes in 2011. He was moved into their senior side towards the end of the 2016–17 Primera División season, making his debut on 5 May 2017 against San Martín before going on to feature in the club's final three fixtures versus Atlético de Rafaela, Arsenal de Sarandí and Estudiantes as they suffered relegation. López subsequently made twelve appearances in his opening Primera B Nacional campaign, notably getting sent off on his second appearance in the competition versus Instituto in December 2017.

== Career statistics ==
As of 16 March 2019.

Appearances and goals by club, season and competition
Club	Season	League			Cup		Continental		Other		Total	
Club	Season	Division	Apps	Goals	Apps	Goals	Apps	Goals	Apps	Goals	Apps	Goals
Quilmes	2016–17	Primera División	4	0	1	0	—		0	0	5	0
Quilmes	2017–18	Primera B Nacional	12	0	0	0	—		0	0	12	0
Quilmes	2018–19	Primera B Nacional	9	0	0	0	—		0	0	9	0
Career total			25	0	1	0	—		0	0	26	0
