= Juan Bautista Cejas =

Argentine professional footballer

Bautista Cejas
Personal information
- Full name: Juan Bautista Cejas
- Date of birth: 6 March 1998 (age 28)
- Place of birth: La Plata, Argentina
- Height: 1.72 m (5 ft 7 1/2 in)
- Position: Winger

Team information
- Current team: Ethnikos Achna (on loan from Godoy Cruz)
- Number: 7

Youth career
- Estudiantes

Senior career*
Years	Team	Apps	(Gls)
2017–2019	Estudiantes	16	(1)
2019–2023	Montevideo City	48	(5)
2019–2020	→ Quilmes (loan)	9	(0)
2020–2021	→ Lommel (loan)	14	(2)
2023	Arsenal Sarandí	13	(4)
2024–	Godoy Cruz	23	(0)
2025–	→ Ethnikos Achna (loan)	21	(1)

International career
2015	Argentina U17	6	(0)
- * Club domestic league appearances and goals as of 14 June 2026

Juan Bautista Cejas (born 6 March 1998), is an Argentine professional footballer who plays as a winger for Cypriot First Division club Ethnikos Achna, on loan from Godoy Cruz.
