= Martín Prost =

Argentine footballer

Personal information
- Full name: Martín Sebastián Prost
- Date of birth: 11 July 1988 (age 38)
- Place of birth: Pigüé, Argentina
- Height: 1.78 m (5 ft 10 in)
- Position: Striker

Team information
- Current team: Nacional Potosí
- Number: 20

Senior career*
| Years | Team | Apps | (Gls) |
| 2011–2012 | Huracán de Tres Arroyos | 21 | (1) |
| 2012–2013 | CAI | 34 | (16) |
| 2013–2014 | Sarmiento | 7 | (0) |
| 2014 | Gimnasia de Mendoza | 11 | (1) |
| 2015 | Gimnasia (Concepción del Uruguay) | 30 | (15) |
| 2016–2017 | Juventud Unida (Gualeguaychú) | 46 | (8) |
| 2017–2018 | Agropecuario | 23 | (6) |
| 2018–2019 | Sport Boys Warnes | 50 | (22) |
| 2019 | Quilmes | 11 | (1) |
| 2020–2021 | Gimnasia de Jujuy | 10 | (0) |
| 2021 | Independiente Petrolero | 30 | (18) |
| 2022 | The Strongest | 38 | (12) |
| 2023– | Nacional Potosí | 56 | (30) |
- * Club domestic league appearances and goals

Martín Sebastián Prost (born 11 July 1988) is an Argentine footballer who plays as a striker for Nacional Potosí.

== Career ==
In 2011, Prost signed for Argentine third-tier side Huracán de Tres Arroyos. In 2012, he signed for CAI in the Argentine fourth tier. In 2013, Prost signed for Argentine second-tier club Sarmiento, where he made 8 appearances and scored 0 goals. On 7 October 2013, he debuted for Sarmiento during a 1–2 loss to Instituto. In 2014, Prost signed for Gimnasia de Mendoza in the Argentine third tier.

In 2016, he signed for Argentine second-tier team Juventud Unida (Gualeguaychú). In 2018, he signed for Sport Boys in Bolivia. In 2019, Prost signed for Argentine outfit Quilmes. In 2021, he signed for Independiente Petrolero in Bolivia, helping them win their only league title. He was the top scorer of the 2021 Bolivian Primera División with 18 goals.
