= Federico Álvarez =

Argentine footballer

Personal information
- Full name: Federico Hernán Álvarez
- Date of birth: 7 August 1994 (age 32)
- Place of birth: Córdoba, Argentina
- Height: 1.83 m (6 ft 0 in)
- Position: Left-back

Team information
- Current team: Tigre
- Number: 24

Senior career*
Years	Team	Apps	(Gls)
2012–2019	Belgrano	59	(0)
2017–2018	→ Quilmes (loan)	24	(0)
2019–2020	Quilmes	21	(1)
2020–2025	Asteras Tripolis	136	(3)
2025–	Tigre	37	(0)
- * Club domestic league appearances and goals as of 17:54, 9 November 2026 (UTC)

Federico Hernán Álvarez (born 7 August 1994) is an Argentine professional footballer who plays as a left-back for Tigre.

== Career ==
Álvarez's career started in 2012 with Argentine Primera División side Belgrano. He was an unused substitute four times during the 2012–13 season, prior to making his first-team debut on 2 September 2013 in a win against Atlético de Rafaela. In August 2015, Álvarez appeared in the Copa Sudamericana for the first time in a game versus Lanús. By the end of the 2016 campaign, Álvarez made 49 appearances for Belgrano. In his 2016–17 season opener against Boca Juniors, he received his first career red card. On 31 July 2017, Álvarez was loaned to Quilmes of Primera B Nacional.

== Personal life ==
Álvarez is the nephew of fellow footballer Matías Suárez and cousin of Gastón Álvarez Suárez, another footballer.

== Career statistics ==
As of 11 September 2018.

Club statistics
Club	Season	League			Cup (Note: Includes the Copa Argentina)		League Cup		Continental (Note: Includes the Copa Sudamericana)		Other		Total	
Club	Season	Division	Apps	Goals	Apps	Goals	Apps	Goals	Apps	Goals	Apps	Goals	Apps	Goals
Belgrano	2012–13	Primera División	0	0	0	0	—		—		0	0	0	0
Belgrano	2013–14	Primera División	13	0	0	0	—		0	0	0	0	13	0
Belgrano	2014	Primera División	12	0	0	0	—		—		0	0	12	0
Belgrano	2015	Primera División	17	0	0	0	—		2 (Note: Two appearances in 2015 Copa Sudamericana)	0	0	0	19	0
Belgrano	2016	Primera División	7	0	0	0	—		—		0	0	7	0
Belgrano	2016–17	Primera División	4	0	4	0	—		1 (Note: One appearance in 2016 Copa Sudamericana)	0	0	0	9	0
Belgrano	2017–18	Primera División	0	0	0	0	—		0	0	0	0	0	0
Belgrano	2018–19	Primera División	1	0	0	0	—		—		0	0	1	0
Belgrano	Total		54	0	4	0	—		3	0	0	0	61	0
Quilmes (loan)	2017–18	Primera B Nacional	24	0	0	0	—		—		0	0	24	0
Career total			78	0	4	0	—		3	0	0	0	85	0
