= Mauro Bellone =

Argentine professional footballer

Personal information
- Full name: Mauro Benildo Bellone
- Date of birth: 3 July 1990 (age 36)
- Place of birth: San Cristóbal, Argentina
- Height: 1.81 m (5 ft 11 in)
- Position: Midfielder

Team information
- Current team: Güemes

Youth career
- Colón

Senior career*
Years	Team	Apps	(Gls)
2009–2014	Colón	22	(1)
2011–2012	→ Chacarita Juniors (loan)	9	(0)
2012–2014	→ Instituto (loan)	34	(0)
2014	→ Sportivo Belgrano (loan)	3	(0)
2015	Deportivo Madryn	13	(3)
2015–2018	Flandria	100	(3)
2018–2019	Quilmes	20	(1)
2019–2020	San Martín T.	15	(0)
2020–2021	Enosis Neon Paralimni	25	(0)
2022	San Martín T.	7	(0)
2022–	Güemes	5	(0)
- * Club domestic league appearances and goals as of 15:55, 31 July 2022 (UTC)

Mauro Benildo Bellone (born 3 July 1990) is an Argentine professional footballer who plays as a midfielder for Güemes.

== Career ==
Colón was Bellone's first club. Bellone made two substitute appearances in both the 2008–09 and 2009–10 campaigns, before featuring eighteen times across 2010–11 while also scoring his first goal in November 2010 against Tigre. In June 2011, Bellone was loaned out to Primera B Nacional's Chacarita Juniors. Nine appearances followed as they suffered relegation. Another loan move subsequently occurred in 2012 to Instituto, where he would spend two seasons in the second tier whilst making thirty-four appearances. Further stints with Sportivo Belgrano and Deportivo Madryn then arrived for Bellone.

On 6 July 2015, Bellone joined Flandria in Primera B Metropolitana; having spent the previous five months in Torneo Federal A with Deportivo Madryn. He made his debut during a defeat away to Deportivo Español on 8 July, prior to scoring his opening Flandria goal against Fénix in the succeeding November. His second campaign with Flandria concluded with promotion as champions to Primera B Nacional. He then participated in forty-one fixtures throughout 2016–17, which was followed by twenty-three appearances as they were relegated. Bellone stayed in the division with Quilmes; signing in June 2018.

After scoring once, versus Olimpo, for Quilmes, Bellone headed to San Martín in July 2019. Fifteen appearances followed in one season with the club. In mid-2020, Bellone penned terms on a move to Cyprus with Enosis Neon Paralimni. He made his debut in a 2–0 loss away to Ethnikos Achna, playing seventy-four minutes before being replaced by Illya Markovskyy. Ahead of the 2022 season, Bellone returned to his former club San Martín de Tucumán. In June 2022, Bellone joined Güemes.

== Personal life ==
Bellone's brother, Agustín, is a professional footballer, as is his brother-in-law Lucas Acosta.

== Career statistics ==
As of 27 December 2020.

Appearances and goals by club, season and competition
Club	Season	League			Cup		Continental		Other		Total	
Club	Season	Division	Apps	Goals	Apps	Goals	Apps	Goals	Apps	Goals	Apps	Goals
Colón	2008–09	Primera División	2	0	0	0	—		0	0	2	0
Colón	2009–10	Primera División	2	0	0	0	0	0	0	0	2	0
Colón	2010–11	Primera División	18	1	0	0	—		0	0	18	1
Colón	2011–12	Primera División	0	0	0	0	—		0	0	0	0
Colón	2012–13	Primera División	0	0	0	0	0	0	0	0	0	0
Colón	2013–14	Primera División	0	0	0	0	—		0	0	0	0
Colón	2014	Primera B Nacional	0	0	0	0	—		0	0	0	0
Colón	Total		22	1	0	0	0	0	0	0	22	1
Chacarita Juniors (loan)	2011–12	Primera B Nacional	9	0	0	0	—		2 (Note: Appearance(s) in the Primera B Nacional play-offs)	0	11	0
Instituto (loan)	2012–13	Primera B Nacional	19	0	0	0	—		0	0	19	0
Instituto (loan)	2013–14	Primera B Nacional	15	0	1	0	—		0	0	16	0
Instituto (loan)	Total		34	0	1	0	—		2	0	37	0
Sportivo Belgrano (loan)	2014	Primera B Nacional	3	0	0	0	—		0	0	3	0
Deportivo Madryn	2015	Torneo Federal A	13	3	0	0	—		0	0	13	3
Flandria	2015	Primera B Metropolitana	17	1	0	0	—		0	0	17	1
Flandria	2016	Primera B Metropolitana	19	0	0	0	—		0	0	19	0
Flandria	2016–17	Primera B Nacional	41	1	0	0	—		0	0	41	1
Flandria	2017–18	Primera B Nacional	23	1	0	0	—		0	0	23	1
Flandria	Total		100	3	0	0	—		0	0	100	3
Quilmes	2018–19	Primera B Nacional	20	1	0	0	—		0	0	20	1
San Martín	2019–20	Primera B Nacional	15	0	0	0	—		0	0	15	0
Enosis Neon Paralimni	2020–21	First Division	14	0	1	0	—		0	0	15	0
Career total			230	8	2	0	0	0	2	0	234	8

== Honours ==
Flandria

- Primera B Metropolitana: 2016
