= Iván Juárez =

Argentine footballer

Iván Mauricio Juárez (born 20 October 1976) is an Argentine former professional footballer who played as a midfielder.

In August 2024 he became the manager of Atlético de Rafaela.

== Career ==
- Atlético Rafaela 2001–2002
- Macará 2002
- Atlético Rafaela 2003–2004
- Banfield 2004
- Ferro Carril Oeste 2005
- Atlético Rafaela 2005–2013
- Sportivo Belgrano 2013–2014
- CA Mitre 2014

== Honours ==
Atlético Rafaela

- Primera B Nacional 2003–04, 2010–11
