= Jonás Aguirre =

Argentine footballer (born 1992)

Personal information
- Full name: Leonel Jonás Aguirre Avalo
- Date of birth: 5 March 1992 (age 34)
- Place of birth: Firmat, Argentina
- Height: 1.76 m (5 ft 9 in)
- Position: Midfielder

Team information
- Current team: Gimnasia y Tiro

Youth career
- Rosario Central

Senior career*
Years	Team	Apps	(Gls)
2010–2016	Rosario Central	65	(1)
2017	Necaxa	4	(0)
2017	Puebla	6	(0)
2017–2019	Belgrano	24	(0)
2019–2020	Rosario Central	5	(0)
2020	Mitre	2	(0)
2020–2022	San Martín SJ	32	(1)
2022–2023	Atlético Rafaela	28	(1)
2023–2024	Independiente Rivadavia	23	(2)
2024–2025	Atlético Rafaela	30	(2)
2025–	Gimnasia y Tiro	35	(4)
- * Club domestic league appearances and goals as of 18:09, 28 April 2026 (UTC)

Leonel Jonás Aguirre Avalo (born 5 March 1992) is a professional Argentine footballer who plays for Gimnasia y Tiro.

He was born in Santa Fe and is known for his speed.
