= Juan Larrea (footballer) =

Argentine footballer

Personal information
- Full name: Juan Alberto Larrea
- Date of birth: 15 July 1993 (age 33)
- Place of birth: Lanús, Argentina
- Height: 1.82 m (6 ft 0 in)
- Position: Defensive midfielder

Team information
- Current team: Panthrakikos
- Number: 3

Senior career*
Years	Team	Apps	(Gls)
2012–2016	Ferro Carril Oeste	36	(0)
2014	→ Comunicaciones (loan)	0	(0)
2016–2017	Cañuelas	32	(2)
2017–2019	Quilmes	32	(2)
2019–2020	Apollon Smyrnis	16	(2)
2020–2021	Panachaiki	18	(1)
2021–2022	Anagennisi Karditsa	15	(4)
2022–2023	Panachaiki	23	(2)
2023–	Panthrakikos	0	(0)
- * Club domestic league appearances and goals as of 16 June 2023

Juan Alberto Larrea (born 15 July 1993) is an Argentine professional footballer who plays as a defensive midfielder for Greek Super League 2 club Panthrakikos.

== Career ==
Ferro Carril Oeste were Larrea's first club. After being an unused substitute once during the 2011–12 Primera B Nacional season, Larrea made his debut for the club on 1 September 2012 during a draw away to Independiente Rivadavia. He made fourteen appearances in 2012–13 as they placed seventeenth, prior to featuring five times in 2013–14. In July 2014, Larrea was loaned to Primera B Metropolitana's Comunicaciones. He returned on 31 December, though never made an appearance for Comunicaciones. Larrea then participated in seventeen matches in two campaigns for Ferro, before joining Cañuelas.

Two goals in thirty-two fixtures followed in Primera C Metropolitana for Cañuelas, as they were eliminated from the promotion play-offs by Deportivo Merlo. Primera B Nacional side Quilmes completed the signing of Larrea on 21 July 2017. His first appearance arrived against Sarmiento on 18 September, with his first goal following in February 2018 versus Brown. July 2019 saw Larrea depart for Greece to join Apollon Smyrnis of Super League 2. He made his debut on 29 September versus Ergotelis, which was the first of sixteen appearances; he also scored two goals, against Apollon Pontus and Karaiskakis.

On 24 August 2020, Larrea moved across the Greek second tier to Panachaiki.

== Career statistics ==
As of 18 May 2021.

Appearances and goals by club, season and competition
Club	Season	League			Cup		League Cup		Continental		Other		Total	
Club	Season	Division	Apps	Goals	Apps	Goals	Apps	Goals	Apps	Goals	Apps	Goals	Apps	Goals
Ferro Carril Oeste	2011–12	Primera B Nacional	0	0	0	0	—		—		0	0	0	0
Ferro Carril Oeste	2012–13	Primera B Nacional	14	0	0	0	—		—		0	0	14	0
Ferro Carril Oeste	2013–14	Primera B Nacional	5	0	0	0	—		—		0	0	5	0
Ferro Carril Oeste	2014	Primera B Nacional	0	0	0	0	—		—		0	0	0	0
Ferro Carril Oeste	2015	Primera B Nacional	9	0	0	0	—		—		0	0	9	0
Ferro Carril Oeste	2016	Primera B Nacional	8	0	0	0	—		—		0	0	8	0
Ferro Carril Oeste	Total		36	0	0	0	—		—		0	0	36	0
Comunicaciones (loan)	2014	Primera B Metropolitana	0	0	0	0	—		—		0	0	0	0
Cañuelas	2016–17	Primera C Metropolitana	32	2	1	0	—		—		0	0	33	2
Quilmes	2017–18	Primera B Nacional	19	1	0	0	—		—		0	0	19	1
Quilmes	2018–19	Primera B Nacional	13	1	0	0	—		—		0	0	13	1
Quilmes	Total		32	2	0	0	—		—		0	0	32	2
Apollon Smyrnis	2019–20	Super League 2	16	2	0	0	—		—		0	0	16	2
Panachaiki	2020–21	Super League 2	18	1	0	0	—		—		0	0	18	1
Career total			134	7	1	0	—		—		0	0	135	7
