= Carlos Casares Partido =

Carlos Casares Partido de Carlos Casares
- Department
- Flag Coat of arms

- Location of Carlos Caceres Partido in Buenos Aires Province
- Coordinates: 35°37′S 61°22′W
- Country: Argentina
- Established: January 8, 1907
- Founder: provincial law
- Seat: Carlos Casares

Government
  - Intendant: Daniel Stadnik (PJ)

Area
  - Total: 2,520 km^{2} (970 sq mi)

Population
  - Total: 21,125
  - Density: 8.38/km^{2} (21.7/sq mi)
- Demonym: casarense
- Postal Code: B6530
- IFAM: BUE020
- Area Code: 02395
- Website: www.casares.gov.ar

Carlos Casares Partido is a partido of Buenos Aires Province in Argentina.

The provincial subdivision has a population of about 21,000 inhabitants in an area of 2,520 km^{2} (970 sq mi). Its capital city is Carlos Casares, which is around 257 km (160 mi) from Buenos Aires.

== Settlements ==
- Carlos Casares
- Bellocq, Buenos Aires
- Algarrobos, Buenos Aires
- Cadret
- Centenario
- Arias
- Hortensia, Buenos Aires
- La Dorita
- La Sofía
- Mauricio Hirsch
- Moctezuma, Buenos Aires
- Ordoqui
- Santo Tomás, Buenos Aires
- Smith, Buenos Aires

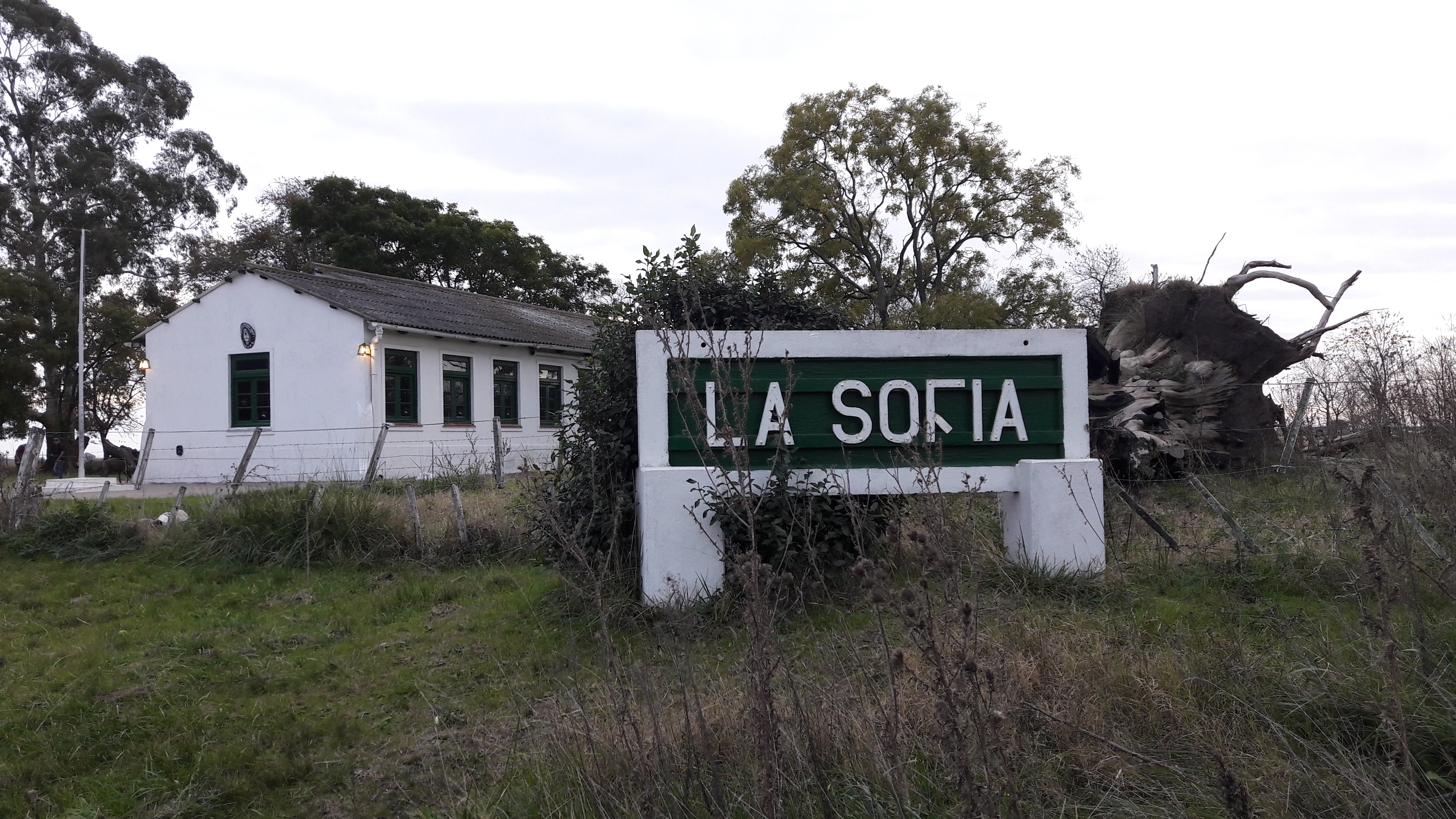
La Sofia, Carlos Casares Partido
