= Marcos Ledesma =

Argentine footballer

Personal information
- Full name: Marcos Ignacio Ledesma
- Date of birth: 15 September 1996 (age 30)
- Place of birth: Río Cuarto, Argentina
- Height: 1.91 m (6 ft 3 in)
- Position: Goalkeeper

Team information
- Current team: Instituto (on loan from Defensa y Justicia)
- Number: 29

Youth career
- Estudiantes
- 2011–2014: Quilmes

Senior career*
Years	Team	Apps	(Gls)
2014–2020	Quilmes	38	(0)
2020–	Defensa y Justicia	8	(0)
2022	→ Platense (loan)	28	(0)
2023	→ Central Córdoba SdE (loan)	18	(0)
2024	→ Gimnasia LP (loan)	18	(0)
2025	→ Barracas Central (loan)	30	(0)
2026–	→ Instituto (loan)	1	(0)
- * Club domestic league appearances and goals as of 17:59, 25 July 2026 (UTC)

Marcos Ignacio Ledesma (born 15 September 1996) is an Argentine professional footballer who plays as a goalkeeper for Instituto, on loan from Defensa y Justicia.

== Career ==
Ledesma joined Quilmes' system in 2011, signing from Estudiantes. He was a first-team player for the 2014, 2015, 2016 and 2016–17 seasons but didn't make an appearance in the Primera División, though was on the substitutes bench seventeen times. He was an unused substitute on a further ten occasions in 2017–18, before his professional debut eventually arrived against Instituto in Primera B Nacional on 2 December 2017. Another appearance versus Juventud Unida came a week later, as the club went on to secure twelfth place. After thirty-eight appearances, Ledesma was signed by Defensa y Justicia on 5 August 2020.

On 3 January 2022, Ledesma joined Platense on a one-year loan with a purchase option.

== Career statistics ==
As of 7 October 2020.

Appearances and goals by club, season and competition
Club	Season	League			Cup		League Cup		Continental		Other		Total	
Club	Season	Division	Apps	Goals	Apps	Goals	Apps	Goals	Apps	Goals	Apps	Goals	Apps	Goals
Quilmes	2014	Primera División	0	0	0	0	—		—		0	0	0	0
Quilmes	2015	Primera División	0	0	0	0	—		—		0	0	0	0
Quilmes	2016	Primera División	0	0	0	0	—		—		0	0	0	0
Quilmes	2016–17	Primera División	0	0	0	0	—		—		0	0	0	0
Quilmes	2017–18	Primera B Nacional	2	0	0	0	—		—		0	0	2	0
Quilmes	2018–19	Primera B Nacional	15	0	0	0	—		—		0	0	15	0
Quilmes	2019–20	Primera B Nacional	21	0	0	0	—		—		0	0	21	0
Quilmes	Total		38	0	0	0	—		—		0	0	38	0
Defensa y Justicia	2020–21	Primera División	0	0	0	0	0	0	0	0	0	0	0	0
Career total			38	0	0	0	0	0	0	0	0	0	38	0
