= Tomás Blanco (footballer) =

Argentine footballer

Personal information
- Date of birth: 17 March 1999 (age 27)
- Place of birth: Chajarí, Argentina
- Height: 1.82 m (6 ft 0 in)
- Position: Forward

Team information
- Current team: Los Andes (on loan from Estudiantes)

Youth career
- 2004–2013: Ferrocarril Chajarí
- 2013–2014: Tiro Federal Chajarí
- 2014–2018: Quilmes

Senior career*
Years	Team	Apps	(Gls)
2018–2019	Quilmes II	0	(0)
2020–2022	Quilmes	67	(9)
2023–	Estudiantes	28	(3)
2024	→ Universidad Central (loan)	8	(2)
2025	→ Anzoátegui (loan)	12	(2)
2026–	→ Los Andes (loan)	2	(0)
- * Club domestic league appearances and goals as of 21:24, 19 March 2026 (UTC)

Tomás Blanco (born 17 March 1999) is an Argentine professional footballer who plays as a forward for Primera Nacional club Los Andes on loan from Estudiantes.

== Career ==
Blanco's career in senior football began with Quilmes, after joining their academy in 2014 following stints with local teams Ferrocarril Chajarí and Tiro Federal Chajarí. He was moved into the first-team by Marcelo Fuentes at the beginning of the 2018–19 Primera B Nacional campaign, making his professional debut against Atlético de Rafaela on 27 August 2018 at the Estadio Nuevo Monumental. His first goal arrived in his fifth appearance in September versus Platense, with his second coming in October during an away draw with Villa Dálmine.

== Career statistics ==
As of 20 March 2019.

Appearances and goals by club, season and competition
Club	Season	League			Cup		Continental		Other		Total	
Club	Season	Division	Apps	Goals	Apps	Goals	Apps	Goals	Apps	Goals	Apps	Goals
Quilmes	2018–19	Primera B Nacional	14	2	0	0	—		0	0	14	2
Career total			14	2	0	0	—		0	0	14	2
