= Alan Alegre =

Argentine footballer

Personal information
- Full name: Alan Jesús Alegre
- Date of birth: 3 February 1990 (age 36)
- Place of birth: Quilmes, Argentina
- Height: 1.82 m (6 ft 0 in)
- Position: Defender

Team information
- Current team: Atlanta

Youth career
- –2013: Quilmes

Senior career*
Years	Team	Apps	(Gls)
2013–2016	Quilmes	68	(2)
2016–2018	Aldosivi	30	(4)
2018–2020	Quilmes	28	(2)
2021–2023	Deportes Temuco	67	(7)
2024–	Atlanta	0	(0)
- * Club domestic league appearances and goals as of 28 December 2023

Alan Jesús Alegre (born 3 February 1990) is an Argentine professional footballer who plays as a defender for Atlanta.

== Career ==
Alegre started with the youth team of Argentine Primera División side Quilmes, he was promoted into the club's first-team in 2013 and made his debut on 8 June against Arsenal de Sarandí in the 2012–13 Argentine Primera División. He made one further appearance in the same season against Godoy Cruz on 18 June. 2013–14 saw Alegre make nineteen appearances for Quilmes, during that time, on 12 October 2013, he scored his first professional career goal versus Belgrano; a first half winner in an away victory. In the next three campaigns, Alegre made forty-seven appearances in the league whilst also receiving his first career red card.

On 1 July 2016, Alegre joined fellow Primera División club Aldosivi. He scored three goals in eighteen league appearances in a season that ended in relegation for Aldosivi. He made his 100th career appearance in March 2018 against Boca Unidos. At the end of the following November, Alegre left Aldosivi to rejoin Quilmes.

He played for Chilean club Deportes Temuco from 2021 to 2023. For the 2024 season, he returned to his homeland and joined Atlanta.

== Career statistics ==
As of 26 December 2018

Club statistics
Club	Season	League			Domestic Cup (Note: Includes the Copa Argentina)		League Cup		Continental		Other		Total	
Club	Season	Division	Apps	Goals	Apps	Goals	Apps	Goals	Apps	Goals	Apps	Goals	Apps	Goals
Quilmes	2012–13	Primera División	2	0	0	0	—		—		0	0	2	0
Quilmes	2013–14	Primera División	19	1	0	0	—		—		0	0	19	1
Quilmes	2014	Primera División	11	1	1	0	—		—		0	0	12	1
Quilmes	2015	Primera División	25	0	3	0	—		—		0	0	28	0
Quilmes	2016	Primera División	11	0	0	0	—		—		0	0	11	0
Quilmes	Total		68	2	4	0	—		—		0	0	72	2
Aldosivi	2016–17	Primera División	18	3	0	0	—		—		0	0	18	3
Aldosivi	2017–18	Primera B Nacional	12	1	0	0	—		—		0	0	12	1
Aldosivi	2018–19	Primera División	0	0	0	0	—		—		0	0	0	0
Aldosivi	Total		30	4	0	0	—		—		0	0	30	4
Quilmes	2018–19	Primera B Nacional	2	0	0	0	—		—		0	0	2	0
Career total			100	6	4	0	—		—		0	0	104	6

== Honours ==
Aldosivi

- Primera B Nacional: 2017–18
