= Camilo Machado =

Colombian footballer (born 1999)

Personal information
- Full name: Camilo Andrés Machado
- Date of birth: 1 February 1999 (age 27)
- Place of birth: Santa Marta, Colombia
- Height: 1.70 m (5 ft 7 in)
- Position: Winger

Team information
- Current team: Deportivo Madryn

Youth career
- Talento Ciudadela
- 2015: All Boys
- 2016–2018: Quilmes

Senior career*
Years	Team	Apps	(Gls)
2018–2026	Quilmes	67	(3)
2020–2021	→ Argentino Quilmes (loan)	17	(7)
2023	→ Defensores de Belgrano (loan)	19	(0)
2024	→ Guillermo Brown (loan)	33	(4)
2026–	Deportivo Madryn	6	(0)
- * Club domestic league appearances and goals as of 16:57, 27 April 2026 (UTC)

Camilo Andrés Machado (born 1 February 1999) is a Colombian professional footballer who plays as a winger for Deportivo Madryn.

== Career ==
Machado's senior career started with Quilmes, having joined the club's academy in 2016 after stints in the systems of Talento Ciudadela in his homeland and in Argentina with All Boys. After going unused on the substitutes bench for Primera B Nacional fixtures with Arsenal de Sarandí and Gimnasia y Esgrima in November 2018, he made his bow in professional football during a draw with Santamarina on 2 December.

== Career statistics ==
As of 23 May 2019.

Appearances and goals by club, season and competition
Club	Season	League			Cup		League Cup		Continental		Other		Total	
Club	Season	Division	Apps	Goals	Apps	Goals	Apps	Goals	Apps	Goals	Apps	Goals	Apps	Goals
Quilmes	2018–19	Primera B Nacional	1	0	0	0	—		—		0	0	1	0
Career total			1	0	0	0	—		—		0	0	1	0
