= Esteban Glellel =

Syrian footballer (born 1999)

Esteban Glellel إستيبان جليل
Personal information
- Full name: Esteban Alejandro Glellel
- Date of birth: 6 January 1999 (age 27)
- Place of birth: Río Cuarto, Argentina
- Height: 1.85 m (6 ft 1 in)
- Position: Goalkeeper

Team information
- Current team: Quilmes
- Number: 1

Youth career
- Quilmes

Senior career*
Years	Team	Apps	(Gls)
2020–	Quilmes	98	(0)
2022	→ Deportivo Armenio (loan)		

International career^{‡}
2024–	Syria	4	(0)
- * Club domestic league appearances and goals as of 17:23, 18 April 2026 (UTC) ‡ National team caps and goals as of 14 October 2024

Esteban Alejandro Glellel (Arabic: استيبان اليخاندرو جليل; born 6 January 1999) is a footballer who plays as a goalkeeper for Primera Nacional club Quilmes. Born in Argentina, he represents the Syria national team.

== International career ==
Glellel made his debut for the Syria national team on 11 June 2024 in a World Cup qualifier against Japan at Edion Peace Wing Hiroshima. He played the full game as Japan won 5–0.
