= Brandon Obregón =

Argentine footballer (born 1996)

Personal information
- Full name: Brandon Nicolás Obregón
- Date of birth: 23 May 1996 (age 30)
- Place of birth: Solano, Argentina
- Height: 1.70 m (5 ft 7 in)
- Position: Midfielder

Team information
- Current team: Quilmes

Youth career
- Independiente
- 2016–2017: Quilmes

Senior career*
Years	Team	Apps	(Gls)
2017–2022	Quilmes	65	(4)
2022	→ Sacachispas (loan)	22	(1)
2023	Brown Adrogué	12	(0)
2024–	Chaco For Ever	29	(0)
- * Club domestic league appearances and goals as of 17:13, 22 July 2025 (UTC)

Brandon Nicolás Obregón (born 23 May 1996) is an Argentine professional footballer who plays as a midfielder for Chaco For Ever.

== Career ==
Obregón's senior career began with Quilmes, having joined from Independiente in 2016. He made his debut in the Primera División on 25 March 2017 at the Estadio Pedro Bidegain against San Lorenzo, which preceded a further eight appearances arriving in the 2016–17 season as Quilmes were relegated to Primera B Nacional. After playing a total of nine times in 2016–17, he featured in the same amount of fixtures in 2017–18 as they missed the promotion play-offs by three points.

== Career statistics ==
As of 24 March 2019.

Appearances and goals by club, season and competition
Club	Season	League			Cup		Continental		Other		Total	
Club	Season	Division	Apps	Goals	Apps	Goals	Apps	Goals	Apps	Goals	Apps	Goals
Quilmes	2016–17	Primera División	9	0	0	0	—		0	0	9	0
Quilmes	2017–18	Primera B Nacional	9	0	0	0	—		0	0	9	0
Quilmes	2018–19	Primera B Nacional	9	0	0	0	—		0	0	9	0
Career total			27	0	0	0	—		0	0	27	0
