= Damián Tello =

Argentine footballer

Personal information
- Full name: Damián Ezequiel Tello Cabrera
- Date of birth: 23 September 1995 (age 31)
- Place of birth: Mendoza, Argentina
- Height: 1.90 m (6 ft 3 in)
- Position: Goalkeeper

Youth career
- Leonardo Murialdo
- Gimnasia de Mendoza

Senior career*
Years	Team	Apps	(Gls)
2014	Gimnasia de Mendoza		
2015	Real Cartagena		
2016	Deportivo JBL		
2016	Leonardo Murialdo		
2017	Huracán Las Heras		
2018–2019	Deportivo Maipú	30	(0)
2019–2020	Defensores Unidos	2	(0)
2021	Atlanta	6	(0)
2022	Chacarita Juniors	0	(0)
2022	Alvarado	0	(0)
2023–2025	Talleres RdE	107	(0)
2026	Curicó Unido	26	(0)
- * Club domestic league appearances and goals as of 2 November 2026

Damián Ezequiel Tello Cabrera (born 23 September 1995) is an Argentine professional footballer who plays as a goalkeeper.

== Career ==
Born in Mendoza, Argentina, Tello started his career with Gimnasia y Esgrima de Mendoza before moving abroad to play in Colombia and Venezuela for Real Cartagena and Deportivo JBL, respectively. As a member of Gimnasia, he won the 2013–14 Torneo Argentino B.

Back in Argentina, Tello spent seasons with Leonardo Murialdo, Huracán Las Heras and Deportivo Maipú in Mendoza Province.

The next years, Tello spent seasons with Defensores Unidos, Atlanta, Chacarita Juniors and Alvarado before joining Talleres de Remedios de Escalada in 2023 until 2025. With Talleres, he won the 2023 Primera B Metropolitana and reached over a thousand minutes without conceding goals during 2024.

For the 2026 season, Tello moved abroad again and joined Chilean club Curicó Unido.

== Personal life ==
He is the older brother of the also goalkeeper Alejo Tello.
