= Juan Orellana =

Argentine footballer

Personal information
- Date of birth: 1 May 1997 (age 29)
- Place of birth: Burruyacú, Argentina
- Height: 1.93 m (6 ft 4 in)
- Position: Centre-back

Team information
- Current team: Ferro Carril Oeste (on loan from San Martín T.)

Youth career
- 2017–2019: San Martín T.

Senior career*
Years	Team	Apps	(Gls)
2019–	San Martín T.	102	(3)
2026–	→ Ferro Carril Oeste (loan)	4	(0)
- * Club domestic league appearances and goals as of 17:08, 11 April 2026 (UTC)

Juan Orellana (born 1 May 1997) is an Argentine professional footballer who plays as a defender for Ferro Carril Oeste.

== Career ==
Orellana began in the ranks of San Martín, signing for their academy in early 2017. He was promoted into their senior side during the 2018–19 Primera División campaign, though made his senior bow in the Copa Argentina on 6 March 2019 during a penalty shoot-out victory over Agropecuario of Primera B Nacional. He went on to make three league appearances in 2018–19, as they suffered relegation.

== Personal life ==
In August 2020, it was confirmed that Orellana had tested positive for COVID-19 amid the pandemic; he was asymptomatic.

== Career statistics ==
As of 23 September 2020.

Appearances and goals by club, season and competition
Club	Season	League			Cup		League Cup		Continental		Other		Total	
Club	Season	Division	Apps	Goals	Apps	Goals	Apps	Goals	Apps	Goals	Apps	Goals	Apps	Goals
San Martín	2018–19	Primera División	3	0	1	0	2	0	—		0	0	6	0
San Martín	2019–20	Primera B Nacional	0	0	0	0	—		—		0	0	0	0
Career total			3	0	1	0	2	0	—		0	0	6	0
