= Diego Nakache =

Argentine professional footballer

Personal information
- Date of birth: 23 February 1996 (age 30)
- Place of birth: Barkojba, Argentina
- Height: 1.70 m (5 ft 7 in)
- Position: Forward

Team information
- Current team: Talleres (RE)

Senior career*
Years	Team	Apps	(Gls)
2017–2019	Atlanta	14	(0)
2019–2021	Comunicaciones	20	(3)
2022	Deportivo Armenio		
2023	Sarmiento	12	(2)
2023–2024	Gimnasia y Esgrima (J)	15	(2)
2024–	Talleres (RE)	25	(1)
- * Club domestic league appearances and goals as of 1 June 2025

Diego Nakache (born 23 February 1996) is an Argentine professional footballer who plays as a forward for Atlanta.

== Career ==
Nakache's career started with Atlanta. He appeared for his professional debut on 17 April 2017 in Primera B Metropolitana, replacing Nicolás Previtali after eighty minutes of a home defeat to UAI Urquiza; his first start arrived five days later against Barracas Central. During a Copa Argentina encounter with Primera División side San Martín in June 2017, Nakache scored the first two goals of his senior career in a 0–3 win. In total, he made sixteen appearances across the 2016–17 and 2017–18 seasons. Nakache spent 2019–20 out on loan with Comunicaciones, scoring three goals across a total of twenty matches.

== Career statistics ==
As of 10 July 2020.

Appearances and goals by club, season and competition
Club	Season	League			Cup		League Cup		Continental		Other		Total	
Club	Season	Division	Apps	Goals	Apps	Goals	Apps	Goals	Apps	Goals	Apps	Goals	Apps	Goals
Atlanta	2016–17	Primera B Metropolitana	6	0	1	2	—		—		0	0	7	2
Atlanta	2017–18	Primera B Metropolitana	8	0	0	0	—		—		0	0	8	0
Atlanta	2018–19	Primera B Metropolitana	1	0	1	0	—		—		0	0	2	0
Atlanta	2019–20	Primera B Metropolitana	0	0	0	0	—		—		0	0	0	0
Atlanta	Total		15	0	2	2	—		—		0	0	17	2
Comunicaciones (loan)	2019–20	Primera B Metropolitana	20	3	0	0	—		—		0	0	20	3
Career total			35	3	2	2	—		—		0	0	37	5
