= Alejandro Altuna =

Argentine footballer

Personal information
- Full name: Alejandro Altuna
- Date of birth: 19 January 1992 (age 34)
- Place of birth: Laborde, Argentina
- Height: 1.82 m (5 ft 11 1/2 in)
- Position: Midfielder

Team information
- Current team: Sport Boys
- Number: 19

Youth career
- Belgrano

Senior career*
Years	Team	Apps	(Gls)
2014	Sportivo Patria	2	(0)
2015	Deportivo Madryn	21	(0)
2016–2017	Flandria	57	(1)
2017–2019	San Martín T.	21	(0)
2019–2020	Quilmes	13	(0)
2020–2021	Nueva Chicago	9	(0)
2021–2022	Este	23	(1)
2022–2023	Flandria	37	(1)
2024–	Cumbayá	18	(0)
- * Club domestic league appearances and goals as of 30 November 2024

Alejandro Altuna (born 19 January 1992) is an Argentine professional footballer who plays as a midfielder for Sport Boys.

== Career ==
Altuna joined Sportivo Patria following a spell with Belgrano. He scored one goal in eight games during the 2014 Torneo Federal A, which preceded his departure in January 2015 to Deportivo Madryn. His debut against Ferro Carril Oeste on 22 March 2015 was the first of twenty-six appearances for the club. Altuna was on the move again after agreeing to join Flandria of Primera B Metropolitana in 2016. They were promoted in his first season, in which he featured nineteen times whilst netting once. On 11 August 2017, Altuna joined fellow Primera B Nacional team San Martín; who also won promotion in his opening campaign.

Altuna was released by Quilmes in June 2020.

== Career statistics ==
As of 24 May 2025.

Club statistics
Club	Division	League			Cup		Continental		Total	
Club	Division	Season	Apps	Goals	Apps	Goals	Apps	Goals	Apps	Goals
Sportivo Patria	Torneo Federal A	2014	8	1	1	0	—		9	1
Deportivo Madryn	Torneo Federal A	2015	26	0	—		—		26	0
Flandria	Primera B Metropolitana	2016	19	1	—		—		19	1
Flandria	Primera B Nacional	2016–17	38	0	—		—		38	0
San Martín T.	Primera B Nacional	2017–18	14	0	—		—		14	0
San Martín T.	Primera División	2018–19	7	0	2	0	—		9	0
San Martín T.	Total		21	0	2	0	0	0	23	0
Quilmes	Primera B Nacional	2019–20	13	0	—		—		13	0
Nueva Chicago	Primera B Nacional	2020	6	0	—		—		6	0
Nueva Chicago	Primera B Nacional	2021	3	0	—		—		3	0
Nueva Chicago	Total		9	0	0	0	0	0	9	0
Este	Serie D	2021–22	23	1	1	0	—		24	1
Flandria	Primera B Nacional	2022	8	1	—		—		8	1
Flandria	Primera B Nacional	2023	28	0	—		—		28	0
Flandria	Total		93	2	0	0	0	0	93	2
Cumbayá	Serie A	2024	18	0	1	0	—		19	0
Sport Boys	Liga 1	2025	10	0	0	0	—		10	0
Career total			221	4	5	0	0	0	226	4

== Honours ==
Flandria

- Primera B Metropolitana: 2016
