= David Drocco =

Argentine footballer (born 1989)

Personal information
- Full name: David Hernán Drocco
- Date of birth: 20 January 1989 (age 37)
- Place of birth: Córdoba, Argentina
- Height: 1.68 m (5 ft 6 in)
- Position: Midfielder

Youth career
- 2005–2007: Boca Juniors

Senior career*
Years	Team	Apps	(Gls)
2008–2012	Boca Juniors	3	(0)
2009–2010	→ Atlético Tucumán (loan)	15	(0)
2011	→ San Martín SJ (loan)	9	(0)
2011–2012	→ Desamparados (loan)	33	(5)
2012–2017	Audax Italiano	120	(5)
2012–2013	Audax Italiano B	8	(2)
2017–2018	Arsenal de Sarandí	22	(0)
2018–2019	Huracán	1	(0)
2019–2022	Quilmes	58	(1)
2023	Moralo	1	(0)
- * Club domestic league appearances and goals

David Hernán Drocco (Spanish pronunciation: [daˈβið eɾˈnan ˈdɾoko], born 20 January 1989) is an Argentine former professional footballer who played as a midfielder.

== Teams ==
- (Argentina) Boca Juniors 2008–2012
- (Argentina) Atlético Tucumán (loan) 2009–2010
- (Argentina) San Martín de San Juan (loan) 2011
- (Argentina) Desamparados (loan) 2011–2012
- (Chile) Audax Italiano 2012–2017
- (Argentina) Arsenal de Sarandí 2017–2018
- (Argentina) Huracán 2018–2019
- (Argentina) Quilmes 2019–2022
- (Spain) Moralo 2023

== Personal life ==
Following his retirement, Drocco switched to padel and has competed in tournaments alongside former professional footballers such as Valentín Viola, Roberto Acuña, Renato Civelli, among others.
