= Augusto Max =

Argentine footballer

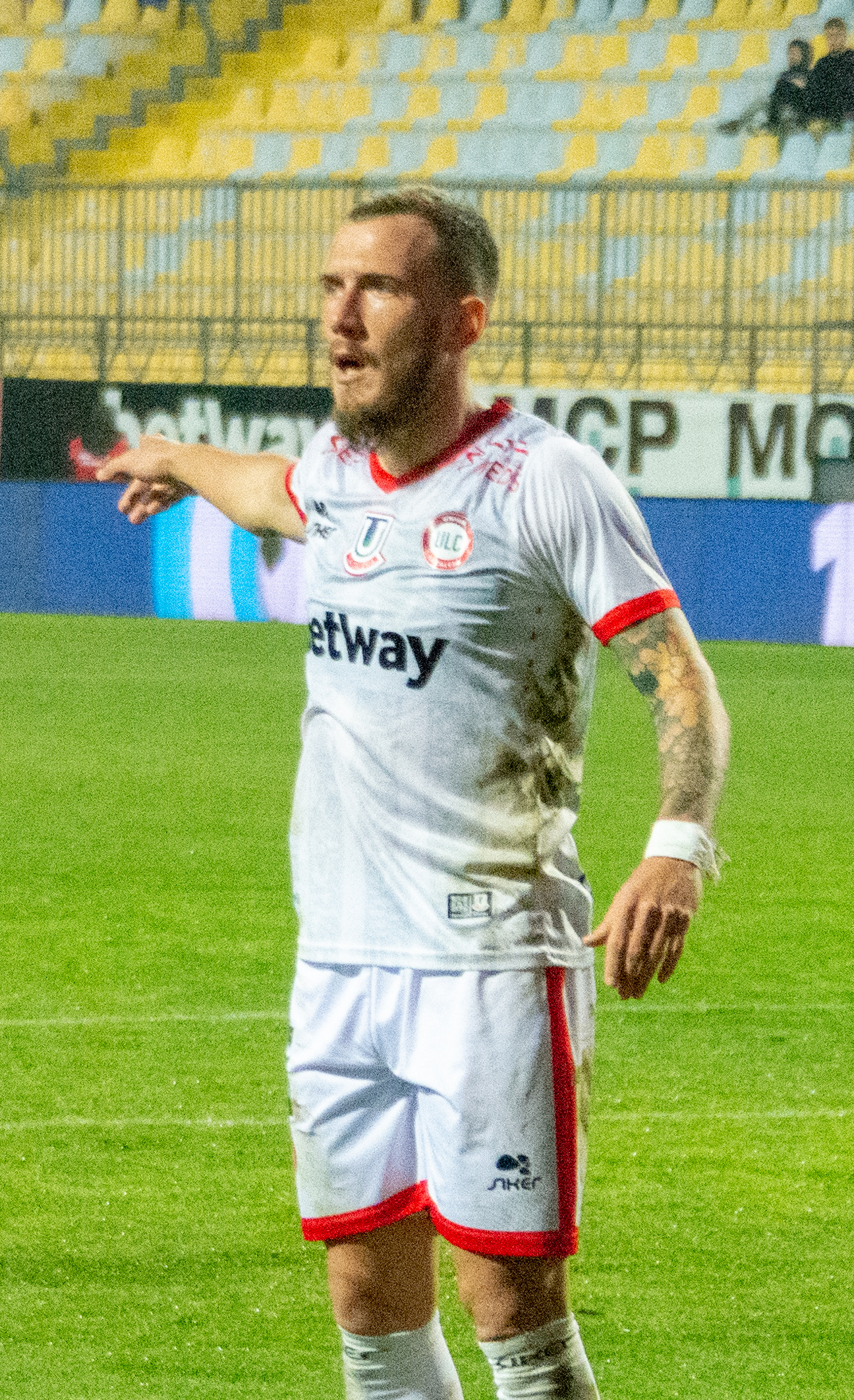
- Max with Unión La Calera in 2023

Personal information
- Date of birth: 10 August 1992 (age 34)
- Place of birth: San Miguel de Tucumán, Argentina
- Height: 1.68 m (5 ft 6 in)
- Position: Defensive midfielder

Team information
- Current team: Gimnasia LP
- Number: 16

Youth career
- Newell's Old Boys
- San Martín

Senior career*
Years	Team	Apps	(Gls)
2008–2014	San Martín	34	(0)
2014	Atlético Tucumán	1	(0)
2015	Mitre	21	(0)
2016–2017	Juventud Unida	39	(1)
2017–2019	Quilmes	43	(1)
2019–2020	Volos	24	(0)
2020–2021	Diósgyőr	26	(0)
2020–2021	→ Diósgyőr II	1	(0)
2021–2023	Cerro Largo	51	(4)
2023	Unión La Calera	15	(0)
2024	Železničar Pančevo	7	(0)
2024–	Gimnasia LP	45	(0)
- * Club domestic league appearances and goals as of 17:19, 9 July 2026 (UTC)

Augusto Max (born 10 August 1992) is an Argentine professional footballer who plays as a defensive midfielder for Gimnasia LP.

== Career ==
Max began with Newell's Old Boys, before signing with San Martín. He was a senior member from 2008, though made his first two appearances across 2009–10 and 2010–11 against Sportivo Italiano and Tiro Federal as the club suffered relegation. No appearances followed in 2011–12, though he did play forty-two times in Torneo Argentino A across the next two seasons. Atlético Tucumán of Primera B Nacional signed Max in 2014. He made his bow versus Independiente Rivadavia on 24 October; his only match. A move back to tier three came with Mitre in 2015, which preceded tier two's Juventud Unida signing Max.

Ahead of the 2017–18 season, Max joined Primera B Nacional side Quilmes. His first appearance came on 18 September against Sarmiento, as he went on to participate in nineteen fixtures to finish twelfth. Max was demoted to Quilmes' reserves on 8 May 2019, before agreeing terms with newly promoted Super League Greece side Volos a day later; penning a two-year contract, subject to the passing of a medical - which he later passed. He appeared twenty-eight times in one season with the club. On 18 August 2020, Max moved to Hungary with Diósgyőri.

After a season in Hungary, he returned to Argentina joining Cerro Largo F.C. where he would play two seasons. Then, in 2023, he joined Unión La Calera where he played until the end of the year. During the winter break of 2023–24, he surprisingly returned to Europe, this time to play for the Serbian SuperLiga side FK Železničar Pančevo.

In September 2024, Max returned to Argentina to join Gimnasia LP, signing an 18-month contract.

== Career statistics ==
As of 15 May 2020.

Appearances and goals by club, season and competition
Club	Season	League			Cup		League Cup		Continental		Other		Total	
Club	Season	Division	Apps	Goals	Apps	Goals	Apps	Goals	Apps	Goals	Apps	Goals	Apps	Goals
San Martín	2009–10	Primera B Nacional	1	0	0	0	—		—		0	0	1	0
San Martín	2010–11	Primera B Nacional	1	0	0	0	—		—		0	0	1	0
San Martín	2011–12	Torneo Argentino A	0	0	0	0	—		—		0	0	0	0
San Martín	2012–13	Torneo Argentino A	9	0	0	0	—		—		6 (Note: Appearance(s) in the Torneo Argentino A play-offs)	0	15	0
San Martín	2013–14	Torneo Argentino A	23	0	1	0	—		—		4	0	28	0
San Martín	Total		34	0	1	0	—		—		10	0	45	0
Atlético Tucumán	2014	Primera B Nacional	1	0	0	0	—		—		0	0	1	0
Mitre	2015	Torneo Federal A	21	0	0	0	—		—		2 (Note: Appearance(s) in the Torneo Federal A play-offs)	0	23	0
Juventud Unida	2016	Primera B Nacional	8	0	0	0	—		—		0	0	8	0
Juventud Unida	2016–17	Primera B Nacional	31	1	0	0	—		—		0	0	31	1
Juventud Unida	Total		39	1	0	0	—		—		0	0	39	1
Quilmes	2017–18	Primera B Nacional	19	0	0	0	—		—		0	0	19	0
Quilmes	2018–19	Primera B Nacional	24	1	0	0	—		—		0	0	24	1
Quilmes	Total		43	1	0	0	—		—		0	0	43	1
Volos	2019–20	Super League Greece	24	0	4	0	—		—		0	0	28	0
Diósgyőri	2020–21	Nemzeti Bajnokság I	26	0	2	0	—		—		0	0	28	0
Diósgyőri II	2020–21	Nemzeti Bajnokság III	1	0	—		—		—		0	0	1	0
Career total			189	2	7	0	—		—		12	0	208	2
