= José Luis Valdez =

Argentine footballer

Personal information
- Full name: José Luis Valdez
- Date of birth: 14 April 1998 (age 28)
- Place of birth: Ascensión, Buenos Aires, Argentina
- Height: 1.74 m (5 ft 9 in)
- Position: Forward

Youth career
- 2010–2016: Quilmes

Senior career*
Years	Team	Apps	(Gls)
2016–2021	Quilmes	15	(0)
2020	→ Talleres (loan)	9	(2)

International career
2014	Argentina U17	3	(1)
- * Club domestic league appearances and goals

José Luis Valdez (born 14 April 1998) is an Argentine former footballer.

== Club career ==
Valdez made his senior debut in a 0–3 loss to Newell's Old Boys on August 28, 2016, replacing Enzo Acosta for the final 15 minutes. Shortly after, he signed his first professional contract with the Greater Buenos Aires-based club.

== Career statistics ==
=== Club ===
Club	Season	League			Cup		Continental		Other		Total	
Club	Season	Division	Apps	Goals	Apps	Goals	Apps	Goals	Apps	Goals	Apps	Goals
Quilmes	2016–17	Argentine Primera División	4	0	0	0	–		0	0	4	0
Quilmes	2017–18	Primera B Nacional	0	0	0	0	–		0	0	0	0
Quilmes	2018–19	Primera B Nacional	8	0	0	0	–		0	0	8	0
Quilmes	2019–20	Primera B Nacional	3	0	0	0	–		0	0	3	0
Quilmes	2020	Primera Nacional	0	0	0	0	–		0	0	0	0
Quilmes	Total		15	0	0	0	0	0	0	0	15	0
Talleres (loan)	2019–20	Primera B Metropolitana	9	2	1 (Note: Appearances in the Copa Argentina)	0	–		0	0	10	2
Career total			24	2	1	0	0	0	0	0	25	2
