= Abel Masuero =

Argentine footballer (born 1988)

Personal information
- Full name: Abel Luis Masuero
- Date of birth: 6 April 1988 (age 38)
- Place of birth: Ramona, Santa Fe, Argentina
- Height: 1.85 m (6 ft 1 in)
- Position: Centre-back

Team information
- Current team: Talleres RdE

Youth career
- Talleres

Senior career*
Years	Team	Apps	(Gls)
2007–2011	Gimnasia LP	33	(0)
2009–2010	→ Ferro Carril Oeste (loan)	35	(1)
2011–2013	Genk	1	(0)
2012–2013	→ San Lorenzo (loan)	12	(0)
2013–2015	Instituto	40	(1)
2015	Nueva Chicago	28	(0)
2016–2017	Patronato	32	(1)
2017–2018	Brown de Adrogué	26	(0)
2018–2019	Atlético Rafaela	11	(0)
2019–2020	Quilmes	21	(2)
2020–2021	Ierapetra	22	(0)
2021	Atsalenios		
2022	Chacarita Juniors	32	(3)
2023	San Martín de San Juan	32	(4)
2024	Brown de Adrogué	36	(2)
2025	Sportivo Estudiantes	4	(1)
2025–	Talleres RdE	12	(1)
- * Club domestic league appearances and goals as of 18:36, 16 April 2026 (UTC)

Abel Luis Masuero (born 6 April 1988) is an Argentine professional footballer who plays as a centre-back for Talleres RdE.

== Career ==
Masuero began his professional playing career in 2007 with Gimnasia y Esgrima de La Plata. He made his professional debut on 18 February 2007 in a 2–2 draw with Quilmes.
