= Emanuel Bilbao =

Argentine footballer (born 1989)

Personal information
- Date of birth: 3 November 1989 (age 37)
- Place of birth: Coronel Pringles, Argentina
- Height: 1.89 m (6 ft 2 in)
- Position: Goalkeeper

Team information
- Current team: Atlético Rafaela (on loan from Instituto)

Youth career
- Almaceneros
- 2004–2008: Olimpo

Senior career*
Years	Team	Apps	(Gls)
2008–2014	Olimpo	0	(0)
2010	→ Independiente (loan)		
2012	→ Independiente (loan)		
2015–2018	Guillermo Brown	27	(0)
2018–2019	Quilmes	9	(0)
2019–2020	Alvarado	12	(0)
2020–2021	Huracán Las Heras	7	(0)
2021	Villa Dálmine	34	(0)
2022–	Instituto	0	(0)
2024–	→ Atlético de Rafaela (loan)	26	(0)
- * Club domestic league appearances and goals as of 16:48, 6 June 2025 (UTC)

Emanuel Bilbao (born 3 November 1989) is an Argentine professional footballer who plays as a goalkeeper for Atlético Rafaela, on loan from Instituto.

== Club career ==
After a stint with Almaceneros, Bilbao joined Olimpo. Despite being a first-team member between 2008 and 2014, he didn't make a senior appearance for the club across seasons in the Primera División and Primera B Nacional. During his time with Olimpo, Bilbao had separate loan spells with Liga de Fútbol de Río Colorado outfit Independiente. On 11 February 2015, Bilbao joined Guillermo Brown of Primera B Nacional. He was an unused substitute forty-one times in 2015, before making his professional bow in April 2016 against Instituto. A further twenty-eight appearances in all competitions followed across the next three campaigns.

In June 2018, fellow second tier team Quilmes signed Bilbao. His debut arrived on 27 August against Atlético de Rafaela.

== International career ==
Bilbao received a call-up from Sergio Batista to train with the Argentina U20s in 2008.

== Career statistics ==
As of 15 March 2019.

Appearances and goals by club, season and competition
Club	Season	League			Cup		Continental		Other		Total	
Club	Season	Division	Apps	Goals	Apps	Goals	Apps	Goals	Apps	Goals	Apps	Goals
Olimpo	2008–09	Primera B Nacional	0	0	0	0	—		0	0	0	0
Olimpo	2009–10	Primera B Nacional	0	0	0	0	—		0	0	0	0
Olimpo	2010–11	Primera División	0	0	0	0	—		0	0	0	0
Olimpo	2011–12	Primera División	0	0	0	0	—		0	0	0	0
Olimpo	2012–13	Primera B Nacional	0	0	0	0	—		0	0	0	0
Olimpo	2013–14	Primera División	0	0	0	0	—		0	0	0	0
Olimpo	2014	Primera División	0	0	0	0	—		0	0	0	0
Olimpo	Total		0	0	0	0	—		0	0	0	0
Guillermo Brown	2015	Primera B Nacional	0	0	0	0	—		0	0	0	0
Guillermo Brown	2016	Primera B Nacional	11	0	0	0	—		0	0	11	0
Guillermo Brown	2016–17	Primera B Nacional	4	0	0	0	—		0	0	4	0
Guillermo Brown	2017–18	Primera B Nacional	12	0	2	0	—		0	0	14	0
Guillermo Brown	Total		27	0	2	0	—		0	0	29	0
Quilmes	2018–19	Primera B Nacional	9	0	0	0	—		0	0	9	0
Career total			36	0	2	0	—		0	0	38	0
