= Carlos Casares, Buenos Aires =

Carlos Casares
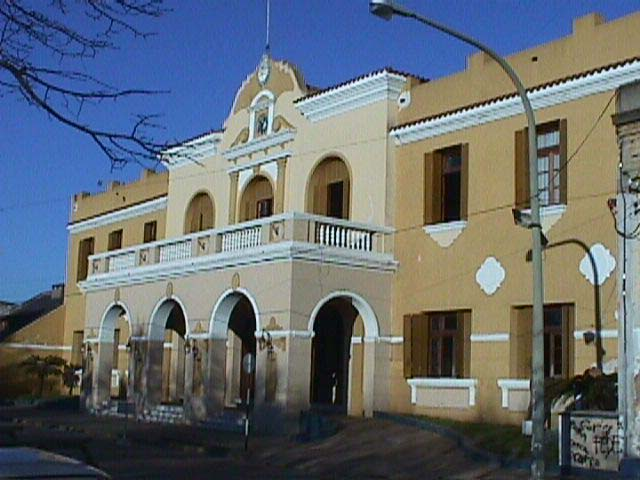
- City Hall

- Flag Coat of arms
- Interactive map of Carlos Casares
- Coordinates: 35°37′S 61°22′W
- Country: Argentina
- Province: Buenos Aires
- Partido: Carlos Casares
- Founded: 8 January 1907

Population (2001 census [INDEC])
  - Total: 21,125
- CPA Base: B 6530
- Area code: +54 2395
- Website: www.casares.gov.ar

Carlos Casares (often referred to as Casares) is a town in Buenos Aires Province, Argentina. It is the head town of the Carlos Casares Partido.

== History ==
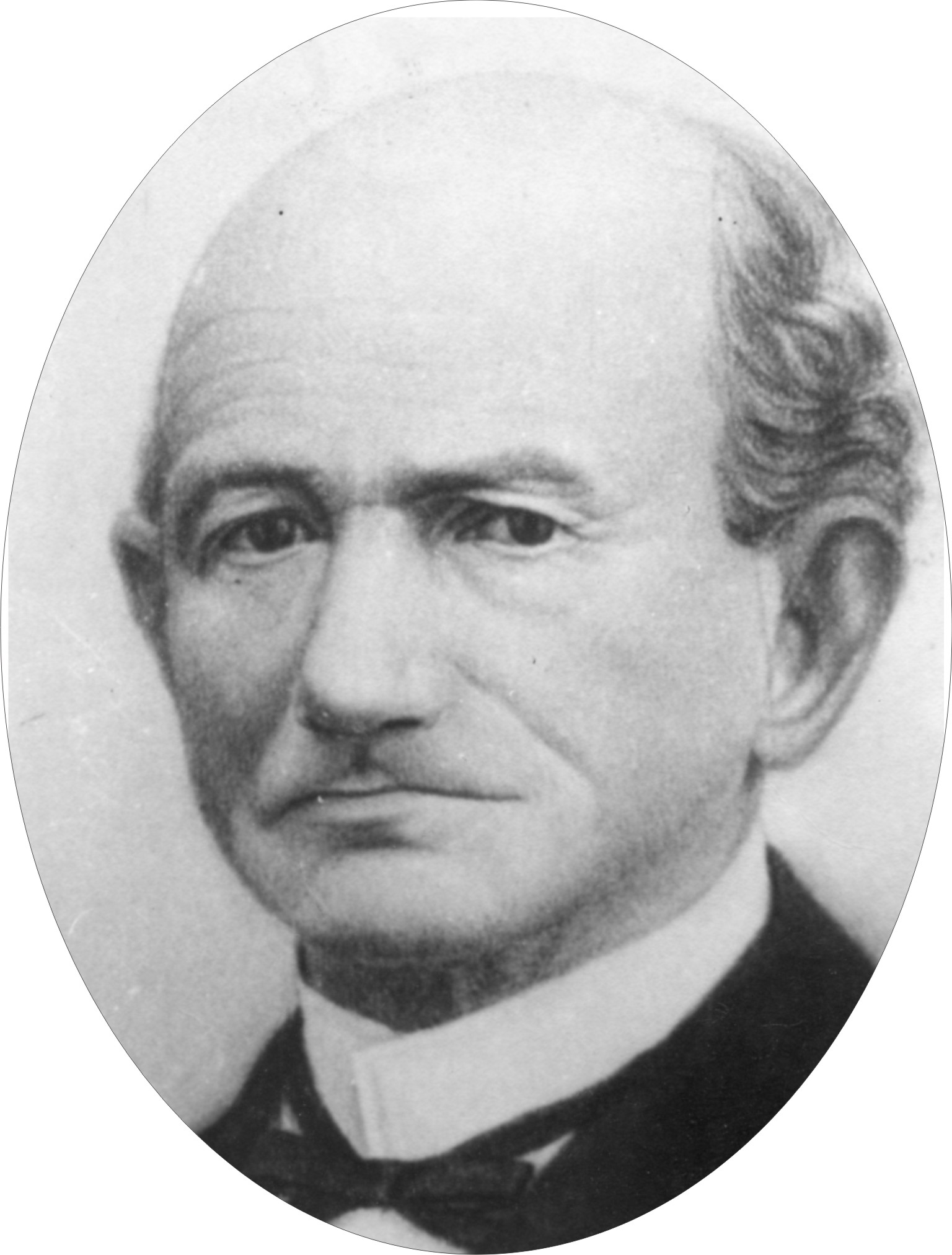
Antonio Maya, founder

The settlement gradually developed around a station on the Buenos Aires Western Railway, opened in 1889. The station was named after Carlos Casares, Governor of Buenos Aires between 1875 and 1878. The town and partido were founded on 8 January 1907, from territory taken from Nueve de Julio Partido and Pehuajó Partido.

Leading local institutions include the Verdi Theatre (maintained by the Italian Society), the Bristol Theatre (maintained by the Hebrew Society), the Church of Our Lady of Carmen (1941), the José Ingenieros Cultural Center and Library, and El Bagual Traditionalist Center.

== Economy ==
Carlos Casares figures prominently in Argentine agriculture. A leading center of sunflower seed cultivation, as well as of maize, sorghum, soy, and wheat, the city's largest employer is the Grobocopatel Brothers Company, a major Argentine exporter. The National Sunflower Festival (Fiesta Nacional del Girasol), first organized in 1963, is held in Carlos Casares every November.

The town also attracts tourism as the center of the Trail of Forts (Huella de Fortínes), historically known as the "Western Frontier of Buenos Aires Province." The 100-km (62-mi) horse trail begins at Fort Paz, and includes guided tours of the remains of forts built during the 1870s to ward off indigenous raids.
