= 2019–20 Defensores de Belgrano season =

Defensores de Belgrano
2019–20 season
- President: Marcelo Achile
- Manager: Fabián Nardozza
- Stadium: Estadio Juan Pasquale
- Top goalscorer: League: Matías Quiroga; Ezequiel Aguirre; All: Matías Quiroga; Ezequiel Aguirre

The 2019–20 season is Defensores de Belgrano's 2nd consecutive season in the second division of Argentine football, Primera B Nacional.

The season generally covers the period from 1 July 2019 to 30 June 2020.

== Review ==
=== Pre-season ===
Defensores de Belgrano announced their first signing of 2019–20 early in May 2019, as Sebastián Soto penned terms from Deportivo Riestra. Kevin Dubini's exit to Justo José de Urquiza was confirmed on 6 June, while the club unveiled a double signing from Brown on 7 June with Nicolás Benegas and Marcelo Lamas joining. Across the succeeding six days, El Dragón had an incoming and an outgoing in Elvio Gelmini (from Guillermo Brown) and Francisco Martínez (to Tristán Suárez). Pablo Miranda signed from Sportivo Desamparados on 15 June, which preceded the arrivals of Matías Quiroga and Leonel Müller on 19-20 June. Christian Moreno left the Núñez outfit on 22 June, agreeing a move to Acassuso. Juan Manuel Olivares, a third player from Brown, joined on 26 June.

A ninth new signing was completed on 28 June as Sebastián Giovini made the trip from Guillermo Brown. Defensores de Belgrano lost in back-to-back friendlies with top-flight Defensa y Justicia on 29 June, suffering 2–0 and 1–0 defeats. Numerous loans from the previous campaign officially expired on and around 30 June. Nahuel Peralta went away on 4 July, sealing a return to former team Deportivo Armenio. The acquisitions of Nicolás Álvarez and Guillermo Vernetti were fulfilled on 5 July. Defensores beat a team of free agents in Centro Integral del Futbolista Argentino in two matches on 17 July. On the same day, Tristán Suárez captured goalkeeper Cristian Correa from Defensores. Maximiliano Núñez came to Defensores from Atlético Bucaramanga on 19 July.

Martín García, a goalkeeper from Argentino of Primera C Metropolitana, sealed his arrival on 19 July. Defensores travelled to face the Vélez Sarsfield Reserves in Ituzaingó on 20 July, where a 2–1 victory would be followed by a goalless draw. Defensores shared wins with Acassuso in pre-season matches on 25 July, with Nicolás Benegas scoring twice in their victory. They did likewise on 2 August versus Ferro Carril Oeste, with fellow new signing Maximiliano Núñez netting for them on that occasion. 10 August saw Defensores head to Huracán for a friendly, losing by a single goal at the Campo de Deportes Jorge Newbery in Buenos Aires. Federico Marín arrived on loan from Huracán on 15 August. Their last friendly, versus Fénix, was postponed due to poor weather.

=== August ===
A visit to Gimnasia y Esgrima (M)'s Estadio Víctor Antonio Legrotaglie ended in a goalless draw on 18 August in Defensores' first Primera B Nacional encounter of the new campaign. Three days after, Defensores faced top division Lanús in a friendly and drew 1–1. Gonzalo Mottes, from Gimnasia y Esgrima (LP), and Leandro Rodríguez, from All Boys, were announced as new players on 21 August. Defensores lost 1–0 away to Quilmes on 26 August. Defensores tied 2–2 at home to Atlético de Rafaela on 31 August.

== Squad ==
Squad No.	Nationality	Name	Position(s)	Date of Birth (age)	Signed from
Goalkeepers
	Argentina	Martín García	GK	9 March 1995 (age 31)	Argentino
	Argentina	Sebastián Giovini	GK	28 February 1990 (age 36)	Guillermo Brown
	Argentina	Maximiliano Velazco	GK	8 March 1995 (age 31)	River Plate (loan)
Defenders
	Argentina	Nicolás Álvarez	RB	22 January 1990 (age 36)	Chacarita Juniors
	Argentina	Leandro Caballero	RB	13 February 1986 (age 40)	UAI Urquiza
	Argentina	Elvio Gelmini	DF	31 March 1996 (age 30)	Guillermo Brown
	Argentina	Luciano Goux	CB	27 January 1980 (age 46)	Everton
	Argentina	Leandro Martínez	CB	21 April 1987 (age 39)	Tampico Madero
	Argentina	Gonzalo Mottes	CB		Gimnasia y Esgrima (LP)
	Argentina	Leonel Müller	DF	13 May 1996 (age 30)	Huracán
	Argentina	Iván Nadal	LB	18 May 1987 (age 39)	Platense
	Argentina	Cristian Podestá	RB	24 January 1991 (age 35)	Atlanta
Midfielders
	Argentina	Maximiliano Ferreira	MF	10 January 1989 (age 37)	Brown
	Argentina	Marcos Giménez	LM	12 April 1989 (age 37)	Talleres
	Argentina	Marcelo Lamas	CM	28 February 1986 (age 40)	Brown
	Argentina	Federico Marín	CM	24 March 1998 (age 28)	Huracán (loan)
	Argentina	Maximiliano Núñez	AM	17 September 1986 (age 40)	Atlético Bucaramanga
	Argentina	Juan Manuel Olivares	RM	14 July 1988 (age 38)	Brown
	Argentina	Jonathan Osan	MF	5 December 1996 (age 29)	Academy
	Argentina	Leandro Rodríguez	LM	24 July 1997 (age 29)	All Boys
	Argentina	Juan Manuel Sosa	CM	11 December 1985 (age 40)	Estudiantes
	Argentina	Sebastián Soto	MF	14 June 1991 (age 35)	Deportivo Riestra
	Argentina	Guillermo Vernetti	AM	17 April 1993 (age 33)	Mitre
Forwards
	Argentina	Ezequiel Aguirre	RW	10 January 1992 (age 34)	River Plate
	Argentina	Gonzalo Aquilino	FW	20 February 2000 (age 26)	Academy
	Argentina	Nicolás Benegas	CF	1 March 1996 (age 30)	Brown
	Argentina	Gustavo Fernández	CF	4 August 1990 (age 36)	Deportivo Laferrere
	Argentina	Diego Medina	RW	16 December 1991 (age 34)	Deportivo Armenio
	Argentina	Pablo Miranda	CF	14 December 1984 (age 41)	Sportivo Desamparados
	Argentina	Matías Quiroga	CF	14 April 1986 (age 40)	Atlético de Rafaela

== Transfers ==
Domestic transfer windows:
3 July 2019 to 24 September 2019
20 January 2020 to 19 February 2020.

=== Transfers in ===
Date from	Position	Nationality	Name	From	Ref.
3 July 2019 (Note: Deal agreed on 30 May 2019)	MF	Argentina	Sebastián Soto	Deportivo Riestra	
3 July 2019 (Note: Deal agreed on 7 June 2019)	CF	Argentina	Nicolás Benegas	Brown	
3 July 2019 (Note: Deal agreed on 7 June 2019)	CM	Argentina	Marcelo Lamas	Brown	
3 July 2019 (Note: Deal agreed on 10 June 2019)	DF	Argentina	Elvio Gelmini	Guillermo Brown	
3 July 2019 (Note: Deal agreed on 15 June 2019)	CF	Argentina	Pablo Miranda	Sportivo Desamparados	
3 July 2019 (Note: Deal agreed on 19 June 2019)	CF	Argentina	Matías Quiroga	Atlético de Rafaela	
3 July 2019 (Note: Deal agreed on 20 June 2019)	DF	Argentina	Leonel Müller	Huracán	
3 July 2019 (Note: Deal agreed on 26 June 2019)	RM	Argentina	Juan Manuel Olivares	Brown	
3 July 2019 (Note: Deal agreed on 28 June 2019)	GK	Argentina	Sebastián Giovini	Guillermo Brown	
5 July 2019	AM	Argentina	Guillermo Vernetti	Mitre	
5 July 2019	RB	Argentina	Nicolás Álvarez	Chacarita Juniors	
19 July 2019	AM	Argentina	Maximiliano Núñez	Atlético Bucaramanga	
19 July 2019	GK	Argentina	Martín García	Argentino	
21 August 2019	CB	Argentina	Gonzalo Mottes	Gimnasia y Esgrima (LP)	
21 August 2019	LM	Argentina	Leandro Rodríguez	All Boys	

=== Transfers out ===
Date from	Position	Nationality	Name	To	Ref.
3 July 2019 (Note: Deal agreed on 6 June 2019)	AM	Argentina	Kevin Dubini	Justo José de Urquiza	
3 July 2019 (Note: Deal agreed on 13 June 2019)	CB	Argentina	Francisco Martínez	Tristán Suárez	
3 July 2019 (Note: Deal agreed on 22 June 2019)	CB	Argentina	Christian Moreno	Acassuso	
4 July 2019	LM	Argentina	Nahuel Peralta	Deportivo Armenio	
17 July 2019	GK	Argentina	Cristian Correa	Tristán Suárez	

=== Loans in ===
Start date	Position	Nationality	Name	From	End date	Ref.
15 August 2019	CM	Argentina	Federico Marín	Huracán	30 June 2020	

== Friendlies ==
=== Pre-season ===
Defensa y Justicia, of the Primera División, revealed pre-season friendlies with Defensores de Belgrano on 27 June. They also met Centro Integral del Futbolista Argentino, a team of free agents, and the Vélez Sarsfield Reserves. Defensores would face Acassuso on 25 July, Ferro Carril Oeste on 2 August, Huracán on 10 August and Fénix on 17 August.

Win Draw Loss

29 June 2019 Friendly	Defensa y Justicia	2–0	Defensores de Belgrano	Argentina
	A. Castro; N. Fernández	Defensa y Justicia

29 June 2019 Friendly	Defensa y Justicia	1–0	Defensores de Belgrano	Argentina
	H. Martínez	Defensa y Justicia

17 July 2019 Friendly	Defensores de Belgrano	3–0	Centro Integral del Futbolista Argentino	Buenos Aires, Argentina
	N. Benegas; M. Giménez	Defensores de Belgrano; Olé; 60 min. match		Stadium: Predio Los Cardales

17 July 2019 Friendly	Defensores de Belgrano	2–1	Centro Integral del Futbolista Argentino	Buenos Aires, Argentina
	G. Aquilino; M. Ferreira	Defensores de Belgrano; Olé; 60 min. match	Goal	Stadium: Predio Los Cardales

20 July 2019 Friendly	Vélez Sarsfield Reserves	1–2	Defensores de Belgrano	Ituzaingó, Argentina
09:30 GMT-3	Goal	Defensores de Belgrano; Mundo Ascenso	M. Quiroga; M. Ferreira	Stadium: Villa Olímpica; Attendance: 0 (Note: Behind closed doors.)

20 July 2019 Friendly	Vélez Sarsfield Reserves	0–0	Defensores de Belgrano	Ituzaingó, Argentina
		Defensores de Belgrano; Mundo Ascenso		Stadium: Villa Olímpica; Attendance: 0 (Note: Behind closed doors.)

25 July 2019 Friendly	Acassuso	0–2	Defensores de Belgrano	Argentina
		Defensores de Belgrano; Olé	N. Benegas

25 July 2019 Friendly	Acassuso	1–0	Defensores de Belgrano	Argentina
	Goal	Defensores de Belgrano

2 August 2019 Friendly	Ferro Carril Oeste	2–0	Defensores de Belgrano	Buenos Aires, Argentina
	B. Barranco; R. Tesuri	Defensores de Belgrano; Grupo La Provincia; 80 min. match		Stadium: Estadio Arquitecto Ricardo Etcheverry

2 August 2019 Friendly	Ferro Carril Oeste	0–1	Defensores de Belgrano	Buenos Aires, Argentina
		Defensores de Belgrano; Grupo La Provincia; 80 min. match	M. Núñez	Stadium: Estadio Arquitecto Ricardo Etcheverry

10 August 2019 Friendly	Huracán	1–0	Defensores de Belgrano	Buenos Aires, Argentina
	L. Barrios (pen.)	Defensores de Belgrano; Grupo La Provincia		Stadium: Campo de Deportes Jorge Newbery

17 August 2019 Friendly	Defensores de Belgrano	Cancelled	Fénix	Buenos Aires, Argentina
		Defensores de Belgrano		Stadium: Sociedad Alemana de Gimnasia

=== Mid-season ===
A trip to Lanús was scheduled for 21 August.

Win Draw Loss

21 August 2019 Friendly	Lanús	1–1	Defensores de Belgrano	Lanús, Argentina
11:30 GMT-3	Tiago	Defensores de Belgrano; InfoRegión	E. Aguirre	Stadium: Estadio Ciudad de Lanús – Néstor Díaz Pérez

== Competitions ==
=== Primera B Nacional ===
==== Results summary ====
Overall								Home						Away					
Pld	W	D	L	GF	GA	GD	Pts	W	D	L	GF	GA	GD	W	D	L	GF	GA	GD
3	0	2	1	2	3	−1	2	0	1	0	2	2	0	0	1	1	0	1	−1

Last updated: 3 September 2019.
Source: Soccerway

==== Matches ====
The fixtures for the 2019–20 league season were announced on 1 August 2019, with a new format of split zones being introduced. Defensores de Belgrano were drawn in Zone B.

Win Draw Loss

18 August 2019 1	Gimnasia y Esgrima (M)	0–0	Defensores de Belgrano	Mendoza, Argentina
16:00 GMT-3		Defensores de Belgrano; El Ciudadano; Soccerway		Stadium: Estadio Víctor Antonio Legrotaglie; Referee: Lucas Comesaña (Argentina)

26 August 2019 2	Quilmes	1–0	Defensores de Belgrano	Quilmes, Argentina
21:05 GMT-3	M. Prost 53'	Defensores de Belgrano; La Voz del Interior; Soccerway		Stadium: Estadio Centenario Ciudad de Quilmes; Referee: Pablo Dóvalo (Argentina)

31 August 2019 3	Defensores de Belgrano	2–2	Atlético de Rafaela	Buenos Aires, Argentina
15:30 GMT-3	M. Quiroga 9'; E. Aguirre 90+6' (pen.)	Defensores de Belgrano; Diario La Opinión; Soccerway	L. Blondel 79'; J. Quinteros 90+1'	Stadium: Estadio Juan Pasquale; Referee: Maximiliano Ramírez (Argentina)

7 September 2019 4	All Boys	–	Defensores de Belgrano	Buenos Aires, Argentina
13:05 GMT-3				Stadium: Estadio Islas Malvinas

== Squad statistics ==
=== Appearances and goals ===
No.	Pos.	Nationality	Name	League		Cup		League Cup		Continental		Other		Total		Discipline		Ref
No.	Pos.	Nationality	Name	Apps	Goals	Apps	Goals	Apps	Goals	Apps	Goals	Apps	Goals	Apps	Goals	Yellow card	Red card	Ref
–	GK	Argentina	Martín García	0	0	—		—		—		0	0	0	0	0	0	
–	GK	Argentina	Sebastián Giovini	0	0	—		—		—		0	0	0	0	0	0	
–	GK	Argentina	Maximiliano Velazco	3	0	—		—		—		0	0	3	0	0	0	
–	RB	Argentina	Nicolás Álvarez	3	0	—		—		—		0	0	3	0	1	0	
–	RB	Argentina	Leandro Caballero	0	0	—		—		—		0	0	0	0	0	0	
–	DF	Argentina	Elvio Gelmini	0	0	—		—		—		0	0	0	0	0	0	
–	CB	Argentina	Luciano Goux	3	0	—		—		—		0	0	3	0	0	0	
–	CB	Argentina	Leandro Martínez	3	0	—		—		—		0	0	3	0	1	0	
–	CB	Argentina	Gonzalo Mottes	0	0	—		—		—		0	0	0	0	0	0	
–	DF	Argentina	Leonel Müller	0	0	—		—		—		0	0	0	0	0	0	
–	LB	Argentina	Iván Nadal	3	0	—		—		—		0	0	3	0	0	0	
–	RB	Argentina	Cristian Podestá	0	0	—		—		—		0	0	0	0	0	0	
–	MF	Argentina	Maximiliano Ferreira	0(1)	0	—		—		—		0	0	0(1)	0	0	0	
–	LM	Argentina	Marcos Giménez	3	0	—		—		—		0	0	3	0	1	0	
–	CM	Argentina	Marcelo Lamas	3	0	—		—		—		0	0	3	0	0	0	
–	CM	Argentina	Federico Marín	0(1)	0	—		—		—		0	0	0(1)	0	0	0	
–	AM	Argentina	Maximiliano Núñez	0(3)	0	—		—		—		0	0	0(3)	0	0	0	
–	RM	Argentina	Juan Manuel Olivares	3	0	—		—		—		0	0	3	0	0	0	
–	MF	Argentina	Jonathan Osan	0	0	—		—		—		0	0	0	0	0	0	
–	LM	Argentina	Leandro Rodríguez	0	0	—		—		—		0	0	0	0	0	0	
–	CM	Argentina	Juan Manuel Sosa	3	0	—		—		—		0	0	3	0	1	0	
–	MF	Argentina	Sebastián Soto	0(1)	0	—		—		—		0	0	0(1)	0	0	0	
–	AM	Argentina	Guillermo Vernetti	0(2)	0	—		—		—		0	0	0(2)	0	0	0	
–	RW	Argentina	Ezequiel Aguirre	0(1)	1	—		—		—		0	0	0(1)	1	0	0	
–	FW	Argentina	Gonzalo Aquilino	0	0	—		—		—		0	0	0	0	0	0	
–	CF	Argentina	Nicolás Benegas	3	0	—		—		—		0	0	3	0	0	0	
–	CF	Argentina	Gustavo Fernández	0	0	—		—		—		0	0	0	0	0	0	
–	RW	Argentina	Diego Medina	0	0	—		—		—		0	0	0	0	0	0	
–	CF	Argentina	Pablo Miranda	0	0	—		—		—		0	0	0	0	0	0	
–	CF	Argentina	Matías Quiroga	3	1	—		—		—		0	0	3	1	0	0	
Own goals				—	0	—		—		—		—	0	—	0	—	—	—

Statistics accurate as of 3 September 2019.

=== Goalscorers ===
Rank	Pos	No.	Nat	Name	League	Cup	League Cup	Continental	Other	Total	Ref
1	CF	–	Argentina	Matías Quiroga	1	—	—	—	0	1	
1	RW	–	Argentina	Ezequiel Aguirre	1	—	—	—	0	1	
Own goals					0	—	—	—	0	0	
Totals					3	—	—	—	0	3	—

Matías Quiroga
Ezequiel Aguirre
