= Goux =

Goux may refer to:

== People ==
- Fernand Goux (1899–2008), French soldier
- Jean-Paul Goux (born 1948), French writer
- Jules Goux (1885–1965), French driver
- Luciano Goux (born 1980), Argentinian football player
- Marcelo Goux (born 1975), Argentinian football player

== Places ==
- Goux, Gers, France
- Goux-les-Usiers, Doubs, France
- Goux-lès-Dambelin, Doubs, France
- Goux-sous-Landet, Doubs, France
