= Maximiliano Ferreira =

Maximiliano Ferreira may refer to:

- Maximiliano Ferreira (footballer, born 1989), Argentine midfielder for Club Atlético Brown
- Maximiliano Ferreira (footballer, born 1999), Uruguayan midfielder for Club Sportivo Cerrito
