= 2012 U-20 Copa Libertadores =

Copa Libertadores Sub-20 Futuro de América

Tournament details
- Host country: Peru
- Dates: 15 June – 1 July 2012
- Teams: 16 (from 12 confederations)
- Venues: 2 (in 1 host city)

Final positions
- Champions: (Argentina) River Plate (1st title)
- Runners-up: (Uruguay) Defensor Sporting
- Third place: (Brazil) Corinthians

Tournament statistics
- Matches played: 32
- Top scorer(s): (Chile) Rodrigo Gattas (with 6 goals)
- Best player: (Ecuador) Juan Cazares

The 2012 U-20 Copa Libertadores (known as the 2012 Copa Movistar Libertadores Sub-20 for sponsorship reasons) was the second edition of this U-20 club competition. Players born on or after 1 January 1992 were eligible to compete. The tournament was played in Lima, Peru.

== Venues ==
All games were played in Lima at the Estadio Monumental and Estadio Alejandro Villanueva.

| Lima | 2012 U-20 Copa Libertadores is located in Peru |
|---|---|
| Estadio Monumental | 2012 U-20 Copa Libertadores is located in Peru |
| Capacity: 80,093 | 2012 U-20 Copa Libertadores is located in Peru |
| Lima | 2012 U-20 Copa Libertadores is located in Peru |
| Estadio Alejandro Villanueva | 2012 U-20 Copa Libertadores is located in Peru |
| Capacity: 35,000 | 2012 U-20 Copa Libertadores is located in Peru |

== Qualification ==
In addition to the three clubs of the host nation, nine clubs qualified from the remaining nine football associations of CONMEBOL. Also, one team from the Mexican Football Federation and one from the Spanish Football Federation.

| Association | Team | Qualification method |
|---|---|---|
| (Argentina) Argentina; 2 berths | Boca Juniors | 2011 U-20 Copa Libertadores runner up |
| (Argentina) Argentina; 2 berths | River Plate | Invitee |
| (Bolivia) Bolivia; 1 berth | Blooming | 2012 U-20 Torneo Classificatorio champion |
| (Brazil) Brazil; 2 berths | Corinthians | 2012 U-18 Copa São Paulo champion |
| (Brazil) Brazil; 2 berths | América (MG) | 2011 Campeonato Brasileiro Sub-20 Champion |
| (Chile) Chile; 1 berth | Unión Española | 2011 U-18 National champion |
| (Colombia) Colombia; 1 berth | Junior | 2011 U-20 Torneo Postobón champion |
| (Ecuador) Ecuador; 1 berth | Independiente del Valle | 2011 U-18 Serie A champion |
| Mexico (CONCACAF); 1 invitee | América | 2011 U-20 Torneo Clausura champion |
| (Paraguay) Paraguay; 1 berth | Cerro Porteño | 2011 U-20 National champion |
| (Peru) Peru; 3 berths | Universitario | 2011 U-20 Copa Libertadores champion |
| (Peru) Peru; 3 berths | Alianza Lima | 2011 Torneo de Promoción y Reserva champion |
| (Peru) Peru; 3 berths | Sporting Cristal | 2011 U-18 Copa Federación champion |
| (Uruguay) Uruguay; 1 berth | Defensor Sporting | 2011 U-19 champion |
| (Venezuela) Venezuela; 1 berth | Real Esppor | 2011 U-20 Torneo Venezolano champion |
| (Spain) Spain; 1 berth | Atlético Madrid | Invitee |

== Referees ==
A referee and an assistant referee from each federation along with two referees and four assistant referee from the host country where chosen for the tournament.

| Referee | Assistant |
|---|---|
| (Argentina) Néstor Pittana | (Argentina) Juan Belatti |
| (Bolivia) José Jordán | (Bolivia) Wilson Arellano |
| (Brazil) Sandro Ricci | (Brazil) Marcelo Van Gasse |
| (Chile) Julio Bascuñán | (Chile) Marcelo Barraza |
| (Colombia) Adrián Vélez | (Colombia) Alexander Guzmán |
| (Ecuador) Diego Lara | (Ecuador) Byron Romero |

| Referee | Assistant |
|---|---|
| (Paraguay) Ulises Mereles | (Paraguay) Darío Gaona |
| (Peru) Henry Gambetta | (Peru) Raúl López (Peru) Jorge Hurtado |
| (Peru) Miguel Santiváñez | (Peru) Braulio Cornejo (Peru) Victor Raez |
| (Uruguay) Daniel Fedorczuk | (Uruguay) Nicolás Taran |
| (Venezuela) Marlon Escalante | (Venezuela) Carlos López |

== Group stage ==
The winners and runners-up from each group advanced to the quarterfinals.

Key to colors in group tables
| Group winners and runners-up advanced to the quarterfinals |

All kick-off times are local (UTC−05:00).

=== Group A ===
| Pos | Team | Pld | W | D | L | GF | GA | GD | Pts |
|---|---|---|---|---|---|---|---|---|---|
| 1 | (Chile) Unión Española | 3 | 2 | 1 | 0 | 8 | 4 | +4 | 7 |
| 2 | (Peru) Universitario | 3 | 2 | 0 | 1 | 7 | 6 | +1 | 6 |
| 3 | (Mexico) América | 3 | 1 | 1 | 1 | 6 | 4 | +2 | 4 |
| 4 | (Venezuela) Real Esppor | 3 | 0 | 0 | 3 | 1 | 8 | −7 | 0 |

| 15 June 2012 | Unión Española (Chile) | 1–1 | (Mexico) America | Estadio Monumental, Lima |
| 16:00 | Bustos 19' (pen.) | Report | 60' Camacho | Referee: Néstor Pittana |

| 15 June 2012 | Universitario (Peru) | 2–0 | (Venezuela) Real Esppor | Estadio Monumental, Lima |
| 20:30 | López 2'; Bejarano 70' | Report | | Referee: Sandro Ricci |

| 17 June 2012 | Universitario (Peru) | 2–4 | (Chile) Union Española | Estadio Monumental, Lima |
| 18:30 | Camino 60'; Arnillas 40' | Report | 36' Gattas; 51', 77' Bustos; 68' (o.g.) Otarola | Referee: Ulises Mereles |

| 18 June 2012 | Real Esppor (Venezuela) | 0–3 | (Mexico) America | Estadio Alejandro Villanueva, Lima |
| 16:00 | | Report | 44' (pen.), 76' Zúñiga; 81' Cordero | Referee: Diego Lara |

| 21 June 2012 | Real Esppor (Venezuela) | 1–3 | (Chile) Union Española | Estadio Monumental, Lima |
| 16:00 | Jimenez 24' | Report | 21', 26', 40' Gattas |

| 21 June 2012 | Universitario (Peru) | 3–2 | (Mexico) America | Estadio Monumental, Lima |
| 20:30 | Tajima 16'; Rey 21'; Bejarano 80' | Report | 39', 47' (pen.) Zúñiga |

=== Group B ===
| Pos | Team | Pld | W | D | L | GF | GA | GD | Pts |
|---|---|---|---|---|---|---|---|---|---|
| 1 | (Uruguay) Defensor Sporting | 3 | 2 | 1 | 0 | 6 | 1 | +5 | 7 |
| 2 | (Peru) Alianza Lima | 3 | 2 | 0 | 1 | 8 | 6 | +2 | 6 |
| 3 | (Ecuador) Independiente del Valle | 3 | 1 | 0 | 2 | 3 | 4 | −1 | 3 |
| 4 | (Bolivia) Blooming | 3 | 0 | 1 | 2 | 1 | 7 | −6 | 1 |

| 15 June 2012 | Independiente del Valle (Ecuador) | 0–1 | (Uruguay) Defensor Sporting | Estadio Monumental, Lima |
| 18:15 | | Report | 7' Pírez | Referee: Henry Gambetta |

| 16 June 2012 | Alianza Lima (Peru) | 5–0 | (Bolivia) Blooming | Estadio Alejandro Villanueva, Lima |
| 18:30 | Cuba 10'; Mesta 33'; Junior Ponce 44', 57' (pen.); Cartagena 48' | Report | | Referee: Adrian Velez |

| 18 June 2012 | Blooming (Bolivia) | 0–0 | (Uruguay) Defensor Sporting | Estadio Alejandro Villanueva, Lima |
| 18:15 | | Report | | Referee: Miguel Santivanez |

| 18 June 2012 | Alianza Lima (Peru) | 2–1 | (Ecuador) Independiente del Valle | Estadio Alejandro Villanueva, Lima |
| 20:30 | Cuba 59', 87' | Report | 19' Sornoza | Referee: Jose Jordan |

| 22 June 2012 | Blooming (Bolivia) | 1–2 | (Ecuador) Independiente del Valle | Estadio Alejandro Villanueva, Lima |
| 16:00 | Pinto 60' | Report | 30' Silva; 47' Asprillo |

| 22 June 2012 | Alianza Lima (Peru) | 1–5 | (Uruguay) Defensor Sporting | Estadio Alejandro Villanueva, Lima |
| 20:30 | Guerrero 63' | Report | 7' Platero; 14', 80' Gutierrez; 44' De Arrascaeta; 87' Fernandez |

=== Group C ===
| Pos | Team | Pld | W | D | L | GF | GA | GD | Pts |
|---|---|---|---|---|---|---|---|---|---|
| 1 | (Paraguay) Cerro Porteño | 3 | 2 | 1 | 0 | 6 | 3 | +3 | 7 |
| 2 | (Brazil) América (MG) | 3 | 2 | 1 | 0 | 6 | 4 | +2 | 7 |
| 3 | (Argentina) Boca Juniors | 3 | 1 | 0 | 2 | 6 | 5 | +1 | 3 |
| 4 | (Peru) Sporting Cristal | 3 | 0 | 0 | 3 | 2 | 8 | −6 | 0 |

| 16 June 2012 | Sporting Cristal (Peru) | 1–3 | (Paraguay) Cerro Porteño | Estadio Alejandro Villanueva, Lima |
| 14:00 | Adrianzen 6' | Report | 21' Romero; 44' Serna; 49' Garcia | Referee: Daniel Fedorczuk |

| 16 June 2012 | Boca Juniors (Argentina) | 2–3 | (Brazil) América (MG) | Estadio Alejandro Villanueva, Lima |
| 16:15 | Suarez 4'; Fragapane 15' | Report | 10' Martinez; 15' Patrick; 40' Anderson | Referee: Marlon Escalante |

| 19 June 2012 | América (MG) (Brazil) | 1–1 | (Paraguay) Cerro Porteño | Estadio Monumental, Lima |
| 16:00 | Suarez 77' | Report | 87' Almirón |

| 19 June 2012 | Boca Juniors (Argentina) | 3–0 | (Peru) Sporting Cristal | Estadio Monumental, Lima |
| 20:30 | Guerra 32', 46'; Palacios 60' | Report |

| 22 June 2012 | Boca Juniors (Argentina) | 1–2 | (Paraguay) Cerro Porteño | Estadio Alejandro Villanueva, Lima |
| 18:15 | Guerra 13' | Report | 23' Godoy; 26' Valbuena |

| 23 June 2012 | América (MG) (Brazil) | 2–1 | (Peru) Sporting Cristal | Estadio Monumental, Lima |
| 20:30 | Patrick 6'; Silas 23' | Report | 43' Andrianzen |

=== Group D ===
| Pos | Team | Pld | W | D | L | GF | GA | GD | Pts |
|---|---|---|---|---|---|---|---|---|---|
| 1 | (Argentina) River Plate | 3 | 2 | 1 | 0 | 8 | 2 | +6 | 7 |
| 2 | (Brazil) Corinthians | 3 | 1 | 2 | 0 | 5 | 3 | +2 | 5 |
| 3 | (Colombia) Junior | 3 | 1 | 0 | 2 | 4 | 9 | −5 | 3 |
| 4 | (Spain) Atlético Madrid | 3 | 0 | 1 | 2 | 5 | 8 | −3 | 1 |

| 17 June 2012 | Corinthians (Brazil) | 2–0 | (Colombia) Junior | Estadio Monumental, Lima |
| 14:00 | Michael 5'; Natal 29' | Report | | Referee: Julio Bascunan |

| 17 June 2012 | Atlético Madrid (Spain) | 1–2 | (Argentina) River Plate | Estadio Monumental, Lima |
| 16:15 | Oueslati 88' | Report | Cazares 60'; Solari 81' | Referee: Henry Gambetta |

| 19 June 2012 | Corinthians (Brazil) | 2–2 | (Spain) Atlético Madrid | Estadio Monumental, Lima |
| 18:15 | Rodineo 82'; Paulinho 84' | Report | 43' Yago; 54' Domenech | Referee: Nestor Pittana |

| 21 June 2012 | Junior (Colombia) | 0–5 | (Argentina) River Plate | Estadio Monumental, Lima |
| 18:15 | | Report | Cazares 34', 84'; Denot 80'; Vila 90', 90+2' |

| 23 June 2012 | Junior (Colombia) | 4–2 | (Spain) Atlético Madrid | Estadio Monumental, Lima |
| 16:00 | Orozco 7'; Escalante 50'; Abián (o.g.); S. Martínez 65' | Report | 30' Oueslati; 32' Abián |

| 23 June 2012 | Corinthians (Brazil) | 1–1 | (Argentina) River Plate | Estadio Monumental, Lima |
| 18:15 | Paulinho 30' | Report | 90' Aguirre |

== Knockout phase ==
No extra time, if two teams tied after 90 minutes then there is a penalty shoot-out.

Quarterfinals
25 June – Lima
(Chile) Unión Española | 1 (4)
(Peru) Alianza Lima | 1 (2)
25 June – Lima
(Peru) Universitario | 0 (2)
(Uruguay) Defensor Sporting | 0 (4)
26 June – Lima
(Paraguay) Cerro Porteño | 0 (1)
(Brazil) Corinthians | 0 (4)
26 June – Lima
(Brazil) América (MG) | 0 (5)
(Argentina) River Plate | 0 (6)

Semifinals
28 June – Lima
(Chile) Unión Española | 1 (2)
(Uruguay) Defensor Sporting | 1 (4)
28 June – Lima
(Brazil) Corinthians | 0
(Argentina) River Plate | 2

Final
1 July – Lima
(Uruguay) Defensor Sporting | 0
(Argentina) River Plate | 1
Third place
1 July – Lima
(Chile) Unión Española | 1
(Brazil) Corinthians | 2

=== Quarterfinals ===
| 25 June 2012 | Union Española (Chile) | 1–1 (4–2 p) | (Peru) Alianza Lima | Estadio Monumental "U", Lima |
| 17:30 | Bustos 73' | Report | Cartagena 13' | Referee: Daniel Fedorczuk |
| | Penalties |
| | Larenas (penalty scored); Gattas (penalty scored); Saavedra (penalty scored); Donadell (penalty scored) | | (penalty scored) Aparicio; (penalty scored) Guerrero; (penalty missed) Cuba; (penalty missed) Vidales |

| 25 June 2012 | Universitario (Peru) | 0–0 (2–4 p) | (Uruguay) Defensor Sporting | Estadio Monumental "U", Lima |
| 20:15 | | Report |
| | Penalties |
| | Goyoneche (penalty scored); Arnillas (penalty missed); Lopez (penalty scored); Gonzales (penalty missed) | | (penalty scored) Malvino; (penalty scored) Zeballos; (penalty scored) Gutierrez; (penalty scored) Foliados |

| 26 June 2012 | Cerro Porteño (Paraguay) | 0–0 (1–4 p) | (Brazil) Corinthians | Estadio Alejandro Villanueva, Lima |
| 17:30 | | Report |
| | Penalties |
| | Serna (penalty missed); Garcia (penalty scored); Romero (penalty missed) | | (penalty scored) Denner; (penalty scored) Natal; (penalty scored) Nick; (penalty scored) Edilson |

| 26 June 2012 | América (MG) (Brazil) | 0–0 (5–6 p) | (Argentina) River Plate | Estadio Alejandro Villanueva, Lima |
| 19:45 | | Report |
| | Penalties |
| | Patrick (penalty scored); China (penalty scored); Lemos (penalty scored); Vitinho (penalty scored); Anderson (penalty missed); Bene (penalty scored); Bruno (penalty missed) | | (penalty scored) Servio; (penalty missed) Denot; (penalty scored) Martínez; (penalty scored) Kranevitter; (penalty scored) Cazares; (penalty scored) Garate; (penalty scored) Gomez |

=== Semifinals ===
| 28 June 2012 | Union Española (Chile) | 1–1 (1–3 p) | (Uruguay) Defensor Sporting | Estadio Alejandro Villanueva, Lima |
| 17:45 | Gattas 59' | Report | 45' De Arrascaeta |
| | Penalties |
| | Larenas (penalty missed); Gattas (penalty missed); Saavedra (penalty scored); Donadell (penalty missed) | | (penalty scored) Malvino; (penalty scored) Zeballos; (penalty scored) Gutierrez |

| 28 June 2012 | Corinthians (Brazil) | 0–2 | (Argentina) River Plate | Estadio Monumental "U", Lima |
| 20:00 | | Report | Cazares 21'; Gomez 34' |

=== Third-place match ===
| 1 July 2012 | Unión Española (Chile) | 1–2 | (Brazil) Corinthians | Estadio Alejandro Villanueva, Lima |
| 15:45 | Gattas 31' | Report | 11' Fernando; 43' Edilson |

=== Final ===
| 1 July 2012 | Defensor Sporting (Uruguay) | 0–1 | (Argentina) River Plate | Estadio Alejandro Villanueva, Lima |
| 18:00 | | Report | Solari 50' |

== Final standings ==
| Pos | Team | Pld | W | D | L | GF | GA | GD | Pts |
|---|---|---|---|---|---|---|---|---|---|
| 1 | (Argentina) River Plate | 6 | 4 | 2 | 0 | 11 | 2 | +9 | 11 |
| 2 | (Uruguay) Defensor Sporting | 6 | 2 | 3 | 1 | 7 | 3 | +4 | 7 |
Eliminated in the Semi-finals
| 3 | (Brazil) Corinthians | 6 | 2 | 3 | 1 | 7 | 4 | +2 | 9 |
| 4 | (Chile) Unión Española | 6 | 2 | 3 | 1 | 11 | 8 | +3 | 8 |
Eliminated in the Quarterfinals
| 5 | (Paraguay) Cerro Porteño | 4 | 2 | 2 | 0 | 6 | 3 | +3 | 7 |
| 6 | (Brazil) América (MG) | 4 | 2 | 2 | 0 | 6 | 4 | +2 | 7 |
| 7 | (Peru) Alianza Lima | 4 | 2 | 1 | 1 | 9 | 7 | +2 | 6 |
| 8 | (Peru) Universitario | 4 | 2 | 1 | 1 | 7 | 6 | +1 | 6 |
Eliminated in the First Stage
| 9 | (Mexico) América | 3 | 1 | 1 | 1 | 6 | 4 | +2 | 4 |
| 10 | (Argentina) Boca Juniors | 3 | 1 | 0 | 2 | 6 | 5 | +1 | 3 |
| 11 | (Ecuador) Independiente del Valle | 3 | 1 | 0 | 2 | 3 | 4 | -1 | 3 |
| 12 | (Colombia) Junior | 3 | 1 | 0 | 2 | 4 | 9 | -5 | 3 |
| 13 | (Spain) Atlético Madrid | 3 | 0 | 1 | 2 | 5 | 8 | -3 | 1 |
| 14 | (Bolivia) Blooming | 3 | 0 | 1 | 2 | 1 | 7 | -6 | 1 |
| 15 | (Peru) Sporting Cristal | 3 | 0 | 0 | 3 | 2 | 8 | -6 | 0 |
| 16 | (Venezuela) Real Esppor | 3 | 0 | 0 | 3 | 1 | 8 | -7 | 0 |

== Scorers ==
5 goals

- (Chile) Ramsés Bustos (Unión Española)
- (Mexico) Martín Zúñiga (América)
- (Chile) Rodrigo Gattas (Unión Española)

4 goals

- (Ecuador) Juan Cazares (River Plate)
- (Peru) Junior Ponce (Alianza Lima)

3 goals

- (Peru) Rodrigo Cuba(Alianza Lima)
- (Argentina) Grabiel Guerra (Boca Juniors)

2 goals

- (Argentina) Luis Vila (River Plate)
- (Uruguay) Cristhian Gutierrez Almeida (Defensor Sporting)
- (Brazil) Paulinho (Corinthians)
- (Brazil) Patrick (América (MG))
- (Tunisia) Abdelkader Oueslati (Atlético Madrid)
- (Peru) Diego Bejarano (Universitario)
- (Peru) Christian Adrianzén (Sporting Cristal)
- (Argentina) Augusto Solari (River Plate)
- (Uruguay) Giorgian De Arrascaeta (Defensor Sporting)

1 goal

- (Argentina) Ezequiel Aguirre (River Plate)
- (Argentina) Daniel Denot (River Plate)
- (Brazil) Rodineo (Corinthians)
- (Brazil) Jean Natal (Corinthians)
- (Brazil) Michael (Corinthians)
- (Brazil) Fernando (Corinthians)
- (Brazil) Edilson (Corinthians)
- (Uruguay) Jhon Pírez (Defensor Sporting)
- (Uruguay) Federico Platero (Defensor Sporting)

1 goal

- (Uruguay) Juan M. Fernández Otero (Defensor Sporting)
- (Spain) Abian Serrano (Atlético Madrid)
- (Spain) Domenech Fernandez (Atlético Madrid)
- (Brazil) Soares (America (MG))
- (Brazil) Anderson (America (MG))
- (Brazil) Elivelton Silas (America (MG))
- (Paraguay) Oscar Romero (Cerro Porteño)
- (Paraguay) Epifano Garcia (Cerro Porteño)
- (Paraguay) Diego Godoy (Cerro Porteño)
- (Paraguay) Miguel Almiron (Cerro Porteño)
- (Paraguay) César Serna (Cerro Porteño)
- (Paraguay) Jorge Valbuena (Cerro Porteño)
- (Peru) Miguel Mesta (Alianza Lima)
- (Peru) Wilder Cartagena (Alianza Lima)
- (Mexico) Gil Cordero Burgos (América)
- (Venezuela) José Jiménez (Real Esppor)
- (Argentina) Mariano Suárez (Boca Juniors)
- (Argentina) Franco Fragapane (Boca Juniors)
- (Argentina) Sebastian Palacios (Boca Juniors)
- (Ecuador) Junior Sornoza (Independiente José Terán)
- (Ecuador) Wilson A. Morales Silva (Independiente José Terán)
- (Ecuador) Gustavo A. Asprillas (Independiente Jose Teran)
- (Peru) José Arnillas (Universitario)
- (Peru) Mauricio López (Universitario)
- (Peru) Johan Rey (Universitario)
- (Peru) Mario Tajima (Universitario)
- (Peru) Rodrigo Camino (Universitario)
- (Bolivia) Denis Pinto (Blooming)
- (Colombia) Norvey Orosco (Junior)
- (Colombia) Leiner Escalante (Junior)
- (Colombia) Sergio L. Martinez (Junior)
