= Vernetti =

Vernetti is a surname. Notable people with the surname include:

- Gianni Vernetti (born 1960), Italian politician
- Guillermo Vernetti (born 1993), Argentine professional footballer
- Laura Pérez Vernetti (born 1958), Spanish cartoonist and illustrator
