= Nicolás Álvarez =

Nicolás Álvarez may refer to:

- Nicolás Álvarez (footballer) (born 1990), Argentine footballer
- Nicolás Álvarez (tennis) (born 1996), Peruvian tennis player
- Nicolás Álvarez (field hockey) (born 2003), Spanish field hockey player
