= Diego Medina =

Diego Medina may refer to:

- Diego Medina (footballer, born 1991), Argentine football forward for Estudiantes SL
- Diego Medina (footballer, born 2001), Mexican football winger for Santos Laguna
- Diego Medina (footballer, born 2002), Bolivian football centre-back for Always Ready
