= Sebastian Soto =

Sebastian Soto may refer to:

- Sebastián Soto (footballer, born 1991), Argentine footballer
- Sebastian Soto (soccer, born 2000), American former professional soccer player
- Sebastián Soto Velasco (born 1977), Chilean lawyer, academic, and political advisor
