= Leandro Martínez =

Leandro Martínez may refer to:

- Leandro Antonio Martínez (born 1989), Argentine-Italian football forward
- Leandro Emmanuel Martínez (born 1994), Argentine football striker
- Leandro Martínez Montagnoli (born 1987), Argentine footballer
- Leandro Martínez (baseball) (born 1978), Cuban baseball pitcher
