= Montagnoli =

Montagnoli is a surname. Notable people with the surname include:

- Alessandro Montagnoli (born 1973), Italian politician
- Leandro Martínez Montagnoli (born 1987), Argentine footballer
- José Montagnoli (1926–1994), Argentine footballer
