= Nahuel Peralta =

Argentine footballer

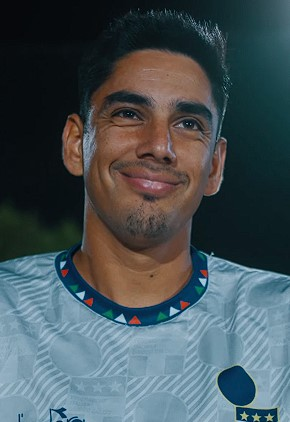
- Peralta in 2023

Personal information
- Full name: Nahuel Iván Peralta
- Date of birth: 12 November 1991 (age 35)
- Place of birth: Ingeniero Pablo Nogués, Argentina
- Height: 1.81 m (5 ft 11 1/2 in)
- Position: Midfielder

Team information
- Current team: Luján

Senior career*
| Years | Team | Apps | (Gls) |
| 2012–2018 | Deportivo Armenio | 93 | (6) |
| 2015–2016 | → Temperley (loan) | 1 | (0) |
| 2016–2017 | → Atlanta (loan) | 30 | (7) |
| 2017–2018 | → Stade Nyonnais (loan) | 8 | (1) |
| 2018–2019 | Defensores de Belgrano | 2 | (0) |
| 2019–2020 | Deportivo Armenio | 20 | (3) |
| 2021 | UAI Urquiza | 24 | (3) |
| 2022– | Luján | 10 | (2) |
- * Club domestic league appearances and goals as of 18:33, 13 July 2022 (UTC)

Nahuel Iván Peralta (born 12 November 1991) is an Argentine professional footballer who plays as a midfielder for Club Luján.

== Career ==
Deportivo Armenio were Peralta's first club, he began featuring for them in the 2012–13 Primera B Metropolitana. He made his debut on 21 August 2012 at the Estadio Alfredo Beranger versus Temperley, before scoring his first goal four months later against Flandria. He ended his first season with one goal in twenty-nine games, which preceded a further five goals and sixty-nine appearances for Deportivo Armenio in the next two years. In July 2015, Peralta was loaned by Argentine Primera División side Temperley. He stayed for 2015 and 2016 but made just one league appearance - against Defensa y Justicia in April 2016.

On 28 July 2016, Peralta returned to Primera B Metropolitana after he was loaned to Atlanta. Seven goals arrived during 2016–17, which included a hat-trick over San Telmo on 26 October. August 2017 saw Peralta leave Argentine football to play in Switzerland for Stade Nyonnais on loan. He returned to his homeland ten months later, after Stade Nyonnais secured a second-place finish in the Swiss Promotion League. Peralta left Deportivo Armenio permanently in July 2018 to join Defensores de Belgrano of Primera B Nacional. His first appearance arrived on 12 December against former club Temperley.

== Career statistics ==
As of 15 December 2018.

Club statistics
| Club | Season | League | | | Cup (Note: Includes the Copa Argentina) | | League Cup | | Continental | | Other | | Total | |
| Club | Season | Division | Apps | Goals | Apps | Goals | Apps | Goals | Apps | Goals | Apps | Goals | Apps | Goals |
|---|---|---|---|---|---|---|---|---|---|---|---|---|---|---|
| Deportivo Armenio | 2012–13 | Primera B Metropolitana | 26 | 1 | 3 | 0 | — | | — | | 0 | 0 | 29 | 1 |
| Deportivo Armenio | 2013–14 | Primera B Metropolitana | 31 | 2 | 0 | 0 | — | | — | | 0 | 0 | 31 | 2 |
| Deportivo Armenio | 2014 | Primera B Metropolitana | 14 | 0 | 1 | 0 | — | | — | | 0 | 0 | 15 | 0 |
| Deportivo Armenio | 2015 | Primera B Metropolitana | 22 | 3 | 1 | 0 | — | | — | | 0 | 0 | 23 | 3 |
| Deportivo Armenio | 2016 | Primera B Metropolitana | 0 | 0 | 0 | 0 | — | | — | | 0 | 0 | 0 | 0 |
| Deportivo Armenio | 2016–17 | Primera C Metropolitana | 0 | 0 | 0 | 0 | — | | — | | 0 | 0 | 0 | 0 |
| Deportivo Armenio | 2017–18 | Primera C Metropolitana | 0 | 0 | 0 | 0 | — | | — | | 0 | 0 | 0 | 0 |
| Deportivo Armenio | Total | | 93 | 6 | 5 | 0 | — | | — | | 0 | 0 | 98 | 6 |
| Temperley (loan) | 2015 | Primera División | 0 | 0 | 0 | 0 | — | | — | | 0 | 0 | 0 | 0 |
| Temperley (loan) | 2016 | Primera División | 1 | 0 | 1 | 0 | — | | — | | 0 | 0 | 2 | 0 |
| Temperley (loan) | Total | | 1 | 0 | 1 | 0 | — | | — | | 0 | 0 | 2 | 0 |
| Atlanta (loan) | 2016–17 | Primera B Metropolitana | 30 | 7 | 0 | 0 | — | | — | | 1 (Note: One appearance in the 2016–17 Primera B Metropolitana play-offs) | 0 | 31 | 7 |
| Defensores de Belgrano | 2018–19 | Primera B Nacional | 1 | 0 | 0 | 0 | — | | — | | 0 | 0 | 1 | 0 |
| Career total | | | 125 | 13 | 6 | 0 | — | | — | | 1 | 0 | 132 | 13 |
