= Juan Ignacio Baiardino =

Argentine footballer

Personal information
- Full name: Juan Ignacio Baiardino
- Date of birth: 26 September 1999 (age 27)
- Place of birth: Buenos Aires, Argentina
- Height: 1.79 m (5 ft 10 in)
- Position: Forward

Team information
- Current team: Defensores de Belgrano (on loan from Boca Juniors)

Youth career
- 2012–2020: Boca Juniors

Senior career*
Years	Team	Apps	(Gls)
2020–	Boca Juniors	0	(0)
2020–2021	→ Chacarita Juniors (loan)	32	(4)
2022–	→ Defensores (loan)	18	(1)
- * Club domestic league appearances and goals as of 16:50, 14 July 2022 (UTC)

Juan Ignacio Baiardino (born 26 September 1999) is an Argentine professional footballer who plays as a forward in Defensores de Belgrano, on loan from Boca Juniors.

== Career ==
Baiardino began his youth career at a local club in Ramos Mejía, before heading to an Argentine subsidiary team of Spanish side Barcelona at the age of nine. In 2012, Baiardino joined the academy of Boca Juniors. He signed his first professional contract on 15 September 2020, prior to sealing a loan move to Primera Nacional with Chacarita Juniors; penning terms until 31 December 2021. After debuting in a defeat away to Instituto on 28 November, Baiardino scored goals for the club against Quilmes and Almagro across seven appearances in 2020; just one of which was as a starter.

After 15 months at Chacarita, Baiardino returned to Boca Juniors. Shortly after, on 9 January 2022, he was sent out on a new loan spell, this time at Defensores de Belgrano for a year.

== Career statistics ==
As of 9 January 2022.

Appearances and goals by club, season and competition
Club	Season	League			Cup		League Cup		Continental		Other		Total	
Club	Season	Division	Apps	Goals	Apps	Goals	Apps	Goals	Apps	Goals	Apps	Goals	Apps	Goals
Boca Juniors	2020–21 (Note: Soccerway counts 2020 Copa de la Liga Profesional appearances as league appearances.)	Primera División	0	0	0	0	0	0	0	0	0	0	0	0
Boca Juniors	2021 (Note: Soccerway counts 2021 Copa de la Liga Profesional appearances as league appearances.)	Primera División	0	0	0	0	—		0	0	0	0	0	0
Boca Juniors	Total		0	0	0	0	—		0	0	0	0	0	0
Chacarita Juniors (loan)	2020	Primera Nacional	7	2	0	0	—		—		0	0	7	2
Defensores de Belgrano	2022	Primera B Nacional												
Career total			7	2	0	0	0	0	0	0	0	0	7	2
