= Marcos Giménez (footballer, born 1989) =

Argentine footballer

Personal information
- Full name: Marcos José Giménez
- Date of birth: 12 April 1989 (age 37)
- Place of birth: Lanús, Argentina
- Height: 1.82 m (5 ft 11 1/2 in)
- Position: Midfielder

Team information
- Current team: Brown de Adrogué

Youth career
- Talleres RE

Senior career*
Years	Team	Apps	(Gls)
2007–2009	Talleres RE	58	(7)
2009–2010	All Boys	1	(0)
2010	Tristán Suárez	23	(1)
2011–2012	Temperley	16	(3)
2012–2013	San Telmo	11	(0)
2013–2017	Talleres RE	127	(14)
2017–2021	Defensores de Belgrano	75	(5)
2021	Atlético de Rafaela	15	(1)
2022–	Brown de Adrogué	12	(0)
- * Club domestic league appearances and goals as of 19:32, 29 June 2022 (UTC)

Marcos José Giménez (born 12 April 1989) is an Argentine professional footballer who plays as a midfielder for Brown de Adrogué.

== Career ==
Giménez's senior career began in 2007 in the ranks of Primera B Metropolitana's Talleres. After seven goals, including four during his last season of 2008–09 which concluded with relegation, in fifty-eight matches, Giménez left the club in July 2009 to join All Boys of Primera B Nacional. A forty-four minute cameo against Deportivo Merlo on 5 March 2010 was the midfielder's only appearance for All Boys. Moves to third tier sides Tristán Suárez and Temperley followed up until 2012, with Giménez appearing thirty-nine times and scoring four goals. Giménez spent the 2012–13 Primera B Metropolitana campaign with San Telmo.

In June 2013, Giménez completed a return to Talleres; now playing their football in Primera C Metropolitana. He remained with them for four years, featuring in over one hundred fixtures as they won their place back to Primera B Metropolitana in 2015. On 16 July 2017, Giménez joined Defensores de Belgrano. He netted his first goal during the promotion play-offs against former club Tristán Suárez on 15 May 2018, on their way to securing promotion to Primera B Nacional. In February 2022, Giménez moved to Atlético de Rafaela.

Ahead of the 2022 season, Giménez officially joined Primera Nacional side Brown de Adrogué.

== Career statistics ==
As of 15 December 2018.

Club statistics
Club	Season	League			Cup (Note: Includes the Copa Argentina)		League Cup		Continental		Other		Total	
Club	Season	Division	Apps	Goals	Apps	Goals	Apps	Goals	Apps	Goals	Apps	Goals	Apps	Goals
All Boys	2009–10	Primera B Nacional	1	0	0	0	—		—		0	0	1	0
Tristán Suárez	2010–11	Primera B Metropolitana	23	1	0	0	—		—		0	0	23	1
San Telmo	2012–13	Primera B Metropolitana	11	0	1	0	—		—		0	0	12	0
Talleres	2016	Primera B Metropolitana	16	1	1	0	—		—		0	0	17	1
Talleres	2016–17	Primera B Metropolitana	34	5	0	0	—		—		0	0	34	5
Talleres	Total		50	6	1	0	—		—		0	0	51	6
Defensores de Belgrano	2017–18	Primera B Metropolitana	22	0	0	0	—		—		5 (Note: Five appearances in the 2017–18 Primera B Metropolitana play-offs)	1 (Note: One goal in the 2017–18 Primera B Metropolitana play-offs)	27	1
Defensores de Belgrano	2018–19	Primera B Nacional	9	0	1	0	—		—		0	0	10	0
Defensores de Belgrano	Total		31	0	1	0	—		—		5	1	37	1
Career total			116	7	3	0	—		—		5	1	124	8
