= Leonel Müller =

Argentine footballer

Personal information
- Full name: Leonel Ezequiel Müller
- Date of birth: 13 May 1996 (age 30)
- Place of birth: Olavarría, Argentina
- Height: 1.80 m (5 ft 11 in)
- Position: Left-back

Team information
- Current team: Tristán Suárez

Youth career
- Los Toritos
- Banfield
- Huracán

Senior career*
Years	Team	Apps	(Gls)
2016–2019	Huracán	1	(0)
2018–2019	→ Sacachispas (loan)	52	(1)
2019–2021	Defensores de Belgrano	1	(0)
2021–	Tristán Suárez	33	(1)
- * Club domestic league appearances and goals as of 18:05, 4 August 2022 (UTC)

Leonel Ezequiel Müller (born 13 May 1996) is an Argentine professional footballer who plays as a left-back for Tristán Suárez.

== Career ==
Müller started his footballing career with Los Toritos, prior to joining Banfield's system in 2008. Years later, Huracán signed Müller following a successful trial. He was promoted into the first-team of Huracán during the 2016 Argentine Primera División season, subsequently making his professional debut against Unión Santa Fe on 13 May. In 2018, having only appeared once more since his club bow, Müller was loaned out to Primera B Metropolitana's Sacachispas on 9 January. He was selected seventeen times during 2017–18. In total, Müller played fifty-two times whilst also netting his first senior goal - against Comunicaciones.

On 20 June 2019, Müller agreed a permanent move to Defensores de Belgrano ahead of 2019–20. In February 2021, Müller moved to Tristán Suárez.

== Career statistics ==
As of 20 June 2019.

Club statistics
Club	Season	League			Cup		League Cup		Continental		Other		Total	
Club	Season	Division	Apps	Goals	Apps	Goals	Apps	Goals	Apps	Goals	Apps	Goals	Apps	Goals
Huracán	2016	Primera División	1	0	0	0	—		0	0	0	0	1	0
Huracán	2016–17	Primera División	0	0	1	0	—		0	0	0	0	1	0
Huracán	2017–18	Primera División	0	0	0	0	—		0	0	0	0	0	0
Huracán	2018–19	Primera División	0	0	0	0	—		0	0	0	0	0	0
Huracán	Total		1	0	1	0	—		0	0	0	0	2	0
Sacachispas (loan)	2017–18	Primera B Metropolitana	17	0	0	0	—		—		0	0	17	0
Sacachispas (loan)	2018–19	Primera B Metropolitana	35	1	0	0	—		—		0	0	35	1
Sacachispas (loan)	Total		52	1	0	0	—		—		0	0	52	1
Career total			53	1	1	0	—		0	0	0	0	54	1
