= Cristian Podestá =

Argentine footballer

Personal information
- Full name: Cristian Aldo Podestá
- Date of birth: 24 January 1991 (age 35)
- Place of birth: Buenos Aires, Argentina
- Height: 1.73 m (5 ft 8 in)
- Position: Midfielder

Youth career
- 2000–2012: Boca Juniors

Senior career*
Years	Team	Apps	(Gls)
2012–2013	Justo José de Urquiza	35	(0)
2013–2015	Independiente Rivadavia	30	(0)
2016	Atlanta	15	(0)
2016–2019	Defensores de Belgrano	42	(1)
- * Club domestic league appearances and goals as of 01:04, 4 December 2019 (UTC)

Cristian Aldo Podestá (born 24 January 1991) is an Argentine professional footballer who plays as a midfielder.

== Career ==
Podestá began in Boca Juniors' ranks from 2000, before featuring for Justo José de Urquiza at senior level. He appeared thirty-five times for the Primera C Metropolitana team in 2012–13, prior to moving to Primera B Nacional in 2013 to join Independiente Rivadavia. His professional debut came on 23 September during a victory away to Brown, which was the first of thirty-two appearances for them. In January 2016, Podestá completed a move to Primera B Metropolitana's Atlanta. Eight months later, on 9 August, Defensores de Belgrano signed Podestá. He scored his first senior goal in June 2017 versus Excursionistas.

== Career statistics ==
As of 14 December 2018.

Club statistics
Club	Season	League			Cup (Note: Includes the Copa Argentina)		League Cup		Continental		Other		Total	
Club	Season	Division	Apps	Goals	Apps	Goals	Apps	Goals	Apps	Goals	Apps	Goals	Apps	Goals
Justo José de Urquiza	2012–13	Primera C Metropolitana	35	0	0	0	—		—		0	0	35	0
Independiente Rivadavia	2013–14	Primera B Nacional	3	0	1	0	—		—		0	0	4	0
Independiente Rivadavia	2014	Primera B Nacional	13	0	0	0	—		—		0	0	13	0
Independiente Rivadavia	2015	Primera B Nacional	14	0	1	0	—		—		0	0	15	0
Independiente Rivadavia	Total		30	0	2	0	—		—		0	0	32	0
Atlanta	2016	Primera B Metropolitana	15	0	0	0	—		—		0	0	15	0
Defensores de Belgrano	2016–17	Primera B Metropolitana	28	1	1	0	—		—		1 (Note: One appearance in the 2016–17 Primera B Metropolitana play-offs)	0	30	1
Defensores de Belgrano	2017–18	Primera B Metropolitana	3	0	0	0	—		—		4 (Note: Four appearances in the 2017–18 Primera B Metropolitana play-offs)	0	7	0
Defensores de Belgrano	2018–19	Primera B Nacional	4	0	1	0	—		—		0	0	5	0
Defensores de Belgrano	Total		35	1	2	0	—		—		5	0	42	1
Career total			115	1	4	0	—		—		5	0	124	1
