= Pablo Miranda =

Argentine footballer (born 1984)

Personal information
- Full name: Pablo Martín Miranda
- Date of birth: 14 December 1984 (age 41)
- Place of birth: Ensenada, Argentina
- Height: 1.77 m (5 ft 9 1/2 in)
- Position: Forward

Team information
- Current team: Villa San Carlos

Senior career*
Years	Team	Apps	(Gls)
2001–2010	Villa San Carlos	216	(46)
2010–2014	Godoy Cruz	17	(0)
2012–2013	→ Olimpo (loan)	4	(0)
2013–2014	→ Brown (loan)	29	(1)
2014	Villa San Carlos	19	(7)
2015	Platense	34	(11)
2016–2017	Villa San Carlos	43	(12)
2017–2019	Defensores de Belgrano	45	(5)
2019	Sportivo Desamparados	3	(0)
2019–	Villa San Carlos	21	(7)
- * Club domestic league appearances and goals as of 22:00, 24 March 2020 (UTC)

Pablo Martín Miranda (born 14 December 1984) is an Argentine professional footballer who plays as a forward for Club Atlético Villa San Carlos.

== Career ==
Miranda started his senior career at the age of seventeen, featuring for Villa San Carlos in the 2001–02 Primera D Metropolitana by making eleven appearances and scoring one goal; the club won promotion in that campaign. They did the same seven years later by going up to Primera B Metropolitana in 2008–09, Miranda had netted thirty-seven times in one hundred and sixty-seven fixtures in that period. After spending a year with Villa San Carlos in tier three, Miranda left in June 2010 to join Argentine Primera División side Godoy Cruz. He made his debut on 8 August in a tie at the Estadio Malvinas Argentinas versus Boca Juniors.

Having made twenty appearances in two seasons with Godoy Cruz, including in the 2011 Copa Libertadores against L.D.U. Quito and Independiente, Miranda was loaned out on 3 July 2012 to Primera B Nacional's Olimpo. He was selected four times, of which only one was a start, as Olimpo were eventually promoted to the Primera División. He returned to Primera B Nacional with Brown in 2013–14, eventually participating twenty-nine times as they were relegated. Miranda departed Godoy Cruz permanently in June 2014 after securing a return to Villa San Carlos of Primera B Metropolitana. Seven goals in nineteen games followed.

Miranda spent the 2015 campaign with Platense. He scored on his club debut, netting the opening goal of a home loss to Almirante Brown; that was the first of eleven goals for Miranda in 2015. He rejoined Villa San Carlos for a third time in January 2016, subsequently remaining for both 2016 and 2016–17. On 21 July 2017, Miranda joined Defensores de Belgrano in Primera B Nacional. His first appearance came in September versus ex-club Platense. Torneo Federal A's Sportivo Desamparados signed Miranda in January 2019.

== Career statistics ==
As of 14 April 2019.

Club statistics
Club	Season	League			Cup		Continental		Other		Total	
Club	Season	Division	Apps	Goals	Apps	Goals	Apps	Goals	Apps	Goals	Apps	Goals
Villa San Carlos	2001–02	Primera D Metropolitana	11	1	0	0	—		0	0	11	1
Villa San Carlos	2009–10	Primera B Metropolitana	38	10	0	0	—		0	0	38	10
Villa San Carlos	Total		49	11	0	0	—		0	0	49	11
Godoy Cruz	2010–11	Primera División	13	0	0	0	2 (Note: Appearance(s) in the Copa Libertadores)	0	0	0	15	0
Godoy Cruz	2011–12	Primera División	4	0	1	0	0	0	0	0	5	0
Godoy Cruz	2012–13	Primera División	0	0	0	0	—		0	0	0	0
Godoy Cruz	2013–14	Primera División	0	0	0	0	—		0	0	0	0
Godoy Cruz	Total		17	0	1	0	2	0	0	0	20	0
Olimpo (loan)	2012–13	Primera B Nacional	4	0	1	0	—		0	0	5	0
Brown (loan)	2013–14	Primera B Nacional	29	1	2	1	—		0	0	31	2
Villa San Carlos	2014	Primera B Metropolitana	19	7	0	0	—		0	0	19	7
Platense	2015	Primera B Metropolitana	34	11	0	0	—		0	0	34	11
Villa San Carlos	2016	Primera B Metropolitana	16	5	0	0	—		0	0	16	5
Villa San Carlos	2016–17	Primera B Metropolitana	27	7	0	0	—		0	0	27	7
Villa San Carlos	Total		43	12	0	0	—		0	0	43	12
Defensores de Belgrano	2017–18	Primera B Metropolitana	30	5	0	0	—		5 (Note: Appearance(s) in the Primera B Metropolitana play-offs)	1	35	6
Defensores de Belgrano	2018–19	Primera B Nacional	10	0	1	0	—		0	0	11	0
Defensores de Belgrano	Total		40	5	1	0	—		5	1	46	6
Sportivo Desamparados	2018–19	Torneo Federal A	0	0	1	0	—		0	0	1	0
Career total			235	47	6	1	2	0	5	1	248	49

== Honours ==
Villa San Carlos

- Primera D Metropolitana: 2001–02
- Primera C Metropolitana: 2008–09
