= Kevin Dubini =

Argentine professional footballer

Personal information
- Full name: Kevin Daniel Dubini
- Date of birth: 4 March 1993 (age 33)
- Place of birth: Buenos Aires, Argentina
- Height: 1.80 m (5 ft 11 in)
- Position: Forward

Team information
- Current team: Acassuso

Youth career
- San Miguel

Senior career*
Years	Team	Apps	(Gls)
2013–2015	San Miguel	40	(3)
2015–2016	Atlas	32	(8)
2016–2019	Defensores de Belgrano	13	(1)
2019–2023	JJ Urquiza	82	(8)
2023–2024	Sportivo Italiano	26	(2)
2024–	Acassuso	67	(5)
- * Club domestic league appearances and goals as of 16:42, 21 April 2026 (UTC)

Kevin Daniel Dubini (born 4 March 1993) is an Argentine professional footballer who plays as a forward for Acassuso.

== Career ==
Dubini's career started in 2013 with Primera D Metropolitana's San Miguel. He made thirty-seven appearances and netted three times in his opening two years, prior to making three appearances in the 2015 Primera C Metropolitana; after the club were promoted in the previous year. He left in June 2015 to return to tier five with Atlas. Eight goals in thirty-two games followed. On 30 June 2016, Dubini joined Defensores de Belgrano of Primera B Metropolitana. His debut came on 24 September versus Platense, before his first pro goal in April 2018 against Barracas Central during a season which saw promotion to Primera B Nacional.

== Career statistics ==
As of 17 December 2018.

Club statistics
Club	Season	League			Cup (Note: Includes the Copa Argentina)		League Cup		Continental		Other		Total	
Club	Season	Division	Apps	Goals	Apps	Goals	Apps	Goals	Apps	Goals	Apps	Goals	Apps	Goals
San Miguel	2015	Primera C Metropolitana	3	0	1	0	—		—		0	0	4	0
Defensores de Belgrano	2016–17	Primera B Metropolitana	7	0	0	0	—		—		0	0	7	0
Defensores de Belgrano	2017–18	Primera B Metropolitana	3	1	0	0	—		—		1 (Note: One appearance in the 2017–18 Primera B Metropolitana play-offs)	0	4	1
Defensores de Belgrano	2018–19	Primera B Nacional	0	0	1	0	—		—		0	0	1	0
Defensores de Belgrano	Total		10	1	1	0	—		—		1	0	12	1
Career total			13	1	2	0	—		—		1	0	16	1
