= Tommy Mosquera =

Colombian footballer (born 1976)

Personal information
- Full name: Tommy Mosquera Lozano
- Date of birth: 27 September 1976 (age 50)
- Place of birth: Colombia
- Position: Forward

Senior career*
Years	Team	Apps	(Gls)
-1996	Millonarios F.C.		
1997	Club Deportivo El Cóndor		
- Millonarios F.C.
2001	Estudiantes de Mérida F.C.		
2002	Independiente Santa Fe		
2003	Busan IPark	11	(4)
2004	Defensores de Belgrano		
- * Club domestic league appearances and goals

Tommy Mosquera Korean: 토미; born is a 27 September 1976 in Colombia) is a Colombian retired footballer.
