= Mauro Luque =

Argentine footballer

Personal information
- Full name: Mauro Demian Luque
- Date of birth: 27 May 1999 (age 27)
- Place of birth: Colón, Argentina
- Height: 1.82 m (6 ft 0 in)
- Position: Right-back

Team information
- Current team: Defensores (on loan from Racing Club)

Youth career
- Club Liverpool
- Deportivo Ñapindá
- 2017–2020: Racing Club

Senior career*
Years	Team	Apps	(Gls)
2020–	Racing Club	1	(0)
2021	→ Atlanta (loan)	18	(0)
2022–	→ Defensores (loan)	14	(1)
- * Club domestic league appearances and goals as of 16:21, 14 July 2022 (UTC)

Mauro Demian Luque (born 27 May 1999) is an Argentine professional footballer who plays as a right-back for Defensores de Belgrano, on loan from Racing Club.

== Career ==
After stints with local sides Club Liverpool and Deportivo Ñapindá, Luque departed to Racing Club in 2017. After three years in their academy, Luque was promoted into the first-team under manager Sebastián Beccacece in 2020. He was selected on the substitute's bench for a Copa de la Liga Profesional encounter with Unión Santa Fe on 28 November, with the right-back soon entering in place of Walter Montoya with five minutes remaining to make his senior debut in a 1–0 home win.

In February 2021, Luque moved to Atlanta on a one-year loan deal. Ahead of the 2022 season, Luque was loaned out again, this time to Defensores de Belgrano until the end of 2022.

== Career statistics ==
As of 29 November 2020.

Appearances and goals by club, season and competition
Club	Season	League			Cup		League Cup		Continental		Other		Total	
Club	Season	Division	Apps	Goals	Apps	Goals	Apps	Goals	Apps	Goals	Apps	Goals	Apps	Goals
Racing Club	2020–21 (Note: Soccerway counts Copa de la Liga Profesional appearances as league appearances.)	Primera División	1	0	0	0	0	0	0	0	0	0	1	0
Career total			1	0	0	0	0	0	0	0	0	0	1	0
