= Léiner Escalante =

Colombian footballer (born 1991)

Personal information
- Full name: Léiner de Jesús Escalante Escorcia
- Date of birth: 18 December 1991 (age 34)
- Place of birth: Soledad, Colombia
- Height: 1.70 m (5 ft 7 in)
- Position: Left winger

Team information
- Current team: Comerciantes Unidos
- Number: 10

Senior career*
Years	Team	Apps	(Gls)
2010–2019	Junior	82	(7)
2012–2014	→ Barranquilla (loan)	96	(12)
2018	→ Jaguares de Córdoba (loan)	18	(2)
2020–	CD Santa Rita	9	(1)
- * Club domestic league appearances and goals as of 18:05, 15 September 2019 (UTC)

Léiner de Jesús Escalante Escorcia (born 18 December 1991) is a Colombian professional footballer who plays as a left winger.

== Career ==
On 29 December 2019, Ecuadorian club, CD Santa Rita, confirmed the signing of Escalante.

== Career statistics ==
=== Club ===
As of 9 November 2017 (UTC), after the home match against Independiente Medellín (2017 Copa Colombia)

Club	Division	Season	League^{1}		Cup^{2}		CONMEBOL^{3}		Total	
Club	Division	Season	Apps	Goals	Apps	Goals	Apps	Goals	Apps	Goals
Junior	Categoría Primera A	2010	2	0	—		—		2	0
Junior	Categoría Primera A	2011	3	0	6	0	—		9	0
Junior	Categoría Primera A	2015	20	1	7	2	3	0	30	3
Junior	Categoría Primera A	2016	26	3	5	2	4	1	35	6
Junior	Categoría Primera A	2017	21	1	11	0	1	0	33	1
Junior	Categoría Primera A	2018	6	2	1	0	—		7	2
Junior	Categoría Primera A	2019	4	0	—		—		4	0
Junior	Total		82	7	30	4	8	1	120	12
Barranquilla	Categoría Primera B	2012	31	3	3	1	—		34	4
Barranquilla	Categoría Primera B	2013	30	4	8	0	—		38	4
Barranquilla	Categoría Primera B	2014	35	5	7	2	—		42	7
Barranquilla	Total		96	12	18	3	—		114	15
Jaguares de Córdoba	Categoría Primera A	2018	18	2	—		2	0	20	2
CD Santa Rita	Serie B	2020	9	1	—		—		9	1
Real Potosí	Bolivian Primera División	2021	32	8	—		—		32	8
Deportivo Pasto	Categoría Primera A	2022	33	5	0	0	0	0	33	5
Carlos A. Mannucci	Liga 1	2023	33	2	0	0	0	0	33	2
Career Total			303	37	48	7	10	1	361	45

^{1} Includes Categoría Primera A and Categoría Primera B matches.
^{2} Includes Copa Colombia matches only.
^{3} Includes U-20 Copa Libertadores and Copa Sudamericana matches.

== Honours ==
Junior

- Categoría Primera A (3): 2011–II, 2018–II, 2019–I
- Copa Colombia (2): 2015, 2017
- Superliga Colombiana (1): 2019
