= Marcelo Lamas =

Argentine footballer (born 1986)

Personal information
- Full name: Marcelo Alejandro Lamas
- Date of birth: 28 February 1986 (age 40)
- Place of birth: Buenos Aires, Argentina
- Height: 1.79 m (5 ft 10 1/2 in)
- Position: Midfielder

Team information
- Current team: Defensores de Belgrano

Youth career
- Vélez Sarsfield

Senior career*
Years	Team	Apps	(Gls)
2008	Vélez Sarsfield	0	(0)
2008	→ Estudiantes (loan)		
2008–2009	Almirante Brown	18	(1)
2009–2011	San Telmo	53	(1)
2011–2013	Comunicaciones	64	(3)
2013–2015	Crucero del Norte	42	(0)
2016	Gimnasia y Esgrima	5	(0)
2016–2017	Estudiantes	29	(2)
2017–2019	Brown de Adrogué	43	(2)
2019–	Defensores de Belgrano	5	(0)
- * Club domestic league appearances and goals as of 00:21, 16 September 2019 (UTC)

Marcelo Alejandro Lamas (born 28 February 1986) is an Argentine professional footballer who played as a midfielder for Defensores de Belgrano.

== Career ==
Lamas' career began with Vélez Sarsfield, who loaned him out to Estudiantes. In 2008, Lamas joined Almirante Brown. He scored one goal, against Defensores de Belgrano on 29 September 2008, in eighteen matches during 2008–09. San Telmo signed Lamas in June 2009, with the midfielder subsequently featuring in fifty-three fixtures and netting once across two years with the club. Comunicaciones became Lamas' fifth club in 2011, prior to a move to Crucero del Norte. They won promotion in his second year, which led to Lamas making his first appearance in the Argentine Primera División on 14 February 2015 versus Tigre.

On 4 January 2016, following forty-five matches for Crucero del Norte, Lamas departed to sign for Torneo Federal A's Gimnasia y Esgrima. His stint lasted six months, with Omar Labruna only selecting him in five matches. Lamas subsequently spent the 2016–17 Primera B Metropolitana season with ex-club Estudiantes, netting goals against Fénix and Excursionistas as the club finished sixth - losing in the promotion play-offs to Lamas' old team Comunicaciones. August 2017 saw Lamas join Primera B Nacional side Brown. His opening appearance for them arrived in an away victory versus Almagro on 16 September.

== Career statistics ==
As of 30 November 2018.

Club statistics
Club	Season	League			Cup (Note: Includes the Copa Argentina)		League Cup		Continental		Other		Total	
Club	Season	Division	Apps	Goals	Apps	Goals	Apps	Goals	Apps	Goals	Apps	Goals	Apps	Goals
Almirante Brown	2008–09	Primera B Metropolitana	18	1	0	0	—		—		0	0	18	1
Comunicaciones	2011–12	Primera B Metropolitana	29	2	0	0	—		—		0	0	29	2
Comunicaciones	2012–13	Primera B Metropolitana	35	1	0	0	—		—		0	0	35	1
Comunicaciones	Total		64	3	0	0	—		—		0	0	64	3
Crucero del Norte	2013–14	Primera B Nacional	14	0	2	0	—		—		0	0	16	0
Crucero del Norte	2014	Primera B Nacional	16	0	0	0	—		—		0	0	16	0
Crucero del Norte	2015	Primera División	12	0	1	0	—		—		0	0	13	0
Crucero del Norte	Total		42	0	3	0	—		—		0	0	45	0
Gimnasia y Esgrima	2016	Torneo Federal A	5	0	0	0	—		—		0	0	5	0
Estudiantes	2016–17	Primera B Metropolitana	29	2	2	0	—		—		3 (Note: Three appearances in the 2016–17 Primera B Metropolitana play-offs)	0	34	2
Brown	2017–18	Primera B Nacional	19	1	0	0	—		—		3 (Note: Three appearances in the 2017–18 Primera B Nacional play-offs)	0	22	1
Brown	2018–19	Primera B Nacional	10	1	2	0	—		—		0	0	12	1
Brown	Total		29	2	2	0	—		—		3	0	34	2
Career total			187	8	7	0	—		—		6	0	200	8
