= Cristian Correa (footballer, born 1991) =

Argentine footballer

Personal information
- Full name: Cristian Nicolás Correa
- Date of birth: 25 May 1991 (age 35)
- Place of birth: Reconquista, Argentina
- Height: 1.83 m (6 ft 0 in)
- Position: Goalkeeper

Team information
- Current team: C.S.D. Macará
- Number: 1

Youth career
- Talleres RE

Senior career*
Years	Team	Apps	(Gls)
2013	Talleres RE	4	(0)
2013–2014	Deportivo Español	0	(0)
2015	Argentino de Merlo	0	(0)
2015–2017	Deportivo Español	54	(0)
2017–2018	San Martín T.	0	(0)
2018–2019	Defensores de Belgrano	0	(0)
2019–2021	Tristán Suárez	1	(0)
2021	Mitre	2	(0)
2022	Tristán Suárez	36	(0)
2023	Chacarita Juniors	35	(0)
2024–	C.S.D. Macará	17	(0)
- * Club domestic league appearances and goals as of 17:59, 4 August 2022 (UTC)

Cristian Nicolás Correa (born 25 May 1991) is an Argentine professional footballer who plays as a goalkeeper for C.S.D. Macará.

== Career ==
Correa began in the ranks of Talleres. He was selected four times during the 2012–13 Primera C Metropolitana, which preceded the goalkeeper leaving at the conclusion of the campaign to join fellow fourth tier team Deportivo Español. After no appearances for them in two seasons, Correa left in January 2015 to play for Argentino. Six months later, he rejoined Deportivo Español; now playing in Primera B Metropolitana. His professional debut arrived on 22 September against Platense, which was one of three appearances in 2015. Correa stayed for the subsequent 2016 and 2016–17 campaigns, featuring in fifty-one fixtures.

On 31 July 2017, Correa joined Primera B Nacional side San Martín. They won promotion to the Argentine Primera División in his first twelve months, but he failed to participate in a competitive match during 2017–18; though was an unused substitute twenty-nine times. June 2018 saw Correa complete a move to Defensores de Belgrano. He made his bow on 24 July as the club lost 4–1 to Atlético de Rafaela.

== Career statistics ==
As of 13 December 2018.

Club statistics
Club	Season	League			Cup (Note: Includes the Copa Argentina)		League Cup		Continental		Other		Total	
Club	Season	Division	Apps	Goals	Apps	Goals	Apps	Goals	Apps	Goals	Apps	Goals	Apps	Goals
Talleres	2012–13	Primera C Metropolitana	4	0	0	0	—		—		0	0	4	0
Deportivo Español	2013–14	Primera C Metropolitana	0	0	0	0	—		—		0	0	0	0
Deportivo Español	2014	Primera B Metropolitana	0	0	0	0	—		—		0	0	0	0
Deportivo Español	2015	Primera B Metropolitana	3	0	0	0	—		—		0	0	3	0
Deportivo Español	2016	Primera B Metropolitana	12	0	0	0	—		—		0	0	12	0
Deportivo Español	2016–17	Primera B Metropolitana	36	0	0	0	—		—		3 (Note: Three appearances in the 2016–17 Primera B Metropolitana play-offs)	0	39	0
Deportivo Español	Total		51	0	0	0	—		—		3	0	54	0
San Martín	2017–18	Primera B Nacional	0	0	0	0	—		—		0	0	0	0
Defensores de Belgrano	2018–19	Primera B Nacional	0	0	1	0	—		—		0	0	1	0
Career total			55	0	1	0	—		—		3	0	59	0
