= Sebastián Giovini =

Argentine footballer (born 1990)

Personal information
- Full name: Sebastián Matías Giovini
- Date of birth: 28 February 1990 (age 36)
- Place of birth: La Laguna, Argentina
- Height: 1.86 m (6 ft 1 in)
- Position: Goalkeeper

Team information
- Current team: Brown de Adrogué

Senior career*
Years	Team	Apps	(Gls)
2011–2018	Argentinos Juniors	1	(0)
2016–2017	→ Comunicaciones (loan)	42	(0)
2017–2018	→ Guillermo Brown (loan)	12	(0)
2018–2019	Guillermo Brown	34	(0)
2019–2021	Defensores de Belgrano	21	(0)
2021–2022	Gimnasia Mendoza	38	(0)
2023	Tristán Suárez	18	(0)
2024	Guillermo Brown	24	(0)
2025–	Brown de Adrogué	50	(0)
- * Club domestic league appearances and goals as of 18:04, 16 April 2026 (UTC)

Sebastián Matías Giovini (born 28 February 1990) is an Argentine professional footballer who plays as a goalkeeper for Brown de Adrogué.

== Career ==
Giovini's first senior team was Argentinos Juniors. He was moved into the club's squad for the 2011–12 Primera División season, appearing on the substitutes bench fourteen times but didn't feature as they qualified for the 2012 Copa Sudamericana. His debut arrived in March 2013 against Sportivo Belgrano in the Copa Argentina, with the Torneo Argentino A team eliminating Argentinos Juniors. Giovini had to wait two years for his first league match, with it coming on 18 October 2015 versus Rosario Central. In January 2016, Giovini was loaned to Primera B Metropolitana's Comunicaciones. Forty-two games followed.

On 23 August 2017, Giovini joined Primera B Nacional side Guillermo Brown on loan. Having been an unused substitute for the rest of 2017, a 1–3 loss at home to Atlético de Rafaela in February 2018 saw Giovini participate in his first fixture for the club. He terminated his contract with Argentinos Juniors at the conclusion of 2017–18, subsequently returning to Guillermo Brown on a free transfer.

On 28 June 2019 it was confirmed, that Giovini had joined Defensores de Belgrano.

== Career statistics ==
As of 19 January 2019.

Club statistics
Club	Season	League			Cup		Continental		Other		Total	
Club	Season	Division	Apps	Goals	Apps	Goals	Apps	Goals	Apps	Goals	Apps	Goals
Argentinos Juniors	2011–12	Primera División	0	0	0	0	0	0	0	0	0	0
Argentinos Juniors	2012–13	Primera División	0	0	1	0	0	0	0	0	1	0
Argentinos Juniors	2013–14	Primera División	0	0	0	0	—		0	0	0	0
Argentinos Juniors	2014	Primera B Nacional	0	0	0	0	—		0	0	0	0
Argentinos Juniors	2015	Primera División	1	0	0	0	—		0	0	1	0
Argentinos Juniors	2016	Primera División	0	0	0	0	—		0	0	0	0
Argentinos Juniors	2016–17	Primera B Nacional	0	0	0	0	—		0	0	0	0
Argentinos Juniors	Total		1	0	1	0	0	0	0	0	2	0
Comunicaciones (loan)	2016	Primera B Metropolitana	19	0	0	0	—		0	0	19	0
Comunicaciones (loan)	2016–17	Primera B Metropolitana	23	0	0	0	—		0	0	23	0
Comunicaciones (loan)	Total		42	0	0	0	—		0	0	42	0
Guillermo Brown (loan)	2017–18	Primera B Nacional	12	0	0	0	—		0	0	12	0
Guillermo Brown	2018–19	Primera B Nacional	12	0	1	0	—		0	0	13	0
Guillermo Brown	Total		24	0	1	0	—		0	0	25	0
Career total			67	0	2	0	0	0	0	0	69	0
