= Iván Nadal =

Argentine footballer

Personal information
- Full name: Iván Nadal
- Date of birth: May 18, 1987 (age 39)
- Place of birth: Buenos Aires, Argentina
- Height: 1.70 m (5 ft 7 in)
- Position: Defender

Team information
- Current team: Platense

Senior career*
Years	Team	Apps	(Gls)
2005–2006	Defensores de Belgrano	33	(2)
2006–2009	Huracán	92	(9)
2009–2009	FK Ventspils	0	(0)
2010	Aldosivi	14	(0)
2010–2014	Defensores Belgrano		
2014–	Platense	26	(0)
- * Club domestic league appearances and goals as of 6 May 2015

Iván Nadal (born 18 May 1987) is an Argentine footballer who plays for Platense in the Primera B Metropolitana. He began his career in Talleres (RE), then he played for Club Atlético Huracán in the Primera División Argentina, FK Ventspils in Latvia and in 2010 he join for Aldosivi in Mar del Plata.
