= Leandro Caballero =

Argentine professional footballer

Personal information
- Full name: Leandro Augusto Caballero
- Date of birth: 13 February 1986 (age 40)
- Place of birth: Pinamar, Argentina
- Height: 1.86 m (6 ft 1 in)
- Position: Defender

Team information
- Current team: UAI Urquiza

Youth career
- 1992–2000: San Vicente de Pinamar
- 2001–2003: Deportivo Pinamar
- Nueva Chicago
- Deportivo Merlo

Senior career*
Years	Team	Apps	(Gls)
2009	Luján de Cuyo	14	(0)
2010–2012	Juventud Unida	41	(3)
2012–2013	Deportivo Maipú	28	(5)
2013–2014	Independiente Rivadavia	44	(1)
2015	Nueva Chicago	8	(0)
2016	Sol de América	15	(0)
2016–2017	Guillermo Brown	16	(0)
2017–2018	UAI Urquiza	26	(0)
2018–2021	Defensores de Belgrano	29	(1)
2021	Deportivo Riestra	8	(0)
2021–	UAI Urquiza	37	(0)
- * Club domestic league appearances and goals as of 17:15, 13 July 2022 (UTC)

Leandro Augusto Caballero (born 13 February 1986) is an Argentine professional footballer who plays as a defender for UAI Urquiza.

== Career ==
Caballero began in the youth of San Vicente de Pinamar in 1992, being on their books until 2001 when he joined Deportivo Pinamar. He also had spells in Nueva Chicago and Deportivo Merlo's academies. His senior career got going with Luján de Cuyo of Torneo Argentino B. In 2010, Caballero signed for Torneo Argentino A's Juventud Unida Universitario. He netted goals against Alumni, Deportivo Maipú and Rivadavia across two seasons. Deportivo Maipú signed him on 30 June 2012. He scored six in thirty-three appearances in 2012–13; he was sent off in his final game versus Santamarina in June 2013.

In 2013, Caballero moved to Independiente Rivadavia. His pro debut came on 13 August versus Gimnasia y Esgrima. After one goal in forty-five matches in all competitions for Independiente Rivadavia, Caballero departed on 12 January 2015 to play for ex-club Nueva Chicago of the Argentine Primera División. He made eight top-flight appearances in the 2015 campaign as the club were relegated to Primera B Nacional. January 2016 saw Caballero leave Argentine football by signing for Paraguayan Primera División side Sol de América. His stay lasted seven months, with Caballero appearing in fifteen fixtures.

He sealed a return to Argentina with Guillermo Brown on 6 July 2016. A further move to third tier UAI Urquiza followed a year later. Defensores de Belgrano became Caballero's ninth senior club in 2018. Having been an unused substitute eight times in the months prior, he made his bow for them on 12 November against Quilmes.

== Career statistics ==
As of 13 December 2018.

Club statistics
Club	Season	League			Cup (Note: Includes the Copa Argentina)		League Cup		Continental		Other		Total	
Club	Season	Division	Apps	Goals	Apps	Goals	Apps	Goals	Apps	Goals	Apps	Goals	Apps	Goals
Luján de Cuyo	2009–10	Torneo Argentino B	14	0	0	0	—		—		0	0	14	0
Deportivo Maipú	2012–13	Torneo Argentino A	28	5	1	0	—		—		4 (Note: Four appearances in the 2012–13 Torneo Argentino A play-offs)	1 (Note: One goal in the 2012–13 Torneo Argentino A play-offs)	33	6
Independiente Rivadavia	2013–14	Primera B Nacional	32	0	1	0	—		—		0	0	33	0
Independiente Rivadavia	2014	Primera B Nacional	12	1	0	0	—		—		0	0	12	1
Independiente Rivadavia	Total		44	1	1	0	—		—		0	0	45	1
Nueva Chicago	2015	Argentine Primera División	8	0	1	0	—		—		0	0	9	0
Sol de América	2016	Paraguayan Primera División	15	0	—		—		—		0	0	15	0
Guillermo Brown	2016–17	Primera B Nacional	16	0	1	0	—		—		0	0	17	0
UAI Urquiza	2017–18	Primera B Metropolitana	21	0	0	0	—		—		5	0	26	0
Defensores de Belgrano	2018–19	Primera B Nacional	1	0	0	0	—		—		0	0	1	0
Career total			147	6	4	0	—		—		9	1	160	7
