= Matías Quiroga (forward) =

Argentine footballer

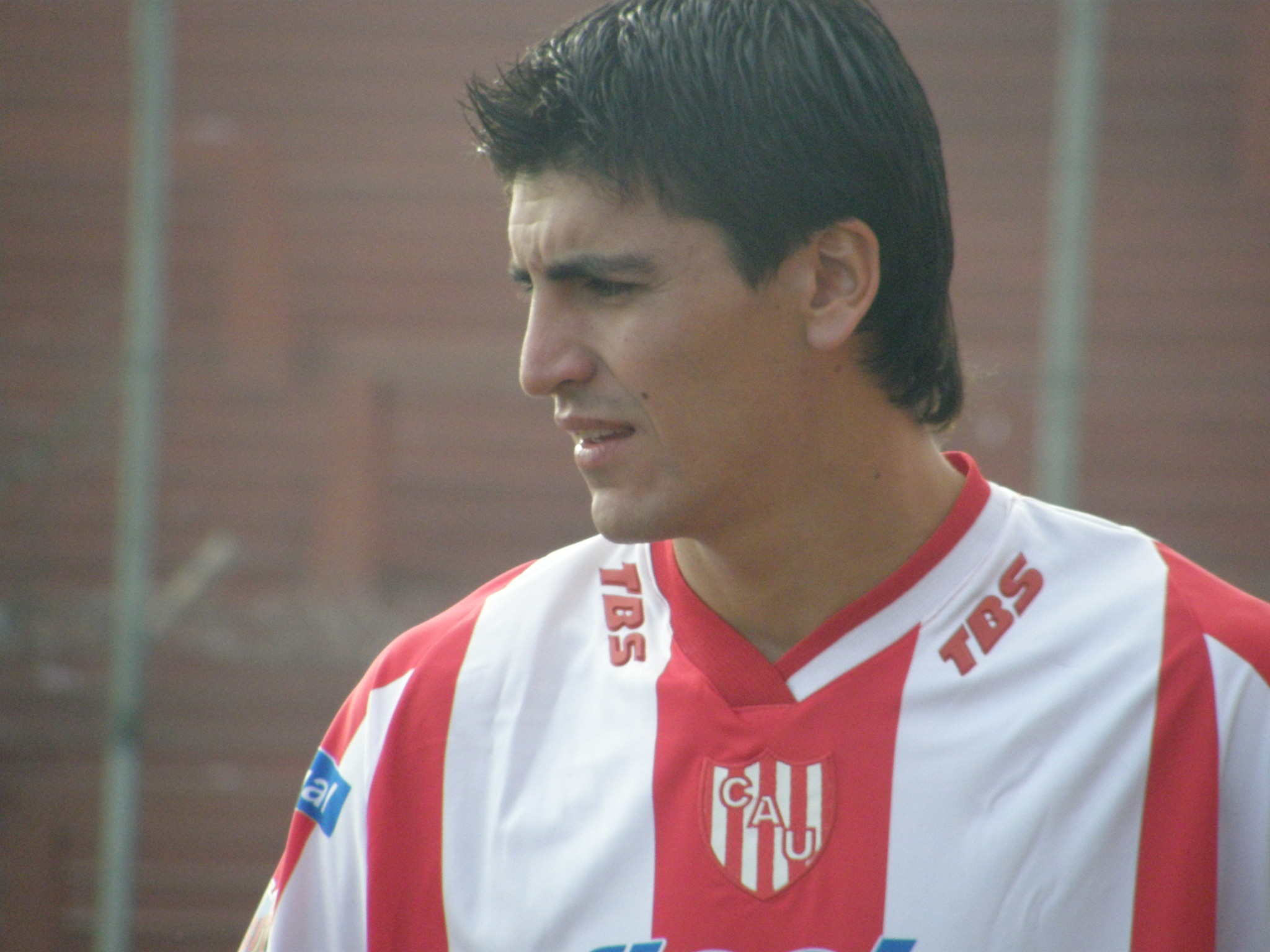
- Matías Quiroga

Personal information
- Full name: Matías Alejandro Quiroga
- Date of birth: April 14, 1986 (age 40)
- Place of birth: San Luis, Argentina
- Position: Forward

Team information
- Current team: Independiente Rivadavia

Youth career
- Juventud Unida

Senior career*
Years	Team	Apps	(Gls)
2004–2009	Juventud Unida	47	(10)
2009–2010	Audax Italiano	26	(1)
2010–2011	Unión de Santa Fe	48	(14)
2012	Patronato	20	(9)
2012–2013	Gimnasia LP	28	(2)
2013–2014	Gimnasia de Jujuy	41	(11)
2014–2018	Patronato	118	(19)
2018–2019	Atlético de Rafaela	21	(7)
2019–2021	Defensores de Belgrano	25	(1)
2021–2022	Independiente Rivadavia	61	(19)
2023	San Martín Tucumán	5	(0)
2024	Chaco For Ever	7	(0)
2024	Paysandú	10	(4)
2024	FADEP		
2025–	Juventud Antoniana		
- * Club domestic league appearances and goals

Matías Alejandro Quiroga (born April 14, 1986, in San Luis, Argentina) is an Argentine footballer currently playing for Juventud Antoniana.
