= Jonathan Osan =

Argentine footballer

Personal information
- Full name: Jonathan Osan
- Date of birth: 5 December 1996 (age 29)
- Place of birth: Garín, Argentina
- Height: 1.82 m (5 ft 11 1/2 in)
- Position: Midfielder

Youth career
- Defensores de Belgrano

Senior career*
Years	Team	Apps	(Gls)
2016–2017	Defensores de Belgrano	2	(0)
- * Club domestic league appearances and goals as of 21:28, 15 December 2018 (UTC)

Jonathan Osan (born 5 December 1996) is an Argentine professional footballer who plays as a midfielder.

== Career ==
Osan's career started with Defensores de Belgrano. He made his pro debut for the club on 24 April 2016 against Deportivo Español, which was his sole appearance in the 2016 Primera B Metropolitana season. In the following campaign, 2016–17, he again featured just once - versus Acassuso in June 2017.

== Career statistics ==
As of 15 December 2018.

Club statistics
Club	Season	League			Cup (Note: Includes the Copa Argentina)		League Cup		Continental		Other		Total	
Club	Season	Division	Apps	Goals	Apps	Goals	Apps	Goals	Apps	Goals	Apps	Goals	Apps	Goals
Defensores de Belgrano	2016	Primera B Metropolitana	1	0	0	0	—		—		0	0	1	0
Defensores de Belgrano	2016–17	Primera B Metropolitana	1	0	0	0	—		—		0	0	1	0
Defensores de Belgrano	2017–18	Primera B Metropolitana	0	0	0	0	—		—		0	0	0	0
Defensores de Belgrano	2018–19	Primera B Nacional	0	0	0	0	—		—		0	0	0	0
Career total			2	0	0	0	—		—		0	0	2	0
