= Maximiliano Ferreira (footballer, born 1989) =

Argentinian association football player

Personal information
- Full name: Maximiliano Nicolás Ferreira
- Date of birth: 10 January 1989 (age 37)
- Place of birth: Olavarría, Argentina
- Height: 1.66 m (5 ft 5 1/2 in)
- Position: Midfielder

Team information
- Current team: Camioneros

Youth career
- 2000–2010: River Plate

Senior career*
Years	Team	Apps	(Gls)
2010–2011	Estudiantes		
2011	San Telmo	2	(0)
2012	Estudiantes		
2012–2018	UAI Urquiza	132	(5)
2015	→ Platense (loan)	25	(1)
2018-2019	Brown de Adrogué	2	(0)
2019–2021	Defensores de Belgrano	21	(0)
2021–2022	Ciudad Bolívar	12	(0)
2022	UAI Urquiza		
2023–	Camioneros	9	(0)
- * Club domestic league appearances and goals as of 11:45, 08 January 2025 (UTC)

Maximiliano Nicolás Ferreira (born 10 January 1989) is an Argentine professional footballer who plays as a midfielder for Camioneros in the Primera B of Argentina.

== Career ==
Ferreira's career started in River Plate's academy, staying for ten years until sealing a move to Torneo Argentino C's Estudiantes. Ferreira joined San Telmo in 2011, which preceded a return to Estudiantes in 2012. Ferreira completed a move to Primera C Metropolitana's UAI Urquiza in 2012. He scored one goal in twenty matches in his first campaign, which ended with the title and subsequent promotion to tier three. Goals against Comunicaciones, Flandria, Barracas Central and Deportivo Morón followed in 2013–14. Ferreira was loaned to Platense in January 2015, remaining for twelve months and scoring once in twenty-six fixtures.

He returned to UAI Urquiza for 2016, prior to departing two years later. On 19 June 2018, after participating in one hundred and thirty-eight games and netting five goals for UAI Urquiza, Ferreira joined Primera B Nacional side Brown. His professional debut for the club arrived on 23 September during a goalless draw with Los Andes.

After passing through Ciudad Bolívar, UAI Urquiza, In 2023 he became a player for Camioneros.

== Career statistics ==
As of 29 November 2018.

Club statistics
Club	Season	League			Cup (Note: Includes the Copa Argentina)		League Cup		Continental		Other		Total	
Club	Season	Division	Apps	Goals	Apps	Goals	Apps	Goals	Apps	Goals	Apps	Goals	Apps	Goals
San Telmo	2011–12	Primera B Metropolitana	2	0	0	0	—		—		0	0	2	0
UAI Urquiza	2012–13	Primera C Metropolitana	19	1	1	0	—		—		0	0	20	1
UAI Urquiza	2013–14	Primera B Metropolitana	32	4	0	0	—		—		0	0	32	4
UAI Urquiza	2014	Primera B Metropolitana	17	0	0	0	—		—		0	0	17	0
UAI Urquiza	2015	Primera B Metropolitana	0	0	0	0	—		—		0	0	0	0
UAI Urquiza	2016	Primera B Metropolitana	14	0	0	0	—		—		0	0	14	0
UAI Urquiza	2016–17	Primera B Metropolitana	22	0	0	0	—		—		0	0	22	0
UAI Urquiza	2017–18	Primera B Metropolitana	28	0	0	0	—		—		5 (Note: Five appearances in the 2017–18 Primera B Metropolitana play-offs)	0	33	0
UAI Urquiza	Total		132	5	1	0	—		—		5	0	138	5
Platense (loan)	2015	Primera B Metropolitana	25	1	0	0	—		—		1 (Note: One appearance in the 2015 Primera B Metropolitana play-offs)	0	26	1
Brown	2018–19	Primera B Nacional	2	0	0	0	—		—		0	0	2	0
Career total			161	6	1	0	—		—		6	0	168	6

== Honours ==
UAI Urquiza

- Primera C Metropolitana: 2012–13
