= Juan Manuel Olivares (footballer) =

Argentine footballer (born 1988)

Personal information
- Full name: Juan Manuel Olivares
- Date of birth: 14 July 1988 (age 38)
- Place of birth: Wilde, Buenos Aires, Argentina
- Height: 1.70 m (5 ft 7 in)
- Position: Midfielder

Team information
- Current team: Deportivo Morón
- Number: 19

Youth career
- Quilmes

Senior career*
Years	Team	Apps	(Gls)
2007–2010	Quilmes	73	(4)
2010	→ Everton (loan)	11	(0)
2010	Deportivo Merlo	8	(0)
2011–2013	Platense	93	(10)
2013–2014	Crucero del Norte	33	(6)
2014	Olimpo	12	(0)
2015	Los Andes	38	(5)
2016	Crucero del Norte	17	(2)
2016–2017	Brown de Adrogué	38	(5)
2017–2018	Platense	26	(1)
2018–2019	Brown de Adrogué	24	(3)
2019–2022	Defensores de Belgrano	93	(19)
2023	Aldosivi	30	(0)
2024–	Deportivo Morón	23	(1)
- * Club domestic league appearances and goals as of 17:43, 4 August 2025 (UTC)

Juan Manuel Olivares (born 14 July 1988) is an Argentine professional footballer who plays as a midfielder for Deportivo Morón of the Primera Nacional in Argentina.

== Teams ==
- (Argentina) Quilmes 2007–2009
- (Chile) Everton 2010
- (Argentina) Deportivo Merlo 2010
- (Argentina) Platense 2011–2013
- (Argentina) Crucero del Norte 2013–2014
- (Argentina) Olimpo 2014
- (Argentina) Los Andes 2015
- (Argentina) Crucero del Norte 2016
- (Argentina) Brown de Adrogué 2016–2017
- (Argentina) Platense 2017–2018
- (Argentina) Brown de Adrogué 2018–2019
- (Argentina) Defensores de Belgrano 2019–2022
- (Argentina) Aldosivi 2023
- (Argentina) Deportivo Morón 2024–
