= Sebastián Soto (footballer, born 1991) =

Argentine footballer (born 1991)

Personal information
- Full name: Sebastián Ezequiel Soto
- Date of birth: 14 June 1991 (age 35)
- Place of birth: Munro, Argentina
- Height: 1.74 m (5 ft 9 in)
- Position: Midfielder

Team information
- Current team: San Miguel

Youth career
- Chacarita Juniors
- Justo José de Urquiza
- Argentinos Juniors
- Excursionistas

Senior career*
Years	Team	Apps	(Gls)
2009–2013	Excursionistas	94	(2)
2013–2019	Deportivo Riestra	156	(28)
2019–2021	Defensores de Belgrano	9	(0)
2021	Deportivo Riestra	8	(0)
2022–	San Miguel	9	(0)
- * Club domestic league appearances and goals as of 19:24, 16 July 2022 (UTC)

Sebastián Ezequiel Soto (born 14 June 1991) is an Argentine professional footballer who plays as a midfielder for San Miguel.

== Career ==
Soto had youth spells with Chacarita Juniors, Justo José de Urquiza, Argentinos Juniors and Excursionistas. He made eight appearances for the latter in Primera C Metropolitana from 2009, which preceded a further eighty-eight arriving across the following three seasons. In 2013, Soto agreed to join Primera D Metropolitana's Deportivo Riestra. Fourteen goals came in forty-seven fixtures in his opening two campaigns as the club rose from tier five to Primera B Metropolitana for 2015. He netted against Platense, Deportivo Morón, Atlanta, Colegiales and Talleres across two years at that level. They won 2016–17 promotion to Primera B Nacional.

On 30 May 2019, after a season back in tier three with Deportivo Riestra, Soto agreed a move away for 2019–20 after penning terms with Defensores de Belgrano of Primera B Nacional.

== Career statistics ==
As of 4 June 2019.

Appearances and goals by club, season and competition
Club	Season	League			Cup		League Cup		Continental		Other		Total	
Club	Season	Division	Apps	Goals	Apps	Goals	Apps	Goals	Apps	Goals	Apps	Goals	Apps	Goals
Excursionistas	2009–10	Primera C Metropolitana	8	0	0	0	—		—		0	0	8	0
Excursionistas	2010–11	Primera C Metropolitana	38	1	0	0	—		—		0	0	38	1
Excursionistas	2011–12	Primera C Metropolitana	27	1	1	0	—		—		0	0	28	1
Excursionistas	2012–13	Primera C Metropolitana	21	0	1	0	—		—		0	0	22	0
Excursionistas	Total		94	2	2	0	—		—		0	0	96	2
Deportivo Riestra	2013–14	Primera D Metropolitana	26	11	0	0	—		—		0	0	26	11
Deportivo Riestra	2014	Primera C Metropolitana	21	3	0	0	—		—		0	0	21	3
Deportivo Riestra	2015	Primera B Metropolitana	33	2	3	0	—		—		0	0	36	2
Deportivo Riestra	2016	Primera B Metropolitana	10	0	0	0	—		—		0	0	10	0
Deportivo Riestra	2016–17	Primera B Metropolitana	22	3	1	0	—		—		4 (Note: Appearance(s) in the Primera B Metropolitana play-offs)	0	27	3
Deportivo Riestra	2017–18	Primera B Nacional	20	6	1	0	—		—		0	0	21	6
Deportivo Riestra	2018–19	Primera B Metropolitana	17	0	0	0	—		—		0	0	17	0
Deportivo Riestra	Total		149	25	5	0	—		—		4	0	158	25
Career total			243	27	7	0	—		—		4	0	254	27
