= Gonzalo Aquilino =

Argentine professional footballer

Personal information
- Full name: Gonzalo Aquilino Pintos
- Date of birth: 20 February 2000 (age 26)
- Place of birth: Argentina
- Position: Forward

Team information
- Current team: Defensores de Belgrano

Youth career
- Defensores de Belgrano

Senior career*
Years	Team	Apps	(Gls)
2017–	Defensores de Belgrano	45	(4)
2022	→ Deportivo Merlo (loan)	10	(0)
2023	→ Sol de América Formosa (loan)	21	(3)
2025	→ San Telmo (loan)	5	(0)
- * Club domestic league appearances and goals as of 18:01, 25 April 2026 (UTC)

Gonzalo Aquilino Pintos (born 20 February 2000) is an Argentine professional footballer who plays as a forward for Defensores de Belgrano.

== Career ==
Aquilino started his career with Primera B Metropolitana's Defensores de Belgrano. He was moved into their first-team in October 2017 by Fabián Nardozza, who selected the forward for his professional debut on 15 October 2017 during a defeat to San Telmo. In his next appearance, three days later, he scored his first senior goal as Defensores de Belgrano beat Colegiales 1–0. He was selected for the final time in 2017–18 in March 2018 for the return fixture with San Telmo, receiving a red card three minutes after being substituted on for Gonzalo Jaque; in a season which the club ended with promotion to Primera B Nacional. Ahead of the 2022 season, Aquilino was loaned out to Primera B Metropolitana side Deportivo Merlo until the end of the year.

== Career statistics ==
As of 16 December 2018.

Club statistics
Club	Season	League			Cup (Note: Includes the Copa Argentina)		League Cup		Continental		Other		Total	
Club	Season	Division	Apps	Goals	Apps	Goals	Apps	Goals	Apps	Goals	Apps	Goals	Apps	Goals
Defensores de Belgrano	2017–18	Primera B Metropolitana	3	1	0	0	—		—		0	0	3	1
Defensores de Belgrano	2018–19	Primera B Nacional	0	0	0	0	—		—		0	0	0	0
Career total			3	1	0	0	—		—		0	0	3	1
