= Francisco Martínez (footballer, born 1990) =

Argentine footballer

Personal information
- Full name: Francisco Alfredo Martínez
- Date of birth: 4 June 1990 (age 36)
- Place of birth: Ushuaia, Argentina
- Height: 1.86 m (6 ft 1 in)
- Positions: Left-back; centre-back

Team information
- Current team: Flandria

Youth career
- Los Cuervos del Fin del Mundo

Senior career*
Years	Team	Apps	(Gls)
2011–2013	All Boys	24	(0)
2013–2014	Atlético de Rafaela	4	(0)
2014–2015	Douglas Haig	56	(2)
2016–2017	Los Andes	44	(2)
2017–2018	Flandria	7	(0)
2018–2019	Defensores de Belgrano	8	(0)
2019–2021	Tristán Suárez	40	(1)
2022–	Flandria	6	(0)
- * Club domestic league appearances and goals as of 17:18, 13 July 2022 (UTC)

Francisco Alfredo Martínez (born 4 June 1990) is an Argentine professional footballer who plays as a left-back or centre-back for Flandria.

== Career ==
Martínez played in the academy of Los Cuervos del Fin del Mundo. All Boys were Martínez's first senior club. He made his professional debut on 6 August 2011 during an Argentine Primera División draw with Belgrano. Ahead of 2013–14, with Martínez having made twenty-six appearances for All Boys, he made a move to fellow top-flight side Atlético de Rafaela. He was selected in four fixtures in 2013–14. On 2 July 2014, Martínez signed for Douglas Haig of Primera B Nacional. He netted his first professional goal after fifteen games in the following November versus Guaraní Antonio Franco as they lost 3–1 in Posadas.

He remained with the club for 2014 and 2015, featuring a total of fifty-eight times along with two goals. In January 2016, Martínez agreed to sign for fellow second tier team Los Andes. Two goals in forty-four matches subsequently occurred for Los Andes across two seasons. Martínez joined Flandria for ten months from September 2017 to June 2018, when the defender completed a move to Defensores de Belgrano.

== Career statistics ==
As of 14 December 2018.

Club statistics
Club	Season	League			Cup (Note: Includes the Copa Argentina)		League Cup		Continental		Other		Total	
Club	Season	Division	Apps	Goals	Apps	Goals	Apps	Goals	Apps	Goals	Apps	Goals	Apps	Goals
All Boys	2011–12	Primera División	10	0	1	0	—		—		0	0	11	0
All Boys	2012–13	Primera División	14	0	1	0	—		—		0	0	15	0
All Boys	Total		24	0	2	0	—		—		0	0	26	0
Atlético de Rafaela	2013–14	Primera División	4	0	0	0	—		—		0	0	4	0
Douglas Haig	2014	Primera B Nacional	18	1	1	0	—		—		0	0	19	1
Douglas Haig	2015	Primera B Nacional	38	1	1	0	—		—		0	0	39	1
Douglas Haig	Total		56	2	2	0	—		—		0	0	58	2
Los Andes	2016	Primera B Nacional	20	0	0	0	—		—		0	0	20	0
Los Andes	2016–17	Primera B Nacional	24	2	0	0	—		—		0	0	24	2
Los Andes	Total		44	2	0	0	—		—		0	0	44	2
Flandria	2017–18	Primera B Nacional	7	0	0	0	—		—		0	0	7	0
Defensores de Belgrano	2018–19	Primera B Nacional	0	0	0	0	—		—		0	0	0	0
Career total			135	4	4	0	—		—		0	0	139	4
