= Guillermo Vernetti =

Argentine footballer

Personal information
- Full name: Guillermo Andrés Vernetti
- Date of birth: 17 April 1993 (age 33)
- Place of birth: Rosario, Argentina
- Height: 1.82 m (5 ft 11 1/2 in)
- Position: Attacking midfielder

Team information
- Current team: Santamarina

Senior career*
Years	Team	Apps	(Gls)
2014–2018	Ferro Carril Oeste	111	(14)
2018–2019	Mitre	7	(0)
2019–2020	Defensores de Belgrano	9	(0)
2021	Isidro Metapán	18	(1)
2021–	Santamarina	18	(0)
- * Club domestic league appearances and goals as of 20:29, 2 August 2022 (UTC)

Guillermo Andrés Vernetti (born 17 April 1993) is an Argentine professional footballer who plays as an attacking midfielder for Santamarina.

== Career ==
Vernetti started his career with Ferro Carril Oeste. He made his professional debut on 8 June 2014 in a Primera B Nacional win over Brown. Vernetti scored two goals during a fixture with Atlético Paraná in February 2015, which were the first of a subsequent thirteen goals across the six seasons the midfielder spent with Ferro Carril Oeste; most notably netting seven during 2016–17. On 23 August 2018, Vernetti joined fellow Primera B Nacional side Mitre. Eight appearances followed.

July 2019 saw Vernetti head across the second tier to Defensores de Belgrano. He debuted off the bench during a goalless draw away to Gimnasia y Esgrima on 18 August. He'd appear eight further times for the club, though just one of which was as a starter. In January 2021, having not featured in the shortened 2020 campaign, Vernetti went to El Salvador with Primera División outfit Isidro Metapán.

== Career statistics ==
As of 30 January 2021.

Club statistics
Club	Season	League			Cup		League Cup		Continental		Other		Total	
Club	Season	Division	Apps	Goals	Apps	Goals	Apps	Goals	Apps	Goals	Apps	Goals	Apps	Goals
Ferro Carril Oeste	2013–14	Primera B Nacional	1	0	0	0	—		—		0	0	1	0
Ferro Carril Oeste	2014	Primera B Nacional	18	0	1	0	—		—		0	0	19	0
Ferro Carril Oeste	2015	Primera B Nacional	40	4	3	0	—		—		2 (Note: Appearance(s) in the Primera B Nacional play-offs)	1	45	5
Ferro Carril Oeste	2016	Primera B Nacional	15	2	1	0	—		—		0	0	16	2
Ferro Carril Oeste	2016–17	Primera B Nacional	33	7	1	0	—		—		0	0	34	7
Ferro Carril Oeste	2017–18	Primera B Nacional	4	1	0	0	—		—		0	0	4	1
Ferro Carril Oeste	Total		111	14	6	0	—		—		2	1	119	15
Mitre	2018–19	Primera B Nacional	7	0	1	0	—		—		0	0	8	0
Defensores de Belgrano	2019–20	Primera B Nacional	9	0	0	0	—		—		0	0	9	0
Defensores de Belgrano	2020	Primera B Nacional	0	0	0	0	—		—		0	0	0	0
Defensores de Belgrano	Total		9	0	0	0	—		—		0	0	9	0
Isidro Metapán	2020–21	Primera División	0	0	0	0	—		—		0	0	0	0
Career total			127	14	7	0	—		—		2	1	136	15
