= Marcelo Goux =

Argentine footballer

Personal information
- Full name: Marcelo Jesús Goux
- Date of birth: September 21, 1975 (age 51)
- Place of birth: Lanús, Argentina
- Height: 1.85 m (6 ft 1 in)
- Position: Centre back

Senior career*
Years	Team	Apps	(Gls)
1996	Huracán	2	(0)
1996–1997	Nacional		
1997–1999	Colón	24	(1)
2000–2001	Belgrano	29	(3)
2002–2006	Gimnasia La Plata	162	(7)
2007–2011	Colón	102	(6)
2011–2012	Gimnasia La Plata	30	(2)

Managerial career
- 2013: Colón (Assistant)
- 2015–2016: Belgrano de Sá Pereira
- 2016: Belgrano (Assistant)
- 2019: Colón (Interim)
- 2019–2020: Rosario Central (Assistant)
- 2020–2022: Atlas (Assistant)
- 2023: UANL (Assistant)
- 2023: Mexico (Assistant)
- 2024–2025: Valladolid (Assistant)
- 2025: Talleres (Assistant)
- 2025–2026: Atlas (Assistant)
- * Club domestic league appearances and goals as of 22:08, 6 August 2011 (UTC)

Marcelo Jesús Goux (born 21 September 1975 in Lanús) is an Argentine football manager and former player who is currently the assistant coach of La Liga side Valladolid.

== Career ==
Goux started his professional playing career with Huracán on 11 August 1996 in a 2–1 defeat to Ferro Carril Oeste. After a brief stint with Club Nacional de Football of Uruguay he returned to Argentina to play for Colón de Santa Fe.

In 2000, he joined Belgrano de Córdoba and in 2002 he joined Gimnasia La Plata where he played 167 league games, he left the club after claims that some Gimnasia fans had made death threats against their own players in order to make them lose a game in order to damage the title chances of local rival Estudiantes de La Plata. He rejoined Colón de Santa Fe in 2007. He retired from active football on June 30, 2012.

== Personal ==
His younger brother, Luciano Goux is also a football player.
