= Daniel Denot =

Argentine footballer

Personal information
- Full name: Daniel Gerardo Denot
- Date of birth: 11 November 1993 (age 33)
- Place of birth: Mar del Plata, Argentina
- Height: 1.76 m (5 ft 9 in)
- Position: Midfielder

Team information
- Current team: Vélez CF
- Number: 7

Senior career*
| Years | Team | Apps | (Gls) |
| 2015 | River Plate B | | |
| 2015 | Carabobo | 11 | (0) |
| 2016–2018 | Varzim | 6 | (0) |
| 2017–2018 | → Salgueiros (loan) | 15 | (1) |
| 2018–2019 | Salgueiros | 23 | (3) |
| 2019– | Vélez CF | 8 | (0) |
- * Club domestic league appearances and goals as of 15:14, 25 March 2020 (UTC)

Daniel Gerardo Denot (born 11 November 1993) is an Argentine professional footballer who plays as a midfielder for Vélez CF.

== Career ==
Denot made his professional debut in the Venezuelan Primera División for Carabobo on 12 July 2015 in a game against Petare.
