= Diego Medina (footballer, born 1991) =

Argentine footballer

Personal information
- Full name: Diego Leonardo Medina
- Date of birth: 16 December 1991 (age 34)
- Place of birth: San Isidro, Argentina
- Height: 1.75 m (5 ft 9 in)
- Position: Forward

Team information
- Current team: Estudiantes SL

Senior career*
| Years | Team | Apps | (Gls) |
| 2009–2018 | Deportivo Armenio | 108 | (10) |
| 2012–2013 | → San Telmo (loan) | 15 | (0) |
| 2015 | → Ferro Carril Oeste (loan) | 23 | (1) |
| 2016 | → Almagro (loan) | 18 | (5) |
| 2016–2017 | → Instituto (loan) | 25 | (1) |
| 2017–2018 | → Flandria (loan) | 20 | (2) |
| 2018–2019 | Defensores de Belgrano | 15 | (0) |
| 2019–2021 | Deportivo Armenio | 37 | (7) |
| 2022– | Estudiantes SL | 16 | (1) |
- * Club domestic league appearances and goals as of 07:31, 20 August 2022 (UTC)

Diego Leonardo Medina (born 16 December 1991) is an Argentine professional footballer who plays as a forward for Estudiantes San Luis.

== Career ==
Medina started his career with Deportivo Armenio. He was with the club between 2009 and 2018, netting ten goals in one hundred and eight Primera B Metropolitana matches. In that time, he was loaned out five times, firstly joining San Telmo for 2012–13, making fifteen appearances as they were relegated. Primera B Nacional side Ferro Carril Oeste signed Medina on loan in January 2015. He scored his first goal on 22 September against Gimnasia y Esgrima. Medina spent the first half of 2016 with Almagro, scoring goals versus Boca Unidos, Atlético Paraná, Douglas Haig, Brown and Juventud Unida Universitario.

For the rest of 2016, Medina joined fellow second tier team Instituto on loan. One goal in twenty-five league fixtures followed, as Instituto finished sixth. His final loan away from his parent club was confirmed on 15 August 2017, with the forward signing for Flandria. He suffered his second career relegation, after they placed twenty-fourth with Medina playing twenty times and scoring twice. In July 2018, Medina departed Deportivo Armenio permanently after he agreed to a move to Defensores de Belgrano of Primera B Nacional. He made his debut on 24 July during a 4–1 Copa Argentina defeat to Atlético de Rafaela.

== Career statistics ==
As of 17 December 2018.

Club statistics
| Club | Season | League | | | Cup (Note: Includes the Copa Argentina) | | League Cup | | Continental | | Other | | Total | |
| Club | Season | Division | Apps | Goals | Apps | Goals | Apps | Goals | Apps | Goals | Apps | Goals | Apps | Goals |
|---|---|---|---|---|---|---|---|---|---|---|---|---|---|---|
| Deportivo Armenio | 2013–14 | Primera B Metropolitana | 36 | 2 | 1 | 0 | — | | — | | 0 | 0 | 37 | 2 |
| Deportivo Armenio | 2014 | Primera B Metropolitana | 16 | 3 | 1 | 0 | — | | — | | 0 | 0 | 17 | 3 |
| Deportivo Armenio | Total | | 52 | 5 | 2 | 0 | — | | — | | 0 | 0 | 54 | 5 |
| San Telmo (loan) | 2012–13 | Primera B Metropolitana | 15 | 0 | 1 | 0 | — | | — | | 0 | 0 | 16 | 0 |
| Ferro Carril Oeste (loan) | 2015 | Primera B Nacional | 23 | 1 | 0 | 0 | — | | — | | 1 (Note: One appearance in the 2015 Primera B Nacional play-offs) | 0 | 24 | 1 |
| Almagro (loan) | 2016 | Primera B Nacional | 18 | 5 | 1 | 0 | — | | — | | 0 | 0 | 19 | 5 |
| Instituto (loan) | 2016–17 | Primera B Nacional | 25 | 1 | 0 | 0 | — | | — | | 0 | 0 | 25 | 1 |
| Flandria (loan) | 2017–18 | Primera B Nacional | 20 | 2 | 1 | 0 | — | | — | | 0 | 0 | 21 | 2 |
| Defensores de Belgrano | 2018–19 | Primera B Nacional | 10 | 0 | 1 | 0 | — | | — | | 0 | 0 | 11 | 0 |
| Career total | | | 163 | 14 | 6 | 0 | — | | — | | 1 | 0 | 170 | 14 |
