= Maximiliano Ferreira (footballer, born 1999) =

Uruguayan footballer

Personal information
- Full name: Denis Maximiliano Ferreira Fernández
- Date of birth: 15 August 1999 (age 27)
- Place of birth: Montevideo, Uruguay
- Position: Midfielder

Team information
- Current team: Cerrito

Senior career*
Years	Team	Apps	(Gls)
2018–	Cerrito	3	(0)
- * Club domestic league appearances and goals as of 02:27, 29 November 2018 (UTC)

Denis Maximiliano Ferreira Fernández (born 15 August 1999) is a Uruguayan professional footballer who plays as a midfielder for Cerrito.

== Career ==
Ferreira began his career with Cerrito, appearing for the first-team during the 2018 Uruguayan Segunda División season. He made his professional debut on 15 September during an away defeat to Plaza Colonia, which was one of three appearances in that campaign as Cerrito finished fourth.

== Career statistics ==
As of 29 November 2018.

Club statistics
Club	Season	League			Cup		League Cup		Continental		Other		Total	
Club	Season	Division	Apps	Goals	Apps	Goals	Apps	Goals	Apps	Goals	Apps	Goals	Apps	Goals
Cerrito	2018	Segunda División	3	0	—		—		—		0	0	3	0
Career total			3	0	—		—		—		0	0	3	0
