= Christian Moreno =

Argentine footballer (born 1996)

Personal information
- Full name: Christian Damián Moreno
- Date of birth: 27 April 1996 (age 30)
- Place of birth: Buenos Aires, Argentina
- Height: 1.87 m (6 ft 2 in)
- Position: Centre-back

Team information
- Current team: Cobresal
- Number: 18

Youth career
- Boca Juniors

Senior career*
Years	Team	Apps	(Gls)
2016–2018	Boca Juniors	0	(0)
2016–2017	→ Defensa y Justicia (loan)	0	(0)
2017–2018	→ Defensores de Belgrano (loan)	10	(0)
2018–2019	Defensores de Belgrano	10	(0)
2019–2021	Acassuso	24	(0)
2021	Deportivo Armenio	16	(0)
2022–2023	Almirante Brown	39	(0)
2024	Puerto Cabello	17	(1)
2025–	Cobresal	39	(1)
- * Club domestic league appearances and goals as of 2 August 2026

Christian Damián Moreno (born 27 April 1996) is an Argentine professional footballer who plays as a centre-back for Chilean club Cobresal.

== Career ==
Moreno started with Argentine Primera División side Boca Juniors. He was promoted to their first-team by manager Guillermo Barros Schelotto during the 2016 campaign, though he failed to feature but was an unused substitute for a Copa Libertadores tie with Deportivo Cali and for Primera División fixtures with Aldosivi, Argentinos Juniors, Huracán and Estudiantes. On 28 July 2016, Moreno was loaned to fellow Primera División team Defensa y Justicia. He returned twelve months later after no appearances. Defensores de Belgrano of Primera B Metropolitana signed Moreno on loan in 2017.

He made his senior debut with the club on 21 February 2018 during a score draw at home to Talleres, in a season which ended with promotion to the 2018–19 Primera B Nacional. Defensores de Belgrano subsequently completed the permanent signing of Moreno in the following June.

In 2024, Moreno played for Venezuelan club Academia Puerto Cabello. The next year, he moved to Chile and joined Cobresal.

== Career statistics ==
As of 15 December 2018.

Club statistics
Club	Season	League			Cup (Note: Includes the Copa Argentina)		League Cup		Continental (Note: Includes the Copa Libertadores and Copa Sudamericana)		Other		Total	
Club	Season	Division	Apps	Goals	Apps	Goals	Apps	Goals	Apps	Goals	Apps	Goals	Apps	Goals
Boca Juniors	2016	Primera División	0	0	0	0	—		0	0	0	0	0	0
Boca Juniors	2016–17	Primera División	0	0	0	0	—		0	0	0	0	0	0
Boca Juniors	2017–18	Primera División	0	0	0	0	—		0	0	0	0	0	0
Boca Juniors	Total		0	0	0	0	—		0	0	0	0	0	0
Defensa y Justicia (loan)	2016–17	Primera División	0	0	0	0	—		0	0	0	0	0	0
Defensores de Belgrano (loan)	2017–18	Primera B Metropolitana	6	0	0	0	—		—		4 (Note: Four appearances in the 2017–18 Primera B Metropolitana play-offs)	0	10	0
Defensores de Belgrano	2018–19	Primera B Nacional	7	0	1	0	—		—		0	0	8	0
Defensores de Belgrano	Total		13	0	1	0	—		—		4	0	18	0
Career total			13	0	1	0	—		0	0	4	0	18	0
