= Ezequiel Aguirre =

Argentine footballer

Personal information
- Full name: Ezequiel Lucas Aguirre
- Date of birth: 10 January 1992 (age 34)
- Place of birth: Rosario, Argentina
- Height: 1.62 m (5 ft 4 in)
- Position: Winger

Team information
- Current team: Defensores de Belgrano

Youth career
- River Plate

Senior career*
Years	Team	Apps	(Gls)
2013–2014	River Plate	0	(0)
2013–2014	→ Defensores (loan)	26	(2)
2015–2021	Defensores de Belgrano	135	(26)
2021	Olimpia	12	(2)
2022	Santa Fe	9	(0)
2022–	Defensores de Belgrano	128	(26)
- * Club domestic league appearances and goals as of 18:00, 25 April 2026 (UTC)

Ezequiel Lucas Aguirre (born 10 January 1992) is an Argentine professional footballer who plays as a winger for Defensores de Belgrano.

== Career ==
Aguirre started out in the youth of River Plate, appearing at the 2012 U-20 Copa Libertadores by making five appearances and scoring once as they won the competition. In July 2013, Aguirre joined Defensores de Belgrano on loan. He made his professional debut on 13 August 2013 during a goalless draw with Los Andes, prior to netting his first goal in his next appearance against Villa Dálmine on 10 September as they suffered eventual relegation to Primera C Metropolitana. He returned to River Plate in June 2014, before departing permanently to Defensores de Belgrano in the following January.

After four seasons back with Defensores de Belgrano, with Aguirre having scored sixteen goals across one hundred and eight fixtures in the process, they won promotion in 2017–18 to Primera B Nacional. His first goal in the second tier came in a one-nil win over Santamarina on 16 September 2018. Aguirre left the club at the end of the 2020 season, having made one hundred and forty-seven appearances and scored twenty-six goals in six years as a permanent player. February 2021 saw Aguirre head abroad to Honduras to join Olimpia. He scored his first goal on 11 March versus Real de Minas.

== Career statistics ==
As of 12 March 2021.

Club statistics
Club	Season	League			Cup		League Cup		Continental		Other		Total	
Club	Season	Division	Apps	Goals	Apps	Goals	Apps	Goals	Apps	Goals	Apps	Goals	Apps	Goals
River Plate	2013–14	Primera División	0	0	0	0	—		0	0	0	0	0	0
River Plate	2014	Primera División	0	0	0	0	—		0	0	0	0	0	0
River Plate	Total		0	0	0	0	—		0	0	0	0	0	0
Defensores de Belgrano (loan)	2013–14	Primera B Metropolitana	26	2	1	1	—		—		0	0	27	3
Defensores de Belgrano	2015	Primera B Metropolitana	27	2	1	0	—		—		1 (Note: Appearance(s) in the Primera B Metropolitana play-offs)	0	29	2
Defensores de Belgrano	2016	Primera B Metropolitana	11	1	0	0	—		—		0	0	11	1
Defensores de Belgrano	2016–17	Primera B Metropolitana	29	7	3	0	—		—		1	0	33	7
Defensores de Belgrano	2017–18	Primera B Metropolitana	30	6	0	0	—		—		5	0	35	6
Defensores de Belgrano	2018–19	Primera B Nacional	12	5	1	0	—		—		0	0	13	5
Defensores de Belgrano	2019–20	Primera B Nacional	17	4	0	0	—		—		0	0	17	4
Defensores de Belgrano	2020	Primera B Nacional	9	1	0	0	—		—		0	0	9	1
Defensores de Belgrano	Total		161	28	6	1	—		0	0	7	0	174	29
Olimpia	2020–21	Liga Nacional	4	1	0	0	—		0	0	0	0	4	1
Career total			165	29	6	1	—		0	0	7	0	178	30

== Honours ==
River Plate

- U-20 Copa Libertadores: 2012
