= Luciano Goux =

Argentine footballer

Personal information
- Full name: Luciano Sebastián Goux
- Date of birth: January 27, 1980 (age 46)
- Place of birth: Lanús, Argentina
- Height: 1.90 m (6 ft 3 in)
- Position: Centre-back

Team information
- Current team: Defensores de Belgrano

Senior career*
Years	Team	Apps	(Gls)
2000–2002	Atlanta	41	(2)
2002–2003	Sarmiento	20	(0)
2003–2004	Perak FA	27	(2)
2004–2005	Deportivo Laferrere	24	(3)
2006–2009	Estudiantes BA	80	(5)
2009–2011	Tristán Suárez	44	(2)
2011–2012	Defensa y Justicia	14	(0)
2012–2013	Everton Viña del Mar	16	(2)
2013–	Defensores de Belgrano	235	(20)
- * Club domestic league appearances and goals as of 16:33, 12 July 2022 (UTC)

Luciano Sebastián Goux (born 27 January 1980) is an Argentinian football player, who plays for Defensores de Belgrano.

== Career ==
He played the majority of his football in his native Argentina, with a stint in Malaysia in between. He played for Malaysian team Perak FA in the 2004 Super League Malaysia season, and helped Perak to win that year's Malaysia FA Cup, scoring in the final.

He played for Chilean team Everton de Viña del Mar in 2012–2013, before joining his current club Defensores de Belgrano in 2013.

== Personal ==
He is the younger brother of Marcelo Goux, also a footballer.
