= Leandro Martínez Montagnoli =

Argentine footballer

Personal information
- Full name: Leandro Matías Martínez Montagnoli
- Date of birth: 21 April 1987 (age 39)
- Place of birth: Buenos Aires, Argentina
- Height: 1.87 m (6 ft 2 in)
- Position: Defender

Team information
- Current team: Colegiales

Senior career*
Years	Team	Apps	(Gls)
2008–2011	Defensores de Belgrano		
2011–2014	Ferro Carril Oeste	55	(0)
2014	Estudiantes de Buenos Aires	18	(0)
2015	Atlanta	30	(2)
2016	Colegiales	19	(0)
2016–2017	Tampico Madero	25	(0)
2017–2021	Defensores de Belgrano	90	(9)
2021	Mitre	11	(0)
2021–2022	All Boys	46	(1)
2023	Tristán Suárez	31	(2)
2024	Defensores de Belgrano	11	(0)
2024	Cooper	9	(1)
2025–	Colegiales	29	(3)
- * Club domestic league appearances and goals as of 17:19, 25 April 2026 (UTC)

Leandro Matías Martínez Montagnoli (born April 21, 1987) is an Argentine footballer who currently plays for Colegiales.
