= Nicolás Álvarez (footballer) =

Argentine footballer

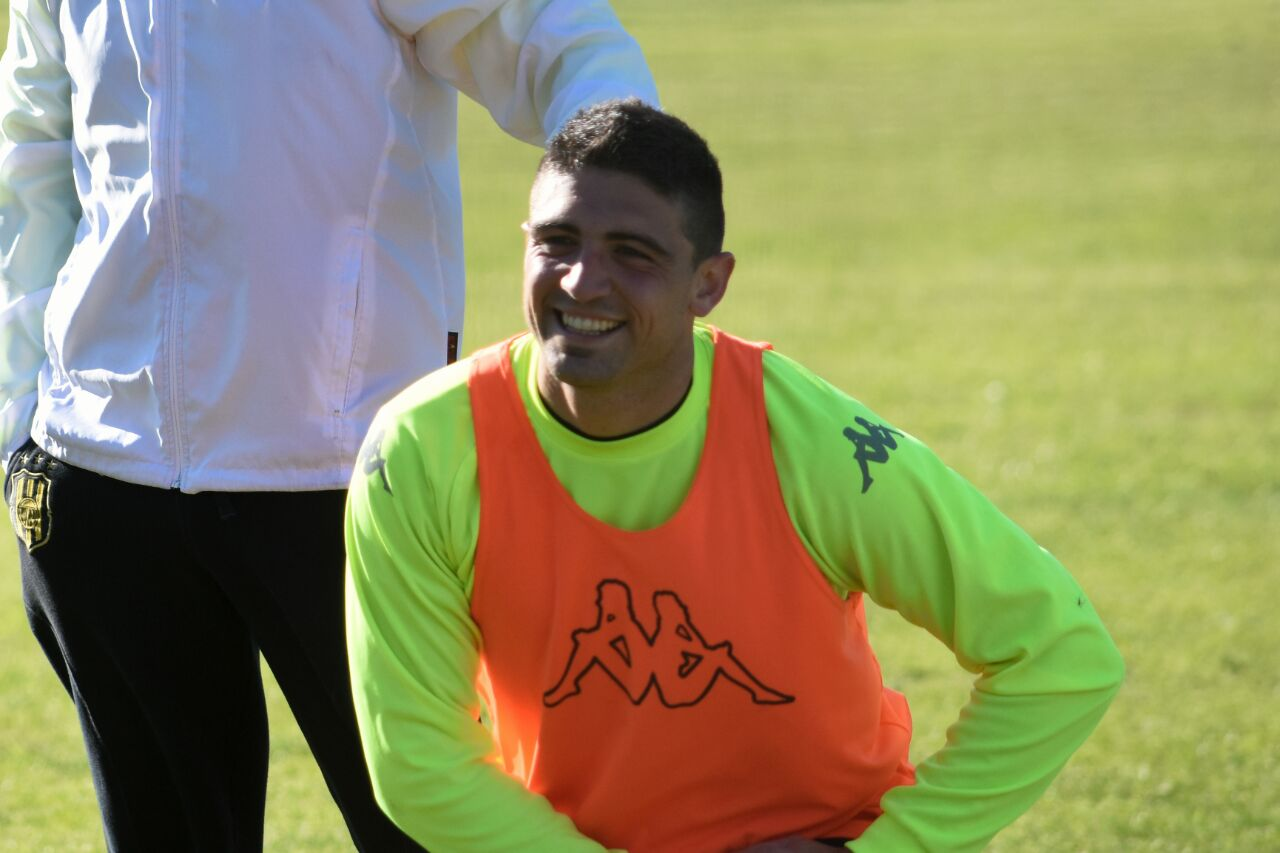

Personal information
- Full name: Nicolás Ariel Álvarez
- Date of birth: 22 January 1990 (age 36)
- Place of birth: San Martín, Argentina
- Height: 1.76 m (5 ft 9 1/2 in)
- Position: Right-back

Team information
- Current team: Colegiales

Youth career
- Estudiantes BA

Senior career*
Years	Team	Apps	(Gls)
2012–2015	Estudiantes BA	86	(2)
2015–2016	Villa Dálmine	38	(2)
2016–2017	Olimpo	4	(0)
2017–2018	Los Andes	18	(0)
2018–2019	Chacarita Juniors	12	(0)
2019–2022	Defensores de Belgrano	93	(0)
2023–2024	Tristán Suárez	44	(0)
2025–	Colegiales	6	(0)
- * Club domestic league appearances and goals as of 17:31, 22 July 2025 (UTC)

Nicolás Ariel Álvarez (born 22 January 1990) is an Argentine professional footballer who plays as a right-back for Colegiales.

== Career ==
Estudiantes of Primera B Metropolitana became Álvarez's first senior club in 2012, making his debut on 17 September in a goalless draw with Villa Dálmine. In his sixty-third appearance for the club, in 2014, Álvarez scored his first goal in a 3–1 win over Almirante Brown. In total, he scored two goals in one hundred and one appearances in three years with Estudiantes. In June 2015, Álvarez joined Primera B Nacional team Villa Dálmine. Thirty-eight appearances and two goals followed in two seasons. On 24 July 2016, Argentine Primera División side Olimpo signed Álvarez. He made a total of four appearances for Olimpo during 2016–17.

In August 2017, Álvarez agreed to sign for Los Andes in Primera B Nacional. His debut arrived during a 0–0 draw versus Deportivo Morón on 15 September. In total, Álvarez made eighteen appearances for Los Andes. On 5 June 2018, Álvarez joined Chacarita Juniors.

== Career statistics ==
As of 7 September 2018.

Club statistics
Club	Season	League			Cup (Note: Includes the Copa Argentina)		League Cup		Continental		Other (Note: Includes the Primera B Metropolitana play-offs)		Total	
Club	Season	Division	Apps	Goals	Apps	Goals	Apps	Goals	Apps	Goals	Apps	Goals	Apps	Goals
Estudiantes	2012–13	Primera B Metropolitana	21	0	4	0	—		—		0	0	25	0
Estudiantes	2013–14	Primera B Metropolitana	34	0	5	0	—		—		0	0	39	0
Estudiantes	2014	Primera B Metropolitana	14	1	3	0	—		—		1 (Note: One appearance in 2014 Primera B Metropolitana play-offs)	0	18	1
Estudiantes	2015	Primera B Metropolitana	17	1	2	0	—		—		0	0	19	1
Estudiantes	Total		86	2	14	0	—		—		1	0	101	2
Villa Dálmine	2015	Primera B Nacional	20	1	0	0	—		—		0	0	20	1
Villa Dálmine	2016	Primera B Nacional	18	1	0	0	—		—		0	0	18	1
Villa Dálmine	Total		38	2	0	0	—		—		0	0	38	2
Olimpo	2016–17	Primera División	4	0	0	0	—		—		0	0	4	0
Los Andes	2017–18	Primera B Nacional	18	0	0	0	—		—		0	0	18	0
Chacarita Juniors	2018–19	Primera B Nacional	0	0	0	0	—		—		0	0	0	0
Career total			146	4	14	0	—		—		1	0	161	4
