= Defensores de Belgrano =

- Full name: Club Atlético Defensores de Belgrano
- Nicknames: Defe; El Dragón (The Dragon)
- Founded: 25 May 1906; 120 years ago
- Ground: Estadio Juan Pasquale, Buenos Aires
- Capacity: 9,000
- Chairman: Marcelo Achile
- Manager: Fabián Nardozza
- League: Primera Nacional
- 2025: Primera Nacional Zone B, 10th of 18
- Website: defeweb.com.ar
| Home colours | Away colours | Third colours |

Club Atlético Defensores de Belgrano (usually known as Defensores de Belgrano) is an Argentine sports club from Nuñez, Buenos Aires. The club is mostly known for its football team, which currently plays in Primera Nacional, the regionalised second division of the Argentine league system.

Apart from football, other sports practised at Defensores de Belgrano are boxing, Brazilian jiu-jitsu, kickboxing, karate, and artistic roller skating.

== History ==
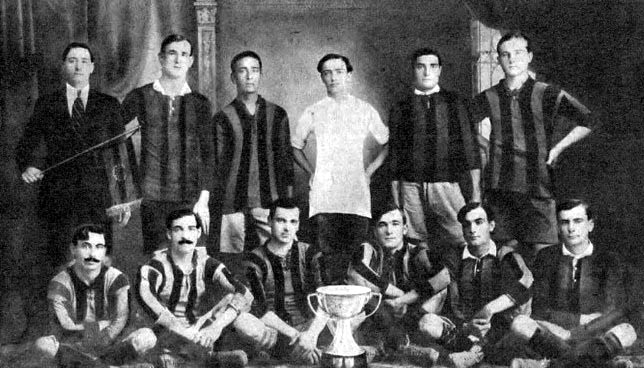
Team of Defensores that won the 1914 División Intermedia title, promoting to Primera División

Defensores de Belgrano was founded on 25 May 1906 by a group of young people who wanted to participate in the football leagues of Buenos Aires. In 1914, Defensores de Belgrano won the División Intermedia champion, therefore promoted to Primera División, the top division. The squad debuted in Primera in 1915, being relegated to the second division at the end of that season. The team returned to Primera for the 1918 season, remaining there until 1934 when the official association (AFA) (which Defensores was affiliated to) merged with the dissident professional league (Liga Argentina de Football); as a result of the merger, all teams in the amateur league were relegated to the second division.

During its first years, the team's color's were light blue and light pink but would later be changed to the red and black colors that have remained since then. The stadium was at the "Plaza Alberti" venue in the suburb of Belgrano, Buenos Aires.

In 1934 two players of the club, Ernesto Belis and Luis Izetta went on to play for the Argentina national team in the 1934 FIFA World Cup held in Italy that year.

For many decades Defensores played the league games between the B and the C League's, gaining promotion and also being relegated. Throughout that period a rivalry against Platense was developed.

In August 2011, the veteran 37-year-old player Ariel Ortega (who had been played for All Boys during the 2010–11 season) was signed by Defensores de Belgrano. The "Burrito" made his debut in the match against Deportivo Morón scoring a goal by penalty shot.

== Estadio Juan Pasquale ==
The Estadio Juan Pasquale is located in the Nuñez district of Buenos Aires. It is approximately 10 walking blocks away from Monumental stadium. The street's surrounding the Juan Pasquale contain many graffitied wall's and objects in tribute of Defensores de Belgrano, and are the meeting points of many of the club's supporters which begin walking in large groups upon their arrival to the stadium. The capacity of the stadium holds 9,000 people.

== Players ==
=== Current squad ===
As of 14 July 2022

Note: Flags indicate national team as defined under FIFA eligibility rules; some limited exceptions apply. Players may hold more than one non-FIFA nationality.

| No. | Pos. | Nation | Player |
|---|---|---|---|
| — | GK | ARG | Mariano Monllor |
| — | GK | ARG | Fernando Otárola |
| — | GK | ARG | Agustín Scilingo |
| — | DF | ARG | Maximiliano Centurión |
| — | DF | ARG | Emir Faccioli |
| — | DF | ARG | Gonzalo Mottes |
| — | DF | ARG | Luciano Goux |
| — | DF | ARG | Rodrigo Mazur |
| — | DF | ARG | Nicolás Álvarez |
| — | DF | ARG | Mauro Luque (loan from Racing Club) |
| — | DF | ARG | Francisco Martínez |
| — | DF | ARG | Christian Moreno |
| — | MF | ARG | Marcos Rivadero |
| — | MF | ARG | Agustín Benítez |

| No. | Pos. | Nation | Player |
|---|---|---|---|
| — | MF | ARG | Francisco Solé (loan from Barracas) |
| — | MF | ARG | Martín Rio |
| — | MF | ARG | Juan Manuel Olivares |
| — | MF | ARG | Fernando Chávez (loan from Independiente) |
| — | MF | ARG | Cristián Sánchez |
| — | MF | ARG | Ramiro Rumbolo |
| — | FW | ARG | Francisco Ilarregui (loan from Argentinos) |
| — | FW | ARG | Ramiro Cáseres |
| — | FW | ARG | Ezequiel Aguirre |
| — | FW | ARG | Nahuel Piethe |
| — | FW | ARG | Nicolás Benegas |
| — | FW | ARG | Iván Sandoval |
| — | FW | ARG | Juan Ignacio Baiardino (loan from Boca Juniors) |

=== Out on loan ===
Note: Flags indicate national team as defined under FIFA eligibility rules; some limited exceptions apply. Players may hold more than one non-FIFA nationality.

| No. | Pos. | Nation | Player |
|---|---|---|---|
| — | GK | ARG | Ignacio Pietrobono (at San Luis until 31 December 2022) |
| — | FW | ARG | Gonzalo Aquilino (at Deportivo Merlo until 31 December 2022) |

| No. | Pos. | Nation | Player |
|---|---|---|---|
| — | FW | ARG | Adrián Lugones (at Villa San Carlos until 31 December 2022) |

The club operates its junior divisions, beginning from age categories of Sub-7 until Sub-20 level.

== Former players ==
- (Peru) Eddy Carazas
- (Colombia) Tommy Mosquera

== Honours ==
=== National ===
- Primera B (2): 1967, 2000–01
- División Intermedia (2): 1914 FAF, 1917
- Primera C (4): 1953, 1958, 1972, 1991–92
