= 2019–20 Club Atlético Brown season =

Brown
2019–20 season
- President: Adrián Vairo
- Manager: Pablo Vicó
- Stadium: Estadio Lorenzo Arandilla
- Top goalscorer: League: Luciano Nieto (2); All: Luciano Nieto (2)

The 2019–20 season is Brown's 5th consecutive season in the second division of Argentine football, Primera B Nacional.

The season generally covers the period from 1 July 2019 to 30 June 2020.

== Review ==
=== Pre-season ===
On 7 June 2019, both Marcelo Lamas and Nicolás Benegas switched Brown for fellow Primera B Nacional team Defensores de Belgrano. Iván Silva's loan from Newell's Old Boys was extended on 11 June. A day later, Leonardo Zaragoza became departure number three as he joined Estudiantes (BA), though the club did soon announce their first incomings. Gastón Grecco was followed in the door by goalkeeper Mauro Ruggiero, signing respectively from Cañuelas and Flandria. Further outgoings were confirmed in the days after, with Alexis Vega (Temperley) and Maximiliano Resquín (Colegiales) leaving. Brown announced five arrivals on 26 June, with the loans of Elías Contreras and Nahuel Rodríguez being followed by Ezequiel Bonacorso, Iván Becker and Tomás Molina.

Juan Manuel Olivares, after rejecting a new contract with Brown, signed for Defensores de Belgrano on 26 June; player number three to make that move. Matías Cortave was the seventh name to leave on 27 June, as he went to Deportivo Morón. Paraguayan midfielder Rodrigo Burgos, from Talleres (C), joined them on that day, before Matías Ruiz Sosa made it nine to go by penning a deal with Comunicaciones. Numerous loans from the previous campaign officially expired on and around 30 June. Fernando Enrique came through the door soon after, as did Guillermo Sotelo. Ignacio Liporace departed to Atlético de Rafaela on 3 July, as forward Lucas Campana left for Estudiantes (BA). Ariel Kippes and Mauricio Carrasco made moves in on 4 July.

Luciano Nieto penned terms from Bolivian club Sport Boys by Pablo Vicó on 7 July. The manager secured his fourteenth new addition on 10 July in Felipe Cadenazzi from Mitre. Matías Linas, from relegated Los Andes, came to Adrogué after Cadenazzi on 11 July. Talleres (RE) revealed Adrián Maidana had swapped Brown for them on 13 July. On 17 July, Brown met Quilmes in their first pre-season friendly - subsequently suffering a goalless draw and a 2–1 loss. Two days later, they shared victories with Tristán Suárez in matches in Adrogué. Brown reinforced with a player on loan from Huracán on 23 July, as Fernando Cosciuc signed for one season. During which time, Brown played out two draws with the reserves of Defensa y Justicia at the Estadio Lorenzo Arandilla.

On 29 July, Brown were held to a goalless tie by San Telmo in a friendly - prior to losing to the Primera B Metropolitana outfit in the day's secondary encounter. Brown sealed consecutive 2–0 wins at home to Liniers on 7 August, with Tomás Molina notching a brace to secure the initial victory. Valentín Otondo (Olimpo) and Alex Sosa (Huracán) became new reinforcements for Pablo Vicó's squad on 14 August.

=== August ===
Brown opened their Primera B Nacional campaign with a score draw at home to Atlético de Rafaela on 17 August, with Alberto Stegman popping up with their goal. They grabbed their opening set of points a week later, as Luciano Nieto scored twice in a three-goal win away to All Boys. A first half goal from Matías Córdoba condemned Brown to defeat against Gimnasia y Esgrima (J) on 31 August.

== Squad ==
Squad No.	Nationality	Name	Position(s)	Date of birth (age)	Signed from
Goalkeepers
	Argentina	Sebastián Anchoverri	GK	26 April 1991 (age 35)	Olimpo
	Argentina	Agustín Quiroz	GK	2 March 1999 (age 27)	Academy
	Argentina	Martín Ríos	GK	14 July 1977 (age 49)	Estudiantes (BA)
	Argentina	Mauro Ruggiero	GK	16 May 1987 (age 39)	Flandria
Defenders
	Argentina	Ignacio Bogino	RB	22 February 1986 (age 40)	Temperley
	Argentina	Ezequiel Bonacorso	RB	9 August 1993 (age 33)	Mitre
	Argentina	Fernando Cosciuc	DF	19 February 1998 (age 28)	Huracán (loan)
	Argentina	Emir Faccioli	CB	5 August 1989 (age 37)	All Boys
	Argentina	Ariel Kippes	DF	25 February 1994 (age 32)	Sarmiento
	Argentina	Luciano Nieto	AM	19 January 1991 (age 35)	Sport Boys
	Argentina	Guillermo Sotelo	CB	1 January 1991 (age 35)	Sarmiento
	Argentina	Alberto Stegman	LB	1 February 1994 (age 32)	Tigre
Midfielders
	Argentina	Iván Becker	AM	18 May 1991 (age 35)	Estudiantes (BA)
	Paraguay	Rodrigo Burgos	MF	21 June 1989 (age 37)	Talleres (C)
	Argentina	Elías Contreras	MF	7 March 1997 (age 29)	Independiente (loan)
	Argentina	Fernando Enrique	RM	16 September 1985 (age 41)	Atlanta
	Argentina	Valentín Otondo	CM	20 August 1999 (age 27)	Olimpo
	Argentina	Nahuel Rodríguez	LM	18 March 1996 (age 30)	Argentinos Juniors (loan)
	Argentina	Iván Silva	CM	22 January 1994 (age 32)	Newell's Old Boys (loan)
	Argentina	Alex Sosa	RM		Huracán
Forwards
	Argentina	Néstor Benítez	FW	15 January 1999 (age 27)	Academy
	Uruguay	Maximiliano Brito	CF	19 July 1991 (age 35)	CAI
	Argentina	Felipe Cadenazzi	CF	12 October 1991 (age 35)	Mitre
	Argentina	Mauricio Carrasco	LW	24 September 1987 (age 39)	Royal Pari
	Argentina	Santiago De Sagastizabal	CF	9 May 1997 (age 29)	Academy
	Argentina	Leandro Garate	FW	2 September 1993 (age 33)	Deportivo Rincón
	Argentina	Francisco Gil	FW	3 May 2000 (age 26)	Academy
	Argentina	Gastón Grecco	FW	27 March 1981 (age 45)	Cañuelas
	Argentina	Matías Linas	FW	8 June 1993 (age 33)	Los Andes
	Argentina	Tomás Molina	CF	12 April 1995 (age 31)	Huracán

== Transfers ==
Domestic transfer windows:
3 July 2019 to 24 September 2019
20 January 2020 to 19 February 2020.

=== Transfers in ===
Date from	Position	Nationality	Name	From	Ref.
3 July 2019 (Note: Deal agreed on 12 June 2019)	FW	Argentina	Gastón Grecco	Cañuelas	
3 July 2019 (Note: Deal agreed on 12 June 2019)	GK	Argentina	Mauro Ruggiero	Flandria	
3 July 2019 (Note: Deal agreed on 26 June 2019)	RB	Argentina	Ezequiel Bonacorso	Unattached (Note: Previously played for Mitre (2018–2019).)	
3 July 2019 (Note: Deal agreed on 26 June 2019)	AM	Argentina	Iván Becker	Estudiantes (BA)	
3 July 2019 (Note: Deal agreed on 26 June 2019)	CF	Argentina	Tomás Molina	Huracán	
3 July 2019 (Note: Deal agreed on 27 June 2019)	MF	Paraguay	Rodrigo Burgos	Talleres (C)	
3 July 2019 (Note: Deal agreed on 30 June 2019)	MF	Argentina	Fernando Enrique	Atlanta	
3 July 2019 (Note: Deal agreed on 2 July 2019)	CB	Argentina	Guillermo Sotelo	Sarmiento	
4 July 2019	DF	Argentina	Ariel Kippes	Sarmiento	
4 July 2019	LW	Argentina	Mauricio Carrasco	Royal Pari	
7 July 2019	AM	Argentina	Luciano Nieto	Sport Boys	
10 July 2019	CF	Argentina	Felipe Cadenazzi	Mitre	
11 July 2019	FW	Argentina	Matías Linas	Los Andes	
14 August 2019	CM	Argentina	Valentín Otondo	Olimpo	
14 August 2019	RM	Argentina	Alex Sosa	Huracán	

=== Transfers out ===
Date from	Position	Nationality	Name	To	Ref.
3 July 2019 (Note: Deal agreed on 7 June 2019)	CM	Argentina	Marcelo Lamas	Defensores de Belgrano	
3 July 2019 (Note: Deal agreed on 7 June 2019)	CF	Argentina	Nicolás Benegas	Defensores de Belgrano	
3 July 2019 (Note: Deal agreed on 12 June 2019)	RB	Argentina	Leonardo Zaragoza	Estudiantes (BA)	
3 July 2019 (Note: Deal agreed on 14 June 2019)	RM	Argentina	Alexis Vega	Temperley	
3 July 2019 (Note: Deal agreed on 15 June 2019)	LW	Argentina	Maximiliano Resquín	Colegiales	
3 July 2019 (Note: Deal agreed on 26 June 2019)	RM	Argentina	Juan Manuel Olivares	Defensores de Belgrano	
3 July 2019 (Note: Deal agreed on 27 June 2019)	RB	Argentina	Matías Cortave	Deportivo Morón	
3 July 2019 (Note: Deal agreed on 27 June 2019)	AM	Argentina	Matías Ruiz Sosa	Comunicaciones	
3 July 2019	LB	Argentina	Ignacio Liporace	Atlético de Rafaela	
3 July 2019	CF	Argentina	Lucas Campana	Estudiantes (BA)	
13 July 2019	DM	Argentina	Adrián Maidana	Talleres (RE)	

=== Loans in ===
Start date	Position	Nationality	Name	From	End date	Ref.
3 July 2019 (Note: Deal agreed on 26 June 2019)	MF	Argentina	Elías Contreras	Independiente	30 June 2020	
3 July 2019 (Note: Deal agreed on 26 June 2019)	LM	Argentina	Nahuel Rodríguez	Argentinos Juniors	30 June 2020	
23 July 2019	DF	Argentina	Fernando Cosciuc	Huracán	30 June 2020	

== Friendlies ==
=== Pre-season ===
Friendly encounters with Quilmes was scheduled, on 21 June 2019, for 17 July. Tristán Suárez revealed matches with them on 28 June; for 20 July. They'd also face Defensa y Justicia Reserves, San Telmo and Liniers.

Win Draw Loss

17 July 2019 Friendly	Quilmes	0–0	Brown	Quilmes, Argentina
		Brown; InfoRegión; 50 min. match		Stadium: Estadio Centenario Ciudad de Quilmes

17 July 2019 Friendly	Quilmes	2–1	Brown	Quilmes, Argentina
	T. López; M. Prost	InfoRegión; 50 min. match	Rojas	Stadium: Estadio Centenario Ciudad de Quilmes

19 July 2019 Friendly	Brown	0–1	Tristán Suárez	Adrogué, Argentina
		InfoRegión; 50 min. match	F. Martínez 43'	Stadium: Estadio Lorenzo Arandilla; Attendance: 0 (Note: Behind closed doors.)

19 July 2019 Friendly	Brown	1–0	Tristán Suárez	Adrogué, Argentina
	L. Nieto	InfoRegión; 50 min. match		Stadium: Estadio Lorenzo Arandilla; Attendance: 0 (Note: Behind closed doors.)

23 July 2019 Friendly	Brown	1–1	Defensa y Justicia Reserves	Adrogué, Argentina
	L. Nieto	Brown; Olé	Goal	Stadium: Estadio Lorenzo Arandilla

23 July 2019 Friendly	Brown	2–2	Defensa y Justicia Reserves	Adrogué, Argentina
	Goal	Olé	Goal	Stadium: Estadio Lorenzo Arandilla

29 July 2019 Friendly	Brown	0–0	San Telmo	Adrogué, Argentina
		Grupo La Provincia; 70 min. match		Stadium: Estadio Lorenzo Arandilla

29 July 2019 Friendly	Brown	0–1	San Telmo	Adrogué, Argentina
		Grupo La Provincia; 70 min. match	A. Fernández	Stadium: Estadio Lorenzo Arandilla

7 August 2019 Friendly	Brown	2–0	Liniers	Adrogué, Argentina
	T. Molina	Brown; InfoRegión		Stadium: Estadio Lorenzo Arandilla

7 August 2019 Friendly	Brown	2–0	Liniers	Adrogué, Argentina
	M. Carrasco; N. Rodríguez	Brown; Mundo Ascenso		Stadium: Estadio Lorenzo Arandilla

== Competitions ==
=== Primera B Nacional ===
==== Results summary ====
Overall								Home						Away					
Pld	W	D	L	GF	GA	GD	Pts	W	D	L	GF	GA	GD	W	D	L	GF	GA	GD
3	1	1	1	4	2	+2	4	0	1	1	1	2	−1	1	0	0	3	0	+3

Last updated: 3 September 2019.
Source: Soccerway

==== Matches ====
The fixtures for the 2019–20 league season were announced on 1 August 2019, with a new format of split zones being introduced. Brown were drawn in Zone B.

Win Draw Loss

17 August 2019 1	Brown	1–1	Atlético de Rafaela	Adrogué, Argentina
12:00 GMT-3	A. Stegman 82'	Brown; Grupo La Provincia; Soccerway	A. Bonansea 45'	Stadium: Estadio Lorenzo Arandilla; Referee: Julio Barraza (Argentina)

25 August 2019 2	All Boys	0–3	Brown	Buenos Aires, Argentina
15:30 GMT-3		Brown; Grupo La Provincia; Soccerway	T. Molina 77'; L. Nieto 83', 90+4'	Stadium: Estadio Islas Malvinas; Referee: Diego Ceballos (Argentina)

31 August 2019 3	Brown	0–1	Gimnasia y Esgrima (J)	Adrogué, Argentina
15:30 GMT-3		Brown; Jujuy al Momento; Soccerway	M. Córdoba 38'	Stadium: Estadio Lorenzo Arandilla; Referee: Yamil Possi (Argentina)

9 September 2019 4	Santamarina	–	Brown	Tandil, Argentina
20:30 GMT-3				Stadium: Estadio Municipal General San Martín

== Squad statistics ==
=== Appearances and goals ===
No.	Pos.	Nationality	Name	League		Cup		League Cup		Continental		Other		Total		Discipline		Ref
No.	Pos.	Nationality	Name	Apps	Goals	Apps	Goals	Apps	Goals	Apps	Goals	Apps	Goals	Apps	Goals	Yellow card	Red card	Ref
–	GK	Argentina	Sebastián Anchoverri	0	0	—		—		—		0	0	0	0	0	0	
–	GK	Argentina	Agustín Quiroz	0	0	—		—		—		0	0	0	0	0	0	
–	GK	Argentina	Martín Ríos	0	0	—		—		—		0	0	0	0	0	0	
–	GK	Argentina	Mauro Ruggiero	3	0	—		—		—		0	0	3	0	0	0	
–	RB	Argentina	Ignacio Bogino	3	0	—		—		—		0	0	3	0	1	0	
–	DF	Argentina	Fernando Cosciuc	0	0	—		—		—		0	0	0	0	0	0	
–	CB	Argentina	Emir Faccioli	0	0	—		—		—		0	0	0	0	0	0	
–	DF	Argentina	Ariel Kippes	3	0	—		—		—		0	0	3	0	0	0	
–	AM	Argentina	Luciano Nieto	3	2	—		—		—		0	0	3	2	0	0	
–	CB	Argentina	Guillermo Sotelo	0(2)	0	—		—		—		0	0	0(2)	0	0	0	
–	LB	Argentina	Alberto Stegman	3	1	—		—		—		0	0	3	1	1	0	
–	FW	Argentina	Néstor Benítez	0	0	—		—		—		0	0	0	0	0	0	
–	CF	Uruguay	Maximiliano Brito	0	0	—		—		—		0	0	0	0	0	0	
–	CF	Argentina	Felipe Cadenazzi	0(3)	0	—		—		—		0	0	0(3)	0	0	0	
–	LW	Argentina	Mauricio Carrasco	0(1)	0	—		—		—		0	0	0(1)	0	0	0	
–	CF	Argentina	Santiago De Sagastizabal	0	0	—		—		—		0	0	0	0	0	0	
–	FW	Argentina	Leandro Garate	0	0	—		—		—		0	0	0	0	0	0	
–	FW	Argentina	Francisco Gil	0	0	—		—		—		0	0	0	0	0	0	
–	FW	Argentina	Gastón Grecco	0	0	—		—		—		0	0	0	0	0	0	
–	FW	Argentina	Matías Linas	3	0	—		—		—		0	0	3	0	0	0	
–	AM	Argentina	Iván Becker	3	0	—		—		—		0	0	3	0	1	0	
–	RB	Argentina	Ezequiel Bonacorso	3	0	—		—		—		0	0	3	0	0	0	
–	MF	Paraguay	Rodrigo Burgos	3	0	—		—		—		0	0	3	0	0	0	
–	MF	Argentina	Elías Contreras	0(2)	0	—		—		—		0	0	0(2)	0	0	0	
–	CM	Argentina	Valentín Otondo	0	0	—		—		—		0	0	0	0	0	0	
–	LM	Argentina	Nahuel Rodríguez	0	0	—		—		—		0	0	0	0	0	0	
–	CM	Argentina	Iván Silva	0(1)	0	—		—		—		0	0	0(1)	0	0	0	
–	LM	Argentina	Alex Sosa	0	0	—		—		—		0	0	0	0	0	0	
–	RM	Argentina	Fernando Enrique	3	0	—		—		—		0	0	3	0	0	0	
–	CF	Argentina	Tomás Molina	3	1	—		—		—		0	0	3	1	1	0	
Own goals				—	0	—		—		—		—	0	—	0	—	—	—

Statistics accurate as of 3 September 2019.

=== Goalscorers ===
Rank	Pos	No.	Nat	Name	League	Cup	League Cup	Continental	Other	Total	Ref
1	AM	–	Argentina	Luciano Nieto	2	0	—	—	0	2	
2	LB	–	Argentina	Alberto Stegman	1	0	—	—	0	1	
2	CF	–	Argentina	Tomás Molina	1	0	—	—	0	1	
Own goals					0	0	—	—	0	0	
Totals					4	0	—	—	0	4	—
