= Santiago De Sagastizabal =

Argentine professional footballer

Personal information
- Date of birth: 9 May 1997 (age 29)
- Place of birth: Argentina
- Height: 1.92 m (6 ft 3 1/2 in)
- Position: Centre-forward

Team information
- Current team: Cenaia
- Number: 66

Youth career
- Boca Juniors
- Argentinos Juniors
- Gimnasia y Esgrima

Senior career*
Years	Team	Apps	(Gls)
2018–2019	Brown	12	(0)
2019	Pavia		
2020	US Anconitana	7	(0)
2020	GS Felino		
2021	Ansan Greeners	8	(1)
2022	Felino	13	(2)
2022	Salsomaggiore		
2022–2023	Aglianese	20	(4)
2023–	Cenaia	1	(0)
- * Club domestic league appearances and goals as of 8 October 2023

Santiago De Sagastizabal (born 9 May 1997) is an Argentine professional footballer who plays as a centre-forward for Italian Serie D club Cenaia.

== Club career ==
De Sagastizabal had stints in the academies of Boca Juniors, Argentinos Juniors and Gimnasia y Esgrima, which preceded a move to Brown in August 2018. Signed by manager Pablo Vicó, the forward appeared as an unused substitute for a Primera B Nacional match with Guillermo Brown on 26 August. In the following September, De Sagastizabal made his professional bow in a 3–1 defeat to Atlético de Rafaela at the Estadio Nuevo Monumental; being subbed on late for Ignacio Liporace. He departed in June 2019, subsequently trialling at Italian Serie D side Este across July and August.

On 9 October 2019, it was confirmed that De Sagastizabal had joined Italian Eccellenza Lombardy side Pavia. He left on 21 December after scoring three goals, subsequently joining US Anconitana of Eccellenza Marche ahead of 2020. In the succeeding August, after seven appearances, De Sagastizabal switched clubs after agreeing terms with Eccellenza Emilia-Romagna's GS Felino. On 26 January 2021, De Sagastizabal completed a move to South Korea with K League 2 team Ansan Greeners.

== Career statistics ==
As of 11 December 2021.

Club statistics
Club	Season	League			Cup		League Cup		Continental		Other		Total	
Club	Season	Division	Apps	Goals	Apps	Goals	Apps	Goals	Apps	Goals	Apps	Goals	Apps	Goals
Brown	2018–19	Primera B Nacional	12	0	0	0	—		—		0	0	12	0
US Anconitana	2019–20	Eccellenza Marche	7	0	0	0	—		—		0	0	7	0
Ansan Greeners	2021	K League 2	8	1	0	0	—		—		0	0	8	1
Career total			27	1	0	0	—		—		0	0	27	1
