= Elías Contreras =

Argentine footballer (born 1997)

Personal information
- Date of birth: 7 March 1997 (age 29)
- Place of birth: Santa Fe, Argentina
- Height: 1.83 m (6 ft 0 in)
- Position: Right midfielder

Team information
- Current team: Deportivo Morón

Youth career
- Independiente

Senior career*
Years	Team	Apps	(Gls)
2019–2022	Independiente	0	(0)
2019–2020	→ Brown Adrogué (loan)	18	(0)
2020–2021	→ Temperley (loan)	32	(2)
2022	→ Brown Adrogué (loan)	28	(1)
2023–2025	Estudiantes BA	45	(4)
2023	→ Güemes (loan)	17	(0)
2025	Sportivo Luqueño	2	(0)
2025–	Deportivo Morón	17	(2)
- * Club domestic league appearances and goals as of 17:42, 27 April 2026 (UTC)

Elías Contreras (born 7 March 1997) is an Argentine professional footballer who plays as a right midfielder for Deportivo Morón.

== Career ==
Contreras' career started in the youth academy of Independiente. He signed his first professional contract with them in July 2018. On 26 June 2019, Primera B Nacional side Brown announced a loan deal had been agreed for Contreras. He made his professional debut in their 2019–20 league opener against Atlético de Rafaela on 17 August, as he replaced Fernando Enrique for the final twelve minutes of a 1–1 draw.

Contreras then had a loan spell at Temperley (October 2020 until the end of 2021), before returning to Brown de Adrogué in January 2022, once again on loan, until the end of the year.

In February 2023, Contreras joined Estudiantes de Buenos Aires.

== Career statistics ==
As of 11 July 2020.

Appearances and goals by club, season and competition
Club	Season	League			Cup		League Cup		Continental		Other		Total	
Club	Season	Division	Apps	Goals	Apps	Goals	Apps	Goals	Apps	Goals	Apps	Goals	Apps	Goals
Independiente	2019–20	Primera División	0	0	0	0	0	0	0	0	0	0	0	0
Brown (loan)	2019–20	Primera B Nacional	18	0	0	0	—		—		0	0	18	0
Career total			18	0	0	0	0	0	0	0	0	0	18	0
