= Matías Sosa =

Matías Sosa may refer to:

- Matías Sosa (footballer, born 1992), Argentine attacking midfielder
- Matías Sosa (footballer, born 1995), Argentine attacking midfielder
- Matías Sosa (footballer, born 2001), Argentine striker

== See also ==
- Matías Ruiz Sosa (born 1992), Argentine attacking midfielder
