= Maximiliano Brito =

Uruguayan footballer (born 1991)

Personal information
- Full name: Maximiliano Brito Hernández
- Date of birth: 19 July 1991 (age 35)
- Place of birth: Montevideo, Uruguay
- Height: 1.86 m (6 ft 1 in)
- Position: Forward

Team information
- Current team: Brown

Senior career*
Years	Team	Apps	(Gls)
2010–2014	Rampla Juniors	39	(9)
2012	→ Olimpo (loan)	0	(0)
2013–2014	→ Patriotas (loan)	26	(4)
2014	CAI	10	(4)
2015–2021	Brown	38	(11)
2016–2017	→ Nueva Chicago (loan)	40	(7)
2017	→ Deportivo Morón (loan)	10	(1)
2018	→ Acassuso (loan)	16	(3)
2018–2021	→ Deportivo Riestra (loan)	51	(5)
2022	Sarmiento Resistencia	33	(5)
2023	Nueva Chicago	6	(0)
2023	→ UAI Urquiza (loan)	16	(5)
2024–	Deportivo Riestra	6	(0)
- * Club domestic league appearances and goals as of 16:42, 11 January 2025 (UTC)

Maximiliano Brito Hernández (born 19 July 1991) is a Uruguayan professional footballer who plays as a forward for Deportivo Riestra.

== Career ==
Brito's senior career got underway in Uruguay with Rampla Juniors. The forward made twenty-three appearances across the 2010–11 and 2011–12 seasons, notably scoring four goals in the latter as the club were relegated to the Segunda División. Brito spent the first half of the subsequent 2012–13 out on loan with Olimpo in Argentina, though wouldn't feature competitively in Primera B Nacional. He returned to his parent team in January 2013, with sixteen games and five goals arriving in Uruguay's second tier. Brito was loaned to Patriotas on 19 July 2013. He scored on his first start versus Cúcuta Deportivo.

After further goals in Colombia against Deportes Tolima, Atlético Nacional and Atlético Huila across two campaigns with the Categoría Primera A outfit, Brito made a return to Argentina after agreeing terms with CAI of Torneo Federal A. Four goals, including a brace over Independiente, occurred in 2014. January 2015 saw Primera B Metropolitana side Brown sign Brito. He scored three goals in his first four appearances, which preceded him netting in eight further fixtures as they won the title. Brito switched tier three for Primera B Nacional in January 2016, as he completed a loan move to Nueva Chicago.

Brito, having played two seasons with Nueva Chicago, spent 2017–18 split across the second and third tiers in Argentina with Deportivo Morón and Acassuso; netting one and three goals respectively. On 2 July 2018, Brito agreed a fourth loan away from Brown as he signed with Deportivo Riestra in Primera B Metropolitana. He made his bow in a home victory over Comunicaciones on 18 August. He remained for two seasons in total, making thirty-two appearances and scoring two goals.

== Career statistics ==
As of 26 October 2020.

Appearances and goals by club, season and competition
Club	Season	League			Cup		League Cup		Continental		Other		Total	
Club	Season	Division	Apps	Goals	Apps	Goals	Apps	Goals	Apps	Goals	Apps	Goals	Apps	Goals
Rampla Juniors	2010–11	Primera División	8	0	—		—		—		0	0	8	0
Rampla Juniors	2011–12	Primera División	15	4	—		—		—		0	0	15	4
Rampla Juniors	2012–13	Segunda División	16	5	—		—		—		0	0	16	5
Rampla Juniors	2013–14	Segunda División	0	0	—		—		—		0	0	0	0
Rampla Juniors	Total		39	9	—		—		—		0	0	39	9
Olimpo (loan)	2012–13	Primera B Nacional	0	0	0	0	—		—		0	0	0	0
Patriotas (loan)	2013	Categoría Primera A	16	3	0	0	—		—		0	0	16	3
Patriotas (loan)	2014	Categoría Primera A	10	1	0	0	—		—		0	0	10	1
Patriotas (loan)	Total		26	4	0	0	—		—		0	0	26	4
CAI	2014	Torneo Federal A	10	4	1	0	—		—		3 (Note: Appearance(s) in the Torneo Federal A play-offs)	0	14	4
Brown	2015	Primera B Metropolitana	38	11	1	0	—		—		0	0	39	11
Brown	2016	Primera B Nacional	0	0	0	0	—		—		0	0	0	0
Brown	2016–17	Primera B Nacional	0	0	0	0	—		—		0	0	0	0
Brown	2017–18	Primera B Nacional	0	0	0	0	—		—		0	0	0	0
Brown	2018–19	Primera B Nacional	0	0	0	0	—		—		0	0	0	0
Brown	2019–20	Primera B Nacional	0	0	0	0	—		—		0	0	0	0
Brown	Total		38	11	1	0	—		—		0	0	39	11
Nueva Chicago (loan)	2016	Primera B Nacional	15	4	0	0	—		—		0	0	15	4
Nueva Chicago (loan)	2016–17	Primera B Nacional	25	3	2	0	—		—		0	0	27	3
Nueva Chicago (loan)	Total		40	7	2	0	—		—		0	0	42	7
Deportivo Morón (loan)	2017–18	Primera B Nacional	10	1	1	0	—		—		0	0	11	1
Acassuso (loan)	2017–18	Primera B Metropolitana	16	3	0	0	—		—		1 (Note: Appearance(s) in the Primera B Metropolitana play-offs)	0	17	3
Deportivo Riestra (loan)	2018–19	Primera B Metropolitana	17	0	0	0	—		—		0	0	17	0
Deportivo Riestra (loan)	2019–20	Primera B Metropolitana	15	2	0	0	—		—		0	0	15	2
Deportivo Riestra (loan)	Total		32	2	0	0	—		—		0	0	32	2
Career total			211	41	5	0	—		—		4	0	220	41

== Honours ==
Brown

- Primera B Metropolitana: 2015
