= Martín Ríos (footballer) =

Argentine footballer

Personal information
- Full name: Martín Rubén Ríos
- Date of birth: 14 July 1977 (age 49)
- Place of birth: Arrecifes, Argentina
- Height: 1.79 m (5 ft 10 1/2 in)
- Position: Goalkeeper

Team information
- Current team: Deportivo Merlo

Youth career
- Villa Sanguinetti
- Boca Juniors

Senior career*
Years	Team	Apps	(Gls)
1998–2003	Huracán	140	(0)
2003–2005	Ferro Carril Oeste	82	(0)
2006–2008	Universidad Católica	74	(0)
2008–2009	Juventud Alianza	28	(0)
2009–2010	Deportivo Maipú	50	(0)
2010–2015	Estudiantes BA	162	(0)
2015	→ Brown de Adrogué (loan)	42	(0)
2016–2021	Brown de Adrogué	170	(0)
2022–	Deportivo Merlo	9	(0)
- * Club domestic league appearances and goals as of 15:31, 23 June 2022 (UTC)

Martín Rubén Ríos (born 14 July 1977) is an Argentine professional footballer who plays as a goalkeeper for Deportivo Merlo.

== Career ==
Villa Sanguinetti and Boca Juniors were Ríos' youth clubs. He played for Huracán between 1998 and 2003, making 140 appearances across various Argentine Primera División and Primera B Nacional campaigns. He departed the club in 2003 to join second tier Ferro Carril Oeste, with the goalkeeper subsequently being selected in eighty-two matches in over two years with them. 2006 saw Ríos join Ecuadorian Serie B side Universidad Católica. They were promoted to Serie A in his second of three seasons in Ecuador. Ríos agreed to play for Juventud Alianza of Torneo Argentino B in 2008.

After a stint with Deportivo Maipú, Ríos completed a move to Estudiantes in 2010. He remained for five seasons, participating in 163 Primera B Metropolitana fixtures; his last appearance was a promotion play-off semi-final defeat to Villa Dálmine on 29 November 2014. Ríos joined fellow third division side Brown on loan in the following January. He made 42 appearances in the 2015 campaign as Brown won the title and subsequent promotion to Primera B Nacional; finishing above his parent club by one point. Brown signed Ríos permanently in January 2016.

On 11 January 2022, 44-year old Ríos joined Primera B Metropolitana club Deportivo Merlo.

== Career statistics ==
As of 26 November 2018.

Club statistics
Club	Season	League			Cup (Note: Includes the Copa Argentina)		League Cup		Continental		Other		Total	
Club	Season	Division	Apps	Goals	Apps	Goals	Apps	Goals	Apps	Goals	Apps	Goals	Apps	Goals
Huracán	1999–2000	Primera B Nacional	36	0	0	0	—		—		0	0	36	0
Juventud Alianza	2008–09	Torneo Argentino B	28	0	0	0	—		—		0	0	28	0
Estudiantes	2012–13	Primera B Metropolitana	40	0	4	0	—		—		0	0	44	0
Estudiantes	2013–14	Primera B Metropolitana	40	0	6	0	—		—		0	0	46	0
Estudiantes	2014	Primera B Metropolitana	20	0	3	0	—		—		1 (Note: One appearance in the 2014 Primera B Metropolitana play-offs)	0	24	0
Estudiantes	2015	Primera B Metropolitana	0	0	0	0	—		—		0	0	0	0
Estudiantes	Total		100	0	13	0	—		—		1	0	114	0
Brown (loan)	2015	Primera B Metropolitana	42	0	1	0	—		—		0	0	43	0
Brown	2016	Primera B Nacional	21	0	0	0	—		—		0	0	21	0
Brown	2016–17	Primera B Nacional	44	0	1	0	—		—		0	0	45	0
Brown	2017–18	Primera B Nacional	24	0	0	0	—		—		3 (Note: Three appearances in the 2017–18 Primera B Nacional play-offs)	0	27	0
Brown	2018–19	Primera B Nacional	11	0	3	0	—		—		0	0	14	0
Brown	Total		142	0	5	0	—		—		3	0	150	0
Career total			348	0	18	0	—		—		4	0	370	0

== Honours ==
Huracán

- Primera B Nacional: 1999–2000

Universidad Católica

- Ecuadorian Serie B: 2007

Brown

- Primera B Nacional: 2015
