= Liporace =

Liporace is an Italian surname. Notable people with the surname include:

- Enrique Liporace (1941–2024), Argentine actor
- Ignacio Liporace (born 1992), Argentine footballer
