= Fernando Enrique =

Fernando Enrique may refer to:

- Fernando Enrique (canoeist) (born 1998), Cuban sprint canoeist
- Fernando Enrique (footballer) (born 1985), Argentine midfielder
