= Guillermo Sotelo =

Argentine footballer

Personal information
- Date of birth: 30 March 1991 (age 35)
- Place of birth: Reconquista, Argentina
- Height: 1.80 m (5 ft 11 in)
- Position: Left-back

Team information
- Current team: FF Jaro
- Number: 2

Youth career
- Atlético y Tiro
- Renato Cesarini
- Alianza Sport Rosario
- San Lorenzo
- Huracán

Senior career*
Years	Team	Apps	(Gls)
2012–2016	Huracán	47	(2)
2016	→ Crucero del Norte (loan)	15	(2)
2016–2019	Crucero del Norte	66	(6)
2019	Sarmiento	1	(0)
2019–2020	Brown de Adrogué	10	(0)
2020–2022	Jaro	61	(12)
2022	HIFK	10	(0)
2023–	Jaro	58	(7)
- * Club domestic league appearances and goals as of 20 November 2025

Guillermo Sotelo (born 1 January 1991) is an Argentine professional footballer who plays as a left-back for Finnish club FF Jaro.

== Career ==
Sotelo began in the youth ranks of Atlético y Tiro, before spending time with the academies of Renato Cesarini, Alianza Sport Rosario, San Lorenzo and Huracán; who gave Sotelo his start in senior football. He made his debut in Primera B Nacional during a 1–1 draw with Atlético Tucumán on 22 October 2012, prior to netting his first goal in the following November against Douglas Haig. Another goal versus Aldosivi arrived in 2012–13, as the left-back featured twenty-six times in all competitions. His third season ended with promotion to the Primera División. His top-flight bow came in a loss to Godoy Cruz in early 2015.

Before departing Eduardo Domínguez's team in 2016, Sotelo was sent off in his final game for Huracán; against Racing Club in April 2015. In January 2016, Primera B Nacional side Crucero del Norte loaned Sotelo. He remained for three years, having been signed permanently six months into his loan contract, with the Garupá team, the last two of which were spent in Torneo Federal A after they suffered relegation in 2016–17. He made a total of eighty-nine appearances for Crucero del Norte, whilst scoring nine times and also receiving three red cards. On 20 January 2019, Sotelo joined Sarmiento of the tier two.

On 6 July 2020, after spending the 2019–20 campaign with Brown, Sotelo headed to Finnish football with Ykkönen side FF Jaro. His first appearance arrived on 26 July against MYPA, which preceded him subsequently netting his first goal for Jaro against the same opponents on 20 September. He scored again in his penultimate match for the club versus MuSa on 31 October, as they eventually missed out on the promotion play-offs by six points. in February 2021 Sotelo returned to Finland to play in FF Jaro again.

In the summer 2022, HIFK in Veikkausliiga acquired Sotelo for an undisclosed fee. On 27 February 2023, Sotelo returned to FF Jaro.

== Career statistics ==
As of 27 February 2025.

Appearances and goals by club, season and competition
Club	Season	League			Cup (Note: Includes Copa Argentina and Suomen Cup)		Continental		Other		Total	
Club	Season	Division	Apps	Goals	Apps	Goals	Apps	Goals	Apps	Goals	Apps	Goals
Huracán	2012–13	Primera B Nacional	24	2	2	0	—		0	0	26	2
Huracán	2013–14	Primera B Nacional	8	0	1	0	—		0	0	9	0
Huracán	2014	Primera B Nacional	9	0	2	0	—		1 (Note: Appearance(s) in the Primera B Nacional play-offs)	0	12	0
Huracán	2015	Primera División	6	0	0	0	4 (Note: Appearance(s) in the Copa Libertadores and Copa Sudamericana)	0	0	0	10	0
Huracán	2016	Primera División	0	0	0	0	0	0	0	0	0	0
Huracán	Total		47	2	5	0	4	0	1	0	57	2
Crucero del Norte (loan)	2016	Primera B Nacional	15	2	1	0	—		0	0	16	2
Crucero del Norte	2016–17	Primera B Nacional	34	1	0	0	—		0	0	34	1
Crucero del Norte	2017–18	Torneo Federal A	19	3	2	1	—		5 (Note: Appearance(s) in the Torneo Federal A play-offs)	0	26	4
Crucero del Norte	2018–19	Torneo Federal A	13	2	0	0	—		0	0	13	2
Crucero del Norte	Total		81	8	3	1	—		5	0	89	9
Sarmiento	2018–19	Primera B Nacional	1	0	1	0	—		1	0	3	0
Brown	2019–20	Primera B Nacional	10	0	0	0	—		0	0	10	0
Jaro	2020	Ykkönen	15	2	0	0	—		0	0	15	0
Jaro	2021	Ykkönen	23	8	2	2	–		–		25	10
Jaro	2022	Ykkönen	13	2	3	1	–		6	2	22	5
Jaro	Total		61	12	5	3	—		6	2	72	17
HIFK	2022	Veikkausliiga	10	0	–		–		–		10	0
Jaro	2023	Ykkönen	20	4	1	0	–		–		21	4
Jaro	2024	Ykkösliiga	23	3	2	0	–		4 (Note: Appearances in Ykkösliicacup)	0	28	3
Jaro	2025	Veikkausliiga	0	0	0	0	–		3 (Note: Appearances in Finnish League Cup)	0	3	0
Jaro	Total		43	7	3	0	—		7	0	53	7
JBK	2024	Kakkonen	1	0	–		–		–		1	0
Career total			234	29	17	4	4	0	20	2	275	35

== Honours ==
Huracán

- Copa Argentina: 2013–14

== Honours ==
Jaro

- Ykkösliiga runner-up: 2024
- Ykköscup: 2022
- Ykkösliigacup: 2024
