= Franco Benítez =

Franco Benítez may refer to:

- Franco Benítez (footballer, born 1991), Argentine football midfielder for Excursionistas
- Franco Benítez (footballer, born 2002), Argentine football attackind midfielder for Universidad de Concepción
