= Felipe Cadenazzi =

Argentine professional footballer

Personal information
- Full name: Felipe Cadenazzi
- Date of birth: 12 October 1991 (age 35)
- Place of birth: Santa Fe, Argentina
- Height: 1.91 m (6 ft 3 in)
- Position: Striker

Team information
- Current team: PSIS Semarang
- Number: 91

Youth career
- Atlético de Rafaela

Senior career*
Years	Team	Apps	(Gls)
2014	Flamengo de Guarulhos	2	(0)
2015–2018	Atlético Paraná	68	(13)
2017–2018	→ Quilmes (loan)	15	(5)
2018–2019	Mitre	14	(0)
2019–2020	Brown de Adrogué	15	(2)
2020–2022	Alvarado	31	(13)
2022–2023	Seoul E-Land	33	(10)
2023	Magallanes	5	(0)
2023–2024	Borneo Samarinda	29	(15)
2024–2025	Defensor Sporting	9	(2)
2025–2026	PSMS Medan	20	(12)
2026–	PSIS Semarang	5	(0)
- * Club domestic league appearances and goals as of 21 November 2026

Felipe Cadenazzi (born 12 October 1991) is an Argentine professional footballer who plays as a striker for Championship club PSIS Semarang.

== Career ==
Cadenazzi featured in Atlético de Rafaela's academy, prior to starting his senior career with Central Córdoba in 2011; making one Torneo Argentino A appearance. Cadenazzi made a move to regional football by joining Corinthians Santa Fe in 2012; a team co-founded by their Brazilian namesakes. Cadenazzi made the move to Brazilian football itself in 2014, joining Campeonato Paulista Série A3 side Flamengo. He made appearances for the club against Santacruzense and Rio Preto. In January 2015, after a stint back with Corinthians Santa Fe, Cadenazzi signed for Atlético Paraná. Thirteen in sixty-nine games followed.

Quilmes became Cadenazzi's fifth different senior club on 31 July 2017. He made his debut against Sarmiento on 18 September, before scoring his first goal for them on 23 September versus Villa Dálmine. He ended the 2017–18 campaign with five goals in fifteen fixtures as Quilmes finished twelfth. Cadenazzi joined Mitre of Primera B Nacional in July 2018. A year later, Cadenazzi moved across the division to Brown. He scored three goals in thirty total matches across those two stints. In July 2020, Cadenazzi headed to Alvarado.

In 2022, Cadenazzi joined Seoul E-Land of South Korean K League 2. He scored his first goal for the club at an away match against Gyeongnam held in February 20. He scored his second goal via penalty at a match against Gimpo held on 17 May, which was also the first goal for the club at Mokdong Stadium.

On 20 July 2023, Cadenazzi signed for Liga 1 club Borneo Samarinda. On 2 November 2023, Cadenazzi scored his first hat-trick for Borneo Samarinda in a 3–0 win against Persik.

On 12 October 2026, Cadenazzi signed for Championship club PSIS Semarang.

== Career statistics ==
As of match played 21 November 2026

Club statistics
Club	Season	League			Cup		League Cup		Continental		Other		Total	
Club	Season	Division	Apps	Goals	Apps	Goals	Apps	Goals	Apps	Goals	Apps	Goals	Apps	Goals
Flamengo	2014	Paulista Série A3	—		0	0	—		—		2 (Note: Appearance(s) in Campeonato Paulista Série A3)	0	2	0
Atlético Paraná	2015	Primera B Nacional	12	1	0	0	—		—		0	0	12	1
Atlético Paraná	2016	Primera B Nacional	18	4	1	0	—		—		0	0	19	4
Atlético Paraná	2016–17	Primera B Nacional	38	8	0	0	—		—		0	0	38	8
Atlético Paraná	Total		68	13	1	0	—		—		0	0	69	13
Quilmes	2017–18	Primera B Nacional	15	5	0	0	—		—		0	0	15	5
Mitre	2018–19	Primera B Nacional	14	0	1	1	—		—		0	0	15	1
Brown de Adrogué	2019–20	Primera B Nacional	15	2	0	0	—		—		0	0	15	2
Alvarado	2020	Primera B Nacional	6	2	1	0	—		—		0	0	0	0
Alvarado	2021	Primera B Nacional	25	11	0	0	—		—		0	0	0	0
Alvarado	Total		143	33	3	1	—		—		0	0	146	34
Seoul E-Land	2022	K League 2	33	10	1	0	—		—		0	0	34	10
Magallanes	2023	Chilean Primera División	5	0	1	2	—		4	0	0	0	10	2
Borneo Samarinda	2023–24	Liga 1	29	15	0	0	—		—		0	0	29	15
Defensor Sporting	2024	Liga AUF Uruguaya	6	2	0	0	—		—		0	0	6	2
Defensor Sporting	2025	Liga AUF Uruguaya	3	0	0	0	—		—		0	0	3	0
Defensor Sporting	Total		9	2	0	0	—		—		0	0	9	2
PSMS Medan	2025–26	Championship	20	12	0	0	—		—		0	0	20	12
PSIS Semarang	2026–27	Championship	5	0	0	0	0	0	—		0	0	5	0
Career total			244	69	5	2	—		4	0	0	0	253	71

== Honours ==
Individual

- Liga 1 Player of the Month: November 2023
