= Kippes =

Kippes is a surname. Notable people with the surname include:

- Ariel Kippes (born 1994), Argentinian footballer
- Otto Kippes (1905–1994), German Catholic priest and amateur astronomer
