= Carlos Espínola =

Carlos Espínola may refer to:

- Carlos Espínola (footballer, born 1975), Paraguayan defender
- Carlos Espínola (footballer, born 1995), Argentine midfielder
- Carlos Espínola (sailor) (born 1971), Argentine windsurfer
