= Adrián Maidana =

Argentine footballer

Personal information
- Full name: Adrián Alejandro Maidana
- Date of birth: 30 November 1988 (age 37)
- Place of birth: La Francia, Argentina
- Position: Midfielder

Team information
- Current team: Talleres (on loan from Brown)

Senior career*
Years	Team	Apps	(Gls)
2009–2014	Belgrano	22	(0)
2011–2013	→ Sarmiento (loan)	58	(3)
2013–2014	→ Brown (loan)	30	(2)
2014	→ Nueva Chicago (loan)	9	(0)
2015–	Brown	93	(3)
2019–	→ Talleres (loan)	15	(0)
- * Club domestic league appearances and goals as of 19:36, 23 June 2020 (UTC)

Adrián Alejandro Maidana (born 30 November 1988) is an Argentine professional footballer who plays as a midfielder for Talleres, on loan from Brown.

== Career ==
Maidana began his career with Primera B Nacional's Belgrano. He made his professional debut on 20 June 2009 during a 2–1 defeat to All Boys, which was one of three appearances in 2008–09 which ended with Belgrano losing in the promotion play-offs to Rosario Central. They were promoted two seasons later, with Maidana having featured twenty-four times. Ahead of 2011–12, Maidana was loaned to Sarmiento of Primera B Metropolitana. He scored his first senior goal in August 2011 against Temperley. He returned to Belgrano two years later, which preceded an immediate loan move to Brown on 18 July 2013.

After two goals in thirty games on loan with Brown, with Maidana back with his parent club, he was loaned out for a third time to Primera B Nacional side Nueva Chicago. Seven months later, in February 2015, Maidana departed Belgrano permanently to rejoin Brown; now in the third tier. He netted goals in matches with Tristán Suárez and Comunicaciones as the club won promotion to the 2016 Primera B Nacional. July 2019 saw Maidana loaned to Primera B Metropolitana's Talleres.

== Career statistics ==
As of 23 June 2020.

Club statistics
Club	Season	League			Cup (Note: Includes the Copa Argentina)		League Cup		Continental		Other		Total	
Club	Season	Division	Apps	Goals	Apps	Goals	Apps	Goals	Apps	Goals	Apps	Goals	Apps	Goals
Belgrano	2008–09	Primera B Nacional	1	0	0	0	—		—		2 (Note: Two appearances in the 2008–09 Primera B Nacional play-offs)	0	3	0
Belgrano	2009–10	Primera B Nacional	14	0	0	0	—		—		0	0	14	0
Belgrano	2010–11	Primera B Nacional	7	0	0	0	—		—		0	0	7	0
Belgrano	2011–12	Primera División	0	0	0	0	—		—		0	0	0	0
Belgrano	2012–13	Primera División	0	0	0	0	—		—		0	0	0	0
Belgrano	2013–14	Primera División	0	0	0	0	—		—		0	0	0	0
Belgrano	2014	Primera División	0	0	0	0	—		—		0	0	0	0
Belgrano	Total		22	0	0	0	—		—		2	0	24	0
Sarmiento (loan)	2011–12	Primera B Metropolitana	35	2	3	0	—		—		0	0	38	2
Sarmiento (loan)	2012–13	Primera B Nacional	23	1	0	0	—		—		0	0	23	1
Sarmiento (loan)	Total		58	3	0	0	—		—		0	0	58	3
Brown (loan)	2013–14	Primera B Nacional	30	2	0	0	—		—		0	0	30	2
Nueva Chicago (loan)	2014	Primera B Nacional	9	0	0	0	—		—		0	0	9	0
Brown	2015	Primera B Metropolitana	35	2	0	0	—		—		0	0	35	2
Brown	2016	Primera B Nacional	16	0	0	0	—		—		0	0	16	0
Brown	2016–17	Primera B Nacional	29	1	1	0	—		—		0	0	30	1
Brown	2017–18	Primera B Nacional	0	0	0	0	—		—		0	0	0	0
Brown	2018–19	Primera B Nacional	13	0	3	0	—		—		0	0	16	0
Brown	2019–20	Primera B Nacional	0	0	0	0	—		—		0	0	0	0
Brown	Total		93	3	4	0	—		—		0	0	97	3
Talleres (loan)	2019–20	Primera B Metropolitana	15	0	0	0	—		—		0	0	15	0
Career total			227	8	7	0	—		—		0	0	234	8

== Honours ==
Sarmiento

- Primera B Metropolitana: 2011–12

Brown

- Primera B Metropolitana: 2015
