= Francisco Nouet =

Argentine footballer

Personal information
- Date of birth: 25 May 1998 (age 28)
- Place of birth: San Pedro, Argentina
- Height: 1.84 m (6 ft 0 in)
- Position: Left winger

Team information
- Current team: Atlético Rafaela

Youth career
- Paraná de San Pedro
- Villa Dálmine

Senior career*
Years	Team	Apps	(Gls)
2017–2023	Villa Dálmine	50	(9)
2019–2020	→ Flandria (loan)	16	(1)
2023	Temperley	6	(0)
2023–2025	Brown de Adrogué	48	(0)
2025	Tristán Suárez	8	(0)
2025–2026	Nueva Chicago	15	(0)
2026–	Atlético Rafaela	3	(0)
- * Club domestic league appearances and goals as of 18:27, 27 March 2026 (UTC)

Francisco Nouet (born 25 May 1998) is an Argentine professional footballer who plays as a left winger for Atlético Rafaela.

== Career ==
Nouet began with Paraná de San Pedro, before joining Villa Dálmine. The 2017–18 campaign in Primera B Nacional saw Nouet make his bow in senior football, making it during a 1–1 draw away to Instituto on 2 February 2018; he had previously been an unused substitute for games with Sarmiento and Estudiantes in 2017. He featured in a total of five fixtures in 2017–18 as they placed eighth; losing in the play-offs to San Martín. In July 2019, Nouet was loaned to Primera B Metropolitana team Flandria; reuniting with his brother. He scored on his second appearance, netting in a 3–1 victory away to Fénix; his sibling also scored.

== Personal life ==
Nouet's brother, Matías, is a fellow professional footballer; both of them began their senior careers with Villa Dálmine.

== Career statistics ==
As of 27 August 2020.

Appearances and goals by club, season and competition
Club	Season	League			Cup		League Cup		Continental		Other		Total	
Club	Season	Division	Apps	Goals	Apps	Goals	Apps	Goals	Apps	Goals	Apps	Goals	Apps	Goals
Villa Dálmine	2017–18	Primera B Nacional	5	0	0	0	—		—		0	0	5	0
Villa Dálmine	2018–19	Primera B Nacional	1	0	1	0	—		—		0	0	2	0
Villa Dálmine	2019–20	Primera B Nacional	0	0	0	0	—		—		0	0	0	0
Villa Dálmine	Total		6	0	1	0	—		—		0	0	7	0
Flandria (loan)	2019–20	Primera B Metropolitana	16	1	0	0	—		—		0	0	16	1
Career total			22	1	1	0	—		—		0	0	23	1
