= Sebastián Anchoverri =

Argentine footballer

Personal information
- Full name: Sebastián Ezequiel Anchoverri Ponce
- Date of birth: 26 April 1991 (age 35)
- Place of birth: Lomas de Zamora, Argentina
- Height: 1.81 m (5 ft 11 1/2 in)
- Position: Goalkeeper

Team information
- Current team: Chacarita Juniors

Youth career
- Temperley
- 2003–2013: Lanús

Senior career*
Years	Team	Apps	(Gls)
2013–2016	San Telmo	100	(0)
2016–2018	Olimpo	4	(0)
2018–2019	Brown de Adrogué	0	(0)
2019–2020	San Miguel	25	(0)
2020–2021	Deportivo Español	5	(0)
2021–2023	Ferrocarril Midland	61	(0)
2023–2025	Sportivo Italiano	68	(0)
2025–2026	Gimnasia Jujuy	2	(0)
2026–	Chacarita Juniors	0	(0)
- * Club domestic league appearances and goals as of 17:43, 1 April 2026 (UTC)

Sebastián Ezequiel Anchoverri Ponce (born 26 April 1991) is an Argentine professional footballer who plays as a goalkeeper for Chacarita Juniors.

== Career ==
Anchoverri started in the youth system of Temperley, which preceded a ten-year youth spell with Lanús. He departed Lanús in 2013 to play for San Telmo in Primera B Metropolitana. His professional debut arrived on 29 April during an away defeat to Almagro, which was one of five appearances for Anchoverri in 2012–13 which ended with relegation. In Primera C Metropolitana, Anchoverri made a total of seventy-six appearances in two years which concluded with San Telmo winning the 2015 title. On 30 June 2016, Anchoverri joined Argentine Primera División side Olimpo. He terminated his contract with Olimpo in April 2018.

He was subsequently signed by Brown of Primera B Nacional on 30 June.

== Career statistics ==
As of 5 September 2018.

Club statistics
Club	Season	League			Cup (Note: Includes the Copa Argentina)		League Cup		Continental		Other		Total	
Club	Season	Division	Apps	Goals	Apps	Goals	Apps	Goals	Apps	Goals	Apps	Goals	Apps	Goals
Olimpo	2016–17	Primera División	0	0	0	0	—		—		0	0	0	0
Olimpo	2017–18	Primera División	4	0	0	0	—		—		0	0	4	0
Olimpo	Total		4	0	0	0	—		—		0	0	4	0
Brown	2018–19	Primera B Nacional	0	0	0	0	—		—		0	0	0	0
Career total			4	0	0	0	—		—		0	0	4	0

== Honours ==
San Telmo

- Primera C Metropolitana: 2015
