= Maximiliano Resquín =

Argentine footballer

Personal information
- Full name: Maximiliano Guillermo Resquín
- Date of birth: 26 April 1995 (age 31)
- Place of birth: Buenos Aires, Argentina
- Position: Midfielder

Team information
- Current team: Colegiales

Senior career*
Years	Team	Apps	(Gls)
2013–2018	Colegiales	68	(3)
2018–2019	Brown	9	(1)
2019–	Colegiales	0	(0)
- * Club domestic league appearances and goals as of 00:24, 16 September 2019 (UTC)

Maximiliano Guillermo Resquín (born 26 April 1995) is an Argentine professional footballer who plays as a midfielder for Club Atlético Colegiales.

== Career ==
Primera B Metropolitana side Colegiales were Resquín's first senior club. He made his professional bow in April 2013 against Defensores de Belgrano, featuring for the final four minutes of a 1–2 win. Resquín's first goal arrived on 23 August 2015 during a victory away to Deportivo Merlo. After one goal in forty-three matches in his first six seasons, he departed Colegiales at the end of the 2017–18 campaign; which he was selected twenty-five times in and netted two goals. On 30 June 2018, Resquín joined Brown of Primera B Nacional. His first goal came in his third appearance, arriving on 1 September against Olimpo.

== Career statistics ==
As of 1 December 2018.

Club statistics
Club	Season	League			Cup (Note: Includes the Copa Argentina)		League Cup		Continental		Other		Total	
Club	Season	Division	Apps	Goals	Apps	Goals	Apps	Goals	Apps	Goals	Apps	Goals	Apps	Goals
Colegiales	2012–13	Primera B Metropolitana	1	0	0	0	—		—		0	0	1	0
Colegiales	2013–14	Primera B Metropolitana	7	0	0	0	—		—		0	0	7	0
Colegiales	2014	Primera B Metropolitana	0	0	0	0	—		—		0	0	0	0
Colegiales	2015	Primera B Metropolitana	17	1	0	0	—		—		0	0	17	1
Colegiales	2016	Primera B Metropolitana	9	0	0	0	—		—		0	0	9	0
Colegiales	2016–17	Primera B Metropolitana	9	0	0	0	—		—		0	0	9	0
Colegiales	2017–18	Primera B Metropolitana	25	2	0	0	—		—		0	0	25	2
Colegiales	Total		68	3	0	0	—		—		0	0	68	3
Brown	2018–19	Primera B Nacional	5	1	1	0	—		—		0	0	6	1
Career total			73	4	1	0	—		—		0	0	74	4
