= Francisco Gil (footballer) =

Argentine footballer

Personal information
- Date of birth: 3 May 2000 (age 26)
- Place of birth: Argentina
- Height: 1.79 m (5 ft 10 1/2 in)
- Position: Forward

Team information
- Current team: Brown

Senior career*
Years	Team	Apps	(Gls)
2016–	Brown	1	(0)
2019–2020	→ Dock Sud (loan)	4	(0)
- * Club domestic league appearances and goals as of 13:52, 27 August 2020 (UTC)

Francisco Gil (born 3 May 2000) is an Argentine professional footballer who plays as a forward for Brown.

== Career ==
Gil's senior career began with Brown. He was promoted into the Primera B Nacional club's first-team during the 2016–17 campaign, appearing as an unused substitute in matches with All Boys, Atlético Paraná and Guillermo Brown. Gil was named as a substitute against Ferro Carril Oeste on 8 July 2017, subsequently coming on for Brian Gómez after eighty-two minutes for his professional debut at the age of seventeen. In July 2019, Gil was loaned to Primera C Metropolitana side Dock Sud. He made four appearances for them.

== Career statistics ==
As of 27 August 2020.

Club statistics
Club	Season	League			Cup		League Cup		Continental		Other		Total	
Club	Season	Division	Apps	Goals	Apps	Goals	Apps	Goals	Apps	Goals	Apps	Goals	Apps	Goals
Brown	2016–17	Primera B Nacional	1	0	0	0	—		—		0	0	1	0
Brown	2017–18	Primera B Nacional	0	0	0	0	—		—		0	0	0	0
Brown	2018–19	Primera B Nacional	0	0	0	0	—		—		0	0	0	0
Brown	2019–20	Primera B Nacional	0	0	0	0	—		—		0	0	0	0
Brown	Total		1	0	0	0	—		—		0	0	1	0
Dock Sud (loan)	2019–20	Primera C Metropolitana	4	0	0	0	—		—		0	0	4	0
Career total			5	0	0	0	—		—		0	0	5	0
