= Leonardo Zaragoza =

Argentine footballer

Personal information
- Full name: Leonardo Facundo Zaragoza
- Date of birth: 4 June 1992 (age 34)
- Place of birth: Solano, Argentina
- Height: 1.80 m (5 ft 11 in)
- Position: Right-back

Team information
- Current team: Brown de Adrogué

Youth career
- Almirante Brown
- Independiente
- Huracán

Senior career*
Years	Team	Apps	(Gls)
2011–2015	Huracán	16	(0)
2015–2016	Estudiantes	33	(0)
2016–2019	Brown de Adrogué	60	(0)
2019–2021	Estudiantes BA	9	(0)
2021	Temperley	9	(0)
2022–	Brown de Adrogué	22	(0)
- * Club domestic league appearances and goals as of 17:53, 3 August 2022 (UTC)

Leonardo Facundo Zaragoza (born 4 June 1992) is an Argentine professional footballer who plays as a right-back for Brown de Adrogué.

== Career ==
Zaragoza had youth spells with Almirante Brown, Independiente and Huracán, making his debut for the latter in the Copa Argentina against Excursionistas on 30 November. His Primera B Nacional bow arrived in March 2013 during a draw with Instituto, which was the first of fifteen appearances across the 2012–13, 2013–14 and 2014 seasons. Huracán won promotion to the Argentine Primera División in 2015, with Zaragoza subsequently being selected in four top-flight fixtures under manager Néstor Apuzzo. On 2 July 2015, Zaragoza joined Primera B Metropolitana side Estudiantes. Thirty-five appearances followed for them.

July 2016 saw Brown of Primera B Nacional sign Zaragoza. He made his debut in the club's home league opener versus Flandria on 3 September.

== Career statistics ==
As of 28 November 2018.

Club statistics
Club	Season	League			Cup (Note: Includes the Copa Argentina)		League Cup		Continental (Note: Includes the Copa Libertadores)		Other		Total	
Club	Season	Division	Apps	Goals	Apps	Goals	Apps	Goals	Apps	Goals	Apps	Goals	Apps	Goals
Huracán	2011–12	Primera B Nacional	0	0	1	0	—		—		0	0	1	0
Huracán	2012–13	Primera B Nacional	3	0	1	0	—		—		0	0	4	0
Huracán	2013–14	Primera B Nacional	7	0	1	0	—		—		0	0	8	0
Huracán	2014	Primera B Nacional	2	0	1	0	—		—		0	0	3	0
Huracán	2015	Primera División	4	0	0	0	—		0	0	0	0	4	0
Huracán	Total		16	0	4	0	—		0	0	0	0	20	0
Estudiantes	2015	Primera B Metropolitana	18	0	0	0	—		—		2 (Note: One appearance in the 2015 Primera B Metropolitana play-offs)	0	20	0
Estudiantes	2016	Primera B Metropolitana	15	0	0	0	—		—		0	0	15	0
Estudiantes	Total		33	0	0	0	—		—		2	0	35	0
Brown	2016–17	Primera B Nacional	31	0	0	0	—		—		0	0	31	0
Brown	2017–18	Primera B Nacional	9	0	0	0	—		—		0	0	9	0
Brown	2018–19	Primera B Nacional	7	0	2	0	—		—		0	0	9	0
Brown	Total		47	0	2	0	—		—		0	0	49	0
Career total			96	0	6	0	—		0	0	2	0	104	0

== Honours ==
Huracán

- Primera B Nacional: 2013–14
