= Matías Linas =

Argentine footballer

Personal information
- Full name: Matías Alejo Linas
- Date of birth: 8 June 1993 (age 33)
- Place of birth: Remedios de Escalada, Argentina
- Height: 1.80 m (5 ft 11 in)
- Position: Forward

Team information
- Current team: Deportivo Armenio

Youth career
- Lanús

Senior career*
Years	Team	Apps	(Gls)
2012–2016	Lanús	0	(0)
2014–2015	→ Los Andes (loan)	11	(1)
2016–2019	Los Andes	87	(17)
2019–2020	Brown de Adrogué	12	(1)
2020–2021	Los Andes	5	(1)
2021	Güemes	4	(0)
2022–	Deportivo Armenio	1	(0)
- * Club domestic league appearances and goals as of 18:40, 29 June 2022 (UTC)

Matías Alejo Linas (born 8 June 1993) is an Argentine professional footballer who plays as a forward for Deportivo Armenio.

== Career ==
Linas is a product of Lanús' system. His only involvement with their first-team arrived in June 2012 when he was an unused substitute for a goalless draw with Newell's Old Boys in the Primera División. In July 2014, Linas was loaned to Los Andes in Primera B Metropolitana. Three substitute appearances followed in 2014, which concluded with promotion to Primera B Nacional. He remained on loan for the succeeding season, scoring on his first start on 1 August 2015 versus Juventud Unida. Los Andes signed Linas permanently in 2016. Sixteen goals came across his next sixty-nine games, including a hat-trick over Villa Dálmine.

== Career statistics ==
As of 18 February 2019.

Appearances and goals by club, season and competition
Club	Season	League			Cup		Continental		Other		Total	
Club	Season	Division	Apps	Goals	Apps	Goals	Apps	Goals	Apps	Goals	Apps	Goals
Lanús	2011–12	Primera División	0	0	0	0	—		0	0	0	0
Lanús	2012–13	Primera División	0	0	0	0	—		0	0	0	0
Lanús	2013–14	Primera División	0	0	0	0	—		0	0	0	0
Lanús	2014	Primera División	0	0	0	0	—		0	0	0	0
Lanús	2015	Primera División	0	0	0	0	—		0	0	0	0
Lanús	Total		0	0	0	0	—		0	0	0	0
Los Andes (loan)	2014	Primera B Metropolitana	3	0	0	0	—		0	0	3	0
Los Andes (loan)	2015	Primera B Nacional	8	1	0	0	—		0	0	8	1
Los Andes	2016	Primera B Nacional	20	8	0	0	—		0	0	20	8
Los Andes	2016–17	Primera B Nacional	31	6	2	1	—		0	0	33	7
Los Andes	2017–18	Primera B Nacional	16	1	0	0	—		0	0	16	1
Los Andes	2018–19	Primera B Nacional	3	0	0	0	—		0	0	3	0
Los Andes	Total		81	16	2	1	—		0	0	83	17
Career total			81	16	2	1	—		0	0	83	17
