= Fernando Cosciuc =

Argentine professional footballer

Personal information
- Full name: Fernando Cosciuc
- Date of birth: 19 February 1998 (age 28)
- Place of birth: Rosario, Argentina
- Height: 1.82 m (5 ft 11 1/2 in)
- Position: Centre-back

Team information
- Current team: Villa Dálmine

Youth career
- Huracán

Senior career*
Years	Team	Apps	(Gls)
2017–2022	Huracán	2	(0)
2019	→ Brown de Adrogué (loan)	1	(0)
2020–2021	→ San Martín SJ (loan)	15	(0)
2022–	Deportivo Maipú	12	(1)
2023–	→ Villa Dálmine (loan)	19	(0)
- * Club domestic league appearances and goals as of 19 November 2023

Fernando Cosciuc (born 19 February 1998) is an Argentine professional footballer who plays as a centre-back for Huracán.

== Career ==
Cosciuc first appeared in the first-team of Huracán in 2017, being an unused substitute on 23 April during a draw against Estudiantes in the Argentine Primera División. On 28 May, Cosciuc made his professional debut after playing eighty minutes in a 1–1 home draw with Boca Juniors on 27 May.

In October 2021, Cosciuc suffered an anterior cruciate ligament injury, which would keep him out for at least six months. On 9 June 2022, Cosciuc joined Primera Nacional side Deportivo Maipú on a deal until the end of 2024.

== Career statistics ==
As of 10 May 2018.

Club statistics
Club	Season	League			Cup (Note: Includes the Copa Argentina)		League Cup		Continental (Note: Includes the Copa Sudamericana)		Other		Total	
Club	Season	Division	Apps	Goals	Apps	Goals	Apps	Goals	Apps	Goals	Apps	Goals	Apps	Goals
Huracán	2016–17	Primera División	1	0	0	0	—		0	0	0	0	1	0
Huracán	2017–18	Primera División	0	0	0	0	—		1 (Note: One appearance in 2017 Copa Sudamericana)	0	0	0	1	0
Career total			1	0	0	0	—		1	0	0	0	2	0
