= Germán Lesman =

Argentine footballer

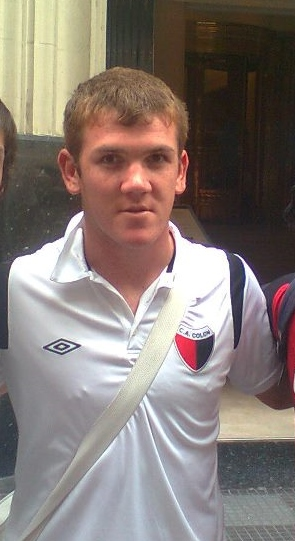
- Lesman in 2013

Personal information
- Full name: Germán Lesman
- Date of birth: 8 September 1990 (age 36)
- Place of birth: Esperanza, Argentina
- Height: 1.81 m (5 ft 11 in)
- Position: Forward

Team information
- Current team: Güemes

Youth career
- San Lorenzo FBC
- Colón

Senior career*
Years	Team	Apps	(Gls)
	San Lorenzo FBC	–	(–)
2010–2014	Colón	18	(0)
2012	→ Rangers (loan)	4	(0)
2012	→ Rangers B (loan)	6	(2)
2012–2013	→ Tiro Federal (loan)	15	(0)
2013–2014	→ Sportivo Rivadavia (loan)	24	(6)
2014	Independiente Chivilcoy	13	(3)
2015	Defensores de Belgrano VR	32	(18)
2016	All Boys	21	(17)
2016–2019	Huracán	3	(0)
2017	→ Instituto (loan)	4	(0)
2018	→ Brown de Adrogué (loan)	8	(2)
2019	→ Villa Dálmine (loan)	11	(3)
2019–2020	Villa Dálmine	11	(1)
2020–2021	Atlético Rafaela	14	(0)
2021–2022	Central Norte	41	(18)
2023	Agropecuario	11	(1)
2024–2025	Central Norte	39	(14)
2025–	Güemes	8	(1)
- * Club domestic league appearances and goals as of 17:16, 13 August 2025 (UTC)

Germán Alejandro Lesman (born 8 September 1990) is an Argentine footballer who plays as a forward for Güemes.

== Career ==
Lesman started his career with club San Lorenzo FBC from Esperanza, Argentina, at the age of 17 in the Liga Esperancina. At the Argentine Primera División, he made his debut with Colón on 7 August 2010.

In 2012, he moved on loan to Chilean club Rangers de Talca in the top level. He also represented the B-team in the Segunda División Profesional.

In 2024, Lesman returned to Central Norte from Agropecuario after his stint with them in 2021–22.
