= Nahuel Rodríguez (footballer, born 1996) =

Argentine footballer

Personal information
- Full name: Nahuel Jonathan Rodríguez González
- Date of birth: 18 March 1996 (age 30)
- Place of birth: Ciudadela, Argentina
- Height: 1.67 m (5 ft 5 1/2 in)
- Position: Midfielder

Youth career
- Argentinos Juniors

Senior career*
Years	Team	Apps	(Gls)
2015–2020	Argentinos Juniors	7	(0)
2017	→ Estudiantes BA (loan)	8	(0)
2018	→ Deportivo Capiatá (loan)	1	(0)
2019–2020	→ Brown de Adrogué (loan)	10	(0)
2020–2021	Nueva Chicago	6	(0)
2021	Flandria	3	(0)
2022	Brown de Adrogué	1	(0)
- * Club domestic league appearances and goals as of 18:27, 29 June 2022 (UTC)

Nahuel Jonathan Rodríguez González (born 18 March 1996) is an Argentine professional footballer who plays as a midfielder.

== Career ==
Rodríguez's first senior career club was Argentinos Juniors, who he started appearing for during the 2015 Argentine Primera División season. Manager Néstor Gorosito picked Rodríguez three times that campaign, which included his professional bow during a 1–0 defeat to Racing Club on 26 September. In May 2017, Estudiantes of Primera B Metropolitana signed Rodríguez on loan. He remained until the end of 2017, featuring in both 2016–17 and 2017–18. Soon after returning to Argentinos Juniors, Rodríguez was loaned out again as he joined Paraguayan Primera División side Deportivo Capiatá.

== Career statistics ==
As of 9 October 2018.

Club statistics
Club	Season	League			Cup (Note: Includes the Copa Argentina and Copa Paraguay)		League Cup		Continental		Other		Total	
Club	Season	Division	Apps	Goals	Apps	Goals	Apps	Goals	Apps	Goals	Apps	Goals	Apps	Goals
Argentinos Juniors	2015	Argentine Primera División	2	0	0	0	—		—		1 (Note: One appearance in the 2015 Argentine Primera División play-offs)	0	3	0
Argentinos Juniors	2016	Argentine Primera División	5	0	0	0	—		—		0	0	5	0
Argentinos Juniors	2016–17	Argentine Primera División	0	0	1	0	—		—		0	0	1	0
Argentinos Juniors	2017–18	Argentine Primera División	0	0	0	0	—		—		0	0	0	0
Argentinos Juniors	2018–19	Argentine Primera División	0	0	0	0	—		—		0	0	0	0
Argentinos Juniors	Total		7	0	1	0	—		—		1	0	9	0
Estudiantes (loan)	2016–17	Primera B Metropolitana	4	0	1	0	—		—		3 (Note: Three appearances in the 2016–17 Primera B Metropolitana play-offs)	0	8	0
Estudiantes (loan)	2017–18	Primera B Metropolitana	4	0	0	0	—		—		0	0	4	0
Estudiantes (loan)	Total		8	0	1	0	—		—		3	0	12	0
Deportivo Capiatá (loan)	2018	Paraguayan Primera División	1	0	0	0	—		—		0	0	1	0
Career total			16	0	2	0	—		—		4	0	22	0
