= Mauricio Carrasco =

Argentine footballer (born 1987)

Personal information
- Full name: Mauricio Nicolás Carrasco
- Date of birth: 24 September 1987 (age 39)
- Place of birth: Neuquén, Argentina
- Height: 1.73 m (5 ft 8 in)
- Position: Forward

Youth career
- –2008: Estudiantes

Senior career*
Years	Team	Apps	(Gls)
2008–2015	Estudiantes	12	(0)
2009–2010	→ Quilmes (loan)	35	(9)
2011–2012	→ Aldosivi (loan)	31	(7)
2012–2013	→ Atlético Patronato (loan)	29	(11)
2013–2014	→ Asteras Tripolis (loan)	34	(11)
2015	Atromitos	11	(0)
2015–2016	Nueva Chicago	14	(3)
2016–2018	Atlético Patronato	18	(3)
2018	Boca Unidos	5	(0)
2018	Royal Pari	9	(2)
2019–2020	Brown de Adrogué	6	(0)
2021	Gimnasia y Tiro	18	(2)
- * Club domestic league appearances and goals as of 18:35, 29 June 2022 (UTC)

Mauricio Nicolás Carrasco (born 24 September 1987) is an Argentine footballer who plays as a forward.

== Football career ==
Carrasco started his football career when he joined Estudiantes de la Plata youth academy. He was promoted to the senior squad in 2008. In 2009, he joined Quilmes on a one-year loan. He then rejoined his club but he didn't play any match. He went again on loan, this time to Aldovisi where he played thirty one times and scored seven goals. The following season would find him again away from Estudiantes as he went on loan to Patronato. He made twenty nine appearances and his scored eleven times, which is his own personal record of goals in a season. In 2013 Carrasco, move on loan to the Super League Greece club Asteras Tripolis He played in thirty four matches and scored eleven goals, tying his own record of goals in a season. In his contract there was also a €360.000 fee if Asteras wanted to buy the player. Although, Asteras desire to buy Carrasco, Estudiantes insisted on the price that it was set on the contract and Asteras didn't make an official bid for the player.

Carrasco returned to Estudiantes after his successful loan spell in Greece and so far he played in five games but he hasn't score yet, any goals.

== Honours ==
=== Estudiantes ===
- Primera División (2): 2007 Apertura, x1 Runners-up 2010 Clausura, 2011 Apertura
- Copa Libertadores (1): 2009
- Recopa Sudamericana: x1 Runners-up 2010 Recopa Sudamericana
- FIFA Club World Cup: x1 Runners-up 2009 FIFA Club World Cup
