= Ezequiel Bonacorso =

Argentine professional footballer

Personal information
- Full name: Nahir Ezequiel Bonacorso
- Date of birth: 9 August 1993 (age 33)
- Place of birth: Mendoza, Argentina
- Height: 1.74 m (5 ft 8 1/2 in)
- Position: Right-back

Team information
- Current team: Estudiantes RC

Senior career*
Years	Team	Apps	(Gls)
2015–2017	Godoy Cruz	9	(0)
2017–2018	Instituto	22	(1)
2018–2019	Mitre	4	(0)
2019–2020	Brown de Adrogué	19	(1)
2020–2021	Deportivo Maipú	40	(0)
2022–	Estudiantes RC	19	(0)
- * Club domestic league appearances and goals as of 15:41, 23 June 2022 (UTC)

Nahir Ezequiel Bonacorso (born 9 August 1993) is an Argentine professional footballer who plays as a right-back for Estudiantes RC.

== Career ==
Bonacorso's first club were Godoy Cruz of the Primera División. He was first an unused substitute for a match with Estudiantes on 21 February 2015, before making his senior debut on 30 April during a home victory against Sarmiento. Ten appearances followed in all competitions over the next two years with Godoy Cruz, including one in the 2017 Copa Libertadores versus Atlético Mineiro. On 31 July 2017, Bonacorso joined Primera B Nacional's Instituto. He scored his first career goal in a draw with Villa Dálmine in February 2018. Mitre signed Bonacorso on 17 June. However, in March 2019, he was sacked after insulting a fan on Instagram.

== Career statistics ==
As of 25 March 2019.

Club statistics
Club	Season	League			Cup		Continental		Other		Total	
Club	Season	Division	Apps	Goals	Apps	Goals	Apps	Goals	Apps	Goals	Apps	Goals
Godoy Cruz	2015	Primera División	4	0	0	0	—		0	0	4	0
Godoy Cruz	2016	Primera División	0	0	0	0	—		0	0	0	0
Godoy Cruz	2016–17	Primera División	5	0	1	0	1 (Note: Appearance(s) in the Copa Libertadores)	0	0	0	7	0
Godoy Cruz	Total		9	0	1	0	1	0	0	0	11	0
Instituto	2017–18	Primera B Nacional	22	1	1	0	—		0	0	23	1
Mitre	2018–19	Primera B Nacional	4	0	0	0	—		0	0	4	0
Career total			35	1	2	0	1	0	0	0	38	1
