= Alberto Stegman =

Argentine footballer

Personal information
- Full name: Alberto César Stegman
- Date of birth: 1 February 1994 (age 32)
- Place of birth: Buenos Aires, Argentina
- Height: 1.83 m (6 ft 0 in)
- Position: Left-back

Youth career
- San Lorenzo
- Tigre

Senior career*
Years	Team	Apps	(Gls)
2015–2017	Tigre	0	(0)
2016–2017	→ Brown de Adrogué (loan)	12	(0)
2017–2021	Brown de Adrogué	56	(6)
2022	San Telmo	0	(0)
- * Club domestic league appearances and goals as of 23:51, 15 September 2019 (UTC)

Alberto César Stegman (born 1 February 1994) is an Argentine professional footballer who plays as a left-back.

== Career ==
Stegman played for San Lorenzo's academy before joining Tigre. He was an unused substitute for a match with Estudiantes on 13 April 2015 but never made a senior appearance for them. In July 2016, Stegman was loaned to Primera B Nacional's Brown. Twelve appearances followed, which preceded the club signing him permanently on 31 July 2017. He scored his first goal on 15 April 2018 in a win against Santamarina.

In January 2022, Stegman joined San Telmo. However, a week later, his contract was terminated.

== Career statistics ==
As of 28 November 2018.

Club statistics
Club	Season	League			Cup (Note: Includes the Copa Argentina)		League Cup		Continental		Other		Total	
Club	Season	Division	Apps	Goals	Apps	Goals	Apps	Goals	Apps	Goals	Apps	Goals	Apps	Goals
Tigre	2015	Primera División	0	0	0	0	—		—		0	0	0	0
Tigre	2016	Primera División	0	0	0	0	—		—		0	0	0	0
Tigre	2016–17	Primera División	0	0	0	0	—		—		0	0	0	0
Tigre	2017–18	Primera División	0	0	0	0	—		—		0	0	0	0
Tigre	Total		0	0	0	0	—		—		0	0	0	0
Brown (loan)	2016–17	Primera B Nacional	12	0	1	0	—		—		0	0	13	0
Brown	2017–18	Primera B Nacional	15	1	0	0	—		—		3 (Note: Three appearances in the 2017–18 Primera B Nacional play-offs)	1 (Note: One goal in the 2017–18 Primera B Nacional play-offs)	18	2
Brown	2018–19	Primera B Nacional	10	3	3	0	—		—		0	0	13	3
Brown	Total		37	4	4	0	—		—		3	1	44	5
Career total			37	4	4	0	—		—		3	1	44	5
