= Carlos Espínola (footballer, born 1995) =

Argentine footballer

Personal information
- Full name: Carlos Espínola Zapattini
- Date of birth: 22 May 1995 (age 31)
- Place of birth: Buenos Aires, Argentina
- Height: 1.68 m (5 ft 6 in)
- Position: Midfielder

Youth career
- Los Andes

Senior career*
Years	Team	Apps	(Gls)
2016–2020	Los Andes	23	(1)
- * Club domestic league appearances and goals

Carlos Espínola Zapattini (born 22 May 1995) is an Argentine professional footballer who plays as a midfielder.

== Career ==
Espínola began his career in Primera B Nacional with Los Andes. Having been promoted to their senior squad towards the end of the 2016 campaign, Espínola participated in the club's final four fixtures of the season against Villa Dálmine, Ferro Carril Oeste, Instituto and Nueva Chicago as Los Andes finished bottom of the table. Ten appearances later, versus Almagro on 11 February 2018, he scored his opening goal in a 1–1 draw. In June 2020, Espínola was released following the expiration of his contract.

== Career statistics ==
As of 5 July 2020.

Appearances and goals by club, season and competition
Club	Season	League			Cup		Continental		Other		Total	
Club	Season	Division	Apps	Goals	Apps	Goals	Apps	Goals	Apps	Goals	Apps	Goals
Los Andes	2016	Primera B Nacional	4	0	0	0	—		0	0	4	0
Los Andes	2016–17	Primera B Nacional	5	0	0	0	—		0	0	5	0
Los Andes	2017–18	Primera B Nacional	8	0	0	0	—		0	0	8	0
Los Andes	2018–19	Primera B Nacional	5	0	0	0	—		0	0	5	0
Los Andes	2019–20	Primera B Metropolitana	1	0	0	0	—		0	0	1	0
Career total			23	1	0	0	—		0	0	23	1
