= Luciano Nieto =

Argentine footballer

Personal information
- Full name: Luciano Federico Nieto
- Date of birth: January 19, 1991 (age 35)
- Place of birth: Tapiales, Argentina
- Height: 1.78 m (5 ft 10 in)
- Position: Attacking midfielder

Team information
- Current team: Temperley

Senior career*
Years	Team	Apps	(Gls)
2008–2015	Huracán	78	(5)
2013	→ Aragua FC (loan)	17	(5)
2014–2015	→ Estudiantes (loan)	35	(4)
2015–2016	Guillermo Brown	27	(2)
2016–2018	Brown de Adrogué	62	(9)
2018–2019	Sport Boys Warnes	46	(5)
2019–2020	Brown de Adrogué	21	(3)
2020–2022	Chacarita Juniors	33	(5)
2022–2023	Sport Boys	32	(2)
2023–2024	Temperley	39	(4)
2024–2025	Universidad Católica	27	(5)
2025–	Temperley	38	(3)

International career
- Argentina U-17
- Argentina U-20
- * Club domestic league appearances and goals as of 17:46, 20 April 2026 (UTC)

Luciano Federico "Chichón" Nieto (born 19 January 1991) is an Argentinian footballer who plays as an attacking midfielder for Temperley.

== Honours ==
Huracán

- Argentine Primera División Runner-up (1): 2009 Clausura
