= Pablo Vicó =

Argentine footballer and manager (born 1955)

Personal information
- Date of birth: 5 November 1955
- Place of birth: Parque Patricios, Buenos Aires, Argentina
- Position: Forward

Senior career*
| Years | Team | Apps | (Gls) |
| 1979–1982 | Temperley | | |
| 1982–1983 | San Miguel | | |
- Tristán Suárez
- CA Brown

Managerial career
- 2009–2024: CA Brown
- * Club domestic league appearances and goals

Pablo Vicó (born 5 November 1955) is an Argentine footballer and manager, who led CA Brown for 15 years, from 2009 until 2024, which is one of the longest managerial reigns in football history.

== Playing career ==
Born on 5 November 1955 in the Buenos Aires neighbourhood of Parque Patricios, Vicó had a short footballing career, scoring 11 goals in 48 matches for CA Temperley, from which he joined San Miguel, with whom he wore the number 9 in the 1982–83 season in the Primera C, being a lively player in the box, although he sometimes dropped back to get closer to the ball. He also played for Tristán Suárez and CA Brown, where he retired.

After his playing, he worked at a hospital, and in the late 1980s, he became a member of CA Brown, whose crest he tattooed on his arm. In the late 1990s, Brown took the significant step of building a boarding house for its players, which required a night watchman, a position that the club's president decided to give to Vicó, a "longtime member" of the club, who was quick to accept the offer. Having left his job at the hospital, he began living at the club in 1999, first in a room in the boarding house, and later in a private room belonging to the stadium itself.

== Managerial career ==
At the boarding house, Vicó strove to ensure that the youth lacked nothing, thus creating a close bond with the youth teams, so much so that he eventually became their coach, where he did well, so he was then promoted to the first team, but only as an interim, overseeing a total of eight matches in two separate spells in the B Metropolitana in the 2004–05 and 2005–06 seasons, with a record of 2 wins, 1 draw, and 5 losses. Following Juan Carlos Kopriva's departure in 2009, the 54-year-old Vicó was given a chance to become the full-time coach of the club's first team. The fans quickly nicknamed him Don Ramón because he resembled the character of the same name from El Chavo del Ocho. He was noted for his obsession over details, with some comparing him to the likes of Marcelo Bielsa.

Vicó made his debut as a coach on 21 March 2009, in a B Metropolitana match against Sportivo Italiano, which ended in a 1–1 draw. In 2013, he led his side to promotion to Primera Nacional, the second division of the Argentine football league system, and even though they were relegated the following year, the club achieved another promotion in 2015, thanks to a last-minute goal against Deportivo Morón. In 2018, his team eliminated Independiente on penalties in the round of 32 of the Copa Argentina.

Vicó was Brown's coach for 15 years, from 2009 until 2024, thus becoming the longest-serving coach not only in the history of the club, but also in the history of Argentine football, surpassing Victorio Spinetto's record of 14 consecutive years with Vélez from 1942 to 1956. On 21 March 2024, he became the first coach in Argentine football to complete 15 uninterrupted years in charge of a club. A few weeks later, on 1 May, it was confirmed that he would not continue at the club due to a series of "poor results", picking up only 8 points in 13 matches and only one victory, which came against Almirante Brown. In total, Vicó oversaw Brown in 563 matches, with a record of 203 wins, 183 draws, and 177 losses, achieving two promotions. At the time of his exit, he was the 5th longest-serving manager in the world.

== Legacy ==
In addition to having the club's buffet named after him, Vicó also has a street named after him in San Clemente del Tuyú, and he even wrote a biographical book.

== Career statistics ==
=== Statistics as a coach ===
Updated according to the last match directed on 15 October 2023.

| Team | Division | Season | League | | | | Cup (Note: Including Copa Argentina.) | | | | International (Note: Including Copa Libertadores and Copa Sudamericana.) | | | | Others (Note: Including: Reduced by promotion.) | | | | Totals | | | | |
| Team | Division | Season | P | W | D | L | P | W | D | L | P | W | D | L | P | W | D | L | P | W | D | L | Performance |
|---|---|---|---|---|---|---|---|---|---|---|---|---|---|---|---|---|---|---|---|---|---|---|---|
| Brown de Adrogué; Argentina | 3.ª | 2004 (e) (Note: Vicó managed some matches as caretaker coach in the 2004–05 season after the departure of Vicente Stagliano and the arrival of Marcelo Franchini.) | Unknown | | | | - | - | - | - | - | - | - | - | - | - | - | - | Unknown | | | | |
| Brown de Adrogué; Argentina | 3.ª | 2006 (e) (Note: Vicó managed some matches as caretaker coach in the 2005–06 season after the departure of Óscar Martínez and the arrival of Miguel Ángel Lemme.) | Unknown | | | | - | - | - | - | - | - | - | - | - | - | - | - | Unknown | | | | |
| Brown de Adrogué; Argentina | 3.ª | 2009 | 12 | 4 | 4 | 4 | - | - | - | - | - | - | - | - | - | - | - | - | 12 | 4 | 4 | 4 | 44.44% |
| Brown de Adrogué; Argentina | 3.ª | 2009–10 | 40 | 14 | 12 | 14 | - | - | - | - | - | - | - | - | - | - | - | - | 40 | 14 | 12 | 14 | 45% |
| Brown de Adrogué; Argentina | 3.ª | 2010–11 | 42 | 19 | 13 | 10 | - | - | - | - | - | - | - | - | 2 | 0 | 1 | 1 | 44 | 19 | 14 | 11 | 53.79% |
| Brown de Adrogué; Argentina | 3.ª | 2011–12 | 40 | 19 | 12 | 9 | 1 | 0 | 0 | 1 | - | - | - | - | 1 | 0 | 0 | 1 | 42 | 19 | 12 | 11 | 54.76% |
| Brown de Adrogué; Argentina | 3.ª | 2012–13 | 40 | 16 | 15 | 9 | 3 | 2 | 0 | 1 | - | - | - | - | 4 | 1 | 2 | 1 | 47 | 19 | 17 | 11 | 52.49% |
| Brown de Adrogué; Argentina | 2.ª | 2013–14 | 42 | 13 | 11 | 18 | 2 | 1 | 1 | 0 | - | - | - | - | - | - | - | - | 44 | 14 | 12 | 18 | 40.91% |
| Brown de Adrogué; Argentina | 3.ª | 2014 | 20 | 4 | 7 | 9 | - | - | - | - | - | - | - | - | - | - | - | - | 20 | 4 | 7 | 9 | 31.67% |
| Brown de Adrogué; Argentina | 3.ª | 2015 | 42 | 23 | 12 | 7 | 1 | 0 | 0 | 1 | - | - | - | - | - | - | - | - | 43 | 23 | 12 | 8 | 62.79% |
| Brown de Adrogué; Argentina | 2.ª | 2016 | 21 | 6 | 10 | 5 | 1 | 0 | 0 | 1 | - | - | - | - | - | - | - | - | 22 | 6 | 10 | 6 | 42.42% |
| Brown de Adrogué; Argentina | 2.ª | 2016–17 | 44 | 18 | 11 | 15 | 1 | 0 | 0 | 1 | - | - | - | - | - | - | - | - | 45 | 18 | 11 | 16 | 48.15% |
| Brown de Adrogué; Argentina | 2.ª | 2017–18 | 24 | 10 | 7 | 7 | 3 | 0 | 2 | 1 | - | - | - | - | 1 | 0 | 1 | 0 | 28 | 10 | 10 | 8 | 47.61% |
| Brown de Adrogué; Argentina | 2.ª | 2018–19 | 24 | 9 | 9 | 6 | - | - | - | - | - | - | - | - | 2 | 1 | 0 | 1 | 26 | 10 | 9 | 7 | 38.6% |
| Brown de Adrogué; Argentina | 2.ª | 2019–20 | 21 | 5 | 9 | 7 | - | - | - | - | - | - | - | - | - | - | - | - | 21 | 5 | 9 | 7 | 38.1% |
| Brown de Adrogué; Argentina | 2.ª | 2020 | 7 | 2 | 3 | 2 | - | - | - | - | - | - | - | - | - | - | - | - | 7 | 2 | 3 | 2 | 42.86% |
| Brown de Adrogué; Argentina | 2.ª | 2021 | 34 | 12 | 11 | 11 | - | - | - | - | - | - | - | - | - | - | - | - | 34 | 12 | 11 | 11 | 46.07% |
| Brown de Adrogué; Argentina | 2.ª | 2022 | 36 | 11 | 11 | 14 | 1 | 0 | 0 | 1 | - | - | - | - | - | - | - | - | 37 | 11 | 11 | 15 | 39.64% |
| Brown de Adrogué; Argentina | 2.ª | 2023 | 34 | 11 | 14 | 9 | - | - | - | - | - | - | - | - | - | - | - | - | 34 | 11 | 14 | 9 | 46.08% |
| Brown de Adrogué; Argentina | 2.ª | 2024 | 13 | 1 | 5 | 7 | - | - | - | - | - | - | - | - | - | - | - | - | 13 | 1 | 5 | 7 | 20,51% |
| Brown de Adrogué; Argentina | Total | | 536 | 197 | 176 | 163 | 13 | 3 | 3 | 7 | 0 | 0 | 0 | 0 | 10 | 2 | 4 | 4 | 559 | 202 | 183 | 174 | 47.05% |
| Total in his career | | | 536 | 197 | 176 | 163 | 13 | 3 | 3 | 7 | 0 | 0 | 0 | 0 | 10 | 2 | 4 | 4 | 559 | 202 | 183 | 174 | 47.05% |

== See also ==
- List of longest managerial reigns in association football
