= Valentín Otondo =

Argentine footballer

Personal information
- Date of birth: 20 August 1999 (age 27)
- Place of birth: Pigüé, Argentina
- Position: Midfielder

Team information
- Current team: Liniers Bahía Blanca

Youth career
- Sarmiento de Pigüé
- 2017–2018: Olimpo

Senior career*
Years	Team	Apps	(Gls)
2018–2019	Olimpo	1	(0)
2019	Brown de Adrogué	0	(0)
2020–2021	Huracán Ingeniero White	4	(0)
2022–	Liniers Bahía Blanca	9	(0)
- * Club domestic league appearances and goals as of 17:52, 31 March 2024 (UTC)

Valentín Otondo (born 20 August 1999) is an Argentine professional footballer who plays as a central midfielder for Liniers Bahía Blanca.

== Career ==
Otondo started his career with Sarmiento de Pigüé, prior to moving to Olimpo in 2017. He was an unused substitute twice for the club during the 2017–18 season in the Primera División, for fixtures with Atlético Tucumán and Talleres in May 2018 as they were relegated. Before making his Primera B Nacional bow against Ferro Carril Oeste in September, Otondo made two appearances in the Copa Argentina in July versus Aldosivi and Gimnasia y Esgrima respectively. Ahead of 2019–20, following Olimpo's relegation to Torneo Federal A, Otondo departed for Brown on 14 August 2019.

In February 2020, Otondo joined Huracán Ingeniero White. In March 2022, he signed with Liniers Bahía Blanca.

== Career statistics ==
As of 15 August 2019.

Appearances and goals by club, season and competition
Club	Season	League			Cup		League Cup		Continental		Other		Total	
Club	Season	Division	Apps	Goals	Apps	Goals	Apps	Goals	Apps	Goals	Apps	Goals	Apps	Goals
Olimpo	2017–18	Primera División	0	0	0	0	—		—		0	0	0	0
Olimpo	2018–19	Primera B Nacional	1	0	2	0	—		—		0	0	3	0
Olimpo	Total		1	0	2	0	—		—		0	0	3	0
Brown	2019–20	Primera B Nacional	0	0	0	0	—		—		0	0	0	0
Career total			1	0	2	0	—		—		0	0	3	0
