= Iván Silva (footballer, born 1994) =

Argentine footballer

Personal information
- Full name: Iván Ezequiel Silva
- Date of birth: 22 January 1994 (age 32)
- Place of birth: Villa Gobernador Gálvez, Argentina
- Height: 1.80 m (5 ft 11 in)
- Position: Midfielder

Team information
- Current team: Zakynthos
- Number: 19

Youth career
- Newell's Old Boys

Senior career*
Years	Team	Apps	(Gls)
2014–2020	Newell's Old Boys	6	(0)
2016–2017	→ Argentinos Juniors (loan)	3	(0)
2017–2018	→ Guillermo Brown (loan)	18	(1)
2018–2020	→ Brown (loan)	26	(1)
2020–2021	Cipolletti	5	(0)
2021–2022	Boca Unidos	29	(1)
2022–2023	Panachaiki	8	(0)
2023–2024	Panthrakikos	18	(16)
2024–	Zakynthos		
- * Club domestic league appearances and goals as of 18:29, 23 October 2024 (UTC)

Iván Ezequiel Silva (born 22 January 1994) is an Argentine professional footballer who plays as a central midfielder for Super League Greece 2 club Zakynthos.

== Career ==
Newell's Old Boys became Silva's first senior club 2014, he made his professional debut on 25 October during a draw against Godoy Cruz. He subsequently made six first-team appearances over the course of 2014, 2015 and 2016 for Newell's Old Boys. In July 2016, Silva joined Primera B Nacional's Argentinos Juniors on loan. He went on to make three appearances in the club's promotion-winning campaign of 2016–17. He returned to Newell's Old Boys in July 2017, but was soon loaned out again to Primera B Nacional side Guillermo Brown. He scored on his debut, in a 3–0 win over Flandria on 8 October.

Brown was Silva's third career loan destination, with him joining the Primera B Nacional outfit on 23 July 2018. He remained for two years, appearing in twenty-eight fixtures and scoring one goal; versus Defensores de Belgrano.

== Career statistics ==
As of 5 September 2020.

Club statistics
Club	Season	League			Cup		League Cup		Continental		Other		Total	
Club	Season	Division	Apps	Goals	Apps	Goals	Apps	Goals	Apps	Goals	Apps	Goals	Apps	Goals
Newell's Old Boys	2014	Primera División	4	0	0	0	—		—		0	0	4	0
Newell's Old Boys	2015	Primera División	0	0	0	0	—		—		0	0	0	0
Newell's Old Boys	2016	Primera División	2	0	1	0	—		—		0	0	3	0
Newell's Old Boys	2016–17	Primera División	0	0	0	0	—		—		0	0	0	0
Newell's Old Boys	2017–18	Primera División	0	0	0	0	—		0	0	0	0	0	0
Newell's Old Boys	2018–19	Primera División	0	0	0	0	—		—		0	0	0	0
Newell's Old Boys	Total		6	0	1	0	—		0	0	0	0	7	0
Argentinos Juniors (loan)	2016–17	Primera B Nacional	3	0	0	0	—		—		0	0	3	0
Guillermo Brown (loan)	2017–18	Primera B Nacional	18	1	0	0	—		—		0	0	18	1
Brown (loan)	2018–19	Primera B Nacional	15	1	1	0	—		—		1 (Note: Appearance(s) in the Primera B Nacional play-offs)	0	17	1
Brown (loan)	2019–20	Primera B Nacional	11	0	0	0	—		—		0	0	11	0
Brown (loan)	Total		26	1	1	0	—		0	0	1	0	28	1
Career total			43	2	2	0	—		0	0	1	0	46	2

== Honours ==
Argentinos Juniors

- Primera B Nacional: 2016–17
