= Matías Ruiz Sosa =

Argentine footballer

Personal information
- Full name: Matías José Ruiz Sosa
- Date of birth: 17 March 1992 (age 34)
- Place of birth: Argentina
- Position: Midfielder

Team information
- Current team: Comunicaciones

Senior career*
Years	Team	Apps	(Gls)
2013–2018	Almagro	85	(6)
2018–2019	Brown de Adrogué	7	(0)
2019–	Comunicaciones	5	(0)
- * Club domestic league appearances and goals as of 00:22, 16 September 2019 (UTC)

Matías José Ruiz Sosa (born 17 March 1992) is an Argentine professional footballer who plays as a midfielder for Comunicaciones.

== Career ==
Ruiz Sosa began playing professionally for Primera B Metropolitana side Almagro in August 2013, with the midfielder making his debut for the club on 14 August during a win away to Comunicaciones; he made twelve further appearances in his first campaign. He netted the opening goals of his career in the 2015 season, with his first arriving against Deportivo Armenio on 8 June; in a year that sealed promotion to Primera B Nacional. His spell with the club lasted a total of five years, with Ruiz Sosa leaving at the conclusion for 2017–18 to join fellow second tier team Brown.

== Career statistics ==
As of 1 December 2018.

Club statistics
Club	Season	League			Cup (Note: Includes the Copa Argentina)		League Cup		Continental		Other		Total	
Club	Season	Division	Apps	Goals	Apps	Goals	Apps	Goals	Apps	Goals	Apps	Goals	Apps	Goals
Almagro	2013–14	Primera B Metropolitana	12	0	1	0	—		—		0	0	13	0
Almagro	2014	Primera B Metropolitana	3	0	0	0	—		—		0	0	3	0
Almagro	2015	Primera B Metropolitana	30	3	0	0	—		—		4 (Note: Four appearances in the 2015 Primera B Metropolitana play-offs)	1 (Note: One goal in the 2015 Primera B Metropolitana play-offs)	34	4
Almagro	2016	Primera B Nacional	15	0	1	0	—		—		0	0	16	0
Almagro	2016–17	Primera B Nacional	16	0	2	0	—		—		0	0	18	0
Almagro	2017–18	Primera B Nacional	9	3	0	0	—		—		0	0	9	3
Almagro	Total		85	6	4	0	—		—		4	1	93	7
Brown	2018–19	Primera B Nacional	3	0	2	0	—		—		0	0	5	0
Career total			88	6	6	0	—		—		4	1	98	7
