= Ignacio Bogino =

Argentine footballer

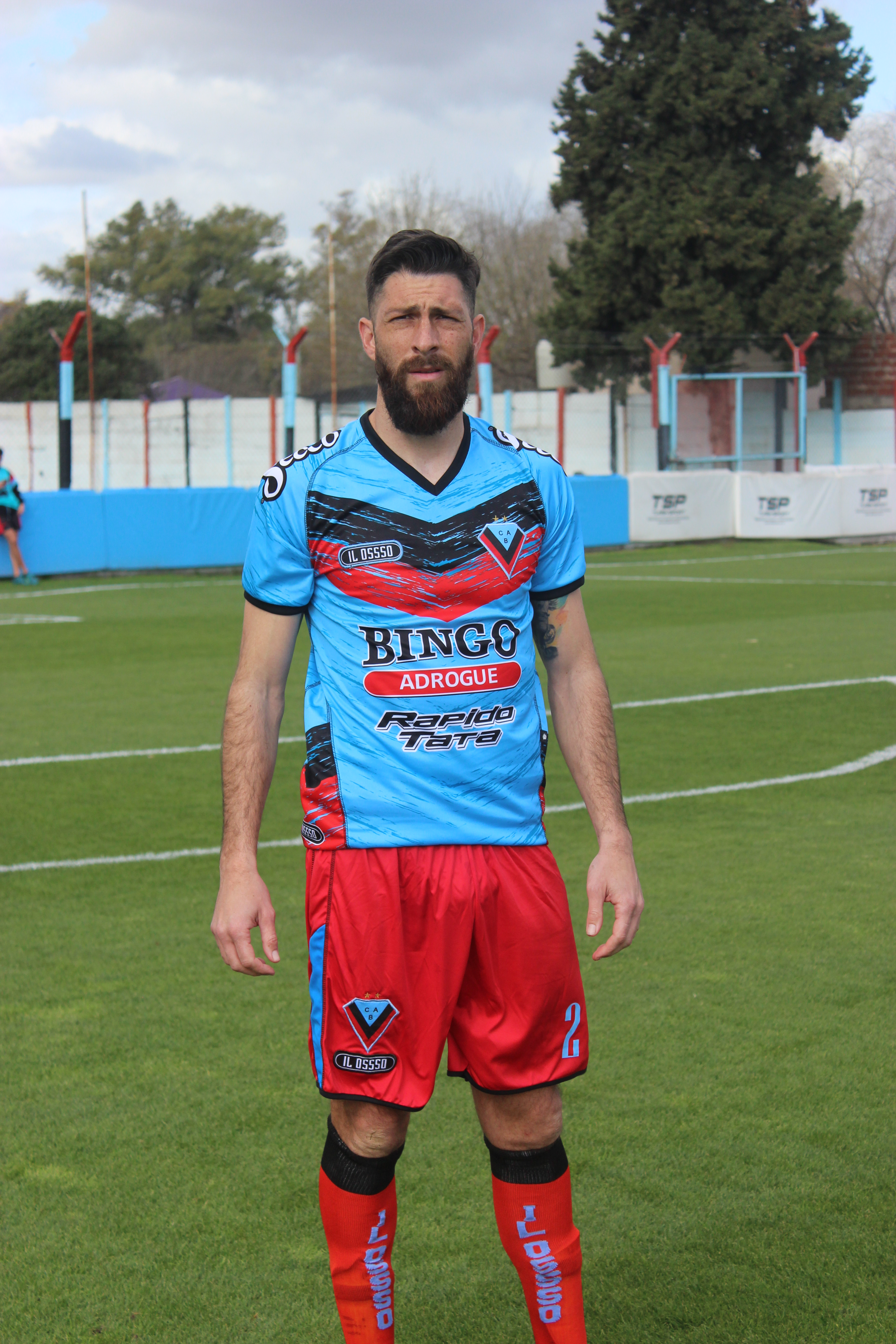

Personal information
- Full name: Ignacio Bogino
- Date of birth: 22 February 1986 (age 40)
- Place of birth: Rosario, Santa Fe, Argentina
- Height: 1.87 m (6 ft 2 in)
- Position: Centre-back

Team information
- Current team: Central Córdoba

Youth career
- Rosario Central

Senior career*
Years	Team	Apps	(Gls)
2007–2010	Rosario Central	19	(0)
2010–2011	Arsenal de Sarandí	6	(0)
2011–2014	Patronato	112	(9)
2014–2018	Temperley	65	(2)
2018–2020	Brown de Adrogué	38	(3)
2021–	Central Córdoba		
- * Club domestic league appearances and goals as of 15:39, 23 June 2022 (UTC)

Ignacio Bogino (born 22 February 1986) is an Argentine footballer who plays for Central Córdoba.
