= Franco Benítez (footballer, born 2002) =

Argentine footballer

Personal information
- Full name: Franco Nahuel Benítez
- Date of birth: 19 March 2002 (age 24)
- Place of birth: José C. Paz, Buenos Aires, Argentina
- Height: 1.65 m (5 ft 5 in)
- Position: Attacking midfielder

Team information
- Current team: Temperley (on loan from Argentinos Juniors)

Youth career
- Argentinos Juniors

Senior career*
Years	Team	Apps	(Gls)
2021–	Argentinos Juniors	0	(0)
2021–2022	→ Brown de Adrogué (loan)	22	(2)
2024	→ Brown de Adrogué (loan)	34	(1)
2025	→ Universidad de Concepción (loan)	14	(0)
2026–	→ Temperley (loan)	8	(0)

International career
- Argentina U15
- Argentina U17
- * Club domestic league appearances and goals as of 17:50, 20 April 2026 (UTC)

Franco Nahuel Benítez (born 19 March 2002) is an Argentine professional footballer who plays as an attacking midfielder for Temperley, on loan from Argentinos Juniors.

== Club career ==
A product of Argentinos Juniors, Benítez was loaned out twice to Brown de Adrogué in 2021–2022 and 2024. In February 2025, Benítez moved to Chile and joined Universidad de Concepción on a one-year loan, winning the 2025 Liga de Ascenso.

== International career ==
Benítez has represented Argentina at under-15 and under-17 level.

== Honours ==
Universidad de Concepción

- Primera B de Chile: 2025
