= Matías Sosa (footballer, born 2001) =

Argentine footballer

Personal information
- Full name: Matías Josiás Sosa
- Date of birth: 18 August 2001 (age 25)
- Place of birth: Burzaco, Argentina
- Position: Striker

Team information
- Current team: Arsenal Sarandí

Youth career
- CSyD Arzeno
- Temperley
- 2016–2017: Victoriano Arenas
- 2017–2020: Temperley

Senior career*
Years	Team	Apps	(Gls)
2020–2022	Temperley	6	(0)
2021	→ Talleres (loan)	5	(0)
2022–2024	Talleres	0	(0)
2022	→ Atenas (loan)	18	(0)
2023	→ Güemes (loan)	14	(0)
2023	→ Temperley (loan)	13	(1)
2024–2026	Defensa y Justicia	7	(1)
2026–	Arsenal Sarandí	3	(1)
- * Club domestic league appearances and goals as of 17:30, 13 March 2026 (UTC)

Matías Josiás Sosa (born 18 August 2001) is an Argentine professional footballer who plays as a striker for Arsenal Sarandí.

== Career ==
Sosa began with hometown team Club Social y Deportivo Arzeno, though would eventually depart to Temperley. He spent one year with Victoriano Arenas in 2016–17. After making his reserve debut back with Temperley in December 2017 against San Martín, the striker was promoted into the first-team in 2020 under Walter Perazzo. He made his senior debut on 30 November during a Primera Nacional home victory over Ferro Carril Oeste, as he replaced Lucas Baldunciel for the final eleven minutes. He appeared off the bench again on 6 December away to Agropecuario, before making his first start on 13 December at home to Estudinates.

On 23 February 2021, after seven matches for Temperley, Sosa was loaned to Primera División side Talleres; until the succeeding December, with a purchase option. Already in July 2021, Talleres decided to trigger the purchase option, meaning that Sosa would join the club permanently from 2022. In February 2022, Sosa was loaned out to Uruguayan Primera División club Atenas until the end of the year with a purchase option.

== Career statistics ==
As of 24 February 2021.

Appearances and goals by club, season and competition
Club	Season	League			Cup		League Cup		Continental		Other		Total	
Club	Season	Division	Apps	Goals	Apps	Goals	Apps	Goals	Apps	Goals	Apps	Goals	Apps	Goals
Temperley	2020	Primera Nacional	6	0	1	0	—		—		0	0	7	0
Temperley	2021	Primera Nacional	0	0	0	0	—		—		0	0	0	0
Temperley	Total		6	0	1	0	—		—		0	0	7	0
Talleres (loan)	2021 (Note: Soccerway counts Copa de la Liga Profesional appearances as league appearances.)	Primera División	0	0	0	0	—		0	0	0	0	0	0
Career total			6	0	1	0	—		0	0	0	0	7	0
