= Ariel Kippes =

Argentine footballer

Personal information
- Full name: Ariel Armando Kippes
- Date of birth: 25 February 1994 (age 32)
- Place of birth: Moreno, Argentina
- Height: 1.83 m (6 ft 0 in)
- Position: Centre-back

Team information
- Current team: Quilmes

Youth career
- Sarmiento

Senior career*
Years	Team	Apps	(Gls)
2016–2020	Sarmiento	32	(0)
2019–2020	→ Brown de Adrogué (loan)	16	(1)
2020–2024	Brown de Adrogué	96	(2)
2024–2026	San Miguel	60	(1)
2026–	Quilmes	8	(0)
- * Club domestic league appearances and goals as of 17:28, 18 April 2026 (UTC)

Ariel Armando Kippes (born 25 February 1994) is an Argentinian footballer who plays for Quilmes in the Primera Nacional.
