= Fernando Enrique (footballer) =

Argentine professional footballer

Personal information
- Full name: Fernando Adolfo Enrique
- Date of birth: 16 September 1985 (age 41)
- Place of birth: Llavallol, Argentina
- Height: 1.71 m (5 ft 7 in)
- Position: Midfielder

Team information
- Current team: Talleres RE

Senior career*
Years	Team	Apps	(Gls)
2006	Almagro	18	(0)
2007	Colo-Colo	0	(0)
2007–2008	Talleres RE	29	(0)
2008	Tristán Suárez	5	(0)
2009–2014	Brown de Adrogué	127	(7)
2012–2013	→ Rosario Central (loan)	0	(0)
2014–2018	Defensores de Belgrano	141	(18)
2018–2019	Atlanta	31	(5)
2019–2020	Brown de Adrogué	20	(0)
2021–	Talleres RE	52	(4)
- * Club domestic league appearances and goals as of 16:05, 23 June 2022 (UTC)

Fernando Adolfo Enrique (born 16 September 1985) is an Argentine professional footballer who plays as a midfielder for Talleres RE.

== Career ==
Enrique appeared for Primera B Nacional's Almagro in 2006, making eighteen appearances. In 2007, Enrique joined Colo-Colo of the Chilean Primera División. He dropped down to Primera B Metropolitana for the 2007–08 campaign, featuring twenty-nine times for Talleres. A short stint with Tristán Suárez in 2008 followed, prior to the midfielder signing for fellow third tier team Brown in 2009. He scored seven goals in his opening three seasons with them, which preceded a loan move to Primera B Nacional side Rosario Central for 2012–13. He appeared just once, as a starter versus Central Córdoba in the Copa Argentina.

Enrique returned to Brown, with the club now playing in tier two after 2012–13 promotion. On 9 July 2014, Enrique completed a move to Defensores de Belgrano of Primera C Metropolitana. Three goals in eighteen matches followed as they were promoted to Primera B Metropolitana. Another promotion came four seasons later in 2017–18, after he had scored fifteen goals in that period. In July 2018, Enrique remained in the same division after agreeing terms with Atlanta. His first goal arrived in his twelfth appearance, netting in a four-goal win away to ex-club Talleres.

== Personal life ==
Enrique is the son of former footballers Héctor Enrique, who won the 1986 FIFA World Cup, and nephew of Carlos Enrique. His brothers, Ramiro (football) and Facundo (rugby), are also sportsmen.

== Career statistics ==
As of 28 April 2019.

Appearances and goals by club, season and competition
Club	Season	League			Cup		League Cup		Continental		Other		Total	
Club	Season	Division	Apps	Goals	Apps	Goals	Apps	Goals	Apps	Goals	Apps	Goals	Apps	Goals
Talleres	2007–08	Primera B Metropolitana	29	0	0	0	—		—		0	0	29	0
Brown	2012–13	Primera B Metropolitana	0	0	0	0	—		—		0	0	0	0
Brown	2013–14	Primera B Nacional	17	0	1	0	—		—		0	0	18	0
Brown	Total		17	0	1	0	—		—		0	0	18	0
Rosario Central (loan)	2012–13	Primera B Nacional	0	0	1	0	—		—		0	0	1	0
Defensores de Belgrano	2014	Primera C Metropolitana	18	3	0	0	—		—		0	0	18	3
Defensores de Belgrano	2015	Primera B Metropolitana	41	5	1	0	—		—		2 (Note: Appearance(s) in the Primera B Metropolitana play-offs)	0	44	5
Defensores de Belgrano	2016	Primera B Metropolitana	16	1	0	0	—		—		0	0	16	1
Defensores de Belgrano	2016–17	Primera B Metropolitana	34	3	3	0	—		—		1	0	38	3
Defensores de Belgrano	2017–18	Primera B Metropolitana	32	6	0	0	—		—		5	0	37	6
Defensores de Belgrano	Total		141	18	4	0	—		—		8	0	153	18
Atlanta	2018–19	Primera B Metropolitana	27	5	0	0	—		—		0	0	27	5
Career total			214	23	6	0	—		—		8	0	228	23
