= Ignacio Liporace =

Argentine footballer

Personal information
- Date of birth: 10 April 1992 (age 34)
- Place of birth: Haedo, Argentina
- Height: 1.83 m (6 ft 0 in)
- Position: Left-back

Team information
- Current team: Europa
- Number: 25

Youth career
- Boca Juniors
- Argentinos Juniors

Senior career*
Years	Team	Apps	(Gls)
2013–2015	San Miguel	84	(1)
2016–2017	Cañuelas	54	(1)
2017–2018	UAI Urquiza	25	(0)
2018–2019	Brown	23	(1)
2019–2020	Atlético de Rafaela	20	(1)
2020–2021	Sambenedettese	26	(0)
2021–2023	Panachaiki	8	(3)
2023	Kalamata	12	(0)
2023–2024	Giouchtas	16	(1)
2024–	Europa	21	(4)
- * Club domestic league appearances and goals as of 4 May 2025

Ignacio Liporace (born 10 April 1992) is an Argentine professional footballer who plays as a left-back for Gibraltar Football League club Europa.

== Career ==
Liporace had youth spells with Boca Juniors and Argentinos Juniors. In 2013, San Miguel became his first senior club, with the defender remaining for two further years and scoring one goal in eighty-four games as the club rose from Primera D Metropolitana to Primera C Metropolitana. After thirty-four matches in the 2015 campaign, Liporace departed San Miguel to join fellow fourth tier outfit Cañuelas. On 23 July 2017, Liporace completed a move to UAI Urquiza of Primera B Metropolitana. Thirty appearances followed. July 2018 saw Liporace join Primera B Nacional's Brown. He made his debut on 1 September in a win over Olimpo.

In September 2020, Liporace headed abroad for the first time as he agreed terms with Italian Serie C side Sambenedettese. His first appearance arrived on 23 September during a Coppa Italia first round defeat to Alessandria.

On 21 October 2021, he signed with Panachaiki in Greece.

== Career statistics ==
As of 18 December 2020.

Club statistics
Club	Season	League			Cup		League Cup		Continental		Other		Total	
Club	Season	Division	Apps	Goals	Apps	Goals	Apps	Goals	Apps	Goals	Apps	Goals	Apps	Goals
San Miguel	2015	Primera C Metropolitana	34	0	0	0	—		—		0	0	34	0
UAI Urquiza	2017–18	Primera B Metropolitana	25	0	0	0	—		—		5 (Note: Appearance(s) in the Primera B Metropolitana play-offs)	0	30	0
Brown	2018–19	Primera B Nacional	23	1	2	0	—		—		0	0	25	1
Atlético de Rafaela	2019–20	Primera B Nacional	20	1	0	0	—		—		0	0	20	1
Sambenedettese	2020–21	Serie C	8	0	1	0	0	0	—		0	0	9	0
Career total			110	2	3	0	0	0	—		5	0	118	2
