= 2016 Primera B Nacional =

31st season of the second-tier football league in Argentina

Primera B Nacional
- Season: 2016
- Champions: Talleres (C) (2nd title)
- Promoted: Talleres (C)
- Relegated: Juventud Unida Universitario
- Matches: 231
- Goals: 530 (2.29 per match)
- Top goalscorer: Germán Lesman (17 goals)
- Biggest home win: Central Córdoba (SdE) 6-0 Atlético Paraná (June 19)
- Biggest away win: Douglas Haig 0-4 Villa Dálmine (June 12)
- Highest scoring: Nueva Chicago 6-4 Villa Dálmine (April 29)
- Longest unbeaten run: 21 matches Talleres (C)
- Longest losing run: 0 matches Talleres (C)
- All statistics correct as of 19 June 2016.

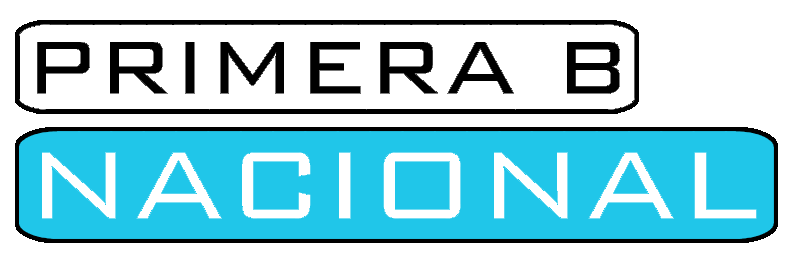

The 2016 Argentine Primera B Nacional was the 31st season of the Argentine second division. The season began in January and ended in July. Twenty-two teams competed in the league, sixteen returning from the 2015 season, two teams that were relegated from Primera División and four teams promoted from Federal A and B Metropolitana.

== Competition format ==
The league's format has changed from last season. In this year there were twenty-two teams who played each other once in one Round-robin tournament. One team would be crowned as champion and automatically promoted to the Primera División. One team would be relegated at the end of the season.

== Club information ==
Locations of the 2016 season teams.
Locations of the 2016–17 Primera B Nacional teams within Greater Buenos Aires.

| Club | City | Stadium |
|---|---|---|
| All Boys | Buenos Aires | Islas Malvinas |
| Almagro | José Ingenieros | Tres de Febrero |
| Atlético Paraná | Paraná | Pedro Mutio |
| Boca Unidos | Corrientes | Leoncio Benítez |
| Brown | Adrogué | Lorenzo Arandilla |
| Central Córdoba | Santiago del Estero | Alfredo Terrera |
| Chacarita Juniors | Villa Maipú | Chacarita Juniors Stadium |
| Crucero del Norte | Garupá | Comandante Andrés Guacurarí |
| Douglas Haig | Pergamino | Miguel Morales |
| Estudiantes | San Luis | Héctor Odicino-Pedro Benoza |
| Ferro Carril Oeste | Buenos Aires | Arquitecto Ricardo Etcheverry |
| Gimnasia y Esgrima | Jujuy | 23 de Agosto |
| Guillermo Brown | Puerto Madryn | Raúl Conti |
| Independiente Rivadavia | Mendoza | Bautista Gargantini |
| Instituto | Córdoba | Presidente Perón |
| Juventud Unida | Gualeguaychú | Estadio Luis Delfino |
| Juventud Unida Universitario | San Luis | Mario Diez |
| Los Andes | Lomas de Zamora | Estadio Eduardo Gallardón |
| Nueva Chicago | Mataderos | Nueva Chicago |
| Santamarina | Tandil | Municipal Gral. San Martín |
| Talleres | Córdoba | Mario Alberto Kempes |
| Villa Dálmine | Campana | Villa Dálmine |

== League table ==
| Pos | Team | Pld | W | D | L | GF | GA | GD | Pts | Promotion or Qualification |
|---|---|---|---|---|---|---|---|---|---|---|
| 1 | Talleres (C) (C, P) | 21 | 14 | 7 | 0 | 31 | 11 | +20 | 49 | Promotion to Primera División |
| 2 | Chacarita Juniors | 21 | 13 | 4 | 4 | 30 | 12 | +18 | 43 | |
| 3 | Gimnasia y Esgrima (J) | 21 | 11 | 5 | 5 | 26 | 16 | +10 | 38 | |
| 4 | Boca Unidos | 21 | 11 | 5 | 5 | 28 | 19 | +9 | 38 | |
| 5 | Villa Dálmine | 21 | 9 | 6 | 6 | 35 | 28 | +7 | 33 | |
| 6 | Crucero del Norte | 21 | 9 | 5 | 7 | 26 | 25 | +1 | 32 | |
| 7 | Nueva Chicago | 21 | 9 | 3 | 9 | 32 | 27 | +5 | 30 | |
| 8 | Guillermo Brown | 21 | 9 | 3 | 9 | 31 | 29 | +2 | 30 | |
| 9 | Los Andes | 21 | 8 | 6 | 7 | 21 | 22 | −1 | 30 | |
| 10 | Brown | 21 | 6 | 10 | 5 | 27 | 26 | +1 | 28 | |
| 11 | Juventud Unida (G) | 21 | 7 | 7 | 7 | 25 | 26 | −1 | 28 | |
| 12 | Almagro | 21 | 7 | 7 | 7 | 23 | 25 | −2 | 28 | |
| 13 | Santamarina | 21 | 7 | 6 | 8 | 16 | 19 | −3 | 27 | |
| 14 | All Boys | 21 | 7 | 5 | 9 | 30 | 28 | +2 | 26 | |
| 15 | Ferro Carril Oeste | 21 | 7 | 5 | 9 | 21 | 27 | −6 | 26 | |
| 16 | Estudiantes (SL) | 21 | 7 | 3 | 11 | 17 | 25 | −8 | 24 | |
| 17 | Juventud Unida Universitario | 21 | 4 | 10 | 7 | 20 | 23 | −3 | 22 | |
| 18 | Central Córdoba (SdE) | 21 | 5 | 6 | 10 | 23 | 27 | −4 | 21 | |
| 19 | Douglas Haig | 21 | 5 | 5 | 11 | 20 | 24 | −4 | 20 | |
| 20 | Independiente Rivadavia | 21 | 4 | 8 | 9 | 14 | 26 | −12 | 20 | |
| 21 | Atlético Paraná | 21 | 3 | 10 | 8 | 16 | 32 | −16 | 19 | |
| 22 | Instituto | 21 | 4 | 4 | 13 | 18 | 33 | −15 | 16 | |

Source: AFA
Rules for classification: 1) points; 2) play-off (only for deciding promotion or relegation); 3) goal difference; 4) goals scored; 5) head-to-head points; 6) head-to-head goal difference; 7) head-to-head goals scored.
(C) Champions; (P) Promoted

== Results ==
| Home \ Away | ALL | ALM | APA | BOU | BRO | CCO | CHA | CRU | DOU | ESL | FCO | GEJ | GBR | IND | INS | JUG | JUU | LAN | NCH | SAN | TAL | VDA |
|---|---|---|---|---|---|---|---|---|---|---|---|---|---|---|---|---|---|---|---|---|---|---|
| All Boys | | | | 3–0 | | | 1–0 | | 1–0 | | 1–1 | 0–1 | | 1–2 | | 1–2 | 1–1 | 1–2 | 5–2 | | 1–2 | |
| Almagro | 0–2 | | 2–0 | 3–1 | | | 1–2 | | | 0–0 | 1–3 | | | | | 2–2 | 1–0 | 1–2 | 0–2 | 1–1 | | |
| Atlético Paraná | 2–2 | | | 0–2 | | | 1–3 | | | 1–2 | 1–1 | 0–0 | | | | 1–1 | 2–1 | 1–1 | 1–1 | 1–1 | | |
| Boca Unidos | | | | | 2–0 | 1–0 | 1–0 | 2–2 | | | 2–0 | | 1–2 | | 3–0 | 0–0 | 0–0 | | 2–1 | | | 3–1 |
| Brown | 0–2 | 2–3 | 1–1 | | | 0–0 | | 4–3 | | 1–0 | | | 2–2 | | 4–0 | | | | | 2–2 | | 1–1 |
| Central Cba. (SdE) | 2–3 | 2–0 | 6–0 | | | | 1–1 | 0–1 | | 1–3 | | | | | 2–3 | 3–3 | 0–0 | | | 1–0 | | |
| Chacarita | | | | | 2–0 | | | | 1–0 | | 2–0 | 1–0 | | 4–0 | | 1–0 | 1–1 | 3–0 | 0–1 | | 1–1 | |
| Crucero del Norte | 3–2 | 1–1 | 0–0 | | | | 1–1 | | | 3–0 | 0–0 | | | | | 1–0 | 2–1 | | 1–0 | 3–0 | | |
| Douglas Haig | | 0–1 | 2–0 | 1–3 | 0–0 | 2–0 | | 3–0 | | | | | 1–2 | 4–0 | 2–0 | | | | | | 0–1 | 0–4 |
| Estudiantes | 1–1 | | | 0–1 | | | 0–1 | | 2–1 | | 0–1 | 0–1 | | | | 2–1 | 2–1 | 0–0 | 1–0 | 2–0 | | |
| Ferro Carril Oeste | | | | | 2–2 | 1–0 | | | 2–1 | | | 0–2 | 3–1 | 2–1 | | | | 0–2 | 0–2 | | 1–2 | 1–3 |
| Gimnasia y Esgrima (J) | | 1–1 | | 4–3 | 1–0 | 2–0 | | 2–0 | 2–0 | | | | 4–2 | 1–0 | 0–0 | | | | | | 1–2 | 1–1 |
| Guillermo Brown | 1–0 | 0–1 | 1–2 | | | 1–1 | 3–0 | 2–1 | | 2–0 | | | | | 1–0 | | | | | 1–1 | | 3–1 |
| Independiente Rivadavia | | 1–2 | 0–0 | 0–0 | 1–1 | 0–1 | | 2–0 | | 2–1 | | | 2–1 | | 0–3 | | | | | | 0–0 | 0–0 |
| Instituto | 4–1 | 2–2 | 0–1 | | | | 0–3 | 1–2 | | 2–0 | 0–2 | | | | | 0–1 | 0–2 | | | 0–1 | | |
| Juventud Unida (G) | | | | | 2–3 | | | | 1–1 | | 1–1 | 2–1 | 2–1 | 0–0 | | | 1–0 | 1–3 | 2–1 | | 1–1 | |
| Juv. Unida Univ. | | | | | 1–1 | | | | 1–1 | | 0–0 | 1–1 | 3–1 | 1–1 | | | | 3–1 | 2–1 | | 0–3 | 1–3 |
| Los Andes | | | | 0–0 | 0–1 | 0–1 | | 0–1 | 1–1 | | | 1–0 | 1–3 | 1–0 | 0–0 | | | | | | 1–2 | 3–3 |
| Nueva Chicago | | | | | 1–2 | 3–1 | | | 2–0 | | | 0–1 | 1–0 | 2–2 | 3–1 | | | 0–1 | | | 1–1 | 6–4 |
| Santamarina | 2–1 | | | 0–1 | | | 0–2 | | 0–0 | | 2–0 | 2–0 | | 1–0 | | 1–0 | 0–0 | 0–1 | 0–2 | | | |
| Talleres (C) | | 0–0 | 3–0 | 2–0 | 0–0 | 2–0 | | 2–1 | | 1–0 | | | 2–1 | | 1–1 | | | | | 1–0 | | 2–1 |
| Villa Dálmine | 0–0 | 1–0 | 2–1 | | | 1–1 | 0–1 | 1–0 | | 4–1 | | | | | 2–1 | 2–1 | | | | 0–1 | | |

Updated to match(es) played on 19 June 2016. Source: AFA
Legend: Blue = home team win; Yellow = draw; Red = away team win.

== Relegation ==
The bottom team of this table face relegation. Clubs with an indirect affiliation with Argentine Football Association are relegated to the Torneo Federal A, while clubs directly affiliated face relegation to Primera B Metropolitana.

| Pos | Team | 2013–14 Pts | 2014 Pts | 2015 Pts | 2016 Pts | Total Pts | Total Pld | Avg | Relegation |
|---|---|---|---|---|---|---|---|---|---|
| 1 | Talleres (C) | – | – | – | 49 | 49 | 21 | 2.333 | |
| 2 | Crucero del Norte | 59 | 33 | – | 32 | 124 | 83 | 1.494 | |
| 3 | Chacarita Juniors | – | – | 50 | 43 | 93 | 63 | 1.476 | |
| 4 | Villa Dálmine | – | – | 60 | 33 | 93 | 63 | 1.476 | |
| 5 | Gimnasia y Esgrima (J) | 61 | 30 | 55 | 38 | 184 | 125 | 1.472 | |
| 6 | Nueva Chicago | – | 30 | – | 30 | 60 | 41 | 1.463 | |
| 7 | Santamarina | – | 24 | 66 | 27 | 117 | 83 | 1.41 | |
| 8 | Boca Unidos | 54 | 27 | 54 | 38 | 173 | 125 | 1.384 | |
| 9 | Los Andes | – | – | 54 | 30 | 84 | 63 | 1.333 | |
| 10 | Brown | – | – | – | 28 | 28 | 21 | 1.333 | |
| 11 | Almagro | – | – | – | 28 | 28 | 21 | 1.333 | |
| 12 | Instituto | 62 | 25 | 62 | 16 | 165 | 125 | 1.32 | |
| 13 | Ferro Carril Oeste | 55 | 16 | 67 | 26 | 164 | 125 | 1.312 | |
| 14 | Juventud Unida (G) | – | – | 54 | 28 | 82 | 63 | 1.302 | |
| 15 | Estudiantes (SL) | – | – | 56 | 24 | 80 | 63 | 1.27 | |
| 16 | Guillermo Brown | – | – | 48 | 30 | 78 | 63 | 1.238 | |
| 17 | Douglas Haig | 51 | 25 | 58 | 20 | 154 | 125 | 1.232 | |
| 18 | Atlético Paraná | – | – | 58 | 19 | 77 | 63 | 1.222 | |
| 19 | All Boys | – | 22 | 53 | 26 | 101 | 83 | 1.217 | |
| 20 | Independiente Rivadavia | 55 | 22 | 51 | 20 | 148 | 125 | 1.184 | |
| 21 | Central Córdoba (SdE) | – | – | 51 | 21 | 72 | 63 | 1.143 | |
| 22 | Juventud Unida Universitario (R) | – | – | – | 22 | 22 | 21 | 1.048 | Torneo Federal A |

Source: AFA

As of 19 June 2016

== Season statistics ==
=== Top scorers ===
As of June 14, 2016

| Rank | Player | Club | Goals |
|---|---|---|---|
| 1 | (Argentina) Germán Lessman | All Boys | 17 |
| 2 | (Argentina) Fabricio Lenci | Juventud Unida (G) | 13 |
| 3 | (Argentina) Fernando Coniglio | Chacarita Juniors | 11 |
| 4 | (Argentina) Cristian Chávez | Brown | 9 |
| 5 | (Argentina) Nicolás Giménez | Nueva Chicago | 8 |
| 5 | (Argentina) Oscar Altamirano | Almagro | 8 |
| 5 | (Argentina) Matías Linas | Los Andes | 8 |
| 5 | (Argentina) Franco Cángele | Boca Unidos | 8 |

== See also ==
- 2016 Argentine Primera División
- 2016 Torneo Federal A
- 2015–16 Copa Argentina
