= Club Atlético Brown =

Brown (Adrogué)
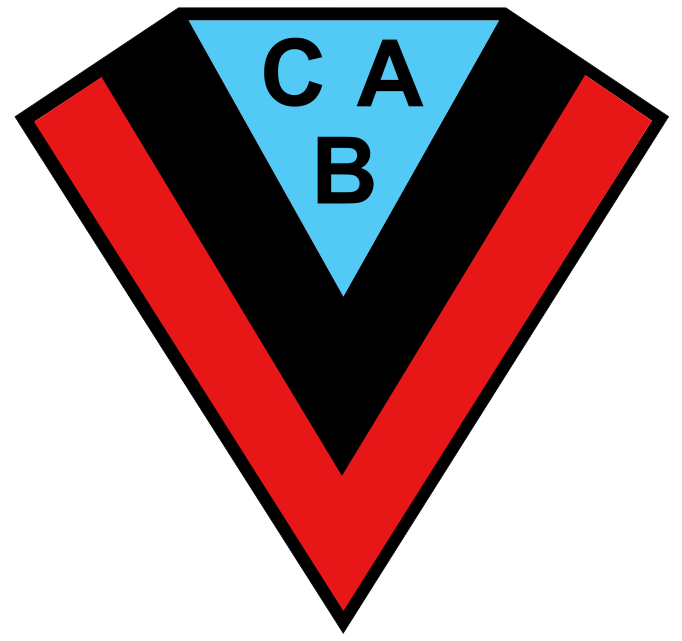
- Full name: Club Atlético Brown
- Nickname: Tricolor
- Founded: 3 March 1945; 81 years ago
- Ground: Estadio Lorenzo Arandilla Adrogué, Greater Buenos Aires, Argentina
- Capacity: 4,500
- Chairman: Adrián Vairo
- Manager: Pablo Nieva
- League: Primera Nacional
- 2023: Primera Nacional Zone B, 9th
- Website: https://cabrown.com.ar/
Home colours	Away colours	Third colours

Club Atlético Brown (mostly known as Brown de Adrogué) is an Argentine football club from the Adrogué neighborhood in Greater Buenos Aires. The team currently plays in Primera B Nacional, the second division of the Argentine football league system.

== History ==
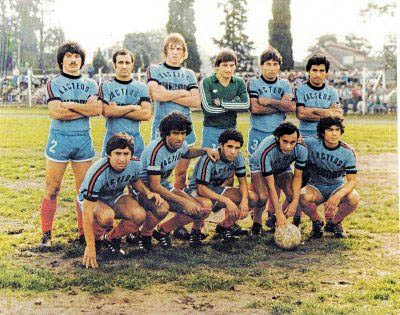
The team that won the Primera D title in 1980

The club was formed in 1945 as a multidisciplinary sports club. Brown, which has never played in Primera División, reached its highest league position in the 1999–00 season, finishing in 1st place in Primera B Metropolitana tournament, but could not promote to Primera B Nacional, being defeated in the play-off semi-final.

In June 2013, Brown won the play-off series defeating Almagro at the finals by penalty shoot-out. Therefore the squad promoted to the upper division, Primera B Nacional, for the first time in the history of the club.

Brown de Adrogué won its second title in 2015, the Primera B Metropolitana championship, therefore the squad promoted to the second division, Primera B Nacional. In September 2018, Brown achieved its most important victory to date, when the squad eliminated Independiente from the Copa Argentina after beating them by penalty shoot-out.

== Players ==
=== Current squad ===
As of 25 June 2024

Note: Flags indicate national team as defined under FIFA eligibility rules; some limited exceptions apply. Players may hold more than one non-FIFA nationality.

No.	Pos.	Nation	Player
—	GK	ARG	Gonzalo Rehak (on loan from Deportivo Maipú)
—	GK	ARG	Matías Wysocki
—	DF	ARG	Carlos Aguirre
—	DF	ARG	Nicolás Arrechea
—	DF	ARG	Jonatan Bogado
—	DF	ARG	Gonzalo Gamarra
—	DF	ARG	Máximo Heredia (on loan from Lanús)
—	DF	ARG	Abel Masuero
—	DF	ARG	Agustín Palomeque
—	DF	CHI	Patricio Romero
—	MF	ARG	Gonzalo Desio
—	MF	ARG	Agustín González

No.	Pos.	Nation	Player
—	MF	ARG	Lautaro Lovazzano
—	MF	ARG	Nahuel Pereyra
—	MF	ARG	Rafael Sangiovani
—	MF	ARG	Tomás Sives (on loan from Lanús)
—	FW	ARG	Franco Benítez (on loan from Argentinos Juniors)
—	FW	ARG	Leonel Buter
—	FW	ARG	Lucio Castillo
—	FW	ARG	Brandon López
—	FW	ARG	Francisco Nouet
—	FW	ARG	Matías Nouet
—	FW	ARG	Matías Sproat
—	FW	ARG	Gabriel Tellas

=== Out on loan ===
Note: Flags indicate national team as defined under FIFA eligibility rules; some limited exceptions apply. Players may hold more than one non-FIFA nationality.

No.	Pos.	Nation	Player
—	DF	ARG	Ayrton Sánchez (at Quilmes until 31 December 2024)
—	MF	ARG	Alexis Castaño (at Dock Sud until 31 December 2024)
—	MF	ARG	Brandon Obregón (at Chaco For Ever until 31 December 2024)

No.	Pos.	Nation	Player
—	FW	ARG	Agustín Campana (at Talleres (RE) until 31 December 2024)
—	FW	ARG	Juan Mendoza (at Almagro until 31 December 2024)

== Honours ==
=== National ===
- Primera B Metropolitana
  - Winners (1): 2015
- Primera División D
  - Winners (1): 1980
