= 2019–20 Chacarita Juniors season =

Chacarita Juniors
2019–20 season
- President: Horacio Fernández
- Manager: Patricio Pisano (until 31 August 2019); Luis Marabotto (int.) (from 2 September 2019)
- Stadium: Estadio Chacarita Juniors
- Top goalscorer: League: Brian Mieres (1); All: Brian Mieres (1)

The 2019–20 season is Chacarita Juniors' 2nd consecutive season in the second division of Argentine football, Primera B Nacional.

The season generally covers the period from 1 July 2019 to 30 June 2020.

== Review ==
=== Pre-season ===
Academy prospect Franco Romero was sold to San Lorenzo on 23 May. Juan Cruz Mascia agreed to join on 10 June 2019, signing from Indian Super League side NorthEast United. Matías Nizzo extended his loan with Deportivo Morón on 14 June. Zacarías Morán and Ignacio Cacheiro joined on 18/24 June. They played their opening friendly on 26 June, though failed to find victory across two fixtures versus Futbolistas Argentinos Agremiados; a team of free agents - Luciano Perdomo featured as a trialist for Chacarita. He signed hours later. The club went three games winless in pre-season on 29 June, as Banfield beat them 2–1 in the first of two matches; though Mascia did notch his first goal. Chacarita later won 2–1 after Lucas Lezcano and Maximiliano Paredes goals.

Loans from 2018 to 2019 officially expired on and around 30 June. Two more new players was announced on 1 July, with Brian Mieres and Adrián Torres coming from Primera B Nacional duo Mitre and Almagro. Rodrigo Ayala, who had been released on 21 June, headed off to Independiente Rivadavia on 2 July, which preceded defender Franco Racca switching Chacarita for Atlético de Rafaela on 3 July. Facundo Melivilo returned to Central Córdoba on loan on 3 July. Left winger Ignacio Bailone and goalkeeper Sebastián Cuerdo signed on 3 July, which preceded Salvador Sánchez (Olimpo) becoming Chacarita's ninth acquisition. Nicolás Álvarez joined Defensores de Belgrano on 5 July. Chacarita held top-flight Defensa y Justicia to pre-season draws on 6 July.

Chacarita made it just one win from eight exhibition matches on 13 July, after failing to defeat Almagro in Moreno. Nehuen Montoya and Maximiliano Paredes' loans to Tristán Suárez and Atlético de Rafaela were confirmed on 16 July. Also on that day, Nicolás Vidal went to General Lamadrid after terminating his contract. Their streak of no pre-season win was extended to six on 17 July, as they drew 2–2 and lost 1–2 to Tristán Suárez. Leonardo Baima switched to Nueva Chicago on 19 July. 20 July saw Chacarita gain their second and third pre-season wins after defeating Comunicaciones across two encounters. A third goalless tie of pre-season came on 24 July versus Justo José de Urquiza, though a 3–2 win followed. An Estudiantes (BA) game was cancelled on 26 July.

Hernán Da Campo was loaned from Rosario Central on 29 July. On 31 July, Chacarita hosted an exhibition encounter with Almirante Brown - as a 1–1 draw was followed by a 4–1 win. 2 August saw Matías García arrive from Unión Santa Fe. Guillermo Brown were Chacarita's ninth opponent of pre-season on 3 August, with the two Primera B Nacional clubs sharing victories at the Estadio Chacarita Juniors. They then played against Fénix in a friendly on 7 August, as they secured a draw and a victory over the Pilar team. Centre-back Germán Ré departed to Villa San Carlos on 9 August. A friendly, set for 10 August, with Quilmes was cancelled due to bad weather.

=== August ===
Chacarita opened their competitive campaign in Primera B Nacional with a goalless draw with All Boys on 15 August, in a fixture that was played behind closed doors due to the threat of fan violence; after pre-match skirmishes in local bars where gunfire was heard. A 2–1 loss at the hands of Gimnasia y Esgrima (J) on 24 August made it no win in two league games for Chacarita. Chacarita had friendlies with Sacachispas on 26 August, as Elías Alderete scored in both a 1–1 draw and, twice, in a 3–1 victory. On 31 August, Chacarita lost by three goals at home to Santamarina. Patricio Pisano resigned as manager shortly after.

=== September ===
Luis Marabotto was appointed as interim manager on 2 September.

== Squad ==
Squad No.	Nationality	Name	Position(s)	Date of birth (age)	Signed from
Goalkeepers
	Argentina	Lucas Bruera	GK	19 October 1997 (age 29)	Independiente
	Argentina	Sebastián Cuerdo	GK	16 July 1986 (age 40)	Estudiantes (SL)
	Argentina	Matías Montero	GK	15 January 1997 (age 29)	Academy
	Argentina	Emanuel Trípodi	GK	8 January 1981 (age 45)	Agropecuario
Defenders
	Argentina	Gian Croci	CB	4 January 1998 (age 28)	Academy
	Argentina	Juan Cruz González	RB	2 December 1996 (age 29)	Academy
	Argentina	Joaquín Ibáñez	LB	18 July 1995 (age 31)	Academy
	Argentina	Gabriel Lazarte	LB	7 November 1997 (age 29)	Academy
	Argentina	Alan Ledesma	CB	15 May 1998 (age 28)	Academy
	Argentina	Brian Mieres	RB	28 July 1995 (age 31)	Mitre
	Argentina	Lautaro Montoya	LB	7 October 1994 (age 32)	San Lorenzo (loan)
	Argentina	Alan Robledo	CB	17 February 1998 (age 28)	Academy
	Argentina	Salvador Sánchez	CB	31 May 1995 (age 31)	Olimpo
	Argentina	Gonzalo Soto	CB	3 April 1990 (age 36)	Técnico Universitario
	Argentina	Facundo Tallarico	CB	21 October 1999 (age 27)	Academy
	Argentina	Adrián Torres	DF	31 October 1989 (age 37)	Almagro
	Argentina	Nahuel Tribulo	RB	25 June 1997 (age 29)	Academy
	Paraguay	Juan Vera	CB	5 February 1999 (age 27)	Academy
Midfielders
	Argentina	Juan Álvarez	LM	27 October 1997 (age 29)	Academy
	Argentina	Tomás Cardozo	MF	23 September 1999 (age 27)	Academy
	Argentina	Nicolás Chávez	MF	1 July 2001 (age 25)	Academy
	Argentina	Hernán Da Campo	RM	6 August 1994 (age 32)	Rosario Central (loan)
	Argentina	Matías García	MF	11 November 1995 (age 31)	Unión Santa Fe
	Argentina	Yair González	MF	21 March 2002 (age 24)	Academy
	Argentina	Gonzalo Groba	AM	16 February 1996 (age 30)	Academy
	Argentina	Enzo Hoyos	MF	10 May 2000 (age 26)	Academy
	Argentina	Brian Inveraldi	MF	2 December 1998 (age 27)	Academy
	Argentina	Agustín Módula	CM	12 March 1993 (age 33)	Academy
	Argentina	Zacarías Morán	CM	22 February 1996 (age 30)	River Plate (loan)
	Argentina	Luciano Perdomo	CM	10 September 1996 (age 30)	Aldosivi
	Argentina	Agustín Piñeyro	CM	26 January 1999 (age 27)	Academy
	Argentina	Diego Rivero	RM	11 August 1981 (age 45)	Argentinos Juniors
	Argentina	Matías Sánchez	AM	5 July 1996 (age 30)	Academy
	Argentina	Federico Vismara	CM	9 May 1983 (age 43)	Racing Club
Forwards
	Argentina	Elías Alderete	LW	30 July 1995 (age 31)	Academy
	Argentina	Ignacio Bailone	LW	19 June 1997 (age 29)	Estudiantes (LP)
	Argentina	Ignacio Cacheiro	RW	12 March 1993 (age 33)	Patronato
	Argentina	Lucas Cano	CF	9 May 1995 (age 31)	Deportes La Serena
	Argentina	Maximiliano Casa	RW	18 February 1993 (age 33)	San Jorge
	Argentina	Lucas Lezcano	CF	9 July 1999 (age 27)	Academy
	Argentina	Ariel López	FW	1 July 2000 (age 26)	Academy
	Uruguay	Juan Cruz Mascia	CF	3 January 1994 (age 32)	NorthEast United
	Argentina	Tomás Segovia	FW	8 February 1999 (age 27)	Academy
Out on loan					Loaned to
	Argentina	Facundo Melivilo	LW	12 August 1992 (age 34)	Central Córdoba
	Argentina	Nehuen Montoya	RB	11 February 1998 (age 28)	Tristán Suárez
	Argentina	Matías Nizzo	CM	2 February 1989 (age 37)	Deportivo Morón
	Argentina	Maximiliano Paredes	RB	26 March 1991 (age 35)	Atlético de Rafaela
	Argentina	Franco Racca	DF	15 January 1992 (age 34)	Atlético de Rafaela

== Transfers ==
Domestic transfer windows:
3 July 2019 to 24 September 2019
20 January 2020 to 19 February 2020.

=== Transfers in ===
Date from	Position	Nationality	Name	From	Ref.
3 July 2019 (Note: Deal agreed on 10 June 2019)	CF	Uruguay	Juan Cruz Mascia	NorthEast United	
3 July 2019 (Note: Deal agreed on 24 June 2019)	RW	Argentina	Ignacio Cacheiro	Patronato	
3 July 2019 (Note: Deal agreed on 26 June 2019)	CM	Argentina	Luciano Perdomo	Aldosivi	
3 July 2019 (Note: Deal agreed on 1 July 2019)	RB	Argentina	Brian Mieres	Mitre	
3 July 2019 (Note: Deal agreed on 1 July 2019)	DF	Argentina	Adrián Torres	Almagro	
3 July 2019 (Note: Deal agreed on 3 July 2019)	LW	Argentina	Ignacio Bailone	Estudiantes (LP)	
3 July 2019 (Note: Deal agreed on 3 July 2019)	GK	Argentina	Sebastián Cuerdo	Estudiantes (SL)	
4 July 2019	CB	Argentina	Salvador Sánchez	Olimpo	
2 August 2019	MF	Argentina	Matías García	Unión Santa Fe	

=== Transfers out ===
Date from	Position	Nationality	Name	To	Ref.
3 July 2019 (Note: Deal agreed on 23 May 2019)	FW	Argentina	Franco Romero	San Lorenzo	
3 July 2019 (Note: Deal agreed on 2 July 2019)	LB	Argentina	Rodrigo Ayala	Independiente Rivadavia (Note: Released by Chacarita Juniors on 21 June.)	
5 July 2019	RB	Argentina	Nicolás Álvarez	Defensores de Belgrano	
16 July 2019	RM	Argentina	Nicolás Vidal	General Lamadrid (Note: Released by Chacarita Juniors on 16 July.)	
19 July 2019	LM	Argentina	Leonardo Baima	Nueva Chicago	
9 August 2019	CB	Argentina	Germán Ré	Villa San Carlos	

=== Loans in ===
Start date	Position	Nationality	Name	From	End date	Ref.
3 July 2019 (Note: Deal agreed on 18 June 2019)	CM	Argentina	Zacarías Morán	River Plate	30 June 2020	
29 July 2019	RM	Argentina	Hernán Da Campo	Rosario Central	30 June 2020	

=== Loans out ===
Start date	Position	Nationality	Name	To	End date	Ref.
3 July 2019	LW	Argentina	Facundo Melivilo	Central Córdoba	30 June 2020	
3 July 2019	DF	Argentina	Franco Racca	Atlético de Rafaela	30 June 2020	
16 July 2019	RB	Argentina	Maximiliano Paredes	Atlético de Rafaela	30 June 2020	
16 July 2019	RB	Argentina	Nehuen Montoya	Tristán Suárez	30 June 2020	
25 January 2020	FW	Argentina	Elías Alderete	Arema FC	31 December 2020	

== Friendlies ==
=== Pre-season ===
Chacarita Juniors announced their initial pre-season schedule on 20 June 2019. They'd visit Primera División duo Banfield (2) and Defensa y Justicia on 29 June and 6 July, before meeting Almagro, Tristán Suárez, Comunicaciones, Justo José de Urquiza and Estudiantes across the rest of July. The venue for the latter five fixtures was revealed on 23 June, as were the place for the Banfield encounters. On that day, matches with Futbolistas Argentinos Agremiados, a team made up of free agents, were set for 26 June. They'd face Almirante Brown in late July, prior to meeting Guillermo Brown, Fénix and Quilmes in early August.

Win Draw Loss

26 June 2019 Friendly	Futbolistas Argentinos Agremiados	0–0	Chacarita Juniors	Buenos Aires, Argentina
		Chacarita Juniors; Mundo Ascenso		Stadium: Estadio G.E.B.A.

26 June 2019 Friendly	Futbolistas Argentinos Agremiados	3–2	Chacarita Juniors	Buenos Aires, Argentina
	Goal	Chacarita Juniors; Mundo Ascenso	E. Alderete; J. Álvarez	Stadium: Estadio G.E.B.A.

29 June 2019 Friendly	Banfield	2–1	Chacarita Juniors	Luis Guillón, Argentina
09:39 GMT-3	A. Fontana	Chacarita Juniors; TyC Sports; 80 min. match	J. Mascia	Stadium: Campo de Deportes Alfredo Palacios

29 June 2019 Friendly	Banfield	1–2	Chacarita Juniors	Luis Guillón, Argentina
	F. Tallarico (o.g.)	Chacarita Juniors; TyC Sports; 80 min. match	L. Lezcano; M. Paredes	Stadium: Campo de Deportes Alfredo Palacios

6 July 2019 Friendly	Defensa y Justicia	0–0	Chacarita Juniors	Florencio Varela, Argentina
09:40 GMT-3		Chacarita Juniors; Mundo Ascenso; 80 min. match		Stadium: Predio Áreas Grandes

6 July 2019 Friendly	Defensa y Justicia	1–1	Chacarita Juniors	Florencio Varela, Argentina
11:22 GMT-3	H. Martínez	Chacarita Juniors; Mundo Ascenso; 80 min. match	Y. González	Stadium: Predio Áreas Grandes

13 July 2019 Friendly	Chacarita Juniors	0–1	Almagro	Moreno, Argentina
09:35 GMT-3		Chacarita Juniors; Grupo La Provincia; 80 min. match	G. Herrera	Stadium: UTA Argentina; Attendance: 0 (Note: Behind closed doors.)

13 July 2019 Friendly	Chacarita Juniors	1–1	Almagro	Moreno, Argentina
11:15 GMT-3	G. Groba	Chacarita Juniors; Grupo La Provincia; 80 min. match	E. Denis	Stadium: UTA Argentina; Attendance: 0 (Note: Behind closed doors.)

17 July 2019 Friendly	Chacarita Juniors	2–2	Tristán Suárez	Moreno, Argentina
09:40 GMT-3	L. Lezcano 35'; A. Robledo 39'	Chacarita Juniors; Gambeteando; 60 min. match	Goal	Stadium: UTA Argentina

17 July 2019 Friendly	Chacarita Juniors	1–2	Tristán Suárez	Moreno, Argentina
10:57 GMT-3	I. Bailone 56'	Chacarita Juniors; Gambeteando; 60 min. match	F. Garay	Stadium: UTA Argentina

20 July 2019 Friendly	Chacarita Juniors	1–0	Comunicaciones	Moreno, Argentina
09:31 GMT-3	L. Cano 9'	Chacarita Juniors; Grupo La Provincia; 80 min. match		Stadium: UTA Argentina

20 July 2019 Friendly	Chacarita Juniors	3–0	Comunicaciones	Moreno, Argentina
11:06 GMT-3	L. Lezcano 18'; J. Ibáñez 67'; I. Cacheiro 70'	Chacarita Juniors; Grupo La Provincia; 80 min. match		Stadium: UTA Argentina

24 July 2019 Friendly	Chacarita Juniors	0–0	Justo José de Urquiza	Moreno, Argentina
09:31 GMT-3		Chacarita Juniors; Grupo La Provincia; 60 min. match		Stadium: UTA Argentina

24 July 2019 Friendly	Chacarita Juniors	3–2	Justo José de Urquiza	Moreno, Argentina
11:06 GMT-3	S. Sánchez; L. Lezcano; E. Alderete	Chacarita Juniors; Grupo La Provincia; 60 min. match	M. Mena; A. Sombra	Stadium: UTA Argentina

27 July 2019 Friendly	Chacarita Juniors	Cancelled	Estudiantes (BA)	Moreno, Argentina
				Stadium: UTA Argentina

31 July 2019 Friendly	Chacarita Juniors	1–1	Almirante Brown	Moreno, Argentina
09:31 GMT-3	G. Lazarte 60'	Chacarita Juniors; Diario Democracia; 60 min. match	M. Denis 19'	Stadium: UTA Argentina

31 July 2019 Friendly	Chacarita Juniors	4–1	Almirante Brown	Moreno, Argentina
10:48 GMT-3	A. Robledo 17'; M. Grande 23' (o.g.); L. Cano 29', 51'	Chacarita Juniors; Diario Democracia; 60 min. match	O. Pires	Stadium: UTA Argentina

3 August 2019 Friendly	Chacarita Juniors	2–3	Guillermo Brown	Buenos Aires, Argentina
09:39 GMT-3	M. Casa 39'; L. Cano 43' (pen.)	Chacarita Juniors; Diario Jornada	J. Martínez 3'; E. Moreno 31'; A. Méndez 66'	Stadium: Estadio Chacarita Juniors

3 August 2019 Friendly	Chacarita Juniors	2–1	Guillermo Brown	Buenos Aires, Argentina
	E. Alderete 65', 76'	Chacarita Juniors; Diario Jornada	E. Tourville 89'	Stadium: Estadio Chacarita Juniors

7 August 2019 Friendly	Chacarita Juniors	1–1	Fénix	Moreno, Argentina
09:39 GMT-3	H. Da Campo 47'	Chacarita Juniors; Grupo La Provincia; 60 min. match	F. Pansardi 2'	Stadium: UTA Argentina

7 August 2019 Friendly	Chacarita Juniors	3–2	Fénix	Moreno, Argentina
10:48 GMT-3	L. Lezcano 58', 59'; E. Alderete 65'	Chacarita Juniors; Grupo La Provincia; 80 min. match	A. Gallo; E. Bonfigli	Stadium: UTA Argentina

10 August 2019 Friendly	Chacarita Juniors	Cancelled	Quilmes	Argentina
		Perspectiva Sur

=== Mid-season ===
Chacarita faced Sacachispas of Primera B Metropolitana in a mid-season match on 26 August.

Win Draw Loss

26 August 2019 Friendly	Chacarita Juniors	1–1	Sacachispas	Moreno, Argentina
	E. Alderete	Chacarita Juniors; Mundo Ascenso; 60 min. match	Goal	Stadium: UTA Argentina

26 August 2019 Friendly	Chacarita Juniors	3–1	Sacachispas	Moreno, Argentina
	E. Alderete; J. Ibáñez	Chacarita Juniors; Mundo Ascenso; 60 min. match	Goal	Stadium: UTA Argentina

== Competitions ==
=== Primera B Nacional ===
==== Results summary ====
Overall								Home						Away					
Pld	W	D	L	GF	GA	GD	Pts	W	D	L	GF	GA	GD	W	D	L	GF	GA	GD
3	0	1	2	1	5	−4	1	0	1	1	0	3	−3	0	0	1	1	2	−1

Last updated: 3 September 2019.
Source: Soccerway

==== Matches ====
The fixtures for the 2019–20 league season were announced on 1 August 2019, with a new format of split zones being introduced. Chacarita Juniors were drawn in Zone B.

Win Draw Loss

15 August 2019 1	Chacarita Juniors	0–0	All Boys	Buenos Aires, Argentina
21:05 GMT-3		DEPO; Soccerway		Stadium: Estadio Chacarita Juniors; Attendance: 0 (Note: Behind closed doors.); Referee: Leandro Rey Hilfer (Argentina)

24 August 2019 2	Gimnasia y Esgrima (J)	2–1	Chacarita Juniors	San Salvador de Jujuy, Argentina
17:40 GMT-3	G. Castillejos 24'; M. Córdoba 85'	Chacarita Juniors; Jujuy al día Soccerway	B. Mieres 47'	Stadium: Estadio 23 de Agosto; Referee: Julio Barraza (Argentina)

31 August 2019 3	Chacarita Juniors	0–3	Santamarina	Buenos Aires, Argentina
11:35 GMT-3		Chacarita Juniors; El Eco; Soccerway	F. Telechea 37'; V. Depietri 54'; M. Michel 73'	Stadium: Estadio Chacarita Juniors; Referee: Lucas Comesaña (Argentina)

7 September 2019 4	Instituto	–	Chacarita Juniors	Córdoba, Argentina
20:05 GMT-3				Stadium: Estadio Presidente Perón

== Squad statistics ==
=== Appearances and goals ===
No.	Pos.	Nationality	Name	League		Cup		League Cup		Continental		Other		Total		Discipline		Ref
No.	Pos.	Nationality	Name	Apps	Goals	Apps	Goals	Apps	Goals	Apps	Goals	Apps	Goals	Apps	Goals	Yellow card	Red card	Ref
–	GK	Argentina	Lucas Bruera	0	0	—		—		—		0	0	0	0	0	0	
–	GK	Argentina	Sebastián Cuerdo	3	0	—		—		—		0	0	3	0	0	0	
–	GK	Argentina	Matías Montero	0	0	—		—		—		0	0	0	0	0	0	
–	GK	Argentina	Emanuel Trípodi	0	0	—		—		—		0	0	0	0	0	0	
–	CB	Argentina	Gian Croci	0	0	—		—		—		0	0	0	0	0	0	
–	RB	Argentina	Juan Cruz González	1	0	—		—		—		0	0	1	0	0	0	
–	LB	Argentina	Joaquín Ibáñez	1(1)	0	—		—		—		0	0	1(1)	0	0	0	
–	LB	Argentina	Gabriel Lazarte	0	0	—		—		—		0	0	0	0	0	0	
–	CB	Argentina	Alan Ledesma	0	0	—		—		—		0	0	0	0	0	0	
–	RB	Argentina	Brian Mieres	3	1	—		—		—		0	0	3	1	0	0	
–	LB	Argentina	Lautaro Montoya	0	0	—		—		—		0	0	0	0	0	0	
–	RB	Argentina	Nehuen Montoya	0	0	—		—		—		0	0	0	0	0	0	
–	RB	Argentina	Maximiliano Paredes	0	0	—		—		—		0	0	0	0	0	0	
–	CB	Argentina	Alan Robledo	3	0	—		—		—		0	0	3	0	1	0	
–	CB	Argentina	Salvador Sánchez	2	0	—		—		—		0	0	2	0	0	0	
–	CB	Argentina	Gonzalo Soto	0	0	—		—		—		0	0	0	0	0	0	
–	CB	Argentina	Facundo Tallarico	0	0	—		—		—		0	0	0	0	0	0	
–	DF	Argentina	Adrián Torres	3	0	—		—		—		0	0	3	0	0	0	
–	RB	Argentina	Nahuel Tribulo	0	0	—		—		—		0	0	0	0	0	0	
–	CB	Paraguay	Juan Vera	0	0	—		—		—		0	0	0	0	0	0	
–	LM	Argentina	Juan Álvarez	0	0	—		—		—		0	0	0	0	0	0	
–	MF	Argentina	Tomás Cardozo	0	0	—		—		—		0	0	0	0	0	0	
–	MF	Argentina	Nicolás Chávez	0	0	—		—		—		0	0	0	0	0	0	
–	RM	Argentina	Hernán Da Campo	3	0	—		—		—		0	0	3	0	0	0	
–	MF	Argentina	Matías García	1	0	—		—		—		0	0	1	0	1	0	
–	MF	Argentina	Yair González	0	0	—		—		—		0	0	0	0	0	0	
–	AM	Argentina	Gonzalo Groba	1	0	—		—		—		0	0	1	0	0	0	
–	MF	Argentina	Enzo Hoyos	0	0	—		—		—		0	0	0	0	0	0	
–	MF	Argentina	Brian Inveraldi	0	0	—		—		—		0	0	0	0	0	0	
–	LW	Argentina	Facundo Melivilo	0	0	—		—		—		0	0	0	0	0	0	
–	CM	Argentina	Agustín Módula	0	0	—		—		—		0	0	0	0	0	0	
–	CM	Argentina	Zacarías Morán	2	0	—		—		—		0	0	2	0	2	0	
–	CM	Argentina	Matías Nizzo	0	0	—		—		—		0	0	0	0	0	0	
–	CM	Argentina	Agustín Piñeyro	0	0	—		—		—		0	0	0	0	0	0	
–	CM	Argentina	Luciano Perdomo	1(1)	0	—		—		—		0	0	1(1)	0	1	0	
–	RM	Argentina	Diego Rivero	1(1)	0	—		—		—		0	0	1(1)	0	0	0	
–	AM	Argentina	Matías Sánchez	0(1)	0	—		—		—		0	0	0(1)	0	0	0	
–	CM	Argentina	Federico Vismara	0	0	—		—		—		0	0	0	0	0	0	
–	LW	Argentina	Elías Alderete	0(2)	0	—		—		—		0	0	0(2)	0	0	0	
–	LW	Argentina	Ignacio Bailone	2(1)	0	—		—		—		0	0	2(1)	0	0	0	
–	RW	Argentina	Ignacio Cacheiro	3	0	—		—		—		0	0	3	0	0	0	
–	CF	Argentina	Lucas Cano	3	0	—		—		—		0	0	3	0	0	0	
–	RW	Argentina	Maximiliano Casa	0(1)	0	—		—		—		0	0	0(1)	0	0	0	
–	CF	Argentina	Lucas Lezcano	0(1)	0	—		—		—		0	0	0(1)	0	0	0	
–	FW	Argentina	Ariel López	0	0	—		—		—		0	0	0	0	0	0	
–	CF	Uruguay	Juan Cruz Mascia	0	0	—		—		—		0	0	0	0	0	0	
–	FW	Argentina	Tomás Segovia	0	0	—		—		—		0	0	0	0	0	0	
Own goals				—	0	—		—		—		—	0	—	0	—	—	—

Statistics accurate as of 3 September 2019.

=== Goalscorers ===
Rank	Pos	No.	Nat	Name	League	Cup	League Cup	Continental	Other	Total	Ref
1	RB	–	Argentina	Brian Mieres	1	—	—	—	0	1	
Own goals					0	—	—	—	0	0	
Totals					1	—	—	—	0	1	—
