= Adrián Torres =

Argentine footballer (born 1989)

Personal information
- Full name: Adrián Nahuel Torres
- Date of birth: 31 October 1989 (age 37)
- Place of birth: El Talar, Argentina
- Height: 1.77 m (5 ft 10 in)
- Position: Left-back

Team information
- Current team: Flandria

Youth career
- Godoy Cruz
- 2009–2010: Vélez Sarsfield

Senior career*
Years	Team	Apps	(Gls)
2010–2013	Vélez Sarsfield	0	(0)
2010–2012	→ Godoy Cruz (loan)	11	(1)
2012–2013	→ Deportivo Merlo (loan)	22	(0)
2013–2014	Fénix	34	(3)
2014–2015	Atlanta	47	(1)
2016–2019	Almagro	47	(3)
2019–2020	Chacarita Juniors	13	(2)
2020–2021	Gimnasia Jujuy	21	(0)
2022–	Flandria	10	(0)
- * Club domestic league appearances and goals as of 19:49, 10 July 2022 (UTC)

Adrián Nahuel Torres (born 31 October 1989) is an Argentine professional footballer who plays as a left-back for CSD Flandria.

== Career ==
Torres' career began with Godoy Cruz. In 2009, Torres was signed by Argentine Primera División side Vélez Sarsfield. Twelve months later, Torres was loaned back to Godoy Cruz for the 2010–11 and 2011–12 seasons. He made his professional debut in the Primera División on 8 August 2010 versus Boca Juniors, prior to scoring his first senior goal against the same opponents in February 2011. Torres returned to Vélez Sarsfield in 2012, which preceded a loan to Primera B Nacional's Deportivo Merlo. Twenty-three appearances followed. On 30 June 2013, Fénix signed Torres. He scored three in thirty-eight in 2013–14.

Torres joined fellow Primera B Metropolitana team Atlanta in June 2014. His first appearance arrived on 9 August against former club Fénix, with his first goal for Atlanta coming in his next appearance during a home defeat to Chacarita Juniors on 12 August. He was subsequently selected in fifty matches for them across two campaigns. Torres completed a move to Almagro of Primera B Nacional in January 2016.

== Career statistics ==
As of 14 November 2018.

Club statistics
Club	Season	League			Cup (Note: Includes the Copa Argentina)		League Cup		Continental (Note: Includes the Copa Libertadores and Copa Sudamericana)		Other		Total	
Club	Season	Division	Apps	Goals	Apps	Goals	Apps	Goals	Apps	Goals	Apps	Goals	Apps	Goals
Vélez Sarsfield	2010–11	Primera División	0	0	0	0	—		0	0	0	0	0	0
Vélez Sarsfield	2011–12	Primera División	0	0	0	0	—		0	0	0	0	0	0
Vélez Sarsfield	2012–13	Primera División	0	0	0	0	—		0	0	0	0	0	0
Vélez Sarsfield	Total		0	0	0	0	—		0	0	0	0	0	0
Godoy Cruz (loan)	2010–11	Primera División	7	1	0	0	—		0	0	0	0	7	1
Godoy Cruz (loan)	2011–12	Primera División	4	0	0	0	—		0	0	0	0	4	0
Godoy Cruz (loan)	Total		11	1	0	0	—		0	0	0	0	11	1
Deportivo Merlo (loan)	2012–13	Primera B Nacional	22	0	1	0	—		—		0	0	23	0
Fénix	2013–14	Primera B Metropolitana	34	3	2	0	—		—		2 (Note: Two appearances in the 2013–14 Primera B Metropolitana play-offs)	0	38	3
Atlanta	2014	Primera B Metropolitana	18	1	0	0	—		—		0	0	18	1
Atlanta	2015	Primera B Metropolitana	29	0	2	0	—		—		1 (Note: One appearance in the 2015 Primera B Metropolitana play-offs)	0	32	0
Atlanta	Total		47	1	2	0	—		—		1	0	50	1
Almagro	2016	Primera B Nacional	3	0	0	0	—		—		0	0	3	0
Almagro	2016–17	Primera B Nacional	3	0	0	0	—		—		0	0	3	0
Almagro	2017–18	Primera B Nacional	21	1	0	0	—		—		2 (Note: Two appearances in the 2017–18 Primera B Nacional play-offs)	0	23	1
Almagro	2018–19	Primera B Nacional	10	0	3	0	—		—		0	0	13	0
Almagro	Total		37	1	3	0	—		—		2	0	42	1
Career total			151	6	8	0	—		0	0	5	0	164	6
