= Ariel López =

Ariel López may refer to:

- Ariel López (footballer, born 1974), Argentine forward
- Ariel López (footballer, born 2000), Argentine forward
