= Joaquín Ibáñez =

Joaquín Ibáñez may refer to:

- Joaquín Ibáñez (footballer, born 1995), Argentine defender for Chacarita Juniors
- Joaquín Ibáñez (footballer, born 1996), Argentine midfielder for Colón
