= Ignacio Cacheiro =

Argentine footballer

Personal information
- Full name: Ignacio Andrés Cacheiro
- Date of birth: 12 March 1993 (age 33)
- Place of birth: Junín, Argentina
- Height: 1.78 m (5 ft 10 in)
- Position: Forward

Team information
- Current team: Trastevere

Youth career
- River Plate de Junín
- –2013: Sarmiento

Senior career*
| Years | Team | Apps | (Gls) |
| 2014–2018 | Sarmiento | 80 | (9) |
| 2016–2017 | → Guillermo Brown (loan) | 22 | (1) |
| 2018 | Aucas | 20 | (1) |
| 2019 | Patronato | 2 | (0) |
| 2019–2020 | Chacarita Juniors | 15 | (0) |
| 2020–2021 | FC U Craiova | 4 | (0) |
| 2021–2023 | Ilvamaddalena 1903 | 31 | (5) |
| 2023– | Trastevere | 5 | (0) |
- * Club domestic league appearances and goals as of 8 October 2023

Ignacio Andrés Cacheiro (born 12 March 1993) is an Argentine professional footballer who plays as a forward for Italian Serie D club Trastevere.

== Career ==
Cacheiro had a stint with River Plate de Junín before joining Sarmiento. Having made his professional debut in a Primera B Nacional fixture with Unión Santa Fe on 17 February, Cacheiro scored his first senior goal on 24 March during a victory at home to Independiente. He appeared fifty-nine times and scored twice for Sarmiento in Primera B Nacional and in the Argentine Primera División; after the club won promotion in 2014. In August 2016, Cacheiro was loaned to tier two's Guillermo Brown. He returned to Sarmiento for the 2017–18 campaign, in which he netted eight goals in; including a brace over Atlético de Rafaela.

June 2018 saw Cacheiro move to Ecuadorian football with Aucas. He made twenty-two total appearances as they qualified for 2019 Copa Sudamericana, whilst also scoring a sole goal against Macará on 17 August. In January 2019, Cacheiro returned to his homeland with Primera División's Patronato. Fifteen appearances followed. In September 2020, Cacheiro headed to Europe with Romanian Liga II side FC U Craiova.

In September 2021, Cacheiro moved to Italian Eccellenza club ASD Ilvamaddalena 1903. In his first season in Ilvamaddalena, the club was promoted to Serie D for the 2022–23 season.

== Career statistics ==
As of 8 December 2020.

Club statistics
| Club | Season | League | | | Cup | | League Cup | | Continental | | Other | | Total | |
| Club | Season | Division | Apps | Goals | Apps | Goals | Apps | Goals | Apps | Goals | Apps | Goals | Apps | Goals |
|---|---|---|---|---|---|---|---|---|---|---|---|---|---|---|
| Sarmiento | 2013–14 | Primera B Nacional | 16 | 1 | 1 | 0 | — | | — | | 0 | 0 | 17 | 1 |
| Sarmiento | 2014 | Primera B Nacional | 13 | 0 | 0 | 0 | — | | — | | 0 | 0 | 13 | 0 |
| Sarmiento | 2015 | Primera División | 24 | 0 | 1 | 1 | — | | — | | 0 | 0 | 25 | 1 |
| Sarmiento | 2016 | Primera División | 4 | 0 | 0 | 0 | — | | — | | 0 | 0 | 4 | 0 |
| Sarmiento | 2016–17 | Primera División | 0 | 0 | 0 | 0 | — | | — | | 0 | 0 | 0 | 0 |
| Sarmiento | 2017–18 | Primera B Nacional | 23 | 8 | 2 | 1 | — | | — | | 5 (Note: Appearance(s) in the Primera B Nacional play-offs) | 0 | 30 | 9 |
| Sarmiento | Total | | 80 | 9 | 4 | 2 | — | | — | | 5 | 0 | 89 | 11 |
| Guillermo Brown (loan) | 2016–17 | Primera B Nacional | 22 | 1 | 1 | 0 | — | | — | | 0 | 0 | 23 | 1 |
| Aucas | 2018 | Serie A | 20 | 1 | — | | — | | — | | 2 (Note: Appearance(s) in the Serie A play-offs) | 0 | 22 | 1 |
| Patronato | 2018–19 | Primera División | 2 | 0 | 0 | 0 | — | | — | | 0 | 0 | 2 | 0 |
| Chacarita Juniors | 2019–20 | Primera B Nacional | 15 | 0 | 0 | 0 | — | | — | | 0 | 0 | 15 | 0 |
| FC U Craiova | 2020–21 | Liga II | 2 | 0 | 1 | 0 | — | | — | | 0 | 0 | 3 | 0 |
| Career total | | | 141 | 11 | 6 | 2 | — | | — | | 7 | 0 | 154 | 13 |

== Honours ==
FC U Craiova 1948

- Liga II: 2020–21
