= Agustín Módula =

Argentine footballer

Personal information
- Full name: Agustín Alejandro Módula
- Date of birth: 12 March 1993 (age 33)
- Place of birth: Buenos Aires, Argentina
- Height: 1.78 m (5 ft 10 in)
- Position: Central midfielder

Team information
- Current team: México

Senior career*
Years	Team	Apps	(Gls)
2013–2019	Chacarita Juniors	71	(1)
2016	→ Deportivo Español (loan)	5	(0)
2019–2022	Guadalajara	56	(0)
2022–2023	Nissa		
2023–2025	Alcalá	49	(3)
2025–	México	3	(0)
- * Club domestic league appearances and goals as of 21 September 2025

Agustín Alejandro Módula (born 12 March 1993) is an Argentine professional footballer who plays as a central midfielder for Spanish Tercera Federación club México.

== Career ==
Módula made his Chacarita Juniors debut during the 2012–13 Primera B Metropolitana season, he played the final thirteen minutes as Chacarita won 3–4 away to Deportivo Morón. Twenty-seven appearances followed throughout his first three seasons in Primera B Metropolitana, including five in 2014 as the club won promotion. He featured twelve times in the 2015 Primera B Nacional, prior to leaving Chacarita on loan for the 2016 campaign to join Deportivo Español in the third tier. He played five times for them as they finished 17th, before returning to Chacarita for the forthcoming 2016–17 in Primera B Nacional.

In 2016–17, Módula scored the first goal of his career on 2 June 2017 against Almagro prior to receiving his first red card versus Los Andes over a month later. Weeks after that sending off, Chacarita secured promotion to the 2017–18 Argentine Primera División. On 3 September 2019, Módula was announced as a new signing of Spanish Tercera División side Guadalajara. His debut arrived on 7 September in a win away from home against Albacete B, as he replaced Lautaro Ruiz after sixty-one minutes.

== Career statistics ==
As of 24 June 2020.

Club statistics
Club	Season	League			Cup		League Cup		Continental		Other		Total	
Club	Season	Division	Apps	Goals	Apps	Goals	Apps	Goals	Apps	Goals	Apps	Goals	Apps	Goals
Chacarita Juniors	2012–13	Primera B Metropolitana	5	0	1	0	—		—		0	0	6	0
Chacarita Juniors	2013–14	Primera B Metropolitana	18	0	3	0	—		—		0	0	21	0
Chacarita Juniors	2014	Primera B Metropolitana	5	0	0	0	—		—		0	0	5	0
Chacarita Juniors	2015	Primera B Nacional	12	0	2	0	—		—		0	0	14	0
Chacarita Juniors	2016	Primera B Nacional	0	0	0	0	—		—		0	0	0	0
Chacarita Juniors	2016–17	Primera B Nacional	12	1	0	0	—		—		0	0	12	1
Chacarita Juniors	2017–18	Primera División	12	0	0	0	—		—		0	0	12	0
Chacarita Juniors	2018–19	Primera B Nacional	0	0	0	0	—		—		0	0	0	0
Chacarita Juniors	Total		64	1	6	0	—		—		0	0	70	1
Deportivo Español (loan)	2016	Primera B Metropolitana	5	0	0	0	—		—		0	0	5	0
Guadalajara	2019–20	Tercera División	20	0	0	0	—		—		0	0	20	0
Career total			89	1	6	0	—		—		0	0	95	1
