= Yair González =

Argentine footballer (born 2002)

Personal information
- Date of birth: 21 March 2002 (age 24)
- Place of birth: Argentina
- Height: 1.73 m (5 ft 8 in)
- Position: Midfielder

Team information
- Current team: Club Deportivo Morón (on loan from Argentinos Juniors)
- Number: 10

Youth career
- Chacarita Juniors

Senior career*
Years	Team	Apps	(Gls)
2019–2020	Chacarita Juniors	17	(3)
2020	Unión La Calera	0	(0)
2021–	Argentinos Juniors	0	(0)
2023	→ Houston Dynamo 2 (loan)	23	(4)
2024	→ Sud América (loan)	14	(0)
2025–	→ Deportivo Morón (loan)	21	(5)

International career
- Argentina U15
- * Club domestic league appearances and goals as of 17:41, 4 August 2025 (UTC)

Yair González (born 21 March 2002) is an Argentine professional footballer who plays as a midfielder for Deportivo Morón on loan from Argentinos Juniors.

== Club career ==
González broke through into first-team football with Chacarita Juniors in 2018–19. He was initially an unused substitute for Primera B Nacional fixtures with Mitre and Deportivo Morón, before appearing for his senior bow on 23 February 2019 against Sarmiento; playing twenty-two minutes of a home loss, having come on in place of Joaquín Ibáñez. After not turning up to Chacarita's virtual training during the COVID-19 pandemic, the club confirmed on 24 November 2020, that they had terminated the players contract.

Subsequently, there were several rumors that González had signed with Chilean club Unión La Calera. On 10 February 2021, González joined Argentine Primera División club Argentinos Juniors on a three-year deal, after being released from .

== International career ==
In August 2017, González was called up by the Argentina U15s ahead of friendlies with their Paraguayan counterparts. He appeared in the first encounter on 7 August.

== Career statistics ==
As of 20 April 2019.

Appearances and goals by club, season and competition
Club	Season	League			Cup		League Cup		Continental		Other		Total	
Club	Season	Division	Apps	Goals	Apps	Goals	Apps	Goals	Apps	Goals	Apps	Goals	Apps	Goals
Chacarita Juniors	2018–19	Primera B Nacional	1	0	0	0	—		—		0	0	1	0
Career total			1	0	0	0	—		—		0	0	1	0
