= Juan Álvarez (footballer, born 1997) =

Argentine footballer

Personal information
- Full name: Juan Ignacio Álvarez Morinigo
- Date of birth: 27 October 1997 (age 29)
- Place of birth: El Palomar, Argentina
- Height: 1.76 m (5 ft 9 1/2 in)
- Position: Midfielder

Team information
- Current team: Flandria

Youth career
- Chacarita Juniors

Senior career*
Years	Team	Apps	(Gls)
2016–2021	Chacarita Juniors	75	(2)
2020–2021	→ Panetolikos (loan)	16	(0)
2022–	Flandria	5	(0)
- * Club domestic league appearances and goals as of 14:44, 11 July 2022 (UTC)

Juan Ignacio Álvarez Morinigo (born 27 October 1997) is an Argentine professional footballer who plays as a midfielder for Chacarita Juniors.

== Club career ==
Álvarez's senior career started with Chacarita Juniors, then of Primera B Nacional. He played twenty-seven times in 2016–17, including his debut on 27 August 2016 in a 1–1 draw versus Instituto. 2016–17 ended with promotion to the Argentine Primera División. He signed a new contract with Chacarita in September 2017. Álvarez's top-flight debut came against Independiente on 15 October, while two weeks later he scored his first professional goal in a 2–1 defeat to Newell's Old Boys.

== Career statistics ==
As of 15 May 2018.

Club statistics
Club	Season	League			Cup (Note: Includes the Copa Argentina)		League Cup		Continental		Other		Total	
Club	Season	Division	Apps	Goals	Apps	Goals	Apps	Goals	Apps	Goals	Apps	Goals	Apps	Goals
Chacarita Juniors	2016–17	Primera B Nacional	27	0	0	0	—		—		0	0	27	0
Chacarita Juniors	2017–18	Primera División	16	1	0	0	—		—		0	0	16	1
Career total			43	1	0	0	—		—		0	0	43	1
