= Gian Croci =

Argentine professional footballer

Personal information
- Full name: Gian Croci
- Date of birth: 4 January 1998 (age 28)
- Place of birth: Haedo, Argentina
- Height: 1.77 m (5 ft 9 1/2 in)
- Position: Centre-back

Team information
- Current team: Argentino de Quilmes

Youth career
- Chacarita Juniors

Senior career*
Years	Team	Apps	(Gls)
2017–2020	Chacarita Juniors	8	(0)
2022	Puerto Nuevo	7	(0)
2022–	Argentino de Quilmes	5	(0)
- * Club domestic league appearances and goals as of 19:15, 10 July 2022 (UTC)

Gian Croci (born 4 January 1998) is an Argentine professional footballer who plays as a centre-back for Argentino de Quilmes.

== Career ==
Croci first appeared on a first-team teamsheet for Chacarita Juniors in March 2017, as he was unused in a home loss to Nueva Chicago. A week later, on 15 March, Croci made his professional debut in Primera B Nacional after playing the final eleven minutes in a goalless draw with Villa Dálmine.

== Career statistics ==
As of 12 May 2018.

Club statistics
Club	Season	League			Cup (Note: Includes the Copa Argentina)		League Cup		Continental		Other		Total	
Club	Season	Division	Apps	Goals	Apps	Goals	Apps	Goals	Apps	Goals	Apps	Goals	Apps	Goals
Chacarita Juniors	2016–17	Primera B Nacional	1	0	0	0	—		—		0	0	1	0
Chacarita Juniors	2017–18	Primera División	4	0	0	0	—		—		0	0	4	0
Career total			5	0	0	0	—		—		0	0	5	0
