= Tomás Segovia =

Tomás Segovia may refer to:

- Tomás Segovia (footballer), Argentine forward
- Tomás Segovia (poet), Mexican writer
