= Maximiliano Paredes =

Argentine footballer (born 1991)

Personal information
- Full name: Maximiliano Hernán Paredes
- Date of birth: 26 March 1991 (age 35)
- Place of birth: Villa Tesei, Argentina
- Height: 1.77 m (5 ft 10 in)
- Position: Right-back

Team information
- Current team: Ituzaingó

Youth career
- Chacarita Juniors

Senior career*
Years	Team	Apps	(Gls)
2010–2020	Chacarita Juniors	154	(5)
2016	→ Quilmes (loan)	4	(0)
2017–2019	→ Deportivo Morón (loan)	39	(1)
2019–2020	→ Atlético de Rafaela (loan)	7	(0)
2020–2021	Sarmiento	8	(0)
2021–2022	Sol de Mayo	61	(5)
2023–	Ituzaingó	22	(0)
- * Club domestic league appearances and goals as of 19:53, 27 July 2023 (UTC)

Maximiliano Hernán Paredes (born 26 March 1991) is an Argentine professional footballer who plays as a right-back for Ituzaingó.

== Career ==
Paredes' career began with Chacarita Juniors. He made his professional debut in the Argentine Primera División on 23 April 2010 against Godoy Cruz, with further appearances coming in the following month over Vélez Sarsfield and Racing Club in a season which ended with relegation to the 2010–11 Primera B Nacional. In the following six campaigns, Paredes participated in one hundred and twenty-eight league fixtures for the club. On 10 January 2016, Paredes departed the second tier team to join Primera División side Quilmes on loan. Four appearances followed in 2016 as they came second-bottom in Zone 1.

He returned to Chacarita Juniors for the 2016–17 Primera B Nacional, appearing twenty-four times in all competitions as they won promotion to the top-flight. August 2017 saw Paredes leave on loan again, signing for Primera B Nacional's Deportivo Morón. His first goal for them arrived in the following March in an away win versus All Boys. He remained for two seasons, making forty-two appearances. A third loan away from Chacarita was completed in July 2019, as the defender agreed terms with fellow Primera B Nacional team Atlético de Rafaela. A debut soon occurred against Brown in August.

Paredes completed a permanent move to Torneo Federal A's Sarmiento in August 2020. In February 2021, Peredes joined Torneo Argentino A club Club Sol de Mayo. Ahead of 2023, Paredes signed with Ituzaingó.

== Career statistics ==
As of 28 October 2020.

Club statistics
Club	Season	League			Cup		League Cup		Continental		Other		Total	
Club	Season	Division	Apps	Goals	Apps	Goals	Apps	Goals	Apps	Goals	Apps	Goals	Apps	Goals
Chacarita Juniors	2009–10	Primera División	3	0	0	0	—		—		0	0	3	0
Chacarita Juniors	2010–11	Primera B Nacional	1	0	0	0	—		—		0	0	1	0
Chacarita Juniors	2011–12	Primera B Nacional	13	0	1	0	—		—		2 (Note: Appearance(s) in the Primera B Nacional play-offs)	0	16	0
Chacarita Juniors	2012–13	Primera B Metropolitana	24	0	1	0	—		—		0	0	25	0
Chacarita Juniors	2013–14	Primera B Metropolitana	34	0	3	0	—		—		0	0	37	0
Chacarita Juniors	2014	Primera B Metropolitana	16	4	0	0	—		—		0	0	16	4
Chacarita Juniors	2015	Primera B Nacional	40	1	5	0	—		—		0	0	45	1
Chacarita Juniors	2016	Primera B Nacional	0	0	0	0	—		—		0	0	0	0
Chacarita Juniors	2016–17	Primera B Nacional	23	0	1	0	—		—		0	0	24	0
Chacarita Juniors	2017–18	Primera División	0	0	0	0	—		—		0	0	0	0
Chacarita Juniors	2018–19	Primera B Nacional	0	0	0	0	—		—		0	0	0	0
Chacarita Juniors	2019–20	Primera B Nacional	0	0	0	0	—		—		0	0	0	0
Chacarita Juniors	Total		154	5	11	0	—		—		2	0	167	5
Quilmes (loan)	2016	Primera División	4	0	0	0	—		—		0	0	4	0
Deportivo Morón (loan)	2017–18	Primera B Nacional	19	1	2	0	—		—		0	0	21	1
Deportivo Morón (loan)	2018–19	Primera B Nacional	20	0	1	0	—		—		0	0	21	0
Deportivo Morón (loan)	Total		39	1	3	0	—		—		0	0	42	1
Atlético de Rafaela (loan)	2019–20	Primera B Nacional	7	0	0	0	—		—		0	0	7	0
Sarmiento	2020–21	Torneo Federal A	0	0	0	0	—		—		0	0	0	0
Career total			204	6	14	0	—		—		2	0	220	6
