= Matías García (footballer, born 1995) =

Argentine footballer

Personal information
- Full name: Matías Ignacio García
- Date of birth: 11 November 1995 (age 30)
- Place of birth: Buenos Aires, Argentina
- Height: 1.79 m (5 ft 10 1/2 in)
- Position: Central midfielder

Team information
- Current team: Deportivo Riestra
- Number: 20

Youth career
- Argentinos Juniors

Senior career*
Years	Team	Apps	(Gls)
2013–2017	Argentinos Juniors	0	(0)
2017–2018	San Lorenzo	0	(0)
2018	→ Arsenal de Sarandí (loan)	3	(0)
2018–2019	Unión Santa Fe	0	(0)
2019–2020	Chacarita Juniors	2	(0)
2020–2021	LDU Portoviejo	18	(0)
2021–2022	Defensores de Belgrano	7	(0)
2022–2023	Sol de Mayo	29	(1)
2023–2024	Güemes	31	(0)
2024–2026	San Martín Tucumán	68	(2)
2026–	Deportivo Riestra	10	(0)
- * Club domestic league appearances and goals as of 17:17, 7 May 2026 (UTC)

Matías Ignacio García (born 11 November 1995) is an Argentine professional footballer who plays as a central midfielder for Deportivo Riestra.

== Career ==
García's career began with Argentinos Juniors. He made his senior debut with them in the Copa Argentina against Sportivo Belgrano on 23 March 2013. In July 2017, García joined San Lorenzo. Six months later, without featuring for San Lorenzo, García was loaned to fellow Primera División team Arsenal de Sarandí. He made his professional debut on 18 March 2018 during a draw with Vélez Sarsfield, which was one of three league appearances as they suffered relegation to Primera B Nacional. After returning to his parent club in June 2018, Unión Santa Fe signed García a month later.

García didn't appear in the league for Unión Santa Fe, though did play the full duration of a Copa de la Superliga first round first leg draw away to San Martín on 13 April 2019. In the succeeding August, García headed down to the second tier to play for Chacarita Juniors. He made appearances against Santamarina and Instituto in August and September, prior to departing in January 2020 to Ecuadorian Serie A side LDU Portoviejo. His debut arrived on 16 February during a 2–1 loss away to El Nacional, which preceded seventeen further matches as they suffered relegation via goal difference.

== Career statistics ==
As of 24 December 2020.

Club statistics
Club	Season	League			Cup		League Cup		Continental		Other		Total	
Club	Season	Division	Apps	Goals	Apps	Goals	Apps	Goals	Apps	Goals	Apps	Goals	Apps	Goals
Argentinos Juniors	2012–13	Primera División	0	0	1	0	—		0	0	0	0	1	0
Argentinos Juniors	2013–14	Primera División	0	0	0	0	—		—		0	0	0	0
Argentinos Juniors	2014	Primera B Nacional	0	0	0	0	—		—		0	0	0	0
Argentinos Juniors	2015	Primera División	0	0	0	0	—		—		0	0	0	0
Argentinos Juniors	2016	Primera División	0	0	0	0	—		—		0	0	0	0
Argentinos Juniors	2016–17	Primera B Nacional	0	0	0	0	—		—		0	0	0	0
Argentinos Juniors	Total		0	0	1	0	—		0	0	0	0	1	0
San Lorenzo	2017–18	Primera División	0	0	0	0	—		0	0	0	0	0	0
Arsenal de Sarandí (loan)	2017–18	Primera División	3	0	1	0	—		0	0	0	0	4	0
Unión Santa Fe	2018–19	Primera División	0	0	0	0	1	0	0	0	0	0	1	0
Chacarita Juniors	2019–20	Primera B Nacional	2	0	0	0	—		—		0	0	2	0
LDU Portoviejo	2020	Serie A	18	0	0	0	—		—		0	0	18	0
Career total			23	0	2	0	1	0	0	0	0	0	26	0
