= Alan Ledesma =

Alan Ledesma may refer to:

- Alan Ledesma (actor) (1977–2008), Mexican actor
- Alan Ledesma (footballer) (born 1998), Argentine footballer
