= Nahuel Tribulo =

Argentine footballer

Personal information
- Full name: Nahuel Tribulo
- Date of birth: 25 June 1997 (age 29)
- Place of birth: Morón, Argentina
- Height: 1.76 m (5 ft 9 1/2 in)
- Position: Defender

Team information
- Current team: General Lamadrid

Youth career
- Chacarita Juniors

Senior career*
Years	Team	Apps	(Gls)
2015–2019	Chacarita Juniors	1	(0)
2018–2019	→ Luján (loan)	9	(0)
2019–	General Lamadrid	8	(0)
- * Club domestic league appearances and goals as of 00:21, 24 March 2020 (UTC)

Nahuel Tribulo (born 25 June 1997) is an Argentine professional footballer who plays as a defender for Club Atlético General Lamadrid.

== Career ==
Tribulo's career started with Primera B Nacional side Chacarita Juniors. He made his professional career debut in 2015, playing the full match in an away defeat to Estudiantes on 15 November. He signed a new contract with the club in December 2016. On 25 July 2018, Luján of Primera C Metropolitana loaned Tribulo.

== Career statistics ==
As of 7 September 2018.

Club statistics
Club	Season	League			Cup (Note: Includes the Copa Argentina)		League Cup		Continental		Other		Total	
Club	Season	Division	Apps	Goals	Apps	Goals	Apps	Goals	Apps	Goals	Apps	Goals	Apps	Goals
Chacarita Juniors	2015	Primera B Nacional	1	0	0	0	—		—		0	0	1	0
Chacarita Juniors	2016	Primera B Nacional	0	0	0	0	—		—		0	0	0	0
Chacarita Juniors	2016–17	Primera B Nacional	0	0	0	0	—		—		0	0	0	0
Chacarita Juniors	2017–18	Primera División	0	0	0	0	—		—		0	0	0	0
Chacarita Juniors	2018–19	Primera B Nacional	0	0	0	0	—		—		0	0	0	0
Chacarita Juniors	Total		1	0	0	0	—		—		0	0	1	0
Luján (loan)	2018–19	Primera C Metropolitana	0	0	0	0	—		—		0	0	0	0
Career total			1	0	0	0	—		—		0	0	1	0
