= Matías Nizzo =

Argentine footballer

Personal information
- Full name: Matías Ezequiel Nizzo
- Date of birth: 2 February 1989 (age 37)
- Place of birth: Zárate, Argentina
- Height: 1.73 m (5 ft 8 in)
- Position: Central midfielder

Team information
- Current team: Villa Dalmine Campana

Youth career
- Chacarita Juniors

Senior career*
Years	Team	Apps	(Gls)
2011–2020	Chacarita Juniors	113	(1)
2016–2018	→ Instituto (loan)	32	(2)
2018–2020	→ Deportivo Morón (loan)	40	(1)
2020–2021	Lorca Deportiva	0	(0)
2021	Sportivo Estudiantes	17	(0)
2021	Altos Hornos Zapla	6	(0)
2022	Sol de Mayo	6	(0)
2022–	Independiente Chivilcoy	4	(0)
- * Club domestic league appearances and goals as of 14:40, 11 July 2022 (UTC)

Matías Ezequiel Nizzo (born 2 February 1989) is an Argentine professional footballer who plays as a central midfielder for Villa Dalmine Campana

== Career ==
Nizzo began his footballing career with Chacarita Juniors of Primera B Nacional. His first appearance for the club came on 4 April 2011 in a 1–1 draw with Belgrano, that was the first of thirty-one appearances in his opening two seasons with Chacarita in Primera B Nacional. At the end of 2011–12, Chacarita were relegated to Primera B Metropolitana. In the third tier, Nizzo played forty-two times over two seasons, 2012–13 and 2013–14, with the latter ending in promotion. On 28 July 2016, Nizzo joined Instituto on a one-year loan; a team he scored his first pro goal against in 2012. Instituto extended his loan in 2017.

Primera B Nacional side Deportivo Morón loaned Nizzo in June 2018. He scored one goal in forty-one matches in all competitions, having remained for two seasons. September 2020 saw Nizzo head abroad for the first time, as he agreed terms with newly promoted Lorca Deportiva of Spain's Segunda División B. He suffered a serious ruptured achilles tendon injury in training in October, leaving him on the sidelines for four to six months.

== Career statistics ==
As of 25 December 2020.

Club statistics
Club	Season	League			Cup		League Cup		Continental		Other		Total	
Club	Season	Division	Apps	Goals	Apps	Goals	Apps	Goals	Apps	Goals	Apps	Goals	Apps	Goals
Chacarita Juniors	2010–11	Primera B Nacional	7	0	0	0	—		—		0	0	7	0
Chacarita Juniors	2011–12	Primera B Nacional	23	1	2	0	—		—		1 (Note: Appearance(s) in the Primera B Nacional play-offs)	0	26	1
Chacarita Juniors	2012–13	Primera B Metropolitana	21	0	1	0	—		—		0	0	22	0
Chacarita Juniors	2013–14	Primera B Metropolitana	21	0	1	0	—		—		0	0	22	0
Chacarita Juniors	2014	Primera B Metropolitana	0	0	0	0	—		—		0	0	0	0
Chacarita Juniors	2015	Primera B Nacional	32	0	4	0	—		—		0	0	36	0
Chacarita Juniors	2016	Primera B Nacional	9	0	0	0	—		—		0	0	9	0
Chacarita Juniors	2016–17	Primera B Nacional	0	0	0	0	—		—		0	0	0	0
Chacarita Juniors	2017–18	Primera División	0	0	0	0	—		—		0	0	0	0
Chacarita Juniors	2018–19	Primera B Nacional	0	0	0	0	—		—		0	0	0	0
Chacarita Juniors	2019–20	Primera B Nacional	0	0	0	0	—		—		0	0	0	0
Chacarita Juniors	Total		113	1	8	0	—		—		1	0	122	1
Instituto (loan)	2016–17	Primera B Nacional	23	2	1	0	—		—		0	0	24	2
Instituto (loan)	2017–18	Primera B Nacional	9	0	0	0	—		—		1	0	10	0
Instituto (loan)	Total		32	2	1	0	—		—		1	0	34	2
Deportivo Morón (loan)	2018–19	Primera B Nacional	22	1	1	0	—		—		0	0	23	1
Deportivo Morón (loan)	2019–20	Primera B Nacional	18	0	0	0	—		—		0	0	18	0
Deportivo Morón (loan)	Total		40	1	0	0	—		—		0	0	41	1
Lorca Deportiva	2020–21	Segunda División B	0	0	0	0	0	0	—		0	0	0	0
Career total			185	4	10	0	0	0	—		2	0	197	4
