= C.A. Fénix =

C.A. Fénix may refer to:

- Centro Atlético Fénix, Uruguayan football club
- Club Atlético Fénix, Argentine football club
