= Matías Sánchez (footballer, born 1996) =

Argentine footballer

Personal information
- Full name: Matías Santiago Sánchez
- Date of birth: 5 July 1996 (age 30)
- Place of birth: San Martín, Argentina
- Height: 1.73 m (5 ft 8 in)
- Position: Midfielder

Team information
- Current team: Mitre

Youth career
- 2006–2013: Chacarita Juniors

Senior career*
| Years | Team | Apps | (Gls) |
| 2013–2021 | Chacarita Juniors | 41 | (1) |
| 2014 | → River Plate (loan) | 0 | (0) |
| 2016–2018 | → Lanús (loan) | 13 | (1) |
| 2022 | Atlético Paraná | 9 | (1) |
| 2022– | Mitre | 0 | (0) |

International career
| 2013 | Argentina U17 | 11 | (4) |
| 2014 | Argentina U20 | 2 | (0) |
- * Club domestic league appearances and goals as of 20:22, 10 July 2022 (UTC)

Matías Santiago Sánchez (born 5 July 1996) is an Argentine professional footballer who plays as a midfielder for Mitre.

== Career ==
=== Club ===
Sánchez began his senior career with Chacarita Juniors. He made his professional debut on 21 March 2012 in a Copa Argentina match against Gimnasia y Esgrima. He featured once in Primera B Metropolitana in 2012–13 before not playing for the first-team again until February 2015. He had a loan spell with River Plate in 2014. After returning to Charcarita, he scored his first professional goal in a 3–2 defeat to Estudiantes in November 2015. In total, Sánchez made sixteen appearances and scored once for Chacarita by the end of 2015. In January 2016, Sánchez completed a two-season loan move to Lanús.

He failed to feature until midway through the 2016–17 season, during which he made seven appearances and scored one goal.

=== International ===
Sánchez played eleven times and scored four goals for the Argentina U17s. He scored two goals in five games at the 2013 South American Under-17 Football Championship as Argentina won the tournament, while he also scored twice in six matches during the 2013 FIFA U-17 World Cup in the United Arab Emirates as Argentina placed 4th. He also won two caps for the U20 team at the 2014 L'Alcúdia International Football Tournament.

== Career statistics ==
As of 8 September 2018.

Club statistics
| Club | Season | League | | | Cup (Note: Includes the Copa Argentina) | | League Cup | | Continental (Note: Includes the Copa Libertadores and Copa Sudamericana) | | Other | | Total | |
| Club | Season | Division | Apps | Goals | Apps | Goals | Apps | Goals | Apps | Goals | Apps | Goals | Apps | Goals |
|---|---|---|---|---|---|---|---|---|---|---|---|---|---|---|
| Chacarita Juniors | 2011–12 | Primera B Nacional | 0 | 0 | 1 | 0 | — | | — | | 0 | 0 | 1 | 0 |
| Chacarita Juniors | 2012–13 | Primera B Metropolitana | 1 | 0 | 0 | 0 | — | | — | | 0 | 0 | 1 | 0 |
| Chacarita Juniors | 2013–14 | Primera B Metropolitana | 0 | 0 | 0 | 0 | — | | — | | 0 | 0 | 0 | 0 |
| Chacarita Juniors | 2014 | Primera B Metropolitana | 0 | 0 | 0 | 0 | — | | — | | 0 | 0 | 0 | 0 |
| Chacarita Juniors | 2015 | Primera B Nacional | 15 | 1 | 3 | 0 | — | | — | | 0 | 0 | 18 | 1 |
| Chacarita Juniors | 2016 | Primera B Nacional | 0 | 0 | 0 | 0 | — | | — | | 0 | 0 | 0 | 0 |
| Chacarita Juniors | 2016–17 | Primera B Nacional | 0 | 0 | 0 | 0 | — | | — | | 0 | 0 | 0 | 0 |
| Chacarita Juniors | 2017–18 | Primera División | 0 | 0 | 0 | 0 | — | | — | | 0 | 0 | 0 | 0 |
| Chacarita Juniors | 2018–19 | Primera B Nacional | 1 | 0 | 0 | 0 | — | | — | | 0 | 0 | 1 | 0 |
| Chacarita Juniors | Total | | 17 | 1 | 4 | 0 | — | | — | | 0 | 0 | 21 | 1 |
| River Plate (loan) | 2014 | Primera División | 0 | 0 | 0 | 0 | — | | 0 | 0 | 0 | 0 | 0 | 0 |
| Lanús (loan) | 2016 | Primera División | 0 | 0 | 0 | 0 | — | | 0 | 0 | 0 | 0 | 0 | 0 |
| Lanús (loan) | 2016–17 | Primera División | 7 | 1 | 1 | 1 | — | | 1 (Note: One appearance in 2017 Copa Libertadores) | 0 | 0 | 0 | 9 | 2 |
| Lanús (loan) | 2017–18 | Primera División | 6 | 0 | 0 | 0 | — | | 0 | 0 | 0 | 0 | 6 | 0 |
| Lanús (loan) | Total | | 13 | 1 | 1 | 1 | — | | 1 | 0 | 0 | 0 | 15 | 2 |
| Career total | | | 30 | 2 | 5 | 1 | — | | 1 | 0 | 0 | 0 | 36 | 3 |

== Honours ==
Argentina U17

- South American Under-17 Football Championship: 2013
