= Lazarte =

Lazarte is a Basque surname. Notable people with the surname include:

- Gabriel Lazarte (born 1997), Argentine footballer
- Luis Alberto Lazarte (born 1971), Argentine boxer
