= Brian Mieres =

Argentine footballer

Personal information
- Full name: Brian Luis Mieres
- Date of birth: 28 July 1995 (age 31)
- Place of birth: Paso de los Libres, Argentina
- Height: 1.81 m (5 ft 11 1/2 in)
- Position: Right-back

Team information
- Current team: Mitre

Youth career
- Pumitas
- Pamperito
- AFIL
- Panificaciones
- 2008–2016: San Lorenzo

Senior career*
Years	Team	Apps	(Gls)
2016–2018	San Lorenzo	0	(0)
2017–2018	→ Almagro (loan)	24	(1)
2018–2019	Mitre	19	(2)
2019–2020	Chacarita Juniors	20	(1)
2020–2023	Alvarado	60	(1)
2023–	Mitre	72	(0)
- * Club domestic league appearances and goals as of 17:51, 14 August 2025 (UTC)

Brian Luis Mieres (born 28 July 1995) is an Argentine professional footballer who plays as a right-back for Mitre.

== Career ==
Mieres played for various youth clubs, having spells with Pumitas, Pamperito, AFIL and Panificaciones before joining San Lorenzo in 2008. In 2016, he was moved into the club's senior squad for an Argentine Primera División match with Arsenal de Sarandí on 12 March but was an unused sub. He made his debut on 19 April during a home draw against L.D.U. Quito in the Copa Libertadores, playing seventy-five minutes before being substituted for Facundo Quignon. On 6 August 2017, Primera B Nacional's Almagro loaned Mieres. In his fourteenth appearance he scored his first career goal versus Los Andes on 11 February 2018.

In July 2018, Mitre became Mieres' third career club. After two goals in twenty total games, Mieres departed in July 2019 to Chacarita Juniors. His contract with them expired on 30 June 2020.

On 27 July 2020, Mieres joined Alvarado.

== Career statistics ==
As of 4 July 2020.

Club statistics
Club	Season	League			Cup		League Cup		Continental		Other		Total	
Club	Season	Division	Apps	Goals	Apps	Goals	Apps	Goals	Apps	Goals	Apps	Goals	Apps	Goals
San Lorenzo	2016	Primera División	0	0	0	0	—		1 (Note: Appearance(s) in the Copa Libertadores)	0	0	0	1	0
San Lorenzo	2016–17	Primera División	0	0	1	0	—		0	0	0	0	1	0
San Lorenzo	2017–18	Primera División	0	0	0	0	—		0	0	0	0	0	0
San Lorenzo	Total		0	0	1	0	—		1	0	0	0	2	0
Almagro (loan)	2017–18	Primera B Nacional	24	1	0	0	—		—		0	0	24	1
Mitre	2018–19	Primera B Nacional	19	2	1	0	—		—		0	0	20	2
Chacarita Juniors	2019–20	Primera B Nacional	20	1	0	0	—		—		0	0	20	1
Career total			63	4	2	0	—		1	0	0	0	66	4
