= Ariel López (footballer, born 2000) =

Argentine footballer

Personal information
- Full name: Ariel David López
- Date of birth: 1 July 2000 (age 26)
- Place of birth: Villa Ortúzar, Argentina
- Height: 1.78 m (5 ft 10 in)
- Position: Forward

Team information
- Current team: Fénix de Pilar (on loan from Chacarita Juniors)

Youth career
- Chacarita Juniors

Senior career*
Years	Team	Apps	(Gls)
2019–	Chacarita Juniors	12	(0)
2022–	→ Fénix de Pilar (loan)	5	(0)
- * Club domestic league appearances and goals as of 19:41, 10 July 2022 (UTC)

Ariel David López (born 1 July 2000) is an Argentine professional footballer who plays as a forward for Fénix de Pilar, on loan from Chacarita Juniors.

== Career ==
López started out his career with Chacarita Juniors. A goalless draw with Deportivo Morón on 2 February 2019 saw López make his first appearance in professional football, coming off the bench in place of Elías Alderete with five minutes remaining. In January 2022, López joined Fénix de Pilar on a one-year loan deal.

== Career statistics ==
As of 3 February 2019.

Club statistics
Club	Season	League			Cup		Continental		Other		Total	
Club	Season	Division	Apps	Goals	Apps	Goals	Apps	Goals	Apps	Goals	Apps	Goals
Chacarita Juniors	2018–19	Primera B Nacional	1	0	0	0	—		0	0	1	0
Career total			1	0	0	0	—		0	0	1	0
