= Lucas Lezcano =

Argentine footballer

Personal information
- Full name: Lucas Lezcano
- Date of birth: 9 July 1999 (age 27)
- Place of birth: Villa Ballester, Argentina
- Height: 1.77 m (5 ft 9 1/2 in)
- Position: Forward

Team information
- Current team: Colegiales

Youth career
- Chacarita Juniors

Senior career*
Years	Team	Apps	(Gls)
2017–2021	Chacarita Juniors	28	(1)
2022	Quilmes	1	(0)
2022–	Colegiales	2	(1)
- * Club domestic league appearances and goals as of 20:40, 10 July 2022 (UTC)

Lucas Lezcano (born 9 July 1999) is an Argentine professional footballer who plays as a forward for Colegiales.

== Career ==
Lezcano's career started with Chacarita Juniors. His first-team bow arrived in July 2017 in the Copa Argentina against Guillermo Brown, with the forward replacing Yefri Reyes after eighty-three minutes of a 1–0 defeat. He made his professional league debut during an Argentine Primera División home match with Temperley on 27 April 2018, which was one of three appearances in the club's relegation campaign of 2017–18.

== Career statistics ==
As of 9 December 2018.

Club statistics
Club	Season	League			Cup (Note: Includes the Copa Argentina)		League Cup		Continental		Other		Total	
Club	Season	Division	Apps	Goals	Apps	Goals	Apps	Goals	Apps	Goals	Apps	Goals	Apps	Goals
Chacarita Juniors	2017–18	Primera División	3	0	2	0	—		—		0	0	5	0
Chacarita Juniors	2018–19	Primera B Nacional	2	0	0	0	—		—		0	0	2	0
Career total			5	0	2	0	—		—		0	0	7	0
