= Juan Cruz González =

Argentine footballer

Personal information
- Date of birth: 2 December 1996 (age 29)
- Place of birth: Córdoba, Argentina
- Height: 1.71 m (5 ft 7 in)
- Position: Right-back

Team information
- Current team: Sporting Cristal
- Number: 18

Youth career
- Chacarita Juniors

Senior career*
Years	Team	Apps	(Gls)
2016–2025	Chacarita Juniors	165	(13)
2021	→ Central Córdoba SdE (loan)	19	(0)
2024	→ Aucas (loan)	27	(2)
2026–	Sporting Cristal	5	(0)
- * Club domestic league appearances and goals as of 17:42, 13 June 2025 (UTC)

Juan Cruz González (born 2 December 1996) is an Argentine professional footballer who plays as a right-back for Liga 1 club Sporting Cristal.

== Career ==
González began his Chacarita Juniors career in 2016, he was an unused substitute for a Primera B Nacional game against Juventud Unida on 27 February. On 8 March, González made his professional debut for the club in an away league victory to Villa Dálmine. Fifteen further appearances came during 2016, prior to twenty-one in 2016–17 which included his first career goal on 16 September 2016 versus Crucero del Norte; Chacarita won promotion to the Argentine Primera División in 2016–17. His debut in the top-flight arrived on 17 September 2017 against Atlético Tucumán.

== Personal life ==
In September 2020, it was confirmed that González had tested positive for COVID-19 amid the pandemic; he was asymptomatic.

== Career statistics ==
As of 21 September 2020.

Club statistics
Club	Season	League			Cup		League Cup		Continental		Other		Total	
Club	Season	Division	Apps	Goals	Apps	Goals	Apps	Goals	Apps	Goals	Apps	Goals	Apps	Goals
Chacarita Juniors	2016	Primera B Nacional	16	0	0	0	—		—		0	0	16	0
Chacarita Juniors	2016–17	Primera B Nacional	21	1	1	0	—		—		0	0	22	1
Chacarita Juniors	2017–18	Primera División	7	0	0	0	—		—		0	0	7	0
Chacarita Juniors	2018–19	Primera B Nacional	12	3	0	0	—		—		0	0	12	3
Chacarita Juniors	2019–20	Primera B Nacional	17	3	0	0	—		—		0	0	17	3
Career total			73	7	1	0	—		—		0	0	74	7
