= Sebastián Cuerdo =

Argentine footballer

Personal information
- Full name: Sebastián Leonel Cuerdo
- Date of birth: 19 October 1986 (age 40)
- Place of birth: Sumampa, Argentina
- Height: 1.89 m (6 ft 2 in)
- Position: Goalkeeper

Youth career
- Racing de Cordoba

Senior career*
Years	Team	Apps	(Gls)
2005–2006	Racing de Cordoba	14	(0)
2006–2007	River Plate	0	(0)
2007–2008	Arsenal de Sarandí	0	(0)
2009–2010	San Martín Tucuman	12	(0)
2011	Sport Huancayo	19	(0)
2012	León de Huánuco	6	(0)
2013–2014	Cobresal	90	(0)
2015	→ Ind. Rivadavia (loan)		
2017–2018	Sportivo Estudiantes	2	(0)
2019–2020	Chacarita Juniors	3	(0)
2020–2021	Deportes Iquique	4	(0)
- * Club domestic league appearances and goals as of 19:09, 10 July 2022 (UTC)

Sebastián Leonel Cuerdo (born 16 July 1986) is an Argentine footballer who plays as a goalkeeper.

== Honours ==
=== Club ===
Arsenal de Sarandí

- Copa Sudamericana (1): 2007

Cobresal

- Primera División de Chile (1): 2015 Clausura
