= Juan Vera =

Paraguayan footballer (born 1999)

Personal information
- Full name: Juan Ángel Vera Gómez
- Date of birth: 5 February 1999 (age 27)
- Place of birth: Paraguay
- Position: Defender

Team information
- Current team: Olimpia
- Number: 22

Youth career
- 2018: Chacarita Juniors

Senior career*
Years	Team	Apps	(Gls)
2018–2020	Chacarita Juniors	4	(0)
2020–2021	Sportivo Luqueño	2	(0)
2022	Veraguas CD	12	(1)
2023–	Sportivo Trinidense	70	(4)
- * Club domestic league appearances and goals as of 13 August 2025

Juan Ángel Vera Gómez (born 5 February 1999) is a Paraguayan professional footballer who plays as a Defender for Olimpia.

== Career ==
Vera began his senior career in Argentina with Chacarita Juniors, joining the club in 2018. Jorge Vivaldo promoted the midfielder into their first-team squad in the 2018–19 Primera B Nacional campaign, selecting him on the substitutes bench three times for matches with Gimnasia y Esgrima, Temperley and Mitre. However, it was Patricio Pisano - Vivaldo's replacement in January 2019 - who picked Vera for his professional debut on 2 February during a fixture with Deportivo Morón; he played the full duration of a goalless draw.

== Career statistics ==
As of 3 February 2019.

Club statistics
Club	Season	League			Cup		Continental		Other		Total	
Club	Season	Division	Apps	Goals	Apps	Goals	Apps	Goals	Apps	Goals	Apps	Goals
Chacarita Juniors	2018–19	Primera B Nacional	1	0	0	0	—		0	0	1	0
Career total			1	0	0	0	—		0	0	1	0
