= Salvador Sánchez (footballer) =

Argentine footballer (born 1995)

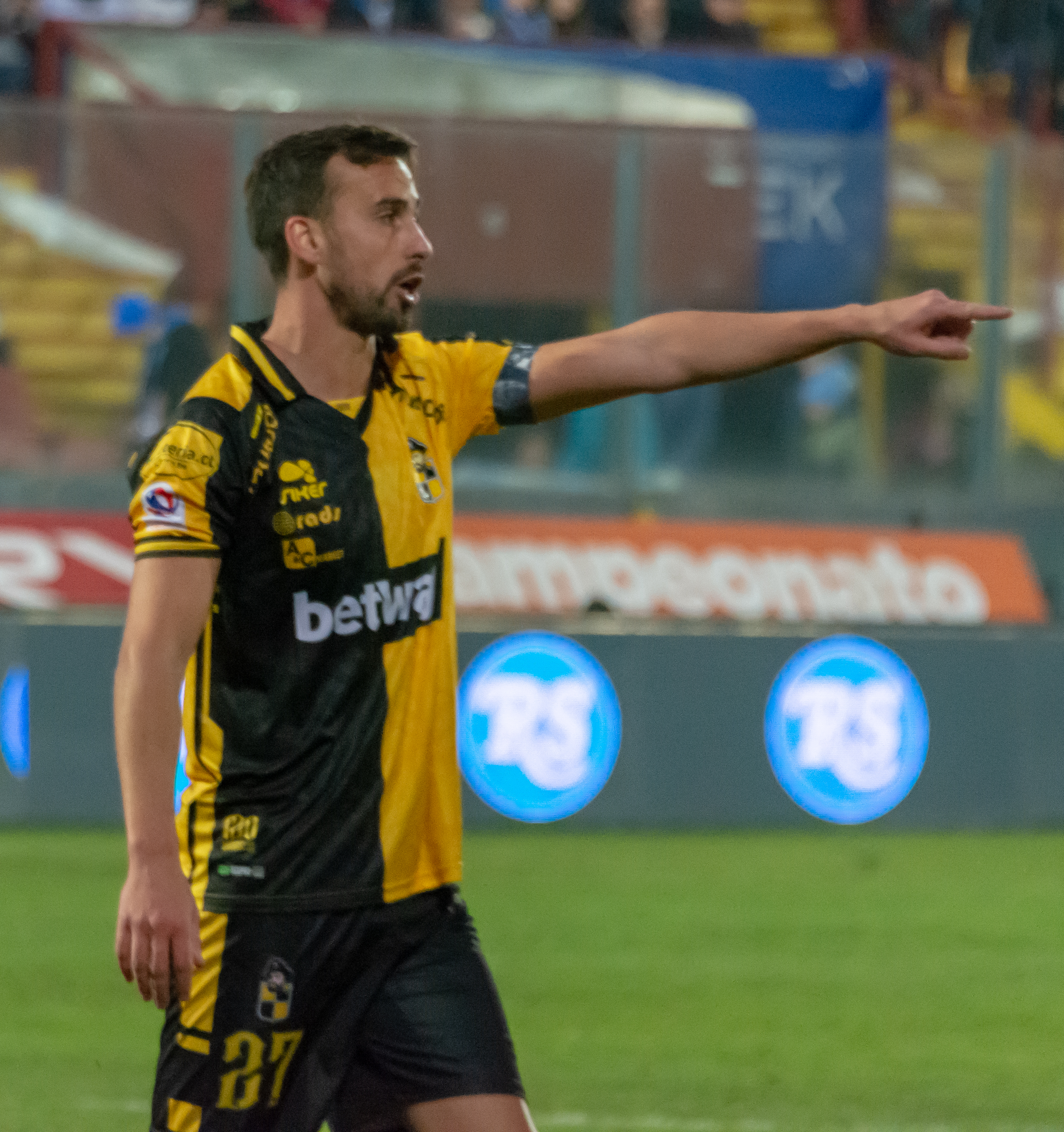
- Sánchez with Coquimbo Unido in 2023

Personal information
- Full name: Salvador Sánchez Salinas
- Date of birth: 31 July 1995 (age 31)
- Place of birth: Tres Algarrobos, Argentina
- Height: 1.86 m (6 ft 1 in)
- Position: Centre back

Team information
- Current team: Deportes Copiapó

Youth career
- 2008–2010: Tres Algarrobos
- 2010–2015: River Plate

Senior career*
Years	Team	Apps	(Gls)
2015–2017	Arsenal de Sarandí	5	(0)
2017–2018	Santamarina	19	(0)
2018–2019	Olimpo	18	(1)
2019–2020	Chacarita Juniors	3	(0)
2020–2021	Volos	26	(1)
2021–2022	Ionikos	29	(1)
2022	FK Panevėžys	9	(0)
2023–2024	Coquimbo Unido	40	(3)
2025	Lamia	6	(0)
2025	Deportes Iquique	15	(0)
2026	Dinamo Samarqand	1	(0)
2026–	Deportes Copiapó	0	(0)
- * Club domestic league appearances and goals as of 5 May 2026

Salvador Sánchez Salinas (born 31 July 1995) is an Argentine professional footballer who plays as a centre back for Chilean club Deportes Copiapó.

== Career ==
Sánchez's youth career began with Tres Algarrobos in 2008, he remained there for two years before joining River Plate's youth ranks. Five years later, he left to join Argentine Primera División club Arsenal de Sarandí. His first mark on Arsenal's first-team came during the 2015 Copa Sudamericana when he was on the bench twice for a tie against Independiente. He made his professional football debut on 20 September 2015 in a league win against Olimpo, he made a further two appearances in the 2015 campaign. Sanchez joined Primera B Nacional side Santamarina in September 2017 following a trial period during pre-season.

His Santamarina debut came on 16 September versus Aldosivi. Eighteen further appearances followed, prior to a move to fellow Primera B Nacional outfit Olimpo on 4 July 2018.

In 2023, Sánchez joined Coquimbo Unido in the Chilean Primera División. He left them at the end of the 2024 season.

After a stint with Greek club Lamia, Sánchez returned to Chile and signed with Deportes Iquique on 2 July 2025.

On 19 February 2026, Sánchez signed with Uzbek club Dinamo Samarqand. In June of the same year, he moved back to Chile and joined Deportes Copiapó.

== Career statistics ==
As of 5 September 2018.

Club statistics
Club	Season	League			Cup (Note: Includes the Copa Argentina)		League Cup		Continental (Note: Includes the Copa Sudamericana)		Other		Total	
Club	Season	Division	Apps	Goals	Apps	Goals	Apps	Goals	Apps	Goals	Apps	Goals	Apps	Goals
Arsenal de Sarandí	2015	Primera División	3	0	0	0	—		0	0	0	0	3	0
Arsenal de Sarandí	2016	Primera División	0	0	0	0	—		—		0	0	0	0
Arsenal de Sarandí	2016–17	Primera División	2	0	0	0	—		0	0	0	0	2	0
Arsenal de Sarandí	Total		5	0	0	0	—		0	0	0	0	5	0
Santamarina	2017–18	Primera B Nacional	19	0	0	0	—		—		0	0	19	0
Olimpo	2018–19	Primera B Nacional	1	0	0	0	—		—		0	0	1	0
Career total			25	0	0	0	—		0	0	0	0	25	0
