= Gabriel Lazarte =

Argentine footballer

Personal information
- Full name: Gabriel Lazarte
- Date of birth: 7 November 1997 (age 29)
- Place of birth: Buenos Aires, Argentina
- Height: 1.70 m (5 ft 7 in)
- Position: Left-back

Team information
- Current team: Güemes

Youth career
- Chacarita Juniors

Senior career*
Years	Team	Apps	(Gls)
2016–2020	Chacarita Juniors	72	(0)
2020–2021	Agropecuario	30	(1)
2022–	Güemes	16	(0)
- * Club domestic league appearances and goals as of 19:21, 10 July 2022 (UTC)

Gabriel Lazarte (born 7 November 1997) is an Argentine professional footballer who plays as a left-back for Primera Nacional side Club Atlético Güemes.

== Career ==
Lazarte began his senior career in 2016 with Chacarita Juniors, then of Primera B Nacional. He made his professional debut on 21 February in a 3–0 defeat to Guillermo Brown, he was subbed on for the final nine minutes in place of Federico Rosso. He played one more time in 2016, before featuring twenty-eight times in 2016–17 as Chacarita finished second which secured promotion to the Argentine Primera División. During that season, Lazarte signed a new contract with the club. His first appearance in the Primera División was in a 1–1 draw with Tigre in September 2017.

On 15 October 2020, after leaving Chacarita as his contract expired, Lazarte signed with Club Agropecuario Argentino. Ahead of the 2022 season, Lazarte moved to fellow league club Club Atlético Güemes.

== Career statistics ==
As of 11 May 2018.

Club statistics
Club	Season	League			Cup (Note: Includes the Copa Argentina)		League Cup		Continental		Other		Total	
Club	Season	Division	Apps	Goals	Apps	Goals	Apps	Goals	Apps	Goals	Apps	Goals	Apps	Goals
Chacarita Juniors	2016	Primera B Nacional	2	0	0	0	—		—		0	0	2	0
Chacarita Juniors	2016–17	Primera B Nacional	28	0	0	0	—		—		0	0	28	0
Chacarita Juniors	2017–18	Primera División	20	0	0	0	—		—		0	0	20	0
Career total			50	0	0	0	—		—		0	0	50	0
