= Nehuen Montoya =

Argentine footballer

Personal information
- Date of birth: 11 February 1998 (age 28)
- Place of birth: Argentina
- Position: Defender

Team information
- Current team: JJ Urquiza

Youth career
- Chacarita Juniors

Senior career*
Years	Team	Apps	(Gls)
2019–2024	Chacarita Juniors	3	(0)
2019–2021	→ Tristán Suárez (loan)	22	(0)
2022–2023	→ JJ Urquiza (loan)	9	(0)
2024–	JJ Urquiza		
2025	→ Deportivo Riestra (loan)	0	(0)
- * Club domestic league appearances and goals as of 17:51, 13 March 2026 (UTC)

Nehuen Montoya (born 11 February 1998) is an Argentine professional footballer who plays as a defender for JJ Urquiza.

== Career ==
Montoya got his career underway with Chacarita Juniors in Primera B Nacional. A fixture at the Estadio Chacarita Juniors with Sarmiento on 23 February 2019 allowed Montoya to make his debut in professional football, playing the full duration of a 1–3 loss; he had previously been an unused substitute three times that month.

== Career statistics ==
As of 3 March 2019.

Appearances and goals by club, season and competition
Club	Season	League			Cup		Continental		Other		Total	
Club	Season	Division	Apps	Goals	Apps	Goals	Apps	Goals	Apps	Goals	Apps	Goals
Chacarita Juniors	2018–19	Primera B Nacional	2	0	—		—		0	0	2	0
Career total			2	0	—		—		0	0	2	0
