= Elías Alderete =

Argentine footballer

Personal information
- Full name: Elías Patricio Alderete
- Date of birth: 30 July 1995 (age 31)
- Place of birth: San Miguel, Argentina
- Height: 1.75 m (5 ft 9 in)
- Position: Forward

Team information
- Current team: San Lorenzo
- Number: 34

Youth career
- –2016: Chacarita Juniors

Senior career*
Years	Team	Apps	(Gls)
2013–2023	Chacarita Juniors	77	(12)
2020	→ Arema (loan)	2	(1)
2021	→ Club Aurora (loan)	26	(10)
2022	→ Estudiantes BA (loan)	21	(5)
2023	→ Almagro (loan)	17	(4)
2024	Estudiantes de Merida	25	(11)
2025	Monagas	7	(0)
2025–2026	Estudiantes de Merida	12	(0)
2026–	San Lorenzo	1	(0)
- * Club domestic league appearances and goals as of 15 March 2026

Elías Patricio Alderete (born 30 July 1995) is an Argentine professional footballer. He currently plays as a forward for Paraguayan Primera División club San Lorenzo.

== Career ==
Alderete started his career in 2014 with Chacarita Juniors of Primera B Metropolitana. He played three times during 2013–14, including his professional debut on 16 April in a 1–0 win over Colegiales. Just seven more appearances followed in the next three seasons in Primera B Metropolitana and Primera B Nacional, but he did play twenty-eight times during the 2016–17 Primera B Nacional season which ended with promotion to the top-flight of Argentine football. He also scored five goals during 2016–17, with his career first coming against Flandria in December 2016.

In January 2020, Alderete was loaned by Chacarita to Indonesian Liga 1 side Arema for one year. He scored a penalty on debut in March during a defeat to Persib Bandung.

== Career statistics ==
As of 16 October 2023

Club statistics
Club	Season	League			Cup		League Cup		Continental		Other		Total	
Club	Season	Division	Apps	Goals	Apps	Goals	Apps	Goals	Apps	Goals	Apps	Goals	Apps	Goals
Chacarita Juniors	2013–14	Primera B Metropolitana	3	0	0	0	—		—		0	0	3	0
Chacarita Juniors	2014	Primera B Metropolitana	0	0	0	0	—		—		0	0	0	0
Chacarita Juniors	2015	Primera B Nacional	6	0	1	0	—		—		0	0	7	0
Chacarita Juniors	2016	Primera B Nacional	1	0	0	0	—		—		0	0	1	0
Chacarita Juniors	2016–17	Primera B Nacional	28	5	0	0	—		—		0	0	28	5
Chacarita Juniors	2017–18	Primera División	11	3	1	0	—		—		0	0	12	3
Chacarita Juniors	2018–19	Primera B Nacional	17	3	0	0	—		—		0	0	17	3
Chacarita Juniors	2019–20	Primera B Nacional	8	1	0	0	—		—		0	0	8	1
Chacarita Juniors	2020	Primera B Nacional	0	0	0	0	—		—		0	0	0	0
Chacarita Juniors	2023	Primera B Nacional	3	0	0	0	—		—		0	0	3	0
Chacarita Juniors	Total		77	12	2	0	—		—		0	0	78	12
Arema (loan)	2020	Liga 1	2	1	0	0	—		—		0	0	2	1
Club Aurora (loan)	2021	División Profesional	26	10	0	0	—		—		0	0	26	10
Estudiantes BA (loan)	2022	Primera B Nacional	21	5	0	0	—		—		0	0	21	5
Almagro (loan)	2023	Primera B Nacional	16	3	2	1	—		—		0	0	18	4
Career total			142	31	4	1	—		—		0	0	145	32
