= Facundo Tallarico =

Argentine footballer

Personal information
- Full name: Facundo Nahuel Tallarico
- Date of birth: 21 October 1999 (age 27)
- Place of birth: Argentina
- Height: 1.85 m (6 ft 1 in)
- Position: Centre-back

Team information
- Current team: Fénix de Pilar (on loan from Chacarita Juniors)

Youth career
- Chacarita Juniors

Senior career*
Years	Team	Apps	(Gls)
2019–	Chacarita Juniors	15	(0)
2022–	→ Fénix de Pilar (loan)	4	(0)
- * Club domestic league appearances and goals as of 19:38, 10 July 2022 (UTC)

Facundo Nahuel Tallarico (born 21 October 1999) is an Argentine professional footballer who plays as a centre-back for Fénix de Pilar, on loan from Chacarita Juniors.

== Career ==
Tallarico began his career with Chacarita Juniors in Primera B Nacional. The 2018–19 season saw Tallarico make the move into their senior squad, appearing on the substitutes bench for a draw away to Nueva Chicago on 17 March 2019; though he wasn't substituted on by manager Patricio Pisano. His debut did, however, arrive a week later on 23 March as he played the full duration of a home match versus Guillermo Brown. In January 2022, Tallarico joined Fénix de Pilar on a one-year loan deal.

== Career statistics ==
As of 24 March 2019.

Appearances and goals by club, season and competition
Club	Season	League			Cup		Continental		Other		Total	
Club	Season	Division	Apps	Goals	Apps	Goals	Apps	Goals	Apps	Goals	Apps	Goals
Chacarita Juniors	2018–19	Primera B Nacional	1	0	0	0	—		0	0	1	0
Career total			1	0	0	0	—		0	0	1	0
