= Facundo Pansardi =

Argentine footballer (born 1989)

Personal information
- Full name: Facundo Nahuel Pansardi
- Date of birth: 16 February 1989 (age 37)
- Place of birth: San Martín, Buenos Aires, Argentina
- Height: 1.76 m (5 ft 9 in)
- Position: Midfielder

Team information
- Current team: Sportivo Italiano

Senior career*
Years	Team	Apps	(Gls)
2007	JJ Urquiza	11	(0)
2008–2012	Estudiantes BA	152	(6)
2012–2013	Temperley	39	(4)
2013–2014	Platense	48	(3)
2015	Nueva Chicago	1	(0)
2015	Cobreloa	17	(2)
2016–2017	Estudiantes BA	25	(1)
2018	Sarmiento de Resistencia	4	(0)
2018–2020	Fénix	54	(3)
2021–	Sportivo Italiano	137	(10)
- * Club domestic league appearances and goals as of 9 July 2024

Facundo Nahuel Pansardi (born 16 February 1989) is an Argentine footballer who plays as a midfielder for Sportivo Italiano.

== Teams ==
- (Argentina) Estudiantes de Buenos Aires 2008–2012
- (Argentina) Temperley 2012–2013
- (Argentina) Platense 2013–2014
- (Argentina) Nueva Chicago 2015
- (Chile) Cobreloa 2015
