= Germán Yacaruso =

Argentine footballer (born 1993)

Personal information
- Date of birth: 6 January 1993 (age 33)
- Place of birth: Buenos Aires, Argentina
- Height: 1.90 m (6 ft 3 in)
- Position: Goalkeeper

Team information
- Current team: san Telmo

Youth career
- Vélez Sarsfield

Senior career*
| Years | Team | Apps | (Gls) |
| 2015–2019 | Comunicaciones | 71 | (0) |
| 2019–2020 | Platense | 9 | (0) |
| 2020– | Flandria | 2 | (0) |
- * Club domestic league appearances and goals as of 20:17, 18 July 2022 (UTC)

Germán Yacaruso (born 6 January 1993) is an Argentine professional footballer who plays as a goalkeeper for Flandria.

== Career ==
Yacaruso's senior career started in Primera B Metropolitana with Comunicaciones; after he joined the club from Vélez Sarsfield's youth ranks. His opening experience of first-team football was as an unused substitute for a Copa Argentina encounter with Atlanta in August 2015. He made his professional debut in September 2016, appearing for the full duration of a league draw with Deportivo Morón. Yacaruso made eighteen appearances in the 2016–17 Primera B Metropolitana, prior to participating in every minute of the club's subsequent 2017–18 campaign.

In July 2019, Yacaruso switched Argentina for Honduras after joining Platense. He made his debut on 12 August in a 3–0 victory over Vida, which was one of nine appearances the goalkeeper made for the Liga Nacional club. In August 2020, Yacaruso returned to his homeland with Flandria.

== Career statistics ==
As of 31 August 2020.

Appearances and goals by club, season and competition
| Club | Season | League | | | Cup | | League Cup | | Continental | | Other | | Total | |
| Club | Season | Division | Apps | Goals | Apps | Goals | Apps | Goals | Apps | Goals | Apps | Goals | Apps | Goals |
|---|---|---|---|---|---|---|---|---|---|---|---|---|---|---|
| Comunicaciones | 2015 | Primera B Metropolitana | 0 | 0 | 0 | 0 | — | | — | | 0 | 0 | 0 | 0 |
| Comunicaciones | 2016 | Primera B Metropolitana | 0 | 0 | 0 | 0 | — | | — | | 0 | 0 | 0 | 0 |
| Comunicaciones | 2016–17 | Primera B Metropolitana | 13 | 0 | 0 | 0 | — | | — | | 5 (Note: Appearance(s) in the Primera B Metropolitana play-offs) | 0 | 18 | 0 |
| Comunicaciones | 2017–18 | Primera B Metropolitana | 34 | 0 | 0 | 0 | — | | — | | 0 | 0 | 34 | 0 |
| Comunicaciones | 2018–19 | Primera B Metropolitana | 24 | 0 | 0 | 0 | — | | — | | 0 | 0 | 24 | 0 |
| Comunicaciones | Total | | 71 | 0 | 0 | 0 | — | | — | | 5 | 0 | 76 | 0 |
| Platense | 2019–20 | Liga Nacional | 9 | 0 | 0 | 0 | — | | — | | 0 | 0 | 9 | 0 |
| Flandria | 2020–21 | Primera B Metropolitana | 0 | 0 | 0 | 0 | — | | — | | 0 | 0 | 0 | 0 |
| Career total | | | 80 | 0 | 0 | 0 | — | | — | | 5 | 0 | 85 | 0 |
