= Hernán Da Campo =

Argentine footballer

Personal information
- Full name: Hernán Nicolás Da Campo
- Date of birth: 6 August 1994 (age 32)
- Place of birth: Capitán Bermúdez, Argentina
- Height: 1.78 m (5 ft 10 in)
- Position: Right midfielder

Team information
- Current team: Sport Boys
- Number: 8

Youth career
- Rosario Central

Senior career*
Years	Team	Apps	(Gls)
2014–2019	Rosario Central	8	(0)
2016–2017	→ Quilmes (loan)	24	(3)
2018–2019	→ San Martín (loan)	8	(0)
2019–2020	Chacarita Juniors	13	(0)
2020–2021	Olympiacos Volos	0	(0)
2021	→ Apollon Larissa (loan)	17	(0)
2022–2023	Brown de Adrogué	33	(3)
2024	Temperley	0	(0)
2025–	Sport Boys	31	(3)
- * Club domestic league appearances and goals as of 30 December 2025

Hernán Nicolás Da Campo (born 6 August 1994) is an Argentine professional footballer who plays as a right midfielder for Sport Boys.

== Career ==
Rosario Central promoted Da Campo into their first-team squad in late-2014, awarding him a professional debut on 22 November for a 1–1 Argentine Primera División draw with Olimpo. He followed that up with four appearances in all competitions across his first three seasons, including his Copa Libertadores debut versus Palmeiras in March 2016. Four months later, Da Campo joined fellow Primera División team Quilmes on loan for 2016–17. Quilmes ended the league campaign with relegation, but Da Campo featured twenty-four times and scored three goals; the first coming against Boca Juniors at La Bombonera.

A loan move to San Martín was completed on 24 June 2018. Nine total appearances followed as they suffered relegation. Da Campo left Rosario permanently in July 2019 in order to sign for Chacarita Juniors of Primera B Nacional. He featured thirteen times in 2019–20, with his final match for the club occurring on 16 March 2020 against Almagro; in a campaign that was curtailed due to the COVID-19 pandemic. On 21 August 2020, Da Campo joined Football League Greece side Olympiacos Volos. On 3 February 2021, with the league still unable to start, Da Campo was loaned to Super League 2 with Apollon Larissa. He left Greece in July 2021.

Ahead of the 2022 season, Da Campo officially signed with Primera Nacional side Brown de Adrogué.

== Career statistics ==
As of 24 May 2025.

Club statistics
Club	Division	League			Cup		Continental		Total	
Club	Division	Season	Apps	Goals	Apps	Goals	Apps	Goals	Apps	Goals
Rosario Central	Primera División	2014	2	0	0	0	—		2	0
Rosario Central	Primera División	2015	1	0	0	0	—		1	0
Rosario Central	Primera División	2016	1	0	0	0	1	0	1	0
Rosario Central	Primera División	2017-18	4	0	0	0	1	0	5	0
Rosario Central	Total		8	0	0	0	2	0	10	0
Quilmes	Primera División	2016-17	24	3	2	0	—		26	3
San Martín	Primera División	2018-19	8	0	1	0	—		9	0
Chacarita Juniors	Primera B Nacional	2019-20	13	0	—		—		13	0
Olympiacos Volos	Football League	2020-21	0	0	—		—		0	0
Olympiacos Volos	Super League 2	2021-22	0	0	0	0	—		0	0
Olympiacos Volos	Total		0	0	0	0	—		0	0
Apollon Larissa	Super League 2	2020-21	17	0	—		—		17	0
Brown de Adrogué	Primera B Nacional	2022	22	2	—		—		22	2
Brown de Adrogué	Primera B Nacional	2023	30	1	—		—		30	1
Brown de Adrogué	Total		52	3	—		—		52	3
Temperley	Primera B Nacional	2024	34	0	3	0	—		37	0
Sport Boys	Liga 1	2025	11	2	—		—		11	2
Career total			167	8	6	0	2	0	175	8
