= Luciano Perdomo =

Argentine footballer

Personal information
- Full name: Luciano Gastón Perdomo
- Date of birth: 10 September 1996 (age 30)
- Place of birth: San Miguel del Monte, Argentina
- Height: 1.74 m (5 ft 9 in)
- Position: Midfielder

Team information
- Current team: Chacarita Juniors

Youth career
- Gimnasia La Plata

Senior career*
Years	Team	Apps	(Gls)
2015–2019	Gimnasia La Plata	32	(0)
2019	Aldosivi	0	(0)
2019–	Chacarita Juniors	127	(2)
- * Club domestic league appearances and goals as of 18:05, 1 April 2026 (UTC)

Luciano Gastón Perdomo (born 10 September 1996) is an Argentine footballer who plays for Chacarita Juniors as a midfielder.

== Career ==
In August 2017, Perdomo was tested positive for doping for a game in the previous season on 27 May 2017 against Colón. He was tested positive for cannabis and was suspended for one year on 27 December 2017.

On 29 January 2019, Perdomo joined Aldosivi on a contract until June 2020. Six months later, he joined Chacarita Juniors.
