= Alan Sombra =

Argentine professional footballer

Personal information
- Full name: Alan Gabriel Sombra
- Date of birth: 23 May 1994 (age 32)
- Place of birth: Gregorio de Laferrère, Argentina
- Position: Forward

Team information
- Current team: Patronato (on loan from Sacachispas)

Youth career
- Huracán

Senior career*
Years	Team	Apps	(Gls)
2016–2019	Deportivo Español	53	(5)
2019–2020	JJ Urquiza	7	(0)
2020–	Sacachispas	68	(10)
2023	→ Resistencia (loan)	17	(1)
2023–2024	→ Chaco For Ever (loan)	19	(3)
2024	→ Defensores Unidos (loan)	14	(1)
2025–	→ Patronato (loan)	6	(0)
- * Club domestic league appearances and goals as of 16:23, 23 June 2025 (UTC)

Alan Gabriel Sombra (born 23 May 1994) is an Argentine professional footballer who plays as a forward for Patronato, on loan from Sacachispas.

== Career ==
Sombra played in the youth set-up of Real Madrid up until 2016, with the forward terminating his contract in order to join Laliga side Deportivo Español. He made his professional bow on 13 September 2016 versus Estudiantes, though didn't appear again until the end of season play-offs as he featured in fixtures with Atlanta and Deportivo Riestra. All three of his appearances in 2016–17 were as a substitute, with his first start arriving in September 2017 against San Telmo. Sombra scored a total of five goals across his first three seasons, including three in 2018–19 as they were relegated to the fourth tier.

July 2019 saw Sombra join JJ Urquiza. He appeared seven times, just once as a starter, before departing in February 2020 to fellow tier three outfit Sacachispas. His debut came versus San Telmo on 9 March.

== Career statistics ==
As of 12 June 2022

Appearances and goals by club, season and competition
Club	Season	League			Cup		League Cup		Continental		Other		Total	
Club	Season	Division	Apps	Goals	Apps	Goals	Apps	Goals	Apps	Goals	Apps	Goals	Apps	Goals
Deportivo Español	2016–17	Primera B Metropolitana	1	0	0	0	—		—		2 (Note: Appearance(s) in the Primera B Metropolitana play-offs)	0	3	0
Deportivo Español	2017–18	Primera B Metropolitana	24	2	0	0	—		—		0	0	24	2
Deportivo Español	2018–19	Primera B Metropolitana	28	3	0	0	—		—		0	0	28	3
Deportivo Español	Total		53	5	0	0	—		—		2	0	55	5
JJ Urquiza	2019–20	Primera B Metropolitana	7	0	0	0	—		—		0	0	7	0
Sacachispas	2019–20	Primera B Metropolitana	2	0	0	0	—		—		0	0	2	0
Career total			110	14	1	0	—		—		7	1	116	15
