= Alan Ledesma (footballer) =

Argentine footballer

Personal information
- Full name: Alan Ezequiel Ledesma
- Date of birth: 15 May 1998 (age 28)
- Place of birth: Argentina
- Height: 1.90 m (6 ft 3 in)
- Position: Centre-back

Team information
- Current team: Sportivo Luqueño
- Number: 24

Youth career
- Chacarita Juniors

Senior career*
Years	Team	Apps	(Gls)
2019–2021	Chacarita Juniors	16	(0)
2022–	Sportivo Luqueño	20	(1)
- * Club domestic league appearances and goals as of 19:30, 10 July 2022 (UTC)

Alan Ezequiel Ledesma (born 15 May 1998) is an Argentine professional footballer who plays as a centre-back for Paraguayan club Sportivo Luqueño.

== Career ==
Ledesma began his senior footballing career in Primera B Nacional with Chacarita Juniors. He was moved into their first-team squad and given his professional debut on 10 March 2019, participating from the start of a home fixture against Ferro Carril Oeste. In April 2022, Ledesma signed for Paraguayan club Sportivo Luqueño.

== Career statistics ==
As of match played 10 March 2019

Appearances and goals by club, season and competition
Club	Season	League			Cup		Continental		Other		Total	
Club	Season	Division	Apps	Goals	Apps	Goals	Apps	Goals	Apps	Goals	Apps	Goals
Chacarita Juniors	2018–19	Primera B Nacional	1	0	0	0	—		0	0	1	0
Career total			1	0	0	0	—		0	0	1	0
