= Tomás Segovia (footballer) =

Argentine footballer (born 1999)

Personal information
- Full name: Tomás Segovia
- Date of birth: 8 February 1999 (age 27)
- Place of birth: San Bernardo, Argentina
- Height: 1.75 m (5 ft 9 in)
- Position: Forward

Team information
- Current team: Sansinena

Senior career*
Years	Team	Apps	(Gls)
2018	Chacarita Juniors	1	(0)
2019	Liniers	12	(3)
2019–	Sansinena	9	(1)
- * Club domestic league appearances and goals as of 00:56, 24 March 2020 (UTC)

Tomás Segovia (born 6 May 1995) is an Argentine professional footballer who plays as a forward for Sansinena.

== Career ==
Segovia began his career in Chacarita Juniors' ranks. He was moved into the team's senior squad midway through the 2017–18 Argentine Primera División campaign, making his professional debut on 27 April 2018 during a loss at home to Temperley. That was his sole appearance in 2017–18, though he was an unused substitute on two occasions, as Chacarita Juniors were relegated to Primera B Nacional.

== Career statistics ==
As of 9 December 2018.

Club statistics
Club	Season	League			Cup (Note: Includes the Copa Argentina)		League Cup		Continental		Other		Total	
Club	Season	Division	Apps	Goals	Apps	Goals	Apps	Goals	Apps	Goals	Apps	Goals	Apps	Goals
Chacarita Juniors	2017–18	Primera División	1	0	0	0	—		—		0	0	1	0
Chacarita Juniors	2018–19	Primera B Nacional	0	0	0	0	—		—		0	0	0	0
Career total			1	0	0	0	—		—		0	0	1	0
