= Nicolás Chávez =

Argentine footballer

Nicolás Gabriel Chávez
Personal information
- Date of birth: 1 July 2001 (age 25)
- Place of birth: Argentina
- Position: Midfielder

Team information
- Current team: Chacarita Juniors

Youth career
- –2019: Chacarita Juniors

Senior career*
Years	Team	Apps	(Gls)
2019–	Chacarita Juniors	45	(3)
- * Club domestic league appearances and goals as of 19:11, 10 July 2022 (UTC)

Nicolás Gabriel Chávez (born 1 July 2001) is an Argentine professional footballer who plays as a midfielder for Chacarita Juniors.

== Career ==
Chávez is a product of Chacarita Juniors' youth system. He, aged seventeen, made the breakthrough into senior football with them during the 2018–19 Primera B Nacional campaign under Patricio Pisano, who substituted the midfielder on during a home defeat to Sarmiento on 23 February 2019.

== Career statistics ==
As of 3 March 2019.

Appearances and goals by club, season and competition
Club	Season	League			Cup		Continental		Other		Total	
Club	Season	Division	Apps	Goals	Apps	Goals	Apps	Goals	Apps	Goals	Apps	Goals
Chacarita Juniors	2018–19	Primera B Nacional	2	0	—		—		0	0	2	0
Career total			2	0	—		—		0	0	2	0
