= Gonzalo Groba =

Argentine footballer

Personal information
- Full name: Gonzalo Groba
- Date of birth: 16 February 1996 (age 30)
- Place of birth: Buenos Aires, Argentina
- Height: 1.70 m (5 ft 7 in)
- Position: Midfielder

Team information
- Current team: Olimpo

Senior career*
Years	Team	Apps	(Gls)
2017–2023	Chacarita Juniors	44	(2)
2022	→ Deportivo Riestra (loan)	17	(0)
2023–2024	Villa Dálmine	18	(0)
2024	Comunicaciones	9	(0)
2024–2025	UAI Urquiza	16	(0)
2025–	Olimpo	30	(1)
- * Club domestic league appearances and goals as of 16:44, 14 April 2026 (UTC)

Gonzalo Groba (born 16 February 1996) is an Argentine professional footballer who plays as a midfielder for Olimpo.

== Career ==
Groba started out with Chacarita Juniors. He made his first appearances in professional football in December 2017, when the midfielder was selected off the substitutes bench in matches with Olimpo and Lanús as the club were eventually relegated from the Argentine Primera División. His first senior start came in Primera B Nacional against Almagro on 27 August 2018. In January 2022, Groba joined Deportivo Riestra on a one-year loan deal.

== Career statistics ==
As of 7 December 2018.

Club statistics
Club	Season	League			Cup (Note: Includes the Copa Argentina)		League Cup		Continental		Other		Total	
Club	Season	Division	Apps	Goals	Apps	Goals	Apps	Goals	Apps	Goals	Apps	Goals	Apps	Goals
Chacarita Juniors	2017–18	Primera División	2	0	0	0	—		—		0	0	2	0
Chacarita Juniors	2018–19	Primera B Nacional	2	0	0	0	—		—		0	0	2	0
Career total			4	0	0	0	—		—		0	0	4	0
