= Omar Pires =

Argentine professional footballer

Personal information
- Full name: Omar Nicolás Pires
- Date of birth: 2 December 2000 (age 25)
- Place of birth: Argentina
- Position: Midfielder

Youth career
- Almirante Brown

Senior career*
Years	Team	Apps	(Gls)
2018–2019	Almirante Brown	3	(0)
- * Club domestic league appearances and goals as of 02:35, 25 April 2019 (UTC)

Omar Nicolás Pires (born 2 December 2000) is an Argentine professional footballer who plays as a midfielder.

== Career ==
Pires' career got underway with Almirante Brown of Primera B Metropolitana. His debut arrived on 17 November 2018 at the age of seventeen, as he came off the substitutes bench in a 1–1 league draw away to Deportivo Riestra. Another appearance came later that month at home to Acassuso, who ran out three-goal winners at the Estadio Fragata Presidente Sarmiento.

== Personal life ==
Pires has a footballing sibling: Lucas. He also played professionally for Almirante Brown. They have two cousins, Gastón and Matías, who featured alongside them in the Almirante Brown youth ranks.

== Career statistics ==
As of 25 April 2019.

Appearances and goals by club, season and competition
Club	Season	League			Cup		League Cup		Continental		Other		Total	
Club	Season	Division	Apps	Goals	Apps	Goals	Apps	Goals	Apps	Goals	Apps	Goals	Apps	Goals
Almirante Brown	2018–19	Primera B Metropolitana	3	0	0	0	—		—		0	0	3	0
Career total			3	0	0	0	—		—		0	0	3	0
