= Joaquín Ibáñez (footballer, born 1995) =

Argentine footballer (born 1995)

Personal information
- Date of birth: 18 July 1995 (age 31)
- Place of birth: San Martín, Argentina
- Height: 1.66 m (5 ft 5 in)
- Position: Left midfielder

Team information
- Current team: Flandria

Youth career
- Chacarita Juniors

Senior career*
Years	Team	Apps	(Gls)
2015–2020	Chacarita Juniors	46	(1)
2020–	Flandria	57	(8)
- * Club domestic league appearances and goals as of 20:10, 10 July 2022 (UTC)

Joaquín Ibáñez (born 18 July 1995) is an Argentine professional footballer who plays as a left midfielder for Flandria.

== Career ==
Ibáñez's first professional club was Primera B Nacional side Chacarita Juniors, he played in their youth system prior to making his first-team debut in 2015. His bow for Chacarita came on 2 April 2015 in a 1–0 Copa Argentina win against Atlas. He signed a new contract in December 2015. It took two years for Ibáñez to make his league debut, it arrived in May 2017 versus All Boys. In that season, he went onto play seven times in total as Chacarita won promotion to the Argentine Primera División. His first top-flight appearance came on 10 September against Tigre. Ibáñez scored his first goal on 23 March 2019 versus Guillermo Brown.

In September 2020, Flandria of Primera B Metropolitana completed the signing of Ibáñez.

== Career statistics ==
As of 6 September 2020.

Appearances and goals by club, season and competition
Club	Season	League			National cup		League cup		Continental		Other		Total	
Club	Season	Division	Apps	Goals	Apps	Goals	Apps	Goals	Apps	Goals	Apps	Goals	Apps	Goals
Chacarita Juniors	2015	Primera B Nacional	0	0	1	0	—		—		0	0	1	0
Chacarita Juniors	2016	Primera B Nacional	0	0	0	0	—		—		0	0	0	0
Chacarita Juniors	2016–17	Primera B Nacional	7	0	1	0	—		—		0	0	8	0
Chacarita Juniors	2017–18	Primera División	18	0	0	0	—		—		0	0	18	0
Chacarita Juniors	2018–19	Primera B Nacional	10	1	0	0	—		—		0	0	10	1
Chacarita Juniors	2019–20	Primera B Nacional	11	0	0	0	—		—		0	0	11	0
Chacarita Juniors	Total		46	1	2	0	—		—		0	0	48	1
Flandria	2020–21	Primera B Metropolitana	0	0	0	0	—		—		0	0	0	0
Career total			46	1	2	0	—		—		0	0	48	1
