= CSD Flandria =

Argentine football club

Flandria
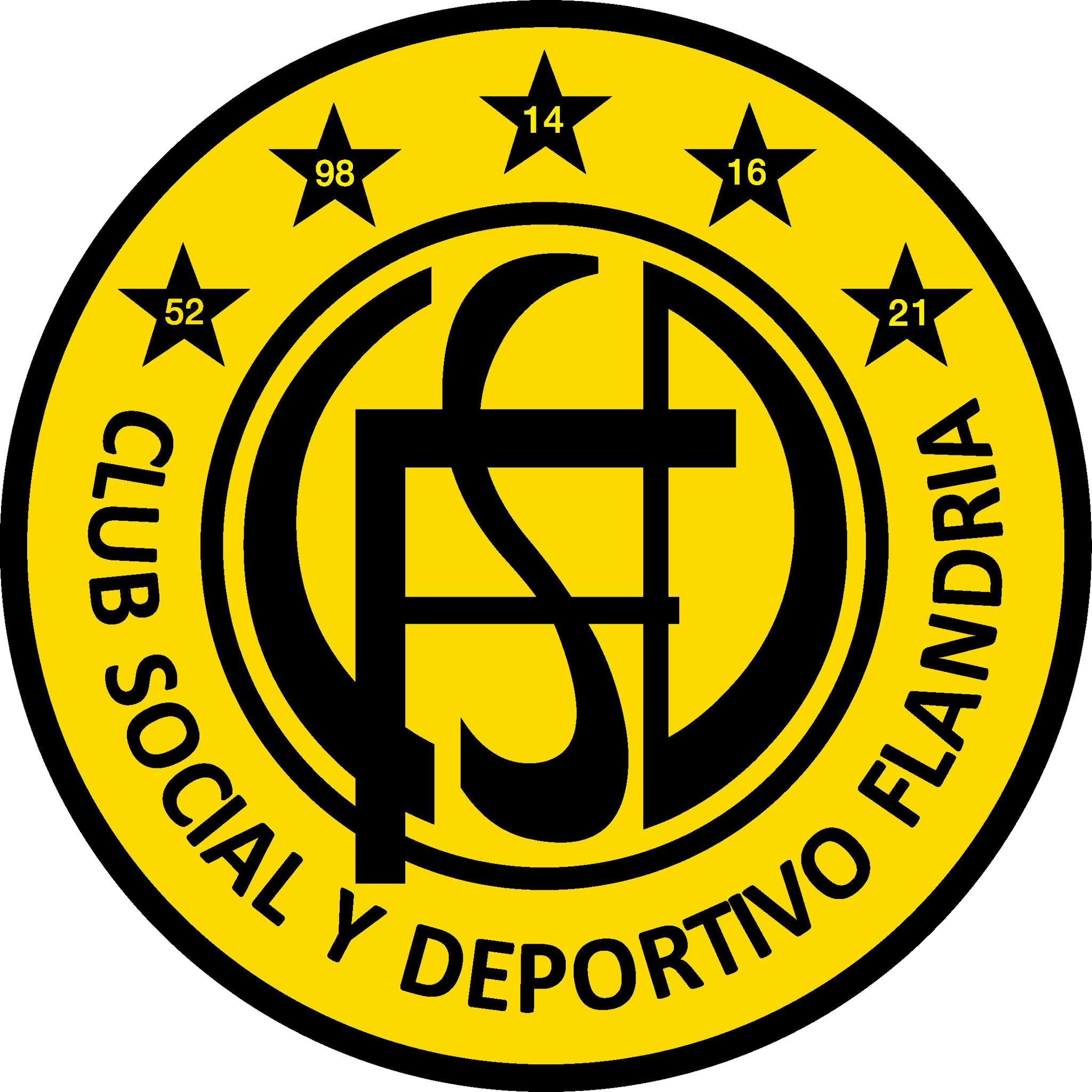
- Full name: Club Social y Deportivo Flandria
- Nickname: El Canario (The Canary)
- Founded: 9 February 1941; 85 years ago
- Ground: Estadio Carlos V, Jáuregui, Buenos Aires Province, Argentina
- Capacity: 5,000
- Chairman: Vanina Torres
- Manager: Arnaldo Sialle
- League: Primera B
- 2023: Primera Nacional Zone A, 19st (Relegated)
| Home colours | Away colours | Third colours |

Club Social y Deportivo Flandria is an Argentine football club based in the city of Jáuregui, Buenos Aires Province, which was founded by Julio Steverlynck. Although many sports are practised at the club, The Canary is best known for its professional football team. The squad currently plays in Primera B Metropolitana, the regionalised third division of the Argentine football league system.

== History ==
The club originated at the factory Algodonera Flandria (Cotton Flanders), located in Jauregui. In his factory, Don Julio Steverlynck created a lot of job opportunities for the European immigrants in the area. Those immigrants were the people that started to play football to spend their free time. They formed a team and played their first match against Jauregui Juniors.

In 1940, a sports camp was opened and this place was used as a ground field to practice. Months later, they founded a team called Flandria, and started to participate at the Lujanense Soccer League. In 1941, the club designed their first managing board, with Jose Delesie as president.

In 1947 Flandria was affiliated to AFA and started to play on "Tercera de Ascenso". Their first match ended with a comfortable victory 5–3 against Alumni de Villa Urquiza, and Titin Caricato became the first player that scored a goal for Flandria.

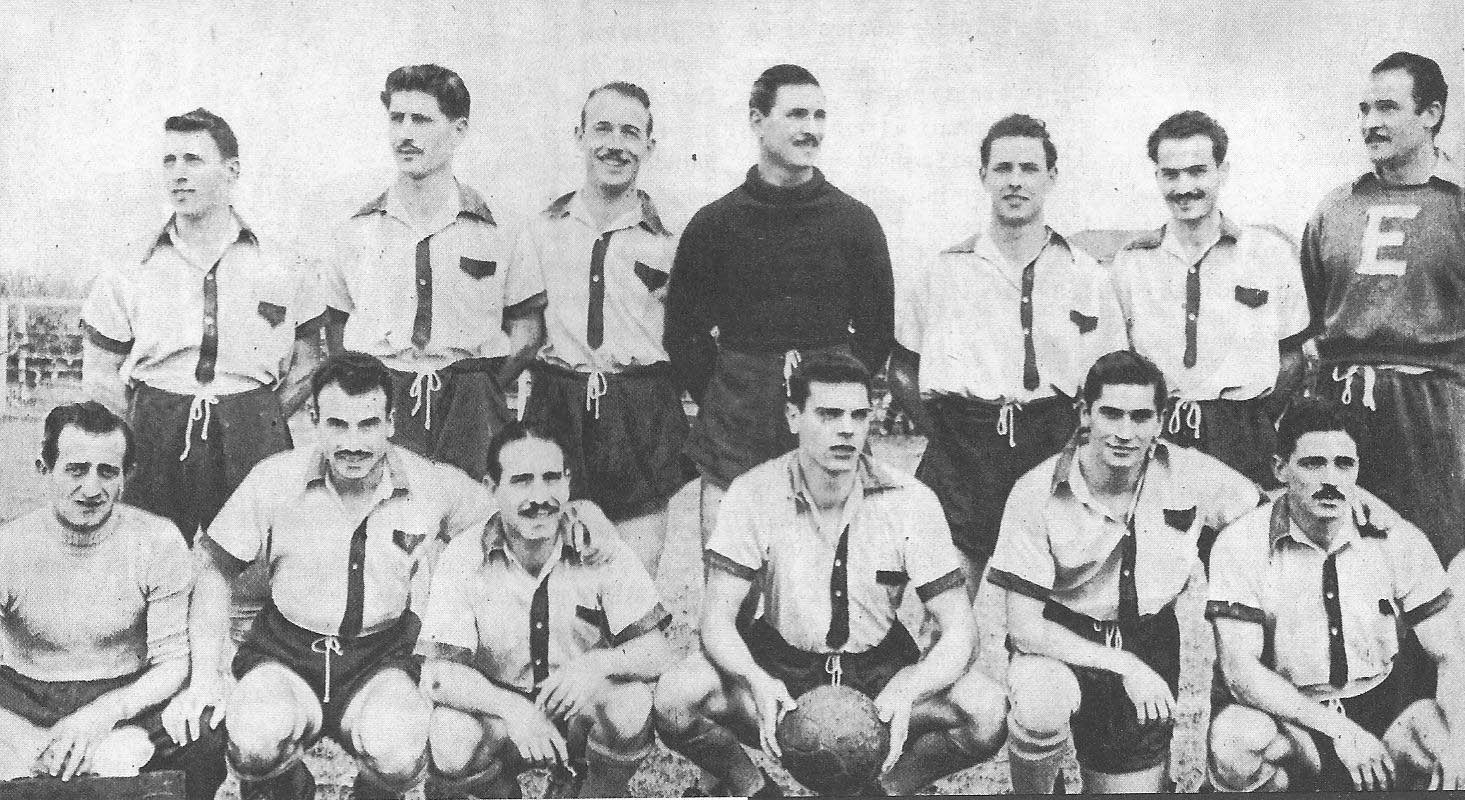
The 1952 Flandria squad, which won the championship promoting to Primera C

In 1952 the Canary became champion and obtains promotion to Primera C, where the team did excellent performances in 1953 y 1957, reaching the second place.

In 1960 Flandria inaugurated their own ground field, called Carlos V, which has a capacity of 5,000 spectators.

In 1970 Flandria became champion of the Primera C, by winning in a breakthrough against Sarmiento de Junín with 3–1. Two goals were scored by Nocella and one by Apariente.

In 1979 Flandria lost their place in Primera C, closing the most important chapter in their history.

In 1998, with Omar Santorelli as manager, Flandria returns to Primera B.

In 2014 Flandria, after a bad campaign, lost their place in Primera B.

They win the promotion to the second category of the Argentine football for the first time in history on 12 June 2016, after clinching the Primera B Metropolitana championship.

However, for the 2017-18 season the team is relegated again to Primera B .

== Current squad ==
As of 18 July 2022

Note: Flags indicate national team as defined under FIFA eligibility rules; some limited exceptions apply. Players may hold more than one non-FIFA nationality.

| No. | Pos. | Nation | Player |
|---|---|---|---|
| — | GK | ARG | Juan Lungarzo |
| — | GK | ARG | Germán Yacaruso |
| — | DF | ARG | Gino Barbieri (loan from Belgrano) |
| — | DF | ARG | Tomás Mantía |
| — | DF | ARG | Julián Marchio |
| — | DF | ARG | Adrián Torres |
| — | DF | ARG | Nicolás Henry |
| — | DF | ARG | Andrés Camacho |
| — | DF | ARG | Francisco Martínez |
| — | MF | ARG | Tomas Bottari (loan from Quilmes) |
| — | MF | ARG | Alejandro Altuna |
| — | MF | ARG | Joaquín Ibáñez |
| — | MF | ARG | Mariano Puch |

| No. | Pos. | Nation | Player |
|---|---|---|---|
| — | MF | ARG | Gastón Mansilla |
| — | MF | ARG | Enzo Trinidad |
| — | FW | ARG | Juan Álvarez |
| — | FW | ARG | Benjamín Borasi (loan from Sarmiento) |
| — | FW | ARG | Facundo Taborda |
| — | FW | ARG | Alejandro González |
| — | FW | ARG | Facundo Quintana |
| — | FW | ARG | Juan Barbieri |
| — | FW | ARG | Brian Ferreyra |
| — | FW | ARG | Franco Tissera |
| — | FW | ARG | Nicolás Toloza (loan from Estudiantes BA) |
| — | FW | ARG | Juan Rocca |

== Titles ==
- Primera B Metropolitana: 2016
- Primera C (1): 1997–98
- Primera D (1): 1952
