= Club Atlético Fénix =

Fénix
- Full name: Club Atlético Fénix
- Nicknames: Cuervos; Blanquinegro; Águila; Albinegro
- Founded: 25 April 1948; 78 years ago
- Ground: (none)
- Capacity: 10,000
- Chairman: Carlos Alberto Vazquez
- Manager: Juan Ignacio Arias Navarro
- League: Primera C
- 2025: Primera B, 21st of 21 (relegated)
- Website: clubfenix.com.ar
Home colours	Away colours

Club Atlético Fénix is an Argentine football club from Pilar, Buenos Aires Province. The team currently plays in the Primera B Metropolitana, the regionalised third division of the Argentine football league system. In 2013, Fénix won the playoff series after defeating Deportivo Español in the second game by 2–1. The first match finished 1–1 and thereby the squad was promoted to the upper division, Primera B Metropolitana.

== History ==
The club was established on 25 April 1948 by a group of boys met at the bar owned by Guillermo García in Palermo district of Buenos Aires. The boys played football competing in local leagues and decided to found their own club, named "Club Atlético, Social y Deportivo Fénix".

The name was chosen because the bar where the boys used to meet had been destroyed by fire in 1947. Despite the accident, the bar reopened soon later, being compared to the phoenix, "arising from the ashes of its predecessor". "Fénix" is the Spanish translation for "phoenix".

In 1955 the club rented a land in the Colegiales neighborhood, where Fénix built its first headquarters and venue. One year later the club changed its name to current "Club Atlético Fénix".

Fénix affiliated to the Argentine Football Association in 1959 and began to play the Torneo de Aficionados (current Primera D). In 1963 the team promoted by the first time, and built its current headquarters in the Concepción Arenal street of Chacarita neighborhood. In 1965 Fénix was near to promote to Primera B Metropolitana but lost the playoff to Almirante Brown by 1–0.

In 1978 the Intendant of Buenos Aires, Osvaldo Cacciatore notified the club that it had to vacate the lands where the stadium had been erected, so Fénix had to play its home games in different venues, most frequently Excursionistas stadium. The team was also relegated to Primera D that same year.

After being disaffiliated a couple of times and a financial crisis, the club signed an agreement with private investors which took over the manage of the institution for 10 years. As a result, Fénix left the neighborhood of Colegiales (where its headquarters still remain) moving to Pilar Partido in Buenos Aires Province. In 2010 the investor left the club claiming that "the objectives had not been accomplished".

At the end of 2010–11 season Fénix was relegated to Primera D although the team returned to Primera C in the 2011–12 season after winning the championship.

== Honours ==
- Primera D (2): 2004–05, 2011–12
