= 2016–17 Primera B Nacional =

32nd season of the second-tier football league in Argentina

Primera B Nacional
- Season: 2016–17
- Champions: Argentinos Juniors
- Promoted: Argentinos Juniors; Chacarita Juniors
- Relegated: Atlético Paraná; Central Córdoba (SdE); Crucero del Norte; Douglas Haig
- Matches: 506
- Goals: 1,082 (2.14 per match)
- Biggest home win: Villa Dálmine 5-0 Juventud Unida (G) (August 30)
- Biggest away win: Los Andes 0-4 Juventud Unida (G) (November 13)
- Highest scoring: Ferro Carril Oeste 4-3 Central Córdoba (SdE) (August 27); Instituto 5-2 Brown (October 9)
- All statistics correct as of 30 July 2017.

The 2016–17 Argentine Primera B Nacional was the 32nd season of the Argentine second division. The season began in August 2016 and ended in July 2017. Twenty-three teams competed in the league, twenty returning from the 2016 season, one team that was relegated from Primera División and two teams promoted from Federal A and B Metropolitana.

== Competition format ==
The league's format changed from the previous season. Twenty-three teams which played each other twice for a total of forty-four matches each. The Champion and the runner-up earned promotion to the Primera División. Four teams were relegated at the end of the season.

== Club information ==
Locations of the 2016–17 season teams.
Locations of the 2016–17 Primera B Nacional teams within Greater Buenos Aires.

Club	City	Stadium
All Boys	Buenos Aires	Islas Malvinas
Almagro	José Ingenieros	Tres de Febrero
Argentinos Juniors	Buenos Aires	Diego Armando Maradona
Atlético Paraná	Paraná	Pedro Mutio
Boca Unidos	Corrientes	Leoncio Benítez
Brown	Adrogué	Lorenzo Arandilla
Central Córdoba	Santiago del Estero	Alfredo Terrera
Chacarita Juniors	Villa Maipú	Chacarita Juniors Stadium
Crucero del Norte	Garupá	Comandante Andrés Guacurarí
Douglas Haig	Pergamino	Miguel Morales
Estudiantes	San Luis	Héctor Odicino-Pedro Benoza
Ferro Carril Oeste	Buenos Aires	Arquitecto Ricardo Etcheverry
Flandria	Jáuregui	Carlos V
Gimnasia y Esgrima	Jujuy	23 de Agosto
Guillermo Brown	Puerto Madryn	Raúl Conti
Independiente Rivadavia	Mendoza	Bautista Gargantini
Instituto	Córdoba	Presidente Perón
Juventud Unida	Gualeguaychú	Estadio Luis Delfino
Los Andes	Lomas de Zamora	Estadio Eduardo Gallardón
Nueva Chicago	Mataderos	Nueva Chicago
San Martín	San Miguel de Tucumán	La Ciudadela
Santamarina	Tandil	Municipal Gral. San Martín
Villa Dálmine	Campana	Villa Dálmine

== League table ==
Pos	Team	Pld	W	D	L	GF	GA	GD	Pts	Promotion or Qualification
1	Argentinos Juniors (C, P)	44	25	13	6	61	24	+37	88	Champion, Promotion to Primera División
2	Chacarita Juniors (P)	44	22	11	11	57	40	+17	77	Promotion to Primera División
3	Guillermo Brown	44	20	15	9	53	30	+23	75	
4	Independiente Rivadavia	44	16	19	9	48	44	+4	67	
5	Brown	44	18	11	15	57	50	+7	65	
6	Instituto	44	17	12	15	58	51	+7	63	
7	San Martín (T)	44	16	13	15	62	54	+8	61	
8	Santamarina	44	15	16	13	45	43	+2	61	
9	Ferro Carril Oeste	44	13	21	10	51	44	+7	60	
10	Nueva Chicago	44	16	12	16	53	47	+6	60	
11	Almagro	44	14	18	12	35	34	+1	60	
12	All Boys (Note: All Boys were penalized two points.)	44	17	11	16	43	45	−2	60	
13	Los Andes	44	14	17	13	47	50	−3	59	
14	Central Córdoba (SdE)	44	14	16	14	57	49	+8	58	
15	Flandria	44	13	17	14	39	40	−1	56	
16	Juventud Unida (G)	44	14	13	17	50	66	−16	55	
17	Estudiantes (SL)	44	14	12	18	40	58	−18	54	
18	Gimnasia y Esgrima (J)	44	12	16	16	36	45	−9	52	
19	Douglas Haig	44	11	17	16	36	49	−13	50	
20	Boca Unidos	44	11	14	19	42	54	−12	47	
21	Villa Dálmine	44	12	11	21	45	60	−15	47	
22	Atlético Paraná	44	9	12	23	34	58	−24	39	
23	Crucero del Norte	44	8	13	23	36	50	−14	37	

Source: AFA
Rules for classification: 1) points; 2) play-off (only for deciding promotion or relegation); 3) goal difference; 4) goals scored; 5) head-to-head points; 6) head-to-head goal difference; 7) head-to-head goals scored.
(C) Champions; (P) Promoted

== Results ==
Home \ Away	ALL	ALM	ARG	APA	BOU	BRO	CCO	CHA	CRU	DOU	ESL	FCO	FLA	GEJ	GBR	IND	INS	JUG	LAN	NCH	SMT	SAN	VDA
All Boys		1–1	0–3	0–0	0–1	1–0	2–1	1–0	3–2	1–1	4–0	1–0	0–0	2–1	0–2	2–2	2–0	3–1	0–1	2–0	0–2	0–2	0–1
Almagro	1–0		0–0	0–1	0–0	2–0	0–0	3–0	0–0	2–2	2–1	0–1	1–1	1–1	1–0	0–0	2–0	1–1	0–0	1–0	0–3	2–1	1–2
Argentinos Juniors	5–1	0–0		1–0	3–0	0–0	0–0	1–0	1–0	1–1	4–1	3–1	2–0	1–0	0–2	3–1	1–0	4–0	1–1	2–0	3–1	1–0	2–0
Atlético Paraná	0–1	4–3	0–1		0–3	0–3	1–1	1–1	0–0	1–0	1–3	0–0	0–2	0–1	0–2	1–1	1–0	0–0	2–0	1–1	0–1	0–0	1–0
Boca Unidos	0–1	1–2	1–0	3–0		0–2	2–0	1–0	2–1	3–1	0–1	1–3	2–2	1–1	0–3	1–1	0–1	1–3	1–0	0–2	1–1	0–2	2–1
Brown	1–4	2–0	1–0	3–2	1–1		0–1	1–2	2–0	0–1	0–1	5–1	1–1	0–0	1–1	1–0	2–0	1–1	1–1	1–2	2–2	2–0	2–1
Central Cba. (SdE)	2–0	1–1	0–1	1–2	1–1	0–1		0–2	3–0	2–3	0–1	4–1	1–1	2–2	2–1	3–0	0–0	1–0	1–0	3–1	0–0	3–0	3–1
Chacarita Juniors	1–0	3–0	1–1	0–2	1–0	1–2	4–0		1–0	1–0	2–0	1–0	3–2	0–0	0–2	1–0	1–1	2–1	1–1	2–3	1–0	3–0	4–1
Crucero del Norte	0–0	2–0	1–1	0–2	2–3	1–1	0–0	2–0		1–0	3–0	1–1	2–0	0–3	4–0	1–1	1–2	0–1	2–1	2–2	3–0	0–1	1–2
Douglas Haig	0–0	0–0	0–1	1–0	1–0	1–2	2–0	0–0	1–0		2–2	1–1	2–3	1–0	0–2	1–0	1–1	0–1	0–1	0–0	2–1	0–0	1–1
Estudiantes (SL)	0–2	1–1	1–2	2–1	1–1	2–1	2–2	1–1	1–0	2–1		1–0	1–1	1–0	0–0	0–1	1–0	0–2	1–1	1–1	3–3	0–1	1–1
Ferro Carril Oeste	3–1	0–0	0–0	2–1	2–1	0–0	4–3	0–0	0–0	1–1	0–0		3–0	4–0	1–2	1–2	2–1	7–2	0–0	4–1	1–1	1–0	1–1
Flandria	1–2	1–0	0–1	1–0	0–0	0–1	2–0	0–1	1–1	0–0	1–2	0–0		2–0	0–0	3–0	1–3	4–1	1–1	0–1	0–2	0–0	1–0
Gimnasia y Esgrima (J)	0–0	1–0	0–1	2–1	1–1	2–0	2–0	0–2	2–0	1–1	1–0	0–0	0–1		0–0	1–1	1–1	0–0	1–2	2–2	0–3	1–0	2–1
Guillermo Brown	0–0	1–0	0–0	2–2	0–0	3–1	0–0	3–0	1–0	2–0	4–1	4–1	0–1	1–0		1–0	2–2	0–0	2–0	0–3	4–0	0–0	3–1
Independiente Rivadavia	1–1	0–0	2–1	1–1	3–2	0–4	2–2	3–1	0–0	3–0	1–0	0–0	1–1	1–0	1–1		1–0	1–1	1–0	1–0	2–2	1–1	2–1
Instituto	0–1	1–0	2–1	1–0	1–0	5–2	3–2	2–3	2–1	1–1	1–2	2–0	0–2	3–1	2–0	1–0		5–2	2–2	1–0	1–1	2–2	1–1
Juventud Unida (G)	0–2	0–1	0–0	1–1	1–1	1–3	0–2	2–3	2–1	5–1	3–0	0–0	0–0	1–2	1–0	1–1	2–1		0–1	1–0	0–0	2–1	2–1
Los Andes	3–1	0–2	1–1	3–1	2–1	1–1	1–1	1–3	2–0	1–0	1–0	1–1	1–1	3–2	0–0	2–2	1–1	0–4		1–1	1–0	3–1	0–1
Nueva Chicago	2–0	0–1	1–2	2–0	2–2	0–1	0–0	1–1	1–1	0–1	2–1	1–1	0–1	0–1	2–0	0–1	2–1	5–1	2–1		1–0	3–0	3–1
San Martín (T)	3–2	1–1	2–2	4–2	2–0	2–1	2–2	0–2	1–0	3–1	2–0	0–1	2–0	3–0	1–2	1–2	1–1	1–2	2–3	2–0		1–1	1–2
Santamarina	1–0	0–0	0–3	2–1	1–1	3–1	1–2	1–1	2–0	2–2	1–0	1–1	0–0	0–0	2–0	0–2	1–0	4–1	2–1	0–0	1–0		5–0
Villa Dálmine	0–0	0–1	2–0	2–0	1–0	3–0	0–5	0–0	0–0	0–1	0–1	0–0	2–0	1–1	0–0	0–2	1–3	5–0	2–0	2–3	1–2	2–2	

Source: AFA
Legend: Blue = home team win; Yellow = draw; Red = away team win.

== Relegation ==
The bottom four teams of this table were relegated. In the Primera B Nacional, clubs with an indirect affiliation with Argentine Football Association are relegated to the Torneo Federal A, while clubs directly affiliated are relegated to Primera B Metropolitana.

Pos	Team	2014 Pts	2015 Pts	2016 Pts	2016–17 Pts	Total Pts	Total Pld	Avg	Relegation
1	Argentinos Juniors	31	–	–	88	119	64	1.859	
2	Chacarita Juniors	–	50	43	77	170	107	1.589	
3	Brown	–	–	28	65	93	65	1.431	
4	Guillermo Brown	–	48	30	75	153	107	1.43	
5	Nueva Chicago	30	–	30	60	120	85	1.412	
6	Santamarina	24	66	27	61	178	127	1.402	
7	San Martín (T)	–	–	–	61	61	44	1.386	
8	Gimnasia y Esgrima (J)	30	55	38	52	175	127	1.378	
9	Almagro	–	–	28	60	88	65	1.354	
10	Los Andes	–	54	30	59	143	107	1.336	
11	Ferro Carril Oeste	16	67	26	60	169	127	1.331	
12	Villa Dálmine	–	60	33	47	140	107	1.308	
13	Instituto	25	62	16	63	166	127	1.307	
14	Boca Unidos	27	54	38	47	166	127	1.307	
15	Juventud Unida (G)	–	54	28	55	137	107	1.28	
16	Flandria	–	–	–	56	56	44	1.273	
17	All Boys	22	53	26	60	161	127	1.268	
18	Independiente Rivadavia	22	51	20	67	160	127	1.26	
19	Estudiantes (SL)	–	56	24	54	134	107	1.252	
20	Central Córdoba (SdE) (R)	–	51	20	58	130	107	1.215	Primera B Metropolitana or Torneo Federal A
21	Douglas Haig (R)	25	58	20	50	153	127	1.205	Primera B Metropolitana or Torneo Federal A
22	Crucero del Norte (R)	33	–	32	37	102	85	1.2	Primera B Metropolitana or Torneo Federal A
23	Atlético Paraná (R)	–	58	19	39	116	107	1.084	Primera B Metropolitana or Torneo Federal A

Source: AFA

== Season statistics ==
=== Top scorers ===
As of July 30, 2017

Rank	Player	Club	Goals
1	(Argentina) Rodrigo Salinas	Chacarita Juniors	30
2	(Argentina) Tobías Figueroa	Guillermo Brown	21
3	(Argentina) Ramón Lentini	San Martín (T)	18
4	(Argentina) Gonzalo Castillejos	Ferro Carril Oeste	15
4	(Argentina) Nicolás Reniero	Almagro	15
4	(Argentina) Braian Romero	Argentinos Juniors	15

== See also ==
- 2016–17 Argentine Primera División
- 2016–17 Torneo Federal A
- 2015–16 Copa Argentina
