= Chacarita Juniors =

Argentine football club

- Full name: Club Atlético Chacarita Juniors
- Nicknames: Funebreros (Undertakers); Tricolor (Three-color)
- Founded: 1 May 1906; 120 years ago
- Ground: Estadio de Chacarita Juniors, Villa Maipú, San Martín
- Capacity: 19,000
- Chairman: Néstor Di Pierro
- Manager: Sergio Rondina
- League: Primera Nacional
- 2025: Primera Nacional Zone B, 9th of 18
- Website: chacaritajuniors.com.ar
Home colours	Away colours	Third colours

Club Atlético Chacarita Juniors (usually known simply as Chacarita) is an Argentine football club headquartered in Villa Crespo, Buenos Aires, while the stadium is located in Villa Maipú, General San Martín Partido of Greater Buenos Aires.

The squad currently plays in Primera Nacional, the second division of the Argentine football league system.

== History ==
The club was founded on 1 May 1906, in an anarchist Library on the boundary between the Villa Crespo and Chacarita neighbourhoods. After a short period of institutional crisis, the club was re-opened in 1919.

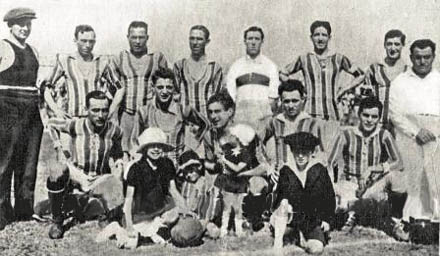
Chacarita in 1924, when winning the División Intermedia title

The football squad promoted to Primera División in 1924, and continued playing at the top level after football became professional in 1931.

In 1940 Chacarita was relegated to the second division, but it lasted only one season. The team then moved to the General San Martín Partido in Greater Buenos Aires, next to the autonomous city of Buenos Aires.

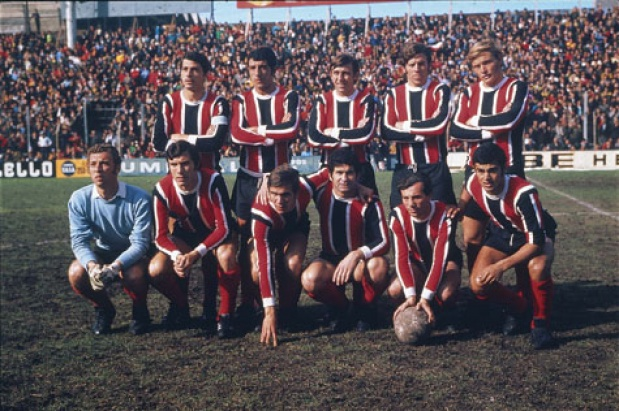
The 1969 Torneo Metropolitano champions

In 1956 Chacarita was relegated to the second division again, and won that championship the following year returning to Primera División. After 10 consecutive years at the top level, Chacarita won its only first division title, the 1969 Metropolitano championship.

In the following years the team performed badly and was relegated all the way down to the 3rd division in 1980. In 1984 Chacarita came back to the first division, but because of hooliganism by some of its fans, the club was punished with a suspension for a month and a loss of 10 points; having missing those points, Chacarita could not avoid a new relegation to the second division.

After a long tenure in lower divisions (including the Primera C), Chacarita came back to the top division in 1999, where the team remained until 2004 Torneo Clausura, when it was relegated to the Primera B Nacional.

In the 2008–09 season the club finished 2nd, after a 1–0 victory against Platense, with a goal scored in the last seconds of the match. This victory secured Chacarita a return to Primera División after five years of being relegated.

At the end of 2011–12 season, Chacarita finished 20th and therefore the Funebreros had to play two matches against Nueva Chicago (winner of Primera B Metropolitana's Torneo Reducido) to avoid being relegated to the lower division. Nueva Chicago won the series (1–0 and 1–1) and Chacarita was subsequently relegated.

== Kit evolution ==
1906	1920–present	1931^{(1)}

^{(1)} Used during the 1931 championship as a tribute to club's first jersey.

== Nickname ==
The team got the nickname of Funebreros ("Undertakers") because its ground was near the La Chacarita Cemetery. The red color in its jersey (apart from black and white) is a reference to its socialist origins.

== Rivalries ==
Chacarita's main rivals are Atlanta and Nueva Chicago. The rivalry with Atlanta is called Clasico de Villa Crespo.

== Supporters ==
Chacarita are also known for their fanbase, which has been considered one of the most violent in Argentina; their fanbase have received sanctions on several occasions for violent acts.

== Stadium ==
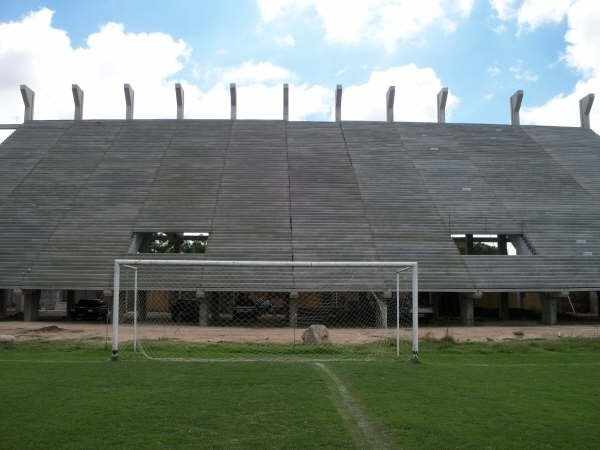
View of a goal zone grandstand in 2009

Chacarita's stadium was reopened on 30 January 2011, after its closure for a total rebuild (which consisted in replacing the old wood seats for the more modern cement structures, according to safety regulations) since May 2008. As part of the celebration for the reopening, the club organized a friendly match between Chacarita and Argentinos Juniors (which ended 0–0). For this special event only 13,260 seats were available. Once the remodelling is totally finished, the stadium will be able to host an attendance of 35,000.

The new stadium was erected in the same location where the old one was, in the Villa Maipú neighborhood, General San Martín Partido. The last game played by Chacarita before the remodelling had been on 21 October 2005, during a match for the Primera B Nacional championship. The rival was Tigre (which has a strong rivalry with Chacarita) and El Funebrero won 3–0.

== Players ==
=== Current squad ===
As of 11 July 2022.

Note: Flags indicate national team as defined under FIFA eligibility rules; some limited exceptions apply. Players may hold more than one non-FIFA nationality.

No.	Pos.	Nation	Player
—	GK	ARG	Gaston Brambatti
—	GK	ARG	Federico Losas
—	GK	ARG	Germán Salort
—	DF	ARG	Juan Alvacete
—	DF	ARG	Tomás Berra
—	DF	ARG	Lautaro Formica
—	DF	ARG	Leandro Lacunza
—	DF	ARG	Alejandro Manchot
—	DF	ARG	Abel Masuero
—	DF	ARG	Federico Rosso
—	DF	ARG	Facundo Tallarico
—	MF	ARG	Exequiel Benavídez
—	MF	ARG	Ricardo Blanco
—	MF	ARG	Tobías Fernández
—	MF	ARG	Hernán Fredes
—	MF	ARG	Juan Cruz González
—	MF	ARG	Rodrigo González

No.	Pos.	Nation	Player
—	MF	ARG	Enzo Hoyos
—	MF	ARG	Saúl Nelle
—	MF	ARG	Luciano Perdomo
—	MF	ARG	Agustín Piñeyro
—	MF	ARG	Mariano Del Col (loan from Fassano)
—	MF	ARG	Gonzalo Groba
—	FW	ARG	Nahuel Maidana (loan from Ferro)
—	FW	ARG	Nicolás Chávez
—	FW	ARG	Santiago Godoy (loan from Racing Club)
—	FW	ARG	José Méndez
—	FW	ARG	Facundo Parra
—	FW	ARG	Ignacio Russo (loan from Racing Club)
—	FW	ARG	Mauricio Tévez
—	FW	VEN	Ronaldo Peña (loan from UCV)
—	FW	ARG	Ariel López
—	FW	ARG	Elías Alderete

=== Out on loan ===
Note: Flags indicate national team as defined under FIFA eligibility rules; some limited exceptions apply. Players may hold more than one non-FIFA nationality.

No.	Pos.	Nation	Player

== Managers ==
- (Argentina) Ernesto Duchini (1939–43)
- (Argentina) Alfio Basile (1975–76)
- (Argentina) Carlos Cavagnaro (1988)
- (Argentina) Héctor Rivoira (1997–00)
- (Argentina) Reinaldo Merlo (1998–99)
- (Argentina) Osvaldo Sosa (2000–02)
- (Argentina) Néstor Craviotto (2003)
- (Argentina) Nestor Clausen (2004–05)
- (Argentina) Héctor Rivoira (2005–07), (2011)
- (Argentina) Dalcio Giovagnoli (2008)
- (Argentina) Ricardo Zielinski (2008–09)
- (Argentina) Fernando Gamboa (2009–10)
- (Argentina) Mauro Navas (2010)
- (Uruguay) Felipe De la Riva (2011–12)
- (Colombia) (Argentina) Carlos Navarro Montoya (2013)
- (Argentina) Carlos Fabián Leeb (2013–14)

== Presidents ==
- (Argentina) Maximino Lema: 1906-1920
- (Argentina) Alfonso Colángelo: 1921-1922
- (Argentina) José Manuel Lema: 1923-1924
- (Argentina) Virgilio Uriburu: 1925-1926
- (Argentina) Tiburcio Padilla: 1927-1933
- (Argentina) Eugenio Bressán: 1934-1935
- (Argentina) Enrique Garrido: 1936-1939
- (Argentina) Tiburcio Padilla: 1940-1941
- (Argentina) Jesús Pravía: 1942-1943
- (Argentina) Ernesto Mantero: 1944-1945
- (Argentina) Miguel de las Heras: 1946-1951
- (Argentina) E. O. Cadario: 1951-1954
- (Argentina) Casimiro López: 1955-1956
- (Argentina) David Francheschi: 1956
- (Argentina) Ángel Colombo: 1957
- (Argentina) Carlos Lema: 1957-1958
- (Argentina) Julio López: 1959-1964
- (Argentina) Pedro M. Belloni: 1965-1966
- (Argentina) Enrique Nader: 1967-1970
- (Argentina) Antonio Gómez: 1971-1972
- (Argentina) Luis Donato: 1973-1974
- (Argentina) Salvador Zucotti: 1974-1980
- (Argentina) Mario Espósito: 1981-1984
- (Argentina) Roberto Gómez Fernández: 1985-1987
- (Argentina) José García: 1987-1988
- (Argentina) Carlos Cerrutti: 1988-1993
- (Argentina) Luis Barrionuevo: 1993-2005
- (Argentina) Horacio Fernández: 2005-2009
- (Argentina) Vicente Celio: 2009-2012
- (Argentina) Osvaldo Lobato: 2012
- (Argentina) Héctor López: 2012-2016
- (Argentina) Daniel Vita: 2016
- (Argentina) Horacio Fernández: 2016-2021
- (Argentina) Néstor Di Pierro: 2021-

== Honours ==
=== National ===
- Primera División (1): 1969 Metropolitano
- Primera B Metropolitana (3): 1941, 1959, 1993–94
- División Intermedia (1): 1924
