= 2019–20 San Lorenzo de Almagro season =

San Lorenzo
2019–20 season
- President: Matías Lammens
- Manager: Juan Antonio Pizzi
- Stadium: Estadio Pedro Bidegain
- Top goalscorer: League: Bruno Pittón (3); All: Bruno Pittón (3)

The 2019–20 season is San Lorenzo's 35th consecutive season in the top division of Argentine football. In addition to the Primera División, the club are competing in the Copa Argentina, Copa de la Superliga and Copa Libertadores.

The season generally covers the period from 1 July 2019 to 30 June 2020.

== Review ==
=== Pre-season ===
San Lorenzo snapped up Chacarita Juniors youngster Franco Romero in May. Germán Berterame sealed a move away on 6 June, agreeing a transfer to Atlético San Luis of Liga MX; a deal that was officially completed on 14 June. The club agreed, in principle, to the transfers of Unión Santa Fe brothers Bruno and Mauro Pittón on 21 June; subject to terms and medicals. The duo completed their moves in the following twenty-four hours. On 24 June, San Lorenzo announced the signing of Ezequiel Cerutti; days after the winger had terminated his contract with Al-Hilal of the Saudi Professional League. Gonzalo Jaque and Ezequiel Ávila sealed departures on 26/27 June. Santiago Vergini, having spent 2018–19 with Bursaspor, returned home with San Lorenzo on 27 June.

Lucas Menossi joined on 28 June. Rodrigo De Ciancio departed San Lorenzo for Atlanta on 29 June, a day prior to Santiago González heading to Nueva Chicago on loan. 2018–19 loans expired on/around 30 June. Juan Antonio Pizzi's men took on their reserves on 3 July to kick off their pre-season schedule. A win and a loss occurred in games on 6 July versus Deportivo Morón, with San Lorenzo winning 3–0. Gabriel Rojas was loaned to Peñarol on 6 July. Adam Bareiro became San Lorenzo's seventh reinforcement, as he penned a one-year loan deal, with a purchase option, from Liga MX's Monterrey. Alejandro Melo agreed a move to Coquimbo Unido. Estudiantes were met in friendlies on 13 July, with a goalless draw being followed by a 3–2 home win.

Aldosivi completed the signing of Román Martínez on 18 July. Also on that day, Ferro Carril Oeste were defeated in exhibition matches at the Estadio Pedro Bidegain. Damián Pérez went to Spain with Sporting Gijón on 19 July. Gerónimo Poblete came on loan from Metz on 21 July, having spent the past season loaned to San Lorenzo from the French outfit. Tomás Conechny was signed permanently by Major League Soccer's Portland Timbers on 22 July, after spending the past twelve months on loan in the United States. Soon after, Ariel Rojas headed off to Atlético Tucumán.

=== July ===
San Lorenzo played the first leg of their Copa Libertadores round of sixteen tie with Cerro Porteño of Paraguay on 24 July, with the encounter ending in a goalless draw in Buenos Aires. Raúl Loaiza's loan from Atlético Nacional was ended in July, allowing him to sign for Defensa y Justicia on 25 July. San Lorenzo started their league season with a win over Godoy Cruz on 27 July, with Nicolás Blandi securing the points with a late penalty. Juan Ramírez put pen to paper on a four-year contract from Talleres on 30 July. Gonzalo Castellani became the eighth player to leave San Lorenzo on 30 July, as he agreed terms with Atlético Tucumán. San Lorenzo were eliminated from the Copa Libertadores on 31 July, as Cerro Porteño beat them 2–1 in the second leg in Paraguay.

=== August ===
3 August saw youth player Gonzalo Berterame depart to Gimnasia y Esgrima (M). San Lorenzo followed up their Primera División victory on 27 July with another three points over Gimnasia y Esgrima (LP) on 4 August. Felix Villacorta signed for Uruguayan Segunda División side Atenas on 6 August. On 8 August, San Lorenzo announced the double signing of twin brothers Ángel Romero (Corinthians) and Óscar Romero (Shanghai Shenhua). Alejandro Molina was loaned to Gimnasia y Esgrima (M) on 12 August. Nicolás Reniero transferred to Eduardo Coudet's Racing Club on 13 August. Santamarina captured Jonás Acevedo on loan on 14 August. San Lorenzo came from two down to secure a point at the Estadio Pedro Bidegain versus Rosario Central on 17 August.

On 19 August, Spanish third tier club Cultural Leonesa revealed the loan signing of Gabriel Gudiño. San Lorenzo continued their undefeated streak in the Primera División on 23 August, as well as ending the perfect start of Arsenal de Sarandí at the Estadio Julio Humberto Grondona after strikes from Juan Ramírez and Nicolás Blandi. San Lorenzo maintained their unbeaten beginning to the league season with a win over Unión Santa Fe on 31 August.

== Squad ==
Squad No.	Nationality	Name	Position(s)	Date of birth (age)	Signed from
Goalkeepers
12	Argentina	Sebastián Torrico	GK	22 February 1980 (age 46)	Godoy Cruz
13	Argentina	Lautaro López	GK	24 January 2001 (age 25)	Academy
22	Argentina	Nicolás Navarro	GK	25 March 1985 (age 41)	Gimnasia y Esgrima (LP)
25	Argentina	José Devecchi	GK	9 July 1995 (age 31)	Academy
Defensores
2	Argentina	Gonzalo Rodríguez	CB	10 April 1984 (age 42)	Fiorentina
3	Argentina	Bruno Pittón	LB	1 February 1993 (age 33)	Unión Santa Fe
4	Argentina	Gino Peruzzi	RB	9 June 1992 (age 34)	Boca Juniors
6	Argentina	Marcos Senesi	CB	10 May 1997 (age 29)	Academy
17	Argentina	Elías Pereyra	LB	15 February 1999 (age 27)	Academy
24	Argentina	Federico Gattoni	CB	16 February 1999 (age 27)	Academy
27	Argentina	Santiago Vergini	CB	3 August 1988 (age 38)	Bursaspor
29	Argentina	Víctor Salazar	RB	26 May 1993 (age 33)	Rosario Central
32	Argentina	Fabricio Coloccini	CB	22 January 1982 (age 44)	Newcastle United
39	Argentina	Gastón Hernández	DF	19 January 1998 (age 28)	Academy
41	Argentina	Gianluca Ferrari	CB	30 June 1997 (age 29)	Montecatini
42	Argentina	Marcelo Herrera	CB	3 November 1998 (age 28)	Academy
45	Argentina	José Vivanco	DF	22 February 1998 (age 28)	Academy
	Argentina	Santiago López	CB	15 August 1997 (age 29)	Academy
	Argentina	Nicolás Zalazar	CB	29 January 1997 (age 29)	Academy
Midfielders
5	Argentina	Lucas Menossi	RM	11 July 1993 (age 33)	Tigre
8	Argentina	Mauro Pittón	DM	8 August 1994 (age 32)	Unión Santa Fe
10	Paraguay	Óscar Romero	AM	4 July 1992 (age 34)	Shanghai Shenhua
16	Argentina	Fernando Belluschi	AM	10 September 1983 (age 43)	Cruz Azul
19	Argentina	Rubén Botta	AM	31 January 1990 (age 36)	Pachuca
20	Argentina	Juan Ramírez	LM	25 May 1993 (age 33)	Talleres
21	Argentina	Gerónimo Poblete	DM	2 January 1993 (age 33)	Metz (loan)
28	Argentina	Nahuel Barrios	AM	7 May 1998 (age 28)	Academy
33	Argentina	Alexander Díaz	RW	22 March 2000 (age 26)	Once Tigres
35	Argentina	Matías Palacios	AM	10 May 2002 (age 24)	Academy
36	Argentina	Manuel Insaurralde	CM	31 January 1999 (age 27)	Academy
37	Argentina	Emanuel Maciel	MF	28 March 1997 (age 29)	Academy
40	Argentina	Agustín Martegani	MF	20 May 2000 (age 26)	Academy
	Argentina	Brian Benítez	MF	17 April 1996 (age 30)	Academy
	Argentina	Emiliano Purita	RM	25 March 1997 (age 29)	Academy
Forwards
7	Paraguay	Adam Bareiro	CF	26 July 1996 (age 30)	Monterrey
9	Argentina	Nicolás Blandi	CF	31 January 1990 (age 36)	Boca Juniors
11	Argentina	Ezequiel Cerutti	LW	17 January 1992 (age 34)	Al-Hilal
26	Argentina	Héctor Fértoli	LW	3 December 1994 (age 31)	Newell's Old Boys
38	Argentina	Adolfo Gaich	CF	26 February 1999 (age 27)	Academy
92	Paraguay	Ángel Romero	CF	4 July 1992 (age 34)	Corinthians
	Argentina	Lautaro Carrachino	FW	16 April 1997 (age 29)	Academy
Out on loan					Loaned to
14	Argentina	Jonás Acevedo	AM	6 February 1997 (age 29)	Santamarina
23	Argentina	Santiago González	CF	25 July 1999 (age 27)	Nueva Chicago
	Argentina	Alexis Castro	LM	18 October 1994 (age 32)	Defensa y Justicia
	Argentina	Rodrigo Contreras	CF	27 October 1995 (age 31)	Necaxa
	Argentina	Gabriel Gudiño	RM	16 March 1992 (age 34)	Cultural Leonesa
	Argentina	Bautista Merlini	LM	4 July 1995 (age 31)	Defensa y Justicia
	Argentina	Alejandro Molina	RB	10 August 1997 (age 29)	Gimnasia y Esgrima (M)
	Argentina	Lautaro Montoya	LB	7 October 1994 (age 32)	Chacarita Juniors
	Argentina	Franco Moyano	CM	13 September 1997 (age 29)	Argentinos Juniors
	Argentina	Gabriel Rojas	LB	22 June 1997 (age 29)	Peñarol
	Argentina	Rodrigo Tapia	CB	28 September 1994 (age 32)	Banfield

== Transfers ==
Domestic transfer windows:
3 July 2019 to 24 September 2019
20 January 2020 to 19 February 2020.

=== Transfers in ===
Date from	Position	Nationality	Name	From	Ref.
3 July 2019 (Note: Deal agreed on 23 May 2019)	MF	Argentina	Franco Romero	Chacarita Juniors	
3 July 2019 (Note: Deal agreed on 22 June 2019)	LB	Argentina	Bruno Pittón	Unión Santa Fe	
3 July 2019 (Note: Deal agreed on 22 June 2019)	DM	Argentina	Mauro Pittón	Unión Santa Fe	
3 July 2019 (Note: Deal agreed on 24 June 2019)	LW	Argentina	Ezequiel Cerutti	Al-Hilal	
3 July 2019 (Note: Deal agreed on 27 June 2019)	CB	Argentina	Santiago Vergini	Bursaspor	
3 July 2019 (Note: Deal agreed on 28 June 2019)	RM	Argentina	Lucas Menossi	Tigre	
30 July 2019	LM	Argentina	Juan Ramírez	Talleres	
8 August 2019	CF	Paraguay	Ángel Romero	Corinthians	
8 August 2019	AM	Paraguay	Óscar Romero	Shanghai Shenhua	

=== Transfers out ===
Date from	Position	Nationality	Name	To	Ref.
14 June 2019 (Note: Deal agreed on 6 June 2019)	RW	Argentina	Germán Berterame	Atlético San Luis	
1 July 2019 (Note: Deal agreed on 27 June 2019)	FW	Argentina	Ezequiel Ávila	Osasuna	
3 July 2019 (Note: Deal agreed on 26 June 2019)	AM	Argentina	Gonzalo Jaque	Almagro	
3 July 2019 (Note: Deal agreed on 28 June 2019)	DM	Argentina	Rodrigo De Ciancio	Atlanta	
18 July 2019	DM	Argentina	Román Martínez	Aldosivi	
19 July 2019	LB	Argentina	Damián Pérez	Sporting Gijón	
22 July 2019	RW	Argentina	Tomás Conechny	Portland Timbers	
22 July 2019	LM	Argentina	Ariel Rojas	Atlético Tucumán	
23 July 2019 (Note: Deal agreed on 30 June 2019)	AM	Argentina	Alejandro Melo	Coquimbo Unido	
30 July 2019	AM	Argentina	Gonzalo Castellani	Atlético Tucumán	
3 August 2019	AM	Argentina	Gonzalo Berterame	Gimnasia y Esgrima (M)	
6 August 2019	CF	Argentina	Felix Villacorta	Atenas	
13 August 2019	CF	Argentina	Nicolás Reniero	Racing Club	

=== Loans in ===
Start date	Position	Nationality	Name	From	End date	Ref.
8 July 2019	CF	Paraguay	Adam Bareiro	Monterrey	30 June 2020	
21 July 2019	DM	Argentina	Gerónimo Poblete	Metz	30 June 2020	

=== Loans out ===
Start date	Position	Nationality	Name	To	End date	Ref.
3 July 2019 (Note: Deal agreed on 30 June 2019)	CF	Argentina	Santiago González	Nueva Chicago	30 June 2020	
6 July 2019	LB	Argentina	Gabriel Rojas	Peñarol	31 December 2019	
12 August 2019	RB	Argentina	Alejandro Molina	Gimnasia y Esgrima (M)	30 June 2020	
14 August 2019	AM	Argentina	Jonás Acevedo	Santamarina	30 June 2020	
19 August 2019	RM	Argentina	Gabriel Gudiño	Cultural Leonesa	30 June 2020	

== Friendlies ==
=== Pre-season ===
Deportivo Morón announced an exhibition fixture with San Lorenzo on 19 June 2019, with the match set for 6 July. A trip to Estudiantes was confirmed on 22 June for 13 July. However, the game's host was reversed on 28 June as their opponents revealed it would take place at the Estadio Pedro Bidegain. Friendlies with their reserves started their pre-season. Details for the encounter with Deportivo Morón were set on 5 July. A fixture with Ferro Carril Oeste was revealed on 12 July.

Win Draw Loss

3 July 2019 Friendly	San Lorenzo	?	San Lorenzo Reserves	Buenos Aires, Argentina
		San Lorenzo; 50 min. match		Stadium: Estadio Pedro Bidegain

3 July 2019 Friendly	San Lorenzo	?	San Lorenzo Reserves	Buenos Aires, Argentina
		San Lorenzo; 50 min. match		Stadium: Estadio Pedro Bidegain

6 July 2019 Friendly	San Lorenzo	3–0	Deportivo Morón	Buenos Aires, Argentina
09:00 GMT-3	B. Pittón; F. Coloccini	San Lorenzo; Olé; 70 min. match		Stadium: Estadio Pedro Bidegain; Attendance: 0 (Note: Behind closed doors.)

6 July 2019 Friendly	San Lorenzo	0–1	Deportivo Morón	Buenos Aires, Argentina
		San Lorenzo; Olé; 75 min. match	D. Akerman	Stadium: Estadio Pedro Bidegain; Attendance: 0 (Note: Behind closed doors.)

13 July 2019 Friendly	San Lorenzo	0–0	Estudiantes	Buenos Aires, Argentina
		San Lorenzo; AS		Stadium: Estadio Pedro Bidegain; Referee: Francisco López (Argentina)

13 July 2019 Friendly	San Lorenzo	3–2	Estudiantes	Buenos Aires, Argentina
	M. Pittón 3'; N. Barrios 15'; N. Reniero 45'	San Lorenzo; AS; 60 min. match	N. Estévez 30+3'; D. García 57'	Stadium: Estadio Pedro Bidegain; Referee: Francisco López (Argentina)

18 July 2019 Friendly	San Lorenzo	2–1	Ferro Carril Oeste	Buenos Aires, Argentina
	H. Fértoli 11', 32'	San Lorenzo; ESPN; 80 min. match	E. Díaz	Stadium: Estadio Pedro Bidegain; Referee: Leandro Idio (Argentina)

18 July 2019 Friendly	San Lorenzo	1–0	Ferro Carril Oeste	Buenos Aires, Argentina
	N. Barrios 10'	San Lorenzo; ESPN; 80 min. match		Stadium: Estadio Pedro Bidegain; Referee: Leandro Idio (Argentina)

== Competitions ==
=== Primera División ===
==== League table ====
Pos	Team	Pld	W	D	L	GF	GA	GD	Pts
6	Defensa y Justicia	23	10	6	7	26	18	+8	36
7	Lanús	23	9	9	5	32	29	+3	36
8	San Lorenzo	23	11	3	9	32	30	+2	36
9	Rosario Central	23	9	9	5	31	29	+2	36
10	Newell's Old Boys	23	9	8	6	33	25	+8	35

Source: AFA
Rules for classification: 1) points; 2) play-off (only if needed to decide championship); 3) goal difference; 4) goals scored; 5) head-to-head points; 6) head-to-head goal difference; 7) head-to-head goals scored.

==== Relegation table ====
Pos	Team	2017–18 Pts	2018–19 Pts	2019–20 Pts	Total Pts	Total Pld	Avg	Relegation
8	Talleres (C)	46	33	10	89	57	1.561	
9	Huracán	48	35	5	88	57	1.544	
10	San Lorenzo	50	23	13	86	57	1.509	
11	Vélez Sarsfield	38	40	7	85	57	1.491	
12	Atlético Tucumán	36	42	6	84	57	1.474	

Source: AFA

==== Results summary ====
Overall								Home						Away					
Pld	W	D	L	GF	GA	GD	Pts	W	D	L	GF	GA	GD	W	D	L	GF	GA	GD
5	4	1	0	10	5	+5	13	2	1	0	7	5	+2	2	0	0	3	0	+3

Last updated: 31 August 2019.
Source: Soccerway

==== Matches ====
The fixtures for the 2019–20 campaign were released on 10 July.

Win Draw Loss

27 July 2019 1	San Lorenzo	3–2	Godoy Cruz	Buenos Aires, Argentina
15:30 GMT-3	N. Barrios 5'; G. Peruzzi 73'; N. Blandi 90+1' (pen.)	San Lorenzo; Infobae; Soccerway	T. Badaloni 53'; R. Prieto 57'	Stadium: Estadio Pedro Bidegain; Referee: Andrés Merlos (Argentina)

4 August 2019 2	Gimnasia y Esgrima (LP)	0–1	San Lorenzo	La Plata, Argentina
13:15 GMT-3		San Lorenzo; Infobae; Soccerway	B. Pittón 79'	Stadium: Estadio Juan Carmelo Zerillo; Referee: Fernando Espinoza (Argentina)

17 August 2019 3	San Lorenzo	2–2	Rosario Central	Buenos Aires, Argentina
17:45 GMT-3	F. Belluschi 23'; B. Pittón 42'	San Lorenzo; Infobae; Soccerway	C. Riaño 12'; C. Rius 21'	Stadium: Estadio Pedro Bidegain; Referee: Fernando Rapallini (Argentina)

23 August 2019 4	Arsenal de Sarandí	0–2	San Lorenzo	Sarandí, Argentina
21:00 GMT-3		San Lorenzo; Infobae; Soccerway	J. Ramírez 33'; N. Blandi 44'	Stadium: Estadio Julio Humberto Grondona; Referee: Facundo Tello (Argentina)

31 August 2019 5	San Lorenzo	2–1	Unión Santa Fe	Buenos Aires, Argentina
15:30 GMT-3	Á. Romero 3'; B. Pittón 20'	San Lorenzo; Infobae; Soccerway	E. Bonifacio 38'	Stadium: Estadio Pedro Bidegain; Referee: Nicolás Lamolina (Argentina)

6	Colón	–	San Lorenzo	Santa Fe, Argentina
				Stadium: Estadio Brigadier General Estanislao López

=== Copa Argentina ===
Win Draw Loss

	–
00:00 GMT-3

=== Copa de la Superliga ===
Win Draw Loss

	–
00:00 GMT-3

=== Copa Libertadores ===
San Lorenzo's opponents for the Copa Libertadores round of sixteen were drawn in May 2019, as they received Cerro Porteño of the Paraguayan Primera División.

Win Draw Loss

24 July 2019 R16 L1	San Lorenzo	0–0	Cerro Porteño	Buenos Aires, Argentina
19:15 GMT-3		San Lorenzo; Infobae; Soccerway		Stadium: Estadio Pedro Bidegain; Referee: Roberto Tobar (Chile)

31 July 2019 R16 L2	Cerro Porteño	2–1 (2–1 agg.)	San Lorenzo	Asunción, Paraguay
19:15 GMT-3	J. Larrivey 56' (pen.); Ó. Ruiz 63'	San Lorenzo; Infobae; Soccerway	A. Bareiro 18' (pen.)	Stadium: Estadio General Pablo Rojas; Referee: Wilmar Roldán (Colombia)

== Squad statistics ==
=== Appearances and goals ===
No.	Pos.	Nationality	Name	League		Cup		League Cup		Continental		Total		Discipline		Ref
No.	Pos.	Nationality	Name	Apps	Goals	Apps	Goals	Apps	Goals	Apps	Goals	Apps	Goals	Yellow card	Red card	Ref
2	CB	Argentina	Gonzalo Rodríguez	0	0	0	0	0	0	0	0	0	0	0	0	
3	LB	Argentina	Bruno Pittón	4	3	0	0	0	0	2	0	6	3	0	0	
4	RB	Argentina	Gino Peruzzi	2	1	0	0	0	0	0(1)	0	2(1)	1	0	0	
5	RM	Argentina	Lucas Menossi	4	0	0	0	0	0	2	0	6	0	4	0	
6	CB	Argentina	Marcos Senesi	4	0	0	0	0	0	2	0	6	0	2	0	
7	CF	Paraguay	Adam Bareiro	2(1)	0	0	0	0	0	2	1	4(1)	1	0	0	
8	DM	Argentina	Mauro Pittón	1(3)	0	0	0	0	0	0	0	1(3)	0	0	0	
9	CF	Argentina	Nicolás Blandi	2(1)	2	0	0	0	0	0(1)	0	2(2)	2	0	0	
10	AM	Paraguay	Óscar Romero	1(2)	0	0	0	0	0	0	0	1(2)	0	0	0	
11	LW	Argentina	Ezequiel Cerutti	0(1)	0	0	0	0	0	2	0	2(1)	0	1	0	
12	GK	Argentina	Sebastián Torrico	0	0	0	0	0	0	2	0	2	0	0	0	
13	GK	Argentina	Lautaro López	0	0	0	0	0	0	0	0	0	0	0	0	
14	AM	Argentina	Jonás Acevedo	0	0	0	0	0	0	0	0	0	0	0	0	
16	AM	Argentina	Fernando Belluschi	3	1	0	0	0	0	2	0	5	1	0	0	
17	LB	Argentina	Elías Pereyra	1	0	0	0	0	0	0	0	1	0	0	0	
19	AM	Argentina	Rubén Botta	1	0	0	0	0	0	0	0	1	0	0	0	
20	LM	Argentina	Juan Ramírez	1(1)	1	0	0	0	0	0	0	1(1)	1	0	0	
21	DM	Argentina	Gerónimo Poblete	4	0	0	0	0	0	2	0	6	0	2	0	
22	GK	Argentina	Nicolás Navarro	5	0	0	0	0	0	0	0	5	0	0	0	
23	CF	Argentina	Santiago González	0	0	0	0	0	0	0	0	0	0	0	0	
24	CB	Argentina	Federico Gattoni	0	0	0	0	0	0	0	0	0	0	0	0	
25	GK	Argentina	José Devecchi	0	0	0	0	0	0	0	0	0	0	0	0	
26	LW	Argentina	Héctor Fértoli	1	0	0	0	0	0	2	0	3	0	0	0	
27	CB	Argentina	Santiago Vergini	1(1)	0	0	0	0	0	0	0	1(1)	0	0	0	
28	AM	Argentina	Nahuel Barrios	4(1)	1	0	0	0	0	0(2)	0	4(3)	1	1	0	
29	RB	Argentina	Víctor Salazar	3	0	0	0	0	0	2	0	5	0	2	0	
32	CB	Argentina	Fabricio Coloccini	4	0	0	0	0	0	2	0	6	0	0	0	
33	RW	Argentina	Alexander Díaz	1(2)	0	0	0	0	0	0	0	1(2)	0	0	0	
35	AM	Argentina	Matías Palacios	0	0	0	0	0	0	0	0	0	0	0	0	
36	CM	Argentina	Manuel Insaurralde	0(1)	0	0	0	0	0	0	0	0(1)	0	0	0	
37	MF	Argentina	Emanuel Maciel	1	0	0	0	0	0	0	0	1	0	0	0	
38	CF	Argentina	Adolfo Gaich	0(1)	0	0	0	0	0	0	0	0(1)	0	0	0	
39	DF	Argentina	Gastón Hernández	0	0	0	0	0	0	0	0	0	0	0	0	
40	MF	Argentina	Agustín Martegani	0	0	0	0	0	0	0	0	0	0	0	0	
41	CB	Argentina	Gianluca Ferrari	1	0	0	0	0	0	0	0	1	0	0	0	
42	CB	Argentina	Marcelo Herrera	0	0	0	0	0	0	0	0	0	0	0	0	
45	DF	Argentina	José Vivanco	0	0	0	0	0	0	0	0	0	0	0	0	
92	CF	Paraguay	Ángel Romero	2	1	0	0	0	0	0	0	2	1	0	0	
–	MF	Argentina	Brian Benítez	0	0	0	0	0	0	0	0	0	0	0	0	
–	FW	Argentina	Lautaro Carrachino	0	0	0	0	0	0	0	0	0	0	0	0	
–	LM	Argentina	Alexis Castro	0	0	0	0	0	0	0	0	0	0	0	0	
–	CF	Argentina	Rodrigo Contreras	0	0	0	0	0	0	0	0	0	0	0	0	
–	RM	Argentina	Gabriel Gudiño	0	0	0	0	0	0	0	0	0	0	0	0	
–	CB	Argentina	Santiago López	0	0	0	0	0	0	0	0	0	0	0	0	
–	LM	Argentina	Bautista Merlini	0	0	0	0	0	0	0	0	0	0	0	0	
–	RB	Argentina	Alejandro Molina	0	0	0	0	0	0	0	0	0	0	0	0	
–	LB	Argentina	Lautaro Montoya	0	0	0	0	0	0	0	0	0	0	0	0	
–	CM	Argentina	Franco Moyano	0	0	0	0	0	0	0	0	0	0	0	0	
–	RM	Argentina	Emiliano Purita	0	0	0	0	0	0	0	0	0	0	0	0	
–	LB	Argentina	Gabriel Rojas	0	0	0	0	0	0	0	0	0	0	0	0	
–	CB	Argentina	Rodrigo Tapia	0	0	0	0	0	0	0	0	0	0	0	0	
–	CB	Argentina	Nicolás Zalazar	0	0	0	0	0	0	0	0	0	0	0	0	
Own goals				—	0	—	0	—	0	—	0	—	0	—	—	—
Players who left during the season
15	CF	Argentina	Nicolás Reniero	2	0	0	0	0	0	0(2)	0	2(2)	0	2	0	
30	DM	Colombia	Raúl Loaiza	0	0	0	0	0	0	0	0	0	0	0	0	
–	AM	Argentina	Gonzalo Castellani	0	0	0	0	0	0	0	0	0	0	0	0	
–	CB	Argentina	Felix Villacorta	0	0	0	0	0	0	0	0	0	0	0	0	

Statistics accurate as of 31 August 2019.

=== Goalscorers ===
Rank	Pos	No.	Nat	Name	League	Cup	League Cup	Continental	Total	Ref
1	LB	3	Argentina	Bruno Pittón	2	0	0	0	2	
1	CF	9	Argentina	Nicolás Blandi	2	0	0	0	2	
2	AM	28	Argentina	Nahuel Barrios	1	0	0	0	1	
2	RB	4	Argentina	Gino Peruzzi	1	0	0	0	1	
2	CF	7	Paraguay	Adam Bareiro	0	0	0	1	1	
2	AM	16	Argentina	Fernando Belluschi	1	0	0	0	1	
2	LM	20	Argentina	Juan Ramírez	1	0	0	0	1	
2	CF	92	Paraguay	Ángel Romero	1	0	0	0	1	
Own goals					0	0	0	0	0	
Totals					9	0	0	1	10	—
