= 2017–18 Club Atlético Temperley season =

Club Atlético Temperley
2017–18 season
- President: Alberto Lecchi
- Manager: Gustavo Álvarez (until 5 November 2017); Gastón Esmerado (from 9 November 2017)
- Stadium: Estadio Alfredo Beranger
- Primera División: 23rd
- 2016–17 Copa Argentina: Round of 32
- 2017–18 Copa Argentina: Round of 64
- Top goalscorer: League: Adrián Arregui (3); All: Adrián Arregui (3)

The 2017–18 season is Club Atlético Temperley's 4th consecutive season in the top-flight of Argentine football. The season covers the period from 1 July 2017 to 30 June 2018.

== Current squad ==
As of 22 August 2017.

Note: Flags indicate national team as defined under FIFA eligibility rules; some limited exceptions apply. Players may hold more than one non-FIFA nationality.

No.	Pos.	Nation	Player
2	DF	ARG	Ignacio Bogino
6	DF	ARG	Gastón Aguirre
10	FW	ARG	Ariel Cólzera
11	MF	ARG	Leonardo Di Lorenzo
14	DF	ARG	Alexis Zárate (on loan from Independiente)
18	DF	ARG	Lucas Mulazzi
19	FW	ARG	Marcos Figueroa
20	GK	ARG	Leandro De Bortoli
26	MF	ARG	Darío Salina
30	DF	ARG	Gonzalo Escobar
32	MF	ARG	Rodrigo Córdoba
36	MF	ARG	Emiliano Ozuna (on loan from Estudiantes)

No.	Pos.	Nation	Player
—	DF	ARG	Adrián Arregui
—	DF	ARG	Adrián Scifo
—	FW	ARG	Ezequiel Montagna (on loan from San Lorenzo)
—	FW	ARG	Gaspar Gentile
—	GK	ARG	Josué Ayala
—	DF	ARG	Juan Sánchez Sotelo
—	GK	ARG	Julián Lucero
—	DF	ARG	Maximiliano Lugo (on loan from Rubio Ñu)
—	MF	ARG	Rodrigo De Ciancio (on loan from San Lorenzo)
—	MF	ARG	Sebastián Martelli
—	MF	PAR	Williams Riveros (on loan from Flandria)

=== Out on loan ===
Note: Flags indicate national team as defined under FIFA eligibility rules; some limited exceptions apply. Players may hold more than one non-FIFA nationality.

No.	Pos.	Nation	Player
4	DF	ARG	Christian Chimino (at Huracán until 30 June 2018)
16	FW	ARM	Mauro Guevgeozián (at Newell's Old Boys until 30 June 2018)

== Transfers ==
=== In ===
Date	Pos.	Name	From	Fee
2 July 2017	GK	(Argentina) Josué Ayala	(Argentina) Atlético Tucumán	Undisclosed
12 July 2017	GK	(Argentina) Julián Lucero	(Argentina) Juventud Unida Universitario	Undisclosed
16 July 2017	DF	(Argentina) Adrián Scifo	(Argentina) Sarmiento	Undisclosed
18 July 2017	DF	(Argentina) Juan Sánchez Sotelo	(Argentina) Arsenal de Sarandí	Undisclosed
27 July 2017	FW	(Argentina) Gaspar Gentile	(Argentina) Ferro Carril Oeste	Undisclosed
31 July 2017	MF	(Argentina) Sebastián Martelli	(Argentina) Vélez Sarsfield	Undisclosed

=== Out ===
Date	Pos.	Name	To	Fee
1 July 2017	FW	(Argentina) Luis López	(Argentina) Tristán Suárez	Undisclosed
5 July 2017	MF	(Argentina) Daniel González	(Argentina) Defensa y Justicia	Undisclosed
11 July 2017	DF	(Argentina) Gastón Bojanich	(Argentina) Tigre	Undisclosed
14 July 2017	MF	(Argentina) Abel Peralta	(Argentina) Patronato	Undisclosed
16 July 2017	FW	(Argentina) Luciano Vázquez	(Qatar) Al-Shahania	Undisclosed
20 July 2017	DF	(Argentina) Lucas Mancinelli	(Argentina) Olimpo	Undisclosed
21 July 2017	GK	(Argentina) Nicolás Fabián Rodríguez	(Argentina) Fénix	Undisclosed
28 July 2017	DF	(Argentina) Leandro Sapetti	(Argentina) Villa Dálmine	Undisclosed

=== Loan in ===
Date from	Date to	Pos.	Name	From
16 July 2017	30 June 2018	DF	(Argentina) Maximiliano Lugo	(Paraguay) Rubio Ñu
22 July 2017	31 December 2017	FW	(Argentina) Ezequiel Montagna	(Argentina) San Lorenzo
27 July 2017	30 June 2018	MF	(Argentina) Rodrigo De Ciancio	(Argentina) San Lorenzo
27 July 2017	30 June 2018	MF	(Paraguay) Williams Riveros	(Argentina) Flandria

=== Loan out ===
Date from	Date to	Pos.	Name	To
6 July 2017	30 June 2018	FW	(Armenia) Mauro Guevgeozián	(Argentina) Newell's Old Boys
12 July 2017	30 June 2018	DF	(Argentina) Christian Chimino	(Argentina) Huracán

== Friendlies ==
=== Pre-season ===
Win Draw Loss

28 July 2017 Friendly	Temperley (Argentina)	1–0	(Argentina) Dock Sud	Turdera, Argentina
09:00	S. Martelli	Report

2 August 2017 Friendly	Belgrano (Argentina)	2–1	(Argentina) Temperley	Córdoba, Argentina
09:00	(o.g.); M. Suárez	Report	F. Sosa 4'	Stadium: Villa Esquiú Academy

2 August 2017 Friendly	Belgrano (Argentina)	3–0	(Argentina) Temperley	Córdoba, Argentina
10:30	T. Attis; E. Espíndola; F. Brener	Report		Stadium: Villa Esquiú Academy

8 August 2017 Friendly	Vélez Sarsfield (Argentina)	–	(Argentina) Temperley
		Report

== Primera División ==
=== League table ===
Pos	Team	Pld	W	D	L	GF	GA	GD	Pts
23	Gimnasia y Esgrima (LP)	27	7	6	14	28	43	−15	27
24	Tigre	27	4	12	11	26	33	−7	24
25	Temperley	27	5	8	14	22	46	−24	23
26	Chacarita Juniors	27	4	6	17	23	40	−17	18
27	Arsenal	27	3	8	16	19	36	−17	17

Source: AFA
Rules for classification: 1) points; 2) play-off (only if needed to decide championship); 3) goal difference; 4) goals scored; 5) head-to-head points; 6) head-to-head goal difference; 7) head-to-head goals scored.

=== Results by matchday ===
Matchday	1	2	3	4	5	6	7	8	9	10	11	12	13	14	15	16	17	18	19	20	21	22	23	24	25	26	27
Ground	H	A	H	A	H	A	H	H	A	H	A	H	A														
Result	L	L	D	W	L	L	L	L	D	W	D	W															
Position	23	28	24	22	23	23	25	28	28	25	25	23															

Updated to match(es) played on 12 December 2017. Source: Soccerway
A = Away; H = Home; W = Win; D = Draw; L = Loss

27 August 2017 1	Temperley (Argentina)	0–1	(Argentina) River Plate	Turdera, Argentina
20:05		Report	I. Scocco 32'	Stadium: Estadio Alfredo Beranger; Referee: Fernando Rapallini (Argentina)

9 September 2017 2	Racing Club (Argentina)	4–1	(Argentina) Temperley	Avellaneda, Argentina
20:05	E. Triverio 45+2'; M. Zaracho 65'; S. Vittor 73'; A. Ibargüen 86'	Report	R. Costa 81'	Stadium: Estadio Presidente Juan Domingo Perón; Referee: Silvio Trucco (Argentina)

18 September 2017 3	Temperley (Argentina)	1–1	(Argentina) Rosario Central	Turdera, Argentina
21:05	M. Villasanti 56'	Report	F. Zampedri 22'	Stadium: Estadio Alfredo Beranger; Referee: Diego Abal (Argentina)

23 September 2017 4	Arsenal de Sarandí (Argentina)	0–1	(Argentina) Temperley	Avellaneda, Argentina
14:05		Report	R. Costa 40'	Stadium: Estadio Julio Humberto Grondona; Referee: Andrés Merlos (Argentina)

30 September 2017 5	Temperley (Argentina)	0–3	(Argentina) Estudiantes	Turdera, Argentina
16:05		Report	J. Otero 2'; P. Lugüercio 4'; G. Fernández 17'	Stadium: Estadio Alfredo Beranger; Referee: Fernando Echenique (Argentina)

14 October 2017 6	Colón (Argentina)	2–0	(Argentina) Temperley	Santa Fe, Argentina
14:05	N. Leguizamón 29'; M. Estigarribia 90+3'	Report		Stadium: Estadio Brigadier General Estanislao López; Referee: Hernán Mastrángelo (Argentina)

29 October 2017 7	Temperley (Argentina)	0–2	(Argentina) San Lorenzo	Turdera, Argentina
16:05		Report	G. Gudiño 13'; E. Cerutti 77'	Stadium: Estadio Alfredo Beranger; Referee: Mauro Vigliano (Argentina)

5 November 2017 8	Temperley (Argentina)	1–4	(Argentina) Defensa y Justicia	Turdera, Argentina
11:05	A. Arregui 79' (pen.)	Report	F. Márquez 17'; N. Fernández 22', 26'; L. Martínez 52'	Stadium: Estadio Alfredo Beranger; Referee: Darío Herrera (Argentina)

18 November 2017 9	Banfield (Argentina)	0–0	(Argentina) Temperley	Banfield, Argentina
17:00		Report		Stadium: Estadio Florencio Sola; Referee: Hernán Mastrángelo (Argentina)

27 November 2017 10	Temperley (Argentina)	1–0	(Argentina) San Martín	Turdera, Argentina
21:30	A. Arregui 4'	Report		Stadium: Estadio Alfredo Beranger; Referee: Diego Abal (Argentina)

2 December 2017 11	Argentinos Juniors (Argentina)	2–2	(Argentina) Temperley	Buenos Aires, Argentina
17:00	L. Pisculichi 67'; N. González 75'	Report	J. Sánchez Sotelo 20'; R. De Ciancio 85'	Stadium: Estadio Diego Armando Maradona; Referee: Darío Herrera (Argentina)

8 December 2017 12	Temperley (Argentina)	2–1	(Argentina) Tigre	Turdera, Argentina
17:00	A. Arregui 14'; J. Sánchez Sotelo 40' (pen.)	Report	L. Menossi 7'	Stadium: Estadio Alfredo Beranger; Referee: Juan Pompei (Argentina)

January 2018 13	Atlético Tucumán (Argentina)	–	(Argentina) Temperley	San Miguel de Tucumán, Argentina
		Report		Stadium: Estadio Monumental José Fierro

== Copa Argentina ==
Win Draw Loss

21 August 2017 R32	Temperley (Argentina)	0–2	(Argentina) Defensa y Justicia	Avellaneda, Argentina
18:00		Report	C. Rius 34'; M. Sosa 80'	Stadium: Estadio Presidente Juan Domingo Perón; Referee: Juan Pompei (Argentina)
