= 2017–18 San Lorenzo de Almagro season =

San Lorenzo de Almagro
2017–18 season
- Chairman: Matías Lammens
- Manager: Diego Aguirre (until 22 September 2017); Claudio Biaggio (int.) (from 22 September 2017 to 6 December 2017); Claudio Biaggio (from 7 December 2017)
- Stadium: Estadio Pedro Bidegain
- Primera División: 2nd
- 2016–17 Copa Argentina: Round of 32
- 2017–18 Copa Argentina: Round of 64
- Copa Libertadores: Quarter-finals
- Copa Sudamericana: First stage
- Top goalscorer: League: Nicolás Blandi (8); All: Nicolás Blandi (8)
Home colours	Away colours

The 2017–18 season is San Lorenzo de Almagro's 33rd consecutive season in the top-flight of Argentine football. The season covers the period from 1 July 2017 to 30 June 2018.

== Current squad ==
As of 20 August 2017.

Note: Flags indicate national team as defined under FIFA eligibility rules; some limited exceptions apply. Players may hold more than one non-FIFA nationality.

No.	Pos.	Nation	Player
2	DF	ARG	Marcos Angeleri
3	DF	ARG	Marcos Senesi
4	DF	ARG	Gonzalo Rodríguez
5	MF	ARG	Juan Mercier
6	DF	ARG	Matías Caruzzo
7	MF	ARG	Franco Mussis
8	MF	ARG	Gabriel Gudiño
9	FW	ARG	Nicolás Blandi
10	MF	ARG	Leandro Romagnoli
11	FW	ARG	Ezequiel Cerutti
12	GK	ARG	Sebastián Torrico
14	MF	ARG	Alexis Castro
15	FW	ARG	Nicolás Reniero
16	MF	ARG	Fernando Belluschi
17	DF	CHI	Paulo Díaz
19	MF	ARG	Rubén Botta
22	GK	ARG	Nicolás Navarro
23	FW	ARG	Germán Berterame
25	GK	ARG	José Devecchi

No.	Pos.	Nation	Player
26	MF	PAR	Robert Piris Da Motta
27	DF	ARG	Gabriel Rojas
28	MF	ARG	Nahuel Barrios
29	DF	ARG	Víctor Salazar
31	MF	ARG	Facundo Quignon
32	DF	ARG	Fabricio Coloccini
33	DF	ARG	Nicolás Zalazar
34	MF	ARG	Franco Moyano
35	FW	ARG	Tomás Conechny
36	MF	ARG	Bautista Merlini
37	GK	ARG	Franco Carretero
—	MF	ARG	Juan Ignacio Cavallaro
—	MF	ARG	Fernando Elizari
—	MF	ARG	Daniel Ibáñez
—	MF	ARG	Robertino Insúa
—	MF	ARG	Leandro Navarro
—	FW	ARG	Alexis Domínguez
—	FW	ARG	Mauro Matos

=== Out on loan ===
Note: Flags indicate national team as defined under FIFA eligibility rules; some limited exceptions apply. Players may hold more than one non-FIFA nationality.

No.	Pos.	Nation	Player
—	DF	ARG	Tomás Cardona (at Godoy Cruz until 30 June 2018)
—	DF	ARG	Santiago López (at Patronato until 30 June 2018)
—	DF	ARG	Brian Mieres (at Almagro until 30 June 2018)
13	DF	ARG	Lautaro Montoya (at Chacarita Juniors until 30 June 2018)
—	DF	ARG	Rodrigo Tapia (at Palestino until 30 June 2018)
—	MF	ARG	Brian Benítez (at Defensores de Belgrano until 30 June 2018)
—	MF	ARG	Santiago Camacho (at Independiente Rivadavia until 30 June 2018)
24	MF	ARG	Rodrigo De Ciancio (at Temperley until 30 June 2018)
—	MF	ARG	Gonzalo Jaque (at Defensores de Belgrano until 30 June 2018)

No.	Pos.	Nation	Player
—	MF	ARG	Alejandro Melo (at Atlético Tucumán until 30 June 2018)
—	MF	ARG	Franco Negri (at Independiente Rivadavia until 30 June 2018)
30	MF	ARG	Emiliano Purita (at Arsenal de Sarandí until 30 June 2018)
—	FW	ARG	Ezequiel Ávila (at Huesca until 30 June 2018)
—	FW	ARG	Rodrigo Contreras (at Arsenal de Sarandí until 30 June 2018)
—	FW	ARG	Gabriel Esparza (at Puebla until 31 December 2017)
—	FW	ARG	Ezequiel Montagna (at Temperley until 31 December 2017)
—	FW	ARG	Felix Villacorta (at Defensores de Belgrano until 30 June 2018)

== Transfers ==
=== In ===
Date	Pos.	Name	From	Fee
1 July 2017	DF	(Argentina) Víctor Salazar	(Argentina) Rosario Central	Undisclosed
9 July 2017	DF	(Argentina) Gonzalo Rodríguez	(Italy) Fiorentina	Undisclosed
10 July 2017	MF	(Argentina) Alexis Castro	(Argentina) Tigre	Undisclosed
17 July 2017	MF	(Argentina) Gabriel Gudiño	(Argentina) Atlético de Rafaela	Undisclosed

=== Out ===
Date	Pos.	Name	To	Fee
1 July 2017	MF	(Argentina) Federico Bruno	(Argentina) Bragado	Undisclosed
1 July 2017	DF	(Argentina) Rodrigo Tapia	(Chile) Palestino	Undisclosed
11 July 2017	FW	(Argentina) Gonzalo Bergessio	(Argentina) Vélez Sarsfield	Undisclosed
17 July 2017	DF	(Argentina) Gonzalo Prósperi	(Argentina) San Martín	Undisclosed
20 July 2017	MF	(Paraguay) Néstor Ortigoza	(Paraguay) Olimpia	Undisclosed
1 August 2017	DF	(Uruguay) Mathías Corujo	(Uruguay) Peñarol	Undisclosed

=== Loan out ===
Date from	Date to	Pos.	Name	To
1 July 2017	30 June 2018	FW	(Argentina) Rodrigo Contreras	(Argentina) Arsenal de Sarandí
6 July 2017	30 June 2018	DF	(Argentina) Alejandro Melo	(Argentina) Atlético Tucumán
22 July 2017	31 December 2017	FW	(Argentina) Ezequiel Montagna	(Argentina) Temperley
25 July 2017	30 June 2018	DF	(Argentina) Tomás Cardona	(Argentina) Godoy Cruz
27 July 2017	30 June 2018	MF	(Argentina) Rodrigo De Ciancio	(Argentina) Temperley

== Friendlies ==
=== Pre-season ===
Win Draw Loss

29 July 2017 Friendly	San Lorenzo (Argentina)	2–0	(Uruguay) Montevideo Wanderers	Buenos Aires, Argentina
	N. Blandi 16' (pen.), 58' (pen.)	Report		Stadium: San Lorenzo Ciudad Deportiva

29 July 2017 Friendly	San Lorenzo (Argentina)	0–0	(Uruguay) Montevideo Wanderers	Buenos Aires, Argentina
		Report		Stadium: San Lorenzo Ciudad Deportiva

2 August 2017 Friendly	San Lorenzo (Argentina)	1–0	(Argentina) Godoy Cruz	Buenos Aires, Argentina
09:30	N. Reniero 19'	Report		Stadium: San Lorenzo Ciudad Deportiva

5 August 2017 Friendly	San Lorenzo (Argentina)	3–0	(Uruguay) Peñarol	Buenos Aires, Argentina
13:00	N. Reniero 77', 88'; G. Gudiño 85'	Report		Stadium: Estadio Pedro Bidegain

== Primera División ==
=== League table ===
Pos	Team	Pld	W	D	L	GF	GA	GD	Pts	Qualification
1	Boca Juniors (C)	27	18	4	5	50	22	+28	58	Qualification for Copa Libertadores group stage
2	Godoy Cruz	27	17	5	5	45	24	+21	56	Qualification for Copa Libertadores group stage
3	San Lorenzo	27	14	8	5	31	20	+11	50	Qualification for Copa Libertadores group stage
4	Huracán	27	13	9	5	35	24	+11	48	Qualification for Copa Libertadores group stage
5	Talleres (C)	27	13	7	7	33	20	+13	46	Qualification for Copa Libertadores second stage

Source: AFA
Rules for classification: 1) points; 2) play-off (only if needed to decide championship); 3) goal difference; 4) goals scored; 5) head-to-head points; 6) head-to-head goal difference; 7) head-to-head goals scored.
(C) Champions

=== Results by matchday ===
Matchday	1	2	3	4	5	6	7	8	9	10	11	12	13	14	15	16	17	18	19	20	21	22	23	24	25	26	27
Ground	H	A	H	A	H	H	A	H	A	H	H	A	A														
Result	D	D	W	W	D	W	W	L	W	W	W	W															
Position	16	19	10	6	7	3	2	4	2	2	2	2															

Updated to match(es) played on 12 December 2017. Source: Soccerway
A = Away; H = Home; W = Win; D = Draw; L = Loss

27 August 2017 1	San Lorenzo (Argentina)	1–1	(Argentina) Racing Club	Buenos Aires, Argentina
16:05	E. Cerutti 52'	Report	L. López 13'	Stadium: Estadio Pedro Bidegain; Referee: Fernando Echenique (Argentina)

10 September 2017 2	Rosario Central (Argentina)	0–0	(Argentina) San Lorenzo	Rosario, Argentina
16:05		Report		Stadium: Estadio Gigante de Arroyito; Referee: Patricio Loustau (Argentina)

16 September 2017 3	San Lorenzo (Argentina)	1–0	(Argentina) Arsenal de Sarandí	Buenos Aires, Argentina
18:05	M. Senesi 75'	Report		Stadium: Estadio Pedro Bidegain; Referee: Federico Beligoy (Argentina)

25 September 2017 4	Estudiantes (Argentina)	1–3	(Argentina) San Lorenzo	La Plata, Argentina
21:05	M. Pavone 50'	Report	F. Belluschi 12', 89'; N. Blandi 80'	Stadium: Estadio Ciudad de La Plata; Referee: Ariel Penel (Argentina)

30 September 2017 5	San Lorenzo (Argentina)	0–0	(Argentina) Colón	Buenos Aires, Argentina
14:05		Report		Stadium: Estadio Pedro Bidegain; Referee: Fernando Espinoza (Argentina)

13 October 2017 6	San Lorenzo (Argentina)	3–1	(Argentina) Defensa y Justicia	Buenos Aires, Argentina
21:05	E. Cerutti 18', 66'; N. Blandi 47'	Report	N. Fernández 90'	Stadium: Estadio Pedro Bidegain; Referee: Nicolás Lamolina (Argentina)

29 October 2017 7	Temperley (Argentina)	0–2	(Argentina) San Lorenzo	Turdera, Argentina
16:05		Report	G. Gudiño 13'; E. Cerutti 77'	Stadium: Estadio Alfredo Beranger; Referee: Mauro Vigliano (Argentina)

4 November 2017 8	San Lorenzo (Argentina)	0–1	(Argentina) Banfield	Buenos Aires, Argentina
16:15		Report	P. Mouche 17'	Stadium: Estadio Pedro Bidegain; Referee: Germán Delfino (Argentina)

18 November 2017 9	San Martín (Argentina)	1–3	(Argentina) San Lorenzo	San Juan, Argentina
19:15	A. Fernández 73'	Report	N. Blandi 39', 90+3'; P. Díaz 55'	Stadium: Estadio Ingeniero Hilario Sánchez; Referee: Fernando Rapallini (Argentina)

25 November 2017 10	San Lorenzo (Argentina)	1–0	(Argentina) Argentinos Juniors	Buenos Aires, Argentina
19:15	N. Blandi 10'	Report		Stadium: Estadio Pedro Bidegain; Referee: Hernán Mastrángelo (Argentina)

30 November 2017 11	San Lorenzo (Argentina)	2–0	(Argentina) Atlético Tucumán	Buenos Aires, Argentina
19:15	N. Blandi 6'; N. Reniero 82'	Report		Stadium: Estadio Pedro Bidegain; Referee: Ariel Penel (Argentina)

3 December 2017 12	Tigre (Argentina)	1–2	(Argentina) San Lorenzo	Buenos Aires, Argentina
17:00	L. Janson 45'	Report	P. Díaz 39'; E. Cerutti 55'	Stadium: Estadio José Dellagiovanna; Referee: Fernando Echenique (Argentina)

January 2018 13	Talleres (Argentina)	–	(Argentina) San Lorenzo	Córdoba, Argentina
		Report		Stadium: Estadio Mario Alberto Kempes

== Copa Argentina ==
Win Draw Loss

15 August 2017 R64	San Lorenzo (Argentina)	1–1 (4–2 p)	(Argentina) Cipolletti	Lanús, Argentina
18:00	N. Reniero 71'	Report	J. Piñero da Silva 20'	Stadium: Estadio Ciudad de Lanús – Néstor Díaz Pérez; Referee: Andre Merlos (Argentina)
	Penalties
	N. Blandi (penalty missed); M. Caruzzo (penalty scored); G. Rodríguez (penalty scored); L. Romagnoli (penalty scored); E. Cerutti (penalty scored)		E. Vilce (penalty scored); G. Valente (penalty scored); D. Jara (penalty missed); C. Ávila (penalty missed)

20 August 2017 R32	Deportivo Morón (Argentina)	1–0	(Argentina) San Lorenzo	Lanús, Argentina
15:30	L. Guzmán 86'	Report		Stadium: Estadio Ciudad de Lanús – Néstor Díaz Pérez; Referee: Pablo Echavarría (Argentina)

== Copa Libertadores ==
Win Draw Loss

=== Round of 16 ===
7 July 2017 First leg	Emelec (Ecuador)	0–1	(Argentina) San Lorenzo	Guayaquil, Ecuador
21:45		Report	F. Belluschi 24'	Stadium: Estadio George Capwell; Referee: Wilson Lamouroux (Colombia)

10 August 2017 Second leg	San Lorenzo (Argentina)	0–1 (agg: 1–1) (a.e.t.) (5–4 p)	(Ecuador) Emelec	Buenos Aires, Argentina
21:45		Report	O. Lastra 47'	Stadium: Estadio Pedro Bidegain; Referee: Wilton Sampaio (Brazil)
	Penalties
	N. Blandi (penalty scored); M. Caruzzo (penalty scored); M. Angeleri (penalty scored); G. Gudiño (penalty scored); F. Belluschi (penalty missed); N. Reniero (penalty scored)		F. Gaibor (penalty scored); A. Preciado (penalty scored); F. Luna (penalty missed); S. Píriz (penalty scored); R. Caicedo (penalty scored); C. Ramos (penalty missed)

=== Quarter-finals ===
13 September 2017 First leg	San Lorenzo (Argentina)	2–0	(Argentina) Lanús	Buenos Aires, Argentina
19:15	N. Blandi 34', 51' (pen.)	Report		Stadium: Estadio Pedro Bidegain; Referee: Wilmar Roldán (Colombia)

21 September 2017 Second leg	Lanús (Argentina)	2–0 (agg: 2–2) (4–3 p)	(Argentina) San Lorenzo	Lanús, Argentina
21:45	J. Sand 11'; N. Pasquini 16'	Report		Stadium: Estadio Ciudad de Lanús – Néstor Díaz Pérez; Referee: Enrique Cáceres (Paraguay)
	Penalties
	A. Silva (penalty scored); N. Pasquini (penalty scored); D. Braghieri (penalty scored); L. Acosta (penalty scored)		F. Belluschi (penalty scored); M. Caruzzo (penalty missed); G. Rodríguez (penalty scored); R. Botta (penalty scored); N. Blandi (penalty missed)

== Copa Sudamericana ==
Win Draw Loss

–
