= Pitton (disambiguation) =

Pitton may refer to:

== People ==
- Bruno Pittón (born 1993), Argentine professional footballer
- Joseph Pitton de Tournefort (1656–1708), French botanist
- Mauro Pittón (born 1994), Argentine professional footballer
- Scholastique Pitton (1621–1689), French writer and historian

== Places ==
- Pitton, a village in Wiltshire, England
- Pitton, Swansea, village in the Gower Peninsula, Wales
