= Nicolás Rodríguez =

Nicolás Rodríguez may refer to:

- Nicolás Rodríguez (actor), Mexican film actor
- Nicolás Rodríguez (sailor) (born 1991), Spanish sailor
- Nicolás Rodríguez Carrasco (1890-1940), Mexican general
- Nicolás Rodríguez Peña (1775-1853), Argentine politician
- Nicolás Rodríguez (footballer, born 1991), Uruguayan football right-back
- Nicolás Rodríguez (footballer, born 1993), Argentine football goalkeeper
- Nicolás Rodríguez (footballer, born 2004), Colombian football winger
