= Rodrigo Córdoba =

Argentine footballer

Personal information
- Full name: Rodrigo Córdoba
- Date of birth: 25 March 1995 (age 31)
- Place of birth: Argentina
- Position: Midfielder

Team information
- Current team: Temperley

Senior career*
Years	Team	Apps	(Gls)
2016–	Temperley	0	(0)
- * Club domestic league appearances and goals as of 14:53, 24 May 2018 (UTC)

Rodrigo Córdoba (born 25 March 1995) is an Argentine professional footballer who plays as a midfielder for Argentine Primera División side Temperley.

== Career ==
Córdoba's opening club of his career was Temperley. He made his career debut on 10 May 2016 during a Copa Argentina encounter with Estudiantes of Primera B Nacional, participating for the full duration of a home defeat. He was subsequently selected as a substitute for Argentine Primera División matches against Newell's Old Boys, Racing Club and Belgrano during 2016 but went unused on all three occasions.

== Career statistics ==
As of 24 May 2018.

Club statistics
Club	Season	League			Cup (Note: Includes the Copa Argentina)		League Cup		Continental		Other		Total	
Club	Season	Division	Apps	Goals	Apps	Goals	Apps	Goals	Apps	Goals	Apps	Goals	Apps	Goals
Temperley	2016	Primera División	0	0	1	0	—		—		0	0	1	0
Temperley	2016–17	Primera División	0	0	0	0	—		—		0	0	0	0
Temperley	2017–18	Primera División	0	0	0	0	—		—		0	0	0	0
Career total			0	0	1	0	—		—		0	0	1	0
