= José Vivanco =

Argentine footballer

Personal information
- Full name: José Vivanco
- Date of birth: 22 February 1998 (age 28)
- Place of birth: Viedma, Argentina
- Height: 1.83 m (6 ft 0 in)
- Position: Centre-back

Team information
- Current team: Ierapetra
- Number: 45

Youth career
- Jorge Newbery de Patagones
- River Plate
- 2018: San Lorenzo

Senior career*
Years	Team	Apps	(Gls)
2018–2020	San Lorenzo	1	(0)
2020–2021	Temperley	13	(1)
2022–	Ierapetra	9	(0)
- * Club domestic league appearances and goals as of 17:59, 3 August 2022 (UTC)

José Vivanco (born 22 February 1998) is an Argentine professional footballer who plays as a centre-back for Ierapetra.

== Career ==
Vivanco's career began in the youth system of Jorge Newbery de Patagones, prior to spells with River Plate and, in 2018, San Lorenzo. He first appeared in Jorge Almirón's first-team in the following December, when he was selected as a substitute for an Argentine Primera División draw away to Aldosivi; he was subbed on after sixty-nine minutes for Marcelo Herrera, making his professional debut at the age of twenty.

In February 2022, Vivanco joined Greek club Ierapetra.

== Career statistics ==
As of 2 December 2018.

Club statistics
Club	Season	League			Cup (Note: Includes the Copa Argentina)		League Cup		Continental (Note: Includes the Copa Libertadores and Copa Sudamericana)		Other		Total	
Club	Season	Division	Apps	Goals	Apps	Goals	Apps	Goals	Apps	Goals	Apps	Goals	Apps	Goals
San Lorenzo	2018–19	Primera División	1	0	0	0	—		0	0	0	0	1	0
Career total			1	0	0	0	—		0	0	0	0	1	0
