= Gerónimo Poblete =

Argentine footballer

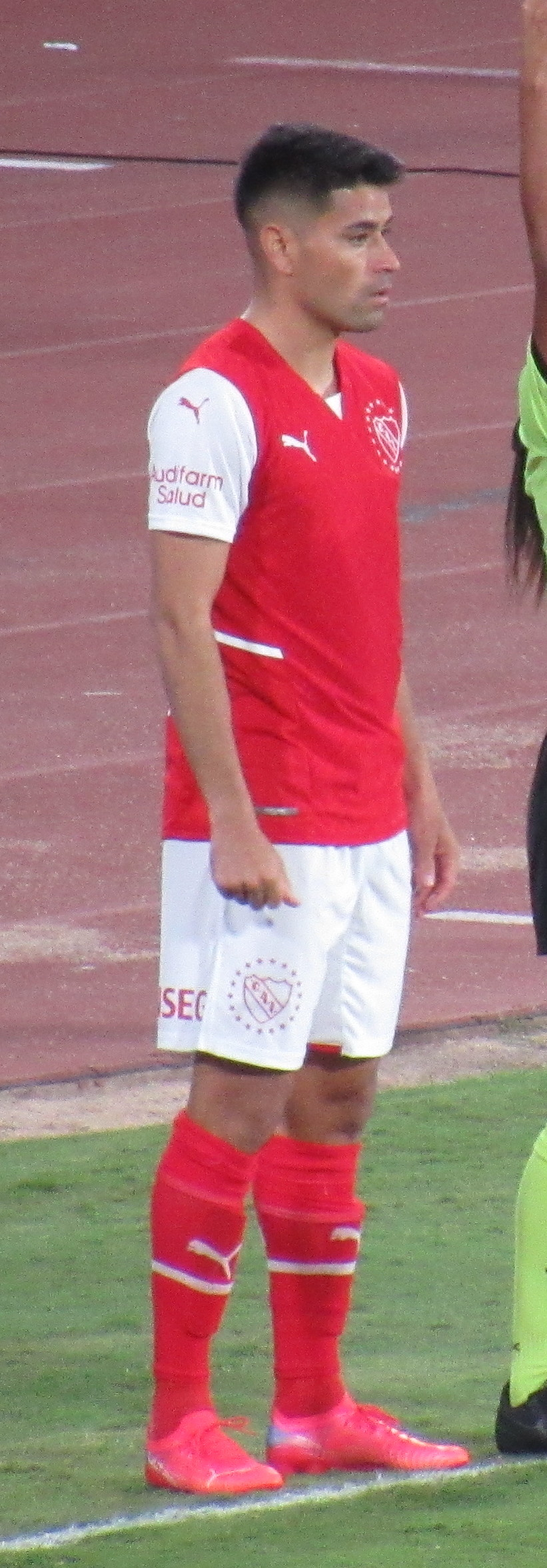
- Poblete with Independiente in 2022

Personal information
- Full name: Gerónimo Gastón Poblete
- Date of birth: 2 January 1993 (age 33)
- Place of birth: Tupungato, Argentina
- Height: 1.74 m (5 ft 9 in)
- Position: Defensive midfielder

Youth career
- Colón

Senior career*
Years	Team	Apps	(Gls)
2011–2017	Colón	102	(2)
2017–2020	Metz	26	(0)
2018–2019	→ San Lorenzo (loan)	12	(0)
2019–2020	→ San Lorenzo (loan)	19	(0)
2020	Metz II	2	(0)
2020–2021	Deportes La Serena	16	(0)
2021	Vélez Sarsfield	26	(0)
2022	Metalist Kharkiv	0	(0)
2022	→ Independiente (loan)	7	(0)
2022–2025	Al-Wasl	50	(0)
2025–2026	Al-Sharjah	20	(1)
- * Club domestic league appearances and goals as of 05:20, 1 October 2024 (UTC)

Gerónimo Gastón Poblete (born 2 January 1993) is an Argentine professional footballer who plays as a defensive midfielder.

== Career ==
Poblete started his senior career in 2011 with Argentine Primera División side Colón, he was an unused substitute four times during the 2011–12 season. He made his professional debut on 16 February 2014 in a game against Argentinos Juniors. In his next appearance versus Argentinos Juniors, in September 2014, Poblete scored his first goal for Colón in a 0–2 win. In total, Poblete made seventy-three appearances and scored two goals in his first six seasons with Colón, twenty of those appearances and one of those goals fell during the club's 2014 season in Primera B Nacional following relegation in 2013–14 to the country's second tier.

On 4 July 2017, after one hundred and seven appearances for Colón, Poblete departed to France to join Ligue 1 club Metz. He joined on a free transfer and signed a four-year contract. Poblete's Ligue 1 debut came on 5 August versus Guingamp, he played the full match in a 1–3 defeat. On 11 August 2018, San Lorenzo loaned Poblete. Twenty-two appearances followed in 2018–19. Poblete left San Lorenzo on 30 June 2019, but returned on a fresh loan deal on 21 July. He made another twenty-two appearances. Poblete returned to Metz in June 2020, subsequently featuring twice for their reserve team in Championnat National 2.

Poblete terminated his Metz contract on 29 October, prior to returning to South America with Chilean Primera División team Deportes La Serena. He made his debut on 15 November in a home win over Huachipato, which preceded fifteen further appearances in 2020 as the club finished fifteenth; avoiding the relegation play-off due to goal difference and relegation itself by one point. On 19 February 2021, Poblete went back to his homeland with Vélez Sarsfield.

== Career statistics ==
As of match played 25 May 2025.

Appearances and goals by club, season and competition
Club	Season	League			Cup		League Cup		Continental		Other		Total	
Club	Season	Division	Apps	Goals	Apps	Goals	Apps	Goals	Apps	Goals	Apps	Goals	Apps	Goals
Colón	2011–12	Argentine Primera División	0	0	0	0	—		—		0	0	0	0
Colón	2012–13	Argentine Primera División	0	0	0	0	—		0	0	0	0	0	0
Colón	2013–14	Argentine Primera División	11	0	0	0	—		—		0	0	11	0
Colón	2014	Primera B Nacional	20	1	2	0	—		—		0	0	22	1
Colón	2015	Argentine Primera División	28	0	1	0	—		—		0	0	29	0
Colón	2016	Argentine Primera División	14	1	1	0	—		—		0	0	15	1
Colón	2016–17	Argentine Primera División	29	0	1	0	—		—		0	0	30	0
Colón	Total		102	2	5	0	—		0	0	0	0	107	2
Metz	2017–18	Ligue 1	25	0	2	0	2	0	—		0	0	29	0
Metz	2018–19	Ligue 2	1	0	0	0	0	0	—		0	0	0	0
Metz	Total		26	0	2	0	2	0	—		0	0	30	0
San Lorenzo (loan)	2018–19	Argentine Primera División	12	0	2	0	1	0	7 (Note: Appearance(s) in the Copa Libertadores and Copa Sudamericana)	0	0	0	22	0
San Lorenzo (loan)	2019–20	Argentine Primera División	19	0	0	0	1	0	2 (Note: Appearance(s) in the Copa Libertadores)	0	0	0	22	0
San Lorenzo (loan)	Total		31	0	2	0	2	0	9	0	0	0	44	0
Metz II	2020–21	National 2	2	0	—		—		—		—		2	0
Deportes La Serena	2020	Chilean Primera División	16	0	0	0	—		—		—		16	0
Vélez Sarsfield	2021	Argentine Primera División	26	0	0	0	—		4	0	—		30	0
Independiente (loan)	2022	Argentine Primera División	7	0	2	0	—		1	0	—		10	0
Al Wasl	2022–23	UAE Pro League	22	0	4	0	1	0	—		—		27	0
Al Wasl	2023–24	UAE Pro League	15	0	3	0	5	0	—		—		23	0
Al Wasl	2024–25	UAE Pro League	13	0	2	0	2	0	3	0	—		20	0
Al Wasl	Total		50	0	9	0	8	0	3	0	—		70	0
Career total			260	2	20	0	12	0	17	0	0	0	309	2
