= Ezequiel Montagna =

Argentine footballer

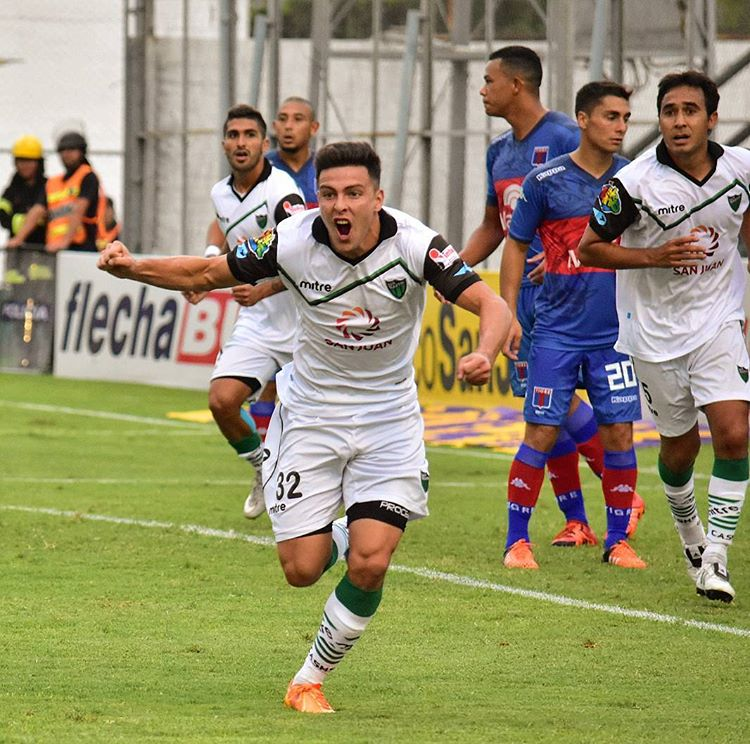

Personal information
- Full name: Ezequiel Montagna
- Date of birth: 8 June 1994 (age 32)
- Place of birth: Mar del Plata, Argentina
- Height: 1.80 m (5 ft 11 in)
- Position: Winger

Team information
- Current team: Deportivo Madryn

Youth career
- 2010–2016: San Lorenzo

Senior career*
Years	Team	Apps	(Gls)
2016–2018	San Lorenzo	0	(0)
2016–2017	→ San Martín (loan)	34	(4)
2017–2018	→ Temperley (loan)	18	(2)
2018–2019	Atlético de Rafaela	12	(0)
2019–2020	Tigre	1	(0)
2020	Norrby	24	(1)
2021–2023	Dalkurd	59	(11)
2023	Trollhättan	10	(2)
2024–2025	San Martín SJ	30	(3)
2025–	Deportivo Madryn	29	(1)
- * Club domestic league appearances and goals as of 16:58, 27 April 2026 (UTC)

Ezequiel Montagna (born 8 June 1994) is an Argentine professional footballer who plays as a winger for Deportivo Madryn.

== Career ==
San Lorenzo signed Montagna in 2010. On 9 January 2016, San Martín borrowed Montagna for the 2016 and 2016–17 seasons. He made his professional debut on 6 February during a win over Newell's Old Boys, before scoring for the first time in a 1–0 victory versus Tigre on 12 March. He ended the 2016 campaign with two goals in twelve appearances, prior to scoring two in twenty-four during 2016–17; both goals coming against parent club San Lorenzo in August 2016. He returned to San Lorenzo in June 2017, but was immediately loaned back out to play for Temperley. One goal in eighteen fixtures followed.

On 16 August 2018, Montagna joined Primera B Nacional's Atlético de Rafaela. In July 2019, Montagna headed across the division to sign with Tigre. He made his debut on 5 November against Deportivo Riestra, replacing Matías Pérez Acuña as a second-half substitute. That was his only appearance for Tigre, with the midfielder subsequently departing in January 2020 to join Swedish Superettan side Norrby IF; penning a three-year contract. He made his bow off the bench against Östers IF on 17 June, before making his first start days later versus GAIS. He scored once for them, netting against Västerås SK on 25 July.

On 1 February 2021, Montagna moved across the Superettan to Dalkurd FF; penning a three-year contract.

On 2 August 2023, after two seasons at Dalkurd FF, Montagna moved to Ettan-Södra side Trollhättan.

== Career statistics ==
As of 1 February 2021.

Club statistics
Club	Season	League			Cup		League Cup		Continental		Other		Total	
Club	Season	Division	Apps	Goals	Apps	Goals	Apps	Goals	Apps	Goals	Apps	Goals	Apps	Goals
San Lorenzo	2016	Primera División	0	0	0	0	—		0	0	0	0	0	0
San Lorenzo	2016–17	Primera División	0	0	0	0	—		0	0	0	0	0	0
San Lorenzo	2017–18	Primera División	0	0	0	0	—		0	0	0	0	0	0
San Lorenzo	Total		0	0	0	0	—		0	0	0	0	0	0
San Martín (loan)	2016	Primera División	11	2	1	0	—		—		0	0	12	2
San Martín (loan)	2016–17	Primera División	23	2	1	0	—		—		0	0	24	2
San Martín (loan)	Total		34	4	2	0	—		—		0	0	36	4
Temperley (loan)	2017–18	Primera División	18	2	1	0	—		—		0	0	19	2
Atlético de Rafaela	2018–19	Primera B Nacional	12	0	2	0	—		—		0	0	14	0
Tigre	2019–20	Primera B Nacional	1	0	0	0	—		—		0	0	1	0
Norrby	2020	Superettan	24	1	1	0	—		—		0	0	25	1
Dalkurd	2021	Ettan Fotboll	0	0	0	0	—		—		0	0	0	0
Career total			89	7	6	0	—		0	0	0	0	95	7
