= Santiago Camacho =

Argentine professional footballer

Personal information
- Full name: Santiago Gabriel Camacho
- Date of birth: 25 January 1997 (age 29)
- Place of birth: Buenos Aires, Argentina
- Height: 1.83 m (6 ft 0 in)
- Position: Midfielder

Team information
- Current team: Estudiantes BA

Youth career
- Club González Catán
- 2004–2017: San Lorenzo

Senior career*
Years	Team	Apps	(Gls)
2017–2018	San Lorenzo	0	(0)
2017–2018	→ Independiente Rivadavia (loan)	3	(0)
2019	River Plate	2	(0)
2019–2020	Fénix	25	(2)
2020–2021	Colegiales	43	(12)
2022–	Estudiantes BA	15	(0)
2022–2023	→ Deportes Temuco (loan)	34	(4)
2024	→ Colegiales (loan)	21	(3)
2025	→ Gimnasia Jujuy (loan)	31	(5)
- * Club domestic league appearances and goals as of 16:07, 28 April 2026 (UTC)

Santiago Gabriel Camacho (born 25 January 1997) is an Argentine professional footballer who plays as a midfielder for Estudiantes BA.

== Career ==
San Lorenzo signed Camacho to their youth system in 2004 from Club González Catán. His first-team career got underway in 2017. He joined Independiente Rivadavia in Primera B Nacional on loan in September 2017, making the first of three appearances during 2017–18 against Ferro Carril Oeste on 24 November.

== Career statistics ==
As of 5 September 2018.

Club statistics
Club	Season	League			Cup (Note: Includes the Copa Argentina)		League Cup		Continental (Note: Includes the Copa Libertadores and Copa Sudamericana)		Other		Total	
Club	Season	Division	Apps	Goals	Apps	Goals	Apps	Goals	Apps	Goals	Apps	Goals	Apps	Goals
San Lorenzo	2017–18	Primera División	0	0	0	0	—		0	0	0	0	0	0
San Lorenzo	2018–19	Primera División	0	0	0	0	—		0	0	0	0	0	0
San Lorenzo	Total		0	0	0	0	—		0	0	0	0	0	0
Independiente Rivadavia (loan)	2017–18	Primera B Nacional	3	0	0	0	—		—		0	0	3	0
Career total			3	0	0	0	—		0	0	0	0	3	0
