= Maximiliano Lugo =

Argentine-Paraguayan footballer

Personal information
- Full name: Maximiliano Francisco Lugo
- Date of birth: 4 December 1989 (age 36)
- Place of birth: Lanús, Argentina
- Height: 1.70 m (5 ft 7 in)
- Position: Midfielder

Youth career
- Lanús

Senior career*
Years	Team	Apps	(Gls)
2009–2012	Lanús	27	(0)
2011–2012	→ Atlanta (loan)	10	(0)
2012	→ Unión Santa Fe (loan)	6	(0)
2013	Unión Mar del Plata	5	(0)
2013–2018	Rubio Ñu	76	(14)
2016–2017	→ San Martín SJ (loan)	33	(0)
2017	→ Temperley (loan)	6	(0)
2018–2021	Belgrano	34	(2)
2020	→ Coquimbo Unido (loan)	2	(0)
2022	Aurora	18	(0)
- * Club domestic league appearances and goals as of 18 May 2024

Maximiliano Francisco Lugo (born 4 December 1989), known as Maxi Lugo, is an Argentine-Paraguayan professional footballer who plays as a midfielder.

== Career ==
Lugo started off his senior career with a three-year spell with local side Lanús, making the first of twenty-eight appearances on 1 March 2009 during a win away to Gimnasia y Esgrima. He was loaned out on two occasions, to Atlanta for 2011–12 and to Unión Santa Fe for 2012–13. He featured a total of sixteen times for those aforementioned clubs. On 23 January 2013, Lugo joined Unión Mar del Plata of Torneo Argentino A. Six appearances followed. Six months after signing, Lugo was on the move again as he agreed to join Paraguayan Primera División side Rubio Ñu. He scored on his sixth appearance versus Guaraní.

In his first three seasons with Rubio Ñu, Lugo scored fourteen goals in seventy-six encounters. For the 2016 and 2017 campaigns, he was loaned back to the Argentine Primera División. In January 2016, San Martín temporarily signed Lugo. He returned to Rubio Ñu after the 2016–17 Argentine Primera División season, making twenty-three appearances as the club finished 22nd. To conclude 2017, Lugo had a short spell with Temperley. On 18 January 2018, Belgrano became Lugo's eighth career club. He appeared in nine fixtures for Belgrano. Lugo left Belgrano in February 2021 after his stint on loan with Coquimbo Unido.

In March 2022, 32-year old Lugo joined Bolivian Primera División side Club Aurora.

== Career statistics ==
As of 20 May 2018.

Club statistics
Club	Season	League			Cup (Note: Includes the Copa Argentina and Copa Paraguay)		League Cup		Continental (Note: Includes the Copa Libertadores and Copa Sudamericana)		Other		Total	
Club	Season	Division	Apps	Goals	Apps	Goals	Apps	Goals	Apps	Goals	Apps	Goals	Apps	Goals
Lanús	2008–09	Argentine Primera División	4	0	0	0	—		0	0	0	0	4	0
Lanús	2009–10	Argentine Primera División	16	0	0	0	—		1 (Note: One appearance in 2009 Copa Sudamericana)	0	0	0	17	0
Lanús	2010–11	Argentine Primera División	17	0	0	0	—		—		0	0	17	0
Lanús	2011–12	Argentine Primera División	0	0	0	0	—		0	0	0	0	0	0
Lanús	2012–13	Argentine Primera División	0	0	0	0	—		—		0	0	0	0
Lanús	Total		27	0	0	0	—		1	0	0	0	28	0
Atlanta (loan)	2011–12	Primera B Nacional	10	0	0	0	—		—		0	0	10	0
Unión Santa Fe (loan)	2012–13	Argentine Primera División	6	0	0	0	—		—		0	0	6	0
Unión Mar del Plata	2012–13	Torneo Argentino A	5	0	0	0	—		—		1 (Note: One appearance in 2012–13 Torneo Argentino A play-offs)	0	6	0
Rubio Ñu	2013	Paraguayan Primera División	14	3	—		—		—		0	0	14	3
Rubio Ñu	2014	Paraguayan Primera División	34	4	—		—		—		0	0	34	4
Rubio Ñu	2015	Paraguayan Primera División	28	7	—		—		—		0	0	28	7
Rubio Ñu	2016	Paraguayan Primera División	0	0	—		—		—		0	0	0	0
Rubio Ñu	2017	Paraguayan Primera División	0	0	—		—		—		0	0	0	0
Rubio Ñu	2018	División Intermedia	0	0	0	0	—		—		0	0	0	0
Rubio Ñu	Total		76	14	0	0	—		—		0	0	76	14
San Martín (loan)	2016	Argentine Primera División	10	0	0	0	—		—		0	0	10	0
San Martín (loan)	2016–17	Argentine Primera División	23	0	0	0	—		—		0	0	23	0
San Martín (loan)	Total		33	0	0	0	—		—		0	0	33	0
Temperley (loan)	2017–18	Argentine Primera División	6	0	0	0	—		—		0	0	6	0
Belgrano (loan)	2017–18	Argentine Primera División	9	0	0	0	—		—		0	0	9	0
Career total			172	14	0	0	—		1	0	1	0	174	14
