= Alexander Díaz =

Argentine footballer (born 2000)

Personal information
- Date of birth: 22 March 2000 (age 26)
- Place of birth: Nueve de Julio, Argentina
- Height: 1.72 m (5 ft 8 in)
- Position: Forward

Team information
- Current team: Deportivo Riestra
- Number: 10

Youth career
- 2007–2015: Once Tigres

Senior career*
Years	Team	Apps	(Gls)
2015	Once Tigres		
2015–2025	San Lorenzo	35	(1)
2022	→ Arsenal Sarandí (loan)	30	(3)
2023	→ Ferro Carril Oeste (loan)	28	(5)
2024	→ CRB (loan)	3	(0)
2024	→ Deportivo Riestra (loan)	15	(2)
2025–	Deportivo Riestra	55	(5)

International career
2018–	Argentina U20		
- * Club domestic league appearances and goals as of 17:38, 13 November 2026 (UTC)

Alexander Díaz (born 22 March 2000) is an Argentine professional footballer who plays as a forward for Deportivo Riestra.

== Club career ==
Díaz began his youth career with Once Tigres in 2007, remaining in their system until 2015 when he was moved into their first-team; subsequently featuring in Torneo Federal B. Later that year, San Lorenzo signed Díaz. His professional debut arrived three years later on 7 September 2018, with the midfielder being substituted on for the final seconds of a Copa Argentina match with Colón. Just over a week later, on 16 September, Díaz made his Argentine Primera División bow against Godoy Cruz. He scored his first senior goal on 14 November 2020 against Aldosivi in the Copa de la Liga Profesional.

On 25 January 2022, Díaz was loaned out to Arsenal de Sarandí until the end of the year.

== International career ==
In August 2018, Díaz was called up to play for the Argentina U20s. His first cap came on 29 August in a friendly with Uruguay.

== Career statistics ==
As of 22 March 2021.

Club statistics
Club	Season	League			Cup		League Cup		Continental		Other		Total	
Club	Season	Division	Apps	Goals	Apps	Goals	Apps	Goals	Apps	Goals	Apps	Goals	Apps	Goals
San Lorenzo	2015	Primera División	0	0	0	0	—		0	0	0	0	0	0
San Lorenzo	2016	Primera División	0	0	0	0	—		0	0	0	0	0	0
San Lorenzo	2016–17	Primera División	0	0	0	0	—		0	0	0	0	0	0
San Lorenzo	2017–18	Primera División	0	0	0	0	—		0	0	0	0	0	0
San Lorenzo	2018–19	Primera División	2	0	2	0	1	0	0	0	0	0	5	0
San Lorenzo	2019–20	Primera División	8	0	0	0	0	0	—		0	0	8	0
San Lorenzo	2020–21 (Note: Soccerway counts 2020 Copa de la Liga Profesional appearances as league appearances.)	Primera División	7	1	0	0	0	0	—		0	0	7	1
San Lorenzo	2021 (Note: Soccerway counts 2021 Copa de la Liga Profesional appearances as league appearances.)	Primera División	6	0	1	1	0	0	0	0	0	0	7	1
Career total			23	1	3	1	1	0	0	0	0	0	27	2
