= Juan Sánchez Sotelo =

Argentine footballer

Personal information
- Full name: Juan Ignacio Sánchez Sotelo
- Date of birth: October 2, 1987 (age 39)
- Place of birth: Avellaneda, Argentina
- Height: 1.80 m (5 ft 11 in)
- Position: Striker

Team information
- Current team: Güemes

Youth career
- Racing Club

Senior career*
Years	Team	Apps	(Gls)
2007–2011	Racing Club	14	(1)
2010	→ Patronato (loan)	14	(1)
2011–2012	Deportes La Serena	30	(11)
2012	Rapid București	2	(0)
2012–2013	Olimpo	34	(8)
2013–2014	Talleres	34	(8)
2014–2015	Levadiakos	13	(2)
2015–2016	Defensa y Justicia	26	(5)
2016–2017	Arsenal de Sarandí	38	(8)
2017–2018	Temperley	15	(2)
2018–2019	Nueva Chicago	24	(9)
2019–2020	Huachipato	40	(22)
2021	Palestino	22	(4)
2022	Huachipato	27	(6)
2023	Deportes La Serena	32	(17)
2024	Universidad de Concepción	28	(10)
2025	Rangers	23	(1)
2026–	Güemes	0	(0)
- * Club domestic league appearances and goals as of 15 January 2026

Juan Ignacio Sánchez Sotelo (born 2 October 1987 in Avellaneda) is an Argentine football striker who plays for Güemes.

== Career ==
In 2012, Sánchez Sotelo moved to Romania and signed with Rapid București.

In 2023, he played for Deportes La Serena in the Primera B de Chile. The next season, he switched to Universidad de Concepción.

Back to Argentina, Sánchez Sotelo joined Güemes in January 2026.
