= Nicolás Reniero =

Argentine footballer

Personal information
- Full name: Gastón Nicolás Reniero
- Date of birth: 18 March 1995 (age 31)
- Place of birth: Chajarí, Argentina
- Height: 1.83 m (6 ft 0 in)
- Position: Striker

Team information
- Current team: Lugo
- Number: 15

Youth career
- San Lorenzo

Senior career*
Years	Team	Apps	(Gls)
2016–2019	San Lorenzo	44	(8)
2016–2017	→ Almagro (loan)	15	(7)
2019–2024	Racing Club	21	(3)
2021–2022	→ Argentinos Jrs (loan)	46	(7)
2023	→ Tigre (loan)	8	(1)
2025–	Lugo	46	(11)
- * Club domestic league appearances and goals as of 9 June 2026

Gastón Nicolás Reniero (born 18 March 1995) is an Argentine professional footballer who plays as a striker for Spanish Primera Federación club Lugo.

== Career ==
San Lorenzo were Reniero's first career club. In August 2016, Reniero joined Almagro of Primera B Nacional on loan. He made his Almagro and senior career debut on 14 September during a Copa Argentina loss at home to Juventud Unida, prior to making his first professional league appearance during a goalless tie with Independiente Rivadavia three days later. On 20 September, Reniero netted his first goal in a 2–1 victory against Santamarina. In total, Reniero featured thirty-nine times in all competitions for Almagro whilst scoring fifteen goals, including a hat-trick in his penultimate match versus Atlético Paraná.

He returned to San Lorenzo ahead of the 2017–18 Argentine Primera División season and subsequently made his league bow on 27 August 2017 in a draw with Racing Club, having previously scored on his club debut for them earlier in the month during a Copa Argentina game against Cipolletti on 15 August.

== Career statistics ==
As of 6 September 2018.

Club statistics
Club	Season	League			Cup (Note: Includes the Copa Argentina)		League Cup		Continental (Note: Includes the Copa Libertadores and Copa Sudamericana)		Other		Total	
Club	Season	Division	Apps	Goals	Apps	Goals	Apps	Goals	Apps	Goals	Apps	Goals	Apps	Goals
San Lorenzo	2016–17	Primera División	0	0	0	0	—		0	0	0	0	0	0
San Lorenzo	2017–18	Primera División	21	4	2	1	—		3 (Note: Two appearances in 2017 Copa Libertadores, one appearance in 2018 Copa Sudamericana)	0	0	0	26	5
San Lorenzo	2018–19	Primera División	4	2	0	0	—		0	0	0	0	4	2
San Lorenzo	Total		25	6	2	1	—		3	0	0	0	30	7
Almagro (loan)	2016–17	Primera B Nacional	37	15	2	0	—		—		0	0	39	15
Career total			62	21	4	1	—		3	0	0	0	69	22
