= Nicolás Zalazar =

Argentine footballer

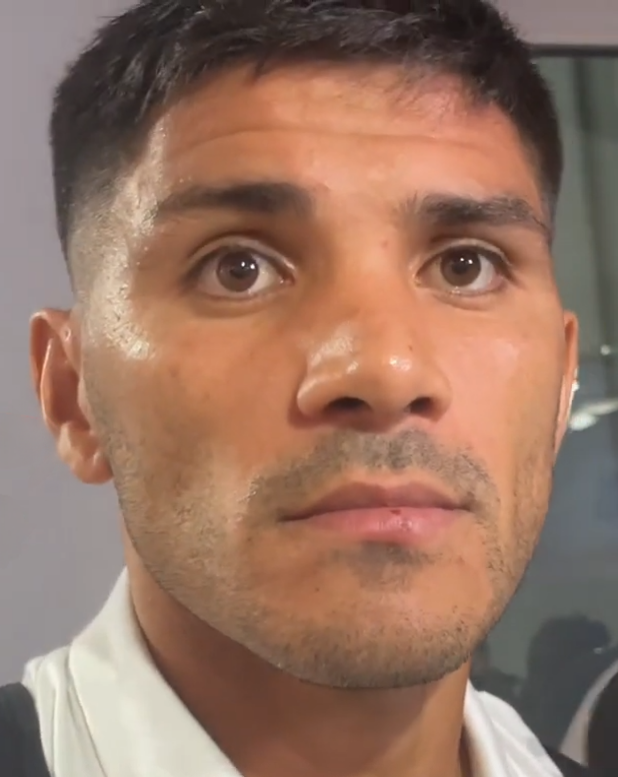
- Zalazar with Junior in 2024

Personal information
- Full name: Nicolás Mauricio Zalazar
- Date of birth: 29 January 1997 (age 29)
- Place of birth: Buenos Aires, Argentina
- Height: 1.75 m (5 ft 9 in)
- Position: Centre-back

Team information
- Current team: Aldosivi
- Number: 33

Youth career
- San Lorenzo

Senior career*
| Years | Team | Apps | (Gls) |
| 2016–2019 | San Lorenzo | 7 | (0) |
| 2018–2019 | → Atlético Rafaela (loan) | 20 | (0) |
| 2019–2020 | All Boys | 16 | (0) |
| 2020–2021 | Platense | 18 | (1) |
| 2021–2022 | Bursaspor | 24 | (2) |
| 2022–2024 | Defensa y Justicia | 7 | (0) |
| 2023 | → Ñublense (loan) | 22 | (2) |
| 2024–2025 | Junior | 14 | (0) |
| 2025–2026 | Instituto | 22 | (1) |
| 2026– | Aldosivi | 22 | (0) |

International career
| 2017 | Argentina U20 | 4 | (0) |
- * Club domestic league appearances and goals as of 17:53, 6 November 2026 (UTC)

Nicolás Mauricio Zalazar (born 29 January 1997) is an Argentine professional footballer who plays as a centre-back for Aldosivi.

== Career ==
=== Club ===
Zalazar was promoted into San Lorenzo's first-team squad under manager Diego Aguirre during the 2016–17 Argentine Primera División campaign, making his debut against Newell's Old Boys on 30 October 2016. He subsequently made four further appearances in his opening season. In July 2018, Zalazar joined Atlético de Rafaela of Primera B Nacional on loan.

=== International ===
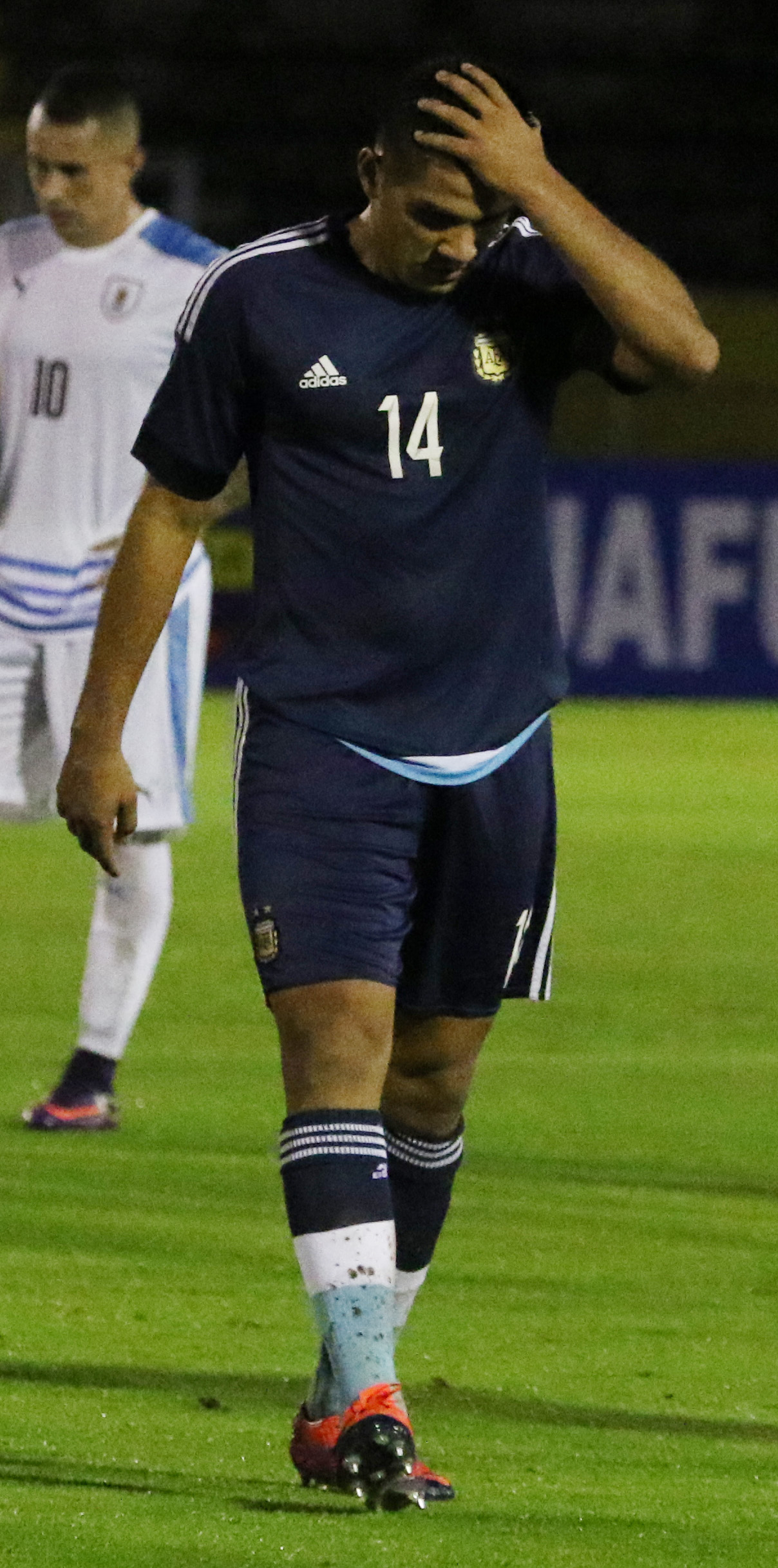
Zalazar with Argentina U20 in 2017

Zalazar won four caps for the Argentina U20 team at the 2017 South American Youth Football Championship, the first of which arrived versus eventual winners Uruguay on 21 January.

== Career statistics ==
As of 6 September 2018.

Club statistics
| Club | Season | League | | | Cup (Note: Includes the Copa Argentina) | | League Cup | | Continental (Note: Includes the Copa Libertadores and Copa Sudamericana) | | Other | | Total | |
| Club | Season | Division | Apps | Goals | Apps | Goals | Apps | Goals | Apps | Goals | Apps | Goals | Apps | Goals |
|---|---|---|---|---|---|---|---|---|---|---|---|---|---|---|
| San Lorenzo | 2016–17 | Primera División | 5 | 0 | 0 | 0 | — | | 0 | 0 | 0 | 0 | 5 | 0 |
| San Lorenzo | 2017–18 | Primera División | 2 | 0 | 0 | 0 | — | | 0 | 0 | 0 | 0 | 2 | 0 |
| San Lorenzo | 2018–19 | Primera División | 0 | 0 | 0 | 0 | — | | 0 | 0 | 0 | 0 | 0 | 0 |
| San Lorenzo | Total | | 7 | 0 | 0 | 0 | — | | 0 | 0 | 0 | 0 | 7 | 0 |
| Atlético de Rafaela (loan) | 2018–19 | Primera B Nacional | 2 | 0 | 1 | 0 | — | | — | | 0 | 0 | 3 | 0 |
| Career total | | | 9 | 0 | 1 | 0 | — | | 0 | 0 | 0 | 0 | 10 | 0 |
