= Lautaro Carrachino =

Argentine footballer

Personal information
- Full name: Lautaro Iván Carrachino
- Date of birth: 16 April 1997 (age 29)
- Place of birth: Morón, Argentina
- Height: 1.78 m (5 ft 10 in)
- Position: Forward

Youth career
- San Lorenzo

Senior career*
Years	Team	Apps	(Gls)
2018–2019	San Lorenzo	0	(0)
2018–2019	→ Almagro (loan)	4	(0)
- * Club domestic league appearances and goals

Lautaro Iván Carrachino (born 16 April 1997) is an Argentine former professional footballer who played as a forward.

== Career ==
Carrachino started his career in the youth of San Lorenzo. In August 2018, Carrachino completed a loan move to Primera B Nacional's Almagro. He made his professional debut on 28 October, appearing for the final six minutes of a goalless draw with Nueva Chicago at the Estadio Nueva Chicago. Further appearances followed against Atlético de Rafaela, Gimnasia y Esgrima and Instituto, in a campaign that saw him be an unused substitute eleven times. Carrachino returned to San Lorenzo on 30 June 2019, but was soon released by the club.

== Personal life ==
In May 2014, Carrachino had a warrant out for his arrest for an alleged involvement in a robbery which led to a homicide. He was later declared unimpeachable and agreed to testify. On 12 September 2020, Carrachino was named as a potential suspect by prosecutor Juan Pablo Tahtagian following the murder of a 20-year-old woman and a 30-year-old man in Ciudad Evita on 10 September. A few weeks later, he was officially declared wanted by two different investigations; one investigating a singular homicide from January 2020, while the other announced he and accomplice Cristian Cruz (alias: Chucky) were the leaders of drug gang La banda del 15; who were wanted for multiple charges, including robbery and coercion.

== Career statistics ==
Club statistics
Club	Season	League			Cup		League Cup		Continental		Other		Total	
Club	Season	Division	Apps	Goals	Apps	Goals	Apps	Goals	Apps	Goals	Apps	Goals	Apps	Goals
San Lorenzo	2018–19	Primera División	0	0	0	0	0	0	0	0	0	0	0	0
Almagro (loan)	2018–19	Primera B Nacional	4	0	0	0	—		—		0	0	4	0
Career total			4	0	0	0	0	0	0	0	0	0	4	0
