= Gabriel Gudiño =

Argentine footballer

Personal information
- Full name: Gabriel Alejandro Gudiño
- Date of birth: 16 March 1992 (age 34)
- Place of birth: Córdoba, Argentina
- Height: 1.70 m (5 ft 7 in)
- Position: Right winger

Team information
- Current team: Deportivo Madryn

Youth career
- Porteña

Senior career*
Years	Team	Apps	(Gls)
2013	Tiro Federal	36	(8)
2014	Las Palmas	8	(1)
2015	9 de Julio	28	(4)
2016	Libertad	17	(8)
2016–2017	Atlético Rafaela	26	(8)
2017–2020	San Lorenzo	24	(2)
2019	→ Belgrano (loan)	7	(0)
2019–2020	→ Cultural Leonesa (loan)	22	(4)
2021–2022	Patronato	41	(5)
2022–2023	Huracán	33	(4)
2023–2024	Platense	3	(0)
2024–2025	Sarmiento	17	(1)
2025	Estudiantes RC	11	(0)
2025–2026	Tembetary	15	(2)
2026–	Deportivo Madryn	2	(0)
- * Club domestic league appearances and goals as of 16:55, 27 April 2026 (UTC)

Gabriel Alejandro Gudiño (born 16 March 1992) is an Argentine professional footballer who plays as a right winger for Deportivo Madryn.

== Career ==
Gudiño was in the youth ranks of Porteña at the age of 15. His first two clubs in his senior footballing career were Tiro Federal and Las Palmas. After spells at the aforementioned teams, Gudiño joined Torneo Federal A side 9 de Julio in 2015 and went on to score four goals in twenty-eight appearances. He spent the 2016 Torneo Federal A campaign with Libertad, he participated in seventeen matches and scored eight times. In July 2016, Gudiño joined Argentine Primera División club Atlético de Rafaela. He made his top-flight debut on 28 August in a match against Atlético Tucumán, who would win the game.

Almost a year later, Gudiño joined San Lorenzo following the relegation of Rafaela. He scored his first San Lorenzo goal in his tenth appearance for the club, in a 0–2 league win versus Temperley on 29 October 2017. Gudiño was loaned out to Belgrano in January 2019; a move to Colón had previously fallen through. He made eight appearances for Belgrano as they were relegated to Primera B Nacional. On 19 August 2019, Gudiño departed San Lorenzo on loan again as he agreed to go to Spain with Segunda División B outfit Cultural Leonesa. He netted in his first two games versus Bilbao Athletic and Logroñés. He returned to his parent club in August 2020.

In April 2024, Gudiño joined Sarmiento.

== Career statistics ==
As of 29 August 2020.

Club statistics
Club	Season	League			Cup		League Cup		Continental		Other		Total	
Club	Season	Division	Apps	Goals	Apps	Goals	Apps	Goals	Apps	Goals	Apps	Goals	Apps	Goals
Atlético de Rafaela	2016–17	Primera División	26	8	2	1	—		—		0	0	28	9
San Lorenzo	2017–18	Primera División	21	2	2	0	—		4 (Note: Appearance(s) in the Copa Libertadores and Copa Sudamericana)	1	0	0	27	3
San Lorenzo	2018–19	Primera División	3	0	1	0	0	0	3 (Note: Appearance(s) in the Copa Sudamericana)	0	0	0	7	0
San Lorenzo	2019–20	Primera División	0	0	0	0	0	0	0	0	0	0	0	0
San Lorenzo	Total		24	2	3	0	0	0	7	1	0	0	34	3
Belgrano (loan)	2018–19	Primera División	7	0	0	0	1	0	—		0	0	8	0
Cultural Leonesa (loan)	2019–20	Segunda División B	21	4	3	0	—		—		1 (Note: Appearance(s) in Segunda División B play-offs)	0	25	4
Career total			78	14	8	1	1	0	7	1	1	0	95	16
