= Nahuel Barrios =

Argentine footballer

Personal information
- Full name: Cristian Nahuel Barrios
- Date of birth: 7 May 1998 (age 28)
- Place of birth: Dock Sud, Argentina
- Height: 1.56 m (5 ft 1 in)
- Position: Left winger

Team information
- Current team: San Lorenzo
- Number: 28

Youth career
- 2010–2017: San Lorenzo

Senior career*
Years	Team	Apps	(Gls)
2017–	San Lorenzo	163	(7)
2020	→ Defensa y Justicia (loan)	2	(0)
2020–2021	→ Central Córdoba SdE (loan)	15	(0)
2025	→ Barracas Central (loan)	22	(0)
- * Club domestic league appearances and goals as of 18:08, 21 November 2026 (UTC)

Cristian Nahuel Barrios (born 7 May 1998) is an Argentine professional footballer who plays as a left winger for Argentine Primera División side San Lorenzo.

== Career ==
Barrios joined San Lorenzo in 2010. He made his professional career debut on 25 April 2017 for the club against Universidad Católica in the Copa Libertadores, netting the winning goal in a 2–1 win in the process. He followed that by featuring in the Argentine Primera División for the first time on 21 May versus Aldosivi; having been an unused substitute in the league on four previous occasions. Overall, he made six appearances in his debut campaign of 2016–17.

== Personal life ==
In May 2018, Barrios was tied up and burgled inside his own home; though was unharmed.

== Career statistics ==
As of 21 May 2018.

Club statistics
Club	Season	League			Cup (Note: Includes the Copa Argentina)		League Cup		Continental (Note: Includes the Copa Libertadores and Copa Sudamericana)		Other		Total	
Club	Season	Division	Apps	Goals	Apps	Goals	Apps	Goals	Apps	Goals	Apps	Goals	Apps	Goals
San Lorenzo	2016–17	Primera División	4	6	5	2	—		2 (Note: Two appearances in 2017 Copa Libertadores)	1 (Note: One goal in 2017 Copa Libertadores)	0	0	6	1
San Lorenzo	2017–18	Primera División	16	21	15	34	—		2 (Note: One appearance in 2017 Copa Libertadores, one appearance in 2018 Copa Sudamericana)	0	0	0	19	2
Career total			20	27	20	36	—		4	1	0	0	25	3

== Honours ==
=== Individual ===
- Argentine Primera División Team of the Season: 2023
