= Rodrigo De Ciancio =

Argentine professional footballer

Personal information
- Full name: Rodrigo Facundo De Ciancio
- Date of birth: 30 March 1995 (age 31)
- Place of birth: Buenos Aires, Argentina
- Height: 1.80 m (5 ft 11 in)
- Position: Midfielder

Team information
- Current team: Latina
- Number: 30

Senior career*
Years	Team	Apps	(Gls)
2016–2019	San Lorenzo	2	(0)
2017–2018	→ Temperley (loan)	10	(1)
2018–2019	→ Platense (loan)	8	(0)
2019–2020	Atlanta	7	(0)
2020–2021	Sambenedettese	18	(0)
2021–2025	Picerno	112	(0)
2025–	Latina	31	(0)
- * Club domestic league appearances and goals as of 1 May 2026

Rodrigo Facundo De Ciancio (born 30 March 1995) is an Argentine professional footballer who plays as a midfielder for Serie C Group B club Latina.

== Career ==
After being an unused substitute for San Lorenzo during a defeat to Arsenal de Sarandí on 12 March 2016, De Ciancio was selected for his career debut a month later for a Copa Libertadores encounter with L.D.U. Quito. His first league appearance for the club arrived in the following October against Newell's Old Boys. July 2017 saw De Ciancio join fellow Argentine Primera División side Temperley on loan. Eight appearances into his spell with Temperley, he scored the opening goal of his senior career versus Argentinos Juniors on 2 December. On 30 July 2018, Platense of Primera B Nacional loaned De Ciancio.

July 2019 saw De Ciancio leave San Lorenzo permanently to join second tier team Atlanta. He appeared just seven times for the club, six of which came off the bench, in a season that was curtailed due to the COVID-19 pandemic. On 2 October 2020, De Ciancio was unveiled as a new signing for Serie C outfit Sambenedettese. He made his debut during a 1–1 draw at home to Fermana on 7 October.

On 10 August 2021, he signed for Picerno in Serie C.

== Career statistics ==
As of 22 December 2020.

Club statistics
Club	Season	League			Cup		League Cup		Continental		Other		Total	
Club	Season	Division	Apps	Goals	Apps	Goals	Apps	Goals	Apps	Goals	Apps	Goals	Apps	Goals
San Lorenzo	2016	Primera División	0	0	0	0	—		1 (Note: Appearance(s) in the Copa Libertadores)	0	0	0	1	0
San Lorenzo	2016–17	Primera División	2	0	0	0	—		0	0	0	0	2	0
San Lorenzo	2017–18	Primera División	0	0	0	0	—		0	0	0	0	0	0
San Lorenzo	2018–19	Primera División	0	0	0	0	0	0	0	0	0	0	0	0
San Lorenzo	Total		2	0	0	0	0	0	1	0	0	0	3	0
Temperley (loan)	2017–18	Primera División	10	1	1	0	—		—		0	0	11	1
Platense (loan)	2018–19	Primera B Nacional	8	0	0	0	—		—		0	0	8	0
Atlanta	2019–20	Primera B Nacional	7	0	0	0	—		—		0	0	7	0
Sambenedettese	2020–21	Serie C	4	0	0	0	0	0	—		0	0	4	0
Career total			31	1	1	0	0	0	1	0	0	0	33	1
