= Sebastián Martelli =

Argentine footballer

Personal information
- Full name: Sebastián Alejandro Martelli
- Date of birth: March 13, 1996 (age 30)
- Place of birth: Buenos Aires, Argentina
- Height: 1.70 m (5 ft 7 in)
- Position: Left midfielder

Team information
- Current team: Argentino de Quilmes

Youth career
- Vélez Sarsfield

Senior career*
Years	Team	Apps	(Gls)
2014–2017	Vélez Sarsfield	4	(0)
2015	→ Veracruz (loan)	0	(0)
2016	→ Lobos BUAP (loan)	5	(0)
2017–2018	Temperley	11	(0)
2018	Coquimbo Unido	3	(0)
2019–2020	Almirante Brown	5	(1)
2021	Temperley	1	(0)
2022–	Argentino de Quilmes	13	(1)
- * Club domestic league appearances and goals as of 18:01, 3 August 2022 (UTC)

Sebastián Alejandro Martelli (born March 13, 1996) is an Argentine footballer who plays for Argentino de Quilmes.

== Career ==
Martelli debuted for Vélez Sarsfield under José Oscar Flores' coaching, in a 0–1 defeat to Belgrano for the 2014 Argentine Primera División season.

The midfielder played the 2015–16 on loan in México, first for Veracruz and later for Lobos BUAP.
