= Leandro Guzmán =

Argentine footballer (born 1989)

Personal information
- Full name: Leandro Esteban Guzmán
- Date of birth: 19 April 1989 (age 37)
- Place of birth: Resistencia, Argentina
- Height: 1.73 m (5 ft 8 in)
- Position: Midfielder

Team information
- Current team: Almirante Brown

Youth career
- Huracán Las Breñas

Senior career*
Years	Team	Apps	(Gls)
2008–2015	Atlanta	213	(14)
2016	Guillermo Brown	6	(0)
2016–2018	Deportivo Morón	50	(4)
2018–	Almirante Brown	99	(4)
- * Club domestic league appearances and goals as of 17:42, 8 June 2022 (UTC)

Leandro Esteban Guzmán (born 19 April 1989) is an Argentine professional footballer who plays as a midfielder for Almirante Brown.

== Career ==
In 2008, Guzmán began playing at senior level with Atlanta in Primera B Metropolitana; having played for Huracán Las Breñas's youth. He scored his first goal versus Flandria in April 2009. His third season, 2010–11, concluded with promotion to Primera B Nacional as champions. Guzmán's second tier bow arrived on 21 August 2011 versus Atlético Tucumán. The club suffered instant relegation back to Primera B Metropolitana, as the midfielder appeared twenty-five times. Five goals along with one hundred and five matches followed as he remained for four seasons. In January 2016, Guzmán signed for Guillermo Brown of Primera B Nacional.

Guzmán joined third-tier team Deportivo Morón in July 2016. He scored four goals, three of which were in games with Acassuso in his opening campaign, which ended with promotion to Primera B Nacional. After eighteen games in the succeeding campaign, Guzmán completed a move to Almirante Brown on 18 July 2018.

== Career statistics ==
As of 23 April 2019.

Appearances and goals by club, season and competition
Club	Season	League			Cup		League Cup		Continental		Other		Total	
Club	Season	Division	Apps	Goals	Apps	Goals	Apps	Goals	Apps	Goals	Apps	Goals	Apps	Goals
Atlanta	2011–12	Primera B Nacional	25	0	0	0	—		—		0	0	25	0
Atlanta	2012–13	Primera B Metropolitana	40	4	0	0	—		—		2 (Note: Appearance(s) in the Primera B Metropolitana play-offs)	0	42	4
Atlanta	2013–14	Primera B Metropolitana	24	0	1	0	—		—		2	0	27	0
Atlanta	2014	Primera B Metropolitana	9	0	0	0	—		—		0	0	9	0
Atlanta	2015	Primera B Metropolitana	23	1	3	0	—		—		1	0	27	1
Atlanta	Total		121	5	4	0	—		—		5	0	130	5
Guillermo Brown	2016	Primera B Nacional	6	0	0	0	—		—		0	0	6	0
Deportivo Morón	2016–17	Primera B Metropolitana	32	4	3	0	—		—		0	0	35	4
Deportivo Morón	2017–18	Primera B Nacional	18	0	3	1	—		—		0	0	21	1
Deportivo Morón	Total		50	4	6	1	—		—		0	0	56	5
Almirante Brown	2018–19	Primera B Metropolitana	24	0	0	0	—		—		0	0	24	0
Career total			201	9	10	1	—		—		5	0	216	10

== Honours ==
Atlanta

- Primera B Metropolitana: 2010–11

Deportivo Morón

- Primera B Metropolitana: 2016–17
