= Víctor Salazar (footballer, born 1993) =

Argentinian footballer

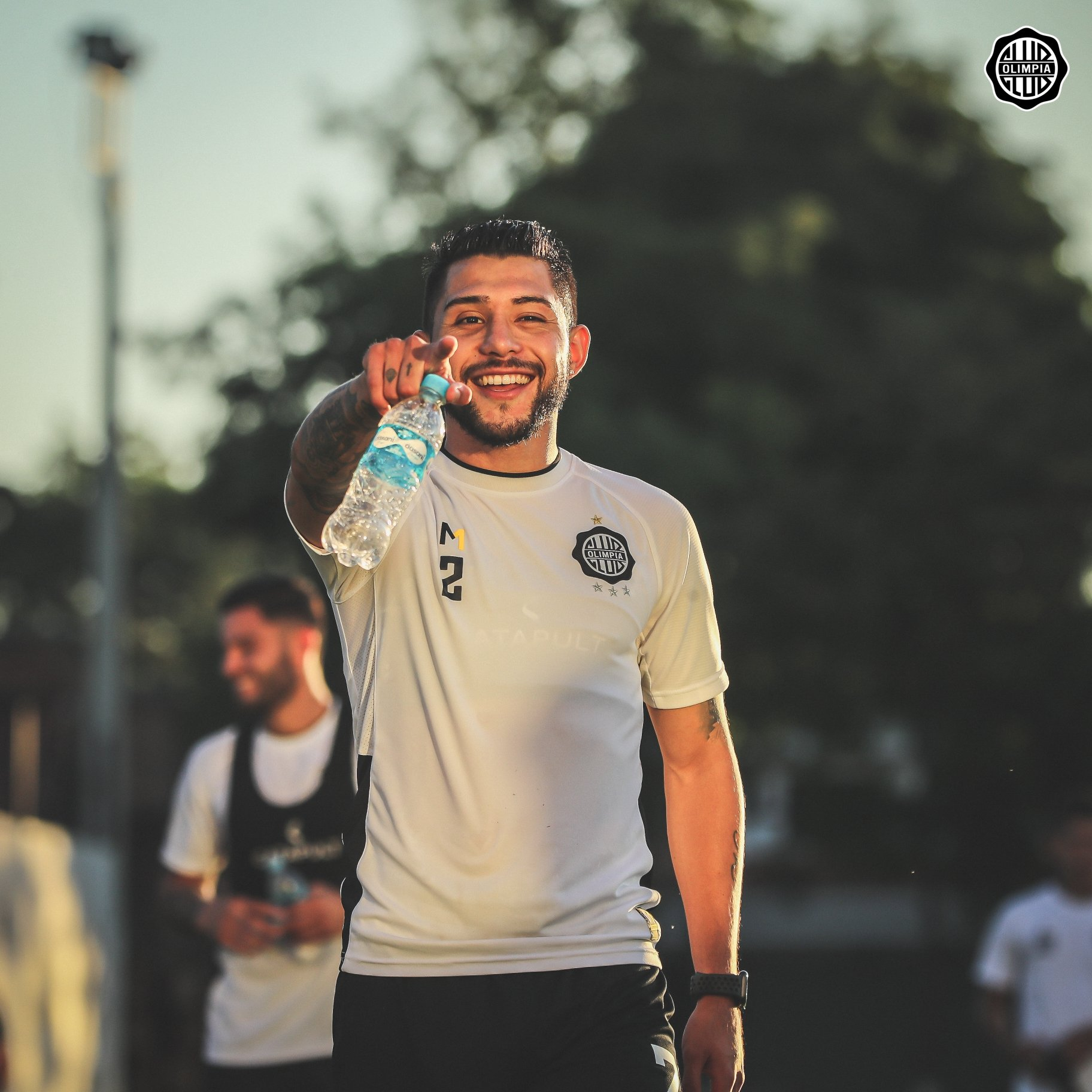
- 2022

Personal information
- Full name: Víctor Ezequiel Salazar
- Date of birth: 26 May 1993 (age 33)
- Place of birth: Tafí Viejo, Argentina
- Height: 1.75 m (5 ft 9 in)
- Position: Right-back

Team information
- Current team: San Martín Tucumán

Youth career
- 2007–2014: Rosario Central

Senior career*
Years	Team	Apps	(Gls)
2014–2017	Rosario Central	48	(0)
2017–2021	San Lorenzo	41	(0)
2021–2026	Olimpia	58	(2)
2025	→ Sportivo Ameliano (loan)	23	(0)
2026–	San Martín Tucumán	8	(0)
- * Club domestic league appearances and goals as of 17:24, 4 May 2026 (UTC)

Víctor Ezequiel Salazar (born 26 May 1993) is an Argentine professional footballer who plays as a right-back for San Martín Tucumán.

== Career ==
Salazar joined Rosario Central in 2007. He was promoted into their senior team by manager Miguel Ángel Russo in November 2011, Salazar featured for ninety minutes in a draw with Olimpo which turned out to be Russo's final game in charge. In his opening four campaigns with the club, he featured seventy times in all competitions between 2014 and 2017. On 29 June 2017, Salazar left Rosario Central to play for San Lorenzo. He made his San Lorenzo debut in the Copa Libertadores versus Emelec on 7 July. His league bow came against former team Rosario Central on 10 September, he lasted just forty-three minutes before receiving a red card.

== Personal life ==
Salazar is the brother of fellow footballer Nahuel Salazar. He is married to Xoana Barrientos, a hockey player for Provincial.

== Career statistics ==
As of 28 May 2018.

Club statistics
Club	Season	League			Cup (Note: Includes the Copa Argentina)		League Cup		Continental (Note: Includes the Copa Sudamericana)		Other		Total	
Club	Season	Division	Apps	Goals	Apps	Goals	Apps	Goals	Apps	Goals	Apps	Goals	Apps	Goals
Rosario Central	2014	Primera División	2	0	0	0	—		0	0	0	0	2	0
Rosario Central	2015	Primera División	17	0	6	0	—		—		0	0	23	0
Rosario Central	2016	Primera División	12	0	0	0	—		9	0	0	0	21	0
Rosario Central	2016–17	Primera División	17	0	7	0	—		—		0	0	24	0
Rosario Central	Total		48	0	13	0	—		9	0	0	0	70	0
San Lorenzo	2017–18	Primera División	7	0	1	0	—		2	0	0	0	10	0
Career total			55	0	14	0	—		11	0	0	0	80	0
