= Elías Pereyra =

Argentine footballer (born 1999)

Personal information
- Full name: Elías Juan Pereyra
- Date of birth: 15 January 1999 (age 27)
- Place of birth: González Catán, Argentina
- Height: 1.72 m (5 ft 7 1/2 in)
- Position: Left-back

Team information
- Current team: Barracas Central
- Number: 17

Youth career
- 2007–2018: San Lorenzo

Senior career*
Years	Team	Apps	(Gls)
2018–2020	San Lorenzo	11	(0)
2020	→ Benfica B (loan)	2	(0)
2020–2022	Panetolikos	30	(0)
2022–2026	Godoy Cruz	26	(0)
2023	→ Athens Kallithea (loan)	6	(0)
2025	→ Instituto (loan)	22	(0)
2026	Defensa y Justicia	11	(2)
2026–	Barracas Central	1	(0)

International career
2019	Argentina U20	4	(0)
- * Club domestic league appearances and goals as of 16:03, 26 July 2026 (UTC)

Elías Juan Pereyra (born 15 February 1999) is an Argentine professional footballer who plays as a left-back for Barracas Central.

== Club career ==
Pereyra's career got underway with San Lorenzo, signing in 2007. Claudio Biaggio was the manager who gave him his debut, selecting him to start and finish a 2–2 draw with Lanús on 19 August 2018. His next appearance arrived days later in the Copa Sudamericana versus Club Nacional. After thirteen appearances for the club, Pereyra departed on loan in January 2020 to LigaPro side Benfica B. He appeared in fixtures with Leixões and C.D. Nacional before returning to San Lorenzo. On 12 August 2020, Pereyra was signed by Super League Greece club Panetolikos; he penned a three-year contract.

== International career ==
Pereyra has previously been selected by the Argentina U20s, including to train with the senior squad in March 2018 and at the 2018 FIFA World Cup months later. In December, Pereyra was picked for the 2019 South American U-20 Championship.

== Personal life ==
Pereyra was diagnosed with leukemia at the age of 13. After ten months of chemotherapy at Hospital Garrahan, Pereyra was cleared of the disease.

== Career statistics ==
As of 17 December 2020.

Club statistics
Club	Season	League			National Cup		Continental		Total	
Club	Season	Division	Apps	Goals	Apps	Goals	Apps	Goals	Apps	Goals
San Lorenzo	2018–19	Argentine Primera División	10	0	1	0	1 (Note: Appearance in Copa Sudamericana)	0	12	0
San Lorenzo	2019–20	Argentine Primera División	1	0	0	0	0	0	1	0
San Lorenzo	Total		11	0	1	0	1	0	13	0
Benfica B (loan)	2019–20	LigaPro	2	0	—		—		2	0
Panetolikos	2020–21	Super League Greece	4	0	0	0	—		4	0
Career total			17	0	1	0	1	0	19	0
