= Felix Villacorta =

Argentine footballer

Personal information
- Full name: Felix Matías Roberto Villacorta
- Date of birth: 29 March 1997 (age 29)
- Place of birth: Buenos Aires, Argentina
- Height: 1.90 m (6 ft 3 in)
- Position: Forward

Team information
- Current team: Olimpo

Youth career
- San Lorenzo

Senior career*
Years	Team	Apps	(Gls)
2017–2019	San Lorenzo	0	(0)
2017–2018	→ Defensores de Belgrano (loan)	18	(1)
2018–2019	→ Fénix (loan)	20	(3)
2019–2020	Atenas	9	(2)
2022–2023	Argentino Quilmes	46	(8)
2024	Colegiales	39	(5)
2025–	Olimpo	8	(3)
- * Club domestic league appearances and goals as of 16:40, 21 June 2025 (UTC)

Felix Matías Villacorta (born 29 March 1997) is an Argentine professional footballer who plays as a forward for Olimpo.

== Career ==
Villacorta started with San Lorenzo. In August 2017, Primera B Metropolitana side Defensores de Belgrano loaned Villacorta. His professional debut arrived on 2 September against Platense, which was followed by Villacorta scoring his opening career goal in his first start for Defensores de Belgrano during a home loss versus Comunicaciones on 7 October. Fénix loaned Villacorta in June 2018. After scoring goals against Almirante Brown, Defensores Unidos and Sacachispas across 2018–19, Villacorta switched Argentina for Uruguay in July 2019 after signing with Segunda División team Atenas.

Villacorta netted on his starting debut, as Atenas beat Bella Vista 3–0 at the Estadio Atenas on 24 August. Another goal followed in October against Villa Teresa, prior to Villacorta leaving after nine appearances in 2020.

== Career statistics ==
As of 26 August 2020.

Club statistics
Club	Season	League			Cup		League Cup		Continental		Other		Total	
Club	Season	Division	Apps	Goals	Apps	Goals	Apps	Goals	Apps	Goals	Apps	Goals	Apps	Goals
San Lorenzo	2017–18	Primera División	0	0	0	0	—		0	0	0	0	0	0
San Lorenzo	2018–19	Primera División	0	0	0	0	0	0	0	0	0	0	0	0
San Lorenzo	Total		0	0	0	0	0	0	0	0	0	0	0	0
Defensores de Belgrano (loan)	2017–18	Primera B Metropolitana	18	1	0	0	—		—		0	0	18	1
Fénix (loan)	2018–19	Primera B Metropolitana	20	3	0	0	—		—		0	0	20	3
Atenas	2019	Segunda División	9	2	—		—		—		0	0	9	2
Career total			47	6	0	0	0	0	0	0	0	0	47	6
