= Adrián Arregui =

Argentine footballer (born 1992)

Personal information
- Full name: Adrián Arregui Marincovich
- Date of birth: 12 August 1992 (age 34)
- Place of birth: Berazategui, Argentina
- Height: 1.76 m (5 ft 9 in)
- Position: Defensive midfielder

Team information
- Current team: Temperley

Youth career
- Quilmes

Senior career*
Years	Team	Apps	(Gls)
2011–2014	Berazategui	58	(3)
2014–2019	Temperley	97	(6)
2017	→ Montreal Impact (loan)	6	(0)
2018–2019	→ San Martín T. (loan)	18	(0)
2019	→ Independiente Medellín (loan)	17	(4)
2020–2023	Independiente Medellín	69	(9)
2020–2021	→ Huracán (loan)	9	(1)
2021	→ Independiente (loan)	7	(0)
2023–2024	Temperley	33	(6)
2024–2025	Alianza Lima	21	(1)
2025–	Temperley	37	(3)
- * Club domestic league appearances and goals as of 17:40, 20 April 2026 (UTC)

Adrián Arregui Marincovich (born 12 August 1992) is an Argentine footballer who currently plays for Temperley,

== Club career ==
Arregui spent almost four years with Temperley, helping them to promotion to the Argentine Primera División. He signed on loan with Major League Soccer side Montreal Impact on 22 February 2017. Arregui and Montreal mutually terminated the loan agreement on 16 June 2017.

In the summer 2019, Arregui joined Colombian club Independiente Medellín on a one-year loan from Temperley with an option to buy. Independiente Medellín confirmed on 30 December 2019, that they had triggered the option and bought 100% of the Arregui's rights. On 25 July 2020, he joined Huracán on a 18-month-long loan for $100,000 with an option to buy for $1,7 million. However, the spell was cut short, as he on 18 February 2021 instead was transferred to fellow league club Independiente, once again on loan, until the end of the season, with a purchase option. Arregui was recalled in June 2021 due to a meniscal injury, which prevented him from playing, and returned to Independiente Medellín.

== Honours ==
Independiente Medellín

- Copa Colombia: 2019
