= Bruno Pittón =

Argentine footballer

Personal information
- Full name: Bruno Alejandro Pittón
- Date of birth: 1 February 1993 (age 33)
- Place of birth: Santa Fe, Argentina
- Height: 1.79 m (5 ft 10 in)
- Position: Left-back

Team information
- Current team: Unión Santa Fe
- Number: 12

Youth career
- Unión Santa Fe

Senior career*
| Years | Team | Apps | (Gls) |
| 2015–2019 | Unión Santa Fe | 77 | (3) |
| 2015 | → Las Parejas (loan) | 15 | (0) |
| 2019–2022 | San Lorenzo | 46 | (9) |
| 2022–2023 | Emelec | 14 | (0) |
| 2023–2024 | Newell's Old Boys | 21 | (1) |
| 2024– | Unión Santa Fe | 63 | (2) |
- * Club domestic league appearances and goals as of 17:26, 22 November 2026 (UTC)

Bruno Alejandro Pittón (born 1 February 1993) is an Argentine professional footballer who plays as a left-back for Unión Santa Fe.

== Career ==
Pittón began his career with Unión Santa Fe, being promoted into the first-team in 2015 and subsequently making his debut in a 0–0 draw against Olimpo on 7 September 2015. Before his debut, Pittón spent time on loan at Torneo Federal A team Sportivo Las Parejas. Two more appearances came during the 2015 Argentine Primera División season before he played in 14 games in 2016 and also scored his first career goal; in a 3–6 loss against Racing Club de Avellaneda on 7 March 2016. A week later, Bruno and his brother Mauro played together for the first time in a Primera División game against Boca Juniors.

In June 2019, Unión Santa Fe revealed San Lorenzo had agreed a deal in principle, subject to terms and medicals, for Bruno Pittón and his brother Mauro. They completed their moves on 22 June. After appearances in either leg against Cerro Porteño as they exited the Copa Libertadores, Pittón scored on his first and second game in the Primera División versus Gimnasia y Esgrima and Rosario Central.

== Personal life ==
He is the brother of fellow footballer Mauro Pittón.

== Career statistics ==
As of 6 October 2019.

Club statistics
| Club | Season | League | | | Cup | | League Cup | | Continental | | Other | | Total | |
| Club | Season | Division | Apps | Goals | Apps | Goals | Apps | Goals | Apps | Goals | Apps | Goals | Apps | Goals |
|---|---|---|---|---|---|---|---|---|---|---|---|---|---|---|
| Unión Santa Fe | 2015 | Primera División | 3 | 0 | 0 | 0 | — | | — | | 0 | 0 | 3 | 0 |
| Unión Santa Fe | 2016 | Primera División | 14 | 1 | 1 | 0 | — | | — | | 0 | 0 | 15 | 1 |
| Unión Santa Fe | 2016–17 | Primera División | 17 | 1 | 1 | 0 | — | | — | | 0 | 0 | 18 | 1 |
| Unión Santa Fe | 2017–18 | Primera División | 21 | 0 | 2 | 0 | — | | — | | 0 | 0 | 23 | 0 |
| Unión Santa Fe | 2018–19 | Primera División | 22 | 1 | 2 | 0 | 3 | 0 | 2 (Note: Appearance(s) in the Copa Sudamericana) | 0 | 0 | 0 | 29 | 1 |
| Unión Santa Fe | Total | | 77 | 3 | 6 | 0 | 3 | 0 | 2 | 0 | 0 | 0 | 88 | 3 |
| Sportivo Las Parejas (loan) | 2015 | Torneo Federal A | 15 | 0 | 0 | 0 | — | | — | | 0 | 0 | 15 | 0 |
| San Lorenzo | 2019–20 | Primera División | 7 | 5 | 0 | 0 | 0 | 0 | 2 (Note: Appearance(s) in the Copa Libertadores) | 0 | 0 | 0 | 9 | 5 |
| Career total | | | 99 | 8 | 6 | 0 | 3 | 0 | 4 | 0 | 0 | 0 | 112 | 8 |
