= Mauro Pittón =

Argentine footballer

Personal information
- Full name: Mauro Rodolfo Pittón
- Date of birth: 8 August 1994 (age 32)
- Place of birth: Santa Fe, Argentina
- Height: 1.81 m (5 ft 11 in)
- Position: Defensive midfielder

Team information
- Current team: Tenerife

Youth career
- Unión Santa Fe

Senior career*
Years	Team	Apps	(Gls)
2015–2019	Unión Santa Fe	96	(4)
2019–2020	San Lorenzo	8	(0)
2020–2024	Vélez Sarsfield	8	(0)
2021	→ Unión Santa Fe (loan)	22	(0)
2022	→ Arsenal Sarandí (loan)	40	(3)
2023	→ Central Córdoba (loan)	40	(0)
2024–2026	Unión Santa Fe	89	(4)
2026–	Tenerife	0	(0)
- * Club domestic league appearances and goals as of 16:41, 4 June 2026 (UTC)

Mauro Rodolfo Pittón (born 8 August 1994) is an Argentine professional footballer who plays as a defensive midfielder for Segunda División club Tenerife.

== Career ==
Pittón started with Unión Santa Fe in the club's youth ranks before making the step up to first-team football in 2015, his Primera División debut came on 23 August in an away defeat against Tigre; his only appearance in the 2015 season. In 2016, Pittón made ten appearances but only three were starts. In the following season he started Unión's first eight matches in all competitions. On 15 March 2016, Pittón and his brother Bruno played together for the first time in a Primera División game against Boca Juniors. He scored his first goal two years later versus Banfield. 2019 saw Pittón make his Copa Sudamericana bow against Independiente del Valle.

On 21 June 2019, Unión announced that a deal in principle had been agreed with San Lorenzo for the transfer of Mauro and his brother Bruno; subject to terms and medicals. San Lorenzo confirmed the moves a day later. Mauro was sold for a fee around €1,3 million.

On 16 January 2020, Pittón was sold to Vélez Sarsfield for a fee around €1,6 million, signing a deal until the end of June 2023. After only 10 appearances in all competitions for Vélez in his first 12 months at the club, Pittón was loaned to his former club Unión in February 2021 until the end of the year. A year later, in February 2022, Pittón was loaned out to Arsenal de Sarandí.

On 18 July 2026, after two years back at Unión, Pittón signed a two-year contract with Segunda División side Tenerife.

== Personal life ==
He is the brother of fellow footballer Bruno Pittón.

== Career statistics ==
As of 18 August 2019.

Club statistics
Club	Season	League			Cup		League Cup		Continental		Other		Total	
Club	Season	Division	Apps	Goals	Apps	Goals	Apps	Goals	Apps	Goals	Apps	Goals	Apps	Goals
Unión Santa Fe	2015	Primera División	1	0	0	0	—		—		0	0	1	0
Unión Santa Fe	2016	Primera División	10	0	0	0	—		—		0	0	10	0
Unión Santa Fe	2016–17	Primera División	23	0	4	0	—		—		0	0	27	0
Unión Santa Fe	2017–18	Primera División	27	1	3	0	—		—		0	0	30	1
Unión Santa Fe	2018–19	Primera División	23	3	2	0	3	1	2 (Note: Appearance(s) in the Copa Sudamericana)	0	0	0	30	4
Unión Santa Fe	Total		84	4	9	0	3	1	2	0	0	0	98	5
San Lorenzo	2019–20	Primera División	3	0	0	0	0	0	2 (Note: Appearance(s) in the Copa Libertadores)	0	0	0	5	0
Career total			87	4	9	0	3	1	4	0	0	0	103	5
