= Andrés Herrera (footballer) =

Argentine footballer (born 1998)

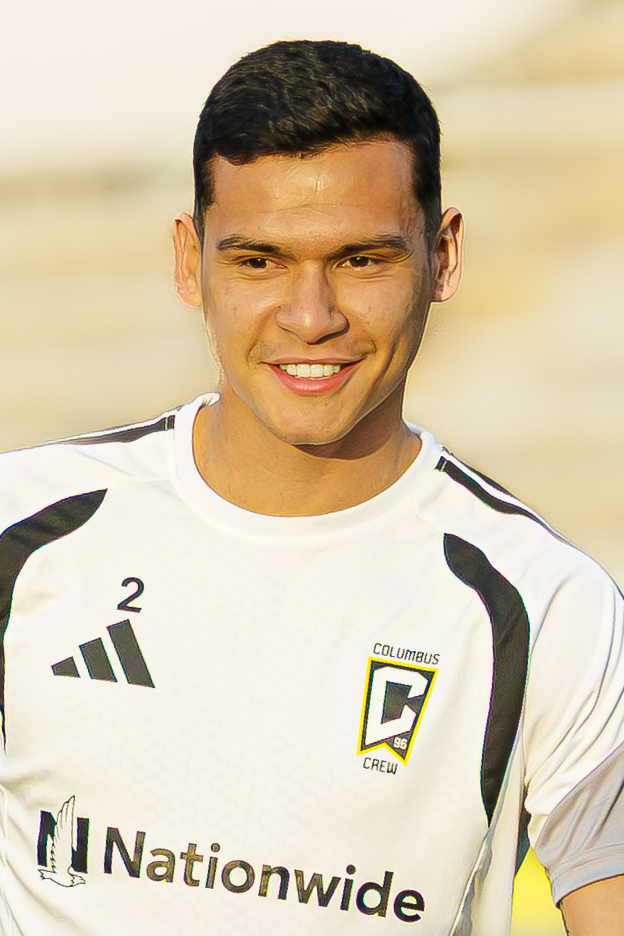
- Herrera with the Columbus Crew in 2026

Personal information
- Full name: Marcelo Andrés Herrera Mansilla
- Date of birth: 3 November 1998 (age 28)
- Place of birth: Corrientes, Argentina
- Height: 1.78 m (5 ft 10 in)
- Position: Right-back

Team information
- Current team: Columbus Crew (on loan from River Plate)
- Number: 2

Youth career
- Textil Mandiyú
- Boca Unidos
- Rivadavia
- 2016–2018: San Lorenzo

Senior career*
Years	Team	Apps	(Gls)
2018–2022	San Lorenzo	46	(3)
2022–	River Plate	59	(2)
2024–2026	→ Columbus Crew (loan)	43	(5)
2026–	Columbus Crew	11	(0)

International career^{‡}
2019	Argentina U23	11	(0)
Medal record
Representing Argentina
Men's Football
Pan American Games
Gold medal – first place	2019 Lima	Team competition
- * Club domestic league appearances and goals as of 8 November 2026 ‡ National team caps and goals as of 7 August 2024 (UTC)

Marcelo Andrés Herrera Mansilla (born 3 November 1998) is an Argentine professional footballer who plays as a right-back for Major League Soccer club Columbus Crew.

== Club career ==
Herrera started his senior career with San Lorenzo, having had youth spells with Textil Mandiyú, Boca Unidos and Rivadavia. He was selected in the club's senior squad during the 2018–19 Argentine Primera División campaign, with his professional debut arriving on 21 September 2018 during a win over Patronato at the Estadio Pedro Bidegain; he played the full ninety minutes as San Lorenzo won 3–2. Herrera ended 2018–19 with three goals, split across the Primera División, the Copa Argentina and the Copa Libertadores. In September 2020, he suffered a fractured tibia due to a hard tackle in training with teammate Ángel Romero.

On 3 February 2022, Herrera joined River Plate for a fee of US$2.5 million, signing a 3-year deal, with San Lorenzo holding a 30% sell-on clause. He extended his contract in February 2024 for an additional year, with his new deal expiring in December 2026.

On 6 August 2024, it was announced that he was loaned to Major League Soccer club Columbus Crew until 30 June 2025. He made his debut for his new club on 28 August, starting in the 1–0 win against the Philadelphia Union. He scored his first goal with his new club on 18 September against Toronto FC. On 14 July 2025, it was announced that his loan was extended for another year. During the 2025 season, Herrera scored six goals across all competitions, including goals in back-to-back games to conclude the regular season. On 1 July 2026, it was announced that Herrera had been acquired by Columbus on a permanent transfer.

== International career ==
In July 2019, Herrera made the Argentina U23s' squad for the Pan American Games in Peru. He made five appearances as Argentina beat Honduras in the final to secure the trophy.

== Career statistics ==
As of 28 August 2024.

Club statistics
Club	Season	League			Cup		League Cup		Continental		Other		Total	
Club	Season	Division	Apps	Goals	Apps	Goals	Apps	Goals	Apps	Goals	Apps	Goals	Apps	Goals
San Lorenzo	2018–19	Primera División	10	1	1	0	4	1	5	1	0	0	20	3
San Lorenzo	2019–20	Primera División	12	1	2	0	0	0	0	0	0	0	14	1
San Lorenzo	2021	Primera División	24	1	0	0	0	0	8	1	0	0	32	2
San Lorenzo	Total		46	3	3	0	4	1	13	2	0	0	66	6
River Plate	2022	Primera División	26	1	3	1	0	0	5	0	0	0	34	2
River Plate	2023	Primera División	5	0	1	0	0	0	2	0	0	0	8	0
River Plate	Total		31	1	4	1	0	0	7	0	0	0	42	2
Columbus Crew	2024	Major League Soccer	4	1	0	0	4	0	6	1				
Career total			78	4	7	1	8	0	20	2	0	0	5	8

== Honours ==
Argentina U23

- Pan American Games: 2019
- Pre-Olympic Tournament: 2020

River Plate

- Primera División: 2023
- Supercopa Argentina: 2023

Columbus Crew

- Leagues Cup: 2024
