= Nicolás Rodríguez (footballer, born 1993) =

Argentine footballer

Personal information
- Full name: Nicolás Fabián Rodríguez
- Date of birth: 12 May 1993 (age 33)
- Place of birth: Quilmes, Argentina
- Height: 1.91 m (6 ft 3 in)
- Position: Goalkeeper

Team information
- Current team: Unión San Felipe
- Number: 27

Senior career*
Years	Team	Apps	(Gls)
2013–2015	River Plate	0	(0)
2015	→ Temperley (loan)	0	(0)
2016	Talleres	0	(0)
2016–2017	Temperley	0	(0)
2017–2018	Fénix	33	(0)
2018–2019	Santamarina	22	(0)
2020–	Unión San Felipe	2	(0)
- * Club domestic league appearances and goals as of 2 December 2020

Nicolás Fabián Rodríguez (born 12 May 1993) is an Argentine professional footballer who plays as a goalkeeper for Unión San Felipe.

== Career ==
Rodríguez's career started with River Plate. He was an unused substitute on eleven occasions in the 2013–14 and 2014 seasons. In 2015, he departed on loan to join fellow Argentine Primera División team Temperley. Rodríguez returned to his parent club at the conclusion of 2015 without featuring for Temperley. He departed River Plate permanently in 2016, subsequently joining Primera B Nacional's Talleres. Talleres won promotion in his first season, but Rodríguez failed to be selected for a first-team game though he was on the bench twice. In July 2017, Rodríguez rejoined Temperley of the Primera División.

However, like in 2015, he didn't make an appearance in 2016–17. On 21 July 2017, Rodríguez joined Primera B Metropolitana side Fénix. He made his professional debut on 2 September against Tristán Suárez, playing the full duration of a 2–0 defeat. It was one of thirty-three appearances in his opening campaign with Fénix. June 2018 saw Rodríguez move up to Primera B Nacional by joining Santamarina.

== Career statistics ==
As of 7 September 2018.

Club statistics
Club	Season	League			Cup (Note: Includes the Copa Argentina)		League Cup		Continental (Note: Includes the Copa Libertadores and Copa Sudamericana)		Other		Total	
Club	Season	Division	Apps	Goals	Apps	Goals	Apps	Goals	Apps	Goals	Apps	Goals	Apps	Goals
River Plate	2013–14	Primera División	0	0	0	0	—		0	0	0	0	0	0
River Plate	2014	Primera División	0	0	0	0	—		0	0	0	0	0	0
River Plate	2015	Primera División	0	0	0	0	—		0	0	0	0	0	0
River Plate	Total		0	0	0	0	—		0	0	0	0	0	0
Temperley (loan)	2015	Primera División	0	0	0	0	—		—		0	0	0	0
Talleres	2016	Primera B Nacional	0	0	0	0	—		—		0	0	0	0
Temperley	2016–17	Primera División	0	0	0	0	—		—		0	0	0	0
Fénix	2017–18	Primera B Metropolitana	33	0	0	0	—		—		0	0	33	0
Santamarina	2018–19	Primera B Nacional	2	0	0	0	—		—		0	0	2	0
Career total			35	0	0	0	—		0	0	0	0	35	0

== Honours ==
River Plate

- U-20 Copa Libertadores: 2012
- Primera División: 2013–14 Torneo Final

Talleres

- Primera B Nacional: 2016
