= Rodrigo Tapia (footballer, born 1994) =

Argentine footballer

Personal information
- Full name: Rodrigo Ernesto Tapia
- Date of birth: 28 September 1994 (age 32)
- Place of birth: Buenos Aires, Argentina
- Height: 1.84 m (6 ft 1/2 in)
- Position: Centre back

Team information
- Current team: Atlético Grau
- Number: 27

Senior career*
Years	Team	Apps	(Gls)
2011–	San Lorenzo	2	(0)
2016–2017	→ Defensa y Justicia (loan)	2	(0)
2017–2018	→ Palestino (loan)	23	(0)
2018–2019	→ Banfield (loan)	2	(0)
2019–2020	→ Nueva Chicago (loan)	7	(0)
2020–2023	Mitre	93	(2)
2024–	Grau	67	(0)
- * Club domestic league appearances and goals as of 29 December 2025

Rodrigo Ernesto Tapia (born 28 September 1994) is an Argentine footballer who plays for Atlético Grau as a defender.

== Career statistics ==
=== Club ===
As of 25 February 2024.

Club	Division	League			National Cup		Continental		Total	
Club	Division	Season	Apps	Goals	Apps	Goals	Apps	Goals	Apps	Goals
San Lorenzo	Argentine Primera División	2016	1	0	3	0	—		4	0
Defensa y Justicia	Argentine Primera División	2017	2	0	—		—		2	0
Palestino	Chilean Primera División	2017	14	0	4	0	2	0	20	0
Palestino	Chilean Primera División	2018	9	0	2	1	—		11	1
Palestino	Total		23	0	6	1	2	0	31	1
San Lorenzo	Argentine Primera División	2019	1	0	—		—		1	0
San Lorenzo	Total		2	0	3	0	0	0	5	0
Banfield	Argentine Primera División	2019	2	0	—		—		2	0
Nueva Chicago	Primera Nacional	2020	7	0	—		—		7	0
Mitre	Primera Nacional	2021	30	1	—		—		30	1
Mitre	Primera Nacional	2022	32	0	—		—		32	0
Mitre	Primera Nacional	2023	31	1	—		—		31	1
Mitre	Total		93	2	0	0	0	0	93	2
Grau	Peruvian Primera División	2024	5	0	—		—		5	0
Career total			134	2	9	1	2	0	145	3

== Honours ==
San Lorenzo

- Supercopa Argentina: 2015
