= José Devecchi =

Argentine footballer (born 1995)

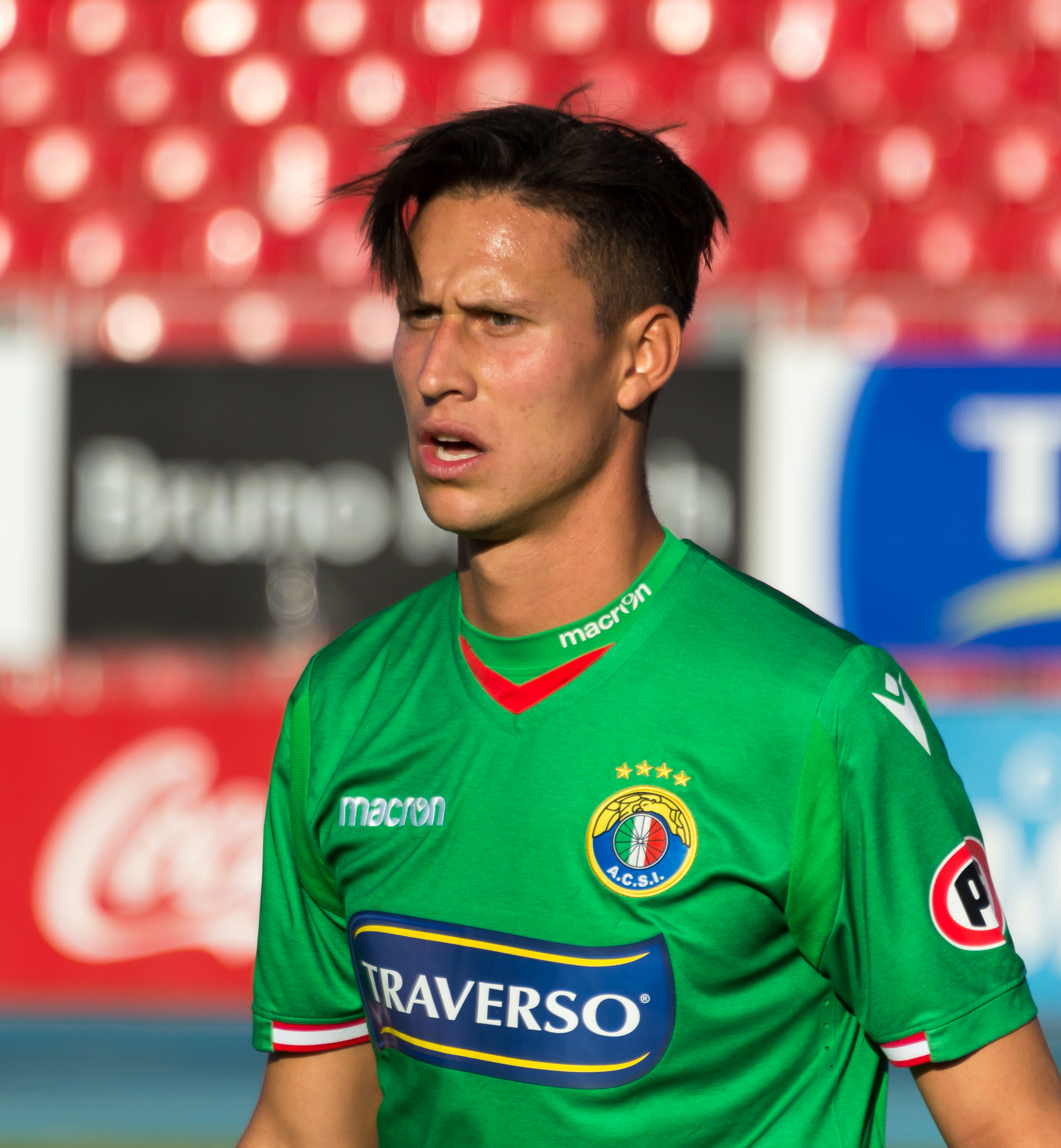
- Devecchi with Audax Italiano in 2020

Personal information
- Full name: José Antonio Devecchi
- Date of birth: 9 July 1995 (age 31)
- Place of birth: Corrientes, Argentina
- Height: 1.87 m (6 ft 2 in)
- Position: Goalkeeper

Team information
- Current team: San Lorenzo
- Number: 25

Youth career
- 2009–2014: San Lorenzo

Senior career*
Years	Team	Apps	(Gls)
2014–	San Lorenzo	23	(0)
2020–2021	→ Audax Italiano (loan)	15	(0)
2021–2022	→ Aldosivi (loan)	66	(0)
2023	→ Sarmiento (loan)	20	(0)
2024	→ Atlético Tucumán (loan)	14	(0)
2024	→ Banfield (loan)	0	(0)
2025	→ Sarmiento (loan)	0	(0)
- * Club domestic league appearances and goals as of 18:04, 21 November 2026 (UTC)

José Antonio Devecchi (born 9 July 1995) is an Argentine professional footballer who plays as a goalkeeper for San Lorenzo.

== Honours ==
San Lorenzo

- Supercopa Argentina: 2015

Argentina U-20

- South American Youth Football Championship: 2015
