= 2019–20 Club Almagro season =

Almagro
2019–20 season
- President: Julián Romeo
- Manager: Carlos Mayor
- Stadium: Estadio Almagro
- Top goalscorer: League: Germán Herrera (1); All: Juan Manuel Martínez (1); Germán Herrera

The 2019–20 season is Almagro's 5th consecutive season in the second division of Argentine football. In addition to Primera B Nacional, the club are competing in the Copa Argentina.

The season generally covers the period from 1 July 2019 to 30 June 2020.

== Review ==
=== Pre-season ===
The departures of Lucas Piovi and Damián Arce were revealed on 14 and 15 June, with the wide midfielders joining Arsenal de Sarandí and Instituto respectively. On 19 June, Almagro announced the signing of forward Facundo Suárez from San Martín (F); who he had scored eight times for in the 2018–19 Torneo Federal A. Joaquín Susvielles followed Piovi and Arce out the door on 21 June, as he penned a contract with Platense. Gonzalo Jaque completed a move in from San Lorenzo on 26 June. Mariano Puch to Comunicaciones was confirmed on 27 June. José Méndez signed on 29 June, having spent a season in Mexico with Tampico Madero. Some loans from 2018 to 2019 ended on 30 June, but Brian Benítez, Ezequiel Denis and Santiago López extended their loan stints.

Adrián Torres left for Chacarita Juniors on 1 July. Almagro formalised five new signings on 2 July. Walter Rueda made a move from Atlético Paraná, while Román Martinangeli, Sebastián Diana, Lucas Bossio and Norberto Paparatto signed from Sacachispas, Crucero del Norte, Guillermo Brown and Mitre respectively. Leonardo Acosta joined fellow Primera B Nacional team Atlético de Rafaela on 3 July. Acquisition number nine came on 8 July, as goalkeeper Cristian Limousin returned to Argentina from Ecuador's Técnico Universitario; he previously played for Almagro from 2016 to 2018. Germán Herrera arrived from Boca Unidos on 10 July. Marcelo Scatolaro left for Comunicaciones on 12 July. Almagro went unbeaten in friendlies with Chacarita Juniors on 13 July.

Mauro González moved out to Temperley on 13 July, while Lucas Wilchez did the opposite on 16 July. Almagro held three friendlies on 16 July, two versus Colegiales and one against the Argentina U23s; they'd draw one and lose two. Maximiliano García agreed to go to Comunicaciones on 18 July. New player Facundo Suárez netted a goal in each game as Almagro drew and then beat Ferro Carril Oeste on 20 July. Gustavo Turraca returned to Primera B Nacional on loan on 23 July, having been relegated from it with Los Andes in 2018–19. On 24 July, Agustín Coscia was loaned from Rosario Central. A friendly with Quilmes was postponed on 26 July, in order to preserve the Estadio Centenario Ciudad de Quilmes pitch following heavy rain; rescheduling was confirmed.

Friendlies with Quilmes were belatedly played on 30 July, as they couldn't be separated after two goalless draws. On 3 August, Almagro travelled to face Nueva Chicago in back-to-back exhibitions; subsequently losing on both occasions. 9 August saw Fermín Holgado pen terms from Olimpo. On 10 August, Leandro Lugarzo departed for Guillermo Brown.

=== August ===
Almagro stunned Primera División club Boca Juniors on 13 August by eliminating them from the Copa Argentina R32, with Juan Manuel Martínez's goal taking the tie to penalties which saw Almagro came out victorious. Almagro signed Patricio Toranzo from Huracán on 15 August. Almagro's opening day fixture with San Martín (T) in Primera B Nacional was postponed, after the San Miguel de Tucumán club had flight problems due to an ongoing storm. Almagro eventually had their first fixture on 25 August, as a Leandro Aguirre penalty consigned them to defeat. They lost to Argentinos Juniors in an exhibition encounter on 27 August.

=== September ===
Germán Herrera scored for Almagro as they drew away to Villa Dálmine on 1 September. Two days later, Almagro lost to Lanús in a mid-season friendly match.

== Squad ==
Squad No.	Nationality	Name	Position(s)	Date of Birth (age)	Signed from
Goalkeepers
	Argentina	Lucas Calviño	GK	8 November 1984 (age 42)	Deportivo Español
	Argentina	Francisco Del Riego	GK	24 March 1993 (age 33)	Sportivo Patria
	Argentina	Fermín Holgado	GK	17 May 1994 (age 32)	Olimpo
	Argentina	Cristian Limousin	GK	29 November 1991 (age 34)	Técnico Universitario
	Argentina	Horacio Ramírez	GK	21 March 1984 (age 42)	Quilmes
Defenders
	Argentina	Ramiro Arias	LB	6 January 1993 (age 33)	Sarmiento
	Argentina	Nicolás Arrechea	CB	16 May 1991 (age 35)	Academy
	Argentina	Nahuel Basualdo	DF	23 February 1991 (age 35)	Academy
	Uruguay	Sebastián Diana	LB	2 August 1990 (age 36)	Crucero del Norte
	Argentina	Nicolás Fattoni	DF	7 July 1997 (age 29)	Academy
	Argentina	Marco Lambert	DF	9 January 1997 (age 29)	Academy
	Argentina	Santiago López	CB	15 August 1997 (age 29)	San Lorenzo (loan)
	Argentina	Norberto Paparatto	CB	3 January 1984 (age 42)	Mitre
Midfielders
	Argentina	Brian Benítez	MF	17 April 1996 (age 30)	San Lorenzo (loan)
	Argentina	Lucas Bossio	DM	6 March 1990 (age 36)	Guillermo Brown
	Argentina	Alejandro Gallego	MF	18 April 1996 (age 30)	Academy
	Argentina	Germán Herrera	MF	5 February 1993 (age 33)	Boca Unidos
	Argentina	Gonzalo Jaque	AM	5 December 1996 (age 29)	San Lorenzo
	Argentina	Iván Kabobel	MF	11 July 1997 (age 29)	Academy
	Argentina	Marcos Litre	RW	14 September 1988 (age 38)	Alvarado
	Argentina	Walter Rueda	MF	2 December 1997 (age 28)	Atlético Paraná
	Argentina	Patricio Toranzo	RM	19 March 1982 (age 44)	Huracán
	Argentina	Gustavo Turraca	MF	15 July 1995 (age 31)	Los Andes (loan)
	Argentina	Lucas Wilchez	AM	31 August 1983 (age 43)	Temperley
Forwards
	Argentina	Agustín Coscia	CF	8 April 1997 (age 29)	Rosario Central (loan)
	Argentina	Ezequiel Denis	FW	4 April 1996 (age 30)	Independiente (loan)
	Argentina	Román Martinangeli	FW	10 April 1993 (age 33)	Sacachispas
	Argentina	Juan Manuel Martínez	CF	25 October 1985 (age 41)	Agropecuario
	Argentina	José Méndez	RW	28 March 1993 (age 33)	Tampico Madero
	Argentina	Eial Strahman	CF	21 June 1989 (age 37)	Independiente Rivadavia
	Argentina	Facundo Suárez	FW	1 July 1994 (age 32)	San Martín (F)
	Argentina	Jonathan Torres	FW	29 December 1996 (age 29)	Quilmes

== Transfers ==
Domestic transfer windows:
3 July 2019 to 24 September 2019
20 January 2020 to 19 February 2020.

=== Transfers in ===
Date from	Position	Nationality	Name	From	Ref.
3 July 2019 (Note: Deal agreed on 19 June 2019)	FW	Argentina	Facundo Suárez	San Martín (F)	
3 July 2019 (Note: Deal agreed on 26 June 2019)	AM	Argentina	Gonzalo Jaque	San Lorenzo	
3 July 2019 (Note: Deal agreed on 29 June 2019)	RW	Argentina	José Méndez	Tampico Madero	
3 July 2019 (Note: Deal agreed on 2 July 2019)	MF	Argentina	Walter Rueda	Atlético Paraná	
3 July 2019 (Note: Deal agreed on 2 July 2019)	FW	Argentina	Román Martinangeli	Sacachispas	
3 July 2019 (Note: Deal agreed on 2 July 2019)	LB	Uruguay	Sebastián Diana	Crucero del Norte	
3 July 2019 (Note: Deal agreed on 2 July 2019)	DM	Argentina	Lucas Bossio	Guillermo Brown	
3 July 2019 (Note: Deal agreed on 2 July 2019)	CB	Argentina	Norberto Paparatto	Mitre	
8 July 2019	GK	Argentina	Cristian Limousin	Técnico Universitario	
10 July 2019	MF	Argentina	Germán Herrera	Boca Unidos	
16 July 2019	AM	Argentina	Lucas Wilchez	Temperley	
9 August 2019	GK	Argentina	Fermín Holgado	Olimpo	
15 August 2019	RM	Argentina	Patricio Toranzo	Huracán	

=== Transfers out ===
Date from	Position	Nationality	Name	To	Ref.
3 July 2019 (Note: Deal agreed on 14 June 2019)	RM	Argentina	Lucas Piovi	Arsenal de Sarandí	
3 July 2019 (Note: Deal agreed on 15 June 2019)	LM	Argentina	Damián Arce	Instituto	
3 July 2019 (Note: Deal agreed on 21 June 2019)	FW	Argentina	Joaquín Susvielles	Platense	
3 July 2019 (Note: Deal agreed on 27 June 2019)	RM	Argentina	Mariano Puch	Comunicaciones	
3 July 2019 (Note: Deal agreed on 1 July 2019)	DF	Argentina	Adrián Torres	Chacarita Juniors	
3 July 2019	FW	Argentina	Leonardo Acosta	Atlético de Rafaela	
12 July 2019	CM	Chile	Marcelo Scatolaro	Comunicaciones	
13 July 2019	CM	Argentina	Mauro González	Temperley	
18 July 2019	CB	Argentina	Maximiliano García	Comunicaciones	
10 August 2019	CB	Argentina	Leandro Lugarzo	Guillermo Brown	

=== Loans in ===
Start date	Position	Nationality	Name	From	End date	Ref.
23 July 2019	MF	Argentina	Gustavo Turraca	Los Andes	30 June 2020	
24 July 2019	CF	Argentina	Agustín Coscia	Rosario Central	30 June 2020	

== Friendlies ==
=== Pre-season ===
Chacarita Juniors revealed a pre-season friendly (set for 13 July) with Almagro on 20 June 2019; with it taking place on the premises of UTA Argentina in Moreno. The club confirmed a series of friendlies of 3 July, including trips to Quilmes and Nueva Chicago. They also had matches with Colegiales and the Argentina U23s.

Win Draw Loss

13 July 2019 Friendly	Chacarita Juniors	0–1	Almagro	Moreno, Argentina
09:35 GMT-3		Almagro; Grupo La Provincia; 80 min. match	G. Herrera	Stadium: UTA Argentina; Attendance: 0 (Note: Behind closed doors.)

13 July 2019 Friendly	Chacarita Juniors	1–1	Almagro	Moreno, Argentina
11:15 GMT-3	G. Groba	Almagro; Grupo La Provincia; 80 min. match	E. Denis	Stadium: UTA Argentina; Attendance: 0 (Note: Behind closed doors.)

17 July 2019 Friendly	Almagro	0–0	Colegiales	José Ingenieros, Argentina
		Colegiales; Mundo Ascenso; 80 min. match		Stadium: Estadio Almagro

17 July 2019 Friendly	Almagro	0–2	Colegiales	José Ingenieros, Argentina
		Almagro; Mundo Ascenso; 80 min. match 80 min. match	R. Paillalef; L. González	Stadium: Estadio Almagro

17 July 2019 Friendly	Almagro	0–3	Argentina U23	Ezeiza, Argentina
		Almagro; IAM Noticias; AFA; 80 min. match	N. González; C. Valenzuela; A. Gaich	Stadium: Complejo Deportivo de Ezeiza

20 July 2019 Friendly	Ferro Carril Oeste	1–1	Almagro	Buenos Aires, Argentina
	F. Miranda	Ferro Carril Oeste; Mundo Ascenso; 70 min. match	F. Suárez	Stadium: Estadio Arquitecto Ricardo Etcheverry

20 July 2019 Friendly	Ferro Carril Oeste	0–1	Almagro	Buenos Aires, Argentina
		Almagro; Mundo Ascenso; 70 min. match	F. Suárez	Stadium: Estadio Arquitecto Ricardo Etcheverry

27 July 2019 Friendly	Quilmes	Postponed	Almagro	Quilmes, Argentina
		Quilmes		Stadium: Estadio Centenario Ciudad de Quilmes

30 July 2019 Friendly	Quilmes	0–0	Almagro	Quilmes, Argentina
10:00 GMT-3		Perspectiva Sur; 60 min. match		Stadium: Estadio Centenario Ciudad de Quilmes; Attendance: 0 (Note: Behind closed doors.)

30 July 2019 Friendly	Quilmes	0–0	Almagro	Quilmes, Argentina
		Perspectiva Sur; 60 min. match		Stadium: Estadio Centenario Ciudad de Quilmes; Attendance: 0 (Note: Behind closed doors.)

3 August 2019 Friendly	Nueva Chicago	1–0	Almagro	Buenos Aires, Argentina
	C. Díaz	Almagro; Grupo La Provincia		Stadium: Estadio Nueva Chicago

3 August 2019 Friendly	Nueva Chicago	2–1	Almagro	Buenos Aires, Argentina
	F. Brizuela; C. More	Almagro; Mundo Ascenso	N. Paparatto	Stadium: Estadio Nueva Chicago

=== Mid-season ===
Almagro would meet Argentinos Juniors in a friendly at the Estadio Diego Armando Maradona on 27 August. They'd face another Primera División team in Lanús; away, on 3 September.

Win Draw Loss

27 August 2019 Friendly	Argentinos Juniors	1–0	Almagro	Buenos Aires, Argentina
	M. Angeleri	Almagro; 70 min. match		Stadium: Estadio Diego Armando Maradona; Attendance: 0 (Note: Behind closed doors.)

3 September 2019 Friendly	Lanús	3–1	Almagro	Lanús, Argentina
	J. Sinisterra; G. Lodico	Lanús; Politica del Sur	Goal	Stadium: Estadio Ciudad de Lanús – Néstor Díaz Pérez

== Competitions ==
=== Primera B Nacional ===
==== Results summary ====
Overall								Home						Away					
Pld	W	D	L	GF	GA	GD	Pts	W	D	L	GF	GA	GD	W	D	L	GF	GA	GD
2	0	1	1	1	2	−1	1	0	0	1	0	1	−1	0	1	0	1	1	0

Last updated: 3 September 2019.
Source: Soccerway

==== Matches ====
The fixtures for the 2019–20 league season were announced on 1 August 2019, with a new format of split zones being introduced. Almagro were drawn in Zone B.

Win Draw Loss

18 August 2019 1	Almagro	Postponed	San Martín (T)	José Ingenieros, Argentina
13:00 GMT-3		TyC Sports		Stadium: Estadio Almagro; Referee: Gerardo Méndez Cedro (Argentina)

25 August 2019 1	Almagro	0–1	Gimnasia y Esgrima (M)	José Ingenieros, Argentina
15:30 GMT-3		El Ciudadano; Soccerway	L. Aguirre 42' (pen.)	Stadium: Estadio Almagro; Referee: Lucas Novelli (Argentina)

1 September 2019 2	Villa Dálmine	1–1	Almagro	Campana, Argentina
19:30 GMT-3	M. Ballini 42' (pen.)	Almagro; Grupo La Provincia; Soccerway	G. Herrera 22'	Stadium: Estadio El Coliseo de Mitre y Puccini; Referee: Luis Lobo (Argentina)

7 September 2019 3	Almagro	–	Sarmiento	José Ingenieros, Argentina
15:05 GMT-3				Stadium: Estadio Almagro

=== Copa Argentina ===
Almagro were drawn against Boca Juniors in the round of thirty-two in the Copa Argentina.

Win Draw Loss

13 August 2019 R32	Boca Juniors	1–1 (1–3 p)	Almagro	La Plata, Argentina
21:10 GMT-3	D. De Rossi 28'	Infobae; Soccerway	J. Martínez 82'	Stadium: Estadio Ciudad de La Plata; Referee: Silvio Trucco (Argentina)
	Penalties
	C. Tevez (penalty scored); A. Mac Allister (penalty missed); J. Hurtado (penalty missed); E. Salvio (penalty missed)		E. Denis (penalty scored); L. Wilchez (penalty scored); A. Coscia (penalty scored)

== Squad statistics ==
=== Appearances and goals ===
No.	Pos.	Nationality	Name	League		Cup		League Cup		Continental		Other		Total		Discipline		Ref
No.	Pos.	Nationality	Name	Apps	Goals	Apps	Goals	Apps	Goals	Apps	Goals	Apps	Goals	Apps	Goals	Yellow card	Red card	Ref
–	GK	Argentina	Lucas Calviño	2	0	0	0	—		—		0	0	2	0	0	0	
–	GK	Argentina	Francisco Del Riego	0	0	0	0	—		—		0	0	0	0	0	0	
–	GK	Argentina	Fermín Holgado	0	0	0	0	—		—		0	0	0	0	0	0	
–	GK	Argentina	Cristian Limousin	0	0	1	0	—		—		0	0	1	0	1	0	
–	GK	Argentina	Horacio Ramírez	0	0	0	0	—		—		0	0	0	0	0	0	
–	LB	Argentina	Ramiro Arias	1	0	1	0	—		—		0	0	2	0	0	0	
–	CB	Argentina	Nicolás Arrechea	2	0	1	0	—		—		0	0	3	0	2	0	
–	DF	Argentina	Nahuel Basualdo	0	0	0	0	—		—		0	0	0	0	0	0	
–	LB	Uruguay	Sebastián Diana	2	0	1	0	—		—		0	0	3	0	1	0	
–	DF	Argentina	Nicolás Fattoni	0	0	0	0	—		—		0	0	0	0	0	0	
–	DF	Argentina	Marco Lambert	0	0	0	0	—		—		0	0	0	0	0	0	
–	CB	Argentina	Santiago López	0	0	0	0	—		—		0	0	0	0	0	0	
–	CB	Argentina	Norberto Paparatto	0	0	0	0	—		—		0	0	0	0	0	0	
–	MF	Argentina	Brian Benítez	1	0	1	0	—		—		0	0	2	0	0	0	
–	DM	Argentina	Lucas Bossio	2	0	1	0	—		—		0	0	3	0	3	0	
–	MF	Argentina	Alejandro Gallego	0	0	0	0	—		—		0	0	0	0	0	0	
–	MF	Argentina	Germán Herrera	2	1	1	0	—		—		0	0	3	1	1	0	
–	AM	Argentina	Gonzalo Jaque	2	0	1	0	—		—		0	0	3	0	1	0	
–	MF	Argentina	Iván Kabobel	0	0	0	0	—		—		0	0	0	0	0	0	
–	RW	Argentina	Marcos Litre	0	0	0	0	—		—		0	0	0	0	0	0	
–	MF	Argentina	Walter Rueda	0	0	0	0	—		—		0	0	0	0	0	0	
–	RM	Argentina	Patricio Toranzo	1	0	0	0	—		—		0	0	1	0	0	0	
–	MF	Argentina	Gustavo Turraca	0	0	0	0	—		—		0	0	0	0	0	0	
–	AM	Argentina	Lucas Wilchez	0(2)	0	0(1)	0	—		—		0	0	0(3)	0	0	0	
–	CF	Argentina	Agustín Coscia	1(1)	0	0(1)	0	—		—		0	0	1(2)	0	0	0	
–	FW	Argentina	Ezequiel Denis	0(2)	0	0(1)	0	—		—		0	0	0(3)	0	0	0	
–	FW	Argentina	Román Martinangeli	0	0	0	0	—		—		0	0	0	0	0	0	
–	CF	Argentina	Juan Manuel Martínez	2	0	1	1	—		—		0	0	3	1	0	0	
–	RW	Argentina	José Méndez	2	0	1	0	—		—		0	0	3	0	0	0	
–	CF	Argentina	Eial Strahman	0(1)	0	0	0	—		—		0	0	0(1)	0	0	0	
–	FW	Argentina	Facundo Suárez	1	0	1	0	—		—		0	0	2	0	0	0	
–	FW	Argentina	Jonathan Torres	0	0	0	0	—		—		0	0	0	0	0	0	
Own goals				—	0	—	0	—		—		—	0	—	0	—	—	—

Statistics accurate as of 3 September 2019.

=== Goalscorers ===
Rank	Pos	No.	Nat	Name	League	Cup	League Cup	Continental	Other	Total	Ref
1	CF	–	Argentina	Juan Manuel Martínez	0	1	–	–	0	1	
1	MF	–	Argentina	Germán Herrera	1	0	–	–	0	1	
Own goals					0	0	–	–	0	0	
Totals					1	1	–	–	0	2	—
