= Calvino (disambiguation) =

Calvino usually refers to Italo Calvino, an Italian writer.

Calvino may also refer to:

- Calvino (crater)
- Calvino (surname)

== See also ==
- Calvino Noir, a video game
- Calviño, a surname
