= Nicolás Arrechea =

Argentine footballer (born 1991)

Personal information
- Date of birth: 16 May 1991 (age 35)
- Place of birth: José Ingenieros, Argentina
- Height: 1.78 m (5 ft 10 in)
- Position: Centre-back

Youth career
- Almagro

Senior career*
Years	Team	Apps	(Gls)
2012–2020	Almagro	173	(4)
2017–2018	→ Sol de América (loan)	13	(1)
2020–2022	Brown de Adrogué	61	(2)
2023	Flandria	29	(0)
2024–2025	Brown de Adrogué	16	(1)
2025	Comunicaciones	15	(0)
- * Club domestic league appearances and goals

Nicolás Arrechea (born 16 May 1991) is an Argentine former professional footballer who played as a centre-back.

== Career ==
Arrechea's career started with Almagro. He made his professional debut on 11 September 2012 during a Primera B Metropolitana fixture with Villa San Carlos, which was the first of sixteen appearances in his debut campaign; prior to scoring his first senior goal against Defensores de Belgrano in September 2013. On 25 June 2017, Sol de América of the Paraguayan Primera División completed the loan signing of Arrechea. His first appearance arrived versus Olimpia on 22 July, which preceded his first goal against Independiente four appearances later. His stay with the club lasted parts of the 2017 and 2018 seasons.

== Career statistics ==
As of 7 November 2018.

Club statistics
Club	Season	League			Cup (Note: Includes the Copa Argentina and Copa Paraguay)		League Cup		Continental (Note: Includes the Copa Sudamericana)		Other		Total	
Club	Season	Division	Apps	Goals	Apps	Goals	Apps	Goals	Apps	Goals	Apps	Goals	Apps	Goals
Almagro	2012–13	Primera B Metropolitana	15	0	0	0	—		—		1 (Note: One appearance in the 2012–13 Primera B Metropolitana play-offs)	0	16	0
Almagro	2013–14	Primera B Metropolitana	19	1	1	0	—		—		0	0	20	1
Almagro	2014	Primera B Metropolitana	10	0	0	0	—		—		0	0	10	0
Almagro	2015	Primera B Metropolitana	29	0	0	0	—		—		4 (Note: Four appearances in the 2015 Primera B Metropolitana play-offs)	0	33	0
Almagro	2016	Primera B Nacional	10	1	0	0	—		—		0	0	10	1
Almagro	2016–17	Primera B Nacional	37	1	1	0	—		—		0	0	38	1
Almagro	2017–18	Primera B Nacional	0	0	0	0	—		—		0	0	0	0
Almagro	2018–19	Primera B Nacional	9	0	3	0	—		—		0	0	12	0
Almagro	Total		129	3	5	0	—		—		5	0	139	3
Sol de América (loan)	2017	Primera División	8	1	—		—		1 (Note: One appearance in the 2017 Copa Sudamericana)	0	0	0	9	1
Sol de América (loan)	2018	Primera División	5	0	0	0	—		0	0	0	0	5	0
Sol de América (loan)	Total		13	1	0	0	—		1	0	0	0	14	1
Career total			142	4	5	0	—		1	0	5	0	153	4
