= PUHS =

PUHS may refer to:

- Patagonia Union High School, Patagonia, Arizona, USA
- Phoenix Union High School, Phoenix, Arizona, USA

== See also ==
- Puh, a surname
