= Puch (disambiguation) =

Puch may refer to:

- Puch, a former manufacturer of cars, motorcycles, mopeds and bicycles
- Puch bei Weiz, a municipality in Styria, Austria
- Puch bei Hallein, a municipality in Salzburg, Austria
- Puch (Fürstenfeldbruck), a district in Fürstenfeldbruck
- Puch, Razavi Khorasan, a village in Razavi Khorasan Province, Iran
- Puch, South Khorasan, a village in South Khorasan Province, Iran
- Unified Party of Haitian Communists, a former Haitian political party

People with the surname Puch:

- Edson Puch, a Chilean footballer
- Ignacio Maestro Puch, an Argentine footballer
- Jeremías Rodríguez Puch, an Argentine footballer
- Johann Puch, a Slovenian inventor and mechanic
- László Puch, a Hungarian entrepreneur and politician
- Mariano Puch, an Argentine footballer
- Pepo Puch, an Austrian Paralympic equestrian
- Roberto Puch, a Peruvian wrestler
- Robledo Puch, an Argentine serial killer
