= Pasuk =

Pasuk may refer to:

- Pasuk, Iran
- Passuk, a verse in the Hebrew Bible
