= Holgado =

Holgado is a surname. Notable people with the surname include:

- Daniel Holgado (born 2005), Spanish motorcyclist
- Fermín Holgado (born 1994), Argentine footballer
- John Holgado (born 1992), American musician
- Juan Holgado (born 1968), Spanish archer
- Rodrigo Holgado (born 1995), Argentine footballer
- Ticky Holgado (1944–2004), French actor
