= Germán Herrera =

Germán Herrera may refer to:

- Germán Herrera (footballer, born 1983), Argentine forward for Rosario Central
- Germán Herrera (footballer, born 1993), Argentine midfielder for Club Atlético Brown
