= Calviño =

Calviño is a Spanish surname. Notable people with the surname include:

- Lucas Calviño (born 1984), Argentine footballer
- María Rosa Calviño de Gómez, Argentine politician
- Nadia Calviño (born 1968), Spanish economist and civil servant

== See also ==
- Calvino (surname)
