= José Méndez (footballer) =

Argentinian association football player

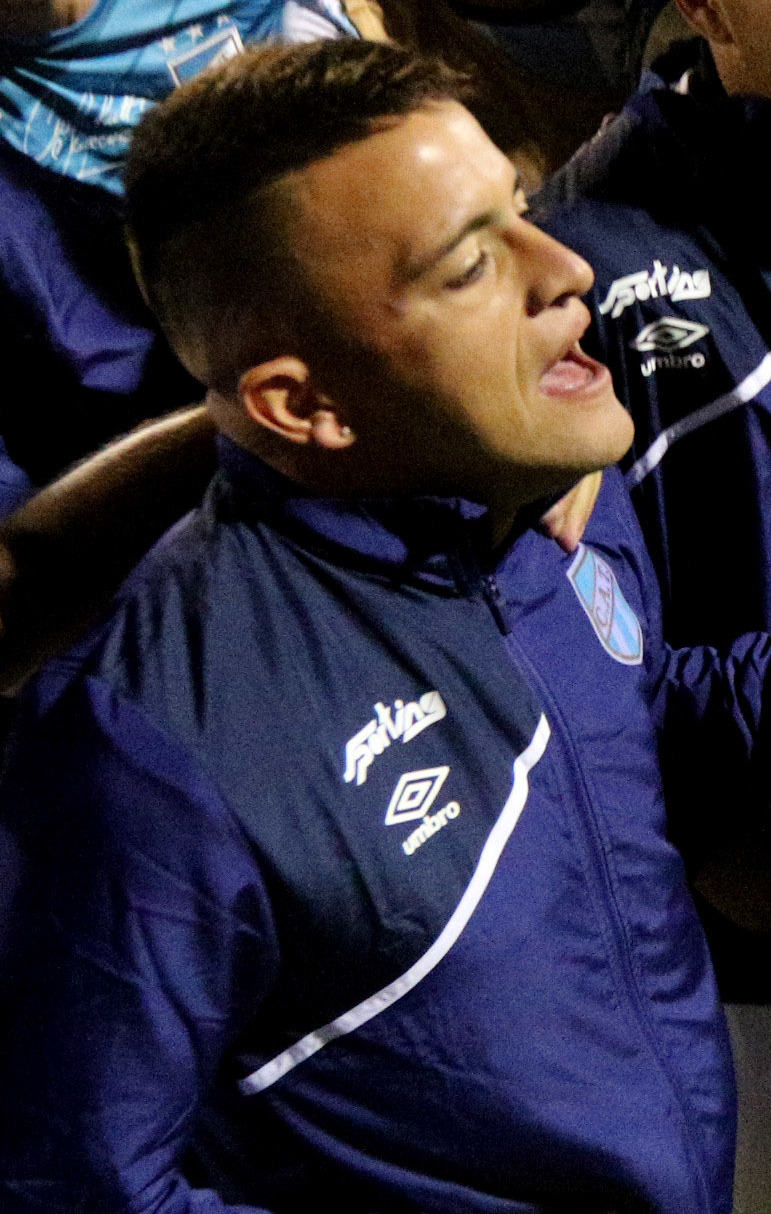

Personal information
- Full name: José Alejandro Méndez
- Date of birth: 28 March 1993 (age 33)
- Place of birth: Mendoza, Argentina
- Height: 1.71 m (5 ft 7 1/2 in)
- Position: Attacking midfielder

Team information
- Current team: Gimnasia y Tiro

Senior career*
Years	Team	Apps	(Gls)
2014	Jorge Newbery	17	(4)
2015–2018	Independiente Rivadavia	57	(7)
2016–2017	→ Atlético Tucumán (loan)	17	(1)
2018–2019	Tampico Madero	23	(2)
2019–2020	Almagro	17	(1)
2020	Atenas	0	(0)
2021	Deportivo Maipú	21	(2)
2021	Huracán Las Heras	17	(3)
2022	Chacarita Juniors	20	(0)
2023	Racing Córdoba	24	(4)
2024	Deportivo Riestra	8	(0)
2024	Racing Córdoba	13	(2)
2025–	Gimnasia y Tiro	14	(1)
- * Club domestic league appearances and goals as of 17:35, 11 August 2025 (UTC)

José Alejandro Méndez (born 28 March 1993) is an Argentine professional footballer who plays as an attacking midfielder for Gimnasia y Tiro.

== Career ==
Méndez began his career in 2014 with Jorge Newbery, he participated in seventeen matches and scored four times before making the move to join Primera B Nacional team Independiente Rivadavia a year later. He managed three goals in thirty-six matches for Independiente. In 2016, Méndez joined Primera División side Atlético Tucumán on loan. His debut came in an 8 February win against Racing Club at the Estadio Monumental José Fierro. He returned to Independiente in July 2017 after Tucumán chose not to sign him permanently. Méndez left for Mexico in June 2018 by signing for Ascenso MX's Tampico Madero.

After scoring goals against Leones Negros and Zacatepec across twenty-three appearances, as they suffered relegation, Méndez agreed his departure from Tampico Madero on 29 June 2019 to Primera B Nacional's Almagro.

== Career statistics ==
As of 30 June 2019.

Club statistics
Club	Season	League			Cup		League Cup		Continental		Other		Total	
Club	Season	Division	Apps	Goals	Apps	Goals	Apps	Goals	Apps	Goals	Apps	Goals	Apps	Goals
Jorge Newbery	2014	Torneo Federal B	17	4	0	0	—		—		0	0	17	4
Independiente Rivadavia	2015	Primera B Nacional	36	3	2	0	—		—		0	0	38	3
Independiente Rivadavia	2016	Primera B Nacional	0	0	0	0	—		—		0	0	0	0
Independiente Rivadavia	2016–17	Primera B Nacional	0	0	0	0	—		—		0	0	0	0
Independiente Rivadavia	2017–18	Primera B Nacional	21	4	0	0	—		—		0	0	21	4
Independiente Rivadavia	Total		57	7	2	0	—		—		0	0	59	7
Atlético Tucumán (loan)	2016	Primera División	9	0	0	0	—		—		0	0	9	0
Atlético Tucumán (loan)	2016–17	Primera División	8	1	1	0	—		3 (Note: Appearance(s) in the Copa Libertadores)	0	0	0	12	1
Atlético Tucumán (loan)	Total		17	1	1	0	—		3	0	0	0	21	1
Tampico Madero	2018–19	Ascenso MX	23	2	4	0	—		—		0	0	27	2
Career total			114	14	7	0	—		3	0	0	0	124	14
