= Riego =

Riego may refer to:

== People with the surname ==
- Amalia Riégo (1850–1926), Swedish soprano opera singer
- Carmina Riego (born 1964), Chilean actress and cultural manager
- Francisco Del Riego (born 1993), Argentine footballer
- Guillermo del Riego (born 1958), Spanish sprint canoeist
- Natalia del Riego (born 2001), American actress
- Olav Riégo (1891–1956), Swedish film actor
- Rafael del Riego (1784–1823), Spanish Army officer and politician
- Rutilio del Riego Jáñez (born 1940), Spanish-born American prelate of the Roman Catholic Church
- Teresa del Riego (1876–1968), English violinist, pianist, singer and composer
- Victorio Riego Prieto (1932–2009), Paraguayan chess player

== People with the given name ==
- Riego Gamalinda (born 1986), Filipino basketball player

== Places ==
- Riego de la Vega, municipality in the province of León, Spain
