= Alejandro Gallego =

Argentine footballer

Personal information
- Full name: Alejandro Gallego
- Date of birth: 18 April 1996 (age 30)
- Place of birth: Argentina
- Position: Midfielder

Youth career
- Almagro

Senior career*
Years	Team	Apps	(Gls)
2017–2020	Almagro	2	(0)
- * Club domestic league appearances and goals as of 15:14, 15 November 2018 (UTC)

Alejandro Gallego (born 18 April 1996) is an Argentine professional footballer who plays as a midfielder.

== Career ==
Gallego started his career with Almagro. He was first promoted into the club's senior team during the 2016–17 Primera B Nacional campaign, subsequently making his professional debut on 27 July 2017 in Almagro's season finale against Ferro Carril Oeste. He didn't make an appearance in the following campaign that was 2017–18, next appearing in September 2018 against Quilmes.

== Career statistics ==
As of 15 November 2018.

Club statistics
Club	Season	League			Cup (Note: Includes the Copa Argentina)		League Cup		Continental		Other		Total	
Club	Season	Division	Apps	Goals	Apps	Goals	Apps	Goals	Apps	Goals	Apps	Goals	Apps	Goals
Almagro	2016–17	Primera B Nacional	1	0	0	0	—		—		0	0	1	0
Almagro	2017–18	Primera B Nacional	0	0	0	0	—		—		0	0	0	0
Almagro	2018–19	Primera B Nacional	1	0	0	0	—		—		0	0	1	0
Career total			2	0	0	0	—		—		0	0	2	0
