= Gustavo Turraca =

Argentine footballer

Personal information
- Date of birth: 15 July 1995 (age 31)
- Place of birth: Monte Grande, Argentina
- Height: 1.67 m (5 ft 6 in)
- Position: Midfielder

Team information
- Current team: All Boys

Youth career
- Los Andes

Senior career*
Years	Team	Apps	(Gls)
2013–2023	Los Andes	128	(2)
2019–2020	→ Almagro (loan)	6	(0)
2022	→ Indep. Rivadavia (loan)	37	(0)
2023–2024	Aldosivi	17	(0)
2024–2025	Patronato	37	(1)
2025	San Miguel	3	(0)
2025–	All Boys	18	(1)
- * Club domestic league appearances and goals as of 17:47, 25 March 2026 (UTC)

Gustavo Turraca (born 15 July 1995) is an Argentine professional footballer who plays as a midfielder for All Boys.

== Career ==
Turraca started out with Los Andes. He was with their first-team for two seasons in Primera B Metropolitana from 2013–14 but didn't make an appearance, with the last of which ending with promotion to Primera B Nacional. Turraca subsequently appeared three times on the substitutes bench in the 2015 campaign without coming on, though did make his senior bow across that year against Fénix in the Copa Argentina on 8 February. He subsequently made sixty-seven appearances in league football across the following three seasons. Turraca scored his first senior goal in October 2018 versus Olimpo.

In July 2019, following Los Andes' relegation to the third tier, Turraca was loaned out to Primera B Nacional club Almagro. He appeared six times for them, before returning to his parent club in June 2020 and signing a new short-term contract. In January 2023, Turraca terminated his contract with Los Andes and signed for Aldosivi.

== Career statistics ==
As of 2 September 2020.

Appearances and goals by club, season and competition
Club	Season	League			Cup		Continental		Other		Total	
Club	Season	Division	Apps	Goals	Apps	Goals	Apps	Goals	Apps	Goals	Apps	Goals
Los Andes	2013–14	Primera B Metropolitana	0	0	0	0	—		0	0	0	0
Los Andes	2014	Primera B Metropolitana	0	0	0	0	—		0	0	0	0
Los Andes	2015	Primera B Nacional	0	0	1	0	—		0	0	1	0
Los Andes	2016	Primera B Nacional	3	0	0	0	—		0	0	3	0
Los Andes	2016–17	Primera B Nacional	42	0	1	0	—		0	0	43	0
Los Andes	2017–18	Primera B Nacional	22	0	0	0	—		0	0	22	0
Los Andes	2018–19	Primera B Nacional	23	1	0	0	—		0	0	23	1
Los Andes	2019–20	Primera B Metropolitana	0	0	0	0	—		0	0	0	0
Los Andes	Total		90	1	2	0	—		0	0	92	1
Almagro (loan)	2019–20	Primera B Nacional	6	0	0	0	—		0	0	6	0
Career total			96	1	2	0	—		0	0	98	1
