= Nahuel Basualdo =

Argentine professional footballer

Personal information
- Full name: Nahuel Oscar Basualdo
- Date of birth: 23 February 1991 (age 35)
- Place of birth: Buenos Aires, Argentina
- Height: 1.79 m (5 ft 10 in)
- Position: Right-back

Team information
- Current team: Defensores Unidos

Youth career
- Almagro

Senior career*
| Years | Team | Apps | (Gls) |
| 2013–2024 | Almagro | 182 | (7) |
| 2015 | → Defensores Unidos (loan) | 15 | (0) |
| 2016 | → Fénix (loan) | 7 | (1) |
| 2016 | → Atlético Uruguay (loan) | 2 | (0) |
| 2025– | Defensores Unidos | 7 | (0) |
- * Club domestic league appearances and goals as of 16:40, 30 July 2025 (UTC)

Nahuel Oscar Basualdo (born 23 February 1991) is an Argentine professional footballer who plays as a right-back for Defensores Unidos.

== Career ==
Basualdo's career began with Almagro. He made his professional debut against Brown in Primera B Metropolitana on 27 January 2013, prior to scoring his first goal in the following March during a 3–1 win over Platense. Overall, Basualdo made sixty-one appearances and scored twice in his first four seasons. In June 2015, Basualdo completed a loan move to Defensores Unidos of Primera C Metropolitana. Fifteen appearances followed. After returning to Almagro at the end of 2015, Basualdo was immediately loaned out to Primera B Metropolitana's Fénix. He scored once in seven fixtures for Fénix.

On 21 October 2016, Basualdo signed for Torneo Federal B club Atlético Uruguay on loan. His stay lasted two months, with the defender being selected on just two occasions.

== Career statistics ==
As of 12 November 2018.

Club statistics
| Club | Season | League | | | Cup (Note: Includes the Copa Argentina) | | League Cup | | Continental | | Other | | Total | |
| Club | Season | Division | Apps | Goals | Apps | Goals | Apps | Goals | Apps | Goals | Apps | Goals | Apps | Goals |
|---|---|---|---|---|---|---|---|---|---|---|---|---|---|---|
| Almagro | 2012–13 | Primera B Metropolitana | 18 | 1 | 0 | 0 | — | | — | | 4 (Note: Four appearances in the 2012–13 Primera B Metropolitana play-offs) | 0 | 22 | 1 |
| Almagro | 2013–14 | Primera B Metropolitana | 24 | 1 | 1 | 0 | — | | — | | 0 | 0 | 25 | 1 |
| Almagro | 2014 | Primera B Metropolitana | 7 | 0 | 0 | 0 | — | | — | | 0 | 0 | 7 | 0 |
| Almagro | 2015 | Primera B Metropolitana | 7 | 0 | 0 | 0 | — | | — | | 0 | 0 | 7 | 0 |
| Almagro | 2016 | Primera B Nacional | 0 | 0 | 0 | 0 | — | | — | | 0 | 0 | 0 | 0 |
| Almagro | 2016–17 | Primera B Nacional | 6 | 0 | 1 | 0 | — | | — | | 0 | 0 | 7 | 0 |
| Almagro | 2017–18 | Primera B Nacional | 2 | 0 | 0 | 0 | — | | — | | 0 | 0 | 2 | 0 |
| Almagro | 2018–19 | Primera B Nacional | 9 | 0 | 2 | 0 | — | | — | | 0 | 0 | 11 | 0 |
| Almagro | Total | | 73 | 2 | 4 | 0 | — | | — | | 4 | 0 | 81 | 2 |
| Defensores Unidos (loan) | 2015 | Primera C Metropolitana | 15 | 0 | 0 | 0 | — | | — | | 0 | 0 | 15 | 0 |
| Fénix (loan) | 2016 | Primera B Metropolitana | 7 | 1 | 0 | 0 | — | | — | | 0 | 0 | 7 | 1 |
| Atlético Uruguay (loan) | 2016 (C) | Torneo Federal B | 2 | 0 | 0 | 0 | — | | — | | 0 | 0 | 2 | 0 |
| Career total | | | 97 | 3 | 4 | 0 | — | | — | | 4 | 0 | 105 | 3 |
