= Maximiliano García =

Argentine footballer

Personal information
- Full name: Maximiliano Ariel García
- Date of birth: 25 January 1985 (age 41)
- Place of birth: Moreno, Argentina
- Height: 1.83 m (6 ft 0 in)
- Position: Centre-back

Youth career
- Almagro

Senior career*
Years	Team	Apps	(Gls)
2001–2002	Flandria	2	(0)
2003–2010	Leandro N. Alem	200	(19)
2010–2012	Deportivo Merlo	22	(0)
2013	Argentino	28	(0)
2013–2018	Los Andes	105	(5)
2018–2019	Almagro	23	(0)
2019–2020	Comunicaciones	16	(0)
2020–2021	Villa Dálmine	7	(0)
2021	Comunicaciones	38	(1)
- * Club domestic league appearances and goals as of 17:45, 4 September 2022 (UTC)

Maximiliano Ariel García (born 25 January 1985) is an Argentine professional footballer who plays as a centre-back.

== Career ==
García's career began in the system of Almagro, which preceded a move to Flandria of Primera B Metropolitana; two appearances followed. In 2003, García completed a move to Primera D Metropolitana's Leandro N. Alem. He remained with the club for seven years, departing in 2010 following nineteen goals in two hundred league appearances; ten goals in eighty-four games came from 2007 in Primera C Metropolitana. 2010 saw the defender join Primera B Nacional team Deportivo Merlo, with his first professional appearance in nine years arriving on 14 August 2010 versus Gimnasia y Esgrima. He was selected in a further twenty-one games.

In January 2013, García joined fourth tier Argentino. Seven months later, Primera B Metropolitana side Los Andes signed García. He scored his first pro goal during a win away to Deportivo Morón in August 2014, in a season that ended with promotion to Primera B Nacional. On 30 June 2018, after one hundred and ten appearances and six goals for Los Andes, García rejoined former youth team Almagro in Primera B Nacional. He'd appear in thirty matches in all competitions, which preceded a move to Comunicaciones of Primera B Metropolitana in July 2019. A year later, García penned terms with tier two team Villa Dálmine.

== Career statistics ==
As of 27 October 2020.

Club statistics
Club	Season	League			Cup		League Cup		Continental		Other		Total	
Club	Season	Division	Apps	Goals	Apps	Goals	Apps	Goals	Apps	Goals	Apps	Goals	Apps	Goals
Flandria	2001–02	Primera B Metropolitana	2	0	0	0	—		—		0	0	2	0
Deportivo Merlo	2010–11	Primera B Nacional	20	0	0	0	—		—		0	0	20	0
Deportivo Merlo	2011–12	Primera B Nacional	1	0	0	0	—		—		0	0	1	0
Deportivo Merlo	2012–13	Primera B Nacional	1	0	0	0	—		—		0	0	1	0
Deportivo Merlo	Total		22	0	0	0	—		—		0	0	22	0
Argentino	2012–13	Primera C Metropolitana	28	0	0	0	—		—		0	0	28	0
Los Andes	2013–14	Primera B Metropolitana	8	0	0	0	—		—		0	0	8	0
Los Andes	2014	Primera B Metropolitana	19	3	0	0	—		—		0	0	19	3
Los Andes	2015	Primera B Nacional	35	1	4	0	—		—		0	0	39	1
Los Andes	2016	Primera B Nacional	0	0	0	0	—		—		0	0	0	0
Los Andes	2016–17	Primera B Nacional	25	0	1	1	—		—		0	0	26	1
Los Andes	2017–18	Primera B Nacional	18	1	0	0	—		—		0	0	18	1
Los Andes	Total		105	5	5	1	—		—		0	0	110	6
Almagro	2018–19	Primera B Nacional	23	0	4	1	—		—		3 (Note: Appearance(s) in the Primera B Nacional play-offs)	0	30	1
Comunicaciones	2019–20	Primera B Metropolitana	16	0	0	0	—		—		0	0	16	0
Villa Dálmine	2020–21	Primera B Nacional	0	0	0	0	—		—		0	0	0	0
Career total			196	5	9	2	—		—		3	0	208	7
