= Lucas Bossio =

Argentine professional footballer

Personal information
- Date of birth: 6 March 1990 (age 36)
- Place of birth: Wenceslao Escalante, Argentina
- Height: 1.80 m (5 ft 11 in)
- Position: Midfielder

Team information
- Current team: Ellas Syros

Youth career
- Arsenal de Sarandí

Senior career*
Years	Team	Apps	(Gls)
2012–2013	Rivadavia	26	(0)
2013–2014	San Jorge	27	(0)
2014–2015	San Martín	41	(1)
2016	Chacarita Juniors	7	(0)
2016	San Jorge	13	(0)
2017	Sarmiento	6	(0)
2017–2018	San Martín	8	(0)
2018–2019	Guillermo Brown	21	(0)
2019–2020	Almagro	17	(0)
2020–2021	Niki Volos	22	(1)
2022	Carpi	2	(0)
2023	Iraklis Larissa	18	(0)
2023–	Ellas Syros		
- * Club domestic league appearances and goals as of 18:00, 17 June 2023 (UTC)

Lucas Bossio (born 6 March 1990) is an Argentine professional footballer who plays as a midfielder for Greek Gamma Ethniki club Ellas Syros.

== Career ==
Arsenal de Sarandí were a youth club of Bossio's, leaving the club in August 2012 to sign for Rivadavia. In his eleventh senior appearance, on 4 November, Bossio received his first red card against Alvarado. He featured in thirty-two matches in Torneo Argentino A for Rivadavia, before switching to San Jorge in 2013. Bossio remained in the third tier with San Martín ahead of the 2014 Torneo Federal A. He netted his first senior goal in May 2015 versus San Lorenzo. Primera B Nacional side Chacarita Juniors signed Bossio on 5 January 2016. Seven appearances came, including his bow on 18 March in a Central Córdoba draw.

Bossio dropped back down to Torneo Federal A after agreeing to rejoin San Jorge on 15 August. Five months later, the midfielder moved to Sarmiento where he participated nine times during 2016–17. Bossio spent the subsequent campaign back with San Miguel de Tucumán's San Martín, with them now playing in Primera B Nacional. He appeared ten times as the club won the promotion play-off finals over Sarmiento (J). Fellow second-tier team Guillermo Brown completed the signing of Bossio in July 2018. His first match was a home loss against Brown on 26 August. A move to Almagro occurred in July 2019.

After featuring twenty times in all competitions for Almagro, Bossio departed in August 2020 to Greek Football League club Niki Volos. On 28 January 2022, Bossio moved to Italian Serie D club Athletic Carpi.

== Career statistics ==
As of 30 September 2020.

Club statistics
Club	Season	League			Cup		League Cup		Continental		Other		Total	
Club	Season	Division	Apps	Goals	Apps	Goals	Apps	Goals	Apps	Goals	Apps	Goals	Apps	Goals
Rivadavia	2012–13	Torneo Argentino A	26	0	1	0	—		6 (Note: Appearance(s) in the Torneo Argentino A play-offs)	0	33	0		
San Jorge	2013–14	Torneo Argentino A	27	0	1	0	—		—		0	0	28	0
San Martín	2014	Torneo Federal A	14	0	1	0	—		—		0	0	15	0
San Martín	2015	Torneo Federal A	27	1	1	0	—		—		4 (Note: Appearance(s) in the Torneo Federal A play-offs)	0	32	1
San Martín	Total		41	1	2	0	—		—		4	0	47	1
Chacarita Juniors	2016	Primera B Nacional	7	0	0	0	—		—		0	0	7	0
San Jorge	2016–17	Torneo Federal A	13	0	0	0	—		—		0	0	13	0
Sarmiento	2016–17	Torneo Federal A	6	0	2	0	—		—		3	0	11	0
San Martín	2017–18	Primera B Nacional	8	0	0	0	—		—		2 (Note: Appearance(s) in the Primera B Nacional play-offs)	0	10	0
Guillermo Brown	2018–19	Primera B Nacional	21	0	0	0	—		—		0	0	21	0
Almagro	2019–20	Primera B Nacional	17	0	3	0	—		—		0	0	20	0
Niki Volos	2020–21	Football League	0	0	0	0	—		—		0	0	0	0
Career total			166	1	9	0	—		—		15	0	190	1
