= Darío Scatolaro =

Argentine footballer

Rubén Darío Enrique Scatolaro (born 3 February 1957 in Chajarí (Entre Ríos), Argentina), known as Darío Scatolaro, is an Argentine former professional footballer who played as a midfielder for clubs of Argentina, Chile and Spain.

== Clubs ==
- Boca Juniors 1979
- Real Murcia 1979–1980
- Real Oviedo 1980–1981
- Gimnasia LP 1982–1983
- Deportes La Serena 1984
- Magallanes 1985
- O'Higgins 1986–1988
- San Luis 1989–1990
- Deportes Arica 1991
- Coquimbo Unido 1992–1994
- Magallanes 1995
- Santa Teresa 1996

== Personal life ==
He is the father of the professional footballer Marcelo Scatolaro, who was born in San Bernardo, Santiago de Chile, when he played for Magallanes in Chile.

== Honours ==
O'Higgins

- Copa Apertura de la Segunda División de Chile (1): 1986

Magallanes

- Tercera División de Chile (1): 1995
