= Maximiliano Martínez (footballer, born September 1992) =

Argentine footballer

Personal information
- Full name: Maximiliano Ramón Martínez
- Date of birth: 1 September 1992 (age 34)
- Place of birth: San Miguel de Tucumán, Argentina
- Height: 1.78 m (5 ft 10 in)
- Position: Left-back

Team information
- Current team: Mitre

Youth career
- 2005–2008: Newell's Old Boys
- 2008–2011: San Martín Tucumán

Senior career*
Years	Team	Apps	(Gls)
2011–2019	San Martín Tucumán	76	(0)
2012–2013	→ Atlético Concepción (loan)	20	(1)
2015–2017	→ All Boys (loan)	69	(0)
2019–2020	San Martín SJ	0	(0)
2020–2021	San Martín Tucumán	60	(0)
2022–	Mitre	9	(0)
- * Club domestic league appearances and goals as of 18:59, 31 July 2022 (UTC)

Maximiliano Ramón Martínez (born 1 September 1992) is an Argentine professional footballer who plays as a left-back for Mitre.

== Career ==
Martínez's senior career began with San Martín (T), who signed him from Newell's Old Boys in 2008. Pedro Monzón promoted him into their first-team squad during the 2010–11 Primera B Nacional, in which competition he made his professional debut during a home loss to Instituto on 30 April 2011; having been an unused substitute on three previous occasions. San Martín were relegated to Torneo Argentino A in 2010–11, he subsequently made seventeen appearances which preceded a loan move to Torneo Argentino B's Atlético Concepción in 2012. He went on to play in twenty matches and score one goal.

He returned to San Martín a year later, prior to having two full seasons of action with them in Torneo Argentino A/Torneo Federal A. On 19 January 2015, Martínez joined All Boys of Primera B Nacional on loan. He would remain for three seasons, featuring in seventy-two fixtures. Martínez was back with his parent club for the 2017–18 Primera B Nacional campaign, which ended with promotion via the play-offs to the Primera División. His first appearance in top-flight football arrived against Unión Santa Fe on 20 August 2018. In July 2019, Martínez moved to San Martín's namesakes from San Juan.

However, Martínez never participated in a competitive match after picking up an injury, which required surgery, soon after signing. October 2020 saw Martínez return to San Miguel de Tucumán with former club San Martín.

== Career statistics ==
As of 28 October 2020.

Club statistics
Club	Season	League			Cup		League Cup		Continental		Other		Total	
Club	Season	Division	Apps	Goals	Apps	Goals	Apps	Goals	Apps	Goals	Apps	Goals	Apps	Goals
San Martín (T)	2010–11	Primera B Nacional	1	0	0	0	—		—		0	0	1	0
San Martín (T)	2011–12	Torneo Argentino A	17	0	0	0	—		—		0	0	17	0
San Martín (T)	2012–13	Torneo Argentino A	0	0	0	0	—		—		0	0	0	0
San Martín (T)	2013–14	Torneo Argentino A	16	0	1	0	—		—		3 (Note: Appearance(s) in the Torneo Argentino A play-offs)	0	20	0
San Martín (T)	2014	Torneo Federal A	12	0	2	0	—		—		0	0	14	0
San Martín (T)	2015	Torneo Federal A	0	0	0	0	—		—		0	0	0	0
San Martín (T)	2016	Torneo Federal A	0	0	0	0	—		—		0	0	0	0
San Martín (T)	2016–17	Primera B Nacional	0	0	0	0	—		—		0	0	0	0
San Martín (T)	2017–18	Primera B Nacional	16	0	0	0	—		—		5 (Note: Appearance(s) in the Primera B Nacional play-offs)	0	21	0
San Martín (T)	2018–19	Primera División	14	0	2	0	—		—		0	0	16	0
San Martín (T)	Total		76	0	5	0	—		—		8	0	89	0
Atlético Concepción (loan)	2012–13	Torneo Argentino B	20	1	0	0	—		—		0	0	20	1
All Boys (loan)	2015	Primera B Nacional	33	1	2	0	—		—		0	0	35	1
All Boys (loan)	2016	Primera B Nacional	18	0	0	0	—		—		0	0	18	0
All Boys (loan)	2016–17	Primera B Nacional	18	0	1	0	—		—		0	0	19	0
All Boys (loan)	Total		69	0	3	0	—		—		0	0	72	0
San Martín (SJ)	2019–20	Primera B Nacional	0	0	0	0	—		—		0	0	0	0
San Martín (T)	2020–21	Primera B Nacional	0	0	0	0	—		—		0	0	0	0
Career total			165	1	8	0	—		—		8	0	181	1
