= Arnaldo González =

Argentine footballer

Personal information
- Full name: Arnaldo González
- Date of birth: 13 May 1989 (age 37)
- Place of birth: Quilmes, Argentina
- Height: 1.73 m (5 ft 8 in)
- Position: Attacking midfielder

Team information
- Current team: Ciudad Bolívar

Youth career
- 2010–2011: Quilmes

Senior career*
Years	Team	Apps	(Gls)
2011–2012	Defensores de Belgrano	1	(0)
2012–2013	Santamarina	2	(1)
2013–2014	Quilmes	30	(4)
2015	Santamarina	12	(3)
2016	San Luis de Quillota	10	(1)
2016–2017	Patronato	13	(0)
2017	Central Córdoba (SdE)	6	(1)
2017–2018	Aldosivi	23	(3)
2018–2020	Nueva Chicago	28	(4)
2020–2021	Mitre (SdE)	12	(1)
2021–2023	Agropecuario	6	(1)
2023–2024	Guillermo Brown	28	(3)
2024–2025	Patronato	30	(4)
2025–	Ciudad Bolívar	33	(3)
- * Club domestic league appearances and goals as of 16:47, 25 April 2026 (UTC)

Arnaldo González (born May 13, 1989, in Quilmes, Buenos Aires, Argentina) is an Argentine professional footballer who plays as an attacking midfielder for Club Ciudad de Bolívar in the Primera Nacional of Argentina.

== Career ==
For the 2025 season, he became a player for Ciudad Bolívar, where he arrived after playing the last year in Patronato.

== Honours ==
Aldosivi

- Primera Nacional : 2017-18

Ciudad Bolívar

- Torneo Federal A : 2025
