= Germán Herrera (footballer, born 1993) =

Argentine footballer

Personal information
- Full name: Germán Andrés Herrera
- Date of birth: 5 February 1993 (age 33)
- Place of birth: Rosario, Argentina
- Height: 1.71 m (5 ft 7 in)
- Position: Attacking midfielder

Team information
- Current team: Ethnikos Piraeus

Youth career
- Boca Unidos

Senior career*
Years	Team	Apps	(Gls)
2014–2020	Boca Unidos	94	(2)
2018–2019	→ Brown de Adrogué (loan)	12	(0)
2019–2020	→ Almagro (loan)	9	(1)
2021	Olympiacos Volou	10	(0)
2021–2022	Panelefsiniakos	13	(5)
2022–2023	Apollon Smyrnis	25	(0)
2023	Panelefsiniakos	10	(3)
2024–26	Ethnikos Piraeus	54	(5)
- * Club domestic league appearances and goals as of 16 June 2023

Germán Andrés Herrera (born 5 February 1993) is an Argentine professional footballer who plays as an attacking midfielder for Gamma Ethniki club Ethnikos Piraeus.

== Honours ==
Ethnikos Piraeus

- Gamma Ethniki: 2025–26

== Career ==
Herrera started his career with Boca Unidos. Carlos Trullet promoted Herrera to the club's senior squad in the 2013–14 Primera B Nacional campaign, with the midfielder making his professional debut on 6 June 2014 during a defeat to San Martín. His first goal in first-team football arrived in March 2016 against Atlético Paraná, which was the first of two in a total of ninety-one appearances for them in Primera B Nacional. On 8 July 2018, following Boca Unidos' relegation to Torneo Federal A, Herrera completed a loan move to Brown of Primera B Nacional. He appeared fifteen times for them, prior to returning to his parent club.

In July 2019, Herrera was loaned to Almagro; another Primera B Nacional team. He scored on his second appearance, netting in a 1–1 draw away to Villa Dálmine.

On 16 January 2021, Herrera joined Greek Olympiacos Volos. At the end of August 2021, Herrera moved to Gamma Ethniki club Panelefsiniakos.

On 12 July 2024, Herrera signed for Ethnikos Piraeus.

== Career statistics ==
As of 31 August 2020.

Club statistics
Club	Season	League			Cup		League Cup		Continental		Other		Total	
Club	Season	Division	Apps	Goals	Apps	Goals	Apps	Goals	Apps	Goals	Apps	Goals	Apps	Goals
Boca Unidos	2013–14	Primera B Nacional	1	0	0	0	—		—		0	0	1	0
Boca Unidos	2014	Primera B Nacional	0	0	0	0	—		—		0	0	0	0
Boca Unidos	2015	Primera B Nacional	12	0	0	0	—		—		0	0	12	0
Boca Unidos	2016	Primera B Nacional	19	1	0	0	—		—		0	0	19	1
Boca Unidos	2016–17	Primera B Nacional	35	1	0	0	—		—		0	0	35	1
Boca Unidos	2017–18	Primera B Nacional	24	0	0	0	—		—		0	0	24	0
Boca Unidos	2018–19	Torneo Federal A	0	0	0	0	—		—		0	0	0	0
Boca Unidos	2019–20	Torneo Federal A	0	0	0	0	—		—		0	0	0	0
Boca Unidos	Total		91	2	0	0	—		—		0	0	91	2
Brown (loan)	2018–19	Primera B Nacional	12	0	1	0	—		—		2 (Note: Appearance(s) in the Primera B Nacional play-offs)	0	15	0
Almagro (loan)	2019–20	Primera B Nacional	9	1	2	0	—		—		0	0	11	1
Career total			112	2	3	0	—		—		2	0	117	2
