= Marcos Litre =

Argentine footballer

Personal information
- Full name: Marcos Esteban Litre
- Date of birth: 14 September 1988 (age 38)
- Place of birth: Pigüé, Argentina
- Height: 1.87 m (6 ft 1 1/2 in)
- Positions: Midfielder; forward

Team information
- Current team: Deportivo Santaní
- Number: 7

Youth career
- Sarmiento de Pigüe

Senior career*
Years	Team	Apps	(Gls)
2008–2012	Olimpo	41	(3)
2012	Gimnasia y Esgrima	0	(0)
2012–2013	Sarmiento de Pigüe	15	(11)
2013–2014	Juventud Antoniana	42	(3)
2015	Sarmiento de Pigüe		
2015	Villa Mitre	24	(9)
2016	Sol de América	12	(4)
2016–2017	Juventud Antoniana	23	(1)
2017–2018	Alvarado	21	(6)
2018–2019	Almagro	15	(1)
2019–	Deportivo Santaní	12	(1)
- * Club domestic league appearances and goals as of 20:47, 7 November 2019 (UTC)

Marcos Esteban Litre (born 14 September 1988) is an Argentine professional footballer who plays as a midfielder or forward for Deportivo Santaní.

== Career ==
Litre signed for Olimpo from Sarmiento de Pigüe, with the player making his professional debut for Olimpo on 13 September 2008 during a Primera B Nacional home victory over San Martín. He scored his first goal three weeks later against Tiro Federal. Olimpo won promotion to the Primera División in 2009–10, with Litre netting his first top-flight goal in April 2011 versus Colón. Litre left Olimpo in 2012, joining Gimnasia y Esgrima and subsequently former team Sarmiento de Pigüe. One year later, Litre completed a move to Torneo Argentino A's Juventud Antoniana. He scored four goals in forty-five matches across two seasons.

2015 saw Litre feature for Sarmiento de Pigüe (third spell) and Villa Mitre, which preceded a 2016 move to Sol de América. Four goals followed, including two against Sportivo Patria in April 2016. Litre rejoined Juventud Antoniana on 30 June 2016. After twenty-seven games and one goal, he departed for a second time in July 2017 after agreeing to join Alvarado. His first goal for the club arrived on 8 October against Deportivo Madryn, which was the first of six goals in the 2017–18 Torneo Federal A campaign. On 30 June 2018, Primera B Nacional side Almagro signed Litre. One goal in eighteen games in all competitions came.

In July 2019, Deportivo Santaní of the Paraguayan Primera División secured terms with Litre. He netted twice on his official bow, on 18 July in the Copa Paraguay over Sud América.

== Career statistics ==
As of 19 July 2019.

Club statistics
Club	Season	League			Cup		League Cup		Continental		Other		Total	
Club	Season	Division	Apps	Goals	Apps	Goals	Apps	Goals	Apps	Goals	Apps	Goals	Apps	Goals
Olimpo	2008–09	Primera B Nacional	20	2	0	0	—		—		0	0	20	2
Olimpo	2009–10	Primera B Nacional	0	0	0	0	—		—		0	0	0	0
Olimpo	2010–11	Argentine Primera División	6	1	0	0	—		—		0	0	6	1
Olimpo	2011–12	Argentine Primera División	15	0	3	1	—		—		0	0	18	1
Olimpo	Total		41	3	3	1	—		—		0	0	44	4
Gimnasia y Esgrima	2012–13	Torneo Argentino B	0	0	0	0	—		—		0	0	0	0
Sarmiento de Pigüe	2012–13	Liga Bahiense	15	11	0	0	—		—		0	0	15	11
Juventud Antoniana	2013–14	Torneo Argentino A	29	2	2	0	—		—		1 (Note: Appearance(s) in the Torneo Argentino A play-offs)	0	32	2
Juventud Antoniana	2014	Torneo Federal A	13	1	0	0	—		—		2 (Note: Appearance(s) in the Torneo Federal A play-offs)	1	15	2
Juventud Antoniana	Total		42	3	0	0	—		—		3	1	45	4
Villa Mitre	2015	Torneo Federal B	24	9	0	0	—		—		0	0	24	9
Sol de América	2016	Torneo Federal A	12	4	0	0	—		—		2	0	14	4
Juventud Antoniana	2016–17	Torneo Federal A	23	1	0	0	—		—		4	0	27	1
Alvarado	2017–18	Torneo Federal A	21	6	2	1	—		—		6	0	29	7
Almagro	2018–19	Primera B Nacional	15	1	3	0	—		—		0	0	18	1
Deportivo Santaní	2019	Paraguayan Primera División	0	0	0	0	—		0	0	0	0	0	0
Career total			193	38	13	2	—		0	0	15	1	221	41
