= Puh =

Puh is a Slovene surname, sometimes Germanized to 'Puch'. Notable people with the surname include:

- Dušan Puh (born 1951), Slovenian windsurfer
- Johann Puch (Janez Puh, 1862–1914), Slovenian inventor and mechanic

== See also ==
- Puch (disambiguation)
