= Agustín Coscia =

Argentine footballer

Personal information
- Date of birth: 8 April 1997 (age 29)
- Place of birth: Rosario, Argentina
- Height: 1.80 m (5 ft 11 in)
- Position: Forward

Team information
- Current team: Ruch Chorzów
- Number: 99

Youth career
- –2016: Rosario Central

Senior career*
Years	Team	Apps	(Gls)
2016–2019	Rosario Central	5	(0)
2019–2020	Almagro	16	(2)
2021–2022	Zamora	26	(4)
2022	Alzira	17	(9)
2022–2023	Tudelano	26	(12)
2023–2025	Hércules	56	(13)
2025–2026	Sabadell	36	(10)
2026–	Ruch Chorzów	0	(0)
- * Club domestic league appearances and goals as of 25 May 2026

Agustín Coscia (born 8 April 1997) is an Argentine professional footballer who plays as a forward for I liga club Ruch Chorzów.

== Career ==
Coscia is a youth exponent from Rosario Central. He made his league debut on 7 August 2016 against Defensa y Justicia, replacing Teófilo Gutiérrez after 73 minutes. Despite impressing with the reserve side in 2017, he still featured rarely with the first team before moving to Almagro in July 2019.

After departing Almagro in July 2020, Coscia spent six months without a club before moving to Spain with Segunda División B side Zamora on 21 January 2021. Exactly one year later, he terminated his link with the club, and immediately moved to Alzira in the Segunda División RFEF.

In the following two years, Coscia remained in the fourth division with Tudelano and Hércules, and helped the latter to achieve promotion to Primera Federación in 2024. On 17 July 2025, he was announced at Sabadell in that category, and was the club's top scorer in the season with ten goals as they achieved promotion to Segunda División.

On 8 September 2026, Coscia signed with Polish club Ruch Chorzów, playing in the second division, on a season-long deal with an extension option.
