= Marcelo Scatolaro =

Chilean footballer (born 1985)

Personal information
- Full name: Marcelo Andrés Scatolaro Gunther
- Date of birth: 3 August 1985 (age 41)
- Place of birth: San Bernardo, Santiago, Chile
- Height: 1.78 m (5 ft 10 in)
- Position: Midfielder

Team information
- Current team: Sportivo Italiano

Senior career*
| Years | Team | Apps | (Gls) |
| 2005–2006 | Platense | 36 | (3) |
| 2006–2007 | Comunicaciones | 37 | (5) |
| 2007–2008 | Atlanta | 37 | (2) |
| 2008–2010 | Platense | 23 | (2) |
| 2011 | San Martín SJ | 35 | (2) |
| 2011 | Huachipato | 7 | (0) |
| 2012–2014 | Rangers | 55 | (0) |
| 2014–2015 | Sarmiento | 27 | (3) |
| 2016 | Los Andes | 22 | (2) |
| 2016–2019 | Almagro | 48 | (7) |
| 2019–2021 | Comunicaciones | 54 | (4) |
| 2022– | Sportivo Italiano | 12 | (0) |
- * Club domestic league appearances and goals as of 17:03, 4 September 2022 (UTC)

Marcelo Andrés Scatolaro Gunther (born 3 August 1985) is a Chilean-Argentine footballer who plays for Sportivo Italiano as a midfielder. Scatolaro prefers to play with right foot.

== Personal life ==
Scatolaro holds dual Chilean-Argentine nationality since he was born in San Bernardo, Santiago de Chile, when his father, the former Argentine professional footballer Darío Scatolaro, played for Magallanes in Chile.

He is the owner of a gym called Savage Gym in Munro, Buenos Aires.

== Titles ==
=== Honours ===
Platense

- Primera B Metropolitana (1): 2005–06
