= Brian Benítez =

Argentine footballer

Personal information
- Full name: Brian Leonel Benítez
- Date of birth: 17 April 1996 (age 30)
- Place of birth: Ramos Mejía, Argentina
- Height: 1.73 m (5 ft 8 in)
- Position: Midfielder

Team information
- Current team: Anagennisi Karditsa
- Number: 20

Youth career
- San Lorenzo

Senior career*
Years	Team	Apps	(Gls)
2017–2019	San Lorenzo	0	(0)
2017–2018	→ Defensores (loan)	29	(0)
2018–2019	→ Almagro (loan)	13	(1)
2019–2020	Almagro	12	(1)
2020–2021	San Martín SJ	5	(0)
2021	San Telmo		
2021–2022	Ierapetra	27	(0)
2022–2023	Kalamata	13	(0)
2024	Aiolikos	14	(0)
2024	Sportivo Ameliano	13	(0)
2025	Cerro	7	(0)
2025–2026	Llaneros	21	(0)
2026–	Anagennisi Karditsa	0	(0)
- * Club domestic league appearances and goals as of 27 April 2026

Brian Leonel Benítez (born 17 April 1996) is an Argentine professional footballer who plays as a midfielder for Super League Greece 2 club Anagennisi Karditsa.

== Career ==
Benítez began his senior career with San Lorenzo of the Argentine Primera División. On 18 August 2017, Benítez was loaned to Primera B Metropolitana side Defensores de Belgrano. He made twenty-four appearances, including his professional career debut versus Sacachispas on 9 September, during the 2017–18 campaign as the club were promoted via the play-offs. Benítez was again loaned out in August 2018, this time to Almagro.

== Career statistics ==
As of 12 September 2018.

Club statistics
Club	Season	League			Cup (Note: Includes the Copa Argentina)		League Cup		Continental (Note: Includes the Copa Libertadores and Copa Sudamericana)		Other		Total	
Club	Season	Division	Apps	Goals	Apps	Goals	Apps	Goals	Apps	Goals	Apps	Goals	Apps	Goals
San Lorenzo	2017–18	Primera División	0	0	0	0	—		0	0	0	0	0	0
San Lorenzo	2018–19	Primera División	0	0	0	0	—		0	0	0	0	0	0
San Lorenzo	Total		0	0	0	0	—		0	0	0	0	0	0
Defensores de Belgrano (loan)	2017–18	Primera B Metropolitana	24	0	0	0	—		—		5 (Note: Five appearances in 2017–18 Primera B Metropolitana play-offs)	0	29	0
Almagro (loan)	2018–19	Primera B Nacional	0	0	0	0	—		—		0	0	0	0
Career total			24	0	0	0	—		0	0	5	0	29	0
