= Gonzalo Jaque =

Argentine footballer

Personal information
- Full name: Gonzalo José Jaque
- Date of birth: 5 December 1996 (age 29)
- Place of birth: José C. Paz, Argentina
- Height: 1.72 m (5 ft 8 in)
- Position: Midfielder

Team information
- Current team: Almagro

Youth career
- San Lorenzo

Senior career*
| Years | Team | Apps | (Gls) |
| 2017–2019 | San Lorenzo | 0 | (0) |
| 2017–2019 | → Defensores (loan) | 50 | (1) |
| 2019– | Almagro | 54 | (4) |
- * Club domestic league appearances and goals as of 19:03, 7 June 2022 (UTC)

Gonzalo José Jaque (born 5 December 1996) is an Argentine professional footballer who plays as a midfielder for Almagro.

== Career ==
San Lorenzo were Jaque's first senior club. They allowed him to depart on loan in August 2017, with Primera B Metropolitana side Defensores de Belgrano temporarily signing Jaque. He made his professional debut on 13 September versus Acassuso, prior to netting his first goal against Deportivo Español in November. In total, Jaque featured thirty-four times as the club won promotion to Primera B Nacional. His loan was subsequently extended for a further season on 22 July 2018. He returned to San Lorenzo in June 2019, before signing with Almagro days after.

== Career statistics ==
As of 1 September 2020.

Club statistics
| Club | Season | League | | | Cup | | League Cup | | Continental | | Other | | Total | |
| Club | Season | Division | Apps | Goals | Apps | Goals | Apps | Goals | Apps | Goals | Apps | Goals | Apps | Goals |
|---|---|---|---|---|---|---|---|---|---|---|---|---|---|---|
| San Lorenzo | 2017–18 | Primera División | 0 | 0 | 0 | 0 | — | | 0 | 0 | 0 | 0 | 0 | 0 |
| San Lorenzo | 2018–19 | Primera División | 0 | 0 | 0 | 0 | — | | 0 | 0 | 0 | 0 | 0 | 0 |
| San Lorenzo | 2019–20 | Primera División | 0 | 0 | 0 | 0 | — | | — | | 0 | 0 | 0 | 0 |
| San Lorenzo | Total | | 0 | 0 | 0 | 0 | — | | 0 | 0 | 0 | 0 | 0 | 0 |
| Defensores de Belgrano (loan) | 2017–18 | Primera B Metropolitana | 29 | 1 | 0 | 0 | — | | — | | 5 (Note: Appearance(s) in the Primera B Metropolitana play-offs) | 0 | 34 | 1 |
| Defensores de Belgrano (loan) | 2018–19 | Primera B Nacional | 21 | 0 | 1 | 0 | — | | — | | 0 | 0 | 22 | 0 |
| Defensores de Belgrano (loan) | Total | | 50 | 1 | 1 | 0 | — | | — | | 5 | 0 | 56 | 1 |
| Almagro (loan) | 2019–20 | Primera B Nacional | 11 | 0 | 1 | 0 | — | | — | | 0 | 0 | 12 | 0 |
| Career total | | | 61 | 1 | 2 | 0 | — | | 0 | 0 | 5 | 0 | 68 | 1 |
