= Christian Limousin =

Argentine footballer

Personal information
- Full name: Christian Gonzalo Limousin
- Date of birth: 29 November 1991 (age 34)
- Place of birth: Buenos Aires, Argentina
- Height: 1.82 m (5 ft 11 1/2 in)
- Position: Goalkeeper

Team information
- Current team: Almagro

Youth career
- Ferro Carril Oeste

Senior career*
Years	Team	Apps	(Gls)
2011–2016	Ferro Carril Oeste	59	(0)
2016–2018	Almagro	68	(0)
2018–2019	Gimnasia y Esgrima	4	(0)
2019	Técnico Universitario	5	(0)
2019–2020	Almagro	15	(0)
2021–2023	Cantolao	91	(0)
2024–	Almagro	21	(0)
- * Club domestic league appearances and goals as of 18:16, 28 June 2025 (UTC)

Christian Gonzalo Limousin (born 29 November 1991) is an Argentine professional footballer who plays as a goalkeeper for Almagro.

== Career ==
Ferro Carril Oeste were Limousin's first team. Mario Gómez was the manager who promoted Limousin into their senior squad, with the goalkeeper appearing on the substitute's bench nine times before making his professional debut on 18 June 2011 against Unión Santa Fe in Primera B Nacional. His tenure with the club lasted a total of seven seasons, with Limousin appearing sixty-three times in all competitions. Fellow second tier side Almagro completed the signing of Limousin on 7 July 2016. Forty-three appearances came in his first season, which preceded twenty-six in 2017–18 as they lost in the championship play-off.

On 30 June 2018, Limousin joined Gimnasia y Esgrima. He made his bow for them on 29 July in the Copa Argentina round of sixty-four, as Gimnasia y Esgrima were eliminated by his former club Almagro. Limousin moved to Ecuador's Técnico Universitario on 13 January 2019. He left in the succeeding July, having played five matches in Serie A. On 8 July, Limousin sealed a return to Almagro. He departed twelve months later, following eighteen appearances. In January 2021, Limousin headed to Peru with Cantolao.

== Career statistics ==
As of 10 January 2021.

Club statistics
Club	Season	League			Cup		League Cup		Continental		Other		Total	
Club	Season	Division	Apps	Goals	Apps	Goals	Apps	Goals	Apps	Goals	Apps	Goals	Apps	Goals
Ferro Carril Oeste	2010–11	Primera B Nacional	1	0	0	0	—		—		0	0	1	0
Ferro Carril Oeste	2011–12	Primera B Nacional	2	0	0	0	—		—		0	0	2	0
Ferro Carril Oeste	2012–13	Primera B Nacional	2	0	0	0	—		—		0	0	2	0
Ferro Carril Oeste	2013–14	Primera B Nacional	12	0	0	0	—		—		0	0	12	0
Ferro Carril Oeste	2014	Primera B Nacional	3	0	0	0	—		—		0	0	3	0
Ferro Carril Oeste	2015	Primera B Nacional	27	0	2	0	—		—		2 (Note: Appearance(s) in the Primera B Nacional play-offs)	0	31	0
Ferro Carril Oeste	2016	Primera B Nacional	12	0	0	0	—		—		0	0	21	0
Ferro Carril Oeste	Total		59	0	2	0	—		—		2	0	63	0
Almagro	2016–17	Primera B Nacional	42	0	1	0	—		—		0	0	43	0
Almagro	2017–18	Primera B Nacional	26	0	0	0	—		—		0	0	26	0
Almagro	Total		68	0	1	0	—		—		0	0	69	0
Gimnasia y Esgrima	2018–19	Primera B Nacional	4	0	1	0	—		—		0	0	5	0
Técnico Universitario	2019	Serie A	5	0	0	0	—		—		0	0	5	0
Almagro	2019–20	Primera B Nacional	15	0	3	0	—		—		0	0	18	0
Cantolao	2021	Peruvian Primera División	0	0	0	0	—		—		0	0	0	0
Career total			151	0	7	0	—		—		2	0	160	0
