= Ezequiel Denis =

Argentine footballer (born 1996)

Personal information
- Full name: Ezequiel Alexander Denis
- Date of birth: 4 April 1996 (age 30)
- Place of birth: General Pico, Argentina
- Height: 1.70 m (5 ft 7 in)
- Position: Forward

Team information
- Current team: Real España
- Number: 23

Youth career
- Ferro de Alvear
- Independiente (GP)
- 2011–2017: Independiente

Senior career*
Years	Team	Apps	(Gls)
2017–2021	Independiente	1	(1)
2018–2020	→ Almagro (loan)	25	(3)
2020	→ General Díaz (loan)	0	(0)
2021	San Martín SJ	14	(0)
2022–	Real España	14	(1)
- * Club domestic league appearances and goals as of 19:15, 7 June 2022 (UTC)

Ezequiel Alexander Denis (born 4 April 1996) is an Argentine professional footballer who plays as a forward for Real España.

== Career ==
Denis had spells with Ferro de Alvear and Independiente (GP) in his youth career, prior to joining Independiente of Avellaneda in 2011 and making the step into senior football in 2017. He was promoted into the club's first-team squad towards the end of 2017, being an unused substitute for an Argentine Primera División match with Racing Club on 25 November. On 9 December, Denis came off the substitute's bench in a league match with Arsenal de Sarandí to make his professional debut and subsequently scored a stoppage time winner in a 1–2 victory. He was loaned to Almagro of Primera B Nacional in July 2018.

Denis remained with Almagro for two seasons, scoring goals against Central Córdoba, Temperley and Quilmes across thirty-two total appearances. Denis returned to Independiente in June 2020, before departing on loan to Paraguayan Primera División side General Díaz in the succeeding October. However, in early November, Denis terminated his deal after not featuring. On 3 February 2021, Denis terminated his contract in order to join Primera B Nacional's San Martín.

In January 2022, Denis moved to Honduran club Real C.D. España.

== Career statistics ==
As of 4 February 2021.

Club statistics
Club	Season	League			Cup		League Cup		Continental		Other		Total	
Club	Season	Division	Apps	Goals	Apps	Goals	Apps	Goals	Apps	Goals	Apps	Goals	Apps	Goals
Independiente	2017–18	Argentine Primera División	1	1	0	0	—		0	0	0	0	1	1
Independiente	2018–19	Argentine Primera División	0	0	0	0	0	0	0	0	0	0	0	0
Independiente	2019–20	Argentine Primera División	0	0	0	0	0	0	0	0	0	0	0	0
Independiente	2020–21	Argentine Primera División	0	0	0	0	0	0	0	0	0	0	0	0
Independiente	Total		1	1	0	0	0	0	0	0	0	0	1	1
Almagro (loan)	2018–19	Primera B Nacional	12	2	1	0	—		—		3 (Note: Appearance(s) in the Primera B Nacional play-offs)	0	16	2
Almagro (loan)	2019–20	Primera B Nacional	13	1	3	0	—		—		0	0	16	1
Almagro (loan)	Total		25	3	4	0	—		—		3	0	32	3
General Díaz (loan)	2020	Paraguayan Primera División	0	0	0	0	—		—		0	0	0	0
San Martín	2021	Primera B Nacional	0	0	0	0	—		—		0	0	0	0
Career total			26	4	4	0	0	0	0	0	3	0	33	3
