= Sebastián Diana =

Uruguayan footballer (born 1990)

Personal information
- Full name: Sebastián Roberto Diana Suárez
- Date of birth: 2 August 1990 (age 36)
- Place of birth: Montevideo, Uruguay
- Height: 1.82 m (6 ft 0 in)
- Position: Centre-back

Team information
- Current team: Deportivo Maldonado
- Number: 23

Youth career
- Danubio

Senior career*
Years	Team	Apps	(Gls)
2010–2011	Danubio	15	(0)
2011–2012	El Tanque Sisley	4	(0)
2012–2013	Unión Temuco	7	(0)
2013–2014	Deportes Temuco	28	(0)
2015	Santiago Morning	2	(0)
2015	Saprissa	17	(3)
2015–2016	Torque	12	(0)
2016–2017	Villa Teresa	20	(0)
2017–2019	Crucero del Norte	48	(1)
2019–2020	Almagro	16	(0)
2020–2022	Racing de Montevideo	68	(2)
2023	Fénix	13	(0)
2024–	Deportivo Maldonado	12	(0)
- * Club domestic league appearances and goals as of 27 July 2024

Sebastián Roberto Diana Suárez (born 2 August 1990) is an Uruguayan footballer who plays as a centre-back for Deportivo Maldonado.
