= Horacio Ramírez (footballer) =

Argentine footballer

Horacio Ramirez
Personal information
- Full name: Horacio Martín Ramírez Esquivel
- Date of birth: March 21, 1984 (age 42)
- Place of birth: Posadas, Argentina
- Height: 1.85 m (6 ft 1 in)
- Position: Goalkeeper

Team information
- Current team: Brown de Adrogué

Youth career
- Lanús

Senior career*
Years	Team	Apps	(Gls)
2004–2007	Lanús	1	(0)
2007–2008	Flandria	40	(0)
2008–2009	Atlanta	15	(0)
2009–2010	Bolognesi	38	(0)
2010	Flandria		
2010–2011	Barracas Central	0	(0)
2011–2012	Colegiales	40	(0)
2012–2014	Tristán Suárez	74	(0)
2014–2015	Crucero del Norte	24	(0)
2016	Gimnasia de Jujuy	3	(0)
2016–2017	Quilmes	1	(0)
2017–2019	Almagro	27	(0)
2019	Unión Magdalena	17	(0)
2020–2021	Almagro	43	(0)
2022–	Brown de Adrogué	20	(0)
- * Club domestic league appearances and goals as of 18:55, 29 June 2022 (UTC)

Horacio Martín Ramírez Esquivel (born March 21, 1984, in Posadas, Argentina) is an Argentine goalkeeper who plays for Brown de Adrogué.

He previously played in the Argentine Primera División with Club Atlético Lanús, Crucero del Norte and Quilmes Atlético Club.

== Club career ==
Ramírez played youth football with Luz y Fuerza before his former coach, Rubén Kleyser, signed him to a professional contract with Primera División club Lanús.

After failing to feature regularly for Lanús, Ramírez joined Club Social y Deportivo Flandria where he made 40 appearances in the 2007–08 Primera B Metropolitana season.

Ramírez had a one-year stint with Peruvian side Bolognesi before signing to Barracas Central for the 2010-11 Primera B Metropolitana season. He led Club Atlético Colegiales to a runner's up finish in the 2011–12 Primera Metropolitana season.
