= Mariano Puch =

Argentine footballer

Personal information
- Full name: Mariano Damián Puch
- Date of birth: 13 August 1990 (age 36)
- Place of birth: Francisco Álvarez, Argentina
- Height: 1.81 m (5 ft 11 1/2 in)
- Position: Midfielder

Team information
- Current team: Flandria

Senior career*
Years	Team	Apps	(Gls)
2010–2011	Flandria	2	(0)
2011–2014	Fénix	83	(11)
2014	Atlanta	20	(0)
2015	Nueva Chicago	22	(0)
2016	Gimnasia y Esgrima	6	(0)
2016	Atlético de Rafaela	1	(0)
2017	Los Andes	8	(1)
2017–2018	Flandria	20	(1)
2018–2019	Almagro	13	(0)
2019–2020	Comunicaciones	17	(0)
2020–	Flandria	51	(1)
- * Club domestic league appearances and goals as of 20:26, 18 July 2022 (UTC)

Mariano Damián Puch (born 13 August 1990) is an Argentine professional footballer who plays as a midfielder for Flandria.

== Career ==
Puch started his career with Flandria of Primera B Metropolitana, he made two appearances before joining Primera D Metropolitana club Fénix and going on to score eleven goals in eight-three appearances as the club won back-to-back promotions. Spells with Atlanta, Nueva Chicago and Gimnasia y Esgrima followed before Puch joined Argentine Primera División team Atlético de Rafaela. However, after just one appearance, Puch departed the club in 2017 to join Primera B Nacional side Los Andes. After one goal in eight games during 2016–17, Puch left to rejoin Flandria ahead of the 2017–18 Primera B Nacional.

His Flandria debut came versus Juventud Unida on 17 September. Puch scored his first Flandria goal in his twelfth appearance, on 17 February 2018 against Sarmiento. June 2018 saw Puch complete a move to Almagro. Twelve months later, the midfielder joined Comunicaciones. He made a total of thirty-three appearances for those two clubs. In August 2020, Puch headed to Flandria; for a third spell with them.

== Career statistics ==
As of 9 October 2020.

Club statistics
Club	Season	League			Cup		League Cup		Continental		Other		Total	
Club	Season	Division	Apps	Goals	Apps	Goals	Apps	Goals	Apps	Goals	Apps	Goals	Apps	Goals
Flandria	2010–11	Primera B Metropolitana	2	0	0	0	—		—		0	0	2	0
Fénix	2011–12	Primera D Metropolitana	22	3	0	0	—		—		0	0	22	3
Fénix	2012–13	Primera C Metropolitana	24	2	0	0	—		—		0	0	24	2
Fénix	2013–14	Primera B Metropolitana	37	6	2	0	—		—		0	0	39	6
Fénix	Total		83	11	2	0	—		—		0	0	85	11
Atlanta	2014	Primera B Metropolitana	20	0	0	0	—		—		0	0	20	0
Nueva Chicago	2015	Primera División	22	0	0	0	—		—		0	0	22	0
Gimnasia y Esgrima	2016	Torneo Federal A	6	0	0	0	—		—		0	0	6	0
Atlético de Rafaela	2016–17	Primera División	1	0	0	0	—		—		0	0	1	0
Los Andes	2016–17	Primera B Nacional	8	1	0	0	—		—		0	0	8	1
Flandria	2017–18	Primera B Nacional	20	1	0	0	—		—		0	0	20	1
Almagro	2018–19	Primera B Nacional	13	0	3	0	—		—		0	0	16	0
Comunicaciones	2019–20	Primera B Metropolitana	17	0	0	0	—		—		0	0	17	0
Flandria	2020–21	Primera B Metropolitana	0	0	0	0	—		—		0	0	0	0
Career total			190	13	5	0	—		—		0	0	195	13

== Honours ==
Fénix

- Primera D Metropolitana: 2011–12
