= Calvino Noir =

2015 stealth video game

- Developers: Calvino Noir, Ltd.
- Publishers: Calvino Noir, Ltd.
- Platforms: PlayStation 4, iOS, Microsoft Windows, OS X
- Release: PlayStation 4 August 25, 2015 iOS, Windows, OS X August 27, 2015
- Genre: Stealth
- Mode: Single-player

Calvino Noir is a stealth game developed and published by Calvino Noir, Ltd. It was released on August 25, 2015, for PlayStation 4, and August 27, 2015, for iOS, Microsoft Windows, and OS X.

It received a mixed reception from critics, who enjoyed its distinctive film noir art style but criticized its gameplay, such as stealth mechanics and controls.

== Gameplay ==
The main character is a "scrambler", or spy, who must evade various guards. The player must hide and sneak around to avoid being spotted by enemies or being lit up by their flashlights.

== Plot ==
The game takes place in 1930s Europe, where the main character delves into the criminal underworld. The game's narrator narrates every written word of the game.

== Reception ==
The game received a mixed reception, with an aggregate score of 55/100 for the PC version and 44/100 for the PS4 version.

Tom Christiansen of Gamezebo called the game "too difficult" and said that this difficulty was fueled by "inconsistency" where sometimes hiding spots would not work.

Natalie Collazo of Hardcore Gamer said that while the game was "visually beautiful", its stealth mechanics "[don't] really work" and are "frustrating".

Megan Logan of Wired commended the game's art style, calling it "stunning". Ben Barrett of Rock, Paper, Shotgun also said that the art "oozes class".
