= Fermín Holgado =

Argentine footballer

Personal information
- Full name: Fermín Holgado Guerediaga
- Date of birth: 17 May 1994 (age 32)
- Place of birth: Trenque Lauquen, Argentina
- Height: 1.96 m (6 ft 5 in)
- Position: Goalkeeper

Team information
- Current team: San Cristóbal
- Number: 1

Youth career
- Trenque Lauquen
- 2009–2012: Gimnasia y Esgrima
- 2012–2015: Arsenal de Sarandí

Senior career*
Years	Team	Apps	(Gls)
2015	Central Córdoba	0	(0)
2015–2017	El Palo	25	(0)
2017–2018	Almirante Brown	0	(0)
2018–2019	Olimpo	19	(0)
2019–2020	Almagro	0	(0)
2020–2021	Sant Julià	18	(0)
2022–	San Cristóbal	2	(0)
- * Club domestic league appearances and goals as of 20:34, 6 June 2022 (UTC)

Fermín Holgado Guerediaga (born 17 May 1994) is an Argentine professional footballer who plays as a goalkeeper for CP San Cristóbal.

== Career ==
Holgado had youth stints with Trenque Lauquen, Gimnasia y Esgrima and Arsenal de Sarandí. In 2015, after a stint with Central Córdoba, Holgado moved to Spanish football by signing with El Palo in the Tercera División. He stayed for the 2015–16 and 2016–17 campaigns in the third tier, making twenty-five appearances as they secured fifth and eighth-place finishes. 2017 saw Holgado return to Argentina with Almirante Brown. Having not played in the 2017–18 season in Primera B Metropolitana, Holgado switched to Primera B Nacional's Olimpo. He made his debut on 16 September 2018 during a win over Ferro Carril Oeste.

In his sixth appearance for Olimpo, in November, Holgado was sent off during a draw away to former team Central Córdoba. July 2019 saw Holgado move to fellow second-tier club Almagro. He remained for the shortened 2019–20, though didn't make a competitive appearance; appearing on the bench fourteen times across league and cup. In 2020, Holgado made a return to Europe with Andorran Primera Divisió side Sant Julià. He made his debut in a 2–1 win over Atlètic d'Escaldes on 16 December.

At the end of January 2022, Holgado moved to Spanish Tercera División RFEF club CP San Cristóbal.

== Career statistics ==
As of 29 December 2020.

Appearances and goals by club, season and competition
Club	Season	League			Cup		League Cup		Continental		Other		Total	
Club	Season	Division	Apps	Goals	Apps	Goals	Apps	Goals	Apps	Goals	Apps	Goals	Apps	Goals
Central Córdoba	2015	Primera B Nacional	0	0	0	0	—		—		0	0	0	0
El Palo	2015–16	Tercera División	11	0	0	0	—		—		0	0	11	0
El Palo	2016–17	Tercera División	14	0	0	0	—		—		0	0	14	0
El Palo	Total		25	0	0	0	—		—		0	0	25	0
Almirante Brown	2017–18	Primera B Metropolitana	0	0	0	0	—		—		0	0	0	0
Olimpo	2018–19	Primera B Nacional	19	0	0	0	—		—		0	0	19	0
Almagro	2019–20	Primera B Nacional	0	0	0	0	—		—		0	0	0	0
Sant Julià	2020–21	Primera Divisió	2	0	0	0	—		—		0	0	2	0
Career total			46	0	0	0	—		—		0	0	46	0
