= Calvino (surname) =

Calvino is an Italian surname. Notable people with the surname include:

- Italo Calvino, Italian journalist and writer
- Jo Calvino, British weightlifter
- Vincent Calvino, fictional character
- Vittorio Calvino (1909–1956), Italian journalist, screenwriter and writer

== See also ==
- Calviño
