= Lucas Calviño =

Argentine footballer

Personal information
- Date of birth: 8 November 1984 (age 42)
- Place of birth: Avellaneda, Argentina
- Height: 1.87 m (6 ft 2 in)
- Position: Goalkeeper

Youth career
- Gimnasia de Mendoza

Senior career*
Years	Team	Apps	(Gls)
2003–2005	Gimnasia de Mendoza	–	(–)
2005	San Miguel	–	(–)
2006–2008	Almagro	1	(0)
2008–2012	Huracán	31	(0)
2012	Santiago Morning	7	(0)
2013	Defensores de Belgrano	13	(0)
2013–2014	Atlético Tucumán	8	(0)
2015–2017	Central Córdoba SdE	71	(0)
2017	Deportivo Español	15	(0)
2018–2019	Almagro	4	(0)

Managerial career
- 2020–2021: Colón (gk coach)
- 2022: Independiente (gk coach)
- * Club domestic league appearances and goals

Lucas Calviño (born 8 November 1984) is an Argentine former professional footballer who played as a goalkeeper. He has served as a goalkeeping coach.

== Playing career ==
Besides Argentina, Calviño played in Chile for Santiago Morning in the second half of 2012.

== Coaching career ==
On 11 March 2020, Calviño was appointed goalkeeper coach of Colón under newly appointed manager Eduardo Domínguez, who Calviño played together with at Huracán. Manager Domínguez left the club at the end of 2021 together with his staff, including Calviño.
