= Francisco Del Riego =

Argentine professional footballer

Personal information
- Full name: Francisco Javier Del Riego Flores
- Date of birth: 24 March 1993 (age 33)
- Place of birth: América, Argentina
- Height: 1.82 m (5 ft 11 1/2 in)
- Position: Goalkeeper

Team information
- Current team: Almagro

Youth career
- Atlético Rivadavia
- Gimnasia y Esgrima

Senior career*
| Years | Team | Apps | (Gls) |
| 2014–2017 | Villa San Carlos | 53 | (0) |
| 2017–2018 | Sportivo Patria | 23 | (0) |
| 2018–2019 | Almagro | 0 | (0) |
| 2019–2020 | Ferro Carril Oeste | 21 | (0) |
| 2020–2022 | Almagro | 0 | (0) |
- * Club domestic league appearances and goals as of 10:08, 27 August 2020 (UTC)

Francisco Javier Del Riego Flores (born 24 March 1993) is an Argentine professional footballer who plays as a goalkeeper for Almagro.

== Career ==
Del Riego began in the ranks of Atlético Rivadavia, which preceded a move to Gimnasia y Esgrima. His first senior career club was Villa San Carlos. He was promoted into their first-team squad in October 2014, making five appearances including his debut against Deportivo Morón on 2 October. Del Riego remained for three further seasons whilst featuring in forty-nine fixtures, prior to departing on 30 June 2017 after agreeing to sign for Sportivo Patria of Torneo Federal A. He was selected twenty-three times by the club in the 2017–18 campaign. In August 2018, Del Riego joined Primera B Nacional side Almagro.

After no appearances for Almagro, Del Riego headed to Torneo Federal A with Ferro Carril Oeste in July 2019. After debuting in a draw away to Cipolletti on 1 September, he went on to appear twenty-three times in all competitions for the General Pico club. Del Riego, on 9 August 2020, sealed a return to Almagro.

== Career statistics ==
As of 27 August 2020.

Club statistics
| Club | Season | League | | | Cup | | League Cup | | Continental | | Other | | Total | |
| Club | Season | Division | Apps | Goals | Apps | Goals | Apps | Goals | Apps | Goals | Apps | Goals | Apps | Goals |
|---|---|---|---|---|---|---|---|---|---|---|---|---|---|---|
| Villa San Carlos | 2014 | Primera B Metropolitana | 5 | 0 | 0 | 0 | — | | — | | 0 | 0 | 5 | 0 |
| Villa San Carlos | 2015 | Primera B Metropolitana | 27 | 0 | 1 | 0 | — | | — | | 0 | 0 | 28 | 0 |
| Villa San Carlos | 2016 | Primera B Metropolitana | 6 | 0 | 0 | 0 | — | | — | | 0 | 0 | 6 | 0 |
| Villa San Carlos | 2016–17 | Primera B Metropolitana | 15 | 0 | 0 | 0 | — | | — | | 0 | 0 | 15 | 0 |
| Villa San Carlos | Total | | 53 | 0 | 1 | 0 | — | | — | | 0 | 0 | 54 | 0 |
| Sportivo Patria | 2017–18 | Torneo Federal A | 23 | 0 | 0 | 0 | — | | — | | 0 | 0 | 23 | 0 |
| Almagro | 2018–19 | Primera B Nacional | 0 | 0 | 0 | 0 | — | | — | | 0 | 0 | 0 | 0 |
| Ferro Carril Oeste | 2019–20 | Torneo Federal A | 21 | 0 | 2 | 0 | — | | — | | 0 | 0 | 23 | 0 |
| Almagro | 2020–21 | Primera B Nacional | 0 | 0 | 0 | 0 | — | | — | | 0 | 0 | 0 | 0 |
| Career total | | | 97 | 0 | 3 | 0 | — | | — | | 0 | 0 | 100 | 0 |
