= Ramiro Arias =

Argentine footballer

Personal information
- Full name: Ramiro Ezequiel Arias
- Date of birth: January 6, 1993 (age 33)
- Place of birth: Trelew, Argentina
- Height: 1.70 m (5 ft 7 in)
- Position: Left-back

Team information
- Current team: Villa Dálmine

Youth career
- San Lorenzo

Senior career*
Years	Team	Apps	(Gls)
2014–2017	San Lorenzo	5	(0)
2016–2017	→ Aldosivi (loan)	26	(0)
2017–2018	Sarmiento	29	(1)
2019–2020	Almagro	30	(1)
2020–2021	Quilmes	27	(0)
2022	Instituto	12	(0)
2022–	Villa Dálmine	6	(0)
- * Club domestic league appearances and goals as of 19:15, 25 July 2022 (UTC)

Ramiro Ezequiel Arias (born 6 January 1993) is an Argentine footballer who currently plays for Villa Dálmine, as a left-back.

== Career ==
He made his senior debut in Primera División for San Lorenzo on March 9, 2014, against Godoy Cruz.
