= María Rosa Calviño de Gómez =

Argentine politician

National Senator
- In office 1952–1955
- Constituency: City of Buenos Aires

Personal details
- Born: Buenos Aires

María Rosa Calviño de Gómez was an Argentine politician. She was elected to the Senate in 1951 as one of the first group of female parliamentarians in Argentina.

== Biography ==
Calviño was born in Buenos Aires and became a secondary school teacher. She married Alberto Manuel Gómez and had two sons.

In the 1951 legislative elections Calviño was a Peronist Party candidate and one of six women elected to the Senate, Representing the Federal Capital, she became chair of the Education Committee and sat on the Budget and Finance Committee and the Municipal Committee. The following year she was appointed secretary general of the Eva Perón Foundation. She remained a senator until the Revolución Libertadora in 1955.
