= Posuj =

Posuj پسوج
- Village
- Location within Iran
- Coordinates: 33°00′50″N 59°18′02″E
- Country: Iran
- Province: South Khorasan
- County: Birjand
- Bakhsh: Central
- Rural District: Alqurat

Population (2006)
  - Total: 72
- Time zone: UTC+3:30 (IRST)
  - Summer (DST): UTC+4:30 (IRDT)

Posuj (Persian: پسوج, also Romanized as Posūj and Pasūj; also known as Posūch, Pasūch, Pasuk, Pūch, and Seyyedābād) is a village in Alqurat Rural District, in the Central District of Birjand County, South Khorasan Province, Iran. At the 2006 census, its population was 72, in 27 families.
