= Estadio Almagro =

Football stadium in José Ingenieros, Argentina

Coordinates: 34°36′51″S 58°32′06″W

Tres de Febrero Stadium
- Estadio Tres de Febrero
- Estadio de Almagro
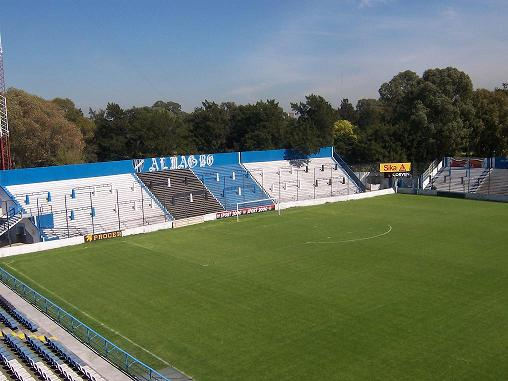
- Interactive map of Tres de Febrero Stadium
- Address: Av. Marcelo T. de Alvear 2223; José Ingenieros; Argentina
- Capacity: 13,000
- Surface: Grass
- Field size: 105 x 67 m

Construction
- Opened: 7 April 1956; 70 years ago
- Renovated: 2000

Tenant
- Almagro

Estadio Tres de Febrero is a stadium located in the José Ingenieros district of Tres de Febrero Partido in Argentina. It is owned and operated by Club Almagro. The venue was inaugurated in 1956, and refurbished in 2000, the same year Almagro promoted to Primera División.

The stadium has a capacity of 13,000 spectators.

== History ==
=== Background ===
Since its foundation, Almagro played in different venues, most of them in the city of Buenos Aires. The first venue was located on Ricardo Frías and Villa Lynch streets in Sáenz Peña near the railway station of Buenos Aires and Pacific Railway. Nevertheless the club had to move to Buenos Aires city where it rented a land on Avenida Gaona 102 in Parque Centenario. Almagro hosted their home venues there from 1920 to 1927.

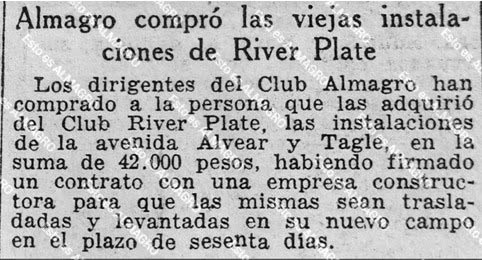
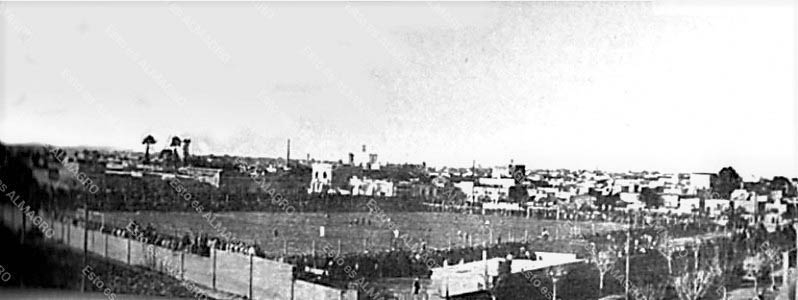
Left: Almagro bought the former grandstands of River Plate, reported on a newspaper; right: view of the stadium on Fraga and Estomba

The club then played in Parque Chas, in a land on Gándara and Londres streets that belonged to the Chas family. That venue was one of the stadiums with most capacity in the city, and apart from football matches, other events were held there. Almagro remained there until 1937, when the club had to leave the lands after the Municipality evicted them to open a street. After that, the club settled on Fraga and Estomba streets in Villa Ortúzar, where it played from 1939 to 1949. The club acquired the former grandstands of Estadio Alvear y Tagle to C.A. River Plate for m$n42,000.

=== José Ingenieros ===
Finally Almagro built its own stadium, located in José Ingenieros in Tres de Febrero partido. The field was inaugurated on 7 April 1956. The stadium would be remodeled in several occasions, but the most important was in 2000 after the team promoted to Primera División. The club had to expand the stadium's capacity to fulfill the AFA requirements.

Other refurbishments were made after that, such as the construction of new ticket boxes far from the entrance, after a requirement from local security agencies to prevent agglomerations or other incidents.

== Gallery ==
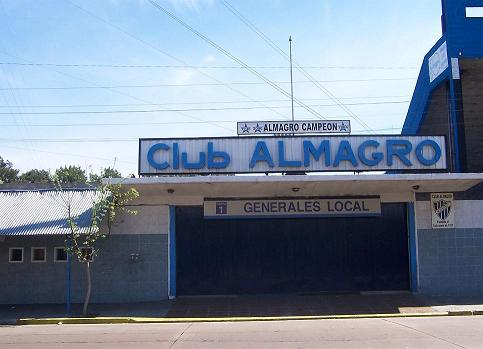
Club gate

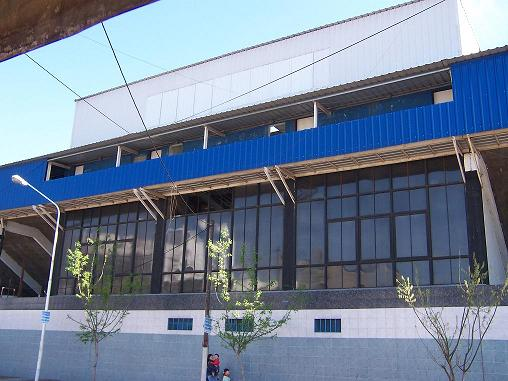
The facade of the stadium

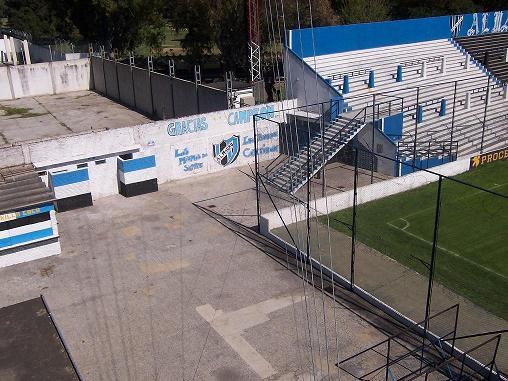
Entrance

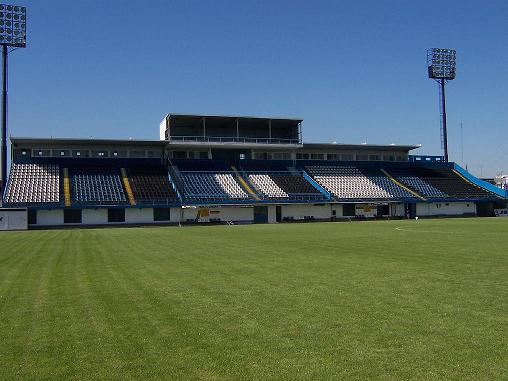
Seating places

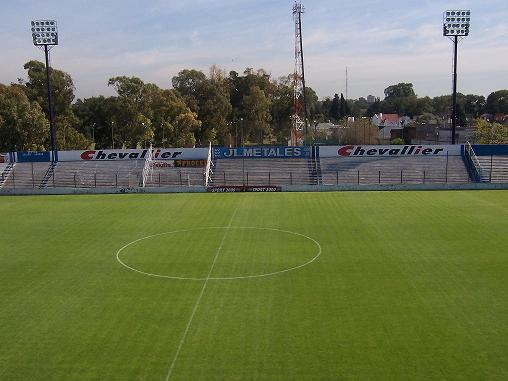
Standing places
