= José Ingenieros, Buenos Aires =

José Ingenieros
- District
- Location in Greater Buenos Aires
- Coordinates: 34°35′S 58°32′W
- Country: Argentina
- Province: Buenos Aires
- Partido: Tres de Febrero
- Elevation: 24 m (79 ft)

Population (2001 census [INDEC])
  - Total: 7,223
- CPA Base: B 1702
- Area code: +54 11

José Ingenieros is a town in Tres de Febrero Partido of Buenos Aires Province, Argentina. It is located in the Greater Buenos Aires urban agglomeration.

== Name ==
The settlement is named in honour of José Ingenieros (24 April 1877 – 31 October 1925), an Argentine physician, positivist philosopher and essayist.

== Sport ==
Estadio Tres de Febrero is located in the town, it is the home stadium of Club Almagro.
