= 2017–18 Primera B Nacional =

33rd season of the second-tier football league in Argentina

Primera B Nacional
- Season: 2017–18
- Dates: 15 September 2017– April 2018
- Champions: Aldosivi (1st title)
- Promoted: Aldosivi; San Martín (T)
- Relegated: Juventud Unida (G); Boca Unidos; All Boys; Estudiantes (SL); Flandria; Deportivo Riestra
- Matches: 300
- Goals: 603 (2.01 per match)
- All statistics correct as of 30 April 2018.

The 2017–18 Argentine Primera B Nacional was the 33rd season of the Argentine second division. The season began in September 2017 and ended in June 2018. Twenty-five teams competed in the league, seventeen returning from the 2016–17 season, four teams that were relegated from Primera División and two teams promoted from Federal A and B Metropolitana.

== Competition format ==
The league's format changed from the previous season. Twenty-five teams play each other once for a total of twenty-four matches each. The Champion earns promotion to the Primera División. The teams placed 2nd to 9th compete in the "Torneo Reducido" for the second promotion after the regular season ends. Six teams are relegated at the end of the season.

== Club information ==
Locations of the 2017–18 Primera B Nacional teams outside Greater Buenos Aires.
Locations of the 2017–18 Primera B Nacional teams within Greater Buenos Aires.

Club	City	Stadium
Agropecuario Argentino	Carlos Casares	Ofelia Rosenzuaig
Aldosivi	Mar del Plata	José María Minella
All Boys	Buenos Aires	Islas Malvinas
Almagro	José Ingenieros	Tres de Febrero
Atlético de Rafaela	Rafaela	Nuevo Monumental
Boca Unidos	Corrientes	Leoncio Benítez
Brown	Adrogué	Lorenzo Arandilla
Deportivo Morón	Morón	Nuevo Francisco Urbano
Deportivo Riestra	Buenos Aires	Guillermo Laza
Estudiantes (SL)	San Luis	Héctor Odicino-Pedro Benoza
Ferro Carril Oeste	Buenos Aires	Arquitecto Ricardo Etcheverry
Flandria	Jáuregui	Carlos V
Gimnasia y Esgrima (J)	Jujuy	23 de Agosto
Guillermo Brown	Puerto Madryn	Raúl Conti
Independiente Rivadavia	Mendoza	Bautista Gargantini
Instituto	Córdoba	Presidente Perón
Juventud Unida (G)	Gualeguaychú	Luis Delfino
Los Andes	Lomas de Zamora	Eduardo Gallardón
Mitre (SdE)	Santiago del Estero	Doctores José y Antonio Castiglione
Nueva Chicago	Buenos Aires	Nueva Chicago
Quilmes	Quilmes	Centenario
San Martín (T)	San Miguel de Tucumán	La Ciudadela
Santamarina	Tandil	Municipal Gral. San Martín
Sarmiento (J)	Junín	Eva Perón
Villa Dálmine	Campana	Villa Dálmine

== League table ==
Pos	Team	Pld	W	D	L	GF	GA	GD	Pts	Promotion or Qualification
1	Aldosivi (C, P)	24	11	8	5	30	22	+8	41	Championship play-off
2	Almagro	24	11	8	5	31	16	+15	41	Championship play-off
3	San Martín (T) (P)	24	9	12	3	29	21	+8	39	Qualification to Torneo Reducido
4	Brown	24	10	7	7	27	20	+7	37	Qualification to Torneo Reducido
5	Sarmiento (J)	24	10	7	7	31	27	+4	37	Qualification to Torneo Reducido
6	Instituto	24	10	7	7	22	19	+3	37	Qualification to Torneo Reducido
7	Atlético de Rafaela	24	9	9	6	34	22	+12	36	Qualification to Torneo Reducido
8	Villa Dálmine	24	10	6	8	24	17	+7	36	Qualification to Torneo Reducido
9	Agropecuario Argentino	24	10	5	9	30	28	+2	35	Qualification to Torneo Reducido
10	Gimnasia y Esgrima (J)	24	7	13	4	18	11	+7	34	
11	Deportivo Morón	24	7	12	5	22	23	−1	33	
12	Quilmes	24	8	8	8	24	23	+1	32	
13	Mitre (SdE)	24	8	8	8	21	22	−1	32	
14	Independiente Rivadavia	24	7	10	7	20	19	+1	31	
15	Juventud Unida (G)	24	8	6	10	20	29	−9	30	
16	Guillermo Brown	24	7	7	10	25	27	−2	28	
17	Los Andes	24	5	12	7	17	22	−5	27	
18	Ferro Carril Oeste	24	7	5	12	21	31	−10	26	
19	Deportivo Riestra (Note: Deportivo Riestra were deducted ten points at the end of the tournament, as a result of the incidents against Comunicaciones in the second match of the final of the 2016–17 Primera B Metropolitana Torneo Reducido. The deduction was appealed at the Court of Arbitration for Sports, which, after the end of the tournament, upheld the points deduction.)	24	9	8	7	29	24	+5	25	
20	Estudiantes (SL)	24	5	10	9	13	19	−6	25	
21	Boca Unidos	24	6	7	11	23	31	−8	25	
22	All Boys	24	6	7	11	24	33	−9	25	
23	Nueva Chicago	24	5	10	9	20	31	−11	25	
24	Flandria	24	5	9	10	28	36	−8	24	
25	Santamarina	24	5	9	10	20	30	−10	24	

Source: AFA
Rules for classification: 1) points; 2) play-off (only for deciding promotion or relegation); 3) goal difference; 4) goals scored; 5) head-to-head points; 6) head-to-head goal difference; 7) head-to-head goals scored.
(C) Champions; (P) Promoted

=== Championship play-off ===
Almagro and Aldosivi ended up tied in points at the end of the 24 weeks of regular season. Tournament rules establish that, unlike any other position on the table, if two or more teams are equal in points at the end of play, goal difference does not count and a playoff game is required. The winner of this match achieved promotion to Primera División as champions, while the loser advanced to the Torneo Reducido as runners-up.

4 May 2018
19:10

Aldosivi	3–1	Almagro
González 13' (pen.); Ellacopulos 60'; Chávez 79'	Report 1 Report 2	Acosta 59' (pen.)

Estadio Julio Grondona, Sarandí
Referee: Néstor Pitana

Team details

Aldosivi
Almagro

GK	1	(Argentina) Sebastián Moyano
DF	4	(Argentina) Emanuel Iñiguez		(substituted off) 86'
DF	2	(Argentina) Ezequiel Parnisari
DF	6	(Argentina) Maximiliano Velázquez
DF	3	(Argentina) Franco Canever	(yellow card) 27'
MF	8	(Argentina) Nahuel Yeri	(yellow card) 29'
MF	5	(Argentina) Leandro Somoza	(yellow card) 84'
MF	10	(Argentina) Arnaldo González
FW	7	(Argentina) Antonio Medina		(substituted off) 15'
FW	11	(Argentina) Cristian G. Chávez
FW	9	(Argentina) Emiliano Ellacopulos	(yellow card) 69'	(substituted off) 69'
Substitutions:
MF		(Argentina) Esteban Orfano		(substituted on) 15'
DF		(Argentina) Ismael Quilez		(substituted on) 69'
MF		(Argentina) Federico Domínguez		(substituted on) 86'
Manager:
(Argentina) Gustavo Álvarez

GK	1	(Argentina) Christian Limousin
DF	4	(Argentina) Brian Mieres
DF	6	(Argentina) Ariel Coronel
DF	2	(Argentina) Juan G. Rodríguez
DF	3	(Argentina) Adrián Torres
MF	8	(Argentina) Gabriel Compagnucci
MF	11	(Argentina) Saúl Nelle		(substituted off) 80'
MF	5	(Argentina) Ezequiel Piovi
MF	10	(Argentina) Ariel Chaves
FW	7	(Argentina) Alan Bonansea	(yellow card) 20'
FW	9	(Argentina) Diego Diellos		(substituted off) 55'
Substitutions:
FW		(Argentina) Leonardo S. Acosta		(substituted on) 55'
FW		(Paraguay) Adrián Fernández		(substituted on) 80'
Manager:
(Argentina) Sebastián Battaglia

== Results ==
Home \ Away	AGA	ALD	ALL	ALM	ATR	BOU	BRO	DMO	DRI	ESL	FCO	FLA	GEJ	GBR	IND	INS	JUG	LAN	MIT	NCH	QUI	SMT	SAN	SAR	VDA
Agropecuario Argentino		2–0		0–2	1–3					1–0	2–0			2–0			1–0	1–1	2–0	1–2	1–1				2–1
Aldosivi				1–3	2–2		1–0			2–0		2–2			0–0		2–0	1–1	1–0	3–0	1–3				1–0
All Boys	4–0	0–1				0–2		0–1	1–2		3–3		0–0	2–0		1–0						1–1	1–0	1–1	
Almagro			2–0			2–1	0–1	2–2	0–1			2–1	0–0		2–1		3–0					1–1	1–0	3–0	
Atletico de Rafaela			1–1	1–1			2–3	0–0		2–0		4–1			1–1		3–0	0–1		0–0	0–2				2–0
Boca Unidos	1–4	0–1			2–0				1–1		3–1		0–2	2–0		2–0			1–2			1–2	1–1	0–1	
Brown	3–1		3–0			3–0		0–1	1–1				0–2	1–2	0–0	1–0						1–0	3–0	2–1	
Deportivo Morón	2–1	3–3				1–1			1–3		0–0		1–1	1–0		0–1			1–1			1–1	1–0	1–0	
Deportivo Riestra	0–0	1–0			2–2						1–0			2–2		2–3		0–1	2–1		0–1	3–0	1–0		1–1
Estudiantes (SL)			2–0	1–0		2–0	0–0	0–0	3–2			0–1	0–0		0–0		1–0			0–0				1–1	
Ferro Carril Oeste		0–2		1–0	0–2		2–2			1–0		2–0					0–1	4–1	0–0	0–1	1–0				2–1
Flandria	0–1		2–0			0–1	0–0	2–2	1–1				0–0		2–2	0–2						3–3	1–1	3–5	
Gimnasia y Esgrima (J)	1–0	1–2			0–2				0–0		0–0			2–0		1–0			0–0		2–0	0–0	3–1		0–1
Guillermo Brown		1–1		0–0	1–3					2–0	3–0	3–0					3–0	0–0	3–1	2–0	1–2				1–1
Independiente Rivadavia	0–3		1–1			0–1		0–1	0–1		2–0		2–1	0–0		2–0						0–0	2–0	0–1	
Instituto	1–1	1–1		0–0	0–0					2–0	3–1			1–0				1–0	0–0	1–0	1–0				1–1
Juventud Unida (G)			3–1			2–0	1–1	1–0	3–2			1–0	0–0		1–0	2–4						0–2	2–0	2–2	
Los Andes			2–2	1–1		1–1	2–0	0–0		1–1		0–0	1–1		0–2		1–0			0–0				1–0	
Mitre (SdE)			1–2	1–0	1–0		1–0			1–0		2–1			3–1		0–0	2–1		0–1	1–1				0–1
Nueva Chicago			2–0	2–4		1–1	0–2	1–1	1–0			2–5	1–1		1–1		1–1						1–1	0–2	
Quilmes			2–3	0–2		1–1	3–0	2–1		0–0		0–2			0–1		0–0	1–0		1–1					1–0
San Martín (T)	4–2	0–0			0–2					1–1	1–0			3–0		0–0		1–0	1–1	2–1	1–1				1–1
Santamarina	0–0	1–2			1–0					0–0	2–1			1–1		1–0		1–1	1–1		3–2	1–2			1–0
Sarmiento (J)	2–1	1–0			2–2				1–0		1–2		0–0	2–0		3–0			2–1		0–0	0–2	3–3		
Villa Dálmine			1–0	0–0		2–0	0–0	3–0		2–1		0–1			0–1		2–0	2–0		2–1				2–0	

Updated to match(es) played on 30 April 2018. Source: AFA
Legend: Blue = home team win; Yellow = draw; Red = away team win.

== Torneo Reducido ==
Teams ending in positions 2 to 9 play the Torneo Reducido for a second Promotion to Primera División. Quarterfinals are played in one leg, at the stadium of the best placed team. In case of a tie, the best placed team advances. Semi-finals are played on two legs, and in case of a tie the best placed team advances. The finals are played on two legs, and a penalty shootout will occur in case of a tie.

Quarterfinals
1	Almagro	0
8	Agropecuario Argentino	2
4	Sarmiento (J) (bsr)	0
5	Instituto	0
(Pairings are reseeded after the first round)
2	San Martín (T) (bsr)	3
7	Villa Dálmine	3
3	Brown (bsr)	0
6	Atlético de Rafaela	0

Semi-finals
2	San Martín (T)	0	3	3
8	Agropecuario Argentino	0	0	0
3	Brown	1	2	3
4	Sarmiento (J)	1	4	5

Final
2	San Martín (T)	0	5	5
4	Sarmiento (J)	1	1	2

=== Finals ===
2018 Torneo Reducido Finals
27 May 2018
15:10
First leg

Sarmiento (J)	1–0	San Martín (T)
Miracco 16' (pen.)	Report 1 Report 2

Estadio Eva Perón, Junín
Referee: Germán Delfino

3 Jun 2018
16:40
Second leg

San Martín (T)	5–1	Sarmiento (J)
Acevedo 1', 64'; Bieler 47', 72'; Rodríguez 2'	Report 1 Report 2	Estévez 84'

La Ciudadela, S.M. de Tucumán
Attendance: 25,000
Referee: Facundo Tello

Team details

San Martín (T)
Sarmiento

GK	1	(Argentina) Ignacio Arce
DF	4	(Argentina) Rolando Serrano
DF	2	(Argentina) Lucas Acevedo
DF	6	(Paraguay) Ismael Benegas
DF	3	(Argentina) Ramón Martínez
MF	7	(Argentina) Gonzalo Rodríguez		(substituted off) a'
MF	8	(Argentina) Juan Galeano
MF	5	(Argentina) Alejandro Altuna	Yellow card	(substituted off) b'
MF	10	(Argentina) Matías García	Yellow card	(substituted off) c'
MF	11	(Argentina) Walter Busse
FW	9	(Argentina) Claudio Bieler (c)
Substitutes:
MF	15	(Argentina) Lucas Bossio		(substituted on) b'
MF	16	(Argentina) Damián Arce		(substituted on) c'
MF	17	(Argentina) Sergio González		(substituted on) a'
Manager:
(Argentina) Rubén Forestello

GK	1	(Argentina) Fernando Pellegrino
DF	4	(Argentina) Yamil Garnier (c)	Yellow card
DF	2	(Argentina) Ariel Kippes
DF	6	(Argentina) Lucas Landa
DF	3	(Argentina) Ramiro Arias		(substituted off) a'
MF	7	(Argentina) Ignacio Cacheiro
MF	8	(Argentina) Nahuel Estévez	Yellow card
MF	5	(Argentina) Guillermo Farré	Yellow card
MF	10	(Argentina) Gonzalo Bazán		(substituted off) b'
FW	11	(Argentina) Lucas Passerini
FW	9	(Argentina) Nicolás Miracco		(substituted off) c'
Substitutes:
DF	14	(Argentina) Maximiliano Méndez		(substituted on) c'
FW	16	(Argentina) Sergio Quiroga		(substituted on) b'
FW	17	(Argentina) Patricio Vidal		(substituted on) a'
Manager:
(Argentina) Iván Delfino

== Relegation ==
The bottom six teams of this table were relegated. In the Primera B Nacional, clubs with an indirect affiliation with Argentine Football Association are relegated to the Torneo Federal A, while clubs directly affiliated are relegated to Primera B Metropolitana.

Pos	Team	2015 Pts	2016 Pts	2016–17 Pts	2017–18 Pts	Total Pts	Total Pld	Avg	Relegation
1	Aldosivi	—	—	—	41	41	24	1.708	
2	Sarmiento (J)	—	—	—	37	37	24	1.542	
3	Atlético de Rafaela	—	—	—	36	36	24	1.5	
4	San Martín (T)	—	—	61	39	100	68	1.471	
5	Brown	—	28	65	37	130	89	1.461	
6	Agropecuario Argentino	—	—	—	35	35	24	1.458	
7	Almagro	—	28	60	41	129	89	1.449	
8	Guillermo Brown	48	30	75	28	181	131	1.382	
9	Deportivo Morón	—	—	—	33	33	24	1.375	
10	Gimnasia y Esgrima (J)	55	38	52	34	179	131	1.366	
11	Ferro Carril Oeste	67	26	60	26	179	131	1.366	
12	Instituto	62	16	63	37	178	131	1.359	
13	Santamarina	66	27	61	24	178	131	1.359	
14	Villa Dálmine	60	33	47	36	176	131	1.344	
15	Quilmes	—	—	—	32	32	24	1.333	
16	Mitre (SdE)	—	—	—	32	32	24	1.333	
17	Los Andes	54	30	59	27	170	131	1.298	
18	Nueva Chicago	—	30	60	25	115	89	1.292	
19	Independiente Rivadavia	51	20	67	31	169	131	1.29	
20	Juventud Unida (G) (R)	54	28	55	30	167	131	1.275	Primera B Metropolitana or Torneo Federal A
21	Boca Unidos (R)	54	38	47	25	164	131	1.252	Primera B Metropolitana or Torneo Federal A
22	All Boys (R)	53	26	60	25	164	131	1.252	Primera B Metropolitana or Torneo Federal A
23	Estudiantes (SL) (R)	56	24	54	25	159	131	1.214	Primera B Metropolitana or Torneo Federal A
24	Flandria (R)	—	—	56	24	80	68	1.176	Primera B Metropolitana or Torneo Federal A
25	Deportivo Riestra (R) (Note: Deportivo Riestra were deducted ten points at the end of the tournament, as a result of the incidents against Comunicaciones in the second match of the final of the 2016–17 Primera B Metropolitana Torneo Reducido. The deduction was appealed at the Court of Arbitration for Sports, which, after the end of the tournament, upheld the points deduction.)	—	—	—	25	25	24	1.042	Primera B Metropolitana or Torneo Federal A

Source: AFA

As of 30 April 2018

== Season statistics ==
=== Top scorers ===
As of May 1, 2018

Rank	Player	Club	Goals
1	(Argentina) Jonathan Herrera	Deportivo Riestra and Ferro Carril Oeste	13
2	(Argentina) Fernando Telechea	Aldosivi	11
3	(Argentina) Claudio Bieler	San Martín (T)	10

== See also ==
- 2017–18 Argentine Primera División
- 2017–18 Torneo Federal A
- 2017–18 Copa Argentina
