= Club Almagro =

Association football club in Argentina

Almagro
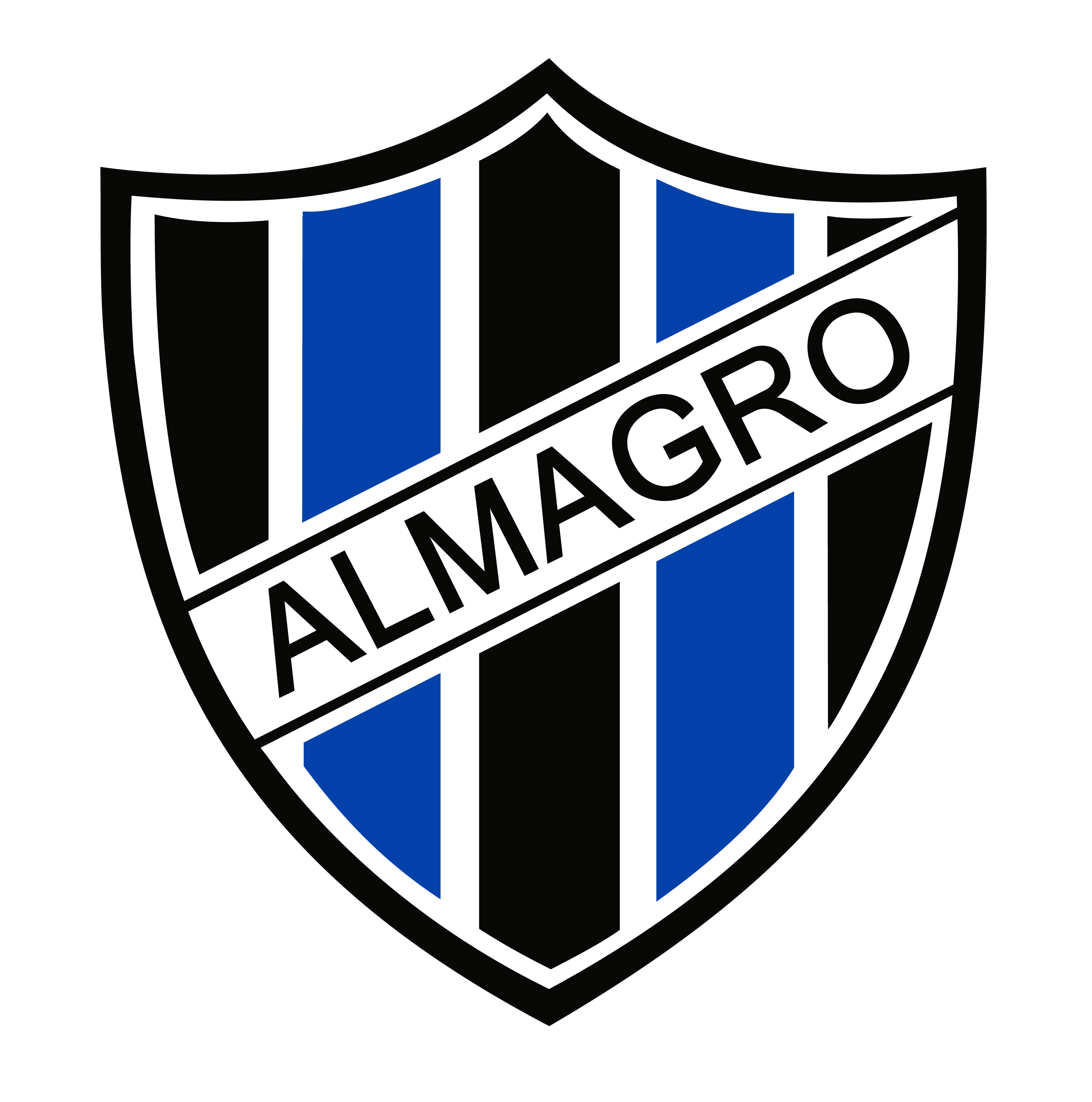
- Full name: Club Almagro
- Nickname: Tricolor
- Founded: 6 January 1911; 115 years ago
- Ground: Estadio Tres de Febrero, José Ingenieros, Buenos Aires
- Capacity: 19,000
- Chairman: Mauro Bolischki (since 27 october 2024)
- Manager: Carlos Mayor
- League: Primera Nacional
- 2025: Primera Nacional Zone A, 16th of 18
- Website: almagro.club
Home colours	Away colours	Third colours

Club Almagro is an Argentine sports club from José Ingenieros, Buenos Aires, although its headquarters are in the Almagro district. The football team currently plays in the Primera Nacional, the second division of the Argentine football league system.

== History ==
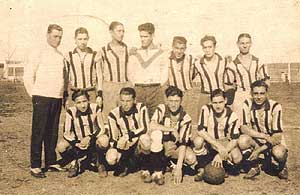
The team that won the Primera B title in 1937.

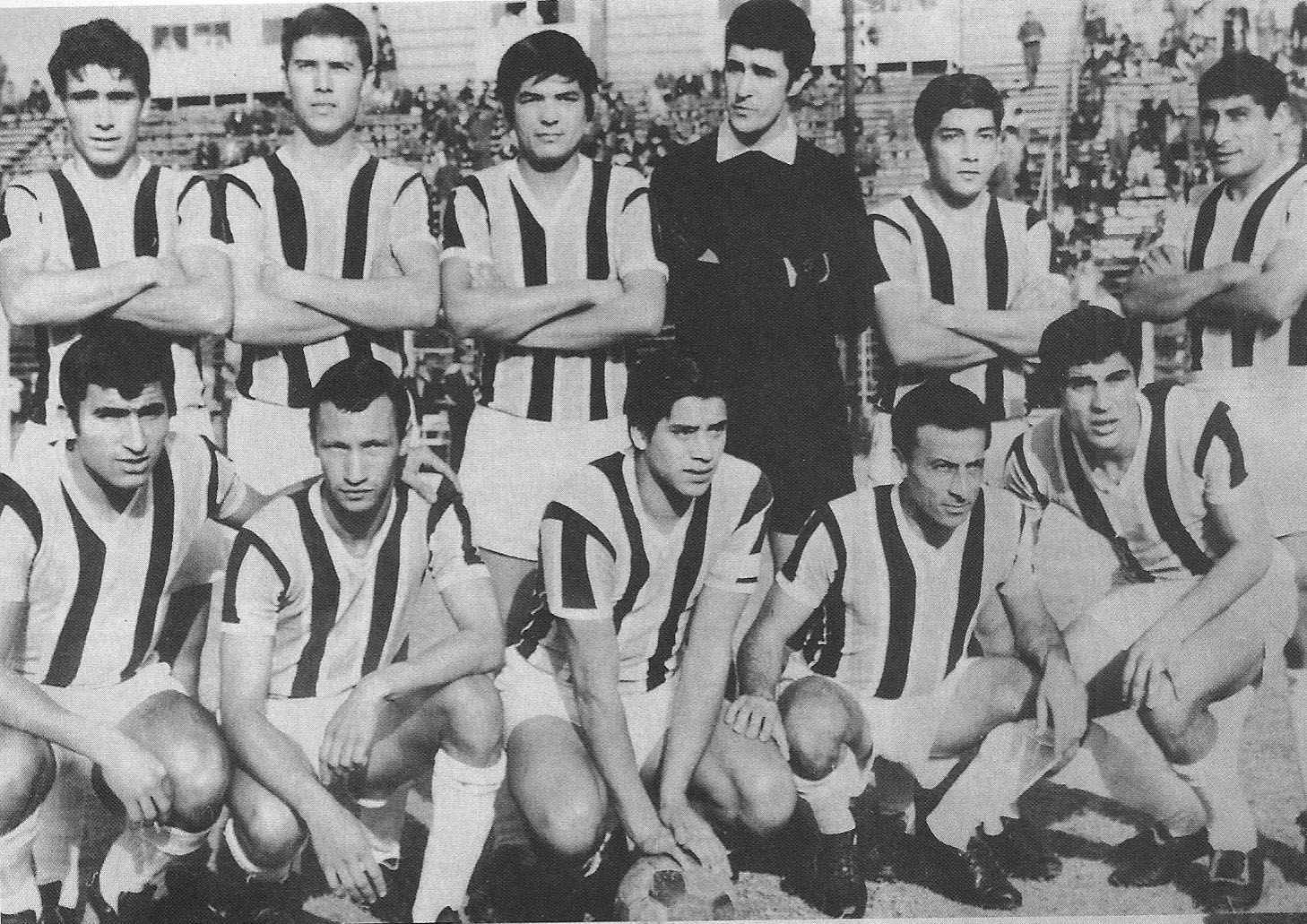
In 1968 Almagro won another title and promoted to Primera.

Almagro was founded on 6 January 1911, in the Almagro neighbourhood of Buenos Aires. The club still has its sports facilities there for its members, but the football stadium (with a capacity of 19,000) is located in José Ingenieros, in the Tres de Febrero Partido of Greater Buenos Aires.

In 1919 there was a new splitting in Argentine football, so both leagues were played at the same time: official Asociación Argentina de Football (with one of Almagro predecessors, Columbian, as one of its teams) and dissident "Asociación Amateurs de Football". During that season, Columbian was going through a severe economic crisis, disputing its last game v. Boca Juniors in the 6th fixture. Some executives of recently promoted Club Almagro, led by Miguel de Zárate made Columbial a merger proposal, which was accepted.

Therefore, Almagro renamed "Sportivo Almagro" and continued playing in Primera División (debuting in the 7th fixture vs Platense) under its new denomination, which avoided the club to be disaffiliated.

Almagro played one year in first division in 1938 after winning the first second division tournament that awarded a promotion. Later the team won the 1968 second division tournament, but had to participate in the "reclasificatorio" tournament with first division teams and other second division teams and didn't win promotion.

The Tricolores played most of the time in second division, a few years in third division, but in 2000 and 2004 they won the promotion to Primera División, only to be relegated both times after only one season playing at the top level.

In 2000 Almagro returned to Primera División after beating Instituto de Córdoba by 1–0 (2–1 on aggregate) at relegation playoffs (named "Promoción" in Argentina).

== Players ==
As of 8 May 2025

Note: Flags indicate national team as defined under FIFA eligibility rules; some limited exceptions apply. Players may hold more than one non-FIFA nationality.

No.	Pos.	Nation	Player
—	GK	ARG	Leonel Barrionuevo
—	GK	ARG	Emilio Emiliano González
—	GK	ARG	Christian Limousin
—	DF	ARG	Lautaro Busto
—	DF	ARG	Leandro Figueredo
—	DF	ARG	Mariano Gancedo
—	DF	ARG	Martín García
—	DF	ARG	Gianfranco Joannaz
—	DF	ARG	Nahuel Kramer
—	DF	ARG	Marcos Pinto
—	DF	ARG	Laureano Puñet
—	DF	ARG	Aldo Rimbelitti

No.	Pos.	Nation	Player
—	DF	ARG	Ramiro Ríos
—	DF	ARG	Ulises Yegros
—	MF	ARG	Tomás Castro Ponce
—	MF	ARG	Ariel Cháves
—	MF	ARG	Lauro Gamba
—	MF	ARG	Ángel González
—	MF	ARG	Luis Jerez Silva
—	MF	ARG	Carlo Lattanzio
—	FW	ARG	Nicolás Servetto
—	FW	ARG	Martín Giménez
—	FW	ARG	Agustín Bianchi

== Coaching staff ==
- Manager: (Argentina) Carlos Mayor
- Assistant coaches: (Argentina) Claudio Valz
- Goalkeeper coach: (Argentina) Nicolás Villalba
- Fitness coaches: (Argentina) Mariano Mattia

=== Out on loan ===
Note: Flags indicate national team as defined under FIFA eligibility rules; some limited exceptions apply. Players may hold more than one non-FIFA nationality.

No.	Pos.	Nation	Player
—	DF	ARG	Marco Lambert (at Talleres RE until 31 December 2022)

== Notable players ==
- (Argentina) Luciano Cigno
- (Argentina) Leonardo Costas
- (Argentina) Jonás Gutiérrez
- (Argentina) Lucas Sparapani
- (Malaysia) Rodrigo Holgado

== Honours ==
=== National ===
==== League ====
- Primera División B (1): 1968
- Segunda División (1): 1937
- Primera C Metropolitana (1): 1971
