= 2017–18 Chacarita Juniors season =

Chacarita Juniors
2017–18 season
- Chairman: Héctor López
- Manager: Walter Coyette (until 3 December 2017); Luis Marabotto (int.) (from 4 December 2017 to 16 December 2017); Sebastián Pena (from 16 December 2017)
- Stadium: Estadio de Chacarita Juniors
- Primera División: 25th
- Copa Argentina: Round of 64
- Top goalscorer: League: Federico Rosso (3); All: Federico Rosso (3)

The 2017–18 season is Chacarita Juniors' 1st season back in the top-flight of Argentine football, following promotion from Primera B Nacional in 2016–17. The season covers the period from 1 August 2017 to 30 June 2018.

== Current squad ==
As of 26 August 2017.

Note: Flags indicate national team as defined under FIFA eligibility rules; some limited exceptions apply. Players may hold more than one non-FIFA nationality.

No.	Pos.	Nation	Player
—	GK	ARG	Cristian Campestrini
—	GK	ARG	Facundo Ferrero
—	GK	ARG	Lucas Álvarez
—	GK	ARG	Pedro Fernández
—	DF	ARG	Alan Robledo
—	DF	ARG	Federico Rosso
—	DF	ARG	Germán Ré
—	DF	ARG	Gian Croci
—	DF	ARG	Joaquín Ibáñez
—	DF	ARG	Juan González
—	DF	ARG	Lautaro Montoya (on loan from San Lorenzo)
—	DF	ARG	Nahuel Tribulo
—	MF	ARG	Agustín Módula
—	MF	ARG	Alejandro Gagliardi (on loan from Patronato)
—	MF	ARG	Cristian Erbes
—	MF	ARG	Diego Rivero
—	MF	ARG	Gabriel Lazarte

No.	Pos.	Nation	Player
—	MF	ARG	Javier Mendoza
—	MF	ARG	Juan Álvarez
—	MF	ARG	Julio Zuñiga
—	MF	ARG	Matías Medina
—	MF	ARG	Matías Rodríguez
—	MF	ARG	Matías Sánchez
—	MF	ARG	Miguel Mellado
—	MF	ARG	Nahuel Menéndez
—	MF	ARG	Nicolás Chávez
—	FW	ARG	Elías Alderete
—	FW	ARG	Juan Imbert
—	FW	ARG	Leandro Barrera
—	FW	ARG	Leandro Martínez (on loan from San Martín)
—	FW	ARG	Maximiliano Casa
—	FW	ARG	Matías González
—	FW	ARG	Pablo Vegetti

=== Out on loan ===
Note: Flags indicate national team as defined under FIFA eligibility rules; some limited exceptions apply. Players may hold more than one non-FIFA nationality.

No.	Pos.	Nation	Player
—	FW	ARG	Facundo Melivilo (at Defensa y Justicia until 30 June 2018)
—	MF	ARG	Matías Nizzo (at Instituto until 30 June 2018)

== Transfers ==
=== In ===
Date	Pos.	Name	From	Fee
9 August 2017	GK	(Argentina) Cristian Campestrini	(Mexico) Puebla	Undisclosed
10 August 2017	MF	(Argentina) Cristian Erbes	(Mexico) Veracruz	Undisclosed
10 August 2017	MF	(Argentina) Javier Mendoza	(Argentina) Gimnasia y Esgrima	Undisclosed
11 August 2017	FW	(Argentina) Juan Imbert	(Argentina) Arsenal de Sarandí	Undisclosed
22 August 2017	FW	(Argentina) Pablo Vegetti	(Argentina) Gimnasia y Esgrima	Undisclosed

=== Out ===
Date	Pos.	Name	To	Fee
6 July 2017	MF	(Argentina) Rodrigo Aliendro	(Argentina) Atlético Tucumán	Undisclosed
1 August 2017	DF	(Argentina) Zelmar García	(Argentina) Colegiales	Undisclosed
2 August 2017	FW	(Argentina) Jonathan Rodríguez	(Greece) PAS Giannina	Undisclosed
6 August 2017	DF	(Argentina) Gonzalo Pedrosa	(Argentina) Fénix	Undisclosed
7 August 2017	GK	(Argentina) Emanuel Trípodi	(Argentina) Quilmes	Undisclosed
9 August 2017	DF	(Argentina) Maximiliano Paredes	(Argentina) Deportivo Morón	Undisclosed
10 August 2017	FW	(Argentina) Maximiliano Casa	(Argentina) Atlético de Rafaela	Undisclosed
14 August 2017	FW	(Argentina) Rodrigo Salinas	(Saudi Arabia) Al-Ettifaq	Undisclosed

=== Loan in ===
Date from	Date to	Pos.	Name	From
17 August 2017	30 June 2018	DF	(Argentina) Lautaro Montoya	(Argentina) San Lorenzo
22 August 2017	30 June 2018	FW	(Argentina) Leandro Martínez	(Argentina) San Martín
23 August 2017	30 June 2018	MF	(Argentina) Alejandro Gagliardi	(Argentina) Patronato

=== Loan out ===
Date from	Date to	Pos.	Name	To
31 July 2017	30 June 2018	FW	(Argentina) Facundo Melivilo	(Argentina) Defensa y Justicia
31 July 2017	30 June 2018	MF	(Argentina) Matías Nizzo	(Argentina) Instituto

== Primera División ==
=== League table ===
Pos	Team	Pld	W	D	L	GF	GA	GD	Pts
24	Tigre	27	4	12	11	26	33	−7	24
25	Temperley	27	5	8	14	22	46	−24	23
26	Chacarita Juniors	27	4	6	17	23	40	−17	18
27	Arsenal	27	3	8	16	19	36	−17	17
28	Olimpo	27	3	6	18	16	50	−34	15

Source: AFA
Rules for classification: 1) points; 2) play-off (only if needed to decide championship); 3) goal difference; 4) goals scored; 5) head-to-head points; 6) head-to-head goal difference; 7) head-to-head goals scored.

=== Results by matchday ===
Matchday	1	2	3	4	5	6	7	8	9	10	11	12	13	14	15	16	17	18	19	20	21	22	23	24	25	26	27
Ground	A	H	A	H	A	H	A	H	A	H	A	H	A														
Result	L	D	D	L	L	L	L	W	D	L	L	W															
Position	27 (Note: After the postponement on Matchday 1, they were 19th.)	20	22	24	27	27	27	23	25	26	27	25															

Updated to match(es) played on 12 December 2017. Source: Soccerway
A = Away; H = Home; W = Win; D = Draw; L = Loss

8 October 2017 (Note: Match was originally scheduled for 28 August 2017 before being postponed.) 1	Argentinos Juniors (Argentina)	1–0	(Argentina) Chacarita Juniors	Buenos Aires, Argentina
16:00	N. González 27'	Report		Stadium: Estadio Diego Armando Maradona; Referee: Nicolás Lamolina (Argentina)

10 September 2017 2	Chacarita Juniors (Argentina)	1–1	(Argentina) Tigre	Villa Maipú, Argentina
11:05	L. Martínez 88'	Report	C. Rodríguez 66'	Stadium: Estadio de Chacarita Juniors; Referee: Fernando Rapallini (Argentina)

17 September 2017 3	Atlético Tucumán (Argentina)	1–1	(Argentina) Chacarita Juniors	San Miguel de Tucumán, Argentina
14:05	L. Rodríguez 60'	Report	J. Mendoza 23'	Stadium: Estadio Monumental José Fierro; Referee: Facundo Tello (Argentina)

23 September 2017 4	Chacarita Juniors (Argentina)	0–1	(Argentina) Talleres	Villa Maipú, Argentina
16:15		Report	L. Olaza 56'	Stadium: Estadio de Chacarita Juniors; Referee: Germán Delfino (Argentina)

1 October 2017 5	Boca Juniors (Argentina)	1–0	(Argentina) Chacarita Juniors	Buenos Aires, Argentina
18:05	C. Pavón 3'	Report		Stadium: La Bombonera; Referee: Néstor Pitana (Argentina)

15 October 2017 6	Chacarita Juniors (Argentina)	1–2	(Argentina) Independiente	Villa Maipú, Argentina
11:05	J. Imbert 1'	Report	F. Bustos 10'; E. Barco 55'	Stadium: Estadio de Chacarita Juniors; Referee: Fernando Echenique (Argentina)

29 October 2017 7	Newell's Old Boys (Argentina)	2–1	(Argentina) Chacarita Juniors	Rosario, Argentina
11:05	B. Sarmiento 30'; B. Bianchi 40'	Report	J. Álvarez 83'	Stadium: Estadio Marcelo Bielsa; Referee: Diego Abal (Argentina)

3 November 2017 8	Chacarita Juniors (Argentina)	2–0	(Argentina) Gimnasia y Esgrima	Villa Maipú, Argentina
19:05	F. Rosso 42'; M. Matos 47'	Report		Stadium: Estadio de Chacarita Juniors; Referee: Jorge Baliño (Argentina)

19 November 2017 9	Unión Santa Fe (Argentina)	0–0	(Argentina) Chacarita Juniors	Santa Fe, Argentina
17:00		Report		Stadium: Estadio 15 de Abril; Referee: Mauro Vigliano (Argentina)

24 November 2017 10	Chacarita Juniors (Argentina)	0–2	(Argentina) Huracán	Villa Maipú, Argentina
19:15		Report	N. Briasco 14'; M. Bogado 60' (pen.)	Stadium: Estadio de Chacarita Juniors; Referee: Fernando Rapallini (Argentina)

2 December 2017 11	Olimpo (Argentina)	2–0	(Argentina) Chacarita Juniors	Bahía Blanca, Argentina
17:00	D. Depetris 38'; M. Fornari 47'	Report		Stadium: Estadio Roberto Natalio Carminatti; Referee: Néstor Pitana (Argentina)

11 December 2017 12	Chacarita Juniors (Argentina)	3–0	(Argentina) Lanús	Villa Maipú, Argentina
21:30	M. Rodríguez 14'; F. Rosso 19', 53'	Report		Stadium: Estadio de Chacarita Juniors; Referee: Nicolás Lamolina (Argentina)

January 2018 13	Godoy Cruz (Argentina)	–	(Argentina) Chacarita Juniors	Mendoza, Argentina
		Report		Stadium: Estadio Malvinas Argentinas

== Copa Argentina ==
Win Draw Loss

–
