= 2017–18 Club Atlético Boca Juniors season =

Boca Juniors
2017–18 season
- President: (Argentina) Daniel Angelici
- Manager: (Argentina) Guillermo Barros Schelotto
- Stadium: Estadio Alberto J. Armando (La Bombonera)
- Primera División: Winners
- Copa Argentina: Round of 16
- Supercopa Argentina: Runners-up
- Copa Libertadores: Group Stage
- Top goalscorer: League: Darío Benedetto (12); All: Darío Benedetto (12)
Home colours	Away colours	Third colours

The 2017–18 Club Atlético Boca Juniors season is the 89th consecutive Primera División season for the senior squad. During the season, Boca Juniors will take part in the Primera División, Copa Argentina, Supercopa Argentina and in the Group Stage of the Copa Libertadores.

== Season overview ==
=== June ===
Ramiro Martínez is transferred to Godoy Cruz.

=== July ===
Fernando Evangelista, Leandro Marín, Nicolás Colazo, Gonzalo Castellani, Franco Cristaldo, Adrián Cubas, Alexis Messidoro, Tomás Pochettino, Nicolás Benegas, Agustín Bouzat and Andrés Chávez returned from their loans. Axel Werner, Fernando Tobio, Jonathan Silva and Ricardo Centurión returned to their clubs after a loan spell in Boca. In the first days of July Paolo Goltz arrived to the club, Gonzalo Castellani, Adrián Cubas, Franco Cristaldo and Tomás Pochettino are loaned to Defensa y Justicia and Leandro Marín is transferred to FC Lausanne-Sport. Edwin Cardona arrives on a one-year loan from Monterrey and Cristian Espinoza arrives on an 18-month loan from Villarreal. Nicolás Colazo is loaned to Gimnasia y Esgrima (LP). The first friendly is a 1–1 draw against Nacional, Boca won 3–1 in penalties.

=== August ===
The second friendly is a 1–0 victory over Villarreal. In mutual agreement, Boca purchases the rights of Ramón Ábila from Cruzeiro and is loaned to Huracán, also, in the operation, Alexis Messidoro is loaned to Cruzeiro. In Salta, Boca won 4–2 in penalties after a 1–1 draw against Banfield. On August 12, Nicolás Benegas is loaned to San Martín (T). The first official match of the season is a 5–0 win against Gimnasia y Tiro in the Round of 64 of Copa Argentina, with a brace of Benedetto, and a great debut of Cardona. Andrés Chávez is transferred to Panathinaikos. On August 24, Boca and Peñarol reached an agreement for the transfer of midfielder Nahitan Nández. Marcelo Torres is loaned to Talleres (C). Fernando Zuqui is transferred to Estudiantes (LP). In the first game of the tournament Boca defeated Olimpo 3–0.

=== September ===
On September 2, Boca won 1-0 a friendly Superclásico over River Plate in San Juan. Nazareno Solis is loaned to Huracán. The second game of the tournament was a 1–0 victory over Lanús. Boca advanced in the Copa Argentina after defeating 1-0 Guillermo Brown in the Round of 32. On September 18 Boca won 4–1 over Godoy Cruz Antonio Tomba, followed by a 4–0 victory over Vélez Sarsfield. After 12 games without losing, Boca was defeated by Rosario Central and was eliminated of the 2016–17 Copa Argentina.

=== October ===
Boca won a tough match against Chacarita Juniors on the first match of October. Boca won the match against Patronato and against Belgrano, and set a team record with seven wins from the first seven matches in the league.

=== November ===
In the Superclásico, Boca won 2–1 over River Plate, winning eight games in a row. Boca finally lost 2–1 against Racing Club, Darío Benedetto suffered a knee injured and is out for six months. The second defeat came after a 1–0 loss against Rosario Central.

=== December ===
Boca returned to the victory after a 2-0 winning over Arsenal. In the last match of the year Boca won 1–0 over Estudiantes (LP) staying on the top in the entire 2017. On December 20 Boca were drawn into Group H of the 2018 Copa Libertadores with Brazilian team Palmeiras, Peruvian champions Alianza Lima and a team from the Qualifying Stages. Ramón Ábila returned from his loan on Huracán. On December 27, right back Julio Buffarini arrives to the club. Agustín Bouzat is transferred to Vélez Sarsfield.

=== January ===
Left back Emmanuel Mas signed a three-year contract with the club. After a controversial departure and hard talks, Carlos Tevez has returned to Boca. Nahuel Molina Lucero is loaned to Defensa y Justicia. Boca and Fernando Evangelista agreed to mutually terminate the defender's contract, Evangelista subsequently joined Newell's Old Boys. Playmaker Emanuel Reynoso arrived to the club from Talleres (C) for $1.500.000 and the loan of Alexis Messidoro and percentages of other players. On the kickoff return of the Argentine League, Boca won 2–0 over Colón. Boca and Gonzalo Castellani agreed to mutually terminate the midfielder's contract, Castellani subsequently joined Atlético Nacional. Boca and Juan Manuel Insaurralde agreed to mutually terminate the defender's contract, Insaurralde subsequently joined Colo-Colo.

=== February ===
Gino Peruzzi is loaned to Nacional. On February 4, Boca was held by San Lorenzo to a 1–1 draw. On February 11, Boca got a hard 1–0 win against Temperley, and other 1–0 against Banfield to keep leading the tournament. On February 25, Boca won 4–2 over San Martín (SJ).

=== March ===
Boca drew 0–0 against Alianza Lima in the first game of 2018 Copa Libertadores. On March 5, Boca played the worst match of the tournament and lost 2–0 against Argentinos Juniors. On March 10, on a very emotional game, Boca won 2–1 at home against Tigre. In the 2017 Supercopa Argentina Boca lost the Superclásico 2–0 against eternal rival River Plate. Continuing the tournament, Boca drew 1–1 against Atlético Tucumán.

=== April ===
The first match of April was an agonic 2–1 win against Talleres (C). The second match of the group stage of Copa Libertadores was a 1–0 victory over Colombian Junior. On April 8, Boca played awfully against Defensa y Justicia 2–1, nevertheless, Boca keeps leading the tournament. On April 11, Boca were held by Palmeiras to a 1–1 draw away from home, in the third match of Copa Libertadores group stage. Another bad match took Boca to the second consecutive loss, after the 1–0 defeat against Independiente. On April 22, Boca returned to the good game and managed to win 3–1 over Newell's Old Boys. On the fourth game of Copa Libertadores group stage, Boca lost 2–0 against Palmeiras.

=== May ===
The first match of May was a 1–1 draw against Junior in Colombia. In the last game in La Bombonera, Boca won 2–0 over Unión. Boca was crowned League champions after a 2–2 draw against Gimnasia y Esgrima (LP), defending their own title achieved last season, claiming their thirty-third domestic title. The last match of the League was a 3–3 draw against Huracán. The last match of the season was a 5–0 win over Alianza Lima, with this victory, Boca qualified for the Round of 16.

== Squad ==
Last updated on May 17, 2018

Squad No.	Name	Nationality	Position	Date of Birth (Age)	Apps	Goals	Signed from	Note
Goalkeepers
1	Guillermo Sara	(Argentina)	GK	September 30, 1987 (age 39)	37	-36	(Spain) Real Betis	
12	Agustín Rossi	(Argentina)	GK	August 21, 1995 (age 31)	50	-37	(Argentina) Defensa y Justicia	
Defenders
2	Paolo Goltz	(Argentina)	DF	May 12, 1985 (age 41)	25	0	(Mexico) América	Injured
3	Emmanuel Mas	(Argentina)	DF	January 15, 1989 (age 37)	8	1	(Turkey) Trabzonspor	
6	Lisandro Magallán	(Argentina)	DF	September 27, 1993 (age 33)	63	1	(Argentina) Defensa y Justicia	
18	Frank Fabra	(Colombia)	DF	February 22, 1991 (age 35)	63	7	(Colombia) Independiente Medellín	
21	Agustín Heredia	(Argentina)	DF	June 16, 1997 (age 29)	3	0	(Argentina) Academy	
24	Julio Buffarini	(Argentina)	DF	August 18, 1988 (age 38)	16	0	(Brazil) São Paulo	
27	Santiago Vergini (VC 4º)	(Argentina)	DF	August 3, 1988 (age 38)	44	0	(England) Sunderland	
36	Gonzalo Goñi	(Argentina)	DF	August 16, 1998 (age 28)	1	0	(Argentina) Academy	
Midfielders
5	Fernando Gago (C)	(Argentina)	MF	April 10, 1986 (age 40)	186	8	(Spain) Valencia	
8	Pablo Pérez (VC 2º)	(Argentina)	MF	August 10, 1985 (age 41)	107	12	(Spain) Málaga	
10	Edwin Cardona	(Colombia)	MF	December 8, 1992 (age 33)	29	6	(Mexico) Monterrey	
14	Sebastián Pérez Cardona	(Colombia)	MF	March 29, 1993 (age 33)	19	0	(Colombia) Atlético Nacional	
15	Nahitan Nández	(Uruguay)	MF	December 28, 1995 (age 30)	30	4	(Uruguay) Peñarol	
16	Wílmar Barrios	(Colombia)	MF	October 16, 1993 (age 32)	51	1	(Colombia) Deportes Tolima	
20	Gonzalo Maroni	(Argentina)	MF	March 18, 1999 (age 27)	9	1	(Argentina) Academy	
29	Leonardo Jara	(Argentina)	MF	May 20, 1991 (age 35)	67	2	(Argentina) Estudiantes (LP)	
30	Emanuel Reynoso	(Argentina)	MF	November 16, 1995 (age 30)	16	0	(Argentina) Talleres (C)	
33	Gonzalo Lamardo	(Argentina)	MF	April 25, 1997 (age 29)	1	0	(Argentina) Academy	
39	Agustín Almendra	(Argentina)	MF	February 11, 2000 (age 26)	3	0	(Argentina) Academy	
40	Julián Chicco	(Argentina)	MF	January 13, 1998 (age 28)	5	0	(Argentina) Academy	
Forwards
7	Cristian Pavón	(Argentina)	FW	January 21, 1996 (age 30)	90	25	(Argentina) Colón	
9	Darío Benedetto	(Argentina)	FW	May 17, 1990 (age 36)	42	35	(Mexico) América	Injured
11	Cristian Espinoza	(Argentina)	FW	April 3, 1995 (age 31)	14	0	(Spain) Villarreal	
17	Ramón Ábila	(Argentina)	FW	October 14, 1989 (age 36)	16	8	(Argentina) Huracán	
19	Walter Bou	(Argentina)	FW	August 25, 1993 (age 33)	48	9	(Argentina) Gimnasia y Esgrima (LP)	
22	Oscar Benítez	(Argentina)	FW	January 14, 1993 (age 33)	24	3	(Portugal) Benfica	
32	Carlos Tevez (VC 3º)	(Argentina)	FW	February 5, 1984 (age 42)	182	68	(China) Shanghai Shenhua	
34	Guido Vadalá	(Argentina)	FW	February 8, 1997 (age 29)	6	1	(Argentina) Unión	

== Transfers ==
=== In ===
==== Winter ====
Players transferred
Date	Pos.	Name	Club	Fee
6 July 2017	DF	(Argentina) Paolo Goltz	(Mexico) América	$2.000.000
9 August 2017	FW	(Argentina) Ramón Ábila	(Brazil) Cruzeiro	Undisclosed
24 August 2017	MF	(Uruguay) Nahitan Nández	(Uruguay) Peñarol	Undisclosed

Players loaned
Start date	Pos.	Name	Club	End date
19 July 2017	MF	(Colombia) Edwin Cardona	(Mexico) Monterrey	June 2018
28 July 2017	FW	(Argentina) Cristian Espinoza	(Spain) Villarreal	December 2018

Loan Return
Date	Pos.	Name	Return from
30 June 2017	DF	(Argentina) Fernando Evangelista	(Argentina) Atlético Tucumán
30 June 2017	DF	(Argentina) Leandro Marín	(Argentina) Arsenal
30 June 2017	MF	(Argentina) Gonzalo Castellani	(Argentina) Defensa y Justicia
30 June 2017	MF	(Argentina) Nicolás Colazo	(Australia) Melbourne City FC
30 June 2017	MF	(Argentina) Franco Cristaldo	(Spain) Rayo Vallecano
30 June 2017	MF	(Argentina) Adrián Cubas	(Italy) Pescara
30 June 2017	MF	(Argentina) Alexis Messidoro	(Bolivia) Sport Boys
30 June 2017	MF	(Argentina) Tomás Pochettino	(Argentina) Defensa y Justicia
30 June 2017	FW	(Argentina) Nicolás Benegas	(Argentina) Quilmes
30 June 2017	FW	(Argentina) Agustín Bouzat	(Argentina) Defensa y Justicia
30 June 2017	FW	(Argentina) Andrés Chávez	(Brazil) São Paulo

==== Summer ====
Players transferred
Date	Pos.	Name	Club	Fee
27 December 2017	DF	(Argentina) Julio Buffarini	(Brazil) São Paulo	$1.500.000
5 January 2018	DF	(Argentina) Emmanuel Mas	(Turkey) Trabzonspor	$2.800.000
5 January 2018	FW	(Argentina) Carlos Tevez	(China) Shanghai Shenhua	Free
28 January 2018	MF	(Argentina) Emanuel Reynoso	(Argentina) Talleres (C)	$1.500.000

Players loaned
Start date	Pos.	Name	Club	End date

Loan Return
Date	Pos.	Name	Return from
1 January 2018	FW	(Argentina) Ramón Ábila	(Argentina) Huracán

=== Out ===
==== Winter ====
Players transferred
Date	Pos.	Name	Club	Fee
21 April 2017	MF	(Uruguay) Rodrigo Bentancur	(Italy) Juventus	$9.500.000
29 June 2017	GK	(Argentina) Ramiro Martínez	(Argentina) Godoy Cruz	Undisclosed
7 July 2017	DF	(Argentina) Leandro Marín	(Switzerland) FC Lausanne-Sport	Undisclosed
17 August 2017	FW	(Argentina) Andrés Chávez	(Greece) Panathinaikos	Undisclosed
24 August 2017	MF	(Argentina) Fernando Zuqui	(Argentina) Estudiantes (LP)	Undisclosed

Players loaned
Start date	Pos.	Name	Club	End date
7 July 2017	MF	(Argentina) Franco Cristaldo	(Argentina) Defensa y Justicia	June 2018
8 July 2017	MF	(Argentina) Adrián Cubas	(Argentina) Defensa y Justicia	June 2018
19 July 2017	MF	(Argentina) Nicolás Colazo	(Argentina) Gimnasia y Esgrima (LP)	June 2018
July 2017	MF	(Argentina) Gonzalo Castellani	(Argentina) Defensa y Justicia	June 2018
July 2017	MF	(Argentina) Tomás Pochettino	(Argentina) Defensa y Justicia	June 2018
9 August 2017	FW	(Argentina) Ramón Ábila	(Argentina) Huracán	December 2017
24 August 2017	FW	(Argentina) Marcelo Torres	(Argentina) Talleres (C)	June 2018
3 September 2017	FW	(Argentina) Nazareno Solís	(Argentina) Huracán	June 2018

Loan Return
Date	Pos.	Name	Return to
30 June 2017	GK	(Argentina) Axel Werner	(Spain) Atlético Madrid
30 June 2017	DF	(Argentina) Jonathan Silva	(Portugal) Sporting CP
30 June 2017	DF	(Argentina) Fernando Tobio	(Brazil) Palmeiras
30 June 2017	MF	(Argentina) Ricardo Centurión	(Brazil) São Paulo

==== Summer ====
Players transferred
Date	Pos.	Name	Club	Fee
27 December 2017	FW	(Argentina) Agustín Bouzat	(Argentina) Vélez Sarsfield	Undisclosed
12 January 2018	DF	(Argentina) Fernando Evangelista	(Argentina) Newell's Old Boys	Free
31 January 2018	DF	(Argentina) Juan Manuel Insaurralde	(Chile) Colo-Colo	Free

Players loaned
Start date	Pos.	Name	Club	End date
11 January 2018	DF	(Argentina) Nahuel Molina Lucero	(Argentina) Defensa y Justicia	December 2018
3 February 2018	DF	(Argentina) Gino Peruzzi	(Uruguay) Nacional	June 2018

== Pre-season and friendlies ==
=== Winter ===
Win Draw Loss Postponed

July 29, 2017 Pre-season	Boca Juniors (Argentina)	1–1 (3–1 p)	(Uruguay) Nacional	Ciudad del Este, Paraguay
	Cardona 74'		Barcia 72'	Stadium: Estadio Antonio Aranda
	Penalties
	Cardona (penalty scored); Vergini (penalty scored); Chávez (penalty scored)		(penalty scored) Ramírez; (penalty missed) Silveira; (penalty missed) Rodríguez; (penalty missed) Barcia

August 2, 2017 Pre-season	Boca Juniors (Argentina)	1–0	(Spain) Villarreal	Buenos Aires, Argentina
21:30	Pavón 53'; Gago (penalty missed) 85'		Bonera (yellow card) 84'	Stadium: La Bombonera; Referee: Fernando Echenique

August 5, 2017 Pre-season	Boca Juniors	2–2	Colón	Buenos Aires, Argentina
	Benedetto; Cardona		Guanca; Conti	Stadium: La Bombonera

August 8, 2017 Pre-season	Boca Juniors	1–1 (4–2 p)	Banfield	Salta, Argentina
20:30	Cardona (yellow card) 30' (goal) 90+5'; Barrios (yellow card) 67'; Gago (yellow card) 83'		Sperduti 5'; Linares (red card) 90+4'	Stadium: Padre Ernesto Martearena; Referee: Pablo Dóvalo
	Penalties
	Cardona (penalty scored); Bou (penalty scored); Fabra (penalty scored); Gago (penalty scored)		(penalty missed) Gómez; (penalty missed) Bettini; (penalty scored) Civelli; (penalty scored) Rodríguez

August 19, 2017 Pre-season	Cerro Porteño (Paraguay)	1–2	(Argentina) Boca Juniors	Asunción, Paraguay
20:45	Churín 90'		Barrios 77'; Maroni 90+2'	Stadium: Estadio General Pablo Rojas; Referee: Ever Aquino

September 2, 2017 Mid-season	Boca Juniors	1–0	River Plate	San Juan, Argentina
16:15	Benítez 68'			Stadium: Estadio San Juan del Bicentenario; Referee: Diego Abal

October 6, 2017 Mid-season	San Martín (SJ)	1–0	Boca Juniors	San Juan, Argentina
21:15 UTC−3				Stadium: Estadio San Juan del Bicentenario

=== Summer ===
January 14, 2018 Torneos de Verano	Godoy Cruz	3–2	Boca Juniors	Mendoza, Argentina
22:10	García 17'; Garro 22'; Angileri 73'		Maroni 27'; Bou 67'	Stadium: Malvinas Argentinas

January 17, 2018 Torneos de Verano	Aldosivi	2–2	Boca Juniors	Mar del Plata, Argentina
22:10				Stadium: Estadio José María Minella

January 21, 2017 Copa Luis B. Nofal	Boca Juniors	0–1	River Plate	Mar del Plata, Argentina
22:10				Stadium: Estadio José María Minella

== Competitions ==
=== Overall ===
Competition	First match	Last match	Starting round	Final position	Record							
Competition	First match	Last match	Starting round	Final position	Pld	W	D	L	GF	GA	GD	Win %
Primera División	27 August 2017	May 2018	Matchday 1	Winners	27	18	4	5	50	22	+28	66.67
Copa Argentina	14 August 2017	27 September 2017	Round of 64	Round of 16	3	2	0	1	6	1	+5	66.67
Supercopa Argentina	14 March 2018		Final	Runners-up	1	0	0	1	0	2	−2	0.00
Copa Libertadores	1 March 2018	16 May 2018	Group stage	Round of 16^{1}	6	2	3	1	8	4	+4	33.33
Total					37	22	7	8	64	29	+35	59.46

Last updated: May 17, 2017
Source: Competitions

1: The final stages are played in the next season.

=== Primera División ===
==== League table ====
Pos	Team	Pld	W	D	L	GF	GA	GD	Pts	Qualification
1	Boca Juniors (C)	27	18	4	5	50	22	+28	58	Qualification for Copa Libertadores group stage
2	Godoy Cruz	27	17	5	5	45	24	+21	56	Qualification for Copa Libertadores group stage
3	San Lorenzo	27	14	8	5	31	20	+11	50	Qualification for Copa Libertadores group stage
4	Huracán	27	13	9	5	35	24	+11	48	Qualification for Copa Libertadores group stage
5	Talleres (C)	27	13	7	7	33	20	+13	46	Qualification for Copa Libertadores second stage

Source: AFA
Rules for classification: 1) points; 2) play-off (only if needed to decide championship); 3) goal difference; 4) goals scored; 5) head-to-head points; 6) head-to-head goal difference; 7) head-to-head goals scored.
(C) Champions

==== Relegation table ====
Pos	Team	2015 Pts	2016 Pts	2016–17 Pts	2017–18 Pts	Total Pts	Total Pld	Avg	Relegation
1	Boca Juniors	64	20	63	58	205	103	1.99	
2	San Lorenzo	61	34	53	50	198	103	1.922	
3	Racing	57	24	55	45	181	103	1.757	

==== Results summary ====
Overall								Home						Away					
Pld	W	D	L	GF	GA	GD	Pts	W	D	L	GF	GA	GD	W	D	L	GF	GA	GD
27	18	4	5	50	22	+28	58	12	0	2	32	10	+22	6	4	3	18	12	+6

Source: AFA

==== Results by round ====
Round	1	2	3	4	5	6	7	8	9	10	11	12	13	14	15	16	17	18	19	20	21	22	23	24	25	26	27
Ground	H	A	H	A	H	A	H	A	H	A	H	A	H	A	H	A	H	A	H	A	H	H	A	H	A	H	A
Result	W	W	W	W	W	W	W	W	L	L	W	W	W	D	W	W	W	L	W	D	W	L	L	W	W	W	D
Position	2	2	1	1	1	1	1	1	1	1	1	1	1	1	1	1	1	1	1	1	1	1	1	1	1	1	1

Source: AFA
A = Away; H = Home; W = Win; D = Draw; L = Loss

==== Matches ====
Win Draw Loss Postponed

August 27, 2017 1	Boca Juniors	3–0	Olimpo	Buenos Aires
18:05 UTC−3	Benedetto 7' (pen.), 84'; Pérez 41'	Report	Nasuti (yellow card) 52'; Villanueva (yellow card) 83'	Stadium: La Bombonera; Referee: Néstor Pitana

September 10, 2017 2	Lanús	0–1	Boca Juniors	Lanús
20:05 UTC−3	Herrera (yellow card) 3'; Plácido (yellow card) 40'; Silva (yellow card) 74'	Report	Pérez (yellow card) 42'; Barrios (yellow card) 58'; Cardona (yellow card) 69'; Benedetto 83'	Stadium: Ciudad de Lanús; Referee: Fernando Echenique

September 17, 2017 3	Boca Juniors	4–1	Godoy Cruz	Buenos Aires
18:05 UTC−3	Pérez 19', 39'; Pavón 67'; Nández 84'	Report	Garro (yellow card) 9'; Galeano 11'; Abecasis (yellow card) 48'	Stadium: La Bombonera; Referee: Germán Delfino

September 23, 2017 4	Vélez Sarsfield	0–4	Boca Juniors	Buenos Aires
18:05 UTC−3	Amor (yellow card) 12'; Cubero (yellow card) 27'; Gianetti (yellow card) 37'	Report	Benedetto 14', 50'; Jara (yellow card) 41'; Fabra (yellow card) 54' (goal) 85'; Domínguez 62' (o.g.)	Stadium: José Amalfitani; Referee: Fernando Espinoza

October 1, 2017 5	Boca Juniors	1–0	Chacarita Juniors	Buenos Aires
18:05 UTC−3	Pavón 2'; Cardona (yellow card) 12' (yellow-red card) 15'; Benedetto (yellow card) 43'; Barrios (yellow card) 87'	Report	Mellado (yellow card) 10' (yellow-red card) 53'; Ré (yellow card) 18'; Rosso (yellow card) 61'; Montoya (yellow card) 90+1'	Stadium: La Bombonera; Referee: Néstor Pitana

October 15, 2017 6	Patronato	0–2	Boca Juniors	Paraná
20:05 UTC−3	Márquez (yellow card) 26'; Cáceres (yellow card) 65'; Lemos (yellow card) 69'	Report	Nández (yellow card) 31'; Pavón 49'; Pérez (yellow card) 65'; Benedetto 79'	Stadium: Presbítero Bartolomé Grella; Referee: Facundo Tello

October 29, 2017 7	Boca Juniors	4–0	Belgrano	Buenos Aires
18:05 UTC−3	Acosta 15' (o.g.); Fabra (yellow card) 16'; Cardona 42'; Barrios (yellow card) 53'; Benedetto 62', 77'	Report	Figueroa (yellow card) 7'; Lértora (yellow card) 7'; Brunetta (yellow card) 53'; Godoy (yellow card) 72'; Riojas (red card) 90+1'	Stadium: La Bombonera; Referee: Silvio Trucco

November 5, 2017 8	River Plate	1–2	Boca Juniors	Buenos Aires
18:05 UTC−3	E. Pérez (yellow card) 17'; Pinola (yellow card) 20'; Fernández (red card) 37'; Lux (yellow card) 38'; Maidana (yellow card) 42'; Casco (yellow card) 54'; Ponzio 68'	Report	Nández (yellow card) 29' (goal) 72'; Cardona 41' (red card) 61'; Pérez (yellow card) 56'; Pavón (yellow card) 81'; Benedetto (yellow card) 86'	Stadium: Monumental Antonio Vespucio Liberti; Referee: Néstor Pitana

November 19, 2017 9	Boca Juniors	1–2	Racing Club	Buenos Aires
19:15 UTC−3	Benedetto 40' (pen.) (yellow card) 77'; Pérez (yellow card) 44'; Peruzzi (yellow card) 55'; Fabra (yellow card) 61'	Report	González (yellow card) 2'; Martínez 36'; Saravia (yellow card) 46'; Arévalo Ríos (yellow card) 50'; Solari 53'; Ibargüen (yellow card) 72'	Stadium: La Bombonera; Referee: Darío Herrera

November 26, 2017 10	Rosario Central	1–0	Boca Juniors	Rosario
21:30 UTC−3	Gil (yellow card) 1'; Ruben 3'; Camacho (yellow card) 31'; Lovera (yellow card) 76'; Tobio (yellow card) 86'; Zampedri (yellow card) 88'	Report	Goltz (yellow card) 35' (yellow-red card) 37'; Pérez (yellow card) 46'; Peruzzi (yellow card) 51'; Benítez (yellow card) 70'; Nández (yellow card) 78'	Stadium: Gigante de Arroyito; Referee: Patricio Loustau

December 3, 2017 11	Boca Juniors	2–0	Arsenal	Buenos Aires
19:15 UTC−3	Vadalá 34'; Cardona (yellow card) 55' (goal) 90+1'	Report	Papa (yellow card) 10'; Monteseirín (yellow card) 50'; Corvalán (yellow card) 57'; Ferreyra (red card) 82'; Velázquez (yellow card) 87'	Stadium: La Bombonera; Referee: Facundo Tello

December 10, 2017 12	Estudiantes (LP)	0–1	Boca Juniors	Quilmes
21:30 UTC−3	Braña (yellow card) 14'; Lattanzio (yellow card) 35'; Desábato (yellow card) 86'	Report	Pérez (yellow card) 63'; Barrios 75'; Vergini (yellow card) 86'; Vadalá (yellow card) 87'; Espinoza (yellow card) 90+1'; Evangelista (yellow card) 90+3'	Stadium: Estadio Centenario; Referee: Fernando Espinoza

January 27, 2018 13	Boca Juniors	2–0	Colón	Buenos Aires
21:30 UTC−3	Pavón 2'; Nández 64'	Report	Fritzler (yellow card) 23'; Ledesma (yellow card) 37'; Jonathan Galván (yellow card) 58'; Toledo (red card) 70'; Guanca (yellow card) 74'	Stadium: La Bombonera; Referee: Federico Beligoy

February 4, 2018 14	San Lorenzo	1–1	Boca Juniors	Buenos Aires
19:15 UTC−3	Botta 3'; Rojas (yellow card) 33' (yellow-red card) 82'; Quignon (yellow card) 35' (yellow-red card) 42'	Report	Tevez 14'; Fabra (yellow card) 34'; Barrios (yellow card) 66'	Stadium: Pedro Bidegain; Referee: Silvio Trucco

February 11, 2018 15	Boca Juniors	1–0	Temperley	Buenos Aires
19:15 UTC−3	Fabra 59'; Tevez (penalty missed) 81'; Ábila (yellow card) 82'	Report	Nani (yellow card) 29'; Bogino (yellow card) 68'; Scifo (yellow card) 72'	Stadium: La Bombonera; Referee: Ariel Penel

February 18, 2018 16	Banfield	0–1	Boca Juniors	Banfield
21:30 UTC−3	Bettini (yellow card) 50'; Colela (yellow card) 75'; Villagra (yellow card) 79'	Report	Tevez 2'; Jara (yellow card) 72'; Buffarini (yellow card) 81'	Stadium: Florencio Solá; Referee: Mauro Vigliano

February 25, 2018 17	Boca Juniors	4–2	San Martín (SJ)	Buenos Aires
19:15 UTC−3	Tevez 3'; Pavón 8'; Reynoso (yellow card) 32'; Cardona (yellow card) 46'; Nández 67'; Barrios (yellow card) 79'; Ábila 88'	Report	Fernández 12'; Escudero (yellow card) 25'; Vega (yellow card) 39'; Goitía (yellow card) 58'; Carabajal (yellow card) 83'; Spinelli 86'	Stadium: La Bombonera; Referee: Diego Abal

March 5, 2018 18	Argentinos Juniors	2–0	Boca Juniors	Buenos Aires
21:15 UTC−3	A. Mac Allister 9'; Cabrera (yellow card) 33'; Batallini 64'	Report	Cardona (yellow card) 38'; Vergini (yellow card) 59'; Pérez (yellow card) 62'; Buffarini (yellow card) 74'; Heredia (yellow card) 75'	Stadium: Diego Armando Maradona; Referee: Andrés Merlos

March 10, 2018 19	Boca Juniors	2–1	Tigre	Buenos Aires
19:15 UTC−3	Fabra (yellow card) 51'; Pérez (yellow card) 63'; Cardona 73' (pen.) (yellow card) 78'; Pavón (yellow card) 90'; Jara 90+4'	Report	Cardozo (yellow card) 32'; Alberto Morales (yellow card) 68'; González (yellow card) 70'; Chiarini (yellow card) 72'; Pérez Acuña 88'	Stadium: La Bombonera; Referee: Germán Delfino

March 18, 2018 20	Atlético Tucumán	1–1	Boca Juniors	San Miguel de Tucumán
17:45 UTC−3	Toledo 31'; Cabral (yellow card) 48'; Risso Patrón (yellow card) 62'; Aliendro (yellow card) 75'; Acosta (yellow card) 86'	Report	Barrios (yellow card) 52'; Pérez (yellow card) 62'; Bou 90'; Buffarini (yellow card) 90+5'	Stadium: Monumental José Fierro; Referee: Darío Herrera

April 1, 2018 21	Boca Juniors	2–1	Talleres (C)	Buenos Aires
17:45 UTC−3	Fabra (yellow card) 22'; Bou 27'; Pérez (yellow card) 45' (goal) 90+1'; Pavón (yellow card) 46'	Report	Godoy (yellow card) 37'; Quintana 45'; Olaza (yellow card) 85'; Guiñazú (yellow card) 90+1'	Stadium: La Bombonera; Referee: Federico Beligoy

April 7, 2018 22	Boca Juniors	1–2	Defensa y Justicia	Buenos Aires
20:00 UTC−3	Gissi 31' (o.g.)	Report	Márquez 4', 75' (yellow card) 76'; Pochettino (yellow card) 72'	Stadium: La Bombonera; Referee: Fernando Rapallini

April 15, 2018 23	Independiente	1–0	Boca Juniors	Buenos Aires
20:00 UTC−3	Silva (yellow card) 37'; Fernández (yellow card) 50'; Benítez 56'	Report	Vergini (yellow card) 8'; Mas (yellow card) 79'; Pérez (yellow card) 81' (yellow-red card) 90'; Nández (yellow card) 90+2'	Stadium: Libertadores de América; Referee: Ariel Penel

April 22, 2018 24	Boca Juniors	3–1	Newell's Old Boys	Buenos Aires
20:00 UTC−3	Pérez Cardona (yellow card) 2'; Ábila 26', 37'; Pavón 58'; Nández (yellow card) 85'; Buffarini (yellow card) 89'	Report	Sills (yellow card) 20'; Fértoli 38'; Varela (yellow card) 62'; Opazo (yellow card) 65'; Fontanini (yellow card) 77'; Bernardello (yellow card) 88'	Stadium: La Bombonera; Referee: Juan Pablo Pompei

May 6, 2018 26	Boca Juniors	2–0	Unión	Buenos Aires
17:45 UTC−3	Ábila 77', 87'	Report		Stadium: La Bombonera; Referee: Germán Delfino

May 9, 2018 25	Gimnasia y Esgrima (LP)	2–2	Boca Juniors	La Plata
19:15 UTC−3	Colazo 32'; Rinaudo (yellow card) 34'; Bonifacio (yellow card) 69'; Guanini (yellow card) 70'; Alemán 80'	Report	Pérez 12' (yellow card) 64'; Pérez Cardona (yellow card) 30'; Ábila 56'; Benítez (yellow card) 88'	Stadium: Juan Carmelo Zerillo; Referee: Facundo Tello
Note: Match postponed due to heavy rain.

May 12, 2018 27	Huracán	3–3	Boca Juniors	Buenos Aires
11:00 UTC−3	Pussetto 5'; Damonte (yellow card) 26'; Calello (yellow card) 37'; Mendoza 63'; Chávez 72'; Álvarez (yellow card) 90+3'	Report	Mas 31' (yellow card) 33'; Bou 34'; Benítez 43'; Chicco (yellow card) 51'; Almendra (yellow card) 73'	Stadium: Tomás Adolfo Ducó; Referee: Fernando Rapallini

=== Copa Argentina ===
==== Round of 64 ====
August 14, 2017	Boca Juniors	5–0	Gimnasia y Tiro	Formosa
21:10 UTC−3	Pérez (yellow card) 20' (goal) 32'; Cardona 38'; Fabra 50'; Benedetto 78', 87'	Report	Motta (yellow card) 20'; Ceratto (yellow card) 65'	Stadium: Estadio Antonio Romero; Referee: Pablo Echavarría

==== Round of 32 ====
September 13, 2017	Guillermo Brown	0–1	Boca Juniors	Mendoza
20:10 UTC−3	Solís (yellow card) 24'; Palma (yellow card) 65'	Report	Benedetto 60' (pen.) (yellow card) 76'; Peruzzi (yellow card) 90+2'	Stadium: Malvinas Argentinas; Referee: Facundo Tello

==== Round of 16 ====
September 27, 2017	Rosario Central	1–0	Boca Juniors	Mendoza
21:10 UTC−3	Martínez 25' (yellow card) 55'; Leguizamón (yellow card) 47'; Ruben (yellow card) 48'; Romero (yellow card) 53'; Gil (yellow card) 76' (yellow-red card) 90+2'	Report	Magallán (yellow card) 54'	Stadium: Malvinas Argentinas; Referee: Fernando Rapallini

=== Supercopa Argentina ===
March 14, 2018	Boca Juniors	0–2	River Plate	Mendoza
UTC−3	Fabra (yellow card) 26'; Barrios (yellow card) 39'; Nández (yellow card) 42'; Pérez (yellow card) 80'; Tevez (yellow card) 88'	Report	Ponzio (yellow card) 9'; Martínez 7' (pen.); Fernández (yellow card) 48'; Scocco 70'	Stadium: Malvinas Argentinas; Referee: Patricio Loustau

=== Copa Libertadores ===
==== Group stage ====
Pos	Team	Pld	W	D	L	GF	GA	GD	Pts	Qualification	PAL	BOC	JUN	ALI
1	(Brazil) Palmeiras	6	5	1	0	14	3	+11	16	Round of 16	—	1–1	3–1	2–0
2	(Argentina) Boca Juniors	6	2	3	1	8	4	+4	9	Round of 16	0–2	—	1–0	5–0
3	(Colombia) Junior	6	2	1	3	5	8	−3	7	Copa Sudamericana	0–3	1–1	—	1–0
4	(Peru) Alianza Lima	6	0	1	5	1	13	−12	1		1–3	0–0	0–2	—

Source: CONMEBOL

March 1, 2018 1	Alianza Lima (Peru)	0–0	(Argentina) Boca Juniors	Lima, Peru
19:30 UTC−5	Costa (yellow card) 52'; Ascues (yellow card) 78'	Report	Vergini (yellow card) 42'; Barrios (yellow card) 43'	Stadium: Estadio Nacional; Referee: Daniel Fedorczuk (Uruguay)

April 4, 2018 2	Boca Juniors (Argentina)	1–0	(Colombia) Junior	Buenos Aires, Argentina
21:45 UTC−3	Pavón 27'; Mas (yellow card) 64'; Ábila (penalty missed) 66'; Goltz (yellow card) 88'	Report	Murillo (yellow card) 37'; Ruiz (yellow card) 85'	Stadium: La Bombonera; Referee: Ulises Mereles (Paraguay)

April 11, 2018 3	Palmeiras (Brazil)	1–1	(Argentina) Boca Juniors	São Paulo, Brazil
21:45 UTC−3	Felipe Melo (yellow card) 12'; Keno 89'	Report	Magallán (yellow card) 37'; Tevez 90+1'	Stadium: Allianz Parque; Referee: Andrés Cunha (Uruguay)

April 25, 2018 4	Boca Juniors (Argentina)	0–2	(Brazil) Palmeiras	Buenos Aires, Argentina
21:45 UTC−3	Ábila (yellow card) 40'; Magallán (yellow card) 41'; Pérez (yellow card) 77'; Nández (yellow card) 86'	Report	Keno 39' (yellow card) 54'; Lucas Lima 66'; Marcos Rocha (yellow card) 75'; Hyoran (yellow card) 87'	Stadium: La Bombonera; Referee: Roberto Tobar (Chile)

May 2, 2018 5	Junior (Colombia)	1–1	(Argentina) Boca Juniors	Barranquilla, Colombia
17:15 UTC−5	R. Pérez (yellow card) 20'; Ruiz (penalty missed) 32' 32'	Report	Fabra (yellow card) 13'; Magallán (yellow card) 20'; Ruiz 50' (o.g.)	Stadium: Estadio Metropolitano Roberto Meléndez; Referee: Roddy Zambrano (Ecuador)

May 16, 2018 6	Boca Juniors (Argentina)	5–0	(Peru) Alianza Lima	Buenos Aires, Argentina
21:45 UTC−3	Cardona 11'; Pérez (yellow card) 17'; Fabra 19'; Ábila 34', 41'; Tevez 54'	Report	Cruzado (yellow card) 24'	Stadium: La Bombonera; Referee: Mario Díaz de Vivar (Paraguay)

== Team statistics ==
	Total	Home	Away	Neutral
Games played	37	17	16	4
Games won	22	14	6	2
Games drawn	7	None	7	None
Games lost	8	3	3	2
Biggest win	5-0 vs Gimnasia y Tiro; 5-0 vs Alianza Lima	5-0 vs Alianza Lima	4-0 vs Vélez Sarsfield	5-0 vs Gimnasia y Tiro
Biggest loss	0-2 vs Argentinos Juniors; 0-2 vs Palmeiras	0-2 vs Palmeiras	0-2 vs Argentinos Juniors	0-2 vs River Plate
Biggest win (Primera División)	4-0 vs Belgrano; 4-0 vs Vélez Sarsfield	4-0 vs Belgrano	4-0 vs Vélez Sarsfield	None
Biggest win (Copa Argentina)	5-0 vs Gimnasia y Tiro	None		5-0 vs Gimnasia y Tiro
Biggest win (Supercopa Argentina)	None			
Biggest win (Copa Libertadores)	5-0 vs Alianza Lima	5-0 vs Alianza Lima	None	
Biggest loss (Primera División)	0-2 vs Argentinos Juniors	1-2 vs Racing Club; 1-2 vs Defensa y Justicia	0-2 vs Argentinos Juniors	None
Biggest loss (Copa Argentina)	0-1 vs Rosario Central	None		0-1 vs Rosario Central
Biggest loss (Supercopa Argentina)	0-2 vs River Plate	None		0-2 vs River Plate
Biggest loss (Copa Libertadores)	0-2 vs Palmeiras	0-2 vs Palmeiras	None	
Clean sheets	17	9	6	2
Goals scored	64	38	20	6
Goals conceded	29	12	14	3
Goal difference	+35	+26	+6	+3
Yellow cards	85	30	46	9
Red cards	4	1	3	
Top scorer	Benedetto (12)	Ábila (8)	Benedetto (4)	Benedetto (3)
Worst discipline	Cardona (2 RC)	Cardona (1 RC)	Cardona (1 RC)	
Penalties for	6	5		1
Penalties against	1			1

=== Season appearances and goals ===
Last updated on May 17, 2018

No.	Pos	Nat	Player	Total		Primera División		Copa Argentina		Supercopa Argentina		Copa Libertadores	
No.	Pos	Nat	Player	Apps	Goals	Apps	Goals	Apps	Goals	Apps	Goals	Apps	Goals
Goalkeepers
1	GK	(Argentina) ARG	Guillermo Sara	3	-4	1	-3	2	-1	0	0	0	0
12	GK	(Argentina) ARG	Agustín Rossi	34	-25	26	-19	1	0	1	-2	6	-4
Defenders
2	DF	(Argentina) ARG	Paolo Goltz	25	0	19	0	3	0	1	0	2	0
3	DF	(Argentina) ARG	Emmanuel Mas	8	1	5+1	1	0	0	0	0	2	0
6	DF	(Argentina) ARG	Lisandro Magallán	34	0	25	0	3	0	1	0	5	0
18	DF	(Colombia) COL	Frank Fabra	28	4	21	2	2	1	1	0	4	1
21	DF	(Argentina) ARG	Agustín Heredia	3	0	2	0	0	0	0	0	1	0
24	DF	(Argentina) ARG	Julio Buffarini	16	0	4+8	0	0	0	0	0	1+3	0
27	DF	(Argentina) ARG	Santiago Vergini	13	0	7+1	0	0	0	0	0	4+1	0
36	DF	(Argentina) ARG	Gonzalo Goñi	1	0	1	0	0	0	0	0	0	0
Midfielders
5	MF	(Argentina) ARG	Fernando Gago	10	0	6	0	2+1	0	0	0	0+1	0
8	MF	(Argentina) ARG	Pablo Pérez	28	6	18+1	5	3	1	1	0	5	0
10	MF	(Colombia) COL	Edwin Cardona	29	6	19+1	4	2+1	1	1	0	3+2	1
14	MF	(Colombia) COL	Sebastián Pérez Cardona	7	0	3	0	0	0	0	0	1+3	0
15	MF	(Uruguay) URU	Nahitan Nández	29	4	20+4	4	1	0	1	0	3	0
16	MF	(Colombia) COL	Wílmar Barrios	31	1	23	1	3	0	1	0	4	0
20	MF	(Argentina) ARG	Gonzalo Maroni	6	0	0+6	0	0	0	0	0	0	0
29	MF	(Argentina) ARG	Leonardo Jara	31	1	20+2	1	2	0	1	0	6	0
30	MF	(Argentina) ARG	Emanuel Reynoso	16	0	8+3	0	0	0	0	0	4+1	0
33	MF	(Argentina) ARG	Gonzalo Lamardo	1	0	0+1	0	0	0	0	0	0	0
39	MF	(Argentina) ARG	Agustín Almendra	3	0	1+2	0	0	0	0	0	0	0
40	MF	(Argentina) ARG	Julián Chicco	2	0	1+1	0	0	0	0	0	0	0
Forwards
7	FW	(Argentina) ARG	Cristian Pavón	36	7	26	6	3	0	1	0	6	1
9	FW	(Argentina) ARG	Darío Benedetto	12	12	9	9	3	3	0	0	0	0
11	FW	(Argentina) ARG	Cristian Espinoza	14	0	4+7	0	0+1	0	0	0	1+1	0
17	MF	(Argentina) ARG	Ramón Ábila	16	8	5+6	6	0	0	0+1	0	4	2
19	FW	(Argentina) ARG	Walter Bou	21	3	6+10	3	0+2	0	0	0	0+3	0
22	FW	(Argentina) ARG	Oscar Benítez	15	1	2+12	1	1	0	0	0	0	0
32	FW	(Argentina) ARG	Carlos Tevez	16	5	10	3	0	0	1	0	4+1	2
34	MF	(Argentina) ARG	Guido Vadalá	4	1	2+2	1	0	0	0	0	0	0
Players transferred out during the season:
4	DF	(Argentina) ARG	Gino Peruzzi	7	0	3+3	0	1	0	0	0	0	0
25	DF	(Argentina) ARG	Juan Manuel Insaurralde	1	0	0+1	0	0	0	0	0	0	0
32	DF	(Argentina) ARG	Fernando Evangelista	2	0	0+1	0	1	0	0	0	0	0
35	DF	(Argentina) ARG	Nahuel Molina Lucero	0	0	0	0	0	0	0	0	0	0
30	FW	(Argentina) ARG	Agustín Bouzat	5	0	0+3	0	0+2	0	0	0	0	0

=== Top scorers ===
Last updated on May 17, 2018

Rank	Pos.	No.	Name	Primera División	Copa Argentina	Supercopa Argentina	Copa Libertadores	Total
1	FW	9	(Argentina) Darío Benedetto	9	3	—		12
2	FW	17	(Argentina) Ramón Ábila	6		—	2	8
3	FW	7	(Argentina) Cristian Pavón	6		—	1	7
4	MF	8	(Argentina) Pablo Pérez	5	1	—		6
5	MF	10	(Colombia) Edwin Cardona	4	1	—	1	6
6	FW	32	(Argentina) Carlos Tevez	3		—	2	5
7	MF	15	(Uruguay) Nahitan Nández	4		—		4
8	DF	18	(Colombia) Frank Fabra	2	1	—	1	4
8	FW	19	(Argentina) Walter Bou	3		—		3
10	FW	34	(Argentina) Guido Vadalá	1		—		1
11	MF	16	(Colombia) Wílmar Barrios	1		—		1
12	DF	29	(Argentina) Leonardo Jara	1		—		1
13	DF	3	(Argentina) Emmanuel Mas	1		—		1
14	FW	22	(Argentina) Oscar Benítez	1		—		1
Own goals				3		—	1	4
Total				50	6	—	8	64

=== Clean sheets ===
Last updated on May 17, 2018

Rank	Pos.	No.	Name	Primera División	Copa Argentina	Supercopa Argentina	Copa Libertadores	Total
1	GK	12	(Argentina) Agustín Rossi	12	1	—	3	16
2	GK	1	(Argentina) Guillermo Sara		1	—		1
Total				12	2	—	3	17

=== Disciplinary record ===
Last updated on May 17, 2018

No.	Pos	Nat	Name	Primera División			Copa Argentina			Supercopa Argentina			Copa Libertadores			Total		
No.	Pos	Nat	Name	Booked	(yellow card) (yellow-red card)	Sent off (straight red)	Booked	(yellow card) (yellow-red card)	Sent off (straight red)	Booked	(yellow card) (yellow-red card)	Sent off (straight red)	Booked	(yellow card) (yellow-red card)	Sent off (straight red)	Booked	(yellow card) (yellow-red card)	Sent off (straight red)
Goalkeepers
1	GK	(Argentina)	Guillermo Sara															
12	GK	(Argentina)	Agustín Rossi															
Defenders
2	DF	(Argentina)	Paolo Goltz		1								1			1	1	
3	DF	(Argentina)	Emmanuel Mas	2									2			2		
6	DF	(Argentina)	Lisandro Magallán				1						3			4		
18	DF	(Colombia)	Frank Fabra	6						1			1			8		
21	DF	(Argentina)	Agustín Heredia	1												1		
24	DF	(Argentina)	Julio Buffarini	4												4		
27	DF	(Argentina)	Santiago Vergini	3									1			4		
36	DF	(Argentina)	Gonzalo Goñi															
Midfielders
5	MF	(Argentina)	Fernando Gago															
8	MF	(Argentina)	Pablo Pérez	11	1		1			1			2			15	1	
10	MF	(Colombia)	Edwin Cardona	5	1	1										5	1	1
14	MF	(Colombia)	Sebastián Pérez Cardona	2												2		
15	MF	(Uruguay)	Nahitan Nández	5						1			1			7		
16	MF	(Colombia)	Wílmar Barrios	6						1			1			8		
20	MF	(Argentina)	Gonzalo Maroni															
29	MF	(Argentina)	Leonardo Jara	2												2		
30	MF	(Argentina)	Emanuel Reynoso	1												1		
33	MF	(Argentina)	Gonzalo Lamardo															
39	MF	(Argentina)	Agustín Almendra	1												1		
40	MF	(Argentina)	Julián Chicco	1												1		
Forwards
7	FW	(Argentina)	Cristian Pavón	3												3		
9	FW	(Argentina)	Darío Benedetto	3			1									4		
11	FW	(Argentina)	Cristian Espinoza	1												1		
17	FW	(Argentina)	Ramón Ábila	1									1			2		
19	FW	(Argentina)	Walter Bou															
22	FW	(Argentina)	Oscar Benítez	2												2		
32	FW	(Argentina)	Carlos Tevez							1						1		
34	FW	(Argentina)	Guido Vadalá	1												1		
Players transferred out during the season
4	DF	(Argentina)	Gino Peruzzi	2			1									3		
25	DF	(Argentina)	Juan Manuel Insaurralde															
32	DF	(Argentina)	Fernando Evangelista	1												1		
35	DF	(Argentina)	Nahuel Molina Lucero															
30	FW	(Argentina)	Agustín Bouzat															
Total				64	3	1	4			5			12			85	3	1
