= Alan Robledo =

Argentine footballer

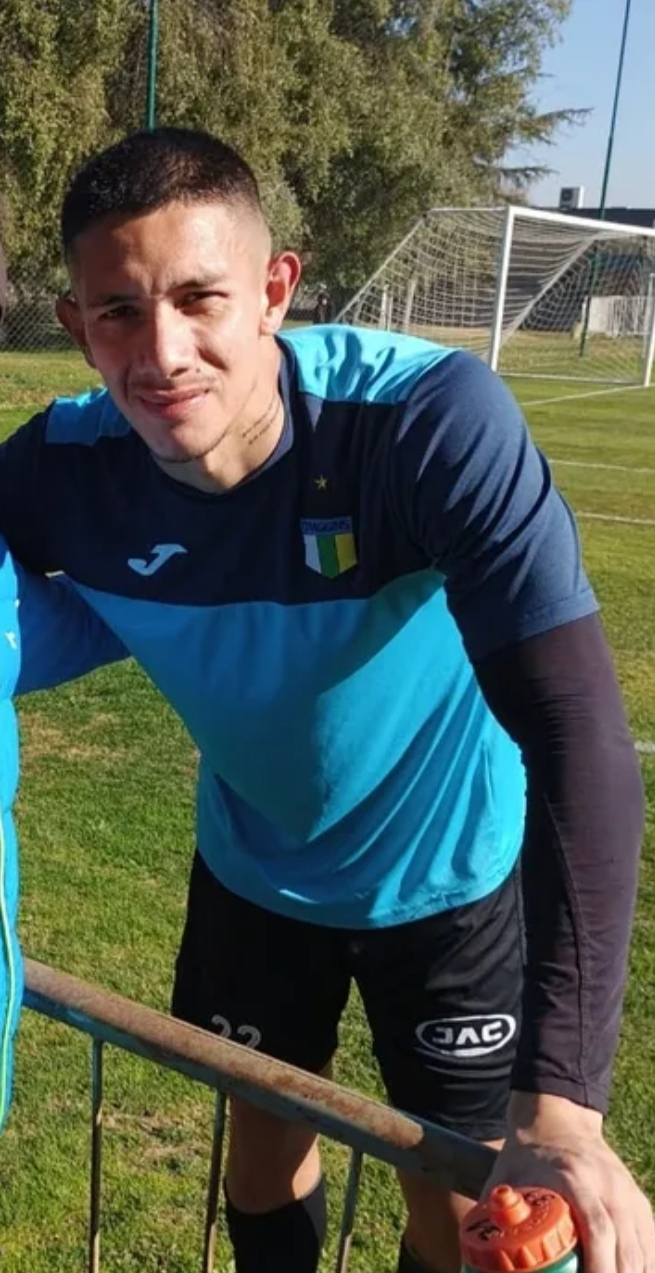
- Robledo with O'Higgins in 2025

Personal information
- Full name: Alan Ariel Robledo
- Date of birth: 17 February 1998 (age 28)
- Place of birth: José León Suarez, Argentina
- Height: 1.83 m (6 ft 0 in)
- Position: Centre-back

Team information
- Current team: O'Higgins
- Number: 22

Youth career
- Chacarita Juniors

Senior career*
Years	Team	Apps	(Gls)
2016–2021	Chacarita Juniors	40	(0)
2021–2024	Alvarado	106	(3)
2025–	O'Higgins	23	(1)
- * Club domestic league appearances and goals as of 3 February 2026

Alan Ariel Robledo (born 17 February 1998) is an Argentine professional footballer who plays as a centre-back for Chilean club O'Higgins.

== Career ==
Robledo began his senior footballing career with Chacarita Juniors in Primera B Nacional. He first appeared on a teamsheet in November 2016 in a 3–0 defeat against Almagro, four further unused substitute appearances followed in 2016–17 until he made his professional debut on 10 May 2017 in a home loss to Brown; he played the full ninety minutes. At the end of 2016–17, Chacarita were promoted to the Argentine Primera División. His first appearance in the top-flight arrived on 29 October versus Newell's Old Boys.

On 29 June 2021, Robledo joined Alvarado.

Robledo signed with Chilean Primera División club O'Higgins for the 2025 season.

== Career statistics ==
As of 5 August 2018.

Club statistics
Club	Season	League			Cup (Note: Includes the Copa Argentina)		League Cup		Continental		Other		Total	
Club	Season	Division	Apps	Goals	Apps	Goals	Apps	Goals	Apps	Goals	Apps	Goals	Apps	Goals
Chacarita Juniors	2016–17	Primera B Nacional	1	0	1	0	—		—		0	0	2	0
Chacarita Juniors	2017–18	Primera División	4	0	0	0	—		—		0	0	4	0
Chacarita Juniors	2018–19	Primera B Nacional	0	0	0	0	—		—		0	0	0	0
Career total			5	0	1	0	—		—		0	0	6	0
