= Fabián Sánchez (footballer, born 2001) =

Argentine professional footballer

Personal information
- Full name: Sergio Fabián Rafael Sánchez
- Date of birth: 22 July 1998 (age 28)
- Place of birth: Coatzacoalcos, Mexico
- Height: 1.68 m (5 ft 6 in)
- Position: Left-back

Team information
- Current team: Defensores de Belgrano
- Number: 3

Youth career
- Club Atlético Banfield Puerto Mar Del Plata
- River Plate
- Boca Juniors
- Aldosivi
- 2016–2020: Racing Club

Senior career*
Years	Team	Apps	(Gls)
2020–2026	Racing Club	3	(0)
2022	→ Alvarado (loan)	9	(0)
2023–2024	→ Defensores de Belgrano (loan)	51	(1)
2026–	Defensores de Belgrano	4	(0)
- * Club domestic league appearances and goals as of 17:47, 17 March 2026 (UTC)

Sergio Fabián Sánchez (born 17 August 2001) is an Argentine professional footballer who plays as a left-back for Defensores de Belgrano.

== Career ==
Sánchez began his youth career with Banfield at the age of six, before having stints with the academies of River Plate and Boca Juniors. A move to Aldosivi then followed, before his arrival at Racing Club in 2016. Sánchez made the breakthrough into their first-team in October 2020, featuring as an unused substitute for a Copa Libertadores group stage win over Venezuela's Estudiantes de Mérida. He did likewise in early November for three Copa de la Liga Profesional matches, which preceded his senior debut in that competition against Atlético Tucumán on 19 November; he played every minute of a 2–0 away loss. In February 2022, Sánchez joined Alvarado on a one-year loan deal.

== Style of play ==
After starting out as a midfielder, Sánchez transitioned into a left-back whilst with the Racing Club reserves.

== Career statistics ==
As of 20 November 2020.

Appearances and goals by club, season and competition
Club	Season	League			Cup		League Cup		Continental		Other		Total	
Club	Season	Division	Apps	Goals	Apps	Goals	Apps	Goals	Apps	Goals	Apps	Goals	Apps	Goals
Racing Club	2020–21 (Note: Soccerway counts Copa de la Liga Profesional appearances as league appearances.)	Primera División	1	0	0	0	0	0	0	0	0	0	1	0
Career total			1	0	0	0	0	0	0	0	0	0	1	0
