= Pedro Fernández (Argentine footballer) =

Argentine footballer

Personal information
- Full name: Pedro Nahuel Fernández
- Date of birth: 5 April 1987 (age 39)
- Place of birth: Villa Adelina, Argentina
- Height: 1.90 m (6 ft 3 in)
- Position: Goalkeeper

Team information
- Current team: Alvorado

Youth career
- Chacarita Juniors

Senior career*
Years	Team	Apps	(Gls)
2009–2019	Chacarita Juniors	90	(0)
2013–2015	→ Villa Dálmine (loan)	27	(0)
2019–2020	San Martín Tucumán	2	(0)
2020–	Alvorado	56	(0)
- * Club domestic league appearances and goals as of 17:58, 14 June 2022 (UTC)

Pedro Nahuel Fernández (born 5 April 1987) is an Argentine professional footballer who plays as a goalkeeper for Alvorado.

== Career ==
Fernández made his professional debut in June 2009 with Chacarita Juniors in Primera B Nacional, he played the full ninety minutes in a draw with San Martín (SJ). One more appearance followed in 2008–09, prior to none in 2009–10 and 2010–11 but two came in 2011–12 as Chacarita were relegated to Primera B Metropolitana. In the third tier, Fernández made eight appearances. In June 2013, Fernández completed a loan move to fellow Primera B Metropolitana team Villa Dálmine. Nineteen appearances followed in 2013–14 and 2014, the latter ended in promotion to Primera B Nacional; where Chacarita were also promoted.

He spent one more season with Villa Dálmine, 2015, which included eight appearances, he then returned to Chacarita ahead of 2016 campaign. In 2016–17, Fernández played nineteen times as the club won promotion to the Primera División. He subsequently made his top-flight debut on 10 September 2017 against Tigre. Fernández's 100th career appearance came on 4 March 2018 during a draw away to River Plate. Fernández terminated his contract with the club in January 2019, eight months after they returned to Primera B Nacional, prior to joining an San Martín of the Primera División.

In July 2020, Fernández joined Alvorado.

== Career statistics ==
As of 23 September 2022.

Club statistics
Club	Season	League			Cup		Continental		Other		Total	
Club	Season	Division	Apps	Goals	Apps	Goals	Apps	Goals	Apps	Goals	Apps	Goals
Chacarita Juniors	2008–09	Primera B Nacional	2	0	0	0	—		0	0	2	0
Chacarita Juniors	2009–10	Primera División	0	0	0	0	—		0	0	0	0
Chacarita Juniors	2010–11	Primera B Nacional	0	0	0	0	—		0	0	0	0
Chacarita Juniors	2011–12	Primera B Nacional	2	0	1	0	—		0	0	3	0
Chacarita Juniors	2012–13	Primera B Metropolitana	8	0	1	0	—		0	0	9	0
Chacarita Juniors	2013–14	Primera B Metropolitana	0	0	0	0	—		0	0	0	0
Chacarita Juniors	2014	Primera B Metropolitana	0	0	0	0	—		0	0	0	0
Chacarita Juniors	2015	Primera B Nacional	0	0	0	0	—		0	0	0	0
Chacarita Juniors	2016	Primera B Nacional	21	0	0	0	—		0	0	21	0
Chacarita Juniors	2016–17	Primera B Nacional	19	0	0	0	—		0	0	19	0
Chacarita Juniors	2017–18	Primera División	26	0	1	0	—		0	0	27	0
Chacarita Juniors	2018–19	Primera B Nacional	12	0	0	0	—		0	0	12	0
Chacarita Juniors	Total		90	0	3	0	—		0	0	93	0
Villa Dálmine (loan)	2013–14	Primera B Metropolitana	6	0	1	0	—		0	0	7	0
Villa Dálmine (loan)	2014	Primera B Metropolitana	13	0	0	0	—		0	0	13	0
Villa Dálmine (loan)	2015	Primera B Nacional	8	0	0	0	—		0	0	8	0
Villa Dálmine (loan)	Total		27	0	1	0	—		0	0	28	0
San Martín	2018–19	Primera División	2	0	3	0	—		0	0	5	0
San Martín	2019-20	Primera División	0	0	0	0	—		0	0	0	0
San Martín	Total		2	0	3	0	—		0	0	5	0
CA Alvarado	2020	Primera Nacional	7	0	1	0	—		0	0	8	0
CA Alvarado	2021	Primera Nacional	32	0	0	0	—		0	0	32	0
CA Alvarado	2022	Primera Nacional	30	0	0	0	—		0	0	30	0
CA Alvarado	Total		69	0	1	0	—		0	0	70	0
Career total			188	0	8	0	—		0	0	196	0
