= Facundo Ferrero =

Argentine footballer

Personal information
- Date of birth: 5 March 1995 (age 31)
- Place of birth: La Reja, Argentina
- Height: 1.84 m (6 ft 0 in)
- Position: Goalkeeper

Team information
- Current team: Nueva Chicago
- Number: 1

Senior career*
Years	Team	Apps	(Gls)
2012–2016	Deportivo Merlo	10	(0)
2016–2018	Chacarita Juniors	0	(0)
2018–2020	Atlanta	2	(0)
2021–2024	Sarmiento	2	(0)
2022	→ Guillermo Brown (loan)	10	(0)
2023–2024	→ Nueva Chicago (loan)	43	(0)
2025–	Nueva Chicago	18	(0)

International career
2016	Argentina U23	3	(0)
- * Club domestic league appearances and goals as of 17:58, 19 June 2025 (UTC)

Facundo Ferrero (born 5 March 1995) is an Argentine footballer who plays as a goalkeeper for Nueva Chicago.

== Career ==
=== Club ===
Ferrero's career began in 2012 with Primera B Nacional team Deportivo Merlo, he appeared on the club's substitutes bench throughout 2012–13 in matches against Almirante Brown, Gimnasia y Esgrima and Rosario Central but was unused; Merlo were relegated in that season to Primera B Metropolitana. Ferrero made his professional debut on 25 May 2014 in a home league defeat to Fénix. Over the next year, Ferrero played a total of nine more games for the club. In January 2016, Ferrero joined Chacarita Juniors of Primera B Nacional. Despite being on the bench nineteen times in 2016–17, Ferrero left in July 2018 following zero appearances.

Primera B Metropolitana's Atlanta signed Ferrero soon after his release from Chacarita Juniors.

=== International ===
Ferrero was selected by the Argentina U23 squad for the 2016 Sait Nagjee Trophy. He featured in two matches, versus 1860 Munich II and Dnipro-2, as Argentina finished bottom of Group A. He also featured in a pre-tournament friendly against Deportivo Laferrere.

== Career statistics ==
As of 11 September 2018.

Club statistics
Club	Season	League			Cup (Note: Includes the Copa Argentina)		League Cup		Continental		Other		Total	
Club	Season	Division	Apps	Goals	Apps	Goals	Apps	Goals	Apps	Goals	Apps	Goals	Apps	Goals
Deportivo Merlo	2012–13	Primera B Nacional	0	0	0	0	—		—		0	0	0	0
Deportivo Merlo	2013–14	Primera B Metropolitana	1	0	0	0	—		—		0	0	1	0
Deportivo Merlo	2014	Primera B Metropolitana	1	0	0	0	—		—		0	0	1	0
Deportivo Merlo	2015	Primera B Metropolitana	8	0	2	0	—		—		0	0	10	0
Deportivo Merlo	Total		10	0	2	0	—		—		0	0	12	0
Chacarita Juniors	2016	Primera B Nacional	0	0	0	0	—		—		0	0	0	0
Chacarita Juniors	2016–17	Primera B Nacional	0	0	0	0	—		—		0	0	0	0
Chacarita Juniors	2017–18	Primera División	0	0	0	0	—		—		0	0	0	0
Chacarita Juniors	Total		0	0	0	0	—		—		0	0	0	0
Atlanta	2018–19	Primera B Metropolitana	0	0	0	0	—		—		0	0	0	0
Career total			10	0	2	0	—		—		0	0	12	0
