= Gonzalo Lamardo =

Argentine footballer

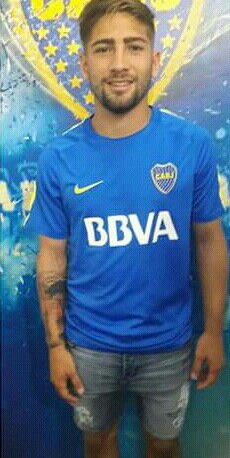

Personal information
- Full name: Gonzalo Agustín Lamardo
- Date of birth: 25 April 1997 (age 29)
- Place of birth: Lincoln, Argentina
- Height: 1.68 m (5 ft 6 in)
- Position: Attacking midfielder

Team information
- Current team: Alvarado

Youth career
- Club La Ribera
- 2013–2017: Boca Juniors

Senior career*
Years	Team	Apps	(Gls)
2017–2021	Boca Juniors	1	(0)
2019	→ San Martín T. (loan)	7	(0)
2020	→ Cerro Largo (loan)	26	(0)
2022–	Alvarado	17	(1)
- * Club domestic league appearances and goals as of 18:41, 14 June 2022 (UTC)

Gonzalo Agustín Lamardo (born 25 April 1997) is an Argentine professional footballer who plays as an attacking midfielder for Alvarado.

== Career ==
Lamardo arrived to the Boca Juniors youth ranks in 2013 after a spell with Club La Ribera, prior to making his professional career debut on 3 December 2017 in a 2–0 win in the Primera División against Arsenal de Sarandí. Lamardo departed on loan in January 2019, signing for fellow Primera División team San Martín.

== Personal life ==
In November 2018, whilst travelling to face River Plate in the 2018 Copa Libertadores finals, Lamardo reportedly suffered a head laceration from broken glass after Boca's team bus was attacked.

== Career statistics ==
As of 13 July 2019.

Club statistics
Club	Season	League			Cup		League Cup		Continental		Other		Total	
Club	Season	Division	Apps	Goals	Apps	Goals	Apps	Goals	Apps	Goals	Apps	Goals	Apps	Goals
Boca Juniors	2017–18	Primera División	1	0	0	0	—		0	0	0	0	1	0
Boca Juniors	2018–19	Primera División	0	0	0	0	0	0	0	0	0	0	0	0
Boca Juniors	Total		1	0	0	0	0	0	0	0	0	0	1	0
San Martín (loan)	2018–19	Primera División	6	0	1	0	2	0	—		0	0	9	0
Career total			7	0	1	0	2	0	0	0	0	0	10	0

== Honours ==
Boca Juniors

- Primera División: 2017–18
