= Matías Rosso =

Argentine footballer

Personal information
- Full name: Matías Gabriel Rosso
- Date of birth: 12 March 1993 (age 33)
- Place of birth: Rosario, Argentina
- Height: 1.82 m (5 ft 11 1/2 in)
- Position: Midfielder

Senior career*
Years	Team	Apps	(Gls)
2013–2015	Chacarita Juniors	44	(7)
2015–2018	Estudiantes (LP)	6	(0)
2016	→ Aldosivi (loan)	3	(0)
2016	→ Chacarita Juniors (loan)	0	(0)
2017	→ Estudiantes (BA) (loan)	24	(3)
2018–2019	Gimnasia y Tiro	12	(0)
- * Club domestic league appearances and goals

Matías Gabriel Rosso (born 12 March 1993) is an Argentine former professional footballer who played as a midfielder.

== Career ==
Chacarita Juniors of the Primera B Metropolitana were Rosso's first senior club, he joined their first-team in 2013 and made his professional debut in August in a goalless draw with Tristán Suárez. He scored the first goal of his career on 3 November against Villa Dálmine. In total, Rosso scored six goals in twenty-nine games in his debut campaign. Four goals in nineteen followed in 2014 as Chacarita won promotion to Primera B Nacional. Rosso was subsequently signed by Argentine Primera División side Estudiantes (LP) in January 2015. His debut came on 13 February vs. Independiente del Valle in the Copa Libertadores.

After eight games for Estudiantes (LP), Rosso departed to join Aldosivi on loan in January 2016. His stay was short as he returned to La Plata following just three appearances. On 8 July, Rosso rejoined Chacarita Juniors on loan. However, he returned to his parent club six months later as he failed to make an appearance, appearing on the bench once. Rosso completed a third loan away from Estudiantes (LP) to join their namesakes - Estudiantes (BA). He remained with Estudiantes (BA) for two seasons and made ten appearances, he also scored on his debut; a 3–2 Primera B Metropolitana win over Talleres.

== Career statistics ==
As of 9 January 2018.

Club statistics
Club	Season	League			Cup (Note: Includes the Copa Argentina)		League Cup		Continental (Note: Includes the Copa Libertadores and Copa Sudamericana)		Other		Total	
Club	Season	Division	Apps	Goals	Apps	Goals	Apps	Goals	Apps	Goals	Apps	Goals	Apps	Goals
Chacarita Juniors	2013–14	Primera B Metropolitana	25	3	4	3	—		—		0	0	29	6
Chacarita Juniors	2014	Primera B Metropolitana	19	4	0	0	—		—		0	0	19	4
Chacarita Juniors	Total		44	7	4	3	—		—		0	0	48	10
Estudiantes (LP)	2015	Primera División	6	0	0	0	—		2 (Note: Two appearances in 2015 Copa Libertadores)	0	0	0	8	0
Estudiantes (LP)	2016	Primera División	0	0	0	0	—		0	0	0	0	0	0
Estudiantes (LP)	2016–17	Primera División	0	0	0	0	—		0	0	0	0	0	0
Estudiantes (LP)	2017–18	Primera División	0	0	0	0	—		0	0	0	0	0	0
Estudiantes (LP)	Total		6	0	0	0	—		2	0	0	0	8	0
Aldosivi (loan)	2016	Primera División	3	0	1	0	—		—		0	0	4	0
Chacarita Juniors (loan)	2016–17	Primera B Nacional	0	0	0	0	—		—		0	0	0	0
Estudiantes (BA) (loan)	2016–17	Primera B Metropolitana	4	1	0	0	—		—		0	0	4	1
Estudiantes (BA) (loan)	2017–18	Primera B Metropolitana	6	0	0	0	—		—		0	0	6	0
Estudiantes (BA) (loan)	Total		10	1	0	0	—		—		0	0	10	1
Career total			63	8	5	3	—		2	0	0	0	70	11

== Personal life ==
He is the brother of fellow footballer Federico Rosso.
