= Matías Medina =

Argentine footballer

Personal information
- Full name: Matías Ezequiel Medina
- Date of birth: 11 April 1998 (age 28)
- Place of birth: Munro, Argentina
- Height: 1.70 m (5 ft 7 in)
- Position: Attacking midfielder

Team information
- Current team: 9 Julio Chacab

Youth career
- CEFAR
- 2011–2016: Chacarita Juniors

Senior career*
Years	Team	Apps	(Gls)
2016–2020	Chacarita Juniors	0	(0)
2018–2019	→ Deportivo Armenio (loan)	6	(0)
2020–	9 Julio Chacab		
- * Club domestic league appearances and goals

Matías Ezequiel Medina (born 11 April 1998) is an Argentine professional footballer who plays as an attacking midfielder for 9 Julio Chacab.

== Club career ==
Medina had a youth spell with CEFAR, before joining Chacarita Juniors at the age of thirteen. Five years after joining, Medina was called up for the first-team after being an unused substitute for a Primera B Nacional match with Instituto on 27 August 2016. Almost a year later, in July 2017, he made his professional debut in a Copa Argentina loss to Guillermo Brown. On 2 August 2018, Deportivo Armenio signed Medina on loan. He made six appearances in Primera C Metropolitana as they secured promotion to Primera B Metropolitana.

Medina returned to Characarita in June 2019, remaining until January 2020 when he would terminate his contract. A move to 9 Julio Chacab soon followed.

== International career ==
He received a call-up for the Argentina U17 team in October 2014.

== Career statistics ==
As of 17 October 2020.

Club statistics
Club	Season	League			Cup		League Cup		Continental		Other		Total	
Club	Season	Division	Apps	Goals	Apps	Goals	Apps	Goals	Apps	Goals	Apps	Goals	Apps	Goals
Chacarita Juniors	2016–17	Primera B Nacional	0	0	1	0	—		—		0	0	1	0
Chacarita Juniors	2017–18	Primera División	0	0	0	0	—		—		0	0	0	0
Chacarita Juniors	2018–19	Primera B Nacional	0	0	0	0	—		—		0	0	0	0
Chacarita Juniors	2019–20	Primera B Nacional	0	0	0	0	—		—		0	0	0	0
Chacarita Juniors	Total		0	0	1	0	—		—		0	0	1	0
Deportivo Armenio (loan)	2018–19	Primera C Metropolitana	6	0	0	0	—		—		0	0	6	0
Career total			6	0	1	0	—		—		0	0	7	0
