= Maximiliano Casa =

Argentine footballer (born 1993)

Personal information
- Date of birth: 18 February 1993 (age 33)
- Place of birth: Villa Constitución, Argentina
- Position: Forward

Team information
- Current team: Gimnasia Jujuy

Senior career*
Years	Team	Apps	(Gls)
2013–2014	Lanús	0	(0)
2013–2014	→ Flandria (loan)	27	(0)
2014	San Jorge	8	(0)
2015–2019	Chacarita Juniors	52	(7)
2017–2019	→ Atlético de Rafaela (loan)	25	(7)
2020	Atenas	0	(0)
2020–2021	Central Norte	6	(1)
2021	JJ Urquiza		
2021	Club Sportivo Ben Hur		
2022	Estudiantes de San Luis	33	(12)
2023	Club Atlético Güemes	34	(4)
2024–2025	San Martín de San Juan	41	(7)
2025–	Gimnasia Jujuy	24	(2)
- * Club domestic league appearances and goals as of 17:33, 28 April 2026 (UTC)

Maximiliano Casa (born 18 February 1993) is an Argentine professional footballer who plays as a forward for Gimnasia Jujuy.

== Career ==
Casa's first club were Lanús, with whom he didn't make a senior appearance for but did spend a season out on loan with Flandria of Primera B Metropolitana in 2013–14. He played twenty-seven times for the club as they were relegated to Primera C. He left Lanús permanently in 2014 to sign for Torneo Federal B's San Jorge, who he went onto play eight times for. In January 2015, Casa joined Primera B Nacional side Chacarita Juniors. He made his debut for Chacarita on 24 March versus Ferro Carril Oeste prior to scoring his first senior goal three appearances later against Independiente Rivadavia on 27 September.

After seven matches in 2015, Casa featured forty-four times and scored six goals in the following two seasons of 2016 and 2016–17; the latter ended with promotion to the Argentine Primera División. On 10 August 2017, Casa was loaned out to Atlético de Rafaela of Primera B Nacional. His 100th career appearance arrived in February 2018 against Ferro Carril Oeste. On 13 February 2020, Uruguayan Segunda División side Atenas announced the signing of Casa. He wouldn't play competitively due to the COVID-19 pandemic, but did appear in friendlies before returning to his homeland with Central Norte.

== Career statistics ==
As of 27 October 2020.

Club statistics
Club	Season	League			Cup		League Cup		Continental		Other		Total	
Club	Season	Division	Apps	Goals	Apps	Goals	Apps	Goals	Apps	Goals	Apps	Goals	Apps	Goals
Lanús	2013–14	Primera División	0	0	0	0	—		0	0	0	0	0	0
Flandria (loan)	2013–14	Primera B Metropolitana	27	0	1	0	—		—		0	0	28	0
San Jorge	2014	Torneo Federal B	8	0	0	0	—		—		0	0	8	0
Chacarita Juniors	2015	Primera B Nacional	7	1	1	0	—		—		0	0	8	1
Chacarita Juniors	2016	Primera B Nacional	18	5	0	0	—		—		0	0	18	5
Chacarita Juniors	2016–17	Primera B Nacional	26	1	0	0	—		—		0	0	26	1
Chacarita Juniors	2017–18	Primera División	0	0	0	0	—		—		0	0	0	0
Chacarita Juniors	2018–19	Primera B Nacional	0	0	0	0	—		—		0	0	0	0
Chacarita Juniors	2019–20	Primera B Nacional	1	0	0	0	—		—		0	0	1	0
Chacarita Juniors	Total		52	7	1	0	—		—		0	0	53	7
Atlético de Rafaela (loan)	2017–18	Primera B Nacional	18	6	1	0	—		—		1 (Note: Appearance(s) in the Primera B Nacional play-offs)	0	20	6
Atlético de Rafaela (loan)	2018–19	Primera B Nacional	7	1	2	0	—		—		0	0	9	1
Atlético de Rafaela (loan)	Total		25	7	3	0	—		—		1	0	29	7
Atenas	2020	Segunda División	0	0	—		—		—		0	0	0	0
Central Norte	2020–21	Torneo Federal A	0	0	0	0	—		—		0	0	0	0
Career total			112	14	5	0	—		0	0	1	0	118	14
