= Nahuel Menéndez =

Argentine footballer

Personal information
- Full name: Nahuel Raúl Menéndez
- Date of birth: 5 March 1994 (age 32)
- Place of birth: Buenos Aires, Argentina
- Height: 1.65 m (5 ft 5 in)
- Position: Right-back

Team information
- Current team: Alvarado

Youth career
- Chacarita Juniors
- 2012–2013: Sevilla

Senior career*
Years	Team	Apps	(Gls)
2013–2015	Sevilla B	37	(0)
2015–2019	Chacarita Juniors	88	(4)
2019–2020	San Martín T.	1	(0)
2020–2021	Agropecuario	9	(0)
2022–	Alvarado	15	(0)
- * Club domestic league appearances and goals as of 18:28, 14 June 2022 (UTC)

Nahuel Raúl Menéndez (born 5 March 1994) is an Argentine professional footballer who plays as a right-back for Alvarado.

== Career ==
Menéndez spent time in the system of Chacarita Juniors, prior to departing in 2012 to join Sevilla of La Liga. Firstly with the youth team, then with reserve team Sevilla B. He made his debut on 17 February in a Segunda División B win over San Roque. Seven appearances came in 2012–13, while twenty-nine came in 2013–14 and one in 2014–15. In January 2015, Menéndez rejoined Chacarita Juniors. He made his debut for the club on 25 July versus Gimnasia y Esgrima in Primera B Nacional. After fourteen matches in 2015, he went onto score two goals in forty-six appearances in 2016 and 2016–17; the latter ended with promotion.

On 4 January 2019, Menéndez terminated his contract with Chacarita with them back in the second tier. He subsequently joined Primera División side San Martín. In October 2020 Menéndez joined Agropecuario. At the end of December 2021, Menéndez signed with Primera Nacional side Alvarado.

== Personal life ==
Nahuel is the twin brother of fellow footballer Jonathan Menéndez.

== Career statistics ==
As of 10 January 2019.

Club statistics
Club	Season	League			Cup		Continental		Other		Total	
Club	Season	Division	Apps	Goals	Apps	Goals	Apps	Goals	Apps	Goals	Apps	Goals
Sevilla B	2012–13	Segunda División B	7	0	—		—		0	0	7	0
Sevilla B	2013–14	Segunda División B	29	0	—		—		0	0	29	0
Sevilla B	2014–15	Segunda División B	1	0	—		—		0	0	1	0
Sevilla B	Total		37	0	—		—		0	0	37	0
Chacarita Juniors	2015	Primera B Nacional	10	0	4	0	—		0	0	14	0
Chacarita Juniors	2016	Primera B Nacional	12	1	0	0	—		0	0	12	1
Chacarita Juniors	2016–17	Primera B Nacional	34	1	0	0	—		0	0	34	1
Chacarita Juniors	2017–18	Primera División	21	2	1	0	—		0	0	22	2
Chacarita Juniors	2018–19	Primera B Nacional	11	0	0	0	—		0	0	11	0
Chacarita Juniors	Total		88	4	5	0	—		0	0	93	4
San Martín	2018–19	Primera División	0	0	0	0	—		0	0	0	0
Career total			125	4	5	0	—		0	0	130	4
