= Club Atlético Alvarado =

Argentine football club

Alvarado
- Full name: Club Atlético Alvarado
- Nicknames: Torito; Matadero; Alva
- Founded: 21 June 1928; 97 years ago
- Ground: Estadio José María Minella, Mar del Plata; Buenos Aires Province
- Capacity: 35,354
- Chairman: Emiliano Montes
- Manager: Marcelo Vázquez
- League: Torneo Federal A
- 2025: Primera Nacional Zone A, 18th of 18 (relegated)
- Website: www.clubalvarado.com.ar
Home colours	Away colours

Club Atlético Alvarado is an Argentine football club from the city of Mar del Plata, Buenos Aires Province. The team currently plays in the Primera B Nacional, the 2nd division of the Argentine football league system.

The club has played at the highest level of Argentine football on only one occasion, more specifically in the 1978 Campeonato Nacional, which coincided with the 50th anniversary of its foundation. Alvarado participated in Group D of that tournament, finishing 7th of 8 teams. The team's most notable results that year were two 1–1 draws with Quilmes, the 1978 Metropolitano champion, a 4–4 draw with Atlanta and a great 5–0 victory over San Lorenzo.

In May 1992 Alvarado reached the Torneo Argentino A finals, only to lose the chance of promotion to the Primera B Nacional to Arsenal de Sarandí. At the end of the 2008–09 season the club was relegated from Torneo Argentino B after losing its playoff games at the hands of Crucero del Norte. Alvarado returned to the Torneo Argentino A in June 2012, after defeating Deportivo Roca by penalties in the playoffs.

== Current squad ==
As of 14 June 2022

Note: Flags indicate national team as defined under FIFA eligibility rules; some limited exceptions apply. Players may hold more than one non-FIFA nationality.

No.	Pos.	Nation	Player
—	GK	ARG	Pedro Fernández
—	GK	ARG	Esteban Ruiz
—	GK	ARG	Agustin Zapata
—	DF	ARG	Agustín Irazoque
—	DF	ARG	Franco Ledesma
—	DF	ARG	Franco Malagueño
—	DF	ARG	Francisco Mattia
—	DF	ARG	Nahuel Menéndez
—	DF	ARG	Brian Mieres
—	DF	ARG	Alan Robledo
—	DF	ARG	Rodrigo Sequeira
—	DF	ARG	Fabián Sánchez (loan from Racing Club)
—	MF	ARG	Santiago González

No.	Pos.	Nation	Player
—	MF	ARG	Gonzalo Lamardo
—	MF	ARG	Ivan Molinas
—	MF	ARG	Matías Rodríguez
—	MF	ARG	Julián Vitale
—	FW	ARG	Leandro Vella
—	FW	ARG	Agustín Araujo
—	FW	ARG	Ariel Chávez
—	FW	ARG	Marcos Astina
—	FW	ARG	Facundo Pons
—	FW	ARG	Victorio Ramis
—	FW	COL	Jorge Luis Ramos
—	FW	ARG	Nazareno Solís (loan from Boca Juniors)
—	FW	ARG	Mauro Valiente (on loan from Talleres)

=== Out on loan ===
Note: Flags indicate national team as defined under FIFA eligibility rules; some limited exceptions apply. Players may hold more than one non-FIFA nationality.

No.	Pos.	Nation	Player
—	MF	ARG	Sebastián Jaurena (at Unión de Santa Fe until 31 December 2022)
—	FW	ARG	Robertino Giacomini (at Sacachispas until 31 December 2022)

== Honours ==
=== National ===
- Torneo Argentino B
  - Winners (1): 2011–12

=== Regional ===
- Primera División de la Liga Marplatense de fútbol
  - Winners (5): 1977, 1990, 1992, 1997, 2012
- Segunda División de la Liga Marplatense de fútbol
  - Winners (1): 1964
- Torneo de la Liga Marplatense de Barrios
  - Winners (4): 1950, 1951, 1952, 1953
- Torneo Classificatorio a regionales
  - Winners (3): 1990, 1998, 2000
