= Estadio de Chacarita Juniors =

Football stadium in Villa Maipú, Argentina

Chacarita Juniors Stadium
- Estadio de Chacarita Juniors

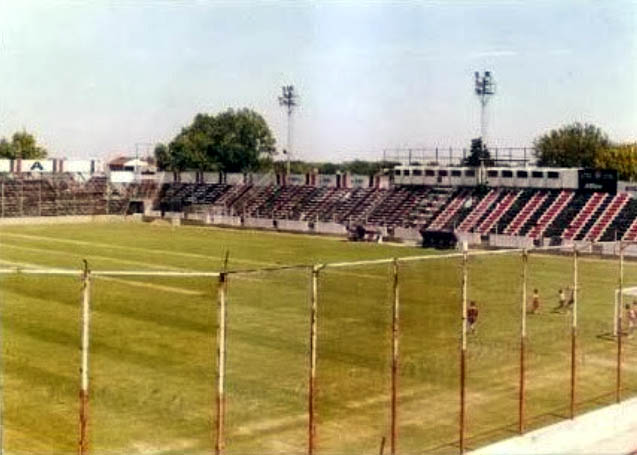
- View of the stadium in 1990
- Interactive map of Chacarita Juniors Stadium
- Address: Gutiérrez 351; Villa Maipú; Argentina
- Coordinates: 34.5674°S 58.5282°W
- Owner: Chacarita Juniors
- Capacity: 13,600
- Surface: Grass

Construction
- Opened: 8 July 1945; 81 years ago
- Rebuilt: 2011
- Cost: m$n320,000
- Architects: José Ripolli; Sergio Albarracín (2011)

Tenant
- Chacarita Juniors (1945–present)

The Estadio de Chacarita Juniors is a stadium located in the Villa Maipú district of General San Martín Partido, Argentina. Inaugurated in 1945 and then demolished and rebuilt in 2011, it is the home venue of Chacarita Juniors.

== History ==
The first stadium of Chacarita Juniors was located in Villa Crespo, Buenos Aires, on a land bounded by Humboldt, Padilla, Darwin, and Murillo streets. The first match was played in April 1925. The club stayed there until 1931, when they leave the field to build another stadium in a land next to it. Chacarita inaugurated the stadium in 1933, which had four grandstands and a capacity for 35,000 people. In 1935, the club installed a lighting system composed of four towers. Chacarita played in that stadium until 1943, when the club was evicted when the land was acquired by a company.

After the eviction, Chacarita looked for a land where to build a new stadium in the General San Martín Partido of Greater Buenos Aires, distant 8 km from the city of Buenos Aires. The stadium was built in less than six months at a cost of m$n320,000.

The stadium was inaugurated on July 8, 1945, with a friendly match between Chacarita and Uruguayan club River Plate, won by the local team 1–0.

In 2005, a report commissioned by the club determined that the stadium did not meet the minimum security conditions. As a result, the club closed the stadium to demolish the grandstands and to build new structures. Its capacity was for 18,000 people. The refurbished venue was reopened on January 30, 2011, when Chacarita played a friendly game vs Argentinos Juniors, with an attendance of 20,000. Previously, Chacarita had played their home games at several stadiums such as Almagro, Argentinos Juniors, and Ferro Carril Oeste.

The Governor of Buenos Aires Province, Daniel Scioli, was the most notable presence in the event and was the person who cut the ribbon to declare the stadium officially reopened. This act was made in front of the Isaac López stand, named as a tribute to the legendary goalkeeper who played the most games for Chacarita (343 matches, from 1937 to 1952).

It is expected that future works allow the stadium to increase its capacity to 30,000 spectators.
