= Fernando Evangelista =

Argentine footballer (born 1991)

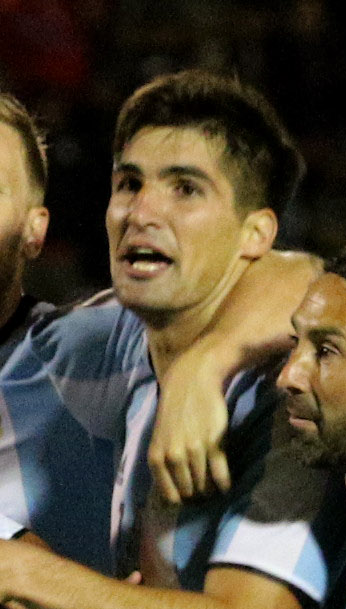

Personal information
- Full name: Fernando Evangelista Iglesias
- Date of birth: 21 October 1991 (age 35)
- Place of birth: Santa Rosa, Argentina
- Height: 1.83 m (6 ft 0 in)
- Position: Left-back

Team information
- Current team: Patronato

Youth career
- Deportivo MacAllister
- 2005–2012: Boca Juniors

Senior career*
Years	Team	Apps	(Gls)
2012–2017	Boca Juniors	3	(0)
2013–2014	→ Unión Santa Fe (loan)	25	(0)
2014–2017	→ Tucumán (loan)	55	(0)
2018	Newell's Old Boys	9	(0)
2018–2019	Estudiantes	5	(0)
2019–2020	Aldosivi	8	(0)
2020–2022	Estudiantes BA	39	(1)
2022–2023	Quilmes	22	(1)
2023	Deportivo Municipal	16	(0)
2023–2024	Cienciano	18	(1)
2024–2025	Atlanta	25	(1)
2025–2026	Flandria	20	(0)
2026–	Patronato	4	(0)
- * Club domestic league appearances and goals as of 17:38, 23 March 2026 (UTC)

Fernando Evangelista Iglesias (born 21 October 1991) is an Argentine professional footballer who plays as a left-back for Patronato.

== Career ==
Evangelista started in the youth ranks of Deportivo MacAllister, before joining Boca Juniors at the age of fourteen. After seven years in the youth of Boca, Evangelista made his professional debut on 25 August 2012 in an Argentine Primera División match against Unión Santa Fe. Another appearance for Boca came against Colón on 11 November. Ahead of the 2013–14 Primera B Nacional season, Evangelista joined Unión Santa Fe on loan for the season. He went onto make twenty-five appearances for Unión. In July 2014, Evangelista joined Primera B Nacional side Atlético Tucumán in a two-season loan deal.

He made his debut for the club on 10 August 2014 in a 1–0 win against Crucero del Norte. He played twenty-seven times for Atlético Tucumán during the 2014 and 2015 Primera B Nacional seasons, fifteen of those games came during Atlético Tucumán's promotion-winning campaign of 2015. On 6 January 2016, Evangelista extended his loan spell with Atlético Tucumán for a further eighteen months until the end of the 2016–17 Argentine Primera División season. He returned to Boca for the 2017–18 campaign and featured twice before leaving the club to join Newell's Old Boys. Eleven total appearances followed for them.

On 5 July 2018, Evangelista was signed by Estudiantes. He appeared six times for the La Plata outfit, the last of which came on 3 March 2019 versus Racing Club. In the succeeding June, Evangelista agreed to join fellow Primera División team Aldosivi. He then had a spell at Estudiantes de Buenos Aires, before joining Quilmes in January 2022.

== Career statistics ==
As of 15 June 2019.

Club statistics
Club	Season	League			Cup		League Cup		Continental		Other		Total	
Club	Season	Division	Apps	Goals	Apps	Goals	Apps	Goals	Apps	Goals	Apps	Goals	Apps	Goals
Boca Juniors	2012–13	Primera División	2	0	0	0	—		0	0	0	0	2	0
Boca Juniors	2013–14	Primera División	0	0	0	0	—		0	0	0	0	0	0
Boca Juniors	2014	Primera División	0	0	0	0	—		0	0	0	0	0	0
Boca Juniors	2015	Primera División	0	0	0	0	—		0	0	0	0	0	0
Boca Juniors	2016	Primera División	0	0	0	0	—		0	0	0	0	0	0
Boca Juniors	2016–17	Primera División	0	0	0	0	—		0	0	0	0	0	0
Boca Juniors	2017–18	Primera División	1	0	1	0	—		0	0	0	0	2	0
Boca Juniors	Total		3	0	1	0	—		0	0	0	0	4	0
Unión Santa Fe (loan)	2013–14	Primera B Nacional	25	0	0	0	—		—		0	0	25	0
Atlético Tucumán (loan)	2014	Primera B Nacional	12	0	0	0	—		—		0	0	12	0
Atlético Tucumán (loan)	2015	Primera B Nacional	15	0	0	0	—		—		0	0	15	0
Atlético Tucumán (loan)	2016	Primera División	8	0	0	0	—		—		0	0	8	0
Atlético Tucumán (loan)	2016–17	Primera División	20	0	1	0	—		10 (Note: Appearance(s) in the Copa Libertadores)	0	0	0	31	0
Atlético Tucumán (loan)	Total		55	0	1	0	—		10	0	0	0	66	0
Newell's Old Boys	2017–18	Primera División	9	0	1	0	—		1 (Note: Appearance(s) in the Copa Sudamericana)	0	0	0	11	0
Estudiantes	2018–19	Primera División	5	0	1	0	—		0	0	0	0	6	0
Career total			97	0	4	0	—		11	0	0	0	113	0

== Honours ==
Atlético Tucumán

- Primera B Nacional: 2015
