= Lucas Álvarez =

Argentine footballer

Personal information
- Full name: Lucas Emanuel Álvarez
- Date of birth: 9 March 1994 (age 32)
- Place of birth: San Martín, Argentina
- Height: 1.84 m (6 ft 1/2 in)
- Position: Goalkeeper

Team information
- Current team: Atlas

Senior career*
Years	Team	Apps	(Gls)
2015–2019	Chacarita Juniors	1	(0)
2019–2021	Acassuso	0	(0)
2022	Douglas Haig	0	(0)
2023-	Atlas	3	(0)
- * Club domestic league appearances and goals as of 16:19, 3 April 2019 (UTC)

Lucas Emanuel Álvarez (born 9 March 1994) is an Argentine professional footballer who plays as a goalkeeper for Atlas.

== Career ==
Álvarez first appeared in the Chacarita Juniors first-team in 2015 when he was an unused substitute for a Copa Argentina match against Atlas in April 2015. He wasn't involved again until the 2016–17 campaign, which was a season spent on the bench as he was unused twenty-five times as Chacarita won promotion to the 2017–18 Primera División. However, Álvarez did make his professional debut towards the end of that season in the Copa Argentina. He played the full ninety minutes as the club were knocked out by Guillermo Brown in the round of sixty-four on 5 July 2017. His league debut arrived on 11 May 2018 versus San Martín.

In January 2019, Álvarez moved to Primera B Metropolitana with Acassuso.

== Career statistics ==
As of 3 April 2019.

Club statistics
Club	Season	League			Cup		Continental		Other		Total	
Club	Season	Division	Apps	Goals	Apps	Goals	Apps	Goals	Apps	Goals	Apps	Goals
Chacarita Juniors	2015	Primera B Nacional	0	0	0	0	—		0	0	0	0
Chacarita Juniors	2016	Primera B Nacional	0	0	0	0	—		0	0	0	0
Chacarita Juniors	2016–17	Primera B Nacional	0	0	1	0	—		0	0	1	0
Chacarita Juniors	2017–18	Primera División	1	0	0	0	—		0	0	1	0
Chacarita Juniors	2018–19	Primera B Nacional	0	0	0	0	—		0	0	0	0
Chacarita Juniors	Total		1	0	1	0	—		0	0	2	0
Acassuso	2018–19	Primera B Metropolitana	0	0	0	0	—		0	0	0	0
Career total			1	0	1	0	—		0	0	2	0
