= Juan Imbert =

Argentine footballer (born 1990)

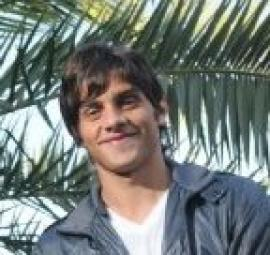

Personal information
- Full name: Juan Martín Imbert
- Date of birth: 31 March 1990 (age 36)
- Place of birth: San Miguel de Tucumán, Argentina
- Height: 1.70 m (5 ft 7 in)
- Position: Forward

Team information
- Current team: San Martín Tucumán

Youth career
- La Florida
- 2009–2010: Boca Juniors

Senior career*
Years	Team	Apps	(Gls)
2010–2016	Boca Juniors	2	(0)
2013–2014	→ Aldosivi (loan)	37	(3)
2014–2015	→ Atlético Tucumán (loan)	42	(1)
2016	Guaraní Antonio Franco	8	(0)
2016–2017	Arsenal de Sarandí	10	(0)
2017–2018	Chacarita Juniors	22	(2)
2018–2019	Quilmes	36	(1)
2020–	San Martín Tucumán	56	(7)
- * Club domestic league appearances and goals as of 16:16, 31 July 2022 (UTC)

Juan Martín Imbert (born 31 March 1990) is an Argentine professional footballer who plays as a forward for San Martín de Tucumán.

== Career ==
Imbert's youth career began with La Florida, prior to joining Boca Juniors's youth ranks. He played in five of the club's six matches in the 2011 U-20 Copa Libertadores as they finished as runners-up. Imbert featured on Boca's first-team bench three times during the 2010–11 season. He subsequently made his Boca Juniors senior debut in August 2012 in an Argentine Primera División match with Lanús. He had to wait six months until his next senior appearance for Boca, before departing the team to join Primera B Nacional side Aldosivi on loan. Three goals in thirty-eight matches followed before he returned to his parent club.

In the next season, 2014, he completed a loan move to second-tier side Atlético Tucumán. He went onto make forty-two league appearances and scored once across the 2014 and 2015 campaigns. He left Boca Juniors in 2016 to join Guaraní Antonio Franco of Torneo Federal A. He participated in eight fixtures, but didn't score, during the 2016 season. Ahead of 2016–17, Imbert completed a move to Argentine Primera División club Arsenal de Sarandí. His Arsenal debut came on 18 September against Temperley. Imbert joined newly promoted Primera División team Chacarita Juniors on 11 August 2017.

He made his Chacarita debut on 10 September in a league match with Tigre. Quilmes signed Imbert in July 2018.

== Career statistics ==
As of 9 September 2018.

Club statistics
Club	Season	League			Cup (Note: Includes the Copa Argentina)		League Cup		Continental (Note: Includes the Copa Sudamericana)		Other		Total	
Club	Season	Division	Apps	Goals	Apps	Goals	Apps	Goals	Apps	Goals	Apps	Goals	Apps	Goals
Boca Juniors	2010–11	Primera División	0	0	0	0	—		0	0	0	0	0	0
Boca Juniors	2011–12	Primera División	0	0	0	0	—		0	0	0	0	0	0
Boca Juniors	2012–13	Primera División	2	0	0	0	—		0	0	0	0	2	0
Boca Juniors	2013–14	Primera División	0	0	0	0	—		0	0	0	0	0	0
Boca Juniors	2014	Primera División	0	0	0	0	—		0	0	0	0	0	0
Boca Juniors	2015	Primera División	0	0	0	0	—		0	0	0	0	0	0
Boca Juniors	Total		2	0	0	0	—		0	0	0	0	2	0
Aldosivi (loan)	2013–14	Primera B Nacional	37	3	1	0	—		—		0	0	38	3
Atlético Tucumán (loan)	2014	Primera B Nacional	15	0	0	0	—		—		0	0	15	0
Atlético Tucumán (loan)	2015	Primera B Nacional	27	1	1	0	—		—		0	0	28	1
Atlético Tucumán (loan)	Total		42	1	1	0	—		—		0	0	43	1
Guaraní Antonio Franco	2016	Torneo Federal A	8	0	0	0	—		—		0	0	8	0
Arsenal de Sarandí	2016–17	Primera División	10	0	1	0	—		2 (Note: Two appearances in 2017 Copa Sudamericana)	0	0	0	13	0
Chacarita Juniors	2017–18	Primera División	22	2	0	0	—		—		0	0	22	2
Quilmes	2018–19	Primera B Nacional	2	0	0	0	—		—		0	0	2	0
Career total			123	6	3	0	—		2	0	0	0	128	6

== Honours ==
Atlético Tucumán

- Primera B Nacional: 2015
