= Ariel Chávez =

Argentine footballer

Ariel Cháves
Personal information
- Full name: Ariel Hernán Cháves
- Date of birth: 20 February 1992 (age 34)
- Place of birth: Buenos Aires, Argentina
- Height: 1.79 m (5 ft 10 in)
- Position: Left winger

Team information
- Current team: Almagro

Youth career
- Almagro

Senior career*
Years	Team	Apps	(Gls)
2013–2018	Almagro	117	(7)
2018–2019	Colón	1	(0)
2019–2020	Guayaquil City	50	(2)
2021	San Martín T.	27	(0)
2022	Alvarado	25	(1)
2023	Flandria	17	(1)
2024	Gimnasia y Tiro	27	(1)
2025–	Almagro	6	(0)
- * Club domestic league appearances and goals as of 16:11, 29 June 2025 (UTC)

Ariel Hernán Cháves (born 20 February 1992) is an Argentine professional footballer who plays as a left winger for Almagro.

== Career ==
Chávez's senior career began in 2013 with Almagro of Primera B Metropolitana. He participated in fifty-four fixtures and scored three goals across his first three seasons, including one in twenty-five fixtures during 2015 as Almagro won promotion to Primera B Nacional. Chávez scored his first goal at tier two level on 11 July 2017 during a 2–0 victory over Brown. He departed them a year later, leaving after seven goals in one hundred and twenty-seven matches in all competitions. Chávez joined Argentine Primera División side Colón in August 2018. His only appearance for the club came versus Independiente on 15 September, which they lost 3–0.

In January 2019, Chávez completed a move to Ecuadorian Serie A team Guayaquil City. He left the club at the end of 2020. In March 2021, Chávez returned to his homeland and joined San Martín de Tucumán. Ahead of the 2022 season, Chávez moved to fellow league club Alvarado.

== Career statistics ==
As of 6 January 2019.

Club statistics
Club	Season	League			Cup		League Cup		Continental		Other		Total
Club	Season	Division	Apps	Goals	Apps	Goals	Apps	Goals	Apps	Goals	Apps	Goals	
Almagro	2013–14	Primera B Metropolitana	12	1	0	0	—		0	0	12	1	
Almagro	2014	Primera B Metropolitana	17	1	0	0	—		0	0	17	1	
Almagro	2015	Primera B Metropolitana	21	1	1	0	—		3 (Note: Appearance(s) in the Primera B Metropolitana play-offs)	0	25	1	
Almagro	2016	Primera B Nacional	14	0	1	0	—		0	0	15	0	
Almagro	2016–17	Primera B Nacional	32	1	3	0	—		0	0	35	1	
Almagro	2017–18	Primera B Nacional	21	3	0	0	—		2 (Note: Appearance(s) in the Primera B Nacional play-offs)	0	23	3	
Almagro	Total		117	7	5	0	—		5	0	127	7	
Colón	2018–19	Primera División	1	0	0	0	0	0	0	0	1	0	
Guayaquil City	2019	Serie A	0	0	—		—		0	0	0	0	
Career total			118	7	0	0	0	0	5	0	123	7	
