= Federico Rosso =

Argentine footballer

Personal information
- Full name: Federico Guillermo Rosso
- Date of birth: 1 July 1987 (age 39)
- Place of birth: Rosario, Argentina
- Height: 1.85 m (6 ft 1 in)
- Position: Centre-back

Team information
- Current team: Chacarita Juniors

Youth career
- Chacarita Juniors

Senior career*
Years	Team	Apps	(Gls)
2008–2010	Chacarita Juniors	0	(0)
2008–2009	→ Central Córdoba SdE (loan)	5	(0)
2011	CAI	17	(0)
2011–2012	Sportivo Desamparados	25	(1)
2012–2013	Brescia	3	(0)
2013–2015	Crucero del Norte	49	(0)
2016–2018	Chacarita Juniors	73	(4)
2018–2021	Agropecuario	60	(1)
2022–	Chacarita Juniors	9	(1)
- * Club domestic league appearances and goals as of 16:02, 11 July 2022 (UTC)

Federico Guillermo Rosso (born 1 July 1987) is an Argentine professional footballer who plays as a centre-back for Chacarita Juniors.

== Career ==
Rosso's career began in 2008 with Primera B Nacional side Chacarita Juniors, however before featuring for the club he was loaned out to Central Córdoba of Torneo Argentino A. Five appearances followed. In August 2010, Rosso was an unused substitute three times for Chacarita in league matches against Tiro Federal, Unión Santa Fe and Gimnasia y Esgrima. 2011 saw him leave Chacarita permanently to join CAI, prior to subsequently moving to Sportivo Desamparados. He made seventeen and twenty-five appearances for those clubs respectively, both seasons ended with relegation.

In July 2012, Rosso left Argentine football to join Brescia of Italy's Serie B. He made his Brescia debut on 25 August, he was subbed on in stoppage time as Brescia lost to Crotone 1–0. He would only make two further appearances in 2012–13, both as a late substitute. Rosso departed Brescia a year after joining in July 2013 after just three appearances, none of which were starts or home games. He returned to Argentina to sign for Crucero del Norte in Primera B Nacional. He went onto make thirty-seven appearances in two seasons with Crucero, twelve came during the club's promotion-winning campaign of 2014.

He made another twelve appearances in the Argentine Primera División with Crucero, but dropped down a division in 2016 to rejoin former club Chacarita Juniors. Forty-nine matches later, Rosso was back in the Primera División after Chacarita were promoted in 2016–17. In the top-flight, Rosso scored three goals in his first ten matches; including two versus Lanús on 11 December 2017. On 30 June 2018, Rosso joined Agropecuario of Primera B Nacional. Ahead of the 2022 season, Rosso returned to his former club, Chacarita Juniors.

== Personal life ==
He is the brother of fellow footballer Matías Rosso.

== Career statistics ==
As of 11 September 2018.

Club statistics
Club	Season	League			Cup (Note: Includes the Copa Argentina and Coppa Italia)		League Cup		Continental		Other		Total	
Club	Season	Division	Apps	Goals	Apps	Goals	Apps	Goals	Apps	Goals	Apps	Goals	Apps	Goals
Chacarita Juniors	2008–09	Primera B Nacional	0	0	0	0	—		—		0	0	0	0
Chacarita Juniors	2009–10	Primera División	0	0	0	0	—		—		0	0	0	0
Chacarita Juniors	2010–11	Primera B Nacional	0	0	0	0	—		—		0	0	0	0
Chacarita Juniors	Total		0	0	0	0	—		—		0	0	0	0
Central Córdoba (loan)	2008–09	Torneo Argentino A	5	0	0	0	—		—		0	0	5	0
CAI	2010–11	Primera B Nacional	17	0	0	0	—		—		0	0	17	0
CAI	Total		17	0	0	0	—		—		0	0	17	0
Sportivo Desamparados	2011–12	Primera B Nacional	25	1	1	0	—		—		0	0	26	1
Brescia	2012–13	Serie B	3	0	0	0	—		—		0	0	3	0
Crucero del Norte	2013–14	Primera B Nacional	25	0	2	0	—		—		0	0	27	0
Crucero del Norte	2014	Primera B Nacional	12	0	0	0	—		—		0	0	12	0
Crucero del Norte	2015	Primera División	12	0	0	0	—		—		0	0	12	0
Crucero del Norte	Total		49	0	2	0	—		—		0	0	51	0
Chacarita Juniors	2016	Primera B Nacional	17	0	0	0	—		—		0	0	17	0
Chacarita Juniors	2016–17	Primera B Nacional	32	0	0	0	—		—		0	0	32	0
Chacarita Juniors	2017–18	Primera División	24	4	1	0	—		—		0	0	25	4
Chacarita Juniors	Total		73	4	1	0	—		—		0	0	74	4
Agropecuario	2018–19	Primera B Nacional	2	0	1	0	—		—		0	0	3	0
Career total			174	5	5	0	—		—		0	0	179	5
