= Agustín Heredia =

Argentine footballer

Personal information
- Full name: Gastón Agustín Heredia
- Date of birth: 16 June 1997 (age 29)
- Place of birth: Mendiolaza, Argentina
- Height: 1.92 m (6 ft 4 in)
- Position: Centre-back

Team information
- Current team: Boca Juniors

Youth career
- 2005–2010: Quilmes Villa Allende
- 2010–2015: CD Atalaya
- 2015–2018: Boca Juniors

Senior career*
Years	Team	Apps	(Gls)
2018–	Boca Juniors	2	(0)
2019	→ Godoy Cruz (loan)	2	(0)
2019–2021	→ Cerro Largo (loan)	55	(3)
2022	→ Plaza Colonia (loan)	28	(0)
2023–2024	→ San Martín SJ (loan)	17	(0)
2025	→ Cobreloa (loan)	22	(1)
- * Club domestic league appearances and goals as of 14 December 2025

Gastón Agustín Heredia (born 16 June 1997) is an Argentine professional footballer who plays as a centre-back for Boca Juniors.

== Club career ==
Heredia begun playing football at the age of 8 with his local club Quilmes de Villa Allende, where he played as a striker. He moved to the youth academy of Club Deportivo Atalaya and after spending 5 years there, transferred to Boca Juniors in 2015.

Heredia made his professional debut for Boca Juniors in a 3-2 Torneos de Verano loss to Godoy Cruz on 15 January 2018. He debuted in the Copa Libertadores in a 0–0 tie against Alianza Lima on 1 March 2018. Heredia made his Argentine Primera División for Boca Juniors in a 2–0 loss to Argentinos Juniors on 18 March 2018.

In March 2025, Heredia moved to Chile and joined on loan to Cobreloa.

== International career ==
Heredia was called up to the Argentina U20s for a training camp in October 2016.
