= Villa Maipú =

- Location in Greater Buenos Aires
- Coordinates: 34°34′S 58°32′W
- Country: Argentina
- Province: Buenos Aires
- Partido: General San Martín
- Elevation: 28 m (92 ft)

Population (2001 census [INDEC])
  - Total: 24,447
- CPA Base: B 1650
- Area code: +54 11

Villa Maipú is a localidad (district) of the General San Martín Partido in Buenos Aires Province, Argentina. It forms part of the urban agglomeration of Greater Buenos Aires.

The localidad is home to Chacarita Juniors, a football club that won the 1969 Metropolitano.
