= Lautaro Montoya =

Argentine footballer

Personal information
- Date of birth: 7 October 1994 (age 32)
- Place of birth: Villa Ballester, Argentina
- Height: 1.70 m (5 ft 7 in)
- Position: Left-back

Team information
- Current team: Gimnasia y Tiro (on loan from Estudiantes BA)

Youth career
- San Lorenzo

Senior career*
| Years | Team | Apps | (Gls) |
| 2016–2019 | San Lorenzo | 7 | (0) |
| 2017 | → Chacarita Juniors (loan) | 4 | (0) |
| 2019– | Estudiantes BA | 25 | (1) |
| 2021–2022 | → Sarmiento (loan) | 29 | (1) |
| 2022 | → Central Córdoba SdE (loan) | 12 | (0) |
| 2023 | → Tigre (loan) | 15 | (0) |
| 2024–2025 | → Central Córdoba SdE (loan) | 2 | (0) |
| 2025– | → Gimnasia y Tiro (loan) | 22 | (1) |
- * Club domestic league appearances and goals as of 18:01, 28 April 2026 (UTC)

Lautaro Montoya (born 7 October 1994) is an Argentine footballer who plays for Gimnasia y Tiro, on loan from Estudiantes BA as a left-back.
