= 2007–08 Torneo Argentino A =

XIII Torneo Argentino A
- Season: 2007–08
- Champions: Atlético Tucumán (1st divisional title)
- Promoted: Atlético Tucumán
- Relegated: La Florida; Sportivo Patria; La Plata; Luján de Cuyo
- Top goalscorer: Claudio Sarría (21 goals)

The 2007–08 Argentine Torneo Argentino A was the thirteenth season of third division professional football in Argentina. A total of 25 teams competed; the champion was promoted to Primera B Nacional.

== Club information ==
=== Zone A ===
Club	City	Stadium
Atlético Tucumán	Tucumán	Monumental José Fierro
Desamparados	San Juan	El Serpentario
Gimnasia y Esgrima	Mendoza	Víctor Antonio Legrotaglie
Juventud Antoniana	Salta	Fray Honorato Pistoia
Juventud Unida Universitario	San Luis	Mario Diez
La Florida	La Florida	Capitán Jaime Solá
Luján de Cuyo	Luján de Cuyo	Jardín del Bajo
Talleres	Perico	Plinio Zabala

=== Zone B ===
Club	City	Stadium
9 de Julio	Rafaela	El Coloso
Alumni	Villa María	Manuel Ocampo
Boca Unidos	Corrientes	José Antonio Romero Feris
Gimnasia y Esgrima	Concepción del Uruguay	Manuel y Ramón Núñez
Libertad	Sunchales	Hogar de Los Tigres
Racing	Córdoba	Miguel Sancho
Sportivo Patria	Formosa	Antonio Romero
Unión	Sunchales	La Fortaleza

=== Zone C ===
Club	City	Stadium
Cipolletti	Cipolletti	La Visera de Cemento
Guillermo Brown	Puerto Madryn	Raul Conti
Huracán	Tres Arroyos	Roberto Lorenzo Bottino
Juventud	Pergamino	José Raymundi
La Plata	La Plata	Gobernador Mercante
Real Arroyo Seco	Arroyo Seco	Arroyo Seco
Rivadavia	Lincoln	El Coliseo
Santamarina	Tandil	Municipal Gral. San Martín
Villa Mitre	Bahía Blanca	El Fortín

== First stage ==
As Zone 3 had 9 teams and Zones 1 and 2 8 teams, each team of Zone 1 played against 1 team of Zone 2 to complete the fixture.

=== Zone A ===
Pos	Team	Pld	W	D	L	GF	GA	GD	Pts	Qualification or relegation
1	Atlético Tucumán	32	21	5	6	65	26	+39	68	Final Stage
2	Desamparados	32	17	7	8	54	41	+13	58	Final Stage
3	Talleres (P)	32	15	10	7	40	31	+9	55	Final Stage
4	Juventud Unida Universitario	32	16	6	10	48	34	+14	54	
5	Juventud Antoniana	32	11	5	16	46	51	−5	38	
6	Gimnasia y Esgrima (Mza)	32	7	12	13	28	37	−9	33	
7	Luján de Cuyo	32	7	7	18	28	57	−29	28	Relegation Playoff
8	La Florida	32	5	8	19	29	60	−31	23	Torneo Argentino B

=== Zone B ===
Pos	Team	Pld	W	D	L	GF	GA	GD	Pts	Qualification or relegation
1	Racing (C)	32	20	9	3	56	20	+36	69	Final Stage
2	Unión (S)	32	16	11	5	51	29	+22	59	Final Stage
3	Libertad (S)	32	14	11	7	46	31	+15	53	Final Stage
4	Gimnasia y Esgrima (CdU)	32	12	6	14	33	43	−10	42	
5	Boca Unidos	32	11	6	15	44	43	+1	39	
6	Alumni (VM)	32	8	8	16	31	46	−15	32	
7	9 de Julio (R) (Note: 6 points deducted because of match fixing scandal in 2006–07 Torneo Argentino A.)	32	9	9	14	37	46	−9	30	
8	Sportivo Patria	32	2	10	20	30	71	−41	16	Torneo Argentino B

=== Zone C ===
Pos	Team	Pld	W	D	L	GF	GA	GD	Pts	Qualification
1	Santamarina	32	14	13	5	41	31	+10	55	Final Stage
2	Cipolletti	32	14	12	6	51	37	+14	54	Final Stage
3	Juventud (P)	32	12	9	11	50	45	+5	45	
4	Guillermo Brown	32	10	12	10	38	37	+1	42	
5	Rivadavia (L)	32	11	9	12	40	43	−3	42	
6	Huracán (TA)	32	10	11	11	37	35	+2	41	
7	Real Arroyo Seco	32	11	8	13	46	48	−2	41	
8	Villa Mitre	32	9	10	13	43	46	−3	37	
9	La Plata	32	6	10	16	25	49	−24	28	Relegation Playoff

== Final stage ==
=== Group A ===
Pos	Team	Pld	W	D	L	GF	GA	GD	Pts	Qualification
1	Racing (C)	6	4	2	0	7	0	+7	14	Final
2	Desamparados	6	3	0	3	4	6	−2	9	
3	Santamarina	6	1	2	3	5	8	−3	5	
4	Libertad (S)	6	1	2	3	6	8	−2	5	

=== Group B ===
Pos	Team	Pld	W	D	L	GF	GA	GD	Pts	Qualification
1	Atlético Tucumán	6	5	0	1	11	5	+6	15	Final
2	Cipolletti	6	4	0	2	12	9	+3	12	
3	Talleres (P)	6	2	0	4	6	9	−3	6	
4	Unión (S)	6	1	0	5	11	17	−6	3	

== Championship final ==
Team 1	Agg.	Team 2	1st leg	2nd leg
Atlético Tucumán	3–3 (4–2 p)	Racing (C)	1–2	2–1

== Promotion/relegation playoff B Nacional-Torneo Argentino A ==
Team 1	Agg.	Team 2	1st leg	2nd leg
Talleres (C)	3–2	Racing (C)	2–1	1–1

- Talleres (C) remained in the Primera B Nacional by winning the playoff.

== Relegation playoff ==
Team 1	Agg.	Team 2	1st leg	2nd leg
Relegation/promotion playoff 1
Alvarado	4–3	La Plata	3–1	1–2
Relegation/promotion playoff 2
Central Córdoba (SdE)	5–1	Luján de Cuyo	4–0	1–1

- Alvarado was promoted to 2008–09 Torneo Argentino A by winning the playoff and Alvarado was relegated to 2008–09 Torneo Argentino B.
- Central Córdoba (SdE) was promoted to 2008–09 Torneo Argentino A by winning the playoff and Luján de Cuyo was relegated to 2008–09 Torneo Argentino B.

== See also ==
- 2007–08 in Argentine football
