= 2005–06 Torneo Argentino A =

Association football tournament in Argentina

XI Torneo Argentino A
- Season: 2005–06
- Champions: Villa Mitre (1st divisional title)
- Promoted: Villa Mitre; San Martín (T)
- Relegated: Ñuñorco; Huracán (CR); Cipolletti; Racing (O); Atlético Candelaria; General Paz Juniors
- Top goalscorer: Adrían Aranda (21 goals)

The 2005–06 Argentine Torneo Argentino A was the eleventh season of third division professional football in Argentina. A total of 24 teams competed; the champion was promoted to Primera B Nacional.

== Club information ==
=== Zone A ===
Club	City	Stadium
Cipolletti	Cipolletti	La Visera de Cemento
Desamparados	San Juan	El Serpentario
Douglas Haig	Pergamino	Miguel Morales
Guillermo Brown	Puerto Madryn	Raul Conti
Huracán	Comodoro Rivadavia	César Muñoz
Independiente Rivadavia	Mendoza	Bautista Gargantini
Juventud	Pergamino	José Raymundi
Juventud Unida Universitario	San Luis	Mario Diez
La Plata	La Plata	Gobernador Mercante
Luján de Cuyo	Luján de Cuyo	Jardín del Bajo
Racing	Olavarría	José Buglione
Villa Mitre	Bahía Blanca	El Fortín

=== Zone B ===
Club	City	Stadium
9 de Julio	Rafaela	El Coloso
Atlético Candelaria	Candelaria	Anastacio Cabrera
Atlético Tucumán	Tucumán	Monumental José Fierro
General Paz Juniors	Córdoba	General Paz Juniors
Gimnasia y Esgrima	Concepción del Uruguay	Manuel y Ramón Núñez
La Florida	La Florida	Capitán Jaime Solá
Ñuñorco	Monteros	Ñuñorco
Racing	Córdoba	Miguel Sancho
San Martín	San Miguel de Tucumán	La Ciudadela
Sportivo Patria	Formosa	Antonio Romero
Talleres	Perico	Plinio Zabala
Unión	Sunchales	La Fortaleza

== Apertura 2005 ==
=== First stage ===
==== Zone A ====
Pos	Team	Pld	W	D	L	GF	GA	GD	Pts	Qualification
1	Douglas Haig	11	6	3	2	18	15	+3	21	Final Stage
2	Villa Mitre	11	6	2	3	15	11	+4	20	Final Stage
3	La Plata	11	6	2	3	15	8	+7	20	Final Stage
4	Guillermo Brown	11	5	3	3	18	11	+7	18	Final Stage
5	Independiente Rivadavia	11	4	5	2	12	10	+2	17	Final Stage
6	Desamparados	11	5	1	5	9	13	−4	16	Final Stage
7	Cipolletti	11	4	2	5	19	17	+2	14 (Note: Tiebreaker: Head-to-head match and not goal difference.)	Final Stage
8	Juventud (P)	11	4	2	5	15	17	−2	14	Final Stage
9	Luján de Cuyo	11	3	5	3	18	15	+3	14	
10	Racing (O)	11	3	2	6	8	15	−7	11	
11	Juventud Unida Universitario	11	1	5	5	12	18	−6	8	
12	Huracán (CR)	11	1	4	6	8	17	−9	7	

==== Zone B ====
Pos	Team	Pld	W	D	L	GF	GA	GD	Pts	Qualification
1	San Martín (T)	11	5	5	1	14	6	+8	20	Final Stage
2	Atlético Tucumán	11	6	1	4	21	14	+7	19	Final Stage
3	Sportivo Patria	11	5	3	3	14	13	+1	18	Final Stage
4	Unión (S)	11	5	2	4	18	19	−1	17	Final Stage
5	Talleres (P)	11	4	4	3	11	11	0	16	Final Stage
6	Atlético Candelaria	11	4	3	4	13	14	−1	15	Final Stage
7	General Paz Juniors	11	4	2	5	17	21	−4	14	Final Stage
8	Racing (C)	11	3	5	3	8	8	0	14	Final Stage
9	La Florida	11	3	4	4	13	15	−2	13	
10	Ñuñorco	11	3	4	4	9	11	−2	13	
11	9 de Julio (R)	11	2	4	5	12	13	−1	10	
12	Gimnasia y Esgrima (CdU)	11	3	1	7	12	17	−5	10	

=== Final stage ===
Round of 16
A1	Douglas Haig^{1}	1	0	1
A8	Juventud (P)	0	1	1
A3	La Plata	0	3	3
A6	Desamparados	1	5	6
B1	San Martín (T)	2	3	5
B8	Racing (C)	0	2	2
B2	Atlético Tucumán	1	1	2
B7	General Paz Juniors	3	0	3
A2	Villa Mitre	1	2	3
A7	Cipolletti	2	0	2
A4	Guillermo Brown	0	5	5
A5	Independiente Rivadavia	0	2	2
B3	Sportivo Patria	1	5	6
B6	Atlético Candelaria	2	1	3
B4	Unión (S)	0	1	1
B5	Talleres (P)	3	1	4

Quarterfinals
A1	Douglas Haig^{1}	0	2	2
A6	Desamparados	2	0	2
B1	San Martín (T)	0	1	1
B7	General Paz Juniors	1	1	2
A2	Villa Mitre^{1}	1	3	4
A4	Guillermo Brown	3	1	4
B3	Sportivo Patria	1	3	4
B5	Talleres (P)	1	1	2

Semifinals
A1	Douglas Haig	2	1	3(6)
B7	General Paz Juniors (p)	0	3	3(7)
A2	Villa Mitre	5	3	8
B3	Sportivo Patria	1	0	1

Finals
A2	Villa Mitre (p)	0	1	1(9)
B7	General Paz Juniors	1	0	1(8)

1: Qualified because of sport advantage.

- Note: The team in the first line plays at home the second leg.

== Clausura 2006 ==
=== First stage ===
==== Zone A ====
Pos	Team	Pld	W	D	L	GF	GA	GD	Pts	Qualification
1	Guillermo Brown	11	7	2	2	19	11	+8	23	Final Stage
2	Juventud Unida Universitario	11	6	2	3	17	13	+4	20	Final Stage
3	Desamparados	11	5	3	3	18	16	+2	18	Final Stage
4	Douglas Haig	11	5	3	3	27	16	+11	18	Final Stage
5	La Plata	11	4	5	2	16	10	+6	17	Final Stage
6	Villa Mitre	11	4	4	3	19	18	+1	16	Final Stage
7	Independiente Rivadavia	11	3	5	3	16	17	−1	14	Final Stage
8	Juventud (P)	11	3	3	5	15	17	−2	12	Final Stage
9	Racing (O)	11	3	3	5	13	17	−4	12	
10	Luján de Cuyo	11	2	5	4	11	14	−3	11	
11	Huracán (CR)	11	3	1	7	7	21	−14	10	
12	Cipolletti	11	2	2	7	18	26	−8	8	

==== Zone B ====
Pos	Team	Pld	W	D	L	GF	GA	GD	Pts	Qualification
1	Atlético Tucumán	11	7	2	2	18	10	+8	23	Final Stage
2	Racing (C)	11	7	1	3	21	16	+5	22	Final Stage
3	San Martín (T)	11	6	2	3	23	15	+8	20	Final Stage
4	9 de Julio (R)	11	5	4	2	27	19	+8	19	Final Stage
5	Unión (S)	11	5	4	2	21	13	+8	19	Final Stage
6	Talleres (P)	11	4	3	4	14	18	−4	15	Final Stage
7	La Florida	11	4	3	4	6	11	−5	15 (Note: The match played between them in Round 10 was originally 2-2, but it was awarded 0-1 loss to both.)	Final Stage
8	Gimnasia y Esgrima (CdU)	11	4	1	6	17	21	−4	13 (Note: Didn't qualify for the Final Stage as it was involved in Relegation Playoff Qualifying.)	
9	Sportivo Patria	11	3	3	5	18	21	−3	12	Final Stage
10	Atlético Candelaria	11	2	3	6	21	23	−2	9	
11	General Paz Juniors	11	2	3	6	14	24	−10	9	
12	Ñuñorco	11	0	3	8	10	21	−11	3	

=== Final stage ===
Round of 16
A1	Guillermo Brown	0	3	3
A8	Juventud (P)	0	2	2
A2	Juventud Unida Universitario	2	2	4
A7	Independiente Rivadavia	3	2	5
B3	San Martín (T)	3	1	4
B7	La Florida	0	0	0
B4	9 de Julio (R)^{1}	2	2	4
B5	Unión (S)	3	1	4
B2	Racing (C)	1	3	4
B6	Talleres (P)	2	1	3
B1	Atlético Tucumán	0	1	1
B8	Sportivo Patria	1	4	5
A3	Desamparados	2	2	4
A6	Villa Mitre	1	2	3
A4	Douglas Haig	3	3	6
A5	La Plata	2	1	3

Quarterfinals
A1	Guillermo Brown	0	4	4
A7	Independiente Rivadavia	2	1	3
B3	San Martín (T)	0	4	4
B4	9 de Julio (R)	0	1	1
B2	Racing (C)^{1}	0	1	1
B8	Sportivo Patria	0	1	1
A3	Desamparados	1	3	4
A4	Douglas Haig	1	1	2

Semifinals
A1	Guillermo Brown	0	2	2
B3	San Martín (T)	3	2	5
B2	Racing (C)	1	1	2
A3	Desamparados	0	1	1

Finals
B2	Racing (C)	1	2	3(6)
B3	San Martín (T) (p)	2	1	3(7)

1: Qualified because of sport advantage.

- Note: The team in the first line plays at home the second leg.

== Overall standings ==
=== Zone A ===
Pos	Team	Pld	W	D	L	GF	GA	GD	Pts	Qualification or relegation
1	Guillermo Brown	22	12	5	5	37	22	+15	41	
2	Douglas Haig	22	11	6	5	45	31	+14	39	
3	La Plata	22	10	7	5	31	18	+13	37	
4	Villa Mitre	22	10	6	6	34	29	+5	36	
5	Desamparados	22	10	4	8	27	29	−2	34	
6	Independiente Rivadavia	22	7	10	5	28	27	+1	31	
7	Juventud Unida Universitario	22	7	7	8	29	31	−2	28	
8	Juventud (P)	22	7	5	10	30	34	−4	26	
9	Luján de Cuyo	22	5	10	7	29	29	0	25	Relegation Playoff Qualifying
10	Racing (O)	22	6	5	11	21	32	−11	23	Relegation Playoff Qualifying
11	Cipolletti	22	6	4	12	37	43	−6	22	Additional Playoff
12	Huracán (CR)	22	4	5	13	15	38	−23	17	Torneo Argentino B

=== Zone B ===
Pos	Team	Pld	W	D	L	GF	GA	GD	Pts	Qualification or relegation
1	Atlético Tucumán	22	13	3	6	39	24	+15	42	
2	San Martín (T)	22	11	7	4	37	21	+16	40	
3	Unión (S)	22	10	6	6	39	32	+7	36	
4	Racing (C)	22	10	6	6	29	24	+5	36	
5	Talleres (P)	22	8	7	7	25	29	−4	31	
6	Sportivo Patria	22	8	6	8	32	34	−2	30	
7	9 de Julio (R)	22	7	8	7	39	32	+7	29	
8	La Florida	22	7	7	8	19	26	−7	28	
9	Atlético Candelaria	22	6	6	10	34	37	−3	24	Relegation Playoff Qualifying
10	Gimnasia y Esgrima (CdU)	22	7	2	13	29	38	−9	23	Relegation Playoff Qualifying
11	General Paz Juniors	22	6	5	11	31	45	−14	23	Additional Playoff
12	Ñuñorco	22	3	7	12	19	32	−13	16	Torneo Argentino B

== Championship final ==
Team 1	Agg.	Team 2	1st leg	2nd leg
San Martín (T)	3–3 (3–4 p)	Villa Mitre	2–2	1–1

== Promotion/relegation playoff B Nacional-Torneo Argentino A ==
Team 1	Agg.	Team 2	1st leg	2nd leg
San Martín (M)	0–1	San Martín (T)	0–1	0–0

- San Martín (T) was promoted to 2006–07 Primera B Nacional by winning the playoff and San Martin (T) was relegated to 2006–07 Torneo Argentino A.

== Relegation playoff Qualifying ==
Team 1	Agg.	Team 2	1st leg	2nd leg
Luján de Cuyo	4–1	Racing (O)	0–1	4–0

- Lujan de Cuyo remains in Torneo Argentino A and Racing (O) played the Relegation Playoff.

Team 1	Agg.	Team 2	1st leg	2nd leg
Atlético Candelaria	3–5	Gimnasia y Esgrima (CdU)	0–2	3–3

- Gimnasia y Esgrima (CdU) remains in Torneo Argentino A and Atlético Candelaria played the Relegation Playoff.

== Additional Playoff ==
Team 1	Agg.	Team 2	1st leg	2nd leg
General Paz Juniors	2–2 (3–2 p)	Cipolletti	1–2	1–0

- General Paz Juniors plays the Relegation Playoff and Cipolletti was relegated to 2006–07 Torneo Argentino B.

== Relegation playoff ==
Team 1	Agg.	Team 2	1st leg	2nd leg
Relegation/promotion playoff 1
Rivadavia (L)	2–1	Racing (O)	1–0	1–1
Relegation/promotion playoff 2
Real Arroyo Seco	4–2	Atlético Candelaria	4–0	0–2
Relegation/promotion playoff 3
Alumni (VM)	5–2	General Paz Juniors	5–0	0–2

- Rivadavia (L) was promoted to 2006–07 Torneo Argentino A by winning the playoff and Racing (O) was relegated to 2006–07 Torneo Argentino B.
- Real Arroyo Seco was promoted to 2006–07 Torneo Argentino A by winning the playoff and Atlético Candelaria was relegated to 2006–07 Torneo Argentino B.
- Alumni (VM) was promoted to 2006–07 Torneo Argentino A by winning the playoff and General Paz Juniors was relegated to 2006–07 Torneo Argentino B.

== See also ==
- 2005–06 in Argentine football
