= 2006–07 Torneo Argentino A =

XII Torneo Argentino A
- Season: 2006–07
- Champions: Independiente Rivadavia (2nd divisional title)
- Promoted: Independiente Rivadavia
- Relegated: Central Norte; San Martín (M); Douglas Haig
- Top goalscorer: Gustavo Rivadeneira (14 goals)

The 2006–07 Argentine Torneo Argentino A was the twelfth season of third division professional football in Argentina. A total of 24 teams competed; the champion was promoted to Primera B Nacional.

== Club information ==
=== Zone A ===
Club	City	Stadium
Douglas Haig	Pergamino	Miguel Morales
Gimnasia y Esgrima	Concepción del Uruguay	Manuel y Ramón Núñez
Guillermo Brown	Puerto Madryn	Raul Conti
Juventud	Pergamino	José Raymundi
La Plata	La Plata	Gobernador Mercante
Real Arroyo Seco	Arroyo Seco	Arroyo Seco
Rivadavia	Lincoln	El Coliseo
Santamarina	Tandil	Municipal Gral. San Martín

=== Zone B ===
Club	City	Stadium
Alumni	Villa María	Manuel Ocampo
Desamparados	San Juan	El Serpentario
Gimnasia y Esgrima	Mendoza	Víctor Antonio Legrotaglie
Independiente Rivadavia	Mendoza	Bautista Gargantini
Juventud Unida Universitario	San Luis	Mario Diez
Luján de Cuyo	Luján de Cuyo	Jardín del Bajo
Racing	Córdoba	Miguel Sancho
San Martín	Mendoza	San Martín

=== Zone C ===
Club	City	Stadium
9 de Julio	Rafaela	El Coloso
Atlético Tucumán	Tucumán	Monumental José Fierro
Central Norte	Salta	Luis Güemes
Juventud Antoniana	Salta	Fray Honorato Pistoia
La Florida	La Florida	Capitán Jaime Solá
Sportivo Patria	Formosa	Antonio Romero
Talleres	Perico	Plinio Zabala
Unión	Sunchales	La Fortaleza

== Apertura 2006 ==
=== Zone A ===
Pos	Team	Pld	W	D	L	GF	GA	GD	Pts	Qualification
1	Guillermo Brown	14	9	1	4	31	20	+11	28	Final Stage
2	Gimnasia y Esgrima (CdU)	14	7	2	5	22	23	−1	23	Final Stage
3	Santamarina	14	6	4	4	14	9	+5	22	Final Stage
4	Rivadavia (L)	14	6	3	5	22	16	+6	21	
5	Real Arroyo Seco	14	5	5	4	19	17	+2	20	
6	Douglas Haig	14	4	5	5	14	16	−2	17	
7	Juventud (P)	14	5	1	8	16	21	−5	16	
8	La Plata	14	2	3	9	8	24	−16	9	

=== Zone B ===
Pos	Team	Pld	W	D	L	GF	GA	GD	Pts	Qualification
1	Independiente Rivadavia	14	8	4	2	16	11	+5	28	Final Stage
2	Desamparados	14	6	6	2	19	13	+6	24	Final Stage
3	Alumni (VM)	14	6	4	4	15	16	−1	22	Final Stage
4	San Martín (M)	14	6	4	4	13	11	+2	22	
5	Luján de Cuyo	14	4	3	7	14	14	0	15	
6	Juventud Unida Universitario	14	3	6	5	15	19	−4	15	
7	Gimnasia y Esgrima (Mza)	14	2	7	5	17	17	0	13	
8	Racing (C)	14	2	4	8	14	22	−8	10	

=== Zone C ===
Pos	Team	Pld	W	D	L	GF	GA	GD	Pts	Qualification
1	Sportivo Patria	14	9	2	3	19	14	+5	29	Final Stage
2	Juventud Antoniana	14	6	3	5	17	14	+3	21	Final Stage
3	Unión (S)	14	6	2	6	16	16	0	20	
4	Talleres (P)	14	6	2	6	16	16	0	20	
5	La Florida	14	6	1	7	14	18	−4	19	
6	Atlético Tucumán	14	5	3	6	17	18	−1	18	
7	9 de Julio (R)	14	5	3	6	15	16	−1	18	
8	Central Norte	14	4	2	8	16	18	−2	14	

== Final stage ==
Quarterfinals
1	Sportivo Patria	1	1	2(1)
8	Alumni (VM) (p)	0	2	2(3)
4	Desamparados	2	1	3
5	Gimnasia y Esgrima (CdU)	2	0	2
3	Independiente Rivadavia	0	4	4(2)
6	Juventud Antoniana (p)	3	1	4(4)
2	Guillermo Brown	0	1	1
7	Santamarina	1	1	2

Semifinals
4	Desamparados	1	2	3
8	Alumni (VM)	1	0	1
6	Juventud Antoniana	1	1	2
7	Santamarina	2	3	5

Final
4	Desamparados (p)	0	3	3(2)
7	Santamarina	2	1	3(1)

- Note: The team in the first line plays at home the second leg.

== Clausura 2007 ==
=== Zone A ===
Pos	Team	Pld	W	D	L	GF	GA	GD	Pts	Qualification
1	La Plata	14	7	4	3	23	17	+6	25	Final Stage
2	Rivadavia (L)	14	6	4	4	18	16	+2	22	Final Stage
3	Guillermo Brown	14	6	4	4	19	17	+2	22	Final Stage
4	Santamarina	14	6	3	5	21	18	+3	21	
5	Gimnasia y Esgrima (CdU)	14	5	5	4	19	18	+1	20	
6	Real Arroyo Seco	14	4	4	6	12	17	−5	16	
7	Juventud (P)	14	4	3	7	13	14	−1	15	
8	Douglas Haig	14	3	3	8	10	18	−8	12	

=== Zone B ===
Pos	Team	Pld	W	D	L	GF	GA	GD	Pts	Qualification
1	Racing (C)	14	8	3	3	21	14	+7	27	Final Stage
2	Independiente Rivadavia	14	7	5	2	22	15	+7	26	Final Stage
3	Juventud Unida Universitario	14	6	3	5	18	18	0	21	
4	Luján de Cuyo	14	6	3	5	19	20	−1	21	
5	Alumni (VM)	14	5	3	6	19	21	−2	18	
6	Gimnasia y Esgrima (Mza)	14	5	1	8	15	17	−2	16	
7	San Martín (M) (Note: The match played between them in Round 14 was originally 0-0, but it was awarded 0-1 loss to both; each team has 9 points deducted in the aggregate table because of match fixing scandal.)	14	3	4	7	11	16	−5	13	
8	Desamparados	14	4	0	10	11	17	−6	12	

=== Zone C ===
Pos	Team	Pld	W	D	L	GF	GA	GD	Pts	Qualification
1	Atlético Tucumán	14	8	4	2	25	12	+13	28	Final Stage
2	Unión (S)	14	8	2	4	19	15	+4	26	Final Stage
3	Juventud Antoniana	14	7	3	4	21	20	+1	24	Final Stage
4	9 de Julio (R) (Note: The match played between them in Round 14 was originally 1-1, but it was awarded 0-1 loss to both; both teams have 6 points deducted in the 2007–08 Torneo Argentino A because of match fixing scandal. (Central Norte was relegated so the 6 points were deducted in the 2007–08 Torneo Argentino B))	14	7	2	5	27	19	+8	23	
5	La Florida	14	4	3	7	17	18	−1	15	
6	Central Norte	14	3	5	6	11	14	−3	14	
7	Talleres (P)	14	3	3	8	14	27	−13	12	
8	Sportivo Patria	14	3	2	9	13	24	−11	11	

== Final stage ==
Quarterfinals
1	Atlético Tucumán	0	4	4
8	Guillermo Brown	4	1	5
2	Racing (C)	1	3	4
7	Juventud Antoniana	0	1	1
3	La Plata	1	1	2
6	Rivadavia (L)	3	0	3
4	Independiente Rivadavia	1	1	2
5	Unión (S)	1	0	1

Semifinals
2	Racing (C)	1	1	2
8	Guillermo Brown	3	3	6
4	Independiente Rivadavia	0	1	1
6	Rivadavia (L)	1	1	2

Final
6	Rivadavia (L)	0	1	1
8	Guillermo Brown	2	2	4

- Note: The team in the first line plays at home the second leg.

== Overall standings ==
=== Zone A ===
Pos	Team	Pld	W	D	L	GF	GA	GD	Pts	Qualification or relegation
1	Guillermo Brown	28	15	5	8	50	37	+13	50	
2	Rivadavia (L)	28	12	7	9	40	32	+8	43	
3	Santamarina	28	12	7	9	35	27	+8	43	
4	Gimnasia y Esgrima (CdU)	28	12	7	9	41	41	0	43	
5	Real Arroyo Seco	28	9	9	10	31	34	−3	36	
6	La Plata	28	9	7	12	31	41	−10	34	
7	Juventud (P)	28	9	4	15	29	35	−6	31	Relegation Playoff
8	Douglas Haig	28	7	8	13	24	34	−10	29	Torneo Argentino B

=== Zone B ===
Pos	Team	Pld	W	D	L	GF	GA	GD	Pts	Qualification or relegation
1	Independiente Rivadavia	28	15	9	4	38	26	+12	54	
2	Alumni (VM)	28	11	7	10	34	37	−3	40	
3	Racing (C)	28	10	7	11	35	36	−1	37	
4	Luján de Cuyo	28	10	6	12	33	34	−1	36	
5	Juventud Unida Universitario	28	9	9	10	33	37	−4	36	
6	Gimnasia y Esgrima (Mza)	28	7	8	13	32	34	−2	29	
7	Desamparados (Note: Both teams have 9 points deducted in the aggregate table because of match fixing scandal)	28	10	6	12	30	30	0	27	Relegation Playoff
8	San Martín (M)	28	9	8	11	24	27	−3	26	Torneo Argentino B

=== Zone C ===
Pos	Team	Pld	W	D	L	GF	GA	GD	Pts	Qualification or relegation
1	Atlético Tucumán	28	13	7	8	42	30	+12	46	
2	Unión (S)	28	14	4	10	35	31	+4	46	
3	Juventud Antoniana	28	13	6	9	38	34	+4	45	
4	9 de Julio (R) (Note: Both teams have 6 points deducted in the 2007–08 Torneo Argentino A because of match fixing scandal. (Central Norte was relegated so the 6 points were deducted in the 2007–08 Torneo Argentino B))	28	12	5	11	42	35	+7	41	
5	Sportivo Patria	28	12	4	12	32	38	−6	40	
6	La Florida	28	10	4	14	31	36	−5	34	
7	Talleres (P)	28	9	5	14	30	43	−13	32	Relegation Playoff
8	Central Norte	28	7	7	14	27	32	−5	28	Torneo Argentino B

== Championship final ==
The Final was played between the Apertura winners, Desamparados and clausura winners, Guillermo Brown. But as Desamparados had to play the Relegation Playoff, so Independiente Rivadavia, as best team in the overall standings took their place.

Team 1	Agg.	Team 2	1st leg	2nd leg
Independiente Rivadavia	2–2 (3–2 p)	Guillermo Brown	0–1	2–1

== Promotion/relegation playoff B Nacional-Torneo Argentino A ==
Team 1	Agg.	Team 2	1st leg	2nd leg
Ben Hur	4–0	Guillermo Brown	1–0	3–0

- Ben Hur remained in the Primera B Nacional by winning the playoff.

== Relegation playoff ==
Team 1	Agg.	Team 2	1st leg	2nd leg
Relegation/promotion playoff 1
Racing (O)	1–3	Juventud (P)	1–1	0–2
Relegation/promotion playoff 2
Central Córdoba (SdE)	1–2	Talleres (P)	0–1	1–1
Relegation/promotion playoff 3
Deportivo Maipú	2–2	Desamparados	0–0	2–2

- Juventud (P) remained in the Torneo Argentino A by winning the playoff.
- Talleres (P) remained in the Torneo Argentino A by winning the playoff.
- Desamparados remained in the Torneo Argentino A after a 2-2 aggregate tie by virtue of a "sports advantage". In case of a tie in goals, the team from the Torneo Argentino A gets to stay in it.

== Match Fixing Scandal ==
This season was marred by two match-fixing scandals, which altered the normal course of the competition.

The first involved Central Norte and 9 de Julio (R), they had to play in the round 14 of Torneo Clausura 2007. Central Norte was already relegated to the Torneo Argentino B because of the victory of Talleres (P) and gives intentionally a penalty to 9 de Julio (R) in the last moments of the match, allowing them to qualify for the Final Stage and avoiding in the same way the qualification of Juventud Antoniana, the city rival of Central Norte. The match finished 0-1 because of the penalty, but after this, in the TV it was found that both managers were talking in the middle of the match. The Consejo Federal decided to give the match as a defeat for both teams 0-1, replaced Juventud Antoniana for 9 de Julio (R) in the Final Stage, suspended both managers and the Referee and deducted 6 points to both teams (Central Norte and 9 de Julio (R)) for the next season.

3 days after, in a match between Desamparados and San Martín (M) something similar happened. For Desamparados, Champion of Torneo Apertura, a defeat meant, due to their very bad performance in the Torneo Clausura, that they had to play the Relegation Playoff, losing the possibility of playing to get promoted to Primera B Nacional, and Independiente Rivadavia would take their place (cty rival of San Martín (M)). San Martin (M), meanwhile, with a draw avoided the Relegation Playoff, so the draw benefited both teams: Desamparados would avoid the Relegation Playoff and would play the Final to get promoted, and San Martín would avoid also the Relegation Playoff and would prevent their city rival, Independiente Rivadavia to play the Final to get Promoted. The most disadvantaged was Juventud Unida Universitario because they had to play the Relegation Playoff. The match ended 0-0. Days after Juventud Unida Universitario filed a complaint and a video showing that a player from San Martín (M) was admitting that Desamparados offered them an incentive of $30.000. The Consejo Federal decided to give the match as a defeat for both teams 0-1 and deducted 9 points to both teams so San Martín (M) was relegated to the Torneo Argentino B and Desamparados had to play the Relegation Playoff (this benefited Gimnasia y Esgrima (Mza) and Juventud Unida Universitario, who were displaced of the last places of the table. Thus Independiente Rivadavia played the Final to get promoted.

== See also ==
- 2006–07 in Argentine football
