= 2017–18 Torneo Federal A =

V Torneo Federal A
- Season: 2017–18
- Champions: Central Córdoba (SdE) (1st divisional title)
- Promoted: Central Córdoba (SdE); Gimnasia y Esgrima (M)
- Relegated: Deportivo Mandiyú; Guaraní Antonio Franco; Gutiérrez SC; Libertad (S); Rivadavia (L); Sportivo Patria; Unión (VK); Unión Aconquija
- Matches played: 552
- Goals scored: 1,224 (2.22 per match)
- Biggest home win: Rivadavia (L) 6-0 Deportivo Madryn (October 29)
- Biggest away win: Libertad (S) 2-6 Central Córdoba (SdE) (October 8)
- Highest scoring: Libertad (S) 2-6 Central Córdoba (SdE) (October 8); Gimnasia y Tiro 3-5 Central Córdoba (SdE) (February 11)
- All statistics correct as of May 27, 2018.

The 2017–18 Argentine Torneo Federal A was the 5th season of the third tier of the Argentine football league system. The tournament is reserved for teams indirectly affiliated to the Asociación del Fútbol Argentino (AFA), while teams affiliated to AFA have to play the Primera B Metropolitana, which is the other third tier competition. The champion was promoted to Primera B Nacional. 39 teams are competing in the league, 31 returning from the 2016–17 season, 4 teams that were relegated from Primera B Nacional and 4 teams promoted from Federal B. The regular season began on September 17, 2017 and ended in May 2018.

== Format ==
=== First stage ===
The teams were divided into three zones with ten teams and one zone with nine teams (a total of 39 teams) in each zone and it was played in a round-robin tournament whereby each team played each one of the other teams two times. The teams placed 1º to 4º from each zone qualified for the Second Stage. The remaining twenty three teams qualify for the Revalida Stage.

=== Championship stages ===
==== Second stage ====
The teams were divided into two zones with eight teams each and it was played in a round-robin tournament whereby each team played each one of the other teams one time. The teams placed 1º and 2º and the best 3º team from the two zones qualified for the Third Stage or Pentagonal Final. The remaining team placed 3º qualify for the Third Phase of the Revalida Stage. The other ten teams qualify for the Second Phase of the Revalida Stage.

==== Third stage ====
The five teams that qualified for the third stage or Pentagonal Final play in a round-robin tournament whereby each team played each one of the other teams one time. The winner was declared champion and automatically promoted to the Primera B Nacional. The other four teams qualify for the Fourth Phase of the Revalida Stage.

=== Revalida Stages ===
The Revalida Stage is divided in several phases: First, the twenty three teams that did not qualify for the Championship Stages were divided into the same four zones of the First Stage and it was played in a round-robin tournament whereby each team played each one of the other teams two times. The team placed 1º of each zone qualified for the Second Phase. The second phase is played between the four teams that qualified from the First Phase and the ten teams that qualified from the Second Stage of the Championship Stage. The seven winners qualify for the Third Phase.

The Third Phase is played between the seven teams that qualified from the Second Phase and the team that qualified from the Second Stage of the Championship Stage. The four winners qualify for the Fourth Phase.

The Fourth Phase is played between the four teams that qualified from the Third Phase and the four teams that qualified from the Third Stage of the Championship Stage. The four winners qualify for the Fifth Phase. The Fifth and Sixth Phase is played between the remaining teams and aims to get the Second promotion to the Primera B Nacional.

=== Relegation ===
After the First Phase of the Revalida Stage a table was drawn up with the average of points obtained in the First Stage and the First Phase of the Revalida Stage. It is determined by dividing the points by the number of games played and the bottom team of each four zones was relegated to the Torneo Federal B. Also, another table was drawn up with the remaining teams that played the Revalida Stage and the bottom four teams were relegated to the Torneo Federal B. Giving a total of eight teams relegated.

== Club information ==
Locations of the 2017-18 season teams.
Blue: Zone A; Yellow: Zone B;
Green: Zone C; Red: Zone D.

=== Zone A ===
Team	City	Stadium
Alvarado	Mar del Plata	(None) ^{1}
Cipolletti	Cipolletti	La Visera de Cemento
Deportivo Madryn	Puerto Madryn	Coliseo del Golfo
Deportivo Roca	General Roca	Luis Maiolino
Ferro Carril Oeste	General Pico	El Coloso del Barrio Talleres
Independiente	Neuquén	José Rosas y Perito Moreno
Rivadavia	Lincoln	El Coliseo
Sansinena	General Cerri	Luis Molina
Villa Mitre	Bahía Blanca	El Fortín

^{1} Play their home games at Estadio José María Minella.

=== Zone B ===
Team	City	Stadium
Deportivo Maipú	Maipú	Higinio Sperdutti
Desamparados	San Juan	El Serpentario
Estudiantes	Río Cuarto	Ciudad de Río Cuarto
Gimnasia y Esgrima	Mendoza	Víctor Antonio Legrotaglie
Gutiérrez	General Gutiérrez	General Gutiérrez
Huracán Las Heras	Las Heras	General San Martín
Juventud Unida Universitario	San Luis	Mario Diez
San Lorenzo	Catamarca	Malvinas Argentinas
Unión	Villa Krause	12 de Octubre
Unión Aconquija	Aconquija	Municipal de Aconquija

=== Zone C ===
Team	City	Stadium
Atlético Paraná	Paraná	Pedro Mutio
Central Córdoba	Santiago del Estero	Alfredo Terrera
Defensores	Pronunciamiento	Delio Cardozo
Defensores de Belgrano	Villa Ramallo	Salomón Boeseldín
Douglas Haig	Pergamino	Miguel Morales
Gimnasia y Esgrima	Concepción del Uruguay	Manuel y Ramón Núñez
Libertad	Sunchales	Hogar de Los Tigres
Sportivo Belgrano	San Francisco	Oscar Boero
Sportivo Las Parejas	Las Parejas	Fortaleza del Lobo
Unión	Sunchales	La Fortaleza

=== Zone D ===
Team	City	Stadium
Altos Hornos Zapla	Palpalá	Emilio Fabrizzi
Chaco For Ever	Resistencia	Juan Alberto García
Crucero del Norte	Garupá	Andrés Guacurarí
Deportivo Mandiyú	Corrientes	(None) ^{1}
Gimnasia y Tiro	Salta	Gigante del Norte
Guaraní Antonio Franco	Posadas	Clemente F. de Oliveira
Juventud Antoniana	Salta	Fray Honorato Pistoia
San Jorge	San Miguel de Tucumán	Senador Luis Cruz
Sarmiento	Resistencia	Centenario
Sportivo Patria	Formosa	Antonio Romero

^{1} Play their home games at Estadio José Antonio Romero Feris.

== First stage ==
=== Zone A ===
Pos	Team	Pld	W	D	L	GF	GA	GD	Pts	Qualification
1	Alvarado	16	8	5	3	23	11	+12	29	Advance to Championship Stages and 2017–18 Copa Argentina
2	Villa Mitre	16	6	8	2	16	11	+5	26	Advance to Championship Stages and 2017–18 Copa Argentina
3	Deportivo Roca	16	7	3	6	23	21	+2	24	Advance to Championship Stages and 2017–18 Copa Argentina
4	Ferro Carril Oeste (GP)	16	6	5	5	18	17	+1	23 (Note: Ferro Carril Oeste (GP) ahead of Cipoletti on head-to-head points: Ferro Carril Oeste (GP)–Cipolletti 2–1, Cipolletti–Ferro Carril Oeste (GP) 1–1.)	Advance to Championship Stages and 2017–18 Copa Argentina
5	Cipolletti	16	6	5	5	18	16	+2	23	Advance to Reválida Stage and 2017–18 Copa Argentina
6	Independiente (N)	16	5	4	7	13	21	−8	19	Advance to Reválida Stage and 2017–18 Copa Argentina
7	Rivadavia (L)	16	4	5	7	19	16	+3	17	Advance to Reválida Stage and 2017–18 Copa Argentina
8	Sansinena	16	3	7	6	12	16	−4	16 (Note: Sansinena ahead of Deportivo Madryn on head-to-head goal difference: Sansinena–Deportivo Madryn 3–0, Deportivo Madryn–Sansinena 2–1.)	Advance to Reválida Stage and 2017–18 Copa Argentina
9	Deportivo Madryn	16	4	4	8	11	24	−13	16	Advance to Reválida Stage

Updated to match(es) played on December 11, 2017. Source: AFA
Rules for classification: 1) points; 2) Head-to-head points; 3) Head-to-head goal difference; 4) Head-to-head goals scored; 5) Head-to-head away goals; 6) goal difference; 7) goals scored; 8) away goals scored; 9) draw of lots.

==== Results ====
Home \ Away	ALV	CIP	DMA	DRO	FCO	INE	RIV	SAN	VMI
Alvarado		2–1	1–1	3–0	1–0	4–0	2–0	1–1	1–1
Cipolletti	1–0		2–1	2–1	1–1	1–1	1–1	3–0	1–2
Deportivo Madryn	1–2	1–0		2–1	0–0	0–0	1–1	2–1	1–0
Deportivo Roca	1–1	3–1	1–0		2–3	4–0	2–1	0–0	2–2
Ferro Carril Oeste (GP)	0–0	2–1	4–1	1–2		2–0	0–0	1–0	0–1
Independiente (N)	2–1	0–1	1–0	1–2	4–2		0–1	0–0	0–0
Rivadavia (L)	0–1	0–1	6–0	1–0	4–0	1–2		2–2	1–1
Sansinena	0–2	0–0	3–0	2–0	0–2	1–2	1–0		1–1
Villa Mitre	2–1	1–1	1–0	1–2	0–0	1–0	2–0	0–0	

Updated to match(es) played on unknown. Source: AFA
Legend: Blue = home team win; Yellow = draw; Red = away team win.

=== Zone B ===
Pos	Team	Pld	W	D	L	GF	GA	GD	Pts	Qualification
1	Gimnasia y Esgrima (M)	18	11	7	0	28	9	+19	40	Advance to Championship Stages and 2017–18 Copa Argentina
2	Estudiantes (RC)	18	10	3	5	27	13	+14	33	Advance to Championship Stages and 2017–18 Copa Argentina
3	Desamparados	18	8	4	6	19	11	+8	28	Advance to Championship Stages and 2017–18 Copa Argentina
4	Juventud Unida Universitario	18	6	8	4	17	16	+1	26 (Note: Juventud Unida Universitario ahead of Deportivo Maipú on head-to-head away goals: Juventud Unida Universitario–Deportivo Maipú 0–0, Deportivo Maipú–Juventud Unida Universitario 1–1.)	Advance to Championship Stages and 2017–18 Copa Argentina
5	Deportivo Maipú	18	7	5	6	23	22	+1	26	Advance to Reválida Stage and 2017–18 Copa Argentina
6	Huracán Las Heras	18	4	10	4	14	18	−4	22	Advance to Reválida Stage and 2017–18 Copa Argentina
7	San Lorenzo	18	5	5	8	12	18	−6	20	Advance to Reválida Stage and 2017–18 Copa Argentina
8	Unión (VK)	18	4	5	9	15	25	−10	17	Advance to Reválida Stage and 2017–18 Copa Argentina
9	Unión Aconquija	18	1	10	7	7	20	−13	13 (Note: Unión Aconquija ahead of Gutiérrez SC on head-to-head away goals: Unión Aconquija–Gutiérrez SC 0–0, Gutiérrez SC–Unión Aconquija 1–1.)	Advance to Reválida Stage
10	Gutiérrez SC	18	2	7	9	14	24	−10	13	Advance to Reválida Stage

Updated to match(es) played on December 11, 2017. Source: AFA
Rules for classification: 1) points; 2) Head-to-head points; 3) Head-to-head goal difference; 4) Head-to-head goals scored; 5) Head-to-head away goals; 6) goal difference; 7) goals scored; 8) away goals scored; 9) draw of lots.

==== Results ====
Home \ Away	DEM	DES	EST	GEM	GSC	HLH	JUU	SLA	UVK	UAC
Deportivo Maipú		2–1	2–1	1–2	1–1	0–0	1–1	1–0	3–0	3–1
Desamparados	1–2		1–0	0–0	0–1	2–0	3–0	2–0	3–0	1–0
Estudiantes (RC)	2–0	0–2		1–1	4–1	4–0	1–0	5–1	0–0	1–0
Gimnasia y Esgrima (M)	2–0	1–0	1–0		0–0	2–0	2–0	1–0	3–1	5–0
Gutiérrez	2–3	1–2	2–2	0–1		0–1	0–1	0–1	2–1	1–1
Huracán Las Heras	3–1	0–0	0–1	2–2	1–1		1–1	1–1	1–0	0–0
Juventud Unida Universitario	0–0	2–0	0–1	1–1	2–2	2–2		0–0	2–1	0–0
San Lorenzo	1–0	1–0	2–1	1–1	2–0	0–1	0–1		0–0	2–2
Unión (VK)	3–2	1–1	0–1	2–3	1–0	1–1	1–2	1–0		0–0
Unión Aconquija	1–1	0–0	0–2	0–0	0–0	0–0	0–2	1–0	1–2	

Updated to match(es) played on unknown. Source: AFA
Legend: Blue = home team win; Yellow = draw; Red = away team win.

=== Zone C ===
Pos	Team	Pld	W	D	L	GF	GA	GD	Pts	Qualification
1	Central Córdoba (SdE)	18	9	6	3	35	19	+16	33	Advance to Championship Stages and 2017–18 Copa Argentina
2	Sportivo Belgrano	18	7	6	5	27	23	+4	27	Advance to Championship Stages and 2017–18 Copa Argentina
3	Defensores de Belgrano (VR)	18	6	8	4	23	16	+7	26 (Note: Head-to-head: Defensores de Belgrano (VR) 12 points, +12 goal difference; Unión (S) 3 points, -5 goal difference; Douglas Haig 3 points, -7 goal difference.)	Advance to Championship Stages and 2017–18 Copa Argentina
4	Unión (S)	18	6	8	4	20	19	+1	26	Advance to Championship Stages and 2017–18 Copa Argentina
5	Douglas Haig	18	7	5	6	26	28	−2	26	Advance to Reválida Stage and 2017–18 Copa Argentina
6	Gimnasia y Esgrima (CdU)	18	7	4	7	29	24	+5	25	Advance to Reválida Stage and 2017–18 Copa Argentina
7	Sportivo Las Parejas	18	5	8	5	17	19	−2	23	Advance to Reválida Stage and 2017–18 Copa Argentina
8	Defensores (P)	18	4	10	4	20	25	−5	22	Advance to Reválida Stage and 2017–18 Copa Argentina
9	Atlético Paraná	18	3	7	8	13	20	−7	16	Advance to Reválida Stage
10	Libertad (S)	18	4	2	12	19	36	−17	14	Advance to Reválida Stage

Updated to match(es) played on December 11, 2017. Source: AFA
Rules for classification: 1) points; 2) Head-to-head points; 3) Head-to-head goal difference; 4) Head-to-head goals scored; 5) Head-to-head away goals; 6) goal difference; 7) goals scored; 8) away goals scored; 9) draw of lots.

==== Results ====
Home \ Away	APA	CCO	DPR	DEF	DOU	GYE	LIB	SPB	SLP	UNS
Atlético Paraná		1–1	1–1	0–0	1–2	0–0	1–0	2–2	1–0	1–1
Central Córdoba (SdE)	1–0		1–1	4–1	2–1	4–1	6–1	0–1	1–0	1–2
Defensores (P)	1–0	2–2		1–0	1–1	2–1	0–0	5–2	0–0	2–2
Defensores de Belgrano (VR)	2–0	0–0	1–1		5–0	2–2	1–0	0–2	1–1	3–0
Douglas Haig	2–1	1–2	1–1	0–2		1–0	2–1	4–1	2–2	3–1
Gimnasia y Esgrima (CdU)	2–1	3–0	3–0	2–2	4–3		3–1	3–1	2–0	1–1
Libertad (S)	0–1	2–6	4–0	3–1	1–2	2–1		1–1	1–3	1–0
Sportivo Belgrano	3–2	0–0	3–0	0–0	1–1	2–1	3–0		4–0	0–0
Sportivo Las Parejas	2–0	1–3	1–1	0–0	0–0	1–0	2–1	2–0		2–2
Unión (S)	0–0	1–1	2–1	0–2	2–0	1–0	3–0	2–1	0–0	

Updated to match(es) played on unknown. Source: AFA
Legend: Blue = home team win; Yellow = draw; Red = away team win.

=== Zone D ===
Pos	Team	Pld	W	D	L	GF	GA	GD	Pts	Qualification
1	Sarmiento (R)	18	10	7	1	25	13	+12	37	Advance to Championship Stages and 2017–18 Copa Argentina
2	Chaco For Ever	18	8	7	3	18	10	+8	31	Advance to Championship Stages and 2017–18 Copa Argentina
3	Gimnasia y Tiro	18	7	8	3	22	17	+5	29	Advance to Championship Stages and 2017–18 Copa Argentina
4	Crucero del Norte	18	7	7	4	25	16	+9	28	Advance to Championship Stages and 2017–18 Copa Argentina
5	Altos Hornos Zapla	18	7	6	5	14	17	−3	27	Advance to Reválida Stage and 2017–18 Copa Argentina
6	Juventud Antoniana	18	5	9	4	14	15	−1	24	Advance to Reválida Stage and 2017–18 Copa Argentina
7	San Jorge (T)	18	5	5	8	15	17	−2	20	Advance to Reválida Stage and 2017–18 Copa Argentina
8	Sportivo Patria	18	4	4	10	21	29	−8	16	Advance to Reválida Stage and 2017–18 Copa Argentina
9	Deportivo Mandiyú	18	3	6	9	14	23	−9	15	Advance to Reválida Stage
10	Guaraní Antonio Franco	18	3	3	12	17	28	−11	12	Advance to Reválida Stage

Updated to match(es) played on December 7, 2017. Source: AFA
Rules for classification: 1) points; 2) Head-to-head points; 3) Head-to-head goal difference; 4) Head-to-head goals scored; 5) Head-to-head away goals; 6) goal difference; 7) goals scored; 8) away goals scored; 9) draw of lots.

==== Results ====
Home \ Away	AHZ	CFE	CRU	DEP	GYT	GAF	JUA	SJT	SAR	SPP
Altos Hornos Zapla		1–0	0–0	2–1	1–1	3–1	0–0	0–1	0–1	1–0
Chaco For Ever	3–0		1–1	1–1	2–0	2–1	0–0	1–0	1–1	0–0
Crucero del Norte	5–1	2–0		0–0	1–2	0–0	2–0	1–2	2–3	4–2
Deportivo Mandiyú	1–2	1–0	0–0		1–2	0–1	1–1	2–1	2–0	0–1
Gimnasia y Tiro	0–0	1–3	4–2	0–0		1–0	0–0	1–0	1–2	2–0
Guaraní Antonio Franco	0–1	1–2	0–1	4–1	1–3		2–3	2–0	0–0	2–2
Juventud Antoniana	0–0	1–2	1–1	2–1	1–1	1–0		1–0	0–1	1–0
San Jorge (T)	1–2	0–0	0–1	1–1	0–0	3–0	1–1		0–1	1–0
Sarmiento (R)	0–0	0–0	1–1	1–0	1–1	3–1	2–0	1–1		4–2
Sportivo Patria	2–0	0–1	0–2	4–1	2–2	2–1	1–1	2–3	1–3	

Updated to match(es) played on unknown. Source: AFA
Legend: Blue = home team win; Yellow = draw; Red = away team win.

== Championship stages ==
=== Second stage ===
==== Zone A ====
Pos	Team	Pld	W	D	L	GF	GA	GD	Pts	Qualification
1	Estudiantes (RC)	7	5	0	2	13	6	+7	15	Advance to Third Stage
2	Gimnasia y Esgrima (M)	7	4	2	1	11	6	+5	14	Advance to Third Stage
3	Juventud Unida Universitario	7	4	1	2	9	7	+2	13	Advance to Third Stage
4	Alvarado	7	3	1	3	8	8	0	10	Advance to Second Phase of Reválida Stage
5	Deportivo Roca	7	3	0	4	12	14	−2	9	Advance to Second Phase of Reválida Stage
6	Desamparados	7	2	2	3	4	6	−2	8	Advance to Second Phase of Reválida Stage
7	Villa Mitre	7	1	2	4	6	10	−4	5 (Note: Villa Mitre ahead of Ferro Carril Oeste (GP) on goal difference: Villa Mitre -4 goal difference; Ferro Carril Oeste (GP) -6 goal difference)	Advance to Second Phase of Reválida Stage
8	Ferro Carril Oeste (GP)	7	1	2	4	5	11	−6	5	Advance to Second Phase of Reválida Stage

Updated to match(es) played on March 19, 2018. Source: AFA
Rules for classification: 1) points; 2) goal difference; 3) goals scored; 4) draw of lots.

===== Results =====
Home \ Away	ALV	DRO	DES	EST	FCO	GEM	JUU	VMI
Alvarado			0–0		3–1	1–2		1–0
Deportivo Roca	4–2				4–1	0–2		
Desamparados		1–0		0–1			0–1	
Estudiantes (RC)	1–0	6–1					4–2	1–0
Ferro Carril Oeste (GP)			0–1	1–0			1–1	
Gimnasia y Esgrima (M)			1–1	2–0	1–0			2–2
Juventud Unida Universitario	0–1	2–0				2–1		
Villa Mitre		0–3	3–1		1–1		0–1	

Updated to match(es) played on unknown. Source: AFA
Legend: Blue = home team win; Yellow = draw; Red = away team win.

==== Zone B ====
Pos	Team	Pld	W	D	L	GF	GA	GD	Pts	Qualification
1	Central Córdoba (SdE)	7	4	2	1	10	5	+5	14	Advance to Third Stage
2	Defensores de Belgrano (VR)	7	4	1	2	11	5	+6	13	Advance to Third Stage
3	Unión (S)	7	3	1	3	9	8	+1	10 (Note: Goals scored: Unión (S) 9 goals; Sportivo Belgrano 8 goals; Crucero del Norte 7 goals.)	Advance to Third Phase of Reválida Stage
4	Sportivo Belgrano	7	3	1	3	8	7	+1	10	Advance to Second Phase of Reválida Stage
5	Crucero del Norte	7	3	1	3	7	6	+1	10	Advance to Second Phase of Reválida Stage
6	Sarmiento (R)	7	2	3	2	5	9	−4	9	Advance to Second Phase of Reválida Stage
7	Chaco For Ever	7	2	0	5	5	8	−3	6 (Note: Chaco For Ever ahead of Gimnasia y Tiro on goal difference: Chaco For Ever -3 goal difference; Gimnasia y Tiro -7 goal difference.)	Advance to Second Phase of Reválida Stage
8	Gimnasia y Tiro	7	1	3	3	7	14	−7	6	Advance to Second Phase of Reválida Stage

Updated to match(es) played on March 19, 2018. Source: AFA
Rules for classification: 1) points; 2) goal difference; 3) goals scored; 4) draw of lots.

===== Results =====
Home \ Away	CCO	CFE	CRU	DEF	GYT	SAR	SPB	UNS
Central Córdoba (SdE)		1–0	2–1				2–0	0–0
Chaco For Ever			1–0	0–1	1–2			3–0
Crucero del Norte				2–1			1–0	3–1
Defensores de Belgrano (VR)	1–0				5–0	2–2		
Gimnasia y Tiro	3–5		0–0			1–1		
Sarmiento (R)	0–0	1–0	1–0					0–2
Sportivo Belgrano		3–0		1–0	0–0	4–0		
Unión (S)				0–1	2–1		4–0	

Updated to match(es) played on unknown. Source: AFA
Legend: Blue = home team win; Yellow = draw; Red = away team win.

=== Ranking of third-placed teams ===
Pos	Grp	Team	Pld	W	D	L	GF	GA	GD	Pts	Qualification
1	A	Juventud Unida Universitario	7	4	1	2	9	7	+2	13	Advance to Third Stage
2	B	Unión (S)	7	3	1	3	9	8	+1	10	Advance to Third Phase of Reválida Stage

Rules for classification: 1) points; 2) goal difference; 3) goal scored; 4) draw of lots.

=== Third stage ===
Pos	Team	Pld	W	D	L	GF	GA	GD	Pts	Qualification
1	Central Córdoba (SdE) (C, P)	4	3	1	0	8	3	+5	10	Promoted to Primera B Nacional
2	Gimnasia y Esgrima (M)	4	2	1	1	7	5	+2	7	Advance to Fourth Phase of Reválida Stage
3	Defensores de Belgrano (VR)	4	1	1	2	3	3	0	4	Advance to Fourth Phase of Reválida Stage
4	Juventud Unida Universitario	4	1	1	2	4	7	−3	4	Advance to Fourth Phase of Reválida Stage
5	Estudiantes (RC)	4	1	0	3	2	6	−4	3	Advance to Fourth Phase of Reválida Stage

Source: AFA
Rules for classification: 1) points; 2) goal difference; 3) goals scored; 4) draw of lots.
(C) Champions; (P) Promoted

==== Results ====
Home \ Away	EST	GEM	CCO	DEF	JUU
Estudiantes (RC)		2–1	0–2		
Gimnasia y Esgrima (M)			1–1		4–2
Central Córdoba (SdE)				2–1	3–1
Defensores de Belgrano (VR)	2–0	0–1			
Juventud Unida Universitario	1–0			0–0	

Updated to match(es) played on unknown. Source: AFA
Legend: Blue = home team win; Yellow = draw; Red = away team win.

== Reválida Stage ==
=== First phase ===
==== Zone A ====
Pos	Team	Pld	W	D	L	GF	GA	GD	Pts	Qualification
1	Deportivo Madryn	8	5	2	1	10	5	+5	17	Advance to Second Phase of Reválida Stage
2	Sansinena	8	4	2	2	9	7	+2	14	
3	Independiente (N)	8	2	3	3	7	12	−5	9	
4	Rivadavia (L)	8	2	2	4	9	11	−2	8	
5	Cipolletti	8	2	1	5	9	9	0	7	

Updated to match(es) played on March 26, 2018. Source: AFA
Rules for classification: 1) points; 2) Head-to-head points; 3) Head-to-head goal difference; 4) Head-to-head goals scored; 5) Head-to-head away goals; 6) goal difference; 7) goals scored; 8) away goals scored; 9) draw of lots.

===== Results =====
Home \ Away	CIP	DMA	INE	RIV	SAN
Cipolletti		0–1	0–1	3–0	0–1
Deportivo Madryn	2–1		1–1	0–0	1–0
Independiente (N)	0–3	1–2		3–1	1–1
Rivadavia (L)	1–1	0–2	4–0		0–2
Sansinena	3–1	2–1	0–0	0–3	

Updated to match(es) played on unknown. Source: AFA
Legend: Blue = home team win; Yellow = draw; Red = away team win.

==== Zone B ====
Pos	Team	Pld	W	D	L	GF	GA	GD	Pts	Qualification
1	Huracán Las Heras	10	5	4	1	15	7	+8	19	Advance to Second Phase of Reválida Stage
2	Unión (VK)	10	4	3	3	9	8	+1	15	
3	San Lorenzo	10	3	4	3	10	13	−3	13 (Note: San Lorenzo ahead of Deportivo Maipú on head-to-head away goals: San Lorenzo–Deportivo Maipú 1–1, Deportivo Maipú–San Lorenzo 2–2.)	
4	Deportivo Maipú	10	2	7	1	15	14	+1	13	
5	Unión Aconquija	10	2	4	4	9	13	−4	10	
6	Gutiérrez SC	10	2	2	6	11	14	−3	8	

Updated to match(es) played on March 26, 2018. Source: AFA
Rules for classification: 1) points; 2) Head-to-head points; 3) Head-to-head goal difference; 4) Head-to-head goals scored; 5) Head-to-head away goals; 6) goal difference; 7) goals scored; 8) away goals scored; 9) draw of lots.

===== Results =====
Home \ Away	DEM	GSC	HLH	SLA	UVK	UAC
Deportivo Maipú		1–1	2–2	2–2	3–2	2–2
Gutiérrez SC	0–2		0–1	4–1	0–1	3–4
Huracán Las Heras	2–0	1–1		3–0	0–0	3–0
San Lorenzo	1–1	1–0	3–1		1–1	0–0
Unión (VK)	0–0	1–2	1–2	1–0		1–0
Unión Aconquija	2–2	1–0	0–0	0–1	0–1	

Updated to match(es) played on unknown. Source: AFA
Legend: Blue = home team win; Yellow = draw; Red = away team win.

==== Zone C ====
Pos	Team	Pld	W	D	L	GF	GA	GD	Pts	Qualification
1	Atlético Paraná	10	5	3	2	15	9	+6	18	Advance to Second Phase of Reválida Stage
2	Sportivo Las Parejas	10	5	2	3	13	8	+5	17	
3	Defensores (P)	10	3	4	3	12	12	0	13	
4	Douglas Haig	10	2	6	2	15	19	−4	12	
5	Libertad (S)	10	2	4	4	13	16	−3	10	
6	Gimnasia y Esgrima (CdU)	10	2	3	5	12	16	−4	9	

Updated to match(es) played on March 26, 2018. Source: AFA
Rules for classification: 1) points; 2) Head-to-head points; 3) Head-to-head goal difference; 4) Head-to-head goals scored; 5) Head-to-head away goals; 6) goal difference; 7) goals scored; 8) away goals scored; 9) draw of lots.

===== Results =====
Home \ Away	APA	DPR	DOU	GYE	LIB	SLP
Atlético Paraná		1–0	5–1	1–0	2–0	1–1
Defensores (P)	0–0		4–1	2–2	2–1	1–0
Douglas Haig	1–1	1–1		4–2	2–2	1–0
Gimnasia y Esgrima (CdU)	1–3	3–0	0–0		2–2	1–0
Libertad (S)	2–1	1–1	2–2	2–1		0–1
Sportivo Las Parejas	3–0	2–1	2–2	2–0	2–1	

Updated to match(es) played on unknown. Source: AFA
Legend: Blue = home team win; Yellow = draw; Red = away team win.

==== Zone D ====
Pos	Team	Pld	W	D	L	GF	GA	GD	Pts	Qualification
1	San Jorge (T)	10	5	4	1	14	9	+5	19	Advance to Second Phase of Reválida Stage
2	Sportivo Patria	10	3	5	2	18	14	+4	14 (Note: Sportivo Patria ahead of Deportivo Mandiyú on head-to-head points: Sportivo Patria–Deportivo Mandiyú 5–1, Deportivo Mandiyú–Sportivo Patria 1–1.)	
3	Deportivo Mandiyú	10	3	5	2	10	10	0	14	
4	Juventud Antoniana	10	3	3	4	12	12	0	12	
5	Altos Hornos Zapla	10	1	6	3	8	11	−3	9	
6	Guaraní Antonio Franco	10	1	5	4	10	16	−6	8	

Updated to match(es) played on March 26, 2018. Source: AFA
Rules for classification: 1) points; 2) Head-to-head points; 3) Head-to-head goal difference; 4) Head-to-head goals scored; 5) Head-to-head away goals; 6) goal difference; 7) goals scored; 8) away goals scored; 9) draw of lots.

===== Results =====
Home \ Away	AHZ	DEP	GAF	JUA	SJT	SPP
Altos Hornos Zapla		0–0	2–3	2–2	0–1	2–1
Deportivo Mandiyú	0–0		0–0	1–0	0–1	1–1
Guaraní Antonio Franco	0–0	2–4		1–4	2–3	0–0
Juventud Antoniana	1–1	0–2	1–0		1–2	1–2
San Jorge (T)	2–0	1–1	0–0	0–0		2–3
Sportivo Patria	1–1	5–1	2–2	1–2	2–2	

Updated to match(es) played on unknown. Source: AFA
Legend: Blue = home team win; Yellow = draw; Red = away team win.

=== Second phase ===
Pos	Team	Pld	W	D	L	GF	GA	GD	Pts	Qualification
1	Sportivo Belgrano	7	3	1	3	8	7	+1	10	Qualified from Second Stage
2	Alvarado	7	3	1	3	8	8	0	10	Qualified from Second Stage
3	Crucero del Norte	7	3	1	3	7	6	+1	10	Qualified from Second Stage
4	Deportivo Roca	7	3	0	4	12	14	−2	9	Qualified from Second Stage
5	Sarmiento (R)	7	2	3	2	5	9	−4	9	Qualified from Second Stage
6	Desamparados	7	2	2	3	4	6	−2	8	Qualified from Second Stage
7	Chaco For Ever	7	2	0	5	5	8	−3	6	Qualified from Second Stage
8	Villa Mitre	7	1	2	4	6	10	−4	5	Qualified from Second Stage
9	Gimnasia y Tiro	7	1	3	3	7	14	−7	6	Qualified from Second Stage
10	Ferro Carril Oeste (GP)	7	1	2	4	5	11	−6	5	Qualified from Second Stage

Pos	Team	Reválida Stage Pts	Total Pld	Avg	Goal Difference	Qualification
11	Deportivo Madryn	17	8	2.125	+1	Qualified from First Phase of Reválida Stage
12	Huracán Las Heras	19	10	1.9	+8	Qualified from First Phase of Reválida Stage
13	San Jorge (T)	19	10	1.9	+5	Qualified from First Phase of Reválida Stage
14	Atlético Paraná	18	10	1.8	+6	Qualified from First Phase of Reválida Stage

Team 1	Agg.	Team 2	1st leg	2nd leg
Sportivo Belgrano	5–3	Atlético Paraná	1–1	4–2
Alvarado	1–1 (4–2 p)	San Jorge (T)	1–1	0–0
Crucero del Norte	2–1	Huracán Las Heras	0–1	2–0
Deportivo Roca	1–2	Deportivo Madryn	0–1	1–1
Sarmiento (R)	2–0	Ferro Carril Oeste (GP)	2–0	0–0
Desamparados	1–1 (3–4 p)	Gimnasia y Tiro	0–1	1–0
Chaco For Ever	2–0	Villa Mitre	0–0	2–0

=== Third phase ===
Pos	Team	Pld	W	D	L	GF	GA	GD	Pts	Qualification
1	Unión (S)	7	3	1	3	9	8	+1	10	Qualified from Second Stage
2	Sportivo Belgrano	7	3	1	3	8	7	+1	10	Qualified from Second Stage
3	Alvarado	7	3	1	3	8	8	0	10	Qualified from Second Stage
4	Crucero del Norte	7	3	1	3	7	6	+1	10	Qualified from Second Stage
5	Sarmiento (R)	7	2	3	2	5	9	−4	9	Qualified from Second Stage
6	Chaco For Ever	7	2	0	5	5	8	−3	6	Qualified from Second Stage
7	Gimnasia y Tiro	7	1	3	3	7	14	−7	6	Qualified from Second Stage

Pos	Team	Reválida Stage Pts	Total Pld	Avg	Goal Difference	Qualification
8	Deportivo Madryn	17	8	2.125	+1	Qualified from First Phase of Reválida Stage

Team 1	Agg.	Team 2	1st leg	2nd leg
Unión (S)	1–3	Deportivo Madryn	0–2	1–1
Sportivo Belgrano	3–3 (4–2 p)	Gimnasia y Tiro	1–2	2–1
Alvarado	4–3	Chaco For Ever	1–2	3–1
Crucero del Norte	1–0	Sarmiento (R)	1–0	0–0

=== Fourth to Sixth phase ===
Pos	Team	Pld	W	D	L	GF	GA	GD	Pts	Qualification
1	Gimnasia y Esgrima (M)	11	6	3	2	18	11	+7	21	Qualified from Third Stage
2	Estudiantes (RC)	11	6	0	5	15	12	+3	18	Qualified from Third Stage
3	Defensores de Belgrano (VR)	11	5	2	4	14	8	+6	17	Qualified from Third Stage
4	Juventud Unida Universitario	11	5	2	4	13	14	−1	17	Qualified from Third Stage
5	Sportivo Belgrano	7	3	1	3	8	7	+1	10	Qualified from Second Stage
6	Alvarado	7	3	1	3	8	8	0	10	Qualified from Second Stage
7	Crucero del Norte	7	3	1	3	7	6	+1	10	Qualified from Second Stage

Pos	Team	Reválida Stage Pts	Total Pld	Avg	Goal Difference	Qualification
8	Deportivo Madryn	17	8	2.125	+1	Qualified from First Phase of Reválida Stage

==== Fourth phase ====
Team 1	Agg.	Team 2	1st leg	2nd leg
Gimnasia y Esgrima (M)	5–4	Deportivo Madryn	2–4	3–0
Estudiantes (RC)	0–0 (5–3 p)	Crucero del Norte	0–0	0–0
Defensores de Belgrano (VR)	0–0 (4–3 p)	Alvarado	0–0	0–0
Juventud Unida Universitario	3–4	Sportivo Belgrano	2–2	1–2

==== Fifth phase ====
Team 1	Agg.	Team 2	1st leg	2nd leg
Gimnasia y Esgrima (M)	2–0	Sportivo Belgrano	1–0	1–0
Estudiantes (RC)	2–2 (3–4 p)	Defensores de Belgrano (VR)	1–1	1–1

==== Sixth phase ====
Team 1	Agg.	Team 2	1st leg	2nd leg
Gimnasia y Esgrima (M)	1–0	Defensores de Belgrano (VR)	0–0	1–0

== Relegation ==
=== Zone A ===
Pos	Team	First Stage Pts	Reválida Stage Pts	Total Pts	Total Pld	Avg	Relegation
1	Deportivo Madryn	16	17	33	24	1.375	
2	Cipolletti	23	7	30	24	1.25	
3	Sansinena	16	14	30	24	1.25	
4	Independiente (N)	19	9	28	24	1.167	
5	Rivadavia (L)	17	8	25	24	1.042	Torneo Federal B

=== Zone B ===
Pos	Team	First Stage Pts	Reválida Stage Pts	Total Pts	Total Pld	Avg	Relegation
1	Huracán Las Heras	22	19	41	28	1.464	
2	Deportivo Maipú	26	13	39	28	1.393	
3	San Lorenzo	20	13	33	28	1.179	
4	Unión (VK)	17	15	32	28	1.143	
5	Unión Aconquija	13	10	23	28	0.821	
6	Gutiérrez SC	13	8	21	28	0.75	Torneo Federal B

=== Zone C ===
Pos	Team	First Stage Pts	Reválida Stage Pts	Total Pts	Total Pld	Avg	Relegation
1	Sportivo Las Parejas	23	17	40	28	1.429	
2	Douglas Haig	26	12	38	28	1.357	
3	Defensores (P)	22	13	35	28	1.25	
4	Atlético Paraná	16	18	34	28	1.214	
5	Gimnasia y Esgrima (CdU)	25	9	34	28	1.214	
6	Libertad (S)	14	10	24	28	0.857	Torneo Federal B

=== Zone D ===
Pos	Team	First Stage Pts	Reválida Stage Pts	Total Pts	Total Pld	Avg	Relegation
1	San Jorge (T)	20	19	39	28	1.393	
2	Juventud Antoniana	24	12	36	28	1.286	
3	Altos Hornos Zapla	24	12	36	28	1.286	
4	Sportivo Patria	16	14	30	28	1.071	
5	Deportivo Mandiyú	15	14	29	28	1.036	
6	Guaraní Antonio Franco	12	8	20	28	0.714	Torneo Federal B

=== General table ===
Pos	Team	First Stage Pts	Reválida Stage Pts	Total Pts	Total Pld	Avg	Relegation
1	Huracán Las Heras	22	19	41	28	1.464	
2	Sportivo Las Parejas	23	17	40	28	1.429	
3	Deportivo Maipú	26	13	39	28	1.393	
4	San Jorge (T)	20	19	39	28	1.393	
5	Deportivo Madryn	16	17	33	24	1.375	
6	Douglas Haig	26	12	38	28	1.357	
7	Juventud Antoniana	24	12	36	28	1.286	
8	Altos Hornos Zapla	24	12	36	28	1.286	
9	Cipolletti	23	7	30	24	1.25	
10	Sansinena	16	14	30	24	1.25	
11	Defensores (P)	22	13	35	28	1.25	
12	Atlético Paraná	16	18	34	28	1.214	
13	Gimnasia y Esgrima (CdU)	25	9	34	28	1.214	
14	San Lorenzo	20	13	33	28	1.179	
15	Independiente (N)	19	9	28	24	1.167	
16	Unión (VK)	17	15	32	28	1.143	Torneo Federal B
17	Sportivo Patria	16	14	30	28	1.071	Torneo Federal B
18	Deportivo Mandiyú	15	14	29	28	1.036	Torneo Federal B
19	Unión Aconquija	13	10	23	28	0.821	Torneo Federal B

== Season statistics ==
=== Top scorers ===
As of May 21, 2018

Rank	Player	Club	Goals
1	(Paraguay) Pablo Palacios Alvarenga	Gimnasia y Esgrima (M)	21
1	(Argentina) Luis Silba	Sarmiento (R)	16
3	(Argentina) Diego Jara	Central Córdoba (SdE)	13
4	(Argentina) Cristian Campozano	Sportivo Patria	12

== See also ==
- 2017–18 Primera B Nacional
- 2017–18 Copa Argentina
