= 2012–13 Copa Argentina =

Tournament details
- Country: Argentina
- Teams: 224

Final positions
- Champions: Arsenal (1st title)
- Runners-up: San Lorenzo
- 2014 Copa Libertadores: Arsenal

Tournament statistics
- Matches played: 223
- Goals scored: 529 (2.37 per match)
- Top goal scorer(s): Daniel Bazán Vera; 5 goals

The 2012–13 Copa Argentina was the fourth edition of the Copa Argentina, and the second since the relaunch of the tournament in 2011. The competition began on October 23, 2012. The tournament featured 224 clubs from the top four levels of the Argentine football league system. The winner (Arsenal) qualified for the 2014 Copa Libertadores and the 2013 Supercopa Argentina.

== Teams ==
The 224 teams that took part in this competition included: all the teams from the Primera División (20), Primera B Nacional (20), Primera B Metropolitana (21), Torneo Argentino A (25), Primera C (20), Torneo Argentino B (100), and Primera D (18).

Primera División

- All Boys
- Argentinos Juniors
- Arsenal
- Atlético de Rafaela
- Belgrano
- Boca Juniors
- Colón
- Estudiantes (LP)
- Godoy Cruz
- Independiente
- Lanús
- Newell's Old Boys
- Quilmes
- Racing
- River Plate
- San Lorenzo
- San Martín (SJ)
- Tigre
- Unión (SF)
- Vélez Sársfield

Primera B Nacional

- Aldosivi
- Almirante Brown
- Atlético Tucumán
- Banfield
- Boca Unidos
- Crucero del Norte
- Defensa y Justicia
- Deportivo Merlo
- Douglas Haig
- Ferro Carril Oeste
- Gimnasia y Esgrima (J)
- Gimnasia y Esgrima (LP)
- Huracán
- Independiente Rivadavia
- Instituto
- Nueva Chicago
- Olimpo
- Patronato
- Rosario Central
- Sarmiento (J)

Primera B Metropolitana

- Acassuso
- Almagro
- Atlanta
- Barracas Central
- Brown
- Central Córdoba (R)
- Chacarita Juniors
- Colegiales
- Comunicaciones
- Defensores de Belgrano
- Deportivo Armenio
- Deportivo Morón
- Estudiantes (BA)
- Flandria
- Los Andes
- Platense
- San Telmo
- Temperley
- Tristán Suárez
- Villa Dálmine
- Villa San Carlos

Torneo Argentino A

- Alumni (VM)
- Alvarado
- Central Córdoba (SdE)
- Central Norte
- Cipolletti
- Defensores de Belgrano (VR)
- Deportivo Maipú
- Desamparados
- Gimnasia y Esgrima (CdU)
- Gimnasia y Tiro
- Guaraní Antonio Franco
- Guillermo Brown
- Juventud Antoniana
- Juventud Unida Universitario
- Libertad (S)
- Racing (C)
- Racing (O)
- Rivadavia (L)
- San Jorge (T)
- San Martín (T)
- Santamarina
- Sportivo Belgrano
- Talleres (C)
- Tiro Federal
- Unión (MdP)

Primera C

- Argentino (M)
- Berazategui
- Defensores de Cambaceres
- Defensores Unidos
- Deportivo Español
- Deportivo Laferrere
- Dock Sud
- El Porvenir
- Excursionistas
- Fénix
- Ferrocarril Midland
- General Lamadrid
- J. J. de Urquiza
- Liniers
- Luján
- Sacachispas
- San Miguel
- Sportivo Italiano
- Talleres (RE)
- UAI Urquiza

Torneo Argentino B

- 9 de Julio (M)
- 9 de Julio (R)
- Alianza (CM)
- Alianza (CC)
- Altos Hornos Zapla
- Alvear
- Américo Tesiorieri
- Andes Talleres
- Andino
- Argentino Agropecuario
- Atenas (RC)
- Belgrano (P)
- Bella Vista (BB)
- Ben Hur
- Boca (RG)
- Chaco For Ever
- Colegiales (C)
- CAI
- Comunicaciones (M)
- Concepción (BRS)
- Concepción
- Cruz del Sur
- Defensores (P)
- Defensores (S)
- Deportivo Aguilares
- Deportivo Madryn
- Deportivo Mandiyú
- Deportivo Patagones
- Deportivo Roca
- El Linqueño
- Estudiantes (RC)
- Estudiantes (SL)
- Famaillá
- Ferro Carril Oeste (GP)
- Ferro Carril Sud
- Fontana
- General Paz Juniors
- Germinal
- Gimnasia y Esgrima (Mza)
- Grupo Universitario (T)
- Guaymallén
- Güemes
- Gutiérrez
- Huracán (CR)
- Huracán (G)
- Huracán (LH)
- Huracán (SR)
- Huracán (TA)
- Independiente (C)
- Independiente (N)
- Independiente (RC)
- Jorge Brown (P)
- Jorge Newbery (CR)
- Jorge Newbery (VT)
- Juventud Alianza
- Juventud Unida (G)
- La Emilia
- Las Heras (C)
- Liniers (BB)
- Maronese
- Mercedes
- Mitre (S)
- Mitre (SdE)
- Monterrico San Vicente
- Once Tigres
- Pacífico
- Paraná
- Policial
- Sportivo Peñarol
- Racing (T)
- River Plate (E)
- Rosamonte

v San Jorge (SF)

- San Lorenzo (A)
- San Martín (F)
- San Martín (M)
- Sanjustino
- Sarmiento (C)
- Sarmiento (R)
- Sarmiento (SdE)
- Sol de América (F)
- Sol de Mayo
- Sportivo Del Bono
- Sportivo Fernández
- Sportivo Huracán (GG)
- Sportivo Las Parejas
- Sportivo Patria
- Sportivo Rivadavia
- Talleres (P)
- Textil Mandiyú
- Tiro Federal (BB)
- Tiro Federal (M)
- Trinidad
- Uruguay
- Unión Aconquija
- Unión (S)
- Unión (VK)
- Villa Belgrano
- Villa Cubas (C)
- Villa Mitre

Primera D

- Argentino (Q)
- Argentino (R)
- Atlas
- Cañuelas
- Central Ballester
- Centro Español
- Claypole
- Deportivo Paraguayo
- Deportivo Riestra
- Ituzaingó
- Juventud Unida
- Leandro N. Alem
- Lugano
- Muñiz
- Puerto Nuevo
- San Martín (B)
- Victoriano Arenas
- Yupanqui

== Format ==
The tournament was competed in two phases organized in multiple single-elimination rounds.

The first phase consisted of four rounds divided between Metropolitan and Interior zones. The first round involved the 100 teams from the Torneo Argentino B in a single elimination round. The second round was played by the 50 winners from the first round along with the 18 teams of the Primera D Metropolitana and the 7 lowest teams plus the most recently promoted team of the Primera C Metropolitana. The third round had the 13 winners of the Metropolitan zones from the last round plus the 12 remaining teams from the Primera C Metropolitana and the 21 teams of the Primera B Metropolitana, producing 23 teams. This round also saw the 25 winners of the Interior zones against the 25 teams of the Torneo Argentina A, producing 25 teams. The final round of the first phase saw 48 winners of the previous round (23 from the Metropolitan zone and 25 from the Interior zone) in a single elimination producing 24 teams that enter the second phase.

The Second Phase began with a classification round where the 16 non-champion teams of the B Nacional determined the 8 teams to move forward. The next round saw the 24 teams from the first phase, the 8 winners of the previous round, the remaining champion teams of the Primera B Nacional (Huracán, Ferro Carril Oeste, Rosario Central, and Banfield), and the 12 non-champion teams from the Primera Division in four brackets. The 8 champion teams (River Plate, Boca Juniors, Independiente, Vélez Sársfield, Racing, San Lorenzo, Estudiantes (LP), and Newell's Old Boys) joined the bracket with 24 winning teams.

== Preliminary phase ==
October 23, 2012	Villa Cubas (C)	3–1	San Lorenzo (A)

October 23, 2012	Unión (VK)	2–2 (4–2 p)	Sportivo Del Bono

October 24, 2012	Monterrico San Vicente	1–1 (3–4 p)	River Plate (E)

== Initial phase ==
=== First round ===
October 23, 2012	Deportivo Español	3–3 (4–3 p)	Muñiz

October 24, 2012	Luján	2–0	Central Ballester

October 24, 2012	Argentino (M)	1–3	Puerto Nuevo

October 24, 2012	Sacachispas	6–0	Lugano

October 24, 2012	Fénix	0–2	Claypole

October 24, 2012	Leandro N. Alem	1–1 (4–1 p)	Juventud Unida

October 30, 2012	El Porvenir	1–1 (3–2 p)	Deportivo Paraguayo

October 31, 2012	Liniers	2–0	Argentino (R)

October 31, 2012	Argentino (Q)	1–1 (3–0 p)	Victoriano Arenas

October 31, 2012	Atlas	1–0	Yupanqui

October 31, 2012	Centro Español	1–1 (5–4 p)	Cañuelas

October 31, 2012	Deportivo Riestra	3–0	San Martín (B)

=== Second round ===
November 6, 2012	Platense	2–0	Argentino (Q)

November 6, 2012	Deportivo Armenio	1–0	Deportivo Español

November 6, 2012	Barracas Central	1–2	Ferrocarril Midland

November 6, 2012	Comunicaciones	0–1	Liniers

November 7, 2012	Chacarita Juniors	5–0	Puerto Nuevo

November 7, 2012	Atlanta	1–1 (2–4 p)	Claypole

November 7, 2012	Los Andes	0–1	Leandro N. Alem

November 7, 2012	Brown	3–2	Atlas

November 7, 2012	Colegiales	1–1 (4–5 p)	Deportivo Riestra

November 7, 2012	Deportivo Morón	2–1	Dock Sud

November 7, 2012	Tristán Suárez	4–2	Talleres (RE)

November 7, 2012	San Telmo	1–1 (4–3 p)	San Miguel

November 7, 2012	Villa San Carlos	0–2	El Porvenir

November 7, 2012	Acassuso	0–2	Defensores Unidos

November 7, 2012	General Lamadrid	0–2	UAI Urquiza

November 7, 2012	Sportivo Italiano	0–0 (3–2 p)	Defensores de Cambaceres

November 13, 2012	Flandria	0–0 (6–5 p)	Luján

November 14, 2012	Temperley	0–0 (3–4 p)	Excursionistas

November 14, 2012	Villa Dálmine	0–0 (1–4 p)	Deportivo Laferrere

November 14, 2012	Defensores de Belgrano	0–1	Berazategui

November 14, 2012	Almagro	1–0	Sacachispas

November 14, 2012	Central Córdoba (R)	1–0	J.J. Urquiza

November 15, 2012	Estudiantes (BA)	1–1 (4–2 p)	Centro Español

=== Third round ===
November 6, 2012	Américo Tesiorieri	6–0	Mitre (S)

November 7, 2012	Famaillá	1–1 (4–3 p)	Concepción (BRS)

November 7, 2012	Mitre (SdE)	0–0 (3–4 p)	Sarmiento (SdE)

November 7, 2012	Argentino Agropecuario	2–2 (5–4 p)	El Linqueño

November 7, 2012	Grupo Universitario (T)	1–1 (5–4 p)	Alvear

November 7, 2012	Maronese	1–1 (0–3 p)	Cruz del Sur

November 7, 2012	Atenas (RC)	3–1	Estudiantes (SL)

November 7, 2012	Juventud Unida (G)	0–1	Paraná

November 7, 2012	Deportivo Mandiyú	3–1	Comunicaciones (M)

November 7, 2012	Sarmiento (R)	0–1	Jorge Brown (P)

November 7, 2012	Sportivo Patria	4–2	Fontana

November 7, 2012	Colegiales (C)	1–0	La Emilia

November 7, 2012	Tiro Federal (BB)	0–1	Villa Mitre

November 7, 2012	Deportivo Roca	0–2	Sol de Mayo

November 7, 2012	CAI	5–2	Deportivo Madryn

November 7, 2012	Boca (RG)	2–0	Jorge Newbery (CR)

November 7, 2012	Gimnasia y Esgrima (Mza)	1–1 (4–5 p)	San Martín (Mza)

November 7, 2012	Juventud Alianza	1–1 (4–5 p)	Unión (VK)

November 7, 2012	Defensores (P)	0–0 (3–5 p)	Sportivo Rivadavia

November 7, 2012	Gutiérrez	1–1 (9–8 p)	Pacífico

November 7, 2012	9 de Julio (M)	2–1	General Paz Juniors

November 7, 2012	Ben Hur	2–1	San Jorge (SF)

November 8, 2012	Policial	0–1	Villa Cubas (C)

November 8, 2012	Once Tigres	2–1	Defensores (S)

November 14, 2012	Altos Hornos Zapla	2–2 (5–3 p)	River Plate (E)

=== Fourth round ===
November 21, 2012	Platense	1–0	Liniers

November 21, 2012	Tristán Suárez	4–0	Deportivo Laferrere

November 21, 2012	Flandria	0–0 (4–5 p)	Excursionistas

November 21, 2012	Brown	1–0	Leandro N. Alem

November 21, 2012	Chacarita Juniors	4–0	Claypole

November 21, 2012	San Telmo	1–1 (2–3 p)	Ferrocarril Midland

November 21, 2012	Deportivo Armenio	1–1 (3–1 p)	El Porvenir

November 28, 2012	Sportivo Italiano	1–1 (5–6 p)	UAI Urquiza

November 30, 2012	Alvarado	0–0 (4–2 p)	Argentino Agropecuario

December 5, 2012	Estudiantes (BA)	2–0	Deportivo Riestra

December 5, 2012	Guillermo Brown	1–0	Boca (RG)

December 5, 2012	Unión (VK)	2–1	San Martín (M)

December 5, 2012	Talleres (C)	3–0	Racing (C)

December 5, 2012	Jorge Brown (P)	2–1	Deportivo Mandiyú

December 5, 2012	Sportivo Belgrano	2–1	Atenas

December 5, 2012	Santamarina	2–0	Defensores de Belgrano (VR)

December 5, 2012	Gimnasia y Esgrima (CdU)	0–0 (4–3 p)	Ben Hur

December 5, 2012	San Martín (T)	3–1	San Jorge (T)

December 5, 2012	Central Norte	1–0	Gimnasia y Tiro (S)
		8

December 6, 2012	Juventud Antoniana	3–0	Central Córdoba (SdE)

December 6, 2012	Central Córdoba (R)	0–0 (4–3 p)	Sportivo Rivadavia

December 6, 2012	Villa Mitre	0–2	Racing (O)

January 23, 2013	Almagro	0–1	Defensores Unidos

January 23, 2013	Deportivo Morón	5–1	Berazategui

== Final phase ==
=== Preliminary round ===
January 25, 2013	Almirante Brown	2–0	Sarmiento (J)

January 26, 2013	Gimnasia y Esgrima (LP)	3–0	Douglas Haig

January 26, 2013	Atlético Tucumán	2–2 (6–5 p)	Gimnasia y Esgrima (J)

January 27, 2013	Olimpo	4–1	Aldosivi

January 27, 2013	Patronato	2–0	Nueva Chicago

January 27, 2013	Defensa y Justicia	2–1	Deportivo Merlo

January 29, 2013	Boca Unidos	4–0	Crucero del Norte

January 29, 2013	Instituto	1–1 (4–3 p)	Independiente Rivadavia

=== Elimination round ===
==== Zone 1 ====
March 12, 2013	Almirante Brown	0–0 (2–4 p)	Deportivo Armenio

February 20, 2013	Defensa y Justicia	0–3	Estudiantes (BA)

March 13, 2013	Banfield	2–1	Central Norte

March 13, 2013	Belgrano	0–1	Talleres (C)

March 21, 2013	Tigre	0–1	Juventud Antoniana

March 26, 2013	Argentinos Juniors	0–0 (2–4 p)	Sportivo Belgrano

==== Zone 2 ====
February 12, 2013	San Martín (SJ)	0–0 (2–3 p)	Unión (VK)

February 13, 2013	All Boys	4–1	Brown

February 20, 2013	Rosario Central	1–2	Central Córdoba (R)

March 5, 2013	Quilmes	3–1	Ferrocarril Midland

March 6, 2013	Atlético Tucumán	3–1	San Martín (T)

March 6, 2013	Excursionistas	0–0 (3–2 p)	Gimnasia y Esgrima (LP)

==== Zone 3 ====
February 19, 2013	Godoy Cruz	0–0 (7–6 p)	Chacarita Juniors

February 20, 2013	Colón	1–2	Platense

February 21, 2013	Olimpo	2–1	Guillermo Brown

March 6, 2013	Huracán	5–1	Racing (O)

March 13, 2013	Boca Unidos	1–0	Jorge Brown (P)

March 26, 2013	Arsenal	2–0	Santamarina

==== Zone 4 ====
February 13, 2013	Atlético Rafaela	2–1	Alvarado

March 21, 2013	Lanús	1–0	UAI Urquiza

March 6, 2013	Deportivo Morón	2–1	Instituto

March 14, 2013	Ferro Carril Oeste	0–0 (5–6 p)	Defensores Unidos

March 20, 2013	Patronato	2–2 (9–10 p)	Tristán Suárez

March 25, 2013	Unión	1–1 (7–8 p)	Gimnasia y Esgrima (CdU)

== Final phase ==
The Final Phase will consist of the Round of 32, Round of 16, Quarterfinals, Semifinals, and the Final. Beginning in the Round of 32, the thirty-two qualified teams will be split into four groups. Each group will consist of eight Primera División teams, and twenty-four winners from the Final Phase. Each group will contest their matches in a specific location chosen by the organizing committee.

=== Upper bracket ===
Round of 32
River Plate	0
Estudiantes (BA)	1
Juventud Antoniana	0
Banfield	1
Talleres (C)	1 (5)
Sportivo Belgrano	1 (3)
Deportivo Armenio	1
Newell's Old Boys	2
Racing	0
Tristán Suárez	1
Gimnasia y Esgrima (CdU)	3
Defensores Unidos	0
Lanús	0
Atlético de Rafaela	1
Deportivo Morón	0 (2)
San Lorenzo	0 (3)

Round of 16
Estudiantes (BA)	1 (6)
Banfield	1 (5)
Talleres (C)	1
Newell's Old Boys	0
Tristán Suárez	0 (3)
Gimnasia y Esgrima (CdU)	0 (4)
Atlético de Rafaela	0
San Lorenzo	3

Quarterfinals
Estudiantes (BA)	1
Talleres (C)	0
Gimnasia y Esgrima (CdU)	0
San Lorenzo	2

Semifinals
Estudiantes (BA)	1 (4)
San Lorenzo	1 (5)

=== Lower bracket ===
Round of 32
Estudiantes (LP)	2
Atlético Tucumán	1
Unión (VK)	0
Quilmes	3
Central Córdoba (R)	0
All Boys	2
Excursionistas	0
Boca Juniors	4
Independiente	1 (4)
Boca Unidos	1 (2)
Platense	1
Arsenal	3
Huracán	0 (3)
Godoy Cruz	0 (5)
Olimpo	0 (4)
Vélez Sarsfield	0 (2)

Round of 16
Estudiantes (LP)	2
Quilmes	1
All Boys	3
Boca Juniors	1
Independiente	0
Arsenal	1
Godoy Cruz	3
Olimpo	2

Quarterfinals
Estudiantes (LP)	0
All Boys	1
Arsenal	1
Godoy Cruz	0

Semifinals
All Boys	1 (4)
Arsenal	1 (5)

== Final ==
October 16, 2013
20:10 UTC−3

San Lorenzo	0–3	Arsenal
	Report	Aguirre 36'; Echeverría 54'; Zelaya 66'

Estadio Bicentenario Ciudad de Catamarca, Catamarca
Referee: Germán Delfino

== Top goalscorers ==
Rank	Name	Nationality	Club	Goals
1	Daniel Bazán Vera	Argentine	Tristán Suárez	5
2	Damián Akerman	Argentine	Deportivo Morón	4
2	Joaquín Cabral	Argentine	Deportivo Roca	4
2	Ignacio Piatti	Argentine	San Lorenzo	4
2	Martín Prost	Argentine	CAI	4
2	Federico Rodríguez	Argentine	Berazategui	4
2	David Romero Neyra	Argentine	Américo Tesiorieri	4
2	Daniel Segovia	Argentine	Cruz del Sur	4
