= 2011–12 Torneo Argentino A =

XVII Torneo Argentino A
- Season: 2011–12
- Champions: Douglas Haig (1st divisional title)
- Promoted: Douglas Haig; Crucero del Norte
- Relegated: Unión (S); C.A.I. Huracán (TA)
- Top goalscorer: Juan Manuel Aróstegui (24 goals)

The 2011–12 Argentine Torneo Argentino A was the seventeenth season of third division professional football in Argentina. A total of 25 teams competed; the champion was promoted to Primera B Nacional.

== Club information ==
Locations of the 2011−12 season teams

=== North Zone ===
Club	City	Stadium
Alumni	Villa María	Manuel Ocampo
Central Córdoba	Santiago del Estero	Alfredo Terrara
Central Norte	Salta	Dr. Luis Güemes
Crucero del Norte	Garupá	Andrés Guacurarí
Gimnasia y Tiro	Salta	Gigante del Norte
Juventud Antoniana	Salta	Fray Honorato Pistoia
Libertad	Sunchales	Hogar de Los Tigres
Racing	Córdoba	Miguel Sancho
San Martín (T)	San Miguel de Tucumán	La Ciudadela
Sportivo Belgrano	San Francisco	Oscar Boero
Talleres	Córdoba	La Boutique
Tiro Federal	Rosario	Fortín de Ludueña
Unión	Sunchales	La Fortaleza

=== South Zone ===
Club	City	Stadium
CAI	Comodoro Rivadavia	Estadio Municipal
Cipolletti	Cipolletti	La Visera de Cemento
Defensores de Belgrano	Villa Ramallo	Salomón Boeseldín
Deportivo Maipú	Maipú	Higinio Sperdutti
Douglas Haig	Pergamino	Miguel Morales
Gimnasia y Esgrima	Concepción del Uruguay	Manuel y Ramón Núñez
Huracán	Tres Arroyos	Roberto Lorenzo Bottino
Juventud Unida Universitario	San Luis	Mario Diez
Racing	Olavarría	José Buglione
Rivadavia	Lincoln	El Coliseo
Santamarina	Tandil	Municipal Gral. San Martín
Unión	Mar del Plata	(None) ^{1}

^{1} Play their home games at Estadio José María Minella.

== First stage ==
=== North Zone ===
Pos	Team	Pld	W	D	L	GF	GA	GD	Pts	Qualification
1	Crucero del Norte	24	11	8	5	31	21	+10	41	Second Stage
2	San Martín (T)	24	8	13	3	27	21	+6	37	Second Stage
3	Sportivo Belgrano	24	10	7	7	32	27	+5	37	Second Stage
4	Talleres	24	8	11	5	35	31	+4	35	Second Stage
5	Racing (C)	24	10	4	10	29	28	+1	34	Second Stage
6	Central Córdoba (SdE)	24	7	11	6	21	20	+1	32	Second Stage
7	Tiro Federal	24	8	8	8	26	28	−2	32	Reválida Stage
8	Libertad (S)	24	7	10	7	30	25	+5	31	Reválida Stage
9	Central Norte	24	7	10	7	24	25	−1	31	Reválida Stage
10	Gimnasia y Tiro	24	8	7	9	27	30	−3	31	Reválida Stage
11	Juventud Antoniana	24	7	9	8	28	27	+1	30	Reválida Stage
12	Alumni (VM)	24	5	6	13	23	32	−9	21	Reválida Stage
13	Unión (S)	24	4	8	12	16	34	−18	20	Reválida Stage

Updated to match(es) played on March 13, 2012. Source: AFA
Rules for classification: 1st points; 2nd goal difference; 3rd goals scored; 4th head-to-head points; 5th head-to-head goal difference; 6th head-to-head goals scored. This does not apply to determining the champion. If two or more teams had been tied in point at the end of the tournament, a playoff would have been held at a neutral venue within 72 hours for the championship

=== South Zone ===
Pos	Team	Pld	W	D	L	GF	GA	GD	Pts	Qualification
1	Santamarina	22	9	11	2	37	20	+17	38	Second Stage
2	Defensores de Belgrano (VR)	22	10	6	6	35	25	+10	36	Second Stage
3	Douglas Haig	22	10	5	7	33	20	+13	35	Second Stage
4	Racing (O)	22	10	4	8	21	18	+3	34	Second Stage
5	Unión (MdP)	22	9	5	8	27	26	+1	32	Second Stage
6	Deportivo Maipú	22	8	7	7	21	21	0	31	Reválida Stage
7	Huracán (TA)	22	7	7	8	22	27	−5	28	Reválida Stage
8	Cipolletti	22	7	5	10	29	35	−6	26	Reválida Stage
9	Gimnasia y Esgrima (CdU)	22	6	7	9	20	27	−7	25	Reválida Stage
10	Rivadavia (L)	22	6	6	10	25	31	−6	24	Reválida Stage
11	Juventud Unida Universitario	22	5	8	9	23	29	−6	23	Reválida Stage
12	CAI	22	4	9	9	22	37	−15	21	Reválida Stage

Updated to match(es) played on 13 March 2012. Source: AFA
Rules for classification: 1st points; 2nd goal difference; 3rd goals scored; 4th head-to-head points; 5th head-to-head goal difference; 6th head-to-head goals scored. This does not apply to determining the champion. If two or more teams had been tied in point at the end of the tournament, a playoff would have been held at a neutral venue within 72 hours for the championship

== Second stage ==
Pos	Team	Pld	W	D	L	GF	GA	GD	Pts	Qualification
1	Douglas Haig (C, P)	10	6	3	1	19	9	+10	21	Primera B Nacional
2	Sportivo Belgrano	10	6	2	2	18	10	+8	20	Fourth Stage
3	Crucero del Norte	10	6	2	2	11	3	+8	20	Fourth Stage
4	Talleres	10	4	4	2	20	11	+9	16	Fourth Stage
5	Santamarina	10	4	2	4	12	10	+2	14	Fourth Stage
6	San Martín (T)	10	4	2	4	10	13	−3	14	Third Stage
7	Defensores de Belgrano (VR)	10	2	4	4	8	10	−2	10	Third Stage
8	Racing (O)	10	3	1	6	9	17	−8	10	Third Stage
9	Unión (MdP)	10	2	3	5	7	13	−6	9	Third Stage
10	Racing (C)	10	1	5	4	10	16	−6	8	Third Stage
11	Central Córdoba (SdE)	10	2	2	6	8	20	−12	8	Third Stage

Updated to match(es) played on 23 May 2012. Source: AFA
Rules for classification: 1st points; 2nd goal difference; 3rd goals scored; 4th head-to-head points; 5th head-to-head goal difference; 6th head-to-head goals scored. This does not apply to determining the champion. If two or more teams had been tied in point at the end of the tournament, a playoff would have been held at a neutral venue within 72 hours for the championship
(C) Champions; (P) Promoted

== Reválida Stage ==
=== Zone A ===
Pos	Team	Pld	W	D	L	GF	GA	GD	Pts	Qualification
1	Libertad (S)	6	4	1	1	10	5	+5	13	Second round
2	Central Norte	6	3	0	3	7	8	−1	9	Second round
3	Unión (S)	6	2	2	2	7	7	0	8	
4	Gimnasia y Tiro	6	2	2	2	6	6	0	8	Second round
5	Alumni (VM)	6	2	2	2	10	11	−1	8	
6	Juventud Antoniana	6	2	2	2	7	9	−2	8	Second round
7	Tiro Federal	6	1	1	4	6	7	−1	4	

Unión de Sunchales and Alumni de Villa María were ineligible for the Second round because they were involved in relegation.

==== Overall standings ====
The overall standings for the seven teams of Zone A include the regular season and the first round of the Reválida. The bottom team relegates to the Torneo Argentino B, while the next-to-last team plays the relegation play-off with a team from such category. Those two teams cannot qualify for the second round of the Reválida.

Pos	Team	Pld	W	D	L	GF	GA	GD	Pts	Qualification or relegation
1	Libertad (S)	30	11	11	8	40	30	+10	44	
2	Central Norte	30	10	10	10	31	33	−2	40	
3	Gimnasia y Tiro	30	10	9	11	33	36	−3	39	
4	Juventud Antoniana	30	9	11	10	35	36	−1	38	
5	Tiro Federal	30	9	9	12	32	35	−3	36	
6	Alumni (VM)	30	7	8	15	35	45	−10	29	Torneo Argentino B relegation play-off
7	Unión (S)	30	6	10	14	23	41	−18	28	Torneo Argentino B

=== Zone B ===
Pos	Team	Pld	W	D	L	GF	GA	GD	Pts	Qualification
1	CAI	6	3	3	0	9	4	+5	12	
2	Juventud Unida Universitario	6	3	2	1	6	4	+2	11	Second round
3	Rivadavia (L)	6	3	1	2	7	4	+3	10	Second round
4	Gimnasia y Esgrima (CdU)	6	2	3	1	6	5	+1	9	Second round
5	Cipolletti	6	2	2	2	7	6	+1	8	Second round
6	Deportivo Maipú	6	1	1	4	3	6	−3	4	
7	Huracán (TA)	6	0	2	4	0	9	−9	2	

CAI was ineligible for the Second round, as it was involved in relegation.

==== Overall standings ====
The overall standings for the seven teams of Zone B include the regular season and the first round of the Reválida. The bottom team relegates to the Torneo Argentino B, while the next-to-last team plays the relegation play-off with a team from such category. Those two teams cannot qualify for the second round of the Reválida.

Pos	Team	Pld	W	D	L	GF	GA	GD	Pts	Qualification or relegation
1	Deportivo Maipú	28	9	8	11	24	27	−3	35	
2	Rivadavia (L)	28	9	7	12	32	35	−3	34	
3	Juventud Unida Universitario	28	8	10	10	29	33	−4	34	
4	Cipolletti	28	9	7	12	36	41	−5	34	
5	Gimnasia y Esgrima (CdU)	28	8	10	10	26	32	−6	34	
6	CAI	28	7	12	9	31	41	−10	33	Torneo Argentino B relegation play-off
7	Huracán (TA)	28	7	9	12	22	36	−14	30	Torneo Argentino B

=== Second round ===
Team 1	Agg.	Team 2	1st leg	2nd leg
Cipolletti	2–4	Libertad (S)	0–2	2–2
Gimnasia (CdU)	1–3	Central Norte	0–0	1–3
Gimnasia y Tiro	0–3	Rivadavia (L)	0–1	0–2
Juventud Antoniana	1–1	Juventud Unida Universitario	1–1	0–0

=== Semifinals ===
Team 1	Agg.	Team 2	1st leg	2nd leg
Central Norte	3–1	Libertad (S)	2–0	1–1
Juventud Unida Universitario	3–1	Rivadavia (L)	0–1	3–0

== Third stage ==
The Third Stage includes the two teams qualified from the Second Stage of the Reválida, plus the six teams directly qualified to the Third Stage of the Reválida from the Second Stage of the regular season.

Team 1	Agg.	Team 2	1st leg	2nd leg
Central Norte	4–1	San Martín (T)	2–0	2–1
Juventud Unida Universitario	4–3	Defensores de Belgrano (VR)	4–1	0–2
Central Córdoba (SdE)	3–3	Racing (O)	2–0	1–3
Racing (C)	3–1	Unión (MdP)	1–1	2–0

== Fourth stage ==
The Fourth Stage is played by the four winners of the Third Stage of the Reválida, plus the four teams that qualified directly to the Fourth Stage of the Reválida from the Second Stage of the regular season.

Team 1	Agg.	Team 2	1st leg	2nd leg
Racing (O)	4–4	Santamarina	2–2	2–2
Racing (C)	2–2	Talleres (C)	1–1	1–1
Juventud Unida Universitario	1–3	Crucero del Norte	0–1	1–2
Central Norte	4–4	Sportivo Belgrano	3–2	1–2

== Fifth stage ==
The Fifth Stage is played by the four winners of the Fourth Stage.

Team 1	Agg.	Team 2	1st leg	2nd leg
Talleres (C)	1–2	Crucero del Norte	0–0	1–2
Santamarina	0–4	Sportivo Belgrano	0–1	0–3

== Sixth stage ==
The Sixth Stage is played by the two winners of the Fifth Stage.

Team 1	Agg.	Team 2	1st leg	2nd leg
Sportivo Belgrano	1–3	Crucero del Norte	1–3	0–0

== Promotion/relegation playoff Torneo Argentino A-B Nacional ==
Team 1	Agg.	Team 2	1st leg	2nd leg
Crucero del Norte	1–0	Guillermo Brown	0–0	1–0

- Crucero del Norte was promoted to 2012–13 Primera B Nacional by winning the playoff and Guillermo Brown was relegated to 2012–13 Torneo Argentino A

== Promotion/relegation playoffs Torneo Argentino A-Torneo Argentino B ==
Team 1	Agg.	Team 2	1st leg	2nd leg
Deportivo Roca	3–3	Alumni (VM)	2–2	1–1
San Jorge (T)	3–2	CAI	0–1	3–1

- Alumni remained in the Torneo Argentino A by drawing the playoff.
- San Jorge (T) was promoted to 2012–13 Torneo Argentino A by winning the playoff and CAI was relegated to 2012–13 Torneo Argentino B

== See also ==
- 2011–12 in Argentine football
