= 2012–13 Torneo Argentino A =

XVIII Torneo Argentino A
- Season: 2012–13
- Champions: Talleres (C) (1st divisional title)
- Promoted: Talleres (C); Sportivo Belgrano
- Relegated: Racing (C); Alumni (VM); Desamparados
- Top goalscorer: Gonzalo Klusener (25 goals)

The 2012–13 Argentine Torneo Argentino A was the eighteenth season of third division professional football in Argentina. A total of 25 teams competed; the champion was promoted to Primera B Nacional.

== Club information ==
Locations of the 2011−12 season teams

=== North Zone ===
Club	City	Stadium
Alumni	Villa María	Manuel Ocampo
Central Córdoba	Santiago del Estero	Alfredo Terrara
Central Norte	Salta	Dr. Luis Güemes
Gimnasia y Tiro	Salta	Gigante del Norte
Guaraní Antonio Franco	Posadas	Clemente F. de Oliveira
Juventud Antoniana	Salta	Fray Honorato Pistoia
Libertad	Sunchales	Hogar de Los Tigres
Racing	Córdoba	Miguel Sancho
San Jorge	San Miguel de Tucumán	Senador Luis Cruz
San Martín	San Miguel de Tucumán	La Ciudadela
Sportivo Belgrano	San Francisco	Oscar Boero
Talleres	Córdoba	La Boutique
Tiro Federal	Rosario	Fortín de Ludueña

=== South Zone ===
Club	City	Stadium
Alvarado	Mar del Plata	(None) ^{1}
Cipolletti	Cipolletti	La Visera de Cemento
Defensores de Belgrano	Villa Ramallo	Salomón Boeseldín
Deportivo Maipú	Maipú	Higinio Sperdutti
Desamparados	San Juan	El Serpentario
Gimnasia y Esgrima	Concepción del Uruguay	Manuel y Ramón Núñez
Guillermo Brown	Puerto Madryn	Raul Conti
Juventud Unida Universitario	San Luis	Mario Diez
Racing	Olavarría	José Buglione
Rivadavia	Lincoln	El Coliseo
Santamarina	Tandil	Municipal Gral. San Martín
Unión	Mar del Plata	(None) ^{1}

^{1} Play their home games at Estadio José María Minella.

== First stage ==
=== North Zone ===
Pos	Team	Pld	W	D	L	GF	GA	GD	Pts	Qualification
1	Talleres (C)	24	13	7	4	42	23	+19	46	Second Stage
2	Gimnasia y Tiro	24	13	3	8	36	26	+10	42	Second Stage
3	San Martín (T)	24	9	10	5	29	22	+7	37	Second Stage
4	Sportivo Belgrano	24	10	6	8	37	28	+9	36	Second Stage
5	San Jorge (T)	24	9	9	6	25	35	−10	36	Second Stage
6	Juventud Antoniana	24	9	8	7	20	18	+2	35	Second Stage
7	Central Norte	24	9	6	9	33	29	+4	33	Reválida Stage
8	Central Córdoba (SdE)	24	8	9	7	32	28	+4	33	Reválida Stage
9	Libertad (S)	24	6	11	7	23	28	−5	29	Reválida Stage
10	Tiro Federal	24	6	9	9	20	25	−5	27	Reválida Stage
11	Guaraní Antonio Franco	24	4	11	9	24	29	−5	23	Reválida Stage
12	Alumni (VM)	24	4	8	12	17	29	−12	20	Reválida Stage
13	Racing (C)	24	3	9	12	18	36	−18	18	Reválida Stage

Updated to match(es) played on March 2012. Source: AFA
Rules for classification: 1st points; 2nd goal difference; 3rd goals scored; 4th head-to-head points; 5th head-to-head goal difference; 6th head-to-head goals scored. This does not apply to determining the champion. If two or more teams had been tied in point at the end of the tournament, a playoff would have been held at a neutral venue within 72 hours for the championship

=== South Zone ===
Pos	Team	Pld	W	D	L	GF	GA	GD	Pts	Qualification
1	Santamarina	22	11	6	5	30	19	+11	39	Second Stage
2	Juventud Unida Universitario	22	9	8	5	27	23	+4	35	Second Stage
3	Deportivo Maipú	22	9	6	7	32	29	+3	33	Second Stage
4	Racing (O)	22	9	3	10	33	28	+5	30	Second Stage
5	Gimnasia y Esgrima (CdU)	22	8	6	8	26	27	−1	30	Second Stage
6	Defensores de Belgrano (VR)	22	8	6	8	19	22	−3	30	Reválida Stage
7	Rivadavia (L)	22	8	5	9	32	36	−4	29	Reválida Stage
8	Cipolletti	22	9	1	12	27	26	+1	28	Reválida Stage
9	Alvarado	22	8	4	10	20	21	−1	28	Reválida Stage
10	Unión (MdP)	22	7	7	8	24	30	−6	28	Reválida Stage
11	Guillermo Brown	22	7	6	9	25	32	−7	27	Reválida Stage
12	Desamparados	22	5	10	7	26	28	−2	25	Reválida Stage

Updated to match(es) played on March 2013. Source: AFA
Rules for classification: 1st points; 2nd goal difference; 3rd goals scored; 4th head-to-head points; 5th head-to-head goal difference; 6th head-to-head goals scored. This does not apply to determining the champion. If two or more teams had been tied in point at the end of the tournament, a playoff would have been held at a neutral venue within 72 hours for the championship

== Second Stage ==
Pos	Team	Pld	W	D	L	GF	GA	GD	Pts	Qualification
1	Talleres (C) (C, P)	10	7	3	0	15	6	+9	24	Primera B Nacional
2	Sportivo Belgrano	10	6	2	2	19	13	+6	20	Fourth Stage
3	Santamarina	10	5	2	3	16	11	+5	17	Fourth Stage
4	Deportivo Maipú	10	4	4	2	11	7	+4	16	Fourth Stage
5	San Jorge (T)	10	4	2	4	21	19	+2	14	Fourth Stage
6	San Martín (T)	10	4	2	4	7	8	−1	14	Third Stage
7	Gimnasia y Tiro	10	3	4	3	15	14	+1	13	Third Stage
8	Racing (O)	10	3	2	5	13	15	−2	11	Third Stage
9	Juventud Unida Universitario	10	2	3	5	14	21	−7	9	Third Stage
10	Juventud Antoniana	10	1	5	4	10	13	−3	8	Third Stage
11	Gimnasia y Esgrima (CdU)	10	0	3	7	6	20	−14	3	Third Stage

Updated to match(es) played on May 2013. Source: AFA
Rules for classification: 1st points; 2nd goal difference; 3rd goals scored; 4th head-to-head points; 5th head-to-head goal difference; 6th head-to-head goals scored. This does not apply to determining the champion. If two or more teams had been tied in point at the end of the tournament, a playoff would have been held at a neutral venue within 72 hours for the championship
(C) Champions; (P) Promoted

== Reválida Stage ==
=== Zone A ===
Pos	Team	Pld	W	D	L	GF	GA	GD	Pts	Qualification
1	Central Córdoba (SdE)	6	3	3	0	9	4	+5	12	Second round
2	Guaraní Antonio Franco	6	3	3	0	8	4	+4	12	Second round
3	Racing (C)	6	2	2	2	8	4	+4	8	
4	Tiro Federal	6	1	4	1	6	7	−1	7	Second round
5	Libertad (S)	6	1	3	2	3	5	−2	6	Second round
6	Alumni (VM)	6	2	0	4	4	10	−6	6	
7	Central Norte	6	1	1	4	5	9	−4	4	

Racing (C) was ineligible for the Second Round, as it was involved in relegation.

==== Overall standings ====
The overall standings for the seven teams of Zone A include the regular season and the first round of the Reválida. The bottom team relegates to the Torneo Argentino B, while the next-to-last team plays the relegation play-off with a team from such category. Those two teams cannot qualify for the second round of the Reválida.

Pos	Team	Pld	W	D	L	GF	GA	GD	Pts	Qualification or relegation
1	Central Córdoba (SdE)	30	11	12	7	41	32	+9	45	
2	Central Norte	30	10	7	13	38	38	0	37	
3	Guaraní Antonio Franco	30	7	14	9	32	33	−1	35	
4	Libertad (S)	30	7	14	9	26	33	−7	35	
5	Tiro Federal	30	7	13	10	26	32	−6	34	
6	Alumni (VM)	30	6	8	16	21	39	−18	26	Torneo Argentino B relegation play-off
7	Racing (C)	30	5	11	14	26	40	−14	26	Torneo Argentino B

===== Tiebreaker =====
Team 1	Score	Team 2
Racing (C)	0–0 (4–5 p)	Alumni (VM)

=== Zone B ===
Pos	Team	Pld	W	D	L	GF	GA	GD	Pts	Qualification
1	Alvarado	6	4	0	2	9	8	+1	12	Second round
2	Unión (MdP)	6	3	1	2	9	9	0	10	Second round
3	Rivadavia (L)	6	2	3	1	9	6	+3	9	Second round
4	Defensores de Belgrano (VR)	6	2	3	1	7	6	+1	9	Second round
5	Cipolletti	6	2	2	2	10	8	+2	8	
6	Guillermo Brown	6	1	2	3	6	9	−3	5	
7	Desamparados	6	1	1	4	5	9	−4	4	

==== Overall standings ====
The overall standings for the seven teams of Zone B include the regular season and the first round of the Reválida. The bottom team relegates to the Torneo Argentino B, while the next-to-last team plays the relegation play-off with a team from such category. Those two teams cannot qualify for the second round of the Reválida.

Pos	Team	Pld	W	D	L	GF	GA	GD	Pts	Qualification
1	Alvarado	28	12	4	12	29	29	0	40	
2	Defensores de Belgrano (VR)	28	10	9	9	26	28	−2	39	
3	Unión (MdP)	28	10	8	10	33	39	−6	38	
4	Rivadavia (L)	28	10	8	10	41	42	−1	38	
5	Cipolletti	28	11	3	14	37	34	+3	36	
6	Guillermo Brown	28	8	8	12	31	42	−11	32	Torneo Argentino B relegation play-off
7	Desamparados	28	6	11	11	30	37	−7	29	Torneo Argentino B

==== Torneo Argentino B relegation play-off ====
Team 1	Score	Team 2
Alumni (VM)	1–2	Guillermo Brown

=== Second round ===
Team 1	Agg.	Team 2	1st leg	2nd leg
Central Córdoba (SdE)	3–4	Libertad (S)	1–2	2–2
Guaraní Antonio Franco	4–1	Tiro Federal	0–1	4–0
Alvarado	4–1	Defensores de Belgrano (VR)	0–1	4–0
Unión (MdP)	3–5	Rivadavia (L)	2–1	1–4

=== Third round ===
Team 1	Agg.	Team 2	1st leg	2nd leg
Guaraní Antonio Franco	2–3	Libertad (S)	0–3	2–0
Alvarado	1–3	Rivadavia (L)	0–2	1–1

== Third Stage ==
Team 1	Agg.	Team 2	1st leg	2nd leg
San Martín (T)	2 –2	Libertad (S)	1–1	1–1
Gimnasia y Tiro	4–1	Rivadavia (L)	1–0	3–1
Racing (O)	2–2	Gimnasia y Esgrima (CdU)	1–1	1–1
Juventud Unida Universitario	1–2	Juventud Antoniana	0–2	1–0

== Fourth Stage ==
Team 1	Agg.	Team 2	1st leg	2nd leg
Sportivo Belgrano	5 –2	Juventud Antoniana	1–1	4–1
Santamarina	3–2	Racing (O)	0–1	3–1
Deportivo Maipú	3–3	Gimnasia y Tiro	1–3	2–0
San Jorge (T)	3–6	San Martín (T)	2–3	1–3

== Fifth Stage ==
Team 1	Agg.	Team 2	1st leg	2nd leg
Sportivo Belgrano	4–2	San Martín (T)	2–0	2–2
Santamarina	4–3	Deportivo Maipú	0–2	4–1

== Sixth Stage ==
Team 1	Agg.	Team 2	1st leg	2nd leg
Sportivo Belgrano	1–1	Santamarina	0–0	1–1

== See also ==
- 2012–13 in Argentine football
