= Augusto Álvarez =

Argentine footballer

Personal information
- Full name: Augusto Tomás Álvarez
- Date of birth: 1 August 1984 (age 42)
- Place of birth: Santa Fe, Argentina
- Height: 1.84 m (6 ft 0 in)
- Position: Defender

Senior career*
Years	Team	Apps	(Gls)
2005	Colón		
2005–2010	Gimnasia CdU	92	(4)
2010–2012	Desamparados	72	(3)
2012	San Lorenzo	3	(0)
2013	Douglas Haig	10	(0)
2013	Gimnasia CdU	18	(0)
2014	Almirante Brown	15	(0)
2014	Sol de América Formosa	5	(0)
2015	Cobresal	3	(0)
2015	León de Huánuco	5	(0)
2016	Sportivo Peñarol	9	(0)
2016–2017	Unión Villa Krause	18	(0)
2017–2018	Unión de Sunchales	23	(0)
2018–2019	Sportivo Las Parejas	1	(0)
2022–2023	Náutico El Quillá	8	(0)
Medal record
First place	Chilean Primera División	2015
- * Club domestic league appearances and goals

Augusto Tomás Álvarez (born 1 August 1984) is an Argentine former footballer who played for teams in Chile and Peru as well as in his native Argentina.

== Teams ==
- (Argentina) Colón 2005
- (Argentina) Gimnasia y Esgrima de Concepción del Uruguay 2005–2010
- (Argentina) Desamparados 2010–2012
- (Argentina) San Lorenzo 2012
- (Argentina) Douglas Haig 2013
- (Argentina) Gimnasia y Esgrima de Concepción del Uruguay 2013
- (Argentina) Almirante Brown 2014
- (Argentina) Sol de América de Formosa 2014
- (Chile) Cobresal 2015
- (Peru) León de Huánuco 2015
- (Argentina) Sportivo Peñarol 2016
- (Argentina) Unión Villa Krause 2016–2017
- (Argentina) Unión de Sunchales 2017–2018
- (Argentina) Sportivo Las Parejas 2018–2019
- (Argentina) Náutico El Quillá 2022–2023

== Titles ==
- Cobresal 2015 (Chilean First División Championship)
