= Torneo Federal B =

- Organising body: Argentine Football Association
- Founded: 2014
- Folded: 2017
- Country: Argentina
- Confederation: CONMEBOL
- Level on pyramid: 4
- Promotion to: Torneo Federal A
- Relegation to: Torneo Federal C
- Domestic cup: Copa Argentina
- Website: Official webpage

Torneo Federal B was one of two leagues that form the fourth level of the Argentine football league system, made up of 100+ teams playing within eight regional zones across Argentina.

The other league at level four was – and still is – the Primera C Metropolitana, which is a competition for the numerous clubs in the city of Buenos Aires and the Greater Buenos Aires metropolitan area.

The Torneo Federal B was replaced with the similar Torneo Regional Federal Amateur for the 2019 season), while the Primera C continued on as its tier four companion for the Buenos Aires area.

== List of champions ==
Season	Champions	Also Promoted
2014 Transición	9 de Julio (M); Concepción FC; Gutiérrez; Sportivo Las Parejas; Tiro Federal (BB); Unión (S); Vélez Sarsfield (SR)	—
2015 Federal B	Defensores de Pronunciamiento; Güemes; Villa Mitre	—
2016 Transición	Desamparados; Rivadavia (L)	Agropecuario Argentino
2016 Federal B Complementario	Estudiantes (RC); Huracán Las Heras; Sansinena; Textil Mandiyú	—
2017 Federal B	Camioneros; Racing (C); San Martín (F); Sol de Mayo (Viedma)	—

== See also ==
- Argentine football league system
- List of football clubs in Argentina
