= Cristián Verón =

Argentine footballer

Personal information
- Full name: Cristián Verón
- Date of birth: July 14, 1979 (age 47)
- Place of birth: Argentina
- Position: Defender

Senior career*
Years	Team	Apps	(Gls)
1997–2002	Platense		
2002–2003	El Porvenir		
2003–2004	Gimnasia y Esgrima de Concepción del Uruguay		
2004–2006	San Martín de San Juan		
2007–2008	Deportes La Serena		
- * Club domestic league appearances and goals

Cristián Verón (born 14 July 1979) is an Argentine former professional footballer who played as a defender.

== Career ==
- Platense 1997–2002
- El Porvenir 2002–2003
- Gimnasia y Esgrima de Concepción del Uruguay 2003–2004
- San Martín de San Juan 2004–2006
- Deportes La Serena 2007–2008
