= Sunchales Aeroclub Airport =

Airport in Argentina

- IATA: NCJ; ICAO: SAFS

Summary
- Airport type: Public
- Serves: Sunchales, Argentina
- Elevation AMSL: 311 ft / 95 m
- Coordinates: 30°57′25″S 61°31′45″W

Map
- Airport location in Argentina

Runways
Direction	Length		Surface
Direction	m	ft	Surface
11/29	2,000	6,562	Concrete/asphalt
- Sources: GCM, Google Maps

Sunchales Aeroclub Airport (IATA: NCJ, ICAO: SAFS) is an airport serving the town of Sunchales in the Santa Fe Province of Argentina. The airport is 1 kilometre (0.6 mi) southeast of the town.

Runway length includes a 230 metres (750 ft) displaced threshold on Runway 11. The Ceres VOR-DME (Ident: ERE) is located 68.0 nautical miles (126 km) north-northwest of the airport.

== Airlines and destinations ==
No scheduled flights operate at this airport.

== See also ==
- Transport in Argentina
- List of airports in Argentina
