= Juventud de Pergamino =

Argentine football club

Juventud
- Full name: Club Atlético Juventud
- Nicknames: Celeste, La Juve, Inundados, La Ribiera, La Juventus de Pergamino
- Founded: 13 July 1946
- Ground: Estadio José F."Pepe" Raymundi; Pergamino, Buenos Aires, Argentina
- Capacity: 3,200
- League: Torneo Argentino A
- 2008–09: 1st stage 6th place (zone 1)
Home colours	Away colours

Club Atlético Juventud (usually referred as Juventud de Pergamino) is a football club from Pergamino in Buenos Aires Province, Argentina. The team currently plays in Torneo Argentino A, which is the regionalised third tier of the Argentine Football Association league system.

== Titles ==
- Liga de Pergamino: 6

1973, 1974, 1975, 1977, 2003, Clausura 2004

== See also ==
- List of football clubs in Argentina
- Argentine football league system
