= Real Arroyo Seco =

Argentine football club

- Full name: Club Social y Deportivo Real Arroyo Seco
- Nickname(s): Real
- Founded: January 6, 2004
- Dissolved: 2010
- Ground: Estadio Real Arroyo Seco, Santa Fe; Santa Fe, Argentina
- Capacity: 20,000
- League: Torneo Argentino A
- 2008–09: 1st stage 8th place (zone 2); Relegated to Argentino B
Home colours	Away colours

Real Arroyo Seco (2004–10) was a football club from Arroyo Seco in Santa Fe, Argentina that played in Torneo Argentino B, the regionalised fourth tier of the Argentine Football Association league system.

The club was founded in 2004, making them one of the youngest football teams in Argentina. They were promoted from Torneo Argentino B at the end of the 2005–06 season after beating Club Atlético Candelaria 4–2 on aggregate in a promotion/relegation playoff. At the end of the 2008–09 season the club were automatically relegated back to Argentino B. At the end of the 2009-2010 season, after being relegated for the second consecutive season, the club was dissolved.

The club won five titles during its tenure: Liga Regional del Sud in 2004, 2005, 2006 and 2007 and Torneo del Interior in 2005.

== See also ==
- List of football clubs in Argentina
- Argentine football league system
