= La Plata Fútbol Club =

Argentine football club

La Plata
- Full name: La Plata Fútbol Club
- Nickname(s): Tigre
- Founded: November 19, 2000; 24 years ago
- Ground: Gobernador Mercante, La Plata
- Capacity: 5,500
- League: Torneo Argentino A
- 2007–08: 9° Group C (Relegated to Argentino B)
Home colours	Away colours

La Plata Fútbol Club is an Argentine football club from the city of La Plata in Buenos Aires Province. The team currently in Liga Amateur Platense, a regional league of club's city of origin.

== History ==
The club was founded in 2000, making it one of the youngest institutions in Argentine football. In past years, La Plata played in Torneo Argentino A, the defunct tournament that was the third level of the Argentine football league system by then.

Club's stadium is Estadio Gobernador Mercante which has a capacity of 5,500, but La Plata used to play most of its home games in the much larger Estadio Ciudad de La Plata –which has a capacity of 45,000– when the team competed in tournaments organised by AFA.

La Plata FC was heavily supported by then-mayor of La Plata, Julio Alak. In 2008, three months after Alak's departure from office, it was announced that the club would disappear because of the merging to another institution, Asociación Arco Iris. although La Plata still exists nowadays.
