= Hogar de los Tigres =

Hogar de los Tigres (English: the Tigers' lair) is an indoor arena that is located in Sunchales, Santa Fe Province, Argentina. It is primarily used for basketball, and is the home arena of Libertad de Sunchales (nicknamed los Tigres). It holds 4,200 people.

== History ==
The arena underwent building upgrades during 2010, and it is one of the few indoor arenas in Argentina that has air conditioning.
