= Defensores de Belgrano de Villa Ramallo =

Argentine sports club

Defensores de Belgrano
- Full name: Club Atlético y Social Defensores de Belgrano
- Nicknames: Granate; Elefante
- Founded: 1 April 1946; 79 years ago
- Ground: Salomón Boeseldín, Ramallo Partido, Buenos Aires Province
- Capacity: 3,000
- Chairman: José Luis Torreani
- Manager: Gabriel Gomez & Hector Storti
- League: Torneo Argentino A
- 2011–12: 7th
- Website: http://www.webgranate.com.ar/
Home colours	Away colours

Club Atlético y Social Defensores de Belgrano, mostly known as Defensores de Belgrano de Villa Ramallo, is an Argentine sports club located in the Ramallo Partido of Buenos Aires Province. The football team currently plays in the Torneo Argentino A, the regionalised third division of Argentine football league system.

Other sports practiced by the sports club are basketball, field hockey, gymnastics, handball, roller skating, swimming, tennis, and volleyball.

== History ==
It was founded on 1 April 1946,5 with Miguel Petruzzi as the club's first president. The club's official name comes from a school and a square that were named Belgrano.

Initially they wore the colours of Vélez Sarsfield, but in 1950, they wore maroon at the suggestion of Pete González in homage to Club Atlético Lanús, and adopted the current crest.

The team's crest is maroon and white. It has the club's initials at the top in white and an elephant in the centre, signifying "strength and might, according to the club's founders".

== Basketball ==
The club has had a notable under 13 category with players that made history for the club. DT:Martín Blanco. Players: Torriani Martín, Leguizamo Martín, Filanti Aseff Joaquín, Passciulo Vito, Tomatis Facundo, Gonzales Francisco, Rossi Francisco, Sangasis Rueda, Juan Ignacio, Costoya Mauricio, Sica Amadeo, Sica Santino, Martínez Máximo. Surprisingly, the team reached the final four of the 2019 ABSN (Saint Nicholas Basketball Association) Gold Cup losing in the final against Regatas de San Nicolas with a score of 63-39 and thereby winning second place in the league. They also succeeded in qualifying for the first time in history at the junior club zone level for the north zone of BS. AS category.

On that same campus, eight players were preselected for the team: they were Torriani Martín, Rossi Francisco, Leguizamo Martín, Tomatis Facundo, Gonzales Francisco, Filanti Aseff Joaquín, Passciulo Vito, Sica Santino, of which only two players were selected in the end (Torriani Martín y Rossi Francisco) for the north zone BS. AS in which they remained second in the triangular competition winning against Pergamino by 70-63 and losing to Zerate-Campana by 57-58 that classified the provincial team.
