= Club Social y Deportivo La Florida =

Argentine football club

La Florida
- Full name: Club Social y Deportivo La Florida
- Nickname(s): Gaucho, Tricolor
- Founded: 17 December 1917; 107 years ago
- Ground: Capitán Jaime Solá, La Florida y Luisiana, Tucumán Province
- League: Liga Tucumana de Fútbol
Home colours

Club Social y Deportivo La Florida, mostly known as La Florida is an Argentine football club from La Florida y Luisiana in Tucumán Province. The team currently plays in the regional competition of the Province, the Liga Tucumana de Fútbol.

== Titles ==
- Torneo Argentino B (1): 2002–03.
- Liga Tucumana de Fútbol (2): 2002, 2014.
