= Club Villa Mitre =

Sports club in Argentina

Villa Mitre
- Full name: Club Villa Mitre
- Nickname(s): Villeros; Tricolor
- Founded: 14 August 1924; 101 years ago
- Ground: El Fortín
- Capacity: 6,000
- League: Torneo Federal A
- 2023: 1/4 Torneo Federal A
- Website: http://www.villamitre.com.ar/
Home colours	Away colours

Club Villa Mitre, is a sports club based in the city of Bahía Blanca, Buenos Aires Province, Argentina. Although many sports are practised at the club, Villa Mitre is mostly known for its football team which currently plays in the Torneo Federal A, the regionalised Third division of the Argentine football league system. The club was named in commemoration of Bartolomé Mitre, President of Argentina between 1862 and 1868.

== Foundation ==
In 1922, a group of enthusiasts founded the club Marcelo T. de Alvear. They played football with a red, white and black shirt (similar to Chacarita's shirt). His first field was propriety of the Colegio Salesiano San Gabriel. The Reverend Tito Graziani gave the field with the condition that the players entered into church all Sundays. But one day they found that the field located between Catón (Agustín de Arrieta), 14 de Julio, Rivadavia and 12 de Octubre (Alberdi) streets was closed because the youth had not attended church and the Father decided to punish them, forcing the dissolution of the team.

On August 14, 1924, the boys turned to reunite, forming the Club Villa Mitre. The first meetings were at Miguel Ise's (one of the founders) home, with Cayetano Apilli, Segundo Piñeiro, Eduardo Cela, Manuel Luque, Emilio Roer, Héctor Castellano, Santos Mordibucci, Vicente Otero, José Casajuana, Vicente Iglesias, Tomas Troncoso, Domingo Gullacci, Tersilio Costa, Ricardo Valli, Manuel Otero, José García, Fernando Cela, Acrata Cuervo, Ramón Mielgo, Marcelo Rodríguez, Pedro Genchi, Argido Robledo, Valerio Spegardi, Marcos Fenoglio, Santiago Pedrocchi, Antonio Estévez, Miguel Pi, Víctor Lombardi, Marcos del Río, Juan Cuadrado, Ángel Genchi, Arturo Mongrovejo, Cayo Iglesias, Feliz Muñoz, Osiris Troncoso and Enrique Chitolini. These 37 young people were the founding members in the steering committee meeting, where Vicente Otero was established as the first president of the institution.

== Football campaigns ==
After some friendly matches, in 1925 Villa Mitre joined Liga del Sur having its first field in Rivadavia and Parera streets. On October 2, 1927 it was promoted to the first division of the league, winning against Rosario Puerto Belgrano 2–1, with Eloy de Robles as coach. But the promotion didn't materialize that year, because Rosario protested for a match and gave it these points. Then, the team of Punta Alta was declared “the new and authentic champion”. The Liga del Sur want to ascend both teams, but Soraiz, the Villa Mitre's president, said that his club will enter to first division for the front door and rejected the linguistic offer. Finally, Villa Mitre obtains the championship in 1929, and starts in first division next year playing a match with Club Dublin. In this first participation, the "tricolor" finished second.

With the start in the professionalism came the problems and the situation was difficult, because Villa Mitre lost some players and positions in the table. But they managed to recover and obtain the Copa Competencia. 10 years after its debut in the first division Villa Mitre earned his first title. In 1940 they were the undisputed champions.

Historically, Villa Mitre had two great periods of success: In 1944 the "tricolor" won everything: Local Championships brightly and, later, were provincial champions, losing only to Newell's Old Boys from Rosario. Villa Mitre were champions in the years 1945 and 1946 of the Liga del Sur tournaments, the last, undefeated. The second period of glory began after 1991, winning the title this year and getting a string of championships, which lasted until 1995. From there, Villa Mitre began its participation in regional tournaments in the Interior. In those years, the teams of Bahía Blanca were prestigious; because it, the AFA gave to them a place in the Primera B Nacional. For this, it was decided play finals between Olimpo and Villa Mitre, to the best of three. But the “Tricolor” didn't earn their place in the second tier of Argentine football until 1999, when defeated Douglas Haig from Pergamino, in Tandil, for 3–1. It was held at Primera B Nacional a few years but in 2002, after the refurbishment of the tournament, Villa Mitre down to Torneo Argentino A. On May 28, 2006, Villa Mitre returned to the category after defeating San Martín de Tucumán through penalty kicks. The “Tricolor” only spent a year, because in 2007 returned to Torneo Argentino A.

== Titles ==
- Torneo Argentino A (1):

2005–06

- Liga del Sur:

Primera División (8): 1940, 1944, 1991, 1992, 1993, 1994, 1998, 2003
Segunda División (3): 1929, 1988, 2002
