= Sportivo Patria =

Argentine football club

- Full name: Club Patria
- Nickname(s): Decano
- Founded: 24 October 1911; 113 years ago
- Ground: Estadio Antonio Romero, Formosa, Argentina
- Capacity: 33,000
- League: Torneo Federal A
Home colours	Away colours

Club Sportivo Patria is a football club from Formosa, Argentina. The team currently plays in Torneo Federal A, the regionalised third division of the Argentine football league system.

The club has only played one season at the top level of Argentine football, in 1976, when Sportivo contested the Campeonato Nacional, finishing 8th out of nine clubs in group C and failed to qualify to the next stage.

== Other football clubs in Formosa ==
- Club Sportivo General San Martín
- Club Atlético Laguna Blanca
- Club Sol de América
- Club Social, Cultural y Deportivo 13 de Junio
