= Alumni de Villa María =

Argentine football club

- Full name: Club Atlético Alumni
- Nickname(s): Fortinero
- Founded: 4 April 1934; 91 years ago
- Ground: Plaza Manuel Anselmo Ocampo, Villa María; Córdoba Province
- Capacity: 10000
- Chairman: Luís Vilella
- Manager: Raul Maldonado
- League: Torneo Federal B
- 2011–12: 5th of Zone 2
- Website: http://www.alumnivillamaria.com.ar/
Home colours	Away colours

Club Atlético Alumni (usually referred as Alumni de Villa María) is a football club from the city of Villa María, in Córdoba Province, Argentina. The squad currently plays in Torneo Federal B, the regionalised quarter division of the Argentine football league system.

At the end of the 2005–06 season Alumni was promoted from Torneo Argentino B, in which the team won its group, but lost the playoff for automatic promotion. Alumni then went into a promotion/relegation playoff with General Paz Juniors from Argentino A. Alumni won the first leg 5–0, and won the tie 5–2 on aggregate to secure promotion.

The name Alumni derives from one of the most famous clubs from the Amateur era of Argentine football. Buenos Aires English High School, later renamed Alumni Athletic Club, which won 17 championships before being disbanded in 1913.

== See also ==
- List of football clubs in Argentina
- Argentine football league system
