= Racing de Olavarría =

- Full name: Racing Athletic Club de Olavarría
- Nickname(s): Chaira
- Founded: 16 April 1916; 109 years ago
- Ground: José Buglione Martinese, Olavarría; Buenos Aires Province, Argentina
- Capacity: 11.000
- Chairman: Adolfo Palahy
- Manager: Carlos Ranally
- League: Torneo Argentino A
- 2011–12: 9th
- Website: http://www.racingdeolavarria.com.ar/
Home colours	Away colours

Racing Athletic Club is an Argentine sports club located in Olavarría, Buenos Aires Province. The club is mostly known for its football team, which currently plays in Torneo Argentino A, the regionalised third division of Argentine football league system.

Apart from football, other sports practised at the institution are tennis, basketball, softball, bicycle racing, racquetball and bowls.
