= Club Cipolletti =

Argentine sports club

- Full name: Club Cipolletti
- Nicknames: Capataz de la Patagonia; Albinegro
- Founded: 15 October 1926; 99 years ago
- Ground: La Visera de Cemento, Cipolletti, Río Negro Province
- Capacity: 11,000
- Chairman: Luca Mancini
- Manager: Daniel Cravero
- League: Torneo Federal A
- 2011–12: 21º
- Website: clubcipolletti.com
Home colours	Away colours	Third colours

Club Cipolletti is an Argentine sports club, located in the homonymous district of Río Negro Province. The football team currently plays in Torneo Federal A, the regionalised third division of Argentine football league system.

== History ==
Cipoletti was relegated from Torneo Argentino A at the end of the 2005–06 season, due to the poor performance in the Clausura and its inability to beat General Paz Juniors in the relegation playoff.

At the end of the 2006–07 Cipolletti was one of the three champions of Torneo Argentino B allowing the team to return to Torneo Argentino A.

The team has played at the highest level of Argentine football (Primera División) on 6 occasions, having qualified to play in the National championships of 1973, 1975, 1977, 1979, 1980 and 1985, but never made it through the 1st group stage.

== Honours ==
=== National ===
- Torneo del Interior
  - Winners (1): 1991-92
- Torneo Argentino B
  - Winners (1): 2006-07

=== Regional ===
- Liga Deportiva Confluencia
  - Winners (28): Oficial 1975, Petit 1975, Petit 1976, Petit 1977, Oficial 1978, Oficial 1979, Petit 1979, Oficial 1980, Oficial 1983, Oficial 1984, Apertura 1985, Oficial 1985, Oficial 1991, Octogonal 1991, Apertura 1992, Clausura 1992, Petit 1993, Oficial 1994, Clausura 1998, Oficial 2001, Apertura 2003, Apertura 2004, Clausura 2004, Oficial 2005, Oficial 2006, Apertura 2012, Clausura 2014, Apertura 2018.
