= Club Rivadavia =

Argentine football club

Rivadavia
- Full name: Club Rivadavia
- Nickname(s): Rojo
- Founded: 22 March 1915; 109 years ago
- Ground: Estadio Coliseo, Lincoln, Buenos Aires, Argentina
- Capacity: 10,000
- Chairman: Gonzalo Lecina
- Manager: Rubén Peracca
- League: Torneo Argentino A
- 2011–12: 18th
Home colours	Away colours

Club Rivadavia is an Argentine football club from Lincoln, Buenos Aires. The squad currently plays in Torneo Argentino A, the regionalised third division of the Argentine football league system.

At the end of the 2005–06 season Rivadavia was promoted to Argentino A via the promotion/relegation playoff. The team beat Racing de Olavarría 2–1 on aggregate to secure promotion.

== See also ==
- List of football clubs in Argentina
- Argentine football league system
