= Sunchales =

- City
- Location of Sunchales in Argentina
- Coordinates: 30°56′S 61°34′W
- Country: Argentina
- Province: Santa Fe
- Department: Castellanos

Government
  - Intendant: Pablo Pinotti (PS)

Area
  - Total: 360 km^{2} (140 sq mi)
- Elevation: 87 m (285 ft)

Population (2010 census)
  - Total: 21,304
  - Density: 59/km^{2} (150/sq mi)
- Time zone: UTC−3 (ART)
- CPA base: S2322
- Dialing code: +54 3493
- Website: https://www.sunchales.gob.ar/

Sunchales is a city in the province of Santa Fe, Argentina. It has 21,304 inhabitants per the 2010 census [INDEC]. It lies in the center-west of the province, 135 km (84 mi) from the provincial capital Santa Fe, on National Route 34.

Sunchales is located in the most fertile part of Argentina, at the core of the Humid Pampa, and within the so-called "central milk basin", which manufactures most of the country's production of dairy and exports it through the ports on the Paraná River (mainly Rosario and San Lorenzo). It is an important station of the Nuevo Central Argentino railway.

The town was the starting point of SanCor, a dairy cooperative and the leader in its field in Argentina. It is named the Provincial Capital of Cooperativism, and holds important celebrations of the International Day of Cooperatives during the first week of July.

Sunchales is also the seat of the National Festival of Children's Soccer in October, and celebrates the feast of its patron saint, Charles Borromeo, on November 4.

The city has a local basketball team, Libertad Sunchales, which belongs to Argentina's National Basketball League.

== History ==
A fort was established in the site of Sunchales on 11 April 1796 to prevent attacks by aboriginal tribes and guard the road used to carry mercury from Buenos Aires to be at the mines in present-day Peru. The fort also guarded a settlement of about 1,000 people. In 1810, on the wake of the May Revolution, a number of the stationed soldiers were recruited for the independentist expedition led by Manuel Belgrano to Paraguay. The settlement was disbanded by an aboriginal incursion.

In 1867, under the provincial government of Nicasio Oroño, colonists came into the area from Esperanza. The fort was again depopulated when its forces were sent to combat the aboriginal tribes in the north of the province and the south of Chaco, and the colonists disbanded. A few years later, sponsored by governor Mariano Cabal, a group of immigrants (Italian, French, Swiss, German, Spanish, British and Belgian) came into the area, but bad harvests, food shortages and native attacks caused the settlement to fail once again.

The last attempt was conducted by Carlos Christiani, with the first immigrants arriving in 1884. The land plan of the new colony was approved by governor José Gálvez on October 19, 1886. The town was declared a city on the 81st anniversary of its official foundation, in 1967.

== Sports ==
In addition to Libertad Sunchales, which has a basketball and soccer team, the town is the home of Club Atlético Unión de Sunchales.

== Transportation ==
Sunchales is served by Sunchales Aeroclub Airport, which has had service in the past by airlines such as Aerochaco but which has no commercial air service as of 2017.

== Sister Town ==
- Rivarolo Canavese, Italy, since 2000
