= Juventud Unida Universitario =

Argentine football club

- Full name: Club Atlético Juventud Unida Universitario
- Nickname: Juve
- Founded: 8 November 1920; 105 years ago
- Ground: Estadio Mario Sebastián Diez, San Luis, Argentina
- Capacity: 10,000
- League: Primera B Nacional
- 2016: 17° (relegated)
- Website: https://web.archive.org/web/20111203005325/http://juventuddesanluis.com.ar/
Home colours	Away colours

Club Atlético Juventud Unida Universitario is an Argentine football club from San Luis Province. The team currently plays in Torneo Argentino A, the regionalised third division of the Argentine football league system.

== Titles ==
- Torneo Argentino B: 1

2000–01

== Managers ==
- (Argentina) Pablo Marini (2012)
