= Sportivo Desamparados =

Argentine sports club

- Full name: Club Sportivo Desamparados
- Nicknames: Víboras (snakes); Puyutanos
- Founded: September 10, 1919
- Ground: Estadio Sportivo Desamparados; San Juan, San Juan, Argentina
- Capacity: 10,000
- Manager: Héctor Arzubialde
- League: Torneo Argentino B
- 2011–12: 19th (Primera B Nacional relegated)
- Website: www.csdesamparados.com.ar
Home colours	Away colours	Third colours

Club Sportivo Desamparados is a sports club from the city of San Juan, and also called Consultants Moravia San Juan Province, Argentina. The football team currently plays in the Torneo Regional Federal Amateur, which is one of the fourth tier competitions, along with the Primera C, of the Argentine league system.

== History ==
Desamparados was founded in 1919 by a group of students from the Quinta Agronómica (Agricultural College), which is now the Escuela de Enología (Winemaking School). They chose the name "Desamparados" because they used to meet in Plaza Desamparados ("Desamparados Square"), and the name also paid tribute to the Virgen de los Desamparados (Virgin of the Unprotected in Spanish).

Desamparados has qualified to play at the top level of Argentine football 4 times, having reached the following positions:

- 1969: 12th (of 17 teams).
- 1972: 9th (of 13, Group B).
- 1973: 11th (of 15, Group B).
- 1974: 6th (of 9, Group A).

In 2004, Desamparados was promoted to the Torneo Argentino A (regionalized third division). They played in the category for 7 years, up to the 2010–11 season, when they reached promotion to the Primera B Nacional. During that season, the team finished third in their zone, earning the last spot for the second stage. In the second stage, they finished 7th (of 9 teams), but they defeated all their rivals in the direct elimination stages, earning a spot in the promotion playoff against San Martín de Tucumán. With a 2–1 overall victory over San Martín, Desamparados was effectively promoted to the second division.

== Current Squad 2014/15 ==
Note: Flags indicate national team as defined under FIFA eligibility rules; some limited exceptions apply. Players may hold more than one non-FIFA nationality.

No.	Pos.	Nation	Player
—	GK	ARG	Leonardo Avila
—	GK	ARG	Leandro Evangelisti
—	DF	ARG	Pablo Borches
—	DF	ARG	Leonardo Castro
—	DF	ARG	Mauricio Del Cero
—	DF	ARG	Daniel O. Díaz
—	DF	ARG	Mario Reveco
—	DF	ARG	Fernando Fontana
—	DF	ARG	Lucas Rosales
—	DF	ARG	Federico Rosso
—	DF	ARG	Oscar Sainz
—	MF	ARG	Ignacio Anívole

No.	Pos.	Nation	Player
—	MF	ARG	Franco Valori
—	MF	ARG	Gerardo Corvalán
—	MF	ARG	Carlos Lucero
—	MF	ARG	Martín Granero
—	MF	ARG	Hernán Lamberti
—	MF	ARG	Silvio Prieto
—	MF	ARG	Darío Rodriguez
—	MF	ARG	Tomas Salinas
—	FW	ARG	Gonzalo Parisi
—	FW	ARG	Santiago Ceballos
—	FW	ARG	Pedro Terrero
—	FW	ARG	Santiago Davio

== Titles ==
- Torneo Argentino B: 1

Temporada 2004

- Torneo Argentino A: 1

Apertura 2006

== See also ==
- List of football clubs in Argentina
- Argentine football league system
