= Unión de Sunchales =

Argentine sports club

- Full name: Club Atlético Unión
- Nicknames: Bichos Verdes; Verde; Albiverde
- Founded: 2 April 1948; 77 years ago
- Ground: La Fortaleza, Sunchales, Santa Fe Province
- Capacity: 5,600
- Chairman: Daniel Chacón
- Manager: Miguel Isabela
- League: Torneo Argentino A
- 2010–11 Clausura: 6th
- Website: http://www.union-sunchales.com.ar/
Home colours	Away colours

Club Atlético Unión (usually referred as Unión de Sunchales) is an Argentine sports club from Sunchales, Santa Fe Province. Its football team currently plays in the Torneo Argentino A, which is the regionalised third division of the Argentine football league system.

Unión was founded in 1948 as a football club, but it expanded into several different sports, including basketball, where the team currently plays at Torneo Nacional de Ascenso (TNA), the second division of Argentine basketball league system.

Other sports practised at the club are gymnastics, roller skating, rugby union, martial arts, tennis and volleyball.

== History ==
Basketball was added as sport in 1950. The club won its first official title, the Asociación Rafaelina de Básquetbol championship, in 1987 being coached by Roberto Vico.

In 1991 Unión promoted to Liga Nacional B (currently Torneo Nacional de Ascenso, the second division of Argentine basketball). The club spent two seasons in the Nacional B until the team had to leave the tournament due to financial problems. In 2005 Unión won another title promoting to Nacional de Ascenso.

In 2009, Unión promoted to Liga Nacional de Básquetbol, the top division of Argentine basketball.

== Titles ==
=== Basketball ===
- Liga Rafaelina: 9

1987, 1988, 1989, 1992, 1995, 1998, 1999, 2000, 2001
