= Gimnasia y Esgrima de Concepción del Uruguay =

Argentine football club

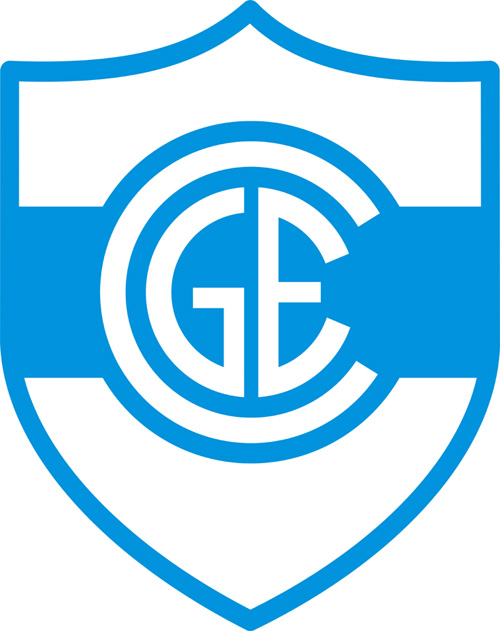
- Full name: Club Gimnasia y Esgrima de Concepción del Uruguay
- Nicknames: Lobo; Mens Sana; Lobo Entrerriano
- Founded: 8 February 1917; 109 years ago
- Ground: Estadio Manuel y Ramón Núñez, Concepción del Uruguay, Entre Ríos
- Capacity: 15,000
- Chairman: Rodrigo Palacios
- Manager: Alejandro Gorno
- League: Torneo Federal A
- 2024: 9° (Zone 3)

Club Gimnasia y Esgrima de Concepción del Uruguay is an Argentine football club from the city of Concepción del Uruguay in Entre Ríos Province. The team currently plays in Torneo Argentino A, the regionalised third division of the Argentine football league system.

Gimnasia y Esgrima has played a single season at national level, competing in Primera B Nacional in 1996–97, but was soon relegated with the 2nd worst points average of the teams from the Interior.

== Titles ==
- Torneo Argentino A: 1

1997

- Torneo del Interior: 1

1995

- Liga de Concepción del Uruguay: 41

1921, 1923, 1925, 1927, 1928, 1929, 1930, 1934, 1935, 1938, 1939, 1942, 1943, 1945, 1947, 1950, 1951, 1952, 1953, 1954, 1956, 1958, 1959, 1960, 1961, 1962, 1966, 1973, 1976, 1977, 1980, 1984, 1985, 1987, 1988, 1989, 1990, 1991, 1992, 1993, 1994

== See also ==
- List of football clubs in Argentina
- Argentine football league system
