= 2019–20 Central Córdoba de Santiago del Estero season =

Central Córdoba
2019–20 season
- President: José Alfano
- Manager: Gustavo Coleoni
- Stadium: Estadio Alfredo Terrera
- Top goalscorer: League: Nicolás Femia (1); Lisandro Alzugaray; Joao Rodríguez; All: Nicolás Femia (1); Lisandro Alzugaray; Joao Rodríguez

The 2019–20 season is Central Córdoba's 1st season back in the top division of Argentine football, after promotion from Primera B Nacional. In addition to the Primera División, the club are competing in the Copa Argentina and Copa de la Superliga.

The season generally covers the period from 1 July 2019 to 30 June 2020.

== Review ==
=== Pre-season ===
Matías Pato returned from his loan spell in the preceding season with Chaco For Ever on 30 June 2019, as did the players loaned in. Fernando Piñero joined Santamarina on 1 July. Four new signings were confirmed by Central Córdoba on 2 July, as Marcelo Meli's loan signing from Racing Club was followed by the permanent arrivals of Juan Pablo Ruíz Gómez, Nicolás Miracco and Juan Galeano. Renso Pérez left for Atlético de Rafaela on 3 July. Nicolás Correa, a centre-back from Defensor Sporting, moved in on 3 July. Facundo Melivilo, who returned to Chacarita Juniors days prior, resigned on loan for 2019–20. A third incoming was also communicated, as Franco Cristaldo came from Boca Juniors. A day after, on 4 July, Ismael Quilez and Alexis Ferrero agreed departures.

Central Córdoba signed goalkeeper Diego Rodríguez from Defensa y Justicia on 5 July. Platense announced Alfredo Ramírez was to join them on 5 July. Pablo Ortega departed on 8 July, securing a contract with Ferro Carril Oeste back in Primera B Nacional. Emanuel Cuevas switched Torneo Federal A for the Primera División on 10 July, as he received a deal with Central Córdoba from San Jorge. Leonardo Villalba and Leandro Requena joined from Defensa y Justicia and Los Andes on 12 July. Central Córdoba travelled to the Predio Armando Pérez to face Belgrano in friendlies on 13 July, ending the day with a draw and a loss. Matías Nani, from Roma, and Lisandro Alzugaray, from Newell's Old Boys, were added on loan to Gustavo Coleoni's squad on 13/14 July.

Also on 13 July, Ezequiel Barrionuevo went to Ecuador with Atlético Porteño. Colombian centre-forward José Adolfo Valencia arrived from Portugal's Feirense on 16 July. On that day, Central Córdoba were held to back-to-back 1–1 draws by second tier Instituto. Valencia was followed through the door by Maximiliano Acuña, Jonathan Herrera and Francisco Manenti (loan) on 17 July. Javier Rossi headed off to Platense on 18 July. Hours prior, Central Córdoba failed to gain their first win of pre-season after a defeat to Atlético Camioneros Córdoba and a tie with General Paz Juniors. They won their first exhibition fixture on 21 July, drawing in normal time with Talleres before going perfect in the subsequent shoot-out; Jonathan Herrera scored the decisive kick for Central Córdoba.

Another player arrived to Central Córdoba on 21 July, as Nicolás Femia exited Sacachispas. Leonel Ferroni came on loan from Newell's on 22 July, reuniting with Alzugaray and Manenti. 24 July saw César Taborda go to Guillermo Brown. Juan Ignacio Barbieri signed terms from Ferro Carril Sud de Olavarría on 25 July, as Diego Jara left for All Boys.

=== July ===
Newell's Old Boys, on 28 July, condemned Central Córdoba to defeat in their first match of the Primera División in 2019–20. Joao Rodríguez joined Central Córdoba on 30 July 2019, having spent the previous six months without a club after his release by Chelsea. Gervasio Núñez was the next new face in, as he came from Atlético Tucumán on 31 July.

=== August ===
Boca Juniors youngster Oscar Salomón agreed a loan move to Central Córdoba on 1 August. Central Córdoba won the first three points in their return to the Primera División over Atlético Tucumán on 3 August, with Nicolás Femia scoring early on in a 1–0 victory. Luis Salces terminated his contract on 10 August; he later joined Gimnasia y Esgrima (M). Central Córdoba made it two Primera División matches unbeaten on 16 August after securing a point away to Talleres. Central Córdoba advanced into the Copa Argentina round of sixteen on 21 August, defeating Primera B Nacional's All Boys thanks to a goal from Joao Rodríguez. Central Córdoba held reigning champions Racing Club to a goalless draw at home on 25 August, prior to losing on the road to Lanús on 30 August.

== Squad ==
| Squad No. | Nationality | Name | Position(s) | Date of birth (age) | Signed from |
Goalkeepers
| 1 | Argentina | Diego Rodríguez | GK | 25 July 1989 (age 37) | Defensa y Justicia |
| 13 | Argentina | Enzo López | GK | 19 November 1996 (age 29) | Academy |
| 17 | Argentina | Leandro Requena | GK | 11 September 1987 (age 39) | Los Andes |
| 23 | Argentina | Maximiliano Cavallotti | GK | 15 November 1984 (age 41) | Argentinos Juniors |
Defenders
| 2 | Uruguay | Nicolás Correa | CB | 25 December 1983 (age 42) | Defensor Sporting |
| 3 | Argentina | Matías Nani | CB | 26 March 1998 (age 28) | Roma (loan) |
| 4 | Argentina | Oscar Salomón | CB | March 1999 | Boca Juniors (loan) |
| 6 | Argentina | Marcos Sánchez | LB | 14 March 1990 (age 36) | Gimnasia y Esgrima (J) |
| 12 | Argentina | Jonathan Bay | LB | 1 February 1993 (age 33) | Ferro Carril Oeste |
| 16 | Argentina | Maximiliano Acuña | DF | 19 June 1998 (age 28) | Instituto Deportivo Santiago |
| 24 | Paraguay | Hugo Vera Oviedo | RB | 1 January 1991 (age 35) | Ferro Carril Oeste |
| 26 | Argentina | Cristian Díaz | LB | 16 May 1989 (age 37) | Gimnasia y Esgrima (J) |
| 27 | Argentina | Ignacio Barros | DF | | Academy |
| 29 | Argentina | Ismael Quílez | RB | 1 November 1989 (age 37) | Aldosivi |
| 31 | Argentina | Francisco Manenti | CB | 31 October 1996 (age 30) | Newell's Old Boys (loan) |
| 34 | Argentina | Leonel Ferroni | LB | 29 January 1996 (age 30) | Newell's Old Boys (loan) |
| | Argentina | Francisco Dutari | CB | 3 March 1988 (age 38) | Guillermo Brown |
Midfielders
| 5 | Argentina | Cristian Vega | MF | 17 September 1993 (age 33) | Academy |
| 7 | Argentina | Mauro Barraza | MF | 15 May 1996 (age 30) | Academy |
| 8 | Argentina | Marcelo Meli | AM | 20 June 1992 (age 34) | Racing Club (loan) |
| 14 | Argentina | Juan Galeano | CM | 3 July 1989 (age 37) | Aldosivi |
| 15 | Argentina | Lisandro Alzugaray | AM | 17 April 1990 (age 36) | Newell's Old Boys (loan) |
| 19 | Argentina | Emanuel Romero | MF | 23 March 1992 (age 34) | Unión Sunchales |
| 20 | Argentina | Facundo Melivilo | LW | 12 August 1992 (age 34) | Chacarita Juniors (loan) |
| 21 | Argentina | Santiago Gallucci | CM | 8 March 1991 (age 35) | Unión Española |
| 22 | Argentina | Emanuel Cuevas | LM | 31 May 1997 (age 29) | San Jorge |
| 25 | Argentina | Franco Cristaldo | CM | 15 August 1996 (age 30) | Boca Juniors |
| 28 | Argentina | Leonardo Villalba | LW | 29 November 1994 (age 31) | Defensa y Justicia |
| 30 | Argentina | Nicolás Miracco | MF | 12 April 1991 (age 35) | Sarmiento |
| 32 | Argentina | Axel Pinto | MF | 18 September 2000 (age 26) | Academy |
| 36 | Argentina | Nicolás Femia | AM | 8 August 1996 (age 30) | Sacachispas |
| 40 | Argentina | Gervasio Núñez | LM | 29 January 1988 (age 38) | Atlético Tucumán |
Forwards
| 10 | Argentina | Matías Pato | FW | 4 September 1992 (age 34) | Academy |
| 11 | Argentina | Juan Pablo Ruíz Gómez | FW | 10 January 1994 (age 32) | Estudiantes (BA) |
| 18 | Colombia | José Adolfo Valencia | CF | 18 December 1991 (age 34) | Feirense |
| 33 | Colombia | Joao Rodríguez | FW | 19 May 1996 (age 30) | Chelsea |
| 35 | Argentina | Jonathan Herrera | FW | 16 September 1991 (age 35) | Deportivo Riestra |
| | Argentina | Juan Ignacio Barbieri | FW | 17 September 1996 (age 30) | Ferro Carril Sud de Olavarría |
| | Argentina | Pablo Barraza | FW | 4 May 2000 (age 26) | Academy |
| | Argentina | Emir Izaguirre | CF | 26 January 1995 (age 31) | Unión Aconquija |
| | Argentina | Nahuel Luján | FW | 23 August 1995 (age 31) | Belgrano |
| | Argentina | Lautaro Robles | FW | 26 July 1985 (age 41) | Gimnasia y Esgrima (CdU) |

== Transfers ==
Domestic transfer windows:
3 July 2019 to 24 September 2019
20 January 2020 to 19 February 2020.

=== Transfers in ===
| Date from | Position | Nationality | Name | From | Ref. |
|---|---|---|---|---|---|
| 3 July 2019 (Note: Deal agreed on 1 July 2019) | FW | Argentina | Juan Pablo Ruíz Gómez | Estudiantes (BA) | |
| 3 July 2019 (Note: Deal agreed on 2 July 2019) | MF | Argentina | Nicolás Miracco | Sarmiento | |
| 3 July 2019 (Note: Deal agreed on 2 July 2019) | CM | Argentina | Juan Galeano | Aldosivi | |
| 3 July 2019 | CB | Uruguay | Nicolás Correa | Defensor Sporting | |
| 3 July 2019 | CM | Argentina | Franco Cristaldo | Boca Juniors | |
| 4 July 2019 | RB | Argentina | Ismael Quilez | Aldosivi | |
| 5 July 2019 | GK | Argentina | Diego Rodríguez | Defensa y Justicia | |
| 10 July 2019 | LM | Argentina | Emanuel Cuevas | San Jorge | |
| 12 July 2019 | RW | Argentina | Leonardo Villalba | Defensa y Justicia | |
| 12 July 2019 | GK | Argentina | Leandro Requena | Los Andes | |
| 16 July 2019 | CF | Colombia | José Adolfo Valencia | Feirense | |
| 17 July 2019 | DF | Argentina | Maximiliano Acuña | Instituto Deportivo Santiago | |
| 17 July 2019 | FW | Argentina | Jonathan Herrera | Deportivo Riestra | |
| 21 July 2019 | AM | Argentina | Nicolás Femia | Sacachispas | |
| 25 July 2019 | FW | Argentina | Juan Ignacio Barbieri | Ferro Carril Sud de Olavarría | |
| 30 July 2019 | FW | Colombia | Joao Rodríguez | Unattached (Note: Previously played for Chelsea (2013–2019).) | |
| 31 July 2019 | LM | Argentina | Gervasio Núñez | Atlético Tucumán | |

=== Transfers out ===
| Date from | Position | Nationality | Name | To | Ref. |
|---|---|---|---|---|---|
| 3 July 2019 (Note: Deal agreed on 1 July 2019) | CB | Argentina | Fernando Piñero | Santamarina | |
| 3 July 2019 | RM | Argentina | Renso Pérez | Atlético de Rafaela | |
| 5 July 2019 | AM | Argentina | Alfredo Ramírez | Platense | |
| 8 July 2019 | AM | Argentina | Pablo Ortega | Ferro Carril Oeste | |
| 13 July 2019 | AM | Argentina | Ezequiel Barrionuevo | Atlético Porteño | |
| 18 July 2019 | FW | Argentina | Javier Rossi | Platense | |
| 23 July 2019 (Note: Deal agreed on 4 July 2019) | CB | Argentina | Alexis Ferrero | San Luis | |
| 24 July 2019 | GK | Argentina | César Taborda | Guillermo Brown | |
| 25 July 2019 | CF | Argentina | Diego Jara | All Boys | |
| 14 August 2019 | LW | Argentina | Luis Salces | Gimnasia y Esgrima (M) (Note: Released by Central Córdoba on 10 August.) | |

=== Loans in ===
| Start date | Position | Nationality | Name | From | End date | Ref. |
|---|---|---|---|---|---|---|
| 3 July 2019 (Note: Deal agreed on 2 July 2019) | AM | Argentina | Marcelo Meli | Racing Club | 30 June 2020 | |
| 3 July 2019 | LW | Argentina | Facundo Melivilo | Chacarita Juniors | 30 June 2020 | |
| 13 July 2019 | CB | Argentina | Matías Nani | Roma | 30 June 2020 | |
| 14 July 2019 | AM | Argentina | Lisandro Alzugaray | Newell's Old Boys | 30 June 2020 | |
| 17 July 2019 | CB | Argentina | Francisco Manenti | Newell's Old Boys | 30 June 2020 | |
| 22 July 2019 | LB | Argentina | Leonel Ferroni | Newell's Old Boys | 30 June 2020 | |
| 1 August 2019 | CB | Argentina | Oscar Salomón | Boca Juniors | 30 June 2020 | |

== Friendlies ==
=== Pre-season ===
Belgrano released details of a pre-season friendly with Central Córdoba on 26 June 2019, with Ferroviario travelling to the Predio Armando Pérez in Córdoba on 13 July. Instituto revealed a match with them on 4 July. Central Córdoba confirmed the aforementioned fixtures on 7 July, while also announcing two further games; including against Talleres, which would be televised. The Instituto fixture was rescheduled from 15 July to 16 July on 14 July, as Atlético Camioneros Córdoba and General Paz Juniors were announced as opponents.

Win Draw Loss

| 13 July 2019 Friendly | Belgrano | 1–0 | Central Córdoba | Córdoba, Argentina |
| | P. Vegetti | Mundo D - La Voz; 60 min. match | | Stadium: Predio Armando Pérez; Referee: Ezequiel Billone (Argentina) |

| 13 July 2019 Friendly | Belgrano | 1–1 | Central Córdoba | Córdoba, Argentina |
| | L. Villalba | Mundo D - La Voz; 60 min. match | L. Sequeira | Stadium: Predio Armando Pérez; Referee: Ezequiel Billone (Argentina) |

| 16 July 2019 Friendly | Instituto | 1–1 | Central Córdoba | Córdoba, Argentina |
| 10:15 GMT-3 | M. Bajamich | Instituto; Vía País; 60 min. match | J. Galeano | Stadium: Estadio Presidente Perón |

| 16 July 2019 Friendly | Instituto | 1–1 | Central Córdoba | Córdoba, Argentina |
| | M. Barzola | Instituto; Vía País; 60 min. match | M. Pato | Stadium: Estadio Presidente Perón |

| 18 July 2019 Friendly | Atlético Camioneros Córdoba | 2–1 | Central Córdoba | Córdoba, Argentina |
| 15:15 GMT-3 | Goal | Mundo D - La Voz; 50 min. match | M. Barraza | Stadium: Soccer World |

| 18 July 2019 Friendly | Central Córdoba | 1–1 | General Paz Juniors | Córdoba, Argentina |
| 16:30 GMT-3 | F. Melivilo | Mundo D - La Voz; 50 min. match | C. Martínez | Stadium: Soccer World |

| 21 July 2019 Friendly | Talleres | 1–1 (4–5 p) | Central Córdoba | Córdoba, Argentina |
| | J. Gandolfi 3' | Talleres; Vía País | F. Cristaldo 48' | Stadium: Estadio Mario Alberto Kempes; Referee: Nicolás Lamolina (Argentina) |
| | Penalties |
| | J. Arias (penalty scored); N. Bustos (penalty scored); I. Méndez (penalty scored); F. Fragapane (penalty scored); D. Valoyes (penalty missed) | | F. Rodríguez (penalty scored); H. Vera Oviedo (penalty scored); M. Nani (penalty scored); F. Cristaldo (penalty scored); J. Herrera (penalty scored) |

== Competitions ==
=== Primera División ===
==== League table ====
| Pos | Team | Pld | W | D | L | GF | GA | GD | Pts |
|---|---|---|---|---|---|---|---|---|---|
| 16 | Unión | 23 | 7 | 6 | 10 | 21 | 30 | −9 | 27 |
| 17 | Banfield | 23 | 6 | 8 | 9 | 19 | 23 | −4 | 26 |
| 18 | Central Córdoba (SdE) | 23 | 6 | 8 | 9 | 21 | 29 | −8 | 26 |
| 19 | Gimnasia y Esgrima (LP) | 23 | 6 | 5 | 12 | 22 | 23 | −1 | 23 |
| 20 | Patronato | 23 | 5 | 8 | 10 | 22 | 34 | −12 | 23 |

Source: AFA
Rules for classification: 1) points; 2) play-off (only if needed to decide championship); 3) goal difference; 4) goals scored; 5) head-to-head points; 6) head-to-head goal difference; 7) head-to-head goals scored.

==== Relegation table ====
| Pos | Team | 2017–18 Pts | 2018–19 Pts | 2019–20 Pts | Total Pts | Total Pld | Avg | Relegation |
|---|---|---|---|---|---|---|---|---|
| 20 | Banfield | 35 | 29 | 4 | 68 | 57 | 1.193 | |
| 21 | Colón | 41 | 23 | 4 | 68 | 57 | 1.193 | |
| 22 | Rosario Central | 32 | 26 | 9 | 67 | 57 | 1.175 | Relegation to Primera B Nacional |
| 23 | Central Córdoba (SdE) | 0 | 0 | 5 | 5 | 5 | 1 | Relegation to Primera B Nacional |
| 24 | Gimnasia y Esgrima (LP) | 27 | 29 | 1 | 57 | 57 | 1 | Relegation to Primera B Nacional |

Source: AFA

==== Results summary ====
| Overall | | | | | | | | Home | | | | | | Away | | | | | |
| Pld | W | D | L | GF | GA | GD | Pts | W | D | L | GF | GA | GD | W | D | L | GF | GA | GD |
|---|---|---|---|---|---|---|---|---|---|---|---|---|---|---|---|---|---|---|---|
| 5 | 1 | 2 | 2 | 2 | 4 | −2 | 5 | 1 | 1 | 0 | 1 | 0 | +1 | 0 | 1 | 2 | 1 | 4 | −3 |

Last updated: 31 August 2019.
Source: Soccerway

==== Matches ====
The fixtures for the 2019–20 campaign were released on 10 July.

Win Draw Loss

| 28 July 2019 1 | Newell's Old Boys | 2–0 | Central Córdoba | Rosario, Argentina |
| 13:15 GMT-3 | A. Rodríguez 45'; L. Albertengo 86' | Central Córdoba; Infobae; Soccerway | | Stadium: Estadio Marcelo Bielsa; Referee: Facundo Tello (Argentina) |

| 3 August 2019 2 | Central Córdoba | 1–0 | Atlético Tucumán | Santiago del Estero, Argentina |
| 17:45 GMT-3 | N. Femia 3' | Infobae; Soccerway | | Stadium: Estadio Alfredo Terrera; Referee: Pablo Echavarría (Argentina) |

| 16 August 2019 3 | Talleres | 1–1 | Central Córdoba | Córdoba, Argentina |
| 21:10 GMT-3 | I. Méndez 31' | Talleres; Infobae; Soccerway | L. Alzugaray 64' | Stadium: Estadio Mario Alberto Kempes; Referee: Nicolás Lamolina (Argentina) |

| 25 August 2019 4 | Central Córdoba | 0–0 | Racing Club | Santiago del Estero, Argentina |
| 15:30 GMT-3 | | Infobae; Soccerway | | Stadium: Estadio Alfredo Terrera; Referee: Mauro Vigliano (Argentina) |

| 30 August 2019 5 | Lanús | 1–0 | Central Córdoba | Lanús, Argentina |
| 19:00 GMT-3 | C. Auzqui 29' | Infobae; Soccerway | | Stadium: Estadio Ciudad de Lanús – Néstor Díaz Pérez; Referee: Hernán Mastrángelo (Argentina) |

| 6 | Central Córdoba | – | Defensa y Justicia | Santiago del Estero, Argentina |
| | | | | Stadium: Estadio Alfredo Terrera |

=== Copa Argentina ===
Central Córdoba were drawn with All Boys of Primera B Nacional in the Copa Argentina round of thirty-two. After advancing, Villa Mitre became their round of sixteen opponents.

Win Draw Loss

| 21 August 2019 R32 | All Boys | 0–1 | Central Córdoba | Santa Fe, Argentina |
| 15:30 GMT-3 | | TyC Sports; Soccerway | J. Rodríguez 14' | Stadium: Estadio 15 de Abril; Referee: Lobo Medina (Argentina) |

| 8 September 2019 R16 | Villa Mitre | – | Central Córdoba | Cutral Có, Argentina |
| 15:05 GMT-3 | | | | Stadium: Estadio Coloso del Ruca Quimey |

=== Copa de la Superliga ===
Win Draw Loss

| | – |
| 00:00 GMT-3 |

== Squad statistics ==
=== Appearances and goals ===
| No. | Pos. | Nationality | Name | League | | Cup | | League Cup | | Continental | | Total | | Discipline | | Ref |
| No. | Pos. | Nationality | Name | Apps | Goals | Apps | Goals | Apps | Goals | Apps | Goals | Apps | Goals | Yellow card | Red card | Ref |
|---|---|---|---|---|---|---|---|---|---|---|---|---|---|---|---|---|
| 1 | GK | Argentina | Diego Rodríguez | 5 | 0 | 0 | 0 | 0 | 0 | — | | 5 | 0 | 0 | 0 | |
| 2 | CB | Uruguay | Nicolás Correa | 1 | 0 | 1 | 0 | 0 | 0 | — | | 2 | 0 | 2 | 0 | |
| 3 | CB | Argentina | Matías Nani | 5 | 0 | 0 | 0 | 0 | 0 | — | | 5 | 0 | 2 | 0 | |
| 4 | CB | Argentina | Oscar Salomón | 0 | 0 | 1 | 0 | 0 | 0 | — | | 1 | 0 | 0 | 0 | |
| 5 | MF | Argentina | Cristian Vega | 5 | 0 | 0 | 0 | 0 | 0 | — | | 5 | 0 | 2 | 0 | |
| 6 | LB | Argentina | Marcos Sánchez | 1(1) | 0 | 1 | 0 | 0 | 0 | — | | 2(1) | 0 | 1 | 0 | |
| 7 | MF | Argentina | Mauro Barraza | 0(1) | 0 | 0 | 0 | 0 | 0 | — | | 0(1) | 0 | 0 | 0 | |
| 8 | AM | Argentina | Marcelo Meli | 3 | 0 | 0 | 0 | 0 | 0 | — | | 3 | 0 | 0 | 1 | |
| 10 | FW | Argentina | Matías Pato | 0 | 0 | 0 | 0 | 0 | 0 | — | | 0 | 0 | 0 | 0 | |
| 11 | FW | Argentina | Juan Pablo Ruíz Gómez | 0 | 0 | 0 | 0 | 0 | 0 | — | | 0 | 0 | 0 | 0 | |
| 12 | LB | Argentina | Jonathan Bay | 5 | 0 | 0 | 0 | 0 | 0 | — | | 5 | 0 | 1 | 0 | |
| 13 | GK | Argentina | Enzo López | 0 | 0 | 0 | 0 | 0 | 0 | — | | 0 | 0 | 0 | 0 | |
| 14 | CM | Argentina | Juan Galeano | 2(1) | 0 | 1 | 0 | 0 | 0 | — | | 3(1) | 0 | 0 | 0 | |
| 15 | AM | Argentina | Lisandro Alzugaray | 0(4) | 1 | 1 | 0 | 0 | 0 | — | | 1(4) | 1 | 0 | 0 | |
| 16 | DF | Argentina | Maximiliano Acuña | 0 | 0 | 0 | 0 | 0 | 0 | — | | 0 | 0 | 0 | 0 | |
| 17 | GK | Argentina | Leandro Requena | 0 | 0 | 0 | 0 | 0 | 0 | — | | 0 | 0 | 0 | 0 | |
| 18 | CF | Colombia | José Adolfo Valencia | 5 | 0 | 0 | 0 | 0 | 0 | — | | 5 | 0 | 1 | 0 | |
| 19 | MF | Argentina | Emanuel Romero | 0 | 0 | 0 | 0 | 0 | 0 | — | | 0 | 0 | 0 | 0 | |
| 20 | LW | Argentina | Facundo Melivilo | 4(1) | 0 | 0 | 0 | 0 | 0 | — | | 4(1) | 0 | 1 | 0 | |
| 21 | CM | Argentina | Santiago Gallucci | 0 | 0 | 0(1) | 0 | 0 | 0 | — | | 0(1) | 0 | 0 | 0 | |
| 22 | LM | Argentina | Emanuel Cuevas | 0 | 0 | 0 | 0 | 0 | 0 | — | | 0 | 0 | 0 | 0 | |
| 23 | GK | Argentina | Maximiliano Cavallotti | 0 | 0 | 1 | 0 | 0 | 0 | — | | 1 | 0 | 0 | 0 | |
| 24 | RB | Paraguay | Hugo Vera Oviedo | 4 | 0 | 0 | 0 | 0 | 0 | — | | 4 | 0 | 3 | 1 | |
| 25 | CM | Argentina | Franco Cristaldo | 5 | 0 | 0 | 0 | 0 | 0 | — | | 5 | 0 | 0 | 0 | |
| 26 | LB | Argentina | Cristian Díaz | 4 | 0 | 1 | 0 | 0 | 0 | — | | 5 | 0 | 1 | 0 | |
| 27 | DF | Argentina | Ignacio Barros | 0 | 0 | 0 | 0 | 0 | 0 | — | | 0 | 0 | 0 | 0 | |
| 28 | RW | Argentina | Leonardo Villalba | 0(2) | 0 | 0 | 0 | 0 | 0 | — | | 0(2) | 0 | 0 | 0 | |
| 29 | RB | Argentina | Ismael Quílez | 1 | 0 | 0 | 0 | 0 | 0 | — | | 1 | 0 | 0 | 0 | |
| 30 | MF | Argentina | Nicolás Miracco | 0 | 0 | 0 | 0 | 0 | 0 | — | | 0 | 0 | 0 | 0 | |
| 31 | CB | Argentina | Francisco Manenti | 0 | 0 | 0(1) | 0 | 0 | 0 | — | | 0(!) | 0 | 0 | 0 | |
| 32 | MF | Argentina | Axel Pinto | 0 | 0 | 0 | 0 | 0 | 0 | — | | 0 | 0 | 0 | 0 | |
| 33 | FW | Colombia | Joao Rodríguez | 0(2) | 0 | 1 | 1 | 0 | 0 | — | | 1(2) | 1 | 0 | 0 | |
| 34 | LB | Argentina | Leonel Ferroni | 0 | 0 | 1 | 0 | 0 | 0 | — | | 1 | 0 | 0 | 0 | |
| 35 | FW | Argentina | Jonathan Herrera | 2(2) | 0 | 1 | 0 | 0 | 0 | — | | 3(2) | 0 | 0 | 0 | |
| 36 | AM | Argentina | Nicolás Femia | 2 | 1 | 0 | 0 | 0 | 0 | — | | 2 | 1 | 0 | 0 | |
| 40 | LM | Argentina | Gervasio Núñez | 1(1) | 0 | 1 | 0 | 0 | 0 | — | | 2(1) | 0 | 1 | 0 | |
| – | CB | Argentina | Francisco Dutari | 0 | 0 | 0 | 0 | 0 | 0 | — | | 0 | 0 | 0 | 0 | |
| – | FW | Argentina | Juan Ignacio Barbieri | 0 | 0 | 0 | 0 | 0 | 0 | — | | 0 | 0 | 0 | 0 | |
| – | FW | Argentina | Pablo Barraza | 0 | 0 | 0(1) | 0 | 0 | 0 | — | | 0(1) | 0 | 0 | 0 | |
| – | CF | Argentina | Emir Izaguirre | 0 | 0 | 0 | 0 | 0 | 0 | — | | 0 | 0 | 0 | 0 | |
| – | FW | Argentina | Nahuel Luján | 0 | 0 | 0 | 0 | 0 | 0 | — | | 0 | 0 | 0 | 0 | |
| – | FW | Argentina | Lautaro Robles | 0 | 0 | 0 | 0 | 0 | 0 | — | | 0 | 0 | 0 | 0 | |
| Own goals | | | | — | 0 | — | 0 | — | 0 | — | | — | 0 | — | — | — |
Players who left during the season
| 9 | FW | Argentina | Luis Salces | 0 | 0 | 0 | 0 | 0 | 0 | — | | 0 | 0 | 0 | 0 | |

Statistics accurate as of 31 August 2019.

=== Goalscorers ===
| Rank | Pos | No. | Nat | Name | League | Cup | League Cup | Continental | Total | Ref |
|---|---|---|---|---|---|---|---|---|---|---|
| 1 | AM | 36 | Argentina | Nicolás Femia | 1 | 0 | 0 | 0 | 1 | |
| 1 | AM | 15 | Argentina | Lisandro Alzugaray | 1 | 0 | 0 | 0 | 1 | |
| 1 | FW | 33 | Colombia | Joao Rodríguez | 0 | 1 | 0 | 0 | 1 | |
| Own goals | | | | | 0 | 0 | 0 | 0 | 0 | |
| Totals | | | | | 2 | 1 | 0 | 0 | 3 | — |
