= 2019 Copa Argentina final =

Argentina football tournament final

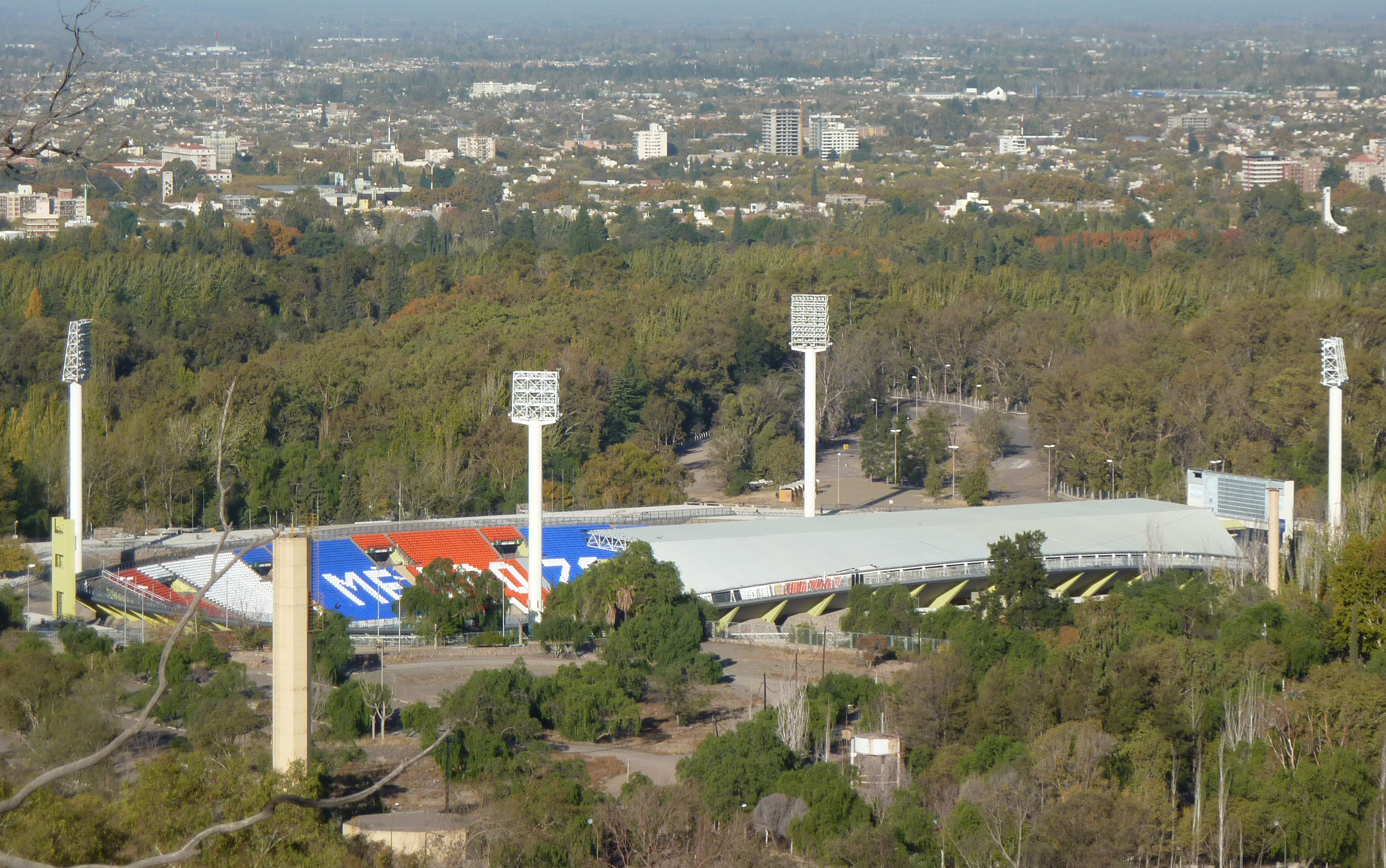
- The match was played at the Estadio Malvinas Argentinas.
- Event: 2018–19 Copa Argentina
Central Córdoba (SdE)	River Plate
0	3
- Date: December 13, 2019
- Venue: Estadio Malvinas Argentinas, Mendoza
- Man of the Match: Ignacio Fernández
- Referee: Facundo Tello
- Attendance: 40,000

The 2019 Copa Argentina final was a football match between Central Córdoba (SdE) and River Plate on 13 December 2019 at the Estadio Malvinas Argentinas in Mendoza, Argentina. It was the final match of the 2018–19 Copa Argentina, the eighth edition of Argentine football's annual cup competition, organised by the Argentine Football Association (AFA). Central Córdoba were appearing in the final for the first time, while River Plate were making their third appearance after winning the competition consecutively in 2016 and 2017.

Both teams entered the competition in the final round, although Central Córdoba were in the Primera B Nacional, the second tier of the football league system in Argentina, and thereby outside the top-flight Primera División. Matches up to the semi-final were contested on a one-off basis, with a penalty shoot-out taking place if any game ended tied after 90 minutes. All of Central Córdoba's matches were close affairs, while the majority of River Plate's contests varied from close to comfortable victories.

Watched by a crowd of 40,000, River Plate took the lead thirty minutes into the match courtesy of striker Ignacio Scocco. They extended this lead in the second half when midfielder Ignacio Fernández scored, and added one further four minutes later after a goal from Julián Alvarez. Following a 3–0 scoreline, River Plate earned their third Copa Argentina win.

== Route to the final ==
=== Central Córdoba (SdE) ===
Central Córdoba's route to the final
Round	Opposition	Score
R64	Nueva Chicago	1–0
R32	All Boys	1–0
R16	Villa Mitre	2–1
QF	Estudiantes (LP)	1–0
SF	Lanús	1–0

As a Primera B Nacional team, Central Córdoba started their Copa Argentina campaign in the Round of 64, being drawn against fellow second tier side Nueva Chicago. The match, played at the Estadio Brigadier General Estanislao López, saw its only goal when Facundo Melivilo capitalized on a mistake in defence early in the closing half. This strike sent Central Córdoba through to the next round, where they would face another Primera B Nacional team in All Boys. At the Estadio 15 de Abril, Colombian forward Joao Rodríguez scored the solitary goal of the game, following a pass by Lisandro Alzugaray, which granted his team qualification into the Round of 16. Torneo Federal A side Villa Mitre were their next opposition, in a match held at the Estadio Alvaro Pedro Ducás. The score would remain goalless until the 76th minute, when Central Córdoba's Jonathan Herrera scored after a cross from Melivilo. They extended their lead through Alzugaray nearing the end of the half. Villa Mitre pulled one back in stoppage time, but were unable to tie the game.

In the quarter-finals, they faced fellow Primera División team Estudiantes (LP). (Note: Central Córdoba played their first two Copa Argentina rounds while competing in the 2018–19 Primera B Nacional, the second tier of the Argentine football league system. They later gained promotion to the first division on 8 June 2019, before their Round of 16 match against Villa Mitre.) At the Estadio Monumental Presidente Perón, Gervasio Núñez put Central Córdoba ahead in the 74th minute, after he received a pass from Herrera. They ultimately held the advantage to see the match off and progress into the semi-finals. Their last opposition before the final were Lanús, who they played at the Estadio Carlos Augusto Mercado Luna. After a scoreless opening half, midfielder Cristian Vega unleashed a volley far from the 18-yard box that beat the opposing goalkeeper. Central Córdoba managed to fend off Lanus' efforts during the remainder of the game, and clinched a fourth 1–0 victory to reach their first Copa Argentina final.

=== River Plate ===
River Plate's route to the final
Round	Opposition	Score
R64	Argentino de Merlo	3–0
R32	Gimnasia y Esgrima (M)	1–1 (5–4 p)
R16	Godoy Cruz	1–0
QF	Almagro	2–0
SF	Estudiantes (BA)	2–0

River Plate also started their campaign in the Round of 64, where they were drawn against Primera D team Argentino de Merlo at the Estadio Padre Ernesto Martearena. The match remained tied until the 70th minute, when Rafael Santos Borré scored from a rebound to put River Plate ahead. Borré later assisted Matías Suárez twice to seal a 3–0 win that sent them into the next round. In the Round of 32, they faced Gimnasia y Esgrima (M), from the Primera B Nacional, at the Estadio Único de Villa Mercedes. River Plate once again opened the scoring midway through the second half, after a shot from Benjamin Rollheiser was swung for the net by Exequiel Palacios. Their opposition responded swiftly, however, as they tied the match just four minutes later. No further goals were scored, and thus a penalty shoot-out was required to determine a winner. Both teams had converted their three opening spot kicks up until the fourth Gimansia y Esgrima penalty, which hit the crossbar. As no other were missed, River Plate advanced into the Round of 16, where they played fellow Primera División side Godoy Cruz. At the Estadio Ciudad de Lanús, River Plate broke the parity in the 22nd minute, when a cross from Ignacio Fernández was headed by two opposing players into their own net. The result would remain, ensuring their progression into the quarter-finals.

In the next round, they were paired against another Primera B Nacional team in Almagro. Just six minutes into the game, Borré opened the scoring at the Estadio Malvinas Argentinas, tapping in a rebound from a shot that hit the crossbar. Twelve minutes from the restart, Ignacio Scocco made it 2–0 after controlling a chipped pass from Fernández. No further goals were scored, and River Plate reached the semi-finals. Primera B Nacional squad Estudiantes (BA) were their last opposition before the final. The teams had already faced each other in the 2012–13 edition, in which Estudiantes knocked River Plate out in the Round of 32 with a 1–0 scoreline. The rematch, held at the Estadio Mario Alberto Kempes, saw River Plate take the lead after Lucas Martínez Quarta headed the ball from a corner over to Javier Pinola, who scored with a header of his own in injury time of the first half. The result remained unchanged until stoppage time of the closing half, when Palacios finished a counter-attack by taking a shot on an empty net. Following a 2–0 win, River Plate advanced into their third Copa Argentina final.

== Background ==
The Argentine Football Association (AFA) established the Copa Argentina in May 2011, as the national cup competition for the 2011–2012 Argentine football season. Since its inaugural edition, it has been held annually, albeit undergoing several format changes over the years.

The match was Central Córdoba's first appearance in a Copa Argentina final. In turn, River Plate were appearing for the third time, having won their previous two finals. They had first beaten Rosario Central 4–3 in 2016, and then successfully defended their title against Atlético Tucumán, who they beat 2–1 in the 2017 edition. It was the first meeting between the two sides in the competition, and the second overall. Their only other official game was during the 1967 Campeonato Nacional, which ended 1–0 in favour of River Plate.

Both teams played their last match before the final on 8 December. Central Córdoba suffered a 2–1 away defeat against Gimnasia y Esgrima (LP), while River Plate lost 1–0 to San Lorenzo at the Estadio Monumental.

== Match ==
=== Summary ===
==== First half ====
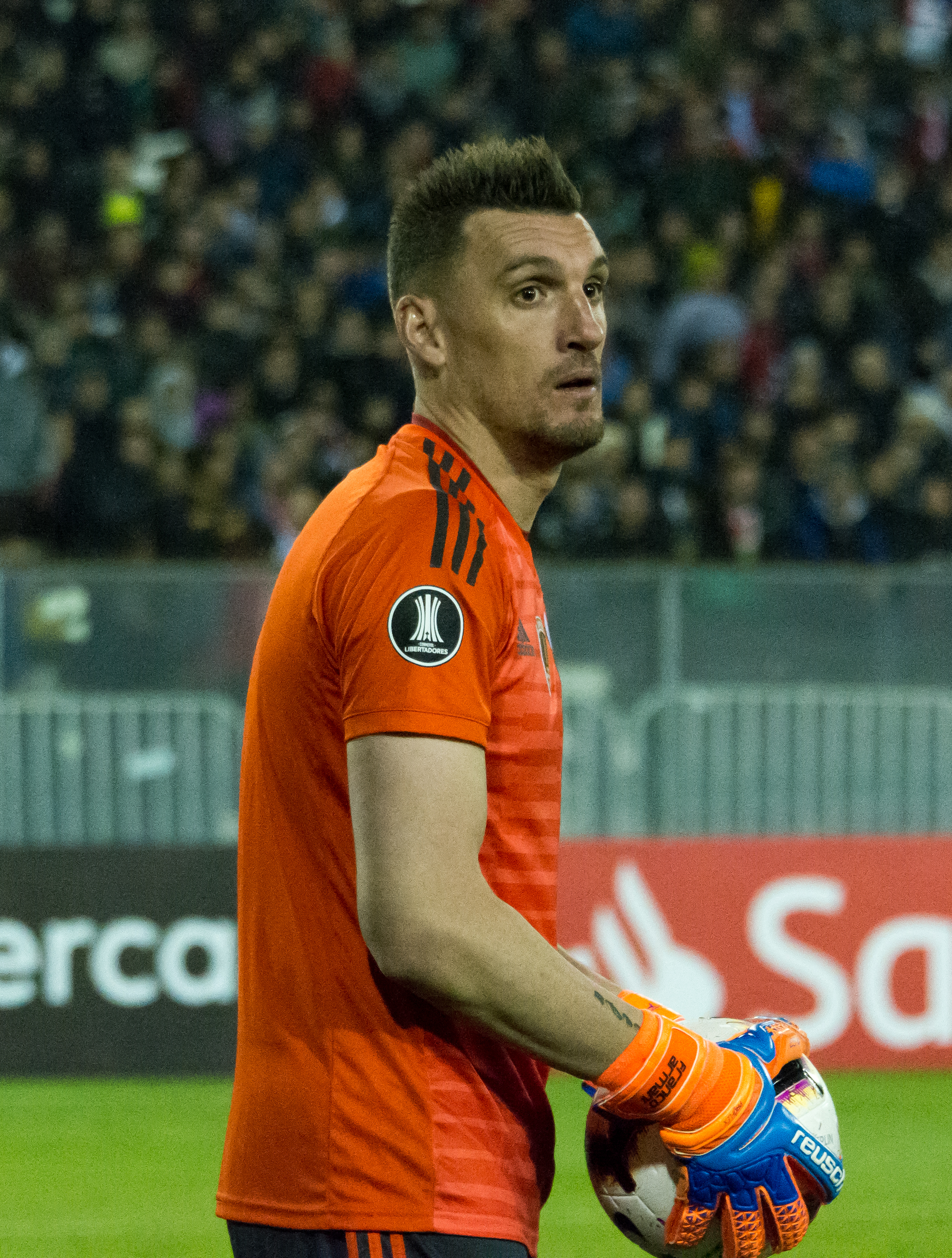
Goalkeeper Franco Armani denied two clear chances from Central Córdoba.

River Plate attempted to gain early control of the game, looking for ball possession in the Central Córdoba half. Their opposition replied through an intense display, as they exerted significant effort in order to negate those advances, which proved to be successful. The 5–4–1 formation lined up by their manager Gustavo Coleoni was the key to the strategy, which allowed for high pressure. River Plate's first opportunity arose in the 11th minute, when Javier Pinola headed over the crossbar a Ignacio Fernández corner kick. They had another chance following a filtered pass from Exequiel Palacios, which Rafael Santos Borré was unable to control. Central Córdoba responded shortly after, as a Gervasio Núñez shot from afar forced goalkeeper Franco Armani into a save. In the 23rd minute, Ignacio Scocco unveiled a shot from close range which was blocked by an opposing defender. The subsequent rebound fell to Palacios, but his effort went over the woodwork. Minutes later, Jonathan Herrera had the chance to open the scoring for Central Córdoba, as he found himself with only Armani to beat. The goalkeeper successfully defended his shot, however, and thus the score remained. The deadlock was eventually broken a half-hour into the game through Scocco, stemming from an individual play in which the River Plate striker controlled the ball and immediately turned on his markers. He was then left one-on-one with goalkeeper Diego Rodríguez, who managed to save his initial shot, but was unable to follow up on the rebound. No other goals were scored in the first half as it came to a closing.

==== Second half ====
During half-time, Central Córdoba's Coleoni called midfielder Núñez to leave the field for striker Joao Rodríguez. He further rearranged his team ten minutes from the restart, when defender Ismael Quílez was replaced by forward Franco Cristaldo. Nonetheless, River Plate had a chance to extend their lead at the 60-minute mark, but Scocco's header went wide of the goal. Five minutes later, coach Marcelo Gallardo made a substitution of his own, when he subbed Julián Alvarez in for fellow striker Borré. They would extend their lead shortly after, as a result of a one-two passing play between Fernández and Scocco that gave way to the midfielder scoring their second goal. They added one more just four minutes later, following another team effort, mainly led by Fernández, which resulted in a finish by Alvarez. Central Córdoba attempted to pull one back through Alzugaray in the 75th minute, and through two consecutive shots from Herrera and Nicolás Miracco in the 78th, but were unsuccessful. As no further efforts were to be had by either side, the match concluded with a 3–0 victory for River Plate, who were subsequently crowned champions of the Copa Argentina for a third time.

=== Details ===
December 13, 2019
21:10 UTC−3

Central Córdoba (SdE)	0–3	River Plate
	Report	Scocco 30'; Fernández 67'; Álvarez 71'

Estadio Malvinas Argentinas, Mendoza
Attendance: 40,000
Referee: Facundo Tello

Central Córdoba (SdE)	River Plate

GK	1	(Argentina) Diego Rodríguez
RB	29	(Argentina) Ismael Quílez		(substituted off) 54'
CB	24	(Paraguay) Hugo Vera Oviedo	(yellow card) 34'
CB	4	(Argentina) Oscar Salomón
CB	3	(Argentina) Matías Nani
LB	12	(Argentina) Jonathan Bay
RM	15	(Argentina) Lisandro Alzugaray		(substituted off) 75'
CM	5	(Argentina) Cristian Vega (c)	(yellow card) 36'
CM	8	(Argentina) Marcelo Meli	(yellow card) 87'
LM	40	(Argentina) Gervasio Núñez		(substituted off) 46'
CF	35	(Argentina) Jonathan Herrera
Substitutes:
GK	23	(Argentina) Maximiliano Cavallotti
DF	6	(Argentina) Marcos Sánchez
MF	14	(Argentina) Juan Daniel Galeano
MF	21	(Argentina) Santiago Gallucci
MF	25	(Argentina) Franco Cristaldo		(substituted on) 54'
FW	30	(Argentina) Nicolás Miracco		(substituted on) 75'
FW	33	(Colombia) Joao Rodríguez		(substituted on) 46'
Manager:
(Argentina) Gustavo Coleoni

GK	1	(Argentina) Franco Armani
RB	29	(Argentina) Gonzalo Montiel
CB	28	(Argentina) Lucas Martínez Quarta
CB	22	(Argentina) Javier Pinola (c)
LB	20	(Argentina) Milton Casco
RM	26	(Argentina) Ignacio Fernández
CM	24	(Argentina) Enzo Pérez	(substituted off) 76'
CM	15	(Argentina) Exequiel Palacios	(substituted off) 79'
LM	11	(Uruguay) Nicolás De La Cruz
CF	32	(Argentina) Ignacio Scocco
CF	19	(Colombia) Rafael Santos Borré	(substituted off) 64'
Substitutes:
GK	25	(Argentina) Enrique Bologna
DF	4	(Argentina) Fabrizio Angileri
DF	6	(Chile) Paulo Díaz
MF	21	(Argentina) Cristian Ferreira
MF	23	(Argentina) Leonardo Ponzio	(substituted on) 76'
FW	9	(Argentina) Julián Álvarez	(substituted on) 64'
FW	27	(Argentina) Lucas Pratto	(substituted on) 79'
Manager:
(Argentina) Marcelo Gallardo

Man of the Match
Ignacio Fernández (River Plate)

Assistant referees
Gabriel Chade
Facundo Rodríguez
Fourth official
Pablo Echavarría

Match rules

- 90 minutes
- No extra-time
- Penalty shoot-out if necessary
- Seven named substitutes, of which up to three may be used

=== Statistics ===
Overall
Statistic	Central Córdoba (SdE)	River Plate
Goals scored	0	3
Total shots	10	11
Shots on target	7	6
Ball possession	31%	69%
Corner kicks	2	4
Fouls committed	26	7
Offsides	0	3
Yellow cards	3	0
Red cards	0	0

== Post-match ==
The match was Exequiel Palacios' last at River Plate, as he was set to join German team Bayer 04 Leverkusen starting 2020. Following the win, he stated with emotion: "I wanted to leave with another title, and it luckily happened." He further added: "River Plate is my home. I arrived when I was six or seven years old, and I’ve spent my whole life here [...] Thanks [to the fans] for the support you've shown me and my teammates. I'm hoping to make a return someday."

River Plate finished the 2019–20 Superliga Argentina in second place, and thus qualified to the 2021 Copa Libertadores. In turn, Central Córdoba could only manage an 18th place finish. It was the first time they were participating in the highest tier of Argentine football since 1971.

== See also ==
- 2018–19 Superliga Argentina
- 2019 Supercopa Argentina
- 2020 Copa Libertadores
