= Marcos Sánchez =

Marcos Sánchez may refer to:

- Marcos Sánchez (basketball), Chilean basketball player
- Marcos Sánchez (footballer, born 1989), Panamanian midfielder
- Marcos Sánchez (footballer, born 1990), Argentine defender
- Marcos Sánchez (footballer, born 2003), Spanish defender
