= Oscar Salomón =

Oscar Salomón may refer to:

- Oscar Salomón (footballer)
- Oscar Salomón (politician)
