= Nicolás Femia =

Argentine professional footballer

Personal information
- Full name: Nicolás Federico Femia
- Date of birth: 8 August 1996 (age 30)
- Place of birth: Buenos Aires, Argentina
- Height: 1.83 m (6 ft 0 in)
- Position: Attacking midfielder

Team information
- Current team: Alessandria
- Number: 20

Youth career
- Huracán

Senior career*
Years	Team	Apps	(Gls)
2016–2018	Huracán	0	(0)
2018–2019	Sacachispas	20	(3)
2019	Central Córdoba	2	(1)
2020	Villa Dálmine	2	(0)
2020–2022	Etar	25	(6)
2022–2023	Sarmiento	7	(1)
2023	Racing Córdoba	6	(0)
2024	Alessandria	11	(0)
2024	Zamora		
2025	Aguila		
- * Club domestic league appearances and goals as of 22:50, 3 May 2024 (UTC)

Nicolás Federico Femia (born 8 August 1996) is an Argentine professional footballer who plays as an attacking midfielder for Serie D club Alessandria.

== Career ==
Femia's senior career got underway with Huracán of the Primera División. He didn't make an appearance in the aforementioned competition, but did play in the Copa Argentina against Central Córdoba (R) on 18 July 2016; a late cameo in a 2–1 win. Two years later, in August 2018, Femia agreed a move to Primera B Metropolitana's Sacachispas. His debut arrived on 17 August versus Barracas Central, as Femia also scored his first goal as they drew 2–2. In total, twenty games and three goals, which included a brace over Deportivo Español, occurred. July 2019 saw Femia join newly promoted Primera División team Central Córdoba.

Femia netted on his top-flight bow versus Atlético Tucumán, as he secured Santiago del Estero's Central Córdoba their first three points in the Primera División for forty-eight years. He appeared just once more for the club, departing in January 2020 to Villa Dálmine of Primera B Nacional. Two appearances followed, prior to the season's curtailment due to the COVID-19 pandemic. On 29 September 2020, Femia completed a move to Bulgarian football with First Professional Football League side Etar; penning a two-year contract. His debut arrived in a 2–2 draw against CSKA Sofia on 4 October. He picked up an injury in training soon after.

On 20 January 2024, Femia joined Italian side Alessandria on a free transfer, signing a contract until the end of the season.

== Career statistics ==
As of 22 July 2021.

Appearances and goals by club, season and competition
Club	Season	League			Cup		League Cup		Continental		Other		Total	
Club	Season	Division	Apps	Goals	Apps	Goals	Apps	Goals	Apps	Goals	Apps	Goals	Apps	Goals
Huracán	2016–17	Primera División	0	0	1	0	—		0	0	0	0	1	0
Huracán	2017–18	Primera División	0	0	0	0	—		0	0	0	0	0	0
Huracán	Total		0	0	1	0	—		0	0	0	0	1	0
Sacachispas	2018–19	Primera B Metropolitana	20	3	0	0	—		—		0	0	20	3
Central Córdoba	2019–20	Primera División	2	1	0	0	0	0	—		0	0	2	1
Villa Dálmine	2019–20	Primera B Nacional	2	0	0	0	—		—		0	0	2	0
Etar	2020–21	First League	6	0	0	0	—		—		0	0	6	0
Career total			30	4	1	0	0	0	0	0	0	0	31	4
