= Axel Pinto =

Argentine footballer

Personal information
- Date of birth: 18 September 2000 (age 26)
- Place of birth: Santiago del Estero, Argentina
- Height: 1.68 m (5 ft 6 in)
- Position: Midfielder

Team information
- Current team: Gimnasia Jujuy

Youth career
- 2015–2019: Central Córdoba SdE

Senior career*
Years	Team	Apps	(Gls)
2019–2022	Central Córdoba SdE	3	(0)
2022–2023	San Lorenzo de Alem	12	(3)
2023–2026	Sarmiento La Banda	64	(6)
2026–	Gimnasia Jujuy	2	(0)
- * Club domestic league appearances and goals as of 17:46, 28 April 2026 (UTC)

Axel Pinto (born 18 September 2000) is an Argentine professional footballer who plays as a midfielder for Gimnasia Jujuy.

== Career ==
Pinto's career began with Central Córdoba in 2015. Gustavo Coleoni moved him into the seniors during the 2018–19 campaign, appearing as a second-half substitute in a draw with Agropecuario on 23 February 2019. The club won promotion to the Primera División at the end of his first campaign.

== Career statistics ==
As of 3 July 2020.

Appearances and goals by club, season and competition
Club	Season	League			Cup		League Cup		Continental		Other		Total	
Club	Season	Division	Apps	Goals	Apps	Goals	Apps	Goals	Apps	Goals	Apps	Goals	Apps	Goals
Central Córdoba	2018–19	Primera B Nacional	2	0	0	0	—		—		0	0	2	0
Central Córdoba	2019–20	Primera División	0	0	0	0	—		—		0	0	0	0
Career total			2	0	0	0	—		—		0	0	2	0
