= Lautaro Robles =

Argentine footballer

Personal information
- Full name: Lautaro Damián Cosme Robles
- Date of birth: 26 July 1985 (age 41)
- Place of birth: Villaguay, Argentina
- Height: 1.75 m (5 ft 9 in)
- Position: Forward

Team information
- Current team: Defensores de Pronunciamiento

Youth career
- ADEV

Senior career*
Years	Team	Apps	(Gls)
- Barrio Norte de Gualeguay
2010–2011	ADEV		
2011–2017	Defensores de Pronunciamiento	115	(44)
2017–2018	Gimnasia y Esgrima	28	(10)
2018–2019	Central Córdoba	17	(1)
2019	Sarmiento	0	(0)
2020–	Defensores de Pronunciamiento	8	(3)
- * Club domestic league appearances and goals as of 00:15, 26 September 2020 (UTC)

Lautaro Damián Cosme Robles (born 26 July 1985) is an Argentine professional footballer who plays as a forward for Defensores de Pronunciamiento.

== Career ==
Robles played for ADEV's youth, prior to moving into senior football with clubs including ADEV and Barrio Norte de Gualeguay; who he left in 2010 to rejoin ADEV. In 2011, Robles joined Torneo Argentino B side Defensores de Pronunciamiento. He remained for six years and made one hundred and fifteen appearances whilst scoring forty-four goals in the fourth tier, either side of a season in Torneo Federal C. On 30 June 2017, after nineteen goals in his final two campaigns with Defensores de Pronunciamiento, Torneo Federal A side Gimnasia y Esgrima signed Robles. He scored ten times in 2017–18.

In June 2018, Robles completed a move to Central Córdoba of Primera B Nacional. His professional debut arrived on 2 September against Independiente Rivadavia, which preceded his first pro goal during a draw with Olimpo in the following November. After securing promotion with Central Córdoba, Robles departed in July 2019 to Sarmiento of Torneo Federal A. He scored goals against San Martín Formosa and Boca Unidos in five months with the club, prior to securing a return to Defensores de Pronunciamiento in January 2020. He netted a brace on debut in the cup versus Crucero del Norte.

== Career statistics ==
As of 26 September 2020.

Club statistics
Club	Season	League			Cup		League Cup		Continental		Other		Total	
Club	Season	Division	Apps	Goals	Apps	Goals	Apps	Goals	Apps	Goals	Apps	Goals	Apps	Goals
Defensores de Pronunciamiento	2016	Torneo Federal A	12	8	2	2	—		—		0	0	14	10
Defensores de Pronunciamiento	2016–17	Torneo Federal A	25	9	0	0	—		—		0	0	25	9
Defensores de Pronunciamiento	Total		37	17	2	2	—		—		0	0	39	19
Gimnasia y Esgrima	2017–18	Torneo Federal A	28	10	2	0	—		—		0	0	30	10
Central Córdoba	2018–19	Primera B Nacional	17	1	2	0	—		—		0	0	19	1
Sarmiento	2019–20	Torneo Federal A	8	2	0	0	—		—		0	0	8	2
Defensores de Pronunciamiento	2019–20	Torneo Federal A	8	3	2	2	—		—		0	0	10	5
Career total			98	33	8	4	—		—		0	0	106	37
