= Leonardo Villalba =

Argentine footballer

Personal information
- Full name: Leonardo Enrique Villalba
- Date of birth: 29 November 1994 (age 31)
- Place of birth: El Colorado, Argentina
- Height: 1.75 m (5 ft 9 in)
- Position: Winger

Team information
- Current team: Tristán Suárez

Youth career
- 2009–2013: Vélez Sarsfield

Senior career*
| Years | Team | Apps | (Gls) |
| 2013–2017 | Vélez Sarsfield | 18 | (0) |
| 2015–2016 | → Panionios (loan) | 17 | (1) |
| 2016–2017 | → Douglas Haig (loan) | 30 | (7) |
| 2017–2018 | Flandria | 12 | (0) |
| 2018–2019 | Defensa y Justicia | 0 | (0) |
| 2018–2019 | → Sarmiento (loan) | 28 | (4) |
| 2019 | Central Córdoba | 6 | (0) |
| 2020 | Lamia | 12 | (1) |
| 2021 | UTC Cajamarca | 22 | (1) |
| 2022– | Tristán Suárez | 9 | (0) |

International career
| 2011 | Argentina U17 | 6 | (0) |
- * Club domestic league appearances and goals as of 18:37, 4 August 2022 (UTC)

Leonardo Enrique Villalba (born 29 November 1994) is an Argentine professional footballer who plays as a winger for Tristán Suárez.

== Club career ==
Vélez Sarsfield signed Villalba in 2009. His first appearance in the Primera División arrived on 11 May 2013 against Arsenal de Sarandí, with Ricardo Gareca substituting him on for the final six minutes of a 2–2 draw. He was selected a further twenty-one times in the next three seasons in all competitions, with Villalba also netting his opening goal versus La Emilia in the Copa Argentina in April 2015. In the following July, Villalba was loaned to Super League Greece side Panionios. He remained for the entirety of 2015–16, making his debut in a victory over Panathinaikos in September before scoring against Panetolikos in October.

After twenty-six matches in Greek football, Villalba returned to his homeland with Primera B Nacional's Douglas Haig, on loan, in July 2016. Seven goals, which included a brace of Santamarina, occurred despite the club suffering relegation. Ahead of 2017–18, Villalba switched Vélez Sarsfield for Flandria. He made his bow in a fixture with Juventud Unida on 17 September 2017. Eleven months later, in mid-2018, Villalba moved to the Primera División's Defensa y Justicia. However, he was immediately loaned down to the second tier with Sarmiento. He scored three goals in his first fifteen games for the Junín team.

In July 2019, Villalba penned terms with newly promoted Primera División outfit Central Córdoba. Six appearances followed, though just one was as a starter as he left five months after joining. January 2020 saw Villalba complete a return to Greece with Super League team Lamia. He netted once in the league, which occurred on 8 June during a fixture with Panetolikos; the same opponents of his only goal for Panionios in 2015–16. He also scored in a Greek Cup quarter-final defeat to Olympiacos in February. Villalba mutually terminated his Lamia contract on 14 December 2020.

On 4 January 2021, Villalba headed to Peru with UT Cajamarca; managed by Ricardo Gareca, who gave the winger his debut in senior football back in May 2013. He left the club at the end of 2021. In January 2022, Villalba returned to his homeland and joined Tristán Suárez.

== International career ==
In 2011, Villalba won six caps for Argentina at the South American U-17 Championship in Ecuador; as his nation finished third.

== Career statistics ==
As of 6 January 2021.

Appearances and goals by club, season and competition
| Club | Season | League | | | Cup | | League Cup | | Continental | | Other | | Total | |
| Club | Season | Division | Apps | Goals | Apps | Goals | Apps | Goals | Apps | Goals | Apps | Goals | Apps | Goals |
|---|---|---|---|---|---|---|---|---|---|---|---|---|---|---|
| Vélez Sarsfield | 2012–13 | Argentine Primera División | 1 | 0 | 0 | 0 | — | | 0 | 0 | 0 | 0 | 1 | 0 |
| Vélez Sarsfield | 2013–14 | Argentine Primera División | 4 | 0 | 0 | 0 | — | | 2 (Note: Appearance(s) in the Copa Libertadores) | 0 | 0 | 0 | 6 | 0 |
| Vélez Sarsfield | 2014 | Argentine Primera División | 5 | 0 | 0 | 0 | — | | — | | 0 | 0 | 5 | 0 |
| Vélez Sarsfield | 2015 | Argentine Primera División | 8 | 0 | 1 | 1 | — | | — | | 1 (Note: Appearance(s) in the Argentine Primera División play-offs) | 0 | 10 | 1 |
| Vélez Sarsfield | 2016 | Argentine Primera División | 0 | 0 | 0 | 0 | — | | — | | 0 | 0 | 0 | 0 |
| Vélez Sarsfield | 2016–17 | Argentine Primera División | 0 | 0 | 0 | 0 | — | | — | | 0 | 0 | 0 | 0 |
| Vélez Sarsfield | Total | | 18 | 0 | 1 | 1 | — | | 2 | 0 | 1 | 0 | 22 | 1 |
| Panionios (loan) | 2015–16 | Super League Greece | 17 | 1 | 5 | 0 | — | | — | | 4 (Note: Appearance(s) in the Super League play-offs) | 0 | 26 | 1 |
| Douglas Haig (loan) | 2016–17 | Primera B Nacional | 30 | 7 | 1 | 0 | — | | — | | 0 | 0 | 31 | 7 |
| Flandria | 2017–18 | Primera B Nacional | 12 | 0 | 0 | 0 | — | | — | | 0 | 0 | 12 | 0 |
| Defensa y Justicia | 2018–19 | Argentine Primera División | 0 | 0 | 0 | 0 | 0 | 0 | 0 | 0 | 0 | 0 | 0 | 0 |
| Sarmiento (loan) | 2018–19 | Primera B Nacional | 28 | 4 | 0 | 0 | — | | — | | 0 | 0 | 28 | 4 |
| Central Córdoba | 2019–20 | Argentine Primera División | 6 | 0 | 0 | 0 | 0 | 0 | — | | 0 | 0 | 6 | 0 |
| Lamia | 2019–20 | Super League | 8 | 1 | 2 | 1 | — | | — | | 0 | 0 | 10 | 2 |
| Lamia | 2020–21 | Super League | 4 | 0 | 0 | 0 | — | | — | | 0 | 0 | 4 | 0 |
| Lamia | Total | | 12 | 1 | 2 | 1 | — | | — | | 0 | 0 | 14 | 2 |
| UT Cajamarca | 2021 | Peruvian Primera División | 6 | 0 | 0 | 0 | — | | 0 | 0 | 0 | 0 | 6 | 0 |
| Career total | | | 123 | 14 | 9 | 2 | 0 | 0 | 2 | 0 | 5 | 0 | 139 | 16 |
