= Francisco Manenti =

Argentine footballer

Personal information
- Date of birth: 31 October 1996 (age 30)
- Place of birth: Rosario, Argentina
- Height: 1.80 m (5 ft 11 in)
- Position: Centre-back

Team information
- Current team: Metropolitanos
- Number: 2

Youth career
- Newell's Old Boys

Senior career*
Years	Team	Apps	(Gls)
2019–	Newell's Old Boys	0	(0)
2019	→ Unión Comercio (loan)	9	(0)
2019–2020	→ Central Córdoba (loan)	5	(0)
2020	Villa Dálmine	4	(0)
2021–2022	12 de Octubre	35	(1)
2023–2024	San Miguel	53	(3)
2025	Mitre	8	(0)
2025	Zamora	11	(0)
2026–	Metropolitanos	3	(0)
- * Club domestic league appearances and goals as of 11 March 2026

Francisco Manenti (born 31 October 1996) is an Argentine professional footballer who plays as a centre-back for Venezuelan Primera División club Metropolitanos.

== Career ==
Manenti began his career with Newell's Old Boys. A loan move to Unión Comercio of the Peruvian Primera División was completed on 6 January 2019. He was selected to start a league fixture with Universitario on 17 February, manager Marcelo Vivas allowed him to play fifty-nine minutes of a 1–1 draw before substituting him off for José Rivera. In total, he appeared nine times for the Peruvian club. Upon returning to Argentina, Manenti was loaned out again by Newell's as he agreed terms with newly promoted Argentine Primera División team Central Córdoba. Five appearances followed.

== Career statistics ==
As of 27 August 2020.

Appearances and goals by club, season and competition
Club	Season	League			Cup		League Cup		Continental		Other		Total	
Club	Season	Division	Apps	Goals	Apps	Goals	Apps	Goals	Apps	Goals	Apps	Goals	Apps	Goals
Newell's Old Boys	2018–19	Argentine Primera División	0	0	0	0	0	0	—		0	0	0	0
Newell's Old Boys	2019–20	Argentine Primera División	0	0	0	0	0	0	—		0	0	0	0
Newell's Old Boys	Total		0	0	0	0	0	0	—		0	0	0	0
Unión Comercio (loan)	2019	Peruvian Primera División	9	0	0	0	—		—		0	0	9	0
Central Córdoba (loan)	2019–20	Argentine Primera División	5	0	3	0	0	0	—		0	0	8	0
Career total			14	0	3	0	0	0	—		0	0	17	0
