= Francisco Dutari =

Argentine footballer (born 1988)

Personal information
- Full name: Francisco Dutari
- Date of birth: 3 March 1988 (age 38)
- Place of birth: Córdoba, Argentina
- Height: 1.86 m (6 ft 1 in)
- Position: Center back

Senior career*
Years	Team	Apps	(Gls)
2008–2010	Godoy Cruz	53	(1)
2011	→ Talleres (loan)		
2011–2012	Atlético Rafaela	10	(0)
2012–2013	Atlético Tucumán	22	(2)
2013	Everton	10	(0)
2014	Rosario Central	0	(0)
2014–2017	UNAM	2	(0)
2015–2017	→ Sarmiento (loan)	53	(0)
2017–2018	Guillermo Brown	19	(1)
2018–2019	Central Córdoba	5	(0)
2019–2020	Sektzia Ness Ziona	23	(0)
2020–2021	Estudiantes (RC)	8	(0)
2022	Hapoel Ramat HaSharon	10	(0)
- * Club domestic league appearances and goals as of 1 June 2022

Francisco "Pancho" Dutari (born 3 March 1988) is an Argentine footballer, currently playing for Hapoel Ramat HaSharon in the Liga Leumit.

== Career ==
=== Argentina ===
He played in the lower divisions of Godoy Cruz, where he played until 2010, when he was transferred to Talleres for the second half of the season. Afterwards, he was loaned during the 2011/12 season to Atlético de Rafaela but did not get much playing time. In July 2012, he signed a contract with Atlético Tucumán. In 2014, he returned to play with Rosario Central.

=== Abroad ===
In 2013, he played his first season abroad for Everton (Chile) in the Primera División de Chile as a backup defender.

In July 2014, he was transferred to Pumas of Mexico.
