= Matías Pato =

Argentine footballer

Personal information
- Full name: Matías José Pato
- Date of birth: 4 September 1992 (age 34)
- Place of birth: Argentina
- Position: Forward

Senior career*
Years	Team	Apps	(Gls)
2013–	Central Córdoba	95	(11)
2018–2019	→Chaco For Ever (loan)	19	(1)
- * Club domestic league appearances and goals as of 5 April 2020

Matías José Pato (born 4 September 1992) is an Argentine professional footballer who plays as a forward for Central Córdoba.

== Professional career ==
Pato made his professional debut with Central Córdoba in a 1-0 Primera B Nacional win over Villa Dálmine on 13 February 2015.
