= Mauro Barraza =

Argentine professional footballer

Personal information
- Full name: Mauro Alejandro Barraza
- Date of birth: 15 May 1996 (age 30)
- Place of birth: Santiago del Estero, Argentina
- Height: 1.77 m (5 ft 10 in)
- Position: Midfielder

Team information
- Current team: Sol de América

Youth career
- Central Córdoba

Senior career*
| Years | Team | Apps | (Gls) |
| 2014–2021 | Central Córdoba | 21 | (0) |
| 2020 | → Central Norte (loan) | 6 | (0) |
| 2021 | JJ Urquiza | 11 | (0) |
| 2023– | Sol de América | 9 | (0) |
- * Club domestic league appearances and goals as of 19:18, 5 June 2023 (UTC)

Mauro Alejandro Barraza (born 15 May 1996) is an Argentine professional footballer who plays as a midfielder for Sol de América de Formosa.

== Career ==
Barraza's career began with Central Córdoba. Victor Riggio selected the midfielder for his senior debut on 19 October 2014, substituting him on after seventy-seven minutes as the club drew 4–4 with San Jorge. Central Córdoba ended the 2014 Torneo Federal A campaign with promotion to Primera B Nacional, which allowed Barraza to make his professional bow in February 2015 against Villa Dálmine. He made twenty-two appearances over the next five years as they went back to Torneo Federal A before eventually reaching the Primera División; his top-flight bow came away to Newell's Old Boys on 28 July 2019.

January 2020 saw Barraza join third tier team Central Norte on loan. He was selected in six matches, before the campaign was ended due to the COVID-19 pandemic.

== Career statistics ==
As of 25 October 2020.

Club statistics
| Club | Season | League | | | Cup | | League Cup | | Continental | | Other | | Total | |
| Club | Season | Division | Apps | Goals | Apps | Goals | Apps | Goals | Apps | Goals | Apps | Goals | Apps | Goals |
|---|---|---|---|---|---|---|---|---|---|---|---|---|---|---|
| Central Córdoba | 2014 | Torneo Federal A | 1 | 0 | 1 | 0 | — | | — | | 0 | 0 | 2 | 0 |
| Central Córdoba | 2015 | Primera B Nacional | 1 | 0 | 0 | 0 | — | | — | | 0 | 0 | 1 | 0 |
| Central Córdoba | 2016 | Primera B Nacional | 5 | 0 | 0 | 0 | — | | — | | 0 | 0 | 5 | 0 |
| Central Córdoba | 2016–17 | Primera B Nacional | 3 | 0 | 0 | 0 | — | | — | | 0 | 0 | 3 | 0 |
| Central Córdoba | 2017–18 | Torneo Federal A | 2 | 0 | 2 | 0 | — | | — | | 0 | 0 | 4 | 0 |
| Central Córdoba | 2018–19 | Primera B Nacional | 7 | 0 | 0 | 0 | — | | — | | 0 | 0 | 7 | 0 |
| Central Córdoba | 2019–20 | Primera División | 2 | 0 | 1 | 0 | — | | — | | 0 | 0 | 3 | 0 |
| Central Córdoba | Total | | 21 | 0 | 4 | 0 | — | | — | | 0 | 0 | 25 | 0 |
| Central Norte (loan) | 2019–20 | Torneo Federal A | 6 | 0 | 2 | 0 | — | | — | | 0 | 0 | 8 | 0 |
| Career total | | | 27 | 0 | 6 | 0 | — | | — | | 0 | 0 | 33 | 0 |

== Honours ==
Central Córdoba

- Torneo Federal A: 2017–18
