= Oscar Salomón (footballer) =

Argentine footballer

Personal information
- Full name: Oscar Camilo Salomón
- Date of birth: 22 March 1999 (age 27)
- Place of birth: San Miguel de Tucumán, Argentina
- Height: 1.81 m (5 ft 11 in)
- Position: Centre-back

Team information
- Current team: Newell's Old Boys
- Number: 22

Youth career
- Centro De Educación Física Nº18
- 2012–2019: Boca Juniors

Senior career*
Years	Team	Apps	(Gls)
2019–2026	Boca Juniors	0	(0)
2019–2021	→ Central Córdoba SdE (loan)	47	(1)
2022	→ Tigre (loan)	10	(0)
2023	→ Montevideo City (loan)	29	(0)
2024–2025	→ Platense (loan)	43	(1)
2026–	Newell's Old Boys	8	(2)

International career
2018	Argentina U20		
- * Club domestic league appearances and goals as of 17:30, 8 May 2026 (UTC)

Oscar Camilo Salomón (born 22 March 1999) is an Argentine professional footballer who plays as a centre-back for Newell's Old Boys.

== Club career ==
Salomón's youth career started with Centro De Educación Física Nº18, with whom he notably won the Gothia Cup with; which was followed by a move to Boca Juniors in 2012. On 1 August 2019, Salomón agreed to join newly promoted Primera División team Central Córdoba on loan. After being an unused substitute in the league against Talleres on 16 August, the defender appeared for his professional debut on 21 August in a Copa Argentina victory versus All Boys; featuring for forty-five minutes, prior to Francisco Manenti coming on in his place.

In January 2022, Salomón was loaned out to Tigre until the end of 2022.

== International career ==
Salomón represented Argentina's U20s at the 2018 South American Games in Bolivia, notably scoring in a semi-final loss to Uruguay. He also received a call-up to their U19s.

== Personal life ==
Salomón's father and grandfather were both footballers, his father Fabián played for San Martín while grandfather Oscar appeared for Central Norte.

== Career statistics ==
As of 22 August 2019.

Appearances and goals by club, season and competition
Club	Season	League			Cup		League Cup		Continental		Other		Total	
Club	Season	Division	Apps	Goals	Apps	Goals	Apps	Goals	Apps	Goals	Apps	Goals	Apps	Goals
Boca Juniors	2019–20	Primera División	0	0	0	0	0	0	0	0	0	0	0	0
Central Córdoba (loan)	2019–20	Primera División	0	0	1	0	0	0	—		0	0	1	0
Career total			0	0	1	0	0	0	0	0	0	0	1	0

== Honours ==
Platense

- Argentine Primera División: 2025 Apertura
