= Cristian Díaz (footballer, born 1989) =

Argentine footballer

Personal information
- Full name: Cristian Hernán Díaz
- Date of birth: 16 May 1989 (age 37)
- Place of birth: Villa Constitución, Argentina
- Height: 1.67 m (5 ft 6 in)
- Position: Right-back

Team information
- Current team: Mitre

Youth career
- Newell's Old Boys

Senior career*
Years	Team	Apps	(Gls)
2009–2015	Newell's Old Boys	81	(1)
2015	→ Banfield (loan)	1	(0)
2016–2017	Gimnasia y Esgrima	37	(2)
2017–2021	Central Córdoba SdE	67	(4)
2021	Güemes	6	(0)
2022–	Mitre	97	(5)
- * Club domestic league appearances and goals as of 17:27, 14 August 2025 (UTC)

Cristian Hernán Díaz (born 16 May 1989) is an Argentine professional footballer who plays as a right-back for Mitre.

== Career ==
Díaz's career began with Newell's Old Boys, with the defender's first professional appearance arriving on 3 July 2009 during a defeat to Racing Club. Fifty-five further appearances followed for the Argentine Primera División club, prior to Díaz scoring his opening senior goal in a home win over Vélez Sarsfield in March 2014. A year later, in February 2015, Díaz was loaned out to fellow Primera División side Banfield. He returned to his parent club eleven months later after being selected twice by Banfield. On 9 January 2016, Díaz joined Primera B Nacional's Gimnasia y Esgrima. He scored two goals across thirty-eight appearances for them.

Torneo Federal A side Central Córdoba completed the signing of Díaz in 2017. He scored goals against Douglas Haig, Defensores de Pronunciamiento, Defensores de Belgrano and Chaco For Ever as the club won promotion as champions to the second tier in his first season.

== Career statistics ==
As of 4 December 2018.

Club statistics
Club	Season	League			Cup (Note: Includes the Copa Argentina)		League Cup		Continental (Note: Includes the Copa Libertadores and Copa Sudamericana)		Other		Total	
Club	Season	Division	Apps	Goals	Apps	Goals	Apps	Goals	Apps	Goals	Apps	Goals	Apps	Goals
Newell's Old Boys	2008–09	Primera División	1	0	0	0	—		—		0	0	1	0
Newell's Old Boys	2009–10	Primera División	3	0	0	0	—		0	0	0	0	3	0
Newell's Old Boys	2010–11	Primera División	15	0	0	0	—		0	0	0	0	15	0
Newell's Old Boys	2011–12	Primera División	20	0	1	0	—		—		0	0	21	0
Newell's Old Boys	2012–13	Primera División	12	0	1	0	—		2 (Note: Two appearances in the 2013 Copa Libertadores)	0	1 (Note: One appearance in the 2012–13 Argentine Primera División play-offs)	0	16	0
Newell's Old Boys	2013–14	Primera División	15	1	1	0	—		0	0	0	0	16	1
Newell's Old Boys	2014	Primera División	15	0	1	0	—		—		0	0	16	0
Newell's Old Boys	2015	Primera División	0	0	0	0	—		—		0	0	0	0
Newell's Old Boys	Total		81	1	4	0	—		2	0	1	0	88	1
Banfield (loan)	2015	Primera División	1	0	1	0	—		—		0	0	2	0
Gimnasia y Esgrima	2016	Primera B Nacional	10	0	1	0	—		—		0	0	11	0
Gimnasia y Esgrima	2016–17	Primera B Nacional	27	2	0	0	—		—		0	0	27	2
Gimnasia y Esgrima	Total		37	2	1	0	—		—		0	0	38	2
Central Córdoba	2017–18	Torneo Federal A	27	4	2	0	—		—		0	0	29	4
Central Córdoba	2018–19	Primera B Nacional	11	0	4	0	—		—		0	0	15	0
Central Córdoba	Total		38	4	6	0	—		—		0	0	44	4
Career total			157	7	12	0	—		2	0	1	0	172	7

== Honours ==
Newell's Old Boys

- Argentine Primera División: 2012–13 Torneo Final

Central Córdoba

- Torneo Federal A: 2017–18
