= Nahuel Luján =

Argentine footballer

Personal information
- Full name: Nahuel Isaías Luján
- Date of birth: 23 August 1995 (age 31)
- Place of birth: Córdoba, Argentina
- Height: 1.78 m (5 ft 10 in)
- Position: Midfielder

Team information
- Current team: Sport Huancayo
- Number: 10

Youth career
- Belgrano

Senior career*
Years	Team	Apps	(Gls)
2014–2021	Belgrano	43	(1)
2016	→ Santamarina (loan)	9	(2)
2017–2018	→ Ferro Carril Oeste (loan)	20	(1)
2018–2019	→ Central Córdoba (loan)	24	(6)
2021–2023	Universidad de Chile	21	(0)
2022	→ Agropecuario (loan)	17	(1)
2023	→ San Felipe (loan)	29	(0)
2024	San Miguel	37	(2)
2025–	Sport Huancayo	31	(2)
- * Club domestic league appearances and goals as of 29 December 2025

Nahuel Isaías Luján (born 23 August 1995) is an Argentine professional footballer who plays as a midfielder for Sport Huancayo.

== Career ==
Luján began with Argentine Primera División side Belgrano, his debut for the club came on 11 May 2014 in a league draw with Arsenal de Sarandí. Two more appearances followed in the next two seasons for him before he left to join Primera B Nacional club Santamarina on loan. In his fifth game for Santamarina, Luján scored his first two career goals in a victory versus Ferro Carril Oeste. A year later, after eighteen games for both Santamarina and Belgrano, Luján joined Ferro Carril Oeste on loan for eighteen months. He went on to score four goals in forty matches in all competitions for Ferro Carril Oeste.

He was signed by Central Córdoba in August 2018.

In June 2022, he was loaned to Agropecuario from Universidad de Chile until the end of the year with an option to reloan.

== Career statistics ==
As of 7 September 2018.

Club statistics
Club	Season	League			Cup (Note: Includes the Copa Argentina)		League Cup		Continental (Note: Includes the Copa Sudamericana)		Other		Total	
Club	Season	Division	Apps	Goals	Apps	Goals	Apps	Goals	Apps	Goals	Apps	Goals	Apps	Goals
Belgrano	2013–14	Primera División	1	0	0	0	—		0	0	0	0	1	0
Belgrano	2014	Primera División	1	0	0	0	—		—		0	0	1	0
Belgrano	2015	Primera División	2	0	0	0	—		0	0	0	0	2	0
Belgrano	2016	Primera División	0	0	0	0	—		—		0	0	0	0
Belgrano	2016–17	Primera División	11	0	4	0	—		3 (Note: Three appearances in 2016 Copa Sudamericana)	1 (Note: One goal in 2016 Copa Sudamericana)	0	0	18	1
Belgrano	2017–18	Primera División	0	0	0	0	—		—		0	0	0	0
Belgrano	Total		15	0	4	0	—		3	1	0	0	22	1
Santamarina (loan)	2016	Primera B Nacional	18	3	0	0	—		—		0	0	18	3
Ferro Carril Oeste (loan)	2016–17	Primera B Nacional	20	3	1	0	—		—		0	0	21	3
Ferro Carril Oeste (loan)	2017–18	Primera B Nacional	19	1	0	0	—		—		0	0	19	1
Ferro Carril Oeste (loan)	Total		39	4	1	0	—		—		0	0	40	4
Central Córdoba	2018–19	Primera B Nacional	0	0	0	0	—		—		0	0	0	0
Career total			72	7	5	0	—		3	1	0	0	80	8
