= Leonel Ferroni =

Argentine professional footballer (born 1996)

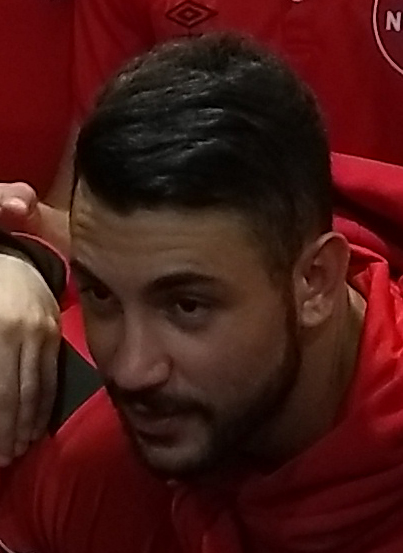

Personal information
- Date of birth: 29 January 1996 (age 30)
- Place of birth: Rosario, Argentina
- Height: 1.70 m (5 ft 7 in)
- Position: Left-back

Team information
- Current team: Intercity
- Number: 3

Youth career
- Malvinas Argentinas
- 2002–2017: Newell's Old Boys

Senior career*
| Years | Team | Apps | (Gls) |
| 2017–2020 | Newell's Old Boys | 19 | (0) |
| 2019–2020 | → Central Córdoba (loan) | 1 | (0) |
| 2020–2021 | Independiente Rivadavia | 18 | (0) |
| 2021–2023 | Intercity | 51 | (1) |
| 2023–2024 | Atlético Baleares | 25 | (1) |
| 2024–2025 | Unión Adarve | 25 | (1) |
| 2025– | Intercity | 32 | (1) |
- * Club domestic league appearances and goals as of 16 May 2026

Leonel Ferroni (born 29 January 1996) is an Argentine professional footballer who plays as a left-back for Spanish Segunda Federación club Intercity.

== Career ==
Ferroni was moved into the first-team of Newell's Old Boys, who signed him from Malvinas Argentinas in 2002, during the 2017–18 Argentine Primera División campaign, making his professional debut under manager Juan Manuel Llop during a 2–1 victory over Chacarita Juniors on 29 October 2017. In his second appearance a week later, Ferroni received a straight red card in a fixture with Patronato. In July 2019, Ferroni was loaned to newly promoted Primera División team Central Córdoba. His bow for the club arrived on 21 August in the Copa Argentina versus All Boys, though his league debut wouldn't come until November in a victory over Patronato. Those two appearances, which totalled ninety-five minutes, were his only two for them.

Ferroni wasn't taken into account by Central Córdoba in early January, with his loan deal eventually being terminated by the start of February. In August 2020, Independiente Rivadavia completed the signing of Ferroni.

== Career statistics ==
As of 29 September 2020.

Club statistics
| Club | Season | League | | | Cup | | League Cup | | Continental | | Other | | Total | |
| Club | Season | Division | Apps | Goals | Apps | Goals | Apps | Goals | Apps | Goals | Apps | Goals | Apps | Goals |
|---|---|---|---|---|---|---|---|---|---|---|---|---|---|---|
| Newell's Old Boys | 2017–18 | Primera División | 11 | 0 | 0 | 0 | — | | 1 (Note: Appearance(s) in the Copa Sudamericana) | 0 | 0 | 0 | 12 | 0 |
| Newell's Old Boys | 2018–19 | Primera División | 8 | 0 | 2 | 0 | 2 | 0 | — | | 0 | 0 | 12 | 0 |
| Newell's Old Boys | 2019–20 | Primera División | 0 | 0 | 0 | 0 | 0 | 0 | — | | 0 | 0 | 0 | 0 |
| Newell's Old Boys | 2020–21 | Primera División | 0 | 0 | 0 | 0 | 0 | 0 | — | | 0 | 0 | 0 | 0 |
| Newell's Old Boys | Total | | 19 | 0 | 2 | 0 | 2 | 0 | 1 | 0 | 0 | 0 | 24 | 0 |
| Central Córdoba (loan) | 2019–20 | Primera División | 1 | 0 | 1 | 0 | 0 | 0 | — | | 0 | 0 | 2 | 0 |
| Independiente Rivadavia (loan) | 2020–21 | Primera B Nacional | 0 | 0 | 0 | 0 | — | | — | | 0 | 0 | 0 | 0 |
| Career total | | | 20 | 0 | 3 | 0 | 2 | 0 | 1 | 0 | 0 | 0 | 26 | 0 |
