= Nicolás Correa =

Uruguayan footballer (born 1983)

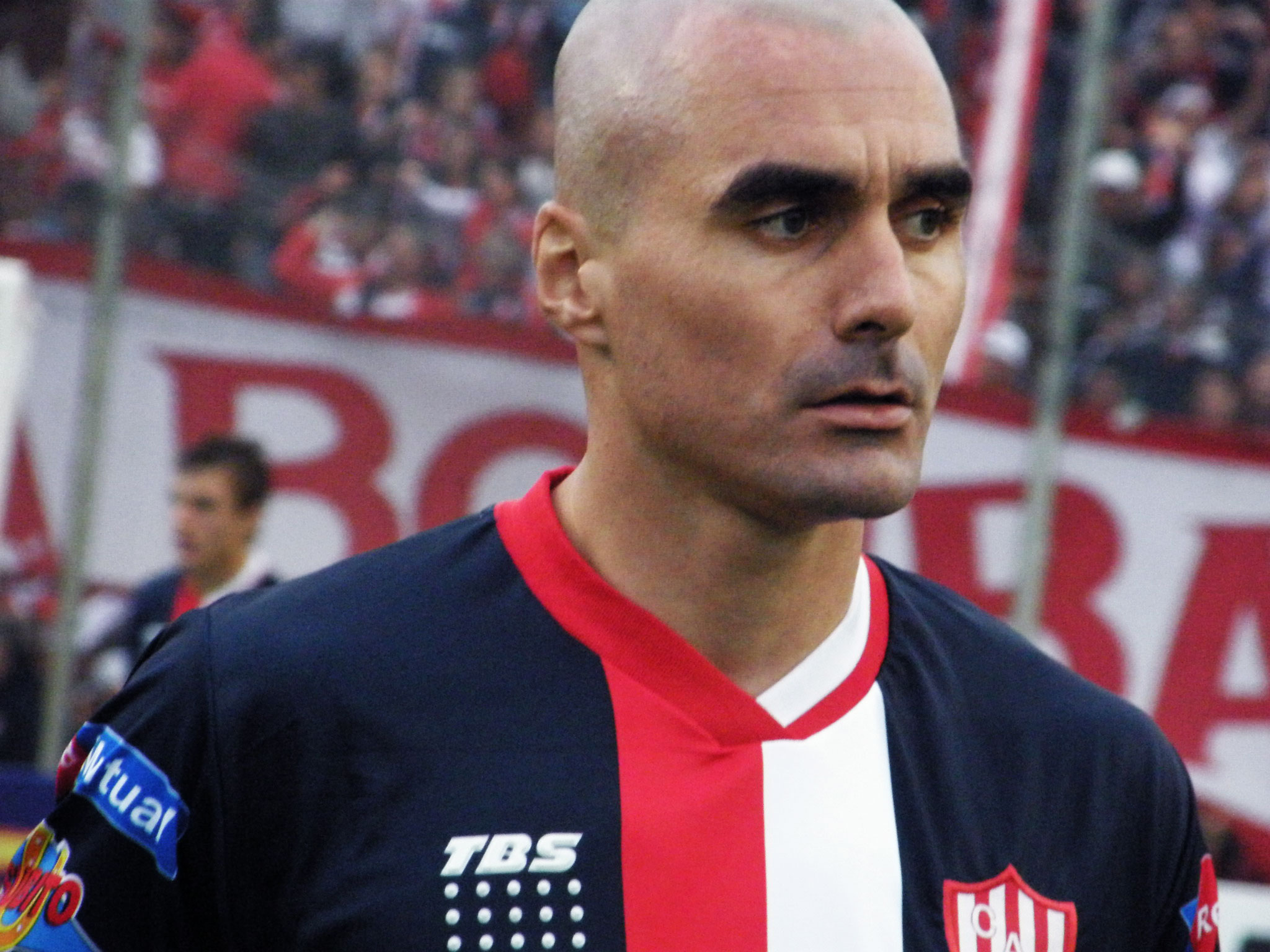
- Correa with Unión Santa Fe in 2009

Personal information
- Full name: Nicolás Correa Risso
- Date of birth: 25 December 1983 (age 42)
- Place of birth: Montevideo, Uruguay
- Height: 1.80 m (5 ft 11 in)
- Position: Centre back

Senior career*
Years	Team	Apps	(Gls)
2002–2004	Alianza Montevideo		
2005–2009	Liverpool Montevideo		
2009–2015	Unión Santa Fe	110	(14)
2014	→ Defensor (loan)	5	(0)
2015	Sarandí	7	(0)
2015–2016	Cerro	14	(2)
2016	Gimnasia (J)	20	(0)
2016–2019	Defensor Sporting	93	(4)
2019	Central Córdoba (SE)	6	(0)
2020–2021	Universidad de Concepción	29	(0)
2021	Defensor	16	(0)
2022	Central Español	25	(0)
2023–2024	Atlético Cuadril (seven-a-side)	–	(–)
- * Club domestic league appearances and goals

Nicolás Correa Risso (born 25 December 1983, in Montevideo) is a former Uruguayan footballer who played as a centre-back.

== Career ==
His last professional clubs were Defensor Sporting and Central Español in the Uruguayan Segunda División.

Following his retirement, Correa joined the seven-a-side football club Atlético Cuadril, where he coincided with Sergio Agüero.
