= Matías Nani =

Argentine footballer

Personal information
- Full name: Matías Germán Nani
- Date of birth: 26 March 1998 (age 28)
- Place of birth: Pozo del Molle, Argentina
- Height: 1.89 m (6 ft 2 in)
- Position: Centre-back

Team information
- Current team: Al-Sailiya (on loan from Al-Gharafa)
- Number: 25

Youth career
- Argentinos Juniors
- Lanús
- 2017: Roma

Senior career*
| Years | Team | Apps | (Gls) |
| 2017–2020 | Roma | 0 | (0) |
| 2017–2018 | → Temperley (loan) | 15 | (0) |
| 2018–2019 | → Belgrano (loan) | 9 | (0) |
| 2019–2020 | → Central Córdoba (loan) | 19 | (0) |
| 2020–2021 | Unión Santa Fe | 11 | (0) |
| 2021–2025 | Al-Shamal | 66 | (5) |
| 2024–2025 | → Al-Gharafa (loan) | 8 | (0) |
| 2025– | Al-Gharafa | 0 | (0) |
| 2025– | → Al-Sailiya (loan) | 3 | (0) |

International career
| 2016 | Argentina U20 | 2 | (0) |
- * Club domestic league appearances and goals as of 15:32, 9 May 2024 (UTC)

Matías Germán Nani (born 26 March 1998) is an Argentine professional footballer who plays as a centre-back for Al-Sailiya, on loan from Al-Gharafa in Qatar.

== Club career ==
Nani had a youth spell in the systems of Argentinos Juniors and Lanús, featuring for the latter at the 2016 U-20 Copa Libertadores in Paraguay. In 2017, Serie A side Roma completed the signing of Nani. He made his unofficial debut for the club in a pre-season friendly win over Pinzolo Campiglio on 11 July 2017, prior to playing again days later versus 1. FC Slovácko. In the following month, on 16 August, Nani was loaned to Temperley of the Argentine Primera División. He made his professional debut over a week after during a home defeat to River Plate. He featured a total of fifteen times for them in 2017–18.

On 11 July 2018, Nani was signed on loan by Belgrano. His first appearances came in the succeeding October against Banfield and Vélez Sarsfield, on the way to nine total matches for the Córdoba-based outfit as they suffered relegation to Primera B Nacional. In July 2019, Nani returned to his homeland for a third loan away from Roma – as he agreed terms with newly promoted Primera División team Central Córdoba. Twenty-three appearances came, as did his first senior goal after he netted in a Copa de la Superliga loss to Newell's Old Boys on 15 March 2020; his last game before the COVID-enforced break.

In October 2020, Nani completed a permanent move back to Argentina with Unión Santa Fe.

== International career ==
Nani represented the Argentina U20s at the 2016 COTIF Tournament in Spain. He won two caps, against Venezuela in the semi-finals and against Spain in the final; receiving a sending off in a 3–1 loss.

== Career statistics ==
As of 2 December 2020.

Club statistics
| Club | Season | League | | | Cup | | League Cup | | Continental | | Other | | Total | |
| Club | Season | Division | Apps | Goals | Apps | Goals | Apps | Goals | Apps | Goals | Apps | Goals | Apps | Goals |
|---|---|---|---|---|---|---|---|---|---|---|---|---|---|---|
| Roma | 2017–18 | Serie A | 0 | 0 | 0 | 0 | — | | 0 | 0 | 0 | 0 | 0 | 0 |
| Roma | 2018–19 | Serie A | 0 | 0 | 0 | 0 | — | | 0 | 0 | 0 | 0 | 0 | 0 |
| Roma | 2019–20 | Serie A | 0 | 0 | 0 | 0 | — | | 0 | 0 | 0 | 0 | 0 | 0 |
| Roma | Total | | 0 | 0 | 0 | 0 | — | | 0 | 0 | 0 | 0 | 0 | 0 |
| Temperley (loan) | 2017–18 | Primera División | 15 | 0 | 0 | 0 | — | | — | | 0 | 0 | 15 | 0 |
| Belgrano (loan) | 2018–19 | Primera División | 9 | 0 | 0 | 0 | 0 | 0 | — | | 0 | 0 | 9 | 0 |
| Central Córdoba (loan) | 2019–20 | Primera División | 19 | 0 | 3 | 0 | 1 | 1 | — | | 0 | 0 | 23 | 1 |
| Unión Santa Fe | 2020–21 | Primera División | 2 | 0 | 0 | 0 | 0 | 0 | 2 (Note: Appearance(s) in the Copa Sudamericana) | 0 | 0 | 0 | 4 | 0 |
| Career total | | | 45 | 0 | 3 | 0 | 1 | 1 | 2 | 0 | 0 | 0 | 51 | 1 |
