= Leandro Requena =

Argentine footballer

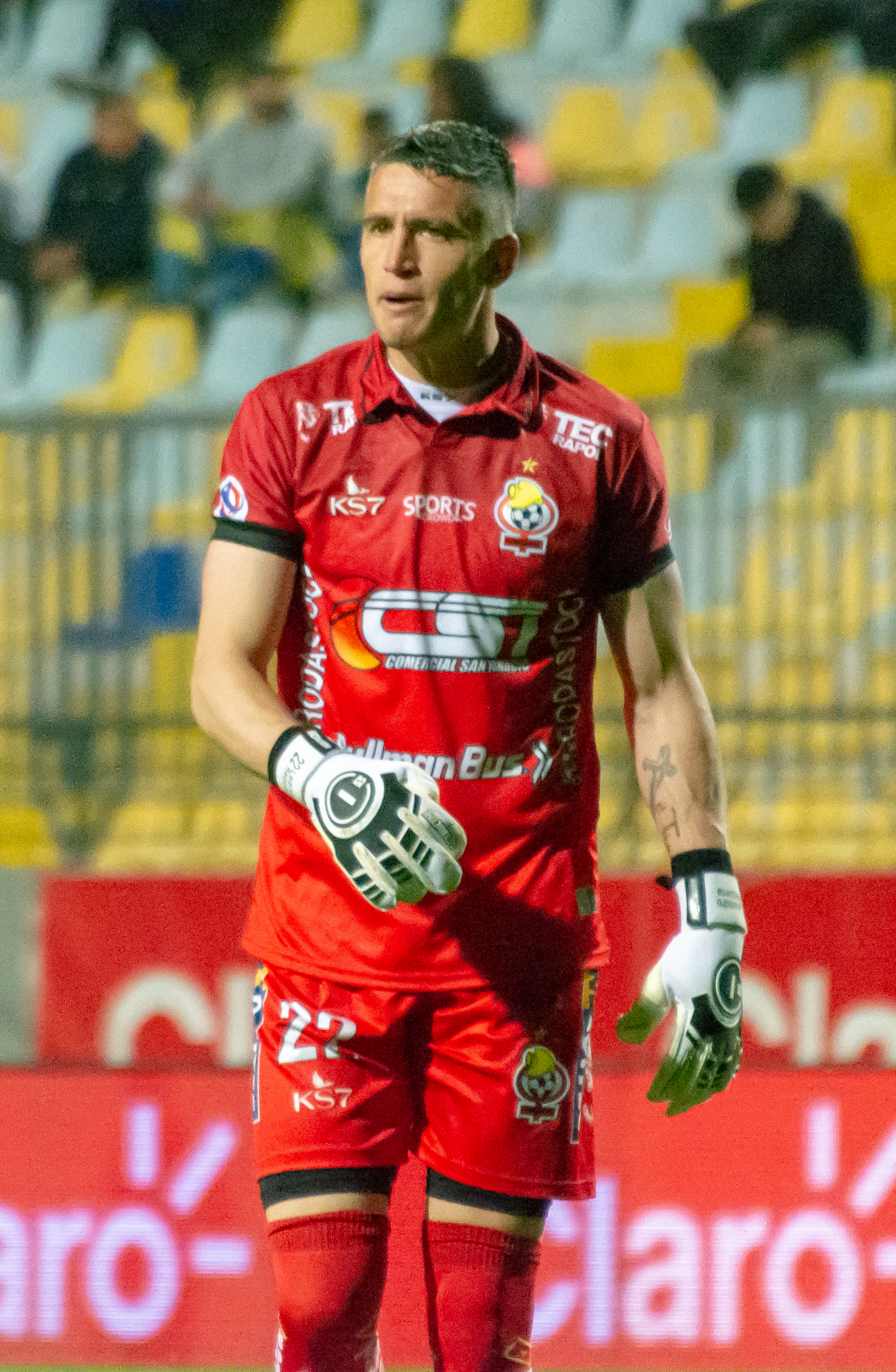
- Requena with Cobresal in 2023

Personal information
- Full name: Leandro Daniel Requena
- Date of birth: 11 September 1987 (age 39)
- Place of birth: Malagueño, Argentina
- Height: 1.86 m (6 ft 1 in)
- Position: Goalkeeper

Team information
- Current team: Brujas de Salamanca

Youth career
- 1993–1996: Deportivo Yocsina
- Talleres

Senior career*
Years	Team	Apps	(Gls)
2006–2014	Talleres	28	(0)
2007	→ Sportivo Patria (loan)	9	(0)
2013	→ Atenas (loan)	12	(0)
2014	→ Sportivo Patria (loan)	14	(0)
2015	Santamarina	41	(0)
2016	Crucero del Norte	15	(0)
2016–2017	Ferro Carril Oeste	5	(0)
2017–2018	Nueva Chicago	19	(0)
2018–2019	Los Andes	22	(0)
2019	Central Córdoba SdE	0	(0)
2020–2024	Cobresal	135	(1)
2025	Deportes Iquique	27	(0)
2026–	Brujas de Salamanca	0	(0)
- * Club domestic league appearances and goals as of 17 February 2026

Leandro Daniel Requena (born 11 September 1987) is an Argentine professional footballer who plays as a goalkeeper for Chilean club Brujas de Salamanca.

== Career ==
Requena had a youth stint with Deportivo Yocsina, before joining Talleres with whom he began his senior career in 2006. He made twenty-eight league appearances for the club during his eight-year stay, including appearing in five games in the 2012–13 Torneo Argentino A. While with Talleres, Requena was loaned out on three occasions - twice to Sportivo Patria in the third tier. On 19 August 2013, Requena was loaned to Uruguayan Segunda División side Atenas. He departed midway through the 2013–14 campaign after twelve appearances, with his final match being a 2–1 defeat to Rampla Juniors on 14 December 2013.

Santamarina completed the permanent signing of Requena in January 2015. After participating in forty-five fixtures as Santamarina lost in the promotion play-offs to Patronato, Requena moved across Primera B Nacional with Crucero del Norte in January 2016 before having further stints with Ferro Carril Oeste and Nueva Chicago in the succeeding two years. 2018 saw Requena join Los Andes. He made his debut on 16 September in a home loss to Sarmiento at the Estadio Eduardo Gallardón.

He scored one of the longest goals in soccer's history in Chile on March 18, 2023, when his kick from his goal sent the ball all the way to the opposing side's goal without assistance, the ball bouncing once before flying over the head of the opposing goalkeeper, who was forwardly positioned and could not then stop it.

After five seasons with Cobresal in Chile, Requena switched to Deportes Iquique for the 2025 season.

In February 2026, Requena joined Brujas de Salamanca.

== Career statistics ==
As of 12 February 2019.

Appearances and goals by club, season and competition
Club	Season	League			Cup		Continental		Other		Total	
Club	Season	Division	Apps	Goals	Apps	Goals	Apps	Goals	Apps	Goals	Apps	Goals
Talleres	2012–13	Torneo Argentino A	5	0	2	0	—		0	0	7	0
Talleres	2013–14	Primera B Nacional	0	0	0	0	—		0	0	0	0
Talleres	2014	Torneo Federal A	0	0	0	0	—		0	0	0	0
Talleres	Total		5	0	2	0	—		0	0	7	0
Sportivo Patria	2007–08	Torneo Argentino A	9	0	0	0	—		0	0	9	0
Atenas	2013–14	Segunda División	12	0	0	0	—		0	0	12	0
Sportivo Patria	2014	Torneo Federal A	14	0	0	0	—		6 (Note: Appearance(s) in the Torneo Federal A play-offs)	0	20	0
Santamarina	2015	Primera B Nacional	41	0	1	0	—		4 (Note: Appearance(s) in the Primera B Nacional play-offs)	0	46	0
Crucero del Norte	2016	Primera B Nacional	15	0	0	0	—		0	0	15	0
Ferro Carril Oeste	2016–17	Primera B Nacional	5	0	1	0	—		0	0	6	0
Nueva Chicago	2017–18	Primera B Nacional	19	0	0	0	—		0	0	19	0
Los Andes	2018–19	Primera B Nacional	12	0	0	0	—		0	0	12	0
Career total			132	0	4	0	—		10	0	146	0

== Honours ==
Talleres

- Torneo Argentino A: 2012–13

== See also ==
- List of goalscoring goalkeepers
