= Jonathan Bay =

Argentine footballer (born 1993)

Personal information
- Full name: Aníbal Jonathan Gastón Bay
- Date of birth: 1 February 1993 (age 33)
- Place of birth: Villa Ángela, Argentina
- Height: 1.79 m (5 ft 10 in)
- Position: Left-back

Team information
- Current team: Racing Córdoba

Senior career*
Years	Team	Apps	(Gls)
2011–2013	Racing de Córdoba	42	(2)
2013–2014	Godoy Cruz	0	(0)
2015–2016	Talleres	11	(1)
2016–2018	Ferro Carril Oeste	47	(2)
2018–2022	Central Córdoba SdE	119	(3)
2023–2024	Instituto	40	(1)
2025–2026	Platense	6	(0)
2026–	Racing Córdoba	2	(0)
- * Club domestic league appearances and goals as of 16:58, 4 May 2026 (UTC)

Aníbal Jonathan Gastón Bay (born 1 February 1993) is an Argentine professional footballer who plays as a left-back for Racing Córdoba.

== Career ==
Bay's career started with Racing de Córdoba in 2011, remaining with the Torneo Argentino A club for two seasons whilst netting two goals in forty-four games. On 30 June 2013, Bay joined Argentine Primera División side Godoy Cruz. He departed the club eighteen months later without featuring, subsequently securing a move to Torneo Federal A's Talleres. Six appearances followed in 2015 as Talleres won promotion to Primera B Nacional, which preceded a further five in the second tier as the club won a second straight promotion to the Primera División; Bay scored their campaign's final goal, versus Chacarita Juniors on 18 June 2016.

In July 2016, Bay agreed to remain in Primera B Nacional with Ferro Carril Oeste. Gustavo Coleoni selected the defender for his debut in a match with Central Córdoba on 27 August, the first of forty-seven matches he participated in for Ferro across two years; scoring goals against Instituto and San Martín in the process. In 2018, Bay was signed by Central Córdoba.

== Career statistics ==
As of 3 December 2018.

Club statistics
Club	Season	League			Cup (Note: Includes the Copa Argentina)		League Cup		Continental (Note: Includes the Copa Sudamericana)		Other		Total	
Club	Season	Division	Apps	Goals	Apps	Goals	Apps	Goals	Apps	Goals	Apps	Goals	Apps	Goals
Racing de Córdoba	2011–12	Torneo Argentino A	19	0	0	0	—		—		0	0	19	0
Racing de Córdoba	2012–13	Torneo Argentino A	23	2	1	0	—		—		1 (Note: One appearance in the 2012–13 Torneo Argentino A play-offs)	0	25	2
Racing de Córdoba	Total		42	2	1	0	—		—		1	0	44	2
Godoy Cruz	2013–14	Primera División	0	0	0	0	—		—		0	0	0	0
Godoy Cruz	2014	Primera División	0	0	0	0	—		0	0	0	0	0	0
Godoy Cruz	Total		0	0	0	0	—		0	0	0	0	0	0
Talleres	2015	Torneo Federal A	6	0	0	0	—		—		0	0	6	0
Talleres	2016	Primera B Nacional	5	1	2	0	—		—		0	0	7	1
Talleres	Total		11	1	2	0	—		—		0	0	13	1
Ferro Carril Oeste	2016–17	Primera B Nacional	33	2	0	0	—		—		0	0	33	2
Ferro Carril Oeste	2017–18	Primera B Nacional	14	0	0	0	—		—		0	0	14	0
Ferro Carril Oeste	Total		47	2	0	0	—		—		0	0	47	2
Central Córdoba	2018–19	Primera B Nacional	5	0	3	0	—		—		0	0	8	0
Career total			105	5	6	0	—		0	0	1	0	112	5

== Honours ==
Talleres

- Torneo Federal A: 2015
- Primera B Nacional: 2016

Platense

- Argentine Primera División: 2025 Apertura
