= Emir Izaguirre =

Argentine footballer

Personal information
- Full name: Emir Ezequiel Izaguirre Brondi
- Date of birth: 26 January 1995 (age 31)
- Place of birth: Viale, Argentina
- Height: 1.83 m (6 ft 0 in)
- Position: Forward

Team information
- Current team: Ben Hur

Youth career
- Colón

Senior career*
Years	Team	Apps	(Gls)
2016	Viale FBC	14	(9)
2017	Ben Hur	1	(0)
2017	Atlético Tucumán	0	(0)
2018	Unión Aconquija	10	(3)
2018–2019	Central Córdoba	1	(0)
2019–	Ben Hur	2	(0)
- * Club domestic league appearances and goals as of 11:43, 12 July 2020 (UTC)

Emir Ezequiel Izaguirre Brondi (born 26 January 1995) is an Argentine professional footballer who plays as a forward for Ben Hur.

== Career ==
Izaguirre had a spell in the youth academy of Colón, though Viale FBC were the first senior club of his career - with the forward scoring nine goals in fourteen appearances across 2016 in Torneo Federal B. 2017 saw Izaguirre move across the division to Ben Hur, though he'd leave mid-year after one match after he was signed by Primera División side Atlético Tucumán. He only featured for their reserves, prior to leaving for Torneo Federal A's Unión Aconquija in 2018. He scored his first goal in February versus Deportivo Maipú, who he scored against again in the succeeding March. Unión suffered relegation to tier four in 2017–18.

Izaguirre joined Central Córdoba of Primera B Nacional in June 2018. He made his professional football bow for the Santiago del Estero club on 23 March 2019 during a victory away to Santamarina. Izaguirre was released in June 2019, with the forward subsequently rejoining Ben Hur in the succeeding December.

== Career statistics ==
As of 12 July 2020.

Appearances and goals by club, season and competition
Club	Season	League			Cup		League Cup		Continental		Other		Total	
Club	Season	Division	Apps	Goals	Apps	Goals	Apps	Goals	Apps	Goals	Apps	Goals	Apps	Goals
Ben Hur	2017	Torneo Federal B	1	0	0	0	—		—		0	0	1	0
Atlético Tucumán	2017–18	Primera División	0	0	0	0	—		0	0	0	0	0	0
Unión Aconquija	2017–18	Torneo Federal A	10	3	0	0	—		—		0	0	10	3
Central Córdoba	2018–19	Primera B Nacional	1	0	0	0	—		—		0	0	1	0
Ben Hur	2020	Federal Amateur	2	0	0	0	—		—		0	0	2	0
Career total			14	3	0	0	—		0	0	0	0	14	3
