= Pablo Barraza =

Argentine footballer

Personal information
- Full name: Pablo Agustín Barraza
- Date of birth: 4 May 2001 (age 25)
- Place of birth: Los Quiroga, Argentina
- Position: Forward

Team information
- Current team: Central Córdoba

Youth career
- Central Córdoba

Senior career*
Years	Team	Apps	(Gls)
2018–	Central Córdoba	2	(0)
- * Club domestic league appearances and goals as of 08:04, 7 December 2018 (UTC)

Pablo Agustín Barraza (born 4 May 2000) is an Argentine professional footballer who plays as a forward for Central Córdoba.

== Career ==
Barraza started his career in the ranks of Central Córdoba. He made his first senior appearance during the Torneo Federal A club's title-winning campaign of 2017–18, which won them promotion to Primera B Nacional for 2018–19; that saw Barraza make his professional bow on 1 October 2018 against Brown.

== Career statistics ==
As of 7 December 2018.

Club statistics
Club	Season	League			Cup (Note: Includes the Copa Argentina)		League Cup		Continental		Other		Total	
Club	Season	Division	Apps	Goals	Apps	Goals	Apps	Goals	Apps	Goals	Apps	Goals	Apps	Goals
Central Córdoba	2017–18	Torneo Federal A	1	0	0	0	—		—		0	0	1	0
Central Córdoba	2018–19	Primera B Nacional	1	0	0	0	—		—		0	0	1	0
Career total			2	0	0	0	—		—		0	0	2	0

== Honours ==
Central Córdoba

- Torneo Federal A: 2017–18
