= Emanuel Romero =

Argentine footballer

Personal information
- Full name: Emanuel Maximiliano Romero
- Date of birth: 23 March 1992 (age 34)
- Place of birth: Buenos Aires, Argentina
- Height: 1.83 m (6 ft 0 in)
- Position: Midfielder

Team information
- Current team: Atlético Paraná

Senior career*
Years	Team	Apps	(Gls)
2010–2012	Colegiales	47	(5)
2013–2014	Adelante		
2014–2015	El Linqueño	36	(1)
2015	Adelante		
2016	Sportivo Rivadavia	3	(0)
2016–2017	Unión Sunchales	25	(0)
2017–2020	Central Córdoba	33	(2)
2020	Sacachispas	0	(0)
2021–	Atlético Paraná		
- * Club domestic league appearances and goals

Emanuel Maximiliano Romero (born 23 March 1992) is an Argentine professional footballer who plays as a central midfielder for Andino.

== Career ==
Romero began his career in Torneo Argentino B with Colegiales, scoring five goals in forty-seven matches between 2010 and 2012. A move to Adelante followed in 2013, which preceded a stint with El Linqueño. He rejoined Adelante for the 2015 campaign, before moving to Sportivo Rivadavia a year later which saw the midfielder feature three times. Romero moved up to Torneo Federal A with Unión Sunchales on 10 July 2016. Thirty appearances followed. August 2017 saw Romero join Central Córdoba. They were promoted in 2017–18, with Romero making his pro debut in Primera B Nacional versus Brown on 1 October 2018.

In February, Romero suffered a ruptured anterior cruciate ligament in his left knee, which required a long recovery. Once he got available again, he didn't get the chance to play. Romero spent 16 months without official matches and on June 30, 2020, his contract expired and Romero left Central. In September 2020, Romero signed with Sacachispas. In 2021, he joined Atlético Paraná.

== Career statistics ==
As of 11 July 2020.

Club statistics
Club	Season	League			Cup		League Cup		Continental		Other		Total	
Club	Season	Division	Apps	Goals	Apps	Goals	Apps	Goals	Apps	Goals	Apps	Goals	Apps	Goals
Sportivo Rivadavia	2016	Torneo Federal B	3	0	0	0	—		—		0	0	3	0
Unión Sunchales	2016–17	Torneo Federal A	25	0	3	0	—		—		2 (Note: Appearance(s) in the Torneo Federal A play-offs)	0	30	0
Central Córdoba	2017–18	Torneo Federal A	27	1	1	0	—		—		0	0	28	1
Central Córdoba	2018–19	Primera B Nacional	6	1	4	0	—		—		0	0	10	1
Central Córdoba	Total		33	2	5	0	—		—		0	0	38	2
Career total			61	2	8	0	—		—		2	0	71	2

== Honours ==
Central Córdoba

- Torneo Federal A: 2017–18
