= Diego Jara =

Argentine footballer (born 1982)

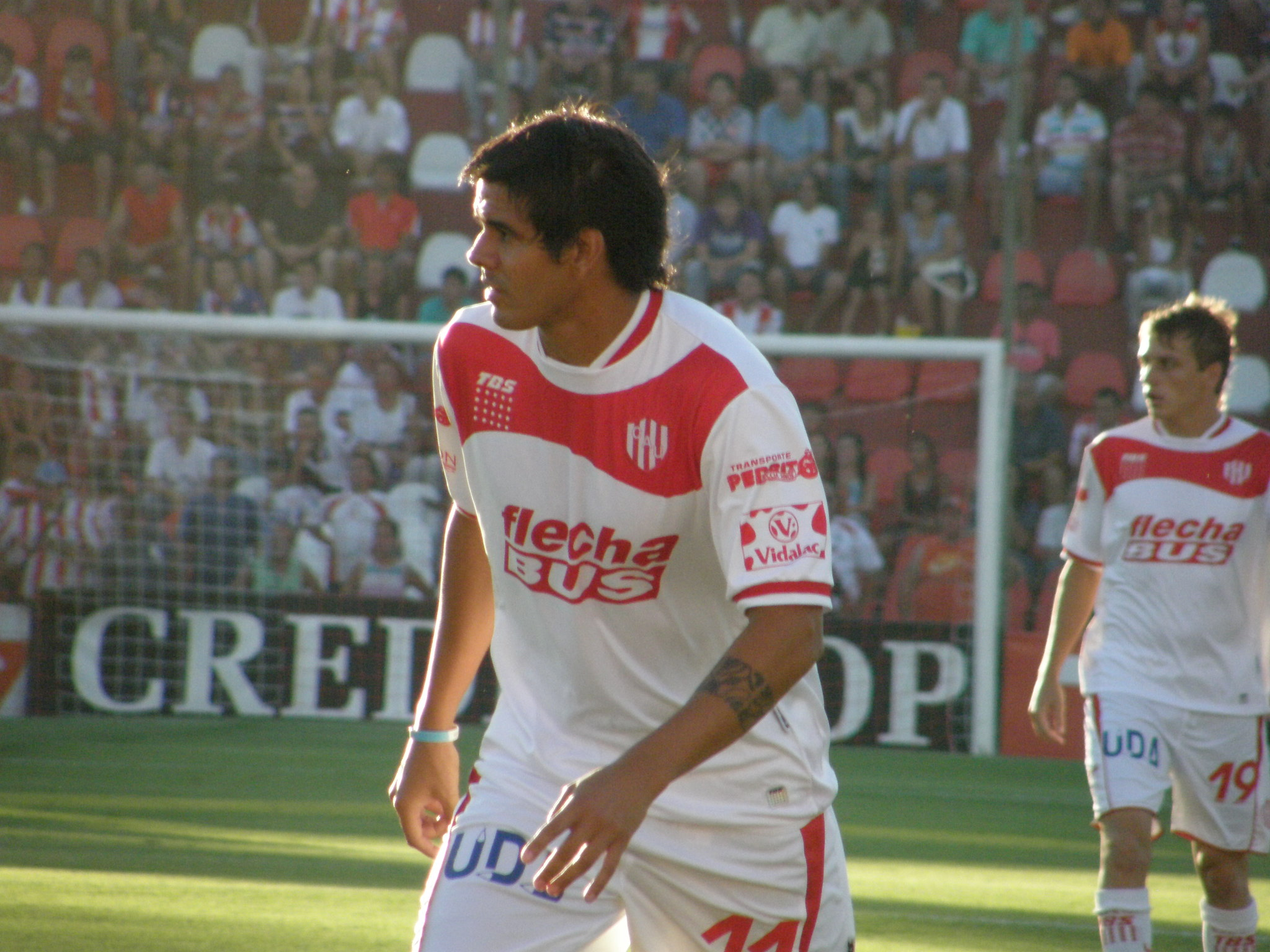

Personal information
- Full name: Diego Daniel Jara
- Date of birth: 4 October 1983 (age 43)
- Place of birth: Concordia, Argentina
- Height: 1.80 m (5 ft 11 in)
- Position: Forward

Team information
- Current team: Nicaragua U15 (assistant manager)

Senior career*
Years	Team	Apps	(Gls)
- CA Colegiales
2008–2011	Patronato	48	(18)
2012–2014	Santa Fe	39	(8)
2014	→ Atlético Tucumán (loan)	16	(3)
2014	Atlético Tucumán	0	(0)
2015	Patronato	36	(12)
2016	Atlético Venezuela	14	(4)
2016–2017	Instituto	14	(4)
2017–2019	Central Córdoba	21	(6)
2019	All Boys	4	(0)
2020	Club Gimnasia y Esgrima		
2021–2022	Racing Córdoba	38	(14)
2022–2023	Ben Hur		
2023–2024	CA Libertad		
Total		230	(69)

Managerial career
- 2026: Juventus Managua
- * Club domestic league appearances and goals

Diego Daniel Jara (born 4 October 1983) is an Argentine football coach and former footballer who serves as assistant manager for Nicaragua U15.

== Career ==
Jara was born in Concordia, Province of Entre Rios, Argentina. He started his career in Deportivo Las Heras but soon moved to Club Atlético Colegiales (Concordia), where he was top scorer and was Torneo Argentino B in 2007.

Board threw the eye, blew a Cruise North (Misiones) and hired him to replace another scorer, the Fool José Luis Marzo, an idol Tatengue. In the Torneo Argentino A, the tip was instrumental in the rise of 2009–10 (27 goals, top scorer) and then he felt the handover to the National B. He nailed 21 goals in a season and a half.

His performances made several clubs in Argentina and Europe brought him to the attention of Sporting CP, Olympus, Columbus, Newell's, River Plate, and others. Union eventually signed him for the Clausura 2012 tournament for the purchase of 80% of the pass to and transfer of Matías Quiroga for six months with an option to purchase, who after the transfer was transferred to Gimnasia La Plata. He signed a two-and-a-half-year contract with La Joya.

His first goal was scored against Racing, and he scored a goal in the classic Santa Fe for Union to achieve a draw after trailing 2–0 against Columbus.

== Clubs ==
- Deportivo Las Heras de Concordia: 2004
- Colegiales de Concordia: 2006–2008
- Patronato de Paraná: 2009–2011
- Unión de Santa Fe: 2012–2013
- Atlético Tucumán: 2014–?

== Career statistics ==
Appearances and goals by club, season and competition
Club	Season	League		National cup		Continentnal		Total	
Club	Season	Apps	Goals	Apps	Goals	Apps	Goals	Apps	Goals
Sportivo las Heras	2004	2	1					2	1
Colegiales (C)	2006–08	32	20					32	20
Patronato	2008–09	27	13					27	13
Patronato	2009–10	38	28					38	28
Patronato	2010–11	33	15					33	15
Patronato	2011–12	18	6					18	6
Patronato	Total	116	62	0	0	0	0	116	62
Unión de Santa Fe	Clausura 2012	17	4					17	4
Unión de Santa Fe	2012–13	19	3					19	3
Unión de Santa Fe	2013–14	13	2					13	2
Unión de Santa Fe	Total	49	9	0	0	0	0	49	9
Atlético Tucumán	2013–14	10	2					10	2
Total		215	94	0	0	0	0	209	94
