= Santiago Gallucci =

Argentine footballer

Personal information
- Full name: Santiago Alejandro Gallucci Otero
- Date of birth: 8 March 1991 (age 35)
- Place of birth: Ramallo, Argentina
- Height: 1.79 m (5 ft 10 in)
- Position: Midfielder

Team information
- Current team: Agropecuario

Youth career
- 2002–2011: River Plate

Senior career*
Years	Team	Apps	(Gls)
2011–2013	River Plate	0	(0)
2013–2015	Godoy Cruz	2	(0)
2015–2017	Douglas Haig	62	(0)
2017–2018	Unión Española	36	(0)
2018–2020	Central Córdoba	16	(0)
2020–2022	San Martín Tucumán	15	(0)
2022–2023	Douglas Haig	31	(0)
2023	General Caballero	6	(0)
2023–2025	All Boys	46	(0)
2025–2026	Patronato	34	(0)
2026–	Agropecuario	9	(0)

International career
2009–2010	Argentina U20		
- * Club domestic league appearances and goals as of 17:36, 21 April 2026 (UTC)

Santiago Alejandro Gallucci Otero (born 8 March 1991) is an Argentine footballer who plays as a midfielder for Agropecuario.

== Club career ==
Gallucci was born in Ramallo, Buenos Aires Province, and began his football career in the youth system of River Plate in 2002. He was selected for the Argentina under-20 team, and in mid-2011, was on the bench for the second leg of the playoff against Belgrano, which saw River relegated from the top division for the first time in their history. He took part in pre-season training with the first team under new manager Matías Almeyda, and was in the starting eleven for friendly matches, but fell out of favour and never made a senior appearance. He was allowed to travel to Spain for a trial with Villarreal that proved unsuccessful, and in 2013, his contract was cancelled by mutual consent.

He signed for Godoy Cruz, managed by Martín Palermo, as "one for the future". He made his first-team debut in August 2013 in the Copa Argentina, and his first Primera División appearance in the last match of the Torneo Inicial – Palermo's last match in charge – in December. After just one more first-team appearance, Gallucci moved on to Douglas Haig of the Primera B in February 2015. He played about half the matches in his first season – which he attributed to injury and then a change of coach – and then was used more regularly.

With Douglas Haig facing relegation from the 2016–17 Primera B, Martín Palermo signed Gallucci for Chilean Primera División club Unión Española. He started all but one match and was, according to El Mercurio's headline writer, "the brain that pulls the strings" as the team finished as runners-up in the 2017 Torneo de Transición.

== International career ==
Gallucci made several appearances for Argentina U20 while a River player. At the age of 18, he started the first two group matches at the 2009 Toulon Tournament, but was sent off in the second half of the semifinal as Argentina went out to France on penalties, so was unable to take part in the third-place match, in which Argentina beat the Netherlands with a last-minute goal. He continued in the side in 2010.
