= Juan Galeano =

Argentine footballer

Personal information
- Full name: Juan Daniel Galeano
- Date of birth: 3 July 1989 (age 37)
- Place of birth: Buenos Aires, Argentina
- Height: 1.70 m (5 ft 7 in)
- Position: Midfielder

Team information
- Current team: Atlanta

Youth career
- Atlanta

Senior career*
Years	Team	Apps	(Gls)
2010–2012	Atlanta	29	(3)
2012	Cobresal	13	(2)
2012–2013	Sarmiento	5	(0)
2013–2016	Atlanta	78	(10)
2016–2017	San Martín SJ	2	(0)
2017–2018	San Martín Tucumán	46	(7)
2018–2019	Aldosivi	15	(0)
2019–2021	Central Córdoba SdE	45	(1)
2022–2023	Atlanta	60	(16)
2024	Atlético Rafaela	29	(0)
2025–	Deportivo Madryn	1	(0)
- * Club domestic league appearances and goals as of 17:28, 3 August 2025 (UTC)

Juan Daniel Galeano (born 3 July 1989) is an Argentine professional footballer currently playing for Deportivo Madryn.
