= Ismael Quílez =

Argentine footballer

Personal information
- Full name: Ismael Alberto Quílez
- Date of birth: 2 October 1988 (age 38)
- Place of birth: Santa Fe, Argentina
- Height: 1.72 m (5 ft 8 in)
- Position: Right-back

Team information
- Current team: General Caballero JLM
- Number: 4

Youth career
- Colón

Senior career*
Years	Team	Apps	(Gls)
2008–2012	Colón	62	(0)
2012–2013	Quilmes	14	(0)
2013–2014	Racing Club	5	(0)
2014–2019	Aldosivi	91	(0)
2019–2021	Central Córdoba SdE	27	(1)
2021–2022	Huracán	37	(0)
2023	San Martín (T)	22	(0)
2024	Gutiérrez SC	11	(0)
2024–	General Caballero JLM	8	(0)

International career^{‡}
2011	Argentina	2	(0)
- * Club domestic league appearances and goals as of 23 September 2024 ‡ National team caps and goals as of 25 May 2011

Ismael Alberto Quílez (born 2 October 1988) is an Argentine football defender who plays for General Caballero JLM of the Paraguayan Primera División.

== Career ==
Quílez came through the Colón youth development system to make his competitive debut for the first team in a 0–1 defeat to Estudiantes on 7 December 2008 aged 20. In the Apertura 2009 Quílez became a regular player for the team, starting the majority of the games.
