= Hugo Vera =

Paraguayan footballer (born 1991)

Personal information
- Full name: Hugo Ismael Vera Oviedo
- Date of birth: 1 January 1991 (age 35)
- Place of birth: Asunción, Paraguay
- Height: 1.87 m (6 ft 2 in)
- Position: Right-back

Team information
- Current team: Gimnasia Jujuy

Youth career
- Olimpia

Senior career*
Years	Team	Apps	(Gls)
2010–2011	Olimpia	4	(0)
2011–2012	Central Córdoba SdE	25	(1)
2012–2013	Ferro Carril Oeste	11	(1)
2013–2021	Central Córdoba SdE	142	(8)
2021	Instituto	12	(1)
2022–	Gimnasia Jujuy	10	(0)
- * Club domestic league appearances and goals as of 18:23, 21 July 2022 (UTC)

Hugo Ismael Vera Oviedo (born 1 January 1991) is a Paraguayan professional footballer who plays as a right-back for Gimnasia Jujuy.

== Career ==
Vera began his career in his homeland with Olimpia, featuring four times in the Paraguayan Primera División in 2010. In July 2011, Vera completed a move to Argentine club Central Córdoba. One goal in twenty-five matches followed in Torneo Argentino A, prior to the defender signing for Primera B Nacional's Ferro Carril Oeste on 27 July 2012. He made his debut on 13 August against Libertad, which was one of eleven appearances in 2012–13. August 2013 saw Vera agree to rejoin Central Córdoba. A total of one hundred and twelve appearances followed in six seasons, as they won promotion from Torneo Federal A twice.

== Career statistics ==
As of 5 December 2018.

Club statistics
Club	Season	League			Cup (Note: Includes the Copa Argentina)		League Cup		Continental (Note: Includes the Copa Sudamericana)		Other		Total	
Club	Season	Division	Apps	Goals	Apps	Goals	Apps	Goals	Apps	Goals	Apps	Goals	Apps	Goals
Olimpia	2010	Primera División	4	0	—		—		0	0	0	0	4	0
Olimpia	2011	Primera División	0	0	—		—		0	0	0	0	0	0
Olimpia	Total		4	0	—		—		0	0	0	0	4	0
Central Córdoba	2011–12	Torneo Argentino A	25	1	0	0	—		—		0	0	25	1
Ferro Carril Oeste	2012–13	Primera B Nacional	11	1	0	0	—		—		0	0	11	1
Central Córdoba	2013–14	Torneo Argentino A	21	1	3	0	—		—		1 (Note: One appearance in the 2013–14 Torneo Argentino A play-offs)	0	25	1
Central Córdoba	2014	Torneo Federal A	4	0	0	0	—		—		1 (Note: One appearance in the 2014 Torneo Federal A play-offs)	0	5	0
Central Córdoba	2015	Primera B Nacional	21	0	0	0	—		—		0	0	21	0
Central Córdoba	2016	Primera B Nacional	17	2	0	0	—		—		0	0	17	2
Central Córdoba	2016–17	Primera B Nacional	23	1	1	0	—		—		0	0	24	1
Central Córdoba	2017–18	Torneo Federal A	18	1	2	0	—		—		0	0	20	1
Central Córdoba	2018–19	Primera B Nacional	10	1	2	0	—		—		0	0	12	1
Central Córdoba	Total		114	6	8	0	—		—		2	0	124	6
Career total			154	8	8	0	—		0	0	2	0	164	8

== Honours ==
Central Córdoba

- Torneo Federal A: 2017–18
