= Nicolás Miracco =

Argentine footballer

Personal information
- Full name: Nicolás Juan Gabriel Miracco
- Date of birth: 12 April 1991 (age 35)
- Place of birth: Mar del Plata, Argentina
- Height: 1.82 m (6 ft 0 in)
- Positions: Forward; winger

Team information
- Current team: Nueva Chicago

Youth career
- Aldosivi

Senior career*
Years	Team	Apps	(Gls)
2012–2017	Aldosivi	63	(5)
2016	→ Santamarina (loan)	15	(3)
2017–2019	Sarmiento	44	(17)
2019–2020	Central Córdoba SdE	10	(1)
2020–2021	Arsenal de Sarandí	11	(0)
2022–	Nueva Chicago	5	(1)
- * Club domestic league appearances and goals as of 15:26, 20 March 2022 (UTC)

Nicolás Juan Gabriel Miracco (born 12 April 1991) is an Argentine professional footballer who plays as a forward or winger for Nueva Chicago.

== Career ==
Miracco made his debut for his first club, Aldosivi, on 16 June 2012 in a 0–0 home draw versus Defensa y Justicia in the 2011–12 Primera B Nacional. Six days later, on 22 June, he made his second appearance in a 3–3 draw against Gimnasia y Esgrima. Twenty-two league appearances followed in the next two seasons for Miracco. In 2014, Aldosivi won promotion into the Argentine Primera División and Miracco made fifteen appearances whilst scoring his first four career goals; most notably scoring two versus Instituto. He scored once in thirteen games in his first season in Argentina's top-flight (2015) before departing on loan in 2016.

In 2016, Miracco joined Primera B Nacional side Santamarina. He participated in fifteen matches and scored three goals before returning to Aldosivi. In September 2017, Miracco signed for Sarmiento of Primera B Nacional. He made his 100th career appearance on 20 May 2018, during a victory away to Brown; which he also scored in.

In June 2019, Miracco signed a one-year deal with newly promoted Argentine Primera División side Central Córdoba de Santiago del Estero. On 24 August 2020, Miracco moved to Arsenal de Sarandí. After a year and a half at Arsenal, Miracco moved to Nueva Chicago in January 2022.

== Career statistics ==
As of 21 May 2018.

Club statistics
Club	Season	League			Cup (Note: Includes the Copa Argentina)		League Cup		Continental (Note: Includes the Copa Libertadores and Copa Sudamericana)		Other		Total	
Club	Season	Division	Apps	Goals	Apps	Goals	Apps	Goals	Apps	Goals	Apps	Goals	Apps	Goals
Aldosivi	2011–12	Primera B Nacional	2	0	0	0	—		—		0	0	2	0
Aldosivi	2012–13	Primera B Nacional	13	0	0	0	—		—		0	0	13	0
Aldosivi	2013–14	Primera B Nacional	9	0	2	0	—		—		0	0	11	0
Aldosivi	2014	Primera B Nacional	15	4	0	0	—		—		0	0	15	4
Aldosivi	2015	Primera División	13	1	0	0	—		—		0	0	13	1
Aldosivi	2016	Primera División	0	0	0	0	—		—		0	0	0	0
Aldosivi	2016–17	Primera División	11	0	0	0	—		—		0	0	11	0
Aldosivi	Total		63	5	2	0	—		—		0	0	65	5
Santamarina (loan)	2016	Primera B Nacional	15	3	0	0	—		—		0	0	15	3
Sarmiento	2017–18	Primera B Nacional	17	5	1	0	—		—		2 (Note: Two appearances in 2017–18 Primera B Nacional play-offs)	1 (Note: One goal in 2017–18 Primera B Nacional play-offs)	20	6
Career total			95	13	3	0	—		—		2	1	100	14
