= Marcos Sánchez (footballer, born 1990) =

Argentine footballer (born 1990)

Personal information
- Full name: Marcos Fabián Sánchez
- Date of birth: 14 March 1990 (age 36)
- Place of birth: Machagai, Argentina
- Height: 1.82 m (5 ft 11 1/2 in)
- Position: Left-back

Team information
- Current team: Mitre

Youth career
- Ferro Carril Oeste

Senior career*
| Years | Team | Apps | (Gls) |
| 2009–2014 | Ferro Carril Oeste | 90 | (0) |
| 2014–2017 | Gimnasia Jujuy | 68 | (2) |
| 2017–2020 | Central Córdoba SdE | 59 | (1) |
| 2020–2021 | Güemes | 0 | (0) |
| 2021 | Villa Dálmine | 9 | (1) |
| 2021–2022 | All Boys | 42 | (0) |
| 2023– | Mitre | 84 | (3) |
- * Club domestic league appearances and goals as of 17:58, 14 August 2025 (UTC)

Marcos Fabián Sánchez (born 14 March 1990) is an Argentine professional footballer who plays as a left-back for Mitre.

== Career ==
Sánchez started his career with Ferro Carril Oeste. After four appearances in Primera B Nacional in 2009–10, Sánchez went on to make a subsequent eighty-seven appearances for them. On 1 July 2014, Gimnasia y Esgrima completed the signing of Sánchez. He made his debut on 10 August against Guaraní Antonio Franco, prior to scoring his first goal versus Instituto in November. Sánchez left after three years with Gimnasia y Esgrima, leaving to join fellow second tier side Central Córdoba. They were relegated in his first season, before winning promotion back to Primera B Nacional in his second; as Sánchez featured thirty-four times.

== Career statistics ==
As of 5 December 2018.

Club statistics
| Club | Season | League | | | Cup (Note: Includes the Copa Argentina) | | League Cup | | Continental | | Other | | Total | |
| Club | Season | Division | Apps | Goals | Apps | Goals | Apps | Goals | Apps | Goals | Apps | Goals | Apps | Goals |
|---|---|---|---|---|---|---|---|---|---|---|---|---|---|---|
| Ferro Carril Oeste | 2009–10 | Primera B Nacional | 4 | 0 | 0 | 0 | — | | — | | 0 | 0 | 4 | 0 |
| Ferro Carril Oeste | 2010–11 | Primera B Nacional | 10 | 0 | 0 | 0 | — | | — | | 0 | 0 | 10 | 0 |
| Ferro Carril Oeste | 2011–12 | Primera B Nacional | 25 | 0 | 1 | 0 | — | | — | | 0 | 0 | 26 | 0 |
| Ferro Carril Oeste | 2012–13 | Primera B Nacional | 13 | 0 | 0 | 0 | — | | — | | 0 | 0 | 13 | 0 |
| Ferro Carril Oeste | 2013–14 | Primera B Nacional | 38 | 0 | 0 | 0 | — | | — | | 0 | 0 | 38 | 0 |
| Ferro Carril Oeste | Total | | 90 | 0 | 1 | 0 | — | | — | | 0 | 0 | 91 | 0 |
| Gimnasia y Esgrima | 2014 | Primera B Nacional | 20 | 1 | 0 | 0 | — | | — | | 0 | 0 | 20 | 1 |
| Gimnasia y Esgrima | 2015 | Primera B Nacional | 30 | 0 | 0 | 0 | — | | — | | 0 | 0 | 30 | 0 |
| Gimnasia y Esgrima | 2016 | Primera B Nacional | 8 | 0 | 0 | 0 | — | | — | | 0 | 0 | 8 | 0 |
| Gimnasia y Esgrima | 2016–17 | Primera B Nacional | 10 | 1 | 0 | 0 | — | | — | | 0 | 0 | 10 | 1 |
| Gimnasia y Esgrima | Total | | 68 | 2 | 0 | 0 | — | | — | | 0 | 0 | 68 | 2 |
| Central Córdoba | 2016–17 | Primera B Nacional | 8 | 0 | 0 | 0 | — | | — | | 0 | 0 | 8 | 0 |
| Central Córdoba | 2017–18 | Torneo Federal A | 25 | 0 | 1 | 0 | — | | — | | 0 | 0 | 26 | 0 |
| Central Córdoba | 2018–19 | Primera B Nacional | 8 | 0 | 1 | 0 | — | | — | | 0 | 0 | 9 | 0 |
| Central Córdoba | Total | | 41 | 0 | 2 | 0 | — | | — | | 0 | 0 | 43 | 0 |
| Career total | | | 199 | 2 | 3 | 0 | — | | — | | 0 | 0 | 202 | 2 |

== Honours ==
Central Córdoba

- Torneo Federal A: 2017–18
