= Gustavo Coleoni =

Argentine football manager

Personal information
- Full name: Gustavo Iván Coleoni
- Date of birth: 16 August 1968 (age 58)
- Place of birth: Córdoba, Argentina
- Height: 1.61 m (5 ft 3 in)
- Position: Right midfielder

Team information
- Current team: San Miguel (manager)

Youth career
- 1976–1985: Talleres

Senior career*
Years	Team	Apps	(Gls)
1986	Boca de Bariloche		
1987	Bella Vista de Córdoba		
1989	Las Palmas		
1990	San Agustín		
1991	Coquimbo Unido		
- Magallanes
- Central Río Segundo
- Bella Vista de Córdoba
- Matienzo
- Independiente Dolores
- Atlético Rio Tercero
- Belgrano La Para

Managerial career
- 1998–2002: Talleres (youth)
- 2004–2005: Racing de Córdoba (youth)
- 2006: Racing de Córdoba
- 2007: Gimnasia de Mendoza
- 2007: Juventud Antoniana
- 2008–2010: Juventud Antoniana
- 2010: Central Norte
- 2011: Talleres
- 2011–2012: Racing de Córdoba
- 2012–2013: Santamarina
- 2013–2014: Central Norte
- 2014: Guillermo Brown
- 2014: Sportivo Patria
- 2015–2016: Santamarina
- 2016: Ferro Carril Oeste
- 2017–2020: Central Córdoba
- 2021: Central Córdoba
- 2022–2024: San Miguel
- 2025–: San Miguel
- * Club domestic league appearances and goals

Gustavo Iván Coleoni (born 16 August 1968) is an Argentine football manager and former player who played as a midfielder. He is the current manager of San Miguel.

Coleoni is nicknamed Sapito (Little Frog) due to his small height and his jumps to avoid his opponents.

== Playing career ==
Born in Córdoba, Coleoni was a Talleres youth graduate. During his youth, due to his low height, the club paid a growth hormone treatment similar as to Lionel Messi's, but it never fully worked.

After only playing two friendlies in the first team, Coleoni resumed his career with Peru's San Agustín and Chile's Magallanes, aside from lower league sides in his native region.

== Managerial career ==
After retiring Coleoni took up coaching in 1997, being initially a coordinator of his first club Talleres' youth sides and later being their manager. In 2003 he moved to Racing de Córdoba; initially a general coordinator, he was manager of the club's youth categories in 2004, and subsequently became their first team manager in 2006.

On 17 December 2006, Coleoni was named manager of Gimnasia y Esgrima de Mendoza, but was subsequently replaced by Ricardo Dillon. He was subsequently in charge of Juventud Antoniana also in the 2007 season, but resigned.

On 3 June 2008, Coleoni returned to Juventud Antoniana. He narrowly missed out promotion to Primera B Nacional in his two seasons in charge, and later moved to Juventud Unida Universitario in July 2010 as a general coordinator.

In September 2010, Coleoni was named at the helm of Central Norte. The following 21 February, he was named in charge of former side Talleres, with the club in the Torneo Argentino A.

In June 2011, Coleoni returned to Racing de Córdoba as first team manager. Roughly one year later, he was appointed at the helm of Santamarina, before returning to Central Norte in 2013.

In January 2015, after short periods in charge of Guillermo Brown and Sportivo Patria, Coleoni returned to Santamarina. He left the club in June 2016 to take over Ferro Carril Oeste in the second division.

Coleoni was sacked by Ferro on 15 December 2016, and took over Central Córdoba de Santiago del Estero the following January. Despite suffering relegation in his first season, the club won the 2017–18 Torneo Federal A and subsequently achieved promotion to the Primera División and reached the finals of the Copa Argentina in 2018–19.

On 17 March 2020, Coleoni resigned from the Ferroviarios. On 30 December, the club announced his return, effective as after the ending of the 2020 Copa de la Liga Profesional.
