= 2019–20 Club Agropecuario Argentino season =

Association football season

Agropecuario
2019–20 season
- President: Bernardo Grobocopatel
- Manager: Felipe De la Riva
- Stadium: Estadio Ofelia Rosenzuaig
- Top goalscorer: League: Mariano Miño (2); All: Mariano Miño (2)

The 2019–20 season is Agropecuario's third consecutive season in the second division of Argentine football, Primera B Nacional.

The season generally covers the period from 1 July 2019 to 30 June 2020.

== Review ==
=== Pre-season ===
Emanuel Molina became their first signing of 2019–20, as the central midfielder penned terms on 2 May 2019 from Villa Dálmine. Later that month, goalkeeper Germán Salort switched Agropecuario for Instituto. Fellow 'keeper Martín Perafán (Mitre) took his place on 6 June, which preceded a double incoming on 8 June as Matías Defederico and Nicolás Dematei joined from Apollon Smyrnis and Independiente Rivadavia respectively. Cristian Barinaga said his goodbyes on 10 June as he signed for San Martín (SJ), while forwards Mauro Albertengo (Atlético de Rafaela) and Martín Comachi (Villa Dálmine) put pen to paper on deals with the club across the next three days. Gonzalo Goñi and Nicolás Talpone, players who were on loan during the previous season, officially left on 30 June.

Agropecuario completed a third transaction from Villa Dálmine on 5 July, as attacking midfielder Mariano Miño made the move to Carlos Casares. They opened their pre-season campaign with a 6–0 victory over Deportivo Argentino, with Alejandro Gagliardi notching a brace. Their second friendly was played on 12 July versus Quilmes, with a goalless draw being followed a two-goal win thanks to Franco Colela. Fernando Juárez was loaned from Talleres of the Primera División on 23 July. Sarmiento visited Agropecuario on 24 July, drawing and losing across two encounters at the Estadio Ofelia Rosenzuaig in Buenos Aires. 24/25 July saw two departures sealed as Reinaldo Alderete and Gonzalo Klusener headed off to Atlético de Rafaela and Independiente Rivadavia respectively.

They and Sarmiento scheduled rematches on 27 July, which again ended in a tie and a win - though this time in favour of Agropecuario. They travelled to Deportivo Morón on 2 August for their fifth day of friendlies, beating their league rivals 0–2 prior to losing 2–1. Agropecuario defeated Compañía General in a friendly on 8 August.

=== August ===
Goals from Exequiel Narese and Mariano Miño gave Agropecuario victory on matchday one in Primera B Nacional, as they beat newly-promoted Alvarado away from home on 18 August. Agropecuario followed that with a further three points against Belgrano on 25 August, as Mariano Miño netted again.

=== September ===
Agropecuario lost their third league fixture to Estudiantes (BA) on 2 September.

== Squad ==
Squad No.	Nationality	Name	Position(s)	Date of birth (age)	Signed from
Goalkeepers
	Argentina	Mariano Barufaldi	GK	4 September 1992 (age 34)	Academy
	Argentina	Martín Perafán	GK	31 January 1987 (age 39)	Mitre
	Argentina	Darío Sand	GK	4 February 1988 (age 38)	Gimnasia y Tiro
Defenders
	Argentina	Nicolás Dematei	LB	19 November 1987 (age 38)	Independiente Rivadavia
	Argentina	Gonzalo Erazún	DF	30 October 1996 (age 30)	Academy
	Argentina	Mariano Fernández	RB	27 January 1988 (age 38)	Gimnasia y Esgrima
	Argentina	Agustín García Basso	LB	26 March 1992 (age 34)	Santamarina
	Argentina	Nahuel Gómez	RB	23 August 1996 (age 30)	Rosario Central
	Argentina	Teo Lamas	DF	19 February 2000 (age 26)	Academy
	Argentina	Ezequiel Parnisari	CB	1 June 1990 (age 36)	Aldosivi
	Argentina	Federico Rosso	CB	1 July 1987 (age 39)	Chacarita Juniors
	Argentina	Lucas Vesco	RB	28 January 1991 (age 35)	Rivadavia
Midfielders
	Argentina	Jonathan Blanco	CM	29 April 1987 (age 39)	Olimpo
	Argentina	Franco Colela	CM	5 January 1996 (age 30)	Banfield
	Argentina	Matías Defederico	AM	23 August 1989 (age 37)	Apollon Smyrnis
	Argentina	Fernando Juárez	CM	23 August 1998 (age 28)	Talleres
	Argentina	Alejandro Gagliardi	RM	6 August 1989 (age 37)	Santa Tecla
	Argentina	Tomás Gallo	MF	7 September 1999 (age 27)	Academy
	Argentina	Edgardo Maldonado	MF	11 September 1991 (age 35)	El Fortin
	Argentina	Mariano Miño	AM	28 March 1994 (age 32)	Villa Dálmine
	Argentina	Emanuel Molina	CM	4 March 1987 (age 39)	Villa Dálmine
	Argentina	Exequiel Narese	RM	8 March 1990 (age 36)	Juventud Unida
	Uruguay	Gonzalo Papa	AM	8 May 1989 (age 37)	Villa Dálmine
	Argentina	Lucas Seimandi	AM	26 July 1993 (age 33)	Sportivo Las Parejas
	Uruguay	Emiliano Tellechea	RM	5 July 1987 (age 39)	Olimpo
Forwards
	Argentina	Mauro Albertengo	FW	4 January 1990 (age 36)	Atlético de Rafaela
	Argentina	Alan Baselli	FW	17 July 1998 (age 28)	Academy
	Argentina	Brian Blando	CF	1 April 1995 (age 31)	Academy
	Argentina	Martín Comachi	FW	22 October 1991 (age 35)	Villa Dálmine
	Argentina	Gonzalo Urquijo	CF	28 October 1989 (age 37)	Atlético Carlos Casares
Out on loan					Loaned to
	Argentina	Enzo Díaz	CB	7 December 1995 (age 30)	Talleres

== Transfers ==
Domestic transfer windows:
3 July 2019 to 24 September 2019
20 January 2020 to 19 February 2020.

=== Transfers in ===
Date from	Position	Nationality	Name	From	Ref.
3 July 2019 (Note: Deal agreed on 2 May 2019)	CM	Argentina	Emanuel Molina	Villa Dálmine	
3 July 2019 (Note: Deal agreed on 6 June 2019)	GK	Argentina	Martín Perafán	Mitre	
3 July 2019 (Note: Deal agreed on 8 June 2019)	AM	Argentina	Matías Defederico	Apollon Smyrnis	
3 July 2019 (Note: Deal agreed on 8 June 2019)	LB	Argentina	Nicolás Dematei	Independiente Rivadavia	
3 July 2019 (Note: Deal agreed on 11 June 2019)	FW	Argentina	Mauro Albertengo	Atlético de Rafaela	
3 July 2019 (Note: Deal agreed on 13 June 2019)	FW	Argentina	Martín Comachi	Villa Dálmine	
5 July 2019	AM	Argentina	Mariano Miño	Villa Dálmine	

=== Transfers out ===
Date from	Position	Nationality	Name	To	Ref.
3 July 2019 (Note: Deal agreed on 22 May 2019)	GK	Argentina	Germán Salort	Instituto	
3 July 2019 (Note: Deal agreed on 10 June 2019)	CF	Argentina	Cristian Barinaga	San Martín	
24 July 2019	CM	Argentina	Reinaldo Alderete	Atlético de Rafaela	
25 July 2019	CF	Argentina	Gonzalo Klusener	Independiente Rivadavia	

=== Loans in ===
Start date	Position	Nationality	Name	From	End date	Ref.
23 July 2019	CM	Argentina	Fernando Juárez	Talleres	30 June 2020	

== Friendlies ==
=== Pre-season ===
A friendly with Deportivo Argentino was scheduled for 9 July 2019, while Quilmes and Sarmiento would also travel to Agropecuario on 12/24 July. Rematches with Sarmiento and games with Deportivo Morón and Compañía General were also scheduled.

Win Draw Loss

9 July 2019 Friendly	Agropecuario	6–0	Deportivo Argentino	Carlos Casares, Argentina
14:00 GMT-3	A. Gagliardi; M. Albertengo; M. Comachi; L. Vesco; F. Colela	Grupo La Provincia		Stadium: Estadio Ofelia Rosenzuaig

12 July 2019 Friendly	Agropecuario	0–0	Quilmes	Carlos Casares, Argentina
13:00 GMT-3		Perspectiva Sur; 60 min. match		Stadium: Estadio Ofelia Rosenzuaig

12 July 2019 Friendly	Agropecuario	2–0	Quilmes	Carlos Casares, Argentina
	F. Colela	Perspectiva Sur; 60 min. match		Stadium: Estadio Ofelia Rosenzuaig

24 July 2019 Friendly	Agropecuario	0–0	Sarmiento	Carlos Casares, Argentina
13:00 GMT-3		Mundo Ascenso; 35 min. match		Stadium: Estadio Ofelia Rosenzuaig

24 July 2019 Friendly	Agropecuario	1–2	Sarmiento	Carlos Casares, Argentina
	G. Urquijo	Mundo Ascenso; 35 min. match	B. Borasi; B. Liuzzi	Stadium: Estadio Ofelia Rosenzuaig

27 July 2019 Friendly	Sarmiento	0–0	Agropecuario	Junín, Argentina
		Infoeme		Stadium: Estadio Eva Perón

27 July 2019 Friendly	Sarmiento	0–2	Agropecuario	Junín, Argentina
		Infoeme	G. Urquijo; F. Colela	Stadium: Estadio Eva Perón

2 August 2019 Friendly	Deportivo Morón	0–2	Agropecuario	Morón, Argentina
		Grupo La Provincia	E. Narese; A. Gagliardi	Stadium: Estadio Nuevo Francisco Urbano

2 August 2019 Friendly	Deportivo Morón	2–1	Agropecuario	Morón, Argentina
	V. Perales; J. D'Angelo	Grupo La Provincia	F. Pérez	Stadium: Estadio Nuevo Francisco Urbano

8 August 2019 Friendly	Agropecuario	2–0	Compañía General	Argentina
	A. Gagliardi; E. Molina	Agropecuario

== Competitions ==
=== Primera B Nacional ===
==== League table ====
Pos	Team	Pld	W	D	L	GF	GA	GD	Pts
1	Atlanta	20	11	5	4	33	20	+13	38
2	Estudiantes (RC)	21	10	7	4	29	19	+10	37
3	Estudiantes (BA)	21	11	3	7	31	25	+6	36
4	Temperley	21	8	8	5	22	19	+3	32
5	Deportivo Morón	21	9	5	7	19	18	+1	32
6	Ferro Carril Oeste	21	9	4	8	20	20	0	31
7	Platense	21	9	3	9	22	25	−3	30
8	Agropecuario Argentino	21	8	5	8	23	19	+4	29
9	San Martín (SJ)	21	7	7	7	19	22	−3	28
10	Belgrano	21	5	12	4	26	25	+1	27
11	Alvarado	21	7	5	9	27	28	−1	26
12	Guillermo Brown	21	6	7	8	18	21	−3	25
13	Independiente Rivadavia	20	6	6	8	26	28	−2	24
14	Barracas Central	21	5	6	10	19	26	−7	21
15	Mitre (SdE)	21	3	8	10	11	19	−8	17
16	Nueva Chicago (Note: Nueva Chicago were deducted one point as punishment for crowd disturbances in their home match against Temperley.)	21	2	11	8	16	27	−11	16

Source: AFA
Rules for classification: 1) points; 2) play-off (only for deciding promotion or relegation); 3) goal difference; 4) goals scored; 5) head-to-head points; 6) head-to-head goal difference; 7) head-to-head goals scored.

==== Results summary ====
Overall								Home						Away					
Pld	W	D	L	GF	GA	GD	Pts	W	D	L	GF	GA	GD	W	D	L	GF	GA	GD
3	2	0	1	3	2	+1	6	1	0	0	1	0	+1	1	0	1	2	2	0

Last updated: 3 September 2019.
Source: Soccerway

==== Matches ====
The fixtures for the 2019–20 league season were announced on 1 August 2019, with a new format of split zones being introduced. Agropecuario were drawn in Zone A.

Win Draw Loss

18 August 2019 1	Alvarado	1–2	Agropecuario	Mar del Plata, Argentina
18:00 GMT-3	J. Zules Caicedo 90'	La Capital MdP; Soccerway	E. Narese 18'; M. Miño 19'	Stadium: Estadio José María Minella; Referee: Lucas Novelli (Argentina)

25 August 2019 2	Agropecuario	1–0	Belgrano	Carlos Casares, Argentina
14:00 GMT-3	M. Miño 50'	Olé; Soccerway		Stadium: Estadio Ofelia Rosenzuaig; Referee: Leandro Rey Hilfer (Argentina)

2 September 2019 3	Estudiantes (BA)	1–0	Agropecuario	Caseros, Argentina
19:30 GMT-3	F. González Metilli 7'	El Eco; Soccerway		Stadium: Estadio Ciudad de Caseros; Referee: Diego Ceballos (Argentina)

8 September 2019 4	Agropecuario	–	San Martín	Carlos Casares, Argentina
16:00 GMT-3				Stadium: Estadio Ofelia Rosenzuaig

== Squad statistics ==
=== Appearances and goals ===
No.	Pos.	Nationality	Name	League		Cup		League Cup		Continental		Other		Total		Discipline		Ref
No.	Pos.	Nationality	Name	Apps	Goals	Apps	Goals	Apps	Goals	Apps	Goals	Apps	Goals	Apps	Goals	Yellow card	Red card	Ref
–	GK	Argentina	Mariano Barufaldi	0	0	—		—		—		0	0	0	0	0	0	
–	GK	Argentina	Martín Perafán	3	0	—		—		—		0	0	3	0	0	0	
–	GK	Argentina	Darío Sand	0	0	—		—		—		0	0	0	0	0	0	
–	LB	Argentina	Nicolás Dematei	3	0	—		—		—		0	0	3	0	2	0	
–	DF	Argentina	Gonzalo Erazún	0	0	—		—		—		0	0	0	0	0	0	
–	RB	Argentina	Mariano Fernández	0	0	—		—		—		0	0	0	0	0	0	
–	LB	Argentina	Agustín García Basso	0	0	—		—		—		0	0	0	0	0	0	
–	CB	Argentina	Enzo Díaz	0	0	—		—		—		0	0	0	0	0	0	
–	RB	Argentina	Nahuel Gómez	0(1)	0	—		—		—		0	0	0(1)	0	0	0	
–	DF	Argentina	Teo Lamas	0	0	—		—		—		0	0	0	0	0	0	
–	CB	Argentina	Ezequiel Parnisari	3	0	—		—		—		0	0	3	0	0	0	
–	CB	Argentina	Federico Rosso	2	0	—		—		—		0	0	2	0	1	0	
–	RB	Argentina	Lucas Vesco	1	0	—		—		—		0	0	1	0	0	0	
–	CM	Argentina	Jonathan Blanco	3	0	—		—		—		0	0	3	0	2	0	
–	CM	Argentina	Franco Colela	0	0	—		—		—		0	0	0	0	0	0	
–	AM	Argentina	Matías Defederico	3	0	—		—		—		0	0	3	0	1	0	
–	CM	Argentina	Fernando Juárez	0(1)	0	—		—		—		0	0	0(1)	0	0	0	
–	RM	Argentina	Alejandro Gagliardi	3	0	—		—		—		0	0	3	0	0	0	
–	MF	Argentina	Tomás Gallo	0	0	—		—		—		0	0	0	0	0	0	
–	MF	Argentina	Edgardo Maldonado	0(2)	0	—		—		—		0	0	0(2)	0	0	0	
–	AM	Argentina	Mariano Miño	3	2	—		—		—		0	0	3	2	1	0	
–	CM	Argentina	Emanuel Molina	3	0	—		—		—		0	0	3	0	0	0	
–	RM	Argentina	Exequiel Narese	3	1	—		—		—		0	0	3	1	0	0	
–	AM	Uruguay	Gonzalo Papa	0(1)	0	—		—		—		0	0	0(1)	0	0	0	
–	AM	Argentina	Lucas Seimandi	0	0	—		—		—		0	0	0	0	0	0	
–	RM	Uruguay	Emiliano Tellechea	3	0	—		—		—		0	0	3	0	1	0	
–	FW	Argentina	Mauro Albertengo	0(2)	0	—		—		—		0	0	0(2)	0	0	0	
–	FW	Argentina	Alan Baselli	0	0	—		—		—		0	0	0	0	0	0	
–	CF	Argentina	Brian Blando	0(1)	0	—		—		—		0	0	0(1)	0	0	0	
–	FW	Argentina	Martín Comachi	0(1)	0	—		—		—		0	0	0(1)	0	0	0	
–	CF	Argentina	Gonzalo Urquijo	0	0	—		—		—		0	0	0	0	0	0	
Own goals				—	0	—		—		—		—	0	—	0	—	—	—

Statistics accurate as of 3 September 2019.

=== Goalscorers ===
Rank	Pos	No.	Nat	Name	League	Cup	League Cup	Continental	Other	Total	Ref
1	AM	–	Argentina	Mariano Miño	2	0	—	—	0	2	
2	RM	–	Argentina	Exequiel Narese	1	0	—	—	0	1	
Own goals					0	0	—	—	0	0	
Totals					3	0	—	—	0	3	—
