= Mariano Fernández (footballer, born 1988) =

Argentine footballer

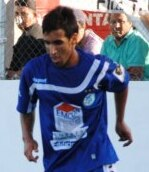
- Fernández playing for Villa San Carlos

Personal information
- Full name: Mariano Fernández Gnazzo
- Date of birth: 27 January 1988 (age 38)
- Place of birth: La Plata, Argentina
- Position: Right back

Senior career*
Years	Team	Apps	(Gls)
2010	Rivadavia	12	(0)
2011–2012	Villa San Carlos	51	(1)
2012–2014	Defensa y Justicia	6	(0)
2014–2015	Villa San Carlos	53	(3)
2016	Guaraní Antonio Franco	9	(0)
2016–2017	Agropecuario	30	(0)
2017–2018	Gimnasia y Esgrima	2	(0)
2018–2019	Agropecuario	2	(0)
- * Club domestic league appearances and goals as of 11:40, 3 November 2018 (UTC)

Mariano Fernández Gnazzo (born 27 January 1988) is an Argentine professional footballer who plays as a right back.

== Career ==
Fernández started his career with Rivadavia, appearing twelve times for the club during 2010. 2011 saw the defender sign for Primera B Metropolitana side Villa San Carlos, remaining until the conclusion of the 2011–12 campaign whilst scoring once, versus Tristán Suárez on 31 January 2012, in fifty-one fixtures. On 30 June 2012, Fernández joined Defensa y Justicia of Primera B Nacional. Seven appearances followed over two seasons with them, prior to Fernández rejoining Villa San Carlos in July 2014. He scored goals in games against UAI Urquiza and Deportivo Armenio over fifty-three matches back with Villa San Carlos.

2016 saw Fernández sign for Guaraní Antonio Franco, which preceded a move to Agropecuario. He made thirty appearances as the club won the 2016–17 Torneo Federal A title. They were promoted to Primera B Nacional, with Fernández subsequently departing to join fellow second tier outfit Gimnasia y Esgrima on 10 August 2017. However, a year later Fernández completed a return to Agropecuario.

== Career statistics ==
As of 3 November 2018.

Club statistics
Club	Season	League			Cup (Note: Includes the Copa Argentina)		League Cup		Continental		Other		Total	
Club	Season	Division	Apps	Goals	Apps	Goals	Apps	Goals	Apps	Goals	Apps	Goals	Apps	Goals
Rivadavia	2010–11	Torneo Argentino A	12	0	0	0	—		—		0	0	12	0
Defensa y Justicia	2012–13	Primera B Nacional	3	0	0	0	—		—		0	0	3	0
Defensa y Justicia	2013–14	Primera B Nacional	3	0	1	0	—		—		0	0	4	0
Defensa y Justicia	Total		6	0	1	0	—		—		0	0	7	0
Villa San Carlos	2014	Primera B Metropolitana	18	2	0	0	—		—		0	0	18	2
Villa San Carlos	2015	Primera B Metropolitana	35	1	1	0	—		—		0	0	36	1
Villa San Carlos	Total		53	3	1	0	—		—		0	0	54	3
Guaraní Antonio Franco	2016	Torneo Federal A	9	0	0	0	—		—		2 (Note: Two appearances in the 2016 Torneo Federal A play-offs)	0	11	0
Agropecuario	2016–17	Torneo Federal A	30	0	0	0	—		—		0	0	30	0
Gimnasia y Esgrima	2017–18	Primera B Nacional	2	0	0	0	—		—		0	0	2	0
Agropecuario	2018–19	Primera B Nacional	2	0	0	0	—		—		0	0	2	0
Career total			114	3	2	0	—		—		2	0	118	3

== Honours ==
Agropecuario

- Torneo Federal A: 2016–17
