= Albertengo =

Albertengo is an Italian surname. Notable people with the surname include:

- Gino Albertengo (born 2003), Argentine footballer
- Lucas Albertengo (born 1991), Argentine footballer
- Mauro Albertengo (born 1990), Argentine footballer
