= Vesco =

Vesco is a surname and can refer to:

- Adua Del Vesco (b.ca.1994), Italian actor
- Don Vesco (1939–2002), American businessperson and motorcycle racer
- Giovanna Dal Vesco (b.1929), Italian botanist with the standard author abbreviation Dal Vesco
- Giselle Vesco (b.1925), German actress
- Jean Nicolas Eugène Vesco (1816-1880), French surgeon
- Jean-Paul Vesco (b.1962), French Dominican bishop
- Lucas Vesco (b.1991), Argentine professional footballer
- Nicolas Martin Vesco (1789-1883), French military officer
- Robert Vesco (1935–2007), American criminal financier
- Víctor Vesco (1923-2009), Argentine sports administrator

== See also ==
- SMS S134, also known as Vesco, Imperial German Navy ship
- Vesco Tennis Courts, a privately held firm started by the family of Dorothy Vest
