= Gonzalo Urquijo =

Argentine footballer

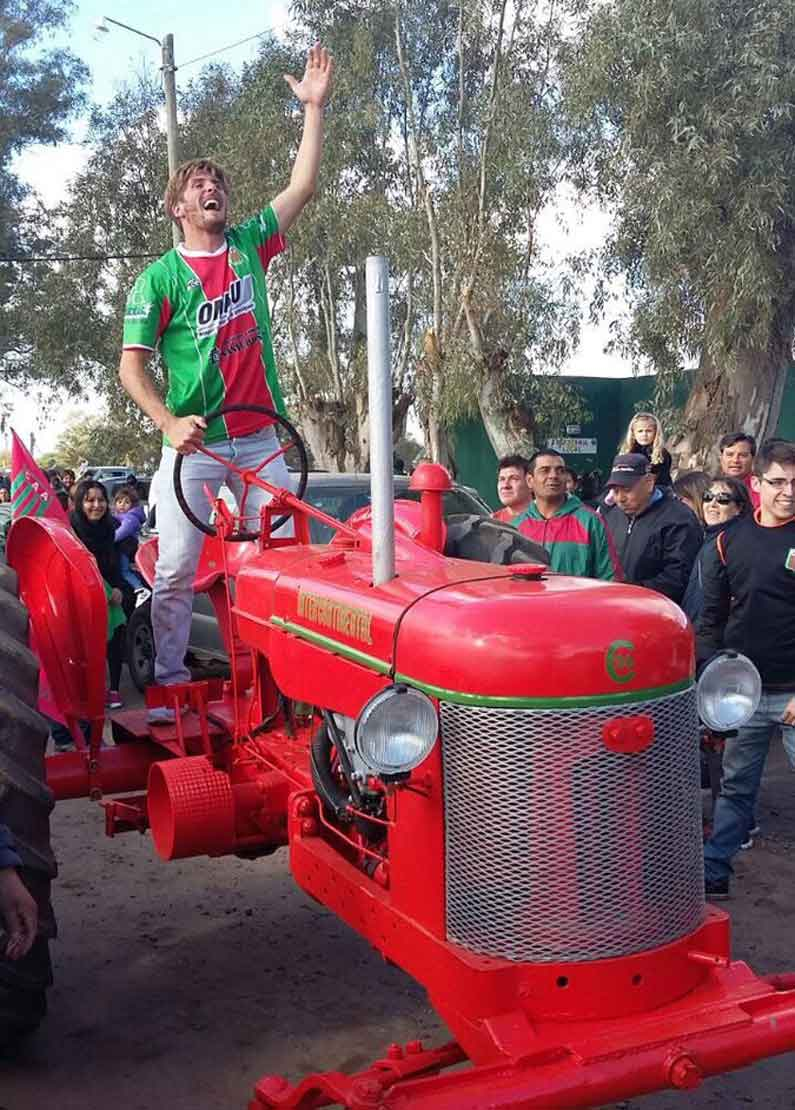
- Urquijo in 2017

Personal information
- Full name: Gonzalo Adrián Urquijo
- Date of birth: 28 October 1989 (age 37)
- Place of birth: Bellocq, Argentina
- Height: 1.83 m (6 ft 0 in)
- Position: Centre-forward

Team information
- Current team: Carlos Casares

Youth career
- Carlos Casares

Senior career*
Years	Team	Apps	(Gls)
2006-2009	Carlos Casares		
2010	Independiente de Chivilcoy		
2010-2011	Carlos Casares		
2012–2021	Agropecuario	170	(45)
2020	→ Guillermo Brown (loan)	5	(2)
2022	Bisceglie	9	(2)
2022	Guillermo Brown	9	(2)
2023–2024	Ciudad de Bolívar	15	(4)
2025–	Carlos Casares		
- * Club domestic league appearances and goals as of 13:54, 8 January 2026 (UTC)

Gonzalo Adrián Urquijo (born 28 October 1989) is an Argentine professional footballer who plays as a centre-forward for Carlos Casares in the Liga Casarense de Fútbol of Argentina.

== Career ==
Urquijo began in the youth ranks of Atlético Carlos Casares, prior to featuring for the club at senior level. He remained with Atlético Carlos Casares, either side of a spell with Independiente, until 2012 when the forward agreed to join Agropecuario in Torneo Argentino B. Twenty-three goals across eighty-five matches followed in four years, with Agropecuario subsequently winning consecutive promotions up to Primera B Nacional. In his second professional appearance, on 7 October 2017, Urquijo scored and was sent off as they lost 3–1 to Brown; in a season in which he scored five goals in twenty-three games.

In January 2020, Urquijo was loaned to fellow second tier team Guillermo Brown. He scored in his first and second match for the club, netting at home against Deportivo Morón and away versus Temperley.

In January 2022, Urquijo signed for Italian Serie D side Bisceglie. He played 9 games for the Italian side, before returning to his homeland and signed with his former club, Guillermo Brown, in June 2022.

In 2025, after 14 years, he returns to Atlético de Carlos Casares, to play in the Liga Casarense de fútbol, where he arrives from Ciudad Bólivar.

== Career statistics ==
As of 1 September 2020.

Club statistics
Club	Season	League			Cup		League Cup		Continental		Other		Total	
Club	Season	Division	Apps	Goals	Apps	Goals	Apps	Goals	Apps	Goals	Apps	Goals	Apps	Goals
Agropecuario	2016–17	Torneo Federal A	26	9	0	0	—		—		0	0	26	9
Agropecuario	2017–18	Primera B Nacional	20	4	0	0	—		—		3 (Note: Appearance(s) in the Primera B Nacional play-offs)	1	23	5
Agropecuario	2018–19	Primera B Nacional	19	3	2	1	—		—		0	0	21	4
Agropecuario	2019–20	Primera B Nacional	2	0	0	0	—		—		0	0	2	0
Agropecuario	Total		67	16	2	1	—		—		3	1	72	18
Guillermo Brown (loan)	2019–20	Primera B Nacional	5	2	0	0	—		—		0	0	5	2
Career total			72	18	2	1	—		—		3	1	77	20

== Honours ==
Agropecuario

- Torneo Federal A: 2016–17
