= Edgardo Maldonado =

Argentine footballer (born 1991)

Personal information
- Full name: Edgardo Maldonado
- Date of birth: 11 September 1991 (age 35)
- Place of birth: Olavarría, Argentina
- Height: 1.70 m (5 ft 7 in)
- Position: Midfielder

Senior career*
Years	Team	Apps	(Gls)
2011	El Fortin		
2013–2014	Agropecuario	13	(0)
2014–2015	Ferro Carril Sud	36	(4)
2015–2016	El Fortin		
2016–2021	Agropecuario	35	(2)
- * Club domestic league appearances and goals as of 06:56, 20 August 2022 (UTC)

Edgardo Maldonado (born 11 September 1991) is an Argentine professional footballer who plays as a midfielder.

== Career ==
Maldonado featured for El Fortin in Torneo Argentino C in 2011, prior to spending the 2013–14 Torneo Argentino A season with Agropecuario; making thirteen appearances. Ferro Carril Sud signed Maldonado in 2014, with the midfielder scoring four goals in thirty-six games for the club over two seasons. After returning to El Fortin in 2015, Maldonado departed a year later to rejoin Agropecuario of Torneo Federal A. They won promotion to Primera B Nacional in 2016–17, with Maldonado making his professional debut against Boca Unidos in December 2017. Ten more appearances followed in that campaign.

== Career statistics ==
As of 5 November 2018.

Club statistics
Club	Season	League			Cup (Note: Includes the Copa Argentina)		League Cup		Continental		Other		Total	
Club	Season	Division	Apps	Goals	Apps	Goals	Apps	Goals	Apps	Goals	Apps	Goals	Apps	Goals
Agropecuario	2013–14	Torneo Argentino B	13	0	0	0	—		—		0	0	13	0
Agropecuario	2016–17	Torneo Federal A	2	0	0	0	—		—		0	0	2	0
Agropecuario	2017–18	Primera B Nacional	10	0	0	0	—		—		1 (Note: One appearance in the 2017–18 Primera B Nacional play-offs)	0	11	0
Agropecuario	2018–19	Primera B Nacional	0	0	0	0	—		—		0	0	0	0
Career total			25	0	0	0	—		—		1	0	26	0

== Honours ==
Agropecuario

- Torneo Federal A: 2016–17
