= Martín Comachi =

Argentine footballer

Personal information
- Full name: Martín Nicolás Comachi
- Date of birth: 22 October 1991 (age 35)
- Place of birth: Santa Fe, Argentina
- Height: 1.80 m (5 ft 11 in)
- Position: Centre-forward

Team information
- Current team: All Boys

Youth career
- 2007–2010: Colón

Senior career*
Years	Team	Apps	(Gls)
2010–2015	Colón	12	(0)
2014	→ San Jorge (loan)	5	(0)
2016	Deportivo Quito	7	(1)
2016–2017	Sportivo Las Parejas	21	(4)
2017–2018	Unión Sunchales	22	(3)
2018–2019	Villa Dálmine	19	(2)
2019–2020	Agropecuario	17	(9)
2020–2021	Danubio	13	(2)
2021–2022	Instituto	11	(0)
2022–	All Boys	8	(0)
- * Club domestic league appearances and goals as of 18:12, 6 June 2022 (UTC)

Martín Nicolás Comachi (born 22 October 1991) is an Argentine professional footballer who plays as a centre-forward for All Boys.

== Career ==
Comachi began his career with Colón. He was on the substitutes bench for Primera División fixtures with Vélez Sarsfield, Estudiantes and Independiente across three seasons from 2010–11 but never made it onto the field of play. Mario Sciacqua awarded Comachi his professional bow on 12 October 2013 against All Boys, with the forward featuring twelve times in 2013–14 as Colón suffered relegation. He spent the subsequent 2014 campaign on loan with San Jorge. Five appearances followed. In January 2016, Comachi joined Ecuadorian Serie B side Deportivo Quito. He scored once and appeared seven times in 2016.

Comachi spent the 2016–17 season in Torneo Federal A with Sportivo Las Parejas, where he netted six total goals, which preceded him playing for fellow third tier outfit Unión Sunchales in 2017–18. On 12 June 2018, Comachi was signed by Villa Dálmine of Primera B Nacional. His first appearance came in a 3–0 victory over Instituto on 25 August, before his opening goal arrived on 15 September versus Mitre. A further goal came against Atlético de Rafaela, in the midst of twenty-two total appearances. July 2019 saw Comachi join Agropecuario. He'd score nine goals in nine different games before the season's early curtailment.

On 9 October 2020, Comachi moved abroad for the second time in his career after signing for Uruguayan Primera División side Danubio. He netted his first goal on 19 December in a 4–1 home loss to Peñarol. In April 2021, his contract with Danubio was terminated.

In July 2021, Comachi joined Instituto Atlético Central Córdoba on a deal until the end of 2022. However, he left the club in February 2022 to join Primera Nacional club All Boys.

== Personal life ==
Comachi's brother, Lucas, is also a professional footballer; they were both produced by Colón's youth system. Their father, Marcelo, also played football at pro level.

== Career statistics ==
As of 23 December 2020.

Appearances and goals by club, season and competition
Club	Season	League			Cup		League Cup		Continental		Other		Total	
Club	Season	Division	Apps	Goals	Apps	Goals	Apps	Goals	Apps	Goals	Apps	Goals	Apps	Goals
Colón	2010–11	Argentine Primera División	0	0	0	0	—		—		0	0	0	0
Colón	2011–12	Argentine Primera División	0	0	0	0	—		—		0	0	0	0
Colón	2012–13	Argentine Primera División	0	0	0	0	—		—		0	0	0	0
Colón	2013–14	Argentine Primera División	12	0	0	0	—		—		0	0	12	0
Colón	2014	Primera B Nacional	0	0	0	0	—		—		0	0	0	0
Colón	2015	Argentine Primera División	0	0	0	0	—		—		0	0	0	0
Colón	Total		12	0	0	0	—		—		0	0	12	0
San Jorge (loan)	2014	Torneo Federal A	5	0	0	0	—		—		0	0	5	0
Deportivo Quito	2016	Serie B	7	1	0	0	—		—		0	0	7	1
Sportivo Las Parejas	2016–17	Torneo Federal A	21	4	2	1	—		—		2 (Note: Appearance(s) in the Torneo Federal A play-offs)	1	25	6
Unión Sunchales	2017–18	Torneo Federal A	22	3	4	0	—		—		2	0	28	3
Villa Dálmine	2018–19	Primera B Nacional	19	2	3	0	—		—		0	0	22	2
Agropecuario	2019–20	Primera B Nacional	17	9	0	0	—		—		0	0	17	9
Danubio	2020	Uruguayan Primera División	3	1	—		—		—		0	0	3	1
Career total			106	20	9	1	—		—		4	1	119	22
