= Cristian Barinaga =

Argentine footballer

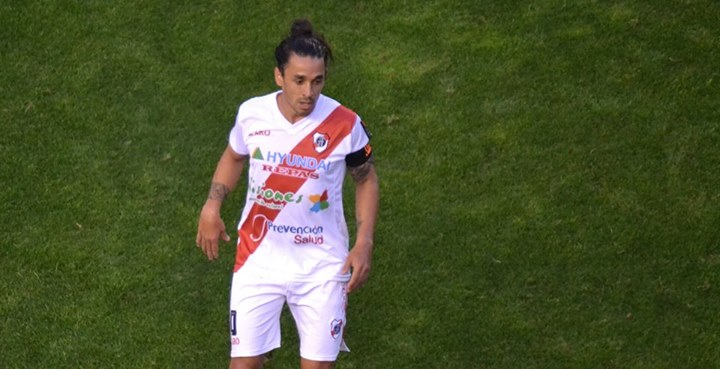

Personal information
- Full name: Cristian Andrés Omar Barinaga
- Date of birth: 5 February 1990 (age 36)
- Place of birth: La Plata, Argentina
- Height: 1.79 m (5 ft 10 1/2 in)
- Position: Forward

Team information
- Current team: Guaraní Antonio Franco

Youth career
- Quilmes

Senior career*
| Years | Team | Apps | (Gls) |
| 2005–2006 | Quilmes | 5 | (0) |
| 2008 | Guaraní Antonio Franco | | |
| 2009 | 2 de Mayo | 11 | (3) |
| 2009 | Colón | 4 | (0) |
| 2010 | Defensa y Justicia | 6 | (0) |
| 2011 | Aldosivi | 3 | (1) |
| 2011–2016 | Guaraní Antonio Franco | | |
| 2017–2019 | Agropecuario | 53 | (11) |
| 2019–2020 | San Martín SJ | 3 | (0) |
| 2020–2021 | Chaco For Ever | 12 | (3) |
| 2021– | Guaraní Antonio Franco | | |
- * Club domestic league appearances and goals as of 20:11, 11 August 2022 (UTC)

Cristian Andrés Omar Barinaga (born 5 February 1990) is an Argentine professional footballer who plays as a forward for Guaraní Antonio Franco.

== Career ==
Barinaga's career started in 2005, featuring for Quilmes in the Argentine Primera División during 2005–06; making five appearances. Barinaga signed for Guaraní Antonio Franco in 2008, prior to agreeing to join 2 de Mayo of the Paraguayan Primera División. He scored goals against 3 de Febrero, Libertad and Olimpia over eleven appearances. He returned to Argentina in 2009, which preceded spells with top-flight Colón and second tier Defensa y Justicia. Having featured an overall ten times, Barinaga moved on to Primera B Nacional's Aldosivi in 2011. He scored in his second match, netting in a 5–1 win over Ferro Carril Oeste.

On 30 September 2011, Barinaga completed a return to Guaraní Antonio Franco. He remained with the club until 2016, during which time he made over one hundred and eight appearances and scored forty-eight goals; as the club rose from Torneo Argentino B in 2011 to Primera B Nacional in 2014. Barinaga left Guaraní Antonio Franco midway through the 2016–17 Torneo Federal A, joining eventual champions Agropecuario. He scored three goals in nine games in 2016–17, with the forward subsequently scoring on his Primera B Nacional debut for Agropecuario during a win over Guillermo Brown on 30 September 2017.

== Career statistics ==
As of 6 November 2018.

Club statistics
| Club | Season | League | | | Cup (Note: Includes the Copa Argentina) | | League Cup | | Continental | | Other | | Total | |
| Club | Season | Division | Apps | Goals | Apps | Goals | Apps | Goals | Apps | Goals | Apps | Goals | Apps | Goals |
|---|---|---|---|---|---|---|---|---|---|---|---|---|---|---|
| Quilmes | 2005–06 | Argentine Primera División | 5 | 0 | 0 | 0 | — | | — | | 0 | 0 | 5 | 0 |
| 2 de Mayo | 2009 | Paraguayan Primera División | 11 | 3 | 0 | 0 | — | | — | | 0 | 0 | 11 | 3 |
| Colón | 2009–10 | Argentine Primera División | 4 | 0 | 0 | 0 | — | | — | | 0 | 0 | 4 | 0 |
| Defensa y Justicia | 2009–10 | Primera B Nacional | 6 | 0 | 0 | 0 | — | | — | | 0 | 0 | 6 | 0 |
| Aldosivi | 2010–11 | Primera B Nacional | 3 | 1 | 0 | 0 | — | | — | | 0 | 0 | 3 | 1 |
| Guaraní Antonio Franco | 2012–13 | Torneo Argentino A | 22 | 4 | 1 | 1 | — | | — | | 0 | 0 | 23 | 5 |
| Guaraní Antonio Franco | 2013–14 | Torneo Argentino A | 21 | 11 | 1 | 1 | — | | — | | 6 (Note: Six appearances in the 2013–14 Torneo Argentino A play-offs) | 4 (Note: Four goals in the 2013–14 Torneo Argentino A play-offs) | 28 | 12 |
| Guaraní Antonio Franco | 2014 | Primera B Nacional | 13 | 3 | 0 | 0 | — | | — | | 0 | 0 | 13 | 3 |
| Guaraní Antonio Franco | 2015 | Primera B Nacional | 20 | 6 | 0 | 0 | — | | — | | 0 | 0 | 20 | 6 |
| Guaraní Antonio Franco | 2016 | Torneo Federal A | 9 | 7 | 0 | 0 | — | | — | | 2 (Note: Two appearances in the 2016 Torneo Federal A play-offs) | 2 (Note: Two goals in the 2016 Torneo Federal A play-offs) | 11 | 9 |
| Guaraní Antonio Franco | 2016–17 | Torneo Federal A | 13 | 9 | 0 | 0 | — | | — | | 0 | 0 | 13 | 9 |
| Guaraní Antonio Franco | Total | | 98 | 40 | 2 | 2 | — | | — | | 8 | 6 | 108 | 48 |
| Agropecuario | 2016–17 | Torneo Federal A | 9 | 3 | 0 | 0 | — | | — | | 0 | 0 | 9 | 3 |
| Agropecuario | 2017–18 | Primera B Nacional | 21 | 6 | 0 | 0 | — | | — | | 3 (Note: Three appearances in the 2017–18 Primera B Nacional play-offs) | 0 | 24 | 6 |
| Agropecuario | 2018–19 | Primera B Nacional | 7 | 1 | 1 | 0 | — | | — | | 0 | 0 | 8 | 1 |
| Agropecuario | Total | | 37 | 10 | 1 | 0 | — | | — | | 3 | 0 | 41 | 10 |
| Career total | | | 164 | 54 | 3 | 2 | — | | — | | 11 | 6 | 178 | 62 |

== Honours ==
Agropecuario

- Torneo Federal A: 2016–17
