= Milton Ramos =

Argentine professional footballer

Personal information
- Full name: Milton Gonzalo Ramos
- Date of birth: 11 August 1994 (age 32)
- Place of birth: Adrogué, Argentina
- Height: 1.70 m (5 ft 7 in)
- Position: Left-back

Team information
- Current team: Agropecuario

Youth career
- Brown de Adrogué

Senior career*
Years	Team	Apps	(Gls)
2014–2015	Brown de Adrogué	0	(0)
2016–2018	San Miguel	71	(0)
2018–2022	Almirante Brown	67	(0)
2022–	Agropecuario	108	(0)
- * Club domestic league appearances and goals as of 17:33, 21 April 2026 (UTC)

Milton Gonzalo Ramos (born 11 August 1994) is an Argentine professional footballer who plays as a left-back for Agropecuario.

== Career ==
Ramos started his senior career with local club Brown. No matches arrived in league football for them, though he did make appearances against Villa Cubas and Defensa y Justicia in the Copa Argentina in April 2014. In January 2016, Ramos joined San Miguel in Primera C Metropolitana. He was selected forty-two times in his opening season, which ended with promotion to Primera B Metropolitana. Ramos departed on 30 June 2018 to sign for Almirante Brown. He made his debut against Estudiantes in August but didn't feature again in 2018. After almost terminating his contract in January, Ramos returned to the first-team in February 2019.

On 29 December 2021, Ramos signed with Primera Nacional club Club Agropecuario Argentino.

== Career statistics ==
Appearances and goals by club, season and competition
Club	Season	League			Cup		League Cup		Continental		Other		Total	
Club	Season	Division	Apps	Goals	Apps	Goals	Apps	Goals	Apps	Goals	Apps	Goals	Apps	Goals
Brown	2013–14	Primera B Nacional	0	0	2	0	—		—		0	0	2	0
Brown	2014	Primera B Metropolitana	0	0	0	0	—		—		0	0	0	0
Brown	2015	Primera B Metropolitana	0	0	0	0	—		—		0	0	0	0
Brown	Total		0	0	2	0	—		—		0	0	2	0
San Miguel	2017–18	Primera B Metropolitana	29	0	0	0	—		—		0	0	29	0
Almirante Brown	2018–19	Primera B Metropolitana	12	0	0	0	—		—		0	0	12	0
Career total			41	0	2	0	—		—		0	0	43	0

As of 25 April 2019.
