= Ezequiel Parnisari =

Argentine footballer (born 1990)

Personal information
- Full name: Oscar Ezequiel Jonathan Parnisari
- Date of birth: 1 June 1990 (age 36)
- Place of birth: San Luis, Argentina
- Height: 1.80 m (5 ft 11 in)
- Position: Centre-back

Team information
- Current team: San Martín Tucumán

Youth career
- 1999–2006: Sportivo Estudiantes
- 2006–2011: Olimpo

Senior career*
Years	Team	Apps	(Gls)
2011–2017	Olimpo	76	(1)
2013–2014	→ Deportivo Anzoátegui (loan)	22	(0)
2017–2018	Aldosivi	21	(0)
2018–2022	Agropecuario	78	(3)
2022–2024	Instituto	61	(3)
2024–2025	Unión La Calera	24	(1)
2025–2026	San Miguel	32	(0)
2026–	San Martín Tucumán	9	(0)
- * Club domestic league appearances and goals as of 17:20, 4 May 2026 (UTC)

Oscar Ezequiel Jonathan Parnisari (born 1 June 1990), known as Ezequiel Parnisari, is an Argentine professional footballer who plays as a centre-back for San Martín Tucumán.

== Career ==
Parnisari had a youth spell with Estudiantes before joining Olimpo. His senior career with Olimpo began in 2011, his debut arrived in November during a Copa Argentina match with Central Norte. He made eighteen league appearances over his first two seasons, which included his Argentine Primera División bow on 3 December in a draw versus Lanús. On 30 June 2013, Parnisari joined Venezuelan Primera División team Deportivo Anzoátegui on loan. His first appearance came against Independiente del Valle on 1 August, which preceded twenty-seven appearances in all competitions for Deportivo Anzoátegui.

He returned to Olimpo in May 2014 and went on to feature sixty-two times and score one goal, versus Vélez Sarsfield, in four following seasons. On 15 July 2017, Aldosivi of Primera B Nacional signed Parnisari. A year later, Agropecuario captured Parnisari. He scored on his league debut, netting a winner in a win over Santamarina. In January 2022, Parnisari moved to Instituto.

In 2024, he moved to Chile and joined Unión La Calera.

In January 2025, Parnisari joined Primera Nacional club San Miguel on a contract until December 2025.

== Career statistics ==
As of 11 September 2018.

Club statistics
Club	Season	League			Cup (Note: Includes the Copa Argentina and Copa Venezuela)		League Cup		Continental (Note: Includes the Copa Libertadores and Copa Sudamericana)		Other		Total	
Club	Season	Division	Apps	Goals	Apps	Goals	Apps	Goals	Apps	Goals	Apps	Goals	Apps	Goals
Olimpo	2011–12	Argentine Primera División	11	0	3	0	—		—		0	0	14	0
Olimpo	2012–13	Primera B Nacional	7	0	4	0	—		—		0	0	11	0
Olimpo	2013–14	Argentine Primera División	0	0	0	0	—		—		0	0	0	0
Olimpo	2014	Argentine Primera División	9	0	0	0	—		—		0	0	9	0
Olimpo	2015	Argentine Primera División	24	1	1	0	—		—		2 (Note: Two appearances in 2015 Argentine Primera División play-offs)	0	27	1
Olimpo	2016	Argentine Primera División	14	0	0	0	—		—		0	0	14	0
Olimpo	2016–17	Argentine Primera División	11	0	1	0	—		—		0	0	12	0
Olimpo	Total		76	1	9	0	—		—		2	0	87	1
Deportivo Anzoátegui (loan)	2013–14	Venezuelan Primera División	22	0	0	0	—		6 (Note: Two appearances in 2013 Copa Sudamericana, four appearances in 2014 Copa Libertadores)	0	0	0	28	0
Aldosivi	2017–18	Primera B Nacional	21	0	1	0	—		—		1 (Note: One appearance in 2017–18 Primera B Nacional play-offs)	0	23	0
Agropecuario	2018–19	Primera B Nacional	2	1	1	0	—		—		0	0	3	1
Career total			121	2	11	0	—		6	0	3	0	141	2

== Honours ==
Aldosivi

- Primera B Nacional: 2017–18
