= Martín Perafán =

Argentine footballer

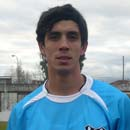

Personal information
- Full name: Pablo Martín Perafán
- Date of birth: 31 January 1987 (age 39)
- Place of birth: Villa Catella, Argentina
- Height: 1.91 m (6 ft 3 in)
- Position: Goalkeeper

Team information
- Current team: Guillermo Brown (on loan from Quilmes)

Youth career
- Gimnasia LP

Senior career*
Years	Team	Apps	(Gls)
2008	Villa San Carlos	20	(0)
2008	El Porvenir	20	(0)
2009	2 de Mayo	9	(0)
2009–2012	Defensa y Justicia	81	(0)
2012–2013	Unión Santa Fe	16	(0)
2013–2014	Vélez Sarsfield	0	(0)
2014–2015	Douglas Haig	55	(0)
2016	Juventud Unida Universitario	20	(0)
2016–2017	Douglas Haig	19	(0)
2017–2018	Villa Dálmine	25	(0)
2018–2019	Mitre	23	(0)
2019–2022	Agropecuario	13	(0)
2021	→ Curicó Unido (loan)	14	(0)
2022–	Quilmes	8	(0)
2022–	→ Guillermo Brown (loan)	7	(0)
- * Club domestic league appearances and goals as of 19:56, 24 July 2022 (UTC)

Pablo Martín Perafán (born 31 January 1987) is an Argentine professional footballer who plays as a goalkeeper for Guillermo Brown, on loan from Quilmes.

== Career ==
Perafán began in Gimnasia y Esgrima's youth. His senior career started in 2008, featuring in Primera C Metropolitana for Villa San Carlos and El Porvenir. In 2009, Perafán moved to Paraguayan football after agreeing to join 2 de Mayo. Nine appearances followed in the 2009 Paraguayan Primera División season. Perafán returned to Argentina with Defensa y Justicia in 2009, subsequently remaining for three campaigns whilst making eighty-one appearances; netting his first senior goal in the process on 9 June 2012 against Huracán. In July 2012, Argentine Primera División side Unión Santa Fe signed Perafán.

Having been selected sixteen times in 2012–13, Perafán joined his sixth career club on 28 July 2013 after completing a move to Vélez Sarsfield. He failed to feature competitively in twelve months, though was an unused substitute five times in all competitions. Perafán began playing for Douglas Haig in the 2014 Primera B Nacional campaign. Seventy-seven appearances followed for the club between 2014 and 2017, though the goalkeeper did spend the 2015 season with fellow second tier side Juventud Unida Universitario. A move to Villa Dálmine came in August 2017, prior to Perafán signing for Mitre a year later.

== Career statistics ==
As of 9 December 2018.

Club statistics
Club	Season	League			Cup (Note: Includes the Copa Argentina)		League Cup		Continental (Note: Includes the Copa Libertadores and Copa Sudamericana)		Other		Total	
Club	Season	Division	Apps	Goals	Apps	Goals	Apps	Goals	Apps	Goals	Apps	Goals	Apps	Goals
Villa San Carlos	2007–08	Primera C Metropolitana	20	0	0	0	—		—		0	0	20	0
El Porvenir	2008–09	Primera C Metropolitana	20	0	0	0	—		—		0	0	20	0
2 de Mayo	2009	Paraguayan Primera División	9	0	0	0	—		—		0	0	9	0
Defensa y Justicia	2009–10	Primera B Nacional	9	0	0	0	—		—		0	0	9	0
Defensa y Justicia	2010–11	Primera B Nacional	35	0	0	0	—		—		0	0	35	0
Defensa y Justicia	2011–12	Primera B Nacional	37	1	0	0	—		—		0	0	37	1
Defensa y Justicia	Total		81	1	0	0	—		—		0	0	81	1
Unión Santa Fe	2012–13	Argentine Primera División	16	0	0	0	—		—		0	0	16	0
Vélez Sarsfield	2013–14	Argentine Primera División	0	0	0	0	—		0	0	0	0	0	0
Douglas Haig	2014	Primera B Nacional	16	0	1	0	—		—		0	0	17	0
Douglas Haig	2015	Primera B Nacional	39	0	1	0	—		—		0	0	40	0
Douglas Haig	Total		55	0	2	0	—		—		0	0	57	0
Juventud Unida Universitario	2016	Primera B Nacional	20	0	2	0	—		—		0	0	22	0
Douglas Haig	2016–17	Primera B Nacional	19	0	1	0	—		—		0	0	20	0
Villa Dálmine	2017–18	Primera B Nacional	24	0	0	0	—		—		1 (Note: One appearance in the 2017–18 Primera B Nacional play-offs)	0	25	0
Mitre	2018–19	Primera B Nacional	10	0	0	0	—		—		0	0	10	0
Career total			274	1	5	0	—		0	0	1	0	280	1

== Honours ==
Vélez Sarsfield

- Supercopa Argentina: 2013
