= Mariano Miño =

Argentine footballer (born 1994)

Personal information
- Full name: Alan Mariano Miño
- Date of birth: 28 March 1994 (age 32)
- Place of birth: Tigre, Buenos Aires, Argentina
- Height: 1.60 m (5 ft 3 in)
- Position: Midfielder

Team information
- Current team: Quilmes

Youth career
- River Plate
- Comunicaciones

Senior career*
Years	Team	Apps	(Gls)
2016–2017	Boca Unidos	28	(3)
2017–2018	Sud América	10	(2)
2018	Toronto FC II	1	(0)
2018	Toronto FC	1	(0)
2018	→ Toronto FC II (loan)	4	(0)
2018–2019	Villa Dálmine	24	(3)
2019–2021	Agropecuario	29	(5)
2021–2024	Belgrano	57	(4)
2024	→ Delfín (loan)	26	(3)
2025–	Quilmes	15	(0)
- * Club domestic league appearances and goals as of 17:00, 26 June 2025 (UTC)

Alan Mariano Miño (born March 28, 1994) is an Argentinian footballer who plays for Quilmes.

== Early life ==
He was born in Tigre, Argentina and played in the youth system of River Plate for three years. His family then moved to Mercedes, Argentina where he spent the rest of his youth, playing in the system of Comunicaciones. He helped them win the 2015 Supercopa Correntina over Boca Unidos with a man of the match performance. In 2015, he fractured his tibia, which caused him to be out for six months.

== Playing career ==
After recovering from the injury, Miño began his professional career with Primera B Nacional side Boca Unidos, signing a three-year contract, but with the option for him to terminate the contract at any time. After the season, he trialed and then signed with Uruguayan Primera División side Sud América.

He then signed with Canadian club Toronto FC II in the United Soccer League ahead of their 2018 season. On 20 April 2018, he was signed to a deal with their parent club Toronto FC in Major League Soccer. He made his debut as a substitute on 21 April in a 5–1 loss against the Houston Dynamo in a match that the majority of the first-team missed, due to travelling for a CONCACAF Champions League match. He won a penalty kick in the 90th minute for the team after being fouled in the penalty area, but the resulting penalty kick was missed by teammate Ager Aketxe. On 30 June 2018, Miño was waived by Toronto, after making only one appearance for the first-team, and five with the second-team.

Afterwards, he returned to the Argentine second tier signing with Villa Dálmine. The following season he joined Agropecuario in the same division, on a multi-year contract. In March 2021, he joined Belgrano in the same division. In February 2024, he joined Delfín in the Ecuadorian Serie A on a one-year loan with a purchase option.

== Career statistics ==
As of 15 April 2024

Club	Season	League			Domestic Cup		Continental		Other		Total	
Club	Season	Division	Apps	Goals	Apps	Goals	Apps	Goals	Apps	Goals	Apps	Goals
Boca Unidos	2016–17	Primera Nacional	28	3	—		—		—		28	3
Sud América	2017	Primera División	10	2	—		—		—		10	2
Toronto FC II	2018	USL	5	0	—		—		—		5	0
Toronto FC	2018	Major League Soccer	1	0	0	0	0	0	0	0	1	0
Villa Dálmine	2018–19	Primera Nacional	24	3	1	0	—		—		25	3
Agropecuario	2019–20	Primera Nacional	21	4	—		—		—		21	4
Agropecuario	2020 (Note: Officially named the 2020 season, this season took place in 2020–21)	Primera Nacional	7	1	—		—		1 (Note: Appearances in 2020 Primera B Nacional Eliminatory Stage)	0	8	1
Agropecuario	Total		28	5	0	0	0	0	1	0	29	5
Belgrano	2021	Primera Nacional	23	0	—		—		—		23	0
Belgrano	2022	Primera Nacional	18	4	0	0	—		—		18	4
Belgrano	2023	Argentine Primera División	15	0	1	0	—		—		16	0
Belgrano	2024	Argentine Primera División	1	0	0	0	—		—		1	0
Belgrano	Total		57	4	1	0	0	0	0	0	58	4
Delfín (loan)	2024	Ecuadorian Serie A	6	1	0	0	2	0	—		8	1
Career total			159	18	2	0	2	0	1	0	164	18
