= Brian Blando =

Argentine professional footballer

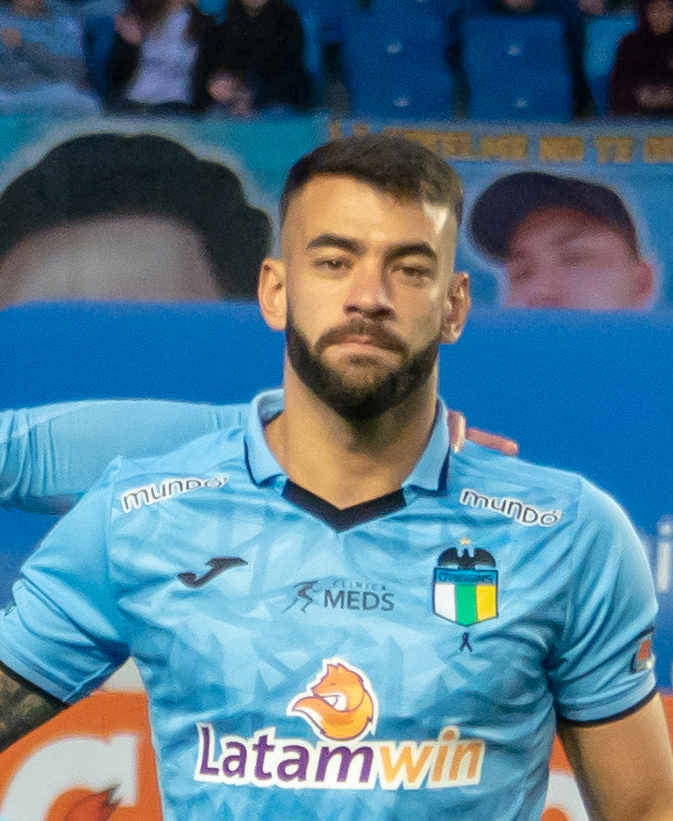
- Blando with O'Higgins in 2023

Personal information
- Full name: Brian Leonel Blando
- Date of birth: 1 April 1995 (age 31)
- Place of birth: Rosario, Argentina
- Height: 1.80 m (5 ft 11 in)
- Position: Forward

Team information
- Current team: Agropecuario

Youth career
- Rosario Central

Senior career*
Years	Team	Apps	(Gls)
2016–2022	Agropecuario	139	(27)
2022–2025	Lanús	22	(2)
2023	→ O'Higgins (loan)	14	(5)
2024	→ Melgar (loan)	25	(3)
2025–	Agropecuario	36	(5)
- * Club domestic league appearances and goals as of 17:42, 21 April 2026 (UTC)

Brian Leonel Blando (born 1 April 1995 in Rosario, Argentina) is an Argentine professional footballer who plays as forward for Agropecuario.

== Career ==
Blando began his career in Rosario Central's youth system, leaving in February 2016 to join Agropecuario of Torneo Federal B. He scored two goals in seventeen fixtures in 2016 as Agropecuario were promoted to Torneo Federal A; which was followed by a second consecutive promotion to Primera B Nacional. Blando's professional debut arrived on 24 September 2017 versus Flandria, which preceded his first pro goal in November during a 2–1 defeat to Deportivo Morón.

On 11 July 2022, Blando joined Argentine Primera División side Lanús on a deal until the end of 2025.

Ahead of the 2025 season, Blando rejoined Agropecuario after loans at Chilean Primera División side O'Higgins and Peruvian Primera División side Melgar.

== Career statistics ==
As of 6 November 2018.

Club statistics
Club	Season	League			Cup (Note: Includes the Copa Argentina)		League Cup		Continental		Other		Total	
Club	Season	Division	Apps	Goals	Apps	Goals	Apps	Goals	Apps	Goals	Apps	Goals	Apps	Goals
Agropecuario	2016	Torneo Federal B	17	2	0	0	—		—		0	0	17	2
Agropecuario	2016–17	Torneo Federal A	26	2	0	0	—		—		0	0	26	2
Agropecuario	2017–18	Primera B Nacional	20	2	0	0	—		—		2 (Note: Two appearances in the 2017–18 Primera B Nacional play-offs)	0	22	2
Agropecuario	2018–19	Primera B Nacional	8	1	1	0	—		—		0	0	9	1
Career total			71	7	1	0	—		—		2	0	74	7

== Honours ==
Agropecuario

- Torneo Federal A: 2016–17
