= Lucas Seimandi =

Argentine footballer

Personal information
- Full name: Lucas Seimandi
- Date of birth: 26 July 1993 (age 33)
- Place of birth: General Roca, Argentina
- Position: Midfielder

Team information
- Current team: Sportivo Belgrano

Senior career*
Years	Team	Apps	(Gls)
2016	Biblioteca Bell		
2016–2017	Centro Deportivo Roca		
2017	Sarmiento De Leones	22	(3)
2018	Sportivo Las Parejas	8	(0)
2018–2019	Agropecuario	4	(0)
2020	Mitre	5	(0)
2021	Olimpo	28	(1)
2022	Sportivo Desamparados	9	(0)
2022–	Sportivo Belgrano	9	(3)
- * Club domestic league appearances and goals as of 20:06, 14 August 2022 (UTC)

Lucas Seimandi (born 26 July 1993) is an Argentine professional footballer who plays as a midfielder for Sportivo Belgrano.

== Career ==
Seimandi signed for Biblioteca Bell in January 2016, prior to joining Centro Deportivo Roca. Seimandi joined Torneo Federal B club Sarmiento in 2017, scoring three goals in twenty-two appearances for the club. Sportivo Las Parejas completed the signing of Seimandi in 2018. Months later, after being selected in eight Torneo Federal A matches, Seimandi was signed by Agropecuario of Primera B Nacional. He made his professional debut on 5 November during a goalless draw with Sarmiento (J).

== Career statistics ==
As of 18 November 2018.

Club statistics
Club	Season	League			Cup (Note: Includes the Copa Argentina)		League Cup		Continental		Other		Total	
Club	Season	Division	Apps	Goals	Apps	Goals	Apps	Goals	Apps	Goals	Apps	Goals	Apps	Goals
Sarmiento	2017	Torneo Federal B	22	3	0	0	—		—		0	0	22	3
Sportivo Las Parejas	2017–18	Torneo Federal A	8	0	2	0	—		—		0	0	10	0
Agropecuario	2018–19	Primera B Nacional	1	0	0	0	—		—		0	0	1	0
Career total			31	3	2	0	—		—		0	0	33	3
