= Nahuel Gómez =

Argentine footballer

Personal information
- Full name: Ángel Nahuel Gómez
- Date of birth: 23 August 1996 (age 30)
- Place of birth: Villa Gobernador Gálvez, Argentina
- Height: 1.78 m (5 ft 10 in)
- Position: Defender

Team information
- Current team: Agropecuario

Youth career
- Defensores de Belgrano
- 2004–2017: Rosario Central

Senior career*
Years	Team	Apps	(Gls)
2017–2018	Rosario Central	3	(0)
2019–	Agropecuario	0	(0)
- * Club domestic league appearances and goals as of 20:14, 28 January 2019 (UTC)

Ángel Nahuel Gómez (born 23 August 1996) is an Argentine footballer who plays as a defender for Agropecuario.

== Career ==
Local side Defensores de Belgrano was Gómez's first team, which preceded him signing for Rosario Central on 7 April 2004 - he was moved into the senior squad thirteen years later. After being an unused substitute six times between December 2017 and April 2018, he made his professional debut against Belgrano in the Primera División on 7 April 2018. Gómez made two more appearances during 2017–18, including one in the 2018 Copa Sudamericana versus São Paulo on 12 April 2018. In December, Gómez terminated his contract with the club. A month later, Agropecuario of Primera B Nacional completed the signing of Gómez.

== Career statistics ==
As of 28 January 2019.

Club statistics
Club	Season	League			Cup		Continental		Other		Total	
Club	Season	Division	Apps	Goals	Apps	Goals	Apps	Goals	Apps	Goals	Apps	Goals
Rosario Central	2017–18	Primera División	2	0	0	0	1 (Note: Appearance(s) in the Copa Sudamericana)	0	0	0	3	0
Rosario Central	2018–19	Primera División	1	0	0	0	—		0	0	1	0
Rosario Central	Total		3	0	0	0	1	0	0	0	4	0
Agropecuario	2018–19	Primera B Nacional	0	0	0	0	—		0	0	0	0
Career total			3	0	0	0	1	0	0	0	4	0
