= Gino Albertengo =

Argentine footballer (born 2003)

Personal information
- Full name: Gino Agustín Albertengo
- Date of birth: 4 July 2003 (age 23)
- Place of birth: Egusquiza, Santa Fe, Argentina
- Height: 1.79 m (5 ft 10 in)
- Position: Striker

Team information
- Current team: Atlético Rafaela

Youth career
- Atlético Rafaela

Senior career*
Years	Team	Apps	(Gls)
2021–	Atlético Rafaela	37	(1)
2024	→ Unión Sunchales (loan)	11	(1)
2024	→ San Jorge (loan)	–	(–)
2025	→ San Luis (loan)	12	(0)
- * Club domestic league appearances and goals as of 13 January 2026

Gino Agustín Albertengo (born 4 July 2003) is an Argentine footballer who plays as a striker for Atlético Rafaela.

== Club career ==
Born in Egusquiza, Argentina, Albertengo started his career with Atlético Rafaela. He made his senior debut in the Copa Argentina match against Talleres on 2 March 2021 and signed his first professional contract on 29 April 2022.

In 2024, Albertengo had stints on loan with Unión de Sunchales and San Jorge. In January 2025, he moved to Chile and joined San Luis de Quillota on a one-year loan.

== Personal life ==
Gino is the younger brother of the professional footballers Mauro and Lucas Albertengo. His brother Martín played football at amateur level in the Liga Rafaelina.
