= Franco Colela =

Argentine footballer

Personal information
- Date of birth: 5 January 1995 (age 31)
- Place of birth: Remedios de Escalada, Argentina
- Position: Midfielder

Team information
- Current team: Club Atlético Banfield
- Number: 28

Senior career*
Years	Team	Apps	(Gls)
2016–2018	Club Atlético Banfield	17	(0)
2018–	Club Agropecuario Argentino	11	(0)
- * Club domestic league appearances and goals as of 23 February 2020

Franco Colela (born 5 January 1995) is an Argentine footballer who plays for Club Agropecuario Argentino as a midfielder.
