= Nicolás Dematei =

Argentine footballer (born 1987)

Personal information
- Full name: Nicolás Diego Dematei
- Date of birth: 19 November 1987 (age 38)
- Place of birth: Mercedes, Argentina
- Height: 1.75 m (5 ft 9 in)
- Position: Left-back

Team information
- Current team: Gimnasia Jujuy

Youth career
- Ateneo de la Juventud
- Flandria
- Sarmiento
- Argentinos Juniors

Senior career*
Years	Team	Apps	(Gls)
2008–2010	Argentinos Juniors	0	(0)
2008–2009	→ Atlético Tucumán (loan)	20	(0)
2010	Sarmiento		
2011	Defensa y Justicia	2	(0)
2011–2013	Sarmiento		
2013–2014	Instituto	17	(1)
2014–2015	Crucero del Norte	41	(1)
2016–2017	Guillermo Brown	57	(0)
2017–2018	Atlético de Rafaela	19	(0)
2018–2019	Independiente Rivadavia	27	(1)
2019–2022	Agropecuario	54	(3)
2022–2023	Almagro	29	(0)
2023–2024	Deportivo Riestra	43	(3)
2024–	Gimnasia Jujuy	59	(1)
- * Club domestic league appearances and goals as of 17:11, 28 April 2026 (UTC)

Nicolás Diego Dematei (born 19 November 1987) is an Argentine professional footballer who plays as a left-back for Gimnasia Jujuy.

== Career ==
Ateneo de la Juventud, Flandria and Sarmiento were Dematei's opening youth teams, prior to joining Argentinos Juniors. He was loaned to Atlético Tucumán in 2008, they selected him twenty times in the 2008–09 Primera B Nacional as they won promotion as champions. Dematei had stints with Sarmiento and Defensa y Justicia. After appearing twice for Florencio Varela team, he returned to Sarmiento on 30 June 2011. They won the 2011–12 Primera B Metropolitana title in his first season, which gave promotion to the second tier. He stayed for 2012–13, scoring his first Sarmiento goal against Aldosivi in the process.

Dematei switched clubs to Instituto on 30 June 2014. One goal and nineteen matches followed. Crucero del Norte signed Dematei ahead of the 2014 Primera B Nacional campaign, a competition that won them a place in the 2015 Primera División where the defender participated twenty-two times and netted versus Quilmes; though it ended with relegation down a division. Subsequent moves to Guillermo Brown and Atlético de Rafaela then came between 2016 and 2018. In the latter year, on 8 August, Dematei joined Independiente Rivadavia.

== Career statistics ==
As of 30 January 2019.

Club statistics
Club	Season	League			Cup		Continental		Other		Total	
Club	Season	Division	Apps	Goals	Apps	Goals	Apps	Goals	Apps	Goals	Apps	Goals
Argentinos Juniors	2008–09	Primera División	0	0	0	0	0	0	0	0	0	0
Argentinos Juniors	2009–10	Primera División	0	0	0	0	—		0	0	0	0
Argentinos Juniors	Total		0	0	0	0	0	0	0	0	0	0
Atlético Tucumán (loan)	2008–09	Primera B Nacional	20	0	0	0	—		0	0	20	0
Defensa y Justicia	2010–11	Primera B Nacional	2	0	0	0	—		0	0	2	0
Sarmiento	2012–13	Primera B Nacional	21	1	0	0	—		0	0	21	1
Instituto	2013–14	Primera B Nacional	17	1	2	0	—		0	0	19	1
Crucero del Norte	2014	Primera B Nacional	19	0	0	0	—		0	0	19	0
Crucero del Norte	2015	Primera División	22	1	0	0	—		0	0	22	1
Crucero del Norte	Total		41	1	0	0	—		0	0	41	1
Guillermo Brown	2016	Primera B Nacional	16	0	0	0	—		0	0	16	0
Guillermo Brown	2016–17	Primera B Nacional	41	0	0	0	—		0	0	41	0
Guillermo Brown	Total		57	0	0	0	—		0	0	57	0
Atlético de Rafaela	2017–18	Primera B Nacional	19	0	1	0	—		0	0	20	0
Independiente Rivadavia	2018–19	Primera B Nacional	13	1	0	0	—		0	0	13	1
Career total			190	4	3	0	0	0	0	0	193	4

== Honours ==
Atlético Tucumán

- Primera B Nacional: 2008–09

Sarmiento

- Primera B Metropolitana: 2011–12
