= Exequiel Narese =

Argentine footballer

Personal information
- Full name: Exequiel Albano Narese
- Date of birth: 8 March 1990 (age 36)
- Place of birth: San Miguel de Tucumán, Argentina
- Height: 1.70 m (5 ft 7 in)
- Position: Midfielder

Team information
- Current team: Agropecuario

Youth career
- San Martín Tucumán

Senior career*
Years	Team	Apps	(Gls)
2009–2012	San Martín Tucumán	5	(0)
2011–2012	→ San Jorge (loan)	31	(1)
2012–2013	San Jorge	30	(6)
2013–2015	Guaraní Antonio Franco	79	(7)
2016–2017	Juventud Unida	46	(1)
2017–2020	Agropecuario	68	(8)
2020	Fasano	15	(0)
2021	Mitre	25	(0)
2022–	Agropecuario	21	(2)
- * Club domestic league appearances and goals as of 19:36, 10 August 2022 (UTC)

Exequiel Albano Narese (born 8 March 1990) is an Argentine professional footballer who plays as a midfielder for Agropecuario.

== Career ==
Narese's career got underway in 2009 with San Martín, featuring for the Argentine Primera División club once in 2008–09; which ended with relegation. After four further appearances in Primera B Nacional in two seasons, Narese was loaned out during 2011–12 to Torneo Argentino B's San Jorge. A club that signed him permanently a year later, following one goal in thirty-one fixtures as San Jorge were promoted. Guaraní Antonio Franco completed the signing of Narese on 30 June 2013. Like with San Jorge, Narese achieved promotion in his first season. He scored his first pro goal in November 2014 versus San Martín (SJ).

2016 saw Narese join Juventud Unida of Primera B Nacional, remaining with the club for two seasons whilst netting once in forty-nine fixtures in all competitions. Narese joined fellow second tier team Agropecuario on 31 July 2017, subsequently scoring five times as Agropecuario reached the promotion play-offs; where they were eliminated by his former club, San Martín.

== Career statistics ==
As of 6 November 2018.

Club statistics
Club	Season	League			Cup (Note: Includes the Copa Argentina)		League Cup		Continental		Other		Total	
Club	Season	Division	Apps	Goals	Apps	Goals	Apps	Goals	Apps	Goals	Apps	Goals	Apps	Goals
San Martín	2008–09	Primera División	1	0	0	0	—		—		0	0	1	0
San Martín	2009–10	Primera B Nacional	1	0	0	0	—		—		0	0	1	0
San Martín	2010–11	Primera B Nacional	3	0	0	0	—		—		0	0	3	0
San Martín	2011–12	Torneo Argentino A	0	0	0	0	—		—		0	0	0	0
San Martín	Total		5	0	0	0	—		—		0	0	5	0
San Jorge (loan)	2011–12	Torneo Argentino B	31	1	0	0	—		—		2 (Note: Two appearances in the 2011–12 Torneo Argentino B play-offs)	2 (Note: Two goals in the 2011–12 Torneo Argentino B play-offs)	33	3
San Jorge	2012–13	Torneo Argentino A	30	6	1	0	—		—		2 (Note: Two appearances in the 2012–13 Torneo Argentino A play-offs)	0	33	6
San Jorge	Total		61	7	1	0	—		—		4	2	66	9
Guaraní Antonio Franco	2013–14	Torneo Argentino A	24	3	0	0	—		—		6 (Note: Six appearances in the 2013–14 Torneo Argentino A play-offs)	1 (Note: One goal in the 2013–14 Torneo Argentino A play-offs)	30	4
Guaraní Antonio Franco	2014	Primera B Nacional	20	1	0	0	—		—		0	0	20	1
Guaraní Antonio Franco	2015	Primera B Nacional	35	3	0	0	—		—		0	0	35	3
Guaraní Antonio Franco	Total		79	7	0	0	—		—		6	1	85	8
Juventud Unida	2016	Primera B Nacional	7	0	0	0	—		—		0	0	7	0
Juventud Unida	2016–17	Primera B Nacional	39	1	3	0	—		—		0	0	42	1
Juventud Unida	Total		46	1	3	0	—		—		0	0	49	1
Agropecuario	2017–18	Primera B Nacional	23	5	0	0	—		—		3 (Note: Three appearances in the 2017–18 Primera B Nacional play-offs)	0	26	5
Agropecuario	2018–19	Primera B Nacional	8	0	1	0	—		—		0	0	9	0
Agropecuario	Total		31	5	1	0	—		—		3	0	35	5
Career total			222	20	5	0	—		—		13	3	240	23
