= Emanuel Molina =

Argentine footballer

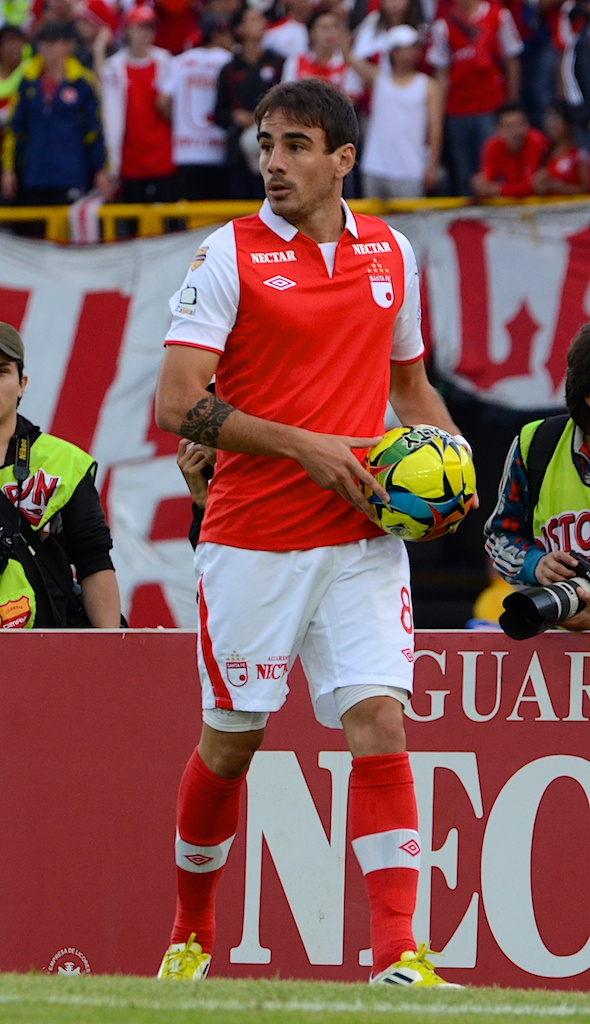
- Emanuel Molina

Personal information
- Full name: Jorge Emanuel Molina
- Date of birth: 4 March 1987 (age 39)
- Place of birth: Río Tercero, Argentina
- Height: 1.81 m (5 ft 11 1/2 in)
- Position: Midfielder

Team information
- Current team: Tristán Suárez

Youth career
- 2000–2005: Rio Tercero
- 2005–2008: Deportivo Merlo

Senior career*
Years	Team	Apps	(Gls)
2008	Deportivo Armenio		
2008–2010	Altay	41	(5)
2010	Deportivo Pasto	15	(3)
2011	Real Cartagena	32	(8)
2012	Vitória Guimarães	1	(0)
2012	Cúcuta Deportivo	17	(2)
2013	Santa Fe	23	(3)
2014	Deportivo Pasto	32	(4)
2015–2018	Atlético Tucumán	36	(9)
2018–2019	Villa Dálmine	23	(1)
2019–2021	Agropecuario	22	(1)
2021	Atlético de Rafaela	21	(0)
2022–	Tristán Suárez	17	(0)
- * Club domestic league appearances and goals as of 18:45, 4 August 2022 (UTC)

Jorge Emanuel Molina (born 4 March 1987) is an Argentine professional footballer who plays as a midfielder for Tristán Suárez.

== Career ==
Molina's career started in the youth ranks of Rio Tercero and Deportivo Merlo respectively. His senior career began with Deportivo Armenio, prior to a move to Turkish football to join TFF First League team Altay. For Altay, he participated in 41 league matches and scored 5 goals; he also featured six times in the Turkish Cup. He remained in Turkey between 2008 and 2010, he then joined Colombian Categoría Primera B side Deportivo Pasto in 2010. A year later, Molina agreed to sign for Real Cartagena of Categoría Primera A. He made his Real Cartagena debut on 5 February 2011 in a league win against Atlético Junior.

He scored his first goal for them in his fourth appearance on 27 February versus Once Caldas. 2012 saw Molina join Primeira Liga team Vitória Guimarães, but he left a few months later after just two appearances in all competitions. He returned to Colombian football in late 2012 and subsequently had spells with Cúcuta Deportivo and Santa Fe. Molina had a secondary spell with Deportivo Pasto in 2014, before joining Primera B Nacional side Atlético Tucumán in Argentina. 32 appearances and 9 goals followed for Molina as he helped Atlético Tucumán win promotion into the 2016 Argentine Primera División in his first season.

On 9 May 2017, it was confirmed Molina failed a drugs test after a match against Sarmiento in March. He tested positive for betamethasone, a substance that was banned in 2016. However, both the player and the club claimed Molina unknowingly consumed the substance in his recovery from a ligament rupture injury. He served an eight-month ban after being allowed to play again in January 2018. Six months later, Villa Dálmine of Primera B Nacional signed Molina.

== Career statistics ==
As of 12 September 2018.

Club statistics
Club	Season	League			Cup (Note: Includes the Copa Argentina.)		League Cup		Continental (Note: Includes the Copa Libertadores.)		Other		Total	
Club	Season	Division	Apps	Goals	Apps	Goals	Apps	Goals	Apps	Goals	Apps	Goals	Apps	Goals
Atlético Tucumán	2015	Primera B Nacional	32	9	1	0	—		—		0	0	33	9
Atlético Tucumán	2016	Primera División	1	0	0	0	—		—		0	0	1	0
Atlético Tucumán	2016–17	Primera División	3	0	0	0	—		1 (Note: One appearance in 2017 Copa Libertadores)	0	0	0	4	0
Atlético Tucumán	2017–18	Primera División	0	0	0	0	—		0	0	0	0	0	0
Atlético Tucumán	Total		36	9	1	0	—		1	0	0	0	38	9
Villa Dálmine	2018–19	Primera B Nacional	2	0	2	0	—		—		0	0	4	0
Career total			38	9	3	0	—		1	0	0	0	42	9

== Honours ==
Santa Fe

- Superliga Colombiana: 2013

Atlético Tucumán

- Primera B Nacional: 2015
