= Lucas Vesco =

Argentine footballer

Personal information
- Full name: Lucas Vesco
- Date of birth: 28 January 1991 (age 35)
- Place of birth: Quiroga, Argentina
- Height: 1.83 m (6 ft 0 in)
- Position: Defender

Team information
- Current team: Atlético de Carlos Casares

Senior career*
Years	Team	Apps	(Gls)
2008–2015	Rivadavia	68	(1)
2012–2013	→ Racing Club (loan)	0	(0)
2013–2014	→ Tigre (loan)	5	(0)
2016–2002	Agropecuario	82	(2)
2023	Nueva Chicago	21	(0)
2024	Ciudad Bolívar	23	(2)
2025-	Atlético de Carlos Casares		
- * Club domestic league appearances and goals as of 22:45, 7 January 2026 (UTC)

Lucas Vesco (born 28 January 1991) is an Argentine professional footballer who plays as a defender for Atlético de Carlos Casares.

== Career ==
Rivadavia were Vesco's first senior career club, the defender played for them between 2008 and 2015; making sixty-eight appearances and scoring one goal, which came against 9 de Julio on 27 February 2010. During his time with Rivadavia, Vesco was loaned out to Argentine Primera División sides on two occasions. Racing Club loaned Vesco in August 2012, he remained with them for one year but failed to feature for their first-team; though was on the substitutes bench once in November. On 22 July 2013, Vesco joined Tigre on loan. Five appearances followed, including his professional debut on 9 August versus Olimpo.

January 2016 saw Vesco agree to join Agropecuario of Torneo Federal B. They won promotion to the 2016–17 Torneo Federal A in his first season, prior to being promoted again in the following campaign to Primera B Nacional. He scored his first goal on 13 May 2017 during a win over Mitre, as he made forty-one appearances over the course of his first two seasons.

After passing through Ciudad Bolívar, in 2025 he became a player for Atlético de Carlos Casares.

== Career statistics ==
As of 4 November 2018.

Club statistics
Club	Season	League			Cup (Note: Includes the Copa Argentina)		League Cup		Continental (Note: Includes the Copa Sudamericana)		Other		Total	
Club	Season	Division	Apps	Goals	Apps	Goals	Apps	Goals	Apps	Goals	Apps	Goals	Apps	Goals
Racing Club (loan)	2012–13	Primera División	0	0	0	0	—		0	0	0	0	0	0
Tigre (loan)	2013–14	Primera División	5	0	0	0	—		—		0	0	5	0
Agropecuario	2016	Torneo Federal B	12	0	0	0	—		—		0	0	12	0
Agropecuario	2016–17	Torneo Federal A	29	1	0	0	—		—		0	0	29	1
Agropecuario	2017–18	Primera B Nacional	12	0	0	0	—		—		3 (Note: Three appearances in the 2017–18 Primera B Nacional play-offs)	0	15	0
Agropecuario	2018–19	Primera B Nacional	1	0	0	0	—		—		0	0	1	0
Agropecuario	Total		54	1	0	0	—		—		3	0	57	1
Career total			59	1	0	0	—		0	0	3	0	62	1

== Honours ==
Agropecuario

- Torneo Federal A: 2016–17
