= Antonio Napolitano (footballer) =

Argentine professional footballer

Personal information
- Date of birth: 16 February 1999 (age 27)
- Place of birth: La Plata, Argentina
- Height: 1.78 m (5 ft 10 in)
- Position: Midfielder

Team information
- Current team: Agropecuario

Youth career
- 2005–2020: Gimnasia LP

Senior career*
Years	Team	Apps	(Gls)
2020–2024	Gimnasia LP	19	(0)
2021–2022	→ Iraklis (loan)	13	(0)
2024–2025	Independiente Rivadavia	12	(0)
2025–2026	Chacarita Juniors	23	(1)
2026–	Agropecuario	7	(0)
- * Club domestic league appearances and goals as of 17:40, 21 April 2026 (UTC)

Antonio Napolitano (born 16 February 1999) is an Argentine professional footballer who plays as a midfielder for Agropecuario.

== Club career ==
In 2005, Napolitano joined Gimnasia y Esgrima; aged six. He spent the next fifteen years progressing through El Lobo's academy, notably moving into the reserves in 2016. On 25 February 2020, Napolitano was selected on the first-team's bench by manager Diego Maradona for a Copa Argentina round of sixty-four tie with Sportivo Barracas; though went unused. On 21 January 2021, he signed his first professional contract, penning terms until 2023. Napolitano's senior debut soon arrived, as he replaced Johan Carbonero in stoppage time of a Copa de la Liga Profesional victory over Talleres on 19 February; aged twenty-two.

== International career ==
In March 2018, Napolitano received a training call-up from the Argentina U19s.

== Style of play ==
Napolitano started out as an attacking midfielder, before transitioning into an all-rounder in midfield. He played in every position except goalkeeper and winger at various points in his youth career.

== Personal life ==
Napolitano is the son of Christian Napolitano, who also had a stint in the academy of Gimnasia y Esgrima; as did his uncle, José Luis, and cousin, Lautaro.

== Career statistics ==
As of 20 February 2021.

Appearances and goals by club, season and competition
Club	Season	League			Cup		League Cup		Continental		Other		Total	
Club	Season	Division	Apps	Goals	Apps	Goals	Apps	Goals	Apps	Goals	Apps	Goals	Apps	Goals
Gimnasia y Esgrima	2019–20	Primera División	0	0	0	0	0	0	—		0	0	0	0
Gimnasia y Esgrima	2020–21 (Note: Soccerway counts 2020 Copa de la Liga Profesional appearances as league appearances.)	Primera División	0	0	0	0	0	0	—		0	0	0	0
Gimnasia y Esgrima	2021 (Note: Soccerway counts 2021 Copa de la Liga Profesional appearances as league appearances.)	Primera División	1	0	0	0	—		—		0	0	1	0
Career total			1	0	0	0	0	0	—		0	0	1	0
