= Matías Molina =

Argentine professional footballer

Personal information
- Full name: Pablo Matías Daniel Molina
- Date of birth: 13 June 1993 (age 33)
- Place of birth: Ezeiza, Argentina
- Height: 1.82 m (6 ft 0 in)
- Position: Right-back

Team information
- Current team: Agropecuario

Youth career
- Tristán Suárez

Senior career*
Years	Team	Apps	(Gls)
2012–2018	Tristán Suárez	107	(5)
2016–2017	→ Gimnasia Jujuy (loan)	17	(0)
2018–2021	Atlanta	54	(1)
2021–2022	Sarmiento	8	(0)
2022–2023	Atlanta	25	(2)
2023–2024	Cuniburo	25	(3)
2024–2025	Almagro	32	(2)
2025–	Agropecuario	33	(0)
- * Club domestic league appearances and goals as of 17:31, 21 April 2026 (UTC)

Pablo Matías Daniel Molina (born 13 June 1993) is an Argentine professional footballer who plays as a right-back for Agropecuario.

== Club career ==
Molina's career started with Tristán Suárez. His first appearance arrived in December 2012 against Los Andes, which began a run of eight appearances in Primera B Metropolitana for the defender in 2012–13. In 2013–14, Molina scored the first two goals of his senior career after netting versus Flandria and Barracas Central respectively. He made a total of ninety-two appearances and scored four goals in five seasons with the club. In July 2016, Molina moved up to Primera B Nacional after penning a loan deal with Gimnasia y Esgrima. He featured seventeen times for them as they placed eighteenth in tier two.

After twenty-four games and one goal back with Tristán Suárez, Molina left on 30 June 2018 to sign for fellow Primera B Metropolitana team Atlanta. He made his debut against his former club, playing the full duration of a 4–0 victory over Tristán Suárez on 18 August. Molina played for Atlanta until February 2021, where he joined Sarmiento. However, he returned to Atlanta in January 2022.

== International career ==
Ahead of the 2016 Sait Nagjee Trophy in India, Molina was called up by Julio Olarticoechea's Argentina U23s.

== Career statistics ==
As of 27 April 2019.

Appearances and goals by club, season and competition
Club	Season	League			Cup		League Cup		Continental		Other		Total	
Club	Season	Division	Apps	Goals	Apps	Goals	Apps	Goals	Apps	Goals	Apps	Goals	Apps	Goals
Tristán Suárez	2012–13	Primera B Metropolitana	8	0	1	0	—		—		0	0	9	0
Tristán Suárez	2013–14	Primera B Metropolitana	23	2	0	0	—		—		0	0	23	2
Tristán Suárez	2014	Primera B Metropolitana	12	0	0	0	—		—		2 (Note: Appearance(s) in the Primera B Metropolitana play-offs)	0	14	0
Tristán Suárez	2015	Primera B Metropolitana	34	2	2	0	—		—		1	0	37	2
Tristán Suárez	2016	Primera B Metropolitana	9	0	0	0	—		—		0	0	9	0
Tristán Suárez	2016–17	Primera B Metropolitana	0	0	0	0	—		—		0	0	0	0
Tristán Suárez	2017–18	Primera B Metropolitana	21	1	0	0	—		—		3	0	24	1
Tristán Suárez	Total		107	5	3	0	—		—		6	0	116	5
Gimnasia y Esgrima (loan)	2016–17	Primera B Nacional	17	0	0	0	—		—		0	0	17	0
Atlanta	2018–19	Primera B Metropolitana	29	0	0	0	—		—		0	0	29	0
Career total			153	5	3	0	—		—		6	0	162	5
