= Alejandro Gagliardi =

Argentine footballer

Personal information
- Full name: Alejandro Fabián Gagliardi
- Date of birth: 6 August 1989 (age 37)
- Place of birth: Córdoba, Argentina
- Height: 1.77 m (5 ft 10 in)
- Position: Midfielder

Team information
- Current team: Agropecuario

Youth career
- Instituto

Senior career*
Years	Team	Apps	(Gls)
2007–2012	Instituto	125	(11)
2012–2013	Rosario Central	11	(1)
2013	All Boys	6	(0)
2014	Unión Santa Fe	11	(0)
2014–2015	Nueva Chicago	41	(15)
2016	Morelia	12	(1)
2016–2017	Patronato	23	(2)
2017–2018	Chacarita Juniors	16	(1)
2018	Santa Tecla	7	(0)
2019–2021	Agropecuario	7	(0)
2021–2022	Villa Dálmine	27	(0)
2022	Gimnasia (J)	13	(2)
2022–2023	Santamarina	16	(5)
2023–2024	Flandria	33	(8)
2024–	Agropecuario	71	(30)
- * Club domestic league appearances and goals as of 17:43, 21 April 2026 (UTC)

Alejandro Fabián Gagliardi (Italian: [ɡaʎˈʎardi]; born 6 August 1989) is an Argentine professional footballer who currently plays for Agropecuario.

Before joining Morelia, Gagliardi played the first eight years of his career in his home country of Argentina where he played in various first and second division clubs.

== Career ==
Gagliardi spent the first five years of his career playing for Primera B Nacional side Instituto in his hometown of Córdoba. In 2012, he moved to Primera B Nacional side Rosario Central where he spent the majority of the time on the bench, starting only 6 games during the 2012–13 Primera B Nacional season. That season, Rosario Central managed to win the league title, thus were promoted to the Argentine Primera División.

After being part of the triumph Rosario Central side, Gagliardi left the club in search of more playing time, he later signed with Argentine Primera División side All Boys. After playing a total of 99 minutes in six league and one cup match, Gagliardi left the club. He later went back to the Primera B Nacional after signing with Unión de Santa Fe where he played 11 matches. After his short stint with Santa Fe, Gagliardi joined Nueva Chicago for the 2014 Primera B Nacional.

Gagliardi played 19 matches (started 16) and scored 4 goals for Nueva Chicago as he helped the club get promoted to the Argentine Primera División. Gagliardi scored 11 goals in 22 matches for Nueva Chicago during the 2015 Argentine Primera División where he ranked fourth. Despite scoring 11 goals, Nueva Chicago was relegated to the Primera B Nacional after ending in 29th place in the relegation table.

On 19 December 2015, Gagliardi signed with Liga MX side Monarcas Morelia, his first club outside of Argentina.

On 9 August 2016, Monarcas Morelia announced that Gagliardi would be leaving the club in a mutual agreement.

In 2018, Gagliardi signed with Santa Tecla of the Salvadoran Primera División. But a serious injury in his left knee caused him to leave the team in October of the same year.

== Honours ==
Rosario Central

- Primera B Nacional: 2012–13
