= Mauro Albertengo =

Argentine footballer (born 1990)

Personal information
- Date of birth: 4 January 1990 (age 36)
- Place of birth: Egusquiza, Argentina
- Height: 1.85 m (6 ft 1 in)
- Position: Forward

Team information
- Current team: Colegiales

Youth career
- 2002–2011: Atlético de Rafaela

Senior career*
Years	Team	Apps	(Gls)
2011	San Isidro		
2012	Brown San Vicente		
2013–2014	Argentino de Quilmes	17	(6)
2014–2016	San Jorge	40	(9)
2016–2019	Atlético de Rafaela	71	(11)
2019–2020	Agropecuario	13	(0)
2020–2021	Sarmiento	6	(0)
2021–2022	Barracas Central	31	(6)
2022–2023	Atlético de Rafaela	13	(0)
2023–2024	Alvarado	32	(5)
2024–2025	Gimnasia Jujuy	34	(4)
2025–2026	Güemes	33	(3)
2026–	Colegiales	7	(0)
- * Club domestic league appearances and goals as of 17:27, 25 April 2026 (UTC)

Mauro Albertengo (born 4 January 1990) is an Argentine professional footballer who plays as a forward for Colegiales.

== Career ==
Mauro Albertengo, like brother Lucas, began in the youth teams of Atlético de Rafaela, he was with Rafaela for nine years before leaving to join San Isidro in 2011. Spells at Brown San Vicente, Argentino de Quilmes and San Jorge then followed between 2012 and 2016. In February 2016, Albertengo rejoined Argentine Primera División club Atlético de Rafaela and made his senior debut for Rafaela in a 2016 league defeat to San Martín on 3 March. In the following season, 2016–17, Albertengo scored his first goal for the club in a win over the aforementioned San Martín on 29 November. The season ended in relegation for Rafaela.

Albertengo completed a move to Agropecuario ahead of the 2019–20 campaign. He'd appear thirteen times, prior to the competition's curtailment due to the COVID-19 pandemic. In August 2020, Albertengo headed across Primera B Nacional to Sarmiento.

In March 2021, Albertengo signed with Barracas Central on a deal for the rest of the year. At the end of December 2021, he signed a contract extension with the club, until the end of 2022. On 30 May 2022, Albertengo moved to Atlético de Rafaela.

== Personal life ==
He is the brother of fellow footballer Lucas Albertengo.

== Career statistics ==
As of 25 October 2020.

Club statistics
Club	Season	League			Cup		League Cup		Continental		Other		Total	
Club	Season	Division	Apps	Goals	Apps	Goals	Apps	Goals	Apps	Goals	Apps	Goals	Apps	Goals
Atlético de Rafaela	2016	Primera División	5	0	1	0	—		—		0	0	6	0
Atlético de Rafaela	2016–17	Primera División	21	1	2	0	—		—		0	0	23	1
Atlético de Rafaela	2017–18	Primera B Nacional	24	6	1	0	—		—		1 (Note: Appearance(s) in the Primera B Nacional play-offs)	0	26	6
Atlético de Rafaela	2018–19	Primera B Nacional	21	4	4	2	—		—		0	0	25	6
Atlético de Rafaela	Total		71	11	8	2	—		—		1	0	80	13
Agropecuario	2019–20	Primera B Nacional	13	0	0	0	—		—		0	0	13	0
Sarmiento	2020–21	Primera B Nacional	0	0	0	0	—		—		0	0	0	0
Career total			84	11	8	2	—		—		1	0	93	13
