= Guaraní Antonio Franco =

- Full name: Club Deportivo Guaraní Antonio Franco
- Nickname: Franja
- Founded: 12 June 1932; 93 years ago
- Ground: Estadio Clemente de Oliveira, Posadas, Misiones
- Capacity: 12,000
- Chairman: Gustavo Cardozo
- Manager: José María Bianco
- League: Primera B Nacional
- 2015: 17°
Home colours	Away colours

Club Guaraní Antonio Franco is an Argentine football club from the city of Posadas, Misiones. The team currently plays in Torneo Regional Federal Amateur, the fourth and last league in Argentine Football league system.

The club played at the highest level of the Argentine football on 4 occasions. Guaraní A. Franco competed in the National tournaments of 1971, 1981, 1982 and 1985. Guaraní was eliminated in the first round group stage in all four attempts. In 2011–12 the club won the Torneo Argentino B championship promoting it to the upper division, Torneo Argentino A.

== Players ==
=== Current roster ===
Note: Flags indicate national team as defined under FIFA eligibility rules; some limited exceptions apply. Players may hold more than one non-FIFA nationality.

No.	Pos.	Nation	Player
—	GK	ARG	Alejandro Medina
—	GK	ARG	Facundo Vera
6	DF	ARG	Lautaro Formica
—	DF	ARG	Cristian Godoy
—	DF	ARG	Erik Jerez
—	DF	ARG	Cristian Leyes
—	DF	ARG	Brian Lopez
—	DF	ARG	Eros Medaglia
—	DF	COL	Josimar Mosquera
—	DF	ARG	Alan Vester
—	MF	ARG	Rodrigo Bareiro
—	MF	ARG	Cristian Barinaga
—	MF	ARG	Sebastian Battaglia
—	MF	ARG	Leandro Benitez

No.	Pos.	Nation	Player
—	MF	ARG	Enzo Bruno
—	MF	ARG	Dario Cardozo
—	MF	ARG	Ezequiel Ceballos
—	MF	ARG	Elian Kopp
—	MF	ARG	Exequiel Narese
—	MF	ARG	Sergio Sagarzazu
—	MF	ARG	Osvaldo Young
—	MF	ARG	Milton Zarate
—	MF	ARG	Maximiliano Zbrun
—	FW	ARG	Mauro Gomez
—	FW	ARG	Luciano Leguizamón
—	FW	ARG	Pablo Ostrowski
—	FW	ARG	Jorge Piñero Da Silva
