= 2016–17 Torneo Federal A =

IV Torneo Federal A
- Season: 2016–17
- Champions: Agropecuario Argentino (1st divisional title)
- Promoted: Agropecuario Argentino; Mitre (SdE)
- Relegated: General Belgrano; Concepción FC; Sol de América (F)
- Matches played: 516
- Goals scored: 1,168 (2.26 per match)
- Top goalscorer: Pablo Palacios Alvarenga (21 goals)
- Biggest home win: Gimnasia y Esgrima (CdU) 5-0 Sol de America (F) (April 9)
- Biggest away win: Concepción FC 2-6 Altos Hornos Zapla (November 13)
- Highest scoring: Juventud Antoniana 3-6 San Jorge (T) (October 7)
- All statistics correct as of July 16, 2017.

The 2016–17 Argentine Torneo Federal A was the 4th season of the third tier of the Argentine football league system. The tournament is reserved for teams indirectly affiliated to the Asociación del Fútbol Argentino (AFA), while teams affiliated to AFA have to play the Primera B Metropolitana, which is the other third tier competition. The champion was promoted to Primera B Nacional. 36 teams are competing in the league, 32 returning from the 2016 season, 1 team that was relegated from Primera B Nacional and 3 teams promoted from Federal B. The regular season began on September 3, 2016 and ended on July 16, 2017.

== Format ==
=== First stage ===
The teams were divided into six zones with five teams and one zone with six teams (a total of 36 teams) in each zone and it was played in a round-robin tournament whereby each team played each one of the other teams four times. The teams placed 1º and 2º from the zones with 5 teams, the teams placed 1º, 2º and 3º from the zone with six teams and the three best 3º team from the zones with five teams qualified for the Second Stage. The other eighteen teams qualify for the Revalida Stage.

=== Championship stages ===
==== Second stage ====
The teams were divided into two zones with nine teams each and it was played in a round-robin tournament whereby each team played each one of the other teams one time. The teams placed 1º and 2º and the best 3º team from the two zones qualified for the Third Stage or Pentagonal Final. The other thirteen (13) teams qualify for the Revalida Stage.

==== Third stage ====
The five teams that qualified for the third stage or Pentagonal Final play in a round-robin tournament whereby each team played each one of the other teams one time. The winner was declared champion and automatically promoted to the Primera B Nacional. The other four teams qualify for the Fifth Phase of the Revalida Stage.

=== Revalida stages ===
The Revalida Stage is divided in several phases: First, the eighteen teams that did not qualify for the Championship Stages were divided into three zones with six teams each and it was played in a round-robin tournament whereby each team played each one of the other teams two times. The teams placed 1º and 2º from the three zones qualified for the Second Phase. The second phase is played between the six teams that qualified from the First Phase. The tree winners qualify for the Third Phase. The Third, Fourth, Five, Sixth and Seventh Phase of the Revalida Stage is played between the other teams that did not qualify for the Championship Stages or were eliminated from it and aims to get the Second promotion to the Primera B Nacional.

=== Relegation ===
After the First Phase of the Revalida Stage a table was drawn up with the average of points obtained in the First Stage and the First Phase of the Revalida Stage it is determined by dividing the points by the number of games played and the bottom team of each three zones was relegated to Torneo Federal B.

== Club information ==
Locations of the 2016-17 season teams.
Blue: Zone A; Yellow: Zone B;
Green: Zone C; Red: Zone D
Purple: Zone E; Orange: Zone F;
Brown: Zone G.

=== Zone A ===
| Team | City | Stadium |
|---|---|---|
| Cipolletti | Cipolletti | La Visera de Cemento |
| Deportivo Madryn | Puerto Madryn | Coliseo del Golfo |
| Deportivo Roca | General Roca | Luis Maiolino |
| Independiente | Neuquén | José Rosas y Perito Moreno |
| Villa Mitre | Bahía Blanca | El Fortín |

=== Zone B ===
| Team | City | Stadium |
|---|---|---|
| Agropecuario Argentino | Carlos Casares | De La Calle Carlos Arroyo |
| Alvarado | Mar del Plata | (None) ^{1} |
| Defensores de Belgrano | Villa Ramallo | Salomón Boeseldín |
| Ferro Carril Oeste | General Pico | El Coloso del Barrio Talleres |
| General Belgrano | Santa Rosa | Nuevo Rancho Grande |
| Rivadavia | Lincoln | El Coliseo |

^{1} Play their home games at Estadio José María Minella.

=== Zone C ===
| Team | City | Stadium |
|---|---|---|
| Deportivo Maipú | Maipú | Higinio Sperdutti |
| Desamparados | San Juan | El Serpentario |
| Gimnasia y Esgrima | Mendoza | Víctor Antonio Legrotaglie |
| Gutiérrez | General Gutiérrez | General Gutiérrez |
| Unión | Villa Krause | 12 de Octubre |

=== Zone D ===
| Team | City | Stadium |
|---|---|---|
| Juventud Unida Universitario | San Luis | Mario Diez |
| Mitre | Santiago del Estero | Doctores José y Antonio Castiglione |
| San Lorenzo | Catamarca | Bicentenario Ciudad de Catamarca |
| Sportivo Belgrano | San Francisco | Oscar Boero |
| Unión Aconquija | Aconquija | Municipal de Aconquija |

=== Zone E ===
| Team | City | Stadium |
|---|---|---|
| Altos Hornos Zapla | Palpalá | Emilio Fabrizzi |
| Concepción | Concepción | Stewart Shipton |
| Gimnasia y Tiro | Salta | Gigante del Norte |
| Juventud Antoniana | Salta | Fray Honorato Pistoia |
| San Jorge | San Miguel de Tucumán | Senador Luis Cruz |

=== Zone F ===
| Team | City | Stadium |
|---|---|---|
| Chaco For Ever | Resistencia | Juan Alberto García |
| Guaraní Antonio Franco | Posadas | Clemente F. de Oliveira |
| Sarmiento | Resistencia | Centenario |
| Sol de América | Formosa | (None)^{1} |
| Sportivo Patria | Formosa | Antonio Romero |

^{1} Play their home games at Estadio Antonio Romero.

=== Zone G ===
| Team | City | Stadium |
|---|---|---|
| Defensores | Pronunciamiento | Delio Cardozo |
| Gimnasia y Esgrima | Concepción del Uruguay | Manuel y Ramón Núñez |
| Libertad | Sunchales | Hogar de Los Tigres |
| Sportivo Las Parejas | Las Parejas | Fortaleza del Lobo |
| Unión | Sunchales | La Fortaleza |

== First stage ==
=== Zone A ===
| Pos | Team | Pld | W | D | L | GF | GA | GD | Pts | Qualification |
|---|---|---|---|---|---|---|---|---|---|---|
| 1 | Cipolletti | 16 | 7 | 5 | 4 | 20 | 12 | +8 | 26 | Advance to Championship Stages and 2016–17 Copa Argentina |
| 2 | Deportivo Madryn | 16 | 7 | 5 | 4 | 21 | 17 | +4 | 26 | Advance to Championship Stages and 2016–17 Copa Argentina |
| 3 | Villa Mitre | 16 | 7 | 4 | 5 | 23 | 21 | +2 | 25 | Advance to Championship Stages |
| 4 | Deportivo Roca | 16 | 4 | 7 | 5 | 12 | 20 | −8 | 19 | Advance to Reválida Stage |
| 5 | Independiente (N) | 16 | 3 | 3 | 10 | 18 | 24 | −6 | 12 | Advance to Reválida Stage |

Source: AFA
Rules for classification: 1) points; 2) head-to-head points; 3) goal difference; 4 goal scored; 5) away goals scored; 6) draw of lots.

==== Results ====
===== Matches 1–8 =====
| Home \ Away | CIP | DMA | DRO | INE | VMI |
|---|---|---|---|---|---|
| Cipolletti | | 1–1 | 4–1 | 1–1 | 2–3 |
| Deportivo Madryn | 1–1 | | 1–2 | 2–1 | 2–1 |
| Deportivo Roca | 0–0 | 1–1 | | 1–0 | 1–1 |
| Independiente (N) | 0–1 | 1–2 | 3–1 | | 0–0 |
| Villa Mitre | 0–2 | 1–0 | 2–0 | 3–2 | |

Updated to match(es) played on unknown. Source: AFA
Legend: Blue = home team win; Yellow = draw; Red = away team win.

===== Matches 9–16 =====
| Home \ Away | CIP | DMA | DRO | INE | VMI |
|---|---|---|---|---|---|
| Cipolletti | | 0–1 | 3–0 | 1–0 | 1–0 |
| Deportivo Madryn | 2–0 | | 0–0 | 1–1 | 3–2 |
| Deportivo Roca | 1–1 | 1–0 | | 2–1 | 0–0 |
| Independiente (N) | 0–2 | 0–3 | 2–0 | | 4–1 |
| Villa Mitre | 1–0 | 4–1 | 1–1 | 3–2 | |

Updated to match(es) played on unknown. Source: AFA
Legend: Blue = home team win; Yellow = draw; Red = away team win.

=== Zone B ===
| Pos | Team | Pld | W | D | L | GF | GA | GD | Pts | Qualification |
|---|---|---|---|---|---|---|---|---|---|---|
| 1 | Alvarado | 20 | 8 | 7 | 5 | 20 | 12 | +8 | 31 | Advance to Championship Stages and 2016–17 Copa Argentina |
| 2 | Defensores de Belgrano (VR) | 20 | 7 | 9 | 4 | 24 | 18 | +6 | 30 | Advance to Championship Stages and 2016–17 Copa Argentina |
| 3 | Agropecuario Argentino | 20 | 7 | 9 | 4 | 23 | 18 | +5 | 30 | Advance to Championship Stages |
| 4 | Ferro Carril Oeste (GP) | 20 | 7 | 8 | 5 | 26 | 18 | +8 | 29 | Advance to Reválida Stage |
| 5 | Rivadavia (L) | 20 | 5 | 7 | 8 | 18 | 31 | −13 | 22 | Advance to Reválida Stage |
| 6 | General Belgrano | 20 | 3 | 6 | 11 | 16 | 30 | −14 | 15 | Advance to Reválida Stage |

Source: AFA
Rules for classification: 1) points; 2) head-to-head points; 3) goal difference; 4 goal scored; 5) away goals scored; 6) draw of lots.

==== Results ====
===== Matches 1–10 =====
| Home \ Away | AGA | ALV | DEF | FCO | GBE | RIV |
|---|---|---|---|---|---|---|
| Agrop. Argentino | | 1–0 | 1–1 | 0–0 | 3–0 | 0–1 |
| Alvarado | 1–1 | | 2–1 | 1–1 | 1–0 | 4–0 |
| Def. de Belg. (VR) | 1–1 | 0–0 | | 0–1 | 4–1 | 1–1 |
| Ferro C. O. (GP) | 0–2 | 1–1 | 0–1 | | 3–1 | 2–0 |
| General Belgrano | 2–2 | 0–1 | 2–1 | 0–0 | | 2–3 |
| Rivadavia (L) | 0–0 | 1–1 | 2–2 | 2–2 | 0–0 | |

Updated to match(es) played on unknown. Source: AFA
Legend: Blue = home team win; Yellow = draw; Red = away team win.

===== Matches 11–20 =====
| Home \ Away | AGA | ALV | DEF | FCO | GBE | RIV |
|---|---|---|---|---|---|---|
| Agrop. Argentino | | 1–0 | 1–1 | 1–1 | 2–0 | 3–0 |
| Alvarado | 3–0 | | 0–0 | 1–0 | 0–1 | 2–1 |
| Def. de Belg. (VR) | 4–1 | 1–0 | | 0–0 | 1–0 | 2–1 |
| Ferro C. O. (GP) | 3–2 | 0–1 | 1–2 | | 2–0 | 3–0 |
| General Belgrano | 0–0 | 1–1 | 1–1 | 1–4 | | 4–0 |
| Rivadavia (L) | 0–1 | 1–0 | 2–0 | 2–2 | 1–0 | |

Updated to match(es) played on unknown. Source: AFA
Legend: Blue = home team win; Yellow = draw; Red = away team win.

=== Zone C ===
| Pos | Team | Pld | W | D | L | GF | GA | GD | Pts | Qualification |
|---|---|---|---|---|---|---|---|---|---|---|
| 1 | Gimnasia y Esgrima (M) | 16 | 7 | 6 | 3 | 24 | 11 | +13 | 27 | Advance to Championship Stages and 2016–17 Copa Argentina |
| 2 | Unión (VK) | 16 | 3 | 12 | 1 | 16 | 15 | +1 | 21 | Advance to Championship Stages and 2016–17 Copa Argentina |
| 3 | Deportivo Maipú | 16 | 4 | 8 | 4 | 13 | 15 | −2 | 20 | Advance to Reválida Stage |
| 4 | Gutiérrez SC | 16 | 3 | 7 | 6 | 17 | 20 | −3 | 16 | Advance to Reválida Stage |
| 5 | Desamparados | 16 | 3 | 7 | 6 | 12 | 21 | −9 | 16 | Advance to Reválida Stage |

Source: AFA
Rules for classification: 1) points; 2) head-to-head points; 3) goal difference; 4 goal scored; 5) away goals scored; 6) draw of lots.

==== Results ====
===== Matches 1–8 =====
| Home \ Away | DEM | DES | GEM | GSC | UVK |
|---|---|---|---|---|---|
| Deportivo Maipú | | 1–1 | 0–2 | 4–1 | 1–1 |
| Desamparados | 2–0 | | 0–0 | 2–0 | 0–0 |
| Gimnasia y Esgrima (M) | 0–0 | 4–1 | | 1–0 | 3–0 |
| Gutiérrez SC | 0–0 | 3–0 | 1–2 | | 0–1 |
| Unión (VK) | 0–0 | 3–1 | 1–1 | 0–0 | |

Updated to match(es) played on unknown. Source: AFA
Legend: Blue = home team win; Yellow = draw; Red = away team win.

===== Matches 9–16 =====
| Home \ Away | DEM | DES | GEM | GSC | UVK |
|---|---|---|---|---|---|
| Deportivo Maipú | | 2–0 | 1–0 | 2–2 | 0–0 |
| Desamparados | 0–1 | | 2–2 | 1–0 | 2–2 |
| Gimnasia y Esgrima (M) | 3–0 | 3–0 | | 1–2 | 2–2 |
| Gutiérrez SC | 2–0 | 0–0 | 0–0 | | 3–3 |
| Unión (VK) | 1–1 | 0–0 | 1–0 | 1–1 | |

Updated to match(es) played on unknown. Source: AFA
Legend: Blue = home team win; Yellow = draw; Red = away team win.

=== Zone D ===
| Pos | Team | Pld | W | D | L | GF | GA | GD | Pts | Qualification |
|---|---|---|---|---|---|---|---|---|---|---|
| 1 | Mitre (SdE) | 16 | 6 | 6 | 4 | 15 | 12 | +3 | 24 | Advance to Championship Stages and 2016–17 Copa Argentina |
| 2 | Unión Aconquija | 16 | 5 | 7 | 4 | 14 | 12 | +2 | 22 | Advance to Championship Stages and 2016–17 Copa Argentina |
| 3 | Juventud Unida Universitario | 16 | 5 | 5 | 6 | 15 | 13 | +2 | 20 | Advance to Reválida Stage |
| 4 | San Lorenzo (A) | 16 | 3 | 10 | 3 | 16 | 19 | −3 | 19 | Advance to Reválida Stage |
| 5 | Sportivo Belgrano | 16 | 5 | 4 | 7 | 17 | 21 | −4 | 19 | Advance to Reválida Stage |

Source: AFA
Rules for classification: 1) points; 2) head-to-head points; 3) goal difference; 4 goal scored; 5) away goals scored; 6) draw of lots.

==== Results ====
===== Matches 1–8 =====
| Home \ Away | JUU | MIT | SLA | SPB | UAC |
|---|---|---|---|---|---|
| Juventud Unida Univ. | | 0–0 | 4–1 | 0–2 | 1–2 |
| Mitre (SdE) | 0–0 | | 3–0 | 3–0 | 1–0 |
| San Lorenzo (A) | 1–1 | 1–0 | | 3–1 | 1–1 |
| Sportivo Belgrano | 1–3 | 3–1 | 0–0 | | 3–2 |
| Unión Aconquija | 1–0 | 0–0 | 0–0 | 2–1 | |

Updated to match(es) played on unknown. Source: AFA
Legend: Blue = home team win; Yellow = draw; Red = away team win.

===== Matches 9–16 =====
| Home \ Away | JUU | MIT | SLA | SPB | UAC |
|---|---|---|---|---|---|
| Juventud Unida Univ. | | 1–0 | 1–1 | 1–0 | 0–1 |
| Mitre (SdE) | 1–0 | | 2–2 | 2–0 | 0–0 |
| San Lorenzo (A) | 1–3 | 1–1 | | 2–2 | 0–0 |
| Sportivo Belgrano | 1–0 | 0–1 | 0–0 | | 2–0 |
| Unión Aconquija | 0–0 | 4–0 | 0–2 | 1–1 | |

Updated to match(es) played on unknown. Source: AFA
Legend: Blue = home team win; Yellow = draw; Red = away team win.

=== Zone E ===
| Pos | Team | Pld | W | D | L | GF | GA | GD | Pts | Qualification |
|---|---|---|---|---|---|---|---|---|---|---|
| 1 | Gimnasia y Tiro | 16 | 9 | 3 | 4 | 36 | 25 | +11 | 30 | Advance to Championship Stages and 2016–17 Copa Argentina |
| 2 | Altos Hornos Zapla | 16 | 7 | 6 | 3 | 28 | 18 | +10 | 27 | Advance to Championship Stages and 2016–17 Copa Argentina |
| 3 | Juventud Antoniana | 16 | 7 | 3 | 6 | 23 | 23 | 0 | 24 | Advance to Championship Stages |
| 4 | Concepción FC | 16 | 5 | 1 | 10 | 16 | 32 | −16 | 16 | Advance to Reválida Stage |
| 5 | San Jorge (T) | 16 | 4 | 3 | 9 | 20 | 25 | −5 | 15 | Advance to Reválida Stage |

Source: AFA
Rules for classification: 1) points; 2) head-to-head points; 3) goal difference; 4 goal scored; 5) away goals scored; 6) draw of lots.

==== Results ====
===== Matches 1–8 =====
| Home \ Away | AHZ | CFC | GYT | JUA | SJT |
|---|---|---|---|---|---|
| Altos Hornos Zapla | | 2–1 | 2–2 | 1–0 | 4–1 |
| Concepción FC | 1–1 | | 1–3 | 1–0 | 2–1 |
| Gimnasia y Tiro | 2–2 | 3–0 | | 0–1 | 1–0 |
| Juventud Antoniana | 3–1 | 2–0 | 2–2 | | 3–6 |
| San Jorge (T) | 0–1 | 2–0 | 0–2 | 1–1 | |

Updated to match(es) played on unknown. Source: AFA
Legend: Blue = home team win; Yellow = draw; Red = away team win.

===== Matches 9–16 =====
| Home \ Away | AHZ | CFC | GYT | JUA | SJT |
|---|---|---|---|---|---|
| Altos Hornos Zapla | | 1–0 | 2–3 | 0–1 | 1–1 |
| Concepción FC | 2–6 | | 2–3 | 2–1 | 1–0 |
| Gimnasia y Tiro | 1–4 | 4–0 | | 5–3 | 3–0 |
| Juventud Antoniana | 0–0 | 2–0 | 2–1 | | 2–1 |
| San Jorge (T) | 0–0 | 1–3 | 4–1 | 2–0 | |

Updated to match(es) played on unknown. Source: AFA
Legend: Blue = home team win; Yellow = draw; Red = away team win.

=== Zone F ===
| Pos | Team | Pld | W | D | L | GF | GA | GD | Pts | Qualification |
|---|---|---|---|---|---|---|---|---|---|---|
| 1 | Sarmiento (R) | 16 | 6 | 8 | 2 | 19 | 7 | +12 | 26 | Advance to Championship Stages and 2016–17 Copa Argentina |
| 2 | Chaco For Ever | 16 | 7 | 5 | 4 | 15 | 14 | +1 | 26 | Advance to Championship Stages and 2016–17 Copa Argentina |
| 3 | Sportivo Patria | 16 | 6 | 6 | 4 | 15 | 11 | +4 | 24 | Advance to Championship Stages |
| 4 | Sol de América (F) | 16 | 3 | 6 | 7 | 13 | 22 | −9 | 15 | Advance to Reválida Stage |
| 5 | Guaraní Antonio Franco | 16 | 3 | 5 | 8 | 15 | 23 | −8 | 14 | Advance to Reválida Stage |

Source: AFA
Rules for classification: 1) points; 2) head-to-head points; 3) goal difference; 4 goal scored; 5) away goals scored; 6) draw of lots.

==== Results ====
===== Matches 1–8 =====
| Home \ Away | CFE | GAF | SAR | SOL | SPP |
|---|---|---|---|---|---|
| Chaco For Ever | | 1–1 | 1–0 | 0–2 | 0–2 |
| Guaraní Antonio Franco | 1–2 | | 1–2 | 2–2 | 1–1 |
| Sarmiento (R) | 1–1 | 2–0 | | 0–0 | 0–0 |
| Sol de América (F) | 1–2 | 0–2 | 0–0 | | 1–2 |
| Sportivo Patria | 0–1 | 1–0 | 0–0 | 3–0 | |

Source: AFA
Legend: Blue = home team win; Yellow = draw; Red = away team win.

===== Matches 9–16 =====
| Home \ Away | CFE | GAF | SAR | SOL | SPP |
|---|---|---|---|---|---|
| Chaco For Ever | | 1–0 | 1–1 | 1–0 | 2–0 |
| Guaraní Antonio Franco | 1–1 | | 1–0 | 3–1 | 1–2 |
| Sarmiento (R) | 2–0 | 4–0 | | 3–0 | 2–0 |
| Sol de América (F) | 2–1 | 1–1 | 1–1 | | 0–0 |
| Sportivo Patria | 0–0 | 2–0 | 1–1 | 1–2 | |

Source: AFA
Legend: Blue = home team win; Yellow = draw; Red = away team win.

=== Zone G ===
| Pos | Team | Pld | W | D | L | GF | GA | GD | Pts | Qualification |
|---|---|---|---|---|---|---|---|---|---|---|
| 1 | Unión (S) | 16 | 8 | 3 | 5 | 26 | 18 | +8 | 27 | Advance to Championship Stages and 2016–17 Copa Argentina |
| 2 | Sportivo Las Parejas | 16 | 5 | 7 | 4 | 22 | 23 | −1 | 22 | Advance to Championship Stages and 2016–17 Copa Argentina |
| 3 | Gimnasia y Esgrima (CdU) | 16 | 5 | 7 | 4 | 13 | 13 | 0 | 22 | Advance to Reválida Stage |
| 4 | Defensores (P) | 16 | 5 | 3 | 8 | 16 | 18 | −2 | 18 | Advance to Reválida Stage |
| 5 | Libertad (S) | 16 | 4 | 6 | 6 | 18 | 23 | −5 | 18 | Advance to Reválida Stage |

Source: AFA
Rules for classification: 1) points; 2) head-to-head points; 3) goal difference; 4 goal scored; 5) away goals scored; 6) draw of lots.

==== Results ====
===== Matches 1–8 =====
| Home \ Away | DPR | GYE | LIB | SLP | UNS |
|---|---|---|---|---|---|
| Defensores (P) | | 0–0 | 3–1 | 2–0 | 2–1 |
| Gimnasia y Esg. (CdU) | 1–0 | | 1–1 | 0–0 | 1–0 |
| Libertad (S) | 3–1 | 2–1 | | 1–1 | 2–1 |
| Sportivo Las Parejas | 1–0 | 1–1 | 0–0 | | 3–2 |
| Unión (S) | 3–0 | 1–0 | 3–1 | 4–1 | |

Source: AFA
Legend: Blue = home team win; Yellow = draw; Red = away team win.

===== Matches 9–16 =====
| Home \ Away | DPR | GYE | LIB | SLP | UNS |
|---|---|---|---|---|---|
| Defensores (P) | | 0–1 | 2–0 | 1–2 | 0–1 |
| Gimnasia y Esg. (CdU) | 1–1 | | 0–0 | 1–1 | 1–0 |
| Libertad (S) | 0–2 | 1–3 | | 2–0 | 1–1 |
| Sportivo Las Parejas | 1–1 | 4–1 | 3–2 | | 1–1 |
| Unión (S) | 2–1 | 1–0 | 1–1 | 4–3 | |

Source: AFA
Legend: Blue = home team win; Yellow = draw; Red = away team win.

=== Ranking of third-placed teams ===
| Pos | Grp | Team | Pld | W | D | L | GF | GA | GD | Pts | Qualification |
|---|---|---|---|---|---|---|---|---|---|---|---|
| 1 | A | Villa Mitre | 16 | 7 | 4 | 5 | 23 | 21 | +2 | 25 | Advance to Championship Stages |
| 2 | F | Sportivo Patria | 16 | 6 | 6 | 4 | 15 | 11 | +4 | 24 | Advance to Championship Stages |
| 3 | E | Juventud Antoniana | 16 | 7 | 3 | 6 | 23 | 23 | 0 | 24 | Advance to Championship Stages |
| 4 | G | Gimnasia y Esgrima (CdU) | 16 | 5 | 7 | 4 | 13 | 13 | 0 | 22 | |
| 5 | D | Juventud Unida Universitario | 16 | 5 | 5 | 6 | 15 | 13 | +2 | 20 | |
| 6 | C | Deportivo Maipú | 16 | 4 | 8 | 4 | 13 | 15 | −2 | 20 | |

Rules for classification: 1) points; 2) goal difference; 3) goal scored; 4) away goals scored; 5) draw of lots.

== Championship stages ==
=== Second stage ===
==== Zone A ====
| Pos | Team | Pld | W | D | L | GF | GA | GD | Pts | Qualification |
|---|---|---|---|---|---|---|---|---|---|---|
| 1 | Gimnasia y Tiro | 8 | 6 | 1 | 1 | 15 | 7 | +8 | 19 | Advance to Third Stage |
| 2 | Mitre (SdE) | 8 | 5 | 1 | 2 | 12 | 8 | +4 | 16 | Advance to Third Stage |
| 3 | Sportivo Patria | 8 | 4 | 2 | 2 | 11 | 11 | 0 | 14 | Advance to Third Phase of Reválida Stage |
| 4 | Sarmiento (R) | 8 | 3 | 4 | 1 | 10 | 9 | +1 | 13 | Advance to Third Phase of Reválida Stage |
| 5 | Unión (VK) | 8 | 3 | 3 | 2 | 7 | 5 | +2 | 12 | Advance to Third Phase of Reválida Stage |
| 6 | Unión Aconquija | 8 | 3 | 0 | 5 | 10 | 10 | 0 | 9 | Advance to Third Phase of Reválida Stage |
| 7 | Juventud Antoniana | 8 | 2 | 1 | 5 | 3 | 8 | −5 | 7 | Advance to Third Phase of Reválida Stage |
| 8 | Chaco For Ever | 8 | 2 | 1 | 5 | 7 | 13 | −6 | 7 | Advance to Third Phase of Reválida Stage |
| 9 | Altos Hornos Zapla | 8 | 1 | 1 | 6 | 5 | 9 | −4 | 4 | Advance to Third Phase of Reválida Stage |

Source: AFA
Rules for classification: 1) points; 2) head-to-head points; 3) goal difference; 4) goal scored; 5) away goals scored; 6) draw of lots.

===== Results =====
| Home \ Away | AHZ | CFE | GYT | JUA | MIT | SAR | SPP | UVK | UAC |
|---|---|---|---|---|---|---|---|---|---|
| Altos Hornos Zapla | | 0–1 | | 0–1 | 0–1 | | 5–1 | | |
| Chaco For Ever | | | 0–2 | 3–0 | 1–3 | | 0–1 | | |
| Gimnasia y Tiro | 3–0 | | | | | 2–2 | | 2–1 | 2–1 |
| Juventud Antoniana | | | 0–1 | | | | 0–1 | 0–1 | 1–0 |
| Mitre (SdE) | | | 0–2 | 2–1 | | | 1–1 | | 2–1 |
| Sarmiento (R) | 1–0 | 1–1 | | 0–0 | 0–3 | | | | |
| Sportivo Patria | | | 3–1 | | | 1–3 | | 1–1 | 2–0 |
| Unión (VK) | 0–0 | 1–0 | | | 2–0 | 1–1 | | | |
| Unión Aconquija | 1–0 | 5–1 | | | | 1–2 | | 1–0 | |

Updated to match(es) played on unknown. Source: AFA
Legend: Blue = home team win; Yellow = draw; Red = away team win.

==== Zone B ====
| Pos | Team | Pld | W | D | L | GF | GA | GD | Pts | Qualification |
|---|---|---|---|---|---|---|---|---|---|---|
| 1 | Unión (S) (Note: The match between Unión (S) and Gimnasia y Esgrima (M) in the round 6 of the Second Stage of the Championship Stage was awarded to Gimnasia y Esgrima (M) a 3–0 win as a result of Unión (S) supporters making incidents in the game. The original result was 2–3.) (Note: The match between Unión (S) and Gimnasia y Esgrima (M) in the round 6 of the Second Stage of the Championship Stage was awarded to Gimnasia y Esgrima (M) a 3–0 win as a result of Unión (S) supporters making incidents in the game. The original result was 2–3.) | 8 | 5 | 2 | 1 | 15 | 10 | +5 | 17 | Advance to Third Stage |
| 2 | Gimnasia y Esgrima (M) | 8 | 5 | 0 | 3 | 15 | 8 | +7 | 15 | Advance to Third Stage |
| 3 | Agropecuario Argentino | 8 | 4 | 3 | 1 | 10 | 9 | +1 | 15 | Advance to Third Stage |
| 4 | Defensores de Belgrano (VR) | 8 | 4 | 2 | 2 | 11 | 7 | +4 | 14 | Advance to Third Phase of Reválida Stage |
| 5 | Villa Mitre | 8 | 2 | 5 | 1 | 7 | 5 | +2 | 11 | Advance to Third Phase of Reválida Stage |
| 6 | Cipolletti | 8 | 3 | 1 | 4 | 7 | 8 | −1 | 10 | Advance to Third Phase of Reválida Stage |
| 7 | Deportivo Madryn | 8 | 1 | 4 | 3 | 6 | 11 | −5 | 7 | Advance to Third Phase of Reválida Stage |
| 8 | Sportivo Las Parejas | 8 | 1 | 2 | 5 | 5 | 14 | −9 | 5 | Advance to Third Phase of Reválida Stage |
| 9 | Alvarado | 8 | 1 | 1 | 6 | 7 | 11 | −4 | 4 | Advance to Third Phase of Reválida Stage |

Source: AFA
Rules for classification: 1) points; 2) head-to-head points; 3) goal difference; 4) goal scored; 5) away goals scored; 6) draw of lots.

===== Results =====
| Home \ Away | AGA | ALV | CIP | DEF | DMA | GEM | SLP | UNS | VMI |
|---|---|---|---|---|---|---|---|---|---|
| Agropecuario Argentino | | 3–2 | 1–0 | | | | 2–1 | 1–1 | |
| Alvarado | | | 0–2 | | 0–0 | | 3–0 | 1–2 | |
| Cipolletti | | | | | 2–1 | 1–0 | 0–1 | | 1–1 |
| Defensores de Belgrano (VR) | 3–0 | 1–0 | 1–0 | | | | | 1–3 | |
| Deportivo Madryn | 1–1 | | | 0–3 | | 2–1 | | | 0–0 |
| Gimnasia y Esgrima (M) | 1–2 | 2–1 | | 3–1 | | | | | 2–0 |
| Sportivo Las Parejas | | | | 1–1 | 1–1 | 1–3 | | | 0–3 |
| Unión (S) | | | 3–1 | | 3–1 | 0–3 | 1–0 | | |
| Villa Mitre | 0–0 | 1–0 | | 0–0 | | | | 2–2 | |

Updated to match(es) played on unknown. Source: AFA
Legend: Blue = home team win; Yellow = draw; Red = away team win.

==== Ranking of third-placed teams ====
| Pos | Team | Pld | W | D | L | GF | GA | GD | Pts | Qualification |
|---|---|---|---|---|---|---|---|---|---|---|
| 1 | Agropecuario Argentino | 8 | 4 | 3 | 1 | 10 | 9 | +1 | 15 | Advance to Third Stage |
| 2 | Sportivo Patria | 8 | 4 | 2 | 2 | 11 | 11 | 0 | 14 | |

Rules for classification: 1) points; 2) goal difference; 3) goal scored; 4) away goals scored; 5) draw of lots.

=== Third stage ===
| Pos | Team | Pld | W | D | L | GF | GA | GD | Pts | Qualification |
|---|---|---|---|---|---|---|---|---|---|---|
| 1 | Agropecuario Argentino (C, P) | 4 | 3 | 1 | 0 | 7 | 2 | +5 | 10 | Promoted to Primera B Nacional |
| 2 | Gimnasia y Esgrima (M) | 4 | 2 | 1 | 1 | 6 | 3 | +3 | 7 | Advance to Fifth Phase of Reválida Stage |
| 3 | Mitre (SdE) | 4 | 1 | 1 | 2 | 6 | 7 | −1 | 4 | Advance to Fifth Phase of Reválida Stage |
| 4 | Gimnasia y Tiro | 4 | 1 | 1 | 2 | 5 | 8 | −3 | 4 | Advance to Fifth Phase of Reválida Stage |
| 5 | Unión (S) | 4 | 0 | 2 | 2 | 4 | 8 | −4 | 2 | Advance to Fifth Phase of Reválida Stage |

Source: AFA
Rules for classification: 1) points; 2) head-to-head points; 3) goal difference; 4 goal scored; 5) away goals scored; 6) draw of lots.
(C) Champions; (P) Promoted

==== Results ====
| Home \ Away | GYT | MIT | UNS | GEM | AGA |
|---|---|---|---|---|---|
| Gimnasia y Tiro | | | 3–3 | 1–0 | |
| Mitre (SdE) | 3–1 | | | 2–3 | |
| Unión (S) | | 0–0 | | | 1–2 |
| Gimnasia y Esgrima (M) | | | 3–0 | | 0–0 |
| Agropecuario Argentino | 2–0 | 3–1 | | | |

Updated to match(es) played on unknown. Source: AFA
Legend: Blue = home team win; Yellow = draw; Red = away team win.

== Reválida stage ==
=== First phase ===
==== Zone A ====
| Pos | Team | Pld | W | D | L | GF | GA | GD | Pts | Qualification |
|---|---|---|---|---|---|---|---|---|---|---|
| 1 | Deportivo Maipú | 10 | 5 | 2 | 3 | 10 | 8 | +2 | 17 | Advance to Second Phase of Reválida Stage |
| 2 | Rivadavia (L) | 10 | 5 | 1 | 4 | 11 | 9 | +2 | 16 | Advance to Second Phase of Reválida Stage |
| 3 | Independiente (N) | 10 | 4 | 4 | 2 | 9 | 7 | +2 | 16 | |
| 4 | Deportivo Roca | 10 | 4 | 1 | 5 | 11 | 11 | 0 | 13 | |
| 5 | General Belgrano | 10 | 2 | 4 | 4 | 12 | 13 | −1 | 10 | |
| 6 | Ferro Carril Oeste (GP) | 10 | 2 | 4 | 4 | 10 | 15 | −5 | 10 | |

Source: AFA
Rules for classification: 1) points; 2) head-to-head points; 3) goal difference; 4) goal scored; 5) away goals scored; 6) draw of lots.

===== Results =====
| Home \ Away | DEM | DRO | FCO | GBE | INE | RIV |
|---|---|---|---|---|---|---|
| Deportivo Maipú | | 1–0 | 1–2 | 2–1 | 0–1 | 1–0 |
| Deportivo Roca | 1–3 | | 3–1 | 3–0 | 0–0 | 1–0 |
| Ferro Carril Oeste (GP) | 1–2 | 2–1 | | 1–1 | 1–1 | 0–2 |
| General Belgrano | 0–0 | 2–0 | 1–1 | | 0–1 | 5–1 |
| Independiente (N) | 2–0 | 0–1 | 1–1 | 2–2 | | 1–0 |
| Rivadavia (L) | 0–0 | 2–1 | 2–0 | 2–0 | 2–0 | |

Updated to match(es) played on unknown. Source: AFA
Legend: Blue = home team win; Yellow = draw; Red = away team win.

==== Zone B ====
| Pos | Team | Pld | W | D | L | GF | GA | GD | Pts | Qualification |
|---|---|---|---|---|---|---|---|---|---|---|
| 1 | Gutiérrez SC | 10 | 4 | 4 | 2 | 14 | 15 | −1 | 16 | Advance to Third Phase of Reválida Stage |
| 2 | San Lorenzo (A) | 10 | 4 | 3 | 3 | 14 | 9 | +5 | 15 | Advance to Third Phase of Reválida Stage |
| 3 | Juventud Unida Universitario | 10 | 3 | 5 | 2 | 11 | 13 | −2 | 14 | |
| 4 | San Jorge (T) | 10 | 3 | 4 | 3 | 13 | 9 | +4 | 13 | |
| 5 | Desamparados | 10 | 2 | 5 | 3 | 10 | 12 | −2 | 11 | |
| 6 | Concepción FC | 10 | 1 | 5 | 4 | 11 | 15 | −4 | 8 | |

Source: AFA
Rules for classification: 1) points; 2) head-to-head points; 3) goal difference; 4) goal scored; 5) away goals scored; 6) draw of lots.

===== Results =====
| Home \ Away | CFC | DES | GSC | JUU | SJT | SLA |
|---|---|---|---|---|---|---|
| Concepción FC | | 1–1 | 1–1 | 1–2 | 2–3 | 0–2 |
| Desamparados | 1–3 | | 2–2 | 1–2 | 2–1 | 1–0 |
| Gutiérrez SC | 2–2 | 3–2 | | 0–1 | 1–0 | 2–1 |
| Juventud Unida Universitario | 0–0 | 0–0 | 1–1 | | 2–2 | 2–2 |
| San Jorge (T) | 0–0 | 0–0 | 4–0 | 3–0 | | 0–2 |
| San Lorenzo (A) | 3–1 | 0–0 | 1–2 | 3–1 | 0–0 | |

Updated to match(es) played on unknown. Source: AFA
Legend: Blue = home team win; Yellow = draw; Red = away team win.

==== Zone C ====
| Pos | Team | Pld | W | D | L | GF | GA | GD | Pts | Qualification |
|---|---|---|---|---|---|---|---|---|---|---|
| 1 | Sportivo Belgrano | 10 | 4 | 4 | 2 | 16 | 15 | +1 | 16 | Advance to Third Phase of Reválida Stage |
| 2 | Guaraní Antonio Franco | 10 | 3 | 5 | 2 | 15 | 15 | 0 | 14 | Advance to Third Phase of Reválida Stage |
| 3 | Libertad (S) | 10 | 3 | 4 | 3 | 12 | 10 | +2 | 13 | |
| 4 | Defensores (P) (Note: The match between Defensores (P) and Sol de América (F) in the round 2 of the First Stage of the Revalida was awarded to Sol de América (F) a 2–0 win as a result of Defensores (P) fielding an ineligible player. The original result was 2–2.) (Note: The match between Defensores (P) and Sol de América (F) in the round 2 of the First Stage of the Revalida was awarded to Sol de América (F) a 2–0 win as a result of Defensores (P) fielding an ineligible player. The original result was 2-2.) | 10 | 3 | 3 | 4 | 12 | 12 | 0 | 12 | |
| 5 | Sol de América (F) | 10 | 3 | 3 | 4 | 11 | 13 | −2 | 12 | |
| 6 | Gimnasia y Esgrima (CdU) | 10 | 2 | 5 | 3 | 17 | 18 | −1 | 11 | |

Source: AFA
Rules for classification: 1) points; 2) head-to-head points; 3) goal difference; 4) goal scored; 5) away goals scored; 6) draw of lots.

===== Results =====
| Home \ Away | DPR | GYE | GAF | LIB | SOL | SPB |
|---|---|---|---|---|---|---|
| Defensores (P) | | 3–1 | 3–0 | 1–1 | 0–2 | 4–1 |
| Gimnasia y Esgrima (CdU) | 1–1 | | 1–1 | 1–1 | 5–0 | 1–1 |
| Guaraní Antonio Franco | 1–0 | 4–4 | | 2–0 | 2–1 | 3–3 |
| Libertad (S) | 2–0 | 3–0 | 1–1 | | 0–2 | 1–2 |
| Sol de América (F) | 0–0 | 3–0 | 0–0 | 1–3 | | 1–1 |
| Sportivo Belgrano | 3–0 | 1–3 | 2–1 | 0–0 | 2–1 | |

Updated to match(es) played on unknown. Source: AFA
Legend: Blue = home team win; Yellow = draw; Red = away team win.

=== Second to seventh phase ===
| Pos | Team | Pld | W | D | L | GF | GA | GD | Pts | Qualification |
|---|---|---|---|---|---|---|---|---|---|---|
| 1 | Defensores de Belgrano (VR) | 8 | 4 | 2 | 2 | 11 | 7 | +4 | 14 | Qualified from Second Stage |
| 2 | Sportivo Patria | 8 | 4 | 2 | 2 | 11 | 11 | 0 | 14 | Qualified from Second Stage |
| 3 | Sarmiento (R) | 8 | 3 | 4 | 1 | 10 | 9 | +1 | 13 | Qualified from Second Stage |
| 4 | Unión (VK) | 8 | 3 | 3 | 2 | 7 | 5 | +2 | 12 | Qualified from Second Stage |
| 5 | Villa Mitre | 8 | 2 | 5 | 1 | 7 | 5 | +2 | 11 | Qualified from Second Stage |
| 6 | Cipolletti | 8 | 3 | 1 | 4 | 7 | 8 | −1 | 10 | Qualified from Second Stage |
| 7 | Unión Aconquija | 8 | 3 | 0 | 5 | 10 | 10 | 0 | 9 | Qualified from Second Stage |
| 8 | Deportivo Madryn | 8 | 1 | 4 | 3 | 6 | 11 | −5 | 7 | Qualified from Second Stage |
| 9 | Juventud Antoniana | 8 | 2 | 1 | 5 | 3 | 8 | −5 | 7 | Qualified from Second Stage |
| 10 | Chaco For Ever | 8 | 2 | 1 | 5 | 7 | 13 | −6 | 7 | Qualified from Second Stage |
| 11 | Sportivo Las Parejas | 8 | 1 | 2 | 5 | 5 | 14 | −9 | 5 | Qualified from Second Stage |
| 12 | Alvarado | 8 | 1 | 1 | 6 | 7 | 11 | −4 | 4 | Qualified from Second Stage |
| 13 | Altos Hornos Zapla | 8 | 1 | 1 | 6 | 5 | 9 | −4 | 4 | Qualified from Second Stage |
| 14 | Deportivo Maipú | 10 | 5 | 2 | 3 | 10 | 8 | +2 | 17 | Qualified from First Phase of Reválida Stage |
| 15 | Sportivo Belgrano | 10 | 4 | 4 | 2 | 16 | 15 | +1 | 16 | Qualified from First Phase of Reválida Stage |
| 16 | Gutiérrez SC | 10 | 4 | 4 | 2 | 14 | 15 | −1 | 16 | Qualified from First Phase of Reválida Stage |
| 17 | Rivadavia (L) | 10 | 5 | 1 | 4 | 11 | 9 | +2 | 16 | Qualified from First Phase of Reválida Stage |
| 18 | San Lorenzo (A) | 10 | 4 | 3 | 3 | 14 | 9 | +5 | 15 | Qualified from First Phase of Reválida Stage |
| 19 | Guaraní Antonio Franco | 10 | 3 | 5 | 2 | 15 | 15 | 0 | 14 | Qualified from First Phase of Reválida Stage |

Source: AFA

==== Second phase ====
| Team 1 | Agg. | Team 2 | 1st leg | 2nd leg |
|---|---|---|---|---|
| Deportivo Maipú | 2–3 | Guaraní Antonio Franco | 2–2 | 0–1 |
| Sportivo Belgrano | 3–1 | San Lorenzo (A) | 0–1 | 3–0 |
| Gutiérrez SC | 2–1 | Rivadavia (L) | 1–1 | 1–0 |

==== Third phase ====
| Team 1 | Agg. | Team 2 | 1st leg | 2nd leg |
|---|---|---|---|---|
| Defensores de Belgrano (VR) | 1–1 (4–3 p) | Guaraní Antonio Franco | 0–1 | 1–0 |
| Sportivo Patria | 2–3 | Gutiérrez SC | 0–2 | 2–1 |
| Sarmiento (R) | 2–2 (5–3 p) | Sportivo Belgrano | 1–1 | 1–1 |
| Unión (VK) | 2–2 (4–5 p) | Altos Hornos Zapla | 1–2 | 1–0 |
| Villa Mitre | 2–2 (4–2 p) | Alvarado | 2–0 | 0–2 |
| Cipolletti | 3–2 | Sportivo Las Parejas | 0–2 | 3–0 |
| Unión Aconquija | 0–1 | Chaco For Ever | 0–1 | 0–0 |
| Deportivo Madryn | 2–2 (2–3 p) | Juventud Antoniana | 2–2 | 0–0 |

==== Fourth phase ====
| Team 1 | Agg. | Team 2 | 1st leg | 2nd leg |
|---|---|---|---|---|
| Defensores de Belgrano (VR) | 2–2 (4–1 p) | Gutiérrez SC | 1–2 | 1–0 |
| Sarmiento (R) | 2–0 | Altos Hornos Zapla | 0–0 | 2–0 |
| Villa Mitre | 3–2 | Chaco For Ever | 1–2 | 2–0 |
| Cipolletti | 1–1 (3–1 p) | Juventud Antoniana | 1–1 | 0–0 |

==== Fifth phase ====
| Team 1 | Agg. | Team 2 | 1st leg | 2nd leg |
|---|---|---|---|---|
| Gimnasia y Tiro | 2–2 (0–3 p) | Cipolletti | 0–1 | 2–1 |
| Gimnasia y Esgrima (M) | 2–1 | Villa Mitre | 0–1 | 2–0 |
| Mitre (SdE) | 2–1 | Sarmiento (R) | 1–1 | 1–0 |
| Unión (S) | 2–4 | Defensores de Belgrano (VR) | 1–2 | 1–2 |

==== Sixth phase ====
| Team 1 | Agg. | Team 2 | 1st leg | 2nd leg |
|---|---|---|---|---|
| Gimnasia y Esgrima (M) | 2–2 (4–3 p) | Cipolletti | 1–1 | 1–1 |
| Mitre (SdE) | 3–0 | Defensores de Belgrano (VR) | 2–0 | 1–0 |

==== Seventh phase ====
| Team 1 | Agg. | Team 2 | 1st leg | 2nd leg |
|---|---|---|---|---|
| Gimnasia y Esgrima (M) | 3–3 (3–4 p) | Mitre (SdE) | 0–1 | 3–2 |

== Relegation ==
=== Zone A ===
| Pos | Team | First Stage Pts | Reválida Stage Pts | Total Pts | Total Pld | Avg | Relegation |
|---|---|---|---|---|---|---|---|
| 1 | Deportivo Maipú | 20 | 17 | 37 | 26 | 1.423 | |
| 2 | Ferro Carril Oeste (GP) | 29 | 10 | 39 | 30 | 1.3 | |
| 3 | Rivadavia (L) | 22 | 16 | 38 | 30 | 1.267 | |
| 4 | Deportivo Roca | 19 | 13 | 32 | 26 | 1.231 | |
| 5 | Independiente (N) | 12 | 16 | 28 | 26 | 1.077 | |
| 6 | General Belgrano (R) | 15 | 10 | 25 | 30 | 0.833 | Torneo Federal B |

=== Zone B ===
| Pos | Team | First Stage Pts | Reválida Stage Pts | Total Pts | Total Pld | Avg | Relegation |
|---|---|---|---|---|---|---|---|
| 1 | San Lorenzo (A) | 19 | 15 | 34 | 26 | 1.308 | |
| 2 | Juventud Unida Universitario | 20 | 14 | 34 | 26 | 1.308 | |
| 3 | Gutiérrez SC | 16 | 16 | 32 | 26 | 1.231 | |
| 4 | San Jorge (T) | 15 | 13 | 28 | 26 | 1.077 | |
| 5 | Desamparados | 16 | 11 | 27 | 26 | 1.038 | |
| 6 | Concepción FC (R) | 16 | 8 | 24 | 26 | 0.923 | Torneo Federal B |

=== Zone C ===
| Pos | Team | First Stage Pts | Reválida Stage Pts | Total Pts | Total Pld | Avg | Relegation |
|---|---|---|---|---|---|---|---|
| 1 | Sportivo Belgrano | 19 | 16 | 35 | 26 | 1.346 | |
| 2 | Gimnasia y Esgrima (CdU) | 22 | 11 | 33 | 26 | 1.269 | |
| 3 | Libertad (S) | 18 | 13 | 31 | 26 | 1.192 | |
| 4 | Defensores (P) | 18 | 12 | 30 | 26 | 1.154 | |
| 5 | Guaraní Antonio Franco | 14 | 14 | 28 | 26 | 1.077 | |
| 6 | Sol de América (F) (R) | 15 | 12 | 27 | 26 | 1.038 | Torneo Federal B |

== Season statistics ==
=== Top scorers ===
| Rank | Player | Club | Goals |
|---|---|---|---|
| 1 | (Paraguay) Pablo Palacios Alvarenga | Gimnasia y Esgrima (M) | 21 |
| 2 | (Argentina) Juan Amieva | Gimnasia y Tiro | 17 |
| 3 | (Argentina) Federico Almerares | Ferro Carril Oeste (GP) | 14 |
| 3 | (Argentina) Gonzalo Sosa | Gimnasia y Esgrima (CdU) | 14 |
| 3 | (Argentina) Esteban Ciaccheri | Rivadavia (L) | 14 |
| 3 | (Argentina) Julio Cáceres | Sarmiento (R) | 14 |

== See also ==
- 2016–17 Primera B Nacional
- 2016–17 Copa Argentina
