= Club Agropecuario Argentino =

Argentine football club

Agropecuario
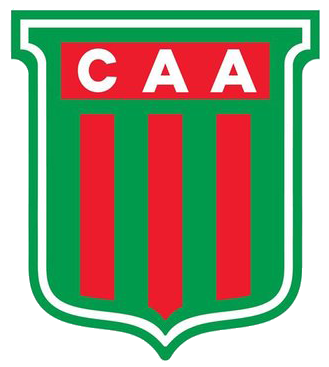
- Full name: Club Agropecuario Argentino
- Nicknames: Sojero; Agro
- Founded: August 23, 2011; 14 years ago
- Ground: Ofelia Rosenzuaig, Carlos Casares, Buenos Aires
- Capacity: 8,000
- Coordinates: 70°55′19″N 8°42′54″W
- Chairman: Bernardo Grobocopatel
- Manager: Adrián Adrover
- League: Primera Nacional
- 2025: Primera Nacional Zone B, 7th of 18
Home colours	Away colours

Club Agropecuario Argentino is an Argentine football club sited in Carlos Casares, a city of Buenos Aires Province. Founded in 2011, the club is one of the youngest institutions affiliated to the Argentine Football Association.

The club currently plays in Primera Nacional, the second division of the Argentine football league system.

== History ==
Agropecuario was founded by Bernardo Grobocopatel, a local entrepreneur related to soybean cultivation, who is also owner and president of the club.

The squad participated in now defunct Argentino A where was eliminated by C.A. French in the 2012 season. The next year, Agropecuario finished 6th out of 6 teams in the Argentino B. The club debuted in the Federal B (the regionalised 4th division) in 2014, where it was defeated by Juventud de Pergamino and eliminated from the competition.

Agropecuario promoted to Federal A in 2016 after beating San Martín de Formosa by penalty shoot-out.

The team lasted only one season in the division so in June 2017, Agropecuario crowned 2016–17 champion, therefore promoting to Primera B Nacional, the second division of Argentine football, after Gimnasia y Tiro defeated Gimnasia y Esgrima (M) by 1–0. Agropecuario also became the youngest club to achieve a promotion to B Nacional, with only 6 years of existence. Until then, Crucero del Norte had held the record with 9-yr old when it promoted in 2012. (Note: Although La Nación stated that Crucero del Norte had been founded in 1989, the club itself set its date of foundation on June 28, 2003.)

== Players ==
=== Current squad ===
As of 6 March 2026 Note: Flags indicate national team as defined under FIFA eligibility rules; some limited exceptions apply. Players may hold more than one non-FIFA nationality.

No.	Pos.	Nation	Player
1	GK	ARG	Luciano Acosta
2	DF	ARG	Jorge Cabello
3	DF	ARG	Tomás Lecanda (on loan from Tigre)
4	DF	ARG	Facundo Sánchez
5	MF	ARG	Rodrigo Castro
6	DF	ARG	Alan Aguirre
7	FW	ARG	Brian Blando
8	MF	ARG	Jorge Valdez Chamorro
9	FW	ARG	Carlos Auzqui
10	DF	ARG	Milton Ramos
11	MF	ARG	Martín Corda
12	GK	ARG	Germán Salort
13	DF	ARG	Danilo Actis

No.	Pos.	Nation	Player
14	DF	ARG	Enzo Aguirre
15	DF	ARG	Federico Pérez (on loan from Comunicaciones)
16	MF	ARG	Antonio Napolitano
17	MF	ARG	Braian Aranda
18	MF	ARG	Braian Rojas
19	MF	ARG	Santiago Gallucci
20	FW	ARG	Lorenzo Barrera
21	FW	ARG	Danilo Ruiz Díaz
22	FW	ARG	Rodrigo Mosqueira
24	MF	ARG	Damián Lemos (captain)
28	FW	ARG	Alejandro Gagliardi
30	FW	ARG	Diego Vásquez
38	DF	ARG	Matías Molina

=== Reserve squad ===
Note: Flags indicate national team as defined under FIFA eligibility rules; some limited exceptions apply. Players may hold more than one non-FIFA nationality.

No.	Pos.	Nation	Player
—	GK	ARG	Alejo Medina
—	DF	ARG	Jerónimo Álvarez

== Titles ==
=== National ===
- Torneo Federal A (1): 2016-17

=== Regional ===
- Liga Casarense de fútbol (4): 2012, 2014, 2015, 2019
