= 2014–15 Copa Argentina =

Tournament details
- Country: Argentina
- Teams: 270

Final positions
- Champions: Boca Juniors
- Runners-up: Rosario Central
- 2016 Copa Libertadores: Rosario Central

Tournament statistics
- Matches played: 265
- Goals scored: 610 (2.3 per match)
- Top goal scorer(s): Luis Luna (5 goals)

The 2014–15 Copa Argentina was the sixth edition of the Copa Argentina, and the fourth since the relaunch of the tournament in 2011. The competition began on October 15, 2014. Defending champions Huracán were eliminated by Independiente Rivadavia in the Round of 64. In the final, Boca Juniors won the tournament beating Rosario Central to win their third title. By winning the competition, Boca Juniors won the right to play the 2015 Supercopa Argentina, and Rosario Central, as runner-up won the right to play in the 2016 Copa Libertadores because Boca Juniors had already qualified as Primera División champion. Luis Lune, from Vélez Sársfield (SR), was the highest scorer with 5 goals.

== Teams ==
Two hundred and seventy teams took part in this competition. All the teams from the Primera División (20), Primera B Nacional (22), Primera B Metropolitana (22), Federal A (40), Primera C (20), Federal B (128), and Primera D (18).

=== First Level ===
==== Primera División ====
- Arsenal
- Atlético de Rafaela
- Banfield
- Belgrano
- Boca Juniors
- Defensa y Justicia
- Estudiantes (LP)
- Gimnasia y Esgrima (LP)
- Godoy Cruz
- Independiente
- Lanús
- Newell's Old Boys
- Olimpo
- Quilmes
- Racing
- River Plate
- Rosario Central
- San Lorenzo
- Tigre
- Vélez Sársfield

=== Second Level ===
==== Primera B Nacional ====
- Aldosivi
- All Boys
- Argentinos Juniors
- Atlético Tucumán
- Boca Unidos
- Colón
- Crucero del Norte
- Douglas Haig
- Ferro Carril Oeste
- Gimnasia y Esgrima (J)
- Guaraní Antonio Franco
- Huracán (defending champions)
- Independiente Rivadavia
- Instituto
- Nueva Chicago
- Patronato
- Ramon Santamarina
- San Martín (SJ)
- Sarmiento (J)
- Sportivo Belgrano
- Temperley
- Unión

=== Third Level ===
==== Primera B Metropolitana ====
- Acassuso
- Almagro
- Almirante Brown
- Atlanta
- Barracas Central
- Brown
- Chacarita Juniors
- Colegiales
- Comunicaciones
- Deportivo Armenio
- Deportivo Español
- Deportivo Merlo
- Deportivo Morón
- Estudiantes (BA)
- Fénix
- Los Andes
- Platense
- Sportivo Italiano
- Tristán Suárez
- UAI Urquiza
- Villa Dálmine
- Villa San Carlos

==== Torneo Federal A ====
- Alianza de Cutral Có
- Altos Hornos Zapla
- Alvarado (MdP)
- Américo Tesorieri (LR)
- Andino (La Rioja)
- Atlético Paraná
- CAI
- Chaco For Ever
- Central Córdoba (SdE)
- Cipolletti
- Defensores de Belgrano (VR)
- Deportivo Madryn
- Deportivo Maipú
- Deportivo Roca
- Ferro Carril Oeste (GP)
- General Belgrano
- Gimnasia y Esgrima (CdU)
- Gimnasia y Esgrima (Mza)
- Gimnasia y Tiro (S)
- Guillermo Brown
- Independiente (C)
- Independiente (N)
- Juventud Antoniana (S)
- Juventud Unida (G)
- Juventud Unida Universitario
- Libertad (S)
- Mitre (SdE)
- San Jorge (T)
- San Lorenzo de Alem
- San Martín (T)
- Sarmiento (R)
- Sol de América (F)
- Sportivo Estudiantes (SL)
- Sportivo Patria (F)
- Talleres (C)
- Textil Mandiyú (C)
- Tiro Federal (R)
- Unión Aconquija
- Unión (MdP)
- Unión (VK)

=== Fourth Level ===
==== Primera C Metropolitana ====
- Argentino (M)
- Argentino (Q)
- Berazategui
- Central Córdoba (R)
- Defensores de Belgrano
- Defensores de Cambaceres
- Defensores Unidos
- Deportivo Riestra
- Laferrere
- Dock Sud
- Excursionistas
- Ferrocarril Midland
- Flandria
- General Lamadrid
- J. J. de Urquiza
- Juventud Unida (SM)
- Luján
- Sacachispas
- San Telmo
- Talleres (RdE)

==== Torneo Federal B ====
- 9 de Julio (M)
- 9 de Julio (R)
- 25 de Mayo (LP)
- Alianza de Moldes
- Almirante Brown (L)
- Alumni (VM)
- Atlético Amalia
- América (GP)
- Agropecuario Argentino
- Aprendices Casildenses
- Argentino Peñarol
- Argentinos (VdM)
- Atenas de Pocito
- Atenas (RC)
- Atlético Argentino (M)
- Atlético Camioneros
- Atlético Chicoana
- Atlético Concepción
- Atlético Palmira
- Atlético Pellegrini
- Atlético Policial
- Atlético Regina
- Bella Vista (BB)
- Bella Vista (T)
- Belgrano (E)
- Belgrano (P)
- Ben Hur
- Boxing Club
- Bragado Club
- Camioneros Argentinos del Norte
- Central Norte (S)
- Colegiales (C)
- Colón Juniors
- Comercio (SS)
- Comercio Central Unidos
- Concepción FC
- Cruz del Sur
- Defensores (Pronunciamiento)
- Defensores de Salto
- Defensores (VdM)
- Deportivo Achirense
- Deportivo Aguilares
- Deportivo Fontana
- Deportivo Guaymallén
- Deportivo Lastenia
- Deportivo Tabacal
- Desamparados (SJ)
- El Linqueño
- Empleados de Comercio
- Estudiantes (RC)
- Everton
- Ex Alumnos Escuela N°185
- Ferrocarril Roca (LF)
- Ferro (O)
- Ferroviario (C)
- General Paz Juniors
- General Rojo
- Germinal
- Güemes (SdE)
- Gutiérrez
- Herminio Arrieta
- Huracán (G)
- Huracán (SR)
- Huracán Las Heras
- Independiente (Fe)
- Independiente (Fo)
- Independiente (HY)
- Independiente (RC)
- Independiente de Villa Obrera
- Instituto Santiago
- Jorge Gibson Brown
- Jorge Newbery (J)
- Jorge Newbery (VM)
- Juventud (P)
- Juventud Alianza
- Juventud Unida (C)
- Kimberley
- La Emilia
- Las Palmas
- La Salle Jobson
- Libertad (C)
- Liniers (BB)
- Luján SC
- Maronese
- Mitre (S)
- Monterrico San Vicente
- Ocampo Fábrica
- Once Tigres
- Pacífico
- Petrolero Argentino
- Progreso (RdlF)
- Puerto General San Martín
- Racing (C)
- Racing (O)
- Resistencia Central
- Río Grande
- Rivadavia (L)
- San Carlos (LE)
- San Jorge (SF)
- San Martín (M)
- Sanjustino
- Sarmiento (A)
- Sarmiento (CS)
- Sarmiento (L)
- Sarmiento (LB)
- Social Obrero
- Sol de Mayo
- Sportivo (PRSP)
- Sportivo Atlético Ballofet
- Sportivo Baradero
- Sportivo Del Bono
- Sportivo Las Parejas
- Sportivo Peñarol (Ch)
- Sportivo Rivadavia (VT)
- Sportivo Tintina
- Sports de Salto
- Talleres (F)
- Talleres (P)
- Tiro Federal (BB)
- Tiro Federal (M)
- Tiro y Gimnasia
- Trinidad de San Juan
- Unión (S)
- Unión Santiago
- Vélez Sarsfield (SR)
- Viale Foot-Ball Club
- Villa Cubas (C)
- Villa Mitre

=== Fifth Level ===
==== Primera D Metropolitana ====
- Argentino (R)
- Atlas
- Atlético Lugano
- Cañuelas
- Central Ballester
- Centro Español
- Claypole
- Deportivo Muñiz
- El Porvenir
- Ituzaingó
- Leandro N. Alem
- Liniers
- Puerto Nuevo
- San Martín (B)
- San Miguel
- Sportivo Barracas
- Victoriano Arenas
- Yupanqui

== Regional Round ==
This round is organized by the Consejo Federal.

=== Group A:Federal A ===
==== Round I ====
In this first round, 40 teams from the Torneo Federal A and 4 teams from the Torneo Federal B participated. The round was played on October 22, in a single match knock-out format. The 22 winning teams advanced to the Round II.

22 October 2014	CAI	5–2	Cruz del Sur	Comodoro Rivadavia, Pcia. de Chubut
16:00	Loncón 14 ', 41 ', 49'; Aynol 19'; Molina 87'	Report	Arabarco 72'; Mansilla 79'	Stadium: Municipal de Comodoro Rivadavia; Referee: Darío Rojas Martínez

22 October 2014	Guillermo Brown	0–0 (3–0 p)	Deportivo Madryn	Puerto Madryn, Pcia. de Chubut
15:00		Report		Stadium: Raúl Conti; Referee: Fernando Espinoza

Cipolletti		Deportivo Roca
	Report

22 October 2014	Alianza (CC)	1–1 (2–4 p)	Independiente (N)	Cutral Có, Pcia. de Neuquén
21:00	Cisneros 76'	Report	Bevacqua 89'	Stadium: Coloso del Ruca; Referee: Eliseo Acosta

22 October 2014	Sportivo Estudiantes (SL)	0–3	Juventud Unida Universitario	La Punta, Pcia. de San Luis
18:00		Report	Agudiak 9'; Fernández 68'; Giménez 90'	Stadium: Provincial Juan Gilberto Funes; Referee: Alejandro Arco

22 October 2014	General Belgrano	1–0	Ferro (GP)	Santa Rosa, Pcia. de La Pampa
21:00	Germi 28'	Report		Stadium: Nuevo Rancho Grande; Referee: Mario Ejarque

22 October 2014	Unión (MdP)	1–0	Alvarado	Mar del Plata, Pcia. de Buenos Aires
19:00	Ramírez 14'	Report		Stadium: José María Minella; Referee: Facundo Tello

22 October 2014	Defensores de Belgrano (VR)	1–0	Independiente (C)	Villa Ramallo, Pcia. de Buenos Aires
21:00	Castro 15'	Report		Stadium: Salomón Boeseldín; Referee: Sergio Testa

22 October 2014	Unión (VK)	1–3	Alianza de Moldes	San Juan, Pcia. de San Juan
21:30	Pereira 78'	Report	Mugnaini 35'; Prado 47'; López 84'	Stadium: San Juan del Bicentenario; Referee: Esteban Jofré

22 October 2014	Deportivo Maipú	1–1 (4–2 p)	Gimnasia y Esgrima (Mza)	Maipú, Pcia. de Mendoza
21:15	Murcia 55'	Report	Taborda 39'	Stadium: Omar Higinio Sperdutti; Referee: Bruno Bocca

22 October 2014	Talleres (C)	2–2 (4–5 p)	Alumni (VM)	Córdoba, Pcia. de Córdoba
21:00	Martínez 52'; Barrionuevo 55'	Report	Bolzicco 18'; Godoy 75'	Stadium: Mario Alberto Kempes; Referee: Adrián Franklin

22 October 2014	Libertad (S)	0–0 (1–3 p)	Tiro Federal (R)	Sunchales, Pcia. de Santa Fe
18:30		Report		Stadium: Hogar de Los Tigres; Referee: José Sandoval

22 October 2014	Chaco For Ever	2–1	Sarmiento (R)	Resistencia, Pcia. de Chaco
21:00	Weissen 36'; Barlesi 81'	Report	Brizuela 90+2'	Stadium: Juan Alberto García; Referee: Sebastián Mastrángelo

22 October 2014	Sol de América (F)	3–3 (4–3 p)	Sportivo Patria	Formosa, Pcia. de Formosa
20:15	Magno 55 ', 68'; Brítez 79'	Report	Antonelli 33'; Azcurra 48'; Romero 67'	Stadium: Antonio Romero; Referee: David Ranciglio

22 October 2014	Atlético Paraná	1–0	Textil Mandiyú	Paraná, Pcia. de Entre Rios
17:00	Chitero 88'	Report		Stadium: Pedro Mutio; Referee: Francisco Acosta

22 October 2014	Juventud Unida (G)	1–1 (3–4 p)	Gimnasia y Esgrima (CdU)	Gualeguaychú, Pcia. de Entre Rios
14:00	Canario 81'	Report	Monje 41'	Stadium: De Los Eucaliptos; Referee: Pablo Echavarría

22 October 2014	San Martín (T)	3–0	San Jorge (T)	San Miguel de Tucumán, Pcia. de Tucumán
21:30	Rodríguez 51'; Silva 54'; Chacana 85'	Report		Stadium: La Ciudadela; Referee: Luis Lobo Medina

22 October 2014	Central Córdoba (SdE)	0–2	Mitre (SdE)	Santiago del Estero, Pcia. de Santiago del Estero
22:00		Report	Parisi 48'; Martínez Ramos 51'	Stadium: Alfredo Terrera; Referee: Federico Guaymas Tornero

22 October 2014	San Lorenzo de Alem	1–2	Unión Aconquija	San Fernando del Valle de Catamarca, Pcia. de Catamarca
21:45	Lizárraga 89'	Report	Sacayán 18'; Paz 82'	Stadium: Bicentenario Ciudad de Catamarca; Referee: Gustavo Fabián

22 October 2014	Américo Tesorieri	1–2	Andino (LR)	La Rioja, Pcia. de La Rioja
21:45	Ceballos 10'	Report	Oros 29'; Fuentes 41'	Stadium: Carlos Mercado Luna; Referee: Gabriel Chade

22 October 2014	Altos Hornos Zapla	2–1	Tiro y Gimnasia (J)	Palpalá, Pcia. de Jujuy
21:30	Aguirre 20 ', 87'	Report	Ruiz 52'	Stadium: Emilio Fabrizzi; Referee: José Vallejos

22 October 2014	Gimnasia y Tiro (S)	1–0	Juventud Antoniana	Salta, Pcia. de Salta
22:00	Villareal 37'	Report		Stadium: El Gigante del Norte; Referee: Carlos Boxler

==== Round II ====
In this round, 22 teams qualified from Round I participated. The round was played between November 5 and November 21, in a single knock-out match format. The 11 winning teams advanced to the Final Stage.

5 November 2014	Guillermo Brown	0–1	CAI	Puerto Madryn, Pcia. de Chubut
15:00		Report	Loncón 85'	Stadium: Raúl Conti; Referee: Sergio Testa

5 November 2014	Cipolletti	0–0 (2–4 p)	Independiente (N)	Cipolletti, Pcia. de Río Negro
21:00		Report		Stadium: La Visera de Cemento; Referee: Facundo Tello

5 November 2014	Juventud Unida Universitario	1–1 (4–3 p)	General Belgrano	San Luis, Pcia. de San Luis
	Reinoso 90' (pen.)	Report	Del Río 75' (pen.)	Stadium: Mario Sebastián Diez; Referee: Eduardo Jofré

21 November 2014	Unión (MdP)	0–0 (2–3 p)	Defensores de Belgrano (VR)	Mar del Plata, Pcia. de Buenos Aires
20:00		Report		Stadium: José María Minella; Referee: Lucas Novelli Sanz

5 November 2014	Deportivo Maipú	2–2 (3–5 p)	Alianza (CM)	Maipú, Pcia. de Mendoza
21:15	Piergüidi 29 ', 41'	Report	Mugnaini 77'; Ferraro 80'	Stadium: Omar Higinio Sperdutti; Referee: Mario Ejarque

5 November 2014	Alumni (VM)	4–2	Tiro Federal (R)	Villa María, Pcia. de Córdoba
21:00	Colombo 33 ', 60'; Besel 45+1 ', 51'	Report	Resler 53 ', 90'	Stadium: Plaza Manuel Anselmo Ocampo; Referee: Alejandro Arco

5 November 2014	Chaco For Ever	0–0 (3–5 p)	Sol de América (F)	Resistencia, Pcia. de Chaco
21:00		Report		Stadium: Juan Alberto García; Referee: Jorge Sosa

5 November 2014	Gimnasia y Esgrima (CdU)	0–0 (10–9 p)	Atlético Paraná	Concepción del Uruguay, Pcia. de Entre Ríos
21:15		Report		Stadium: Manuel y Ramón Núñez; Referee: David Ranciglio

6 November 2014	San Martín (T)	1–0	Mitre (SdE)	San Miguel de Tucumán, Pcia. de Tucumán
21:30	Silva 65'	Report		Stadium: La Ciudadela; Referee: Miguel Mazón

5 November 2014	Unión Aconquija	0–1	Andino (La Rioja)	Andalgalá, Pcia. de Catamarca
17:00		Report	Fuentes 17'	Stadium: Tiro Federal y Gimnasia de Andalgalá; Referee: Gustavo Fabián

5 November 2014	Gimnasia y Tiro	1–2	Altos Hornos Zapla	Salta, Pcia. de Salta
22:00	Zárate 10'	Report	Cartello 45+1'; Guaymás 82'	Stadium: El Gigante del Norte; Referee: Guillermo González

=== Group B:Federal B ===
==== Round I ====
In this first round, 72 teams from the Torneo Argentino B participated. The round was played between October 15 and October 22, in a single match knock-out format. The 36 winning teams advanced to the Round II.

15 October 2014	Maronese (N)	0–4	Petrolero Argentino	Neuquén, Pcia. de Neuquén
17:00		Report	Zúñiga 10'; Tascone 21'; Domínguez 67'; Gatica 78'	Stadium: Maronese; Referee: Javier Obreque

15 October 2014	Atlético Regina	0–3	25 de Mayo (LP)	Villa Regina, Pcia. de Río Negro
20:30		Report	Romero 45'; Nieto 54'; Cárdenas 75'	Stadium: Atlético Regina; Referee: José Higueras

16 October 2014	Villa Mitre (BB)	1–2	Liniers (BB)	Bahía Blanca, Pcia. de Buenos Aires
20:00	Arroyo 37'	Report	Bárez 23'; Acosta 55'	Stadium: El Fortín; Referee: Gustavo Altuna

15 October 2014	Bella Vista (BB)	1–4	Tiro Federal (BB)	Bahía Blanca, Pcia. de Buenos Aires
16:00	Gutiérrez 83'	Report	Pentcheff 30'; Martínez Miño 79'; Filippini 85'; Ceccani 87'	Stadium: Ignacio Nicolás; Referee: Lucas Nieto

15 October 2014	Rivadavia (L)	2–1	El Linqueño	Lincoln, Pcia. de Buenos Aires
13:30	Visser 28'; Colapietro 32'	Report	Del Potro 22'	Stadium: El Coliseo; Referee: Alejo Cid

15 October 2014	La Emilia	3–2	General Rojo	La Emilia, Pcia. de Buenos Aires
16:00	Pérez 8'; Fernández 32'; Rotondo 40'	Report	Bazán 45+1'; Gaeto 80'	Stadium: Jacinto López; Referee: Daniel Asenjo

15 October 2014	Sports (S)	1–1 (4–3 p)	Defensores de Salto	Salto, Pcia. de Buenos Aires
21:00	Gomez 76'	Report	Alessandro 24'	Stadium: Esteban Chiari; Referee: Gonzalo Ferrari

15 October 2014	Racing (O)	1–1 (4–2 p)	Ferro Carril Sud	Olavarría, Pcia. de Buenos Aires
21:00	Ordozgoiti 55'	Report	Leiva 70'	Stadium: José Buglione Matinese; Referee: Lucas Jara

16 October 2014	Unión (S)	0–0 (5–6 p)	9 de Julio (R)	Sunchales, Pcia. de Santa Fe
21:15		Report		Stadium: La Fortaleza; Referee: Roberto Franco

15 October 2014	Sanjustino	2–1	La Salle Jobson	San Justo, Pcia. de Santa Fe
21:30	Benítez 17'; Peralta 23'	Report	Bianco 6'	Stadium: Sanjustino; Referee: Patricio Quiroga

15 October 2014	Deportivo Achirense	1–1 (5–6 p)	Defensores (P)	Colón, Pcia. de Entre Ríos
21:00	Iturbe 44'	Report	Noguera 48'	Stadium: Guillermo Bonnín; Referee: Bruno Richard

15 October 2014	Deportivo Fontana	3–1	Resistencia Central	Resistencia, Pcia. de Chaco
16:00	González 77 ', 90+6'; Plutt 82'	Report	Romero 41'	Stadium: Juan Alberto García; Referee: Milton Van Lierde

15 October 2014	Central Norte	0–2	Atlético Pellegrini	Salta, Pcia. de Salta
22:00		Report	Romero 33' de Pauli 52'	Stadium: Dr. Luis Güemes; Referee: Gustavo Fabián

15 October 2014	Mitre (S)	0–0 (4–1 p)	Camioneros Argentinos del Norte	Salta, Pcia. de Salta
16:30		Report		Stadium: Miguel Pascual Soler; Referee: Juan Lagoria

15 October 2014	Herminio Arrieta	0–2	Tiro y Deportes Río Grande	Libertador General San Martín, Pcia. de Jujuy
16:30		Report	Manzur 50 ', 67'	Stadium: Monumental del Barrio Norte; Referee: Matías Sepúlveda

15 October 2014	Deportivo Tabacal	0–0 (6–7 p)	Independiente (HY)	Orán, Pcia. de Salta
20:00		Report		Stadium: El Tabacal; Referee: Gustavo Gerez

15 October 2014	Comercio Central Unidos	0–2	Vélez Sarsfield (SR)	Santiago del Estero, Pcia. de Santiago del Estero
17:00		Report	Luna 37 ', 69'	Stadium: Raúl Adolfo Seijas; Referee: Angel Argañaraz

15 October 2014	Güemes (SdE)	3–1	Sarmiento (SdE)	Santiago del Estero, Pcia. de Santiago del Estero
22:00	Rodriguez 26'; Salvatierra 51'; Gramajo 70'	Report	Ibañez 89'	Stadium: Arturo Miranda; Referee: Andrea Loto

15 October 2014	Independiente (Fe)	1–3	Instituto Santiago	Fernández, Pcia. de Santiago del Estero
16:00	Coria 55'	Report	Gauna 45 ', 59'; García Chamut 73'	Stadium: Independiente; Referee: Rodrigo Rivero

15 October 2014	Concepción FC	3–3 (7–6 p)	Atlético Amalia	Concepción, Pcia. de Tucumán
21:00	Albarracín 13'; Herrera 44'; Rodríguez 74'	Report	Torres 38'; Mateucci 47'; Toledo 78'	Stadium: Stewart Shipton; Referee: Nelson Bejas

15 October 2014	Atlético Policial (C)	3–0	Villa Cubas (C)	San Fernando del Valle de Catamarca, Pcia. de Catamarca
21:30	Vega 52 ', 89'; Valdivieso 90+3'	Report		Stadium: Bicentenario Ciudad de Catamarca; Referee: Claudio Orellana

15 October 2014	Deportivo Aguilares	1–0	Almirante Brown (L)	Aguilares, Pcia. de Tucumán
16:30	Mendoza 52'	Report		Stadium: Agustín Fernández; Referee: Sebastián Barrionuevo

15 October 2014	Bella Vista (T)	0–1	Deportivo Lastenia	Bella Vista, Pcia. de Tucumán
16:30		Report	Berta 67'	Stadium: De Las Palmeras; Referee: Facundo Nanterne

15 October 2014	Racing (C)	2–1	Las Palmas	Córdoba, Pcia. de Córdoba
21:30	Rami 35'; Sánchez 55'	Report	Chiatti 38'	Stadium: Miguel Sancho; Referee: Federico Cejas

22 October 2014	General Paz Juniors	0–0 (1–2 p)	Argentino Peñarol	Córdoba, Pcia. de Córdoba
21:00		Report		Stadium: General Paz Juniors; Referee: Julio Quinteros

22 October 2014	Tiro Federal (M)	1–1 (5–6 p)	9 de Julio (M)	Morteros, Pcia. de Córdoba
16:00	Foggia 7'	Report	Leichner 46'	Stadium: Bautista Monetti; Referee: Osvaldo Albarracín

16 October 2014	Atlético Trinidad	3–0	Atenas (P)	San Juan, Argentina, Pcia. de San Juan
21:00	Tejada 17'; Cabañas 69'; Britos 83'	Report		Stadium: El Templo; Referee: Osvaldo Preziosa

15 October 2014	Sportivo Del Bono	4–1	Colón Juniors	Rivadavia, Pcia. de San Juan
17:00	Giuliani 1'; Leichner 9 ', 45+1'; Castro 70'	Report	Aguero 83'	Stadium: Juan Baustista del Bono; Referee: Rubén Fernández

15 October 2014	Desamparados (SJ)	2–0	Sportivo Peñarol (Ch)	San Juan, Argentina, Pcia. de San Juan
21:30	Brun 37'; Amaya 74'	Report		Stadium: El Serpentario; Referee: Pablo Núñez

15 October 2014	Atlético Argentino	1–0	CEC (Mdza)	San José, Pcia. de Mendoza
16:00	Suraci 84'	Report		Stadium: Ingeniero Mauricio Serra; Referee: Matías Ferreira

15 October 2014	Deportivo Guaymallén	2–0	San Martín (M)	Guaymallén, Pcia. de Mendoza
21:30	Prieto 12'; Martini 34'	Report		Stadium: Hugo Pedro Alastra; Referee: Sebastián Márquez

15 October 2014	Luján SC (Mendoza)	0–0 (6–7 p)	Atlético Palmira	Luján de Cuyo, Pcia. de Mendoza
21:30		Report		Stadium: Jardín del Bajo; Referee: Mauricio Sosa

15 October 2014	Huracán (SR)	2–2 (3–2 p)	Sportivo Atlético Ballofet	San Rafael, Pcia. de Neuquén
21:45	Díaz 61'; Amieva 64'	Report	Buenamigo 46'; Massi 58'	Stadium: Pretel Hermanos; Referee: Carlos Salinas

15 October 2014	Estudiantes (RC)	3–1	Atenas (RC)	Río Cuarto, Pcia. de Córdoba
21:30	Peirone 10 ', 25'; Quiroga 45+1'	Report	Jaime 69' (o.g.)	Stadium: Ciudad de Río Cuarto; Referee: Matías Ramos

15 October 2014	Colegiales (C)	1–1 (5–4 p)	Libertad (C)	Concordia, Pcia. de Entre Ríos
16:00	Lovisa 20'	Report	Echenausi 38'	Stadium: Parque Mitre; Referee: Walter Báez

15 October 2014	Belgrano (E)	0–1	Cruz del Sur	Esquel, Pcia. de Chubut
17:00		Report	Fuentes 66'	Stadium: Municipal Dante Aristeo Brozzi; Referee: José Luis Soto

==== Round II ====
In this round, 36 qualified teams from the Round I and the remaining 52 teams from Torneo Federal B participated. The round was played between October 29 and November 12, in a single knock-out match format. The 44 winning teams advanced to the Round III.

29 October 2014	Petrolero Argentino	3–3 (4–2 p)	25 de Mayo (LP)	Plaza Huincul, Pcia. de Neuquén
17:00	Toledo 16'; Galván 22 ', 56'	Report	Badilla 18'; Alarcón 39'; Romero 79'	Stadium: 30 de Septiembre; Referee: Paolo Macchi

29 October 2014	Boxing Club	3–3 (5–3 p)	Germinal	Rio Gallegos, Pcia. de Santa Cruz
16:00	Altamirano 14 ', 26'; Matus 63'	Report	Torres 45+1'; Salinas 55 ', 57'	Stadium: Provincias Unidas y Rivadavia; Referee: Raúl Pagani

29 October 2014	Liniers (BB)	0–0 (3–0 p)	Tiro Federal (BB)	Bahía Blanca, Pcia. de Buenos Aires
20:30		Report		Stadium: Alejandro Pérez; Referee: Lucas Nieto

Sol de Mayo	Independiente (RC)

29 October 2014	Kimberley	0–1	América (GP)	Mar del Plata, Pcia. de Buenos Aires
16:00		Report	Rivas 87'	Stadium: José Antonio Valle; Referee: Diego Gil

29 October 2014	Sarmiento (A)	0–0 (5–4 p)	Defensores (VdM)	Ayacucho, Pcia. de Buenos Aires
20:00		Report		Stadium: Municipal de Ayacucho; Referee: Marcelo Sanz

5 November 2014	Agropecuario	2–2 (5–4 p)	Bragado Club	Carlos Casares, Pcia. de Buenos Aires
20:00	Wernly 47'; Santo Domingo 77'	Report	Palermo 59'; Fernández 90+1'	Stadium: De la Calle Carlos Arroyo; Referee: Jorge Potes

5 November 2014	Once Tigres	0–0 (4–5 p)	Argentinos (VdM)	Avenida 9 de Julio, Pcia. de Buenos Aires
21:00		Report		Stadium: Abel del Fabro; Referee: Gonzalo López

29 October 2014	Juventud (P)	0–0 (3–4 p)	La Emilia	Pergamino, Pcia. de Buenos Aires
20:30		Report		Stadium: Carlos Raúl Grondona; Referee: Gonzalo Ferrari

5 November 2014	Sports (S)	0–0 (2–4 p)	Atlético Camioneros	Salto, Pcia. de Buenos Aires
19:30		Report		Stadium: Esteban Chiari; Referee: Ricardo Romero

29 October 2014	Racing (O)	4–1	Sarmiento (CS)	Olavarría, Pcia. de Buenos Aires
21:00	Ordozgoiti 5'; Sampaoli 8'; Gomba 45+2'; Castellanos 53'	Report	Navarro 37'	Stadium: José Buglione Martinese; Referee: Facundo Elegart

30 October 2014	Everton	1–0	Ferrocarril Roca (LF)	La Plata, Pcia. de Buenos Aires
16:00	Bidondo 28' (pen.)	Report		Stadium: Predio Oscar Funes; Referee: Martín Zabaljauregui

29 October 2014	Rivadavia (L)	3–1	Jorge Newbery (J)	Lincoln, Pcia. de Buenos Aires
13:30	Velazquez 50'; Tolosa 71'; Visser 89'	Report	Morán 10'	Stadium: El Coliseo; Referee: Waldemar Roma

12 November 2014	Sportivo Baradero	1–0	Social y Deportivo Obrero	Baradero, Pcia. de Buenos Aires
21:00	Bahillo 45+1'	Report		Stadium: Sportivo Baradero; Referee: Hernán Martínez

29 October 2014	Viale Foot-Ball Club	1–0	Belgrano (P)	Viale, Pcia. de Entre Ríos
21:00	Claro 57'	Report		Stadium: La Loma; Referee: Jorge Zapata

29 October 2014	Defensores (P)	0–1	Colegiales (C)	Pronunciamiento, Pcia. de Entre Ríos
21:00		Report	Lovisa 65'	Stadium: Delio E. Cardozo; Referee: Daniel Pedreira

29 October 2014	Jorge Gibson Brown	2–0	Ex Alumnos Escuela N°185	Posadas, Pcia. de Misiones
21:00	Suirezs 19'; Gabadián 50'	Report		Stadium: Jorge Gibson Brown; Referee: Adrián Meza

30 October 2014	Ferroviario (C)	2–2 (6–5 p)	Huracán de Goya	Corrientes, Pcia. de Corrientes
16:30	Arriola 66'; Valenzuela 88'	Report	Ferreira 40'; Valenzuela 42'	Stadium: Juan Carlos Vallejos; Referee: Luis Pérez

29 October 2014	Juventud Unida (Ch)	1–1 (5–6 p)	Comercio (SS)	Charata, Pcia. de Chaco
22:00	Tossone 14'	Report	Pariani 40'	Stadium: Coliseo; Referee: Milton Van Lierde

29 October 2014	Independiente (Fo)	5–0	Sportivo (RSP)	Comandante Fontana, Pcia. de Formosa
17:00	Apicella 47'; Bareiro 66 ', 71'; Portillo 76'; Pérez 84'	Report		Stadium: 17 de Octubre; Referee: Víctor Vallejos

29 October 2014	Sanjustino	2–3	Ocampo Fábrica	San Justo, Pcia. de Santa Fe
21:00	Benítez 8'; Olivera 58'	Report	Midulla 3'; Aquino 46'; Godoy 90+3'	Stadium: Sanjustino; Referee: Walter Flores Ronconi

29 October 2014	Deportivo Fontana	3–1	San Carlos (LE)	Fontana, Pcia. de Chaco
16:00	Martínez 49'; González 77'; Kreni 90+4'	Report	Cardozo 23'	Stadium: Juan Alberto García; Referee: Sebastián Ibáñez

29 October 2014	Talleres (P)	4–0	Monterrico San Vicente	Perico, Pcia. de Jujuy
22:00	Juárez 12' (pen.); Rodríguez 45'; Segobia 22'; Cardozo 31'	Report		Stadium: Doctor Plinio Zabala; Referee: Juan Lagoria

29 October 2014	Tiro y Deportes Río Grande	1–3	Independiente (HY)	La Mendieta, Pcia. de Jujuy
16:00	Solorza 58'	Report	Navarrete 46'; Vicuña 76 ', 90'	Stadium: Raúl René Romero; Referee: Enzo Ramírez

29 October 2014	Atlético Pellegrini	0–3	Mitre (S)	Salta, Pcia. de Salta
21:30		Report	Alfaro 56'; Pichotti 76'; Gutiérrez 83'	Stadium: Atlético Pellegrini; Referee: Diego Lambertin

29 October 2014	Progreso (RdlF)	3–0	Atlético Chicoana	Rosario de la Frontera, Pcia. de Salta
21:30	Arru 40'; Pistone 57'; Rodríguez 84'	Report		Stadium: Municipal Rosario de la Frontera; Referee: Enzo Rivas

5 November 2014	Vélez Sarsfield (SR)	1–1 (4–2 p)	Güemes (SdE)	San Ramón, Pcia. de Santiago del Estero
22:00	Lescano 74'	Report	Castaño 82'	Stadium: Coliseo De Los Sueños; Referee: Angel Argañaraz

5 November 2014	Instituto Santiago	0–1	Sportivo Tintina	Santiago del Estero, Pcia. de Santiago del Estero
18:00		Report	Tobares 89' (pen.)	Stadium: Doctores José y Antonio Castiglione; Referee: Oscar Rivero

29 October 2014	Talleres (F)	1–1 (5–4 p)	Concepción FC	Frías, Pcia. de Santiago del Estero
17:15	Tapia 80'	Report	Tevez 15'	Stadium: Manuel Misael Castellanos; Referee: Juan Marcelo Luján

5 November 2014	Deportivo Aguilares	0–1	Deportivo Lastenia	Aguilares, Pcia. de Tucumán
17:00		Report	Lubo 27'	Stadium: Don Agustín Fernández; Referee: Diego Rodríguez Fernández

29 October 2014	Atlético Policial (C)	2–0	Juventud Alianza	San Fernando del Valle de Catamarca, Pcia. de Catamarca
21:00	Colman 12'; Tapia 39'	Report		Stadium: Bicentenario Ciudad de Catamarca; Referee: Gustavo Reynoso

5 November 2014	Unión Santiago	1–1 (5–6 p)	Atlético Concepción	Santiago del Estero, Pcia. de Santiago del Estero
22:00	Juárez 37'	Report	Di Pietro 89'	Stadium: Unión Santiago; Referee: Claudio Orellana

29 October 2014	Independiente (VO)	0–1	Desamparados (SJ)	San Juan, Pcia. de San Juan
17:30		Report	Naveda 56'	Stadium: Estadio del Bicentenario; Referee: Sebastián Fernández

29 October 2014	Atlético Trinidad	0–1	Sportivo Del Bono	San Juan, Pcia. de San Juan
17:30		Report	Villegas 72'	Stadium: El Templo; Referee: Rubén Riveros

29 October 2014	Pacífico	1–0	Jorge Newbery (VM)	General Alvear, Pcia. de Mendoza
21:30	Salinas 57'	Report		Stadium: Osvaldo Centioni; Referee: Angel Sosa

29 October 2014	Deportivo Guaymallén	2–0	Huracán (SR)	Guaymallén, Pcia. de Mendoza
16:30	Moreno 37'; Osurak 74'	Report		Stadium: Hugo Pedro Alastra; Referee: Carlos Lugea

29 October 2014	Atlético Argentino	1–1 (0–3 p)	Huracán Las Heras	San José, Pcia. de Mendoza
16:00	Jofré 45+1'	Report	Guerra 20'	Stadium: Ingeniero Mauricio Serra; Referee: Mauricio Sosa

29 October 2014	Gutiérrez	1–1 (0–2 p)	Atlético Palmira	General Gutiérrez, Pcia. de Mendoza
16:00	Abba 22'	Report	Pinea 12'	Stadium: General Gutiérrez; Referee: Guillermo Dávila

29 October 2014	Ben Hur	1–2	9 de Julio (R)	Rafaela, Pcia. de Santa Fe
21:00	Giuliani 47'	Report	Aguilar 39'; Arnold 41' (pen.)	Stadium: Parque Barrio Ilolay; Referee: Roberto Franco

29 October 2014	San Jorge (SF)	1–1 (2–4 p)	9 de Julio (M)	San Jorge, Pcia. de Santa Fe
21:15	Medina 49' (o.g.)	Report	González 53'	Stadium: Parque 23 de Junio; Referee: Daniel González

30 October 2014	Racing (C)	0–0 (3–4 p)	Argentino Peñarol	Córdoba, Pcia. de Córdoba
21:30		Report		Stadium: Miguel Sancho; Referee: Julio Quinteros

29 October 2014	Estudiantes (RC)	2–1	Sarmiento (L)	Río Cuarto, Pcia. de Córdoba
21:30	Dopazo 66 ', 73'	Report	Badaracco 60'	Stadium: Ciudad de Río Cuarto; Referee: Iván Ramonda

29 October 2014	Aprendices Casildenses	2–2 (4–2 p)	Sportivo Rivadavia (VT)	Casilda, Pcia. de Santa Fe
21:00	Armani 36'; Lucci 38'	Report	Tisera 56 ', 67'	Stadium: Aprendises Casildenses; Referee: Víctor Maidana

29 October 2014	Sportivo Las Parejas	0–5	Puerto General San Martín	Las Parejas, Pcia. de Santa Fe
19:00		Report	Monzón 25 ', 28'; Vázquez 40'; Jerez 61 ', 80'	Stadium: Fortaleza del Lobo; Referee: Rolando Serapio

==== Round III ====
In this round, 44 qualified teams from the Round II participated. The round was played between November 12 and November 19, in a single knock-out match format. The 22 winning teams advanced to the Round IV.

12 November 2014	Petrolero Argentino	0–0 (5–3 p)	Boxing Club	Plaza Huincul, Pcia. de Neuquén
17:00		Report		Stadium: 30 de Septiembre; Referee: Clemente Vazquez Antenor

Liniers (BB)	Independiente (RC)

12 November 2014	América (GP)	0–0 (6–5 p)	Sarmiento (A)	General Pirán, Pcia. de Buenos Aires
16:00		Report		Stadium: Don Bosco; Referee: Victor Hugo Gonzalez

12 November 2014	Agropecuario	3–2	Argentinos (VdM)	Carlos Casares, Pcia. de Buenos Aires
21:00	Urquijo 6'; Zamprogna 86 ', 90'	Report	Montiel 39'; Rivarola 63'	Stadium: De la Calle Carlos Arroyo; Referee: Cristian Blanco

19 November 2014	La Emilia	2–2 (7–6 p)	Atlético Camioneros	La Emilia, Pcia. de Buenos Aires
20:00	Rodriguez 53'; Rotondo 69'	Report	Gay 10'; Casimiro 31' (o.g.)	Stadium: Jacinto López; Referee: Mauricio Lespinard

12 November 2014	Racing (O)	2–1	Everton	Olavarría, Pcia. de Buenos Aires
21:00	Santellan 8'; Ordozgoiti 71'	Report	Margariño 63' (o.g.)	Stadium: José Buglione Martinese; Referee: Claudio Elichiri

19 November 2014	Rivadavia (L)	3–0	Sportivo Baradero	Lincoln, Pcia. de Buenos Aires
17:00	Tolosa 3 ', 40'; Barbosa 85'	Report		Stadium: El Coliseo; Referee: Alejandro Berruti

12 November 2014	Viale Foot-Ball Club	2–1	Colegiales (C)	Viale, Pcia. de Entre Rios
21:00	Claro 65 ', 86'	Report	Mondragon 43'	Stadium: La Loma; Referee: Leonardo Neivert

12 November 2014	Jorge Gibson Brown	2–2 (1–3 p)	Ferroviario (C)	Posadas, Pcia. de Misiones
21:00	Suirezs 84' (pen.), 90+2'	Report	Herrera 66'; Petry 76'	Stadium: Jorge Gibson Brown; Referee: Claudio Cubillas

12 November 2014	Comercio (SS)	0–0 (5–4 p)	Independiente (Fo)	Santa Sylvina, Pcia. de Chaco
20:30		Report		Referee: Patricio Quiroga

12 November 2014	Ocampo Fábrica	1–0	Deportivo Fontana	Villa Ocampo, Pcia. de Santa Fe
21:00	Aquino 11'	Report		Stadium: Atlético Ocampo Fábrica; Referee: Javier Magnago

19 November 2014	Talleres (P)	1–0	Independiente (HY)	Perico, Pcia. de Jujuy
21:00	Bordabossana 88'	Report		Stadium: Doctor Plinio Zabala; Referee: Nelson Bejas

12 November 2014	Mitre (S)	2–2 (3–1 p)	Progreso (RdlF)	Salta, Pcia. de Salta
22:00	Bonucelli 86'; Navarro 90+2'	Report	Escudero 16'; Torrado 88'	Stadium: Miguel Pascual Soler; Referee: Ariel Tello

12 November 2014	Vélez Sarsfield (SR)	3–2	Sportivo Tintina	San Ramón, Pcia. de Santiago del Estero
21:30	Luna 21 ', 23'; Paz 60'	Report	Gallardo 42'; Rodríguez 61'	Stadium: Coliseo De Los Sueños; Referee: Sebastián Barrionuevo

12 November 2014	Talleres (F)	1–1 (2–4 p)	Deportivo Lastenia	Frías, Pcia. de Santiago del Estero
17:00	Tapia 28'	Report	Vega 67' (pen.)	Stadium: Manuel Misael Castellanos; Referee: Rodrigo Rivero

12 November 2014	Atlético Policial (C)	1–0	Atlético Concepción	San Fernando del Valle de Catamarca, Pcia. de Catamarca
21:45	Castro 2'	Report		Stadium: Bicentenario Ciudad de Catamarca; Referee: Carlos Roldan

12 November 2014	Desamparados (SJ)	1–3	Sportivo Del Bono	San Juan, Pcia. de San Juan
21:30	Brun 45+3' (pen.)	Report	Padilla 23'; Quiroga 76 ', 86'	Stadium: El Serpentario; Referee: Nicolás Rímolo

13 November 2014	Pacífico	4–1	Deportivo Guaymallén	General Alvear, Pcia. de Mendoza
21:30	Anzorena 32'; Bodnarsky 36'; Farias 64'; Salinas 69'	Report	Gallardo 46'	Stadium: Osvaldo Centioni; Referee: Carlos Salinas

12 November 2014	Huracán Las Heras	2–0	Atlético Palmira	Las Heras, Pcia. de Mendoza
17:00	Martín 63 ', 65'	Report		Stadium: Nicolás Blázquez; Referee: Guillermo Davila

12 November 2014	9 de Julio (R)	0–2	9 de Julio (M)	Rafaela, Pcia. de Santa Fe
21:00		Report	Lapalma 33'; Gaido 58'	Stadium: El Coloso

12 November 2014	Argentino Peñarol	1–3	Estudiantes (RC)	Córdoba, Pcia. de Córdoba
17:15	Nuñez 47'	Report	Anzorena 2' (o.g.); Ribotta 32'; Flordelmundo 76'	Stadium: El Trampero; Referee: Dario Españon

12 November 2014	Aprendices Casildenses	0–1	Puerto General San Martín	Casilda, Pcia. de Santa Fe
21:00		Report	Cura 61' (pen.)	Stadium: Aprendices Casildenses; Referee: Roberto Franco

==== Round IV ====
In this round, 22 qualified teams from the Round III participated. The round was played between November 26 and November 27, in a single knock-out match format. The 11 winning teams advanced to the Final Stage.

26 November 2014	Petrolero Argentino	0–0 (2–4 p)	Liniers (BB)	Plaza Huincul, Pcia. de Neuquén
17:00		Report		Stadium: 30 de Septiembre; Referee: José Higueras

26 November 2014	Racing (O)	1–1 (4–3 p)	América (GP)	Olavarría, Pcia. de Buenos Aires
21:00	Espinoza 20'	Report	Rivas 38'	Stadium: José Buglione Martinese; Referee: Daniel Grazziano

26 November 2014	Rivadavia (L)	0–1	Agropecuario	Lincoln, Pcia. de Buenos Aires
17:00		Report	Azcona 66'	Stadium: El Coliseo; Referee: Alejo Cid

26 November 2014	Ferroviario (C)	1–1 (2–3 p)	Viale Foot-Ball Club	Corrientes, Pcia. de Corrientes
17:00	Petry 88' (pen.)	Report	Alegre 18'	Stadium: Juan Carlos Vallejos; Referee: Adrián Meza

26 November 2014	Ocampo Fábrica	1–1 (6–5 p)	Comercio (SS)	Villa Ocampo, Pcia. de Santa Fe
21:30	Benegas 90+2'	Report	Bocos 60'	Stadium: Atlético Ocampo Fábrica; Referee: Agustín Rossi

26 November 2014	Mitre (S)	2–0	Talleres (P)	Salta, Pcia. de Salta
21:30	Alfaro 87 ', 90+3'	Report		Stadium: Miguel Pascual Soler; Referee: Ramón Segovia

26 November 2014	Vélez Sarsfield (SR)	1–0	Deportivo Lastenia	San Ramón, Pcia. de Santiago del Estero
22:00	Luna 84'	Report		Stadium: Coliseo De Los Sueños; Referee: Luis Pesoa

27 November 2014	Sportivo Del Bono	1–0	Atlético Policial (C)	Rivadavia, Pcia. de San Juan
17:00	Villegas 54'	Report		Stadium: Juan Bautista Del Bono; Referee: Mauricio Sosa

Pacífico		Huracán Las Heras
	Report

26 November 2014	Estudiantes (RC)	3–1	9 de Julio (M)	Río Cuarto, Pcia. de Córdoba
17:00	Flordelmundo 40'; Pérez 44'; Colazo 61'	Report	Gaido 89'	Stadium: Ciudad de Río Cuarto; Referee: Julio Quinteros

26 November 2014	La Emilia	2–1	Puerto General San Martín	La Emilia, Pcia. de Buenos Aires
20:30	Rotondo 48'; Alfeiran 90+2'	Report	Villalba 64'	Stadium: Jacinto López; Referee: Claudio Nota

=== Regional Final Stage ===
In this round, 11 qualified teams from the Round II of Group A and 11 qualified teams from the Round IV of Group B. The round was played between December 4 and February 22, in a single knock-out match format. The 11 winning teams advanced to the Final Round.

11 December 2014	CAI	0–2	Liniers (BB)	Comodoro Rivadavia, Pcia. de Chubut
17:00		Report	Nievas 52'; Acosta 90+4'	Stadium: Municipal de Comodoro Rivadavia; Referee: Santiago Ascenzi

22 February 2015	Independiente (N)	1–0	Racing (O)	Neuquén, Pcia. de Neuquén
17:30	Porra 64'	Report		Stadium: La Chacra; Referee: Esteban Jofré

11 December 2014	Juventud Unida Universitario	1–1 (3–4 p)	Huracán Las Heras	San Luis, Pcia. de San Luis
17:00	Peralta 84'	Report	Benito 45+2'	Stadium: Mario Sebastián Diez; Referee: Diego Gallo

4 December 2014	Defensores de Belgrano (VR)	4–1	Agropecuario	Villa Ramallo, Pcia. de Buenos Aires
21:00	Castro 13'; Torrent 28 ', 43'; Ceballos 90+1'	Report	Fernandez 65'	Stadium: Salomón Boeseldín; Referee: Walter Ferreyra

4 December 2014	Estudiantes (RC)	2–4	Alianza (CM)	Río Cuarto, Pcia. de Córdoba
21:15	Gigena 13'; Colazzo 83'	Report	Tommasini 27'; Reynoso 41 ', 87'; Jaime 50' (o.g.)	Stadium: Ciudad de Río Cuarto; Referee: Claudio Pavón

11 December 2014	Alumni (VM)	0–2	La Emilia	Villa María, Pcia. de Córdoba
21:30		Report	Ledesma 6' (pen.); Trachitti 90'	Stadium: Plaza Manuel Anselmo Ocampo; Referee: Leandro Bottoni

4 December 2014	Sol de América (F)	5–2	Ocampo Fábrica	Formosa, Pcia. de Formosa
20:30	Riquelme 5 ', 9'; Magno 49'; Santa Cruz 79 ', 87'	Report	Aquino 22' (pen.); Peyrano 39'	Stadium: Antonio Romero; Referee: Jorge Sosa

4 December 2014	Gimnasia y Esgrima (CdU)	0–1	Viale Foot-Ball Club	Concepción del Uruguay, Pcia. de Entre Ríos
21:15		Report	Alzogaray 35'	Stadium: Manuel y Ramón Núñez; Referee: José Sandoval

4 December 2014	San Martín (T)	4–0	Vélez Sarsfield (SR)	San Miguel de Tucumán, Pcia. de Tucumán
21:30	Serrano 1 ', 11'; Velasco 62 ', 81'	Report		Stadium: La Ciudadela

11 December 2014	Andino (LR)	0–0 (4–3 p)	Sportivo Del Bono	La Rioja, Pcia. de La Rioja
21:30		Report		Stadium: 20 de Agosto; Referee: Francisco Acosta

11 December 2014	Altos Hornos Zapla	4–0	Mitre (S)	Palpalá, Pcia. de Jujuy
22:00	Ruiz 12'; Cartello 19'; Guaymas 78'; Salto 83'	Report		Stadium: Emilio Fabrizzi; Referee: Ariel Montero

== Metropolitan Round ==
This round is organized directly by the AFA.

=== Group 1 ===
==== Round I ====
In this first round, 18 teams from the Primera D and 14 from the Primera C participated. The round was played between November 22 and February 9, in a single match knock-out format. The 16 winning teams advanced to the Round II.

8 February 2015	Cañuelas	1–3	Dock Sud	Cañuelas, Pcia. de Buenos Aires
17:00	Brunetti 81'	Report	Rodriguez 8'; Cigno 35 ', 75'	Stadium: Jorge Alfredo Arín; Referee: Gonzalo Beloso

24 November 2014	Sacachispas	3–1	Central Córdoba (R)	Villa Soldati, Buenos Aires
17:00	Varela 2 ', 80'; Dominguez 30'	Report	Amilivia 68'	Stadium: Roberto Larrosa; Referee: Antonio Amato

24 November 2014	Ituzaingó	0–0 (4–5 p)	Yupanqui	Ituzaingó, Greater Buenos Aires
17:00		Report		Stadium: Ituzaingó; Referee: Hernán Dellacasa

3 December 2014	Claypole	0–3	Atlas	Claypole, Greater Buenos Aires
17:00		Report	Moreno 25'; Paulerena 35'; Dominguez 68' (pen.)	Stadium: Rodolfo Capocasa; Referee: Sebastián Zunino

8 February 2015	General Lamadrid	1–1 (5–4 p)	San Telmo	Villa Devoto, Buenos Aires
17:00	Peralta Cabrera 90+5' (pen.)	Report	Segundo 43'	Stadium: Enrique VI; Referee: Diego Colombo

25 November 2014	Central Ballester	1–0	San Martín (B)	Munro, Greater Buenos Aires
17:00	Doval 54'	Report		Stadium: Libertarios Unidos; Referee: Ariel Roldán

27 November 2014	Talleres (RdE)	0–2	El Porvenir	Remedios de Escalada, Greater Buenos Aires
19:00		Report	Correa 6'; Russo 90+4'	Stadium: Talleres de Remedios de Escalada; Referee: Juan Ledo

4 December 2014	Muñiz	0–3	Excursionistas	Muñiz, Greater Buenos Aires
17:00		Report	Silvani 10 ', 86'; Villanueva 36'	Stadium: Malvinas Argentinas; Referee: Juan Pafundi

8 February 2015	Centro Español	1–1 (3–4 p)	San Miguel	San Justo, Greater Buenos Aires
17:00	Tissera 60'	Report	Almiron 14'	Stadium: Juan Antonio Arias; Referee: Diego Molina

7 February 2015	Leandro N. Alem	1–0	Lugano	General Rodríguez, Pcia. de Buenos Aires
17:00	dell Arcipret 57'	Report		Stadium: Municipal de Pilar; Referee: Jorge Mitre

23 November 2014	Defensores Unidos	1–2	Liniers	Zárate, Pcia. de Buenos Aires
17:00	Davio 24'	Report	Horacio 49'; Cantero 75'	Stadium: Gigante de Villa Fox; Referee: Juan Pablo Battaglia

9 February 2015	Deportivo Riestra	6–0	Victoriano Arenas	Flores, Buenos Aires
17:00	Herrera 21 ', 24 ', 80 ', 81'; Ruiz 41 ', 60'	Report		Stadium: Guillermo Laza; Referee: Ariel Roldán

27 November 2014	J. J. de Urquiza	2–0	Argentino (M)	Loma Hermosa, Greater Buenos Aires
17:00	Parodi 45+2'; Aragon 88' (pen.)	Report		Stadium: Ramón Roque Martín; Referee: Lucas Comesaña

22 November 2014	Juventud Unida	2–1	Argentino (R)	San Miguel, Greater Buenos Aires
17:00	Essers 28' (pen.); Rodríguez 77'	Report	Ramirez 67'	Stadium: Néstor Bedgni; Referee: Jorge Mitre

8 February 2015	Sportivo Barracas	0–1	Berazategui	Ciudad Evita, Pcia. de Buenos Aires
20:00		Report	Salomone 38'	Stadium: República de Italia; Referee: Alejandro Ramírez

22 November 2014	Puerto Nuevo	1–1 (1–3 p)	Luján	Campana, Pcia. de Buenos Aires
17:00	Grecco 30'	Report	Scarnato 75'	Stadium: Rubén Carlos Vallejos; Referee: Fernando Velarde

==== Round II ====
In this round, 16 qualified teams from the Round I and the 6 remaining teams from Primera C participated. The round was played between February 25 and March 20, in a single match knock-out format. The 11 winning teams advanced to the Metropolitan Final Stage.

7 March 2015	Yupanqui	1–2	Atlas	La Matanza, Greater Buenos Aires
17:00	Sandoval 12'	Report	Gnocchi 45'; Cristofanelli 90+3' (pen.)	Stadium: Juan Antonio Arias; Referee: Edgardo Kopanchuk

25 February 2015	Excursionistas	0–0 (4–3 p)	San Miguel	Barracas, Buenos Aires
17:00		Report		Stadium: Claudio "Chiqui" Tapia; Referee: Gonzalo Beloso

3 March 2015	General Lamadrid	0–0 (5–4 p)	Defensores de Belgrano	Villa Devoto, Buenos Aires
17:00		Report		Stadium: Enrique VI; Referee: Cristian Benítez

20 March 2015	El Porvenir	2–2 (4–5 p)	Flandria	Gerli, Greater Buenos Aires
16:00	Ibáñez 14'; Correa 37'	Report	de Hoyos 5'; Pineda 54'	Stadium: Gildo Francisco Ghersinich; Referee: Lucas Comesaña

12 March 2015	J. J. de Urquiza	4–1	Ferrocarril Midland	Loma Hermosa, Greater Buenos Aires
16:00	Parodi 15 ', 37'; Gimenez 54' (o.g.); Macalik 80'	Report	Peralta 31' (pen.)	Stadium: Ramón Roque Martín; Referee: Antonio Amato

10 March 2015	Leandro N. Alem	5–4	Juventud Unida	General Rodríguez, Pcia. de Buenos Aires
16:00	Tiedemann 12 ', 57 ', 90+6'; Cristeff 45 ', 47'	Report	Leizza 45+1'; Mosman 52 ', 47'; Vivanco 54 ', 62' (pen.)	Stadium: Municipal de Pilar; Referee: Ariel Roldán

19 March 2015	Liniers	2–1	Defensores de Cambaceres	La Matanza, Greater Buenos Aires
16:00	Coronel 20'; Stansiola 48'	Report	Gonzalez 80'	Stadium: Juan Antonio Arias; Referee: Gastón Iglesias

11 March 2015	Luján	1–1 (0–3 p)	Berazategui	Luján, Pcia. de Buenos Aires
16:00	Horacio 45'	Report	Pellegrini 71'	Stadium: Municipal de Luján; Referee: Rodrigo Sabini

25 February 2015	Dock Sud	2–1	Argentino (Q)	Dock Sud, Greater Buenos Aires
17:00	Lugarzo 48'; Cigno 67' (pen.)	Report	Spindola 41'	Stadium: Estadio de Los Inmigrantes; Referee: Juan Pafundi

17 March 2015	Central Ballester	0–0 (1–3 p)	Deportivo Riestra	Loma Hermosa, Greater Buenos Aires
16:00		Report		Stadium: Ramón Roque Martín; Referee: Diego Molinelli

10 March 2015	Sacachispas	0–1	Laferrere	Villa Soldati, Buenos Aires
16:00		Report	Fernández 57' (pen.)	Stadium: Roberto Larrosa; Referee: Damián Rubino

=== Group 2 ===
==== Round I ====
In this first round, 22 teams from the Primera B participated. The round was played between November 22 and February 8, in a single match knock-out format. The 11 winning teams advanced to Metropolitan Final Stage.

7 February 2015	Villa Dálmine	0–0 (2–3 p)	Tristán Suárez	Campana, Pcia. de Buenos Aires
20:00		Report		Stadium: El Coliseo de Mitre y Puccini; Referee: Lucas Di Bastiano

22 November 2014	Platense	0–0 (7–8 p)	Deportivo Armenio	Florida, Greater Buenos Aires
17:00		Report		Stadium: Ciudad de Vicente López; Referee: Carlos Stoklas

7 February 2015	Atlanta	2–1	Villa San Carlos	Villa Crespo, Buenos Aires
17:00	Serrano 53' (pen.); Maraschi 62'	Report	Pasquale 10'	Stadium: Don León Kolbovski; Referee: Hernán Mastrángelo

8 February 2015	Deportivo Merlo	1–1 (4–2 p)	Barracas Central	Tristán Suárez, Pcia. de Buenos Aires
17:00	Rudler 90'	Report	Abalos 48'	Stadium: 20 de Octubre; Referee: Julio Barraza

7 February 2015	Almagro	0–1	Estudiantes (BA)	José Ingenieros, Greater Buenos Aires
17:00		Report	Gómez 84'	Stadium: Tres de Febrero; Referee: Yamil Possi

7 February 2015	Brown	0–1	Deportivo Español	Adrogué, Greater Buenos Aires
17:00		Report	Villaba 24'	Stadium: Lorenzo Arandilla; Referee: Eduardo Gutiérrez

7 February 2015	Acassuso	1–1 (3–2 p)	Deportivo Morón	Florida, Greater Buenos Aires
17:00	Gomez 50'	Report	Martinez 43'	Stadium: Ciudad de Vicente López; Referee: Gastón Meineri

24 November 2014	Almirante Brown	3–0	Colegiales	Isidro Casanova, Greater Buenos Aires
17:00	Presedo 25'; Rodriguez 71'; Romero 81'	Report		Stadium: Fragata Pte. Sarmiento; Referee: José Carreras

8 February 2015	Los Andes	2–0	Fénix	Lomas de Zamora, Greater Buenos Aires
17:00	Lorefice 77'; Galeano 85'	Report		Stadium: Eduardo Gallardón; Referee: Américo Monsalvo

29 November 2014	Comunicaciones	3–0	Sportivo Italiano	Agronomía, Buenos Aires
17:00	Vatter 47'; Pintos 79'; Gibelli 90+7'	Report		Stadium: Alfredo Ramos; Referee: Germán Bermúdez

6 February 2015	Chacarita Juniors	2–0	UAI Urquiza	Villa Maipú, Greater Buenos Aires
17:00	Manso 25'; Bordacahar 48'	Report		Stadium: Chacarita Juniors; Referee: Pablo Giménez

=== Metropolitan Final Stage ===
In this round, 11 qualified teams from the Round II of Group 1 and 11 qualified teams from the Round I of Group 2 participated. The round was played between March 25 and April 8, in a single knock-out match format. The 11 winning teams advanced to the Final Round.

8 April 2015	General Lamadrid	2–2 (2–4 p)	Los Andes	Villa Devoto, Buenos Aires
15:00	Godoy 36'; Peralta Cabrera 80'	Report	Noriega 68'; Cisterna 90+4'	Stadium: Enrique VI; Referee: Pablo Dóvalo

26 March 2015	Laferrere	0–0 (3–4 p)	Atlanta	Barracas, Buenos Aires
15:00		Report		Stadium: Claudio "Chiqui" Tapia; Referee: Pablo Giménez

2 April 2015	Chacarita Juniors	1–0	Atlas	Villa Maipú, Greater Buenos Aires
16:30	Soto Torres 15'	Report		Stadium: Chacarita Juniors; Referee: Carlos Stoklas

25 March 2015	Deportivo Armenio	0–0 (4–3 p)	Berazategui	Ingeniero Maschwitz, Pcia. de Buenos Aires
15:00		Report		Stadium: Estadio Armenia; Referee: Cristian Benitez

25 March 2015	Leandro N. Alem	0–1	Deportivo Merlo	General Rodríguez, Pcia. de Buenos Aires
15:00		Report	Rodríguez 36'	Stadium: Municipal de Pilar; Referee: Lucas Comesaña

25 March 2015	Tristán Suárez	2–3	Deportivo Riestra	Tristán Suárez, Pcia. de Buenos Aires
15:00	Alonso 31'; Farías 48'	Report	Soto 53'; Flores 61'; Bravo 70'	Stadium: 20 de Octubre; Referee: Lucas di Bastiano

31 March 2015	Deportivo Español	0–0 (4–3 p)	J. J. de Urquiza	Parque Avellaneda, Buenos Aires
18:00		Report		Stadium: Estadio Nueva España; Referee: Mauro Biasutto

1 April 2015	Flandria	0–0 (5–4 p)	Almirante Brown	Jáuregui, Pcia. de Buenos Aires
15:00		Report		Stadium: Carlos V Referee: Paulo Vigliano

25 March 2015	Acassuso	0–0 (5–4 p)	Excursionistas	Florida, Greater Buenos Aires
18:00		Report		Stadium: Ciudad de Vicente López; Referee: Mauro Biasutto

2 April 2015	Comunicaciones	0–0 (3–2 p)	Liniers	Agronomía, Buenos Aires
15:00		Report		Stadium: Alfredo Ramos; Referee: Yael Falcón Pérez

2 April 2015	Estudiantes (BA)	3–2	Dock Sud	Caseros, Pcia. de Buenos Aires
11:30	Strillevsky 4'; Benítez 63'; Torres 80'	Report	Miranda Moreira 13 ', 71'	Stadium: Ciudad de Caseros; Referee: Rodrigo Sabini

== Final round ==
=== Bracket ===
==== Upper bracket ====
Round of 64
River Plate	2
Liniers (BB)	0
Rosario Central	3
Deportivo Riestra	1
Ferro Carril Oeste (p)	1 (5)
Boca Unidos	1 (3)
Crucero del Norte	0
Los Andes	2
Quilmes	2
Sportivo Belgrano	0
Huracán	0
Indepte. Rivadavia	1
San Martín (SJ) (p)	1 (7)
Estudiantes (BA)	1 (6)
Estudiantes (LP)	2
Ramón Santamarina	1
Racing	2
Independiente (N)	0
Tigre	1
Gimnasia y Esgrima (J)	0
Olimpo	1 (3)
Atlanta (p)	1 (4)
Aldosivi	0 (5)
Comunicaciones (p)	0 (6)
Atlético de Rafaela (p)	1 (4)
Flandria	1 (3)
Sarmiento (J)	1
Deportivo Merlo	2
Belgrano	0 (2)
Instituto (p)	0 (4)
San Lorenzo	3
Viale	0

Round of 32
River Plate	0
Rosario Central	2
Ferro Carril Oeste (p)	3 (4)
Los Andes	3 (1)
Quilmes	3
Indepte. Rivadavia	0
San Martín (SJ)	1 (5)
Estudiantes (LP) (p)	1 (6)
Racing	2
Tigre	1
Atlanta (p)	1 (7)
Comunicaciones	1 (6)
Atlético de Rafaela	5
Deportivo Merlo	1
Instituto	1
San Lorenzo	2

Round of 16
Rosario Central (p)	0 (5)
Ferro Carril Oeste	0 (3)
Quilmes	1 (1)
Estudiantes (LP)	1 (3) (p)
Racing (p)	1 (4)
Atlanta	1 (2)
Atlético de Rafaela	0
San Lorenzo	1

Quarterfinals
Rosario Central	2
Estudiantes (LP)	1
Racing	2
San Lorenzo	1

Semifinals
Rosario Central	1
Racing	0

==== Lower bracket ====
Round of 64
Independiente (p)	1 (4)
Alianza (M)	1 (1)
Godoy Cruz	0
Deportivo Español	1
Lanús	2
Atlético Tucumán	0
Nueva Chicago	2
Def. de Belgrano (VR)	1
Unión	2
Deportivo Armenio	1
Gimnasia y Esgrima (LP)	2
Altos Hornos Zapla	0
Colón	0 (4)
Acassuso (p)	0 (5)
Vélez Sarsfield	3
La Emilia	0
Newell's Old Boys	0
Chacarita Juniors	2
All Boys	2
Douglas Haig	1
Temperley (p)	1 (2)
Patronato	1 (0)
Defensa y Justicia	3
Andino (LR)	0
Argentinos Juniors	3
San Martín (T)	0
Arsenal	1
Guaraní Antonio Franco	2
Banfield	1
Sol de América	0
Boca Juniors	2
Huracán (LH)	0

Round of 32
Independiente	1
Deportivo Español	0
Lanús	3
Nueva Chicago	0
Unión	0 (5)
Gimn. y Esg. (LP) (p)	0 (6)
Acassuso	0
Vélez Sarsfield	3
Chacarita Juniors	2
All Boys	1
Temperley	1 (3)
Defensa y Justicia (p)	1 (5)
Argentinos Juniors	0
Guaraní Antonio Franco	1
Banfield	0
Boca Juniors	3

Round of 16
Independiente	0
Lanús	2
Gimn. y Esg. (LP)	0
Vélez Sarsfield	1
Chacarita Juniors	0
Defensa y Justicia	1
Guaraní Antonio Franco	0
Boca Juniors	4

Quarterfinals
Lanús (p)	1 (4)
Vélez Sarsfield	1 (2)
Defensa y Justicia	1
Boca Juniors	2

Semifinals
Lanús	0
Boca Juniors	2

=== Round of 64 ===
This round will have 11 qualified teams from the Regional Round, 11 qualified teams from the Metropolitana Round, 22 teams from Primera B Nacional and 20 teams from Primera División. The round was played between March 18 and July 1, in a single knock-out match format. The 32 winning teams advanced to the Round of 32. The draw took place on 10 February 2015.

3 June 2015	River Plate	2–0	Liniers (BB)	Formosa, Pcia. de Formosa
21:15	Funes Mori 19'; Kaprof 33'	Report		Stadium: Estadio Antonio Romero; Referee: Ariel Penel

27 May 2015	Boca Juniors	2–0	Huracán Las Heras	San Juan, Pcia. de San Juan
20:00	Osvaldo 84'; Chávez 87'	Report		Stadium: Estadio del Bicentenario; Referee: Sergio Pezzotta

26 April 2015	Independiente	1–1 (4–1 p)	Alianza (CM)	Córdoba, Pcia. de Córdoba
21:10	Ortíz 86'	Report	Reynoso 6'	Stadium: Estadio Mario Alberto Kempes; Referee: Sergio Pezzotta
	Penalties
	Lucero (penalty scored); Victorino (penalty scored); Ortíz (penalty scored); Benítez (penalty scored)		Airaudo (penalty scored); Rivadero (penalty missed); Zalazar (penalty missed)

20 May 2015	San Lorenzo	3–0	Viale Foot-Ball Club	Formosa, Pcia. de Formosa
21:00	Verón 12'; Cauteruccio 62'; Cardona 86'	Report		Stadium: Estadio Antonio Romero; Referee: Saúl Laverni

3 June 2015	Racing	2–0	Independiente (N)	Lanús, Pcia. de Buenos Aires
19:00	Fernández 49 ', 63'	Report		Stadium: Estadio Ciudad de Lanús; Referee: Saúl Laverni

22 April 2015	Vélez Sársfield	3–0	La Emilia	Banfield, Pcia. de Buenos Aires
15:00	Cardozo 19'; Villalba 71'; Pavone 90+1'	Report		Stadium: Estadio Florencio Sola; Referee: Fernando Espinoza

19 May 2015	Newell's Old Boys	0–2	Chacarita Juniors	Banfield, Pcia. de Buenos Aires
16:00		Report	Zapata 43'; Ugo Carabelli 80'	Stadium: Estadio Florencio Sola; Referee: Luis Alvarez

4 June 2015	Estudiantes (LP)	2–1	Santamarina	Sarandí, Pcia. de Buenos Aires
20:00	Carrillo 82 ', 90+2'	Report	Michel 44'	Stadium: Estadio Julio Humberto Grondona; Referee: Alejandro Castro

29 April 2015	Quilmes	2–0	Sportivo Belgrano	Córdoba, Pcia. de Córdoba
20:10	Bieler 40'; Pérez Guedes 64'	Report		Stadium: Estadio Juan Domingo Perón; Referee: Mauro Giannini

26 March 2015	Defensa y Justicia	3–0	Andino (LR)	San Juan, Pcia. de San Juan
21:00	Acevedo 23'; Busse 86'; Cabrera 90'	Report		Stadium: Estadio del Bicentenario; Referee: Mario Ejarque

20 May 2015	Unión	2–1	Deportivo Armenio	Córdoba, Pcia. de Córdoba
15:00	Malcorra 11'; Fabro 51'	Report	Alvarez 42'	Stadium: Estadio Juan Domingo Perón; Referee: Ariel Penel

3 June 2015	Aldosivi	0–0 (5–6 p)	Comunicaciones	Florida, Greater Buenos Aires
14:00		Report		Stadium: Ciudad de Vicente López; Referee: Facundo Tello
	Penalties
	Díaz (penalty scored); Galván (penalty scored); Vildozo (penalty scored); Menseguez (penalty scored); Martínez (penalty scored); Lugüercio (penalty missed)		(penalty scored) Vatter; (penalty scored) Vaccaría; (penalty scored) Cattáneo; (penalty scored) Castagno; (penalty scored) Montenegro; (penalty scored) Ramella

27 May 2015	Atlético de Rafaela	1–1 (4–3 p)	Flandria	San Francisco, Pcia. de Córdoba
18:00	Depetris 90+4'	Report	de Hoyos 45'	Stadium: Estadio Oscar C. Boero; Referee: Ignacio Lupani
	Penalties
	Niz (penalty scored); Depetris (penalty missed); González (penalty scored); Fernández (penalty scored); Colombo (penalty missed); Pussetto (penalty scored)		(penalty missed) Vicente; (penalty scored) Chmil; (penalty missed) Escuredo; (penalty scored) López; (penalty scored) Montenegro; (penalty missed) Porcel

26 March 2015	Nueva Chicago	2–1	Defensores de Belgrano (VR)	Parque Patricios, Buenos Aires
17:00	Baldunciel 10'; Lentini 83'	Report	Bulgarelli 7'	Stadium: Tomás A. Ducó; Referee: Fernando Espinoza

23 April 2015	Argentinos Juniors	3–0	San Martín (T)	Salta, Pcia. de Salta
20:10	Rinaldi 12 ', 33'; Castillejos 29'	Report		Stadium: Estadio Padre Ernesto Martearena; Referee: Alejandro Castro

27 May 2015	Crucero del Norte	0–2	Los Andes	Lanús, Pcia. de Buenos Aires
18:00		Report	Gutiérrez 27 ', 67'	Stadium: Estadio Ciudad de Lanús; Referee: Fernando Espinoza

20 May 2015	Ferro Carril Oeste	1–1 (5–3 p)	Boca Unidos	Sarandí, Pcia. de Buenos Aires
15:00	Aragón 13'	Report	Vizcarra 47'	Stadium: Estadio Julio Humberto Grondona; Referee: Juan Pablo Pompei
	Penalties
	Salmerón (penalty scored); Bazán (penalty scored); Frontini (penalty scored); Sainz (penalty scored); Achucarro (penalty scored)		(penalty missed) Vizcarra; (penalty scored) Baroni; (penalty scored) Escobar; (penalty scored) Montero

29 April 2015	Arsenal	1–2	Guaraní Antonio Franco	Formosa, Pcia. de Formosa
21:00	Silva 27'	Report	Alba 37'; Gómez 68'	Stadium: Estadio Antonio Romero; Referee: Alejandro Castro

27 May 2015	Lanús	2–0	Atlético Tucumán	Salta, Pcia. de Salta
19:00	Gómez 60'; Ayala 74'	Report		Stadium: Estadio Padre Ernesto Martearena; Referee: Federico Beligoy

22 April 2015	Sarmiento (J)	1–2	Deportivo Merlo	Florida, Greater Buenos Aires
15:00	Cacheiro 6'	Report	Rodríguez 61 ', 64'	Stadium: Ciudad de Vicente López; Referee: Nicolás Lamolina

8 April 2015	Olimpo	1–1 (3–4 p)	Atlanta	Junín, Pcia. de Buenos Aires
16:00	Blanco 28'	Report	Martínez 29'	Stadium: Estadio Eva Perón; Referee: Mariano González
	Penalties
	Blanco (penalty scored); Moiraghi (penalty scored); Vidal (penalty scored); Soñer (penalty missed); Champagne (penalty missed)		(penalty scored) Galeano; (penalty missed) Torres; (penalty scored) Navarro; (penalty scored) Bonfigli; (penalty scored) Pedrozo

6 May 2015	Gimnasia y Esgrima (LP)	2–0	Altos Hornos Zapla	Formosa, Pcia. de Formosa
21:30	Barsottini 13'; Mazzola 90+2'	Report		Stadium: Estadio Antonio Romero; Referee: Luis Alvarez

18 March 2015	Temperley	1–1 (2–0 p)	Patronato	Sarandí, Pcia. de Buenos Aires
17:00	Grbec 51' (pen.)	Report	Mirabaje 80'	Stadium: Estadio Julio Humberto Grondona; Referee: Luis Alvarez
	Penalties
	Oroná (penalty missed); Aguirre (penalty missed); Dinenno (penalty scored); Bojanich (penalty scored)		(penalty missed) Bértoli; (penalty missed) Geminiani; (penalty missed) Garrido; (penalty missed) Minetti

1 July 2015	Huracán	0–1	Independiente Rivadavia	Córdoba, Pcia. de Córdoba
20:10		Report	Pereyra 74'	Stadium: Estadio Juan Domingo Perón; Referee: Héctor Paletta

11 June 2015	San Martín (SJ)	1–1 (7–6 p)	Estudiantes (BA)	San Juan, Pcia. de San Juan
21:00	Bogado 90+1'	Report	Benítez 62'	Stadium: Estadio del Bicentenario; Referee: Pedro Argañaraz
	Penalties
	Bogado (penalty scored); Figueroa (penalty missed); Milano (penalty scored); Ardente (penalty scored); Ledesma (penalty scored); Aparicio (penalty scored); Covea (penalty scored); Pinedo (penalty scored)		(penalty missed) Torres; (penalty scored) Álvarez; (penalty scored) Seri; (penalty scored) Benítez; (penalty scored) Lópes; (penalty scored) Joao; (penalty scored) Barbeito; (penalty missed) Bochi

9 April 2015	All Boys	2–1	Douglas Haig	Lanús, Pcia. de Buenos Aires
18:30	Perea 52'; Pirchio 86'	Report	Martín 89'	Stadium: Estadio Ciudad de Lanús; Referee: Alejandro Castro

28 May 2015	Colón	0–0 (4–5 p)	Acassuso	Córdoba, Pcia. de Córdoba
15:00		Report		Stadium: Estadio Juan Domingo Perón; Referee: Nicolás Lamolina
	Penalties
	Fernández (penalty scored); Becerra (penalty scored); Ferracuti (penalty scored); Poblete (penalty scored); Eguren (penalty missed)		(penalty scored) Minici; (penalty scored) Parentini; (penalty scored) Prim; (penalty scored) Fioritti; (penalty scored) Chao

23 April 2015	Tigre	1–0	Gimnasia y Esgrima (J)	Formosa, Pcia. de Formosa
21:00	Luna 82'	Report		Stadium: Estadio Antonio Romero; Referee: Ariel Penel

8 April 2015	Belgrano	0–0 (2–4 p)	Instituto	Córdoba, Pcia. de Córdoba
21:00		Report		Stadium: Estadio Mario Alberto Kempes; Referee: Juan Pablo Pompei
	Penalties
	Pérez (penalty missed); Lema (penalty scored); Parodi (penalty missed); Zelarrayán (penalty scored)		(penalty missed) Machín; (penalty scored) Gotti; (penalty scored) Bauman; (penalty scored) Hoyos; (penalty scored) García

13 May 2015	Godoy Cruz	0–1	Deportivo Español	Córdoba, Pcia. de Córdoba
16:00		Report	Villalba Fretes 70'	Stadium: Estadio Juan Domingo Perón; Referee: Pedro Argañaraz

18 March 2015	Banfield	1–0	Sol de América (F)	Formosa, Pcia. de Formosa
22:00	Bertolo 88'	Report		Stadium: Estadio Antonio Romero; Referee: Ariel Penel

13 May 2015	Rosario Central	3–1	Deportivo Riestra	Junín, Pcia. de Buenos Aires
17:10	Montoya 41'; Aguirre 47'; Niell 78' (pen.)	Report	Sánchez 75'	Stadium: Estadio Eva Perón; Referee: Andrés Merlos

=== Round of 32 ===
This round will have the 32 qualified teams from the Round of 64. The round was played between July 3 and August 12, in a single knock-out match format. The 16 winning teams advanced to the Round of 16.

3 July 2015	River Plate	0–2	Rosario Central	San Juan, Pcia. de San Juan
22:30		Report	Ruben 27' (pen.); Aguirre 89'	Stadium: Estadio del Bicentenario; Referee: Federico Beligoy

5 August 2015	Ferro Carril Oeste	3–3 (4–1 p)	Los Andes	Sarandí, Pcia. de Buenos Aires
15:00	Coll 48'; Salmerón 80'; Frontini 90+3'	Report	Vera 27'; Frontini 58' (o.g.); Lorefice 83'	Stadium: Estadio Julio Humberto Grondona; Referee: Sergio Pezzotta
	Penalties
	Salmerón (penalty scored); Bazán (penalty scored); Frontini (penalty scored); Aragón (penalty scored)		(penalty scored) Noriega; (penalty missed) Salinas; (penalty missed) Lorefice

30 July 2015	Quilmes	3–0	Independiente Rivadavia	Córdoba, Pcia. de Córdoba
17:30	Pérez Guedes 24 ', 60'; Canelo 43'	Report		Stadium: Estadio Juan Domingo Perón; Referee: Jorge Baliño

15 July 2015	San Martín (SJ)	1–1 (5–6 p)	Estudiantes (LP)	Córdoba, Pcia. de Córdoba
19:00	Gonzalez 42'	Report	Pereira 80'	Stadium: Estadio Juan Domingo Perón; Referee: Juan Pablo Pompei
	Penalties
	Ledesma (penalty scored); Fissore (penalty scored); Figueroa (penalty missed); Ardente (penalty scored); Capelli (penalty scored); Covea (penalty scored); Franco (penalty missed)		(penalty scored) Schunke; (penalty scored) Barbona; (penalty scored) Cerutti; (penalty missed) Mendoza; (penalty scored) Pereira; (penalty scored) Jara; (penalty scored) Gil Romero

7 August 2015	Racing	2–1	Tigre	San Juan, Pcia. de San Juan
21:10	Bou 7'; Grimi 38'	Report	Goñi 20'	Stadium: Estadio del Bicentenario; Referee: Patricio Loustau

12 August 2015	Atlanta	1–1 (7–6 p)	Comunicaciones	Parque Patricios, Buenos Aires
15:00	Pedrozo 57'	Report	Ibáñez 84'	Stadium: Tomás A. Ducó; Referee: Gastón Meineri
	Penalties
	Galeano (penalty scored); Silva (penalty scored); Quiroga (penalty scored); Mancinelli (penalty scored); Pedrozo (penalty scored); Palisi (penalty scored); Benítez (penalty scored)		(penalty scored) Vatter; (penalty scored) Barrionuevo; (penalty scored) Gibelli; (penalty scored) Castagno; (penalty scored) Martínez; (penalty scored) Estévez; (penalty missed) Cattaneo

10 August 2015	Atlético de Rafaela	5–1	Deportivo Merlo	San Francisco, Pcia. de Córdoba
17:30	Jominy 22'; Godoy 38'; Gironi 46' (o.g.); Orsini 67'; Ferreyra 69'	Report	Rodríguez 25'	Stadium: Estadio Oscar C.Boero; Referee: Nicolás Lamolina

5 August 2015	Instituto	1–2	San Lorenzo	San Juan, Pcia. de San Juan
19:15	Magnín 7'	Report	Más 56'; Cauteruccio 64'	Stadium: Estadio del Bicentenario; Referee: Saúl Laverni

7 August 2015	Independiente	1–0	Deportivo Español	Lanús, Pcia. de Buenos Aires
18:00	Vera 62'	Report		Stadium: Estadio Ciudad de Lanús; Referee: Pedro Argañaraz

6 August 2015	Lanús	3–0	Nueva Chicago	Parque Patricios, Buenos Aires
17:00	Gómez 6 ', 39'; González 51'	Report		Stadium: Tomás A. Ducó; Attendance: Diego Abal

15 July 2015	Unión	0–0 (5–6 p)	Gimnasia y Esgrima (LP)	Formosa, Pcia. de Formosa
21:10		Report		Stadium: Estadio Antonio Romero; Referee: Pedro Argañaraz
	Penalties
	Malcorra (penalty scored); Soldano (penalty scored); Martínez (penalty scored); Sánchez (penalty missed); Castro (penalty scored); Zurbriggen (penalty missed); García Guerreño (penalty missed); Cardozo (penalty scored); Affranchino (penalty missed)		(penalty missed) Fernández; (penalty scored) Meza; (penalty scored) Bonifacio; (penalty scored) Medina; (penalty scored) Mazzola; (penalty missed) Brum; (penalty missed) Mendoza; (penalty scored) Barsottini; (penalty scored) Coronel

12 August 2015	Acassuso	0–3	Vélez Sársfield	Córdoba, Pcia. de Córdoba
17:30		Report	Caraglio 6 ', 78'; Amor 51'	Stadium: Estadio Juan Domingo Perón; Referee: Yamil Possi

21 July 2015	Chacarita Juniors	2–1	All Boys	Sarandí, Pcia. de Buenos Aires
15:00	Achucarro 19' (pen.); Mariescurrena 58'	Report	Losa 31' (pen.)	Stadium: Estadio Julio Humberto Grondona; Referee: Sergio Pezzotta

6 August 2015	Temperley	1–1 (3–5 p)	Defensa y Justicia	Avellaneda, Greater Buenos Aires
19:30	Dinenno 45+2'	Report	Barbieri 83'	Stadium: Estadio Juan Domingo Perón; Referee: Fernando Espinoza
	Penalties
	Chimino (penalty scored); Bogino (penalty missed); Esparza (penalty scored); Brandán (penalty scored)		(penalty scored) Sánchez Sotelo; (penalty scored) Tellechea; (penalty scored) Rius; (penalty scored) Busse; (penalty scored) Barbieri

23 July 2015	Argentinos Juniors	0–1	Guaraní Antonio Franco	Temperley, Pcia. de Buenos Aires
18:00		Report	Ostrowski 70'	Stadium: Alfredo Beranger; Referee: Alejandro Castro

29 July 2015	Banfield	0–3	Boca Juniors	Formosa, Pcia. de Formosa
19:30		Report	Pérez 4'; Calleri 45'; Tevez 57'	Stadium: Estadio Antonio Romero; Referee: Darío Herrera

=== Round of 16 ===
This round will have the 16 qualified teams from the Round of 32. The round was played between August 19 and September 3, in a single knock-out match format. The 8 winning teams advanced to the Quarterfinals.

27 August 2015	Rosario Central	0–0 (5–3 p)	Ferro Carril Oeste	Parque Patricios, Buenos Aires
19:00		Report		Stadium: Tomás A. Ducó; Referee: Alejandro Castro
	Penalties
	Donatti (penalty scored); Pinola (penalty scored); Villagra (penalty scored); Domínguez (penalty scored); Ruben (penalty scored)		(penalty missed) Salmerón; (penalty scored) Bazán; (penalty scored) Frontini; (penalty scored) Achucarro

3 September 2015	Quilmes	1–1 (1–3 p)	Estudiantes (LP)	Lanús, Pcia. de Buenos Aires
19:00	Canelo 27'	Report	Auzqui 70'	Stadium: Estadio Ciudad de Lanús; Referee: Fernando Espinoza
	Penalties
	Gómez (penalty missed); Cabrera (penalty missed); Uglessich (penalty scored); Pérez Guedes (penalty missed)		(penalty scored) Schunke; (penalty missed) Barbona; (penalty scored) Cerutti; (penalty scored) Mendoza

26 August 2015	Racing	1–1 (4–2 p)	Atlanta	San Juan, Pcia. de San Juan
21:00	Pavone 52'	Report	Galeano 69' (pen.)	Stadium: Estadio del Bicentenario; Referee: Sergio Pezzotta
	Penalties
	Saja (penalty scored); Romero (penalty scored); Pillud (penalty scored); Lollo (penalty missed); Pavone (penalty scored)		(penalty missed) Galeano; (penalty scored) Silva; (penalty scored) Quiroga; (penalty missed) Bonfigli

26 August 2015	Atlético de Rafaela	0–1	San Lorenzo	Santa Fe, Pcia. de Santa Fe
18:30		Report	Cauteruccio 70'	Stadium: Estadio B.G. Estanislao López; Referee: Andrés Merlos

19 August 2015	Independiente	0–2	Lanús	La Plata, Pcia. de Buenos Aires
18:30		Report	Martínez 29'; Castellani 51'	Stadium: Estadio Único; Referee: Diego Abal

2 September 2015	Gimnasia y Esgrima (LP)	0–1	Vélez Sársfield	Córdoba, Pcia. de Córdoba
16:30		Report	Caraglio 80' (pen.)	Stadium: Estadio Presidente Perón; Referee: Pedro Argañaraz

20 August 2015	Chacarita Juniors	0–1	Defensa y Justicia	Sarandí, Pcia. de Buenos Aires
15:00		Report	Sánchez Sotelo 40'	Stadium: Estadio Julio Humberto Grondona; Referee: Luis Alvarez

19 August 2015	Guaraní Antonio Franco	0–4	Boca Juniors	San Juan, Pcia. de San Juan
21:00		Report	Gago 39'; Calleri 43'; Tevez 50' (pen.); Chávez 81' (pen.)	Stadium: Estadio del Bicentenario; Referee: Federico Beligoy

=== Quarterfinals ===
This round will have the 8 qualified teams from the Round of 16. The round was played between September 9 and September 23, in a single knock-out match format. The 4 winning teams advanced to the Semifinals.

23 September 2015	Rosario Central	2–1	Estudiantes (LP)	San Juan, Pcia. de San Juan
19:00	Fernández 69'; Ruben 74'	Report	Damonte 9'	Stadium: Estadio del Bicentenario; Referee: Jorge Baliño

17 September 2015	Racing	2–1	San Lorenzo	La Plata, Pcia. de Buenos Aires
20:10	Aued 76'; Bou 90' (pen.)	Report	Cauteruccio 41'	Stadium: Estadio Único; Referee: Diego Abal

9 September 2015	Lanús	1–1 (4–3 p)	Vélez Sársfield	Sarandí, Pcia. de Buenos Aires
19:00	González 32'	Report	Caraglio 89' (pen.)	Stadium: Estadio Julio Humberto Grondona
	Penalties
	Aguirre (penalty scored); Martínez (penalty scored); Velázquez (penalty scored); Gómez (penalty scored)		(penalty scored) Aguerre; (penalty scored) Nanni; (penalty missed) Delgadillo; (penalty missed) Cubero

23 September 2015	Defensa y Justicia	1–2	Boca Juniors	Córdoba, Pcia. de Córdoba
21:30	Bertocchi 68'	Report	Tevez 52'; Cubas 72'	Stadium: Estadio Mario Alberto Kempes; Referee: Fernando Rapallini

=== Semifinals ===
This round will have the 4 qualified teams from the Quarterfinals. The round was played on October 23, in a single knock-out match format. The 2 winning teams advanced to the Final.

23 October 2015	Rosario Central	1–0	Racing	Salta, Pcia. de Salta
21:30	Ruben 45'	Report		Stadium: Estadio Padre Ernesto Martearena; Referee: Federico Beligoy

23 October 2015	Lanús	0–2	Boca Juniors	San Juan, Pcia. de San Juan
19:00		Report	Lodeiro 14' (pen.); Tevez 31'	Stadium: Estadio del Bicentenario; Referee: Saúl Laverni

== Final ==
November 4, 2015
21:10

Rosario Central	0–2	Boca Juniors
	Report	Lodeiro 55' (pen.); Chávez 89'

Estadio Mario Alberto Kempes, Córdoba
Referee: Diego Ceballos

== Top goalscorers ==
Note: Players in bold are still active in the competition.

Rank	Player	Club	Goals
1	(Argentina) Luis Luna	Vélez Sarsfield (SR)	5
2	(Argentina) José Loncón	CAI	4
2	(Argentina) Cristian Alfaro	Mitre (S)	4
2	(Uruguay) Martín Cauteruccio	San Lorenzo	4
2	(Argentina) Milton Caraglio	Vélez Sársfield	4
2	(Argentina) Carlos Tevez	Boca Juniors	4
