= 2015 Torneo Federal A =

II Torneo Federal A
- Season: 2015
- Champions: Talleres (C) (2nd divisional title)
- Promoted: Talleres (C); Juventud Unida Universitario
- Relegated: Alianza (CC); Américo Tesorieri; Andino; CAI; Independiente (Ch); Textil Mandiyú; Tiro Federal (R); Vélez Sársfield (SR)
- Matches: 650
- Goals: 1,549 (2.38 per match)
- Top goalscorer: Adrián Toloza; David Romero; Gustavo Balvorín (18 goals)
- Biggest home win: Defensores de Belgrano (VR) 7-1 Unión (VK) (March 20); Unión (VK) 6-0 Gutiérrez SC (July 5); Alvarado 6-0 Alianza (CC) (October 11)
- Biggest away win: Textil Mandiyú 0-6 Sol de América (F) (March 29)
- Highest scoring: Américo Tesorieri 5-4 Concepción FC (August 30); Juventud Unida Universitario 5-4 Deportivo Madryn (November 23)
- All statistics correct as of December 10, 2015.

The 2015, was the 2º Torneo Federal A season since it became part of the third tier of the Argentine football league system. The tournament is reserved for teams indirectly affiliated to the Asociación del Fútbol Argentino (AFA), while teams affiliated to AFA have to play the Primera B Metropolitana, which is the other third tier competition. The champion will be promoted to Primera B Nacional. 40 teams competed. The regular season began on March 20 and ended on December 10.

== Format ==
=== First stage ===
The teams were divided into four zones with ten teams (a total of 40 teams) in each zone and it was played in a round-robin tournament. The teams placed 1º to 3º and the two best 4º team from the four zones qualified for the Second Stage.

=== Second Stage ===
==== Tetradecagonal Final ====
Consisted of fourteen (14) teams that qualified from the First Stage and the winner was declared champion and automatically promoted to the Primera B Nacional. It was played in a round-robin system. The teams placed 2º to 4º advanced directly to the Fifth Stage, while the teams placed 5º to 14º advanced to the Third Stage.

==== Reválida ====
The twenty six (26) teams that did not qualify for the Tetradecagonal Final were grouped into two zones of thirteen (13) teams. The teams placed 1º to 5º of both zones advanced to the Third Stage.

=== Third Stage ===
The teams placed 5º to 14º from the Tetradecagonal Final and the teams placed 1º to 5º of both zones of the Revalida Stage (20 teams) played against each other in a Double-elimination tournament. The 10 winning teams advanced to the Fourth Stage.

=== Fourth Stage ===
The 10 winning teams coming from the Third Stage played against each other in a Double-elimination tournament. The 5 winning teams advanced to the Fifth Stage.

=== Fifth Stage ===
The teams placed 2º to 4º in the Tetradecagonal Final and the 5 winning teams coming from the Fourth Stage played against each other in a Double-elimination tournament. The 4 winning teams advanced to the Fifth Stage.

=== Sixth Stage ===
The 4 winning teams coming from the Fifth Stage played against each other in a Double-elimination tournament. The 2 winning teams advanced to the Seventh Stage.

=== Seventh Stage ===
The 2 winning teams coming from the Fifth Stage played against each other in a Double-elimination tournament. The winning team was promoted to the Primera B Nacional.

=== Relegation ===
After the Revalida Stage a table was drawn up with the addition of points of the First Stage and Revalida Stage, the last four of both zones were relegated to Torneo Federal B.

== Club information ==
Locations of the 2015 season teams.
Blue: Zone 1; Yellow: Zone 2;
Green: Zone 3; Red: Zone 4.

=== Zone 1 ===
Team	City	Stadium
Alianza	Cutral Có	Coloso del Ruca Quimey
Alvarado	Mar del Plata	(None) ^{1}
CAI	Comodoro Rivadavia	Estadio Municipal
Cipolletti	Cipolletti	La Visera de Cemento
Deportivo Madryn	Puerto Madryn	Coliseo del Golfo
Deportivo Roca	General Roca	Luis Maiolino
Ferro Carril Oeste	General Pico	El Coloso del Barrio Talleres
General Belgrano	Santa Rosa	Nuevo Rancho Grande
Independiente	Neuquén	José Rosas y Perito Moreno
Tiro Federal	Bahía Blanca	Onofre Pirrone

^{1} Play their home games at Estadio José María Minella.

=== Zone 2 ===
Team	City	Stadium
9 de Julio	Morteros	La Villa de Los Deportes
Defensores de Belgrano	Villa Ramallo	Salomón Boeseldín
Deportivo Maipú	Maipú	Higinio Sperdutti
Gutiérrez	General Gutiérrez	General Gutiérrez
Independiente	Chivilcoy	Raúl Orlando Lungarzo
Juventud Unida Universitario	San Luis	Mario Diez
Sportivo Las Parejas	Las Parejas	Fortaleza del Lobo
Talleres	Córdoba	La Boutique
Tiro Federal	Rosario	Fortín de Ludueña
Unión	Villa Krause	12 de Octubre

=== Zone 3 ===
Team	City	Stadium
Chaco For Ever	Resistencia	Juan Alberto García
Gimnasia y Esgrima	Concepción del Uruguay	Manuel y Ramón Núñez
Libertad	Sunchales	Hogar de Los Tigres
Mitre	Santiago del Estero	Doctores José y Antonio Castiglione
Sarmiento	Resistencia	Centenario
Sol de América	Formosa	(None)^{1}
Sportivo Patria	Formosa	Antonio Romero
Textil Mandiyú	Corrientes	José Antonio Romero Feris
Unión	Sunchales	La Fortaleza
Vélez Sársfield	San Ramón	Juan Carlos Paz

^{1} Play their home games at Estadio Antonio Romero.

=== Zone 4 ===
Team	City	Stadium
Altos Hornos Zapla	Palpalá	Emilio Fabrizzi
Américo Tesorieri	La Rioja	Carlos Mercado Luna
Andino	La Rioja	Carlos Mercado Luna
Concepción	Concepción	Stewart Shipton
Gimnasia y Tiro	Salta	Gigante del Norte
Juventud Antoniana	Salta	Fray Honorato Pistoia
San Jorge	San Miguel de Tucumán	Senador Luis Cruz
San Lorenzo	Catamarca	Bicentenario Ciudad de Catamarca
San Martín	San Miguel de Tucumán	La Ciudadela
Unión Aconquija	Aconquija	Municipal de Aconquija

== First stage ==
=== Zone 1 ===
Pos	Team	Pld	W	D	L	GF	GA	GD	Pts	Qualification
1	Cipolletti	18	9	3	6	28	19	+9	30	Advance to Tetradecagonal
2	Deportivo Roca	18	8	5	5	29	20	+9	29	Advance to Tetradecagonal
3	Tiro Federal (BB)	18	8	5	5	28	21	+7	29	Advance to Tetradecagonal
4	Independiente (N)	18	8	5	5	27	23	+4	29	Advance to Revalida
5	Deportivo Madryn	18	9	2	7	25	22	+3	29	Advance to Revalida
6	Alvarado	18	7	6	5	22	16	+6	27	Advance to Revalida
7	Ferro Carril Oeste (GP)	18	6	8	4	30	20	+10	26	Advance to Revalida
8	General Belgrano	18	6	3	9	15	27	−12	21	Advance to Revalida
9	CAI	18	5	3	10	21	33	−12	18	Advance to Revalida
10	Alianza (CC)	18	3	2	13	18	42	−24	11	Advance to Revalida

Updated to match(es) played on July 20. Source: AFA
Rules for classification: 1) points; 2) head-to-head points; 3) goal difference; 4) goals scored; 5) head-to-head goal difference; 6) head-to-head goals scored.

==== Results ====
Home \ Away	ACC	ALV	CAI	CIP	DMA	DRO	FCO	GBE	INE	TIF
Alianza (CC)		0–1	4–2	1–0	2–1	0–3	2–2	2–3	2–3	2–3
Alvarado	3–0		3–1	1–1	1–1	0–1	0–1	1–2	1–0	0–0
CAI	3–1	2–1		4–1	2–1	1–0	0–2	1–2	2–3	0–1
Cipolletti	4–0	1–1	2–0		3–0	1–0	2–1	2–1	0–2	5–2
Deportivo Madryn	3–1	1–0	4–0	2–1		1–0	3–1	2–0	2–1	1–2
Deportivo Roca	2–0	2–3	2–2	1–0	2–2		3–2	3–0	3–1	2–1
Ferro Carril Oeste (GP)	5–0	1–1	1–1	1–2	1–0	1–1		4–0	1–1	4–2
General Belgrano	2–0	0–2	0–0	1–0	0–1	2–1	0–0		0–1	0–3
Independiente (N)	2–1	1–1	3–0	1–3	2–0	1–1	2–2	1–1		1–0
Tiro Federal (BB)	0–0	1–2	2–0	0–0	3–0	2–2	0–0	3–1	3–1	

Updated to match(es) played on July 20. Source: AFA
Legend: Blue = home team win; Yellow = draw; Red = away team win.

=== Zone 2 ===
Pos	Team	Pld	W	D	L	GF	GA	GD	Pts	Qualification
1	Talleres (C)	18	10	7	1	26	12	+14	37	Advance to Tetradecagonal
2	Defensores de Belgrano (VR)	18	8	6	4	26	15	+11	30	Advance to Tetradecagonal
3	Juventud Unida Universitario	18	7	8	3	19	13	+6	29	Advance to Tetradecagonal
4	Unión (VK)	18	7	4	7	25	26	−1	25	Advance to Revalida
5	Deportivo Maipú	18	6	6	6	18	14	+4	24	Advance to Revalida
6	9 de Julio (M)	18	6	5	7	19	20	−1	23	Advance to Revalida
7	Independiente (Ch)	18	5	8	5	16	18	−2	23	Advance to Revalida
8	Sportivo Las Parejas	18	6	3	9	22	29	−7	21	Advance to Revalida
9	Gutiérrez SC	18	5	4	9	20	26	−6	19	Advance to Revalida
10	Tiro Federal (R)	18	3	3	12	14	32	−18	12	Advance to Revalida

Updated to match(es) played on July 20. Source: AFA
Rules for classification: 1) points; 2) head-to-head points; 3) goal difference; 4) goals scored; 5) head-to-head goal difference; 6) head-to-head goals scored.

==== Results ====
Home \ Away	9JM	DEF	DEM	GSC	ICH	JUU	SLP	TAL	TFR	UVK
9 de Julio (M)		0–0	0–1	2–2	2–1	1–4	0–2	0–0	2–0	4–0
Defensores de Belgrano (VR)	2–1		0–0	1–0	3–1	0–0	2–0	1–3	4–0	7–1
Deportivo Maipú	2–1	0–1		0–0	1–1	0–1	3–0	0–1	3–0	2–0
Gutiérrez SC	1–2	1–2	2–0		1–0	2–0	2–2	1–2	1–0	1–2
Independiente (Ch)	0–0	1–0	0–0	1–0		0–0	2–0	0–0	1–0	2–1
Juventud Unida Universitario	0–0	3–0	0–0	2–1	1–1		2–1	1–1	1–0	0–0
Sportivo Las Parejas	0–2	2–1	3–2	1–3	1–1	2–1		1–2	2–1	0–0
Talleres (C)	2–0	0–0	0–1	1–1	4–1	2–2	2–0		2–1	1–1
Tiro Federal (R)	0–2	2–2	1–1	2–1	2–2	2–0	1–4	0–1		1–0
Unión (VK)	3–0	0–0	3–2	6–0	2–1	0–1	2–1	1–2	3–1	

Updated to match(es) played on July 20. Source: AFA
Legend: Blue = home team win; Yellow = draw; Red = away team win.

=== Zone 3 ===
Pos	Team	Pld	W	D	L	GF	GA	GD	Pts	Qualification
1	Sol de América (F)	18	11	2	5	33	23	+10	35	Advance to Tetradecagonal
2	Unión (S)	18	10	4	4	25	15	+10	34	Advance to Tetradecagonal
3	Mitre (SdE)	18	10	3	5	32	20	+12	33	Advance to Tetradecagonal
4	Chaco For Ever	18	8	7	3	24	16	+8	31	Advance to Tetradecagonal
5	Gimnasia y Esgrima (CdU)	18	8	5	5	22	18	+4	29	Advance to Revalida
6	Sportivo Patria	18	7	6	5	21	15	+6	27	Advance to Revalida
7	Sarmiento (R)	18	7	5	6	24	23	+1	26	Advance to Revalida
8	Libertad (S)	18	7	2	9	21	24	−3	23	Advance to Revalida
9	Vélez Sársfield (SR)	18	1	4	13	14	33	−19	7	Advance to Revalida
10	Textil Mandiyú	18	1	2	15	6	35	−29	5	Advance to Revalida

Updated to match(es) played on July 20. Source: AFA
Rules for classification: 1) points; 2) head-to-head points; 3) goal difference; 4) goals scored; 5) head-to-head goal difference; 6) head-to-head goals scored.

==== Results ====
Home \ Away	CFE	GYE	LIB	MIT	SAR	SOL	SPP	TEX	UNS	VSA
Chaco For Ever		3–1	1–0	2–3	1–1	2–1	1–1	0–0	3–0	3–1
Gimnasia y Esgrima (CdU)	0–1		2–0	2–0	1–1	3–1	2–0	1–0	0–0	2–0
Libertad (S)	3–1	4–0		1–3	0–1	1–1	1–0	1–0	1–0	2–1
Mitre (SdE)	0–0	1–1	2–1		1–1	6–2	0–1	2–0	1–2	3–1
Sarmiento (R)	0–1	0–2	1–0	1–5		1–2	1–1	2–0	1–1	1–0
Sol de América (F)	2–1	3–1	1–0	2–0	3–1		1–0	2–0	0–1	2–1
Sportivo Patria	1–1	1–1	5–0	0–1	3–2	1–2		2–0	1–0	1–0
Textil Mandiyú	0–1	1–2	1–1	0–2	0–5	0–6	0–1		1–2	3–0
Unión (S)	1–1	1–0	3–2	3–1	0–1	2–0	1–0	4–0		3–1
Vélez Sársfield (SR)	1–1	1–1	1–3	0–1	2–3	1–2	1–1	1–0	1–1	

Updated to match(es) played on July 20. Source: AFA
Legend: Blue = home team win; Yellow = draw; Red = away team win.

=== Zone 4 ===
Pos	Team	Pld	W	D	L	GF	GA	GD	Pts	Qualification
1	Juventud Antoniana	18	13	4	1	31	11	+20	43	Advance to Tetradecagonal
2	Unión Aconquija (Note: The match between Unión Aconquija and San Jorge (T) in the round 17 was awarded to Unión Aconquija a 1–0 win as a result of the lack of medical staff.)	18	10	6	2	23	8	+15	36	Advance to Tetradecagonal
3	San Martín (T) (Note: The match between San Martín (T) and Concepción FC in the round 1 was awarded to San Martín (T) a 1–0 win as a result of Concepción FC fielding two ineligible players. The match originally ended 1–1.)	18	10	6	2	28	16	+12	36	Advance to Tetradecagonal
4	Gimnasia y Tiro	18	10	3	5	19	13	+6	33	Advance to Tetradecagonal
5	Concepción FC	18	8	5	5	26	15	+11	29	Advance to Revalida
6	Altos Hornos Zapla	18	6	3	9	17	21	−4	21	Advance to Revalida
7	San Lorenzo (A)	18	4	7	7	22	23	−1	19	Advance to Revalida
8	San Jorge (T)	18	4	2	12	19	33	−14	14	Advance to Revalida
9	Andino	18	2	4	12	12	38	−26	10	Advance to Revalida
10	Américo Tesorieri	18	1	4	13	9	28	−19	7	Advance to Revalida

Updated to match(es) played on July 20. Source: AFA
Rules for classification: 1) points; 2) head-to-head points; 3) goal difference; 4) goals scored; 5) head-to-head goal difference; 6) head-to-head goals scored.

==== Results ====
Home \ Away	AHZ	ATE	AND	CFC	GYT	JUA	SJT	SLA	SMT	UAC
Altos Hornos Zapla		2–0	2–0	1–2	0–2	0–1	2–2	1–2	3–1	0–2
Américo Tesorieri	1–0		1–1	0–3	0–2	1–2	1–2	1–3	2–3	0–1
Andino	1–0	0–0		0–4	2–1	0–2	1–2	3–3	0–3	0–2
Concepción FC	0–1	0–0	1–1		1–0	2–1	3–1	0–0	1–1	1–2
Gimnasia y Tiro	1–0	1–0	2–1	3–1		0–1	2–1	1–0	0–2	0–0
Juventud Antoniana	1–1	2–1	4–0	2–0	0–0		2–1	3–2	2–0	1–0
San Jorge (T)	1–2	1–0	3–0	0–3	0–2	1–4		1–1	0–1	0–1
San Lorenzo (A)	1–2	1–1	3–0	0–2	1–1	0–1	2–1		1–2	1–1
San Martín (T)	0–0	2–0	2–1	1–0	3–0	1–1	4–2	1–1		1–1
Unión Aconquija	3–0	2–0	3–1	1–1	0–1	1–1	2–0	1–0	0–0	

Updated to match(es) played on July 20. Source: AFA
Legend: Blue = home team win; Yellow = draw; Red = away team win.

=== Ranking of fourth-placed teams ===
Pos	Grp	Team	Pld	W	D	L	GF	GA	GD	Pts	Result
1	4	Gimnasia y Tiro	18	10	3	5	19	13	+6	33	Advance to Tetradecagonal Final
2	3	Chaco For Ever	18	8	7	3	24	16	+8	31	Advance to Tetradecagonal Final
3	1	Independiente (N)	18	8	5	5	27	23	+4	29	
4	2	Unión (VK)	18	7	4	7	25	26	−1	25	

Updated to match(es) played on July 20. Source:
Rules for classification: 1) points; 2) play-off (only for deciding promotion or relegation); 3) goal difference; 4) goals scored; 5) head-to-head points; 6) head-to-head goal difference; 7) head-to-head goals scored.

== Second Stage ==
=== Tetradecagonal ===
Pos	Team	Pld	W	D	L	GF	GA	GD	Pts	Qualification
1	Talleres (C) (C, P)	13	9	4	0	22	8	+14	31	Promoted to Primera B Nacional
2	Defensores de Belgrano (VR)	13	9	1	3	23	10	+13	28	Advance to Fifth Stage
3	Juventud Unida Universitario	13	6	5	2	18	11	+7	23	Advance to Fifth Stage
4	Unión Aconquija	13	6	2	5	12	11	+1	20	Advance to Fifth Stage
5	Mitre (SdE)	13	5	4	4	9	9	0	19	Advance to Third Stage
6	Juventud Antoniana	13	4	5	4	12	11	+1	17	Advance to Third Stage
7	Unión (S)	13	5	2	6	15	17	−2	17	Advance to Third Stage
8	Chaco For Ever	13	4	4	5	18	16	+2	16	Advance to Third Stage
9	Gimnasia y Tiro	13	4	4	5	9	11	−2	16	Advance to Third Stage
10	Sol de América (F)	13	4	4	5	14	20	−6	16	Advance to Third Stage
11	Tiro Federal (BB)	13	4	3	6	16	22	−6	15	Advance to Third Stage
12	Cipolletti	13	4	1	8	14	18	−4	13	Advance to Third Stage
13	San Martín (T)	13	2	5	6	11	17	−6	11	Advance to Third Stage
14	Deportivo Roca	13	1	4	8	10	22	−12	7	Advance to Third Stage

Updated to match(es) played on October 28. Source: AFA
Rules for classification: 1) points; 2) play-off (only for deciding promotion or relegation); 3) goal difference; 4) goals scored; 5) head-to-head points; 6) head-to-head goal difference; 7) head-to-head goals scored.
(C) Champions; (P) Promoted

==== Results ====
Home \ Away	CFE	CIP	DEF	DRO	GYT	JUA	JUU	MIT	SMT	SOL	TAL	TIF	UAC	UNS
Chaco For Ever			0–1	3–0			1–1					2–2	4–1	2–0
Cipolletti	0–1				3–1	1–0		2–0	2–0	0–1	1–3			
Defensores de Belgrano		1–0		3–2			4–0		2–1	5–1		2–1		2–0
Deportivo Roca		1–1				1–1	0–2			1–1	0–2	4–1		
Gimnasia y Tiro	0–0		0–1	1–1				2–1					1–0	0–0
Juventud Antoniana	1–1		2–1		2–0			0–1	1–1				1–0	2–0
Juventud Unida Universitario		3–0			1–0	1–1				3–0	1–1	3–1		
Mitre (SdE)	2–1		1–0	1–0			0–1						0–0	2–0
San Martín (T)	2–1			2–0	0–2		1–1	1–1				1–2		
Sol de América (F)	3–1				1–2	2–1		0–0	1–1		0–1		3–1	
Talleres (C)	2–1		1–1		0–0	2–0		2–0	1–1				1–0	
Tiro Federal (BB)		2–1			1–0	0–0		0–0		3–0	2–4			
Unión Aconquija		2–1	1–0	1–0			0–0		1–0			3–0		2–0
Unión (S)		3–2		3–0			2–1		2–0	1–1	1–2	2–1		

Updated to match(es) played on October 28. Source: AFA
Legend: Blue = home team win; Yellow = draw; Red = away team win.

=== Revalida ===
==== Zone A ====
Pos	Team	Pld	W	D	L	GF	GA	GD	Pts	Qualification
1	Alvarado	12	6	5	1	23	11	+12	23	Advance to Third Stage
2	Sportivo Las Parejas	12	6	4	2	15	10	+5	22	Advance to Third Stage
3	9 de Julio (M)	12	6	2	4	15	10	+5	20	Advance to Third Stage
4	CAI (Note: CAI was ineligible for the Third Stage, as it was involved in relegation.)	12	5	4	3	14	7	+7	19	
5	Deportivo Madryn	12	5	4	3	15	9	+6	19	Advance to Third Stage
6	Deportivo Maipú	12	4	7	1	14	11	+3	19	Advance to Third Stage
7	Gutiérrez SC	12	4	6	2	13	8	+5	18	
8	General Belgrano	12	4	5	3	12	11	+1	17	
9	Tiro Federal (R)	12	4	3	5	9	12	−3	15	
10	Ferro Carril Oeste (GP)	12	3	5	4	15	17	−2	14	
11	Independiente (N)	12	3	5	4	9	13	−4	14	
12	Independiente (Ch) (Note: The match between Independiente (Ch) and Alianza (CC) in the round 12 of the Revalida was awarded to Independiente (Ch) a 1–0 win as a result of Alianza (CC) not travelling to Chivilcoy.)	12	2	1	9	4	15	−11	7	
13	Alianza (CC) (Note: Alianza (CC) was deducted 3 points as a result of not travelling to Chivilcoy in the round 12 of the Revalida.)	12	0	1	11	7	31	−24	−2	

Updated to match(es) played on October 28. Source: AFA
Rules for classification: 1) points; 2) play-off (only for deciding promotion or relegation); 3) goal difference; 4) goals scored; 5) head-to-head points; 6) head-to-head goal difference; 7) head-to-head goals scored.

===== Results =====
Home \ Away	9JM	ACC	ALV	CAI	DMA	DEM	FCO	GBE	GSC	ICH	INE	SLP	TFR
9 de Julio (M)		3–0	1–1	1–0					1–0	1–0		0–0	
Alianza (CC)				1–4	0–2				2–3		1–2	1–1	1–2
Alvarado		6–0		2–0	3–2				3–2	2–0		0–0	
CAI					1–0		4–0	1–0			0–0	0–0	2–0
Deportivo Madryn	3–0					2–0	1–1	2–2			1–1		1–0
Deportivo Maipú	2–1	3–1	1–1	2–2					0–0	1–0			
Ferro Carril Oeste (GP)	2–0	3–0	1–1			1–1		2–3		2–1			
General Belgrano	1–0	1–0	1–1			1–1			0–0	3–0			
Gutiérrez SC				0–0	1–1		3–1				2–0	2–0	0–0
Independiente (Ch)		1–0		1–0	0–1				0–0			0–2	0–1
Independiente (N)	0–1		2–1			1–1	0–0	1–1		2–1			
Sportivo Las Parejas					2–1	1–2	3–2	3–1			1–0		1–0
Tiro Federal (R)	0–5		1–2			0–0	0–0	2–0			3–0		

Updated to match(es) played on October 28. Source: AFA
Legend: Blue = home team win; Yellow = draw; Red = away team win.

==== Zone B ====
Pos	Team	Pld	W	D	L	GF	GA	GD	Pts	Qualification
1	Unión (VK)	12	6	3	3	21	10	+11	21	Advance to Third Stage
2	San Lorenzo (A)	12	5	6	1	15	7	+8	21	Advance to Third Stage
3	Gimnasia y Esgrima (CdU)	12	6	3	3	21	17	+4	21	Advance to Third Stage
4	Libertad (S)	12	6	3	3	18	15	+3	21	Advance to Third Stage
5	Concepción FC	12	5	4	3	19	12	+7	19	Advance to Third Stage
6	Sportivo Patria	12	4	4	4	18	16	+2	16	
7	Altos Hornos Zapla (Note: The match between Altos Hornos Zapla and Andino in the round 12 of the Revalida was awarded to Altos Hornos Zapla a 1–0 win as a result of Andino not travelling to Palpalá aducing economic difficulties.)	12	4	4	4	8	11	−3	16	
8	San Jorge (T)	12	4	3	5	16	15	+1	15	
9	Vélez Sársfield (SR)	12	4	3	5	13	16	−3	15	
10	Textil Mandiyú	12	4	3	5	15	20	−5	15	
11	Sarmiento (R)	12	2	5	5	14	15	−1	11	
12	Américo Tesorieri	12	3	2	7	19	33	−14	11	
13	Andino (Note: Andino was deducted 3 points as a result of not travelling to Palpalá in the round 12 of the Revalida.)	12	2	3	7	8	18	−10	6	

Updated to match(es) played on October 28. Source: AFA
Rules for classification: 1) points; 2) play-off (only for deciding promotion or relegation); 3) goal difference; 4) goals scored; 5) head-to-head points; 6) head-to-head goal difference; 7) head-to-head goals scored.

===== Results =====
Home \ Away	AHZ	ATE	AND	CFC	GYE	LIB	SJT	SLA	SAR	SPP	TEX	UVK	VSA
Altos Hornos Zapla		3–2	1–0			2–0		0–2		0–1		1–0	
Américo Tesorieri				5–4		2–3		0–3			2–1	1–1	2–1
Andino		2–1		1–1		1–0		0–0			2–2	1–3	
Concepción FC	0–0				1–1		2–0		3–0	4–2			0–0
Gimnasia y Esgrima (CdU)	4–0	2–2	2–1					0–0	4–2	3–1			
Libertad (S)				1–0	1–3		2–0				2–2	1–0	4–2
San Jorge (T)	1–1	5–2	2–0		4–0				1–0	0–0			
San Lorenzo (A)				1–0		1–2	1–1				1–0	1–1	4–2
Sarmiento (R)	0–0	5–0	3–0			0–0		1–1		1–1			
Sportivo Patria		3–0	2–0			2–2		0–0			3–1	2–3	
Textil Mandiyú	1–0			1–3	1–0		4–1		1–1				1–0
Unión (VK)				0–1	4–0		2–1		1–0		5–0		1–1
Vélez Sársfield (SR)	0–0		1–0		0–2		1–0		3–1	2–1			

Updated to match(es) played on October 28. Source: AFA
Legend: Blue = home team win; Yellow = draw; Red = away team win.

== Relegation ==
=== Zone A ===
Pos	Team	Pld	W	D	L	GF	GA	GD	Pts	Relegation
1	Alvarado	30	13	11	6	45	27	+18	50	
2	Deportivo Madryn	30	14	6	10	40	31	+9	48	
3	Deportivo Maipú	30	10	13	7	32	25	+7	43	
4	9 de Julio (M)	30	12	7	11	34	30	+4	43	
5	Independiente (N)	30	11	10	9	36	36	0	43	
6	Sportivo Las Parejas	30	12	7	11	37	39	−2	43	
7	Ferro Carril Oeste (GP)	30	9	13	8	45	37	+8	40	
8	General Belgrano	30	10	8	12	27	38	−11	38	
9	Gutiérrez SC	30	9	10	11	33	34	−1	37	Torneo Federal B relegation play-off
10	CAI (R)	30	10	7	13	35	40	−5	37	Torneo Federal B relegation play-off
11	Independiente (Ch) (R)	30	7	9	14	20	33	−13	30	Relegation to Torneo Federal B
12	Tiro Federal (R) (R)	30	7	6	17	23	44	−21	27	Relegation to Torneo Federal B
13	Alianza (CC) (Note: Alianza (CC) was deducted 3 points as a result of not travelling to Chivilcoy in the round 12 of the Revalida.) (R)	30	3	3	24	25	73	−48	9	Relegation to Torneo Federal B

Updated to match(es) played on October 28. Source: AFA
Rules for classification: 1) points; 2) head-to-head points; 3) goal difference; 4) goals scored; 5) head-to-head goal difference; 6) head-to-head goals scored.
(R) Relegated

==== Torneo Federal B relegation play-off ====
Team 1	Score	Team 2
CAI	1–1 (3–4 p)	Gutiérrez SC

=== Zone B ===
Pos	Team	Pld	W	D	L	GF	GA	GD	Pts	Relegation
1	Gimnasia y Esgrima (CdU)	30	14	8	8	43	35	+8	50	
2	Concepción FC	30	13	9	8	45	27	+18	48	
3	Unión (VK)	30	13	7	10	46	36	+10	46	
4	Libertad (S)	30	13	5	12	39	39	0	44	
5	Sportivo Patria	30	11	10	9	39	31	+8	43	
6	San Lorenzo (A)	30	9	13	8	37	30	+7	40	
7	Sarmiento (R)	30	9	10	11	38	38	0	37	
8	Altos Hornos Zapla	30	10	7	13	25	32	−7	37	
9	San Jorge (T)	30	8	5	17	35	48	−13	29	
10	Vélez Sársfield (SR) (R)	30	5	7	18	27	49	−22	22	Relegation to Torneo Federal B
11	Textil Mandiyú (R)	30	5	5	20	21	55	−34	20	Relegation to Torneo Federal B
12	Andino (Note: Andino was deducted 3 points as a result of not travelling to Palpalá in the round 12 of the Revalida.) (R)	30	4	7	19	20	56	−36	16	Relegation to Torneo Federal B
13	Américo Tesorieri (R)	30	4	6	20	28	61	−33	18	Relegation to Torneo Federal B

Updated to match(es) played on October 28. Source: AFA
Rules for classification: 1) points; 2) head-to-head points; 3) goal difference; 4) goals scored; 5) head-to-head goal difference; 6) head-to-head goals scored.
(R) Relegated

== Third to Seventh Stage ==
Pos	Team	Pld	W	D	L	GF	GA	GD	Pts	Qualification
1	Defensores de Belgrano (VR)	13	9	1	3	23	10	+13	28	Qualified from Tetradecagonal to Fifth Stage
2	Juventud Unida Universitario	13	6	5	2	18	11	+7	23	Qualified from Tetradecagonal to Fifth Stage
3	Unión Aconquija	13	6	2	5	12	11	+1	20	Qualified from Tetradecagonal to Fifth Stage
4	Mitre (SdE)	13	5	4	4	9	9	0	19	Qualified from Tetradecagonal to Third Stage
5	Juventud Antoniana	13	4	5	4	12	11	+1	17	Qualified from Tetradecagonal to Third Stage
6	Unión (S)	13	5	2	6	15	17	−2	17	Qualified from Tetradecagonal to Third Stage
7	Chaco For Ever	13	4	4	5	18	16	+2	16	Qualified from Tetradecagonal to Third Stage
8	Gimnasia y Tiro	13	4	4	5	9	11	−2	16	Qualified from Tetradecagonal to Third Stage
9	Sol de América (F)	13	4	4	5	14	20	−6	16	Qualified from Tetradecagonal to Third Stage
10	Tiro Federal (BB)	13	4	3	6	16	22	−6	15	Qualified from Tetradecagonal to Third Stage
11	Cipolletti	13	4	1	8	14	18	−4	13	Qualified from Tetradecagonal to Third Stage
12	San Martín (T)	13	2	5	6	11	17	−6	11	Qualified from Tetradecagonal to Third Stage
13	Deportivo Roca	13	1	4	8	10	22	−12	7	Qualified from Tetradecagonal to Third Stage
14	Alvarado	30	13	11	6	45	27	+18	50	Qualified from Revalida to Third Stage
15	Gimnasia y Esgrima (CdU)	30	14	8	8	43	35	+8	50	Qualified from Revalida to Third Stage
16	Concepción FC	30	13	9	8	45	27	+18	48	Qualified from Revalida to Third Stage
17	Deportivo Madryn	30	14	6	10	40	31	+9	48	Qualified from Revalida to Third Stage
18	Unión (VK)	30	13	7	10	46	36	+10	46	Qualified from Revalida to Third Stage
19	Libertad (S)	30	13	5	12	39	39	0	44	Qualified from Revalida to Third Stage
20	Deportivo Maipú	30	10	13	7	32	25	+7	43	Qualified from Revalida to Third Stage
21	9 de Julio (M)	30	12	7	11	34	30	+4	43	Qualified from Revalida to Third Stage
22	Sportivo Las Parejas	30	12	7	11	37	39	−2	43	Qualified from Revalida to Third Stage
23	San Lorenzo (A)	30	9	13	8	37	30	+7	40	Qualified from Revalida to Third Stage

Updated to match(es) played on unknown. Source:

=== Third Stage ===
Team 1	Agg.	Team 2	1st leg	2nd leg
Mitre (SdE)	2–3	San Lorenzo (A)	0–1	2–2
Juventud Antoniana	1–1	Sportivo Las Parejas	1–1	0–0
Unión (S)	2–0	9 de Julio (M)	2–0	0–0
Chaco For Ever	3–1	Deportivo Maipú	1–1	2–0
Gimnasia y Tiro	0–0	Libertad (S)	0–0	0–0
Sol de América (F)	2–3	Unión (VK)	0–1	2–2
Tiro Federal (BB)	2–4	Deportivo Madryn	1–2	1–2
Cipolletti	2–1	Concepción FC	2–1	0–0
San Martín (T)	2–2	Gimnasia y Esgrima (CdU)	2–1	0–1
Deportivo Roca	0–3	Alvarado	0–1	0–2

=== Fourth Stage ===
Team 1	Agg.	Team 2	1st leg	2nd leg
Juventud Antoniana	1–2	San Lorenzo (A)	0–1	1–1
Unión (S)	4–3	Unión (VK)	3–0	1–3
Chaco For Ever	0–6	Deportivo Madryn	0–3	0–3
Gimnasia y Tiro	2–0	Alvarado	0–0	2–0
Cipolletti	2–2	San Martín (T)	0–1	2–1

=== Fifth Stage ===
Team 1	Agg.	Team 2	1st leg	2nd leg
Defensores de Belgrano (VR)	5–2	San Lorenzo (A)	2–1	3–1
Juventud Unida Universitario	7–7	Deportivo Madryn	2–3	5–4
Unión Aconquija	3–2	Cipolletti	1–2	2–0
Unión (S)	2–1	Gimnasia y Tiro	0–1	2–0

=== Sixth Stage ===
Team 1	Agg.	Team 2	1st leg	2nd leg
Defensores de Belgrano (VR)	2–4	Unión (S)	1–1	1–3
Juventud Unida Universitario	1–1	Unión Aconquija	1–0	0–1

=== Seventh Stage ===
Team 1	Agg.	Team 2	1st leg	2nd leg
Juventud Unida Universitario	3–1	Unión (S)	1–1	2–0

== Season statistics ==
=== Top scorers ===
Rank	Player	Club	Goals
1	(Argentina) Adrián Toloza	Mitre (SdE)	18
1	(Argentina) David Romero	San Lorenzo (A)	18
1	(Argentina) Gustavo Balvorín	Juventud Antoniana	18
2	(Argentina) Luis Rivero	Libertad (S)	17
2	(Argentina) José Michelena	Deportivo Madryn	17
3	(Argentina) Germán Lessman	Defensores de Belgrano (VR)	16
4	(Argentina) Martín Prost	Gimnasia y Esgrima (CdU)	15
5	(Israel) Eial Strahman	Talleres (C)	14
5	(Argentina) Joaquín Molina	Unión (S)	14

== See also ==
- 2015 Primera B Nacional
- 2014–15 Copa Argentina
