= Club Atlético Unión =

Club Atlético Unión may refer to:

- Unión Santiago
- Unión de Mar del Plata
- Unión de Santa Fe
- Unión de Sunchales
