= Loncón =

Loncón and Loncon is a Mapuche surname found in present-day Chile and Argentina. Notable people with the surname include:

- Elisa Loncón (born 1963), Chilean Mapuche linguist
- José Loncón (born 1988), Argentine footballer
