= Club Atlético Vélez Sarsfield (San Ramón) =

Vélez Sarsfield (San Ramón)
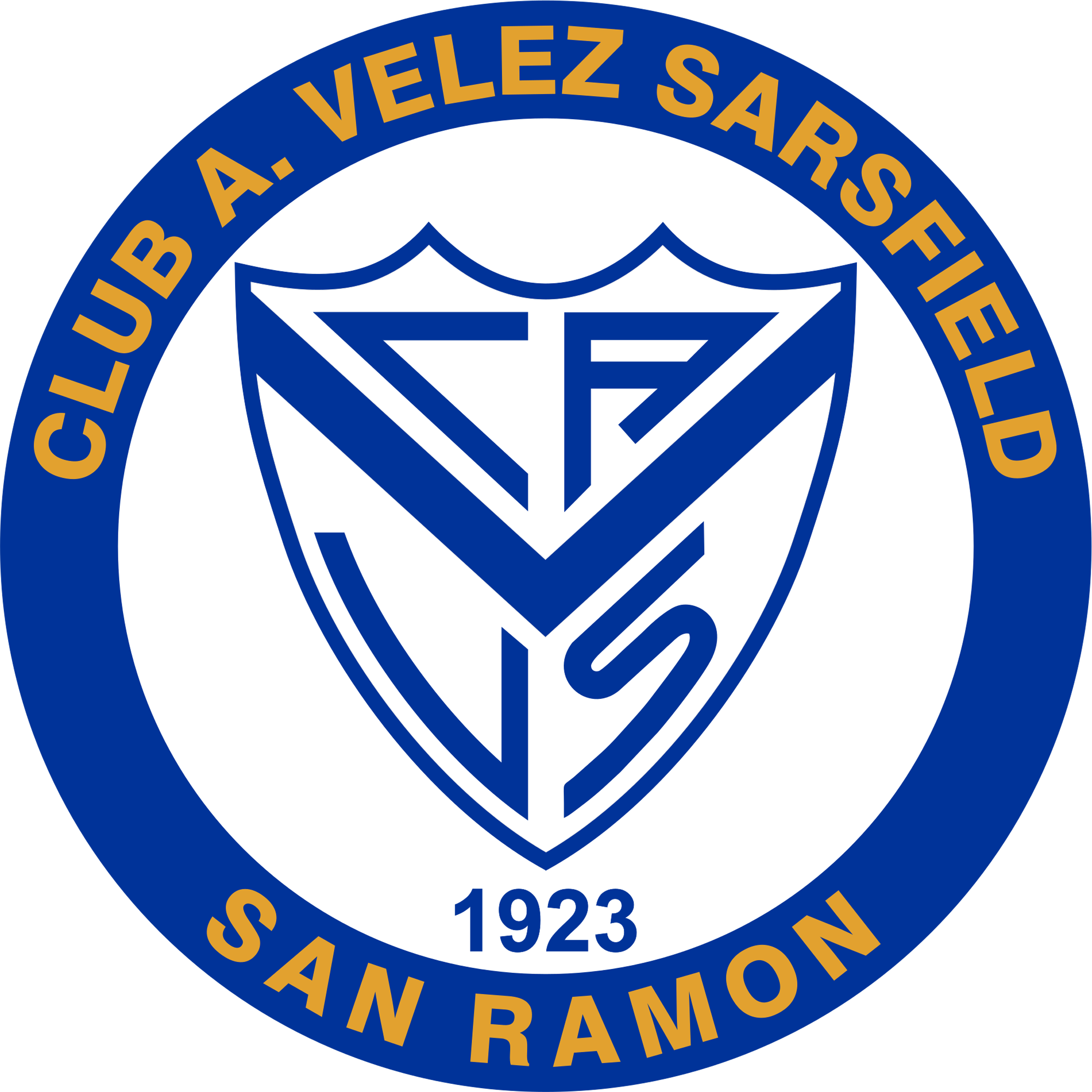
- Full name: Club Atlético Vélez Sarsfield
- Nickname: El fortín
- Founded: 28 August 1923; 102 years ago
- Ground: Juan Carlos Paz
- Capacity: 2,500
- President: Carlos Víctor Paz
- Coach: Jorge Llapur
- League: Torneo Regional Federal Amateur
- 2023-24: Second phase (Central Region)
| Home colours | Away colours |

Club Atlético Vélez Sarsfield de San Ramón, commonly known as simply Vélez de San Ramón, is a professional football club from San Ramón, province of Santiago del Estero, Argentina. They participate in the Liga Santiagueña de Fútbol and the Torneo Regional Federal Amateur. The club was founded on August 28, 1923.

== History ==
=== Founding ===
Vélez Sarsfield San Ramón was founded on August 28, 1923. Among its founders was Francisco Dominguez, the uncle of Juan Carlos Paz, the club's current president. The family's connection to the club runs deep: Paz's grandmother, María Dominguez, once served as president, as did his father, also named Carlos Paz.

=== Early years ===
In its early years, Vélez Sarsfield San Ramón competed in the now-defunct Liga Bandeña before joining the Cultural Football League. Eventually, under its current name, the club became part of what is now known as the Santiagueña Football League.

In 2008, Vélez achieved promotion to the First Division of the Liga Santiagueña de Fútbol (LSF) by finishing an undefeated campaign in First Division B. Two years later, the club made its debut in official AFA tournaments, participating for the first time in a national competition: the Torneo del Interior 2010.

=== Promotion to the Torneo Federal A ▲ ===
On February 15, 2015, Vélez defeated Club Libertad de Concordia (Entre Ríos) 2–1 on aggregate in one of the finals of the 2014 Torneo Federal B, securing promotion to the Torneo Federal A for the following season. That same year, the club also captured its first Liga Santiagueña title by winning the Copa Santiago, defeating Independiente de Fernández in the final.

During that season, one of its players gained national recognition: forward Luis Luna became the top scorer of the 2014–15 Copa Argentina, earning a place in the tournament's history.

=== Relegation to the Torneo Federal B ▼ ===
Vélez de San Ramón was relegated after a 4–2 loss to Libertad de Sunchales in Round 11 of the Torneo Federal A revalidation phase. As a result, the club was relegated and competed in the Torneo Federal B the following year.

=== Torneo Regional Federal Amateur ===
In 2019, Vélez began participating in the newly formed Torneo Regional Federal Amateur. That same year, the club enjoyed significant local success, winning three titles in the Santiagueña League: the Copa Santiago, the Annual Tournament, and the ReCopa Santiago Winners.

== Club details ==
Total de temporadas en AFA: 12

- Seasons in first division: 0
- Seasons in second division: 0
- Seasons in third division: 1
  - Torneo Federal A: 1 (2015)
- Seasons in fourth division: 9
  - Torneo Federal B: 3 (2014, 2016 - 2017)
  - Torneo Regional Federal Amateur: 6 (2019, 2020, 2020/21, 2021/22, 2022/23, 2023/24)
- Seasons in fifth division: 2
  - Torneo del interior: 2 (2010, 2011)
- Participations in national cups: 1
  - Copa Argentina: 1 (2014-15)

== Achievements ==
=== Regional tournaments ===
- Liga Santiagueña de Fútbol (4):
  - Torneo Annual: (2015, 2019).
  - Copa Santiago: (2019).
  - Recopa Santiago: (2019).

=== National tournaments ===
- Argentine Football Association (1):
  - Winner of the fourth promotion to 2015 Torneo Federal A.
