= Club Atlético Unión Santiago =

Unión Santiago
- Full name: Club Atlético Unión Santiago
- Nickname: El Tricolor
- Founded: 19 December 1982; 43 years ago
- Ground: Roberto Osvaldo Molinari
- Capacity: 7,500
- President: Gerardo Montenegro
- Coach: Carlos Acuña
- League: Torneo Regional Federal Amateur
- 2023-24: Third round (Central Region)
- Website: caunionsantiago.com
Home colours

Club Atlético Unión Santiago, mostly known as Unión Santiago or by its acronym CAUS, is a sports entity of the city of Santiago del Estero, Argentina. It was founded on December 19, 1982. Its main activity is soccer. He currently participates in the Liga Santiagueña de Fútbol tournaments and in the Torneo Regional Federal Amateur, the fourth category of football from Argentina.

Carlos Horacio Tragant served as the club’s first president and was succeeded by his son, Carlos Ricardo Tragant. The club won its first local title in 1983 and has since secured 21 Liga Santiagueña de Fútbol championships.[2][6]

Previously, in terms of national competition, he had 3 participations in the Copa Argentina from the 2013-14 season until the 2015-16, in the Torneo Federal C and Torneo Federal B which merged to form the Torneo Regional Federal Amateur where he currently participates and was also in the Torneo Argentino A where he only participated in 2 seasons.

Players of caliber such as Luis Adolfo Galván (World Champion in 1978), "Chango" Cárdenas passed through their ranks. (champion with Racing Club in the Copa Libertadores 1967 and the Copa Intercontinental 1967), Blas Mario Cano, Carlos Marcelo Almaraz, "Zorro" Martínez, Omar Orellano, Roger "Pinino" Gerez, "Puma" Rodríguez, Daniel "Talón" Juárez, César Coronel, "Pulga" and Ricardo Sily and "Petaco" Fernández, Joaquín “faraón” Uequin among others.

== History ==
=== The origin and foundation of Unión Santiago ===
The club emerged at the end of 1982 through the merger of the institutions of Club Atlético Santiago and Club Atlético Unión, which also provided the colors red (of Atlético Santiago), blue and white (of Atlético Unión) to the shield. The relegation of Santiago to the Second Division of the Liga Santiagueña de Fútbol led to the initiative to unify both to achieve better performance.

=== First Championships ===
In 1983 he won his first title in the Annual Tournament of the Santiagueña League and went down in history.

=== Promotion to Torneo Argentino A ===
He achieved promotion to the Torneo Argentino A in 1995-96 and was very close to being promoted to the Primera B Nacional on two occasions, in the 90s, where He was considered the most successful, but during the season tournament 1996-97 relegated to Torneo Argentino B.

=== Relegation to Torneo Argentino B ===
After being relegated, he went on to play in the 1999-00 season of the tournament.

=== Torneo Federal B 2015 ===
Unión Santiago lost in the neighboring province of Tucumán, where they lost 2 to 1 against Concepción FC in the first leg of one of the semifinals of the Torneo Federal B.

=== Torneo Anual 2023 ===
On October 9, 2023, he became champion of the Gold Cup of the Annual “World Champions 2022” First Division Tournament organized by Liga Santiagueña de Fútbol and qualified for the 2023-24 Torneo Regional Federal Amateur.

=== Torneo Anual 2024 ===
On September 22, 2024, Unión Santiago became champion of the Annual Tournament “Expreso Lo Bruno” of the Liga Santiagueña de Fútbol for the second consecutive time by defeating Vélez de San Ramón by 2-1 (aggregate 3-1), and qualified for the Torneo Regional Federal Amateur 2024-25.

== Facilities ==
The stadium, which belonged to the extinct Club Atlético Unión, called Roberto "Tito" Molinari, is located on Rivadavia Avenue, a few meters from the San Francisco Solano bridge, which crosses the Río Dulce and connects the city of Santiago del Estero with La Banda. Its capacity is approximately 7,500 people.

== Rivalries ==
Its main rival is the Club Atlético Güemes, also from the same city with whom it competes in the Santiagueño classic.

Total seasons in AFA: 26

- Seasons in first division: 0
- Seasons in second division: 0
- Seasons in third division: 6
  - Torneo del Interior: 4 (1988–89, 1991–92, 1992–93, 1994-95)
  - Torneo Argentino A: 2 (1995-96, 1996-97)
- Seasons in fourth division: 13
  - Torneo Argentino B: 2 (1999-00, 2013–14)
  - Torneo Federal B: 5 (2014, 2015, 2016 , 2016 (complementary), 2017)
  - Torneo Regional Federal Amateur: 6 (2019, 2020, 2021–22, 2022–23, 2023–24, 2024–25)
- Seasons in fifth division: 7
  - Torneo Argentino C: 7 (2006, 2007, 2008, 2009, 2011, 2012, 2013)
- Participations in National cups: 3
  - Copa Argentina: 3 (2013-14, 2014-15, 2015-16)

== Palmares ==
Total titles in the LSF: 21

- Torneo Anual: 9 (1983, 1988, 1991, 1992, 1994, 2008, 2012, 2023 and 2024)
- Torneo Representación: 3 (1992, 1995 and 1999)
- Torneo Apertura: 4 (1988, 1989, 1991 and 1999)
- Torneo Clausura: 1 (1994)
- Torneo Preparación: 1 (2008)
- Liguilla Clasificatoria: 3 (1991, 1994 and 2005)
