= Viale, Entre Ríos =

Viale
- Town
- Location of Viale in Argentina
- Coordinates: 31°52′S 60°01′W
- Country: Argentina
- Province: Entre Ríos
- Department: Paraná

Government
  - Mayor: Sergio Raúl Schmunck (Justicialist Party)

Population
  - Total: 8,939
- Time zone: UTC−3 (ART)
- CPA base: E3109
- Dialing code: +54 343

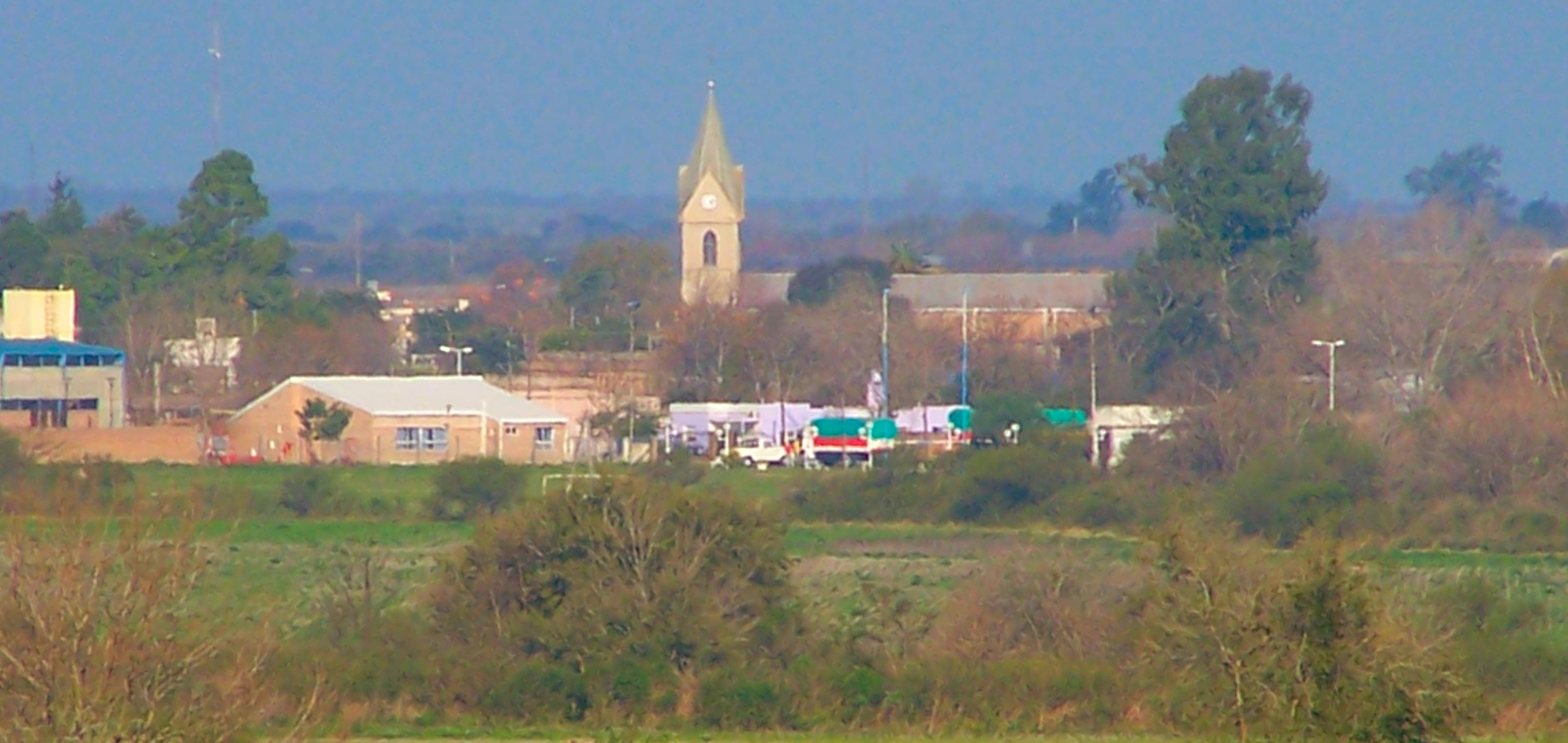

Viale is a town in the west of the province of Entre Ríos, Argentina. It is located about 50 km east from the provincial capital Paraná.
