= Gastón Losa =

Argentine footballer

Personal information
- Full name: Gastón Rodrigo Losa
- Date of birth: August 20, 1977 (age 49)
- Place of birth: La Plata, Argentina
- Height: 1.86 m (6 ft 1 in)
- Position: Goalkeeper

Senior career*
Years	Team	Apps	(Gls)
1997–1998	Temperley	17	(0)
2001–2003	Los Andes	49	(0)
2003–2004	Gimnasia de Mendoza	10	(0)
2004–2005	Independiente Rivadavia	2	(0)
2005–2006	Deportivo Español	44	(0)
2007–2010	La Serena	113	(9)
2010–2013	Almirante Brown	55	(0)
2013–2014	Ferro Carril Oeste	32	(0)
2014–2015	Tristán Suárez	6	(0)
2015–2017	All Boys	78	(0)
2018	Deportivo Español	13	(0)
- * Club domestic league appearances and goals

Gastón Rodrigo Losa (born August 20, 1977) is an Argentinian retired football goalkeeper

== Career ==
Losa played three years in Chile for Deportes La Serena.
