= Emmanuel Perea =

Argentine footballer (born 1985)

Personal information
- Full name: Juan Emmanuel Perea
- Date of birth: 8 April 1985 (age 41)
- Place of birth: San Miguel de Tucumán, Argentina
- Height: 1.80 m (5 ft 11 in)
- Position: Midfielder

Youth career
- Argentinos del Norte
- All Boys Tucumán

Senior career*
Years	Team	Apps	(Gls)
2003–2004	All Boys Tucumán	–	(–)
2004	Villa Paulina	1	(0)
2006	General Güemes	20	(3)
2006–2007	Almirante Brown	29	(0)
2007–2008	San Martín Tucumán	14	(0)
2008	Santiago Wanderers	17	(1)
2009–2013	All Boys	93	(8)
2013	Junior	0	(0)
2014	Boca Unidos	24	(1)
2015	All Boys	30	(0)
2016	San Jorge	8	(1)
2016–2017	San Lorenzo de Alem	18	(1)
2017–2018	Almagro	5	(0)
2018–2019	San Lorenzo de Alem	18	(1)
Total		277	(16)

Managerial career
- All Boys
- * Club domestic league appearances and goals

Juan Emmanuel Perea (born April 8, 1985), known as Emmanuel Perea, is an Argentine former footballer who played as a midfielder.

== Teams ==
- (Argentina) All Boys de Tucumán 2003–2004
- (Argentina) Villa Paulina 2004
- (Argentina) General Güemes 2006
- (Argentina) Almirante Brown 2006–2007
- (Argentina) San Martín de Tucumán 2007–2008
- (Chile) Santiago Wanderers 2008
- (Argentina) All Boys 2009–2013
- (Colombia) Junior 2013
- (Argentina) Boca Unidos 2014
- (Argentina) All Boys 2015
- (Argentina) San Jorge de Tucumán 2016
- (Argentina) San Lorenzo de Alem 2016–2017
- (Argentina) Almagro 2017–2018
- (Argentina) San Lorenzo de Alem 2018–2019

== Coach ==
- All Boys

== Personal life ==
His brothers Franco and Facundo played football for Villa Mitre de Tafí Viejo and Deportivo Morón, respectively.

== Titles ==
- San Martín de Tucumán 2007-2008 (Primera B Nacional Championship)
