= Fernando Lorefice =

Argentine footballer

Fernando Julio de las Soretas Lorefice
Personal information
- Full name: Fernando Adrián Lorefice
- Date of birth: 12 May 1983 (age 43)
- Place of birth: Quilmes, Argentina
- Position: Midfielder

Team information
- Current team: Ituzaingó

Youth career
- Independiente

Senior career*
Years	Team	Apps	(Gls)
2004–2006	Independiente	31	(0)
2005–2006	→ Maccabi Haifa (loan)	39	(2)
2006	Morelia "B"		
2007	Defensa y Justicia	11	(0)
2008	Skoda Xanthi	35	(2)
2009–2011	Defensa y Justicia	58	(1)
2011–2012	Atlanta	28	(1)
2012–2013	Deportivo Merlo	37	(1)
2013–2015	Los Andes	65	(8)
2016–2017	Platense	47	(0)
2017–2019	Tristán Suárez	55	(1)
2019–	Ituzaingó	6	(0)
- * Club domestic league appearances and goals as of 16:21, 6 February 2020 (UTC)

Fernando Lorefice (born May 12, 1983) is an Argentine footballer who plays for Club Atlético Ituzaingó.

== Career ==
Lorefice began his playing career with Independiente where he played 31 games in the Primera División Argentina. He has also played for Maccabi Haifa of Israel, Morelia "B" of Mexico, Skoda Xanthi of Greece, Defensa y Justicia and his current club Atlanta of the Argentine 2nd division.
