= Alejandro Noriega =

Argentine footballer

Personal information
- Full name: Alejandro Damián Noriega
- Date of birth: 9 August 1984 (age 42)
- Place of birth: Cañuelas, Buenos Aires, Argentina
- Height: 1.88 m (6 ft 2 in)
- Position: Striker

Team information
- Current team: Real Pilar

Senior career*
Years	Team	Apps	(Gls)
2001–2004	Cañuelas	75	(13)
2005–2006	Tigre	26	(2)
2006–2007	San Telmo	35	(3)
2007–2008	Flandria	39	(14)
2008	Estudiantes BA	19	(5)
2009–2010	Tristán Suárez	32	(4)
2010–2011	Flandria	30	(6)
2011	Defensores de Belgrano	15	(2)
2012	Deportes Concepción	12	(3)
2012–2013	Colegiales	30	(9)
2013–2015	Los Andes	91	(34)
2016	Gimnasia de Jujuy	34	(4)
2017	Douglas Haig	17	(2)
2017–2018	UAI Urquiza	22	(2)
2018–2019	San Miguel	34	(9)
2019–2021	Los Andes	28	(5)
2021	Talleres RdE	27	(3)
2022	Sportivo Italiano	33	(6)
2023	Fénix	10	(1)
2023	Sportivo Italiano	19	(6)
2024	Real Pilar	42	(11)
- * Club domestic league appearances and goals as of 21 December 2024

Alejandro Damián Noriega (born 9 August 1984) is an Argentine professional association footballer who plays as a striker for Real Pilar.

== Teams ==
- (Argentina) Cañuelas 2001–2004
- (Argentina) Tigre 2005–2006
- (Argentina) San Telmo 2006–2007
- (Argentina) Flandria 2007–2008
- (Argentina) Estudiantes de Buenos Aires 2008
- (Argentina) Tristán Suárez 2009–2010
- (Argentina) Flandria 2010–2011
- (Argentina) Defensores de Belgrano 2011
- (Chile) Deportes Concepción 2012
- (Argentina) Colegiales 2012–2013
- (Argentina) Los Andes 2013–2015
- (Argentina) Gimnasia y Esgrima de Jujuy 2016
- (Argentina) Douglas Haig 2017
- (Argentina) UAI Urquiza 2017–2018
- (Argentina) San Miguel 2018–2019
- (Argentina) Los Andes 2019–2021
- (Argentina) Talleres de Remedios de Escalada 2021
- (Argentina) Sportivo Italiano 2022
- (Argentina) Fénix 2023
- (Argentina) Sportivo Italiano 2023
- (Argentina) Real Pilar 2024–Present
