= La Mendieta =

Coordinates: 24°19′S 64°58′W

- Municipality and town
- Interactive map of La Mendieta
- Country: Argentina
- Province: Jujuy Province
- Time zone: UTC−3 (ART)

La Mendieta is a town and municipality in Jujuy Province in Argentina.
