= Javier Soñer =

Argentine footballer

Personal information
- Full name: Javier Walter Soñer
- Date of birth: 19 March 1995 (age 31)
- Place of birth: Curuzú Cuatiá, Argentina
- Height: 1.74 m (5 ft 9 in)
- Position: Centre forward

Team information
- Current team: Colegiales

Youth career
- –2013: All Boys

Senior career*
Years	Team	Apps	(Gls)
2012–2014	All Boys	4	(0)
2014–2015	Olimpo	0	(0)
2016–	Colegiales	7	(0)
- * Club domestic league appearances and goals as of 1 November 2017

Javier Soñer (born 19 March 1995) is an Argentine footballer who plays as a centre forward for Olimpo.
