= José Loncón =

Argentine footballer

Personal information
- Full name: José Raúl Loncón
- Date of birth: 4 June 1988 (age 38)
- Place of birth: Comodoro Rivadavia, Argentina
- Height: 1.70 m (5 ft 7 in)
- Position: Midfielder

Senior career*
Years	Team	Apps	(Gls)
2003	Ferrocarril del Estado		
2004–2005	Jorge Newbery (CR)		
2006–2012	CAI	94	(15)
2012–2013	Racing de Olavarría	33	(10)
2013–2014	Curicó Unido	26	(3)
2014	CAI	15	(3)
2015–2016	Colegiales	36	(7)
2016	Jorge Newbery (CR)		
2017	Ñublense	19	(1)
2018	Jorge Newbery (CR)		
2019	Pacífico de Neuquén	10	(6)
2020–2021	Jorge Newbery (CR)		
2021–2022	Petroquímica CR		
2022	Florentino Ameghino		
- * Club domestic league appearances and goals

José Raúl Loncón (born 4 June 1988) is an Argentine footballer who plays as a midfielder.

== Personal life ==
Loncón is of Mapuche descent.
