= La Dársena =

Coordinates: 27°42′S 64°18′W

- Municipality and village
- Interactive map of La Dársena
- Country: Argentina
- Province: Santiago del Estero
- Time zone: UTC−3 (ART)

La Dársena is a municipality and village in Santiago del Estero in Argentina.
