= 2019–20 Independiente Rivadavia season =

Association football season

Independiente Rivadavia
2019–20 season
- President: Ignacio Berríos
- Manager: Luciano Theiler
- Stadium: Estadio Bautista Gargantini
- Copa Argentina: Round of 32
- Top goalscorer: League: Gonzalo Klusener (2); All: Gonzalo Klusener (2)

The 2019–20 season is Independiente Rivadavia's 14th consecutive season in the second division of Argentine football. In addition to Primera B Nacional, the club are competing in the Copa Argentina.

The season generally covers the period from 1 July 2019 to 30 June 2020.

== Review ==
=== Pre-season ===
Three players left Independiente Rivadavia before anyone came through the door, as Daniel Imperiale's departure to Ascenso MX side Cafetaleros de Chiapas on 5 June was followed by Nicolás Dematei (Agropecuario) and Federico Guerra (Tristán Suárez) agreeing moves away in the ten days following. Numerous loans from the previous campaign officially expired on and around 30 June. Sebastián Mayorga (Flandria), Rodrigo Ayala (Chacarita Juniors) and Franco Ledesma (Mitre) officially joined the club on 3 July. A fourth incoming was revealed on 4 July, as Julián Marcioni was loaned from Newell's Old Boys. Their first friendlies were played on 5 July, as they beat Deportivo Montecaseros 3–0 over two meetings. Emilio Porro and Sergio González signed on 8 July.

Independiente fell to defeat on 10 July in a friendly with lower league outfit Fray Luis Beltrán at Liceo Rugby Club, though responded with a 6–0 victory in the day's secondary encounter; which included a brace from Ignacio Irañeta and one from trialist Azarías Molina. Their third opponent of pre-season was San Martín (SJ), with the Primera B Nacional duo playing out back-to-back draws. Molina put pen to paper on 15 July, arriving from Belgrano. Colombian centre-back Jorge Zules Caicedo went to Alvarado on 18 July.

=== July ===
Independiente Rivadavia were eliminated from the Copa Argentina by Lanús on 20 July, falling at the round of thirty-two to a stoppage time goal from Marcelino Moreno. Gonzalo Klusener, from Agropecuario, became Independiente's eighth reinforcement on 25 July. Independiente made it three straight friendly draws on 27 July against Instituto, though won the secondary encounter after a strike from Matías Viguet.

=== August ===
Huracán Las Heras avoided defeat against Independiente on 3 August, firstly drawing 0–0 before taking the points off them via a Daian García goal. Independiente responded by going unbeaten in exhibition fixtures with Estudiantes (SL) on 9 August, with a 1–0 win preceding a 0–0 tie. Enzo Suraci and Abel Peralta penned terms to join from Primera División clubs on 13 August. Independiente lost 4–1 to Atlanta on the opening day of the 2019–20 Primera B Nacional, despite Gonzalo Klusener equalising on twelve minutes. Klusener scored again on matchday two, as Independiente secured a victory at home to Ferro Carril Oeste.

=== September ===
Independiente were defeated away from home for the second time in as many matches on 1 September, as Estudiantes (RC) beat them 3–1.

== Squad ==
Squad No.	Nationality	Name	Position(s)	Date of birth (age)	Signed from
Goalkeepers
	Argentina	Cristian Aracena	GK	8 February 1987 (age 39)	Gutiérrez
	Argentina	Emanuel Cirrincione	GK	4 April 1997 (age 29)	Academy
	Argentina	Joaquín Mattalia	GK	26 April 1992 (age 34)	Atenas
Defenders
	Argentina	Franco Abrego	DF	25 February 1999 (age 27)	Academy
	Argentina	Rodrigo Ayala	LB	11 August 1994 (age 32)	Chacarita Juniors
	Argentina	Juan Manuel Barrera	DF	28 June 1991 (age 35)	Gutiérrez
	Argentina	Rodrigo Colombo	CB	19 November 1992 (age 33)	Sport Huancayo
	Argentina	Franco Ledesma	DF	3 October 1992 (age 34)	Mitre
	Argentina	Yair Marín	CB	31 January 1990 (age 36)	Temperley
	Argentina	Julián Navas	RB	30 November 1993 (age 32)	Academy
	Argentina	Emilio Porro	RB	27 May 1996 (age 30)	All Boys
	Argentina	Luciano Sánchez	RB	25 January 1994 (age 32)	Academy
	Argentina	Enzo Suraci	DF		Godoy Cruz
Midfielders
	Argentina	Matías Abelairas	LM	18 June 1985 (age 41)	Nea Salamis Famagusta
	Argentina	Damián Cataldo	MF	1 August 1998 (age 28)	Academy
	Argentina	Lautaro Disanto	AM	30 May 1998 (age 28)	Academy
	Argentina	Maximiliano Meza	MF	13 June 1997 (age 29)	Ex Alumnos Escuela N°185
	Argentina	Franco Negri	LM	20 February 1995 (age 31)	San Lorenzo
	Argentina	Pablo Palacio	MF	18 May 2000 (age 26)	Academy
	Argentina	Abel Peralta	RM	1 March 1989 (age 37)	Patronato
	Argentina	Nicolás Quiroga	MF	20 May 1995 (age 31)	Academy
	Argentina	Santiago Úbeda	CM	4 July 1996 (age 30)	Sport Club Quiroga
	Argentina	Matías Viguet	MF	30 May 1998 (age 28)	Godoy Cruz
Forwards
	Argentina	Federico Castro	FW	28 August 1992 (age 34)	Defensores de Belgrano
	Argentina	Lucas Fernández	FW	12 June 1999 (age 27)	Academy
	Argentina	Sergio González	CF	5 April 1995 (age 31)	Lanús
	Argentina	Ignacio Irañeta	FW	24 February 1987 (age 39)	Gutiérrez
	Argentina	Gonzalo Klusener	CF	21 October 1983 (age 43)	Agropecuario
	Argentina	Cristian Lucero	FW	1 October 1987 (age 39)	Huracán Las Heras
	Argentina	Julián Marcioni	FW	19 March 1998 (age 28)	Newell's Old Boys (loan)
	Argentina	Sebastián Mayorga	FW	6 February 1990 (age 36)	Flandria
	Argentina	Azarías Molina	FW	2 January 1998 (age 28)	Belgrano
	Argentina	Juan Manuel Romero	FW	21 January 1998 (age 28)	Academy
	Argentina	Juan Cruz Santander	FW	19 January 1998 (age 28)	Academy
	Argentina	Hernán Soria	FW	17 June 1997 (age 29)	Academy

== Transfers ==
Domestic transfer windows:
3 July 2019 to 24 September 2019
20 January 2020 to 19 February 2020.

=== Transfers in ===
Date from	Position	Nationality	Name	From	Ref.
3 July 2019 (Note: Deal agreed on 2 July 2019)	FW	Argentina	Sebastián Mayorga	Flandria	
3 July 2019 (Note: Deal agreed on 2 July 2019)	LB	Argentina	Rodrigo Ayala	Chacarita Juniors	
3 July 2019 (Note: Deal agreed on 2 July 2019)	DF	Argentina	Franco Ledesma	Mitre	
8 July 2019	CF	Argentina	Sergio González	Lanús	
8 July 2019	RB	Argentina	Emilio Porro	All Boys (Note: Released by All Boys on 8 July.)	
15 July 2019	FW	Argentina	Azarías Molina	Belgrano	
25 July 2019	CF	Argentina	Gonzalo Klusener	Agropecuario	
13 August 2019	DF	Argentina	Enzo Suraci	Godoy Cruz	
13 August 2019	RM	Argentina	Abel Peralta	Patronato	

=== Transfers out ===
Date from	Position	Nationality	Name	To	Ref.
14 June 2019 (Note: Deal agreed on 5 June 2019)	RM	Argentina	Daniel Imperiale	Cafetaleros de Chiapas	
3 July 2019 (Note: Deal agreed on 8 June 2019)	LB	Argentina	Nicolás Dematei	Agropecuario	
3 July 2019 (Note: Deal agreed on 15 June 2019)	DM	Argentina	Federico Guerra	Tristán Suárez	
18 July 2019	CB	Colombia	Jorge Zules Caicedo	Alvarado	

=== Loans in ===
Start date	Position	Nationality	Name	From	End date	Ref.
4 July 2019	FW	Argentina	Julián Marcioni	Newell's Old Boys	30 June 2020	

== Friendlies ==
=== Pre-season ===
Independiente Rivadavia met lower-league duo Deportivo Montecaseros and Fray Luis Beltrán in their opening friendlies. Their third opponents of pre-season were San Juan-based San Martín. They'd also host Instituto.

Win Draw Loss

5 July 2019 Friendly	Independiente Rivadavia	1–0	Deportivo Montecaseros	Mendoza, Argentina
	M. Viguet	Independiente Rivadavia; Los Andes		Stadium: Liceo Rugby Club

5 July 2019 Friendly	Independiente Rivadavia	2–0	Deportivo Montecaseros	Mendoza, Argentina
	E. Mazal; J. Romero	Independiente Rivadavia; Los Andes		Stadium: Liceo Rugby Club

10 July 2019 Friendly	Independiente Rivadavia	0–1	Fray Luis Beltrán	Mendoza, Argentina
		Independiente Rivadavia; Diario UNO; 45 min. match	H. Alarcón	Stadium: Liceo Rugby Club

10 July 2019 Friendly	Independiente Rivadavia	6–0	Fray Luis Beltrán	Mendoza, Argentina
	I. Irañeta; E. Mazal; N. Quiroga; L. Fernández; A. Molina	Independiente Rivadavia; Diario UNO		Stadium: Liceo Rugby Club

13 July 2019 Friendly	San Martín (SJ)	0–0	Independiente Rivadavia	San Juan, Argentina
11:00 GMT-3		Independiente Rivadavia; Grupo La Provincia		Stadium: Estadio Ingeniero Hilario Sánchez

13 July 2019 Friendly	San Martín (SJ)	2–2	Independiente Rivadavia	San Juan, Argentina
	(o.g.); M. Bravo	Independiente Rivadavia; Grupo La Provincia	J. Romero; F. Abrego	Stadium: Estadio Ingeniero Hilario Sánchez

27 July 2019 Friendly	Independiente Rivadavia	1–1	Instituto	Mendoza, Argentina
14:30 GMT-3	J. M. Romero	Instituto; Los Andes	F. Silva (pen.)	Stadium: Estadio Bautista Gargantini; Referee: Nicolás Canizzo (Argentina)

27 July 2019 Friendly	Independiente Rivadavia	1–0	Instituto	Mendoza, Argentina
16:00 GMT-3	M. Viguet	Instituto; Los Andes		Stadium: Estadio Bautista Gargantini

3 August 2019 Friendly	Huracán Las Heras	0–0	Independiente Rivadavia	Mendoza, Argentina
		Independiente Rivadavia; Diario UNO; 80 min. match		Stadium: Predio El Cuervo; Referee: Rodrigo Mardones (Argentina)

3 August 2019 Friendly	Huracán Las Heras	1–0	Independiente Rivadavia	Mendoza, Argentina
	D. García	Los Andes		Stadium: Predio El Cuervo

9 August 2019 Friendly	Independiente Rivadavia	1–0	Estudiantes (SL)	Mendoza, Argentina
	G. Klusener (pen.)	Independiente Rivadavia; Los Andes		Stadium: Estadio Bautista Gargantini

9 August 2019 Friendly	Independiente Rivadavia	1–1	Estudiantes (SL)	Mendoza, Argentina
	J. M. Romero	Independiente Rivadavia; Los Andes	E. Soloppi	Stadium: Estadio Bautista Gargantini

== Competitions ==
=== Primera B Nacional ===
==== Results summary ====
Overall								Home						Away					
Pld	W	D	L	GF	GA	GD	Pts	W	D	L	GF	GA	GD	W	D	L	GF	GA	GD
3	1	0	2	5	9	−4	3	1	0	0	3	2	+1	0	0	2	2	7	−5

Last updated: 3 September 2019.
Source: Soccerway

==== Matches ====
The fixtures for the 2019–20 league season were announced on 1 August 2019, with a new format of split zones being introduced. Independiente Rivadavia were drawn in Zone A.

Win Draw Loss

17 August 2019 1	Atlanta	4–1	Independiente Rivadavia	Buenos Aires, Argentina
13:05 GMT-3	F. Pedrozo 11'; L. López 41', 45+1'; J. Ochoa Giménez 83'	Independiente Rivadavia; Aire de Santa Fe; Soccerway	G. Klusener 12'	Stadium: Estadio Don León Kolbovski; Referee: Pablo Giménez (Argentina)

24 August 2019 2	Independiente Rivadavia	3–2	Ferro Carril Oeste	Mendoza, Argentina
20:05 GMT-3	M. Viguet 8'; J. Navas 50'; G. Klusener 71'	Independiente Rivadavia; Cadena 3 Soccerway	R. Tesuri 23'; F. Pulicastro 76'	Stadium: Estadio Bautista Gargantini; Referee: Héctor Paletta (Argentina)

1 September 2019 3	Estudiantes (RC)	3–1	Independiente Rivadavia	Río Cuarto, Argentina
14:30 GMT-3	M. Peralta 70'; N. Cainelli 83'; A. Cabrera 90'	Independiente Rivadavia; Mendoza Post; Soccerway	S. Mayorga 36'	Stadium: Estadio Ciudad de Río Cuarto; Referee: Julio Barraza (Argentina)

8 September 2019 4	Independiente Rivadavia	–	Nueva Chicago	Mendoza, Argentina
17:30 GMT-3				Stadium: Estadio Bautista Gargantini

=== Copa Argentina ===
Independiente Rivadavia would face Lanús of the Primera División at Estadio Julio Humberto Grondona in Avellaneda on 20 July 2019, with Arsenal de Sarandí's stadium serving as a neutral venue for the fixture; as is usual in the competition.

Win Draw Loss

20 July 2019 R32	Lanús	1–0	Independiente Rivadavia	Avellaneda, Argentina
21:10 GMT-3	M. Moreno 90+4'	Lanús; Infobae; Soccerway		Stadium: Estadio Julio Humberto Grondona; Referee: Diego Abal (Argentina)

== Squad statistics ==
=== Appearances and goals ===
No.	Pos.	Nationality	Name	League		Cup		League Cup		Continental		Other		Total		Discipline		Ref
No.	Pos.	Nationality	Name	Apps	Goals	Apps	Goals	Apps	Goals	Apps	Goals	Apps	Goals	Apps	Goals	Yellow card	Red card	Ref
–	GK	Argentina	Cristian Aracena	3	0	1	0	—		—		0	0	4	0	0	0	
–	GK	Argentina	Emanuel Cirrincione	0	0	0	0	—		—		0	0	0	0	0	0	
–	GK	Argentina	Joaquín Mattalia	0	0	0	0	—		—		0	0	0	0	0	0	
–	DF	Argentina	Franco Abrego	0	0	0	0	—		—		0	0	0	0	0	0	
–	LB	Argentina	Rodrigo Ayala	2	0	0(1)	0	—		—		0	0	2(1)	0	0	0	
–	DF	Argentina	Juan Manuel Barrera	0	0	0	0	—		—		0	0	0	0	0	0	
–	CB	Argentina	Rodrigo Colombo	3	0	1	0	—		—		0	0	4	0	0	0	
–	DF	Argentina	Franco Ledesma	2	0	1	0	—		—		0	0	3	0	2	0	
–	CB	Argentina	Yair Marín	2	0	1	0	—		—		0	0	3	0	1	0	
–	RB	Argentina	Julián Navas	2	1	0	0	—		—		0	0	2	1	0	0	
–	RB	Argentina	Emilio Porro	0(1)	0	0(1)	0	—		—		0	0	0(2)	0	0	0	
–	RB	Argentina	Luciano Sánchez	1	0	1	0	—		—		0	0	2	0	0	0	
–	DF	Argentina	Enzo Suraci	0	0	0	0	—		—		0	0	0	0	0	0	
–	LM	Argentina	Matías Abelairas	0	0	0	0	—		—		0	0	0	0	0	0	
–	MF	Argentina	Damián Cataldo	0	0	0	0	—		—		0	0	0	0	0	0	
–	AM	Argentina	Lautaro Disanto	0(1)	0	0	0	—		—		0	0	0(1)	0	0	0	
–	MF	Argentina	Maximiliano Meza	0	0	0	0	—		—		0	0	0	0	0	0	
–	LM	Argentina	Franco Negri	0(3)	0	0	0	—		—		0	0	0(3)	0	0	0	
–	MF	Argentina	Pablo Palacio	0(2)	0	0	0	—		—		0	0	0(2)	0	1	0	
–	RM	Argentina	Abel Peralta	0(1)	0	0	0	—		—		0	0	0(1)	0	0	0	
–	MF	Argentina	Nicolás Quiroga	0	0	1	0	—		—		0	0	1	0	0	0	
–	CM	Argentina	Santiago Úbeda	3	0	1	0	—		—		0	0	4	0	0	0	
–	MF	Argentina	Matías Viguet	3	1	1	0	—		—		0	0	4	1	0	0	
–	FW	Argentina	Federico Castro	0	0	0	0	—		—		0	0	0	0	0	0	
–	FW	Argentina	Lucas Fernández	0	0	0	0	—		—		0	0	0	0	0	0	
–	CF	Argentina	Sergio González	3	0	1	0	—		—		0	0	4	0	0	0	
–	FW	Argentina	Ignacio Irañeta	0	0	0	0	—		—		0	0	0	0	0	0	
–	CF	Argentina	Gonzalo Klusener	3	2	0	0	—		—		0	0	3	2	1	0	
–	FW	Argentina	Cristian Lucero	0	0	0	0	—		—		0	0	0	0	0	0	
–	FW	Argentina	Julián Marcioni	3	0	1	0	—		—		0	0	4	0	0	0	
–	FW	Argentina	Sebastián Mayorga	3	1	1	0	—		—		0	0	4	1	3	0	
–	FW	Argentina	Azarías Molina	0(1)	0	0(1)	0	—		—		0	0	0(2)	0	0	0	
–	FW	Argentina	Juan Manuel Romero	0	0	0	0	—		—		0	0	0	0	0	0	
–	FW	Argentina	Juan Cruz Santander	0	0	0	0	—		—		0	0	0	0	0	0	
–	FW	Argentina	Hernán Soria	0	0	0	0	—		—		0	0	0	0	0	0	
Own goals				—	0	—	0	—		—		—	0	—	0	—	—	—

Statistics accurate as of 3 September 2019.

=== Goalscorers ===
Rank	Pos	No.	Nat	Name	League	Cup	League Cup	Continental	Other	Total	Ref
1	CF	–	Argentina	Gonzalo Klusener	2	0	—	—	0	2	
2	MF	–	Argentina	Matías Viguet	1	0	—	—	0	1	
2	RB	–	Argentina	Julián Navas	1	0	—	—	0	1	
2	FW	–	Argentina	Sebastián Mayorga	1	0	—	—	0	1	
Own goals					0	0	—	—	0	0	
Totals					5	0	—	—	0	5	—
