= 2020 Primera Nacional =

36th season of the second-tier football league in Argentina

Primera Nacional
- Season: 2020
- Dates: 28 November 2020 – 31 January 2021
- Champions: Sarmiento (J) (1st title)
- Promoted: Sarmiento (J); Platense
- Relegated: None
- Matches: 131
- Goals: 291 (2.22 per match)
- Top goalscorer: Claudio Bieler (6 goals)
- Biggest home win: Almagro 4–0 All Boys (27 December 2020); Estudiantes (RC) 4–0 Agropecuario (10 January 2021)
- Biggest away win: Nueva Chicago 2–5 Alvarado (5 December 2020); Ferro Carril Oeste 0–3 Atlanta (7 December 2020); San Martín (T) 0–3 Atl. de Rafaela (13 December 2020)
- Highest scoring: Nueva Chicago 2–5 Alvarado (5 December 2020)

The 2020 Argentine Primera Nacional, also known as the 2020 Campeonato de Transición Primera Nacional, was the 36th season of the Primera Nacional, the second tier of Argentine football. The season began on 28 November 2020 and concluded on 31 January 2021. The competition was contested by the thirty-two teams that took part in the 2019–20 season, which was suspended and subsequently abandoned due to the COVID-19 pandemic.

== Format ==
The competition was split into two stages: First Promotion and Second Promotion, which in turn, were split into two groups according to the groupings and placements of teams in the previous season. The top eight teams of each group at the time of suspension of the previous season played in the First Promotion stage, where they were split into two groups, while the remaining eight teams from each group played in the first round of the Second Promotion stage. In both stages, the teams were placed in groups according to the ones they were in for the previous season. In the First Promotion stage, each team played against the other teams in their group once, with the group winners playing a final match on neutral ground to decide the first promoted team to the Liga Profesional for the 2021 season.

In the Second Promotion stage, each team also played against the other teams in their group once, with the top two in each group qualifying for a knockout tournament where they were joined by the teams that failed to earn promotion in the First Promotion stage, with the two group runners-up from that stage having a bye to the third knockout round and the loser from the First Promotion final having a bye to the semi-finals. The winners of that knockout tournament earned the second promotion berth to the Liga Profesional.

== Club information ==
=== Stadia and locations ===
Locations of the 2020 Primera B Nacional teams outside Greater Buenos Aires.
Locations of the 2020 Primera B Nacional teams within Greater Buenos Aires.

Club	City	Stadium
Agropecuario Argentino	Carlos Casares	Ofelia Rosenzuaig
All Boys	Buenos Aires	Islas Malvinas
Almagro	José Ingenieros	Tres de Febrero
Alvarado	Mar del Plata	José María Minella
Atlanta	Buenos Aires	Don León Kolbowsky
Atlético de Rafaela	Rafaela	Nuevo Monumental
Belgrano	Córdoba	Julio César Villagra
Barracas Central	Buenos Aires	Claudio Chiqui Tapia
Brown	Adrogué	Lorenzo Arandilla
Chacarita Juniors	Villa Maipú	Chacarita Juniors
Defensores de Belgrano	Buenos Aires	Juan Pasquale
Deportivo Morón	Morón	Nuevo Francisco Urbano
Deportivo Riestra	Buenos Aires	Guillermo Laza
Estudiantes (BA)	Caseros	Ciudad de Caseros
Estudiantes (RC)	Río Cuarto	Antonio Candini
Ferro Carril Oeste	Buenos Aires	Arquitecto Ricardo Etcheverry
Gimnasia y Esgrima (J)	Jujuy	23 de Agosto
Gimnasia y Esgrima (M)	Mendoza	Víctor Legrotaglie
Guillermo Brown	Puerto Madryn	Raúl Conti
Independiente Rivadavia	Mendoza	Bautista Gargantini
Instituto	Córdoba	Presidente Perón
Mitre (SdE)	Santiago del Estero	Doctores José y Antonio Castiglione
Nueva Chicago	Buenos Aires	Nueva Chicago
Platense	Florida Este	Ciudad de Vicente López
Quilmes	Quilmes	Centenario
San Martín (SJ)	San Juan	Ingeniero Hilario Sánchez
San Martín (SJ)	San Juan	Estadio del Bicentenario
San Martín (T)	Tucumán	La Ciudadela
Santamarina	Tandil	Municipal Gral. San Martín
Sarmiento	Junín	Eva Perón
Temperley	Temperley	Alfredo Beranger
Tigre	Victoria	José Dellagiovanna
Villa Dálmine	Campana	Villa Dálmine

== First Promotion stage ==
=== Zone A ===
Pos	Team	Pld	W	D	L	GF	GA	GD	Pts	Qualification	ERC	PLA	EBA	AGA	ATL	DMO	TEM	FCO
1	Estudiantes (RC)	7	3	4	0	11	5	+6	13	Advance to Championship final	—	1–1	—	4–0	—	0–0	—	2–1
2	Platense	7	3	4	0	10	6	+4	13	Advance to Eliminatory stage third knockout round	—	—	—	1–1	—	1–1	2–1	—
3	Estudiantes (BA)	7	3	3	1	13	10	+3	12	Advance to Eliminatory stage first knockout round	2–2	1–1	—	3–1	3–3	—	—	—
4	Agropecuario Argentino	7	3	1	3	7	11	−4	10	Advance to Eliminatory stage first knockout round	—	—	—	—	—	1–0	1–0	0–1
5	Atlanta	7	2	2	3	12	12	0	8	Advance to Eliminatory stage first knockout round	1–2	0–2	—	2–3	—	—	1–1	—
6	Deportivo Morón	7	1	3	3	6	8	−2	6	Advance to Eliminatory stage first knockout round	—	—	2–1	—	1–2	—	—	2–3
7	Temperley	7	1	3	3	3	5	−2	6	Advance to Eliminatory stage first knockout round	0–0	—	0–1	—	—	0–0	—	1–0
8	Ferro Carril Oeste	7	2	0	5	7	12	−5	6	Advance to Eliminatory stage first knockout round	—	1–2	1–2	—	0–3	—	—	—

Source: AFA
Legend: Blue = home team win; Yellow = draw; Red = away team win.
Rules for classification: 1) points; 2) goal difference; 3) goals scored; 4) head-to-head points; 5) head-to-head goal difference; 6) head-to-head goals scored.

=== Zone B ===
Pos	Team	Pld	W	D	L	GF	GA	GD	Pts	Qualification	SAR	ATR	DBE	TIG	GEM	DRI	VDA	SMT
1	Sarmiento (J)	7	4	3	0	8	4	+4	15	Advance to Championship final	—	—	1–0	1–1	—	—	0–0	1–0
2	Atlético de Rafaela	7	4	2	1	13	8	+5	14	Advance to Eliminatory stage third knockout round	0–0	—	—	3–2	2–1	—	—	—
3	Defensores de Belgrano	7	4	1	2	6	3	+3	13	Advance to Eliminatory stage first knockout round	—	2–0	—	—	0–0	1–0	—	0–1
4	Tigre	7	2	2	3	9	9	0	8	Advance to Eliminatory stage first knockout round	—	—	0–1	—	—	1–2	3–1	—
5	Gimnasia y Esgrima (M)	7	1	4	2	10	10	0	7	Advance to Eliminatory stage first knockout round	2–3	—	—	1–1	—	—	1–1	—
6	Deportivo Riestra	7	1	3	3	8	11	−3	6	Advance to Eliminatory stage first knockout round	1–2	3–3	—	—	1–3	—	—	0–0
7	Villa Dálmine	7	1	3	3	5	9	−4	6	Advance to Eliminatory stage first knockout round	—	0–2	1–2	—	—	1–1	—	—
8	San Martín (T)	7	1	2	4	3	8	−5	5	Advance to Eliminatory stage first knockout round	—	0–3	—	0–1	2–2	—	0–1	—

Source: AFA
Legend: Blue = home team win; Yellow = draw; Red = away team win.
Rules for classification: 1) points; 2) goal difference; 3) goals scored; 4) head-to-head points; 5) head-to-head goal difference; 6) head-to-head goals scored.

=== Championship final ===
16 January 2021
19:10

Estudiantes (RC)	1–1	Sarmiento (J)
Sepúlveda 21'	Report 1 Report 2	Pombo 40'
Penalties
Ortigoza (penalty scored); Ferreira (penalty scored); Ardente (penalty missed); Vester (penalty scored); Sepúlveda (penalty missed)	3–4	(penalty missed) Torres; (penalty scored) Garnier; (penalty scored) Graciani; (penalty scored) Mancinelli; (penalty scored) Vismara

Estadio 15 de Abril, Santa Fe
Attendance: 0
Referee: Fernando Rapallini

==== Match details ====
Team details

Sarmiento (J)
Estudiantes (RC)

GK	1	(Argentina) Manuel Vicentini (c)
DF	4	(Argentina) Martín García	Yellow card Red card
DF	2	(Argentina) Federico Mancinelli	Yellow card
DF	6	(Argentina) Brian Salvareschi
DF	3	(Argentina) Facundo Castet		Substituted off
MF	7	(Argentina) Gabriel Graciani	Yellow card
MF	5	(Argentina) Federico Vismara
MF	10	(Argentina) Sergio Quiroga		Substituted off
FW	8	(Argentina) Claudio Pombo		Substituted off
FW	9	(Argentina) Jonathan Torres
FW	11	(Argentina) Mauro Albertengo		Substituted off
Substitutions:
DF	13	(Argentina) Francisco Oliver		Substituted on
DF	14	(Argentina) Yamil Garnier		Substituted on
MF	15	(Argentina) Fabio Vázquez		Substituted on
FW	16	(Argentina) Benjamín Borasi		Substituted on
Manager:
(Argentina) Mario Sciacqua

GK	1	(Argentina) Luis Ardente
DF	4	(Argentina) Gastón Benavídez
DF	2	(Argentina) Nicolás Ferreyra
DF	6	(Argentina) Gonzalo Maffini	Yellow card
DF	3	(Argentina) Lucas Suárez	Yellow card Red card
MF	7	(Argentina) Nahuel Cainelli		Substituted off
MF	5	(Argentina) Gastón Bottino (c)	Yellow card	Substituted off
MF	10	(Argentina) Víctor Beraldi	Yellow card	Substituted off
MF	8	(Argentina) Maximiliano Comba		Substituted off
FW	11	(Argentina) Bruno Sepúlveda
FW	9	(Argentina) Ibrahim Hesar		Substituted off
Substitutions:
DF	13	(Argentina) Alan Vester		Substituted on
DF	14	(Argentina) Maximiliano Padilla		Substituted on
MF	15	(Paraguay) Néstor Ortigoza		Substituted on
FW	17	(Argentina) Yair Arismendi		Substituted on
FW	18	(Paraguay) Javier Ferreira		Substituted on
Manager:
(Argentina) Marcelo Vázquez

== Second Promotion stage ==
=== Zone A ===
Pos	Team	Pld	W	D	L	GF	GA	GD	Pts	Qualification	SMA	BAC	BEL	ALV	MIT	GBR	NCH	IND
1	San Martín (SJ)	7	4	3	0	5	1	+4	15	Advance to Eliminatory stage first knockout round	—	0–0	0–0	—	1–1	—	1–0	—
2	Barracas Central	7	4	2	1	7	4	+3	14	Advance to Eliminatory stage first knockout round	—	—	1–0	—	—	2–1	0–1	2–1
3	Belgrano	7	3	3	1	8	3	+5	12		—	—	—	2–2	—	—	2–0	3–0
4	Alvarado	7	2	3	2	12	8	+4	9		0–1	0–1	—	—	—	0–0	—	3–0
5	Mitre (SdE)	7	1	5	1	8	9	−1	8		—	1–1	0–0	2–2	—	—	1–1	—
6	Guillermo Brown	7	1	3	3	6	7	−1	6		0–1	—	0–1	—	4–2	—	—	—
7	Nueva Chicago	7	1	2	4	6	12	−6	5		—	—	—	2–5	—	1–1	—	1–2
8	Independiente Rivadavia	7	1	1	5	3	11	−8	4		0–1	—	—	—	0–1	0–0	—	—

Source: AFA
Legend: Blue = home team win; Yellow = draw; Red = away team win.
Rules for classification: 1) points; 2) goal difference; 3) goals scored; 4) head-to-head points; 5) head-to-head goal difference; 6) head-to-head goals scored.

=== Zone B ===
Pos	Team	Pld	W	D	L	GF	GA	GD	Pts	Qualification	QUI	INS	ALM	SAN	BRO	GEJ	ALL	CHA
1	Quilmes	7	4	1	2	9	7	+2	13	Advance to Eliminatory stage first knockout round	—	—	—	—	1–0	3–2	—	3–2
2	Instituto	7	3	3	1	11	9	+2	12	Advance to Eliminatory stage first knockout round	2–1	—	0–1	3–2	—	—	—	2–1
3	Almagro	7	4	0	3	7	5	+2	12		0–1	—	—	—	—	1–0	4–0	0–2
4	Santamarina	7	3	1	3	11	10	+1	10		1–0	—	2–0	—	1–3	—	—	3–1
5	Brown	7	2	3	2	6	5	+1	9		—	1–1	0–1	—	—	2–1	0–0	—
6	Gimnasia y Esgrima (J)	7	2	2	3	9	9	0	8		—	1–1	—	2–2	—	—	2–0	—
7	All Boys	7	1	4	2	3	8	−5	7		0–0	2–2	—	1–0	—	—	—	—
8	Chacarita Juniors	7	1	2	4	6	9	−3	5		—	—	—	—	0–0	0–1	0–0	—

Source: AFA
Legend: Blue = home team win; Yellow = draw; Red = away team win.
Rules for classification: 1) points; 2) goal difference; 3) goals scored; 4) head-to-head points; 5) head-to-head goal difference; 6) head-to-head goals scored.

=== Eliminatory stage ===
==== First knockout round ====
The first knockout round was contested by 16 teams: the 12 teams ranked from third to eighth place in their groups of the First Promotion stage and the top two teams from each group of the Second Promotion stage. In this round, the 16 teams were seeded according to their performance and placements in the previous stage of the competition, with teams coming from the First Promotion stage being given a higher seed, and paired against a rival according to their seed: Team 1 vs. Team 16, Team 2 vs. Team 15 and so on, playing a single match on neutral ground. The eight winners advanced to the second knockout round.

Pos	Grp	Team	Pld	W	D	L	GF	GA	GD	Pts	Qualification
1	B	Defensores de Belgrano	7	4	1	2	6	3	+3	13	Qualified from First Promotion stage
2	A	Estudiantes (BA)	7	3	3	1	13	10	+3	12	Qualified from First Promotion stage
3	A	Agropecuario Argentino	7	3	1	3	7	11	−4	10	Qualified from First Promotion stage
4	B	Tigre	7	2	2	3	9	9	0	8	Qualified from First Promotion stage
5	A	Atlanta	7	2	2	3	12	12	0	8	Qualified from First Promotion stage
6	B	Gimnasia y Esgrima (M)	7	1	4	2	10	10	0	7	Qualified from First Promotion stage
7	A	Deportivo Morón	7	1	3	3	6	8	−2	6	Qualified from First Promotion stage
8	B	Deportivo Riestra	7	1	3	3	8	11	−3	6	Qualified from First Promotion stage
9	A	Temperley	7	1	3	3	3	5	−2	6	Qualified from First Promotion stage
10	B	Villa Dálmine	7	1	3	3	5	9	−4	6	Qualified from First Promotion stage
11	A	Ferro Carril Oeste	7	2	0	5	7	12	−5	6	Qualified from First Promotion stage
12	B	San Martín (T)	7	1	2	4	3	8	−5	5	Qualified from First Promotion stage
13	A	San Martín (SJ)	7	4	3	0	5	1	+4	15	Qualified from Second Promotion stage
14	B	Quilmes	7	4	1	2	9	7	+2	13	Qualified from Second Promotion stage
15	A	Barracas Central	7	4	2	1	7	4	+3	14	Qualified from Second Promotion stage
16	B	Instituto	7	3	3	1	11	9	+2	12	Qualified from Second Promotion stage

Source: AFA

17 January 2021	Defensores de Belgrano	2–0	Instituto	Campana
17:10	Benegas 9'; Núñez 90+4'	Report		Stadium: Coliseo de Mitre y Puccini; Attendance: 0 Referee: Yamil Possi

17 January 2021	Atlanta	2–2 (4–1 p)	San Martín (T)	Río Cuarto
17:10	Giménez 55' (pen.); Marcioni 90'	Report	Noir 49'; A. Costa 70'	Stadium: Antonio Candini; Attendance: 0 Referee: Adrián Franklin
	Penalties
	Giménez (penalty scored); Marinucci (penalty scored); Previtali (penalty scored); Marcioni (penalty scored)		(penalty missed) A. Costa; (penalty scored) Diarte; (penalty missed) R. Costa

17 January 2021	Gimnasia y Esgrima (M)	1–4	Ferro Carril Oeste	Córdoba
17:10	Lentini 72'	Report	Toloza 5'; Bordacahar 24'; Gómez 59'; Ramírez 86'	Stadium: Presidente Perón; Attendance: 0 Referee: Yael Falcón Pérez

17 January 2021	Deportivo Morón	2–1	Villa Dálmine	Florida Este
17:10	Villalba 38'; Álvarez 90+2'	Report	Sánchez 73'	Stadium: Ciudad de Vicente López; Attendance: 0 Referee: Nazareno Arasa

17 January 2021	Estudiantes (BA)	2–2 (3–2 p)	Barracas Central	Buenos Aires
19:10	Bandiera 41'; Verón 44'	Report	Estigarribia 24', 66'	Stadium: Diego Armando Maradona; Attendance: 0 Referee: Diego Ceballos
	Penalties
	Ruiz Gómez (penalty scored); González (penalty missed); Bandiera (penalty scored); Figueroa (penalty missed); Rinaldi (penalty scored)		(penalty scored) Tapia; (penalty missed) Colitto; (penalty scored) Estigarribia; (penalty missed) Vásquez; (penalty missed) Acuña

17 January 2021	Tigre	1–1 (3–4 p)	San Martín (SJ)	Caseros
19:15	Protti 20'	Report	Alarcón 30' (o.g.)	Stadium: Ciudad de Caseros; Attendance: 0 Referee: Pablo Echavarría
	Penalties
	Magnín (penalty scored); Moiraghi (penalty scored); Giacopuzzi (penalty missed); Marinelli (penalty scored); Luna (penalty missed)		(penalty missed) Sánchez; (penalty scored) Campana; (penalty scored) Berterame; (penalty scored) Ramírez; (penalty scored) Rescaldani

17 January 2021	Deportivo Riestra	1–0	Temperley	Villa Maipú
20:00	Brito 57'	Report		Stadium: Chacarita Juniors; Attendance: 0 Referee: Gerardo Méndez Cerro

18 January 2021	Agropecuario Argentino	0–1	Quilmes	Buenos Aires
17:00		Report	Pavone 69'	Stadium: Don León Kolbowski; Attendance: 0 Referee: Leandro Rey Hilfer
Note: The match was originally scheduled on 17 January 2021 at 21:10 but was suspended due to an electric failure at Estadio Don León Kolbowski. It was rescheduled to 18 January 2021 at 17:00.

==== Second knockout round ====
The second knockout round was contested by the eight winners from the previous stage. In this round, the eight teams were once again seeded according to their performance and placements in the first stage of the competition, with teams coming from the First Promotion stage being given a higher seed and paired against a rival according to their seed, playing a single match on neutral ground. The four winners advanced to the third knockout round.

Pos	Team	Pld	W	D	L	GF	GA	GD	Pts	Qualification
1	Defensores de Belgrano	7	4	1	2	6	3	+3	13	Qualified from First Promotion stage
2	Estudiantes (BA)	7	3	3	1	13	10	+3	12	Qualified from First Promotion stage
3	Atlanta	7	2	2	3	12	12	0	8	Qualified from First Promotion stage
4	Deportivo Morón	7	1	3	3	6	8	−2	6	Qualified from First Promotion stage
5	Deportivo Riestra	7	1	3	3	8	11	−3	6	Qualified from First Promotion stage
6	Ferro Carril Oeste	7	2	0	5	7	12	−5	6	Qualified from First Promotion stage
7	San Martín (SJ)	7	4	3	0	5	1	+4	15	Qualified from Second Promotion stage
8	Quilmes	7	4	1	2	9	7	+2	13	Qualified from Second Promotion stage

Source: AFA

21 January 2021	Estudiantes (BA)	3–1	San Martín (SJ)	Buenos Aires
17:10	Garay 63'; Bolzicco 67', 81'	Report	Berterame 6'	Stadium: Don León Kolbowski; Attendance: 0 Referee: Yael Falcón Pérez

21 January 2021	Deportivo Morón	0–1	Deportivo Riestra	Victoria
19:15		Report	Gómez 59'	Stadium: José Dellagiovanna; Attendance: 0 Referee: Adrián Franklin

21 January 2021	Atlanta	2–1	Ferro Carril Oeste	Florida Este
19:20	Ochoa 32'; Tecilla 46'	Report	Rago 90+2' (o.g.)	Stadium: Ciudad de Vicente López; Attendance: 0 Referee: Pablo Echavarría

21 January 2021	Defensores de Belgrano	0–1	Quilmes	Caseros
21:30		Report	Pavone 68'	Stadium: Ciudad de Caseros; Attendance: 0 Referee: Pablo Giménez

==== Third knockout round ====
The third knockout round was contested by the four winners from the previous stage, as well as the two group runners-up from the First Promotion stage, Platense and Atlético de Rafaela. In this round, the six teams were once again seeded according to their performance and placements in the first stage of the competition, with teams coming from the First Promotion stage being given a higher seed and paired against a rival according to their seed, playing a single match on neutral ground. The three winners advanced to the semi-finals.

Pos	Team	Pld	W	D	L	GF	GA	GD	Pts	Qualification
1	Atlético de Rafaela	7	4	2	1	13	8	+5	14	Qualified from First Promotion stage
2	Platense	7	3	4	0	10	6	+4	13	Qualified from First Promotion stage
3	Estudiantes (BA)	7	3	3	1	13	10	+3	12	Qualified from First Promotion stage
4	Atlanta	7	2	2	3	12	12	0	8	Qualified from First Promotion stage
5	Deportivo Riestra	7	1	3	3	8	11	−3	6	Qualified from First Promotion stage
6	Quilmes	7	4	1	2	9	7	+2	13	Qualified from Second Promotion stage

Source: AFA

24 January 2021	Atlético de Rafaela	2–2 (10–9 p)	Quilmes	Rosario
18:20	Portillo 58'; Bieler 78' (pen.)	Report	Pavone 41'; Acevedo 83'	Stadium: Marcelo Bielsa; Attendance: 0 Referee: Darío Herrera
	Penalties
	Bieler (penalty scored); Brundo (penalty scored); Lesman (penalty scored); Copetti (penalty scored); Castro (penalty missed); Martino (penalty scored); Romero (penalty scored); Blondel (penalty scored); Piñero (penalty scored); Sara (penalty scored); Bieler (penalty scored)		(penalty missed) Calello; (penalty scored) Arias; (penalty scored) Moreira; (penalty scored) González; (penalty scored) Matheu; (penalty scored) Acevedo; (penalty scored) Blanco; (penalty scored) Ortega; (penalty scored) Alegre; (penalty scored) Glellel; (penalty missed) Calello

24 January 2021	Estudiantes (BA)	1–0	Atlanta	Victoria
20:25	Bandiera 51'	Report		Stadium: José Dellagiovanna; Attendance: 0 Referee: Fernando Echenique

24 January 2021	Platense	0–0 (8–7 p)	Deportivo Riestra	Caseros
22:25		Report		Stadium: Ciudad de Caseros; Attendance: 0 Referee: Andrés Merlos
	Penalties
	Bogado (penalty scored); Callegari (penalty missed); Recalde (penalty scored); Tissera (penalty scored); Vega (penalty scored); Lluy (penalty missed); Palacios (penalty scored); Baldassarra (penalty scored); De Olivera (penalty scored); Sinisterra (penalty scored)		(penalty missed) Pereira; (penalty scored) Brito; (penalty scored) Romero; (penalty scored) Zaninovic; (penalty scored) Tovo; (penalty missed) Gómez; (penalty scored) Soto; (penalty scored) Murillo; (penalty scored) Villoldo; (penalty missed) Vega

==== Semi-finals ====
The semi-finals were contested by the three winners from the previous stage, as well as the First Promotion final losers Estudiantes (RC). In this round, the four teams were once again seeded according to their performance and placements in the first stage of the competition, with teams coming from the First Promotion stage being given a higher seed and paired against a rival according to their seed, playing a single match on neutral ground. The two winners advanced to the final.

Pos	Team	Pld	W	D	L	GF	GA	GD	Pts	Qualification
1	Estudiantes (RC)	7	3	4	0	11	5	+6	13	Qualified from First Promotion final
2	Atlético de Rafaela	7	4	2	1	13	8	+5	14	Qualified from First Promotion stage
3	Platense	7	3	4	0	10	6	+4	13	Qualified from First Promotion stage
4	Estudiantes (BA)	7	3	3	1	13	10	+3	12	Qualified from First Promotion stage

Source: AFA

27 January 2021	Estudiantes (RC)	1–0	Estudiantes (BA)	Rosario
19:15	Hesar 18'	Report		Stadium: Gigante de Arroyito; Attendance: 0 Referee: Jorge Baliño

27 January 2021	Atlético de Rafaela	0–2	Platense	Rosario
21:30		Report	Recalde 1'; Baldassarra 76'	Stadium: Marcelo Bielsa; Attendance: 0 Referee: Ariel Penel

==== Final ====
2020 Torneo Reducido Final
31 January 2021
21:10

Estudiantes (RC)	1–1	Platense
Hesar 37'	Report 1 Report 2	Tissera 4'
Penalties
Ortigoza (penalty scored); Fernández (penalty missed); Padilla (penalty scored); Benavídez (penalty missed)	2–4	(penalty scored) Lamberti; (penalty scored) Zalazar; (penalty scored) Recalde; (penalty scored) Tissera

Estadio Marcelo Bielsa, Rosario
Attendance: 0
Referee: Néstor Pitana

Team details

Estudiantes (RC)
Platense

GK	1	(Argentina) Brian Olivera
DF	4	(Argentina) Gastón Benavídez
DF	2	(Argentina) Nicolás Ferreyra
DF	6	(Argentina) Gonzalo Maffini	Yellow card
DF	3	(Argentina) Lucas Suárez	Yellow card	(substituted off) a'
MF	8	(Argentina) Nahuel Cainelli		(substituted off) b'
MF	5	(Argentina) Gastón Bottino (c)
MF	10	(Argentina) Víctor Beraldi	Yellow card	(substituted off) e'
MF	11	(Argentina) Bruno Sepúlveda	Yellow card	(substituted off) c'
FW	7	(Argentina) Yair Arismendi		(substituted off) d'
FW	9	(Syria) Ibrahim Hesar	Yellow card
Substitutes:
DF	13	(Argentina) Maximiliano Padilla		(substituted on) a'
MF	15	(Paraguay) Néstor Ortigoza		(substituted on) e'
FW	16	(Argentina) Maximiliano Comba		(substituted on) b'
MF	17	(Argentina) Marcos G. Fernández		(substituted on) d'
FW	18	(Paraguay) Javier Ferreira		(substituted on) c'
Manager:
(Argentina) Marcelo Vázquez

GK	1	(Argentina) Jorge De Olivera
DF	4	(Argentina) Brian Lluy
DF	2	(Argentina) Nicolás Zalazar
DF	6	(Argentina) Luciano Recalde
DF	3	(Argentina) Juan Infante	Yellow card
MF	11	(Argentina) Franco Baldassarra	Yellow card		(substituted off) a'
MF	8	(Argentina) Mauro Bogado	Yellow card
MF	5	(Argentina) Hernán Lamberti (c)
MF	10	(Argentina) José Luis Sinisterra		(substituted off) b'
FW	7	(Argentina) Matías Tissera
FW	9	(Argentina) Facundo Curuchet		(substituted off) c'
Substitutes:
MF	15	(Argentina) Roberto Bochi		(substituted on) a'
MF	16	(Argentina) Tiago Palacios		(substituted on) b'
MF	17	(Argentina) Ignacio Schor		(substituted on) c'
Manager:
(Argentina) Juan Manuel Llop

== Season statistics ==
=== Top scorers ===
Rank	Player	Club	Goals
1	(Argentina) Claudio Bieler	Atlético de Rafaela	6
2	(Argentina) Enzo Copetti	Atlético de Rafaela	5
2	(Argentina) Neri Bandiera	Estudiantes (BA)	5
2	(Argentina) Ibrahim Hesar	Estudiantes (RC)	5
2	(Argentina) Mariano Pavone	Quilmes	5
6	(Argentina) Julián Marcioni	Atlanta	4
6	(Argentina) Bruno Sepúlveda	Estudiantes (RC)	4
6	(Argentina) Matías Tissera	Platense	4
6	(Argentina) Jonathan Torres	Sarmiento (J)	4

== See also ==
- 2020 Copa de la Liga Profesional
- 2020 Torneo Federal A
- 2019–20 Copa Argentina
