= Lucero (surname) =

Lucero is a Spanish surname, deriving from the Spanish “Luz” meaning light. Notable people with the surname include:

- Adrián Lucero (born 1984), Argentine footballer
- Alfredo Lucero (born 1979), Argentine cyclist
- Anna Larroucau Laborde de Lucero (1864 – 1956), French philanthropist and educator
- Anthony Lucero (director), American film director and visual effects editor
- Armando Lucero (1942 – 2010), Argentine suspect
- Ariel Lucero (born 1999), Argentine footballer
- Arlette Lucero, American visual artist, educator and illustrator
- Beatriz Lucero Lhuillier, (born Beatriz Lucero, 1972), American taekwondoist
- Carla Lucero, American composer/librettist
- Carla Lucero (tennis) (born 1990), Argentine tennis player
- Carlos F. Lucero (born 1940), American judge
- Cristian Lucero (footballer, born 1987), Argentine footballer
- Cristian Lucero (footballer, born 1988), Argentine footballer
- Diego Rodríguez de Lucero, inquisitor based in Córdoba between 1499 and 1507
- Ed Lucero, American kayaker
- Eduardo Lucero, Mexican fashion designer
- Emanuel Lucero (born 1995), Argentine footballer
- Emmanuel Lucero (born 1978), Mexican boxer
- Enrique Lucero (1920 – 1989), Mexican film actor
- Eric Lucero (born 1977/1978), American politician
- Evelina Zuni Lucero, Native American writer
- Georgina Zapata Lucero (born 1981), Mexican politician
- Isaías Lucero, Mexican singer
- Jesús Lucero, Mexican paralympic athlete
- Juan Manuel Lucero (born 1985), Argentine footballer
- Juan Martín Lucero (born 1991), Argentine footballer
- Judy Lucero, prisoner poet
- Karol Lucero (born 1987), Chilean entertainer
- Marcelo Lucero (born 1980), Chilean footballer
- Martín Lucero (born 1990), Argentine footballer
- Michael Lucero (1963 – 1998), American music video director
- Michael Lucero (sculptor) (1953–), American artist
- Pablo Lucero (c. 1800 - 1856), Argentine politician
- Richard Lucero (born 1934), mayor from New Mexico
- Robert Edward Lucero, Philippine Army officer
- Roberto Lucero (born 1966), Argentine biathlete
- Santiago Lucero (1904 – ??), Filipino politician
- Sid Lucero (born 1981), Filipino television and film actor
- Wendy Lucero-Schayes (born 1963), American diver
- Zavier Lucero (born 1999), Filipino basketball player

== See also ==
- Lucero (given name)
