= Alejandro Abaurre =

Argentine footballer

Personal information
- Full name: Juan Alejandro Abaurre
- Place of birth: Mendoza, Argentina
- Height: 1.80 m (5 ft 11 in)
- Position: Forward

Youth career
- Godoy Cruz

Senior career*
Years	Team	Apps	(Gls)
1990–1991	Godoy Cruz		
1991	Racing Club	10	(1)
1992–1993	FC Basel		
1993	Deportes Concepción	0	(0)
1994–2002	Godoy Cruz		
1997–1998	→ Palestino (loan)	17	(6)
2002–2003	Olimpo	13	(1)
2003	Quilmes	8	(1)
2004	San Martín Mendoza	33	(5)
2004–2005	Gimnasia de Jujuy	18	(8)
2005–2006	Godoy Cruz	20	(1)
2006	Independiente Rivadavia	5	(0)
2007	Deportivo Guaymallén	6	(1)
2007	Gutiérrez		

Managerial career
- 2009: Fundación Godoy Cruz
- 2009–2010: Luján de Cuyo
- 2010–2011: Gutiérrez
- 2011–2012: Andes Talleres
- 2012–2013: Deportivo Guaymallén
- 2015–2017: Gutiérrez
- 2018–2019: Huracán Las Heras
- 2020–2021: Olimpo
- 2021–2022: San Martín Mendoza
- 2022–2024: Huracán Las Heras
- * Club domestic league appearances and goals

Juan Alejandro Abaurre (born September 11, 1972, in Mendoza, Argentina) is an Argentine football manager and former player who played as a forward for clubs in Argentina, Switzerland and Chile.

== Teams ==
- Godoy Cruz 1990–1991
- Racing Club 1991
- FC Basel 1992–1993
- Deportes Concepción 1993
- Godoy Cruz 1994–1997
- Palestino 1997–1998
- Godoy Cruz 1998–2002
- Olimpo 2002–2003
- Quilmes 2003
- San Martín de Mendoza 2003–2004
- Godoy Cruz 2005–2006
- Independiente Rivadavia 2006
- Deportivo Guaymallén 2007
- Gutiérrez 2007

== Titles ==
- Godoy Cruz Antonio Tomba – 1990 Liga Mendocina de Fútbol
- Godoy Cruz Antonio Tomba – 1993/94 Torneo del Interior
- Godoy Cruz Antonio Tomba – 2005 Torneo Apertura B Nacional
