= Jorge Detona =

Argentine footballer

Personal information
- Full name: Jorge Daniel Detona
- Date of birth: 21 May 1986 (age 40)
- Place of birth: Buenos Aires, Argentina
- Height: 1.82 m (6 ft 0 in)
- Position: Forward

Senior career*
| Years | Team | Apps | (Gls) |
- Club Social y Deportivo Federacion
| 2007 | Colegiales (Argentina) | | |
| 2008 | Deportivo Maipú | 1 | (0) |
| 2008 | Guaymallén | 22 | (3) |
- Andes Talleres
| 2010 | Naval | 3 | (1) |
| 2011 | Colegiales (Argentina) | | |
| 2011-2012 | Huracan Las Heras | 27 | (7) |
| 2012-2013 | Andes Talleres | 25 | (9) |
| 2013-2014 | Alianza Coronel Moldes | 15 | (1) |
| 2014 | Nacional Potosí | 3 | (0) |
| 2015-2016 | Güemes | 30 | (13) |
| 2016 | Juventud Alianza | 9 | (2) |
| 2017 | Olmedo | | (19) |
| 2018 | Gualaceo | | (10) |
| 2019 | Manta | | (5) |
| 2020 | Olmedo | 8 | (1) |
- * Club domestic league appearances and goals

Jorge Daniel Detona (born 21 May 1986) is an Argentine footballer who is last known to have played as a forward for Olmedo.

== Career ==
At the age of 15, Detona debuted for Club Social y Deportivo Federacion in the Argentine sixth division.

Before the 2008 season, he signed for Argentine third division side Deportivo Maipú.

Before the 2010 season, he signed for Naval in the Chilean second division after playing for Argentine fifth division club Andes Talleres but left due to the 2010 Chile earthquake.

In 2014, Detona signed for Nacional Potosí in the Bolivian top flight after playing for Argentine fourth division team Alianza Coronel Moldes, where he made 3 league appearances and scored 0 goals.

Before the 2017 season, he signed for Olmedo in Ecuador after playing for Argentine fourth division outfit Juventud Alianza.

In 2018, Detona signed for Gualaceo in the Ecuadorian second division after almost signing for DPMM, Brunei's most successful club.

In 2020, he signed for Olmedo in the Ecuadorian top flight, where he made 8 league appearances and scored 1 goal.
