= Cristian Lucero =

Cristian Lucero may refer to:

- Cristian Lucero (footballer, born 1987), Argentine forward
- Cristian Lucero (footballer, born 1988), Argentine forward
