= Juan Lucero =

Juan Lucero may refer to:

- Juan Lucero (bishop) (died 1362), Spanish bishop
- Juan Martín Lucero (born 1991), Argentine footballer
- Juan Manuel Lucero (born 1985), Argentine naturalized Chilean former footballer
- Emanuel Lucero (born 1995), Argentine footballer, full name Juan Emanuel Lucero
