= Ubeda (surname) =

Ubeda or Úbeda is a surname. Notable people with the surname include:

- Carlos Vázquez Úbeda (1869–1944), Spanish painter and illustrator
- Claudio Úbeda (born 1969), Argentine football manager
- Jesús Hernández Úbeda (1959–1996), Spanish racing cyclist
- Juan Pablo Úbeda (born 1980), Chilean former footballer
- Luisa Fernanda Rudi Úbeda (born 1950), Spanish politician
- Perry Ubeda (born 1961), Dutch former super middleweight kickboxer
- Ricky Ubeda (born 1995/1996), American dancer
- Santiago Úbeda (born 1996), Argentine footballer

== See also ==
- Rigoberto Cruz, who is known by the pseudonym Pablo Ubeda
