= Lucero =

Lucero may refer to:

- Lucero (given name) a Spanish given name
- Lucero (surname) a Spanish surname
- Lucero (entertainer) (born 1969), Mexican singer and actress
  - Lucero (album), eponymous album released in 1993
- Lucero (band), an American alt country band
- Lucero (Madrid), a ward (barrio) of Madrid, Spain
  - Lucero (Madrid Metro), a station on Line 6
- Lucero sheep, a Criollo sheep breed
- "Lucero", fan-fic short story set in the RP1 fictional universe, by Andy Weir, and canonized into the 2016 edition of Ready Player One
- Cerro del Lucero, mountain in the Province of Granada in southern Spain
