= Maximiliano Meza =

Maximiliano Meza may refer to:

- Maximiliano Meza (footballer, born 1992), Argentine international midfielder
- Maximiliano Meza (footballer, born 1997), Argentine midfielder
