= Pablo Palacio =

Pablo Palacio may refer to:

- Pablo Palacio (footballer), Argentine professional footballer
- Pablo Palacio (writer), Ecuadorian writer

== See also ==
- Pablo Palacios, Ecuadorian footballer
