= Perdóname =

Perdóname may refer to:

== Music ==
- Perdóname (Eddy Lover album)
- Perdóname, album by David Civera, 2005
- Perdóname, album by Isaías Lucero, 2010

=== Songs ===
- "Perdoname" (Ricky Martin song), 2015
- "Perdoname" (Demis Roussos song), 1975
- "Perdoname" (La Factoría song), featuring Eddy Lover, 2007
- "Perdoname" (Pablo Alborán song), 2011
- "Perdóname", by Amaral from Gato negro dragón rojo, 2008
- "Perdóname", by Bertin Osborne, 1983
- "Perdóname", by norteño music group Bronco from album Sin Riendas
- "Perdóname", by Camilo Sesto, 1980
- "Perdóname", by Carlos & Alejanda from La Introducción, 2009
- "Perdóname", by Texan band Del Castillo featuring Carl Thiel and Erik Hokkanen from album Brotherhood, 2006
- "Perdóname", by Demis Roussos
- "Perdóname", by Deorro
- "Perdóname", by Dúo Dinámico, 1960s
- "Perdóname", by El Trono de Mexico from album Que Bonita Es la Vida
- "Perdóname", from the film Emilia Pérez
- "Perdóname", by Fausto Rey
- "Perdóname", by Gilberto Santa Rosa from Punto de Vista
- "Perdóname", by Kairo, 1994
- "Perdóname", by La Oreja de Van Gogh from the album Lo Que te Conté Mientras te Hacías la Dormida, 2003
- "Perdóname", by Limi-T 21
- "Perdóname", by Lucía Méndez, 1999
- "Perdóname", by Luciano Pereyra, 2004
- "Perdóname", by Luis Fonsi from Comenzaré, 1998
- "Perdóname", Spanish version of "All by Myself" by Luis Miguel from the album Soy Como Quiero Ser, 1987
- "Perdóname", by Luis Segura
- "Perdóname", by Nena Daconte with Argentinian composer Coti
- "Perdóname", by Pat Boone, 1958
- "Perdóname", by Raymix
- "Perdóname", by Robert Ledesma from album El Bolero Sentimientos de Hombre y Mujer
- "Perdóname", by Selena from Selena Live!
- "Perdóname", by Yahir

== See also ==
- Perdóname Todo, a 1995 film directed by Raul Araiza
- "Perdóname, perdóname", song Daniel Velázquez from Spain in the Eurovision Song Contest 1976 final
- "Perdóname Otra Vez", song by Yolandita Monge from Historia de Amour 1981
- "Perdóname Mi Amor", song by Conjunto Primavera nominated for Premio Lo Nuestro 2003
- "Perdóname en Silencio", song by Reyli from Fe (Reyli album)
