= Lucas Fernández =

Lucas Fernández may refer to:

- Lucas Fernández (footballer, born 1988), Argentine defender
- Lucas Fernández (footballer, born 1999), Argentine forward
- Lucas Fernández (musician) (born 1474), Spanish dramatist and musician
