= Cristian Aracena =

Argentine footballer (born 1987)

Personal information
- Full name: Cristian Roberto Aracena
- Date of birth: 8 February 1987 (age 39)
- Place of birth: Mendoza, Argentina
- Height: 1.80 m (5 ft 11 in)
- Position: Goalkeeper

Team information
- Current team: Almagro

Youth career
- Godoy Cruz

Senior career*
Years	Team	Apps	(Gls)
2005–2013	Godoy Cruz	0	(0)
2007	→ Gimnasia y Esgrima (loan)	3	(0)
2010	→ Sportivo Italiano (loan)	0	(0)
2010	→ 9 de Julio (loan)	0	(0)
2011	→ Deportivo Maipú (loan)	7	(0)
2011–2012	→ Gimnasia y Esgrima (loan)	20	(0)
2012–2014	→ Deportivo Guaymallén (loan)	49	(0)
2014–2015	Gutiérrez	58	(0)
2016–2021	Independiente Rivadavia	169	(0)
2022–	Almagro	4	(0)
- * Club domestic league appearances and goals as of 21:13, 10 March 2022 (UTC)

Cristian Roberto Aracena (born 8 February 1987) is an Argentine professional footballer who plays as a goalkeeper for Club Almagro.

== Career ==
Godoy Cruz were the first club of Aracena's career. He was contracted with them between 2005 and 2013 but didn't make a senior league appearance, spending the vast majority of his time out on loan. Aracena's opening loan spell was to Gimnasia y Esgrima of Torneo Argentino A, where he featured three times in 2007. A stint with fellow third tier Sportivo Italiano followed three years later in 2010, which preceded Aracena joining Primera B Nacional's 9 de Julio midway through the year on 30 June. No appearances were made for either of the two teams. Deportivo Maipú loaned Aracena in January 2011.

Having appeared in seven fixtures for Deportivo Maipú, Aracena sealed a return to Gimnasia y Esgrima on 30 June 2011. Twelve months after, Aracena signed his final loan away from Godoy Cruz by moving to Deportivo Guaymallén. He remained for two years in Torneo Argentino B/Torneo Federal B, making a total of forty-nine appearances. On 28 February 2014, Aracena agreed to join Gutiérrez. Gutiérrez won promotion to Torneo Federal A in his first campaign. January 2016 saw Aracena complete a free transfer to Independiente Rivadavia. He made his professional bow in February versus Instituto.

== Career statistics ==
As of 28 January 2019.

Club statistics
Club	Season	League			Cup		Continental		Other		Total	
Club	Season	Division	Apps	Goals	Apps	Goals	Apps	Goals	Apps	Goals	Apps	Goals
Godoy Cruz	2005–06	Primera B Nacional	0	0	0	0	—		0	0	0	0
Godoy Cruz	2006–07	Primera División	0	0	0	0	—		0	0	0	0
Godoy Cruz	2007–08	Primera División	0	0	0	0	—		0	0	0	0
Godoy Cruz	2008–09	Primera División	0	0	0	0	—		0	0	0	0
Godoy Cruz	2009–10	Primera División	0	0	0	0	—		0	0	0	0
Godoy Cruz	2010–11	Primera División	0	0	0	0	0	0	0	0	0	0
Godoy Cruz	2011–12	Primera División	0	0	0	0	0	0	0	0	0	0
Godoy Cruz	2012–13	Primera División	0	0	0	0	—		0	0	0	0
Godoy Cruz	2013–14	Primera División	0	0	0	0	—		0	0	0	0
Godoy Cruz	Total		0	0	0	0	0	0	0	0	0	0
Sportivo Italiano (loan)	2009–10	Primera B Nacional	0	0	0	0	—		0	0	0	0
9 de Julio (loan)	2010–11	Torneo Argentino A	0	0	0	0	—		0	0	0	0
Deportivo Maipú (loan)	2010–11	Torneo Argentino A	7	0	0	0	—		0	0	7	0
Gimnasia y Esgrima (loan)	2011–12	Torneo Argentino B	20	0	0	0	—		0	0	20	0
Gutiérrez	2015	Torneo Federal A	29	0	0	0	—		1 (Note: Appearance(s) in the Torneo Federal A play-offs)	0	30	0
Independiente Rivadavia	2016	Primera B Nacional	14	0	0	0	—		0	0	14	0
Independiente Rivadavia	2016–17	Primera B Nacional	44	0	0	0	—		0	0	44	0
Independiente Rivadavia	2017–18	Primera B Nacional	24	0	0	0	—		0	0	24	0
Independiente Rivadavia	2018–19	Primera B Nacional	13	0	0	0	—		0	0	13	0
Independiente Rivadavia	Total		95	0	0	0	—		0	0	95	0
Career total			151	0	0	0	0	0	1	0	152	0
