= Juan Manuel Barrera =

Argentine footballer

Personal information
- Date of birth: 28 June 1991 (age 35)
- Place of birth: Dorrego, Argentina
- Height: 1.70 m (5 ft 7 in)
- Position: Centre-back

Team information
- Current team: Nissa
- Number: 6

Senior career*
Years	Team	Apps	(Gls)
2007–2011	Andes Talleres		
2011–2014	Godoy Cruz	0	(0)
2015	Unión Mar del Plata	18	(0)
2016	Independiente Rivadavia	1	(0)
2016–2017	Gutiérrez	23	(2)
2017–2019	Independiente Rivadavia	8	(0)
2019–2020	Huracán Las Heras	16	(0)
2020–2022	Martina		
2022–2023	Akragas		
2023–	Nissa	8	(1)
- * Club domestic league appearances and goals as of 17 November 2024

Juan Manuel Barrera (born 28 June 1991) is an Argentine professional footballer who plays as a centre-back for Italian Serie D club Nissa.

== Career ==
Barrera started his career without any youth stints, as he joined Liga Mendocina team Andes Talleres at the age of sixteen. Godoy Cruz were Barrera's next club, though the defender didn't feature for the club; he was, however, a substitute three times in league and cup. In January 2015, Barrera signed for Unión Mar del Plata of Primera B Nacional. He made eighteen appearances for them in 2015 as they were relegated to Torneo Federal A. Barrera remained in the second tier with Independiente Rivadavia. A sole appearance against Nueva Chicago on 5 March 2016 preceded a move to Torneo Federal A's Gutiérrez.

For Gutiérrez, he netted goals versus Gimnasia y Esgrima and San Lorenzo in 2016–17 as they reached phase four of the play-offs. Barrera rejoined Independiente Rivadavia of Primera B Nacional on 18 August 2017. The centre-back remained for two years, though only featured nine times in total; including just once, in the Copa Argentina, in 2018–19. Barrera headed to Torneo Federal A in July 2019 with Huracán Las Heras, with eighteen appearances and one goal (versus Deportivo Maipú in the cup) following. August 2020 saw Barrera move abroad for the first time, joining Italian Eccellenza Apulia side Martina.

== Career statistics ==
As of 18 December 2020.

Club statistics
Club	Season	League			Cup		League Cup		Continental		Other		Total	
Club	Season	Division	Apps	Goals	Apps	Goals	Apps	Goals	Apps	Goals	Apps	Goals	Apps	Goals
Godoy Cruz	2013–14	Primera División	0	0	0	0	—		—		0	0	0	0
Godoy Cruz	2014	Primera División	0	0	0	0	—		0	0	0	0	0	0
Godoy Cruz	Total		0	0	0	0	—		0	0	0	0	0	0
Unión Mar del Plata	2015	Primera B Nacional	18	0	0	0	—		—		0	0	18	0
Independiente Rivadavia	2016	Primera B Nacional	1	0	0	0	—		—		0	0	1	0
Gutiérrez	2016–17	Torneo Federal A	23	2	0	0	—		—		6 (Note: Appearance(s) in the Torneo Federal A play-offs)	0	29	2
Independiente Rivadavia	2017–18	Primera B Nacional	8	0	0	0	—		—		0	0	8	0
Independiente Rivadavia	2018–19	Primera B Nacional	0	0	1	0	—		—		0	0	1	0
Independiente Rivadavia	Total		8	0	1	0	—		—		0	0	9	0
Huracán Las Heras	2019–20	Torneo Federal A	16	0	2	1	—		—		0	0	18	1
Career total			66	2	3	1	0	0	0	0	6	0	75	2

== Honours ==
Andes Talleres

- Liga Mendocina: 2009, 2011
