= Ignacio Irañeta =

Argentine footballer (born 1987)

Personal information
- Full name: Ignacio José Irañeta
- Date of birth: 24 February 1987 (age 39)
- Place of birth: Mendoza, Argentina
- Height: 1.71 m (5 ft 7 1/2 in)
- Position: Forward

Senior career*
Years	Team	Apps	(Gls)
2006–2007	Gimnasia y Esgrima	2	(0)
2009	Argentino	6	(0)
2010	Centro Deportivo Rivadavia		
2010–2012	San Martín	14	(2)
2013	Deportivo Guaymallén	15	(0)
2013–2014	Leonardo Murialdo	8	(1)
2014–2015	Gutiérrez	28	(3)
2016–2021	Independiente Rivadavia	57	(4)
- * Club domestic league appearances and goals as of 22:00, 11 March 2022 (UTC)

Ignacio José Irañeta (born 24 February 1987) is an Argentine professional footballer who plays as a forward.

== Career ==
Irañeta's senior career started in 2006 with Gimnasia y Esgrima, appearing two times in the 2006–07 Torneo Argentino A. 2009 saw Argentino sign Irañeta. Subsequent stints with Centro Deportivo Rivadavia, San Martín, Deportivo Guaymallén and Leonardo Murialdo followed between 2010 and 2014; with the forward making over thirty appearances for those teams across Torneo Argentino B, Torneo Federal B and Torneo Argentino C. On 30 June 2014, Irañeta joined Gutiérrez of the fourth tier. One goal in ten fixtures arrived in the 2014 campaign for the club, which ended with promotion via the third stage play-offs.

In January 2016, Irañeta completed a move to Independiente Rivadavia of Primera B Nacional. He made his professional league debut during a goalless draw with Villa Dálmine on 31 January, which was his only match in 2016. Thirty-one appearances followed in the next two seasons, with Irañeta netting his opening pro goals in the process against Estudiantes, Nueva Chicago and Quilmes.

== Personal life ==
In January 2019, Irañeta was charged with the alleged sexual abuse of his three-year-old niece after he abstained from testifying. After being a fugitive for almost a month, Irañeta appeared in court before being released on bail until final sentencing. However, Irañeta claimed his innocence in March. It was also revealed he offered to terminate his Independiente Rivadavia contract, though the club denied his request. He returned to action for the first time since the accusation, featuring in a league fixture with Guillermo Brown on 7 April.

== Career statistics ==
As of 8 April 2019.

Club statistics
Club	Season	League			Cup		Continental		Other		Total	
Club	Season	Division	Apps	Goals	Apps	Goals	Apps	Goals	Apps	Goals	Apps	Goals
Gimnasia y Esgrima	2006–07	Torneo Argentino A	2	0	0	0	—		0	0	2	0
Argentino	2009–10	Torneo Argentino B	6	0	0	0	—		0	0	6	0
Deportivo Guaymallén	2012–13	Torneo Argentino B	15	0	0	0	—		0	0	15	0
Leonardo Murialdo	2013–14	Torneo Argentino B	8	1	0	0	—		0	0	8	1
Gutiérrez	2014	Torneo Federal B	10	1	0	0	—		0	0	10	1
Gutiérrez	2015	Torneo Federal A	18	2	0	0	—		1 (Note: Appearance(s) in the Torneo Federal A play-offs)	0	19	2
Gutiérrez	Total		28	3	0	0	—		1	0	29	3
Independiente Rivadavia	2016	Primera B Nacional	1	0	0	0	—		0	0	1	0
Independiente Rivadavia	2016–17	Primera B Nacional	21	2	1	0	—		0	0	22	2
Independiente Rivadavia	2017–18	Primera B Nacional	10	1	0	0	—		0	0	10	1
Independiente Rivadavia	2018–19	Primera B Nacional	10	0	0	0	—		0	0	10	0
Independiente Rivadavia	Total		42	3	1	0	—		0	0	43	3
Career total			101	7	1	0	—		1	0	103	7
