= Lucero (given name) =

Lucero is a given name. Notable people with the name include

== Female given name ==
- Lucero (entertainer) (born Lucero Hogaza León, 1969), Mexican entertainer
- Lucero Cuevas (born 1996), Mexican footballer
- Lucero Soto (born 1948), Mexican badminton player
- Lucero Miroslava Montemayor Gracia (born 1990), Mexican beauty pageant titleholder and sportscaster

== Male given name ==
- Lucero Álvarez (born 1985), Uruguayan footballer
- Lucero Suárez (born 1963), Mexican producer

== See also ==
- Lucero (disambiguation)
- Lucero (surname)
- Lucero (band)
