= Bruno Sepúlveda =

Argentine footballer

Personal information
- Full name: Bruno Christian Sepúlveda
- Date of birth: 17 September 1992 (age 34)
- Place of birth: Viedma, Argentina
- Height: 1.87 m (6 ft 2 in)
- Position: Forward

Team information
- Current team: Platense
- Number: 79

Youth career
- Peña Azul y Oro

Senior career*
Years	Team	Apps	(Gls)
2011–2013	Peña Azul y Oro		
2013	Sol de Mayo (V)		
2013–2014	Atlético Regina	19	(5)
2014–2015	Sol de Mayo (V)		
2015	Juventud Unida Universitario	24	(5)
2016	Deportivo Roca	7	(1)
2016–2024	Estudiantes RC	90	(32)
2021	→ Arsenal Sarandí (loan)	29	(6)
2022–2023	→ Barracas Central (loan)	66	(14)
2024–2026	Banfield	59	(14)
2026–	Platense	7	(1)
- * Club domestic league appearances and goals as of 17:20, 22 November 2026 (UTC)

Bruno Christian Sepúlveda (born 17 September 1992) is an Argentine professional footballer who plays as a forward for Platense.

== Career ==
Having debuted in Torneo Argentino C with Peña Azul y Oro, Sepúlveda headed to Torneo Argentino B outfit Sol de Mayo in 2013. Midway through the year, the forward moved across the division to Atlético Regina. He scored five goals in nineteen matches for them, before departing to rejoin Sol de Mayo for the 2014 and 2015 campaigns; where he took his overall tally for the club to twenty-three goals in twenty-nine fixtures. Sepúlveda left during the latter campaign, as he penned terms with Torneo Federal A's Juventud Unida Universitario. He debuted in a 1–1 draw with Independiente de Chivilcoy on 24 March 2015.

After scoring his first goals for El Juve on 19 April in a 3–0 victory over Defensores de Belgrano, he went on to net three further times as they gained promotion. Ahead of January 2016, Sepúlveda signed a contract with fellow third tier team Deportivo Roca. He appeared seven times for Río Negro Province club, scoring once in a 4–1 loss away to Villa Mitre on 7 February. Sepúlveda returned to tier four, now known as Torneo Federal B, in June 2016 to join Estudiantes of Río Cuarto. Four goals in eighteen games came in his first season with El Celeste, as they secured promotion to Torneo Federal A for 2017–18.

Sepúlveda netted seventeen goals in two seasons in the third tier for Estudiantes, which culminated with the club securing a second promotion in four seasons as they won the 2018–19 title. He scored on his Primera B Nacional debut against Temperley on 16 August 2019, which was followed by October strikes against Guillermo Brown and Alvarado. On 1 December, Sepúlveda scored a hat-trick in a win away to Deportivo Morón. After scoring four from eight starts in 2020, Sepúlveda was signed on loan by Primera División side Arsenal de Sarandí in February 2021 for the rest of the year. He made his debut on 19 February versus Banfield.

On 15 January 2022, Sepúlveda joined Barracas Central on a paid loan deal with a purchase option, until the end of 2022.

== Career statistics ==
As of 21 February 2021.

Appearances and goals by club, season and competition
Club	Season	League			Cup		League Cup		Continental		Other		Total	
Club	Season	Division	Apps	Goals	Apps	Goals	Apps	Goals	Apps	Goals	Apps	Goals	Apps	Goals
Atlético Regina	2013–14	Torneo Argentino B	19	5	0	0	—		—		0	0	19	5
Juventud Unida Universitario	2015	Torneo Federal A	24	5	0	0	—		—		0	0	24	5
Deportivo Roca	2016	Torneo Federal A	7	1	0	0	—		—		0	0	7	1
Estudiantes	2016 (C)	Torneo Federal B	18	4	0	0	—		—		0	0	18	4
Estudiantes	2017–18	Torneo Federal A	20	6	1	0	—		—		0	0	21	6
Estudiantes	2018–19	Torneo Federal A	26	11	3	0	—		—		0	0	29	11
Estudiantes	2019–20	Primera Nacional	16	7	0	0	—		—		0	0	16	7
Estudiantes	2020	Primera Nacional	10	4	0	0	—		—		0	0	10	4
Estudiantes	Total		90	32	4	0	—		—		0	0	94	32
Arsenal de Sarandí	2021 (Note: Soccerway counts Copa de la Liga Profesional appearances as league appearances.)	Primera División	1	0	0	0	—		—		0	0	1	0
Career total			141	39	4	0	—		—		0	0	145	39

== Honours ==
Estudiantes

- Torneo Federal A: 2018–19
