= Rodrigo Ayala =

Argentine professional footballer

Personal information
- Full name: Rodrigo Elvio Ayala
- Date of birth: 11 August 1994 (age 32)
- Place of birth: Berazategui, Argentina
- Height: 1.79 m (5 ft 10 1/2 in)
- Position: Left-back

Team information
- Current team: Deportivo Madryn

Youth career
- 2004–2015: Estudiantes

Senior career*
Years	Team	Apps	(Gls)
2015–2017	Estudiantes	0	(0)
2016–2017	→ Los Andes (loan)	12	(0)
2017–2018	Villa San Carlos	14	(0)
2018–2019	Chacarita Juniors	12	(0)
2019–2020	Independiente Rivadavia	7	(0)
2020–2021	Sportivo Peñarol	6	(0)
2021–2022	Comunicaciones	33	(0)
2022–2023	Nueva Chicago	35	(0)
2023–2024	Mitre	17	(1)
2024–2025	San Telmo	40	(3)
2025–2026	Ferro Carril Oeste	31	(1)
2026–	Deportivo Madryn	7	(0)
- * Club domestic league appearances and goals as of 16:28, 27 April 2026 (UTC)

Rodrigo Elvio Ayala (born 11 August 1994) is an Argentine professional footballer who plays as a left-back for Deportivo Madryn.

== Career ==
Ayala's first club was Argentine Primera División side Estudiantes; however he didn't make an appearance for the club but was an unused substitute for a league match with Rosario Central on 17 April 2015. Whilst with Estudiantes, Ayala spent the 2016–17 season out on loan with Los Andes of Primera B Nacional.

He made his professional debut on 28 August 2016, playing the second half in an away win to Douglas Haig. Eleven further appearances followed in a season which Los Andes ended 13th. On 31 July 2017, Ayala left Estudiantes permanently to sign for Primera B Metropolitana team Villa San Carlos. He played fourteen times.

Ayala switched teams to recently relegated Primera B Nacional club Chacarita Juniors in July 2018.

== Career statistics ==
As of 6 September 2018.

Club statistics
Club	Season	League			Cup (Note: Includes the Copa Argentina)		League Cup		Continental (Note: Includes the Copa Libertadores and Copa Sudamericana)		Other		Total	
Club	Season	Division	Apps	Goals	Apps	Goals	Apps	Goals	Apps	Goals	Apps	Goals	Apps	Goals
Estudiantes	2015	Primera División	0	0	0	0	—		0	0	0	0	0	0
Estudiantes	2016	Primera División	0	0	0	0	—		0	0	0	0	0	0
Estudiantes	2016–17	Primera División	0	0	0	0	—		0	0	0	0	0	0
Estudiantes	Total		0	0	0	0	—		0	0	0	0	0	0
Los Andes (loan)	2016–17	Primera B Nacional	12	0	2	0	—		—		0	0	14	0
Villa San Carlos	2017–18	Primera B Metropolitana	14	0	0	0	—		—		0	0	14	0
Chacarita Juniors	2018–19	Primera B Nacional	2	0	0	0	—		—		0	0	2	0
Career total			28	0	2	0	—		0	0	0	0	30	0
