= Joaquín Mattalia =

Argentine footballer

Personal information
- Date of birth: 26 April 1992 (age 34)
- Place of birth: Etruria, Argentina
- Height: 1.87 m (6 ft 1 1/2 in)
- Position: Goalkeeper

Team information
- Current team: Unión Magdalena
- Number: 1

Youth career
- 2006–2008: Renato Cesarini
- 2008–2016: Boca Juniors

Senior career*
Years	Team	Apps	(Gls)
2016–2018	Almirante Brown	49	(0)
2018	Atenas	0	(0)
2018–2019	Independiente Rivadavia	0	(0)
2020	Almirante Brown	5	(0)
2020–2021	Sarmiento	0	(0)
2021	Chacarita Juniors	0	(0)
2021	Comunicaciones	9	(0)
2022	Chaco For Ever	0	(0)
2023–2025	Racing Córdoba	73	(0)
2025–	Unión Magdalena	18	(0)
- * Club domestic league appearances and goals as of 12 December 2025

Joaquín Mattalia (born 26 April 1992) is an Argentine professional footballer who plays as a goalkeeper for Colombian club Unión Magdalena.

== Career ==
Mattalia started out in the youth system of Renato Cesarini in 2006, leaving two years later to Boca Juniors; they selected him on the bench three times at the 2012 U-20 Copa Libertadores in Peru; which they won. His departure from the club was completed in 2016, with Primera B Metropolitana side Almirante Brown signing Mattalia. He made his professional debut during a victory away to Talleres on 29 November, which was the first of forty-nine matches across 2016–17 and 2017–18. Mattalia signed with Uruguay's Atenas in July 2018, but terminated his contract in August to go to Independiente Rivadavia.

After zero appearances in Primera B Nacional for Independiente in eighteen months, Mattalia departed at the end of 2019 and subsequently rejoined Almirante Brown in Primera B Metropolitana. He'd play five matches for them, prior to the season's curtailment due to the COVID-19 pandemic. August 2020 saw Mattalia head to Torneo Federal A side Sarmiento.

== Personal life ==
Pablo Mattalia is the brother of Joaquín, he is a fellow professional footballer.

== Career statistics ==
As of 6 September 2020.

Club statistics
Club	Season	League			Cup		Continental		Other		Total	
Club	Season	Division	Apps	Goals	Apps	Goals	Apps	Goals	Apps	Goals	Apps	Goals
Almirante Brown	2016–17	Primera B Metropolitana	16	0	0	0	—		0	0	16	0
Almirante Brown	2017–18	Primera B Metropolitana	33	0	0	0	—		0	0	33	0
Almirante Brown	Total		49	0	0	0	—		0	0	49	0
Atenas	2018	Primera División	0	0	—		—		0	0	0	0
Independiente Rivadavia	2018–19	Primera B Nacional	0	0	0	0	—		0	0	0	0
Independiente Rivadavia	2019–20	Primera B Nacional	0	0	0	0	—		0	0	0	0
Independiente Rivadavia	Total		0	0	0	0	—		0	0	0	0
Almirante Brown	2019–20	Primera B Metropolitana	5	0	0	0	—		0	0	5	0
Sarmiento	2020–21	Torneo Federal A	0	0	0	0	—		0	0	0	0
Career total			54	0	0	0	—		0	0	54	0

== Honours ==
Boca Juniors

- U-20 Copa Libertadores: 2012
