= Nicolás Rinaldi =

Argentine footballer

Personal information
- Full name: Nicolás Rinaldi
- Date of birth: 23 August 1993 (age 33)
- Place of birth: General Lamadrid, Argentina
- Height: 1.85 m (6 ft 1 in)
- Position: Midfielder

Team information
- Current team: Gimnasia y Tiro

Senior career*
Years	Team	Apps	(Gls)
2011–2014	Rivadavia (LIN)	0	(0)
2013–2014	→ Rangers (loan)	2	(0)
2015–2016	Ferro Carril Oeste	34	(5)
2016–2017	Sarmiento	22	(2)
2017–2018	Flandria	31	(4)
2018–2020	Alvarado	9	(1)
2020–2022	Estudiantes BA	33	(6)
2022–2023	Cienciano	32	(5)
2023–2024	Deportivo Cuenca	27	(1)
2024–2025	Gimnasia Mendoza	31	(0)
2025–	Gimnasia y Tiro	44	(6)
- * Club domestic league appearances and goals as of 18:08, 28 April 2026 (UTC)

Nicolás Rinaldi (born 23 August 1993) is an Argentine football player who currently plays for Gimnasia y Tiro.
