= Martín Lucero =

Argentine footballer

Personal information
- Date of birth: 23 May 1990 (age 36)
- Place of birth: Buenos Aires, Argentina
- Height: 1.87 m (6 ft 1 1/2 in)
- Position: Midfielder

Team information
- Current team: Colegiales

Youth career
- Sportivo Belgrano
- 2009–2010: Colegiales

Senior career*
| Years | Team | Apps | (Gls) |
| 2010 | Figueirense | | |
| 2011 | Pelotas | | |
| 2012 | Palmeiras | 0 | (0) |
| 2012 | Grêmio Barueri | 4 | (0) |
| 2013 | Sorocaba | 0 | (0) |
| 2013–2014 | Sportivo Belgrano | 0 | (0) |
| 2014–2019 | Colegiales | 65 | (10) |
| 2016–2018 | → Banfield (loan) | 21 | (0) |
| 2018–2019 | → Chacarita Juniors (loan) | 12 | (0) |
| 2020 | Deportes Copiapó | 0 | (0) |
| 2020– | Colegiales | 0 | (0) |
- * Club domestic league appearances and goals as of 14:36, 10 October 2020 (UTC)

Martín Lucero (born 23 May 1990) is an Argentine professional footballer who plays as a midfielder for Colegiales.

== Career ==
Lucero's career began with Argentine clubs Sportivo Belgrano and Colegiales, prior to making a move to Brazilian football to sign for Figueirense. He had subsequent spells with Pelotas, Palmeiras, Grêmio Barueri and Sorocaba. He returned to Argentine football in 2013 to join former club Sportivo Belgrano, who were now playing in Primera B Nacional. A year later, in 2014, Lucero signed for Colegiales, another of his ex-teams. He made his Primera B Metropolitana debut on 9 August in a loss against Tristán Suárez. On 19 August 2016, Lucero completed a loan to Argentine Primera División side Banfield.

His first Argentine top-flight appearance came in October 2016 against Defensa y Justicia. Lucero returned to Colegiales in June 2018, but was immediately loaned back out to join Chacarita Juniors. He remained until December 2019, though spent the final five months there injured. In early 2020, Lucero moved to Chile with Primera B's Deportes Copiapó. He never made a competitive appearance for them due to the COVID-19 pandemic, though was an unused substitute on 13 March for a league match with Deportes Puerto Montt. September 2020 saw Lucero rejoin Colegiales.

== Career statistics ==
As of 10 October 2020.

Club statistics
| Club | Season | League | | | Cup | | League Cup | | Continental | | Other | | Total | |
| Club | Season | Division | Apps | Goals | Apps | Goals | Apps | Goals | Apps | Goals | Apps | Goals | Apps | Goals |
|---|---|---|---|---|---|---|---|---|---|---|---|---|---|---|
| Colegiales | 2014 | Primera B Metropolitana | 15 | 4 | 0 | 0 | — | | — | | 0 | 0 | 15 | 4 |
| Colegiales | 2015 | Primera B Metropolitana | 34 | 5 | 0 | 0 | — | | — | | 0 | 0 | 34 | 5 |
| Colegiales | 2016 | Primera B Metropolitana | 16 | 1 | 0 | 0 | — | | — | | 0 | 0 | 16 | 1 |
| Colegiales | 2016–17 | Primera B Metropolitana | 0 | 0 | 0 | 0 | — | | — | | 0 | 0 | 0 | 0 |
| Colegiales | 2017–18 | Primera B Metropolitana | 0 | 0 | 0 | 0 | — | | — | | 0 | 0 | 0 | 0 |
| Colegiales | 2018–19 | Primera B Metropolitana | 0 | 0 | 0 | 0 | — | | — | | 0 | 0 | 0 | 0 |
| Colegiales | 2019–20 | Primera B Metropolitana | 0 | 0 | 0 | 0 | — | | — | | 0 | 0 | 0 | 0 |
| Colegiales | Total | | 65 | 10 | 0 | 0 | — | | — | | 0 | 0 | 65 | 10 |
| Banfield (loan) | 2016–17 | Primera División | 12 | 0 | 1 | 0 | — | | 0 | 0 | 0 | 0 | 13 | 0 |
| Banfield (loan) | 2017–18 | Primera División | 9 | 0 | 0 | 0 | — | | 0 | 0 | 0 | 0 | 9 | 0 |
| Banfield (loan) | Total | | 21 | 0 | 1 | 0 | — | | 0 | 0 | 0 | 0 | 22 | 0 |
| Chacarita Juniors (loan) | 2018–19 | Primera B Nacional | 12 | 0 | 0 | 0 | — | | — | | 0 | 0 | 12 | 0 |
| Chacarita Juniors (loan) | 2019–20 | Primera B Nacional | 0 | 0 | 0 | 0 | — | | — | | 0 | 0 | 0 | 0 |
| Chacarita Juniors (loan) | Total | | 12 | 0 | 0 | 0 | — | | — | | 0 | 0 | 12 | 0 |
| Deportes Copiapó | 2020 | Primera B | 0 | 0 | 0 | 0 | — | | — | | 0 | 0 | 0 | 0 |
| Colegiales | 2020–21 | Primera B Metropolitana | 0 | 0 | 0 | 0 | — | | — | | 0 | 0 | 0 | 0 |
| Career total | | | 98 | 10 | 1 | 0 | — | | 0 | 0 | 0 | 0 | 99 | 10 |
