= Nicolás Ferreyra (footballer, born 1993) =

Argentine footballer

Personal information
- Full name: Nicolás Agustín Ferreyra
- Date of birth: 30 March 1993 (age 33)
- Place of birth: Rio Cuarto, Argentina
- Height: 1.94 m (6 ft 4 in)
- Position: Defender

Team information
- Current team: San Martín Tucumán

Senior career*
Years	Team	Apps	(Gls)
2013–2018	Belgrano	10	(0)
2015–2016	→ San Marcos (loan)	29	(2)
2017	→ Audax Italiano (loan)	6	(1)
2018	Cuneo	8	(0)
2019	Bolívar	2	(0)
2019	Sportivo Atenas	15	(5)
2020–2024	Estudiantes RC	12	(1)
2021	→ Rosario Central (loan)	23	(1)
2022	→ Barracas Central (loan)	33	(3)
2023	→ Bolívar (loan)	23	(1)
2024	→ Unión La Calera (loan)	9	(0)
2025	Deportes La Serena	24	(1)
2026–	San Martín Tucumán	11	(3)
- * Club domestic league appearances and goals as of 17:19, 4 May 2026 (UTC)

Nicolás Agustín Ferreyra (born 30 March 1993 in Río Cuarto (Córdoba), Argentina) is an Argentine professional footballer who plays as a centre-back for San Martín de Tucumán.

== Career ==
In 2024, Ferreyra returned to Chile and joined Unión La Calera from Bolívar. The next year, he switched to Deportes La Serena.

Back to Argentina, Ferreyra joined San Martín de Tucumán in January 2026.

=== Clubs ===
- Belgrano de Córdoba 2012–2018
- San Marcos de Arica 2015 (loan)
- Audax Italiano 2017 (loan)
- Rosario Central
