= Hernán Soria =

Argentine footballer

Personal information
- Full name: Hernán Guillermo Soria
- Date of birth: 17 June 1997 (age 29)
- Place of birth: Argentina
- Height: 1.92 m (6 ft 4 in)
- Position: Centre-forward

Youth career
- 2004–2015: Independiente Rivadavia

Senior career*
Years	Team	Apps	(Gls)
2015–2020	Independiente Rivadavia	5	(0)
2016	→ Luján de Cuyo (loan)	7	(0)
2016	→ Jorge Newbery (loan)	4	(0)
2020	→ La Consulta (loan)	3	(1)
2020	→ Sol de Mayo (loan)	3	(0)
2020–2021	Juventud Unida	9	(0)
2021	San Martín de Mendoza	4	(0)
- * Club domestic league appearances and goals as of 22:07, 11 March 2022 (UTC)

Hernán Guillermo Soria (born 17 June 1997) is an Argentine professional footballer who plays as a centre-forward.

== Career ==
Soria came through the youth system of Independiente Rivadavia, having signed with the club in 2004. He was moved into the senior set-up during the 2015 Primera B Nacional campaign, with Pablo Quinteros selecting Soria off the bench five times throughout. He played a total of one hundred and seven minutes in matches against Guaraní Antonio Franco, Atlético Paraná, Juventud Unida, Patronato and All Boys as they placed sixth. In 2016, Soria was sent out on loan to two Torneo Federal B clubs. Initially to Luján de Cuyo, where he featured seven times, and then to Jorge Newbery where he appeared in four games.

Soria didn't feature upon his return to Independiente, though was once on the substitutes bench for a Primera B Nacional match with Guillermo Brown on 8 April 2019. Ahead of January 2020, Soria departed to join La Consulta of Torneo Regional Federal Amateur on loan. He scored one goal in three fixtures, prior to terminating his stay there in order to sign for Torneo Federal A side Sol de Mayo on temporary terms. He appeared off the bench in matches against Deportivo Camioneros, Deportivo Maipú and Cipolletti in a season that was ended early due to the COVID-19 pandemic. After his stint with Sol de Mayo following the pandemic, Soria joined Juventud Unida San Luis on loan, where he played 13 matches, alternating between starting and coming off the bench. He then returned to Independiente Rivadavia before heading out on loan again to San Martín de Mendoza, where he competed in the 2021 Regional Amateur League. Soria then retired from the field for three years, and in June 2025, he joined Deportivo Guaymallen, where he played in the Mendoza League with such strong performances that, starting in 2026, he was able to join Deportivo Rincón de los Sauces, where he currently competes in the Federal A Tournament.

== Career statistics ==
As of 2 September 2020.

Appearances and goals by club, season and competition
Club	Season	League			Cup		Continental		Other		Total	
Club	Season	Division	Apps	Goals	Apps	Goals	Apps	Goals	Apps	Goals	Apps	Goals
Independiente Rivadavia	2015	Primera B Nacional	5	0	0	0	—		0	0	5	0
Independiente Rivadavia	2016	Primera B Nacional	0	0	0	0	—		0	0	0	0
Independiente Rivadavia	2016–17	Primera B Nacional	0	0	0	0	—		0	0	0	0
Independiente Rivadavia	2017–18	Primera B Nacional	0	0	0	0	—		0	0	0	0
Independiente Rivadavia	2018–19	Primera B Nacional	0	0	0	0	—		0	0	0	0
Independiente Rivadavia	2019–20	Primera B Nacional	0	0	0	0	—		0	0	0	0
Independiente Rivadavia	Total		5	0	0	0	—		0	0	5	0
Luján de Cuyo (loan)	2016	Torneo Federal B	7	0	0	0	—		0	0	7	0
Jorge Newbery (loan)	2016 (C)	Torneo Federal B	4	0	0	0	—		0	0	4	0
La Consulta (loan)	2016	Torneo Amateur	3	1	0	0	—		0	0	3	1
Sol de Mayo (loan)	2016	Torneo Federal A	3	0	0	0	—		0	0	3	0
Career total			22	1	0	0	—		0	0	22	1
