= Yair Marín =

Argentine footballer

Personal information
- Full name: Yair Emanuel Marín
- Date of birth: 31 January 1990 (age 36)
- Place of birth: Viale, Argentina
- Height: 1.86 m (6 ft 1 in)
- Position: Centre-back

Team information
- Current team: Unión San Felipe

Youth career
- Viale FBC
- Arsenal de Viale
- Newell's Old Boys
- Central Córdoba
- San Lorenzo

Senior career*
Years	Team	Apps	(Gls)
2011–2013	El Porvenir	42	(1)
2013–2014	Atlético Palmira	38	(1)
2015–2018	Gimnasia de Mendoza	78	(3)
2018–2019	Temperley	2	(0)
2019–2020	Independiente Rivadavia	21	(1)
2021–2023	Chaco For Ever	80	(5)
2024	San Martín Mendoza	16	(0)
2024–	Unión San Felipe	0	(0)
- * Club domestic league appearances and goals as of 5 July 2024

Yair Emanuel Marín (born 31 January 1990) is an Argentine professional footballer who plays as a centre-back for Chilean club Unión San Felipe.

== Career ==
Marín played for local clubs Viale FBC and Arsenal de Viale at youth level, before moving on to the academies of Newell's Old Boys, Central Córdoba and San Lorenzo. A move to Primera C Metropolitana then came with El Porvenir. He scored one goal in forty-two matches across two campaigns. Atlético Palmira of Torneo Argentino B signed Marín on 13 September 2013, one further goal across thirty-eight appearances followed. Marín joined Primera B Nacional side Gimnasia y Esgrima in 2015. Goals versus Estudiantes, Boca Unidos and Guillermo Brown occurred in 2015 as they suffered relegation to Torneo Federal A.

He remained with Gimnasia y Esgrima for three more seasons, which culminated with promotion back to tier two. Marín moved to Temperley in July 2018 but left after two games. On 20 January 2019, Primera B Nacional's Independiente Rivadavia became Marín's fifth senior club.

In the second half of 2024, Marín moved to Chile and signed with Unión San Felipe in the Primera B.

== Career statistics ==
As of 30 January 2019.

Club statistics
Club	Season	League			Cup		Continental		Other		Total	
Club	Season	Division	Apps	Goals	Apps	Goals	Apps	Goals	Apps	Goals	Apps	Goals
Gimnasia y Esgrima	2015	Primera B Nacional	31	2	0	0	—		1 (Note: Appearance(s) in the Primera B Nacional play-offs)	1	32	3
Gimnasia y Esgrima	2016	Torneo Federal A	4	0	0	0	—		0	0	4	0
Gimnasia y Esgrima	2016–17	Torneo Federal A	17	0	2	0	—		6 (Note: Appearance(s) in the Torneo Federal A play-offs)	2	25	2
Gimnasia y Esgrima	2017–18	Torneo Federal A	26	1	3	1	—		5	0	34	2
Gimnasia y Esgrima	Total		78	3	5	1	—		12	3	95	7
Temperley	2018–19	Primera B Nacional	2	0	2	0	—		0	0	4	0
Independiente Rivadavia	2018–19	Primera B Nacional	0	0	0	0	—		0	0	0	0
Career total			80	3	7	1	—		12	3	99	7
