= Lautaro Disanto =

Argentine professional footballer

Personal information
- Date of birth: 30 May 1998 (age 28)
- Place of birth: Mendoza, Argentina
- Position: Forward

Team information
- Current team: Defensores Unidos

Youth career
- Independiente Rivadavia

Senior career*
Years	Team	Apps	(Gls)
2017–2021	Independiente Rivadavia	55	(1)
2021	Villa Mitre	16	(2)
2022	Douglas Haig	10	(0)
2022	Desamparados	12	(0)
2023–	Defensores Unidos	32	(0)
2024	→ Libertad FC	12	(2)
2024–	→ Deportivo Morón (loan)	23	(1)
- * Club domestic league appearances and goals as of 17:27, 4 August 2025 (UTC)

Lautaro Disanto (born 30 May 1998) is an Argentine professional footballer who plays as a forward for Deportivo Morón, on loan from Defensores Unidos.

== Career ==
Disanto began his career in the ranks of Primera B Nacional's Independiente Rivadavia. His first appearance was his professional debut, he participated for the final twenty-six minutes of a 2–2 draw with Los Andes on 21 May 2017. Disanto scored his first goal a month later during a victory over Chacarita Juniors, in a season which ended with fourteen appearances in all competitions and a fourth-place finish in 2016–17; he signed a contract until 2020 in that campaign.

== Career statistics ==
As of 31 January 2019.

Club statistics
Club	Season	League			Cup		Continental		Other		Total	
Club	Season	Division	Apps	Goals	Apps	Goals	Apps	Goals	Apps	Goals	Apps	Goals
Independiente Rivadavia	2016–17	Primera B Nacional	13	1	1	0	—		0	0	14	1
Independiente Rivadavia	2017–18	Primera B Nacional	18	0	0	0	—		0	0	18	0
Independiente Rivadavia	2018–19	Primera B Nacional	9	0	0	0	—		0	0	9	0
Career total			40	1	1	0	—		0	0	41	1
