= Jorge Zules Caicedo =

Colombian footballer (born 1991)

Personal information
- Full name: Jorge Raúl Zules Caicedo
- Date of birth: 14 February 1991 (age 35)
- Place of birth: Mocoa, Colombia
- Height: 1.83 m (6 ft 0 in)
- Position: Centre-back

Team information
- Current team: Chaco For Ever

Senior career*
Years	Team	Apps	(Gls)
2012–2014	Douglas Haig	1	(0)
2014	Sport Club Salto	14	(1)
2015–2018	Defensores Belgrano VR	62	(1)
2018–2019	Independiente Rivadavia	13	(0)
2019–2020	Alvarado	14	(2)
2020–2021	Unión Santa Fe	0	(0)
2021	San Martín SJ	3	(0)
2022	Independiente Rivadavia	14	(0)
2023–2024	Deportivo Madryn	38	(1)
2024–2025	Coatepeque		
2025–	Chaco For Ever	7	(0)
- * Club domestic league appearances and goals as of 17:52, 24 April 2026 (UTC)

Jorge Raúl Zules Caicedo (born 14 February 1991) is a Colombian professional footballer who plays as a centre-back for Chaco For Ever.

== Career ==
Zules Caicedo arrived in Argentina from Colombia in 2012, signing with Douglas Haig of Primera B Nacional despite not being attached to a club back in his homeland. He remained for two years but made just one appearance. 2014 saw the defender move down to Torneo Federal B with Sport Club Salto. He netted one goal across four fixtures as they finished bottom in Zona 6. Having spent six months with them, Zules Caicedo left to join Torneo Federal A side Defensores de Belgrano. His first goal came in a 2–0 victory over Unión Sunchales on 2 August 2015, it was his sole goal in seventy-nine games for the Ramallo club.

In June 2018, Independiente Rivadavia of Primera B Nacional completed the signing of Zules Caicedo. He made his professional debut on 25 August against Los Andes, with his new team winning 0–1 at the Estadio Eduardo Gallardón. After seventeen total appearances as they reached the promotion play-offs, Zules Caicedo switched Independiente for newly promoted Primera B Nacional outfit Alvarado on 18 July 2019. Six months later, Zules Caicedo sealed a move to Primera División side Unión Santa Fe. He terminated his contract on 3 February 2021, having not featured competitively; he made the bench twelve times.

Immediately after leaving Unión, Zules Caicedo made a return to Primera B Nacional with San Martín. In December 2021, he signed with Independiente Rivadavia for the 2022 season.

== Career statistics ==
As of 4 February 2021.

Club statistics
Club	Season	League			Cup		League Cup		Continental		Other		Total	
Club	Season	Division	Apps	Goals	Apps	Goals	Apps	Goals	Apps	Goals	Apps	Goals	Apps	Goals
Sport Club Salto	2014	Torneo Federal B	14	1	0	0	—		—		0	0	14	1
Defensores de Belgrano	2015	Torneo Federal A	15	1	0	0	—		—		3 (Note: Appearance(s) in the Torneo Federal A play-offs)	0	18	1
Defensores de Belgrano	2016	Torneo Federal A	1	0	1	0	—		—		1	0	3	0
Defensores de Belgrano	2016–17	Torneo Federal A	22	0	3	0	—		—		7	0	32	0
Defensores de Belgrano	2017–18	Torneo Federal A	21	0	2	0	—		—		3	0	26	0
Defensores de Belgrano	Total		62	1	6	0	—		—		11	0	79	1
Independiente Rivadavia	2018–19	Primera B Nacional	13	0	0	0	—		—		4 (Note: Appearance(s) in the Primera B Nacional play-offs)	0	17	0
Alvarado	2019–20	Primera B Nacional	14	2	0	0	—		—		0	0	14	2
Unión Santa Fe	2019–20	Primera División	0	0	0	0	0	0	0	0	0	0	0	0
Unión Santa Fe	2020–21	Primera División	0	0	0	0	0	0	—		0	0	0	0
Unión Santa Fe	Total		0	0	0	0	0	0	0	0	11	0	79	1
San Martín	2021	Primera B Nacional	0	0	0	0	—		—		0	0	0	0
Career total			103	4	6	0	0	0	0	0	15	0	124	4
