= Mario Zaninovic =

Argentine footballer (born 1987)

Personal information
- Full name: Mario Matías Zaninovic
- Date of birth: 20 March 1987 (age 39)
- Place of birth: Sáenz Peña, Argentina
- Height: 1.78 m (5 ft 10 in)
- Position: Midfielder

Team information
- Current team: Deportivo Riestra

Senior career*
Years	Team	Apps	(Gls)
2009–2011	Lanús	5	(0)
2011–2015	Ferro Carril Oeste	86	(6)
2016–2017	Estudiantes BA	28	(2)
2017–	Deportivo Riestra	81	(0)
- * Club domestic league appearances and goals as of 21:46, 16 July 2022 (UTC)

Mario Matías Zaninovic (born 20 March 1987) is an Argentine professional footballer who plays as a midfielder for Deportivo Riestra.

== Career ==
Zaninovic started his career with Lanús. He made the breakthrough into the Primera División club's senior squad midway through 2008–09, making appearances against Gimnasia y Esgrima, Banfield and San Martín; all were away from home. Zaninovic remained for two further seasons, though only appeared twice more for them. On 30 June 2011, Zaninovic joined Ferro Carril Oeste of Primera B Nacional. He scored in his second match, netting in a win over Guillermo Brown on 20 August 2011. He scored a total of five goals in his first season across twenty-eight fixtures, which preceded another sixty-one occurring in four campaigns.

In June 2016, after eighteen months without a senior appearance due to Ferro demotion, Zaninovic signed for Primera B Metropolitana's Estudiantes. Two goals in thirty overall matches followed in 2016–17. Deportivo Riestra completed the signing of Zaninovic on 6 September 2017. His bow didn't come until March, in a Primera B Nacional draw against Flandria; they ended the season with relegation.

== Career statistics ==
As of 5 June 2019.

Appearances and goals by club, season and competition
Club	Season	League			Cup		League Cup		Continental		Other		Total	
Club	Season	Division	Apps	Goals	Apps	Goals	Apps	Goals	Apps	Goals	Apps	Goals	Apps	Goals
Lanús	2008–09	Primera División	3	0	0	0	—		—		0	0	3	0
Lanús	2009–10	Primera División	2	0	0	0	—		—		0	0	2	0
Lanús	2010–11	Primera División	0	0	0	0	—		—		0	0	0	0
Lanús	Total		5	0	0	0	—		—		0	0	5	0
Ferro Carril Oeste	2011–12	Primera B Nacional	27	5	1	0	—		—		0	0	28	5
Ferro Carril Oeste	2012–13	Primera B Nacional	12	0	0	0	—		—		0	0	12	0
Ferro Carril Oeste	2013–14	Primera B Nacional	29	1	1	0	—		—		0	0	30	1
Ferro Carril Oeste	2014	Primera B Nacional	18	0	1	0	—		—		0	0	19	0
Ferro Carril Oeste	2015	Primera B Nacional	0	0	0	0	—		—		0	0	0	0
Ferro Carril Oeste	Total		86	6	3	0	—		—		0	0	89	6
Estudiantes	2016–17	Primera B Metropolitana	28	2	2	0	—		—		0	0	30	2
Deportivo Riestra	2017–18	Primera B Nacional	7	0	0	0	—		—		0	0	7	0
Deportivo Riestra	2018–19	Primera B Metropolitana	34	0	1	0	—		—		0	0	35	0
Deportivo Riestra	Total		41	0	1	0	—		—		0	0	42	0
Career total			160	8	6	0	—		—		0	0	166	8
