= Marcos Fernández (footballer, born 1993) =

Argentine association football player

Personal information
- Full name: Marcos Gabriel Fernández
- Date of birth: April 20, 1993 (age 33)
- Place of birth: Matilde, Argentina
- Height: 1.83 m (6 ft 0 in)
- Position: Midfielder

Team information
- Current team: Atlético Rafaela

Youth career
- Colón

Senior career*
Years	Team	Apps	(Gls)
2011–2015	Colón	24	(0)
2015	→ San Luis (loan)	5	(0)
2016–2017	Sportivo Las Parejas	14	(1)
2017–2018	Unión Sunchales	23	(7)
2018–2019	Sarmiento Resistencia	22	(6)
2019–2020	San Martín SJ	14	(0)
2020–2021	Estudiantes RC	5	(0)
2021–2022	Rangers de Talca	10	(1)
2022–2023	Güemes	15	(0)
2023–2024	Flandria	12	(0)
2024	Estudiantes SL	10	(0)
2024–2025	Santamarina	13	(4)
2025–	Atlético Rafaela	3	(0)
- * Club domestic league appearances and goals as of 18:25, 27 March 2026 (UTC)

Marcos Gabriel Fernández (born April 20, 1993, in Matilde, Argentina) is an Argentine footballer currently playing for Atlético Rafaela.

== Career statistics ==
Club statistics
Club	Season	League		Cup		Total	
Club	Season	Apps	Goals	Apps	Goals	Apps	Goals
Colón	2011–12	1	0	1	0	2	0
Colón	2012–13	3	0	—		3	0
Colón	2013–14	13	0	—		13	0
Colón	2014	5	0	1	0	6	0
Colón	2015	2	0	1	0	3	0
Colón	Total	24	0	3	0	27	0
San Luis	2015	5	0	7	0	12	0
Sportivo Las Parejas	2016–17	14	1	3	0	17	1
Unión Sunchales	2017–18	23	7	4	0	27	7
Sarmiento Resistencia	2018–19	22	6	4	0	26	6
Career total		88	14	21	0	109	14
