= Juan Francisco Rago =

Argentine footballer (born 1988)

Personal information
- Full name: Juan Francisco Rago
- Date of birth: 31 October 1988 (age 38)
- Place of birth: Mar del Plata, Argentina
- Height: 1.85 m (6 ft 1 in)
- Position: Goalkeeper

Team information
- Current team: Club Atlético Atlanta

Youth career
- Argentinos del Sud
- Godoy Cruz

Senior career*
Years	Team	Apps	(Gls)
2008–2010	Sportivo Barracas	41	(0)
2010	Atlético Policial	9	(0)
2011	General Güemes		
2012–2013	Mitre	27	(0)
2013–2014	Central Córdoba	19	(0)
2014–2015	Güemes	14	(0)
2015	Libertad de Concordia	20	(0)
2016–2017	Ferro Carril Oeste	42	(0)
2017–2018	Alvarado	22	(0)
2018–	Atlanta	104	(0)
- * Club domestic league appearances and goals as of 19:29, 14 June 2022 (UTC)

Juan Francisco Rago (born 31 October 1988) is an Argentine professional footballer who plays as a goalkeeper for Atlanta.

== Career ==
Rago had youth spells with Argentinos del Sud and Godoy Cruz. Sportivo Barracas gave Rago his start in senior football, selecting him forty-one times in Primera C Metropolitana for two years from 2008. In 2010, Rago moved across to the other fourth tier, Torneo Argentino B, to join Atlético Policial. Nine appearances followed. A subsequent spell in Torneo Argentino C with General Güemes came, prior to a return to tier four with Mitre. In 2013, Rago joined fellow Santiago del Estero outfit Central Córdoba. He made his debut versus San Jorge in October, which was the first of twenty-two matches for the club throughout 2013–14.

Rago was signed by Torneo Federal B's Güemes in 2014, which preceded him playing in the same division for Libertad de Concordia to end 2015. Torneo Federal A's Ferro Carril Oeste became Rago's eighth senior team on 1 January 2016. Fifteen appearances arrived in season one, which culminated with him receiving a red card in a defeat to Unión Aconquija in May 2016's promotion play-offs. After two campaigns with the club, Rago departed to spend 2017–18 with Alvarado. In June 2018, Rago completed a move to Atlanta of Primera B Metropolitana. His bow for them in August ended in a 4–0 win over Tristán Suárez.

== Personal life ==
Rago's father, Francisco, was a footballer - he also played for Alvarado.

== Career statistics ==
As of 26 April 2019.

Appearances and goals by club, season and competition
Club	Season	League			Cup		League Cup		Continental		Other		Total	
Club	Season	Division	Apps	Goals	Apps	Goals	Apps	Goals	Apps	Goals	Apps	Goals	Apps	Goals
Atlético Policial	2010–11	Torneo Argentino B	9	0	0	0	—		—		0	0	9	0
Mitre	2011–12	Torneo Argentino B	27	0	0	0	—		—		0	0	27	0
Central Córdoba	2013–14	Torneo Argentino A	19	0	1	0	—		—		2 (Note: Appearance(s) in the Torneo Argentino A play-offs)	0	22	0
Libertad de Concordia	2015	Torneo Federal B	20	0	0	0	—		—		0	0	20	0
Ferro Carril Oeste	2016	Torneo Federal A	12	0	0	0	—		—		3 (Note: Appearance(s) in the Torneo Federal A play-offs)	0	15	0
Ferro Carril Oeste	2016–17	Torneo Federal A	30	0	0	0	—		—		0	0	30	0
Ferro Carril Oeste	Total		42	0	0	0	—		—		3	0	45	0
Alvarado	2017–18	Torneo Federal A	22	0	2	0	—		—		6	0	30	0
Atlanta	2018–19	Primera B Metropolitana	34	0	0	0	—		—		0	0	34	0
Career total			173	0	3	0	—		—		11	0	187	0
