= Federico Guerra (footballer, born 1990) =

Argentine footballer

Personal information
- Date of birth: 15 July 1990 (age 36)
- Place of birth: Mendoza, Argentina
- Height: 1.76 m (5 ft 9 1/2 in)
- Position: Midfielder

Youth career
- Independiente Rivadavia

Senior career*
Years	Team	Apps	(Gls)
2011–2014	Independiente Rivadavia	85	(2)
2015	Sportivo Italiano	31	(4)
2016–2017	Atlanta	35	(0)
2017–2019	Independiente Rivadavia	14	(0)
2019–2021	Tristán Suárez	28	(0)
2021	Juventud UU	16	(1)
2022–2023	Ciudad de Bolívar	20	(0)
2024	San Martín de Mendoza	20	(0)
- * Club domestic league appearances and goals as of 12:25, 9 January 2026 (UTC)

Federico Guerra (born 15 July 1990) is an Argentine professional footballer who plays as a midfielder. He is currently without a team.

== Career ==
Independiente Rivadavia were Guerra's first club. After being an unused substitute for a Primera B Nacional fixture with Instituto on 18 June 2011, he made his senior bow in the Copa Argentina against Aldosivi on 22 November. A first professional league appearance arrived at the end of the month versus Instituto, which ended up being the first of eighty-five appearances in the league for them up until December 2014; goals also occurred in matches with Douglas Haig and Crucero del Norte. On 31 March 2015, Guerra dropped down to Primera B Metropolitana to play for Sportivo Italiano. He scored four times in thirty-one games.

Having suffered relegation with Sportivo Italiano, Guerra left to join Atlanta in January 2016. His spell with them lasted two seasons in the third tier, he participated in thirty-seven matches as the club secured back-to-back top three finishes. September 2017 saw Guerra complete a move back to Independiente Rivadavia. His first appearance came in Primera B Nacional versus Guillermo Brown on 10 November.

After passing through Ciudad Bolívar in 2022–2023 and San Martín de Mendoza in 2024, He is currently without a team.

== Career statistics ==
As of 1 February 2019.

Club statistics
Club	Season	League			Cup		Continental		Other		Total	
Club	Season	Division	Apps	Goals	Apps	Goals	Apps	Goals	Apps	Goals	Apps	Goals
Independiente Rivadavia	2010–11	Primera B Nacional	0	0	0	0	—		0	0	0	0
Independiente Rivadavia	2011–12	Primera B Nacional	20	0	1	0	—		0	0	21	0
Independiente Rivadavia	2012–13	Primera B Nacional	22	0	0	0	—		0	0	22	0
Independiente Rivadavia	2013–14	Primera B Nacional	26	1	0	0	—		0	0	26	1
Independiente Rivadavia	2014	Primera B Nacional	17	1	0	0	—		0	0	17	1
Independiente Rivadavia	Total		85	2	1	0	—		0	0	86	2
Sportivo Italiano	2015	Primera B Metropolitana	31	4	0	0	—		0	0	31	4
Atlanta	2016	Primera B Metropolitana	14	0	0	0	—		0	0	14	0
Atlanta	2016–17	Primera B Metropolitana	21	0	1	0	—		1 (Note: Appearance(s) in the Primera B Metropolitana play-offs)	0	23	0
Atlanta	Total		35	0	1	0	—		1	0	37	0
Independiente Rivadavia	2017–18	Primera B Nacional	6	0	0	0	—		0	0	6	0
Independiente Rivadavia	2018–19	Primera B Nacional	5	0	0	0	—		0	0	5	0
Independiente Rivadavia	Total		11	0	0	0	—		0	0	11	0
Career total			162	6	2	0	—		1	0	165	6
