= Luciano Sánchez (footballer, born January 1994) =

Argentine footballer (born 1994)

Personal information
- Full name: Luciano Federico Sánchez
- Date of birth: 25 January 1994 (age 32)
- Place of birth: Guaymallen, Argentina
- Height: 1.69 m (5 ft 7 in)
- Position: Right-back

Team information
- Current team: Argentinos Juniors
- Number: 3

Youth career
- Independiente Rivadavia

Senior career*
Years	Team	Apps	(Gls)
2015–2021	Independiente Rivadavia	115	(3)
2022–	Argentinos Juniors	42	(1)
- * Club domestic league appearances and goals as of 14:43, 7 May 2024 (UTC)

Luciano Federico Sánchez (born 25 January 1994) is an Argentine professional footballer who plays as a right-back for Argentine Primera División club Argentinos Juniors.

== Career ==
Sánchez began his career with Independiente Rivadavia. He made his professional debut on 6 June 2015 against Juventud Unida, which was one of twelve appearances in 2015 in Primera B Nacional. Just one appearance followed in 2016, though Sánchez did play twelve times in 2016–17 as he also scored his opening career goal, netting in a 0–2 away victory versus Villa Dálmine in July 2017.

On 1 August 2023, Sánchez suffered a full dislocation of his left knee in a Copa Libertadores match against Fluminense after an unintentional foul by Marcelo. Following a VAR review, Marcelo was shown a red card; he later apologized and gave his condolences to Sánchez about the incident on his official Instagram account.

== Career statistics ==
As of 21 January 2019.

Appearances and goals by club, season and competition
Club	Season	League			Cup		Continental		Other		Total	
Club	Season	Division	Apps	Goals	Apps	Goals	Apps	Goals	Apps	Goals	Apps	Goals
Independiente Rivadavia	2015	Primera B Nacional	12	0	0	0	—		0	0	12	0
Independiente Rivadavia	2016	Primera B Nacional	1	0	0	0	—		0	0	1	0
Independiente Rivadavia	2016–17	Primera B Nacional	12	1	1	0	—		0	0	13	1
Independiente Rivadavia	2017–18	Primera B Nacional	20	0	0	0	—		0	0	20	0
Independiente Rivadavia	2018–19	Primera B Nacional	11	0	0	0	—		0	0	11	0
Career total			56	1	1	0	—		0	0	57	1
