= Nicolás Quiroga =

Argentine footballer

Personal information
- Full name: Nicolás Gabriel Quiroga
- Date of birth: 20 May 1995 (age 31)
- Place of birth: Las Heras, Argentina
- Height: 1.77 m (5 ft 9 1/2 in)
- Position: Midfielder

Team information
- Current team: Sportivo Desamparados

Youth career
- Amigos del Barrio Perlé
- 2000–2015: Independiente Rivadavia

Senior career*
| Years | Team | Apps | (Gls) |
| 2015–2020 | Independiente Rivadavia | 24 | (0) |
| 2020 | Sarmiento | 3 | (0) |
| 2021 | FADEP | 3 | (0) |
| 2022– | Sportivo Desamparados | 0 | (0) |
- * Club domestic league appearances and goals as of 21:44, 11 March 2022 (UTC)

Nicolás Gabriel Quiroga (born 20 May 1995) is an Argentine professional footballer who plays as a midfielder for Sportivo Desamparados.

== Career ==
Quiroga played for Amigos del Barrio Perlé at a young age, prior to moving to Independiente Rivadavia in 2000. After fifteen years in their youth system, he was subsequently moved to the senior squad in 2015 and selected as an unused substitute twice for matches with Boca Unidos and Douglas Haig. Quiroga's professional debut came on 14 April 2017 in a draw with Almagro. After four league appearances in four seasons as a substitute, his first start arrived against Los Andes in the club's 2018–19 opener.

== Career statistics ==
As of 1 February 2019.

Club statistics
| Club | Season | League | | | Cup | | Continental | | Other | | Total | |
| Club | Season | Division | Apps | Goals | Apps | Goals | Apps | Goals | Apps | Goals | Apps | Goals |
|---|---|---|---|---|---|---|---|---|---|---|---|---|
| Independiente Rivadavia | 2015 | Primera B Nacional | 0 | 0 | 0 | 0 | — | | 0 | 0 | 0 | 0 |
| Independiente Rivadavia | 2016 | Primera B Nacional | 0 | 0 | 0 | 0 | — | | 0 | 0 | 0 | 0 |
| Independiente Rivadavia | 2016–17 | Primera B Nacional | 2 | 0 | 1 | 0 | — | | 0 | 0 | 3 | 0 |
| Independiente Rivadavia | 2017–18 | Primera B Nacional | 2 | 0 | 0 | 0 | — | | 0 | 0 | 2 | 0 |
| Independiente Rivadavia | 2018–19 | Primera B Nacional | 5 | 0 | 0 | 0 | — | | 0 | 0 | 5 | 0 |
| Career total | | | 9 | 0 | 1 | 0 | — | | 0 | 0 | 10 | 0 |
