= Cristian Lucero (footballer, born 1987) =

Argentine footballer

Personal information
- Full name: Cristian Alfredo Lucero
- Date of birth: 1 October 1987 (age 39)
- Place of birth: Mendoza, Argentina
- Height: 1.70 m (5 ft 7 in)
- Position: Forward

Team information
- Current team: Almopos Aridea

Youth career
- Independiente Rivadavia

Senior career*
Years	Team	Apps	(Gls)
- Deportivo Algarroba
2004–2005	Estudiantes	13	(1)
2005–2007	Independiente Rivadavia	23	(2)
2007–2008	Juventud Unida Universitario	18	(1)
2008	Deportivo Guaymallén	11	(2)
2009	Sportivo Patria	3	(0)
2012–2013	Andes Talleres	21	(4)
2013–2014	Deportivo Montecaseros	13	(2)
2014–2016	Gutiérrez	53	(20)
2016	Huracán Las Heras	21	(12)
2017–2019	Independiente Rivadavia	34	(5)
2019–2020	Huracán Las Heras	19	(3)
2020–	Almopos Aridea		
- * Club domestic league appearances and goals as of 23:57, 27 September 2019 (UTC)

Cristian Alfredo Lucero (born 1 October 1987) is an Argentine professional footballer who plays as a forward for Almopos Aridea.

== Career ==
Lucero played for Independiente Rivadavia's academy after joining at the age of seven. He began his senior league career with Torneo Argentino B side Estudiantes in 2004. Having scored once in thirteen games for the San Luis club, he moved up a step to resign with Independiente Rivadavia. His second season ended with promotion to Primera B Nacional. However, Lucero didn't feature in the second tier as he left to Juventud Unida Universitario, therefore remaining in Torneo Argentino A. Moves to Deportivo Guaymallén and Sportivo Patria followed. By this point, he had also featured for Deportivo Algarroba.

Lucero played for Andes Talleres in the third division in 2012–13, scoring four goals as they experienced relegation. He subsequently spent time with Deportivo Montecaseros and Gutiérrez up until 2016. With Gutiérrez, they were promoted up to Torneo Federal A as he notched twenty goals across fifty-four appearances for the club. Lucero had a short spell with Huracán Las Heras in Torneo Federal B to end 2016, scoring twelve times in twenty-one. On 3 November 2017, Lucero rejoined Independiente Rivadavia; now of Primera B Nacional. His first pro league appearance came in a Flandria draw on 5 November.

In September 2020, Lucero joined Cypriot Second Division club Enosis Neon THOI Lakatamia.

== Personal life ==
Lucero's brother, Adrián, is also a professional footballer.

== Career statistics ==
As of 5 February 2019.

Club statistics
Club	Season	League			Cup		Continental		Other		Total	
Club	Season	Division	Apps	Goals	Apps	Goals	Apps	Goals	Apps	Goals	Apps	Goals
Estudiantes	2004–05	Torneo Argentino B	13	1	0	0	—		0	0	13	1
Juventud Unida Universitario	2007–08	Torneo Argentino A	18	1	0	0	—		0	0	18	1
Deportivo Guaymallén	2008–09	Torneo Argentino B	11	2	0	0	—		0	0	11	2
Sportivo Patria	2008–09	Torneo Argentino B	3	0	0	0	—		0	0	3	0
Andes Talleres	2012–13	Torneo Argentino B	21	4	0	0	—		0	0	21	4
Deportivo Montecaseros	2013–14	Torneo Argentino B	13	2	0	0	—		0	0	13	2
Gutiérrez	2014	Torneo Federal B	18	8	0	0	—		0	0	18	8
Gutiérrez	2015	Torneo Federal A	27	9	0	0	—		1 (Note: Appearance(s) in the Torneo Federal A play-offs)	0	28	9
Gutiérrez	2016	Torneo Federal A	8	3	0	0	—		0	0	8	3
Gutiérrez	Total		53	20	0	0	—		1	0	54	20
Huracán Las Heras	2016 (C)	Torneo Federal B	21	12	0	0	—		0	0	21	12
Independiente Rivadavia	2017–18	Primera B Nacional	14	2	0	0	—		0	0	14	2
Independiente Rivadavia	2018–19	Primera B Nacional	12	3	0	0	—		0	0	12	3
Independiente Rivadavia	Total		26	5	0	0	—		0	0	26	5
Career total			179	47	0	0	—		1	0	180	47
