= Julián Navas =

Argentine footballer

Personal information
- Full name: Julián Alejandro Navas
- Date of birth: 30 November 1993 (age 32)
- Place of birth: Mendoza, Argentina
- Height: 1.80 m (5 ft 11 in)
- Position: Right-back

Team information
- Current team: Los Andes

Senior career*
Years	Team	Apps	(Gls)
2013–2020	Independiente Rivadavia	66	(4)
2013–2014	→ Wiener Sport-Club (loan)		
2014–2015	→ Jorge Newbery (VM) (loan)	35	(7)
2020–2023	Arsenal de Sarandí	48	(3)
2023–2024	Central Córdoba SdE	8	(0)
2024–2025	Colón	4	(0)
2025–2026	Patronato	21	(0)
2026–	Los Andes	8	(1)
- * Club domestic league appearances and goals as of 17:18, 29 April 2026 (UTC)

Julián Alejandro Navas (born 30 November 1993) is an Argentine professional footballer who plays as a right-back for Los Andes.

== Career ==
Navas started his career with Independiente Rivadavia. Navas completed a loan move in 2013 to Wiener Sport-Club of the Austrian Regionalliga. A year later, he returned to his parent club before being loaned back out to Torneo Federal B side Jorge Newbery (VM). He scored seven goals in thirty-five appearances over the 2014 and 2015 seasons. Navas' professional league debut arrived on 22 April 2016 for Independiente Rivadavia against Estudiantes, with a further appearance coming later that month versus Boca Unidos. A win over Santamarina in April 2018 saw Navas score his first goal for them.

In August 2020, Navas joined Primera División outfit Arsenal de Sarandí. His bow for the club occurred on 12 December in a 1–1 draw at La Bombonera against Boca Juniors.

== Career statistics ==
As of 13 December 2020.

Club statistics
Club	Season	League			Cup		League Cup		Continental		Other		Total	
Club	Season	Division	Apps	Goals	Apps	Goals	Apps	Goals	Apps	Goals	Apps	Goals	Apps	Goals
Independiente Rivadavia	2016	Primera B Nacional	2	0	0	0	—		—		0	0	2	0
Independiente Rivadavia	2016–17	Primera B Nacional	14	0	0	0	—		—		0	0	14	0
Independiente Rivadavia	2017–18	Primera B Nacional	16	1	0	0	—		—		0	0	16	1
Independiente Rivadavia	2018–19	Primera B Nacional	21	1	1	0	—		—		0	0	22	1
Independiente Rivadavia	2019–20	Primera B Nacional	13	2	0	0	—		—		0	0	13	2
Independiente Rivadavia	Total		66	4	1	0	—		—		0	0	67	4
Arsenal de Sarandí	2020–21 (Note: Soccerway counts Copa de la Liga Profesional appearances as league appearances.)	Primera División	1	0	0	0	0	0	—		0	0	1	0
Career total			67	4	1	0	0	0	—		0	0	68	4
