= Damián Cataldo =

Argentine footballer

Personal information
- Full name: Damián Emanuel Cataldo
- Date of birth: 1 August 1998 (age 28)
- Place of birth: Argentina
- Position: Midfielder

Team information
- Current team: Deportes Vallenar

Senior career*
| Years | Team | Apps | (Gls) |
| 2018–2019 | Independiente Rivadavia | 1 | (0) |
| 2019 | Gutiérrez | | |
| 2020– | Deportes Vallenar | 0 | (0) |
- * Club domestic league appearances and goals as of 12:46, 8 July 2020 (UTC)

Damián Emanuel Cataldo (born 1 August 1998) is an Argentine professional footballer who plays as a midfielder for Deportes Vallenar.

== Career ==
Cataldo made his senior breakthrough with Independiente Rivadavia, moving into the club's squad during the 2018–19 Primera B Nacional season. He was an unused substitute for a 0–1 win away to Los Andes on 25 August 2018, prior to making his bow in professional football in September against Platense. He departed the club in mid-2019, subsequently having a six-month stint in Liga Mendocina with Gutiérrez. In 2020, Cataldo joined Chilean Segunda División side Deportes Vallenar.

== Career statistics ==
As of 8 July 2020.

Club statistics
| Club | Season | League | | | Cup | | League Cup | | Continental | | Other | | Total | |
| Club | Season | Division | Apps | Goals | Apps | Goals | Apps | Goals | Apps | Goals | Apps | Goals | Apps | Goals |
|---|---|---|---|---|---|---|---|---|---|---|---|---|---|---|
| Independiente Rivadavia | 2018–19 | Primera B Nacional | 1 | 0 | 0 | 0 | — | | — | | 0 | 0 | 1 | 0 |
| Deportes Vallenar | 2020 | Segunda División | 0 | 0 | 0 | 0 | — | | — | | 0 | 0 | 0 | 0 |
| Career total | | | 1 | 0 | 0 | 0 | — | | — | | 0 | 0 | 1 | 0 |
