= Franco Ledesma =

Argentine footballer

Personal information
- Full name: Franco Emanuel Ledesma
- Date of birth: 3 October 1992 (age 34)
- Place of birth: San Miguel de Tucumán, Argentina
- Height: 1.86 m (6 ft 1 in)
- Position: Centre-back

Team information
- Current team: Deportes Iquique

Senior career*
Years	Team	Apps	(Gls)
2011	San Jorge Tucumán		
2012–2013	Atlético Concepción	9	(0)
2013	Argentinos 25 de Mayo	6	(0)
2013–2014	Instituto Deportivo Santiago	15	(0)
2014	→ Sportivo Guzmán (loan)		
2014	→ Central Córdoba SdE (loan)	2	(0)
2015	Mitre	14	(1)
2016	Sportivo Patria	5	(0)
2016–2019	Mitre	26	(0)
2019–2020	Independiente Rivadavia	16	(0)
2020–2022	Alvarado	51	(0)
2023	Deportes Iquique	27	(0)
2024	Agropecuario	18	(0)
2025	San Marcos	25	(1)
2026–	Deportes Iquique	0	(0)
- * Club domestic league appearances and goals as of 22 December 2025

Franco Emanuel Ledesma (born 3 October 1992) is an Argentine professional footballer who plays as a centre-back for Chilean club Deportes Iquique.

== Career ==
Ledesma started in Torneo Argentino C with San Jorge. In 2012, Ledesma joined Atlético Concepción of Torneo Argentino B, featuring nine times in two years. Moves to Argentinos and Instituto Deportivo Santiago followed, along with twenty-one appearances in 2013 and 2014. Instituto loaned Ledesma to Sportivo Guzmán in 2014. He returned midway through, subsequently joining Torneo Federal A's Central Córdoba on loan. Appearance two ended drawn with San Martín, though San Martín were later awarded the win due to him being ineligible as his Sportivo Guzmán loan hadn't officially ended.

He departed Instituto permanently in January 2015 to join Mitre, with Ledesma scoring his first goal versus Vélez Sarsfield in the following March. Ledesma spent seven months with Sportivo Patria from January 2016, prior to rejoining Mitre in July. Twenty appearances followed in his first campaign back in 2016–17, a season that ended with promotion to Primera B Nacional. He subsequently made his professional football debut, playing the full duration of a 2–0 defeat to Agropecuario on 18 November 2017. After a 2019–20 stint with Independiente Rivadavia, Ledesma joined Alvarado in July 2020.

In 2023, he moved to Chile and played for Deportes Iquique. In 2024, he returned to Argentina and joined Agropuecuario.

After playing for San Marcos de Arica during 2025, Ledesma returned to Deportes Iquique for the 2026 season.

== Career statistics ==
As of 29 August 2020.

Club statistics
Club	Season	League			Cup		League Cup		Continental		Other		Total	
Club	Season	Division	Apps	Goals	Apps	Goals	Apps	Goals	Apps	Goals	Apps	Goals	Apps	Goals
Atlético Concepción	2012–13	Torneo Argentino B	9	0	0	0	—		—		0	0	9	0
Instituto Deportivo Santiago	2013–14	Torneo Argentino B	15	0	0	0	—		—		0	0	15	0
Instituto Deportivo Santiago	2014	Torneo Federal B	0	0	0	0	—		—		0	0	0	0
Instituto Deportivo Santiago	Total		15	0	0	0	—		—		0	0	15	0
Central Córdoba (loan)	2014	Torneo Federal A	2	0	0	0	—		—		0	0	2	0
Mitre	2015	Torneo Federal A	14	1	0	0	—		—		2 (Note: Appearance(s) in Torneo Federal A play-offs)	0	16	1
Sportivo Patria	2016	Torneo Federal A	5	0	0	0	—		—		0	0	5	0
Mitre	2016–17	Torneo Federal A	15	0	1	0	—		—		4	0	20	0
Mitre	2017–18	Primera B Nacional	4	0	2	0	—		—		0	0	6	0
Mitre	2018–19	Primera B Nacional	3	0	0	0	—		—		0	0	3	0
Mitre	Total		22	0	3	0	—		—		4	0	29	0
Independiente Rivadavia	2019–20	Primera B Nacional	16	0	1	0	—		—		0	0	17	0
Alvarado	2020–21	Primera B Nacional	0	0	0	0	—		—		0	0	0	0
Career total			83	1	4	0	—		—		6	0	93	1
