= Cristian Lucero (footballer, born 1988) =

Argentine footballer (born 1988)

Personal information
- Full name: Cristian Iván Lucero
- Date of birth: 13 February 1988 (age 38)
- Place of birth: Argentina
- Position: Forward

Senior career*
Years	Team	Apps	(Gls)
- CSyD San Carlos
2013–2014	Deportivo Muñiz	7	(0)
2014	Platense	3	(0)
- * Club domestic league appearances and goals

Cristian Iván Lucero (born 13 February 1988) is an Argentine footballer who plays as a forward.

== Career ==
Lucero previously played for CSyD San Carlos in Liga Mercedina. He appeared for Deportivo Muñiz in the 2013–14 Primera D Metropolitana campaign, participating in seven matches as they finished twelfth. Primera B Metropolitana side Platense subsequently signed Lucero. Three professional league appearances followed in 2014.

== Career statistics ==
As of 5 February 2019.

Club statistics
Club	Season	League			Cup		Continental		Other		Total	
Club	Season	Division	Apps	Goals	Apps	Goals	Apps	Goals	Apps	Goals	Apps	Goals
Deportivo Muñiz	2013–14	Primera D Metropolitana	7	0	1	0	—		0	0	8	0
Platense	2014	Primera B Metropolitana	3	0	0	0	—		0	0	3	0
Career total			10	0	1	0	—		0	0	11	0
