= Maximiliano Meza (footballer, born 1997) =

Argentine footballer

Personal information
- Full name: Maximiliano Nicolás Meza
- Date of birth: 13 June 1997 (age 29)
- Place of birth: San Luis, Argentina
- Height: 1.80 m (5 ft 11 in)
- Position: Midfielder

Senior career*
Years	Team	Apps	(Gls)
2014–2015	Ex Alumnos Escuela N°185	5	(0)
2018–2019	Independiente Rivadavia	1	(0)
2020	Gutiérrez SC	7	(1)
2020	Estudiantes	4	(1)
2021	Círculo Deportivo	5	(0)
- * Club domestic league appearances and goals as of 21:41, 10 March 2022 (UTC)

Maximiliano Nicolás Meza (born 13 June 1997) is an Argentine professional footballer who plays as a midfielder.

== Career ==
Meza's senior career got underway in Torneo Federal B with Ex Alumnos Escuela N°185 between 2014 and 2015, with the midfielder appearing five times in the fourth tier of Argentine football. Meza soon made a move to Primera B Nacional's Independiente Rivadavia. He made his professional bow on 25 August 2018 during an away victory against Los Andes, coming off the bench in place of Franco Negri. He remained until the end of 2019, when he would join Torneo Regional Federal Amateur side Gutiérrez SC. He made two appearances before the COVID-19 pandemic halted the division.

In November 2020, Meza headed up to Torneo Federal A with Estudiantes. He scored his first senior league goal on 19 December against Círculo Deportivo.

== Career statistics ==
As of 20 February 2021.

Club statistics
Club	Season	League			Cup		League Cup		Continental		Other		Total	
Club	Season	Division	Apps	Goals	Apps	Goals	Apps	Goals	Apps	Goals	Apps	Goals	Apps	Goals
Independiente Rivadavia	2018–19	Primera B Nacional	1	0	0	0	—		—		0	0	1	0
Independiente Rivadavia	2019–20	Primera B Nacional	0	0	0	0	—		—		0	0	0	0
Independiente Rivadavia	Total		1	0	0	0	—		—		0	0	1	0
Gutiérrez SC	2020	Federal Amateur	2	0	0	0	—		—		0	0	2	0
Estudiantes	2020	Torneo Federal A	4	1	0	0	—		—		0	0	4	1
Career total			7	1	0	0	—		—		0	0	7	1
