= Santiago Úbeda =

Argentine footballer

Personal information
- Date of birth: 4 July 1996 (age 30)
- Place of birth: Mendoza, Argentina
- Position: Midfielder

Team information
- Current team: Almagro

Youth career
- Don Villa
- Sport Club Quiroga

Senior career*
Years	Team	Apps	(Gls)
2011–2013	Sport Club Quiroga		
2013–2020	Independiente Rivadavia	56	(0)
2020–2022	Sol de America	13	(1)
2022–2024	Deportivo Morón	55	(0)
2024	Aldosivi	9	(0)
2024–2025	Kalamata	0	(0)
2025–2026	Chaco For Ever	27	(1)
2026–	Almagro	5	(0)
- * Club domestic league appearances and goals as of 16:58, 22 April 2026 (UTC)

Santiago Úbeda (born 4 July 1996) is an Argentine professional footballer who plays as a midfielder for Almagro.

== Career ==
Don Villa and Sport Club Quiroga were Úbeda's first teams, he featured for both in youth football before making his senior bow for the latter at the age of fifteen. He left to join Independiente Rivadavia in 2013, initially playing for their academy prior to stepping up to senior level during the 2017–18 Primera B Nacional; initially appearing on the substitutes bench for fixtures with Deportivo Morón, Atlético de Rafaela and Boca Unidos. He would eventually make eight appearances that season, which included his professional debut on 11 March 2018 against Quilmes.

== Career statistics ==
As of 2 February 2019.

Club statistics
Club	Season	League			Cup		Continental		Other		Total	
Club	Season	Division	Apps	Goals	Apps	Goals	Apps	Goals	Apps	Goals	Apps	Goals
Independiente Rivadavia	2017–18	Primera B Nacional	8	0	0	0	—		0	0	8	0
Independiente Rivadavia	2018–19	Primera B Nacional	13	0	0	0	—		0	0	13	0
Career total			21	0	0	0	—		0	0	21	0
