= Pablo Palacio (footballer) =

Argentine footballer

Personal information
- Full name: Pablo Agustín Palacio
- Date of birth: 18 May 2000 (age 26)
- Place of birth: Godoy Cruz, Mendoza, Argentina
- Height: 1.80 m (5 ft 11 in)
- Position: Midfielder

Team information
- Current team: Deportes Iquique (on loan from Unión Santa Fe)

Youth career
- Centros de Actividades Infantiles
- Independiente Rivadavia

Senior career*
Years	Team	Apps	(Gls)
2019–2021	Independiente Rivadavia	36	(2)
2020	→ Unión Santa Fe (loan)	0	(0)
2021–	Unión Santa Fe	0	(0)
2021–2022	→ Independiente Rivadavia (loan)	58	(4)
2023	→ Ferro Carril Oeste (loan)	35	(5)
2024	→ Palestino (loan)	21	(0)
2025	→ Ferro Carril Oeste (loan)	28	(0)
2026	→ Almagro (loan)	17	(0)
2026–	→ Deportes Iquique (loan)	0	(0)
- * Club domestic league appearances and goals as of 6 August 2026

Pablo Agustín Palacio (born 18 May 2000) is an Argentine professional footballer who plays as a midfielder for Deportes Iquique, on loan from Unión Santa Fe.

== Career ==
Palacio's career began with local club Centros de Actividades Infantiles, which preceded a move to Independiente Rivadavia. He made his professional bow on 9 February 2019 versus Chacarita Juniors, with the midfielder appearing for sixty-four minutes of a Primera B Nacional away win.

On 21 August 2020, Palacio moved to Unión de Santa Fe on loan for 18-months for a fee around 950 thousand pesos, with a purchase option of 150 thousand dollars for 50% of his pass. However, he wasn't able to convince the club and didn't manage to play a single game for Unión, why he returned to Independiente Rivadavia ahead of the 2021 season. After a few games in the 2021 season for Rivadavia, Unión decided to bet on him anyway, why they bought the player free from Rivadavia for a fee of around 4 million pesos on 28 April 2021. However, he would continue to play for Rivadavia on loan for the 2021 season. At the end of the year, the loan deal was extended for one further year.

In 2024, he was loaned out to Chilean club Palestino on a one-year deal with an option to buy. Palacio returned to Chile with Deportes Iquique in August 2026.

== Career statistics ==
As of 10 February 2019.

Club statistics
Club	Season	League			Cup		Continental		Other		Total	
Club	Season	Division	Apps	Goals	Apps	Goals	Apps	Goals	Apps	Goals	Apps	Goals
Independiente Rivadavia	2018–19	Primera B Nacional	1	0	0	0	—		0	0	1	0
Career total			1	0	0	0	—		0	0	1	0
