= Isaías Lucero =

Mexican singer

Isaías Lucero (born November 13, 1969) is a Regional Mexican singer. He was previously the lead vocalist of norteño band Los Invasores de Nuevo León, but left for a solo career with EMI Records in 1999.
