= Emanuel Lucero =

Argentine professional footballer

Personal information
- Full name: Juan Emanuel Lucero
- Date of birth: 8 June 1995 (age 31)
- Place of birth: Rafael Castillo, Argentina
- Height: 1.69 m (5 ft 7 in)
- Position: Midfielder

Youth career
- Vélez Sarsfield

Senior career*
Years	Team	Apps	(Gls)
2016–2018	Vélez Sarsfield	0	(0)
2018–2019	Almirante Brown	10	(0)
- * Club domestic league appearances and goals as of 05:55, 23 April 2019 (UTC)

Juan Emanuel Lucero (born 8 June 1995) is an Argentine professional footballer who plays as a midfielder.

== Career ==
Lucero's career started off with Vélez Sarsfield. He didn't make an appearance at senior level for the club, though was once an unused substitute for a Primera División fixture in April 2016 versus Independiente. On 12 July 2018, Lucero joined Primera B Metropolitana side Almirante Brown. His first appearance arrived in the succeeding February, as he participated in the full duration of a goalless draw at home to San Telmo.

== Career statistics ==
As of 23 April 2019.

Appearances and goals by club, season and competition
Club	Season	League			Cup		League Cup		Continental		Other		Total	
Club	Season	Division	Apps	Goals	Apps	Goals	Apps	Goals	Apps	Goals	Apps	Goals	Apps	Goals
Vélez Sarsfield	2016	Primera División	0	0	0	0	—		—		0	0	0	0
Vélez Sarsfield	2016–17	Primera División	0	0	0	0	—		—		0	0	0	0
Vélez Sarsfield	2017–18	Primera División	0	0	0	0	—		—		0	0	0	0
Vélez Sarsfield	Total		0	0	0	0	—		—		0	0	0	0
Almirante Brown	2018–19	Primera B Metropolitana	8	0	0	0	—		—		0	0	8	0
Career total			8	0	0	0	—		—		0	0	8	0
