= Julián Marcioni =

Argentine footballer

Personal information
- Date of birth: 19 March 1998 (age 28)
- Place of birth: Cruz Alta, Argentina
- Height: 1.76 m (5 ft 9 in)
- Position: Right winger

Team information
- Current team: Colón

Youth career
- Newell's Old Boys

Senior career*
Years	Team	Apps	(Gls)
2018–2023	Newell's Old Boys	6	(0)
2019–2020	→ Independiente Rivadavia (loan)	19	(4)
2020–2021	→ Atlanta (loan)	10	(4)
2021	→ Platense (loan)	5	(0)
2022	→ Atlanta (loan)	33	(1)
2023–2025	Agropecuario	70	(13)
2025–2026	Patronato	32	(6)
2026–	Colón	3	(1)
- * Club domestic league appearances and goals as of 18:54, 20 March 2026 (UTC)

Julián Marcioni (born 19 March 1998) is an Argentine professional footballer who plays as a right winger for Colón.

== Career ==
Marcioni began his footballing career in the system of Newell's Old Boys, with his senior debut arriving in May 2018 during a Copa Argentina encounter with non-league Deportivo Rincón. In the following November, Marcioni was selected for his professional league debut by manager Omar De Felippe in a Primera División fixture against Defensa y Justicia; he was substituted on with eight minutes remaining of a goalless draw. Two further first-team appearances followed in league and cup, prior to Marcioni leaving on loan in July 2019 to Independiente Rivadavia of Primera B Nacional.

Marcioni netted goals against Nueva Chicago, Deportivo Morón, Platense and Alvarado whilst with La Lepra. August 2020 saw the forward leave Newell's on loan again, as he agreed terms with fellow second tier team Atlanta.

At the end of December 2022, Marcioni signed with Agropecuario.

== Career statistics ==
As of 28 June 2025.

Club statistics
Club	Division	League			Cup		Continental		Total	
Club	Division	Season	Apps	Goals	Apps	Goals	Apps	Goals	Apps	Goals
Newell's Old Boys	Primera División	2017-18	—		1	0	—		1	0
Newell's Old Boys	Primera División	2018-19	2	0	1	0	—		3	0
Newell's Old Boys	Primera División	2021	—		4	0	2	0	6	0
Newell's Old Boys	Total		2	0	6	0	2	0	10	0
Independiente Rivadavia	Primera B Nacional	2019-20	18	4	1	0	—		19	4
Atlanta	Primera B Nacional	2020-21	10	4	—		—		10	4
Atlanta	Primera B Nacional	2022	33	1	—		—		33	1
Atlanta	Total		43	5	0	0	0	0	43	5
Platense	Primera División	2021	5	0	—		—		5	0
Agropecuario	Primera B Nacional	2023	36	6	—		—		36	6
Agropecuario	Primera B Nacional	2024	34	7	1	0	—		35	7
Agropecuario	Total		70	13	1	0	0	0	71	13
Patronato	Primera B Nacional	2025	20	6	—		—		20	6
Career total			158	28	8	0	2	0	168	28
