= Lucas Fernández (footballer, born 1999) =

Argentine footballer

Personal information
- Date of birth: 12 June 1999 (age 27)
- Place of birth: Las Heras, Argentina
- Position: Forward

Team information
- Current team: Juventud Unida

Youth career
- Independiente Rivadavia

Senior career*
Years	Team	Apps	(Gls)
2018–2021	Independiente Rivadavia	22	(2)
2021	Jomo Cosmos	5	(1)
2022–	Juventud Unida	0	(0)
- * Club domestic league appearances and goals as of 21:56, 11 March 2022 (UTC)

Lucas Fernández (born 12 June 1999) is an Argentine professional footballer who plays as a forward for Juventud Unida.

== Career ==
Fernández's senior career started in the ranks of Independiente Rivadavia. He was initially selected as a substitute for Primera B Nacional matches against Los Andes, Central Córdoba and Platense in the opening period of the 2018–19 campaign but wasn't selected to come on. His professional debut arrived during a defeat to Mitre on 3 February 2019; he was subbed on for Matías Tissera with twenty minutes left.

== Career statistics ==
As of 10 February 2019.

Club statistics
Club	Season	League			Cup		Continental		Other		Total	
Club	Season	Division	Apps	Goals	Apps	Goals	Apps	Goals	Apps	Goals	Apps	Goals
Independiente Rivadavia	2018–19	Primera B Nacional	1	0	0	0	—		0	0	1	0
Career total			1	0	0	0	—		0	0	1	0
