= Andes Talleres Sport Club =

Argentinian association football club

Andes Talleres
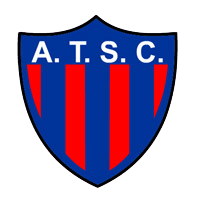
- Full name: Andes Talleres Sport Club
- Nicknames: Azulgrana ("Garnet-blue"); Matador ("Slayer"); Cervecero ("Beer-Producer")
- Founded: 9 July 1933; 92 years ago
- Ground: Ingelmo Nicolás Blázquez, Godoy Cruz, Mendoza, Mendoza Province
- Capacity: 11,000
- Chairman: José Quiñonez
- Manager: Diego Piozzini
- League: Federal C Tournament
- 2016: Second stage
- Website: http://www.andestalleres.com.ar/
Home colours	Away colours

Andes Talleres Sport Club is a football club in the city of Godoy Cruz, in Mendoza (Argentina), founded on July 9, 1933.

Play as a local in Ingelmo Nicolás Blázquez Stadium, which has an approximate capacity to accommodate 10,000 spectators.

Currently playing in the Federal C Tournament.

== History ==
It was born from the merger of the Athletic Club Tracción and Talleres Pacífico (founded on February 1, 1932), the merger was carried out on January 1, 1933, in an assembly called for that purpose, and an anniversary date was established on September 9, 1932. July 1933. We can say that 3 were the emblematic sports that throughout its history highlighted it at provincial, national and international level. These were football, basketball and roller hockey.

After several strong seasons in the Indoor Tournament, the club was invited to compete in the 2012 Argentino B by the Federal Council. The tournament has been reconstructed with the creation of regional zones, introducing a format intended to improve both sporting and economic organization. The Azulgrana club joined the same zone as Gimnasia y Esgrima, Guaymallén, Huracán Las Heras and San Martín, who were already participating in this tournament. They were also grouped with Gutiérrez, Huracán of San Rafael and Pacífico Sport Club, all of whom received invitations.

Between 2009 and 2012, the club was one of the most competitive teams from Mendoza in the Indoor Tournament. One notable result during that period was an 11–0 home victory over Fernández Alvarez (Tunuyán) in the group stage of the 2009 Indoor Tournament. The club's infrastructure, combined with its recent performances, contributed to its invitation to the Argentino B 2012/2013. However, results in that championship were not sufficient to maintain its position. The team finished last in Group C, behind Sportivo Atenas (Río Cuarto) and Huracán Las Heras, and was relegated.

== Rivalries ==
Andes Talleres's classic rival is Godoy Cruz Antonio Tomba, a neighborhood classic that has not been played since 1993, thanks to the "Azulgrana" promotions and the "Tomba" football debacle.

In addition, Andes Talleres has provincial classics such as Leonardo Murialdo and Gutiérrez Sport Club.

== International friendly ==
In 1970 Andes Talleres plays an international friendly in which it loses 2–0 before the Flamengo. On June 7, 1979, Andes Talleres played a friendly match with AC Milan of Italy, which won 3–2. In that party there were special guests like Roberto Perfumo. This has been the very last game played by Milan's mighty captain and Italy's international Gianni Rivera

== Honours ==
=== Regional ===
- Mendoza Football League (4): 1946, 1955, 1956, 1971.
