= Deportivo Guaymallén =

Argentine sports club

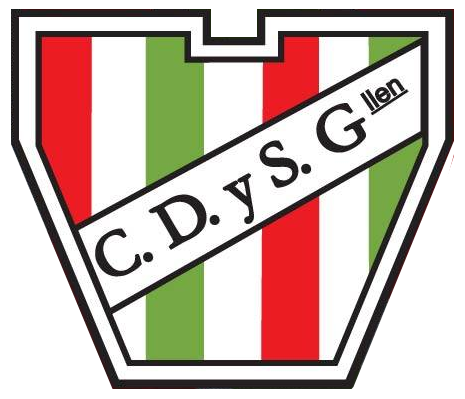
- Full name: Club Deportivo y Social Guaymallén
- Founded: 25 August 1918
- Ground: Hugo Pedro Alastra
- Capacity: 5,100
- League: Liga Mendocina de Fútbol
- Website: http://www.cdsguaymallen.com.ar/
Home colours	Away colours

Club Deportivo y Social Guaymallén is a sports club based in the Guaymallén Department of Mendoza, Argentina. Presently, it participates in the Liga Mendocina, one of the regional fifth tiers of Argentine football. Although many sports are practised in the club, Guaymallén is mostly known for its football team, which currently plays in the Torneo Argentino B, the regionalised 4th division of Argentine football league system.

== Honours ==
- Liga Mendocina de Fútbol (4): 2000, Clausura 2002, 2004, 2005
