= 2019–20 Club Atlético Sarmiento season =

Association football season

Sarmiento
2019–20 season
- President: Fernando Chiófalo
- Manager: Iván Delfino
- Stadium: Estadio Eva Perón
- Top goalscorer: League: Pablo Magnín (3); All: Pablo Magnín (3)

The 2019–20 season is Sarmiento's 3rd consecutive season in the second division of Argentine football, Primera B Nacional.

The season generally covers the period from 1 July 2019 to 30 June 2020.

== Review ==
=== Pre-season ===
Sebastián Cavallin was loaned to Bolivian Copa Simón Bolívar side Universitario de Sucre on 5 June 2019, while Daniel Garro agreed a move to Deportivo Maipú a day later. Matías Garrido was revealed as their third outgoing on 23 June, as Honduras outfit Olimpia announced him as a new signing. Nicolás Castro left for San Martín (T) on 29 June, twenty-four hours prior to Iván Etevenaux's contract expiring. June concluded with Guillermo Farré penning terms with Mitre. July began with the departures of Nicolás Miracco (Central Córdoba) and Guillermo Sotelo (Brown), before Iván Delfino secured his opening reinforcements on 3 July in Francisco Molina (Alvarado) and Fernando Núñez (Godoy Cruz, loan). On 4 July, Sotelo was joined in Adrogué at Brown by Ariel Kippes.

Claudio Pombo agreed to come to Sarmiento on 6 July, arriving from Atlético Tucumán of the Primera División. Three more leavers were confirmed on 12 July, as Sebastián Penco headed to Peru with Sport Boys while Leonardo Villalba and Nicolás Orsini signed for Central Córdoba and Lanús respectively. 15 July saw Pablo Magnín join from Temperley, on the same date that Gianfranco Ottaviani was loaned to Cañuelas on. Gabriel Graciani became Sarmiento's fifth incoming on 16 July. He joined from Olimpo, who completed loan deals with Sarmiento on 21 July for Maximiliano Méndez and Pablo Fernández. The club got two players on 23 July, with Federico Vismara and Fabio Vázquez arriving. Agropecuario were Sarmiento's first friendly opponents on 24 July.

Sarmiento met Agropecuario again in pre-season on 27 July, with the opposition leaving undefeated; unlike days prior. Santiago Rosa secured a loan move to Spanish football with Segunda División B's Peña Deportiva on 30 July. Gabriel Sanabria also sealed a move to European football that day, as he went to Greece with Levadiakos. Newell's Old Boys faced Sarmiento in pre-season matches on 31 July, as they each achieved a victory; Pablo Magnín scored twice in their 2–1 win. Joaquín Vivani joined Ferro Carril Oeste (GP) on 4 August. The loan arrival of Facundo Castelli (Instituto) was made official on 6 August. Also on 6 August, Rosario Central were met in friendlies. Sarmiento drew with Unión Santa Fe in a friendly on 9 August, prior to beating them in the other fixture.

Diego Cháves arrived from Deportivo Morón on 12 August. Enrique Taddei's move in from Olimpo was communicated on 13 August. 14 August saw Lautaro Geminiani put pen to paper on a contract from Patronato.

=== August ===
Sarmiento's Primera B Nacional campaign got underway with a goalless draw at the Estadio Eva Perón versus Santamarina on 17 August. They secured their first three points on matchday two as they edged a five-goal thriller with Instituto on 22 August. Pablo Magnín netted twice in that fixture, prior to scoring again a week later against San Martín (T).

== Squad ==
Squad No.	Nationality	Name	Position(s)	Date of Birth (age)	Signed from
Goalkeepers
	Argentina	Facundo Daffonchio	GK	2 February 1990 (age 36)	Atlético Tucumán
	Argentina	Manuel Vicentini	GK	19 April 1990 (age 36)	Boca Juniors
Defenders
	Argentina	Juan Antonini	CB	4 March 1999 (age 27)	Academy
	Argentina	Facundo Castet	LB	11 September 1998 (age 28)	Academy
	Argentina	Martín García	RB	25 August 1998 (age 28)	Academy
	Argentina	Lautaro Geminiani	RB	2 March 1991 (age 35)	Patronato
	Argentina	Lucas Landa	LB	3 April 1986 (age 40)	Guillermo Brown
	Argentina	Wilfredo Olivera	CB	4 May 1987 (age 39)	Atlético de Rafaela
	Argentina	Laureano Puñet	DF	20 August 1999 (age 27)	Academy
	Argentina	Bruno Rodríguez	DF	4 January 2000 (age 26)	Academy
	Argentina	Braian Salvareschi	DF	13 April 1999 (age 27)	Academy
	Argentina	Enrique Taddei	DF	17 June 1998 (age 28)	Olimpo
Midfielders
	Argentina	Fermín Antonini	MF	2 July 1997 (age 29)	Academy
	Argentina	Juan Caviglia	CM	16 June 1997 (age 29)	Academy
	Argentina	Maximiliano Fornari	LW	15 May 1995 (age 31)	Academy
	Argentina	Yamil Garnier	RM	22 December 1982 (age 43)	Colón
	Argentina	Gabriel Graciani	RM	28 November 1993 (age 32)	Olimpo
	Argentina	Franco Leys	CM	18 October 1993 (age 33)	Juventud Unida
	Argentina	Francisco Molina	LM	8 October 1990 (age 36)	Alvarado
	Argentina	Claudio Pombo	RM	28 April 1994 (age 32)	Atlético Tucumán
	Argentina	Fabio Vázquez	CM	19 February 1994 (age 32)	Cafetaleros de Tapachula
	Argentina	Federico Vismara	CM	9 May 1983 (age 43)	Chacarita Juniors
Forwards
	Argentina	Benjamín Borasi	FW	11 November 1997 (age 29)	Academy
	Argentina	Julián Brea	FW	10 October 1999 (age 27)	Academy
	Argentina	Facundo Castelli	CF	18 February 1995 (age 31)	Instituto (loan)
	Uruguay	Diego Cháves	CF	14 February 1986 (age 40)	Deportivo Morón
	Argentina	Ariel Cólzera	CF	15 April 1986 (age 40)	Juventud Unida
	Argentina	Pablo Magnín	CF	25 April 1990 (age 36)	Temperley
	Argentina	Fernando Núñez	RW	22 July 1995 (age 31)	Godoy Cruz (loan)
	Argentina	Sergio Quiroga	FW	7 June 1994 (age 32)	Argentinos Juniors
Out on loan					Loaned to
	Argentina	Sebastián Cavallin	FW	19 February 1997 (age 29)	Universitario de Sucre
	Argentina	Pablo Fernández	GK	14 August 1996 (age 30)	Olimpo
	Argentina	Maximiliano Méndez	DF	31 October 1995 (age 31)	Olimpo
	Argentina	Gianfranco Ottaviani	FW	4 June 1996 (age 30)	Cañuelas

== Transfers ==
Domestic transfer windows:
3 July 2019 to 24 September 2019
20 January 2020 to 19 February 2020.

=== Transfers in ===
Date from	Position	Nationality	Name	From	Ref.
3 July 2019	LM	Argentina	Francisco Molina	Alvarado	
6 July 2019	RM	Argentina	Claudio Pombo	Atlético Tucumán	
15 July 2019	CF	Argentina	Pablo Magnín	Temperley	
16 July 2019	RM	Argentina	Gabriel Graciani	Olimpo	
23 July 2019	CM	Argentina	Federico Vismara	Chacarita Juniors	
23 July 2019	CM	Argentina	Fabio Vázquez	Cafetaleros de Tapachula	
12 August 2019	CF	Uruguay	Diego Cháves	Deportivo Morón	
13 August 2019	DF	Argentina	Enrique Taddei	Olimpo	
14 August 2019	RB	Argentina	Lautaro Geminiani	Patronato	

=== Transfers out ===
Date from	Position	Nationality	Name	To	Ref.
23 June 2019	AM	Argentina	Matías Garrido	Olimpia	
30 June 2019	AM	Argentina	Iván Etevenaux	Released	
3 July 2019 (Note: Deal agreed on 6 June 2019)	MF	Argentina	Daniel Garro	Deportivo Maipú	
3 July 2019 (Note: Deal agreed on 29 June 2019)	LM	Argentina	Nicolás Castro	San Martín (T)	
3 July 2019 (Note: Deal agreed on 30 June 2019)	DM	Argentina	Guillermo Farré	Mitre	
3 July 2019 (Note: Deal agreed on 1 July 2019)	MF	Argentina	Nicolás Miracco	Central Córdoba	
3 July 2019 (Note: Deal agreed on 2 July 2019)	CB	Argentina	Guillermo Sotelo	Brown	
4 July 2019	CB	Argentina	Ariel Kippes	Brown	
12 July 2019	CF	Argentina	Sebastián Penco	Sport Boys	
12 July 2019	RW	Argentina	Leonardo Villalba	Central Córdoba	
12 July 2019	LW	Argentina	Nicolás Orsini	Lanús	
30 July 2019	AM	Argentina	Gabriel Sanabria	Levadiakos	
4 August 2019	RW	Argentina	Joaquín Vivani	Ferro Carril Oeste (GP)	

=== Loans in ===
Start date	Position	Nationality	Name	From	End date	Ref.
3 July 2019	RW	Argentina	Fernando Núñez	Godoy Cruz	30 June 2020	
6 August 2019	CF	Argentina	Facundo Castelli	Instituto	30 June 2020	

=== Loans out ===
Start date	Position	Nationality	Name	To	End date	Ref.
1 July 2019 (Note: Deal agreed on 5 June 2019)	FW	Argentina	Sebastián Cavallin	Universitario de Sucre	31 December 2019	
15 July 2019	FW	Argentina	Gianfranco Ottaviani	Cañuelas	30 June 2020	
21 July 2019	DF	Argentina	Maximiliano Méndez	Olimpo	30 June 2020	
21 July 2019	GK	Argentina	Pablo Fernández	Olimpo	30 June 2020	
30 July 2019	FW	Argentina	Santiago Rosa	Peña Deportiva	30 June 2020	

== Friendlies ==
=== Pre-season ===
Sarmiento met Agropecuario for two friendlies on 24 July, before meeting again days later for a further two encounters. The rest of their schedule was filled with matches against Primera División trio Newell's Old Boys, Rosario Central and Unión Santa Fe.

Win Draw Loss

24 July 2019 Friendly	Agropecuario	0–0	Sarmiento	Carlos Casares, Argentina
13:00 GMT-3		Mundo Ascenso; 35 min. match		Stadium: Estadio Ofelia Rosenzuaig

24 July 2019 Friendly	Agropecuario	1–2	Sarmiento	Carlos Casares, Argentina
	G. Urquijo	Mundo Ascenso; 35 min. match	B. Borasi; B. Liuzzi	Stadium: Estadio Ofelia Rosenzuaig

27 July 2019 Friendly	Sarmiento	0–0	Agropecuario	Junín, Argentina
		Infoeme		Stadium: Estadio Eva Perón

27 July 2019 Friendly	Sarmiento	0–2	Agropecuario	Junín, Argentina
		Infoeme	G. Urquijo; F. Colela	Stadium: Estadio Eva Perón

31 July 2019 Friendly	Newell's Old Boys	1–2	Sarmiento	Rosario, Argentina
	L. Albertengo	Sarmiento; Grupo La Provincia; 60 min. match	P. Magnín	Stadium: Centro de Entrenamiento Jorge Griffa

31 July 2019 Friendly	Newell's Old Boys	2–0	Sarmiento	Rosario, Argentina
	Goal	Sarmiento; 60 min. match		Stadium: Centro de Entrenamiento Jorge Griffa

6 August 2019 Friendly	Rosario Central	0–1	Sarmiento	Arroyo Seco, Argentina
		Rosario Central; Grupo La Provincia; 60 min. match	G. Graciani 22'	Stadium: Predio Arroyo Seco

6 August 2019 Friendly	Rosario Central	1–0	Sarmiento	Arroyo Seco, Argentina
	J. Mazzaco 64'	Rosario Central; 60 min. match		Stadium: Predio Arroyo Seco

9 August 2019 Friendly	Unión Santa Fe	1–1	Sarmiento	Santa Fe, Argentina
10:00 GMT-3	W. Bou (pen.)	Sarmiento; Vía País	P. Magnín	Stadium: Estadio 15 de Abril

9 August 2019 Friendly	Unión Santa Fe	0–1	Sarmiento	Santa Fe, Argentina
		Sarmiento; Vía País	F. Núñez	Stadium: Estadio 15 de Abril

== Competitions ==
=== Primera B Nacional ===
==== Results summary ====
Overall								Home						Away					
Pld	W	D	L	GF	GA	GD	Pts	W	D	L	GF	GA	GD	W	D	L	GF	GA	GD
3	2	1	0	6	3	+3	7	1	1	0	3	1	+2	1	0	0	3	2	+1

Last updated: 3 September 2019.
Source: Soccerway

==== Matches ====
The fixtures for the 2019–20 league season were announced on 1 August 2019, with a new format of split zones being introduced. Santamarina were drawn in Zone B.

Win Draw Loss

17 August 2019 1	Sarmiento	0–0	Santamarina	Junín, Argentina
15:30 GMT-3		Sarmiento; Diario Democracia; Soccerway		Stadium: Estadio Eva Perón; Referee: Carlos Gareano (Argentina)

22 August 2019 2	Instituto	2–3	Sarmiento	Córdoba, Argentina
19:15 GMT-3	M. Bajamich 3'; M. Pino 30'	Sarmiento; La Voz del Interior; Soccerway	C. Pombo 2'; P. Magnín 28' (pen.), 42'	Stadium: Estadio Presidente Perón; Referee: Adrián Franklin (Argentina)

31 August 2019 3	Sarmiento	3–1	San Martín (T)	Junín, Argentina
15:30 GMT-3	P. Magnín 23'; G. Rodríguez 84' (o.g.); S. Quiroga 90+4'	Sarmiento; La Voz del Interior; Soccerway	L. González 88'	Stadium: Estadio Eva Perón; Referee: Pablo Echavarría (Argentina)

7 September 2019 4	Almagro	–	Sarmiento	José Ingenieros, Argentina
15:05 GMT-3				Stadium: Estadio Almagro

== Squad statistics ==
=== Appearances and goals ===
No.	Pos.	Nationality	Name	League		Cup		League Cup		Continental		Other		Total		Discipline		Ref
No.	Pos.	Nationality	Name	Apps	Goals	Apps	Goals	Apps	Goals	Apps	Goals	Apps	Goals	Apps	Goals	Yellow card	Red card	Ref
–	GK	Argentina	Facundo Daffonchio	0	0	—		—		—		0	0	0	0	0	0	
–	GK	Argentina	Pablo Fernández	0	0	—		—		—		0	0	0	0	0	0	
–	GK	Argentina	Manuel Vicentini	3	0	—		—		—		0	0	3	0	1	0	
–	CB	Argentina	Juan Antonini	2(1)	0	—		—		—		0	0	2(1)	0	0	0	
–	LB	Argentina	Facundo Castet	3	0	—		—		—		0	0	3	0	0	0	
–	RB	Argentina	Martín García	1	0	—		—		—		0	0	1	0	1	0	
–	RB	Argentina	Lautaro Geminiani	2	0	—		—		—		0	0	2	0	2	0	
–	LB	Argentina	Lucas Landa	2	0	—		—		—		0	0	2	0	0	0	
–	DF	Argentina	Maximiliano Méndez	0	0	—		—		—		0	0	0	0	0	0	
–	CB	Argentina	Wilfredo Olivera	1	0	—		—		—		0	0	1	0	0	0	
–	DF	Argentina	Laureano Puñet	0	0	—		—		—		0	0	0	0	0	0	
–	DF	Argentina	Bruno Rodríguez	0	0	—		—		—		0	0	0	0	0	0	
–	DF	Argentina	Braian Salvareschi	1	0	—		—		—		0	0	1	0	0	0	
–	DF	Argentina	Enrique Taddei	0	0	—		—		—		0	0	0	0	0	0	
–	MF	Argentina	Fermín Antonini	0(1)	0	—		—		—		0	0	0(1)	0	1	0	
–	CM	Argentina	Juan Caviglia	0	0	—		—		—		0	0	0	0	0	0	
–	LW	Argentina	Maximiliano Fornari	2(1)	0	—		—		—		0	0	2(1)	0	1	0	
–	RM	Argentina	Yamil Garnier	0	0	—		—		—		0	0	0	0	0	0	
–	RM	Argentina	Gabriel Graciani	2	0	—		—		—		0	0	2	0	0	0	
–	CM	Argentina	Franco Leys	0	0	—		—		—		0	0	0	0	0	0	
–	LM	Argentina	Francisco Molina	2	0	—		—		—		0	0	2	0	0	0	
–	RM	Argentina	Claudio Pombo	3	1	—		—		—		0	0	3	1	1	0	
–	CM	Argentina	Fabio Vázquez	0	0	—		—		—		0	0	0	0	0	0	
–	CM	Argentina	Federico Vismara	3	0	—		—		—		0	0	3	0	1	0	
–	FW	Argentina	Benjamín Borasi	1	0	—		—		—		0	0	1	0	0	0	
–	FW	Argentina	Julián Brea	0	0	—		—		—		0	0	0	0	0	0	
–	CF	Argentina	Facundo Castelli	0(2)	0	—		—		—		0	0	0(2)	0	1	0	
–	FW	Argentina	Sebastián Cavallin	0	0	—		—		—		0	0	0	0	0	0	
–	CF	Uruguay	Diego Cháves	0	0	—		—		—		0	0	0	0	0	0	
–	CF	Argentina	Ariel Cólzera	2	0	—		—		—		0	0	2	0	0	0	
–	CF	Argentina	Pablo Magnín	3	3	—		—		—		0	0	3	3	0	0	
–	RW	Argentina	Fernando Núñez	0(1)	0	—		—		—		0	0	0(1)	0	0	0	
–	FW	Argentina	Gianfranco Ottaviani	0	0	—		—		—		0	0	0	0	0	0	
–	FW	Argentina	Sergio Quiroga	0(3)	1	—		—		—		0	0	0(3)	1	1	0	
Own goals				—	0	—		—		—		—	0	—	0	—	—	—

Statistics accurate as of 3 September 2019.

=== Goalscorers ===
Rank	Pos	No.	Nat	Name	League	Cup	League Cup	Continental	Other	Total	Ref
1	CF	–	Argentina	Pablo Magnín	3	–	—	—	0	3	
2	RM	–	Argentina	Claudio Pombo	1	–	—	—	0	1	
2	FW	–	Argentina	Sergio Quiroga	1	–	—	—	0	1	
Own goals					1	–	—	—	0	1	
Totals					6	–	—	—	0	6	—
