= Daniel Garro =

Argentine footballer

Personal information
- Full name: Daniel Roberto Garro
- Date of birth: 25 October 1990 (age 36)
- Place of birth: San Luis, Argentina
- Position: Midfielder

Senior career*
Years	Team	Apps	(Gls)
- CAI San Luis
2011	Juventud Unida Universitario	8	(1)
2012–2016	Estudiantes (SL)		
2016–2019	Sarmiento	11	(0)
2017	→ Gimnasia y Esgrima (loan)	0	(0)
2017–2018	→ Estudiantes (RC) (loan)	20	(0)
2019–2020	Deportivo Maipú	18	(2)
- * Club domestic league appearances and goals

Daniel Roberto Garro (born 25 October 1990) is an Argentine professional footballer who plays as a midfielder.

== Career ==
Garro, after a stint with CAI San Luis, appeared for Juventud Unida Universitario. He made eight appearances and scored once, versus Estudiantes of Río Cuarto, as they finished bottom of their second stage table. In 2012, Garro completed a move to San Luis' Estudiantes in Torneo Argentino C. Within seven months, they won promotion to Torneo Argentino B. He then scored six goals in thirty-three games in tier four, as they won a second successive promotion to Torneo Argentino A. A further two seasons later, in 2014, Garro experienced a third promotion to Primera B Nacional; where he'd score three goals.

On 11 August 2016, Garro joined Primera División side Sarmiento. He made his bow in top-flight football against Arsenal de Sarandí on 26 August, which was one of a total seven matches he participated in during 2016–17; as the club were relegated - though Garro spent the final month of the season on loan in Torneo Federal A with Gimnasia y Esgrima. Garro left on loan again ahead of 2017–18, agreeing terms with Río Cuarto's Estudiantes. He featured in twenty encounters, prior to returning to Sarmiento. He played in four fixtures in the first part of 2018–19, including against ex-club Gimnasia y Esgrima.

July 2019 saw Garro join Deportivo Maipú in Torneo Federal A. He scored two goals in eighteen matches in 2019–20, prior to terminating his contract amidst the COVID-19 pandemic.

== Career statistics ==
As of 8 July 2020.

Appearances and goals by club, season and competition
Club	Season	League			Cup		League Cup		Continental		Other		Total	
Club	Season	Division	Apps	Goals	Apps	Goals	Apps	Goals	Apps	Goals	Apps	Goals	Apps	Goals
Juventud Unida Universitario	2010–11	Torneo Argentino A	8	1	0	0	—		—		0	0	8	1
Juventud Unida Universitario	2011–12	Torneo Argentino A	0	0	0	0	—		—		0	0	0	0
Juventud Unida Universitario	Total		8	1	0	0	—		—		0	0	8	1
Estudiantes (SL)	2012–13	Torneo Argentino B	33	6	0	0	—		—		0	0	33	6
Estudiantes (SL)	2013–14	Torneo Argentino A	29	4	1	0	—		—		1 (Note: Appearance(s) in the Torneo Argentino A play-offs)	0	31	4
Estudiantes (SL)	2014	Torneo Federal A	13	0	0	0	—		—		0	0	13	0
Estudiantes (SL)	2015	Primera B Nacional	24	0	0	0	—		—		0	0	24	0
Estudiantes (SL)	2016	Primera B Nacional	16	3	0	0	—		—		0	0	16	3
Estudiantes (SL)	Total		115	13	1	0	—		—		1	0	117	13
Sarmiento	2016–17	Primera División	7	0	0	0	—		—		0	0	7	0
Sarmiento	2017–18	Primera B Nacional	0	0	0	0	—		—		0	0	0	0
Sarmiento	2018–19	Primera B Nacional	4	0	0	0	—		—		0	0	4	0
Sarmiento	Total		11	0	0	0	—		—		0	0	11	0
Gimnasia y Esgrima (loan)	2016–17	Torneo Federal A	0	0	0	0	—		—		5 (Note: Appearance(s) in the Torneo Federal A play-offs)	0	5	0
Estudiantes (RC) (loan)	2017–18	Torneo Federal A	20	0	1	0	—		—		0	0	21	0
Deportivo Maipú	2019–20	Primera B Nacional	18	2	1	0	—		—		0	0	19	2
Career total			172	16	3	0	—		—		6	0	181	16
