= Nicolás Castro (footballer, born 1990) =

Argentine footballer

Personal information
- Full name: Nicolás Eduardo Castro
- Date of birth: 11 May 1990 (age 36)
- Place of birth: Ranchos, Argentina
- Height: 1.81 m (5 ft 11 in)
- Positions: Winger; midfielder

Team information
- Current team: San Martín Tucumán

Youth career
- 2004–2009: Gimnasia y Esgrima

Senior career*
Years	Team	Apps	(Gls)
2009–2013	Gimnasia y Esgrima	0	(0)
2009–2010	→ Liniers (loan)	23	(1)
2012–2013	→ Juventud Unida (loan)	9	(0)
2013–2015	Unión Mar del Plata	67	(8)
2016–2017	Crucero del Norte	56	(7)
2017–2018	Quilmes	13	(0)
2018–2019	Sarmiento	27	(2)
2019–2020	San Martín Tucumán	21	(2)
2020–2022	Arsenal de Sarandí	44	(0)
2022–2023	Patronato	36	(3)
2023–2024	Platense	41	(6)
2024–2025	Atlético Tucumán	28	(1)
2025–	San Martín Tucumán	22	(1)
- * Club domestic league appearances and goals as of 17:32, 4 May 2026 (UTC)

Nicolás Eduardo Castro (born 11 May 1990) is an Argentine professional footballer who plays as a winger or midfielder for San Martín Tucumán.

== Career ==
Castro started with Gimnasia y Esgrima, signing in 2004. In 2009, Castro was loaned to Liniers of Torneo Argentino B. One goal in twenty-three appearances followed. He returned to his parent club in 2010, subsequently making his debut in the Copa Argentina versus Sportivo Desamparados on 30 November 2011. A second loan spell away arrived in August 2012, with the midfielder signing for Juventud Unida Universitario. He made his bow in a 3–1 loss to Rivadavia on 26 August. Castro left Gimnasia y Esgrima in 2013, joining Unión Mar del Plata. Season two ended with promotion.

After scoring goals versus Guaraní Antonio Franco, Independiente Rivadavia and Chacarita Juniors in his debut second tier campaign as they were relegated, Castro then completed a move to Crucero del Norte to remain in Primera B Nacional. Castro played in fifty-seven games and netted seven goals across all competitions in two seasons with Chacarita Juniors, with his last two goals coming in a 3–0 win over Estudiantes in April 2017. In the succeeding August, having suffered his second career relegation, Quilmes completed the signing of Castro. Thirteen appearances occurred with them.

Ten months later, Castro agreed to join his seventh senior team in Sarmiento. His first appearance was in a fixture with Olimpo on 26 August, as he featured for eighty-five minutes before being substituted for Juan Caviglia.

== Career statistics ==
As of 27 March 2019.

Appearances and goals by club, season and competition
Club	Season	League			Cup		Continental		Other		Total	
Club	Season	Division	Apps	Goals	Apps	Goals	Apps	Goals	Apps	Goals	Apps	Goals
Gimnasia y Esgrima	2009–10	Primera División	0	0	0	0	—		0	0	0	0
Gimnasia y Esgrima	2010–11	Primera División	0	0	0	0	—		0	0	0	0
Gimnasia y Esgrima	2011–12	Primera B Nacional	0	0	1	0	—		0	0	1	0
Gimnasia y Esgrima	2012–13	Primera B Nacional	0	0	0	0	—		0	0	0	0
Gimnasia y Esgrima	Total		0	0	1	0	—		0	0	1	0
Liniers (loan)	2009–10	Torneo Argentino B	23	1	0	0	—		0	0	23	1
Juventud Unida Universitario (loan)	2012–13	Torneo Argentino A	9	0	0	0	—		0	0	9	0
Unión Mar del Plata	2013–14	Torneo Argentino A	18	4	1	0	—		0	0	19	4
Unión Mar del Plata	2014	Torneo Federal A	10	0	0	0	—		1 (Note: Appearance(s) in the Torneo Federal A play-offs)	0	11	0
Unión Mar del Plata	2015	Primera B Nacional	39	4	0	0	—		0	0	39	4
Unión Mar del Plata	Total		67	8	0	0	—		1	0	68	8
Crucero del Norte	2016	Primera B Nacional	20	1	1	0	—		0	0	21	1
Crucero del Norte	2016–17	Primera B Nacional	36	6	0	0	—		0	0	36	6
Crucero del Norte	Total		56	7	1	0	—		0	0	57	7
Quilmes	2017–18	Primera B Nacional	13	0	0	0	—		0	0	13	0
Sarmiento	2018–19	Primera B Nacional	17	0	0	0	—		0	0	17	0
Career total			185	16	3	0	—		1	0	189	16
