= Yamil Garnier =

Argentine footballer

Personal information
- Full name: Luis Yamil Garnier
- Date of birth: 22 December 1982 (age 43)
- Place of birth: Concepción del Uruguay, Argentina
- Height: 1.78 m (5 ft 10 in)
- Position: Right-back

Senior career*
| Years | Team | Apps | (Gls) |
| 2001–2004 | Atlético Uruguay | 14 | (4) |
| 2004–2010 | Tiro Federal | 122 | (6) |
| 2005–2006 | → Juventud Antoniana (loan) | 32 | (3) |
| 2010–2011 | Racing de Córdoba | 36 | (4) |
| 2011–2014 | Sarmiento | 73 | (7) |
| 2014–2017 | Colón | 51 | (1) |
| 2017–2024 | Sarmiento | 78 | (4) |
- * Club domestic league appearances and goals

Luis Yamil Garnier (born 22 December 1982) is an Argentine former professional footballer who plays as a right-back.

== Career ==
Garnier's senior footballing career stated in 2001 with local team Atlético Uruguay, he stayed with them for three years and scored four goals in fourteen appearances in Torneo Argentino B. 2004 saw Garnier join Primera B Nacional's Tiro Federal, the club were promoted to the 2005–06 Argentine Primera División in his first season. However, he spent that season out on loan to second-tier club Juventud Antoniana. Thirty-two games and three goals followed for Garnier in Salta. He returned to a recently relegated Tiro Federal in 2006. Leaving four years later, after 122 appearances.

Garnier departed the club to join Racing de Córdoba of Torneo Argentino A. He spent just one season with Racing, 2010–11, playing thirty-six times. Primera B Metropolitana team Sarmiento signed Garnier in 2011. Just like with Tiro Federal, Garnier achieved promotion in his first season with a club as Sarmiento won the 2011–12 campaign to gain entry into Argentina's second tier. He participated in seventy-four matches for Sarmiento in Primera B Nacional over two seasons. In July 2014, Garnier moved clubs once more as he agreed to sign for fellow Primera B Nacional club Colón.

For the third time in his career, his debut season with a team ended in promotion; this time as Colón won a place in the revamped Argentine Primera División. He made his top-flight debut on 3 March 2015 in a goalless draw versus Banfield. On 21 July 2017, Garnier left Colón to rejoin former club Sarmiento. His second debut for Sarmiento came on 18 September in a goalless draw versus Quilmes.

== Career statistics ==
As of 29 May 2018.

Club statistics
| Club | Season | League | | | Cup (Note: Includes the Copa Argentina) | | League Cup | | Continental | | Other | | Total | |
| Club | Season | Division | Apps | Goals | Apps | Goals | Apps | Goals | Apps | Goals | Apps | Goals | Apps | Goals |
|---|---|---|---|---|---|---|---|---|---|---|---|---|---|---|
| Colón | 2014 | Primera B Nacional | 18 | 0 | 2 | 0 | — | | — | | 0 | 0 | 20 | 0 |
| Colón | 2015 | Primera División | 21 | 0 | 1 | 0 | — | | — | | 3 (Note: Three appearances in 2015 Primera División play-offs) | 0 | 25 | 0 |
| Colón | 2016 | Primera División | 2 | 0 | 0 | 0 | — | | — | | 0 | 0 | 2 | 0 |
| Colón | 2016–17 | Primera División | 10 | 1 | 1 | 0 | — | | — | | 0 | 0 | 11 | 1 |
| Colón | Total | | 51 | 1 | 4 | 0 | — | | — | | 3 | 0 | 58 | 1 |
| Sarmiento | 2017–18 | Primera B Nacional | 22 | 2 | 1 | 0 | — | | — | | 3 (Note: Three appearances in 2017–18 Primera B Nacional play-offs) | 0 | 26 | 2 |
| Career total | | | 73 | 3 | 5 | 0 | — | | — | | 6 | 0 | 84 | 3 |

== Honours ==
Tiro Federal

- Primera B Nacional: 2004–05

Sarmiento

- Primera B Metropolitana: 2011–12
