= Caviglia =

Caviglia is an Italian surname. Notable people with the surname include:

- Enrico Caviglia (1862–1945), Italian General
- Enrique Caviglia (born 1956), Argentine retired tennis player
- Giovanni Battista Caviglia (1770–1845), Italian navigator and Egyptologist
- Juan Caviglia (born 1997), Argentine footballer
- Juan Nicolás Caviglia (1929–2022), Argentine gymnast
- María Caviglia (1895–1985), Argentine politician
- Orestes Caviglia (1893–1971), Argentine actor and film director
