= Juan Caviglia =

Juan Caviglia may refer to:

- Juan Caviglia (footballer) (born 1997), Argentine footballer
- Juan Caviglia (gymnast) (1929–2022), Argentine gymnast
