= Gimnasia y Esgrima =

Gimnasia y Esgrima (Gymnastics and Fencing) is the name of several sports clubs in Argentina:

- Gimnasia y Esgrima de Buenos Aires (GEBA)
- Gimnasia y Esgrima de Comodoro Rivadavia
- Gimnasia y Esgrima de Concepción del Uruguay
- Gimnasia y Esgrima de Jujuy (GEJ)
- Club de Gimnasia y Esgrima La Plata (CGE or GELP)
  - Gimnasia y Esgrima (basketball)
- Gimnasia y Esgrima de Mendoza
- Club Gimnasia y Esgrima de Rosario
- Gimnasia y Esgrima de Santa Fe
