= Nicolás Castro =

Nicolás Castro may refer to:

- Nicolás Castro (footballer, born 1990), Argentine footballer
- Nicolás Castro (footballer, born 2000), Argentine footballer
