= Cavaglio =

Cavaglio may refer to:

- Cavaglio d'Agogna, municipality in the Province of Novara in the Italian region Piedmont
- Cavaglio-Spoccia, in the Province of Verbano-Cusio-Ossola in the Italian region Piedmont

== See also ==
- Cavaglia
- Caviglia
- Cavigliano
