= Gimnasia =

Gimnasia may refer to:

- Club de Gimnasia y Esgrima La Plata, an Argentine football club
- Club Gimnasia y Esgrima de Mendoza, an Argentine football club
- Gimnasia Esgrima Comodoro Rivadavia, an Argentine football club
- Gimnasia y Esgrima de Comodoro Rivadavia, an Argentine basketball and handball club
- Gimnasia y Esgrima de Jujuy, an Argentine football club
- Gimnasia y Tiro de Salta, an Argentine football club
- Gimnasia y Esgrima de Santa Fe, an Argentine football club
- Club Gimnasia y Esgrima (Concepción del Uruguay), an Argentine football club
- Gimnàstic de Tarragona, a Spanish football club
- Gymnasts, people who participate in the sports of either artistic gymnastics or rhythmic gymnastics
