= Gonzalo Rodríguez (footballer, born 1990) =

Argentine footballer

Personal information
- Full name: Gonzalo Emanuel Rodríguez
- Date of birth: 18 September 1990 (age 36)
- Place of birth: Aguilares, Argentina
- Height: 1.78 m (5 ft 10 in)
- Position: Forward

Team information
- Current team: San Martín Tucumán

Senior career*
Years	Team	Apps	(Gls)
2009	Deportivo Aguilares	0	(0)
2010–2013	San Martín T.	39	(2)
2013–2014	San Jorge	22	(3)
2014–2021	San Martín T.	173	(24)
2021–2023	Ferro Carril Oeste	14	(3)
2023–2024	Gimnasia Jujuy	19	(2)
2024–	San Martín T.	50	(2)
- * Club domestic league appearances and goals as of 17:43, 4 May 2026 (UTC)

Gonzalo Emanuel Rodríguez (born 18 September 1990) is an Argentine professional footballer who plays as a forward for San Martín Tucumán.

== Career ==
Rodríguez began his career with local club Deportivo Aguilares in 2009, though he failed to feature for the Torneo Argentino C side. Primera B Nacional's San Martín completed the signing of Rodríguez in 2010. He subsequently made five appearances in the 2009–10 Primera B Nacional, including his professional debut against Defensa y Justicia on 6 February 2010. Three seasons later, in the 2012–13 Torneo Argentino A following relegation, he scored the first goals of his senior career in March 2013 during a 2–2 draw with Guaraní Antonio Franco. Months later, fellow third tier outfit San Jorge signed Rodríguez on 7 July.

He achieved twenty-three appearances and scored four goals, including two in separate matches versus ex-club San Martín, in all competitions in the 2013–14 Torneo Argentino A season for San Jorge. At the conclusion of that campaign, San Martín resigned Rodríguez. In the subsequent four years with the team, Rodríguez netted twenty-one times in one hundred and ten league fixtures as they rose from Torneo Federal A to the Argentine Primera División. His first appearance in the top-flight arrived in August 2018 against Unión Santa Fe.

== Career statistics ==
As of 4 October 2018.

Club statistics
Club	Season	League			Cup (Note: Includes the Copa Argentina)		League Cup		Continental		Other		Total	
Club	Season	Division	Apps	Goals	Apps	Goals	Apps	Goals	Apps	Goals	Apps	Goals	Apps	Goals
San Martín	2009–10	Primera B Nacional	5	0	0	0	—		—		0	0	5	0
San Martín	2010–11	Primera B Nacional	4	0	0	0	—		—		0	0	4	0
San Martín	2011–12	Torneo Argentino A	20	0	0	0	—		—		0	0	20	0
San Martín	2012–13	Torneo Argentino A	10	2	1	0	—		—		2 (Note: Two appearances in the 2012–13 Torneo Argentino A play-offs)	0	13	2
San Martín	Total		39	2	1	0	—		—		2	0	42	2
San Jorge	2013–14	Torneo Argentino A	22	3	1	1	—		—		0	0	23	4
San Martín	2014	Torneo Federal A	11	0	3	1	—		—		0	0	14	1
San Martín	2015	Torneo Federal A	26	4	1	0	—		—		4 (Note: Four appearances in the 2015 Torneo Federal A play-offs)	1 (Note: One goal in the 2015 Torneo Federal A play-offs)	31	5
San Martín	2016	Torneo Federal A	12	1	0	0	—		—		7 (Note: Seven appearances in the 2016 Torneo Federal A play-offs)	3 (Note: Three goals in the 2016 Torneo Federal A play-offs)	19	4
San Martín	2016–17	Primera B Nacional	33	6	0	0	—		—		0	0	33	6
San Martín	2017–18	Primera B Nacional	22	4	0	0	—		—		5 (Note: Five appearances in the 2017–18 Primera B Nacional play-offs)	1 (Note: One goal in the 2017–18 Primera B Nacional play-offs)	27	5
San Martín	2018–19	Primera División	6	0	1	0	—		—		0	0	7	0
San Martín	Total		110	15	5	1	—		—		16	5	131	21
Career total			171	20	6	2	—		—		18	5	195	27

== Honours ==
San Martín

- Torneo Federal A: 2016
