= Joaquín Vivani =

Argentine footballer

Personal information
- Date of birth: 17 January 1995 (age 31)
- Place of birth: Nueve de Julio, Argentina
- Height: 1.68 m (5 ft 6 in)
- Position: Forward

Team information
- Current team: Villa Mitre

Youth career
- 1999–2005: Atlético 9 de Julio
- Boca Juniors
- Atlético 9 de Julio
- 2013–2017: Sarmiento

Senior career*
Years	Team	Apps	(Gls)
2011–2013	Once Tigres	20	(1)
2017–2020	Sarmiento	21	(2)
2019–2020	→ Ferro de General Pico (loan)	21	(1)
2020	Real Pilar	0	(0)
2021–2023	Ferro de General Pico	86	(9)
2021–2022	→ Indep. Rivadavia (loan)	4	(0)
2024–	Villa Mitre	41	(1)
- * Club domestic league appearances and goals as of 17:10, 29 May 2025 (UTC)

Joaquín Vivani (born 17 January 1995) is an Argentine professional footballer who plays as a forward for Villa Mitre.

== Career ==
Vivani is a product of the Atlético 9 de Julio and Boca Juniors academies, with the forward going on to join Once Tigres. He featured in Torneo Argentino C in 2011, making three appearances as they won promotion to Torneo Argentino B. One goal in seventeen matches followed in the fourth tier. In 2013, Vivani joined Primera B Nacional side Sarmiento. He was moved into their senior set-up in the 2016–17 season, with the club now in the Primera División. His debut in professional football came on 8 May 2017 versus Banfield, before he scored twice in his second appearance against Patronato; netting as a second-half substitute in a 2–2 draw.

Vivani spent the 2019–20 campaign out on loan in Torneo Federal A with Ferro Carril Oeste. He scored once, versus Círculo Deportivo, in twenty-three fixtures for them. In November 2020, Vivani signed with Real Pilar. He returned to Ferro Carril Oeste in February 2021.

== Career statistics ==
As of 7 September 2020.

Appearances and goals by club, season and competition
Club	Season	League			Cup		Continental		Other		Total	
Club	Season	Division	Apps	Goals	Apps	Goals	Apps	Goals	Apps	Goals	Apps	Goals
Once Tigres	2011	Torneo Argentino C	3	0	0	0	—		0	0	3	0
Once Tigres	2011–12	Torneo Argentino B	17	1	0	0	—		0	0	17	1
Once Tigres	Total		20	1	0	0	—		0	0	20	1
Sarmiento	2016–17	Primera División	6	2	1	0	—		0	0	7	2
Sarmiento	2017–18	Primera B Nacional	9	0	0	0	—		0	0	9	0
Sarmiento	2018–19	Primera B Nacional	6	0	1	0	—		0	0	7	0
Sarmiento	2019–20	Primera B Nacional	0	0	0	0	—		0	0	0	0
Sarmiento	Total		21	2	2	0	—		0	0	23	2
Ferro Carril Oeste (loan)	2019–20	Torneo Federal A	21	1	2	0	—		0	0	23	1
Career total			62	4	4	0	—		0	0	66	3
