= Wilfredo Olivera =

Argentine footballer

Personal information
- Date of birth: 4 May 1987 (age 39)
- Place of birth: Rafaela, Argentina
- Height: 1.88 m (6 ft 2 in)
- Position: Centre-back

Team information
- Current team: Racing de Córdoba

Senior career*
Years	Team	Apps	(Gls)
2007–2011	Libertad	90	(5)
2011–2014	Quilmes	34	(2)
2014	Colón	5	(0)
2015–2017	Talleres	36	(5)
2017–2018	Atlético de Rafaela	10	(0)
2018–2020	Sarmiento	39	(4)
2020–2022	Belgrano	43	(0)
2023	San Martín de Tucumán	8	(0)
2023	Guillermo Brown	14	(2)
2024–	Racing de Córdoba	34	(1)
- * Club domestic league appearances and goals as of 17:20, 15 August 2025 (UTC)

Wilfredo Olivera (born 4 May 1987) is an Argentine professional footballer who plays as a centre-back for Racing de Córdoba.

== Career ==
Libertad were Olivera's first senior team, he made his debut for the club in 2007 and remained until 2011 following ninety-one matches and six goals. In June 2011, Olivera joined Quilmes of Primera B Nacional. Four appearances followed in his first season, which ended with promotion to the 2012–13 Argentine Primera División. Olivera had a short spell with Colón in 2014, prior to joining Talleres in Torneo Federal A in the following January. He made thirty-eight appearances and netted five times as Talleres rose from tier three to tier one after back-to-back promotions. He failed to appear for Talleres in the Primera División during 2016–17.

July 2017 saw Olivera depart Talleres to play in Primera B Nacional with Atlético de Rafaela. His first appearance for Rafaela came during an away win over Gimnasia y Esgrima on 15 September. On 30 June 2018, Olivera signed for Sarmiento.

== Career statistics ==
As of 4 September 2018.

Club statistics
Club	Season	League			Cup (Note: Includes the Copa Argentina)		League Cup		Continental		Other		Total	
Club	Season	Division	Apps	Goals	Apps	Goals	Apps	Goals	Apps	Goals	Apps	Goals	Apps	Goals
Quilmes	2011–12	Primera B Nacional	4	0	2	0	—		—		0	0	6	0
Quilmes	2012–13	Primera División	23	2	0	0	—		—		0	0	23	2
Quilmes	2013–14	Primera División	7	0	0	0	—		—		0	0	7	0
Quilmes	Total		34	2	2	0	—		—		0	0	36	2
Colón	2014	Primera B Nacional	5	0	1	0	—		—		0	0	6	0
Talleres	2015	Torneo Federal A	23	3	0	0	—		—		0	0	23	3
Talleres	2016	Primera B Nacional	13	2	2	0	—		—		0	0	15	2
Talleres	2016–17	Primera División	0	0	0	0	—		—		0	0	0	0
Talleres	Total		36	5	2	0	—		—		0	0	38	5
Atlético de Rafaela	2017–18	Primera B Nacional	10	0	1	0	—		—		1 (Note: One appearance in 2017–18 Primera B Nacional play-offs)	0	12	0
Sarmiento	2018–19	Primera B Nacional	2	1	0	0	—		—		0	0	2	1
Career total			87	8	6	0	—		—		1	0	94	8

== Honours ==
Talleres

- Torneo Federal A: 2015
- Primera B Nacional: 2016
