= 2010–11 Torneo Argentino A =

XVI Torneo Argentino A
- Season: 2010–11
- Champions: Guillermo Brown (1st divisional title)
- Promoted: Guillermo Brown; Desamparados
- Relegated: 9 de Julio (R); Estudiantes (RC); Villa Mitre
- Top goalscorer: Gonzalo Klusener (24 goals)

The 2010–11 Argentine Torneo Argentino A was the sixteenth season of third division professional football in Argentina. A total of 24 teams competed; the champion was promoted to Primera B Nacional.

== Club information ==
Locations of the 2010−11 season teams

=== Zone A (South) ===
Club	City	Stadium
Cipolletti	Cipolletti	La Visera de Cemento
Douglas Haig	Pergamino	Miguel Morales
Guillermo Brown	Puerto Madryn	Raul Conti
Huracán	Tres Arroyos	Roberto Lorenzo Bottino
Rivadavia	Buenos Aires	El Coliseo
Santamarina	Tandil	Municipal Gral. San Martín
Unión	Mar del Plata	(None) ^{1}
Villa Mitre	Bahía Blanca	El Fortín

^{1} Play their home games at Estadio José María Minella.

=== Zone B (Centre) ===
Club	City	Stadium
Alumni	Villa María	Manuel Ocampo
Deportivo Maipú	Maipú	Higinio Sperdutti
Desamparados	San Juan	El Serpentario
Estudiantes	Río Cuarto	Ciudad de Río Cuarto
Juventud Unida Universitario	San Luis	Mario Diez
Racing	Córdoba	Miguel Sancho
Sportivo Belgrano	San Francisco	Oscar Boero
Talleres	Córdoba	La Boutique

=== Zone C (North) ===
Club	City	Stadium
9 de Julio	Rafaela	El Coloso
Central Córdoba	Santiago del Estero	Alfredo Terrara
Central Norte	Salta	Dr. Luis Güemes
Crucero del Norte	Garupá	Andrés Guacurarí
Gimnasia y Esgrima	Concepción del Uruguay	Manuel y Ramón Núñez
Juventud Antoniana	Salta	Fray Honorato Pistoia
Libertad	Sunchales	Hogar de Los Tigres
Unión	Sunchales	La Fortaleza

== First stage ==
=== Zone A ===
Pos	Team	Pld	W	D	L	GF	GA	GD	Pts	Qualification
1	Guillermo Brown	28	15	12	1	53	22	+31	57	Second Stage
2	Unión (MdP)	28	12	9	7	40	30	+10	45	Second Stage
3	Huracán (TA)	28	10	7	11	31	34	−3	37	Second Stage
4	Cipolletti	28	8	10	10	40	43	−3	34	Reválida Stage
5	Douglas Haig	28	7	12	9	30	30	0	33	Reválida Stage
6	Rivadavia (L)	28	9	6	13	23	33	−10	33	Reválida Stage
7	Santamarina	28	7	10	11	23	36	−13	31	Reválida Stage
8	Villa Mitre	28	5	12	11	28	40	−12	27	Reválida Stage

Updated to match(es) played on March 21, 2011. Source: AFA
Rules for classification: 1st points; 2nd goal difference; 3rd goals scored; 4th head-to-head points; 5th head-to-head goal difference; 6th head-to-head goals scored. This does not apply to determining the champion. If two or more teams had been tied in point at the end of the tournament, a playoff would have been held at a neutral venue within 72 hours for the championship

=== Zone B ===
Pos	Team	Pld	W	D	L	GF	GA	GD	Pts	Qualification
1	Talleres (C)	28	15	3	10	49	35	+14	48	Second Stage
2	Sportivo Belgrano	28	15	3	10	42	33	+9	48	Second Stage
3	Desamparados	28	10	11	7	31	22	+9	41	Second Stage
4	Juventud Unida Universitario	28	9	11	8	26	27	−1	38	Reválida Stage
5	Racing (C)	28	8	14	6	26	27	−1	38	Reválida Stage
6	Alumni (VM)	28	5	13	10	33	41	−8	28	Reválida Stage
7	Estudiantes (RC)	28	6	10	12	32	42	−10	28	Reválida Stage
8	Deportivo Maipú	28	5	13	10	23	35	−12	28	Reválida Stage

Updated to match(es) played on March 21, 2011. Source: AFA
Rules for classification: 1st points; 2nd goal difference; 3rd goals scored; 4th head-to-head points; 5th head-to-head goal difference; 6th head-to-head goals scored. This does not apply to determining the champion. If two or more teams had been tied in point at the end of the tournament, a playoff would have been held at a neutral venue within 72 hours for the championship

=== Zone C ===
Pos	Team	Pld	W	D	L	GF	GA	GD	Pts	Qualification
1	Central Norte	28	12	9	7	37	22	+15	45	Second Stage
2	Unión (S)	28	12	9	7	38	25	+13	45	Second Stage
3	Libertad (S)	28	10	11	7	30	27	+3	41	Second Stage
4	Juventud Antoniana	28	11	7	10	30	31	−1	40	Reválida Stage
5	Gimnasia y Esgrima (CdU)	28	11	7	10	30	33	−3	40	Reválida Stage
6	Crucero del Norte	28	10	6	12	25	30	−5	36	Reválida Stage
7	Central Córdoba (SdE)	28	8	9	11	35	46	−11	33	Reválida Stage
8	9 de Julio (R)	28	5	8	15	31	42	−11	23	Reválida Stage

Updated to match(es) played on March 21, 2011. Source: AFA
Rules for classification: 1st points; 2nd goal difference; 3rd goals scored; 4th head-to-head points; 5th head-to-head goal difference; 6th head-to-head goals scored. This does not apply to determining the champion. If two or more teams had been tied in point at the end of the tournament, a playoff would have been held at a neutral venue within 72 hours for the championship

== Second stage ==
Pos	Team	Pld	W	D	L	GF	GA	GD	Pts	Qualification
1	Guillermo Brown (C, P)	8	6	1	1	16	5	+11	19	Primera B Nacional
2	Central Norte	8	5	1	2	14	10	+4	16	Third Stage
3	Libertad (S)	8	3	2	3	13	12	+1	11	Third Stage
4	Unión (MdP)	8	3	2	3	12	11	+1	11	Third Stage
5	Sportivo Belgrano	8	3	2	3	8	10	−2	11	Third Stage
6	Unión (S)	8	2	4	2	12	11	+1	10	Third Stage
7	Desamparados	8	2	3	3	7	10	−3	9	Third Stage
8	Talleres (C)	8	2	2	4	10	13	−3	8	Third Stage
9	Huracán (TA)	8	1	1	6	6	16	−10	4	Third Stage

Updated to match(es) played on May 15, 2011. Source: AFA
Rules for classification: 1st points; 2nd goal difference; 3rd goals scored; 4th head-to-head points; 5th head-to-head goal difference; 6th head-to-head goals scored. This does not apply to determining the champion. If two or more teams had been tied in point at the end of the tournament, a playoff would have been held at a neutral venue within 72 hours for the championship
(C) Champions; (P) Promoted

== Reválida Stage ==
=== Zone A ===
Pos	Team	Pld	W	D	L	GF	GA	GD	Pts	Qualification
1	Douglas Haig	8	5	3	0	12	5	+7	18	Fourth Stage
2	Cipolletti	8	2	4	2	6	5	+1	10	
3	Rivadavia (L)	8	2	3	3	5	8	−3	9	
4	Villa Mitre	8	2	2	4	11	13	−2	8	
5	Santamarina	8	1	4	3	6	9	−3	7	

Updated to match(es) played on April 30, 2011. Source: AFA
Rules for classification: 1st points; 2nd goal difference; 3rd goals scored; 4th head-to-head points; 5th head-to-head goal difference; 6th head-to-head goals scored. This does not apply to determining the champion. If two or more teams had been tied in point at the end of the tournament, a playoff would have been held at a neutral venue within 72 hours for the championship

=== Zone B ===
Pos	Team	Pld	W	D	L	GF	GA	GD	Pts	Qualification
1	Deportivo Maipú	8	6	1	1	13	6	+7	19	Fourth Stage
2	Racing (C)	8	5	1	2	13	8	+5	16	Fourth Stage
3	Estudiantes (RC)	8	2	3	3	10	11	−1	9	
4	Alumni (VM)	8	3	0	5	11	17	−6	9	
5	Juventud Unida Universitario	8	1	1	6	9	14	−5	4	

Updated to match(es) played on April 30, 2011. Source: AFA
Rules for classification: 1st points; 2nd goal difference; 3rd goals scored; 4th head-to-head points; 5th head-to-head goal difference; 6th head-to-head goals scored. This does not apply to determining the champion. If two or more teams had been tied in point at the end of the tournament, a playoff would have been held at a neutral venue within 72 hours for the championship

=== Zone C ===
Pos	Team	Pld	W	D	L	GF	GA	GD	Pts	Qualification
1	Crucero del Norte	8	4	1	3	13	8	+5	13	Fourth Stage
2	Juventud Antoniana	8	4	1	3	11	8	+3	13	
3	Central Córdoba (SdE)	8	3	2	3	14	12	+2	11	
4	Gimnasia y Esgrima (CdU)	8	3	2	3	12	15	−3	11	
5	9 de Julio (R)	8	2	2	4	11	18	−7	8	

Updated to match(es) played on April 30, 2011. Source: AFA
Rules for classification: 1st points; 2nd goal difference; 3rd goals scored; 4th head-to-head points; 5th head-to-head goal difference; 6th head-to-head goals scored. This does not apply to determining the champion. If two or more teams had been tied in point at the end of the tournament, a playoff would have been held at a neutral venue within 72 hours for the championship

== Third stage ==
Team 1	Agg.	Team 2	1st leg	2nd leg
Huracán (TA)	0–3	Central Norte	0–2	0–1
Talleres (C)	2–3	Libertad (S)	0–2	2–1
Desamparados	4–3	Unión (MdP)	3–2	1–1
Unión (S)	1–5	Sportivo Belgrano	0–0	1–5

== Fourth stage ==
Team 1	Agg.	Team 2	1st leg	2nd leg
Racing (C)	3–3	Central Norte	1–2	2–1
Deportivo Maipú	2–4	Libertad (S)	2–0	0–4
Douglas Haig	4–4	Desamparados	3–2	1–2
Crucero del Norte	0–0	Sportivo Belgrano	0–0	0–0

== Fifth stage ==
Team 1	Agg.	Team 2	1st leg	2nd leg
Desamparados	2–0	Central Norte	1–0	1–0
Sportivo Belgrano	3–1	Libertad (S)	0–1	3–0

== Sixth stage ==
Team 1	Agg.	Team 2	1st leg	2nd leg
Desamparados	1–0	Sportivo Belgrano	1–0	0–0

== Promotion/relegation playoff B Nacional-Torneo Argentino A ==
Team 1	Agg.	Team 2	1st leg	2nd leg
San Martín (T)	0–1	Desamparados	0–1	0–0

- Desamparados was promoted to 2011–12 Primera B Nacional by winning the playoff and San Martin (T) was relegated to 2011–12 Torneo Argentino A

== Relegation Matches ==
Pos	Team	Pld	W	D	L	GF	GA	GD	Pts	Qualification or relegation
19	Rivadavia (L)	36	11	9	16	28	41	−13	42	
20	Santamarina	36	8	14	14	29	45	−16	38	
21	Estudiantes (RC)	36	8	13	15	42	53	−11	37	Torneo Argentino B relegation play-off
22	Alumni (VM)	36	8	13	15	44	58	−14	37	Torneo Argentino B relegation play-off
23	Villa Mitre	36	7	14	15	39	53	−14	35	Torneo Argentino B
24	9 de Julio (R)	36	7	10	19	42	60	−18	31	Torneo Argentino B

Team 1	Agg.	Team 2	1st leg	2nd leg
Relegation/promotion playoff 1
Defensores de Belgrano (VR)	3–0	Estudiantes (RC)	1–0	2–0
Relegation/promotion playoff 2
Deportivo Roca	3–5	Alumni (VM)	0–3	3–2

- Defensores de Belgrano (VR) was promoted to 2011–12 Torneo Argentino A by winning the playoff and Estudiantes (RC) was relegated to 2011–12 Torneo Argentino B.
- Alumni (VM) remained in the Torneo Argentino A by winning the playoff.

== See also ==
- 2010–11 in Argentine football
