= Martín García (footballer, born 1998) =

Argentine footballer

Personal information
- Date of birth: 25 August 1998 (age 28)
- Place of birth: General Villegas, Argentina
- Height: 1.77 m (5 ft 10 in)
- Position: Right-back

Team information
- Current team: Almagro

Youth career
- Sportivo Villegas
- Eclipse Villegas
- 2012–2018: Sarmiento

Senior career*
Years	Team	Apps	(Gls)
2018–2024	Sarmiento	43	(0)
2022	→ Estudiantes RC (loan)	20	(0)
2023	→ Quilmes (loan)	20	(0)
2024	Güemes	17	(1)
2025–	Almagro	17	(0)
- * Club domestic league appearances and goals as of 18:30, 28 June 2025 (UTC)

Martín García (born 25 August 1998) is an Argentine professional footballer who plays as a right-back for Almagro.

== Career ==
García began his youth career with Sportivo Villegas, which preceded moves to Eclipse Villegas and, from 2012, Sarmiento. He was an unused substitute for the club's 2018–19 Primera B Nacional opener against Olimpo on 26 August 2018, prior to making his professional debut in the succeeding December during a 1–1 home draw with Gimnasia y Esgrima; featuring for the full duration at the Estadio Eva Perón.

== Career statistics ==
As of 25 March 2019.

Appearances and goals by club, season and competition
Club	Season	League			Cup		Continental		Other		Total	
Club	Season	Division	Apps	Goals	Apps	Goals	Apps	Goals	Apps	Goals	Apps	Goals
Sarmiento	2018–19	Primera B Nacional	4	0	0	0	—		0	0	4	0
Career total			4	0	0	0	—		0	0	4	0
