= Gabriel Sanabria =

Argentine footballer

Personal information
- Full name: Gabriel Alejandro Sanabria
- Date of birth: 2 July 1992 (age 34)
- Place of birth: Lanús, Argentina
- Height: 1.78 m (5 ft 10 in)
- Position: Attacking midfielder

Team information
- Current team: Tristán Suárez

Senior career*
Years	Team	Apps	(Gls)
2010–2013	Atlanta	30	(3)
2013–2014	Gutiérrez	0	(0)
2014–2016	Villa Dálmine	37	(3)
2016–2017	Arsenal de Sarandí	22	(2)
2017–2018	Los Andes	7	(0)
2018–2019	Sarmiento	7	(1)
2019	Levadiakos	6	(1)
2020–	Tristán Suárez	4	(2)
- * Club domestic league appearances and goals as of 10:50, 30 August 2020 (UTC)

Gabriel Alejandro Sanabria (born 2 July 1992) is an Argentine professional footballer who plays as an attacking midfielder for Tristán Suárez.

== Career ==
Sanabria started with Primera B Metropolitana side Atlanta during 2010–11, a season that Atlanta finished with promotion into the 2011–12 Primera B Nacional but were relegated back to Primera B Metropolitana at the first time of asking. During this time, Sanabria made thirty appearances for the club and scored three goals. Sanabria then departed Atlanta to join Torneo Argentino B club Gutiérrez before going onto join Villa Dálmine of Primera B Metropolitana. Across two seasons with Villa Dálmine, he scored three goals in thirty-seven games in the third tier. In January 2016, Sanabria joined Primera División club Arsenal de Sarandí.

He made his top-flight Argentine debut on 12 February against Banfield. In July 2017, Sanabria was released by Arsenal. On 5 August, Sanabria joined second-tier team Los Andes on a free transfer. His Los Andes debut came on 15 September in a goalless draw against Deportivo Morón. On 26 November, Sanabria made his 100th career appearance versus Estudiantes. In January 2018, Sanabria signed for fellow Primera B Nacional side Sarmiento. He scored on his first appearance, netting the club's fourth goal in an away win against Flandria. In July 2019, Sanabria headed to Greece with Levadiakos of Super League 2.

Sanabria's first goal for Levadiakos came during his first match, which was a 3–2 loss away to Platanias on 29 September. His contract was terminated in December. Sanabria subsequently returned to Argentina with Tristán Suárez. He made his debut on 1 February 2020 against UAI Urquiza, prior to scoring twice in his next appearance versus Almirante Brown.

== Career statistics ==
As of 30 August 2020.

Club statistics
Club	Season	League			Cup		League Cup		Continental		Other		Total	
Club	Season	Division	Apps	Goals	Apps	Goals	Apps	Goals	Apps	Goals	Apps	Goals	Apps	Goals
Atlanta	2010–11	Primera B Metropolitana	0	0	0	0	—		—		0	0	0	0
Atlanta	2011–12	Primera B Nacional	7	0	1	0	—		—		0	0	8	0
Atlanta	2012–13	Primera B Metropolitana	23	3	0	0	—		—		0	0	23	3
Atlanta	Total		30	3	1	0	—		—		0	0	31	3
Gutiérrez	2013–14	Torneo Argentino B	0	0	0	0	—		—		0	0	0	0
Villa Dálmine	2014	Primera B Metropolitana	16	1	0	0	—		—		0	0	16	1
Villa Dálmine	2015	Primera B Nacional	21	2	0	0	—		—		0	0	21	2
Villa Dálmine	Total		37	3	0	0	—		—		0	0	37	3
Arsenal de Sarandí	2016	Primera División	12	2	1	0	—		—		0	0	13	2
Arsenal de Sarandí	2016–17	Primera División	10	0	2	0	—		0	0	0	0	12	0
Arsenal de Sarandí	Total		22	2	3	0	—		0	0	0	0	25	2
Los Andes	2017–18	Primera B Nacional	7	0	0	0	—		—		0	0	7	0
Sarmiento	2017–18	Primera B Nacional	7	1	0	0	—		—		0	0	7	1
Sarmiento	2018–19	Primera B Nacional	12	0	1	0	—		—		0	0	13	0
Sarmiento	Total		19	1	1	0	—		—		0	0	20	1
Levadiakos	2019–20	Super League 2	6	1	0	0	—		—		0	0	6	1
Tristán Suárez	2019–20	Primera B Metropolitana	4	2	0	0	—		—		0	0	4	2
Career total			125	12	5	0	—		0	0	0	0	130	12
