= Santiago Rosa =

Argentine footballer (born 1997)

Personal information
- Date of birth: 15 August 1997 (age 29)
- Place of birth: Junín, Argentina
- Height: 1.84 m (6 ft 0 in)
- Position: Forward

Team information
- Current team: Peña Deportiva

Youth career
- 2007–2017: Sarmiento

Senior career*
Years	Team	Apps	(Gls)
2017–2021	Sarmiento	10	(1)
2019–2020	→ Peña Deportiva B (loan)	6	(1)
2021	→ Ciudad de Lucena (loan)	11	(0)
2021–2022	Gimnasia Jujuy	1	(0)
2022–2023	Montilla	0	(0)
2023	Sant Jordi	11	(7)
2023–2024	Lanzarote	29	(5)
2024	Atlético Villegas		
2025	Portmany	15	(7)
2025–	Peña Deportiva	6	(2)
- * Club domestic league appearances and goals as of 9 November 2025

Santiago Rosa (born 15 August 1997) is an Argentine professional footballer who plays as a forward for Spanish Tercera Federación club Peña Deportiva.

== Career ==
Rosa's career started with Sarmiento of the Primera División, after joining their academy in 2007. Having made substitute appearances against Defensa y Justicia and Vélez Sarsfield, Rosa made his starting debut during a 2–3 win away to Atlético de Rafaela; though they ended the campaign with relegation. No appearances followed in the 2017–18 Primera B Nacional, but he returned to the first-team set-up under Iván Delfino in 2018–19; featuring five times in the first half of the season, during which period he also netted his first senior goal versus Platense.

In July 2019, Rosa was loaned to Spain with Peña Deportiva B; he was initially signed for their senior team, though later wasn't registered. He scored once, versus AE Santa Gertrudis, in six appearances in Regional Preferente Ibiza/Formentera. Rosa headed back to Sarmiento in early 2020. In January 2021, Rosa completed a loan return to Spanish football with Tercera División side Ciudad de Lucena; the move had been delayed for months due to bureaucratic issues. He debuted in a 1–0 defeat away to Sevilla C on 17 January.

At the end of July 2021, Rosa joined Gimnasia Jujuy.

== Career statistics ==
As of 14 February 2021.

Appearances and goals by club, season and competition
Club	Season	League			Cup		League Cup		Continental		Other		Total	
Club	Season	Division	Apps	Goals	Apps	Goals	Apps	Goals	Apps	Goals	Apps	Goals	Apps	Goals
Sarmiento	2016–17	Primera División	3	0	0	0	—		—		0	0	3	0
Sarmiento	2017–18	Primera B Nacional	0	0	0	0	—		—		0	0	0	0
Sarmiento	2018–19	Primera B Nacional	7	1	1	0	—		—		0	0	8	1
Sarmiento	2019–20	Primera B Nacional	0	0	0	0	—		—		0	0	0	1
Sarmiento	Total		10	1	1	0	—		—		0	0	11	1
Peña Deportiva B (loan)	2019–20	Regional Ibiza/Formentera	6	1	0	0	—		—		0	0	6	1
Ciudad de Lucena (loan)	2020–21	Tercera División	3	0	0	0	0	0	—		0	0	3	0
Career total			19	2	1	0	0	0	—		0	0	20	2
