= Sergio Quiroga =

Argentine footballer (born 1994)

Personal information
- Full name: Sergio Alejandro Quiroga Gabutti
- Date of birth: 7 June 1994 (age 32)
- Place of birth: Charata, Argentina
- Height: 1.62 m (5 ft 4 in)
- Position: Forward

Team information
- Current team: Central Norte

Youth career
- Argentinos Juniors

Senior career*
Years	Team	Apps	(Gls)
2015–2016	Argentinos Juniors	0	(0)
2015	→ Brown (loan)	7	(1)
2016	→ San Miguel (loan)		
2016–2026	Sarmiento	172	(11)
2025	→ Ferro Carril Oeste (loan)	21	(1)
2026	Alianza Atlético	0	(0)
2026–	Central Norte	11	(0)
- * Club domestic league appearances and goals as of 16:32, 5 October 2026 (UTC)

Sergio Alejandro Quiroga Gabutti (born 7 June 1994) is an Argentine professional footballer who plays as a forward for Central Norte.

== Career ==
Quiroga began his career in the system of Argentinos Juniors. On 2 July 2015, Quiroga joined Primera B Metropolitana side Brown on loan. He made his professional bow during a fixture away to Deportivo Español, which preceded his first goal arriving two matches later against Deportivo Riestra on 23 September; which was scored via a strike from inside his own half, into an empty net after their opponents goalkeeper went up for a corner. He returned to his parent club in December, having made seven appearances for the Adrogué team. San Miguel of Primera C Metropolitana signed Quiroga in January 2016, on a six-month loan.

In August 2016, Quiroga completed a permanent move to Sarmiento. He featured twice as the club were relegated to Primera B Nacional in 2016–17. Quiroga scored on his fourteenth tier two game for Sarmiento, coming off the bench for Guillermo Farré before netting their second in a 0–2 victory over Almagro on 28 September 2018.

== Career statistics ==
As of 27 March 2019.

Appearances and goals by club, season and competition
Club	Season	League			Cup		Continental		Other		Total	
Club	Season	Division	Apps	Goals	Apps	Goals	Apps	Goals	Apps	Goals	Apps	Goals
Argentinos Juniors	2015	Primera División	0	0	0	0	—		0	0	0	0
Argentinos Juniors	2016	Primera División	0	0	0	0	—		0	0	0	0
Argentinos Juniors	Total		0	0	0	0	—		0	0	0	0
Brown (loan)	2015	Primera B Metropolitana	7	1	0	0	—		0	0	7	1
Sarmiento	2016–17	Primera División	2	0	0	0	—		0	0	2	0
Sarmiento	2017–18	Primera B Nacional	2	0	1	0	—		5 (Note: Appearance(s) in the Primera B Nacional play-offs)	0	8	0
Sarmiento	2018–19	Primera B Nacional	18	1	0	0	—		0	0	18	1
Sarmiento	Total		22	1	1	0	—		5	0	28	1
Career total			29	2	1	0	—		5	0	35	2

== Honours ==
Brown

- Primera B Metropolitana: 2015
