= Claudio Pombo =

Argentine footballer

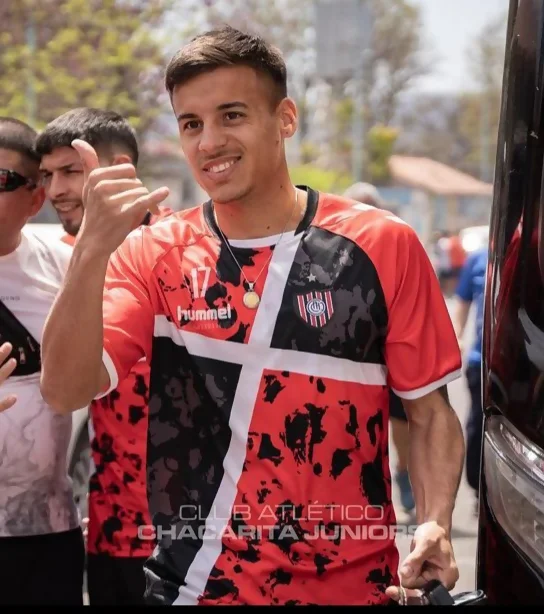

Personal information
- Full name: Claudio Martín Pombo
- Date of birth: 28 April 1994 (age 32)
- Place of birth: Gualeguaychú, Argentina
- Height: 1.71 m (5 ft 7 in)
- Position: Midfielder

Team information
- Current team: Gimnasia Jujuy

Youth career
- River Plate

Senior career*
Years	Team	Apps	(Gls)
2013–2015	Juventud Unida	34	(0)
2016	Huracán	12	(6)
2016–2018	Juventud Unida	38	(5)
2018–2019	Atlético Tucumán	1	(0)
2019–2025	Sarmiento	34	(4)
2022	→ Instituto (loan)	27	(0)
2023	→ San Martín (T) (loan)	11	(0)
2023–2024	→ Chacarita Juniors (loan)	48	(6)
2025–2026	Temperley	24	(2)
2026–	Gimnasia Jujuy	6	(0)
- * Club domestic league appearances and goals as of 17:17, 28 April 2026 (UTC)

Claudio Martín Pombo (born 28 April 1994) is an Argentine professional footballer who plays as a midfielder for Gimnasia Jujuy.

== Career ==
Pombo started out in River Plate's youth. He completed a move to Juventud Unida in 2013, appearing for the club in the 2013–14 Torneo Argentino A. The club were promoted in his second campaign to Primera B Nacional, by which point he had featured fourteen times for them. He remained for one further season, which preceded his departure in 2016 when he signed for Huracán of Torneo Federal B. After six goals in twelve fixtures for Huracán, Pombo left and subsequently had trials with Independiente and Platense; either side of one with Salvadoran Primera División side Águila. All three sides decided against signing Pombo.

Juventud Unida resigned Pombo ahead of the 2016–17 Primera B Nacional campaign. Two years following, after five goals in thirty-nine appearances in all competitions, Pombo made a move to Atlético Tucumán of the Argentine Primera División.

== Career statistics ==
As of 10 October 2018.

Club statistics
Club	Season	League			Cup (Note: Includes the Copa Argentina and Copa El Salvador)		League Cup		Continental (Note: Includes the Copa Libertadores)		Other		Total	
Club	Season	Division	Apps	Goals	Apps	Goals	Apps	Goals	Apps	Goals	Apps	Goals	Apps	Goals
Juventud Unida	2013–14	Torneo Argentino A	2	0	1	0	—		—		3 (Note: Three appearances in the 2013–14 Torneo Argentino A play-offs)	0	6	0
Juventud Unida	2014	Torneo Federal A	8	0	0	0	—		—		0	0	8	0
Juventud Unida	2015	Primera B Nacional	24	0	0	0	—		—		0	0	24	0
Juventud Unida	Total		34	0	1	0	—		—		3	0	38	0
Huracán	2016	Torneo Federal B	12	6	0	0	—		—		0	0	12	6
Juventud Unida	2016–17	Primera B Nacional	16	1	0	0	—		—		0	0	16	1
Juventud Unida	2017–18	Primera B Nacional	22	4	1	0	—		—		0	0	23	4
Juventud Unida	Total		38	5	1	0	—		—		0	0	39	5
Atlético Tucumán	2018–19	Argentine Primera División	0	0	0	0	—		0	0	0	0	0	0
Career total			84	11	2	0	—		0	0	3	0	89	11
