= María Caviglia =

Argentine politician (1895–1985)

National Deputy
- In office 1952–1955
- Constituency: Entre Rios

Personal details
- Born: 14 July 1895; Paraná, Argentina
- Died: 2 August 1985 (aged 90); Paraná, Argentina

María Carmen Caviglia de Boeykens (14 July 1895 – 2 August 1985) was an Argentine politician. She was elected to the Chamber of Deputies in 1951 as one of the first group of female parliamentarians in Argentina.

== Biography ==
Caviglia was born in Paraná in 1895 into a family of Italian immigrants. She married Bendictus Alfonso Boykens at the age of 17 and went on to have five children.

She became involved in politics at the age of 23 when she attended a women's rights conference organised by Alicia Moreau de Justo, and a few years later met politician Hipólito Yrigoyen, when he became godfather to one of her nephews. She organised a women's suffrage centre in Paraná, which attracted the attention of Eva Perón. She was also involved in achieving a doubling of pay for teachers in poor rural areas and established centres for preventing Chagas disease.

In the 1951 legislative elections she was a Peronist Party candidate in Entre Rios and was one of the 26 women elected to the Chamber of Deputies. She remained in office until 1955, when her term was cut short by the Revolución Libertadora, during which she was imprisoned.

She died in Paraná in 1985 at the age of 90.
