= Gimnasia y Esgrima de Santa Fe =

Argentine football club

Gimnasia y Esgrima
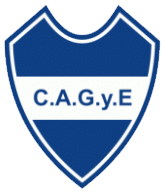
- Full name: Club Atlético Gimnasia y Esgrima
- Founded: 23 August 1914; 111 years ago
- Ground: El Gigante de La Ciudadela; Santa Fe city, Argentina
- Capacity: ?
- League: Torneo Argentino B
- 2007–08: 8th (of 8 teams) Zone D (Lost playoff, relegated to Argentino C)
Home colours	Away colours

Club Atlético Gimnasia y Esgrima (usually known as Gimnasia de Santa Fe) is an Argentine football club. Their home town is the neighbourhood of Ciudadela, in Santa Fe city, Santa Fe Province of Argentina. They currently play in regionalised 5th level of Argentine football Torneo Argentino C.

Gimnasia y Esgrima became the first champion in professional football in Argentina in 1931. Gimnasia won the Santa Fe city professional league before Boca Juniors won the AFA title in Buenos Aires and Newell's Old Boys won the Rosario league title that same year.

== See also ==
- List of football clubs in Argentina
- Argentine football league system
