= Fernando Núñez (footballer, born 1995) =

Argentinian association football player

Personal information
- Full name: Fernando Andrés Núñez
- Date of birth: 22 July 1995 (age 31)
- Place of birth: Villa Nueva, Argentina
- Height: 1.81 m (5 ft 11 1/2 in)
- Position: Forward

Team information
- Current team: Argentino MM

Youth career
- 2009–2013: Club Leonardo Murialdo
- 2013–2017: Godoy Cruz

Senior career*
Years	Team	Apps	(Gls)
2017–2020	Godoy Cruz	9	(0)
2019–2020	→ Sarmiento (loan)	11	(2)
2020–2021	Huracán LH	22	(1)
2022–	Argentino MM	3	(0)
- * Club domestic league appearances and goals as of 22:10, 7 May 2022 (UTC)

Fernando Andrés Núñez (born 22 July 1995) is an Argentine professional footballer who plays as a forward for Argentino Monte Maíz.

== Career ==
Núñez started his youth career with Club Leonardo Murialdo, before being signed by Godoy Cruz. He was promoted into the first-team of Argentine Primera División side Godoy Cruz in 2017. He featured four times throughout the 2016–17 league season, but his professional debut arrived in the Copa Libertadores during May 2017 in a home draw against Libertad. He played once more in the Copa Libertadores, versus Atlético Mineiro on 16 May, prior to making his league bow in a win over Vélez Sarsfield on 21 May. Núñez spent 2019–20 on loan with Sarmiento; scoring twice, versus Chacarita Juniors and All Boys, in eleven games.

In October 2020, Núñez moved to Tornero Argentino A club Huracán LH. In March 2022, he joined fellow league club Argentino Monte Maíz.

== Career statistics ==
As of 26 August 2020.

Club statistics
Club	Season	League			Cup		League Cup		Continental		Other		Total	
Club	Season	Division	Apps	Goals	Apps	Goals	Apps	Goals	Apps	Goals	Apps	Goals	Apps	Goals
Godoy Cruz	2016–17	Primera División	4	0	0	0	—		2 (Note: Appearance(s) in the Copa Libertadores)	0	0	0	6	0
Godoy Cruz	2017–18	Primera División	0	0	0	0	—		0	0	0	0	0	0
Godoy Cruz	2018–19	Primera División	5	0	0	0	0	0	0	0	0	0	5	0
Godoy Cruz	2019–20	Primera División	0	0	0	0	0	0	—		0	0	0	0
Godoy Cruz	Total		9	0	0	0	0	0	2	0	0	0	11	0
Sarmiento (loan)	2019–20	Primera B Nacional	11	2	0	0	—		—		0	0	11	2
Career total			20	2	0	0	0	0	2	0	0	0	22	2
