= 2014 Primera B Nacional =

29th season of the second-tier football league in Argentina

Primera B Nacional
- Season: 2014
- Promoted: Aldosivi; Argentinos Juniors; Colón; Crucero del Norte; Huracán; Nueva Chicago; San Martín (SJ); Sarmiento; Temperley; Unión
- Relegated: No relegation this season
- Matches played: 220
- Goals scored: 440 (2 per match)
- Top goalscorer: Ramón Abila; Nicolas Mazzola (9 goals)
- Biggest home win: Huracán 4-0 Independiente (December 8)
- Biggest away win: Colón 0-4 San Martín (SJ) (September 19); Boca Unidos 0–4 Argentinos Juniors (October 30)
- Highest scoring: Unión 2-3 Atlético Tucumán (August 17); Colón 4-1 Guaraní Antonio Franco (September 3); Atlético Tucumán 4–1 Santamarina (December 8)
- All statistics correct as of December 8, 2014.

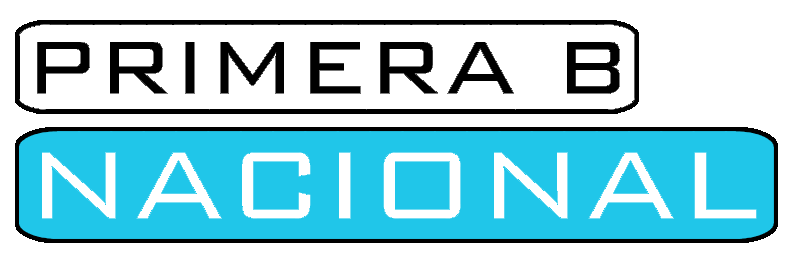
Primera B Nacional logo.

The 2014 Argentine Primera B Nacional was the 29th season of the professional Argentine second division. A total of 22 teams competed. For this season, AFA decided to change the structure in the Argentine football league system, and because of this 10 teams were promoted to Primera División, with no relegations.

== Club information ==
Club	City	Stadium
Aldosivi	Mar del Plata	José María Minella
All Boys	Floresta	Islas Malvinas
Argentinos Juniors	Buenos Aires	Diego Armando Maradona
Atlético Tucumán	Tucumán	Monumental José Fierro
Boca Unidos	Corrientes	José Antonio Romero Feris
Colón	Santa Fe	Brigadier General Estanislao López
Crucero del Norte	Garupá	Comandante Andrés Guacurarí
Douglas Haig	Pergamino	Miguel Morales
Ferro Carril Oeste	Buenos Aires	Arquitecto Ricardo Etcheverry
Gimnasia y Esgrima	Jujuy	23 de Agosto
Guaraní Antonio Franco	Posadas	Clemente Fernandez de Oliveira
Huracán	Buenos Aires	Tomás Adolfo Ducó
Independiente Rivadavia	Mendoza	Bautista Gargantini
Instituto	Córdoba	Presidente Perón
Nueva Chicago	Mataderos	Nueva Chicago
Patronato	Paraná	Presbítero Bartolomé Grella
San Martín	San Juan	Ingeniero Hilario Sánchez
Santamarina	Tandil	Municipal Gral. San Martín
Sarmiento	Junín	Eva Perón
Sportivo Belgrano	San Francisco	Oscar Boero
Temperley	Temperley	Alfredo Beranger
Unión	Santa Fe	15 de Abril

== Standings ==
=== Zone A ===
Pos	Team	Pld	W	D	L	GF	GA	GD	Pts	Promotion
1	Colón	20	8	7	5	25	15	+10	31	Argentine Primera División
2	San Martín (SJ)	20	9	4	7	21	12	+9	31	Argentine Primera División
3	Argentinos Juniors	20	9	4	7	17	14	+3	31	Argentine Primera División
4	Nueva Chicago	20	7	9	4	20	16	+4	30	Zone A triangular
5	Aldosivi	20	8	6	6	21	18	+3	30	Zone A triangular
6	Gimnasia y Esgrima (J)	20	7	9	4	19	16	+3	30	Zone A triangular
7	Boca Unidos	20	7	6	7	18	20	−2	27	
8	Instituto	20	6	7	7	23	27	−4	25	
9	Douglas Haig	20	6	7	7	16	21	−5	25	
10	Guaraní Antonio Franco	20	4	6	10	16	27	−11	18	
11	Ferro Carril Oeste	20	3	7	10	11	21	−10	16	

Source: AFA
Rules for classification: 1st points; 2nd play-off (only for deciding promotion); 3rd goal difference; 4th goals scored; 5th head-to-head points; 6th head-to-head goal difference; 7th head-to-head goals scored.

==== Results ====
Home \ Away	ALD	ARJ	BOU	COL	DOU	FCO	GJU	GAF	INS	NCH	SMA
Aldosivi		2–0	2–1	2–1	1–1	2–1	2–0	2–0	2–0	1–1	1–2
Argentinos Juniors	1–0		1–0	0–2	1–1	0–1	0–2	2–0	0–0	1–2	1–0
Boca Unidos	1–0	0–4		0–0	0–0	2–0	2–0	1–0	1–2	0–0	1–0
Colón	2–0	0–2	3–0		3–1	1–0	0–0	4–1	0–0	3–0	0–4
Douglas Haig	0–0	0–1	2–1	1–0		2–0	0–1	1–1	2–1	1–2	1–0
Ferro Carril Oeste	0–1	0–1	0–1	1–1	0–0		0–1	3–0	1–3	1–0	0–0
Gimnasia y Esgrima (J)	1–1	1–0	2–2	1–1	3–0	0–0		2–1	1–2	1–1	1–0
Guaraní Antonio Franco	0–0	0–0	2–1	2–1	3–1	1–1	0–0		1–2	0–1	2–0
Instituto	3–2	1–1	1–3	0–3	0–1	1–1	2–2	1–1		1–2	2–0
Nueva Chicago	3–0	0–1	0–0	0–0	1–1	1–1	0–0	3–1	1–1		2–0
San Martín (SJ)	0–0	2–0	1–1	0–0	2–0	3–0	2–0	1–0	2–0	2–0	

Source: AFA
Legend: Blue = home team win; Yellow = draw; Red = away team win.

==== Zone A triangular ====
Three tied teams from Zone A will play in a triangular for two places in the Argentine Primera División. It will be played 11–19 December. Although a home and an away team is named for each match, the three matches will be played in neutral stadiums.

Pos	Team	Pld	W	D	L	GF	GA	GD	Pts	Promotion
1	Nueva Chicago	2	1	1	0	1	0	+1	4	Argentine Primera División
2	Aldosivi	2	1	1	0	1	0	+1	4	Argentine Primera División
3	Gimnasia y Esgrima (J)	2	0	0	2	0	2	−2	0	

Source: AFA
Rules for classification: 1st points; 2nd goal difference; 3rd results between teams from the regular season (Nueva Chicago=6; Aldosivi=5; Gimnasia y Esgrima=3)

==== Results of triangular ====
Home \ Away	ALD	GJU	NCH
Aldosivi			
Gimnasia y Esgrima (J)	0–1		
Nueva Chicago	0–0	1–0	

Updated to match(es) played on 19 December 2014. Source: AFA
Legend: Blue = home team win; Yellow = draw; Red = away team win.

=== Zone B ===
Pos	Team	Pld	W	D	L	GF	GA	GD	Pts	Promotion
1	Unión	20	12	5	3	33	16	+17	41	Argentine Primera División
2	Crucero del Norte	20	10	3	7	22	14	+8	33	Argentine Primera División
3	Temperley	20	10	2	8	22	26	−4	32	Argentine Primera División
4	Sarmiento	20	7	9	4	22	17	+5	30	Argentine Primera División
5	Atlético Tucumán	20	8	5	7	27	21	+6	29	Zone B play–off
6	Huracán	20	8	5	7	26	21	+5	29	Zone B play–off
7	Santamarina	20	6	6	8	21	27	−6	24	
8	Patronato	20	5	7	8	15	18	−3	22	
9	Independiente Rivadavia	20	6	4	10	16	22	−6	22	
10	All Boys	20	5	7	8	11	20	−9	22	
11	Sportivo Belgrano	20	4	5	11	18	31	−13	17	

Source: AFA
Rules for classification: 1st points; 2nd play-off (only for deciding promotion); 3rd goal difference; 4th goals scored; 5th head-to-head points; 6th head-to-head goal difference; 7th head-to-head goals scored.

==== Results ====
Home \ Away	ALL	ATU	CRU	HUR	IRV	PAT	SAN	SAR	SPB	TEM	UNI
All Boys		1–0	1–0	0–3	0–1	1–1	0–0	1–0	1–1	0–0	2–2
Atlético Tucumán	2–0		1–0	1–2	1–0	0–0	4–1	1–1	3–1	3–1	0–1
Crucero del Norte	1–0	1–1		0–1	2–0	3–0	2–1	0–0	1–0	3–0	0–1
Huracán	0–1	2–1	0–2		4–0	0–1	3–0	2–2	0–3	3–0	1–2
Independiente Rivadavia	0–0	0–0	2–1	1–1		2–0	1–2	0–2	3–1	3–1	0–1
Patronato	0–0	1–1	0–1	2–0	1–0		1–2	3–0	2–0	0–1	1–3
Santamarina	3–1	1–0	0–1	1–1	0–2	0–0		0–2	0–0	3–1	2–2
Sarmiento	0–1	3–2	1–1	0–0	0–0	1–0	2–2		2–0	3–0	2–1
Sportivo Belgrano	1–0	1–2	0–2	1–1	2–1	2–2	0–3	1–1		0–3	3–1
Temperley	3–1	2–1	2–1	0–2	1–0	1–0	2–0	2–0	1–0		1–1
Unión	2–0	2–3	3–0	3–1	2–0	0–0	2–0	0–0	2–1	2–0	

Source: AFA
Legend: Blue = home team win; Yellow = draw; Red = away team win.

==== Zone B - 5th. promotion play–off ====
Two tied teams from Zone B competed in a play-off match for a place in the Argentine Primera División.

Promotion playoff
14 December 2014
17:15 ART

Huracán	4–1 (a.e.t.)	Atlético Tucumán
Mancinelli 67'; Romero 104'; Ábila 113'; Torassa 117' (pen.)	Report	Menéndez 58'

Estadio Malvinas Argentinas, Mendoza
Referee: Germán Delfino

Team details

Huracán
Atlético Tucumán

GK	1	Marcos Díaz
DF	2	Federico Mancinelli
DF	4	Rodrigo Erramuspe
DF	6	Eduardo Domínguez
DF	3	Guillermo Sotelo
MF	5	Federico Vismara	Booked
MF	8	Lucas Villarruel		(substituted off) a'
MF	11	Patricio Toranzo		(substituted off) b'
MF	10	Gonzalo Martínez
FW	7	Cristian Espinoza		(substituted off) c'
FW	9	Ramón Ábila
Substitutions:
MF	17	Alejandro Romero		(substituted in) a'
MF	14	Ezequiel Gallegos		(substituted in) b'
FW	15	Agustín Torassa		(substituted in) c'
Manager:
(Argentina) Néstor Apuzzo

GK	1	Lucas Calviño	Sent off (straight red)
DF	4	Eduardo Casais		(substituted off) a'
DF	2	Bruno Bianchi
DF	6	Franco Sbuttoni
DF	3	Nicolás Romat
MF	10	Jonathan Gómez		(substituted off) b'
MF	5	Pablo Garnier	Booked
MF	8	Francisco Grahl
MF	9	Guillermo Acosta		(substituted off) c'
FW	11	Cristian Menéndez
FW	7	Pulga Rodríguez
Substitutions:
FW	17	Juan Imbert		(substituted in) a'
MF	16	Iván Etevenaux		(substituted in) b' (yellow card)
FW	14	Leandro Díaz		(substituted in) c' (yellow card) (red card)
Manager:
(Argentina) Juan Manuel Azconzábal

Note: Huracán was the 5th. team of Zone B to promote to Primera División.

== Relegation ==
This season there were no relegations because of the new format. The points obtained were added for the next season.

== Season statistics ==
=== Top scorers ===
Updated for games played 8 December 2014

Rank	Player	Club	Goals
1	(Argentina) Nicolas Mazzola	Instituto	9
1	(Argentina) Ramón Ábila	Huracán	9
3	(Argentina) Enrique Triverio	Unión	8
3	(Argentina) Claudio Guerra	Unión	8
5	(Argentina) Héctor Cuevas	Sarmiento	7
5	(Argentina) Juan Ignacio Dinenno	Temperley	7
7	(Argentina) César Carranza	Aldosivi	6
7	(Argentina) Cristian Menéndez	Tucumán	6
7	(Argentina) Lucas Alario	Colón	6
7	(Argentina) Luis Miguel Rodríguez	Tucumán	6

== See also ==
- 2014–15 in Argentine football
- 2014 Argentine Primera División
