= Federico Vismara =

Argentine footballer

Personal information
- Full name: Federico Vismara
- Date of birth: 9 May 1983 (age 43)
- Place of birth: Carcarañá, Argentina
- Height: 1.85 m (6 ft 1 in)
- Position: Midfielder

Youth career
- –2002: Estudiantes

Senior career*
Years	Team	Apps	(Gls)
2002–2004	Estudiantes	9	(0)
2004–2006	El Porvenir	55	(1)
2006–2008	Aldosivi	58	(0)
2008–2010	Chacarita Juniors	56	(2)
2010	Ascoli	0	(0)
2011–2012	Rosario Central	19	(1)
2012–2014	Instituto	64	(0)
2014–2015	Huracán	42	(0)
2016–2017	Racing Club	11	(0)
2018–2019	Chacarita Juniors	33	(1)
2019–2022	Sarmiento	54	(1)
- * Club domestic league appearances and goals

Federico Vismara (born 9 May 1983) is a retired Argentine professional footballer who last played as a midfielder for Sarmiento.

== Career ==
Vismara started in the system of Estudiantes in 2002. He remained with the Argentine Primera División team for two years, making a total of nine appearances in the process. Primera B Nacional side El Porvenir signed Vismara in 2004, with the midfielder subsequently appearing fifty-five times and scoring once in two seasons with them. A move to Aldosivi followed in 2006, prior to Vismara agreeing to sign for fellow second tier outfit Chacarita Juniors. He scored one goal in thirty-five appearances during 2008–09 as they won promotion to the Primera División. His first top-flight goal arrived in April 2010 against Lanús as the club were relegated.

On 30 June 2010, Vismara completed a move to Serie B side Ascoli. However, he departed in the following December after not appearing competitively for the Italian club; though was an unused substitute in August for a Coppa Italia tie with Lumezzane and for league matches with Grosseto and Modena. Vismara returned to his homeland in January 2011 after joining Rosario Central. Having spent two campaigns with them, Vismara left to join Instituto ahead of the 2012–13 Primera B Nacional season. He received twenty-two yellow cards and four red cards in 2012–13 and 2013–14. In total, he featured sixty-eight times for Instituto over that period.

July 2014 saw Huracán become Vismara's eighth senior club. He was selected seventeen times in continental competition throughout his second campaign, 2015, which included nine appearances in the Copa Sudamericana as Huracán finished as runners-up to Colombia's Santa Fe. He won the Copa Argentina and Supercopa Argentina whilst with Huracán. Vismara switched them for Racing Club in January 2016. Despite participating in fifteen games during 2016, the midfielder failed to make an appearance in either 2016–17 or 2017–18. Midway through the latter, Vismara rejoined Chacarita Juniors of Primera B Nacional.

In July 2019, Vismara joined Sarmiento. Although he had a contract until the end of 2022, Vismara confirmed on 18 May 2022 that he had retired from football.

== Career statistics ==
As of 9 December 2018.

Club statistics
Club	Season	League			Cup (Note: Includes the Copa Argentina and Coppa Italia)		League Cup		Continental (Note: Includes the Copa Libertadores and Copa Sudamericana)		Other		Total	
Club	Season	Division	Apps	Goals	Apps	Goals	Apps	Goals	Apps	Goals	Apps	Goals	Apps	Goals
Chacarita Juniors	2008–09	Primera B Nacional	35	1	0	0	—		—		0	0	35	1
Chacarita Juniors	2009–10	Primera División	21	1	0	0	—		—		0	0	21	1
Chacarita Juniors	Total		56	2	0	0	—		—		0	0	56	2
Ascoli	2010–11	Serie B	0	0	0	0	—		—		0	0	0	0
Rosario Central	2010–11	Primera B Nacional	11	1	0	0	—		—		0	0	11	1
Rosario Central	2011–12	Primera B Nacional	8	0	3	0	—		—		0	0	11	0
Rosario Central	Total		19	1	3	0	—		—		0	0	22	1
Instituto	2012–13	Primera B Nacional	30	0	2	0	—		—		0	0	32	0
Instituto	2013–14	Primera B Nacional	34	0	2	0	—		—		0	0	36	0
Instituto	Total		64	0	4	0	—		—		0	0	68	0
Huracán	2014	Primera B Nacional	19	0	5	0	—		—		1 (Note: One appearance in the 2014 Primera B Nacional play-offs)	0	25	0
Huracán	2015	Primera División	23	0	1	0	—		17 (Note: Eight appearances in the 2015 Copa Libertadores, nine appearances in 2015 Copa Sudamericana)	0	1 (Note: One appearance in the 2014 Supercopa Argentina)	0	42	0
Huracán	Total		42	0	6	0	—		17	0	2	0	67	0
Racing Club	2016	Primera División	11	0	0	0	—		4 (Note: Four appearances in the 2016 Copa Libertadores)	0	0	0	15	0
Racing Club	2016–17	Primera División	0	0	0	0	—		0	0	0	0	0	0
Racing Club	2017–18	Primera División	0	0	0	0	—		0	0	0	0	0	0
Racing Club	Total		11	0	0	0	—		4	0	0	0	15	0
Chacarita Juniors	2017–18	Primera División	13	0	1	0	—		—		0	0	14	0
Chacarita Juniors	2018–19	Primera B Nacional	12	1	0	0	—		—		0	0	12	1
Chacarita Juniors	Total		25	1	1	0	—		—		0	0	26	1
Career total			217	4	14	0	—		21	0	2	0	254	4

== Honours ==
Huracán

- Copa Argentina: 2013–14
- Supercopa Argentina: 2014
