= Aconquija =

Coordinates: 27°29′55″S 66°01′26″W

- Municipality and town
- Interactive map of Aconquija
- Country: Argentina
- Province: Catamarca Province
- Time zone: UTC−3 (ART)

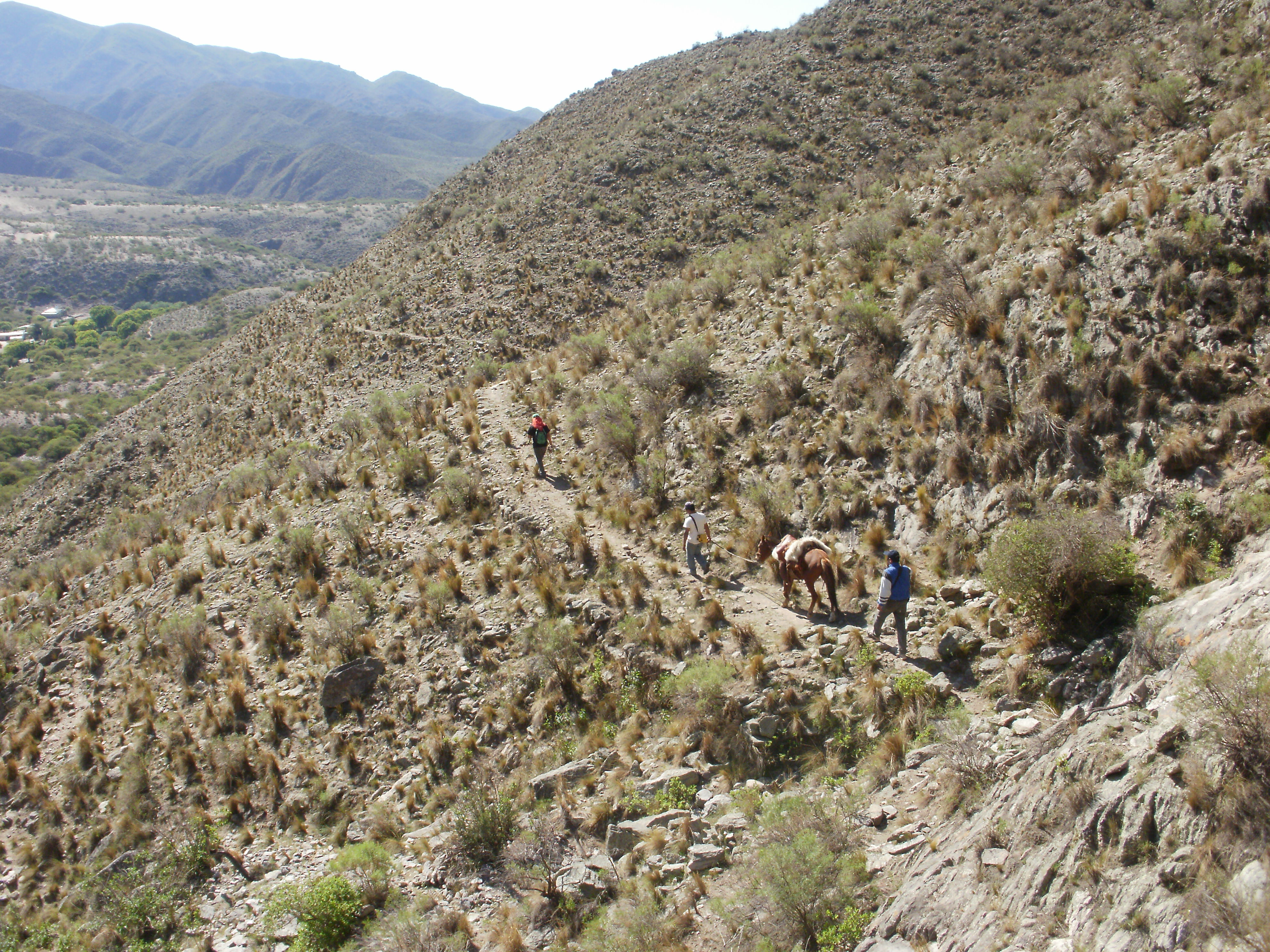
Aconquija

Aconquija is a town and municipality in Catamarca Province in northwestern Argentina.
