= Fabio Vázquez =

Argentine footballer

Personal information
- Full name: Fabio Francisco Vázquez
- Date of birth: 19 February 1994 (age 32)
- Place of birth: Viedma, Río Negro, Argentina
- Height: 1.83 m (6 ft 0 in)
- Position: Midfielder

Team information
- Current team: Estudiantes RC

Youth career
- 2010: CAI

Senior career*
| Years | Team | Apps | (Gls) |
| 2010–2011 | CAI | 1 | (0) |
| 2011–2014 | Argentinos Juniors | 17 | (0) |
| 2015–2016 | Crucero del Norte | 47 | (2) |
| 2016–2017 | Instituto ACC | 26 | (0) |
| 2017–2018 | Brown de Adrogué | 5 | (0) |
| 2018–2019 | Cafetaleros | 20 | (1) |
| 2019–2021 | Sarmiento | 32 | (2) |
| 2021–2023 | Patronato | 49 | (1) |
| 2024 | Antofagasta | 25 | (0) |
| 2025– | Estudiantes RC | 14 | (0) |
- * Club domestic league appearances and goals as of 17:00, 6 August 2025 (UTC)

Fabio Francisco Vázquez (born 19 February 1994) is an Argentinian professional footballer who currently plays for Estudiantes RC as a midfielder.

== Career ==
He joined Argentinos Juniors in July 2011 and made his team debut during the 2011–12 season.
