= Iván Etevenaux =

Argentine footballer (born 1989)

Personal information
- Date of birth: 20 October 1989 (age 37)
- Place of birth: Córdoba, Argentina
- Height: 1.73 m (5 ft 8 in)
- Position: Attacking midfielder

Team information
- Current team: General Paz Juniors

Youth career
- Deportivo Lasallano
- 2008–2010: Belgrano

Senior career*
Years	Team	Apps	(Gls)
2010–2017	Belgrano	51	(5)
2010	→ Juventud Antoniana (loan)		
2014	→ Douglas Haig (loan)	21	(5)
2014	→ Atlético Tucumán (loan)	10	(0)
2017–2019	Sarmiento	4	(0)
2019–2020	Bocale Calcio		
2020	General Paz Juniors	0	(0)
- * Club domestic league appearances and goals as of 17:47, 17 December 2020 (UTC)

Iván Etevenaux (born 20 October 1989) is an Argentine professional footballer who plays as an attacking midfielder for General Paz Juniors.

== Career ==
In his youth career, Etevenaux had a spell with Deportivo Lasallano prior to joining Belgrano. Before making his Belgrano debut, he was loaned out to Torneo Argentino A side Juventud Antoniana. He returned to Belgrano in June 2010 and subsequently made his professional debut on 4 December in a Primera Nacional match against Defensa y Justicia, later that season he scored his first Belgrano goal in a league draw versus Chacarita Juniors. In total, he participated in fourteen matches in all competitions during the 2010–11 season, in-which Belgrano won promotion to the Argentine Primera División.

Etevenaux was loaned out to Primera B Nacional clubs twice during 2014. For the first part of the year, he joined Douglas Haig and scored five goals in twenty-one games. For the second part, he agreed to join Atlético Tucumán and went on to make ten appearances. He returned to Belgrano ahead of the 2015 Argentine Primera División campaign. In July 2017, Etevenaux joined recently relegated Primera B Nacional team Sarmiento. He made his debut for Sarmiento in the Copa Argentina on 6 September, scoring two goals against Sacachispas to send his side into the Round of 16.

In the summer of 2019, after just six appearances for Sarmiento due to injury, Etevenaux joined Italian Eccellenza Calabria club ASD Bocale Calcio. He remained for one season, before returning to his homeland in October 2020 with Torneo Regional Federal Amateur outfit General Paz Juniors.

== Career statistics ==
As of 17 December 2020.

Club statistics
Club	Season	League			Cup		League Cup		Continental		Other		Total	
Club	Season	Division	Apps	Goals	Apps	Goals	Apps	Goals	Apps	Goals	Apps	Goals	Apps	Goals
Belgrano	2009–10	Primera Nacional	0	0	0	0	—		—		0	0	0	0
Belgrano	2010–11	Primera Nacional	14	1	0	0	—		—		0	0	14	1
Belgrano	2011–12	Primera División	1	0	3	0	—		—		0	0	4	0
Belgrano	2012–13	Primera División	2	0	1	0	—		—		0	0	3	0
Belgrano	2013–14	Primera División	1	0	0	0	—		0	0	0	0	1	0
Belgrano	2014	Primera División	0	0	0	0	—		—		0	0	0	0
Belgrano	2015	Primera División	11	0	0	0	—		0	0	0	0	11	0
Belgrano	2016	Primera División	15	4	0	0	—		—		0	0	15	4
Belgrano	2016–17	Primera División	7	0	1	0	—		0	0	0	0	8	0
Belgrano	Total		51	5	5	0	—		0	0	0	0	56	5
Douglas Haig (loan)	2013–14	Primera Nacional	21	5	0	0	—		—		0	0	21	5
Atlético Tucumán (loan)	2014	Primera Nacional	10	0	0	0	—		—		0	0	10	0
Sarmiento	2017–18	Primera Nacional	4	0	2	2	—		—		0	0	6	2
Sarmiento	2018–19	Primera Nacional	0	0	0	0	—		—		0	0	0	0
Sarmiento	Total		4	0	2	2	—		—		0	0	6	2
General Paz Juniors	2020–21	Federal Amateur	0	0	0	0	—		—		0	0	0	0
Career total			86	10	7	2	—		0	0	0	0	93	12
