= Pablo Magnín =

Argentine footballer

Personal information
- Full name: Pablo Daniel Magnín
- Date of birth: 25 April 1990 (age 36)
- Place of birth: Santa Fe, Argentina
- Height: 1.79 m (5 ft 10 in)
- Position: Forward

Team information
- Current team: Sarmiento
- Number: 7

Youth career
- Unión Santa Fe

Senior career*
Years	Team	Apps	(Gls)
2010–2014	Unión Santa Fe	68	(9)
2015	Instituto	38	(10)
2016	San Luis	10	(1)
2016–2017	Instituto	28	(5)
2017–2019	San Martín SJ	16	(0)
2019	Temperley	12	(7)
2019–2020	Sarmiento	18	(15)
2020–2023	Tigre	54	(24)
2023	Melgar	14	(3)
2023–2024	Huachipato	13	(1)
2024–2025	Deportivo Cuenca	28	(15)
2025–	Sarmiento	24	(3)
- * Club domestic league appearances and goals as of 18:04, 10 November 2026 (UTC)

Pablo Daniel Magnín (born 25 April 1990) is an Argentine footballer currently playing for Sarmiento.

== Honours ==
Tigre

- Primera Nacional: 2021

Huachipato

- Primera División: 2023
