= 2014 Torneo Federal A =

I Torneo Federal A
- Season: 2014–15
- Promoted: Guillermo Brown; Estudiantes (SL); Central Córdoba (SdE); Juventud Unida (G); Unión (MdP); Gimnasia y Esgrima (M); Atlético Paraná
- Relegated: No relegation this season
- Matches played: 283
- Goals scored: 649 (2.29 per match)
- Top goalscorer: Hugo Troche (16 goals)
- Biggest home win: San Martín (T) 7-0 Unión Aconquija (October 16)
- Biggest away win: Sol de América (F) 0-4 Sportivo Patria (August 24)
- Highest scoring: San Jorge (T) 4-4 Central Córdoba (SdE) (October 19); Sportivo Patria (T) 5-3 Sarmiento (R) (November 2)
- All statistics correct as of 16 November 2014.

The 2014 season was the first season of the Torneo Federal A, the third professional division of football in Argentina for clubs indirectly affiliated to AFA and successor to the Torneo Argentino A. For this season, AFA decided to change the structure in the Argentine football league system, so 21 teams were invited by the Consejo Federal and 17 accepted the invitation and exceptionally 7 teams were promoted to the next season of Primera B Nacional and there were no relegations for this season. A total of 40 teams competed, including Talleres de Córdoba, recently relegated from the 2013–14 Primera B Nacional.

== Reestructuring ==
=== Invitations ===
| Province | Team | City | Stadium |
|---|---|---|---|
| (Buenos Aires Province) Interior of Buenos Aires | Independiente | Chivilcoy | Raúl Orlando Lungarzo |
| (Catamarca Province) Catamarca | San Lorenzo de Alem | Catamarca | Bicentenario Ciudad de Catamarca |
| (Catamarca Province) Catamarca | Unión Aconquija | Aconquija | Club Tiro Federal y Gimnasia |
| (Chaco Province) Chaco | Sarmiento | Resistencia | Centenario |
| (Corrientes Province) Corrientes | Textil Mandiyú | Corrientes | José Antonio Romero Feris |
| (Formosa Province) Formosa | Sol de América | Formosa | None |
| (Formosa Province) Formosa | Sportivo Patria | Formosa | Antonio Romero |
| (Jujuy Province) Jujuy | Altos Hornos Zapla | Palpalá | Emilio Fabrizzi |
| (La Pampa Province) La Pampa | Ferro Carril Oeste | General Pico | El Coloso del Barrio Talleres |
| (La Pampa Province) La Pampa | General Belgrano | Santa Rosa | Nuevo Rancho Grande |
| (La Rioja Province, Argentina) La Rioja | Andino Sport Club | La Rioja | Carlos Mercado Luna |
| (La Rioja Province, Argentina) La Rioja | Américo Tesorieri | La Rioja | Carlos Mercado Luna |
| (Neuquén Province) Neuquén | Independiente | Neuquén | José Rosas y Perito Moreno |
| (Neuquén Province) Neuquén | Alianza | Cutral Có | Coloso del Ruca Quimey |
| (Río Negro Province) Río Negro | Deportivo Roca | General Roca | Luis Maiolino |
| (San Juan Province, Argentina) San Juan | Unión | Villa Krause | 12 de Octubre |
| (Santiago del Estero Province) Santiago del Estero | Mitre | Santiago del Estero | Doctores José y Antonio Castiglione |

== Format ==
=== First stage ===
The teams were divided into five zones with eight teams (a total of 40 teams) in each zone and it was played in a round-robin tournament. The team placed first of each zone was automatically promoted to Primera B Nacional, the teams placed 2º to 4º and the best 5º team from the five zones qualified for the Second Stage.

=== Second stage ===
Consists of sixteen (16) teams that qualified from the First Stage. It was played in a double-elimination tournament. The order was:

- The five teams placed 2º in their respective zones were enumerated from 1º to 5º according to the points obtained in the First Stage.
- The five teams placed 3º in their respective zones were enumerated from 6º to 10º according to the points obtained in the First Stage.
- The five teams placed 4º in their respective zones were enumerated from 11º to 15º according to the points obtained in the First Stage.
- The best team placed 5º was enumerated 16º.

The playoffs were: 1º vs 16º; 2º vs 15º; 3º vs 14º; 4º vs 13; 5º vs 12º; 6º vs 11º; 7º vs 10º; 8º vs 9º. The winning teams qualified for the Third Stage.

=== Third stage ===
Consists of eight teams that qualified from the Second Stage. It was played in a double-elimination tournament. The teams remain with the designated positions of the Second Stage. The playoffs were: 1º vs 8º; 2º vs 7º; 3º vs 6º; 4º vs 5º. The winning teams qualified for the Fourth Stage.

=== Fourth stage ===
Consists of four(4) teams that qualified from the Second Stage. It was played in a double-elimination tournament. The teams remain with the designated positions of the Second Stage. The playoffs were: 1º vs 4; 2º vs 3º. The winning teams were promoted to Primera B Nacional.

=== Relegations ===
As it is a transition tournament there will be no relegations.

== Club information ==
=== Zone 1 ===
| Team | City | Stadium |
|---|---|---|
| Alianza | Cutral Có | Coloso del Ruca Quimey |
| CAI | Comodoro Rivadavia | Estadio Municipal |
| Cipolletti | Cipolletti | La Visera de Cemento |
| Deportivo Madryn | Puerto Madryn | Coliseo del Golfo |
| Deportivo Roca | General Roca | Luis Maiolino |
| General Belgrano | Santa Rosa | Nuevo Rancho Grande |
| Guillermo Brown | Puerto Madryn | Raul Conti |
| Independiente | Neuquén | José Rosas y Perito Moreno |

=== Zone 2 ===
| Team | City | Stadium |
|---|---|---|
| Américo Tesorieri | La Rioja | Carlos Mercado Luna |
| Andino Sport Club | La Rioja | Carlos Mercado Luna |
| Deportivo Maipú | Maipú | Higinio Sperdutti |
| Estudiantes | San Luis | Héctor Odicino – Pedro Benoza |
| Gimnasia y Esgrima | Mendoza | Víctor Antonio Legrotaglie |
| Juventud Unida Universitario | San Luis | Mario Diez |
| San Lorenzo | Catamarca | Bicentenario Ciudad de Catamarca |
| Unión | Villa Krause | 12 de Octubre |

=== Zone 3 ===
| Team | City | Stadium |
|---|---|---|
| Altos Hornos Zapla | Palpalá | Emilio Fabrizzi |
| Central Córdoba | Santiago del Estero | Alfredo Terrara |
| Gimnasia y Tiro | Salta | Gigante del Norte |
| Juventud Antoniana | Salta | Fray Honorato Pistoia |
| Mitre | Santiago del Estero | Doctores José y Antonio Castiglione |
| San Jorge | San Miguel de Tucumán | Senador Luis Cruz |
| San Martín | San Miguel de Tucumán | La Ciudadela |
| Unión Aconquija | Aconquija | Club Tiro Federal y Gimnasia |

=== Zone 4 ===
| Team | City | Stadium |
|---|---|---|
| Atlético Paraná | Paraná | Pedro Mutio |
| Chaco For Ever | Resistencia | Juan Alberto García |
| Gimnasia y Esgrima | Concepción del Uruguay | Manuel y Ramón Núñez |
| Juventud Unida | Gualeguaychú | Luis Delfino |
| Sarmiento | Resistencia | Centenario |
| Sol de América | Formosa | (None)^{1} |
| Sportivo Patria | Formosa | Antonio Romero |
| Textil Mandiyú | Corrientes | José Antonio Romero Feris |

^{1} Play their home games at Estadio Antonio Romero.

=== Zone 5 ===
| Team | City | Stadium |
|---|---|---|
| Alvarado | Mar del Plata | (None) ^{1} |
| Defensores de Belgrano | Villa Ramallo | Salomón Boeseldín |
| Ferro Carril Oeste | General Pico | El Coloso del Barrio Talleres |
| Independiente | Chivilcoy | Raúl Orlando Lungarzo |
| Libertad | Sunchales | Hogar de Los Tigres |
| Talleres | Córdoba | La Boutique |
| Tiro Federal | Rosario | Fortín de Ludueña |
| Unión | Mar del Plata | (None) ^{1} |

^{1} Play their home games at Estadio José María Minella.

== First stage ==
The teams were divided into five zones and it was played in a round-robin system. The team placed first of each zone was automatically promoted to Primera B Nacional, the teams placed 2º to 4º and the best 5º team from the five zones qualified for the Second Stage.

=== Zone 1 ===
| Pos | Team | Pld | W | D | L | GF | GA | GD | Pts | Promotion or qualification |
|---|---|---|---|---|---|---|---|---|---|---|
| 1 | Guillermo Brown | 14 | 8 | 5 | 1 | 24 | 11 | +13 | 29 | Primera B Nacional |
| 2 | CAI | 14 | 8 | 4 | 2 | 25 | 14 | +11 | 28 | Second Stage |
| 3 | Deportivo Madryn | 14 | 7 | 1 | 6 | 20 | 15 | +5 | 22 | Second Stage |
| 4 | Deportivo Roca (Note: Both teams lost the match 0-1 because of incidents) | 14 | 6 | 1 | 7 | 15 | 21 | −6 | 19 | Second Stage |
| 5 | Independiente (N) | 14 | 5 | 3 | 6 | 15 | 18 | −3 | 18 | |
| 6 | Cipolletti | 14 | 4 | 2 | 8 | 14 | 18 | −4 | 14 | |
| 7 | General Belgrano | 14 | 2 | 6 | 6 | 13 | 18 | −5 | 12 | |
| 8 | Alianza (CC) | 14 | 3 | 2 | 9 | 9 | 22 | −13 | 11 | |

==== Results ====
| Home \ Away | ACC | CAI | CIP | DMA | DRO | GBE | GBR | INE |
|---|---|---|---|---|---|---|---|---|
| Alianza (CC) | | 0–1 | 1–0 | 0–1 | 0–2 | 1–1 | 0–2 | 2–0 |
| CAI | 1–2 | | 1–0 | 1–0 | 3–0 | 2–1 | 2–2 | 2–0 |
| Cipolletti | 2–1 | 2–2 | | 3–2 | 0–1 | 3–1 | 0–2 | 2–1 |
| Deportivo Madryn | 5–1 | 3–2 | 1–0 | | 2–1 | 1–1 | 1–2 | 1–0 |
| Deportivo Roca | 2–1 | 2–2 | | 0–3 | | 2–1 | 2–0 | 1–3 |
| General Belgrano | 0–0 | 1–2 | 2–1 | 1–0 | 0–1 | | 1–1 | 1–1 |
| Guillermo Brown | 2–0 | 1–1 | 2–1 | 2–0 | 3–0 | 1–1 | | 3–1 |
| Independiente (N) | 3–0 | 0–3 | 0–0 | 1–0 | 2–1 | 2–1 | 1–1 | |

Updated to match(es) played on November 9, 2014. Source: AFA
Legend: Blue = home team win; Yellow = draw; Red = away team win.

=== Zone 2 ===
| Pos | Team | Pld | W | D | L | GF | GA | GD | Pts | Promotion or qualification |
|---|---|---|---|---|---|---|---|---|---|---|
| 1 | Estudiantes (SL) | 14 | 10 | 2 | 2 | 26 | 9 | +17 | 32 | Primera B Nacional |
| 2 | San Lorenzo (A) | 14 | 6 | 6 | 2 | 17 | 10 | +7 | 24 | Second Stage |
| 3 | Unión (VK) | 14 | 7 | 3 | 4 | 20 | 16 | +4 | 24 | Second Stage |
| 4 | Gimnasia y Esgrima (M) | 14 | 7 | 2 | 5 | 15 | 12 | +3 | 23 | Second Stage |
| 5 | Juventud Unida Universitario | 14 | 7 | 2 | 5 | 16 | 11 | +5 | 23 | Second Stage |
| 6 | Deportivo Maipú | 14 | 6 | 3 | 5 | 19 | 16 | +3 | 21 | |
| 7 | Américo Tesorieri | 14 | 1 | 2 | 11 | 8 | 26 | −18 | 5 | |
| 8 | Andino | 14 | 0 | 4 | 10 | 7 | 28 | −21 | 4 | |

==== Results ====
| Home \ Away | ATE | AND | DEM | ESL | GEM | JUU | SLA | UVK |
|---|---|---|---|---|---|---|---|---|
| Américo Tesorieri | | 2–1 | 2–3 | 0–1 | 1–2 | 0–0 | 0–2 | 0–1 |
| Andino | 1–1 | | 0–2 | 0–1 | 0–3 | 2–2 | 0–3 | 0–1 |
| Deportivo Maipú | 3–0 | 3–1 | | 2–3 | 1–0 | 0–1 | 0–0 | 0–1 |
| Estudiantes (SL) | 4–1 | 3–0 | 4–0 | | 1–0 | 2–0 | 1–1 | 3–1 |
| Gimnasia y Esgrima (M) | 1–0 | 0–0 | 1–1 | 1–2 | | 1–1 | 2–1 | 1–2 |
| Juventud Unida Universitario | 1–0 | 3–0 | 1–0 | 1–0 | 0–1 | | 0–1 | 3–2 |
| San Lorenzo (A) | 1–0 | 3–1 | 0–0 | 1–1 | 3–1 | 0–3 | | 0–0 |
| Unión (VK) | 5–1 | 1–1 | 2–4 | 1–0 | 0–1 | 2–1 | 1–1 | |

Updated to match(es) played on November 9, 2014. Source: AFA
Legend: Blue = home team win; Yellow = draw; Red = away team win.

=== Zone 3 ===
| Pos | Team | Pld | W | D | L | GF | GA | GD | Pts | Promotion or qualification |
|---|---|---|---|---|---|---|---|---|---|---|
| 1 | Central Córdoba (SdE) | 14 | 9 | 1 | 4 | 20 | 14 | +6 | 28 | Primera B Nacional |
| 2 | Unión Aconquija | 14 | 9 | 1 | 4 | 14 | 15 | −1 | 28 | Second Stage |
| 3 | Mitre (SdE) | 14 | 6 | 5 | 3 | 16 | 10 | +6 | 23 | Second Stage |
| 4 | Juventud Antoniana | 14 | 5 | 6 | 3 | 17 | 14 | +3 | 21 | Second Stage |
| 5 | San Martín (T) | 14 | 4 | 5 | 5 | 15 | 11 | +4 | 17 | |
| 6 | Altos Hornos Zapla | 14 | 4 | 3 | 7 | 10 | 15 | −5 | 15 | |
| 7 | San Jorge (T) | 14 | 2 | 5 | 7 | 15 | 22 | −7 | 11 | |
| 8 | Gimnasia y Tiro | 14 | 2 | 4 | 8 | 13 | 19 | −6 | 10 | |

==== Tiebreaker ====
| Team 1 | Score | Team 2 |
|---|---|---|
| Central Córdoba (SdE) | 3-2 (a.e.t.) | Unión Aconquija |

==== Results ====
| Home \ Away | AHZ | CCO | GYT | JUA | MIT | SJT | SMT | UAC |
|---|---|---|---|---|---|---|---|---|
| Altos Hornos Zapla | | 0–2 | 1–0 | 2–2 | 0–1 | 1–0 | 0–1 | 0–1 |
| Central Córdoba (SdE) | 2–1 | | 1–0 | 1–2 | 2–1 | 1–0 | 1–1 | 2–0 |
| Gimnasia y Tiro | 0–1 | 1–2 | | 0–2 | 3–1 | 2–2 | 0–0 | 1–2 |
| Juventud Antoniana | 2–2 | 0–1 | 0–1 | | 1–1 | 1–0 | 2–1 | 2–0 |
| Mitre (SdE) | 2–0 | 2–0 | 1–1 | 1–1 | | 2–1 | 0–0 | 0–0 |
| San Jorge (T) | 1–1 | 4–4 | 3–2 | 1–1 | 0–3 | | 0–1 | 1–0 |
| San Martín (T) | 0–1 | 1–2 | 1–1 | 1–1 | 0–1 | 1–1 | | 7–0 |
| Unión Aconquija | 1–0 | 1–0 | 2–1 | 2–0 | 1–0 | 2–1 | 2–0 | |

Updated to match(es) played on November 9, 2014. Source: AFA
Legend: Blue = home team win; Yellow = draw; Red = away team win.

=== Zone 4 ===
| Pos | Team | Pld | W | D | L | GF | GA | GD | Pts | Promotion or qualification |
|---|---|---|---|---|---|---|---|---|---|---|
| 1 | Juventud Unida (G) | 14 | 7 | 3 | 4 | 17 | 15 | +2 | 24 | Primera B Nacional |
| 2 | Sportivo Patria | 14 | 5 | 8 | 1 | 21 | 13 | +8 | 23 | Second Stage |
| 3 | Atlético Paraná | 14 | 4 | 7 | 3 | 12 | 12 | 0 | 19 | Second Stage |
| 4 | Chaco For Ever | 14 | 4 | 6 | 4 | 17 | 20 | −3 | 18 | Second Stage |
| 5 | Textil Mandiyú | 14 | 4 | 5 | 5 | 14 | 12 | +2 | 17 | |
| 6 | Gimnasia y Esgrima (CdU) | 14 | 3 | 6 | 5 | 20 | 19 | +1 | 15 | |
| 7 | Sarmiento (R) | 14 | 3 | 6 | 5 | 17 | 22 | −5 | 15 | |
| 8 | Sol de América (F) | 14 | 4 | 3 | 7 | 15 | 20 | −5 | 15 | |

==== Results ====
| Home \ Away | APA | CFE | GYE | JUG | SAR | SOL | SPP | TEM |
|---|---|---|---|---|---|---|---|---|
| Atlético Paraná | | 2–1 | 1–1 | 1–0 | 0–0 | 3–1 | 0–0 | 1–0 |
| Chaco For Ever | 1–1 | | 2–1 | 3–2 | 0–1 | 1–0 | 2–2 | 1–1 |
| Gimnasia y Esgrima (CdU) | 1–1 | 5–0 | | 1–2 | 2–0 | 1–1 | 3–1 | 0–0 |
| Juventud Unida (G) | 2–1 | 1–1 | 2–1 | | 1–0 | 2–0 | 0–1 | 0–3 |
| Sarmiento (R) | 1–1 | 1–0 | 1–1 | 3–3 | | 1–1 | 1–1 | 0–3 |
| Sol de América (F) | 2–0 | 2–2 | 4–0 | 0–1 | 3–1 | | 0–4 | 1–0 |
| Sportivo Patria | 0–0 | 1–1 | 3–2 | 0–0 | 5–3 | 2–0 | | 0–0 |
| Textil Mandiyú | 2–0 | 0–2 | 1–1 | 0–1 | 1–4 | 2–0 | 1–1 | |

Updated to match(es) played on November 9, 2014. Source: AFA
Legend: Blue = home team win; Yellow = draw; Red = away team win.

=== Zone 5 ===
| Pos | Team | Pld | W | D | L | GF | GA | GD | Pts | Promotion or qualification |
|---|---|---|---|---|---|---|---|---|---|---|
| 1 | Unión (MdP) | 14 | 7 | 5 | 2 | 21 | 13 | +8 | 26 | Primera B Nacional |
| 2 | Talleres (C) | 14 | 7 | 5 | 2 | 21 | 13 | +8 | 26 | Second Stage |
| 3 | Libertad (S) | 14 | 6 | 5 | 3 | 22 | 16 | +6 | 23 | Second Stage |
| 4 | Tiro Federal | 14 | 3 | 9 | 2 | 18 | 15 | +3 | 18 | Second Stage |
| 5 | Defensores de Belgrano (VR) | 14 | 4 | 6 | 4 | 14 | 11 | +3 | 18 | |
| 6 | Independiente (Ch) | 14 | 4 | 4 | 6 | 11 | 18 | −7 | 16 | |
| 7 | Ferro Carril Oeste (GP) | 14 | 3 | 5 | 6 | 10 | 16 | −6 | 14 | |
| 8 | Alvarado | 14 | 0 | 5 | 9 | 7 | 22 | −15 | 5 | |

==== Tiebreaker ====
| Team 1 | Score | Team 2 |
|---|---|---|
| Talleres (C) | 0-1 | Unión (MdP) |

==== Results ====
| Home \ Away | ALV | DVR | FCO | ICH | LIB | TAL | TIF | UNI |
|---|---|---|---|---|---|---|---|---|
| Alvarado | | 0–3 | 2–4 | 0–2 | 2–2 | 1–3 | 0–0 | 1–1 |
| Defensores de Belgrano (VR) | 1–0 | | 0–1 | 0–0 | 1–3 | 0–2 | 1–1 | 2–0 |
| Ferro Carril Oeste (GP) | 0–0 | 1–0 | | 0–0 | 0–2 | 0–1 | 1–1 | 0–1 |
| Independiente (Ch) | 2–1 | 0–3 | 1–0 | | 1–2 | 0–0 | 0–2 | 1–2 |
| Libertad (S) | 2–0 | 0–0 | 0–0 | 4–1 | | 1–1 | 3–3 | 1–0 |
| Talleres (C) | 1–0 | 2–2 | 4–0 | 2–0 | 1–0 | | 2–2 | 1–4 |
| Tiro Federal | 1–0 | 1–1 | 2–2 | 1–2 | 2–0 | 0–0 | | 1–1 |
| Unión (MdP) | 0–0 | 0–0 | 2–1 | 1–1 | 4–2 | 3–1 | 2–1 | |

Updated to match(es) played on November 9, 2014. Source: AFA
Legend: Blue = home team win; Yellow = draw; Red = away team win.

== Second to Fourth stage ==
=== Ordering Table ===
| Pos | Team | Pld | W | D | L | GF | GA | GD | Pts | Qualification |
|---|---|---|---|---|---|---|---|---|---|---|
| 1 | CAI | 14 | 8 | 4 | 2 | 25 | 14 | +11 | 28 | Team placed 2º |
| 2 | Unión Aconquija | 14 | 9 | 1 | 4 | 14 | 15 | −1 | 28 | Team placed 2º |
| 3 | Talleres (C) | 14 | 7 | 5 | 2 | 21 | 13 | +8 | 26 | Team placed 2º |
| 4 | San Lorenzo (A) | 14 | 6 | 6 | 2 | 17 | 10 | +7 | 24 | Team placed 2º |
| 5 | Sportivo Patria | 14 | 5 | 8 | 1 | 21 | 13 | +8 | 23 | Team placed 2º |
| 6 | Unión (VK) | 14 | 7 | 3 | 4 | 20 | 15 | +5 | 24 | Team placed 3º |
| 7 | Libertad (S) | 14 | 6 | 5 | 3 | 22 | 16 | +6 | 23 | Team placed 3º |
| 8 | Mitre (SdE) | 14 | 6 | 5 | 3 | 16 | 10 | +6 | 23 | Team placed 3º |
| 9 | Deportivo Madryn | 14 | 7 | 1 | 6 | 20 | 15 | +5 | 22 | Team placed 3º |
| 10 | Atlético Paraná | 14 | 4 | 7 | 3 | 12 | 12 | 0 | 19 | Team placed 3º |
| 11 | Gimnasia y Esgrima (M) | 14 | 7 | 2 | 5 | 15 | 12 | +3 | 23 | Team placed 4º |
| 12 | Juventud Antoniana | 14 | 5 | 6 | 3 | 17 | 14 | +3 | 21 | Team placed 4º |
| 13 | Deportivo Roca | 14 | 6 | 1 | 7 | 15 | 20 | −5 | 19 | Team placed 4º |
| 14 | Tiro Federal | 14 | 3 | 9 | 2 | 18 | 15 | +3 | 18 | Team placed 4º |
| 15 | Chaco For Ever | 14 | 4 | 6 | 4 | 17 | 20 | −3 | 18 | Team placed 4º |
| 16 | Juventud Unida Universitario | 14 | 7 | 2 | 5 | 16 | 11 | +5 | 23 | Team placed 5º |

=== Second stage ===
| Team 1 | Agg. | Team 2 | 1st leg | 2nd leg |
|---|---|---|---|---|
| CAI | 2–2 (5–3 p) | Juventud Unida Universitario | 2–1 | 0–1 |
| Unión Aconquija | 1–0 | Chaco For Ever | 1–0 | 0–0 |
| Talleres (C) | 2–1 | Tiro Federal | 2–1 | 0–0 |
| San Lorenzo (A) | 3–0 | Deportivo Roca | 1–0 | 2–0 |
| Sportivo Patria | 3–2 | Juventud Antoniana | 1–1 | 2–1 |
| Unión (VK) | 2–2 (3–4 p) | Gimnasia y Esgrima (M) | 1–2 | 1–0 |
| Libertad (S) | 3–4 | Atlético Paraná | 0–3 | 3–1 |
| Mitre (SdE) | 4–2 | Deportivo Madryn | 1–1 | 3–1 |

=== Third stage ===
| Team 1 | Agg. | Team 2 | 1st leg | 2nd leg |
|---|---|---|---|---|
| CAI | 1–2 | Gimnasia y Esgrima (M) | 0–2 | 1–0 |
| Unión Aconquija | 3–5 | Atlético Paraná | 2–5 | 1–0 |
| Talleres (C) | 3–3 (4–3 p) | Mitre (SdE) | 1–1 | 2–2 |
| San Lorenzo (A) | 3–4 | Sportivo Patria | 0–2 | 3–2 |

=== Fourth stage ===
The winners were promoted.

| Team 1 | Agg. | Team 2 | 1st leg | 2nd leg |
|---|---|---|---|---|
| Talleres (C) | 1–3 | Gimnasia y Esgrima (M) | 1–2 | 0–1 |
| Sportivo Patria | 1–5 | Atlético Paraná | 0–2 | 1–3 |

== Season statistics ==
=== Top scorers ===
| Rank | Player | Club | Goals |
|---|---|---|---|
| 1 | (Argentina) Hugo Troche | Sportivo Patria | 16 |
| 2 | (Argentina) Sergio Viturro | Estudiantes (SL) | 10 |
| 2 | (Argentina) Wilson Albarracin | Unión (MdP) | 10 |
| 4 | (Argentina) Gonzalo Garavano | Sarmiento (R) | 8 |
| 4 | (Argentina) Sergio Chitero | Atlético Paraná | 8 |
| 4 | (Argentina) Mauro Villegas | CAI | 8 |

== See also ==
- 2013–14 in Argentine football
