= Guillermo Farré =

Argentine footballer

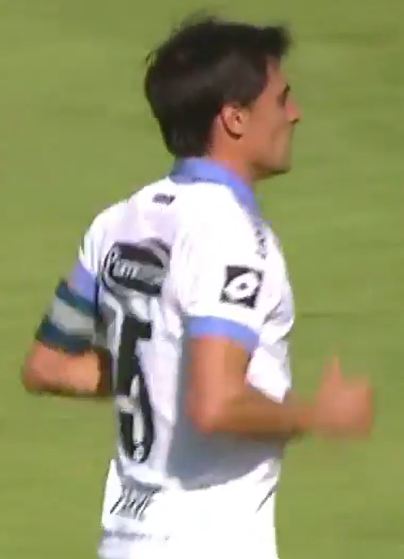
- Farré as a Belgrano player in 2014

Personal information
- Full name: Guillermo Martín Farré
- Date of birth: 16 March 1981 (age 45)
- Place of birth: Colón, Argentina
- Height: 1.76 m (5 ft 9 in)
- Position: Midfielder

Team information
- Current team: Palestino (head coach)

Senior career*
Years	Team	Apps	(Gls)
2001–2007	Central Córdoba (Rosario)	136	(9)
2007–2017	Belgrano	313	(15)
2017–2019	Sarmiento	49	(1)
2019–2020	Atlético Mitre	13	(0)
2020	Estudiantes de Río Cuarto	1	(0)

Managerial career
- 2021: Estudiantes (assistant)
- 2021–2024: Belgrano
- 2024–2025: Sporting Cristal
- 2025–2026: Aldosivi
- 2026–: Palestino
- * Club domestic league appearances and goals

Guillermo Martín Farré (born 16 August 1981) is an Argentine football manager and former player who played as a midfielder. He is the current manager of Palestino.

== Career ==
Farré played club football for Belgrano. He scored a famous goal in the second leg of the club's 2010–11 Primera B Nacional promotion playoff victory over River Plate.

After he retired from playing, Farré became an assistant of Ricardo Zielinski at Estudiantes de La Plata before becoming the manager of former side Belgrano on 19 May 2021. He led Belgrano to the 2022 Primera Nacional title.

Farré resigned from Belgrano on 13 March 2024. He moved abroad for the first time in his career on 12 June, after taking over Peruvian club Sporting Cristal.

== Managerial statistics ==
As of 7 November 2026

Managerial record by team and tenure
Team	Nat	From	To	Record							
Team	Nat	From	To	G	W	D	L	GF	GA	GD	Win %
Belgrano	(Argentina)	19 May 2021	13 March 2024	118	55	31	32	137	103	+34	46.61
Sporting Cristal	(Peru)	12 June 2024	10 April 2025	26	13	5	8	61	31	+30	50.00
Aldosivi	(Argentina)	3 September 2025	17 March 2026	19	6	5	8	18	19	−1	31.58
Palestino	(Chile)	26 April 2026	present	29	11	7	11	44	39	+5	37.93
Total				192	85	48	59	260	192	+68	44.27

== Honours ==
=== Manager ===
Belgrano

- Primera Nacional: 2022
