= Unión de Mar del Plata =

CA Unión
- Full name: Club Atlético Unión de Mar del Plata
- Nickname: El Celeste (The Lightblue)
- Founded: 1 December 1926; 99 years ago
- Ground: Estadio José María Minella, Mar del Plata, Buenos Aires
- Capacity: 35,350
- Chairman: Leonardo Cordeiro
- Manager: --
- League: None
- 2015 B Nacional: 22nd (relegated)
- Website: http://clubunion.com.ar/
Home colours	Away colours	Third colours

Club Atlético Unión de Mar del Plata is an Argentine sports club from Mar del Plata, Buenos Aires Province. The club was founded on 1 December 1926, and its main sports are football and basketball. In football, Unión currently plays in the Torneo Argentino A, which is the regionalised third division of the Argentine football league system.

== History ==
=== Foundation ===
A group of friends who usually met at a grocery store called La Unión Italiana (located on the corner of Dorrego and 9 de Julio streets in Mar del Plata) decided to form a football team wearing as their uniform shirts in light blue and white. Those shirts had been given to them by the cigarettes manufacturer Dollar.

The owner of that grocery store, Mr. Vignatti, organized a picnic which included a football match. That game produced a great enthusiasm on the group of youth players, who decided to found a club. Therefore, on 1 December 1926, the Club Atlético Unión was launched. The colors adopted were the same as they had worn in those first matches (light blue and white).

One of those players (then a radio broadcaster), Felipe Yódice, was the person who suggested the name of the club which was finally adopted. The club's first address was on 3826 25 de Mayo St, but has since moved to different locations.

=== Football campaigns ===
Unión played in the Liga Marplatense de Fútbol (Mar del Plata Football League) since 1927, having won the championship in 1946 and 2006. The last title allowed Unión to participate in the 2007 season of the Torneo del Interior (regionalized fifth division), where they lost the final. After that, Unión was promoted to the Torneo Argentino B first (after defeating Gimnasia y Esgrima de Santa Fe) and then to the Torneo Argentino A (after winning the finals against Sportivo Belgrano).

== Basketball ==
Unión plays in the Asociación Marplatense de Basketball (Mar del Plata Basketball Association), having won over 20 championships. In addition, Unión played the Campeonato Regional (Regional Championship) from 2004 to 2007.
