= Estadio Eva Perón =

Football stadium in Junín, Argentina

Coordinates: 34°35′07″S 60°55′45″W

Eva Perón Stadium
- Estadio Eva Perón

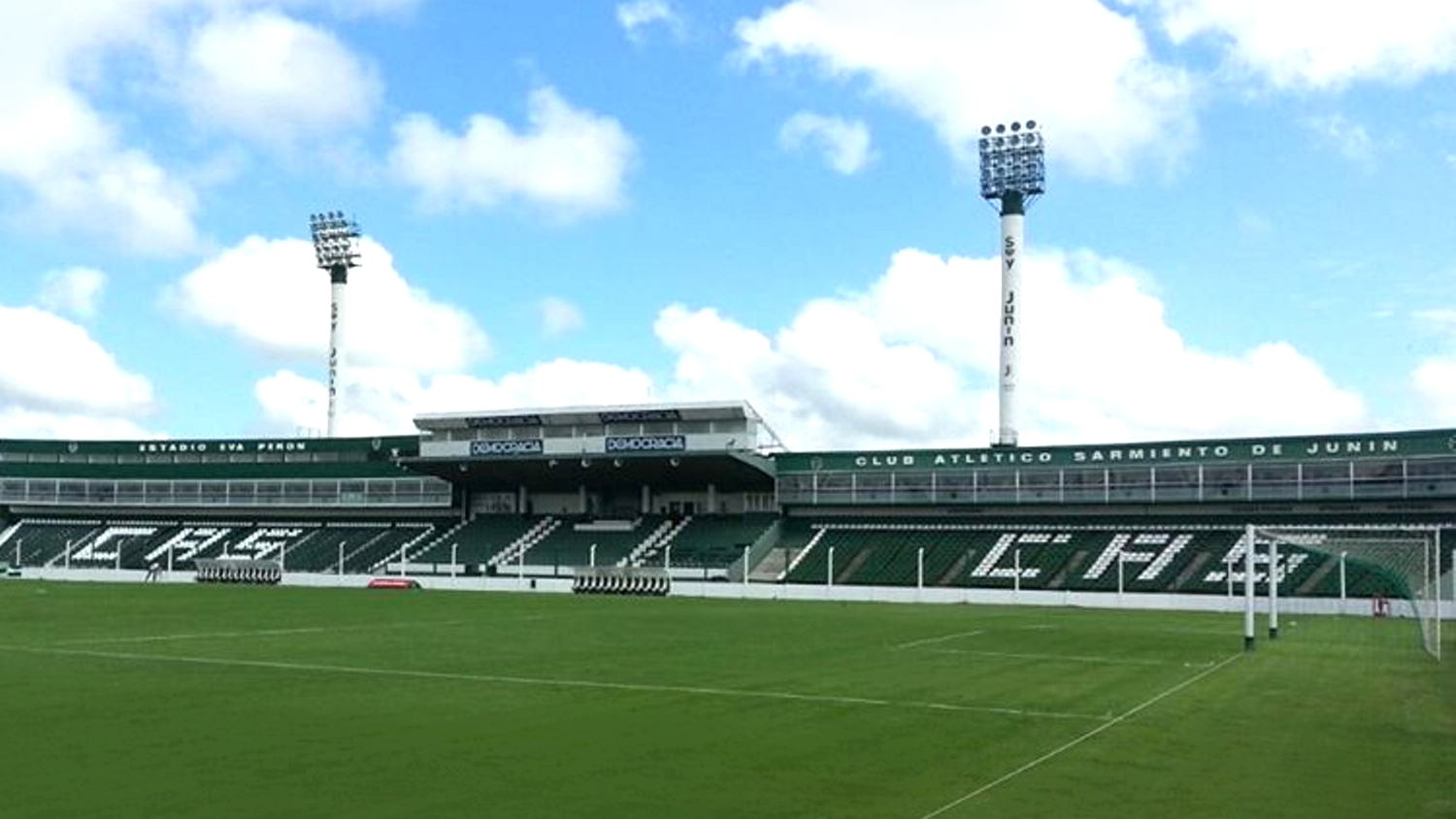
- View of the field and grandstands over Necochea street in 2015
- Interactive map of Eva Perón Stadium
- Address: Necochea 25; Junín; Argentina
- Owner: C.A. Sarmiento
- Capacity: 23,156
- Surface: Grass

Construction
- Opened: July 9, 1951; 75 years ago
- Cost: m$s250,000

Tenant
- C.A. Sarmiento (1951–present)

Website
- clubatleticosarmiento.com/estadio

Estadio Eva Perón is a stadium in Junín, Buenos Aires Province, Argentina. It has a capacity of 22,000 spectators since the most recent renovation works. It is the home of Club Atlético Sarmiento, which currently plays in Primera División, the first division of the Argentine football league system. The stadium, inaugurated in 1951, was named after Eva Perón, First Lady of Argentina between 1946 and her death in 1952.

== History ==
By the 1940s, Sarmiento was the most representative team of Junín and the most winning squad of local league, "Liga Deportiva del Oeste". María Eva Duarte had lived in Junín between 1930 and 1934 before settling in Buenos Aires. Her older brother, Juan, had become friend of Héctor Díaz who was close to members of Sarmiento's committee. After Eva Duarte married Juan Perón, Juan Duarte became private secretary of Perón. In those years, the government granted subsidies for clubs to construct or expand their venues. Some members of Sarmiento's executive committee met with the Secretary of the Treasury and Public Credit, Ramón Cereijo, and got the money to build a stadium. Sarmiento was granted m$n250,000.

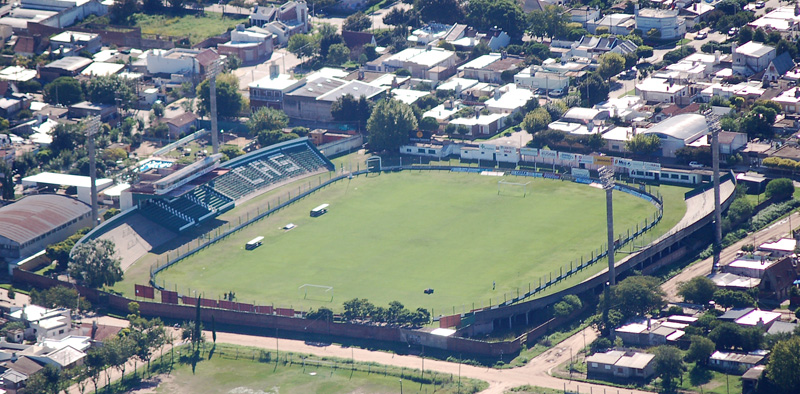
View of the stadium in 2007

In 1948, Díaz became president of Sarmiento. That same year, building work for the stadium began. Construction took three years until the stadium was inaugurated on 9 July 1951. with two matches, Sarmiento vs. Vélez Sársfield and River Plate vs. Racing. Days later a bust of Eva Perón was unveiled, followed by several athletics competitions, finishing with a banquet at night to honor the several personalities attending the celebrations. Eva Duarte could not attend the event due to her illness (she died one year later).

After the Revolución Libertadora of 1955, the club was forbidden to use the "Eva Perón" (or any name related with politicians) in 1963. The bust was retired from the hall, and the letters with the legend "Eva Perón" (that erected over one of the grandstands) demolished. The bust would put back in 1974, but removed again by the military dictatorship in 1976. The name "Eva Perón" was reestablished as the stadium name in 2009. New letters were also put back on the grandstands, although they were made of plate instead of cement. They were made by a local cooperative. On the other hand, the bust could not be found and is still missing. Sarmiento paid off the loan in 1968.

Until 2017, the capacity of the stadium was 17,000. That same year, it was expanded after constructing a new grandstand on Arias street that increased its capacity to 22,000 spectators.
