= Torneo Argentino C =

- Founded: 2005
- Folded: 2014
- Country: Argentina
- Confederation: CONMEBOL
- Level on pyramid: 5
- Promotion to: Torneo Argentino B
- Relegation to: Regional Leagues
- Website: Official webpage

The Torneo Argentino C (officially Torneo del Interior) was one of the two leagues that form the regionalised fifth level of the Argentine football league system. The competition was organized by the Federal Council (Consejo Federal), an internal organ of the Argentine Football Association (AFA), and was contested by clubs indirectly affiliated to the Association. In other words, the clubs that played in the tournament are affiliated to their local leagues, that in turn are affiliated to AFA.

The tournament was disputed by teams from all around the country, except from Buenos Aires, Greater Buenos Aires, Rosario and Santa Fe, whose teams are directly affiliated. Teams directly affiliated play in the other regionalised fifth tier, the Primera D Metropolitana.

Teams in the Argentino C played for promotion to the Torneo Argentino B. On the other hand, there is no unique league below this level. Teams were relegated to their original regional leagues.

== List of champions ==
European-styled seasons

Season	Winners / Promoted	Also Promoted
2005	Rivadavia (L); Real Arroyo Seco	Crucero del Norte
2006	9 de Julio (RT); Deportivo Coreano; Sol de América (F)	Bella Vista (BB)
2007	Atenas (RC); Liniers (BB); Tiro Federal (M)	Colegiales (C); Defensores (S); Atlético Famaillá; Tres Algarrobos
2008	Atlético Concepción; Huracán (C); Sportivo del Bono	Unión (MdP)
2009	Independiente (T); Unión (VK); Ferro Carril Sud (O)	Boca (RG)
2010	Origone; Argentino (25dM); Sarmiento (SdE)	Altos Hornos Zapla; Atlético Paraná
2011	Huracán Las Heras; Once Tigres; San Martín (F)	Jorge Newbery (CR)
2012	Estudiantes (SL); Independiente (Ch); Rivadavia (VT)	Independiente (N)
2013	25 de Mayo (La Pampa); Argentino de Quilmes (R); Argentino Peñarol; Atenas de Pocito; Atlético Adelante; Atlético Amalia; Atlético Laguna Blanca; Belgrano (E); Camioneros; Camioneros Argentinos del Norte; CEC; Coronel Aguirre; Deportivo Achirense; Deportivo Tabacal; Everton (LP); Independiente Villa Obrera; Jorge Newbery (Villa Mercedes); Kimberley; Petrolero Austral; Resistencia Central; San Martín (Monte Comán)	—
2014	Almirante Brown (Lules); Américo Tesorieri; Atlético Famaillá; Atlético Pellegrini (Salta); Bella Vista (Tucumán); Boxing; Bragado Club; Colón Junior; Comercio (Santa Sylvina); Comercio Central Unidos; Defensores de Valeria del Mar; Defensores de Pronunciamiento; El Linqueño; Ferrocarril Roca (Las Flores); General Belgrano; Güemes; Huracán Las Heras; Independiente (Fernández); Jorge Gibson Brown; La Emilia; La Salle Jobson; Libertad (Concordia); Luján SC; Maronese; San Carlos (La Escondida); Sarmiento (CS); Social Obrero; Sportivo Ballofet; Sportivo Baradero; Sportivo Peñarol	—

== See also ==
- Argentine football league system
- List of football clubs in Argentina

Preceded by Torneo Regionales Nacionales	Torneo Argentino C 2005-2014	Succeeded by Torneo Federal C
