= Juan Caviglia (footballer) =

Argentine professional footballer

Personal information
- Date of birth: 16 June 1997 (age 29)
- Place of birth: Junín, Argentina
- Position: Midfielder

Team information
- Current team: Deportes Quindío

Youth career
- Mariano Moreno de Junín
- 2014–2018: Sarmiento

Senior career*
Years	Team	Apps	(Gls)
2018–2021	Sarmiento	15	(0)
2021	→ Ferro Pico (loan)	10	(0)
2022–2024	Estudiantes San Luis	1	(0)
2025-	Deportes Quindío		
- * Club domestic league appearances and goals as of 20:45, 2 May 2022 (UTC)

Juan Caviglia (born 16 June 1997) is an Argentine professional footballer who plays as a midfielder for Deportes Quindío.

== Career ==
Caviglia's career got underway in the senior ranks of Sarmiento, who signed him from Mariano Moreno de Junín in 2014. After being an unused substitute for a Primera B Nacional loss away to Brown on 3 March 2018, Caviglia went on to make five more appearances in the 2017–18 season which included his senior bow against Independiente Rivadavia on 18 March.

After a loan spell at Ferro Pico in 2021, Caviglia left Sarmiento and joined Estudiantes San Luis in February 2022.

== Career statistics ==
As of 27 March 2019.

Appearances and goals by club, season and competition
Club	Season	League			Cup		Continental		Other		Total	
Club	Season	Division	Apps	Goals	Apps	Goals	Apps	Goals	Apps	Goals	Apps	Goals
Sarmiento	2018–19	Primera B Nacional	8	0	0	0	—		0	0	8	0
Career total			8	0	0	0	—		0	0	8	0
