= Torneo Argentino B =

- Organising body: Argentine Football Association
- Founded: 1995
- Folded: 2014
- Country: Argentina
- Confederation: CONMEBOL
- Level on pyramid: 4
- Promotion to: Torneo Argentino A
- Relegation to: Torneo Argentino C
- Domestic cup: Copa Argentina
- Last champions: Deportivo Madryn; Atlético Paraná; Gimnasia y Esgrima (M)
- Most championships: Central Norte; Gimnasia y Esgrima (M) (2 titles each)
- Website: Official webpage

Torneo Argentino B was one of two leagues that form the fourth level of the Argentine football league system, made up of 100+ teams playing within eight regional zones across Argentina.

The other league at level four was – and still is – the Primera C Metropolitana, which is a competition for the numerous clubs in the city of Buenos Aires and the Greater Buenos Aires metropolitan area.

The Torneo Argentino B season would end with the top teams from each zone playing in cross-over playoffs, culminating with overall champions and a number of teams (varied by season) eligible for promotion to the following season's Torneo Argentino A competition.

The Torneo Argentino B was replaced with the similar Torneo Federal B for the 2014–15 season (itself reorganized as the nine zone Torneo Regional Federal Amateur for the 2018–19 season ), while the Primera C continued on as its tier four companion for the Buenos Aires area.

== List of champions ==
European-styled seasons

Ed.	Season	Champions	Also Promoted
1	1995–96	Almirante Brown (A); Mataderos (N)	—
2	1996–97	Ben Hur; San Martín (MC)	—
3	1997–98	Ñuñorco; Central Córdoba (SdE)	—
4	1998–99	Racing (C); Huracán (TA)	Tiro Federal; C.A.I. 13 de Junio (P)
5	1999–00	Chacras (C)	Liniers (BB)
6	2000–01	Juventud Unida Universitario; 9 de Julio (R)	Estudiantes (RC)
7	2001–02	Independiente (VO); Talleres (P)	—
8	2002–03	Guillermo Brown; La Florida	Gimnasia y Esgrima (Mza); Unión (S)
9	2003–04	Candelaria; Desamparados	Rosario Puerto Belgrano
10	2004–05	San Martín (T); Sportivo Patria	Juventud (P); La Plata; Racing (O)
11	2005–06	Central Norte; Gimnasia y Esgrima (Mza); Santamarina	Alumni (VM); Real Arroyo Seco; Rivadavia
12	2006–07	Boca Unidos; Cipolletti; Libertad (S)	—
13	2007–08	Deportivo Maipú; Patronato	Alvarado; Central Córdoba (SdE)
14	2008–09	Unión (MdP); Estudiantes (RC)	Crucero del Norte; Sportivo Belgrano
15	2009–10	Central Norte; Douglas Haig	—
16	2010–11	Gimnasia y Tiro; Racing (O)	Defensores de Belgrano (VR)
17	2011–12	Alvarado; Guaraní Antonio Franco	San Jorge (T)
18	2012–13	C.A.I. Chaco For Ever; Estudiantes (SL)	Juventud Unida (G)
19	2013–14	Deportivo Madryn; Atlético Paraná; Gimnasia y Esgrima (M)	—

== See also ==
- Argentine football league system
- List of football clubs in Argentina

Preceded by –	Torneo Argentino B 1995-2014	Succeeded by Torneo Federal B
