= 2019–20 Gimnasia y Esgrima de Mendoza season =

Gimnasia y Esgrima
2019–20 season
- President: Fernando Porretta
- Manager: Diego Pozo
- Stadium: Estadio Víctor Antonio Legrotaglie
- Copa Argentina: Round of 32
- Top goalscorer: League: Leandro Aguirre (1); All: Renzo Vera (1); Leandro Aguirre

The 2019–20 season is Gimnasia y Esgrima's 2nd consecutive season in the second division of Argentine football. In addition to Primera B Nacional, the club are competing in the Copa Argentina.

The season generally covers the period from 1 July 2019 to 30 June 2020.

== Review ==
=== Pre-season ===
Neri Espinosa was the first player out the door, as his move to Deportivo Maipú of Torneo Federal A was confirmed on 4 June 2019. Nine days later, Mateo Ramírez joined fellow Primera B Nacional team Guillermo Brown. Gimnasia y Esgrima announced their first incoming on 15 June as Brian Alferez was loaned from Godoy Cruz. In the subsequent five days, Gonzalo Bazán and Lucas Baldunciel departed to Platense and Temperley respectively. A third and fourth player left between 25-27 June, with Lucas Márquez and Diego Auzqui going to Mitre. Patricio Cucchi went abroad on 28 June, signing with Atlético Nacional of Categoría Primera A. Right midfielder Pablo Cortizo headed off to top-flight Patronato on 30 June. Numerous 2018–19 loans expired on/around on 30 June.

San Martín signed forward Sebastián Matos on 2 July. Their first permanent transaction was made on 4 July in Iván Ramírez from Flandria. Lucas Carrizo and Renzo Vera were revealed as new signings on 7 July. Primera División side Godoy Cruz were Gimnasia'a first opponents of pre-season, facing them on 11 July though failing to come out on top across two matches.

=== July ===
Gimnasia y Esgrima met River Plate in a round of thirty-two tie in the Copa Argentina on 16 July, they would eventually lose out on penalties after a score draw in normal time; where Renzo Vera netted, while Brian Andrada missed the decisive spot-kick. Federico Mazur arrived from Temperley on 23 July. Jacobo Mansilla made a move from Patronato on 25 July. Gimnasia lost in back-to-back friendlies with San Martín (SJ) on 27 July.

=== August ===
3 August saw Gonzalo Berterame sign from San Lorenzo. Six days later, Gimnasia met their third opponent of pre-season in Belgrano - drawing and losing, taking their overall winless streak to seven matches. On 12 August, another new player arrived from San Lorenzo as Alejandro Molina put pen to paper. Felix Orode signed from Defensores de Pronunciamiento on 13 August, while Luis Salces followed the Nigerian attacking midfielder in on 14 August. Stefano Brundo went off to Atlético de Rafaela on 12 August. Gimnasia's first fixture in Primera B Nacional ended in a goalless draw versus Defensores de Belgrano at the Estadio Víctor Antonio Legrotaglie on 18 August. Leandro Aguirre converted an early penalty to seal victory over Almagro on 25 August.

Gonzalo Marronkle debuted against Almagro, despite no official confirmation from the club regarding his arrival. Lisandro Cabrera was loaned from Newell's Old Boys on 27 August.

=== September ===
Gimnasia failed to score for the second successive home match on 2 September, as they drew 0–0 with Quilmes.

== Squad ==
Squad No.	Nationality	Name	Position(s)	Date of birth (age)	Signed from
Goalkeepers
	Argentina	Tomás Giménez	GK	29 October 1998 (age 28)	Academy
	Argentina	Tomás Marchiori	GK	20 June 1995 (age 31)	Academy
	Argentina	Alejo Tello	GK	14 October 1999 (age 27)	Academy
Defenders
	Argentina	Leandro Aguirre	LB	8 February 1989 (age 37)	Valletta
	Argentina	Brian Alferez	CB	4 April 1998 (age 28)	Godoy Cruz (loan)
	Argentina	Miguel Barbero	LB	28 October 1996 (age 30)	Academy
	Argentina	Lucas Carrizo	DF	20 May 1997 (age 29)	San Telmo
	Argentina	Gabriel Fernández	CB	3 April 1993 (age 33)	Central Córdoba
	Argentina	Lucas Fernández	RB	20 July 1988 (age 38)	Chaco For Ever
	Argentina	Federico Mazur	RB	14 May 1993 (age 33)	Temperley
	Argentina	Alejandro Molina	RB	10 August 1997 (age 29)	San Lorenzo (loan)
	Argentina	Diego Mondino	CB	14 November 1994 (age 31)	Defensores de Belgrano
	Argentina	Renzo Vera	RB	1 June 1983 (age 43)	Patronato
Midfielders
	Argentina	Leandro Becerra	LM	26 January 1984 (age 42)	Central Córdoba
	Argentina	Franco Carrasco	MF	14 September 1995 (age 31)	La Consulta
	Argentina	Lucio Compagnucci	DM	23 February 1996 (age 30)	Real Murcia
	Argentina	Emmanuel García	MF	8 July 1993 (age 33)	Fundación Amigos
	Argentina	Santiago López	MF	4 December 1997 (age 28)	Academia Chacras
	Argentina	Jacobo Mansilla	LM	15 June 1987 (age 39)	Patronato
	Argentina	Sergio Oga	AM	15 September 1981 (age 45)	Central Norte
	Nigeria	Felix Orode	AM	28 July 1990 (age 36)	Defensores de Pronunciamiento
	Argentina	Iván Ramírez	MF	23 February 1990 (age 36)	Flandria
	Argentina	Brian Zabaleta	MF	23 April 1998 (age 28)	Empleados de Comercio
Forwards
	Argentina	Brian Andrada	FW	22 June 1997 (age 29)	Ferro Carril Oeste
	Argentina	Gonzalo Berterame	FW	11 July 1996 (age 30)	San Lorenzo (loan)
	Argentina	Lisandro Cabrera	FW	4 January 1998 (age 28)	Newell's Old Boys (loan)
	Argentina	Tadeo Marchiori	FW	18 October 1999 (age 27)	Academy
	Argentina	Gonzalo Marronkle	CF	14 November 1984 (age 41)	Hồ Chí Minh City
	Argentina	Ignacio Morales	FW	11 February 1998 (age 28)	Academy
	Argentina	Nicolás Romano	FW	5 November 1999 (age 27)	Academy
	Argentina	Luis Salces	LW	25 November 1994 (age 31)	Central Córdoba

== Transfers ==
Domestic transfer windows:
3 July 2019 to 24 September 2019
20 January 2020 to 19 February 2020.

=== Transfers in ===
Date from	Position	Nationality	Name	From	Ref.
4 July 2019	MF	Argentina	Iván Ramírez	Flandria	
7 July 2019	DF	Argentina	Lucas Carrizo	San Telmo	
7 July 2019	RB	Argentina	Renzo Vera	Patronato	
23 July 2019	RB	Argentina	Federico Mazur	Temperley	
25 July 2019	LM	Argentina	Jacobo Mansilla	Patronato	
3 August 2019	FW	Argentina	Gonzalo Berterame	San Lorenzo	
13 August 2019	AM	Nigeria	Felix Orode	Defensores de Pronunciamiento	
14 August 2019	LW	Argentina	Luis Salces	Unattached (Note: Previously played for Central Córdoba (2019).)	
25 August 2019	CF	Argentina	Gonzalo Marronkle	Hồ Chí Minh City	

=== Transfers out ===
Date from	Position	Nationality	Name	To	Ref.
3 July 2019 (Note: Deal agreed on 4 June 2019)	AM	Argentina	Neri Espinosa	Deportivo Maipú	
3 July 2019 (Note: Deal agreed on 13 June 2019)	MF	Argentina	Mateo Ramírez	Guillermo Brown	
3 July 2019 (Note: Deal agreed on 19 June 2019)	LM	Argentina	Gonzalo Bazán	Platense	
3 July 2019 (Note: Deal agreed on 20 June 2019)	AM	Argentina	Lucas Baldunciel	Temperley	
3 July 2019 (Note: Deal agreed on 25 June 2019)	LB	Argentina	Lucas Márquez	Mitre	
3 July 2019 (Note: Deal agreed on 27 June 2019)	CM	Argentina	Diego Auzqui	Mitre	
3 July 2019 (Note: Deal agreed on 30 June 2019)	RM	Argentina	Pablo Cortizo	Patronato	
3 July 2019 (Note: Deal agreed on 1 July 2019)	FW	Argentina	Sebastián Matos	San Martín	
8 July 2019 (Note: Deal agreed on 28 June 2019)	FW	Argentina	Patricio Cucchi	Atlético Nacional	
12 August 2019	CB	Argentina	Stefano Brundo	Atlético de Rafaela	

=== Loans in ===
Start date	Position	Nationality	Name	From	End date	Ref.
3 July 2019 (Note: Deal agreed on 15 June 2019)	CB	Argentina	Brian Alferez	Godoy Cruz	30 June 2020	
12 August 2019	RB	Argentina	Alejandro Molina	San Lorenzo	30 June 2020	
27 August 2019	FW	Argentina	Lisandro Cabrera	Newell's Old Boys	30 June 2020	

== Friendlies ==
=== Pre-season ===
Godoy Cruz of the Primera División were scheduled to be Gimnasia y Esgrima's opening opponents of pre-season. They'd also travel to the Estadio Ingeniero Hilario Sánchez to play San Martín (SJ) and to the El Gigante de Alberdi to face Belgrano.

Win Draw Loss

11 July 2019 Friendly	Gimnasia y Esgrima	1–1	Godoy Cruz	Buenos Aires, Argentina
	N. Romano	Gimnasia y Esgrima; TyC Sports; 40 min. match	R. Prieto	Stadium: CeNARD

11 July 2019 Friendly	Gimnasia y Esgrima	0–1	Godoy Cruz	Buenos Aires, Argentina
		Gimnasia y Esgrima; Diario UNO; 40 min. match	E. Bullaude	Stadium: CeNARD

27 July 2019 Friendly	San Martín (SJ)	1–0	Gimnasia y Esgrima	San Juan, Argentina
	H. Osorio	Gimnasia y Esgrima; Diario La Provincia SJ; 40 min. match		Stadium: Estadio Ingeniero Hilario Sánchez

27 July 2019 Friendly	San Martín (SJ)	3–0	Gimnasia y Esgrima	San Juan, Argentina
	N. Bertocchi; P. Palacios Alvarenga; B. Pereyra	Gimnasia y Esgrima; Diario La Provincia SJ; 40 min. match		Stadium: Estadio Ingeniero Hilario Sánchez

9 August 2019 Friendly	Belgrano	1–1	Gimnasia y Esgrima	Córdoba, Argentina
	P. Vegetti 7'	Gimnasia y Esgrima; Vía País	G. Berterame 73'	Stadium: El Gigante de Alberdi; Referee: Cristián Arregues (Argentina)

9 August 2019 Friendly	Belgrano	2–0	Gimnasia y Esgrima	Córdoba, Argentina
	C. Techera 57'; N. Bertocchi 63'	Gimnasia y Esgrima; Vía País		Stadium: El Gigante de Alberdi; Referee: Lucas Ludueña (Argentina)

== Competitions ==
=== Primera B Nacional ===
==== Results summary ====
Overall								Home						Away					
Pld	W	D	L	GF	GA	GD	Pts	W	D	L	GF	GA	GD	W	D	L	GF	GA	GD
3	1	2	0	1	0	+1	5	0	2	0	0	0	0	1	0	0	1	0	+1

Last updated: 3 September 2019.
Source: Soccerway

==== Matches ====
The fixtures for the 2019–20 league season were announced on 1 August 2019, with a new format of split zones being introduced. Gimnasia y Esgrima were drawn in Zone B.

Win Draw Loss

18 August 2019 1	Gimnasia y Esgrima	0–0	Defensores de Belgrano	Mendoza, Argentina
16:00 GMT-3		El Ciudadano; Soccerway		Stadium: Estadio Víctor Antonio Legrotaglie; Referee: Lucas Comesaña (Argentina)

25 August 2019 2	Almagro	0–1	Gimnasia y Esgrima	José Ingenieros, Argentina
15:30 GMT-3		Gimnasia y Esgrima; El Ciudadano; Soccerway	L. Aguirre 42' (pen.)	Stadium: Estadio Almagro; Referee: Lucas Novelli (Argentina)

2 September 2019 3	Gimnasia y Esgrima	0–0	Quilmes	Mendoza, Argentina
21:05 GMT-3		Los Andes; Soccerway		Stadium: Estadio Víctor Antonio Legrotaglie; Referee: Adrián Franklin (Argentina)

7 September 2019 4	Villa Dálmine	–	Gimnasia y Esgrima	Campana, Argentina
15:30 GMT-3				Stadium: Estadio El Coliseo de Mitre y Puccini

=== Copa Argentina ===
River Plate, of the Primera División, were drawn to play Gimnasia y Esgrima in the Copa Argentina on 16 July, with the round of thirty-two tie scheduled for the Estadio Único in Villa Mercedes, San Luis; at a neutral stadium, as is normal in the competition.

Win Draw Loss

16 July 2019 R32	Gimnasia y Esgrima	1–1 (4–5 p)	River Plate	Villa Mercedes, Argentina
21:10 GMT-3	R. Vera 70'	Gimnasia y Esgrima; Infobae; Soccerway	E. Palacios 66'	Stadium: Estadio Único; Referee: Andrés Merlos (Argentina)
	Penalties
	L. Aguirre (penalty scored); B. Zabaleta (penalty scored); Ta. Marchiori (penalty scored); B. Andrada (penalty missed); L. Carrizo (penalty scored)		I. Fernández (penalty scored); N. De La Cruz (penalty scored); C. Ferreira (penalty scored); R. Borré (penalty scored); B. Rollheiser (penalty scored)

== Squad statistics ==
=== Appearances and goals ===
No.	Pos.	Nationality	Name	League		Cup		League Cup		Continental		Other		Total		Discipline		Ref
No.	Pos.	Nationality	Name	Apps	Goals	Apps	Goals	Apps	Goals	Apps	Goals	Apps	Goals	Apps	Goals	Yellow card	Red card	Ref
–	GK	Argentina	Tomás Giménez	0	0	0	0	—		—		0	0	0	0	0	0	
–	GK	Argentina	Tomás Marchiori	3	0	1	0	—		—		0	0	4	0	0	0	
–	GK	Argentina	Alejo Tello	0	0	0	0	—		—		0	0	0	0	0	0	
–	LB	Argentina	Leandro Aguirre	3	1	1	0	—		—		0	0	4	1	1	0	
–	CB	Argentina	Brian Alferez	3	0	1	0	—		—		0	0	4	0	1	0	
–	LB	Argentina	Miguel Barbero	0	0	0	0	—		—		0	0	0	0	0	0	
–	DF	Argentina	Lucas Carrizo	3	0	1	0	—		—		0	0	4	0	1	0	
–	CB	Argentina	Gabriel Fernández	0	0	0	0	—		—		0	0	0	0	0	0	
–	RB	Argentina	Lucas Fernández	0	0	0	0	—		—		0	0	0	0	0	0	
–	RB	Argentina	Federico Mazur	2(1)	0	0	0	—		—		0	0	2(1)	0	1	0	
–	RB	Argentina	Alejandro Molina	0	0	0	0	—		—		0	0	0	0	0	0	
–	CB	Argentina	Diego Mondino	3	0	1	0	—		—		0	0	4	0	1	0	
–	RB	Argentina	Renzo Vera	3	0	1	1	—		—		0	0	4	1	1	0	
–	MF	Argentina	Franco Carrasco	0(1)	0	1	0	—		—		0	0	1(1)	0	0	0	
–	LM	Argentina	Leandro Becerra	0	0	0	0	—		—		0	0	0	0	0	0	
–	DM	Argentina	Lucio Compagnucci	0	0	0	0	—		—		0	0	0	0	0	0	
–	MF	Argentina	Emmanuel García	0	0	0	0	—		—		0	0	0	0	0	0	
–	MF	Argentina	Santiago López	3	0	1	0	—		—		0	0	4	0	0	0	
–	LM	Argentina	Jacobo Mansilla	0(1)	0	0	0	—		—		0	0	0(1)	0	0	0	
–	AM	Argentina	Sergio Oga	0	0	0	0	—		—		0	0	0	0	0	0	
–	AM	Nigeria	Felix Orode	0	0	0	0	—		—		0	0	0	0	0	0	
–	MF	Argentina	Iván Ramírez	3	0	1	0	—		—		0	0	4	0	3	0	
–	MF	Argentina	Brian Zabaleta	0(2)	0	0(1)	0	—		—		0	0	0(3)	0	0	0	
–	FW	Argentina	Brian Andrada	0	0	0(1)	0	—		—		0	0	0(1)	0	0	0	
–	FW	Argentina	Gonzalo Berterame	3	0	0	0	—		—		0	0	3	0	0	0	
–	FW	Argentina	Lisandro Cabrera	0(1)	0	0	0	—		—		0	0	0(1)	0	0	0	
–	FW	Argentina	Tadeo Marchiori	1	0	0(1)	0	—		—		0	0	1(1)	0	0	0	
–	CF	Argentina	Gonzalo Marronkle	0(1)	0	0	0	—		—		0	0	0(1)	0	0	0	
–	FW	Argentina	Ignacio Morales	3	0	1	0	—		—		0	0	4	0	0	0	
–	FW	Argentina	Nicolás Romano	0	0	1	0	—		—		0	0	1	0	0	0	
–	FW	Argentina	Luis Salces	0(2)	0	0	0	—		—		0	0	0(2)	0	0	0	
Own goals				—	0	—	0	—		—		—	0	—	0	—	—	—
Players who left during the season
–	CB	Argentina	Stefano Brundo	0	0	0	0	—		—		0	0	0	0	0	0	

Statistics accurate as of 4 September 2019.

=== Goalscorers ===
Rank	Pos	No.	Nat	Name	League	Cup	League Cup	Continental	Other	Total	Ref
1	RB	–	Argentina	Renzo Vera	0	1	—	—	0	1	
1	LB	–	Argentina	Leandro Aguirre	1	0	—	—	0	1	
Own goals					0	0	—	—	0	0	
Totals					1	1	—	—	0	2	—
