= Iván Ramírez =

Iván Ramírez may refer to:

- Iván Ramírez (footballer, born 1990), Argentine footballer
- Iván Ramírez (footballer, born 1994), Paraguayan footballer
