= Patricio Cucchi =

Argentine professional footballer

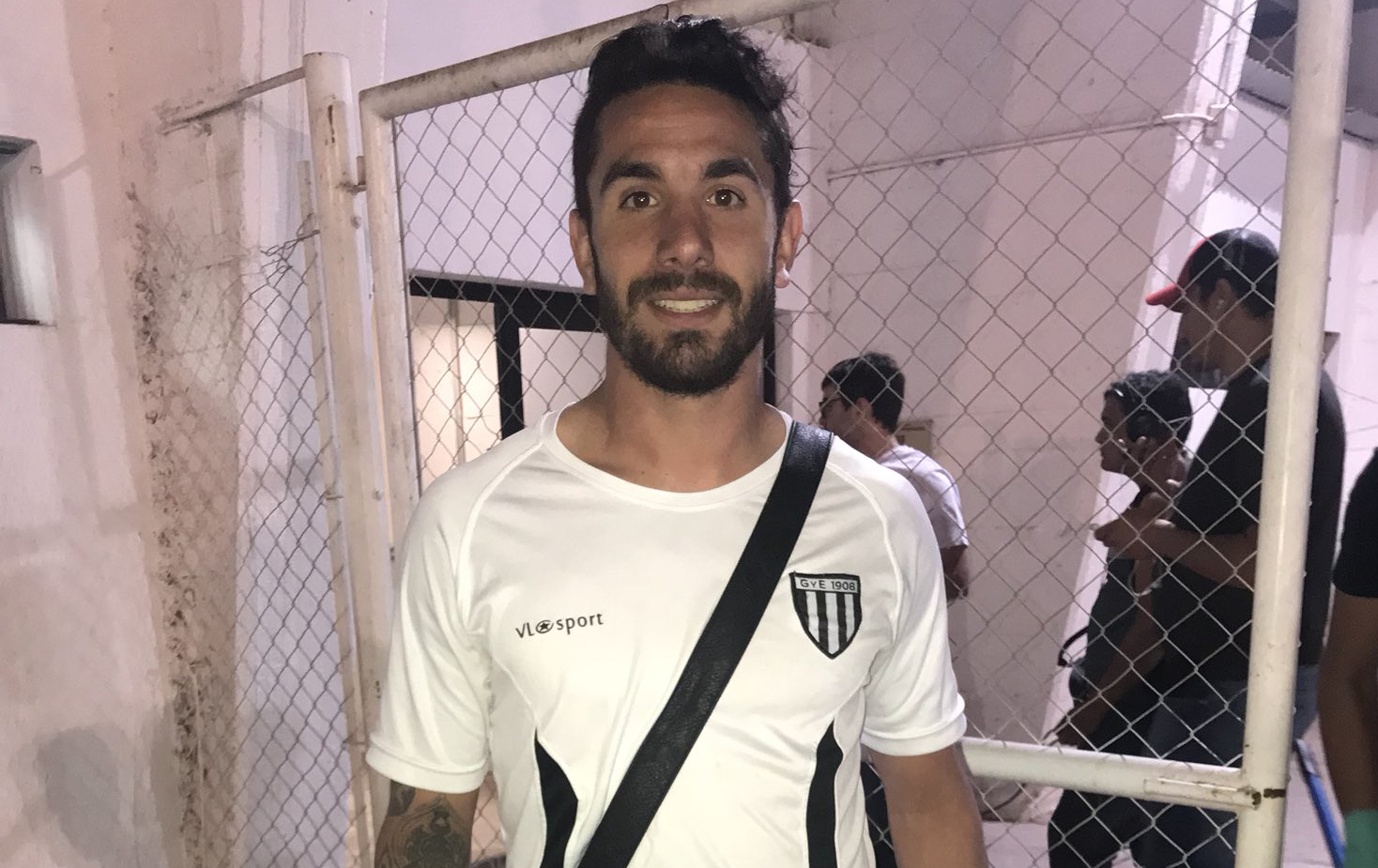

Personal information
- Full name: Patricio Cucchi
- Date of birth: 5 March 1993 (age 33)
- Place of birth: Oliveros, Argentina
- Height: 1.80 m (5 ft 11 in)
- Position: Forward

Team information
- Current team: Guillermo Brown

Youth career
- 2011–2014: Rosario Central

Senior career*
Years	Team	Apps	(Gls)
2014–2015	Rosario Central	0	(0)
2014	→ Tiro Federal (loan)	13	(2)
2015	→ Unión Mar del Plata (loan)	9	(0)
2016	Libertad	16	(6)
2016–2019	Gimnasia y Esgrima (M)	68	(29)
2019–2021	Atlético Nacional	13	(3)
2020	→ Santa Fe (loan)	21	(4)
2021	→ Rosario Central (loan)	5	(0)
2021	→ Sarmiento (loan)	7	(1)
2022	Instituto	29	(2)
2023	Temperley	27	(5)
2024	Agropecuario	30	(8)
2025–2026	Almagro	24	(4)
2026–	Guillermo Brown	0	(0)
- * Club domestic league appearances and goals as of 23:52, 11 March 2026 (UTC)

Patricio Cucchi (born 5 March 1993) is an Argentine professional footballer who plays as a centre-forward for Torneo Federal A club Guillermo Brown.

== Career ==
Cucchi began his career with Rosario Central. In June 2014, Cucchi was loaned to Torneo Federal A's Tiro Federal. He scored twice in his opening five appearances, netting in matches with Libertad and Independiente in September. Upon returning to his parent club, Cucchi soon departed on loan once again by signing with Unión Mar del Plata of Primera B Nacional. His professional bow came on 26 April against Atlético Paraná, with eight more appearances occurring; though just one was a start. January 2016 saw Cucchi join Libertad on a permanent deal. Six goals in 16 encounters followed.

On 30 June 2016, Cucchi completed a move across Torneo Federal A by agreeing to sign for Gimnasia y Esgrima de Mendoza. He made his debut on 11 September versus Sportivo Desamparados, which was the first of 64 games in 2 seasons with the club which culminated with promotion to the second tier in 2017–18. He netted a brace on the opening day in 2018–19 against Temperley. A total of seventeen goals arrived that season in all competitions, with the forward subsequently announcing his intentions to depart at the conclusion of the campaign. A move to Colombia to play for Atlético Nacional was agreed on 28 June. In 2020, Cucchi was loaned out to Independiente Santa Fe for the rest of the year.

== Personal life ==
In May 2019, Cucchi was involved in a minor traffic collision. An accident that forced him to miss subsequent training, though he and the other occupant escaped unharmed.

== Career statistics ==
As of 12 August 2019.

Club statistics
Club	Season	League			Cup		League Cup		Continental		Other		Total	
Club	Season	Division	Apps	Goals	Apps	Goals	Apps	Goals	Apps	Goals	Apps	Goals	Apps	Goals
Rosario Central	2014	Primera División	0	0	0	0	—		0	0	0	0	0	0
Rosario Central	2015	Primera División	0	0	0	0	—		—		0	0	0	0
Rosario Central	Total		0	0	0	0	—		0	0	0	0	0	0
Tiro Federal (loan)	2014	Torneo Federal A	13	2	1	0	—		—		2 (Note: Appearance(s) in the Torneo Federal A play-offs)	0	16	2
Unión Mar del Plata (loan)	2015	Primera B Nacional	9	0	0	0	—		—		0	0	9	0
Libertad	2016	Torneo Federal A	16	6	0	0	—		—		0	0	16	6
Gimnasia y Esgrima	2016–17	Torneo Federal A	19	8	2	0	—		—		5	1	26	9
Gimnasia y Esgrima	2017–18	Torneo Federal A	27	6	6	1	—		—		5	2	37	9
Gimnasia y Esgrima	2018–19	Primera B Nacional	22	15	1	1	—		—		2 (Note: Appearance(s) in the Primera B Nacional play-offs)	1	25	17
Gimnasia y Esgrima	Total		68	29	9	2	—		—		12	4	89	35
Atlético Nacional	2019	Categoría Primera A	2	0	0	0	—		0	0	0	0	2	0
Career total			108	37	10	2	—		0	0	14	4	132	43
