= Emmanuel García =

Emmanuel García may refer to:

- Emmanuel García (footballer, born 1989), Mexican midfielder
- Emmanuel García (footballer, born 1993), Argentine midfielder

== See also ==
- Emmanuel Garcia (born 1986), Canadian baseball player
- Emanuel García (born 1990), Argentine midfielder
