= Tomás Costa =

Argentine footballer

Personal information
- Full name: Tomás Alberto Costa
- Date of birth: 30 January 1985 (age 41)
- Place of birth: Oliveros, Argentina
- Height: 1.86 m (6 ft 1 in)
- Position: Midfielder

Youth career
- 2003–2005: Rosario Central

Senior career*
Years	Team	Apps	(Gls)
2005–2008	Rosario Central	47	(3)
2008–2012	Porto	41	(2)
2010	→ CFR Cluj (loan)	6	(0)
2011	→ Universidad Católica (loan)	17	(2)
2011–2012	→ Colón (loan)	22	(1)
2012–2013	Colón	0	(0)
2012–2013	→ Universidad Católica (loan)	25	(0)
2013–2015	Universidad Católica	65	(4)
2016–2017	Peñarol	15	(1)
2017	Olimpo	10	(0)
2018–2019	Alianza Lima	50	(1)
Total		298	(14)
- * Club domestic league appearances and goals

Tomás Alberto Costa (born 30 January 1985) is an Argentine former professional footballer who played as a central midfielder.

== Club career ==
=== Rosario Central ===
Born in Oliveros, Santa Fe, Costa joined Rosario Central's youth ranks at the age of 18. He made his first-team and Primera División debut in a 1–0 win against Estudiantes de La Plata on 17 September 2006, taking the pitch in the 85th minute. His first start occurred on 1 October in a 1–1 home draw with Godoy Cruz Antonio Tomba.

After of the departure of Néstor Gorosito and the arrival of Carlos Ischia, Costa received more playing time. In the 2007 Clausura he scored his first goal for the side, in a 2–0 victory over Gimnasia y Esgrima de Jujuy on 10 June.

=== Porto ===
On 14 May 2008, Costa was transferred to FC Porto on a five-year contract for a reported fee of €3.2 million. He made his Primeira Liga debut with his new club on 24 August, starting in a 2–0 home defeat of C.F. Os Belenenses and playing 75 minutes. He appeared in all ten games in that season's UEFA Champions League, his first being a 3–1 home win over Fenerbahçe SK. On 3 May 2009, he scored his first goal for the Portuguese in a 3–0 victory at C.S. Marítimo, and finished his debut campaign with 41 appearances in all competitions, including 22 minutes in the final of the Portuguese Cup, in an eventual double.

On 31 August 2010, Costa joined CFR Cluj of Romania. After six Liga I and two Champions League appearances he was recalled by Porto but, in the following transfer window, moved to Club Deportivo Universidad Católica in Chile as a replacement for Al Ain FC-bound Milovan Mirošević, being officially presented on 25 January after agreeing to a six-month loan.

Costa made his official debut against Unión La Calera in a 2–1 Primera División defeat at the Nicolás Chahuán Nazar Municipal Stadium on 12 February 2011, starting the match as right back and being replaced by Santiago Dittborn. On 3 March, he scored a vital long-range goal to help UC to a 4–3 away win against Club Atlético Vélez Sarsfield in the second stage of the Copa Libertadores, the club's first ever away win against an Argentine team in the competition.

On 23 April 2011, Costa netted his first league goal for Universidad Católica after a notable free kick against Cobresal in a 5–3 win; his solid performances overall made him a regular starter in the Juan Antonio Pizzi-led side, which qualified to the 2011 Copa Sudamericana. In the national championship playoffs finals against Club Universidad de Chile, he scored in the first leg in a 2–0 home victory but was sent off in the decider (4–1 loss).

Costa returned to Argentina in July 2011, joining Club Atlético Colón again on loan.

=== Universidad Católica ===
On 6 July 2012, Costa moved back to both Chile and Universidad. He was voted best player in the country at the end of the first season in his second spell.

=== Peñarol ===
In January 2016, Costa signed with Peñarol in the Uruguayan Primera División. On 10 April of the following year, after only 24 competitive appearances, he left.

=== Later years ===
Costa joined Club Olimpo on 19 August 2017, agreeing to a one-year contract. He moved abroad shortly after, however, signing a similar deal with Club Alianza Lima in the Peruvian Primera División.

== Honours ==
Porto

- Primeira Liga: 2008–09
- Taça de Portugal: 2008–09, 2009–10
- Supertaça Cândido de Oliveira: 2009

Peñarol

- Uruguayan Primera División : 2015–16
