= Víctor Legrotaglie =

Argentinian association football player (1937–2024)

Victor Legrotaglie
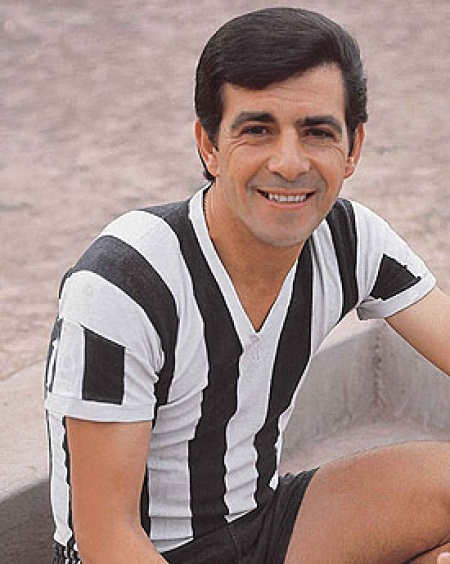
- Legrotaglie in 1971

Personal information
- Full name: Victor Antonio Legrotaglie
- Date of birth: 29 May 1937
- Place of birth: Las Heras, Mendoza, Argentina
- Date of death: 30 March 2024 (aged 86)
- Place of death: Godoy Cruz, Mendoza, Argentina
- Position: Midfielder

Senior career*
Years	Team	Apps	(Gls)
1953–1959	Gimnasia y Esgrima		
1959–1960	Chacarita Juniors		
1960–1963	Gimnasia y Esgrima (M)		
1963–1964	Argentino		
1964–1967	Gimnasia y Esgrima (M)		
1967	Argentino (M)		
1967–1968	Juventud Alianza		
1968–1973	Gimnasia y Esgrima (M)		
1973	Independiente Rivadavia		
1976	Américo Tesorieri		
- * Club domestic league appearances and goals

Víctor Antonio Legrotaglie (29 May 1937 – 30 March 2024) was an Argentine football player and coach. He played as a midfielder, and was the fourth-highest scorer (as of May 2025) from free kicks.

Legrotaglie began his professional career in Gimnasia y Esgrima de Mendoza in 1953, where he became the institution's greatest star. In 1959 he moved to Chacarita Juniors, where he won a second-division national championship. He returned to Mendoza in the mid-1960s. Three years later, he played for Argentino de Mendoza. A year later, he returned to Lobo Mendoza for the third time, staying for three years. During that period, he won an official regional tournament and the unofficial Confraternidad Tournament organized by Boca Juniors in 1965.

In 1967, he briefly returned to the Mendoza Academy but in the middle of that year, he went to the Province of San Juan to play for Juventud Alianza. His fourth stage in Mensana came at the beginning of 1968 when he began to dispute the national championship. In 1973, he played in Independiente Rivadavia —the classic rival of Lobo, but at the time it was customary for Mendoza clubs to borrow players to represent the province at the national level. In 1976, he went to the Province of La Rioja to play in Américo Tesorieri where he ended up retiring professionally a few months later.

He stood out for his free kicks and olympic goals (having scored a total of 66 and 12 respectively). The Gimnasia y Esgrima Stadium was named in his honour.

== Early life ==
Legrotaglie was born in Las Heras, Mendoza on 29 May 1937. He began playing football at Club Sociedad Italiana 5 de Octubre —currently the Vicente Polimeni sports center. The club was founded by his grandfather. His father and uncle later served as club presidents.

== Career ==
=== Early career ===
Legrotaglie came to Gimnasia y Esgrima de Mendoza, by chance, thanks to "Chupino" Carlos Cardone—an acquaintance and a "Lobo" player. At age sixteen he was in the line of substitutes. Twenty minutes into the second half after the injury of one of the forwards, he came in and scored two goals. Turning seventeen, he signed his first professional contract. His family was a fan of Independiente Rivadavia, so he tried to stay there, but was rejected because he weighed only sixty-two kilos.

=== Professional career ===
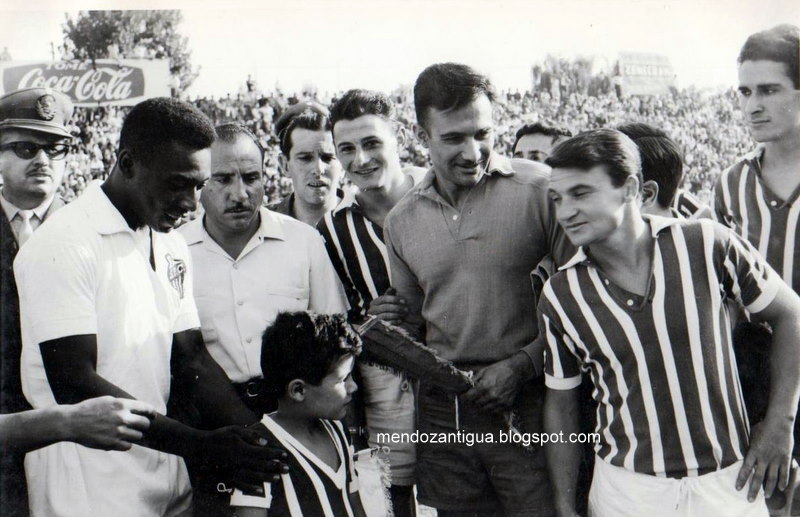
Legrotaglie and Pelé during a friendly match vs Santos FC in 1964

In 1959, he transferred to Chacarita Juniors where he became champion of the Primera B—the second division of Argentine football league system—that year. A year later he returned to Gimnasia y Esgrima where he stayed until 1963 when he was traded to C.A. Argentino. He returned to GyE where he won his first Liga Mendocina title. On 1 March 1964, Legrotaglie played unofficially for Godoy Cruz in a friendly game vs Brazilian side Santos. Santos won 3–2. In 1965 he won the Torneo Confraternidad that offered the possibility of facing Boca Juniors.

In the second half of 1967, after his second stint at the Mendoza Academy, he played for Juventud Alianza, a club in San Juan Province including the 1967 Torneo Regional and Torneo Promocional. During his fourth tenure on GyE, Legrotaglie gained recognition as part of Los Compadres, regarded as the best football team outside Buenos Aires during those years. That squad remained undefeated at home for two years. They qualified for the Nacional championship on three consecutive occasions. In the 1971 Nacional, GyE achieved an outstanding result by beating San Lorenzo de Almagro 5–2 at Estadio Gasómetro. In the next season, GyE defeated Newell's Old Boys, 5–2.

In 1973, he transferred to Independiente Rivadavia to compete in the 1973 Nacional.

Legrotaglie finished his playing career at the end of 1974 in Gimnasia y Esgrima. His "farewell" was on 24 September 1975 in a 1975 Torneo Nacional match v River Plate held in Estadio Bautista Gargantini. Legrotaglie was carried by former teammates and saluted and cheered by the people of Mendoza. He returned to the field 2 years later to play for Club Américo Tesorieri of La Rioja, his last official club.

In 1971 Legrotaglie appeared on the cover of prestigious sports magazine El Gráfico, which described him:

He was a machine of making nutmegs, although his specialty were the Olympic goals (scoring a goal directly from a corner kick): he scored twelve.

— El Gráfico, (January 4, 2008).

He scored a total of 66 goals from free kicks, ranking 4th. among the highest in the history of football.

During Legrotaglie's best years, renowned European clubs such as Real Madrid and Inter Milan or US-based New York Cosmos made attempts to hire him. He preferred to stay at his hometown.

== Manager ==
Legrotaglie coached Gimnasia y Esgrima de Mendoza on several occasions. In 1981, he led the team to the Liga Mendocina championship. Later, he had several internships in regional competitions Torneo Argentino A and Torneo Argentino B.

His last experience at the Lobo del Parque was in 2004, when unexpectedly, Walter De Felippe resigned a few days before his debut.

== Death ==
Legrotaglie died in Godoy Cruz, Mendoza on 30 March 2024, at the age of 86.
