= Ignacio Morales =

Ignacio Morales may refer to:

- Ignacio Morales (taekwondo) (born 1995), Chilean taekwondo athlete
- Ignacio Morales (footballer) (born 1998), Argentine forward
