= Lisandro Cabrera =

Argentine footballer (born 1998)

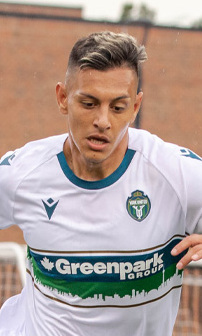
- Cabrera with York United in 2022

Personal information
- Full name: Lisandro Agustín Cabrera
- Date of birth: 4 January 1998 (age 28)
- Place of birth: Quitilipi, Argentina
- Height: 1.82 m (6 ft 0 in)
- Position: Forward

Team information
- Current team: Deportivo Maipú

Youth career
- Juventud Cooperativista
- Boca Juniors
- 2018: Newell's Old Boys

Senior career*
Years	Team	Apps	(Gls)
2018–2020	Newell's Old Boys	4	(0)
2019	→ Cúcuta Deportivo (loan)	7	(1)
2019	→ Patriotas (loan)	0	(0)
2019	→ Gimnasia y Esgrima (loan)	7	(0)
2021–2022	York United	21	(1)
2021	→ Atlético Pantoja (loan)		
2021	→ Guadalupe (loan)	21	(3)
2023–2025	Sol de América	62	(19)
2025–2026	Atlético Tucumán	17	(0)
2026–	Deportivo Maipú	3	(0)
- * Club domestic league appearances and goals as of 18:07, 11 March 2026 (UTC)

Lisandro Agustín Cabrera (born 4 January 1998) is an Argentine professional footballer who plays as a forward for Deportivo Maipú.

== Early life ==
Cabrera was born in the city of Quitilipi in Argentina's northern Chaco Province. Cabrera was signed by Boca Juniors' academy from Juventud Cooperativista, which preceded him joining Newell's Old Boys in 2018.

== Club career ==
=== Newell's Old Boys ===
Having been moved into their senior side in September 2018, Cabrera made his professional debut during a home defeat to Atlético Tucumán on 3 September; he was subbed on for Braian Rivero on seventy-five minutes. Cabrera featured three more times in his opening month in all competitions, prior to starting a Primera División game for the first time on 8 October against Colón.

In January 2019, Cabrera joined Cúcuta Deportivo on loan. He scored vs. Deportivo Pasto on 3 April. In July, having ended his loan with Cúcuta Deportivo in June after thirteen total appearances and a further goal versus Valledupar in the cup, Cabrera returned to Colombia on loan with Patriotas. However, he left weeks later after being told he wasn't going to be selected at first-team level. On 27 August, Cabrera was loaned to Gimnasia y Esgrima back in his homeland.

=== York United ===
On 18 November 2020, Cabrera joined Canadian Premier League club York United. While awaiting his Canadian visa, he was loaned to Atlético Pantoja in the Dominican Republic, with York being able to recall him as soon as his visa was processed. On April 16 Cabrera scored Pantoja's first ever goal in CONCACAF Champions League play against Monterrey. On June 2 he and York teammate and fellow Atletico Pantoja loanee Mateo Hernández were loaned to Costa Rican club Guadalupe of the Liga FPD. In December 2022, Cabrera departed the club, after his 2023 option was declined.

== Career statistics ==
As of 29 September 2020.

Club statistics
Club	Season	League			National Cup		League Cup		Continental		Other		Total	
Club	Season	Division	Apps	Goals	Apps	Goals	Apps	Goals	Apps	Goals	Apps	Goals	Apps	Goals
Newell's Old Boys	2018–19	Primera División	4	0	1	0	—		0	0	0	0	5	0
Newell's Old Boys	2019–20	Primera División	0	0	0	0	—		—		0	0	0	0
Newell's Old Boys	Total		4	0	1	0	—		0	0	0	0	5	0
Cúcuta Deportivo (loan)	2019	Categoría Primera A	7	1	6	1	—		—		0	0	13	2
Patriotas (loan)	2019	Categoría Primera A	0	0	0	0	—		—		0	0	0	0
Gimnasia y Esgrima (loan)	2019–20	Primera B Nacional	7	0	0	0	—		—		0	0	7	0
York United	2021	Canadian Premier League	0	0	0	0	—		—		0	0	0	0
Atlético Pantoja	2021	Liga Dominicana de Fútbol	?	?	?	?	—		2	1	0	0	2	1
Career total			18	1	7	1	—		2	1	0	0	27	3
