= Jacobo Mansilla =

Argentine footballer

Personal information
- Full name: Jacobo Guillermo Mansilla
- Date of birth: June 15, 1987 (age 39)
- Place of birth: Castelli, Argentina
- Height: 1.78 m (5 ft 10 in)
- Position: Left winger

Team information
- Current team: Brown de Adrogué

Youth career
- Independiente

Senior career*
Years	Team	Apps	(Gls)
2006–2008	Independiente II		
2008–2010	Brown de Adrogué		
2010–2011	Defensores Belgrano		
2011–2013	Quilmes	65	(7)
2013–2014	Colón	34	(1)
2014–2017	Olimpo	62	(3)
2017	Newell's Old Boys	9	(0)
2017–2018	Tigre	14	(1)
2018	San Luis	12	(0)
2019	Patronato	6	(0)
2019–2020	Gimnasia Mendoza	8	(1)
2020–	Brown de Adrogué	42	(1)
- * Club domestic league appearances and goals as of 21:44, 8 December 2019 (UTC)

Jacobo Mansilla (born June 15, 1987) is an Argentine footballer who plays as a midfielder for Brown de Adrogué

Mansilla made his league debut as a substitute against Gimnasia y Esgrima de Jujuy on June 16, 2007, when he came on as a stoppage-time substitute in a meaningless last game of the season fixture.
