= Brian Zabaleta =

Argentine professional footballer

Personal information
- Date of birth: 23 April 1998 (age 28)
- Place of birth: Argentina
- Position: Midfielder

Team information
- Current team: Gimnasia y Esgrima

Youth career
- Empleados de Comercio
- Lanús
- Gimnasia y Esgrima

Senior career*
Years	Team	Apps	(Gls)
2019–	Gimnasia y Esgrima	1	(0)
- * Club domestic league appearances and goals as of 11:11, 8 April 2019 (UTC)

Brian Zabaleta (born 23 April 1998) is an Argentine professional footballer who plays as a midfielder for Gimnasia y Esgrima.

== Career ==
Zabaleta, who also had youth stints with Empleados de Comercio and Lanús, began his senior career in Primera B Nacional with Gimnasia y Esgrima; with his breakthrough arriving in 2019. After being an unused substitute for a fixture with Defensores de Belgrano on 31 March, Zabaleta made his senior debut in a victory away to their Jujuy namesakes on 7 April; he was substituted on for Diego Auzqui with eighty minutes played.

== Career statistics ==
As of 8 April 2019.

Appearances and goals by club, season and competition
Club	Season	League			Cup		Continental		Other		Total	
Club	Season	Division	Apps	Goals	Apps	Goals	Apps	Goals	Apps	Goals	Apps	Goals
Gimnasia y Esgrima	2018–19	Primera B Nacional	1	0	0	0	—		0	0	1	0
Career total			1	0	0	0	—		0	0	1	0
