= Estadio Víctor Legrotaglie =

Football stadium in Mendoza, Argentina

Víctor Legrotaglie Stadium
- Estadio Víctor Legrottaglie
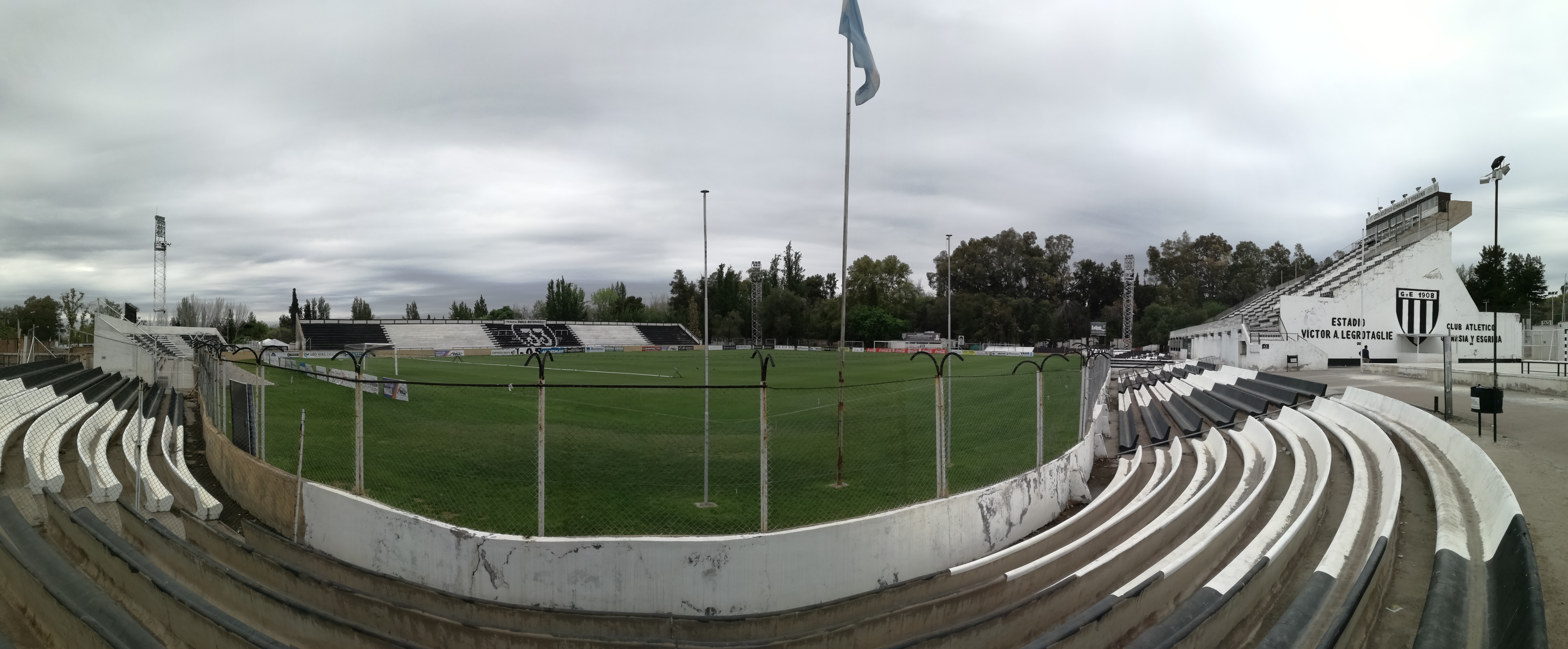
- Panoramic side view of the Victor Antonio Legrotaglie Stadium in 2017.
- Interactive map of Víctor Legrotaglie Stadium
- Address: Mendoza; Argentina
- Coordinates: 32.8842°S 68.8636°W
- Owner: Club Gimnasia y Esgrima (M)
- Capacity: 11,000
- Type: Stadium
- Surface: Grass
- Field size: 100 x 68 m

Construction
- Opened: 25 March 1934; 92 years ago
- Renovated: 2011

Tenant
- Gimnasia y Esgrima (M) (1934–present)

Estadio Víctor Antonio Legrotaglie is a football stadium located at the General San Martín Park in the city of Mendoza of the homonymous province, Argentina.

Inaugurated in 1934, the stadium is owned and operated by club Club Gimnasia y Esgrima and has a capacity of 11,000 spectators being one of the largest stadiums in the province after Estadio Malvinas Argentinas (42,000), Estadio Bautista Gargantini (24,000), and Estadio Feliciano Gambarte (17,000).

The venue was named after Víctor Legrotaglie, former player and manager of Gimnasia y Esgrima and largely regarded as the greatest idol in club's history.

== History ==
The stadium was inaugurated on 25 March 1934 in a friendly match between Gimnasia y Esgrima and its counterpart from Santa Fe. The match ended 22 and had an attendance of 20,000 (the stadium has a larger capacity by then).

In 1936 and 1937, the stadium hosted the Fiesta Nacional de la Vendimia (Grape Harvest National Festival), one of the most important festivals in the country organised once a year.

During the tenure of Pablo Antonicelli (elected president of the club in 1962), a new grandstand on the east side was built. In 1989 it was named after him.

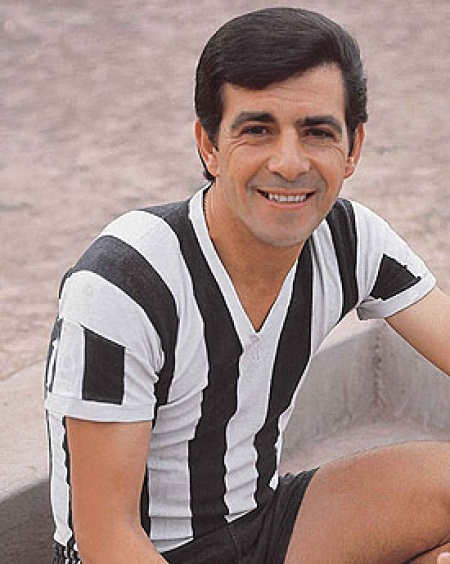
The stadium was named after Víctor Legrotaglie (pictured), the greatest idol of Gimnasia y Esgrima

In 1975, the stadium was named "Víctor Legrotaglie" to honor the footballer that played several tenures for Gimnasia y Esgrima (alternating with other clubs) between 1953 and 1974. Legrotaglie was a skilled midfielder remembered by his free kick goals (scored 66 in his career) and Olympic goals (scored 12)., Legrotaglie is considered the greatest idol in the history of the club.

The venue was the first to have a lighting system all around Mendoza province. It was inaugurated on 13 February 1943 in a match v Lanús (tied 1–1). The system was then modernised and reinaugurated in January 2009 in a friendly vs. Sanjuanino club Sportivo Del Bono.

The stadium after 2011 refurbishments

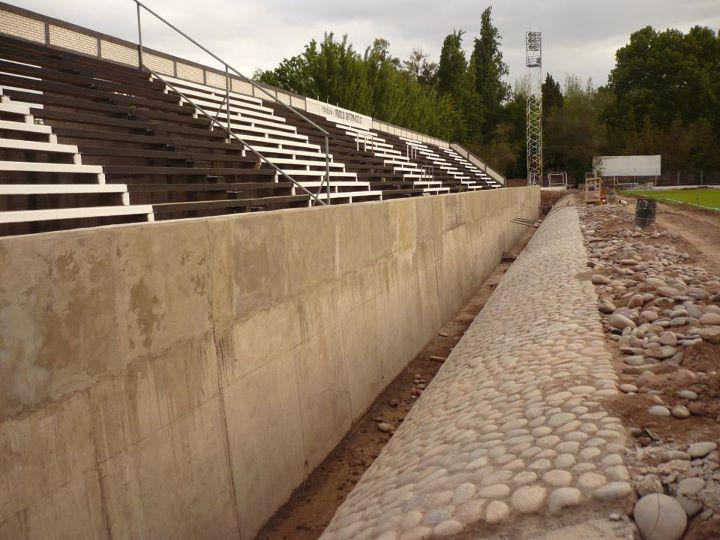
Pit

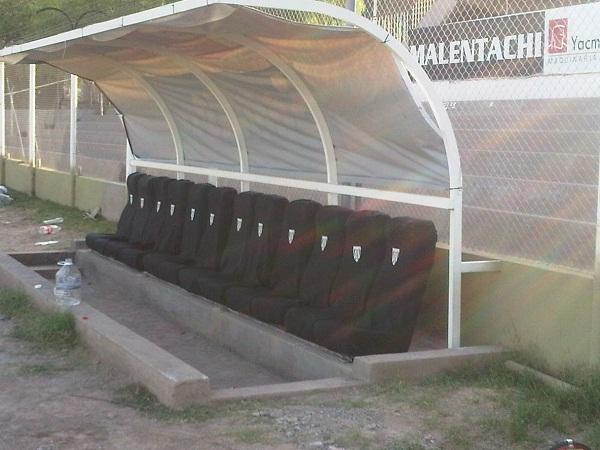
Substitutes bench

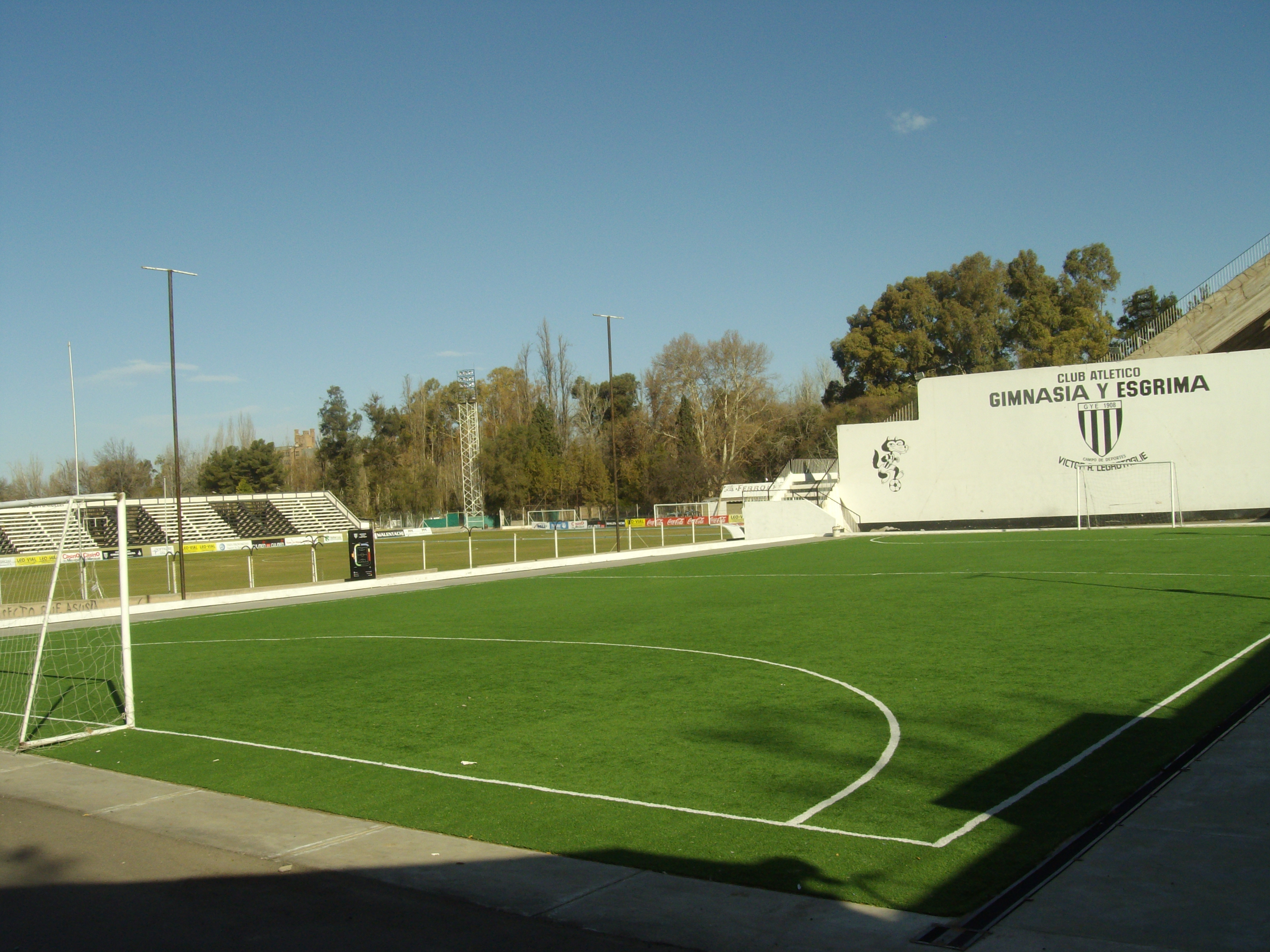
Auxiliary field

The stadium was refurbished in 2011. Works included the construction of a gym under the west stalls, a pit surrounding the pitch (which allowed to removed the fence), plantation of grass, painting of stands and exterior walls. Other sectors refurbished were the toilettes, substitute players bench while an auxiliary field with artificial turf was built. Besides, an access on Avenida del Libertador was opened to avoid brawls between visitor and home supporters.

Once the refurbishments were completed, the stadium was reinaugurated in January 2012 when GyE defeated Sportivo del Bono 5–0 in the 2011–12 Torneo Argentino B.

The stalls on the west side were expanded and remodelled, being reinaugurated in March 2015. The sector was named "Juan Gilberto Funes" in honor of the former player of the club that had a successful tenure on the River Plate team that won the 1986 Copa Libertadores and 1986 Intercontinental Cup. Funes died in 1992 from a heart attack caused by an aortic regurgitation. He was 28 years old.

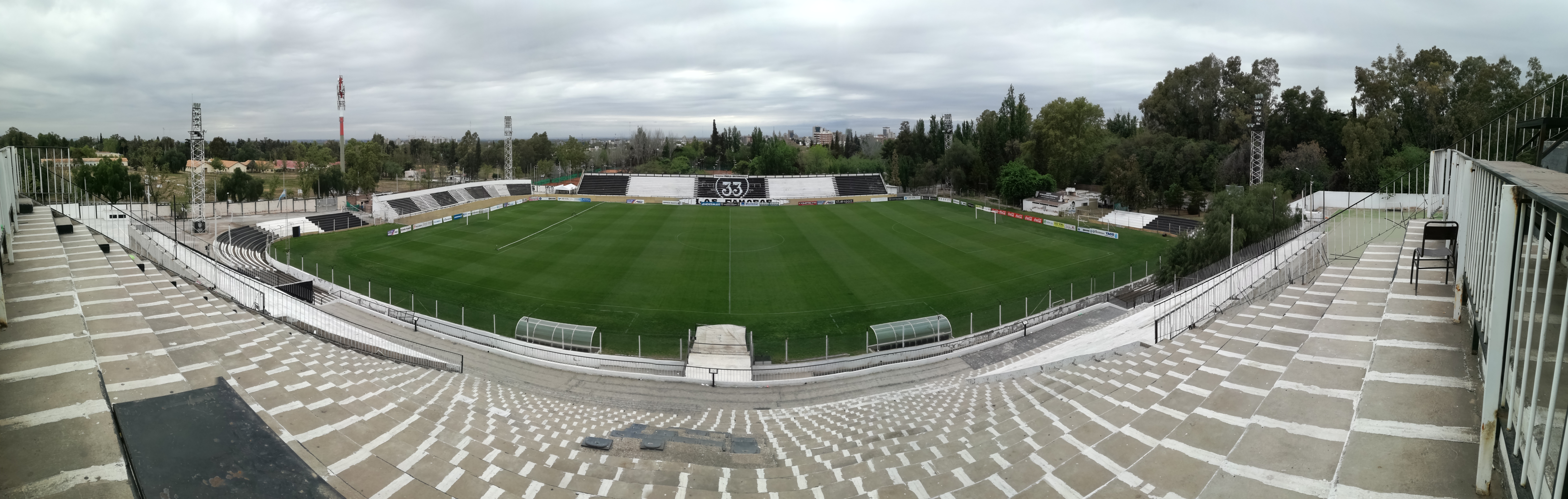
Panoramic view of the stadium in 2017
