= Lucas Carrizo =

Argentine footballer

Personal information
- Full name: Lucas Eduardo Carrizo
- Date of birth: 20 June 1997 (age 29)
- Place of birth: San Miguel de Tucumán, Argentina
- Height: 1.80 m (5 ft 11 in)
- Position: Centre-back

Team information
- Current team: Newell's Old Boys
- Number: 16

Youth career
- Quilmes

Senior career*
Years	Team	Apps	(Gls)
2017–2018	Quilmes	4	(0)
2018–2019	San Telmo	35	(1)
2019–2024	Gimnasia Mendoza	45	(4)
2022–2023	→ Huracán (loan)	32	(0)
2024–2026	Huracán	49	(2)
2026–	Newell's Old Boys	1	(0)
- * Club domestic league appearances and goals as of 16:48, 16 August 2026 (UTC)

Lucas Eduardo Carrizo (born 20 May 1997) is an Argentine footballer who plays as a centre-back for Newell's Old Boys.

== Career ==
Carrizo came through the youth setup at Quilmes, where he made his debut on 10 May 2017 in the Copa Argentina in a penalty shootout loss to Gimnasia Mendoza. On 17 July 2018, he signed for Primera B Metropolitana club San Telmo. He scored his first goal for the club on 29 April 2019 in a 2–1 win against Estudiantes BA.

On 7 July 2019, he signed for Primera Nacional club Gimnasia Mendoza. In August 2020, he signed a new contract until June 2023. On April 8 2021, he scored the winning goal in a 2–1 win against Alvarado. He returned to the Liga Profesional in 2022 as he joined Huracán on loan. After the 2023 season ended, he signed for the club permanently. On 13 April 2024, he scored twice in a 4–0 win against Atlético Tucumán. On 29 October, the club confirmed that Carrizo suffered an anterior cruciate ligament injury in a match against Central Córdoba SdE. He made his return in a reserve game on 20 May 2025.

== Career statistics ==
As of 17 February 2026

Appearances and goals by club, season and competition
Club	Season	League			Cup (Note: Includes Copa Argentina)		Continental		Other		Total	
Club	Season	Division	Goals	Apps	Apps	Goals	Apps	Goals	Apps	Goals	Apps	Goals
Quilmes	2016–17	Liga Profesional	4	0	1	0	—		—		5	0
Quilmes	2017–18	Primera Nacional	0	0	0	0	—		—		0	0
San Telmo	2018–19	Primera B Metropolitana	35	1	0	0	—		—		35	1
Gimnasia Mendoza	2019–20	Primera Nacional	13	1	1	0	—		—		14	1
Gimnasia Mendoza	2020	Primera Nacional	7	1	0	0	—		—		7	1
Gimnasia Mendoza	2021	Primera Nacional	25	2	0	0	—		—		25	2
Gimnasia Mendoza	Total		45	4	1	0	0	0	0	0	46	4
Huracán (loan)	2022	Liga Profesional	10	0	0	0	—		—		10	0
Huracán (loan)	2023	Liga Profesional	22	0	4	1	4 (Note: One appearance in Copa Libertadores, three appearances in Copa Sudamericana)	0	—		30	1
Huracán	2024	Liga Profesional	30	2	4	0	—		—		34	2
Huracán	2025	Liga Profesional	3	0	1	0	2 (Note: Appearances in Copa Sudamericana)	0	—		6	0
Huracán	2026	Liga Profesional	4	0	0	0	—		—		4	0
Huracán	Huracán Total		69	2	9	1	6	0	0	0	84	3
Career total			153	7	11	1	6	0	0	0	170	8
