= Luis Salces =

Argentine footballer

Personal information
- Date of birth: 25 November 1994 (age 31)
- Place of birth: San Salvador de Jujuy, Argentina
- Height: 1.71 m (5 ft 7 1/2 in)
- Position: Forward

Team information
- Current team: Gimnasia y Esgrima (M)

Senior career*
Years	Team	Apps	(Gls)
2013–2018	Gimnasia y Esgrima (J)	101	(4)
2018	Apollon Smyrnis	0	(0)
2019	Central Córdoba	2	(0)
2019–	Gimnasia y Esgrima (M)	8	(0)
- * Club domestic league appearances and goals as of 12:29, 6 October 2020 (UTC)

Luis Salces (born 25 November 1994) is an Argentine professional footballer who plays as a forward for Gimnasia y Esgrima (M).

== Career ==
Salces spent the first five years of his career with Gimnasia y Esgrima (J). He was an unused substitute twice during the 2012–13 Primera B Nacional campaign, before featuring seventeen times in the following season; including his debut against Huracán on 17 August 2013. In February 2016, Salces scored for the first time in a match with Almagro. He left at the end of 2017–18, after achieving one hundred and six appearances in all competitions whilst netting four times. On 12 July 2018, Salces joined Super League Greece side Apollon Smyrnis. He suffered an epileptic seizure in training weeks later.

Apollon released Salces in December, prior to his arrival at Central Córdoba back in Argentina on 25 January 2019. He appeared four times off the bench as the club secured promotion from Primera B Nacional to the Primera División via the play-offs. Salces would soon depart though, as the forward agreed terms to remain in the second tier with Gimnasia y Esgrima (M). He made his debut on 18 August in a goalless draw at home to Defensores de Belgrano.

== Career statistics ==
As of 6 October 2020.

Club statistics
Club	Season	League			Cup		League Cup		Continental		Other		Total	
Club	Season	Division	Apps	Goals	Apps	Goals	Apps	Goals	Apps	Goals	Apps	Goals	Apps	Goals
Gimnasia y Esgrima (J)	2012–13	Primera B Nacional	0	0	0	0	—		—		0	0	0	0
Gimnasia y Esgrima (J)	2013–14	Primera B Nacional	16	0	1	0	—		—		0	0	17	0
Gimnasia y Esgrima (J)	2014	Primera B Nacional	17	0	0	0	—		—		2 (Note: Appearance(s) in the Primera B Nacional play-offs)	0	19	0
Gimnasia y Esgrima (J)	2015	Primera B Nacional	18	0	1	0	—		—		0	0	19	0
Gimnasia y Esgrima (J)	2016	Primera B Nacional	12	2	1	0	—		—		0	0	13	2
Gimnasia y Esgrima (J)	2016–17	Primera B Nacional	18	1	0	0	—		—		0	0	18	1
Gimnasia y Esgrima (J)	2017–18	Primera B Nacional	20	1	0	0	—		—		0	0	20	1
Gimnasia y Esgrima (J)	Total		101	4	3	0	—		—		2	0	106	4
Apollon Smyrnis	2018–19	Super League Greece	0	0	0	0	—		—		0	0	0	0
Central Córdoba	2018–19	Primera B Nacional	2	0	0	0	—		—		2	0	4	0
Gimnasia y Esgrima (M)	2019–20	Primera B Nacional	8	0	0	0	—		—		0	0	8	0
Career total			111	4	3	0	—		—		4	0	118	4
