= Tomás Ortiz =

Argentine professional footballer

Personal information
- Full name: Tomás Facundo Mariano Ortiz
- Date of birth: 10 March 2000 (age 26)
- Place of birth: Florencio Varela, Argentina
- Height: 1.85 m (6 ft 1 in)
- Position: Attacking midfielder

Team information
- Current team: Gimnasia Mendoza (on loan from Defensa y Justicia)
- Number: 20

Youth career
- Defensa y Justicia

Senior career*
| Years | Team | Apps | (Gls) |
| 2018– | Defensa y Justicia | 10 | (0) |
| 2022 | → Cobreloa (loan) | 13 | (0) |
| 2024 | → Arsenal Sarandí (loan) | 32 | (3) |
| 2025 | → Chacarita Juniors (loan) | 26 | (1) |
| 2026– | → Gimnasia Mendoza (loan) | 1 | (0) |
- * Club domestic league appearances and goals as of 16:40, 10 May 2026 (UTC)

Tomás Facundo Mariano Ortiz (born 10 March 2000) is an Argentine professional footballer who plays as an attacking midfielder for Gimnasia Mendoza, on loan from Defensa y Justicia.

== Career ==
Ortiz came through the youth ranks at Defensa y Justicia. His first appearance in a first-team squad arrived in December 2018 against Huracán under manager Sebastián Beccacece, though the attacking midfielder wouldn't be substituted on in the away Primera División draw. He soon returned to their academy, with Hernán Crespo reintegrating him into the senior set-up in late-2020. After going unused on the bench versus Colón on 21 November in the Copa de la Liga Profesional, Ortiz made his debut on 29 November in a 3–2 home defeat to Central Córdoba; starting the match, before being subbed for Jonathan Farías.

On 7 January 2022, Ortiz joined Chilean Primera B de Chile club C.D. Cobreloa.

== Career statistics ==
As of 4 December 2020.

Appearances and goals by club, season and competition
| Club | Season | League | | | Cup | | League Cup | | Continental | | Other | | Total | |
| Club | Season | Division | Apps | Goals | Apps | Goals | Apps | Goals | Apps | Goals | Apps | Goals | Apps | Goals |
|---|---|---|---|---|---|---|---|---|---|---|---|---|---|---|
| Defensa y Justicia | 2018–19 | Primera División | 0 | 0 | 0 | 0 | 0 | 0 | 0 | 0 | 0 | 0 | 0 | 0 |
| Defensa y Justicia | 2019–20 | Primera División | 0 | 0 | 0 | 0 | 0 | 0 | 0 | 0 | 0 | 0 | 0 | 0 |
| Defensa y Justicia | 2020–21 (Note: Soccerway counts Copa de la Liga Profesional appearances as league appearances.) | Primera División | 1 | 0 | 0 | 0 | 0 | 0 | 0 | 0 | 0 | 0 | 1 | 0 |
| Career total | | | 1 | 0 | 0 | 0 | 0 | 0 | 0 | 0 | 0 | 0 | 1 | 0 |
