= Sebastián Matos =

Argentine footballer

Personal information
- Date of birth: 19 September 1984 (age 42)
- Place of birth: Castelli, Argentina
- Height: 1.89 m (6 ft 2 in)
- Position: Forward

Team information
- Current team: Comunicaciones

Youth career
- Brown de Adrogue

Senior career*
Years	Team	Apps	(Gls)
2006	Brown de Adrogue	25	(5)
2006–2007	Comunicaciones	35	(16)
2007–2008	Chacarita Juniors	5	(0)
2008	Huachipato	10	(0)
2008–2009	Atlanta	38	(13)
2009–2010	Dorados de Sinaloa	15	(2)
2010	Los Andes	8	(0)
2010–2012	Barracas Central	63	(21)
2012–2014	Platense	66	(12)
2014–2015	Nueva Chicago	18	(3)
2015	Atlético Tucumán	17	(1)
2016	Almirante Brown	22	(4)
2017–2018	Flandria	41	(14)
2018–2019	Gimnasia Mendoza	21	(3)
2019–2020	San Martín Tucumán	3	(0)
2020–2021	Nueva Chicago	12	(3)
2022–	Comunicaciones	13	(6)
- * Club domestic league appearances and goals as of 17:59, 8 June 2022 (UTC)

Sebastián Matos (born 19 September 1984 in Castelli, Argentina) is an Argentine footballer who pays for Comunicaciones.

== Club career ==
Matos joined Barracas Central from Los Andes in 2010.
