= Sergio Oga =

Argentine footballer

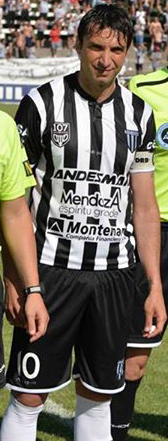

Personal information
- Full name: Sergio Matías Oga
- Date of birth: 15 September 1981 (age 45)
- Place of birth: Córdoba, Argentina
- Position: Midfielder

Team information
- Current team: Gimnasia y Esgrima

Senior career*
Years	Team	Apps	(Gls)
- Club Atlético Las Flores
2003–2006	General Paz Juniors	86	(17)
2006–2007	San Martín	22	(1)
2007–2009	Central Córdoba	53	(14)
2009–2013	Central Norte		
2011–2012	→ Sportivo Desamparados (loan)	9	(1)
2013–2016	Gimnasia y Esgrima	70	(15)
2016	Central Norte		
2016–	Gimnasia y Esgrima	30	(7)
- * Club domestic league appearances and goals as of 15:37, 18 January 2019 (UTC)

Sergio Matías Oga (born 15 September 1981) is an Argentine professional footballer who plays as a midfielder for Gimnasia y Esgrima.

== Career ==
General Paz Juniors were Oga's second team, they signed him from Club Atlético Las Flores. He featured for the Torneo Argentino A side eighty-six times whilst netting seventeen goals. In 2006, San Martín of Primera B Nacional completed the signing of Oga. He scored one goal for them across the 2006–07 campaign, which preceded him departing to join Central Córdoba in 2007. Six goals in twenty-nine matches followed in Torneo Argentino B, with them winning promotion to tier three. Having netted eight times in the subsequent Torneo Argentino A campaign, Oga left to sign for Central Norte in 2009.

Oga spent a total of four seasons with Central Norte in Torneo Argentino B and Torneo Argentino A, though one of which was spent out on loan with Sportivo Desamparados for the 2011–12 Primera B Nacional. He scored and was sent off in his final match for Sportivo Desamparados on 23 June 2012, receiving a second yellow card seconds after netting the winner in a 3–2 victory over Rosario Central on the final day as relegation was confirmed. On 26 July 2013, Oga returned to tier four by agreeing a move to Gimnasia y Esgrima. The club then won consecutive promotions up to Primera B Nacional.

Gimnasia y Esgrima were relegated at the end of 2015, though Oga ended it with twenty-eight appearances and goals versus Los Andes, Boca Unidos and Villa Dálmine. He departed on 20 January 2016 for a short stint back with Central Norte - where he took his overall tally for the club to nineteen goals in one hundred and four encounters - prior to rejoining Gimnasia y Esgrima in June. Oga won promotion for the fourth time in his career at the conclusion of 2017–18, after they eliminated Defensores de Belgrano in the promotion play-off finals.

== Career statistics ==
As of 18 January 2019.

Club statistics
Club	Season	League			Cup		Continental		Other		Total	
Club	Season	Division	Apps	Goals	Apps	Goals	Apps	Goals	Apps	Goals	Apps	Goals
San Martín	2006–07	Primera B Nacional	22	1	0	0	—		0	0	22	1
Central Córdoba	2007–08	Torneo Argentino B	29	6	0	0	—		0	0	29	6
Central Córdoba	2008–09	Torneo Argentino A	24	8	0	0	—		0	0	24	8
Central Córdoba	Total		53	14	0	0	—		0	0	53	14
Central Norte	2010–11	Torneo Argentino A	37	6	0	0	—		0	0	37	6
Central Norte	2011–12	Torneo Argentino A	0	0	0	0	—		0	0	0	0
Central Norte	2012–13	Torneo Argentino A	20	2	2	1	—		0	0	22	3
Central Norte	Total		57	8	2	1	—		0	0	59	9
Sportivo Desamparados (loan)	2011–12	Primera B Nacional	9	1	1	0	—		0	0	10	1
Gimnasia y Esgrima	2013–14	Torneo Argentino B	31	8	0	0	—		0	0	31	8
Gimnasia y Esgrima	2014	Torneo Federal A	12	4	0	0	—		6 (Note: Appearance(s) in the Torneo Federal A play-offs)	2	18	6
Gimnasia y Esgrima	2015	Primera B Nacional	27	3	0	0	—		1 (Note: Appearance(s) in the Primera B Nacional play-offs)	0	28	3
Gimnasia y Esgrima	2016–17	Torneo Federal A	18	4	2	0	—		5	0	25	4
Gimnasia y Esgrima	2017–18	Torneo Federal A	7	3	2	0	—		4	0	13	3
Gimnasia y Esgrima	2018–19	Primera B Nacional	5	0	0	0	—		0	0	5	0
Gimnasia y Esgrima	Total		100	22	4	0	—		16	2	120	24
Career total			241	45	7	1	—		16	2	264	48

== Honours ==
Gimnasia y Esgrima

- Torneo Argentino B: 2013–14
