= Tomás Giménez =

Argentine professional footballer

Personal information
- Full name: Tomás Giménez Behr
- Date of birth: 29 October 1998 (age 28)
- Place of birth: Mendoza, Argentina
- Height: 1.86 m (6 ft 1 in)
- Position: Goalkeeper

Team information
- Current team: Colón (on loan from Gimnasia de Mendoza)

Youth career
- Gimnasia de Mendoza

Senior career*
Years	Team	Apps	(Gls)
2018–	Gimnasia de Mendoza	43	(0)
2023	→ Deportes Antofagasta (loan)	34	(0)
2024–	→ Colón (loan)	19	(0)
- * Club domestic league appearances and goals as of 18:17, 20 March 2026 (UTC)

Tomás Giménez Behr (born 29 October 1998) is an Argentine professional footballer who plays as a goalkeeper for Colón, on loan from Gimnasia y Esgrima de Mendoza.

== Club career ==
Giménez was promoted into Gimnasia y Esgrima's first-team squad during the 2018–19 Primera B Nacional campaign, with the goalkeeper initially being an unused substitute thirteen times; as well as twice in the Copa Argentina. His professional debut arrived on 6 May 2019 in a 1–1 home draw with Almagro in the promotion play-offs, as he came off the substitutes bench in place of Tomás Marchiori at the interval.

== International career ==
In March 2017, Giménez was called up by Claudio Úbeda's Argentina U20s to train in preparation for that year's FIFA U-20 World Cup.

== Career statistics ==
As of 17 December 2023.

Appearances and goals by club, season and competition
Club	Division	League			Cup		Continental		Total	
Club	Division	Season	Apps	Goals	Apps	Goals	Apps	Goals	Apps	Goals
Gimnasia de Mendoza	Primera B Nacional	2018-19	2	0	0	0	—		2	0
Gimnasia de Mendoza	Primera B Nacional	2019-20	0	0	—		—		0	0
Gimnasia de Mendoza	Primera B Nacional	2020	8	0	—		—		8	0
Gimnasia de Mendoza	Primera B Nacional	2021	6	0	—		—		6	0
Gimnasia de Mendoza	Primera B Nacional	2022	27	0	0	0	—		27	0
Gimnasia de Mendoza	Total		43	0	0	0	0	0	43	0
Deportes Antofagasta	Primera B de Chile	2023	34	0	—		—		34	0
Colón	Primera B Nacional	2024	0	0	0	0	—		0	0
Career total			77	0	0	0	0	0	77	0
