= Neri Espinosa =

Argentine professional footballer

Personal information
- Full name: Neri Alberto Espinosa
- Date of birth: 4 July 1986 (age 40)
- Place of birth: La Llave, Argentina
- Height: 1.72 m (5 ft 7 1/2 in)
- Position: Midfielder

Senior career*
Years	Team	Apps	(Gls)
2002–2004	San Martín		
2005–2006	Villa Atuel	15	(0)
2007–2008	Sportivo Pedal		
2010	Gimnasia y Esgrima (LP)	0	(0)
2010–2011	Gimnasia y Esgrima (CdU)	6	(0)
2012–2013	Pacífico	30	(4)
2013–2019	Gimnasia y Esgrima (M)	110	(5)
2019–2021	Deportivo Maipú	2	(0)
2021	Gimnasia y Esgrima (M)		(0)
2021–2022	Arg.Alvear		(0)
2022–2023	Club Ciudad de Bolívar		(0)
2024	Club San Martin de Monte Comán		(0)
- * Club domestic league appearances and goals as of 13:20, 8 January 2026 (UTC)

Neri Alberto Espinosa (born 4 July 1986) is an Argentine professional exfootballer who played as a midfielder.

== Career ==
Espinosa played for San Martín of Monte Comán, before appearing in fifteen fixtures with Villa Atuel in the 2005–06 Torneo Argentino B season. After periods with Sportivo Pedal and La Plata's Gimnasia y Esgrima, Espinosa joined their namesakes from Concepción del Uruguay. Six appearances followed in Torneo Argentino A. 2012 saw Espinosa drop back down to the fourth tier with Pacífico, subsequently netting four goals across thirty games. In 2013, Espinosa completed a move to Mendoza's Gimnasia y Esgrima. He won consecutive promotions as they rose from Torneo Argentino B to Primera B Nacional.

In pro football, Espinosa scored against Instituto and Juventud Unida but it wasn't enough as they suffered relegation to tier three. Gimnasia y Esgrima were promoted back up three campaigns later, with the midfielder taking his statistical tally to one hundred and twenty-eight matches and five goals in the process.

== Personal life ==
In December 2015, Espinosa was involved in a fatal road traffic collision. He was travelling to his father's house when he collided with a motorcycle that was carrying two people, one of whom was driver Jorge Alberto Magallanes, 22, who died instantaneously while passenger Joel Cáceres, 19, suffered multiple injuries. In 2018, Espinosa was charged with culpable homicide by judge María Eugenia Laigle after it was determined Espinosa was not under the influence or excessively speeding at the time of the accident, as well as the fact he had no criminal history. He was handed a two-year suspended jail sentence and banned from driving for five years.

== Career statistics ==
As of 17 January 2019.

Club statistics
Club	Season	League			Cup		Continental		Other		Total	
Club	Season	Division	Apps	Goals	Apps	Goals	Apps	Goals	Apps	Goals	Apps	Goals
Villa Atuel	2005–06	Torneo Argentino B	15	0	0	0	—		0	0	15	0
Gimnasia y Esgrima (LP)	2009–10	Primera División	0	0	0	0	—		0	0	0	0
Gimnasia y Esgrima (CdU)	2010–11	Torneo Argentino A	6	0	0	0	—		0	0	6	0
Pacífico	2012–13	Torneo Argentino B	30	4	0	0	—		0	0	30	4
Gimnasia y Esgrima (M)	2013–14	Torneo Argentino B	19	1	0	0	—		0	0	19	1
Gimnasia y Esgrima (M)	2014	Torneo Federal A	3	0	1	0	—		4 (Note: Appearance(s) in the Torneo Federal A play-offs)	0	8	0
Gimnasia y Esgrima (M)	2015	Primera B Nacional	31	2	0	0	—		1 (Note: Appearance(s) in the Primera B Nacional play-offs)	0	32	2
Gimnasia y Esgrima (M)	2016	Torneo Federal A	5	0	0	0	—		0	0	5	0
Gimnasia y Esgrima (M)	2016–17	Torneo Federal A	24	0	2	0	—		5	0	31	0
Gimnasia y Esgrima (M)	2017–18	Torneo Federal A	25	2	4	0	—		4	0	33	2
Gimnasia y Esgrima (M)	2018–19	Primera B Nacional	3	0	0	0	—		0	0	3	0
Gimnasia y Esgrima (M)	Total		110	5	7	0	—		14	0	131	5
Career total			161	9	7	0	—		14	0	182	9

== Honours ==
Gimnasia y Esgrima (M)

- Torneo Argentino B: 2013–14
