= Diego Pozo =

Argentine footballer and manager

Personal information
- Full name: Diego Raúl Pozo
- Date of birth: 16 February 1978 (age 48)
- Place of birth: Mendoza, Argentina
- Height: 1.90 m (6 ft 3 in)
- Position: Goalkeeper

Team information
- Current team: Gimnasia Mendoza (manager)

Senior career*
Years	Team	Apps	(Gls)
1995–2005	Godoy Cruz	150	(5)
2005–2006	Huracán	23	(0)
2006–2007	Talleres	36	(0)
2007–2008	Instituto	11	(0)
2008–2013	Colón	167	(0)
2013	Huracán	7	(0)
2014	Rangers	16	(0)
2014	Sportivo Belgrano	12	(0)
Total		422	(5)

International career
2009–2010	Argentina	3	(0)

Managerial career
- 2019–2022: Gimnasia de Mendoza
- 2023–2024: Racing de Córdoba
- 2024: Patronato
- * Club domestic league appearances and goals

Diego Raúl Pozo (born 16 February 1978) is an Argentine football manager and former professional player who played as a goalkeeper.

== Playing career ==
=== Club ===
Pozo began his playing career with Godoy Cruz in his hometown of Mendoza in 1995. He also played for Huracán, Talleres and Instituto before joining Colón in 2008.

Abroad, Pozo had a stint with Chilean club Rangers de Talca.

=== International ===
On 20 May 2009 Pozo made his debut with Argentina in a 3–1 friendly match victory against Panama. The Argentine team was made up of players based in the Argentine Primera División. He also played the friendlies against Ghana and Haiti, as well as the unofficial friendly against Catalonia. Pozo had a poor performance at the aforementioned unofficial friendly. Subsequently, he was called up for Argentina's 2010 FIFA World Cup squad as the third goalkeeper.

== Coaching career ==
Ahead of the 2019–20 season, Pozo was appointed manager of Gimnasia Mendoza. In June 2023, Pozo was hired for managerial position in Racing de Córdoba, where he is currently working.
