= Imanol González =

Argentine footballer

Personal information
- Full name: Imanol González Benac
- Date of birth: 6 January 1998 (age 28)
- Place of birth: Río Tercero, Córdoba, Argentina
- Height: 1.84 m (6 ft 0 in)
- Position: Centre-back

Team information
- Current team: Gimnasia Mendoza
- Number: 6

Youth career
- Deportivo Independiente
- 2003–2017: Belgrano

Senior career*
Years	Team	Apps	(Gls)
2017–2018	Belgrano	0	(0)
2018–2019	Senglea Athletic	13	(1)
2019	Casertana	10	(0)
2020–2021	Gudja United	25	(1)
2021–2022	Güemes	3	(0)
2022–2023	Estudiantes SL	27	(3)
2023–2025	Deportivo Maipú	38	(5)
2024	→ Huachipato (loan)	22	(1)
2025–	Gimnasia Mendoza	41	(5)

International career
2013	Argentina U15		
- * Club domestic league appearances and goals as of 16:34, 10 May 2026 (UTC)

Imanol González Benac (born 6 January 1998) is an Argentine footballer who plays as a centre-back for Gimnasia Mendoza.

== Club career ==
Born in Río Tercero, Córdoba, Argentina, González was with Deportivo Independiente in his hometown, joining the Belgrano youth system at the age of five. He was a substitute player in a match against Huracán on 27 June 2017 and promoted to the first team in 2018. After having no chances to make his debut with Belgrano, González moved to Europe in the second half of 2018 and joined Senglea Athletic in the Maltese Premier League. After a stint with Italian club Casertana during 2019, he returned to Malta and joined Gudja United.

In 2021, González returned to his homeland and joined Güemes in the Primera Nacional. The next year, he switched to Estudiantes de San Luis.

In 2023, he signed with Deportivo Maipú. In 2024, he was loaned out to Chilean Primera División champions Huachipato.

== International career ==
González represented Argentina at under-15 level in the 2013 South American Championship.

== Personal life ==
González holds an Italian passport.
