= Felix Orode =

Nigerian footballer

Personal information
- Full name: Felix Orode
- Date of birth: July 28, 1990 (age 36)
- Place of birth: Lagos, Nigeria
- Height: 1.75 m (5 ft 9 in)
- Position: Midfielder

Senior career*
Years	Team	Apps	(Gls)
2004–2006	Mighty Jets		
2006–2008	Sharks		
2009	Lleida Esportiu	0	(0)
2009–2010	San Lorenzo	1	(0)
2010	→ Nueva Chicago (loan)	6	(2)
2010–2011	C.A.I.	12	(3)
2012	Excursionistas		(6)
2012–2013	Luján	31	(7)
2013	Comunicaciones	4	(0)
2014	Walter Ormeño	8	(0)
2014–2015	Excursionistas		(4)
2016	Sportivo Barracas	42	(6)
2017–2019	Pronunciamiento	39	(8)
2019–2020	Gimnasia Mendoza	0	(0)
2021	Ciudad Bolívar	10	(5)
2022	Excursionistas	11	(2)
2024–2025	Central Ballester	15	(7)
2025	Bull Dog		
2026–	Deportivo Muñiz		
- * Club domestic league appearances and goals

Felix Orode (born 28 July 1990, in Lagos) is a Nigerian professional football midfielder for Deportivo Muñiz in the Primera C of Argentina.

== Career ==
=== Club career ===
At the age of 14, Orode scored a goal in Nigeria's First Division on April 24, 2004, playing for the Mighty Jets against Plateau United.

After going through the Mighty Jet in Nigeria, he was discovered by FIFA agent Marcelo Houseman, who took him to Lleida from Spain in 2009, where he was selected to train with the squad. That same year, he went to San Lorenzo, from the First Division of Argentina, which bought 40% of his pass. On November 21, he debuted with the first team, replacing Diego Rivero, against Huracán, at Parque Patricios, a match in which he gave Juan Manuel Torres a great assist in his team's second goal. He participated in the reserve tournament being a scorer of the same.

After the announcement of coach Diego Simeonede that was not going to be taken into account for the next tournament of the year 2010, the Nigerian player was given a loan to Nueva Chicago, of the Metropolitan B, where he played several matches reaching good performances.

In June 2010, he signed for the Comodoro Rivadavia CAI playing in the National B tournament. At the beginning of 2012 he was transferred to Excursionistas, where he played in many matches in the Primera C tournament and even in the Copa Argentina. In the second semester of 2012, he was signed by Luján. In mid-2013 he arrived at Comunicaciones, where he was directed by Jorge Vivaldo. In 2014 he had a brief stint in the Walter Ormeño Sports Club of the second division of Peru and that same year he returned to Excursionistas. He found it in 2016 playing in Sportivo Barracas de la Primera C, of Argentine soccer.

In 2017 he signed for Depro, from the province of Entre Ríos, with which he disputes the Torneo Federal A third division of Argentine soccer. In 2019, he played for Gimnasia de Mendoza. In 2021, he had a brief stint at Ciudad Bolívar. and in 2022, he returned to Excursionistas, where he had his third spell at the team.

After playing for Central Ballester. and Bull Dog in the Buenos Aires town of Daireaux, which plays in the Liga Deportiva de Bolívar. In 2026, he became a player for Deportivo Muñiz, of the Primera C.

== Personal life ==
Orode is a naturalized Argentine citizen. He is married to an Argentine national, with whom he has two children.
