= Brian Alferez =

Argentinian association football player

Personal information
- Full name: Brian Ezequiel Alferez
- Date of birth: 4 April 1998 (age 28)
- Place of birth: General Alvear, Argentina
- Height: 1.83 m (6 ft 0 in)
- Position: Centre-back

Team information
- Current team: Costa Brava

Youth career
- 2012–2018: Godoy Cruz

Senior career*
Years	Team	Apps	(Gls)
2018–2020	Godoy Cruz	3	(0)
2019–2020	→ Gimnasia Mendoza (loan)	14	(0)
2020–2021	Gimnasia Mendoza	0	(0)
2022	→ Ciudad de Bolívar (loan)	5	(0)
2023	Huracán Las Heras	44	(1)
2024–	Costa Brava	26	(2)
- * Club domestic league appearances and goals as of 13:18, 10 January 2026 (UTC)

Brian Ezequiel Alferez (born 4 April 1998) is an Argentine professional footballer who plays as a centre-back for Costa Brava in the Torneo Federal A of Argentina.

== Career ==
Alferez joined Godoy Cruz's youth system in 2012. Six years later, in January 2018, Alferez made his professional debut in a 1–0 Primera División win over Chacarita Juniors.

On 14 June 2019, Alferez agreed a loan move to Primera B Nacional's Gimnasia y Esgrima for the 2019–20 campaign. He made fifteen appearances in total for Gimnasia, prior to returning to Godoy on 30 June 2020. Days later, on 2 July, Alferez revealed that a return to Mendoza on a fresh loan deal was nearing completion. He ended up re-joining the club in August 2020 on a permanently deal. In October 2021, Alferez suffered an anterior cruciate ligament injury in a friendly game against his former club, Godoy Cruz, which kept him out for nearly 10 months. In February 2022, Alferez joined Ciudad de Bolívar on loan until the end of 2022. In February 2023, he signed for Huracán Las Heras. and by October 2024, he will reinforce Costa Brava.

== Career statistics ==
As of 3 July 2020.

Club statistics
Club	Season	League			Cup		League Cup		Continental		Other		Total	
Club	Season	Division	Apps	Goals	Apps	Goals	Apps	Goals	Apps	Goals	Apps	Goals	Apps	Goals
Godoy Cruz	2017–18	Primera División	2	0	0	0	—		—		0	0	2	0
Godoy Cruz	2018–19	Primera División	1	0	1	0	0	0	—		0	0	2	0
Godoy Cruz	2019–20	Primera División	0	0	0	0	0	0	—		0	0	0	0
Godoy Cruz	Total		3	0	1	0	0	0	—		0	0	4	0
Gimnasia y Esgrima (loan)	2019–20	Primera B Nacional	14	0	1	0	—		—		0	0	15	0
Career total			17	0	2	0	0	0	—		0	0	19	0
