= Leandro Aguirre =

Argentine footballer

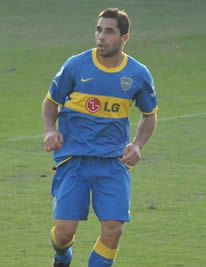

Personal information
- Full name: Leandro Damián Aguirre
- Date of birth: 8 February 1989 (age 37)
- Place of birth: Rosario, Argentina
- Height: 1.67 m (5 ft 5 1/2 in)
- Position: Left-back

Team information
- Current team: Marsaxlokk
- Number: 27

Youth career
- Boca Juniors

Senior career*
| Years | Team | Apps | (Gls) |
| 2009–2012 | Boca Juniors | 1 | (0) |
| 2010 | → Nacional (loan) | 0 | (0) |
| 2010–2011 | → Ben Hur (loan) | 1 | (0) |
| 2011–2012 | → Aldosivi (loan) | 13 | (0) |
| 2012–2014 | Aldosivi | 44 | (1) |
| 2014–2016 | Independiente Rivadavia | 54 | (0) |
| 2016–2017 | Valletta | 30 | (4) |
| 2017–2020 | Gimnasia y Esgrima | 66 | (4) |
| 2020–2021 | Valletta | 10 | (1) |
| 2021–2022 | Birkirkara | 27 | (3) |
| 2022– | Marsaxlokk | 107 | (8) |
- * Club domestic league appearances and goals as of 7 May 2026

Leandro Damián Aguirre (born 8 February 1989) is an Argentine professional footballer who plays as a left-back for Maltese Premier League club Marsaxlokk.

== Career ==
Aguirre's career began with Boca Juniors. He made his professional debut during the 2008–09 Argentine Primera División season, being substituted on at half-time of a victory away to Colón on 4 July 2009. Aguirre was loaned to Nacional of the Uruguayan Primera División in 2010, though returned to Boca Juniors soon after without featuring. 2011 saw Ben Hur sign Aguirre on loan. He was selected in one fixture in Torneo Argentino B while there. A third loan was confirmed on 30 June 2011, with Aguirre joining Primera B Nacional's Aldosivi. Fourteen appearances followed, before Aldosivi signed him permanently.

In July 2014, Aguirre moved to Independiente Rivadavia having scored one goal, versus Deportivo Merlo, in forty-six matches as a full Aldosivi player. His first appearance arrived during a home draw with Atlético Tucumán on 29 August. June 2016 saw Aguirre switch Argentina for Malta as he signed with reigning Premier League champions Valletta. His bow came in a UEFA Champions League qualifier with B36 Tórshavn, who they beat over two legs before being eliminated by Red Star Belgrade. He netted goals across the 2016–17 campaign against Balzan, Hamrun Spartans, Pembroke Athleta and Tarxien Rainbows.

Aguirre returned to his homeland with Gimnasia y Esgrima in August 2017. They won promotion from Torneo Federal A in his first season, as he went on to make forty-six appearances and score three goals in all competitions across the next two campaigns as a Primera B Nacional club. On 20 September 2020, Aguirre headed back to Maltese football for a second stint with Valletta. He scored on his competitive debut against Birkirkara a day later.

== Career statistics ==
As of 19 December 2020.

Club statistics
| Club | Season | League | | | Cup | | League Cup | | Continental | | Other | | Total | |
| Club | Season | Division | Apps | Goals | Apps | Goals | Apps | Goals | Apps | Goals | Apps | Goals | Apps | Goals |
|---|---|---|---|---|---|---|---|---|---|---|---|---|---|---|
| Boca Juniors | 2008–09 | Argentine Primera División | 1 | 0 | 0 | 0 | — | | 0 | 0 | 0 | 0 | 1 | 0 |
| Boca Juniors | 2009–10 | Argentine Primera División | 0 | 0 | 0 | 0 | — | | 0 | 0 | 0 | 0 | 0 | 0 |
| Boca Juniors | 2010–11 | Argentine Primera División | 0 | 0 | 0 | 0 | — | | — | | 0 | 0 | 0 | 0 |
| Boca Juniors | 2011–12 | Argentine Primera División | 0 | 0 | 0 | 0 | — | | 0 | 0 | 0 | 0 | 0 | 0 |
| Boca Juniors | Total | | 1 | 0 | 0 | 0 | — | | 0 | 0 | 0 | 0 | 1 | 0 |
| Nacional (loan) | 2010–11 | Uruguayan Primera División | 0 | 0 | — | | — | | 0 | 0 | 0 | 0 | 0 | 0 |
| Ben Hur (loan) | 2010–11 | Torneo Argentino B | 1 | 0 | 0 | 0 | — | | — | | 0 | 0 | 1 | 0 |
| Aldosivi (loan) | 2011–12 | Primera B Nacional | 13 | 0 | 1 | 0 | — | | — | | 0 | 0 | 14 | 0 |
| Aldosivi | 2012–13 | Primera B Nacional | 23 | 1 | 1 | 0 | — | | — | | 0 | 0 | 24 | 1 |
| Aldosivi | 2013–14 | Primera B Nacional | 21 | 0 | 1 | 0 | — | | — | | 0 | 0 | 22 | 0 |
| Aldosivi | Total | | 57 | 1 | 3 | 0 | — | | — | | 0 | 0 | 60 | 1 |
| Independiente Rivadavia | 2014 | Primera B Nacional | 11 | 0 | 0 | 0 | — | | — | | 0 | 0 | 11 | 0 |
| Independiente Rivadavia | 2015 | Primera B Nacional | 29 | 0 | 1 | 0 | — | | — | | 0 | 0 | 30 | 0 |
| Independiente Rivadavia | 2016 | Primera B Nacional | 14 | 0 | 0 | 0 | — | | — | | 0 | 0 | 14 | 0 |
| Independiente Rivadavia | Total | | 54 | 0 | 1 | 0 | — | | — | | 0 | 0 | 55 | 0 |
| Valletta | 2016–17 | Premier League | 30 | 4 | 1 | 0 | — | | 4 (Note: Appearance(s) in the UEFA Champions League) | 0 | 1 (Note: Appearance(s) in the Super Cup) | 0 | 36 | 4 |
| Gimnasia y Esgrima | 2017–18 | Torneo Federal A | 24 | 1 | 5 | 0 | — | | — | | 6 (Note: Appearance(s) in the Torneo Federal A play-offs) | 0 | 35 | 1 |
| Gimnasia y Esgrima | 2018–19 | Primera B Nacional | 23 | 0 | 1 | 0 | — | | — | | 2 (Note: Appearance(s) in the Primera B Nacional play-offs) | 0 | 26 | 0 |
| Gimnasia y Esgrima | 2019–20 | Primera B Nacional | 19 | 3 | 1 | 0 | — | | — | | 0 | 0 | 20 | 3 |
| Gimnasia y Esgrima | Total | | 66 | 4 | 7 | 0 | — | | — | | 8 | 0 | 81 | 4 |
| Valletta | 2020–21 | Premier League | 10 | 1 | 0 | 0 | — | | 0 | 0 | 0 | 0 | 10 | 1 |
| Birkirkara | 2021–22 | Premier League | 26 | 3 | 1 | 0 | — | | 0 | 0 | 0 | 0 | 27 | 3 |
| Career total | | | 219 | 10 | 12 | 0 | — | | 4 | 0 | 9 | 0 | 244 | 10 |
