= Renzo Vera =

Argentine footballer

Personal information
- Full name: Gonzalo Renzo Vera
- Date of birth: 1 June 1983 (age 43)
- Place of birth: Paraná, Argentina
- Height: 1.83 m (6 ft 0 in)
- Position: Centre back

Team information
- Current team: Gimnasia y Esgrima

Senior career*
Years	Team	Apps	(Gls)
2003–2012	Unión Santa Fe	196	(2)
2009	→ Ferro Carril Oeste (loan)	17	(0)
2010–2011	→ Tigre (loan)	18	(0)
2012–2013	Independiente Rivadavia	27	(1)
2013–2014	Talleres	32	(0)
2014–2015	San Martín	41	(3)
2016	Ferro Carril Oeste	20	(1)
2016–2019	Patronato	65	(1)
2019–	Gimnasia y Esgrima	11	(0)
- * Club domestic league appearances and goals as of 01:47, 9 November 2019 (UTC)

Gonzalo Renzo Vera (born 1 June 1983) is an Argentine professional footballer who plays as a defender for Gimnasia y Esgrima.

== Career ==
Vera's career began in 2003 with Unión Santa Fe. He left the club nine years later in 2012, following two goals in one hundred and ninety-six appearances over seasons in Primera B Nacional and the Argentine Primera División. During his time with Unión Santa Fe, Vera spent periods out on loan to Ferro Carril Oeste and Tigre; making a total of thirty-five appearances. 2012 saw Vera join Independiente Rivadavia of Primera B Nacional. He made his debut on 8 September against Defensa y Justicia, prior scoring his first Independiente Rivadavia goal versus Sarmiento on 20 April 2013.

Ahead of the 2013–14 Primera B Nacional season, Vera joined Talleres. He went on to make thirty-two appearances as Talleres were relegated to Torneo Federal A. He departed the club soon after, signing for San Martín in June 2014. San Martín won promotion to the Primera División in his first season, during which he scored twice in nineteen matches. After one season with San Martín in the top-flight, Vera returned to Primera B Nacional on 1 January 2016 after agreeing to rejoin former club Ferro Carril Oeste. On 18 July 2016, Primera División side Patronato signed Vera.

== Career statistics ==
As of 24 May 2018.

Club statistics
Club	Season	League			Cup (Note: Includes the Copa Argentina)		League Cup		Continental		Other		Total	
Club	Season	Division	Apps	Goals	Apps	Goals	Apps	Goals	Apps	Goals	Apps	Goals	Apps	Goals
Patronato	2016–17	Primera División	24	0	1	0	—		—		0	0	25	0
Patronato	2017–18	Primera División	24	0	0	0	—		—		0	0	24	0
Career total			48	0	1	0	—		—		0	0	49	0
