= Santiago López (footballer, born December 1997) =

Argentine footballer

Personal information
- Full name: Santiago López Garcia
- Date of birth: 4 December 1997 (age 28)
- Place of birth: Argentina
- Height: 1.80 m (5 ft 11 in)
- Position: Midfielder

Team information
- Current team: Banfield
- Number: 24

Youth career
- Club Banco Mendoza
- Chacras de Coria
- Beitar Jerusalem
- Hapoel Afula

Senior career*
Years	Team	Apps	(Gls)
2018–2026	Gimnasia Mendoza	103	(9)
2022	→ Quilmes (loan)	28	(0)
2024	→ San Martín SJ (loan)	41	(1)
2025	→ Banfield (loan)	26	(1)
2026–	Banfield	30	(2)
- * Club domestic league appearances and goals as of 17:55, 8 November 2026 (UTC)

Santiago López Garcia (born 4 December 1997) is an Argentine professional footballer who plays as a midfielder for Banfield.

== Career ==
At youth level, López played for Club Banco Mendoza and Chacras de Coria. In January 2016, López moved to Israel to sign with Hapoel Afula's academy; having had a short stint with Beitar Jerusalem's. He netted nine goals in fifteen appearances in the Youth League, including hat-tricks against Ihud Bnei Baqa and Maccabi Ironi Kiryat Ata. López soon returned to his homeland, signing with Gimnasia y Esgrima. Having been an unused substitute against Olimpo on 2 December 2018, he made his professional bow during a 2–2 draw with Los Andes on 1 February 2019. In February 2022, López joined Quilmes on a loan deal for the rest of 2022.

== Career statistics ==
As of 2 February 2019.

Club statistics
Club	Season	League			Cup		Continental		Other		Total	
Club	Season	Division	Apps	Goals	Apps	Goals	Apps	Goals	Apps	Goals	Apps	Goals
Gimnasia y Esgrima	2018–19	Primera B Nacional	1	0	0	0	—		0	0	1	0
Career total			1	0	0	0	—		0	0	1	0
