= Gabriel Fernández (footballer, born 1992) =

Argentine footballer

Personal information
- Full name: Gabriel Fernández
- Date of birth: 3 April 1992 (age 34)
- Place of birth: La Banda, Argentina
- Position: Centre back

Team information
- Current team: Atlético Rafaela

Senior career*
Years	Team	Apps	(Gls)
2013–2014	Central Córdoba	4	(0)
2014–2015	San Lorenzo	14	(3)
2015–2018	Central Córdoba	61	(4)
2017–2018	→ Instituto (loan)	13	(0)
2018–2019	Gimnasia Mendoza	14	(1)
2019–2020	Alvarado	17	(1)
2020–2023	Güemes	71	(3)
2023	Tristán Suárez	4	(1)
2023–2024	Deportivo Riestra	0	(0)
2024–2025	Sarmiento La Banda	33	(1)
2025–	Atlético Rafaela	35	(4)
- * Club domestic league appearances and goals as of 18:05, 27 March 2026 (UTC)

Gabriel Fernández (born 3 April 1992) is an Argentine professional footballer who plays as a defender for Atlético Rafaela.

== Career ==
Central Córdoba became Fernández's first senior club in 2013. After making his senior debut against Central Norte on 29 March, Fernández featured in four further fixtures during 2012–13 as the club were eliminated from the promotion play-offs by Libertad. He remained for one more Torneo Argentino A season, prior to departing on 21 July 2014 to fellow tier three team San Lorenzo. His opening goal arrived three months later during a draw with Estudiantes, which was followed by a brace against Américo Tesorieri weeks later on 26 October. January 2015 saw Fernández resign for Central Córdoba; newly promoted to Primera B Nacional.

Four goals across sixty-one matches subsequently occurred for the Santiago del Estero club, who were relegated in the 2016–17 campaign. Fernández spent 2017–18 back in the second tier on loan with Instituto. He was selected thirteen times for them over ten months. On 21 August 2018, Fernández joined Gimnasia y Esgrima. He was sent off on his second appearance versus Deportivo Morón, receiving a straight red card after thirty-six minutes of a goalless draw.

== Career statistics ==
As of 16 January 2019.

Club statistics
Club	Season	League			Cup		Continental		Other		Total	
Club	Season	Division	Apps	Goals	Apps	Goals	Apps	Goals	Apps	Goals	Apps	Goals
Central Córdoba	2012–13	Torneo Argentino A	3	0	0	0	—		2 (Note: Appearance(s) in the Torneo Argentino A play-offs)	0	5	0
Central Córdoba	2013–14	Torneo Argentino A	1	0	1	0	—		1	0	3	0
Central Córdoba	Total		4	0	1	0	—		3	0	8	0
San Lorenzo	2014	Torneo Federal A	14	3	1	0	—		4 (Note: Appearance(s) in the Torneo Federal A play-offs)	0	19	3
Central Córdoba	2015	Primera B Nacional	10	0	0	0	—		0	0	10	0
Central Córdoba	2016	Primera B Nacional	11	1	0	0	—		0	0	11	1
Central Córdoba	2016–17	Primera B Nacional	40	3	0	0	—		0	0	40	3
Central Córdoba	2017–18	Torneo Federal A	0	0	0	0	—		0	0	0	0
Central Córdoba	Total		61	4	0	0	—		0	0	61	4
Instituto (loan)	2017–18	Primera B Nacional	13	0	0	0	—		0	0	13	0
Gimnasia y Esgrima	2018–19	Primera B Nacional	9	1	0	0	—		0	0	9	1
Career total			101	8	2	0	—		7	0	110	8
