= Miguel Barbero =

Argentine professional footballer

Personal information
- Full name: Alan Miguel Barbero
- Date of birth: 28 October 1996 (age 30)
- Place of birth: Mendoza, Argentina
- Height: 1.73 m (5 ft 8 in)
- Position: Defender

Senior career*
Years	Team	Apps	(Gls)
2015–2019	Gimnasia y Esgrima	4	(0)
- * Club domestic league appearances and goals

Alan Miguel Barbero (born 28 October 1996) is an Argentine professional footballer who plays as a defender.

== Career ==
Barbero began with Gimnasia y Esgrima. His first taste of senior football occurred in August 2015 when he was an unused substitute in a Primera B Nacional loss to Patronato, though he never played in 2015 which ended with relegation. His first appearances didn't arrive until 2017–18, with the defender featuring in Copa Argentina ties against Talleres and Olimpo before making his Torneo Federal A bow versus Unión de Villa Krause. Another appearance arrived in a win over Alvarado, as Gimnasia won promotion to Primera B Nacional. His first appearance in tier two came as they lost to Arsenal de Sarandí in 2019.

== Career statistics ==
As of 30 December 2020.

Appearances and goals by club, season and competition
Club	Season	League			Cup		Continental		Other		Total	
Club	Season	Division	Apps	Goals	Apps	Goals	Apps	Goals	Apps	Goals	Apps	Goals
Gimnasia y Esgrima	2015	Primera B Nacional	0	0	0	0	—		0	0	0	0
Gimnasia y Esgrima	2016	Torneo Federal A	0	0	0	0	—		0	0	0	0
Gimnasia y Esgrima	2016–17	Torneo Federal A	0	0	0	0	—		0	0	0	0
Gimnasia y Esgrima	2017–18	Torneo Federal A	2	0	3	0	—		0	0	5	0
Gimnasia y Esgrima	2018–19	Primera B Nacional	2	0	0	0	—		0	0	2	0
Career total			4	0	3	0	—		0	0	7	0
