= Diego Mondino =

Argentine footballer

Personal information
- Full name: Diego Gustavo Mondino
- Date of birth: 14 November 1994 (age 31)
- Place of birth: San Francisco, Argentina
- Position: Defender

Team information
- Current team: Gimnasia Mendoza
- Number: 2

Senior career*
Years	Team	Apps	(Gls)
2012–2013	Sportivo Belgrano	2	(0)
2013–2015	Atlético de Rafaela	0	(0)
2015–2017	Defensores de Belgrano	60	(4)
2017–2023	Gimnasia Mendoza	141	(9)
2023–2024	Agropecuario	35	(3)
2024	UT Cajamarca	17	(1)
2024–	Gimnasia Mendoza	70	(0)
- * Club domestic league appearances and goals as of 16:32, 10 May 2026 (UTC)

Diego Gustavo Mondino (born 14 November 1994) is an Argentine professional footballer who plays as a defender for Gimnasia Mendoza.

== Career ==
Mondino made his debut in senior football at the age of seventeen with Sportivo Belgrano, appearing in two matches for the club in Torneo Argentino A. In 2013, Mondino joined Primera División side Atlético de Rafaela. However, he departed two years later after no appearances. Defensores de Belgrano of tier three subsequently signed Mondino. He scored his first goal in September 2015 against Juventud Unida Universitario. Further goals for them came versus General Belgrano, Agropecuario and Alvarado. Mondino moved to Gimnasia Mendoza in August 2017. His first season, 2017–18, ended with promotion.

He made his bow in professional football with Gimnasia y Esgrima, with the defender starting a Primera B Nacional fixture with Los Andes on 1 February 2019.

== Career statistics ==
As of 2 February 2019.

Club statistics
Club	Season	League			Cup		Continental		Other		Total	
Club	Season	Division	Apps	Goals	Apps	Goals	Apps	Goals	Apps	Goals	Apps	Goals
Sportivo Belgrano	2012–13	Torneo Argentino A	2	0	1	0	—		0	0	3	0
Atlético de Rafaela	2013–14	Primera División	0	0	0	0	—		0	0	0	0
Atlético de Rafaela	2014	Primera División	0	0	0	0	—		0	0	0	0
Atlético de Rafaela	Total		0	0	0	0	—		0	0	0	0
Defensores de Belgrano	2015	Torneo Federal A	25	1	0	0	—		3 (Note: Appearance(s) in the Torneo Federal A play-offs)	0	28	1
Defensores de Belgrano	2016	Torneo Federal A	12	1	3	0	—		3	0	18	1
Defensores de Belgrano	2016–17	Torneo Federal A	28	2	3	0	—		5	0	31	2
Defensores de Belgrano	Total		60	4	6	0	—		11	0	77	4
Gimnasia Mendoza	2017–18	Torneo Federal A	28	1	6	0	—		5	0	39	1
Gimnasia Mendoza	2018–19	Primera B Nacional	1	0	0	0	—		0	0	1	0
Gimnasia Mendoza	Total		29	1	6	0	—		5	0	40	1
Career total			91	5	13	0	—		16	0	120	5
