= Argentino de Mendoza =

Argentine football club

Atletico Argentino de Mendoza is a football team from Mendoza, Argentina.

As of 2009/10 they were playing in the Torneo Argentino B (4th level), although they were relegated at the end of the season.

== Honours ==
=== Regional ===
- Primera A de Liga Mendocina
  - Winners (8): 1934, 1941, 1942, 1943, 1948, 1959, 1995, 1996
- Primera B de Liga Mendocina
  - Winners (3): 1994, 2003, 2009
- Campeonato de Honor
  - Winners (1): 1936
- Copa Competencia
  - Winners (1): 1941

Torneo de Preparación

  - Winners (1): 1942

Torneo Vendimia

  - Winners (1): 1968

== See also ==
- Argentine football league system
