= Brian Andrada =

Argentine professional footballer

Personal information
- Full name: Omar Brian Andrada
- Date of birth: 22 June 1997 (age 29)
- Place of birth: Mendoza, Argentina
- Height: 1.67 m (5 ft 6 in)
- Position: Forward

Team information
- Current team: Gimnasia Mendoza
- Number: 33

Youth career
- Gimnasia LP

Senior career*
| Years | Team | Apps | (Gls) |
| 2015–2017 | Gimnasia LP | 2 | (0) |
| 2018 | Ferro Carril Oeste | 6 | (0) |
| 2018– | Gimnasia Mendoza | 82 | (3) |
| 2022–2023 | → San Martín T. (loan) | 52 | (4) |
| 2024 | → Sportivo Trinidense (loan) | 24 | (0) |
- * Club domestic league appearances and goals as of 16:46, 10 May 2026 (UTC)

Omar Brian Andrada (born 22 June 1997) is an Argentine professional footballer who plays as a forward for Gimnasia Mendoza.

== Career ==
La Plata's Gimnasia y Esgrima were the opening club of Andrada's senior career. Pedro Troglio promoted the forward into his squad during the 2015 Primera División, with Andrada making his professional bow on 11 April in a 4–1 win over Aldosivi; having been an unused substitute on two previous occasions. Despite remaining for three total seasons, he made just one more appearance for them; a four-minute cameo versus Sarmiento in February 2016. On 4 January 2018, Andrada joined Ferro Carril Oeste of Torneo Federal A. His first appearances came later that month over two legs in the Copa Argentina against Independiente.

August 2018 saw Andrada complete a move to Primera B Nacional side Gimnasia y Esgrima; a team located in Mendoza. On 1 June 2022, Andrada joined San Martín de Tucumán on loan until the end of 2023.

== Career statistics ==
As of 18 January 2019.

Club statistics
| Club | Season | League | | | Cup | | Continental | | Other | | Total | |
| Club | Season | Division | Apps | Goals | Apps | Goals | Apps | Goals | Apps | Goals | Apps | Goals |
|---|---|---|---|---|---|---|---|---|---|---|---|---|
| Gimnasia y Esgrima (LP) | 2015 | Primera División | 1 | 0 | 0 | 0 | — | | 0 | 0 | 1 | 0 |
| Gimnasia y Esgrima (LP) | 2016 | Primera División | 1 | 0 | 0 | 0 | — | | 0 | 0 | 1 | 0 |
| Gimnasia y Esgrima (LP) | 2016–17 | Primera División | 0 | 0 | 0 | 0 | — | | 0 | 0 | 0 | 0 |
| Gimnasia y Esgrima (LP) | Total | | 2 | 0 | 0 | 0 | — | | 0 | 0 | 2 | 0 |
| Ferro Carril Oeste | 2017–18 | Torneo Federal A | 6 | 0 | 2 | 0 | — | | 2 (Note: Appearance(s) in the Torneo Federal A play-offs) | 0 | 10 | 0 |
| Gimnasia y Esgrima (M) | 2018–19 | Primera B Nacional | 0 | 0 | 0 | 0 | — | | 0 | 0 | 0 | 0 |
| Career total | | | 8 | 0 | 2 | 0 | — | | 2 | 0 | 12 | 0 |
