= Emmanuel García (footballer, born 1993) =

Argentine footballer

Personal information
- Full name: Emmanuel David García
- Date of birth: 8 July 1993 (age 33)
- Place of birth: Mendoza, Argentina
- Height: 1.75 m (5 ft 9 in)
- Position: Midfielder

Team information
- Current team: Temperley

Senior career*
Years	Team	Apps	(Gls)
2014–2017	Godoy Cruz	21	(0)
2016–2017	→ Gimnasia Mendoza (loan)	25	(2)
2017–2018	Fundación Amigos		
2018–2021	Gimnasia Mendoza	37	(3)
2020–2021	Huracán Las Heras	6	(0)
2021–2022	Gimnasia Jujuy	41	(0)
2022–	Temperley	5	(0)
- * Club domestic league appearances and goals as of 18:50, 3 August 2022 (UTC)

Emmanuel David García (born 8 July 1993) is an Argentine professional footballer who plays as a midfielder for Temperley.

== Career ==
García's career began in the system of Godoy Cruz. After being an unused substitute for a fixture versus Racing Club in the 2014 Argentine Primera División, García was selected for his professional debut during a draw with San Martín on 14 February 2015. He featured in a further sixteen matches in all competitions for Godoy Cruz across the 2015 season, before participating five times in 2016. In August 2016, García was loaned to Torneo Federal A's Gimnasia y Esgrima. Twenty-eight appearances followed, over the course of which García netted his opening goals against Deportivo Maipú and Mitre.

In 2018, following a stint in regional football with Fundación Amigos, García rejoined Gimnasia y Esgrima on a permanent contract.

== Career statistics ==
As of 18 January 2019.

Club statistics
Club	Season	League			Cup		Continental		Other		Total	
Club	Season	Division	Apps	Goals	Apps	Goals	Apps	Goals	Apps	Goals	Apps	Goals
Godoy Cruz	2014	Primera División	0	0	0	0	0	0	0	0	0	0
Godoy Cruz	2015	Primera División	16	0	1	0	—		0	0	17	0
Godoy Cruz	2016	Primera División	5	0	0	0	—		0	0	5	0
Godoy Cruz	2016–17	Primera División	0	0	0	0	0	0	0	0	0	0
Godoy Cruz	Total		21	0	1	0	0	0	0	0	22	0
Gimnasia y Esgrima (loan)	2016–17	Torneo Federal A	25	2	1	0	—		2 (Note: Appearance(s) in the Torneo Federal A play-offs)	0	28	2
Gimnasia y Esgrima	2018–19	Primera B Nacional	7	1	0	0	—		0	0	7	1
Gimnasia y Esgrima	Total		32	3	1	0	—		2	0	35	3
Career total			53	3	2	0	0	0	2	0	57	3
