= Nicolás Bertocchi =

Argentine footballer (born 1989)

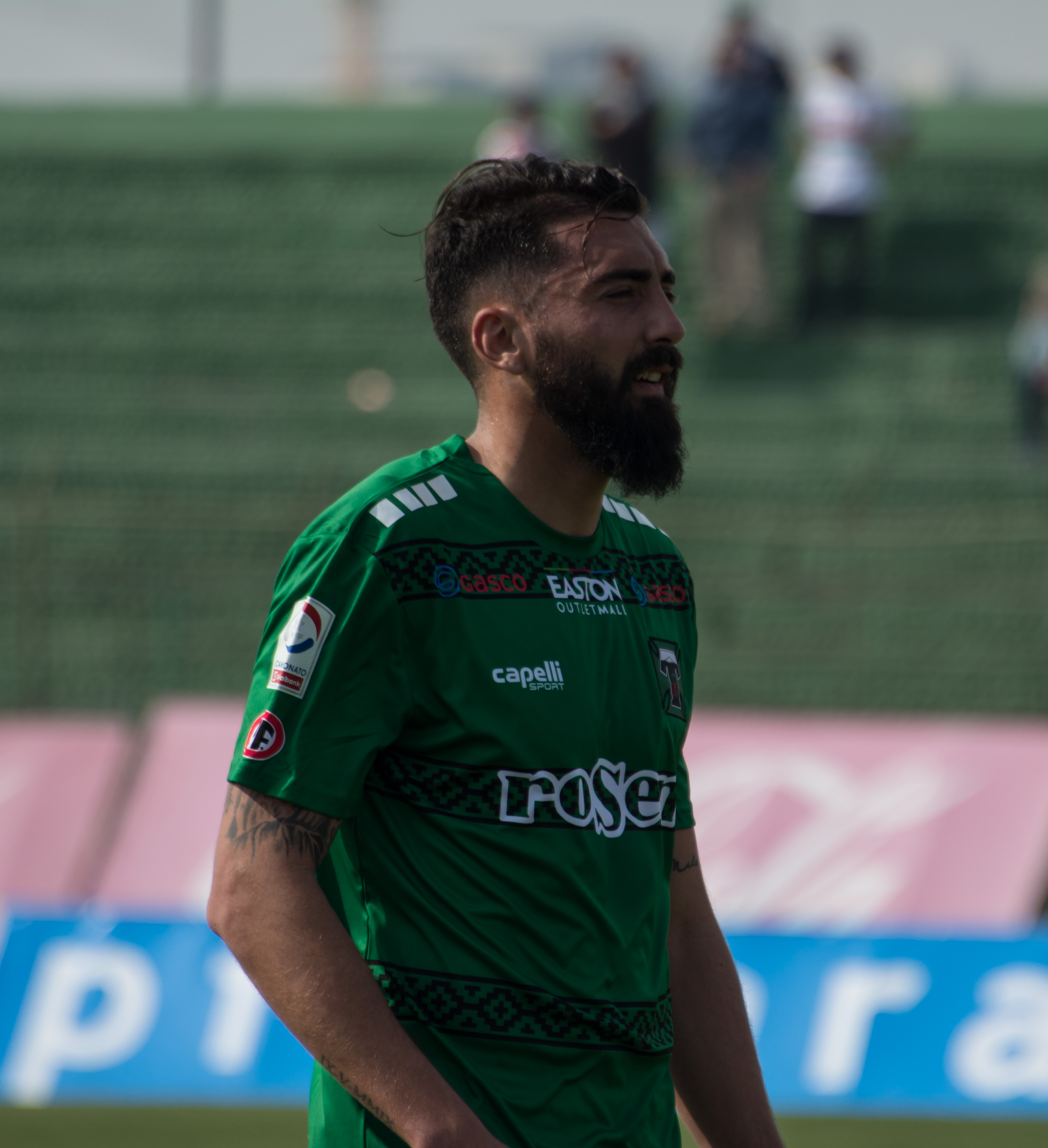
- Bertocchi with Deportes Temuco in 2018

Personal information
- Full name: Miguel Nicolás Bertocchi
- Date of birth: 9 June 1989 (age 37)
- Place of birth: Granadero Baigorria, Argentina
- Height: 1.90 m (6 ft 3 in)
- Position: Midfielder

Team information
- Current team: Cerro Largo
- Number: 22

Senior career*
Years	Team	Apps	(Gls)
2010–2017	San Lorenzo	3	(0)
2011	→ Aldosivi (loan)	6	(0)
2013–2014	→ Unión Santa Fe (loan)	31	(5)
2014–2015	→ Defensa y Justicia (loan)	26	(2)
2016–2017	→ Patronato (loan)	38	(5)
2017–2018	Tigre	2	(0)
2018–2019	Deportes Temuco	9	(0)
2019–2020	San Martín SJ	10	(0)
2020–2021	Central Norte	0	(0)
2021	Gimnasia Jujuy	12	(0)
2022	Villa Dálmine	30	(1)
2023–2024	Fénix	31	(0)
2024–	Cerro Largo	34	(6)
- * Club domestic league appearances and goals as of 1 October 2025

Miguel Nicolás Bertocchi (born 9 June 1989) is an Argentine professional footballer who plays as a midfielder for Uruguayan club Cerro Largo.

== Career ==
Bertocchi began with San Lorenzo. He was promoted into their senior squad during the 2009–10 Argentine Primera División season, making the first of three appearances on 28 March 2010 versus Arsenal de Sarandí - his career debut. Two seasons later, Bertocchi was loaned to Primera B Nacional's Aldosivi. Seven appearances followed with the club. He returned to San Lorenzo for 2012–13 and appeared on the bench four times, but failed to feature. He subsequently joined Unión Santa Fe of the Argentine Primera División on loan in August 2013. He netted two goals in his eighth game, against Defensa y Justicia.

Overall, Bertocchi scored five times in thirty-one fixtures for Unión Santa Fe. Defensa y Justicia became Bertocchi's fourth club on 30 June 2014. He remained for the 2014 and 2015 seasons, scoring twice versus Atlético de Rafaela and Gimnasia y Esgrima respectively. In the following two campaigns, Bertocchi played for fellow Primera División team Patronato. On 30 August 2017, Bertocchi joined Argentine Primera División side Tigre. He had to wait until January 2018 for his debut, during a home loss to Banfield at the Estadio José Dellagiovanna. Bertocchi officially departed Tigre in the succeeding months.

In February 2018, Bertocchi made a move to Sweden to join Dalkurd FF of the Allsvenskan. However, the club claimed to have pulled out of the signing but Bertocchi declared all parties signed a contract. He subsequently took the club to court in the following April, with a final decision not being made until September 2019. Two months later, in June 2018, Bertocchi agreed to join Chilean Primera División team Deportes Temuco. After ten total matches for Temuco, Bertocchi made a return to Argentina with San Martín on 4 June 2019.

== Career statistics ==
As of 13 August 2019.

Appearances and goals by club, season and competition
Club	Season	League			National cup		League cup		Continental		Other		Total	
Club	Season	Division	Apps	Goals	Apps	Goals	Apps	Goals	Apps	Goals	Apps	Goals	Apps	Goals
San Lorenzo	2009–10	Argentine Primera División	3	0	0	0	—		0	0	0	0	3	0
San Lorenzo	2010–11	Argentine Primera División	0	0	0	0	—		—		0	0	0	0
San Lorenzo	2011–12	Argentine Primera División	0	0	0	0	—		—		0	0	0	0
San Lorenzo	2012–13	Argentine Primera División	0	0	0	0	—		—		0	0	0	0
San Lorenzo	2013–14	Argentine Primera División	0	0	0	0	—		0	0	0	0	0	0
San Lorenzo	2014	Argentine Primera División	0	0	0	0	—		—		0	0	0	0
San Lorenzo	2015	Argentine Primera División	0	0	0	0	—		0	0	0	0	0	0
San Lorenzo	2016	Argentine Primera División	0	0	0	0	—		0	0	0	0	0	0
San Lorenzo	2016–17	Argentine Primera División	0	0	0	0	—		0	0	0	0	0	0
San Lorenzo	Total		3	0	0	0	—		0	0	0	0	3	0
Aldosivi (loan)	2011–12	Primera B Nacional	6	0	1	0	—		—		0	0	7	0
Unión Santa Fe (loan)	2013–14	Primera B Nacional	31	5	0	0	—		—		0	0	31	5
Defensa y Justicia (loan)	2014	Argentine Primera División	14	1	3	0	—		—		0	0	17	1
Defensa y Justicia (loan)	2015	Argentine Primera División	12	1	1	1	—		—		0	0	13	2
Defensa y Justicia (loan)	Total		26	2	4	1	—		—		0	0	30	3
Patronato (loan)	2016	Argentine Primera División	13	1	0	0	—		—		0	0	13	1
Patronato (loan)	2016–17	Argentine Primera División	25	4	2	0	—		—		0	0	27	4
Patronato (loan)	Total		38	5	2	0	—		—		0	0	40	5
Tigre	2017–18	Argentine Primera División	2	0	0	0	—		—		0	0	2	0
Deportes Temuco	2018	Chilean Primera División	9	0	0	0	—		1 (Note: Appearance(s) in the Copa Sudamericana)	0	0	0	10	0
San Martín	2019–20	Primera B Nacional	0	0	0	0	—		—		0	0	0	0
Career total			115	12	7	1	—		1	0	0	0	123	13
