= Iván Ramírez (footballer, born 1990) =

Argentine footballer

Personal information
- Full name: Iván Ricardo Ramírez
- Date of birth: 23 February 1990 (age 36)
- Place of birth: Grand Bourg, Argentina
- Height: 1.70 m (5 ft 7 in)
- Position: Midfielder

Team information
- Current team: San Miguel

Senior career*
Years	Team	Apps	(Gls)
2012–2014	Fénix	47	(1)
2014–2015	Deportivo Español	49	(0)
2016–2017	San Miguel	49	(0)
2017–2020	Flandria	21	(1)
2018–2019	→ Almagro (loan)	25	(0)
2019–2020	→ Gimnasia Mendoza (loan)	19	(0)
2020–2021	Central Córdoba SdE	5	(0)
2021	Gimnasia Mendoza	30	(0)
2022–2023	Belgrano	18	(0)
2023–2026	Quilmes	84	(1)
2026–	San Miguel	9	(0)
- * Club domestic league appearances and goals as of 18:00, 5 May 2026 (UTC)

Iván Ricardo Ramírez (born 23 February 1990) is an Argentine professional footballer who plays as a midfielder for San Miguel.

== Career ==
Ramírez's career began in 2012 with Fénix, he made his professional bow in Primera B Metropolitana on 12 August against Temperley; though he had featured twenty-eight times and scored once in Primera C Metropolitana in the season prior. Ramírez joined Deportivo Español on 30 June 2014, subsequently featuring in fifty-two matches across 2014 and 2015. Primera C Metropolitana side San Miguel signed Ramírez in January 2016, which preceded a move to Flandria in August 2017. His first appearance arrived versus Agropecuario on 24 September, which was the first of twenty-one appearances in 2017–18 as Flandria finished 24th.

On 11 July 2018, after Flandria were relegated to Primera B Metropolitana, Ramírez was loaned to Almagro of Primera B Nacional.

== Career statistics ==
As of 15 November 2018.

Club statistics
Club	Season	League			Cup (Note: Includes the Copa Argentina)		League Cup		Continental		Other		Total	
Club	Season	Division	Apps	Goals	Apps	Goals	Apps	Goals	Apps	Goals	Apps	Goals	Apps	Goals
Fénix	2012–13	Primera C Metropolitana	28	1	0	0	—		—		0	0	28	1
Fénix	2013–14	Primera B Metropolitana	19	0	0	0	—		—		1 (Note: One appearance in the 2013–14 Primera B Metropolitana play-offs)	0	20	0
Fénix	Total		47	1	0	0	—		—		1	0	48	1
Deportivo Español	2014	Primera B Metropolitana	18	0	0	0	—		—		0	0	18	0
Deportivo Español	2015	Primera B Metropolitana	31	0	3	0	—		—		0	0	34	0
Deportivo Español	Total		49	0	3	0	—		—		0	0	52	0
Flandria	2017–18	Primera B Nacional	21	1	0	0	—		—		0	0	21	1
Flandria	2018–19	Primera B Metropolitana	0	0	0	0	—		—		0	0	0	0
Flandria	Total		21	1	0	0	—		—		0	0	21	1
Almagro (loan)	2018–19	Primera B Nacional	10	0	3	0	—		—		0	0	13	0
Career total			127	2	6	0	—		—		1	0	134	2
