= Ignacio Morales (footballer) =

Argentine footballer

Personal information
- Full name: Ignacio Gastón Morales
- Date of birth: 11 February 1998 (age 28)
- Place of birth: Argentina
- Height: 1.78 m (5 ft 10 in)
- Position: Forward

Team information
- Current team: Gimnasia y Esgrima

Youth career
- Gimnasia y Esgrima

Senior career*
| Years | Team | Apps | (Gls) |
| 2016– | Gimnasia y Esgrima | 8 | (1) |
- * Club domestic league appearances and goals as of 12:26, 19 January 2019 (UTC)

Ignacio Gastón Morales (born 11 February 1998) is an Argentine professional footballer who plays as a forward for Gimnasia y Esgrima.

== Career ==
Morales' career started with Gimnasia y Esgrima. He featured on three occasions throughout the 2016–17 and 2017–18 seasons in Torneo Federal A, with the latter ending with promotion to Primera B Nacional. His professional debut subsequently arrived on 15 September 2018 against Chacarita Juniors, with the forward netting a ninetieth-minute winner in a 2–1 home victory; he had been substituted on two minutes prior.

== Career statistics ==
As of 19 January 2019.

Club statistics
| Club | Season | League | | | Cup | | Continental | | Other | | Total | |
| Club | Season | Division | Apps | Goals | Apps | Goals | Apps | Goals | Apps | Goals | Apps | Goals |
|---|---|---|---|---|---|---|---|---|---|---|---|---|
| Gimnasia y Esgrima | 2016–17 | Torneo Federal A | 1 | 0 | 0 | 0 | — | | 0 | 0 | 1 | 0 |
| Gimnasia y Esgrima | 2017–18 | Torneo Federal A | 1 | 0 | 1 | 0 | — | | 0 | 0 | 2 | 0 |
| Gimnasia y Esgrima | 2018–19 | Primera B Nacional | 6 | 1 | 0 | 0 | — | | 0 | 0 | 6 | 1 |
| Career total | | | 8 | 1 | 1 | 0 | — | | 0 | 0 | 9 | 1 |
