= Tomás Marchiori =

Argentine footballer

Personal information
- Full name: Tomás Ignacio Marchiori Carreño
- Date of birth: 20 June 1995 (age 31)
- Place of birth: Godoy Cruz, Argentina
- Height: 1.86 m (6 ft 1 in)
- Position: Goalkeeper

Team information
- Current team: Vélez Sarsfield
- Number: 1

Youth career
- Gimnasia y Esgrima

Senior career*
Years	Team	Apps	(Gls)
2013–2020	Gimnasia y Esgrima	58	(0)
2020–2021	→ Atlético Tucumán (loan)	1	(0)
2022–2024	Atlético Tucumán	49	(0)
2024–	Vélez Sarsfield	74	(0)
- * Club domestic league appearances and goals as of 17:33, 6 December 2025 (UTC)

Tomás Ignacio Marchiori Carreño (born 20 June 1995) is an Argentine professional footballer who plays as a goalkeeper for Vélez Sarsfield.

== Career ==
Marchiori began his career with Gimnasia y Esgrima. He featured in two fixtures in Torneo Argentino B during the 2013–14 season, which ended with promotion to the third tier for 2014. He didn't make an appearance in either of the following three campaigns, which were spent in Torneo Federal A either side of a stint in Primera B Nacional. Sixteen appearances arrived across 2016–17 and 2017–18, the latter ended with the club being promoted back to tier two. Marchiori subsequently made his professional debut on 26 August 2018 during a 2–1 victory over Temperley.

On 2 October 2020, Marchiori joined Atlético Tucumán on loan until the end of 2021. At the end of December 2021, Atlético Tucumán bough him free and signed him on a permanent contract.

== Career statistics ==
As of 15 December 2024.

Appearances and goals by club, season and competition
Club	Season	League			Cup		Continental		Other		Total	
Club	Season	Division	Apps	Goals	Apps	Goals	Apps	Goals	Apps	Goals	Apps	Goals
Gimnasia y Esgrima	2013–14	Torneo Argentino B	2	0	0	0	—		—		2	0
Gimnasia y Esgrima	2014	Torneo Federal A	0	0	1	0	—		—		1	0
Gimnasia y Esgrima	2015	Primera B Nacional	0	0	0	0	—		—		0	0
Gimnasia y Esgrima	2016	Torneo Federal A	0	0	0	0	—		—		0	0
Gimnasia y Esgrima	2016–17	Torneo Federal A	1	0	3	0	—		—		4	0
Gimnasia y Esgrima	2017–18	Torneo Federal A	10	0	3	0	—		5 (Note: Appearance(s) in the Torneo Federal A play-offs)	0	18	0
Gimnasia y Esgrima	2018–19	Primera B Nacional	22	0	1	0	—		—		23	0
Gimnasia y Esgrima	2019–20	Primera B Nacional	20	0	1	0	—		—		21	0
Gimnasia y Esgrima	Total		55	0	9	0	—		5	0	69	0
Atlético Tucumán (loan)	2020–21	Primera División	1	0	1	0	0	0	—		2	0
Atlético Tucumán	2021	Primera División	0	0	—		—		—		0	0
Atlético Tucumán	2022	Primera División	8	0	0	0	—		—		8	0
Atlético Tucumán	2023	Primera División	41	0	0	0	—		—		41	0
Atlético Tucumán	Total		50	0	1	0	0	0	—		51	0
Vélez Sarsfield	2024	Primera División	43	0	5	0	—		1	0	49	0
Career total			148	0	15	0	0	0	6	0	169	0

== Honours ==
Vélez Sarsfield

- Argentine Primera División: 2024
- Supercopa Internacional: 2024
