= Oliveros, Santa Fe =

Coordinates: 32°34′S 60°51′W

Oliveros is a town in the province of Santa Fe, Argentina. The municipality has 4,750 inhabitants and is classed as a comuna. It is located in the Iriondo Department, 126 km south from the capital of the province.

Oliveros is home to a large public psychiatric treatment center and residence (Colonia Psiquiátrica Dr. A. I. Freyre) that is run by the provincial government. About 700 patients are overseen by the center, with 500 living permanently within it.

The town also has a large number of camping grounds with facilities such as cabins, swimming pools, bars, sports fields, etc., that are often employed by people from the rest of the province, especially the Greater Rosario area.

== Climate ==
Climate data for Oliveros, Santa Fe (1981–2010)
Month	Jan	Feb	Mar	Apr	May	Jun	Jul	Aug	Sep	Oct	Nov	Dec	Year
Mean daily maximum °C (°F)	31.1 (88.0)	29.4 (84.9)	27.7 (81.9)	23.7 (74.7)	20.2 (68.4)	16.8 (62.2)	16.5 (61.7)	19.2 (66.6)	21.2 (70.2)	24.6 (76.3)	27.4 (81.3)	29.7 (85.5)	23.9 (75.0)
Daily mean °C (°F)	24.9 (76.8)	23.6 (74.5)	22.0 (71.6)	18.1 (64.6)	14.8 (58.6)	11.7 (53.1)	11.1 (52.0)	13.1 (55.6)	15.1 (59.2)	18.5 (65.3)	21.4 (70.5)	23.6 (74.5)	18.2 (64.8)
Mean daily minimum °C (°F)	18.7 (65.7)	17.7 (63.9)	16.3 (61.3)	12.5 (54.5)	9.4 (48.9)	6.6 (43.9)	5.6 (42.1)	7.1 (44.8)	9.0 (48.2)	12.5 (54.5)	15.3 (59.5)	17.5 (63.5)	12.3 (54.1)
Average precipitation mm (inches)	112.0 (4.41)	122.8 (4.83)	133.0 (5.24)	100.1 (3.94)	58.3 (2.30)	25.0 (0.98)	23.8 (0.94)	28.9 (1.14)	49.1 (1.93)	113.0 (4.45)	107.3 (4.22)	142.9 (5.63)	1,016 (40.00)
Average relative humidity (%)	67	74	77	79	80	81	79	73	70	69	67	68	74
Mean monthly sunshine hours	288.3	234.5	229.4	192.0	173.6	141.0	167.4	195.3	198.0	229.4	264.0	269.7	2,582.6
Percentage possible sunshine	66.3	62.6	60.5	56.8	53.5	47.1	53.1	57.4	55.6	57.4	63.4	61.3	57.9
Source: Instituto Nacional de Tecnología Agropecuaria
