= Gimnasia y Esgrima de Mendoza =

Gimnasia y Esgrima
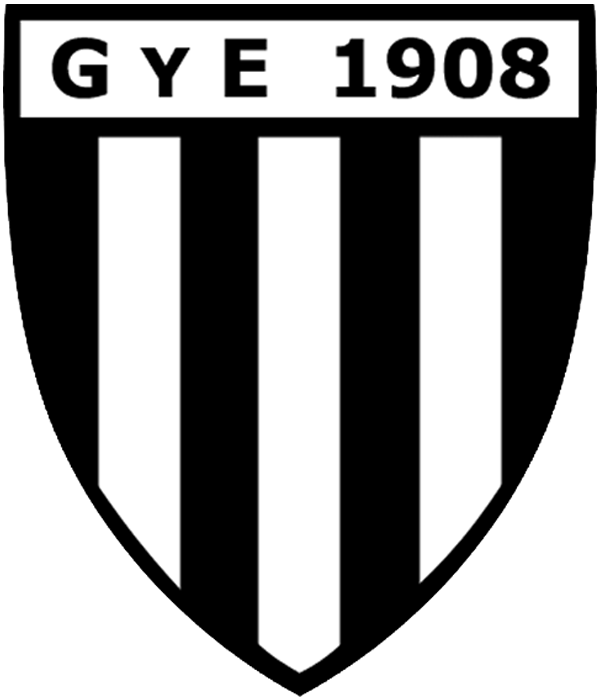
- Full name: Club Atlético Gimnasia y Esgrima
- Nicknames: Lobo mendocino Mensana; Blanquinegro
- Founded: 30 August 1908; 118 years ago
- Ground: Estadio Víctor Antonio Legrotaglie
- Capacity: 11,500
- Chairman: Fernando Porretta
- Manager: Darío Franco
- League: Liga Profesional
- 2025: Primera Nacional Zone B, 1st of 18 (champions and promoted)
- Website: gimnasiayesgrimamza.com.ar
Home colours	Away colours	Third colours

Club Atlético Gimnasia y Esgrima (usually known as Gimnasia y Esgrima de Mendoza) is an Argentine football club located in the city of Mendoza. They currently play in the Primera Division, the first division of the Argentine football league system.

== History ==
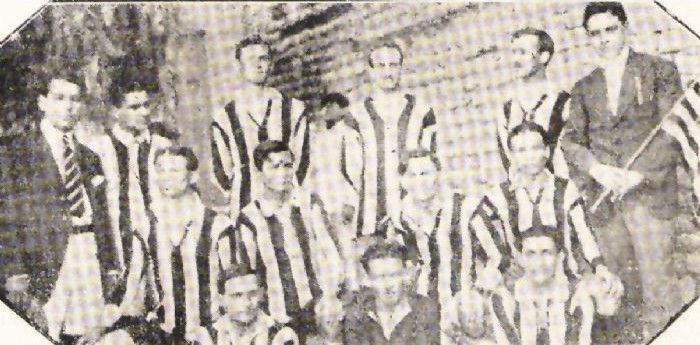
The first football team of the club.

The club was founded in 1890 as "Club de Esgrima" (Fencing Club) with Dr. Carlos Ponce as its first president. In 1893 a group of members came up with new ideas, proposing to encourage the practice of other sports, mainly basque pelota. Therefore, the club was renamed "Club de Pelota". In 1894 the club leaders acquired a land in Mendoza.

In 1902, several departments were created, including the football section. For that purpose the club asked the Government of Mendoza a land in Parque General San Martín, which gave 5 hectares. That same year the club changed its name to "Club Social de Gimnasia y Esgrima", creating two divisions: one of them taking over sports such as gymnastics, martial arts, fencing among others. The other division focused on football only.

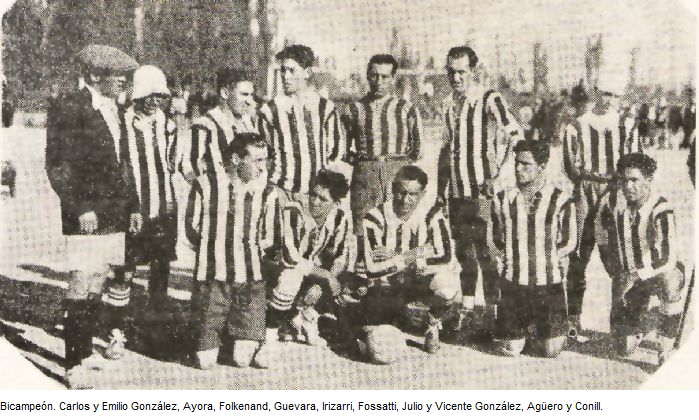
Gimnasia y Esgrima in 1923

In 1910 the club toured outside the Province for the first time, playing a match against Club Atlético Sanjuanino in San Juan province. Gimnasia y Esgrima won the match by 2–0.

On July 13, 1913, the team played its first Mendocino derby facing Independiente Rivadavia.

In 1917 Gimnasia y Esgrima played other friendly matches in Córdoba Province previously to arrive to Buenos Aires in 1921, when played Huracán and Boca Juniors. In 1922 Gimnasia was the first team to win the Mendoza Regional league tournament. One year later, Gimnasia y Esgrima crowned champion again, being the first club of Mendoza to win two consecutive championships. The squad won a playoff game against Independiente Rivadavia after both teams finished in the first place at the end of the season.

The squad would win the league again in 1931 and 1933. One year later, the Lobo inaugurated the first stadium in Mendoza Province, playing a friendly match against Gimnasia y Esgrima de Santa Fe. The match finished in a 2–2 draw. Gimnasia y Esgrima won new regional titles in 1937 and 1939.

Victor Legrotaglie, for whom the club's stadium Estadio Victor Legrotaglie is named after, played for the club in four different stints from 1953 to 1973.

== Players ==
=== Current squad ===
As of 23 September 2026 Note: Flags indicate national team as defined under FIFA eligibility rules; some limited exceptions apply. Players may hold more than one non-FIFA nationality.

No.	Pos.	Nation	Player
2	DF	ARG	Diego Mondino (captain)
3	DF	ARG	Matías Recalde
4	DF	ARG	Ezequiel Muñoz
5	MF	ARG	Nahuel Barboza
6	DF	ARG	Imanol González
7	FW	ARG	Luciano Cingolani
8	MF	ARG	Matías Vargas
10	FW	ARG	Nicolás Romano
11	FW	ARG	Santiago Rodríguez (on loan from Argentinos Juniors)
15	FW	ARG	Ulises Sánchez (on loan from Belgrano)
16	DF	ARG	Germán Guiffrey
17	FW	ARG	Ignacio Sabatini
19	MF	ARG	Julián Ceballos (on loan from Boca Juniors)
20	MF	ARG	Tomás Ortiz (on loan from Defensa y Justicia)
21	MF	ARG	Fermín Antonini

No.	Pos.	Nation	Player
22	DF	PAR	Juan Franco
23	GK	ARG	César Rigamonti
24	DF	ARG	Franco Saavedra
26	FW	ARG	Facundo Lencioni
27	FW	PAR	Blas Armoa (on loan from Tigre)
28	MF	ARG	Tomás O'Connor (on loan from Rosario Central)
29	FW	ITA	Agustín Módica
30	MF	ARG	Esteban Fernández (on loan from Arsenal de Sarandí)
31	GK	ARG	Lautaro Petruchi
32	DF	ARG	Luciano Paredes (on loan from Deportivo Maipú)
33	FW	ARG	Brian Andrada
35	FW	ARG	Valentino Simoni (on loan from Boca Juniors)
36	DF	ARG	Ismael Cortéz
41	DF	ARG	Gerónimo Patritti
42	DF	ARG	Lautaro Carrera (on loan from Instituto)

=== Reserve squad ===
Note: Flags indicate national team as defined under FIFA eligibility rules; some limited exceptions apply. Players may hold more than one non-FIFA nationality.

No.	Pos.	Nation	Player
40	FW	ARG	Julián Moya

=== Out on loan ===
Note: Flags indicate national team as defined under FIFA eligibility rules; some limited exceptions apply. Players may hold more than one non-FIFA nationality.

No.	Pos.	Nation	Player
3	DF	ARG	Maximiliano Padilla (at Central Norte until 31 December 2026)
5	DF	ARG	Matías Muñoz (at Colón until 31 December 2026)
7	MF	ARG	Enzo Gaggi (at Chaco For Ever until 31 December 2026)

No.	Pos.	Nation	Player
10	FW	ARG	Leandro Ciccolini (at Defensores de Belgrano until 31 December 2026)
12	GK	ARG	Tomás Giménez (at Colón until 31 December 2026)

== Honours ==
=== National ===
- Primera Nacional (1): 2025
- Torneo Federal A (1): 2014
- Torneo Argentino B (2): 2005–06, 2013–14

=== Regional ===
Liga Mendocina

- Primera A (20): 1922, 1923, 1931, 1933, 1937, 1939, 1949, 1952, 1964, 1969, 1974, 1977, 1980, 1981, 1982, 1983, 1986, 1991, 1997–98, 2001
- Primera B (1): 1998
- Copa Competencia (3): 1923, 1933, 1938
