= 2019–20 Arsenal de Sarandí season =

Arsenal de Sarandí
2019–20 season
- President: Julio Ricardo Grondona
- Manager: Sergio Rondina
- Stadium: Estadio Julio Humberto Grondona
- Copa Argentina: Round of 32
- Top goalscorer: League: Joel Soñora (2); All: Joel Soñora (2)

The 2019–20 season is Arsenal de Sarandí's 1st season back in the top division of Argentine football, after promotion from Primera B Nacional. In addition to the Primera División, the club are competing in the Copa Argentina and Copa de la Superliga.

The season generally covers the period from 1 July 2019 to 30 June 2020.

== Review ==
=== Pre-season ===
Ramiro López and Sebastián Lomonaco were the first players revealed to be leaving Arsenal de Sarandí at the start of 2019–20, as they agreed moves in June 2019 to Barracas Central and Godoy Cruz respectively. On 13 June, the club announced that Mauricio Aquino's contract would not be renewed; he soon went to Colegiales. A day later, Arsenal completed their first signing after agreeing terms with Lucas Piovi, who would join from Almagro. Juan Cruz Kaprof (Atlético Tucumán) and Ezequiel Rescaldani (Patronato) joined on 21 June. Daniel Sappa, a 'keeper from Estudiantes (LP), was loaned on 24 June; a clause, which would allow him to return to them after six months, was inserted. 24 June also saw Lautaro Parisi loaned from Primera B Nacional's Guillermo Brown.

Loaned players returned home on 30 June. On 1 July, having trained with the team, Nicolás Giménez (Talleres) and Franco Sbuttoni (Atlético Tucumán) signed for Arsenal. A planned pre-season friendly with Racing Club was cancelled on 2 July, with Talleres replacing the Avellaneda club. They met Banfield for their first pre-season match on 3 July, though would lose after conceding three unanswered goals at the Estadio Florencio Sola. A secondary match-up that day ended scoreless. Ryduan Palermo mutually terminated his contract on 4 July. Argentinos Juniors were Arsenal's opponents in friendlies three and four, with both encounters ending in defeats on 6 July in Buenos Aires. Aníbal Leguizamón moved to Ecuadorian Serie A outfit Emelec on 26 June.

Arsenal beat Independiente twice in friendlies on 10 July, after Fernando Torrent and Alan Soñora goals. Arsenal, on 19 July, revealed Pablo Álvarez was training with the club ahead of a potential move from Huracán. Lanús were fought in exhibition matches on 17 July, on a day that saw one win apiece. Unión Santa Fe loaned Federico Milo from Arsenal on 19 July. Arsenal avoided defeat in friendly matches with Rosario Central, drawing and winning at the Estadio Gigante de Arroyito. Pablo Álvarez penned a deal from Huracán on 22 July.

=== July ===
Arsenal sealed their return to the top-flight of Argentine football with a 1–0 victory over Banfield on 29 July, as Ezequiel Rescaldani converted a penalty to gain them three points. Two days later, Arsenal held a friendly match with Claypole for players who didn't play against Banfield. They won it 3–0 after goals from Juan Cruz Kaprof, Rubén Zamponi and Juan García.

=== August ===
On 1 August, Arsenal revealed that Joel Soñora (Talleres, loan) and Diego Nuñez (San Miguel) were training with the club ahead of potential moves. Both officialized their incomings hours later. Arsenal made it back-to-back wins in the Primera División on 5 August, as they came away from Godoy Cruz's Estadio Malvinas Argentinas with all three points thanks to goals from new signings Nicolás Giménez and Joel Soñora. Arsenal drew and lost to Racing Club in friendlies on 9 August. Arsenal secured nine points from a possible nine in the league on 18 August versus Defensa y Justicia, following strikes by Lautaro Parisi, Gastón Álvarez Suárez and Joel Soñora. Arsenal fell to defeat in a friendly with Atlanta on 19 August, with a back-up line-up losing by three goals at home.

Arsenal's three-match winning streak came to a close on 23 August, as San Lorenzo maintained their own unbeaten run with a 0–2 victory. Arsenal were knocked out of the Copa Argentina on 28 August by Estudiantes (BA), who went three up in thirty minutes.

=== September ===
Arsenal were condemned to a 1–0 loss at the hands of Atlético Tucumán on 1 September.

== Squad ==
Squad No.	Nationality	Name	Position(s)	Date of birth (age)	Signed from
Goalkeepers
1	Argentina	Maximiliano Gagliardo	GK	21 April 1983 (age 43)	Los Andes
12	Argentina	Daniel Sappa	GK	9 February 1995 (age 31)	Estudiantes (LP) (loan)
30	Argentina	Alejandro Rivero	GK	12 June 1998 (age 28)	Academy
	Argentina	Pablo Santillo	GK	7 March 1980 (age 46)	Defensa y Justicia
Defenders
2	Argentina	Fabio Pereyra	DF	31 January 1990 (age 36)	San Jorge
3	Argentina	Emiliano Papa	LB	19 April 1982 (age 44)	Tigre
6	Argentina	Rubén Zamponi	CB	15 July 1986 (age 40)	Crucero del Norte
18	Argentina	Ulises Abreliano	DF	9 April 1998 (age 28)	Academy
20	Argentina	Leonardo Marchi	DF	17 September 1996 (age 30)	Academy
22	Argentina	Pablo Álvarez	RB	17 April 1984 (age 42)	Huracán
26	Argentina	Franco Sbuttoni	CB	6 May 1989 (age 37)	Atlético Tucumán
28	Argentina	Horacio Igarzabal	DF	31 May 2000 (age 26)	Academy
32	Argentina	Alexis Salinas	DF	31 May 1997 (age 29)	Academy
33	Argentina	Patricio Luce	DF	26 January 1997 (age 29)	Los Andes
	Argentina	Federico Cataldi	CB	3 May 1996 (age 30)	Academy
Midfielders
4	Argentina	Fernando Torrent	MF	2 October 1991 (age 35)	Defensores de Belgrano
5	Argentina	Emiliano Méndez	CM	15 February 1989 (age 37)	Deportivo Morón
8	Argentina	Jesús Soraire	AM	3 December 1988 (age 37)	San Jorge
10	Argentina	Lucas Necul	AM	21 August 1999 (age 27)	Academy
11	Argentina	Gastón Álvarez Suárez	AM	5 April 1993 (age 33)	Belgrano
13	Argentina	Facundo Kruspzky	MF	28 July 2002 (age 24)	Academy
14	Argentina	Mateo Carabajal	CM	21 February 1997 (age 29)	Academy
15	Argentina	Lucas Piovi	RM	1 January 1992 (age 34)	Almagro
19	United States	Joel Soñora	AM	15 September 1996 (age 30)	Talleres (loan)
21	Argentina	Leonel Picco	MF	22 October 1998 (age 28)	Academy
24	Argentina	Alejo Antilef	MF	20 July 1998 (age 28)	Academy
25	Argentina	Ramiro Balbuena	MF	28 February 2000 (age 26)	Academy
29	Argentina	Lionel Laborda	MF	3 March 1999 (age 27)	Boca Juniors (loan)
31	Argentina	Nicolás Giménez	AM	16 January 1996 (age 30)	Talleres
	Spain Argentina	Lucas Coyette	AM	22 May 1998 (age 28)	Academy
	Argentina	Diego Nuñez	CM	10 February 1990 (age 36)	San Miguel
Forwards
7	Argentina	Facundo Pons	FW	22 November 1995 (age 30)	Juventud Pueyrredon
9	Argentina	Juan García	FW	14 November 1992 (age 33)	Banfield
16	Argentina	Lautaro Parisi	FW	22 March 1994 (age 32)	Guillermo Brown (loan)
17	Argentina	Juan Cruz Kaprof	RW	12 March 1995 (age 31)	Atlético Tucumán
23	Argentina	Ezequiel Rescaldani	CF	11 June 1992 (age 34)	Patronato
27	Argentina	Ezequiel Cérica	CF	20 October 1986 (age 40)	Los Andes
	Argentina	Gonzalo Gómez	FW	23 February 1998 (age 28)	Academy
Out on loan					Loaned to
	Argentina	Federico Milo	LB	10 January 1992 (age 34)	Unión Santa Fe
	Argentina	Facundo Quintana	CF	28 January 1996 (age 30)	L.D.U. Portoviejo

== Transfers ==
Domestic transfer windows:
3 July 2019 to 24 September 2019
20 January 2020 to 19 February 2020.

=== Transfers in ===
Date from	Position	Nationality	Name	From	Ref.
3 July 2019 (Note: Deal agreed on 14 June 2019)	RM	Argentina	Lucas Piovi	Almagro	
3 July 2019 (Note: Deal agreed on 21 June 2019)	RW	Argentina	Juan Cruz Kaprof	Atlético Tucumán	
3 July 2019 (Note: Deal agreed on 21 June 2019)	CF	Argentina	Ezequiel Rescaldani	Patronato	
3 July 2019 (Note: Deal agreed on 1 July 2019)	AM	Argentina	Nicolás Giménez	Talleres	
3 July 2019 (Note: Deal agreed on 1 July 2019)	CB	Argentina	Franco Sbuttoni	Atlético Tucumán	
22 July 2019	RB	Argentina	Pablo Álvarez	Huracán	
1 August 2019	CM	Argentina	Diego Nuñez	San Miguel	

=== Transfers out ===
Date from	Position	Nationality	Name	To	Ref.
26 June 2019	CB	Argentina	Aníbal Leguizamón	Emelec	
3 July 2019 (Note: Deal agreed on 7 June 2019)	AM	Argentina	Ramiro López	Barracas Central	
3 July 2019 (Note: Deal agreed on 11 June 2019)	FW	Argentina	Sebastián Lomonaco	Godoy Cruz	
3 July 2019 (Note: Announced on 26 June 2019)	GK	Argentina	Mauricio Aquino	Colegiales (Note: Released by Arsenal de Sarandí on 30 June.)	
4 July 2019	CF	Argentina	Ryduan Palermo	Released	

=== Loans in ===
Start date	Position	Nationality	Name	From	End date	Ref.
3 July 2019 (Note: Deal agreed on 24 June 2019)	GK	Argentina	Daniel Sappa	Estudiantes (LP)	30 June 2020	
3 July 2019 (Note: Deal agreed on 25 June 2019)	FW	Argentina	Lautaro Parisi	Guillermo Brown	30 June 2020	
1 August 2019	AM	Argentina	Joel Soñora	Talleres	30 June 2020	

=== Loans out ===
Start date	Position	Nationality	Name	To	End date	Ref.
19 July 2019	LB	Argentina	Federico Milo	Unión Santa Fe	30 June 2020	

== Friendlies ==
=== Pre-season ===
Arsenal de Sarandí announced five pre-season friendlies on 11 June 2019, with the club setting encounters with Banfield, Argentinos Juniors, Independiente, Racing Club and Lanús; to be played between 3 July and 17 July. The cancellation of the Racing Club friendly allowed them to schedule a match with Talleres in its place. However, the Talleres fixture was also cancelled due to bad weather. A game away to Rosario Central was later added.

Win Draw Loss

3 July 2019 Friendly	Banfield	3–0	Arsenal de Sarandí	Banfield, Argentina
	N. Bertolo; C. Bravo; M. Payero	Arsenal de Sarandí; Olé		Stadium: Estadio Florencio Sola

3 July 2019 Friendly	Banfield	0–0	Arsenal de Sarandí	Banfield, Argentina
		Arsenal de Sarandí; Olé		Stadium: Estadio Florencio Sola

6 July 2019 Friendly	Argentinos Juniors	1–0	Arsenal de Sarandí	Buenos Aires, Argentina
	G. Hauche 25'	Argentinos Juniors; TyC Sports		Stadium: Estadio Diego Armando Maradona; Attendance: 0 (Note: Behind closed doors.)

6 July 2019 Friendly	Argentinos Juniors	1–0	Arsenal de Sarandí	Buenos Aires, Argentina
	E. Gómez 3' (pen.)	Argentinos Juniors; IAM Noticias		Stadium: Estadio Diego Armando Maradona; Attendance: 0 (Note: Behind closed doors.)

10 July 2019 Friendly	Independiente	0–1	Arsenal de Sarandí	Avellaneda, Argentina
		Arsenal de Sarandí; TyC Sports; 60 min. match	F. Torrent	Stadium: Estadio Libertadores de América; Attendance: 0 (Note: Behind closed doors.)

10 July 2019 Friendly	Independiente	0–1	Arsenal de Sarandí	Avellaneda, Argentina
		Arsenal de Sarandí; TyC Sports; 60 min. match	A. Soñora	Stadium: Estadio Libertadores de América; Attendance: 0 (Note: Behind closed doors.)

13 July 2019 Friendly	Arsenal de Sarandí	Cancelled	Racing Club	Argentina
		Arsenal de Sarandí

13 July 2019 Friendly	Arsenal de Sarandí	Cancelled	Talleres	Buenos Aires, Argentina
		Mundo D - La Voz

17 July 2019 Friendly	Lanús	2–1	Arsenal de Sarandí	Lanús, Argentina
	R. García Guerreño; M. Donato	Arsenal de Sarandí; TyC Sports; 70 min. match	E. Rescaldani	Stadium: Estadio Ciudad de Lanús – Néstor Díaz Pérez; Referee: Alan González (Argentina)

17 July 2019 Friendly	Lanús	0–2	Arsenal de Sarandí	Lanús, Argentina
		Arsenal de Sarandí	L. Parisi; U. Abreliano	Stadium: Estadio Ciudad de Lanús – Néstor Díaz Pérez

20 July 2019 Friendly	Rosario Central	1–1	Arsenal de Sarandí	Rosario, Argentina
	L. Gil 2'	Rosario Central; TyC Sports	N. Giménez 27'	Stadium: Estadio Gigante de Arroyito

20 July 2019 Friendly	Rosario Central	1–2	Arsenal de Sarandí	Rosario, Argentina
	A. Marinelli 64'	Rosario Central; TyC Sports	E. Cérica 15'; L. Parisi 47'	Stadium: Estadio Gigante de Arroyito

=== Mid-season ===
Arsenal scheduled a friendly with Claypole for 31 July, with it allowing players who didn't feature in their Primera División opener against Banfield two days prior. Arsenal held a fixture on 9 August in their city with Racing Club at Predio Tita Mattiussi; the latter club's training ground. An encounter with Atlanta was also set. They'd take a trip to Vélez Sarsfield on 6 September.

Win Draw Loss

31 July 2019 Friendly	Arsenal de Sarandí	3–0	Claypole	Sarandí, Argentina
	J. Kaprof; R. Zamponi; J. García	Arsenal de Sarandí; Mundo Ascenso; 70 min. match		Stadium: Estadio Julio Humberto Grondona

9 August 2019 Friendly	Racing Club	0–0	Arsenal de Sarandí	Sarandí, Argentina
10:30 GMT-3		Racing Club; El Intransigente; 45 min. match		Stadium: Predio Tita Mattiussi; Attendance: 0 (Note: Behind closed doors.)

9 August 2019 Friendly	Racing Club	1–0	Arsenal de Sarandí	Sarandí, Argentina
	E. Cardozo	Racing Club; El Intransigente; 45 min. match		Stadium: Predio Tita Mattiussi; Attendance: 0 (Note: Behind closed doors.)

19 August 2019 Friendly	Arsenal de Sarandí	0–3	Atlanta	Sarandí, Argentina
10:30 GMT-3		Arsenal de Sarandí; Mundo Ascenso; 70 min. match	L. Marinucci; M. Molina; M. Astina	Stadium: Estadio Julio Humberto Grondona

6 September 2019 Friendly	Vélez Sarsfield	–	Arsenal de Sarandí	Ituzaingó, Argentina
				Stadium: Villa Olímpica

== Competitions ==
=== Primera División ===
==== League table ====
Pos	Team	Pld	W	D	L	GF	GA	GD	Pts
9	Rosario Central	23	9	9	5	31	29	+2	36
10	Newell's Old Boys	23	9	8	6	33	25	+8	35
11	Arsenal	23	9	7	7	37	32	+5	34
12	Talleres (C)	23	10	4	9	34	30	+4	34
13	Estudiantes (LP)	23	8	6	9	23	22	+1	30

Source: AFA
Rules for classification: 1) points; 2) play-off (only if needed to decide championship); 3) goal difference; 4) goals scored; 5) head-to-head points; 6) head-to-head goal difference; 7) head-to-head goals scored.

==== Relegation table ====
Pos	Team	2017–18 Pts	2018–19 Pts	2019–20 Pts	Total Pts	Total Pld	Avg	Relegation
1	Boca Juniors	58	51	11	120	57	2.105	
2	Racing	45	57	6	108	57	1.895	
3	Arsenal	0	0	9	9	5	1.8	
4	Defensa y Justicia	44	53	4	101	57	1.772	
5	River Plate	45	45	8	98	57	1.719	

Source: AFA

==== Results summary ====
Overall								Home						Away					
Pld	W	D	L	GF	GA	GD	Pts	W	D	L	GF	GA	GD	W	D	L	GF	GA	GD
5	3	0	2	6	3	+3	9	1	0	1	1	2	−1	2	0	1	5	1	+4

Last updated: 1 September 2019.
Source: Soccerway

==== Matches ====
The fixtures for the 2019–20 campaign were released on 10 July.

Win Draw Loss

29 July 2019 1	Arsenal de Sarandí	1–0	Banfield	Sarandí, Argentina
19:00 GMT-3	E. Rescaldani 44' (pen.)	Arsenal de Sarandí; Infobae; Soccerway		Stadium: Estadio Julio Humberto Grondona; Referee: Hernán Mastrángelo (Argentina)

5 August 2019 2	Godoy Cruz	0–2	Arsenal de Sarandí	Mendoza, Argentina
21:10 GMT-3		Arsenal de Sarandí; Infobae; Soccerway	N. Giménez 12'; J. Soñora 90+3'	Stadium: Estadio Malvinas Argentinas; Referee: Patricio Loustau (Argentina)

18 August 2019 3	Defensa y Justicia	0–3	Arsenal de Sarandí	Buenos Aires, Argentina
15:30 GMT-3		Arsenal de Sarandí; Infobae; Soccerway	L. Parisi 10'; G. Álvarez Suárez 37'; J. Soñora 74'	Stadium: Estadio Norberto "Tito" Tomaghello; Referee: Fernando Espinoza (Argentina)

23 August 2019 4	Arsenal de Sarandí	0–2	San Lorenzo	Sarandí, Argentina
21:00 GMT-3		Arsenal de Sarandí; Infobae; Soccerway	J. Ramírez 33'; N. Blandi 44'	Stadium: Estadio Julio Humberto Grondona; Referee: Facundo Tello (Argentina)

1 September 2019 5	Atlético Tucumán	1–0	Arsenal de Sarandí	San Miguel de Tucumán, Argentina
11:00 GMT-3	M. Ortiz 20'	Arsenal de Sarandí; Infobae; Soccerway		Stadium: Estadio Monumental José Fierro; Referee: Ariel Penel (Argentina)

6	Arsenal de Sarandí	–	Unión Santa Fe	Sarandí, Argentina
				Stadium: Estadio Julio Humberto Grondona

=== Copa Argentina ===
Arsenal were paired with Estudiantes (BA) in the Copa Argentina round of thirty-two.

Win Draw Loss

28 August 2019 R32	Arsenal de Sarandí	2–3	Estudiantes (BA)	Buenos Aires, Argentina
19:10 GMT-3	J. García 38'; E. Cérica 90+4'	Arsenal de Sarandí; La Nación; Soccerway	P. Impini 6'; H. Silva 14'; L. Campana 30'	Stadium: Estadio Alfredo Beranger; Referee: Fernando Echenique (Argentina)

=== Copa de la Superliga ===
Win Draw Loss

	–
00:00 GMT-3

== Squad statistics ==
=== Appearances and goals ===
No.	Pos.	Nationality	Name	League		Cup		League Cup		Continental		Total		Discipline		Ref
No.	Pos.	Nationality	Name	Apps	Goals	Apps	Goals	Apps	Goals	Apps	Goals	Apps	Goals	Yellow card	Red card	Ref
1	GK	Argentina	Maximiliano Gagliardo	5	0	0	0	0	0	—		5	0	0	0	
2	DF	Argentina	Fabio Pereyra	5	0	1	0	0	0	—		6	0	2	0	
3	LB	Argentina	Emiliano Papa	5	0	1	0	0	0	—		6	0	1	0	
4	MF	Argentina	Fernando Torrent	4(1)	0	1	0	0	0	—		5(1)	0	0	0	
5	CM	Argentina	Emiliano Méndez	2	0	1	0	0	0	—		3	0	0	0	
6	CB	Argentina	Rubén Zamponi	0	0	1	0	0	0	—		1	0	0	0	
7	FW	Argentina	Facundo Pons	1(1)	0	0	0	0	0	—		1(1)	0	0	0	
8	AM	Argentina	Jesús Soraire	2(2)	0	1	0	0	0	—		3(2)	0	0	0	
9	FW	Argentina	Juan García	0(1)	0	1	1	0	0	—		1(1)	1	0	0	
10	AM	Argentina	Lucas Necul	0	0	0	0	0	0	—		0	0	0	0	
11	AM	Argentina	Gastón Álvarez Suárez	4	1	1	0	0	0	—		5	1	2	1	
12	GK	Argentina	Daniel Sappa	0	0	1	0	0	0	—		1	0	0	0	
13	MF	Argentina	Facundo Kruspzky	0	0	0	0	0	0	—		0	0	0	0	
14	CM	Argentina	Mateo Carabajal	1	0	0	0	0	0	—		1	0	0	0	
15	RM	Argentina	Lucas Piovi	4(1)	0	0	0	0	0	—		4(1)	0	2	0	
16	FW	Argentina	Lautaro Parisi	4(1)	1	0	0	0	0	—		4(1)	1	0	0	
17	RW	Argentina	Juan Cruz Kaprof	0(3)	0	1	0	0	0	—		1(3)	0	1	0	
18	DF	Argentina	Ulises Abreliano	0	0	0	0	0	0	—		0	0	0	0	
19	AM	United States	Joel Soñora	3(1)	2	1	0	0	0	—		4(1)	2	0	0	
20	DF	Argentina	Leonardo Marchi	0	0	0	0	0	0	—		0	0	0	0	
21	MF	Argentina	Leonel Picco	0	0	0	0	0	0	—		0	0	0	0	
22	RB	Argentina	Pablo Álvarez	0	0	0	0	0	0	—		0	0	0	0	
23	CF	Argentina	Ezequiel Rescaldani	5	1	0	0	0	0	—		5	1	2	0	
24	MF	Argentina	Alejo Antilef	0(1)	0	1	0	0	0	—		1(1)	0	0	0	
25	MF	Argentina	Ramiro Balbuena	0	0	0	0	0	0	—		0	0	0	0	
26	CB	Argentina	Franco Sbuttoni	5	0	0	0	0	0	—		5	0	1	0	
27	CF	Argentina	Ezequiel Cérica	0(3)	0	1	1	0	0	—		1(3)	1	0	0	
28	DF	Argentina	Horacio Igarzabal	0	0	0	0	0	0	—		0	0	0	0	
29	MF	Argentina	Lionel Laborda	0	0	0	0	0	0	—		0	0	0	0	
30	GK	Argentina	Alejandro Rivero	0	0	0	0	0	0	—		0	0	0	0	
31	AM	Argentina	Nicolás Giménez	5	1	1	0	0	0	—		6	1	2	0	
32	DF	Argentina	Alexis Salinas	0	0	0	0	0	0	—		0	0	0	0	
33	DF	Argentina	Patricio Luce	0	0	0	0	0	0	—		0	0	0	0	
–	CB	Argentina	Federico Cataldi	0	0	0	0	0	0	—		0	0	0	0	
–	LB	Argentina	Federico Milo	0	0	0	0	0	0	—		0	0	0	0	
–	AM	Spain Argentina	Lucas Coyette	0	0	0	0	0	0	—		0	0	0	0	
–	FW	Argentina	Gonzalo Gómez	0	0	0	0	0	0	—		0	0	0	0	
–	CM	Argentina	Diego Nuñez	0	0	0	0	0	0	—		0	0	0	0	
–	CF	Argentina	Facundo Quintana	0	0	0	0	0	0	—		0	0	0	0	
–	GK	Argentina	Pablo Santillo	0	0	0	0	0	0	—		0	0	0	0	
Own goals				—	0	—	0	—	0	—		—	0	—	—	—

Statistics accurate as of 1 September 2019.

=== Goalscorers ===
Rank	Pos	No.	Nat	Name	League	Cup	League Cup	Continental	Total	Ref
1	AM	19	Argentina	Joel Soñora	2	0	0	–	2	
2	CF	23	Argentina	Ezequiel Rescaldani	1	0	0	–	1	
2	AM	31	Argentina	Nicolás Giménez	1	0	0	–	1	
2	FW	16	Argentina	Lautaro Parisi	1	0	0	–	1	
2	AM	11	Argentina	Gastón Álvarez Suárez	1	0	0	–	1	
2	FW	9	Argentina	Juan García	0	1	0	–	1	
2	CF	27	Argentina	Ezequiel Cérica	0	1	0	–	1	
Own goals					0	0	0	–	0	
Totals					6	2	0	–	8	—
