= Jorge De Maio =

Argentine professional footballer

Personal information
- Full name: Jorge Ariel De Maio
- Date of birth: 7 September 1982 (age 44)
- Place of birth: Florida, Argentina
- Height: 1.76 m (5 ft 9 in)
- Position: Left-back

Team information
- Current team: Colegiales

Senior career*
| Years | Team | Apps | (Gls) |
| 2002–2005 | Colegiales | 27 | (3) |
| 2005–2009 | Acassuso | 83 | (1) |
| 2009–2010 | Tristán Suárez | 9 | (0) |
| 2010–2014 | Comunicaciones | 94 | (0) |
| 2014–2017 | Villa Dálmine | 84 | (1) |
| 2017–2018 | Talleres | 31 | (0) |
| 2018– | Colegiales | 18 | (1) |
- * Club domestic league appearances and goals as of 22:53, 5 May 2019 (UTC)

Jorge Ariel De Maio (born 7 September 1982) is an Argentine professional footballer who plays as a left-back for Colegiales.

== Career ==
De Maio's career started with Colegiales in Primera C Metropolitana. The club won the 2002–03 league title, therefore gaining promotion to Primera B Metropolitana; though they'd be instantly relegated back down. In 2005, after three goals in twenty-seven appearances for Colegiales, De Maio moved to fellow fourth tier team Acassuso. He appeared forty-two times in two seasons, on the way to experiencing his second career promotion in 2006–07. He remained in Boulogne Sur Mer for two further campaigns, prior to leaving in 2009 to Tristán Suárez. On 30 June 2010, Comunicaciones signed De Maio. Ninety-four matches came across four years.

Primera B Metropolitana team Villa Dálmine became De Maio's fifth club in June 2014. He made his debut on 8 August versus Almirante Brown, which was followed by his first goal on his sixtieth appearance in a 6–4 loss to Nueva Chicago in April 2016. After four seasons, three of which in Primera B Nacional after 2014 promotion, with Villa Dálmine, De Maio subsequently spent the 2017–18 campaign in Primera B Metropolitana with Talleres. On 4 July 2018, De Maio completed a return to Colegiales.

== Career statistics ==
As of 5 May 2019.

Appearances and goals by club, season and competition
| Club | Season | League | | | Cup | | League Cup | | Continental | | Other | | Total | |
| Club | Season | Division | Apps | Goals | Apps | Goals | Apps | Goals | Apps | Goals | Apps | Goals | Apps | Goals |
|---|---|---|---|---|---|---|---|---|---|---|---|---|---|---|
| Tristán Suárez | 2009–10 | Primera B Metropolitana | 9 | 0 | 0 | 0 | — | | — | | 0 | 0 | 9 | 0 |
| Comunicaciones | 2012–13 | Primera B Metropolitana | 29 | 0 | 0 | 0 | — | | — | | 0 | 0 | 29 | 0 |
| Comunicaciones | 2013–14 | Primera B Metropolitana | 23 | 0 | 0 | 0 | — | | — | | 0 | 0 | 23 | 0 |
| Comunicaciones | Total | | 52 | 0 | 0 | 0 | — | | — | | 0 | 0 | 52 | 0 |
| Villa Dálmine | 2014 | Primera B Metropolitana | 19 | 0 | 0 | 0 | — | | — | | 4 (Note: Appearance(s) in the Primera B Metropolitana play-offs) | 0 | 23 | 0 |
| Villa Dálmine | 2015 | Primera B Nacional | 27 | 0 | 1 | 0 | — | | — | | 0 | 0 | 28 | 0 |
| Villa Dálmine | 2016 | Primera B Nacional | 17 | 1 | 0 | 0 | — | | — | | 0 | 0 | 17 | 1 |
| Villa Dálmine | 2016–17 | Primera B Nacional | 21 | 0 | 1 | 0 | — | | — | | 0 | 0 | 22 | 0 |
| Villa Dálmine | Total | | 84 | 1 | 2 | 0 | — | | — | | 4 | 0 | 90 | 1 |
| Talleres | 2017–18 | Primera B Metropolitana | 31 | 0 | 0 | 0 | — | | — | | 0 | 0 | 31 | 0 |
| Colegiales | 2018–19 | Primera B Metropolitana | 18 | 1 | 0 | 0 | — | | — | | 0 | 0 | 18 | 1 |
| Career total | | | 194 | 2 | 2 | 0 | — | | — | | 4 | 0 | 200 | 2 |

== Honours ==
Colegiales

- Primera C Metropolitana: 2002–03

Acassuso

- Primera C Metropolitana: 2006–07
