= Sergio Sosa =

Argentine footballer

Personal information
- Full name: Sergio Candelario Sosa
- Date of birth: 15 March 1994 (age 32)
- Place of birth: San Martín, Argentina
- Height: 1.78 m (5 ft 10 in)
- Position: Forward

Team information
- Current team: Berazategui

Youth career
- Estudiantes

Senior career*
Years	Team	Apps	(Gls)
2013–2015	Estudiantes	41	(16)
2015–2018	Atlético de Rafaela	8	(0)
2016	→ Los Andes (loan)	12	(1)
2017	→ Independiente Rivadavia (loan)	11	(0)
2017–2018	→ Acassuso (loan)	25	(2)
2019–	Berazategui	0	(0)
- * Club domestic league appearances and goals as of 19 March 2019

Sergio Candelario Sosa (born 15 March 1994) is an Argentine professional footballer who plays as a forward for Berazategui.

== Career ==
Sosa's career started in 2013 with Primera B Metropolitana club Estudiantes, he played in forty-one matches across two seasons (2013–14 and 2014) for the club and scored sixteen goals. In January 2015, Sosa completed a move to Argentine Primera División side Atlético de Rafaela. He made his debut in the league on 15 February against Argentinos Juniors. He made seven more appearances in 2015 but failed to score. Ahead of the 2016 season, Sosa joined Los Andes on loan. He scored one goal in twelve matches before returning to Rafaela.

In January 2017, Sosa joined Primera B Nacional side Independiente Rivadavia on loan. He featured in twelve matches in all competitions. In September 2017, Sosa was loaned to Primera B Metropolitana side Acassuso. He scored his first goal in his eighth appearance, versus Comunicaciones on 17 October.

Sosa joined Berazategui in January 2019.

== Career statistics ==
As of 5 September 2018.

Club statistics
Club	Season	League			Cup (Note: Includes the Copa Argentina)		League Cup		Continental		Other		Total	
Club	Season	Division	Apps	Goals	Apps	Goals	Apps	Goals	Apps	Goals	Apps	Goals	Apps	Goals
Estudiantes	2013–14	Primera B Metropolitana	21	6	2	0	—		—		0	0	23	6
Estudiantes	2014	Primera B Metropolitana	19	10	3	2	—		—		1 (Note: One appearance in 2014 Primera B Metropolitana play-offs)	0	23	12
Estudiantes	Total		40	16	5	2	—		—		1	0	46	18
Atlético de Rafaela	2015	Primera División	8	0	0	0	—		—		0	0	8	0
Atlético de Rafaela	2016	Primera División	0	0	0	0	—		—		0	0	0	0
Atlético de Rafaela	2016–17	Primera División	0	0	0	0	—		—		0	0	0	0
Atlético de Rafaela	2017–18	Primera B Nacional	0	0	0	0	—		—		0	0	0	0
Atlético de Rafaela	2018–19	Primera B Nacional	0	0	0	0	—		—		0	0	0	0
Atlético de Rafaela	Total		8	0	0	0	—		—		0	0	8	0
Los Andes (loan)	2016	Primera B Nacional	12	1	0	0	—		—		0	0	12	1
Independiente Rivadavia (loan)	2016–17	Primera B Nacional	11	0	1	0	—		—		0	0	12	0
Acassuso (loan)	2017–18	Primera B Metropolitana	25	2	0	0	—		—		1 (Note: One appearance in 2017–18 Primera B Metropolitana play-offs)	0	26	2
Career total			96	19	6	2	—		—		2	0	104	21
