= Nicolás Cherro =

Argentine professional footballer

Personal information
- Date of birth: 24 April 1987 (age 39)
- Place of birth: Buenos Aires, Argentina
- Height: 1.90 m (6 ft 3 in)
- Position: Centre-back

Senior career*
Years	Team	Apps	(Gls)
2005–2007	Ferro Carril Oeste	2	(0)
2007–2012	Atlanta	155	(15)
2012	Metz	0	(0)
2012	Metz II	8	(0)
2013	Sportivo Desamparados	0	(0)
2013–2015	Tristán Suárez	0	(0)
2016–2017	Fénix	43	(6)
2017–2018	Villa Dálmine	1	(0)
2018–2019	Atlanta	31	(2)
Total		240	(23)
- * Club domestic league appearances and goals

Nicolás Cherro (born 24 April 1987) is an Argentine former professional footballer who played as a centre-back.

== Career ==
Cherro's senior career began in 2005 with Ferro Carril Oeste, prior to joining Atlanta of Primera B Metropolitana in 2007. After four seasons, as he featured one hundred and forty-two times and scored fifteen goals, the club won promotion to Primera B Nacional for the 2011–12 campaign. They were immediately relegated, with Cherro departing after appearing for the final time against Gimnasia y Esgrima in April 2012. In the succeeding July, Cherro moved to Championnat National side Metz. He didn't appear in the league but played twice in the Coupe de France. He made eight appearances for the reserves in the French fourth tier.

Cherro returned to Argentina in 2013, subsequently having spells with Sportivo Desamparados and Tristán Suárez - though didn't feature competitively for either. 2016 saw Primera B Metropolitana's Fénix sign Cherro. He scored a brace on his debut, netting in a 5–1 victory over UAI Urquiza on 8 February 2016. He scored a further four goals in the following 2016–17 season. Cherro spent the 2017–18 Primera B Nacional with Villa Dálmine but appeared just twice, as a starter versus Independiente Rivadavia and off the bench against San Martín. In July 2018, Cherro rejoined Primera B Metropolitana's Atlanta.

Cherro retired from professional football on 11 July 2019, weeks after winning promotion with the club to Primera B Nacional.

== Career statistics ==
Appearances and goals by club, season and competition
Club	Season	League			Cup		League Cup		Continental		Other		Total	
Club	Season	Division	Apps	Goals	Apps	Goals	Apps	Goals	Apps	Goals	Apps	Goals	Apps	Goals
Ferro Carril Oeste	2005–06	Primera B Nacional	2	0	0	0	—		—		0	0	2	0
Ferro Carril Oeste	2006–07	Primera B Nacional	0	0	0	0	—		—		0	0	0	0
Ferro Carril Oeste	Total		2	0	0	0	—		—		0	0	2	0
Atlanta	2011–12	Primera B Nacional	13	0	0	0	—		—		0	0	13	0
Metz	2012–13	Championnat National	0	0	2	0	—		—		0	0	2	0
Metz II	2012–13	CFA	8	0	0	0	—		—		0	0	8	0
Sportivo Desamparados	2012–13	Torneo Argentino A	0	0	0	0	—		—		0	0	0	0
Tristán Suárez	2013–14	Primera B Metropolitana	0	0	0	0	—		—		0	0	0	0
Tristán Suárez	2014	Primera B Metropolitana	0	0	0	0	—		—		0	0	0	0
Tristán Suárez	2015	Primera B Metropolitana	0	0	0	0	—		—		0	0	0	0
Tristán Suárez	Total		0	0	0	0	—		—		0	0	0	0
Fénix	2016	Primera B Metropolitana	10	2	0	0	—		—		0	0	10	2
Fénix	2016–17	Primera B Metropolitana	33	4	0	0	—		—		0	0	33	4
Fénix	Total		43	6	0	0	—		—		0	0	43	6
Villa Dálmine	2017–18	Primera B Nacional	1	0	0	0	—		—		1 (Note: Appearance(s) in the Primera B Nacional play-offs)	0	2	0
Atlanta	2018–19	Primera B Metropolitana	31	2	1	0	—		—		0	0	32	2
Career total			96	8	3	0	—		—		1	0	100	8

== Honours ==
Atlanta

- Primera B Metropolitana: 2010–11
