= Fernando Otárola =

Argentine-Chilean footballer

Personal information
- Full name: Fernando Andrés Otárola Lastra
- Date of birth: 4 February 1986 (age 40)
- Place of birth: Buenos Aires, Argentina
- Height: 1.77 m (5 ft 10 in)
- Position: Goalkeeper

Team information
- Current team: Agropecuario

Senior career*
Years	Team	Apps	(Gls)
2003–2008	Ferro Carril Oeste	15	(0)
2008–2009	Almirante Brown	2	(0)
2010–2013	Comunicaciones	110	(0)
2013–2014	Chacarita Juniors	37	(0)
2014	Brown de Adrogué	19	(0)
2015	Comunicaciones	37	(0)
2016–2017	Villa Dálmine	15	(0)
2017–2018	Deportes Temuco	0	(0)
2019–2020	Comunicaciones	32	(0)
2021	Gimnasia de Jujuy	34	(0)
2022	Mitre	14	(0)
2022–2023	Defensores de Belgrano	0	(0)
2023	→ Unión La Calera (loan)	4	(0)
2024–	Agropecuario	0	(0)
- * Club domestic league appearances and goals as of 22 January 2024

Fernando Andrés Otárola Lastra (born 4 February 1986) is an Argentine-Chilean footballer who plays as a goalkeeper for Primera Nacional side Agropecuario.

== Career ==
Otárola began his career with Ferro Carril Oeste, making his debut in a 2–2 draw against Godoy Cruz on 15 April 2006.

With an extensive career in his country of birth, Otárola has played for Almirante Brown, Comunicaciones, Chacarita Juniors, Brown de Adrogué, Villa Dálmine, Gimnasia de Jujuy, Mitre and Defensores de Belgrano. As a goalkeeper of Comunicaciones, he beat the record of Rafael Seria with no-goals in February 2020.

From 2017 to 2018, he had a stint with Chilean Primera División side Deportes Temuco. In 2023, he returned to Chile and signed with Unión La Calera on loan from Defensores de Belgrano, alongside his compatriot Alejo Antilef.

In 2024, he returned to Argentina and signed with Agropecuario.

== Personal life ==
Otárola holds dual Argentine-Chilean nationality, since his mother is a Chilean who emigrated to Argentine. His Chilean family is from San Bernardo.
