= Jonathan Figueira =

Argentine professional footballer

Personal information
- Full name: Jonathan Cristian Figueira
- Date of birth: 10 April 1992 (age 34)
- Place of birth: Tigre, Argentina
- Height: 1.77 m (5 ft 10 in)
- Position: Midfielder

Youth career
- Tigre

Senior career*
Years	Team	Apps	(Gls)
2013–2017	Villa Dálmine	62	(4)
2018	Ferrocarril Midland	8	(1)
2018–2019	Atlanta	5	(1)
2019–2020	Deportes Quindío	3	(0)
2020–2021	F.A.D.E.P		
2021	Ciudad Bolívar	13	(0)
2022	Colegiales		
2023	San Martín de Formosa		
- * Club domestic league appearances and goals

Jonathan Cristian Figueira (born 10 April 1992) is an Argentine professional footballer who plays as a midfielder. He is currently without a team.

== Career ==
Figueira's career began with Villa Dálmine; having signed from the Tigre academy. He made five appearances in each of his opening two seasons in Primera B Metropolitana, including for his professional debut on 22 February 2014 versus Estudiantes; his only past experience of senior football was as an unused substitute in a Copa Argentina fixture with Temperley in 2013. In the 2014 campaign, Villa Dálmine won promotion to Primera B Nacional; where he'd appear fifty-four times. He also scored four goals, with the last coming over Brown in June 2017. In early 2018, Figueira joined Primera C Metropolitana's Ferrocarril Midland.

On 16 July 2018, after eight games and one goal for Midland, Figueira sealed a return to Primera B Metropolitana with Atlanta. He made his opening appearances for them in September against Acassuso and Flandria. July 2019 saw Figueira unveiled as a new signing for Categoría Primera B side Deportes Quindío in Colombia. He appeared just three times in 2019; versus Bogotá, Cortuluá and Orsomarso. Figueira departed on 3 July 2020.

He also played in F.A.D.E.P, between October 2020 and the beginning of 2021, Ciudad Bolívar in 2021, Colegiales in 2022 and San Martín de Formosa in 2023.

== Career statistics ==
As of 14 September 2020.

Appearances and goals by club, season and competition
Club	Season	League			Cup		League Cup		Continental		Other		Total	
Club	Season	Division	Apps	Goals	Apps	Goals	Apps	Goals	Apps	Goals	Apps	Goals	Apps	Goals
Villa Dálmine	2013–14	Primera B Metropolitana	5	0	0	0	—		—		0	0	5	0
Villa Dálmine	2014	Primera B Metropolitana	3	0	0	0	—		—		2 (Note: Appearance(s) in the Primera B Metropolitana play-offs)	0	5	0
Villa Dálmine	2015	Primera B Nacional	10	0	0	0	—		—		0	0	10	0
Villa Dálmine	2016	Primera B Nacional	9	2	0	0	—		—		0	0	9	2
Villa Dálmine	2016–17	Primera B Nacional	35	2	1	0	—		—		0	0	36	2
Villa Dálmine	2017–18	Primera B Nacional	0	0	0	0	—		—		0	0	0	0
Villa Dálmine	Total		62	4	1	0	—		—		2	0	65	4
Ferrocarril Midland	2017–18	Primera C Metropolitana	8	1	0	0	—		—		0	0	8	1
Atlanta	2018–19	Primera B Metropolitana	5	1	1	0	—		—		0	0	6	1
Deportes Quindío	2019	Categoría Primera B	3	0	0	0	—		—		0	0	3	0
Career total			78	6	2	0	—		—		2	0	82	6
