= Lautaro Parisi =

Argentine footballer

Personal information
- Full name: Lautaro Joel Parisi
- Date of birth: 22 March 1994 (age 32)
- Place of birth: General Pico, Argentina
- Height: 1.78 m (5 ft 10 in)
- Position: Forward

Team information
- Current team: Ferro Carril Oeste

Youth career
- Academia Griffa
- 2009–2016: Argentinos Juniors

Senior career*
Years	Team	Apps	(Gls)
2016	Argentinos Juniors	0	(0)
2016–2018	Ferro Carril Oeste	40	(12)
2018–2019	Guillermo Brown	22	(7)
2019–2020	Arsenal de Sarandí	10	(1)
2020	Estudiantes RC	3	(0)
2021	Guillermo Brown	17	(2)
2021	Atlético de Rafaela	15	(1)
2022–2023	Estudiantes BA	63	(7)
2023–2024	Gutiérrez SC	0	(0)
2024	Quilmes	31	(9)
2025	San Miguel	13	(2)
2025–	Ferro Carril Oeste	22	(3)
- * Club domestic league appearances and goals as of 18:34, 11 April 2026 (UTC)

Lautaro Joel Parisi (born 22 March 1994) is an Argentine professional footballer who plays as a forward for Ferro Carril Oeste.

== Career ==
Parisi had a stint in the youth systems of Academia Griffa and Argentinos Juniors, who he had a spell in the first-team with though didn't feature. 2016 saw the forward join Ferro Carril Oeste in Torneo Federal A, making his senior bow on 8 October against Defensores de Belgrano prior to netting his opening goals in March 2017 in fixtures with Deportivo Maipú and Independiente. Ten goals followed in the 2017–18 campaign, notably scoring a brace over Deportivo Roca. On 22 July 2018, Parisi joined Primera B Nacional's Guillermo Brown. His first appearance, versus Brown on 26 August, doubled up as his professional league debut.

In July 2019, after seven goals in 2018–19, Parisi completed a move to newly promoted Primera División team Arsenal de Sarandí. He netted his first top-flight goal on 18 August versus Defensa y Justicia, which turned out to be his only goal for the club across eleven matches. In September 2020, Parisi signed a six-month contract with Estudiantes of Primera B Nacional; after rejecting a longer contract from Caballito's Ferro Carril Oeste.

== Personal life ==
Gonzalo Parisi is the brother of Lautaro. They faced each other for the first time on 22 March 2017, as Lautaro's Ferro Carril Oeste lost 1–2 to Gonzalo's Deportivo Maipú, though the former scored his club's only goal.

== Career statistics ==
As of 25 September 2020.

Club statistics
Club	Season	League			Cup		League Cup		Continental		Other		Total	
Club	Season	Division	Apps	Goals	Apps	Goals	Apps	Goals	Apps	Goals	Apps	Goals	Apps	Goals
Ferro Carril Oeste	2016–17	Torneo Federal A	17	2	0	0	—		—		0	0	17	2
Ferro Carril Oeste	2017–18	Torneo Federal A	23	10	2	0	—		—		1 (Note: Appearance(s) in the Torneo Federal A play-offs)	0	26	10
Ferro Carril Oeste	Total		40	12	2	0	—		—		1	0	43	12
Guillermo Brown	2018–19	Primera B Nacional	22	7	0	0	—		—		0	0	22	7
Arsenal de Sarandí	2019–20	Primera División	10	1	1	0	0	0	—		0	0	11	1
Estudiantes	2020–21	Primera B Nacional	0	0	0	0	0	0	—		0	0	0	0
Career total			72	20	3	0	0	0	—		1	0	76	20
