= Juan Manuel García (Argentine footballer) =

Argentine footballer

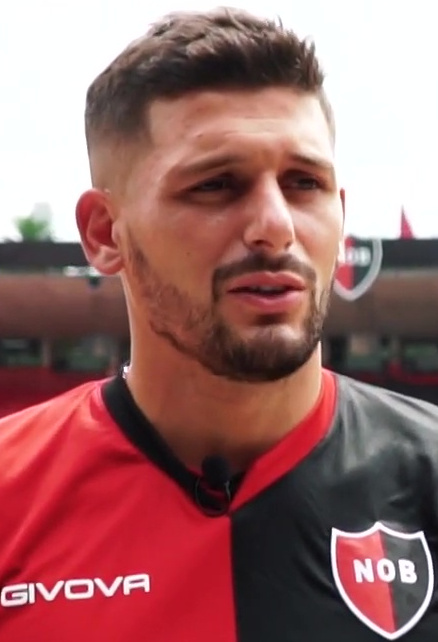
- García in 2022

Personal information
- Date of birth: 14 November 1992 (age 33)
- Place of birth: Tandil, Argentina
- Height: 1.80 m (5 ft 11 in)
- Position: Forward

Team information
- Current team: Panetolikos
- Number: 31

Youth career
- Gimnasia y Esgrima
- Independiente
- –2007: Santamarina
- 2007–2013: Banfield

Senior career*
Years	Team	Apps	(Gls)
2013–2018	Banfield	0	(0)
2013–2015	→ Brown (loan)	73	(13)
2016	→ San Martín (loan)	0	(0)
2016–2017	→ Brown (loan)	39	(13)
2017–2018	→ Ferro Carril Oeste (loan)	17	(1)
2018–2020	Arsenal de Sarandí	28	(9)
2020–2022	Unión Santa Fe	45	(15)
2022–2023	Newell's Old Boys	36	(8)
2023	Huracán	20	(1)
2023–2024	Volos	27	(9)
2024–2026	Newell's Old Boys	33	(3)
2026–	Panetolikos	12	(3)
- * Club domestic league appearances and goals as of 14 June 2026

Juan Manuel García (born 14 November 1992) is an Argentine professional footballer who plays as a forward for Greek Super League club Panetolikos.

== Career ==
García had youth spells with Gimnasia y Esgrima, Independiente, Santamarina and Banfield. He was loaned out in 2013 to Primera B Nacional side Brown, with his Brown and professional debut coming in a league defeat to Douglas Haig on 1 September 2013. Four matches later, García scored the first goal of his career in a 3–3 draw with Unión Santa Fe. He scored two goals in a game for the first time on 2 April 2014 in the Copa Argentina vs. Villa Cubas. Brown were relegated in 2013–14, while Banfield were promoted as champions. He remained with Brown in Primera B Metropolitana for two seasons.

In the first, 2014, he scored once in eighteen matches, but then scored eleven times in thirty-seven games in 2015. He scored in his final Brown appearance of 2015, netting a 94th-minute winner against Deportivo Morón which confirmed the club as title winners. In January 2016, García joined San Martín of the Primera División on loan. However, he returned to Banfield six months later after just one match for San Martín; an appearance in the Copa Argentina versus Instituto. He subsequently rejoined Brown on loan in July 2016. He scored two goals in his first four appearances back with Brown.

He returned to Banfield on 31 July 2017 and was subsequently loaned out again, this time to Ferro Carril Oeste. He scored in his eighth appearance, versus former club Brown; scoring the first goal in a 2–2 draw. García completed a move to Arsenal de Sarandí of Primera B Nacional in July 2018, subsequently netting on his league debut against Gimnasia y Esgrima (J) on 25 August. In two seasons with the club, which included promotion in 2018–19, the forward scored ten goals in thirty appearances in all competitions. In August 2020, García moved across the Primera División to Unión Santa Fe.

On 26 January 2022, García joined Newell's Old Boys on a one-year deal.

== Career statistics ==
As of 23 September 2020.

Club statistics
Club	Season	League			Cup		League Cup		Continental		Other		Total	
Club	Season	Division	Apps	Goals	Apps	Goals	Apps	Goals	Apps	Goals	Apps	Goals	Apps	Goals
Banfield	2013–14	Primera B Nacional	0	0	0	0	—		—		0	0	0	0
Banfield	2014	Primera División	0	0	0	0	—		—		0	0	0	0
Banfield	2015	Primera División	0	0	0	0	—		—		0	0	0	0
Banfield	2016	Primera División	0	0	0	0	—		—		0	0	0	0
Banfield	2016–17	Primera División	0	0	0	0	—		0	0	0	0	0	0
Banfield	2017–18	Primera División	0	0	0	0	—		0	0	0	0	0	0
Banfield	Total		0	0	0	0	—		0	0	0	0	0	0
Brown (loan)	2013–14	Primera B Nacional	18	1	2	2	—		—		0	0	20	3
Brown (loan)	2014	Primera B Metropolitana	18	1	0	0	—		—		0	0	18	1
Brown (loan)	2015	Primera B Metropolitana	37	11	0	0	—		—		0	0	37	11
Brown (loan)	Total		73	13	2	2	—		—		0	0	75	15
San Martín (loan)	2016	Primera División	0	0	1	0	—		—		0	0	1	0
Brown (loan)	2016–17	Primera B Nacional	39	13	1	0	—		—		0	0	40	13
Ferro Carril Oeste (loan)	2017–18	Primera B Nacional	17	1	0	0	—		—		0	0	17	1
Arsenal de Sarandí	2018–19	Primera B Nacional	9	5	0	0	—		—		0	0	9	5
Arsenal de Sarandí	2019–20	Primera División	19	4	2	1	0	0	—		0	0	21	5
Arsenal de Sarandí	Total		28	9	2	1	0	0	—		0	0	30	10
Unión Santa Fe	2020–21	Primera División	0	0	0	0	0	0	—		0	0	0	0
Career total			157	36	6	3	0	0	0	0	0	0	163	39

== Honours ==
Brown

- Primera B Metropolitana: 2015
