= Lionel Laborda =

Argentine footballer

Personal information
- Full name: Lionel Alejandro Nicolás Laborda
- Date of birth: 3 March 1999 (age 27)
- Place of birth: Argentina
- Height: 1.62 m (5 ft 4 in)
- Position: Midfielder

Team information
- Current team: San Telmo

Youth career
- Barcelona La Candela
- Boca Juniors

Senior career*
Years	Team	Apps	(Gls)
2019–2021	Boca Juniors	0	(0)
2019	→ Arsenal Sarandí (loan)	1	(0)
2021	Tigre	0	(0)
2022–	San Telmo	6	(0)
- * Club domestic league appearances and goals as of 19:56, 31 July 2022 (UTC)

Lionel Alejandro Nicolás Laborda (born 3 March 1999) is an Argentine professional footballer who plays as a midfielder for San Telmo.

== Career ==
Laborda was produced by the Boca Juniors academy, they signed him following a two-year spell with Barcelona La Candela. On 29 January 2019, Laborda completed a loan move to Primera B Nacional's Arsenal de Sarandí until the summer 2020. Sergio Rondina picked the midfielder on the substitutes bench for fixtures with Central Córdoba and Almagro in early March 2019, prior to substituting him on during a goalless draw at home to Platense on 11 March. Arsenal was promoted to the Argentine Primera División for the 2019–20 season and since then, Laborda played with Arsenal's reserve team. Laborda was then recalled at the end of 2019.

After a long trial period, Laborda signed a deal with Tigre in August 2021. However, he never played an official game for the club, before leaving in January 2022 to join San Telmo.

== Career statistics ==
As of 24 March 2019.

Appearances and goals by club, season and competition
Club	Season	League			Cup		Continental		Other		Total	
Club	Season	Division	Apps	Goals	Apps	Goals	Apps	Goals	Apps	Goals	Apps	Goals
Boca Juniors	2018–19	Primera División	0	0	0	0	0	0	0	0	0	0
Arsenal de Sarandí (loan)	2018–19	Primera B Nacional	1	0	0	0	—		0	0	1	0
Career total			1	0	0	0	0	0	0	0	1	0
