= Facundo Castet =

Argentine professional footballer

Personal information
- Date of birth: 11 September 1998 (age 28)
- Place of birth: Bragado, Argentina
- Height: 1.75 m (5 ft 9 in)
- Position: Left-back

Team information
- Current team: Colón

Youth career
- Argentinos Juniors
- Bragado Club
- 2013–2018: Sarmiento

Senior career*
Years	Team	Apps	(Gls)
2018–2025	Sarmiento	69	(0)
2022	→ Temperley (loan)	19	(0)
2023	→ Estudiantes RC (loan)	38	(1)
2024	→ Colón (loan)	34	(0)
2025–	Colón	32	(0)
- * Club domestic league appearances and goals as of 18:36, 20 March 2026 (UTC)

Facundo Castet (born 11 September 1998) is an Argentine professional footballer who plays as a left-back for Colón.

== Career ==
Castet began his senior career in the ranks of Sarmiento, a team that signed him from Bragado Club in 2013; who he joined following a stint with Argentinos Juniors. Iván Delfino initially promoted the defender into the first-team during the 2017–18 Primera B Nacional campaign, selecting him on the substitutes bench for home fixtures against Mitre, Instituto and Brown; though he never made it onto the field. He started the opening thirteen fixtures of 2018–19, including for his professional bow versus Olimpo on 26 August 2018; with Castet assisting Nicolás Orsini's winning goal. On 15 May 2022, Castet joined Temperley on loan for the rest of the year.

== Career statistics ==
As of 24 March 2019.

Appearances and goals by club, season and competition
Club	Season	League			Cup		Continental		Other		Total	
Club	Season	Division	Apps	Goals	Apps	Goals	Apps	Goals	Apps	Goals	Apps	Goals
Sarmiento	2017–18	Primera B Nacional	0	0	0	0	—		0	0	0	0
Sarmiento	2018–19	Primera B Nacional	19	0	0	0	—		0	0	19	0
Career total			19	0	0	0	—		0	0	19	0
