= Rubén Zamponi =

Argentine footballer

Personal information
- Full name: Rubén Osvaldo Zamponi
- Date of birth: 15 July 1986 (age 40)
- Place of birth: Morón, Argentina
- Height: 1.87 m (6 ft 1 1/2 in)
- Position: Centre-back

Team information
- Current team: UAI Urquiza

Youth career
- Deportivo Morón

Senior career*
Years	Team	Apps	(Gls)
2003–2005	Deportivo Morón		
2005–2006	Flandria	23	(0)
2006	Deportivo Morón		
2007–2008	Fénix	41	(0)
2008–2010	Excursionistas	79	(4)
2010–2014	San Martín	21	(0)
2012–2013	→ Banfield (loan)	15	(0)
2014–2017	Villa Dálmine	124	(3)
2017–2018	Crucero del Norte	27	(1)
2018–2020	Arsenal de Sarandí	8	(0)
2020–2021	Mitre	30	(2)
2022–	UAI Urquiza	6	(0)
- * Club domestic league appearances and goals as of 18:54, 20 March 2022 (UTC)

Rubén Osvaldo Zamponi (born 15 July 1986) is an Argentine professional footballer who plays as a centre-back for UAI Urquiza.

== Career ==
Zamponi's career began with Deportivo Morón in 2003. Two years later, Zamponi completed a move to Flandria of Primera B Metropolitana. Twenty-three appearances followed during the 2005–06 campaign. He rejoined Deportivo Morón in mid-2016, prior to departing for a second time after signing for Fénix. He made forty-one appearances in Primera C Metropolitana as Fénix finished second, eventually losing in the promotion play-offs to Barracas Central. In 2008, Zamponi joined fellow fourth tier team Excursionistas. He scored the first four league goals of his career with them. Primera B Nacional's San Martín signed Zamponi in 2010.

He made his debut with San Martín on 21 August during a 1–0 over Atlético de Rafaela, which was one of twenty-four matches he played for San Martín between 2010 and 2014; which included a loan spell with Banfield throughout the 2012–13 Primera B Nacional. On 4 February 2014, Zamponi agreed to join Primera B Metropolitana side Villa Dálmine. His first goal for them arrived in their 2014 opener versus Almirante Brown, a season which ended with promotion. After two further goals in eighty-nine more games, Zamponi left for Crucero del Norte in Torneo Federal A in August 2017. A year later, Arsenal de Sarandí signed Zamponi and he played 9 times in their promotion season from the Primera Nacional. After making no appearances and only making the bench 4 times in the Primera División, he was released and joined CA Mitre.

UAI Urquiza

== Career statistics ==
As of 20 November 2018.

Club statistics
Club	Season	League			Cup (Note: Includes the Copa Argentina)		League Cup		Continental		Other		Total	
Club	Season	Division	Apps	Goals	Apps	Goals	Apps	Goals	Apps	Goals	Apps	Goals	Apps	Goals
Flandria	2005–06	Primera B Metropolitana	23	0	0	0	—		—		0	0	23	0
Fénix	2007–08	Primera C Metropolitana	41	0	0	0	—		—		0	0	41	0
San Martín	2010–11	Primera B Nacional	20	0	0	0	—		—		2 (Note: Two appearances in the 2010–11 Primera B Nacional play-offs)	0	22	0
San Martín	2011–12	Primera División	1	0	1	0	—		—		0	0	2	0
San Martín	2012–13	Primera División	0	0	0	0	—		—		0	0	0	0
San Martín	2013–14	Primera B Nacional	0	0	0	0	—		—		0	0	0	0
San Martín	Total		21	0	1	0	—		—		2	0	24	0
Banfield (loan)	2012–13	Primera B Nacional	15	0	1	0	—		—		0	0	16	0
Villa Dálmine	2013–14	Primera B Metropolitana	17	0	0	0	—		—		0	0	17	0
Villa Dálmine	2014	Primera B Metropolitana	20	1	0	0	—		—		4 (Note: Four appearances in the 2014 Primera B Metropolitana play-offs)	0	24	1
Villa Dálmine	2015	Primera B Nacional	37	1	1	0	—		—		0	0	38	1
Villa Dálmine	2016	Primera B Nacional	15	0	0	0	—		—		0	0	15	0
Villa Dálmine	2016–17	Primera B Nacional	35	1	1	0	—		—		0	0	36	1
Villa Dálmine	Total		124	3	2	0	—		—		4	0	130	3
Crucero del Norte	2017–18	Torneo Federal A	21	1	3	0	—		—		6 (Note: Six appearances in the 2017–18 Torneo Federal A play-offs)	0	30	1
Arsenal de Sarandí	2018–19	Primera B Nacional	3	0	0	0	—		—		0	0	3	0
Career total			248	3	7	0	—		—		12	0	267	3
