= Mauricio Aquino =

Argentine footballer

Personal information
- Full name: Mauricio Hernán Aquino
- Date of birth: 27 October 1993 (age 33)
- Place of birth: Jacinto Aráuz, Argentina La Pampa
- Height: 1.86 m (6 ft 1 in)
- Position: Goalkeeper

Team information
- Current team: Defensores Unidos de Zárate
- Number: 12

Youth career
- Boca Juniors ( 5 años ) Inferiores: Independiente Jacinto Arauz
- 2009–2014 Boca Juniors: Arsenal de Sarandí ( 5 años) 2014/ 2018

Senior career*
Years	Team	Apps	(Gls)
	Boca Juniors		(0)
2014/ 2018 Arsenal de Sarandí	Colegiales		(0)
Medal record
B nacional campeón Arsenal de Sarandí B metropolitana Colegiales Campeón Ascenso B nacional con defensores unidos
- * Club domestic league appearances and goals as of 16:30, 18 November 2018 (UTC)

Mauricio Hernán Aquino (born 27 October 1993) is an Argentine professional footballer who plays as a goalkeeper for Colegiales.

== Career ==
Aquino began his career with Independiente Jacinto Arauz, before being signed by Boca Juniors in 2009. In 2014, Aquino completed a move to Arsenal de Sarandí. He was an unused substitute for eleven Argentine Primera División matches between the 2014 and 2016–17 seasons, eventually making his professional debut on 5 May 2018 during a 4–0 victory over Rosario Central. He made three further appearances during the 2017–18 campaign, which Arsenal ended with relegation to Primera B Nacional.

== Career statistics ==
As of 18 November 2018.

Club statistics
Club	Season	League			Cup (Note: Includes the Copa Argentina)		League Cup		Continental (Note: Includes the Copa Sudamericana)		Other		Total	
Club	Season	Division	Apps	Goals	Apps	Goals	Apps	Goals	Apps	Goals	Apps	Goals	Apps	Goals
Arsenal de Sarandí	2014	Primera División	0	0	0	0	—		—		0	0	0	0
Arsenal de Sarandí	2015	Primera División	0	0	0	0	—		0	0	0	0	0	0
Arsenal de Sarandí	2016	Primera División	0	0	0	0	—		—		0	0	0	0
Arsenal de Sarandí	2016–17	Primera División	0	0	0	0	—		0	0	0	0	0	0
Arsenal de Sarandí	2017–18	Primera División	3	0	1	0	—		—		0	0	4	0
Arsenal de Sarandí	2018–19	Primera B Nacional	0	0	0	0	—		—		0	0	0	0
Career total			3	0	1	0	—		0	0	0	0	4	0
