= Ulises Abreliano =

Argentine professional footballer

Personal information
- Full name: Marcos Ulises Abreliano
- Date of birth: 9 April 1998 (age 28)
- Place of birth: Berazategui, Argentina
- Position: Right-back

Team information
- Current team: Almirante Brown

Youth career
- Arsenal de Sarandí

Senior career*
| Years | Team | Apps | (Gls) |
| 2018–2022 | Arsenal de Sarandí | 10 | (0) |
| 2021–2022 | → San Martín T. (loan) | 14 | (0) |
| 2023– | Almirante Brown | 52 | (1) |
- * Club domestic league appearances and goals as of 17:56, 29 June 2025 (UTC)

Marcos Ulises Abreliano (born 9 April 1998) is an Argentine professional footballer who plays as a right-back for Almirante Brown.

== Career ==
Abreliano's career began in the ranks of Arsenal de Sarandí. He made his professional debut in April 2018, featuring for the full duration of an Argentine Primera División loss to Belgrano at El Gigante de Alberdi.

== Career statistics ==
As of 18 November 2018.

Club statistics
| Club | Season | League | | | Cup (Note: Includes the Copa Argentina) | | League Cup | | Continental | | Other | | Total | |
| Club | Season | Division | Apps | Goals | Apps | Goals | Apps | Goals | Apps | Goals | Apps | Goals | Apps | Goals |
|---|---|---|---|---|---|---|---|---|---|---|---|---|---|---|
| Arsenal de Sarandí | 2017–18 | Primera División | 1 | 0 | 0 | 0 | — | | — | | 0 | 0 | 1 | 0 |
| Arsenal de Sarandí | 2018–19 | Primera B Nacional | 1 | 0 | 0 | 0 | — | | — | | 0 | 0 | 1 | 0 |
| Career total | | | 2 | 0 | 0 | 0 | — | | — | | 0 | 0 | 2 | 0 |
