= Ezequiel Cérica =

Argentine footballer

Personal information
- Full name: Ezequiel Adrián Cérica
- Date of birth: 20 October 1986 (age 40)
- Place of birth: Necochea, Argentina
- Height: 1.82 m (5 ft 11 1/2 in)
- Position: Forward

Team information
- Current team: Mitre

Senior career*
Years	Team	Apps	(Gls)
2008–2009	Temperley		
2009–2010	Excursionistas	43	(17)
2010–2011	Talleres	37	(14)
2011	Temperley		
2012–2013	Ferrocarril Midland	59	(25)
2013–2014	Deportivo Morón	20	(1)
2014–2017	Villa Dálmine	100	(24)
2017–2018	Los Andes	21	(4)
2018–2020	Arsenal de Sarandí	31	(3)
2020–	Mitre	40	(12)
- * Club domestic league appearances and goals as of 19:36, 20 March 2022 (UTC)

Ezequiel Adrián Cérica (born 20 October 1986) is an Argentine professional footballer who plays as a forward for CA Mitre.

== Career ==
Cérica's career began with Temperley of Primera B Metropolitana in 2008. A year later, Cérica completed a move to Primera C Metropolitana's Excursionistas. Seventeen goals followed across forty-three matches in the 2009–10 campaign, with Excursionistas losing in the promotion play-off semi-finals to Talleres. Talleres, who subsequently lost in the finals, signed Cérica in June 2010. He scored fourteen goals in his sole season, with his ex-team eliminating his new team in the play-offs. Cérica rejoined Temperley in June 2011, before leaving for Ferrocarril Midland in the following January. Fifty-nine games and twenty-five goals came in tier four.

After two seasons with Ferrocarril Midland, Cérica departed having been signed by Deportivo Morón. He made his debut in a Primera B Metropolitana defeat away to Los Andes on 3 August 2013, which preceded his first goal for the club at the end of September against Fénix. Cérica joined Villa Dálmine ahead of the 2014 Primera B Metropolitana, a campaign which he finished with five goals as they won promotion. In total, he stayed with them for three years whilst scoring at least five goals in four straight seasons; including nine in 2016–17. Cérica agreed to sign for Los Andes in 2017, prior to sealing a transfer to Arsenal de Sarandí in 2018.

== Career statistics ==
As of 22 November 2018.

Club statistics
Club	Season	League			Cup (Note: Includes the Copa Argentina)		League Cup		Continental		Other		Total	
Club	Season	Division	Apps	Goals	Apps	Goals	Apps	Goals	Apps	Goals	Apps	Goals	Apps	Goals
Excursionistas	2009–10	Primera C Metropolitana	43	17	0	0	—		—		0	0	43	17
Talleres	2010–11	Primera C Metropolitana	37	14	0	0	—		—		0	0	37	14
Deportivo Morón	2013–14	Primera B Metropolitana	20	1	2	0	—		—		0	0	22	1
Villa Dálmine	2014	Primera B Metropolitana	13	4	0	0	—		—		4 (Note: Four appearances in the 2014 Primera B Metropolitana play-offs)	1 (Note: One goal in the 2014 Primera B Metropolitana play-offs)	17	5
Villa Dálmine	2015	Primera B Nacional	32	6	1	0	—		—		0	0	33	6
Villa Dálmine	2016	Primera B Nacional	16	5	0	0	—		—		0	0	16	5
Villa Dálmine	2016–17	Primera B Nacional	39	9	1	0	—		—		0	0	40	9
Villa Dálmine	Total		100	24	2	0	—		—		4	1	106	25
Los Andes	2017–18	Primera B Nacional	21	4	0	0	—		—		0	0	21	4
Arsenal de Sarandí	2018–19	Primera B Nacional	7	1	0	0	—		—		0	0	7	1
Career total			228	61	4	0	—		—		4	1	236	62
