= Daniel Sappa =

Argentine footballer

Personal information
- Full name: Claudio Daniel Sappa
- Date of birth: 9 February 1995 (age 31)
- Place of birth: La Plata, Argentina
- Height: 1.93 m (6 ft 4 in)
- Position: Goalkeeper

Youth career
- Estudiantes

Senior career*
Years	Team	Apps	(Gls)
2015–2023	Estudiantes	10	(0)
2019–2020	→ Arsenal Sarandí (loan)	11	(0)
2020–2021	→ Patronato (loan)	0	(0)
2021	→ Belgrano (loan)	0	(0)
2021	→ Arsenal Sarandí (loan)	4	(0)
2022	→ Palestino (loan)	29	(0)
2024	Deportes Iquique	6	(0)
2025–2026	San Miguel	33	(0)
2026	Spartak Kostroma	10	(0)
- * Club domestic league appearances and goals as of 16 May 2026

Claudio Daniel Sappa (born 9 February 1995), known as Daniel Sappa, is an Argentine footballer who plays as a goalkeeper.

== Career statistics ==
As of 16 May 2026

Club	Season	League			Cup		Continental		Other		Total	
Club	Season	Division	Apps	Goals	Apps	Goals	Apps	Goals	Apps	Goals	Apps	Goals
Estudiantes	2016	AFA Liga Profesional de Fútbol	3	0	1	0	—		—		4	0
Estudiantes	2016–17	AFA Liga Profesional de Fútbol	3	0	0	0	0	0	—		3	0
Estudiantes	2017–18	AFA Liga Profesional de Fútbol	1	0	0	0	0	0	—		1	0
Estudiantes	2018–19	AFA Liga Profesional de Fútbol	1	0	0	0	—		—		1	0
Estudiantes	2023	AFA Liga Profesional de Fútbol	2	0	2	0	2 (Note: Appearances in Copa Sudamericana)	0	—		6	0
Estudiantes	Total		10	0	3	0	2	0	1	0	15	0
Arsenal Sarandí (loan)	2019–20	AFA Liga Profesional de Fútbol	11	0	1	0	—		1 (Note: Appearance in Copa de la Superliga)	0	13	0
Patronato (loan)	2020	AFA Liga Profesional de Fútbol	—		—		—		7 (Note: Appearances in Copa de la Liga Profesional)	0	7	0
Belgrano (loan)	2021	Primera Nacional	0	0	—		—		—		0	0
Arsenal Sarandí (loan)	2021	AFA Liga Profesional de Fútbol	4	0	0	0	0	0	—		4	0
Palestino (loan)	2022	Liga de Primera	29	0	2	0	—		—		31	0
Deportes Iquique	2024	Liga de Primera	6	0	3	0	—		—		9	0
San Miguel	2025	Primera Nacional	33	0	—		—		1 (Note: Appearance in Torneo Reducido)	0	34	0
Spartak Kostroma	2025–26	Russian First League	10	0	—		—		—		10	0
Career total			103	0	9	0	2	0	9	0	123	0
