= Ramiro López =

Argentine footballer

Personal information
- Full name: Ramiro Andrés López
- Date of birth: 31 October 1984 (age 42)
- Place of birth: Wilde, Argentina
- Height: 1.77 m (5 ft 9 1/2 in)
- Position: Attacking midfielder

Team information
- Current team: San Telmo

Senior career*
Years	Team	Apps	(Gls)
2003–2004	El Porvenir	0	(0)
2005–2007	Almagro	27	(0)
2007–2008	Sportivo Italiano	42	(6)
2008–2009	Defensores de Belgrano	42	(7)
2009	Sportivo Italiano	14	(2)
2010	Deportivo Morón	15	(5)
2010–2012	Deportivo Merlo	69	(13)
2012–2013	Patronato	29	(0)
2013–2014	Sarmiento	38	(7)
2014–2015	San Martín	21	(3)
2015–2016	Arsenal de Sarandí	12	(1)
2016–2017	Los Andes	26	(2)
2017–2018	Villa Dálmine	22	(2)
2018-2019	Arsenal de Sarandí	17	(2)
2019–2020	Barracas Central	19	(2)
2020–	San Telmo	51	(8)
- * Club domestic league appearances and goals as of 19:50, 31 July 2022 (UTC)

Ramiro Andrés López (born 31 October 1984) is an Argentine professional footballer who plays as an attacking midfielder for San Telmo.

== Career ==
El Porvenir were López's opening senior club, which preceded a move to Argentine Primera División side Almagro in 2005. He went on to make twenty-seven appearances for them, with the majority falling in the subsequent two years in Primera B Nacional. López had two spells with Sportivo Italiano in 2007 and 2009, either side of a stint in Primera B Metropolitana with Defensores de Belgrano. 2010 saw López join Deportivo Morón, with the midfielder scoring five goals in fifteen games before departing six months later to sign for Deportivo Merlo on 30 June. He scored fourteen times in two seasons with the team.

Patronato signed López in July 2012, before Sarmiento did the same the following year. On 30 June 2014, López joined Primera B Nacional's San Martín. They won promotion to the Primera División in his first season, with him scoring on his top-flight debut for the club against Godoy Cruz on 14 February 2015. Fellow Primera División outfit Arsenal de Sarandí completed the signing of López in July, with the player leaving twelve months later to Los Andes of Primera B Nacional. A move to Villa Dálmine followed, before López rejoined Arsenal de Sarandí on 30 June 2018. His bow came on 25 August versus Gimnasia y Esgrima.

On 7 June 2019, after achieving promotion as champions to the Primera División with Arsenal, López agreed to leave after joining newly promoted Primera B Nacional team Barracas Central.

== Career statistics ==
As of 13 June 2019.

Club statistics
Club	Season	League			Cup		League Cup		Continental		Other		Total	
Club	Season	Division	Apps	Goals	Apps	Goals	Apps	Goals	Apps	Goals	Apps	Goals	Apps	Goals
El Porvenir	2003–04	Primera B Nacional	0	0	0	0	—		—		0	0	0	0
Almagro	2004–05	Primera División	3	0	0	0	—		—		0	0	3	0
Sportivo Italiano	2007–08	Primera B Metropolitana	42	6	0	0	—		—		0	0	42	6
Defensores de Belgrano	2008–09	Primera B Metropolitana	42	7	0	0	—		—		0	0	42	7
Sportivo Italiano	2009–10	Primera B Nacional	14	2	0	0	—		—		0	0	14	2
Deportivo Morón	2009–10	Primera B Metropolitana	15	5	0	0	—		—		0	0	15	5
Deportivo Merlo	2010–11	Primera B Nacional	35	6	0	0	—		—		0	0	35	6
Deportivo Merlo	2011–12	Primera B Nacional	34	7	4	1	—		—		0	0	38	8
Deportivo Merlo	Total		69	13	4	1	—		—		0	0	73	14
Patronato	2012–13	Primera B Nacional	29	0	2	1	—		—		0	0	31	1
Sarmiento	2013–14	Primera B Nacional	38	7	0	0	—		—		0	0	38	7
San Martín	2014	Primera B Nacional	15	2	0	0	—		—		0	0	15	2
San Martín	2015	Primera División	6	1	0	0	—		—		0	0	6	1
San Martín	Total		21	3	0	0	—		—		0	0	21	3
Arsenal de Sarandí	2015	Primera División	10	1	0	0	—		2 (Note: Appearance(s) in the Copa Sudamericana)	0	0	0	12	1
Arsenal de Sarandí	2016	Primera División	2	0	1	0	—		—		0	0	3	0
Arsenal de Sarandí	Total		12	1	1	0	—		0	0	0	0	13	1
Los Andes	2016–17	Primera B Nacional	26	2	2	0	—		—		0	0	28	2
Villa Dálmine	2017–18	Primera B Nacional	22	2	0	0	—		—		1 (Note: Appearance(s) in the Primera B Nacional play-offs)	1	23	3
Arsenal de Sarandí	2018–19	Primera B Nacional	17	2	1	0	—		—		1	0	19	2
Career total			150	50	10	2	—		2	0	2	1	364	53

== Honours ==
Arsenal de Sarandí

- Primera B Nacional: 2018–19
