= Gonzalo Gómez =

Argentine footballer

Personal information
- Full name: Gonzalo Ariel Gómez
- Date of birth: 23 February 1998 (age 28)
- Place of birth: Rosario, Argentina
- Position: Forward

Team information
- Current team: Arsenal de Sarandí

Senior career*
Years	Team	Apps	(Gls)
2018–	Arsenal de Sarandí	5	(0)
- * Club domestic league appearances and goals as of 13:05, 22 November 2018 (UTC)

Gonzalo Ariel Gómez (born 23 February 1998) is an Argentine professional footballer who plays as a forward for Arsenal de Sarandí.

== Career ==
Gómez's senior career began with Arsenal de Sarandí. He was an unused substitute during the 2017–18 Argentine Primera División season for games with Vélez Sarsfield and Chacarita Juniors, prior to making his professional debut during a 1–1 draw with Patronato on 9 April 2018. Three further appearances followed as Arsenal were relegated to Primera B Nacional.

== Career statistics ==
As of 22 November 2018.

Club statistics
Club	Season	League			Cup (Note: Includes the Copa Argentina)		League Cup		Continental		Other		Total	
Club	Season	Division	Apps	Goals	Apps	Goals	Apps	Goals	Apps	Goals	Apps	Goals	Apps	Goals
Arsenal de Sarandí	2017–18	Primera División	4	0	0	0	—		—		0	0	4	0
Arsenal de Sarandí	2018–19	Primera B Nacional	1	0	0	0	—		—		0	0	1	0
Career total			5	0	0	0	—		—		0	0	5	0
