= Emiliano Méndez =

Argentine footballer

Personal information
- Full name: Emiliano Jorge Rubén Méndez
- Date of birth: 15 February 1989 (age 37)
- Place of birth: La Plata, Argentina
- Height: 1.86 m (6 ft 1 in)
- Position: Midfielder

Team information
- Current team: Nueva Chicago
- Number: 5

Youth career
- Alumni de Los Hornos
- Gimnasia y Esgrima

Senior career*
Years	Team	Apps	(Gls)
2010–2013	Gimnasia y Esgrima	14	(0)
2013	Villa San Carlos	12	(0)
2014–2016	Estudiantes	69	(3)
2016–2017	Atlético Huila	28	(0)
2017–2018	Deportivo Morón	16	(0)
2018–2021	Arsenal de Sarandí	65	(3)
2022–2023	Sarmiento	60	(0)
2023–2024	Racing Montevideo	11	(0)
2024–2025	Sarmiento	18	(1)
2025–	Nueva Chicago	20	(4)
- * Club domestic league appearances and goals as of 17:11, 13 April 2026 (UTC)

Emiliano Jorge Rubén Méndez (born 15 February 1989) is an Argentine professional footballer who plays as a midfielder for Nueva Chicago.

== Career ==
Méndez started his career with Alumni de Los Hornos, before joining Gimnasia y Esgrima. He was selected for his professional debut on 15 May 2010 versus Atlético Tucumán, featuring for the last twenty-three minutes of a 3–3 draw. Fifteen appearances followed across the following three seasons. Primera B Nacional team Villa San Carlos completed the signing of Méndez on 7 July 2013. Twelve appearances followed. In January 2014, Méndez agreed to join Estudiantes of Torneo Argentino A. He scored his first senior goal on 9 May against Defensores de Belgrano. The midfielder departed after four goals in seventy-four games.

On 24 June 2016, Méndez joined Categoría Primera A side Atlético Huila. His first appearance arrived on 24 July during a victory over Deportivo Cali, with his final match being a 2–3 defeat to Cortuluá on 20 May 2017; a match in which he was sent off in after sixty-five minutes. Méndez returned to Argentina in the following July, signing for Primera B Nacional's Deportivo Morón. Having participated in eighteen fixtures during 2017–18, Méndez switched Deportivo Morón for Arsenal de Sarandí ahead of 2018–19.

== Career statistics ==
As of 21 November 2018.

Club statistics
Club	Season	League			Cup (Note: Includes the Copa Argentina)		League Cup		Continental		Other		Total	
Club	Season	Division	Apps	Goals	Apps	Goals	Apps	Goals	Apps	Goals	Apps	Goals	Apps	Goals
Gimnasia y Esgrima	2009–10	Primera División	1	0	0	0	—		—		0	0	1	0
Gimnasia y Esgrima	2010–11	Primera División	4	0	0	0	—		—		1 (Note: One appearance in the 2010–11 Primera División play-offs)	0	5	0
Gimnasia y Esgrima	2011–12	Primera B Nacional	9	0	1	0	—		—		0	0	10	0
Gimnasia y Esgrima	2012–13	Primera B Nacional	0	0	0	0	—		—		0	0	0	0
Gimnasia y Esgrima	Total		14	0	1	0	—		—		1	0	16	0
Villa San Carlos	2013–14	Primera B Nacional	12	0	0	0	—		—		0	0	12	0
Estudiantes	2013–14	Torneo Argentino A	12	0	0	0	—		—		3 (Note: Three appearances in the 2013–14 Torneo Argentino A play-offs)	1 (Note: One goal in the 2013–14 Torneo Argentino A play-offs)	15	1
Estudiantes	2014	Torneo Federal A	13	1	1	0	—		—		0	0	14	1
Estudiantes	2015	Primera B Nacional	29	1	0	0	—		—		0	0	29	1
Estudiantes	2016	Primera B Nacional	15	1	1	0	—		—		0	0	16	1
Estudiantes	Total		69	3	2	0	—		—		3	1	74	4
Atlético Huila	2016	Categoría Primera A	16	0	0	0	—		—		0	0	16	0
Atlético Huila	2017	Categoría Primera A	12	0	3	0	—		—		0	0	15	0
Atlético Huila	Total		28	0	3	0	—		—		0	0	31	0
Deportivo Morón	2017–18	Primera B Nacional	16	0	2	0	—		—		0	0	18	0
Arsenal de Sarandí	2018–19	Primera B Nacional	7	0	0	0	—		—		0	0	7	0
Career total			146	3	8	0	—		—		4	1	158	4
