= Facundo Quintana =

Argentine footballer

Personal information
- Full name: Facundo Quintana
- Date of birth: 28 January 1996 (age 30)
- Place of birth: Buenos Aires, Argentina
- Height: 1.71 m (5 ft 7 1/2 in)
- Position: Striker

Team information
- Current team: Flandria

Youth career
- 2006–2012: River Plate
- 2013–2014: Universidad de Chile
- 2015–2016: Estudiantes

Senior career*
Years	Team	Apps	(Gls)
2016–2018	Estudiantes	6	(3)
2018–2019	Arsenal de Sarandí	9	(0)
2019	LDU Portoviejo	?	(2)
2020	Salamanca UDS	0	(0)
2020–2021	Los Andes	39	(6)
2022–	Flandria	9	(0)
- * Club domestic league appearances and goals as of 20:36, 18 July 2022 (UTC)

Facundo Quintana (born 28 January 1996) is an Argentine footballer who plays as a striker for Flandria.

== Club career ==
Quintana is a youth exponent from Estudiantes. At 18 February 2016, he made his first team debut in a league game against Tigre in a 1–1 draw.

On 22 January 2019, Quintana signed with LDU Portoviejo in Ecuador. One year later, he moved to Spanish club Salamanca CF UDS. However, he wasn't presented before March 2020 due to the COVID-19 pandemic.

Quintana made no official appearances for Salamanca, before he returned to Argentine, where he signed with Los Andes on 8 October 2020.
