= Joel Soñora =

American soccer player (born 1996)

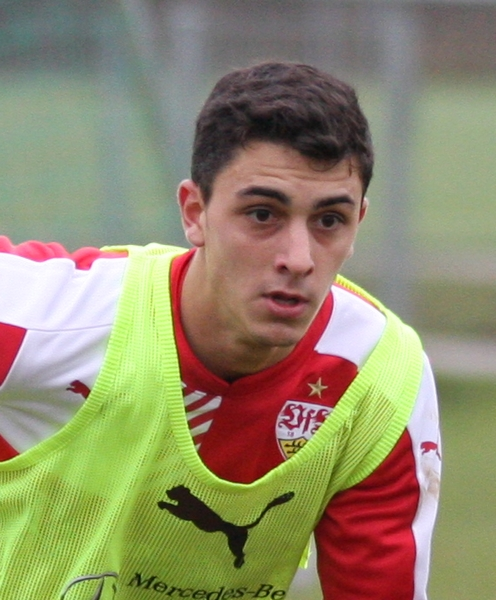
- Soñora training with VfB Stuttgart II

Personal information
- Full name: Joel Soñora
- Date of birth: September 15, 1996 (age 30)
- Place of birth: Dallas, Texas, United States
- Height: 5 ft 10 in (1.77 m)
- Position: Midfielder

Team information
- Current team: Miami FC
- Number: 9

Youth career
- Luján de Cuyo
- 2011–2015: Boca Juniors

Senior career*
Years	Team	Apps	(Gls)
2016–2018	VfB Stuttgart II	56	(9)
2018	→ Talleres (loan)	9	(1)
2019–2021	Talleres	28	(2)
2019–2020	→ Arsenal Sarandí (loan)	17	(4)
2021–2022	Banfield	17	(1)
2022	→ Vélez Sarsfield (loan)	20	(0)
2022	Marítimo	4	(0)
2023	Juárez	5	(0)
2023–2024	Huracán	2	(0)
2024	Independiente Rivadavia	6	(0)
2024–2025	Colón	19	(1)
2026–	Miami FC	22	(0)

International career
2012–2013	United States U17	6	(1)
2014–2015	United States U20	12	(1)
- * Club domestic league appearances and goals as of November 7, 2026

Joel Soñora (born September 15, 1996) is an American professional soccer player who plays as a midfielder for Miami FC in the USL Championship.

== Early life ==
He is the son of the Argentine player Diego Soñora and brother of Alan Soñora. He was born in Dallas while his father was playing for the Dallas Burn but then returned to Argentina with his family in 2001 when his father's career ended.

== Career ==
Soñora joined VfB Stuttgart II on January 22, 2016. On January 30, 2016, he made his debut for VfB Stuttgart II in the 3. Liga against FC Erzgebirge Aue.

On January 14, 2018, Soñora was loaned out to Talleres de Córdoba until the end of the year.
