= Jesús Soraire =

Argentine footballer

Personal information
- Full name: Jesús Miguel Soraire
- Date of birth: 3 December 1988 (age 37)
- Place of birth: San Isidro de Lules, Argentina
- Height: 1.75 m (5 ft 9 in)
- Position: Midfielder

Team information
- Current team: San Martín Tucumán
- Number: 8

Senior career*
Years	Team	Apps	(Gls)
- Almirante Brown
2012–2013	Villa Cubas	16	(2)
2013–2014	San Jorge	22	(0)
2014	Chaco For Ever	5	(0)
2015	San Martín	17	(1)
2016	Almirante Brown	4	(0)
2016–2018	San Jorge	38	(2)
2018–2021	Arsenal de Sarandí	65	(1)
2021–2024	Central Córdoba SdE	73	(4)
2023–2024	→ Banfield (loan)	37	(3)
2025–	San Martín	16	(1)
- * Club domestic league appearances and goals as of 18:29, 16 August 2025 (UTC)

Jesús Miguel Soraire (born 3 December 1988) is an Argentine professional footballer who plays as a midfielder for San Martín Tucumán.

== Career ==
Soraire began his career with Almirante Brown, prior to featuring for Villa Cubas in Torneo Argentino B during the 2012–13 campaign. He departed at the conclusion of that season, subsequently being signed by Torneo Argentino A's San Jorge. He made his debut on 17 August against Central Norte, which was one of twenty-three appearances in 2013–14. After joining Chaco For Ever for the 2014 Torneo Federal A campaign, Soraire agreed to join fellow third tier team San Martín in January 2015. His first goal arrived on 5 July during a draw with Juventud Antoniana. Soraire had a six-month stint back with Almirante Brown in 2016.

Six months later in 2016, San Jorge resigned Soraire. Forty-two games and two goals followed. On 19 July 2018, Soraire joined Primera B Nacional side Arsenal de Sarandí. He made his professional football bow versus Gimnasia y Esgrima on 25 August.

== Career statistics ==
As of 21 November 2018.

Club statistics
Club	Season	League			Cup (Note: Includes the Copa Argentina)		League Cup		Continental		Other		Total	
Club	Season	Division	Apps	Goals	Apps	Goals	Apps	Goals	Apps	Goals	Apps	Goals	Apps	Goals
Villa Cubas	2012–13	Torneo Argentino B	16	2	0	0	—		—		0	0	16	2
San Jorge	2013–14	Torneo Argentino A	22	0	1	0	—		—		0	0	23	0
Chaco For Ever	2014	Torneo Federal A	5	0	2	0	—		—		0	0	7	0
San Martín	2015	Torneo Federal A	17	1	0	0	—		—		3 (Note: Three appearances in the 2015 Torneo Federal A play-offs)	0	20	1
Almirante Brown	2016	Torneo Federal B	4	0	0	0	—		—		0	0	4	0
San Jorge	2016–17	Torneo Federal A	18	1	2	0	—		—		0	0	20	1
San Jorge	2017–18	Torneo Federal A	20	1	0	0	—		—		2 (Note: Two appearances in the 2017–18 Torneo Federal A play-offs)	0	22	1
San Jorge	Total		38	2	2	0	—		—		2	0	42	2
Arsenal de Sarandí	2018–19	Primera B Nacional	10	1	0	0	—		—		0	0	10	1
Career total			112	6	5	0	—		—		5	0	122	6
