= Facundo Pons =

Argentine footballer

Personal information
- Date of birth: 22 November 1995 (age 30)
- Place of birth: Venado Tuerto, Argentina
- Height: 1.86 m (6 ft 1 in)
- Position: Forward

Team information
- Current team: Coquimbo Unido

Youth career
- Centenario
- 2018: Arsenal de Sarandí

Senior career*
Years	Team	Apps	(Gls)
2012–2014	Centenario	–	(–)
2014–2015	Atlético Elortondo	–	(–)
2016–2017	Juventud Pueyrredón	15	(4)
2018–2023	Arsenal de Sarandí	54	(10)
2020	→ Deportivo Riestra (loan)	3	(0)
2021	→ Quilmes (loan)	27	(8)
2022	→ Alvarado (loan)	24	(3)
2024	Macará	13	(6)
2024	Estudiantes RC	9	(0)
2025	Defensores de Belgrano	14	(7)
2025	Deportes Limache	9	(6)
2026	San Martín Tucumán	14	(1)
2026–	Coquimbo Unido	0	(0)
- * Club domestic league appearances and goals as of 27 June 2026

Facundo Pons (born 22 November 1995) is an Argentine professional footballer who plays as a forward for Chilean Primera División club Coquimbo Unido.

== Career ==
Pons made his senior debut in regional football with Centenario at the age of 16, before signing for fellow Liga Venadense team Atlético Elortondo two years later. In 2016, Pons signed for Juventud Pueyrredon. The club featured in Torneo Federal B in 2017, with Pons netting four goals in fifteen appearances. In 2018, Pons joined Primera B Nacional side Arsenal de Sarandí. He scored his first professional goal on his first start for Arsenal, scoring in a 3–0 win over Mitre on 13 October; which he followed up with further goals against Independiente Rivadavia and Quilmes (2) over the next month.

In September 2025, Pons moved to Chile and joined Deportes Limache in the Primera División until the end of the season.

Back to Argentina with San Martín de Tucumán for the 2026 season, he returned to Chile with Coquimbo Unido on 26 June 2026.

== Career statistics ==
As of 3 June 2019.

Club statistics
Club	Season	League			Cup		League Cup		Continental		Other		Total	
Club	Season	Division	Apps	Goals	Apps	Goals	Apps	Goals	Apps	Goals	Apps	Goals	Apps	Goals
Juventud Pueyrredon	2017	Torneo Federal B	15	4	0	0	—		—		0	0	15	4
Arsenal de Sarandí	2018–19	Primera B Nacional	19	7	1	0	—		—		1 (Note: Appearance(s) in the Primera B Nacional play-offs)	0	20	7
Career total			34	11	1	0	—		—		1	0	36	11

== Honours ==
Coquimbo Unido

- Copa de La Liga: 2026
