= Alejo Antilef =

Argentine professional footballer

Personal information
- Full name: Alejo Antilef
- Date of birth: 20 July 1998 (age 28)
- Place of birth: Puerto Pirámides, Argentina
- Position: Midfielder

Team information
- Current team: Anzoátegui
- Number: 14

Youth career
- J.J. Moreno
- 2013–2018: Arsenal de Sarandí

Senior career*
Years	Team	Apps	(Gls)
2018–2022	Arsenal de Sarandí	96	(6)
2023	Unión La Calera	0	(0)
2023	→ San Luis (loan)	28	(1)
2024	All Boys	8	(0)
2024	Mitre SdE	13	(0)
2025–	Anzoátegui	23	(1)
- * Club domestic league appearances and goals as of 2 August 2025

Alejo Antilef (born 20 July 1998) is an Argentine professional footballer who plays as a midfielder for Venezuelan club Anzoátegui.

== Career ==
Antilef began his career in J. J. Moreno's ranks, before joining Arsenal de Sarandí in 2013 following a trial. Sergio Rondina promoted Antilef into his first-team squad in January 2018, selecting him for his professional debut on 27 January against Newell's Old Boys; a game in which Antilef also scored his first senior goal during a 2–1 defeat at the Estadio Marcelo Bielsa. One goal, against Rosario Central in May, in twelve appearances followed in 2017–18 as Arsenal were relegated.

In 2023, Antilef moved to Chile and joined Unión La Calera in the Chilean top division, but he was loaned to San Luis de Quillota in the Primera B.

In January 2025, Antilef moved to Venezuela and joined Anzoátegui in the top level.

== Personal life ==
He is of Chilean descent.

== Career statistics ==
As of 21 November 2018.

Club statistics
Club	Season	League			Cup (Note: Includes the Copa Argentina)		League Cup		Continental		Other		Total	
Club	Season	Division	Apps	Goals	Apps	Goals	Apps	Goals	Apps	Goals	Apps	Goals	Apps	Goals
Arsenal de Sarandí	2017–18	Primera División	13	2	1	0	—		—		0	0	14	2
Arsenal de Sarandí	2018–19	Primera B Nacional	8	2	0	0	—		—		0	0	8	2
Career total			21	4	1	0	—		—		0	0	22	4
