= Fernando Torrent =

Argentine footballer

Personal information
- Full name: Fernando Torrent Guidi
- Date of birth: 2 October 1991 (age 35)
- Place of birth: Arrecifes, Argentina
- Height: 1.73 m (5 ft 8 in)
- Position: Right-back

Team information
- Current team: Ferro Carril Oeste

Youth career
- 1997–2004: San Martin de Pérez Millán
- 2004–2011: Defensores de Belgrano

Senior career*
Years	Team	Apps	(Gls)
2011–2018	Defensores de Belgrano	107	(6)
2015	→ Brown (loan)	22	(2)
2018–2024	Arsenal de Sarandí	45	(2)
2020–2023	→ Rosario Central (loan)	27	(0)
2023	→ Huracán (loan)	14	(0)
2024–2025	Central Córdoba SdE	10	(0)
2025–2026	Quilmes	15	(1)
2026–	Ferro Carril Oeste	0	(0)
- * Club domestic league appearances and goals as of 17:34, 26 May 2025 (UTC)

Fernando Torrent Guidi (born 2 October 1991) is an Argentine professional footballer who plays as a right-back for Ferro Carril Oeste.

== Career ==
Torrent started his career with San Martin de Pérez Millán in 1997, before joining Defensores de Belgrano's youth in 2004. In 2011, Torrent scored his first senior goal during a play-off second leg against Torneo Argentino A's Estudiantes, which secured promotion to the third tier. His league debut arrived in November 2012 versus Guillermo Brown, which was the first of forty-four appearances in his first three seasons; whilst also scoring four more goals. January 2015 saw Torrent depart the club on loan, signing for Primera B Metropolitana side Brown. He scored two goals as Brown won the 2015 title and promotion.

He returned to his parent club for the 2016 Torneo Federal A, remaining the 2016, 2016–17 and 2017–18 seasons. On 30 June 2018, Torrent completed a move to Arsenal de Sarandí of Primera B Nacional.

After two years at Arsenal, Torrent moved to Rosario Central in September 2020 on a loan deal until the end of 2021 with a purchase option. The loan was later extended until the end of 2022. On 30 December 2022, Torrent joined Huracán on a one-year loan.

== Career statistics ==
As of 22 November 2018.

Club statistics
Club	Season	League			Cup (Note: Includes the Copa Argentina)		League Cup		Continental		Other		Total	
Club	Season	Division	Apps	Goals	Apps	Goals	Apps	Goals	Apps	Goals	Apps	Goals	Apps	Goals
Defensores de Belgrano	2010–11	Torneo Argentino B	0	0	0	0	—		—		1 (Note: One appearance in the 2010–11 Torneo Argentino B play-offs)	1	1	1
Defensores de Belgrano	2011–12	Torneo Argentino A	0	0	0	0	—		—		0	0	0	0
Defensores de Belgrano	2012–13	Torneo Argentino A	1	0	0	0	—		—		0	0	1	0
Defensores de Belgrano	2013–14	Torneo Argentino A	26	1	0	0	—		—		2 (Note: Two appearances in the 2013–14 Torneo Argentino A play-offs)	1 (Note: One goal in the 2013–14 Torneo Argentino A play-offs)	28	2
Defensores de Belgrano	2014	Torneo Federal A	13	0	2	2	—		—		0	0	15	2
Defensores de Belgrano	2015	Torneo Federal A	0	0	0	0	—		—		0	0	0	0
Defensores de Belgrano	2016	Torneo Federal A	5	0	2	0	—		—		3 (Note: Three appearances in the 2016 Torneo Federal A play-offs)	0	10	0
Defensores de Belgrano	2016–17	Torneo Federal A	16	0	3	2	—		—		8 (Note: Eight appearances in the 2016–17 Torneo Federal A play-offs)	1 (Note: One goal in the 2016–17 Torneo Federal A play-offs)	27	3
Defensores de Belgrano	2017–18	Torneo Federal A	27	3	3	0	—		—		6 (Note: Six appearances in the 2017–18 Torneo Federal A play-offs)	0	36	3
Defensores de Belgrano	Total		88	4	10	4	—		—		20	3	118	11
Brown	2015	Primera B Metropolitana	22	2	1	0	—		—		0	0	23	2
Arsenal de Sarandí	2018–19	Primera B Nacional	9	0	0	0	—		—		0	0	9	0
Career total			119	6	11	4	—		—		20	3	150	13

== Honours ==
Brown

- Primera B Metropolitana: 2015
