= Gastón Suárez (footballer) =

Argentine footballer (born 1993)

Personal information
- Full name: Gastón Maximiliano Álvarez Suárez
- Date of birth: 5 April 1993 (age 33)
- Place of birth: Córdoba, Argentina
- Height: 1.80 m (5 ft 11 in)
- Position: Midfielder

Team information
- Current team: Al Wahda
- Number: 66

Youth career
- –2011: Belgrano

Senior career*
Years	Team	Apps	(Gls)
2011–2018	Belgrano	21	(1)
2014	→ San Marcos de Arica (loan)	14	(1)
2014–2015	→ Sportivo Belgrano (loan)	57	(8)
2017–2018	→ Los Andes (loan)	22	(2)
2018–2020	Arsenal de Sarandí	30	(4)
2020–2024	Baniyas	96	(14)
2024–2026	Shabab Al Ahli	12	(0)
2026–	Al Wahda	0	(0)

International career^{‡}
2025–	United Arab Emirates	2	(1)
- * Club domestic league appearances and goals as of 17:52, 24 January 2022 (UTC) ‡ National team caps and goals as of 21:00, 4 September 2025 (UTC)

Gastón Maximiliano Álvarez Suárez (born 5 April 1993) is a professional footballer who plays as a midfielder for the UAE Pro League club Al Wahda. Born in Argentina, he represents the United Arab Emirates national team.

== Career ==
=== Club ===
Álvarez Suárez began his career with Argentine Primera División side Belgrano in 2011, making his debut on 26 September in the league against Estudiantes. Between 2014 and 2015, Álvarez Suárez was loaned out twice. Firstly to Primera B de Chile side San Marcos de Arica, before joining Primera B Nacional's Sportivo Belgrano.

== International career ==
List of international goals scored by Gastón Suárez
No.	Date	Venue	Opponent	Score	Result	Competition
1	4 September 2025	Zabeel Stadium, Dubai, United Arab Emirates	Syria	3–1	3–1	Friendly

== Personal life ==
He is the nephew of fellow footballer Matías Suárez and cousin of Federico Álvarez, another footballer.
