= Pablo Santillo =

Argentine footballer

Personal information
- Full name: Pablo Ariel Santillo
- Date of birth: 7 March 1980 (age 46)
- Place of birth: Buenos Aires, Argentina
- Height: 1.83 m (6 ft 0 in)
- Position: Goalkeeper

Team information
- Current team: Arsenal de Sarandí
- Number: 22

Youth career
- Chacarita Juniors

Senior career*
Years	Team	Apps	(Gls)
2001–2003	Chacarita Juniors		
2003–2005	Atlanta		
2005–2013	Banfield		
2008–2009	→ Barcelona (loan)		
2009–2010	→ Racing Club (loan)	2	(0)
2013–2014	Talleres	32	(0)
2014–2015	Atlanta	15	(0)
2015–2016	Defensa y Justicia	5	(0)
2016–	Arsenal de Sarandí	40	(0)
- * Club domestic league appearances and goals as of 23:41, 22 May 2018 (UTC)

Pablo Ariel Santillo (born 7 March 1980) is an Argentine professional footballer who plays as a goalkeeper for Argentine Primera División side Arsenal de Sarandí.

== Career ==
Santillo's career began in 2001 with Argentine Primera División team Chacarita Juniors, where he remained until 2003 when he joined lower-league Atlanta. Two years later, Santillo left to join Primera División club Banfield. He stayed with Banfield for eight years between 2005 and 2013, his spell there included two loan spells. His first loan was to Ecuadorian Serie A side Barcelona while his second was to top-flight Argentine team Racing Club, he made just two appearances for the latter before returning to Banfield. In 2013, after thirty-one appearances in Primera B Nacional, Santillo left to sign for fellow tier two club Talleres.

A secondary spell with Atlanta (in Primera B Metropolitana) before moves to Defensa y Justicia and Arsenal de Sarandí have since followed.

== Career statistics ==
As of 22 May 2018.

Club statistics
Club	Season	League			Cup (Note: Includes the Copa Argentina)		League Cup		Continental (Note: Includes the Copa Sudamericana)		Other		Total	
Club	Season	Division	Apps	Goals	Apps	Goals	Apps	Goals	Apps	Goals	Apps	Goals	Apps	Goals
Arsenal de Sarandí	2016–17	Primera División	18	0	0	0	—		0	0	0	0	18	0
Arsenal de Sarandí	2017–18	Primera División	22	0	0	0	—		2 (Note: Two appearances in 2017 Copa Sudamericana)	0	0	0	24	0
Career total			40	0	0	0	—		2	0	0	0	42	0

== Honours ==
Banfield

- Argentine Primera División: 2009–10 Apertura
