= Franco Sbuttoni =

Argentine footballer

Personal information
- Date of birth: 6 May 1989 (age 37)
- Place of birth: San Nicolás, Argentina
- Height: 1.90 m (6 ft 3 in)
- Position: Centre-back

Team information
- Current team: Gela

Youth career
- Tiro Federal

Senior career*
Years	Team	Apps	(Gls)
2009–2010	Tiro Federal	1	(0)
2010–2011	Central Córdoba	0	(0)
2011–2012	Sportivo Belgrano	0	(0)
2012–2013	Independiente Rivadavia	17	(3)
2013–2017	Atlético Tucumán	80	(2)
2017	Sagan Tosu	3	(0)
2017–2019	Atlético Tucumán	4	(1)
2019–2020	Arsenal Sarandí	21	(1)
2020–2022	Central Córdoba SdE	41	(0)
2023	Sarmiento	17	(0)
2024	Gimnasia y Esgrima de Mendoza	9	(0)
2024–2025	Puteolana	22	(1)
2025	Juventud Unida	13	(0)
2025–	Gela	17	(0)
- * Club domestic league appearances and goals as of 18 January 2026

Franco Sbuttoni (born 6 May 1989) is an Argentine professional footballer who plays as a centre-back for Italian Serie D club Gela.

== Biography ==
He debuted in 2009 playing for Tiro Federal, he had little involvement. He went on to Sportivo Belgrano, where it was continued although not scored a goal in each of the two games he played. He also played for Independiente Rivadavia de Mendoza where he scored three goals. Play for Atlético Tucumán.

== Club statistics ==
Updated to 31 May 2017.

Appearances and goals by club, season and competition
Club	Season	League			Cup		League Cup		Total	
Club	Season	Division	Apps	Goals	Apps	Goals	Apps	Goals	Apps	Goals
Sagan Tosu	2017	J1 League	3	0	0	0	5	0	8	0
Total			3	0	0	0	5	0	8	0
