= Maximiliano Gagliardo =

Argentine footballer (born 1983)

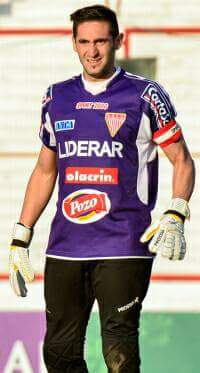
- 2017

Personal information
- Full name: Maximiliano José Gagliardo
- Date of birth: 21 April 1983 (age 43)
- Place of birth: Chivilcoy, Argentina
- Height: 1.78 m (5 ft 10 in)
- Position: Goalkeeper

Team information
- Current team: Flandria

Senior career*
Years	Team	Apps	(Gls)
2001–2002	Almte. Brown (ARF)	6	(0)
2002	El Porvenir	0	(0)
2003–2004	Flandria	114	(0)
2004–2005	Platense	21	(0)
2005–2007	Deportivo Morón	67	(0)
2008	Unión San Felipe	22	(0)
2008–2009	Tristán Suárez	38	(0)
2009–2010	Defensa y Justicia	10	(0)
2010–2013	Atlanta	41	(0)
2013–2018	Los Andes	184	(0)
2018–2021	Arsenal de Sarandí	46	(0)
2021–2022	Barracas Central	35	(0)
2023	Independiente Rivadavia	32	(0)
2024–2025	Quilmes	5	(0)
2025–	Flandria	0	(0)
- * Club domestic league appearances and goals as of 18:37, 20 March 2022 (UTC)

Maximiliano José Gagliardo (Italian: [ɡaʎˈʎardo]; born 21 April 1983) is an Argentine association football player, who plays as a goalkeeper for Flandria.

He played for Barracas Central of the Argentine Primera División.
