= Iván Delfino =

Argentine football manager

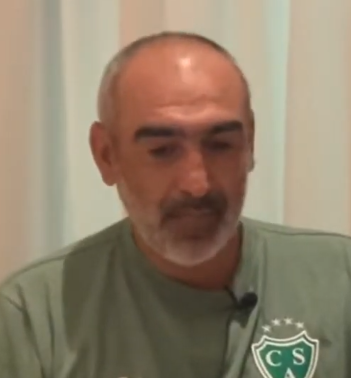
- Delfino in 2019

Personal information
- Full name: Iván Raúl Delfino
- Date of birth: 16 August 1971 (age 55)
- Place of birth: Sunchales, Argentina
- Height: 1.91 m (6 ft 3 in)
- Position: Defender

Senior career*
Years	Team	Apps	(Gls)
1992	9 de Julio de Rafaela	1	(0)
1992–1996	Banfield		
1996–2002	El Porvenir	189	(19)
2002–2003	Gimnasia Jujuy	33	(0)
2003–2004	San Martín Mendoza	44	(1)
2005–2006	Juventud Antoniana	49	(3)
2006–2007	Libertad Sunchales	17	(1)

Managerial career
- 2007–2008: Libertad Sunchales (assistant)
- 2008–2011: Libertad Sunchales
- 2012–2013: Juventud Antoniana
- 2013–2014: Crucero del Norte
- 2015: Patronato
- 2016: Temperley
- 2016–2017: Instituto
- 2017–2020: Sarmiento
- 2021–2022: Patronato
- 2023: San Martín de Tucumán
- 2023: Estudiantes de Río Cuarto
- 2024: Colón
- 2025–2026: Estudiantes de Río Cuarto
- * Club domestic league appearances and goals

Iván Raúl Delfino (born 16 August 1971) is an Argentine football manager and former player who played as a defender.

== Playing career ==
Delfino was born in Sunchales, Santa Fe, and made his senior debut with 9 de Julio de Rafaela in 1992. He moved to Banfield during the year, and spent four seasons at the club before signing for El Porvenir.

Delfino helped El Porvenir in their promotion to the Primera B Nacional in 1998, being a regular starter. He left the club in 2002, and subsequently represented second division sides Gimnasia y Esgrima de Jujuy, San Martín de Mendoza and Juventud Antoniana.

In 2006, Delfino joined Libertad Sunchales in the Torneo Argentino B. He retired with the club in the end of the season, aged 35.

== Managerial career ==
Immediately after retiring, Delfino became an assistant manager at his last club Libertad. On 8 January 2008, he was named first team manager in the place of departed Frank Darío Kudelka.

Delfino resigned on 13 December 2011, after eight winless matches. The following 22 February, he took over a club he already represented as a player, Juventud Unida.

On 26 February 2013, Delfino was appointed manager of Crucero del Norte in the second level. He presented his resignation roughly one year later, and was named in charge of Patronato on 18 December 2014.

On 16 December 2015, after achieving promotion to the Primera División with Patronato, Delfino was named at the helm of Temperley also in the top tier. He was sacked by the club the following 3 May, and took over Instituto on 16 June.

Delfino left Instituto on a mutual agreement on 20 April 2017, and was appointed manager of Sarmiento on 7 October. He led the side to the leadership of the 2020 Primera Nacional, but left on 24 December of that year to return to Patronato.
