= 2014 Primera B Metropolitana =

Primera B Metropolitana
- Season: 2014
- Champions: (none)
- Promoted: Chacarita Juniors; Los Andes; Villa Dálmine
- Relegated: No relegation this season
- Matches: 224
- Goals: 464 (2.07 per match)
- Biggest home win: Los Andes 4-0 Deportivo Armenio (August 22); Colegiales 5-1 Fénix (October 4); Platense 4-0 Sportivo Italiano (October 11)
- Biggest away win: Deportivo Merlo 0-4 Estudiantes (BA) (September 28); Deportivo Merlo 0-4 Chacarita Juniors (October 4); Sportivo Italiano 0-4 Comunicaciones (October 6)
- Highest scoring: Almirante Brown 5-5 Estudiantes (BA) (November 15)

The 2013–14 season, is the 29º Primera B Metropolitana season since it became part of the third tier of the Argentine football league system. The tournament is reserved for teams directly affiliated to the Asociación del Fútbol Argentino (AFA), while teams affiliated to AFA through local leagues (known as "indirectly affiliated to AFA") have to play the Torneo Federal A, which is the other third-tier competition. For this season, AFA decided to change the structure in the Argentine football league system, and exceptionally 3 teams will be promoted to the next season of Primera B Nacional and there will be no relegations for this season. A total of 22 teams competed.

No champion was crowned this season, with the teams placed first of each zone (Chacarita Juniors and Los Andes respectively) promoting to Primera Nacional. The third club to promote was Villa Dálmine via "torneo reducido".

== Competition format ==
The tournament is composed of 22 teams playing in two zones on a double round-robin format, each team then playing a total of 20 matches. Three points are awarded for a win, one for a draw and none for a loss. The team of each zone with more points is automatically promoted to the Primera B Nacional. Teams positioned 2nd to 4th qualify for the Torneo Reducido, which will be played on a, home and away, knock-out system, the winner of the final is then promoted to the Primera B Nacional. If the playoff ends in a draw, there is a penalty shoot-out to determine a winner. For this season exceptionally there will be no relegation.

== Clubs ==
Club	City	Province	Stadium
Acassuso	Boulogne	Buenos Aires	La Quema
Almagro	José Ingenieros	Buenos Aires	Tres de Febrero
Almirante Brown	Isidro Casanova	Buenos Aires	Fragata Sarmiento
Atlanta	Buenos Aires	autonomous city	León Kolbovski
Barracas Central	Buenos Aires	autonomous city	Barracas Central
Brown	Adrogué	Buenos Aires	Lorenzo Arandilla
Chacarita Juniors	Villa Maipú	Buenos Aires	Chacarita Juniors
Colegiales	Florida Oeste	Buenos Aires	Libertarios Unidos
Comunicaciones	Buenos Aires	autonomous city	Alfredo Ramos
Deportivo Armenio	Ingeniero Maschwitz	Buenos Aires	República de Armenia
Deportivo Español	Buenos Aires	autonomous city	Nueva España
Deportivo Merlo	Merlo	Buenos Aires	José Manuel Moreno
Deportivo Morón	Morón	Buenos Aires	Nuevo Francisco Urbano
Estudiantes (BA)	Caseros	Buenos Aires	Ciudad de Caseros
Fénix	Pilar	Buenos Aires	Carlos Barraza
Los Andes	Lomas de Zamora	Buenos Aires	Eduardo Gallardón
Platense	Florida	Buenos Aires	Ciudad de Vicente López
Sportivo Italiano	Ciudad Evita	Buenos Aires	República de Italia
Tristán Suárez	Tristán Suárez	Buenos Aires	20 de Octubre
UAI Urquiza	Villa Lynch	Buenos Aires	Monumental de Villa Lynch
Villa Dálmine	Campana	Buenos Aires	El Coliseo
Villa San Carlos	Berisso	Buenos Aires	Gennasio Salice

== Standings ==
=== Zone 1 ===
Pos	Team	Pld	W	D	L	GF	GA	GD	Pts	Promotion or qualification
1	Chacarita Juniors	20	12	6	2	36	13	+23	42	Primera B Nacional
2	Estudiantes (BA)	20	12	5	3	36	20	+16	41	Torneo Reducido
3	Tristán Suárez	20	11	6	3	24	14	+10	39	Torneo Reducido
4	Villa Dálmine	20	11	4	5	26	15	+11	37	Torneo Reducido
5	Almirante Brown	20	8	8	4	26	19	+7	32	
6	Deportivo Español	20	7	5	8	20	25	−5	26	
7	Brown	20	4	7	9	15	22	−7	19	
8	Colegiales	20	4	6	10	23	23	0	18	
9	Atlanta	20	4	4	12	17	27	−10	16	
10	Deportivo Merlo	20	4	4	12	16	40	−24	16	
11	Fénix	20	4	3	13	12	33	−21	15	

==== Results ====
Home \ Away	ALB	ATL	BRO	CHA	COL	DEE	DEM	EST	FEN	TRI	VDA
Almirante Brown		3–1	1–1	0–0	1–0	3–0	2–0	5–5	0–0	0–1	1–2
Atlanta	2–1		1–1	1–2	1–1	0–3	5–3	0–1	1–0	0–1	4–1
Brown	1–2	2–0		0–0	0–2	2–1	3–1	2–0	0–0	0–0	1–2
Chacarita Juniors	2–2	1–0	4–1		2–1	3–1	3–0	1–2	0–1	1–1	1–0
Colegiales	0–1	1–1	2–0	0–1		1–2	0–1	0–0	5–1	1–2	1–1
Deportivo Español	0–0	2–0	0–0	0–3	2–1		2–0	0–2	1–0	2–2	0–3
Deportivo Merlo	0–0	1–0	0–0	0–4	3–3	0–0		0–4	3–2	0–2	0–3
Estudiantes (BA)	3–1	0–0	1–0	1–4	1–1	2–1	1–0		4–2	0–0	1–2
Fénix	0–1	1–0	2–1	1–1	2–0	0–3	0–2	0–3		0–3	0–2
Tristán Suárez	1–1	1–0	1–0	0–2	1–0	3–0	3–2	1–4	1–0		0–0
Villa Dálmine	0–1	1–0	2–0	1–1	0–3	0–0	3–0	0–1	2–0	1–0	

Updated to match(es) played on November 18, 2014. Source: AFA
Legend: Blue = home team win; Yellow = draw; Red = away team win.

=== Zone 2 ===
Pos	Team	Pld	W	D	L	GF	GA	GD	Pts	Promotion or qualification
1	Los Andes	20	11	8	1	29	12	+17	41	Primera B Nacional
2	Acassuso	20	10	7	3	26	13	+13	37	Torneo Reducido
3	Barracas Central	20	9	6	5	23	18	+5	33	Torneo Reducido
4	Deportivo Morón	20	8	7	5	19	11	+8	31	Torneo Reducido
5	Villa San Carlos	20	9	4	7	21	14	+7	31	
6	UAI Urquiza	20	6	8	6	17	20	−3	26	
7	Platense	20	6	5	9	18	21	−3	23	
8	Deportivo Armenio	20	5	7	8	14	26	−12	22	
9	Comunicaciones	20	3	10	7	17	18	−1	19	
10	Sportivo Italiano	20	3	6	11	10	31	−21	15	
11	Almagro	20	2	8	10	13	23	−10	14	

==== Results ====
Home \ Away	ACA	ALM	BAR	COM	DEA	DMO	LAN	PLA	SPO	UAI	VSC
Acassuso		2–0	3–1	2–0	0–0	1–0	2–2	0–0	3–0	2–2	2–1
Almagro	0–2		1–2	1–0	1–1	0–0	0–1	1–2	1–1	2–2	0–0
Barracas Central	1–0	1–0		0–0	0–1	2–0	1–1	1–0	3–1	1–1	1–0
Comunicaciones	0–0	1–1	2–1		1–1	1–2	1–1	0–1	2–0	1–1	0–0
Deportivo Armenio	1–2	0–0	0–2	3–2		1–1	0–2	0–1	1–0	1–0	0–2
Deportivo Morón	0–1	2–0	1–1	0–0	3–0		0–1	0–1	0–0	2–0	2–0
Los Andes	2–1	3–1	1–1	1–1	4–0	0–0		1–0	0–0	1–2	1–0
Platense	1–1	0–3	1–2	1–1	1–1	1–2	0–2		4–0	2–0	0–1
Sportivo Italiano	2–1	1–1	3–1	0–4	0–2	0–2	1–1	0–0		0–1	0–3
UAI Urquiza	0–0	1–0	1–1	1–0	1–1	0–1	0–2	2–0	1–0		1–1
Villa San Carlos	0–1	1–0	1–0	1–0	3–0	1–1	1–2	3–2	0–1	2–0	

Updated to match(es) played on November 19, 2014. Source: AFA
Legend: Blue = home team win; Yellow = draw; Red = away team win.

== Relegation ==
This season there will be no relegations. The points obtained will be added for the next season.

== Torneo Reducido ==
Teams placed from 2nd. to 4th. of each zone qualified to "torneo reducido", a single-elimination tournament. The final was the only stage to be played under a two-legged tie format.

Villa Dálmine won the tournament, earning promotion to Primera Nacional.

Quarterfinals
B2	Acassuso
A3	Tristán Suárez	0	0 (3)
B4	Deportivo Morón	0	0 (0)
A2	Estudiantes (BA)
B3	Barracas Central	1	1 (2)
A4	Villa Dálmine	1	1 (4)

Semifinals
B2	Acassuso	1	1
A3	Tristán Suárez	3	3
A2	Estudiantes (BA)	0 (5)	0 (5)
A4	Villa Dálmine	0 (6)	0 (6)

Final
A3	Tristán Suárez	1	0	1
A4	Villa Dálmine	0	2	2

=== Quarterfinals ===
Team 1	Score	Team 2
Tristán Suárez	0-0 (3-0)p	Deportivo Morón

Team 1	Score	Team 2
Barracas Central	1-1 (2-4)p	Villa Dálmine

=== Semifinals ===
Team 1	Score	Team 2
Estudiantes (BA)	0-0 (5-6)p	Villa Dálmine

Team 1	Score	Team 2
Acassuso	1-3	Tristán Suárez

=== Finals ===
Torneo Reducido Finals
(3rd. promotion playoff)
3 Dec 2014
First leg

Villa Dálmine	0–1	Tristán Suárez

El Coliseo de Mitre y Puccini, Campana

8 Dec 2014
Second leg

Tristán Suárez	0–2	Villa Dálmine
	Report	Rossi 28'; Cérica 54'

Estadio 20 de Octubre, Tristán Suárez
Referee: Carlos Stoklas

Team details

Tristán Suárez
Villa Dálmine

GK	(Argentina) Darío Capogrosso
DF	(Argentina) Pablo Molina
DF	(Argentina) Ezequiel Vicente
DF	(Argentina) Darío Cajaravilla
DF	(Argentina) Facundo Talín
MF	(Argentina) Gastón Bottino
MF	(Argentina) Daniel Imperiale
MF	(Argentina) Marcos Brítez Ojeda	(substituted off) 55'
MF	(Argentina) Elvio Fredrich	(substituted off) 63'
FW	(Argentina) Matías Orieta	(substituted off) 46'
FW	(Argentina) Facundo Diz
Substitutions:
MF	(Argentina) Fernando Luna	(substituted on) 46'
FW	(Uruguay) Mathías Saavedra	(substituted on) 55'
FW	(Argentina) Alejandro Quintana	(substituted on) 63'
Manager:
(Argentina) Ricardo Caruso Lombardi

GK	(Argentina) Carlos Kletnicki
DF	(Argentina) Juan Celaya
DF	(Argentina) Matías Valdez
DF	(Argentina) Rubén Zamponi
DF	(Argentina) Jorge Demaio
MF	(Argentina) Renso Pérez
MF	(Argentina) Diego Núñez	(substituted off) 80'
MF	(Argentina) Horacio Falcón
MF	(Argentina) Mauro Frattini	(substituted off) 55'
FW	(Argentina) Javier Rossi
FW	(Argentina) Ezequiel Cérica	(substituted off) 64'
Substitutions:
MF	(Argentina) Diego Grecco	(substituted on) 55'
MF	(Argentina) Esteban Pereyra	(substituted on) 64'
DF	(Argentina) Juan Ferreira	(substituted on) 80'
Manager:
(Argentina) Sergio Rondina

Note: Villa Dálmine won 2–1 on aggregate, promoting to Primera B Nacional.
