= Sergio Rondina =

Argentine footballer and manager

Personal information
- Full name: Sergio Gabriel Rondina
- Date of birth: 11 March 1971 (age 55)
- Place of birth: San Antonio de Padua, Argentina
- Height: 1.69 m (5 ft 7 in)
- Position: Midfielder

Team information
- Current team: Chacarita Juniors (manager)

Youth career
- Deportivo Merlo

Senior career*
| Years | Team | Apps | (Gls) |
| 1992–1998 | Arsenal de Sarandí | 195 | (12) |
| 1998–1999 | Chacarita Juniors | 34 | (2) |
| 1999–2000 | Estudiantes de Río Cuarto | 0 | (0) |
| 2000–2001 | Defensa y Justicia | 16 | (1) |
| 2002–2003 | Atlanta | 24 | (0) |
| 2003 | Técnico Universitario | 8 | (0) |
| 2004 | Argentino de Quilmes | 5 | (0) |
| Total | | 282 | (15) |

Managerial career
- 2005–2006: Midland
- 2006: Cañuelas
- 2006–2007: Colegiales
- 2007–2008: Luján
- 2008–2010: Excursionistas
- 2010–2012: Flandria
- 2012–2013: Atlanta
- 2013: Platense
- 2013–2015: Dálmine
- 2015–2016: Arsenal de Sarandí
- 2016–2017: Nueva Chicago
- 2017: Los Andes
- 2018–2021: Arsenal de Sarandí
- 2021–2022: Central Córdoba
- 2022: Colón
- 2023: Barracas Central
- 2024: Sarmiento
- 2024–2025: Quilmes
- 2025–2026: Ferro Carril Oeste
- 2026–: Chacarita Juniors
- * Club domestic league appearances and goals

Sergio Gabriel Rondina (born 11 March 1971) is an Argentine football manager and former player who played as a midfielder. He is the current manager of Chacarita Juniors.

== Career ==
Rondina was a footballer who played professionally in Argentina and Ecuador in the 1990s and early 2000s. He began his career, and had the longest stint with Arsenal de Sarandí. He became a football manager in 2005 in the lower divisions of Argentina, and worked his way up to the Argentine Primera División.

== Personal life ==
Rondina is known for his colorful outfits, having a collection of over 40 suits. Since 2016, he has worn a different outfit to every matchday.
