= 2018–19 Primera B Nacional =

34th season of the second-tier football league in Argentina

Primera B Nacional
- Season: 2018–19
- Dates: 25 August 2018 – 8 June 2019
- Champions: Arsenal (1st title)
- Promoted: Arsenal; Central Córdoba (SdE)
- Relegated: Los Andes; Olimpo
- Matches: 315
- Goals: 648 (2.06 per match)
- Top goalscorer: 3 players (15 goals each)

The 2018–19 Argentine Primera B Nacional was the 34th season of the Argentine second division. The season began on 25 August 2018 and ended on 8 June 2019. Twenty-five teams competed in the league, seventeen returning from the 2017–18 season, four teams that were relegated from Primera División and two teams promoted from Federal A and B Metropolitana.

== Competition format ==
Twenty-five teams played each other once for a total of twenty-four matches each. The champion earns promotion to the Primera División. The teams placed from 2nd to 9th place competed in the "Torneo Reducido" for the second promotion berth after the regular season ended. Two teams were relegated at the end of the season; one with indirect affiliation with AFA was relegated to the Torneo Federal A, while one directly affiliated faced relegation to Primera B Metropolitana.

== Club information ==
=== Stadia and locations ===
Locations of the 2018–19 Primera B Nacional teams outside Greater Buenos Aires.
Locations of the 2018–19 Primera B Nacional teams within Greater Buenos Aires.

Club	City	Stadium
Agropecuario Argentino	Carlos Casares	Ofelia Rosenzuaig
Almagro	José Ingenieros	Tres de Febrero
Arsenal	Sarandí	Julio Humberto Grondona
Atlético de Rafaela	Rafaela	Nuevo Monumental
Brown	Adrogué	Lorenzo Arandilla
Central Córdoba	Santiago del Estero	Alfredo Terrera
Chacarita Juniors	Villa Maipú	Chacarita Juniors
Defensores de Belgrano	Buenos Aires	Juan Pasquale
Deportivo Morón	Morón	Nuevo Francisco Urbano
Ferro Carril Oeste	Buenos Aires	Arquitecto Ricardo Etcheverry
Gimnasia y Esgrima	Mendoza	Víctor Legrotaglie
Gimnasia y Esgrima	Jujuy	23 de Agosto
Guillermo Brown	Puerto Madryn	Raúl Conti
Independiente Rivadavia	Mendoza	Bautista Gargantini
Instituto	Córdoba	Presidente Perón
Los Andes	Lomas de Zamora	Eduardo Gallardón
Mitre	Santiago del Estero	Doctores José y Antonio Castiglione
Nueva Chicago	Buenos Aires	Nueva Chicago
Olimpo	Bahía Blanca	Roberto Natalio Carminatti
Platense	Florida Este	Ciudad de Vicente López
Quilmes	Quilmes	Centenario
Santamarina	Tandil	Municipal Gral. San Martín
Sarmiento	Junín	Eva Perón
Temperley	Temperley	Alfredo Beranger
Villa Dálmine	Campana	Villa Dálmine

=== Personnel ===
Club	Manager
Agropecuario Argentino	(Uruguay) Felipe De la Riva
Almagro	(Argentina) Sergio Gómez - Favio Orsi
Arsenal	(Argentina) Sergio Rondina
Atlético de Rafaela	(Argentina) Juan Manuel Llop
Brown	(Argentina) Pablo Vicó
Central Córdoba (SdE)	(Argentina) Gustavo Coleoni
Chacarita Juniors	(Argentina) Patricio Pisano
Defensores de Belgrano	(Argentina) Fabián Nardozza
Deportivo Morón	(Argentina) Alejandro Méndez - Walter Pico
Ferro Carril Oeste	(Uruguay) Alejandro Orfila
Gimnasia y Esgrima (J)	(Paraguay) Carlos Morales Santos
Gimnasia y Esgrima (M)	(Argentina) José María Blanco
Guillermo Brown	(Argentina) Luciano Theiler
Independiente Rivadavia	(Argentina) Nicolás Medina
Instituto	(Argentina) Diego Cagna
Los Andes	(Argentina) Aníbal Biggeri
Mitre (SdE)	(Argentina) Alfredo Grelak
Nueva Chicago	(Colombia) Wálter Perazzo
Olimpo	(Argentina) Darío Bonjour
Platense	(Argentina) Fernando Ruíz
Quilmes	(Argentina) Diego Colotto
Santamarina	(Argentina) Guillermo Pereyra
Sarmiento (J)	(Argentina) Iván Delfino
Temperley	(Argentina) Cristián Aldirico
Villa Dálmine	(Argentina) Walter Otta

== League table ==
Pos	Team	Pld	W	D	L	GF	GA	GD	Pts	Promotion or Qualification
1	Sarmiento (J)	24	12	10	2	32	14	+18	46	Championship play-off for promotion to Primera División
2	Arsenal (C, P)	24	13	7	4	36	19	+17	46	Championship play-off for promotion to Primera División
3	Nueva Chicago	24	12	6	6	32	25	+7	42	Qualification to Torneo Reducido
4	Almagro	24	11	7	6	26	21	+5	40	Qualification to Torneo Reducido
5	Platense	24	11	6	7	30	18	+12	39	Qualification to Torneo Reducido
6	Central Córdoba (SdE) (P)	24	9	10	5	27	24	+3	37	Qualification to Torneo Reducido
7	Gimnasia y Esgrima (M)	24	10	7	7	28	31	−3	37	Qualification to Torneo Reducido
8	Independiente Rivadavia	24	9	9	6	25	19	+6	36	Qualification to Torneo Reducido
9	Brown	24	9	9	6	20	17	+3	36	Qualification to Torneo Reducido
10	Ferro Carril Oeste	24	10	5	9	33	32	+1	35	
11	Mitre (SdE)	24	10	5	9	27	30	−3	35	
12	Agropecuario Argentino	24	8	10	6	16	13	+3	34	
13	Villa Dálmine	24	8	9	7	30	25	+5	33	
14	Temperley	24	8	7	9	26	27	−1	31	
15	Deportivo Morón	24	7	9	8	21	25	−4	30	
16	Defensores de Belgrano	24	7	8	9	20	24	−4	29	
17	Atlético de Rafaela	24	7	5	12	23	25	−2	26	
18	Quilmes	24	5	11	8	24	27	−3	26	
19	Gimnasia y Esgrima (J)	24	5	10	9	22	27	−5	25	
20	Guillermo Brown	24	6	7	11	19	24	−5	25	
21	Olimpo	24	7	4	13	24	36	−12	25	
22	Instituto	24	6	6	12	26	32	−6	24	
23	Santamarina	24	5	9	10	21	29	−8	24	
24	Chacarita Juniors	24	6	6	12	17	30	−13	24	
25	Los Andes	24	4	8	12	13	24	−11	20	

Source: AFA
Rules for classification: 1) points; 2) play-off (only for deciding promotion or relegation); 3) goal difference; 4) goals scored; 5) head-to-head points; 6) head-to-head goal difference; 7) head-to-head goals scored.
(C) Champions; (P) Promoted

=== Championship play-off ===
Sarmiento (J) and Arsenal ended up tied in points at the end of the 24 weeks of regular season. Tournament rules establish that, unlike any other position on the table, if two or more teams are equal in points at the end of play, goal difference does not count and a playoff game is required. The winner of this match achieved promotion to the Primera División as champions, while the loser qualified to the Torneo Reducido as runners-up.

28 April 2019
15:00

Arsenal	1–0	Sarmiento (J)
Garate 17' (pen.)	Report 1 Report 2

Estadio Florencio Sola, Banfield
Referee: Néstor Pitana

Team details

Arsenal
Sarmiento (J)

GK	1	(Argentina) Maximiliano Gagliardo
DF	4	(Argentina) Fernando Torrent
DF	2	(Argentina) Fabio Pereyra
DF	6	(Argentina) Rubén Zamponi
DF	3	(Argentina) Emiliano Papa
MF	8	(Argentina) Jesús Soraire	Yellow card
MF	5	(Argentina) Emiliano Méndez	Yellow card
MF	10	(Argentina) Lucas Necul		(substituted off) a'
MF	11	(Argentina) Gastón Álvarez
FW	7	(Argentina) Ezequiel Cérica		(substituted off) b'
FW	9	(Argentina) Leandro Garate	Yellow card	(substituted off) c'
Substitutions:
MF	14	(Argentina) Alejo Antilef		(substituted on) a'
FW	15	(Argentina) Facundo Pons		(substituted on) b'
MF	16	(Argentina) Ramiro López		(substituted on) c'
Manager:
(Argentina) Sergio Rondina

GK	1	(Argentina) Manuel Vicentini (c)
DF	4	(Argentina) Yamil Garnier
DF	2	(Argentina) Wilfredo Olivera
DF	6	(Argentina) Lucas Landa
DF	3	(Argentina) Facundo Castet	Yellow card	(substituted off) a'
MF	8	(Argentina) Franco Leys
MF	5	(Argentina) Guillermo Farré	Yellow card	(substituted off) b'
MF	10	(Argentina) Leonardo Villalba		(substituted off) c'
MF	11	(Argentina) Nicolás Castro
FW	7	(Argentina) Nicolás Miracco
FW	9	(Argentina) Nicolás Orsini
Substitutions:
FW	18	(Argentina) Sebastián Penco		(substituted on) a'
MF	17	(Argentina) Matías Garrido		(substituted on) b'
FW	14	(Argentina) Sergio Quiroga		(substituted on) c'
Manager:
(Argentina) Iván Delfino

== Results ==
Home \ Away	AGA	ALM	ARS	ATR	BRO	CCO	CHA	DBE	DMO	FCO	GEJ	GEM	GBR	IND	INS	LAN	MIT	NCH	OLI	PLA	QUI	SAN	SAR	TEM	VDA
Agropecuario Argentino				2–0		1–1	0–0	1–0		2–1			0–0	0–0						2–0		2–1	0–0	1–1	0–0
Almagro	1–1			1–0		1–3	1–0	3–0		1–2		0–0	1–1	1–0								2–0	0–2	2–1	
Arsenal	2–0	0–0			2–1				1–0		1–1	3–1			1–2	1–1	3–0	2–0	2–0		4–1				
Atlético de Rafaela			0–0		3–1	2–2			0–1		2–1				1–0		0–1	0–1	2–0	1–1	2–1				0–1
Brown	0–0	1–1					3–0	1–1				1–0		1–0		0–0		2–1	3–0			1–1	0–3	0–1	
Central Córdoba (SdE)			1–1		1–1				1–1		2–0				1–3	1–0	1–1	1–2	1–1	1–0	1–0				1–0
Chacarita Juniors			0–2	1–0		0–0				0–1	1–0		3–1	0–2	2–2		0–2			0–2			1–3		2–1
Defensores de Belgrano			0–1	0–3		2–0	1–2			2–0			1–0	1–1						1–2		1–0	0–0	0–0	2–1
Deportivo Morón	1–0	0–2			0–1		0–0	1–1				0–0				3–0		1–1	1–0		1–0	2–0		1–3	
Ferro Carril Oeste			2–1	2–1	1–0	1–3			5–1		1–2		2–0		1–1		2–0			0–2	1–1				2–0
Gimnasia y Esgrima (J)	0–0	0–1			2–0			0–0	1–1			1–2			1–0	1–1	1–0	1–2	1–1		0–0				
Gimnasia y Esgrima (M)	1–0			2–1		2–0	2–1	1–0		3–1			2–1	1–0						0–3		3–3	0–2	2–1	
Guillermo Brown			0–2	2–0	0–1	0–0			3–1		0–1				1–0		3–0	0–1		0–0	2–1				2–2
Independiente Rivadavia			1–1	1–1		2–0			1–1	0–1	3–1		1–0		2–0		0–1			1–0			0–0		2–1
Instituto	0–1	1–1			0–1			4–3	0–2			1–1				0–1	1–0	2–3	4–0		1–1	1–2			
Los Andes	0–1	0–1		0–2			0–1	1–1		1–1		2–2	0–0	0–1								2–0	0–1	1–0	
Mitre (SdE)	2–1	2–4			0–1			1–0	1–0			2–0				2–1		1–1	3–4		1–1	2–2		2–1	
Nueva Chicago	1–0	0–0					1–1	0–0		2–0		4–1		2–2		1–0			1–0			0–1	1–0	4–1	
Olimpo	1–0	2–0					2–1	0–1		2–1		1–1	2–0	2–3		1–1						3–1	0–1	0–2	
Platense		3–1	3–0		0–0				2–0		1–0				2–1	0–1	0–1	3–0	2–1		1–2				0–0
Quilmes	0–1	0–1			0–0		2–1	1–2				1–1		2–2		2–0		3–2	3–1			0–0		1–1	
Santamarina			0–0	1–0		1–2	2–0			3–1	2–2		0–2	0–0						1–1			0–1	0–1	0–0
Sarmiento (J)			2–0	1–1		1–1			1–1	2–2	1–1		3–1		1–1		1–0			3–1	0–0				2–1
Temperley			2–3	2–1		1–2	0–0			2–2	1–0		0–0	2–0	0–1					1–1			2–1		0–2
Villa Dálmine		2–0	1–3		0–0				1–1		4–4	2–0			3–0	1–0	2–2	3–1	1–0		1–1				

Updated to match(es) played on 22 April 2019. Source: AFA
Legend: Blue = home team win; Yellow = draw; Red = away team win.

== Torneo Reducido ==
Teams ending between second and ninth place played the Torneo Reducido for the second promotion berth to Primera División. Quarterfinals and semi-finals were played over two legs, and in case of a tie the best-placed team advanced. The finals were played over two legs, and a penalty shootout occurred in case of a tie.

Quarterfinals
2	Sarmiento (J) (bsr)	1	0	1
9	Brown	0	1	1
5	Platense	0	0	0
6	Central Córdoba (SdE)	0	1	1
(Pairings are reseeded after the first round)
3	Nueva Chicago	1	2	3
8	Independiente Rivadavia	4	2	6
4	Almagro (bsr)	1	2	3
7	Gimnasia y Esgrima (M)	1	2	3

Semi-finals
2	Sarmiento (J)	1	2	3
8	Independiente Rivadavia	0	0	0
4	Almagro	1	1	2
6	Central Córdoba (SdE)	2	2	4

Final
2	Sarmiento (J)	1	0	1 (3)
6	Central Córdoba (SdE)	1	0	1 (5)

=== Final ===
Torneo Reducido Final
(2nd. promotion playoff)
1 Jun 2019
First leg

Central Córdoba (SdE)	1–1	Sarmiento (J)
	Report

Estadio Alfredo Terrera, Santiago del Estero

8 Jun 2019
Second leg

Sarmiento (J)	0–0 (a.e.t.)	Central Córdoba (SdE)
	Report 1 Report 2
Penalties
Kippes (penalty scored); Castro (penalty scored); Villalba (penalty scored); Leys (penalty missed)	3–5	Jara (penalty scored); Rossi (penalty scored); Melivilo (penalty scored); Vera Oviedo (penalty scored); Ramírez (penalty scored)

Estadio Eva Perón, Junín
Referee: Fernando Espinoza

Team details

Sarmiento (J)
Central Córdoba (SdE)

GK	1	Manuel Vicentini
DF	4	Yamil Garnier
DF	2	Wilfredo Olivera	Yellow card
DF	6	Lucas Landa	Yellow card
DF	3	Facundo Castet
MF	10	Matías Garrido		(substituted off) a'
MF	8	Franco Leys
MF	5	Guillermo Farré		(substituted off) b'
MF	11	Nicolás Castro
FW	9	Nicolás Orsini		(substituted off) c'
FW	7	Nicolás Miracco
Substitutions:
DF	13	Ariel Kippes		(substituted on) c'
FW	15	Sergio Quiroga		(substituted on) b'
FW	16	Leonardo Villalba		(substituted on) a' (yellow card)
Manager:
(Argentina) Iván Delfino

GK	1	César Taborda
DF	4	Cristian Díaz
DF	2	Alexis Ferrero
DF	6	Hugo Vera Oviedo	Yellow card
DF	3	Jonathan Bay
MF	8	Alfredo Ramírez
MF	5	Cristian Vega	Yellow card
MF	7	Santiago Gallucci		(substituted off) a'
MF	11	Marcos Sánchez		(substituted off) b'
FW	10	Nahuel Luján		(substituted off) c'
FW	9	Javier Rossi
Substitutions:
MF	15	Renso Pérez		(substituted on) a'
FW	16	Facundo Melivilo		(substituted on) b' (yellow card)
FW	18	Diego Jara		(substituted on) b'
Manager:
(Argentina) Gustavo Coleoni

Note: After the series ended 1–1 on aggregate, Central Córdoba won 5–3 on penalties, promoting to Primera División.

== Relegation ==
Clubs with indirect affiliation with AFA are relegated to the Torneo Federal A, while clubs directly affiliated face relegation to Primera B Metropolitana. The bottom team of each table was relegated.

=== Direct Affiliation ===
Pos	Team	2016–17 Pts	2017–18 Pts	2018–19 Pts	Total Pts	Total Pld	Avg	Relegation
1	Arsenal	—	—	46	46	24	1.917	
2	Sarmiento (J)	—	37	46	83	48	1.729	
3	Platense	—	—	39	39	24	1.625	
4	Almagro	60	41	40	141	92	1.533	
5	Brown	65	37	36	138	92	1.5	
6	Chacarita Juniors	77	—	24	101	68	1.485	
7	Nueva Chicago	60	25	42	127	92	1.38	
8	Ferro Carril Oeste	60	26	35	121	92	1.315	
9	Deportivo Morón	—	33	30	63	48	1.313	
10	Temperley	—	—	31	31	24	1.292	
11	Villa Dálmine	47	36	33	116	92	1.261	
12	Defensores de Belgrano	—	—	29	29	24	1.208	
13	Quilmes	—	32	26	58	48	1.208	
14	Los Andes (R)	59	27	20	106	92	1.152	Primera B Metropolitana

=== Indirect Affiliation ===
Pos	Team	2016–17 Pts	2017–18 Pts	2018–19 Pts	Total Pts	Total Pld	Avg	Relegation
1	Central Córdoba (SdE)	—	—	37	37	24	1.542	
2	Gimnasia y Esgrima (M)	—	—	37	37	24	1.542	
3	Independiente Rivadavia	67	31	36	134	92	1.457	
4	Agropecuario Argentino	—	35	34	69	48	1.438	
5	Mitre (SdE)	—	32	35	67	48	1.396	
6	Guillermo Brown	75	28	25	128	92	1.391	
7	Instituto	63	37	24	124	92	1.348	
8	Atlético de Rafaela	—	36	26	62	48	1.292	
9	Gimnasia y Esgrima (J)	52	34	25	111	92	1.207	
10	Santamarina	61	24	24	109	92	1.185	
11	Olimpo (R)	—	—	25	25	24	1.042	Torneo Federal A

== Season statistics ==
=== Top scorers ===
Rank	Player	Club	Goals
1	(Argentina) Enzo Díaz	Ferro Carril Oeste	15
1	(Argentina) Patricio Cucchi	Gimnasia y Esgrima (M)	15
1	(Argentina) Pablo Vegetti	Instituto	15
4	(Argentina) Nicolás Orsini	Sarmiento (J)	12
5	(Argentina) Javier Rossi	Central Córdoba (SdE)	10
5	(Argentina) Nicolás Miracco	Sarmiento (J)	10
7	(Argentina) Nicolás Franco	Nueva Chicago	9
7	(Argentina) Juan Sánchez Sotelo	Nueva Chicago	9
7	(Argentina) Cristian Tarragona	Platense	9
7	(Argentina) Federico Anselmo	Quilmes	9
7	(Argentina) Ijiel Protti	Villa Dálmine	9

== See also ==
- 2018–19 Argentine Primera División
- 2018–19 Torneo Federal A
- 2018–19 Copa Argentina
