= Villa Dálmine =

- Full name: Club Villa Dálmine
- Nickname: Viola
- Founded: 20 November 1957; 68 years ago
- Ground: El Coliseo, Campana
- Capacity: 12,000
- Chairman: Alejandro Guzmán
- Manager: Ariel Fuscaldo
- League: Primera B
- 2023: Primera Nacional Zone B, 18th (Relegated)
- Website: http://villadalmine.com.ar/
Home colours	Away colours	Third colours

Club Villa Dálmine is an Argentine football club from Campana, Buenos Aires Province. The team currently plays in Primera B, the third level of the Argentine football league system.

Due to a financial crisis, the club was named "Club Atlético Campana" between 1993 and February 2000, after which it reassumed its original and current name.

== History ==
At the end of the 1950s the "Dálmine SAFTA" factory, sited in the city of Campana, Buenos Aires Province, founded a social club with the purpose of allowing its employees to practice sports. The club was named "Villa Dálmine", and established its first location on Chiclana street in that city.

The color adopted for the club was violet, therefore the club and its fans have been familiarly called "El Viola" (an expression derived from the word "violeta" in Spanish) since then. In 1960, Dálmine joined Liga Campanense de Fútbol with a team mostly formed by workers and administrative employees of the company. One year later, Villa Dálmine became affiliated with Torneo de Aficionados (currently Primera D), becoming champion that same year, and subsequently was promoted to the upper division, Primera C. The team scored the most goals and received the fewest goals during that season.

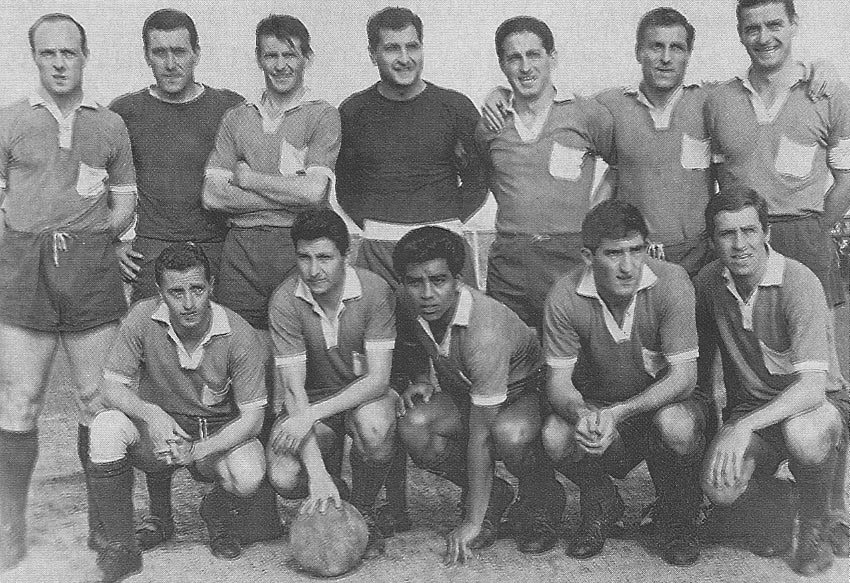
The 1963 team that won the Primera C title.

That first champion was coached by José "Perico" Marante and the most frequent line-up was: Masuelli, Gutiérrez, Coronel, Dopazo, Chiarle, Monteiro, Burián, Menéndez, Montero, Cesáreo, Torello and Moyano. Most of those players were professionals unlike Primera D players, who usually are amateur and they had other jobs to make a living. In 1963, two years after promoting to Primera C, Villa Dálmine won another title, promoting to Primera B Metropolitana. Because two teams had finished the season sharing the first position with 52 points each, a playoff series had to be played in order to determine a champion. The rival was All Boys and Dálmine won the series, after the first game ended 0–0 and the second was won by El Viola 1–0.

Peruvian Jorge Benítez, a skilled player, was the most notable footballer of that team. He is also regarded by fans as the best Dálmine player ever.

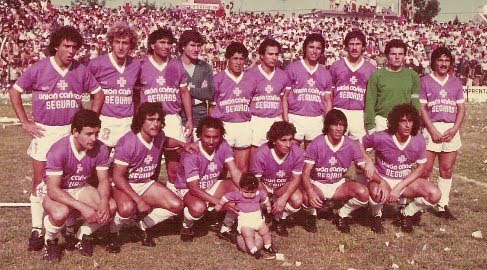
The 1975 squad that won another Primera C championship, scoring 113 goals. That team was nicknamed "The Netherlands of the C"

Despite all those achievements, Villa Dálmine would be relegated soon, although the team would win another Primera C title in 1975, returning to B Metropolitana (simply "Primera B" by then). The team made a great campaign that season, totaling 60 points in 36 matches played. Because of its bright play and high accuracy, it was nicknamed "The Netherlands of the C", making a comparison with the renowned 1974 Dutch football team led by Johan Cruyff, which was also known as "The Clockwork Orange" because of the extraordinary playing style they had shown on the field.

In the 1980s, Dálmine was relegated to Primera C. Four years later, the club moved to Primera B. During those times the club created a Football School, with the purpose of promoting the practise of football among the children from Campana. Some of them would take part of the first team in successive years.

In 1985, the club was split into two institutions, so "Villa Dálmine" became a club focused exclusively on football. On the other hand, "Club Siderca" was established to host the rest of social and recreation activities.

During the 1990s, the club changed its name to "Atlético Campana", which was rejected by most of the fans, so the institution brought its name back in February 2000. In 2002 Dálmine won another title, the Primera C Apertura, with a roster formed by players such as Pedro Troglio, Roberto Monserrat, Raúl Cardozo, Mario Pobersnik and José Basualdo, nicknamed "Los Cinco Magníficos" ("The Magnificent Five"). In 2003 Basualdo retired as a player becoming team's coach.

== Honours ==
- Primera B (1): 1988–89
- Primera C (3): 1963, 1975, 1982, 1995–96, 2011–12
- Primera D (2): 1961
