= 2017–18 Atlético Tucumán season =

Atlético Tucumán
2017–18 season
- Chairman: Mario Leito
- Manager: Ricardo Zielinski
- Stadium: Estadio Monumental José Fierro
- Primera División: 15th
- 2016–17 Copa Argentina: Runners-up
- 2017–18 Copa Argentina: Round of 64
- Copa Sudamericana: Round of 16
- Top goalscorer: League: Luis Rodríguez (4); All: Luis Rodríguez (10)

The 2017–18 season is Atlético Tucumán's 3rd consecutive season in the top-flight of Argentine football. The season covers the period from 1 July 2017 to 30 June 2018.

== Current squad ==
As of 24 August 2017.

Note: Flags indicate national team as defined under FIFA eligibility rules; some limited exceptions apply. Players may hold more than one non-FIFA nationality.

No.	Pos.	Nation	Player
1	GK	ARG	Cristian Lucchetti
7	FW	ARG	Luis Miguel Rodríguez
8	MF	ARG	Guillermo Acosta
12	GK	ARG	Franco Pizzicanella
14	MF	ARG	Emanuel Molina
15	MF	ARG	Gastón Iturrieta
19	MF	ARG	David Barbona
20	FW	ARG	Fabio Álvarez
22	MF	ARG	Franco Quiroga
25	MF	ARG	David Valdez
26	MF	COL	Jairo Palomino
29	MF	ARG	Rodrigo Aliendro
30	MF	ARG	Matías Ballini
34	MF	ARG	Ezequiel Cirigliano
35	MF	ARG	Tomás Cuello
37	FW	ARG	Martín Peralta
38	MF	ARG	Mauricio Sanna
—	DF	ARG	Alejandro Melo (on loan from San Lorenzo)

No.	Pos.	Nation	Player
—	DF	ARG	Alejandro Montiel
—	GK	ARG	Alejandro Sánchez
—	DF	ARG	Cristian Villagra
—	MF	ARG	Dardo Miloc
—	GK	ARG	Facundo Daffonchio
—	DF	ARG	Francisco Grahl
—	DF	ARG	Franco Sbuttoni
—	DF	ARG	Gervasio Núñez
—	MF	URU	Gonzalo Freitas
—	FW	ARG	Hernán Hechalar
—	FW	ARG	Ismael Blanco
—	FW	URU	Mauricio Affonso
—	DF	ARG	Mauro Osores
—	DF	ARG	Nahuel Zárate
—	DF	ARG	Nicolás Romat
—	DF	URU	Rafael García (on loan from Nacional)
—	DF	ARG	Yonathan Cabral (on loan from Racing Club)

=== Out on loan ===
Note: Flags indicate national team as defined under FIFA eligibility rules; some limited exceptions apply. Players may hold more than one non-FIFA nationality.

No.	Pos.	Nation	Player
2	DF	ARG	Bruno Bianchi (at Newell's Old Boys until 30 June 2018)
4	DF	ARG	Ignacio Canuto (at Lanús until 30 June 2018)
5	MF	ARG	Nery Leyes (at Newell's Old Boys until 30 June 2018)

== Transfers ==
=== In ===
Date	Pos.	Name	From	Fee
6 July 2017	MF	(Argentina) David Barbona	(Argentina) Estudiantes	Undisclosed
6 July 2017	DF	(Argentina) Gervasio Núñez	(Argentina) Sarmiento	Undisclosed
6 July 2017	MF	(Argentina) Rodrigo Aliendro	(Argentina) Chacarita Juniors	Undisclosed
17 July 2017	DF	(Argentina) Nicolás Romat	(Argentina) Huracán	Undisclosed
18 July 2017	MF	(Uruguay) Gonzalo Freitas	(Uruguay) Liverpool Montevideo	Undisclosed
18 July 2017	DF	(Argentina) Nahuel Zárate	(Argentina) Unión Santa Fe	Undisclosed
27 July 2017	DF	(Argentina) Franco Sbuttoni	(Japan) Sagan Tosu	Undisclosed
1 August 2017	FW	(Uruguay) Mauricio Affonso	(Uruguay) Peñarol	Undisclosed
7 August 2017	GK	(Argentina) Alejandro Sánchez	(Argentina) Nueva Chicago	Undisclosed
11 August 2017	FW	(Argentina) Ismael Blanco	(Argentina) Colón	Undisclosed
13 August 2017	MF	(Argentina) Dardo Miloc	(Argentina) Gimnasia y Esgrima	Undisclosed
17 August 2017	DF	(Argentina) Cristian Villagra	(Argentina) Rosario Central	Undisclosed
23 August 2017	FW	(Argentina) Hernán Hechalar	(Colombia) Independiente Medellín	Undisclosed

=== Out ===
Date	Pos.	Name	To	Fee
1 July 2017	FW	(Argentina) Cristian Menéndez	(Mexico) Veracruz	Undisclosed
1 July 2017	FW	(Argentina) Gonzalo Ontivero	(Argentina) San Jorge	Undisclosed
2 July 2017	GK	(Argentina) Josué Ayala	(Argentina) Temperley	Undisclosed
6 July 2017	FW	(Argentina) Leandro González	(Cyprus) Omonia	Undisclosed
13 July 2017	FW	(Argentina) Fernando Zampedri	(Argentina) Rosario Central	Undisclosed
18 July 2017	DF	(Paraguay) Enrique Meza	(Paraguay) Guaraní	Undisclosed
20 August 2017	MF	(Argentina) Gastón Cuevas	(Argentina) Sportivo Italiano	Undisclosed

=== Loan in ===
Date from	Date to	Pos.	Name	From
6 July 2017	30 June 2018	DF	(Argentina) Alejandro Melo	(Argentina) San Lorenzo
20 July 2017	30 June 2018	DF	(Argentina) Yonathan Cabral	(Argentina) Racing Club
17 August 2017	30 June 2018	DF	(Uruguay) Rafael García	(Uruguay) Nacional

=== Loan out ===
Date from	Date to	Pos.	Name	To
8 July 2017	30 June 2018	DF	(Argentina) Bruno Bianchi	(Argentina) Newell's Old Boys
12 July 2017	30 June 2018	DF	(Argentina) Ignacio Canuto	(Argentina) Lanús
27 July 2017	30 June 2018	MF	(Argentina) Nery Leyes	(Argentina) Newell's Old Boys

== Friendlies ==
=== Pre-season ===
Win Draw Loss

8 August 2017 Friendly	Arsenal de Sarandí (Argentina)	0–1	(Argentina) Atlético Tucumán	Avellaneda, Argentina
		Report	G. Núñez	Stadium: Estadio Julio Humberto Grondona

8 August 2017 Friendly	Arsenal de Sarandí (Argentina)	1–2	(Argentina) Atlético Tucumán	Avellaneda, Argentina
	G. Gómez	Report	M. Osores; F. Grahl	Stadium: Estadio Julio Humberto Grondona

12 August 2017 Friendly	Tigre (Argentina)	Cancelled	(Argentina) Atlético Tucumán
		Report

15 August 2017 Friendly	Atlético Tucumán (Argentina)	5–3	(Argentina) San Jorge
	L. Rodríguez; D. Barbona; G. Núñez; Jiménez	Report	Goal

15 August 2017 Friendly	Atlético Tucumán (Argentina)	1–1	(Argentina) San Jorge
	Goal	Report	Goal

== Primera División ==
=== League table ===
Pos	Team	Pld	W	D	L	GF	GA	GD	Pts
13	Belgrano	27	10	10	7	29	28	+1	40
14	Vélez Sarsfield	27	10	8	9	31	32	−1	38
15	Atlético Tucumán	27	8	12	7	29	26	+3	36
16	Estudiantes (LP)	27	10	6	11	25	26	−1	36
17	Banfield	27	9	8	10	27	24	+3	35

Source: AFA
Rules for classification: 1) points; 2) play-off (only if needed to decide championship); 3) goal difference; 4) goals scored; 5) head-to-head points; 6) head-to-head goal difference; 7) head-to-head goals scored.

=== Results by matchday ===
Matchday	1	2	3	4	5	6	7	8	9	10	11	12	13	14	15	16	17	18	19	20	21	22	23	24	25	26	27
Ground	H	A	H	A	H	A	H	A	H	A	A	H	H														
Result	W	L	D	L	D	D	W	W	D	L	L	W															
Position	6	15	17	19	19	19	16	12	12	16	16	15															

Updated to match(es) played on 12 December 2017. Source: Soccerway
A = Away; H = Home; W = Win; D = Draw; L = Loss

27 August 2017 1	Atlético Tucumán (Argentina)	2–1	(Argentina) Godoy Cruz	San Miguel de Tucumán, Argentina
14:05	F. Sbuttoni 17'; L. Rodríguez 23'	Report	S. Olivarez 58'	Stadium: Estadio Monumental José Fierro; Referee: Jorge Baliño (Argentina)

8 September 2017 2	Vélez Sarsfield (Argentina)	2–0	(Argentina) Atlético Tucumán	Buenos Aires, Argentina
19:05	M. Romero 43', 73'	Report		Stadium: José Amalfitani Stadium; Referee: Germán Delfino (Argentina)

17 September 2017 3	Atlético Tucumán (Argentina)	1–1	(Argentina) Chacarita Juniors	San Miguel de Tucumán, Argentina
14:05	L. Rodríguez 60'	Report	J. Mendoza 23'	Stadium: Estadio Monumental José Fierro; Referee: Facundo Tello (Argentina)

22 September 2017 4	Patronato (Argentina)	2–1	(Argentina) Atlético Tucumán	Paraná, Argentina
21:05	A. Balboa 9'; S. Ribas 54'	Report	G. Freitas 72'	Stadium: Estadio Presbítero Bartolomé Grella; Referee: Silvio Trucco (Argentina)

29 September 2017 5	Atlético Tucumán (Argentina)	0–0	(Argentina) Belgrano	San Miguel de Tucumán, Argentina
21:05		Report		Stadium: Estadio Monumental José Fierro; Referee: Darío Herrera (Argentina)

15 October 2017 6	River Plate (Argentina)	2–2	(Argentina) Atlético Tucumán	Buenos Aires, Argentina
18:05	M. Casco 50'; R. Borré 53'	Report	L. Rodríguez 65'; I. Blanco 74'	Stadium: Estadio Monumental Antonio Vespucio Liberti; Referee: Federico Beligoy (Argentina)

28 October 2017 7	Atlético Tucumán (Argentina)	3–1	(Argentina) Racing Club	San Miguel de Tucumán, Argentina
18:20	F. Álvarez 4'; G. Acosta 17'; M. Barbieri 21' (o.g.)	Report	L. Martínez 45+4'	Stadium: Estadio Monumental José Fierro; Referee: Fernando Echenique (Argentina)

4 November 2017 8	Rosario Central (Argentina)	0–1	(Argentina) Atlético Tucumán	Rosario, Argentina
18:05		Report	G. Núñez 53'	Stadium: Estadio Gigante de Arroyito; Referee: Andrés Merlos (Argentina)

17 November 2017 9	Atlético Tucumán (Argentina)	0–0	(Argentina) Arsenal de Sarandí	San Miguel de Tucumán, Argentina
19:15		Report		Stadium: Estadio Monumental José Fierro; Referee: Germán Delfino (Argentina)

26 November 2017 10	Estudiantes (Argentina)	1–0	(Argentina) Atlético Tucumán	Quilmes, Argentina
17:00	B. Cejas 88'	Report		Stadium: Estadio Centenario Dr. José Luis Meiszner; Referee: Silvio Trucco (Argentina)

30 November 2017 11	San Lorenzo (Argentina)	2–0	(Argentina) Atlético Tucumán	Buenos Aires, Argentina
19:15	N. Blandi 6'; N. Reniero 82'	Report		Stadium: Estadio Pedro Bidegain; Referee: Ariel Penel (Argentina)

4 December 2017 12	Atlético Tucumán (Argentina)	2–0	(Argentina) Colón	San Miguel de Tucumán, Argentina
19:15	L. Rodríguez 24'; G. Acosta 90+2'	Report		Stadium: Estadio Monumental José Fierro; Referee: Andrés Merlos (Argentina)

January 2018 13	Atlético Tucumán (Argentina)	–	(Argentina) Temperley	San Miguel de Tucumán, Argentina
		Report		Stadium: Estadio Monumental José Fierro

== Copa Argentina ==
Win Draw Loss

19 September 2017 (Note: Match was originally scheduled for 17 August 2017 before being postponed.) R32	Independiente (Argentina)	1–2	(Argentina) Atlético Tucumán	Mendoza, Argentina
21:10	M. Meza 14'	Report	G. Freitas 57'; R. Aliendro 76'	Stadium: Estadio Malvinas Argentinas (Note: Original match was set to take place at the Estadio Ciudad de Lanús – Néstor Díaz Pérez.); Referee: Fernando Echenique (Argentina)

4 October 2017 R16	Atlético Tucumán (Argentina)	4–0	(Argentina) Sarmiento	Salta, Argentina
21:10	H. Hechalar 35'; I. Blanco 37'; D. Barbona 50'; A. Melo 88'	Report		Stadium: Estadio Padre Ernesto Martearena; Referee: Jorge Baliño (Argentina)

24 October 2017 QF	Atlético Tucumán (Argentina)	1–0	(Argentina) Vélez Sarsfield	Santa Fe, Argentina
21:10	F. Álvarez 66'	Report		Stadium: Estadio 15 de Abril; Referee: Facundo Tello (Argentina)

10 November 2017 SF	Atlético Tucumán (Argentina)	0–0 (3–1 p)	(Argentina) Rosario Central	Formosa, Argentina
20:00		Report		Stadium: Estadio Antonio Romero; Referee: Federico Beligoy (Argentina)
	Penalties
	D. Barbona (penalty scored); F. Grahl (penalty scored); F. Álvarez (penalty scored)		F. Carrizo (penalty scored); M. Ruben (penalty missed); D. Rodríguez (penalty missed); M. Martínez (penalty missed)

9 December 2017 Final	River Plate (Argentina)	2–1	(Argentina) Atlético Tucumán	Mendoza, Argentina
19:15	I. Scocco 10'; I. Fernández 48'	Report	L. Rodríguez 12'	Stadium: Estadio Malvinas Argentinas; Referee: Fernando Rapallini (Argentina)

== Copa Sudamericana ==
Win Draw Loss

=== Second stage ===
12 July 2017 First leg	Oriente Petrolero (Bolivia)	2–3	(Argentina) Atlético Tucumán	Santa Cruz de la Sierra, Bolivia
21:45	M. Freitas 1', 87'	Report	L. Rodríguez 63'; B. Bianchi 71'; F. Zampedri 88'	Stadium: Estadio Ramón Tahuichi Aguilera; Referee: Juan Albarracín (Ecuador)

1 August 2017 Second leg	Atlético Tucumán (Argentina)	3–0 (agg: 6–2)	(Bolivia) Oriente Petrolero	San Miguel de Tucumán, Argentina
21:45	L. Rodríguez 44', 50', 83'	Report		Stadium: Estadio Monumental José Fierro; Referee: Sandro Ricci (Brazil)

=== Round of 16 ===
22 August 2017 First leg	Atlético Tucumán (Argentina)	1–0	(Argentina) Independiente	San Miguel de Tucumán, Argentina
21:45	L. Rodríguez 43'	Report		Stadium: Estadio Monumental José Fierro; Referee: Anderson Daronco (Brazil)

12 September 2017 Second leg	Independiente (Argentina)	2–0 (agg: 2–1)	(Argentina) Atlético Tucumán	Avellaneda, Argentina
21:45	L. Fernández 17'; M. Benítez 83'	Report		Stadium: Estadio Libertadores de América; Referee: Andrés Cunha (Uruguay)
