= 2017 Copa Argentina final =

Argentina football tournament final

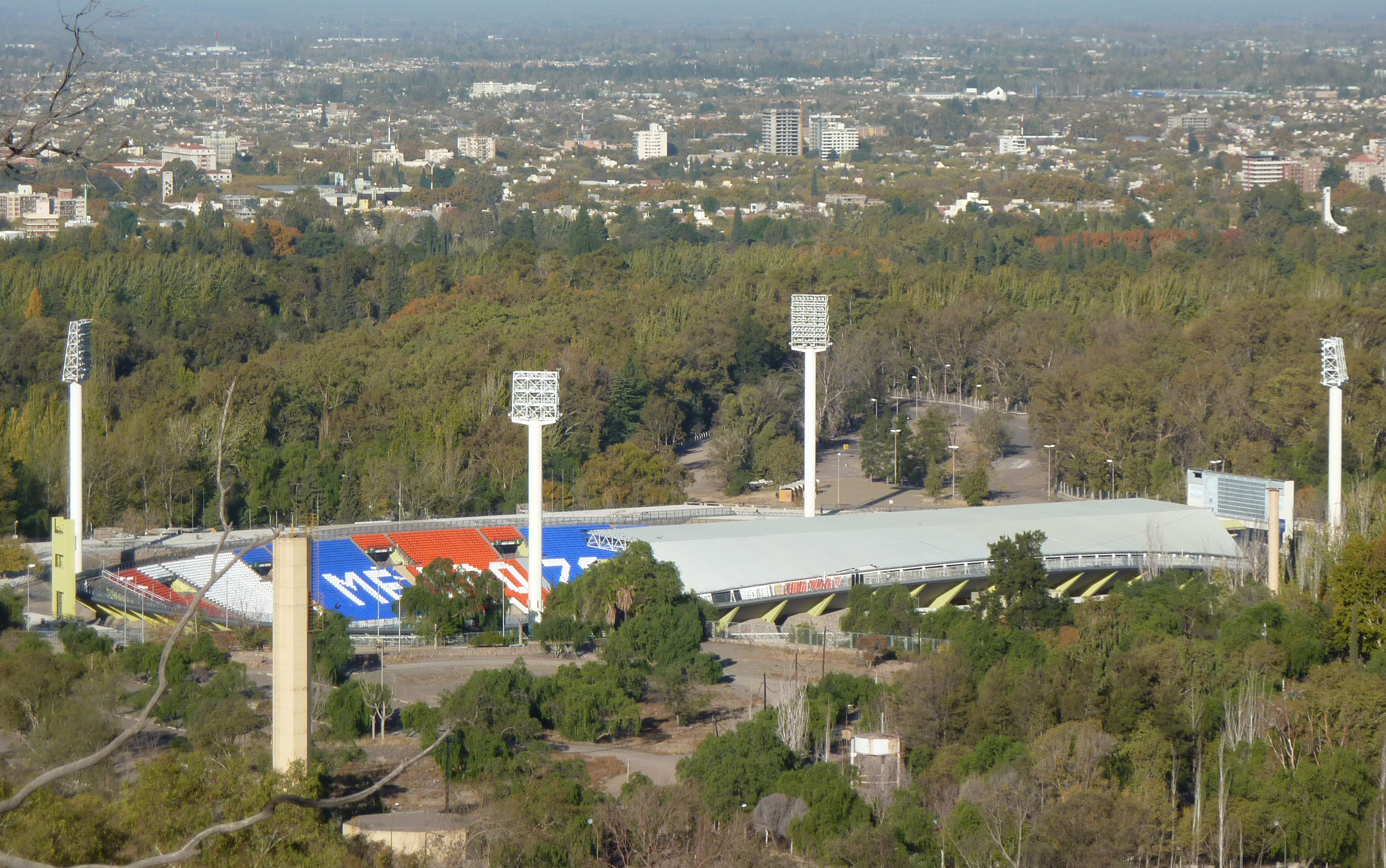
- The match was played at the Estadio Malvinas Argentinas.
- Event: 2016–17 Copa Argentina
River Plate	Atlético Tucumán
2	1
- Date: December 9, 2017
- Venue: Estadio Malvinas Argentinas, Mendoza
- Man of the Match: Enzo Pérez
- Referee: Fernando Rapallini
- Attendance: 42,500

The 2017 Copa Argentina final was a football match between River Plate and Atlético Tucumán on 9 December 2017 at the Estadio Malvinas Argentinas in Mendoza, Argentina. It was the final match of the 2016–17 Copa Argentina, the sixth edition of Argentine football's annual cup competition, organised by the Argentine Football Association (AFA). River Plate were the reigning champions, while Atlético Tucumán were appearing in the final for the first time.

As both teams were in the highest tier of the football league system in Argentina, the Primera División, they entered the competition in the final round. Matches up to the semi-final were contested on a one-off basis, with a penalty shoot-out taking place if any game ended tied after 90 minutes. All of River Plate's contests resulted in comfortable victories, while the majority of Atlético Tucumán's matches were close affairs, winning only a round by more than one goal.

Watched by a crowd of 42,500, River Plate took the lead in the first half when striker Ignacio Scocco scored, but Atlético Tucumán responded swiftly as Luis Miguel Rodríguez tied the game just two minutes later. The score would remain until early in the second half, when midfielder Ignacio Fernández unleveled the game in favour of River Plate. As no further goals were scored, River Plate secured their second Copa Argentina win.

== Route to the final ==
=== River Plate ===
River Plate's route to the final
Round	Opposition	Score
R64	Atlas	3–0
R32	Instituto	4–1
R16	Defensa y Justicia	3–0
QF	Atlanta	4–1
SF	Deportivo Morón	3–0

As a Primera División team, River Plate started their Copa Argentina campaign in the Round of 64, being drawn to play Primera D team Atlas at the Estadio Padre Ernesto Martearena. The match gave way to an early goal from River Plate when Lucas Alario assisted Gonzalo Martínez, who unleashed a shot to the near post from just outside the area. Nearing the end of the first half, Ignacio Fernández extended their lead when he headed the ball after a one-two passing play by Jorge Moreira and Enzo Pérez. In the final minutes of the game, Martínez converted a penalty to seal the 3–0 score. Their Round of 32 match saw them face Primera B Nacional side Instituto at the Estadio José María Minella. In the 38th minute, Martínez was sent off for River Plate for a disqualifying foul. Nonetheless, his team would open the scoring shortly after thanks to Alario. They extended this lead through Pérez, who found the net after a pass from Moreira. Their opposition managed shorten the deficit to one goal, but two further strikes courtesy of Jonatan Maidana and Rafael Santos Borré saw the match off.

In the Round of 16, they were paired against fellow Primera División team Defensa y Justicia at the Estadio Antonio Romero. River Plate scored their first goal in the 12th minute, when Ignacio Scocco converted a penalty. Just a minute later, the striker netted a brace when he chipped the ball over the opposing goalkeeper. In the closing stages of the game, Exequiel Palacios added one further to make it 3–0. Their opposition in the quarter-finals were another Primera B Nacional side in Atlanta, who they played at the Estadio San Juan del Bicentenario. The opening goal came at the end of the first half, when Scocco turned to the net and laid the ball off to Marcelo Saracchi, who unleashed a high, powerful shot on target to put River Plate ahead. Immediately after, Fernández caught a back pass and capitalised on the mistake, extending their lead. In the second half, Martínez added one further, before Atlanta scored through Adrián Martínez. The match ended 4–1, however, as Carlos Auzqui found the net six minutes from stoppage time. In the semi-finals, they faced Primera B Metropolitana team Deportivo Morón. At the Estadio Malvinas Argentinas, River Plate found the opening through a Martínez cross, which was finished by Férnandez. They scored again just three minutes later, after a low cross sent by Nicolás de la Cruz was connected by Maidana. In stoppage time of the closing half, Tomás Andrade found Borré, who sealed the final goal of the match. Courtesy of a 3–0 victory, River Plate side progressed into their second Copa Argentina final.

=== Atlético Tucumán ===
Atlético Tucumán's route to the final
Round	Opposition	Score
R64	All Boys	1–1 (4–1 p)
R32	Independiente	2–1
R16	Sarmiento (J)	4–0
QF	Vélez Sarsfield	1–0
SF	Rosario Central	0–0 (3–1 p)

Atlético Tucumán also started their campaign in the Round of 64, where they were drawn against Primera B Nacional team All Boys at the Estadio Padre Ernesto Martearena. Atlético Tucumán would start from behind as Maximiliano Salas scored 13 minutes in, after unveiling a low, angled shot that beat Cristian Lucchetti. All Boys held this lead until the 80th minute, when Luis Miguel Rodríguez scored from the spot after goalkeeper Nahuel Losada fouled Cristian Menéndez inside the area. No further goals were scored, and thus a penalty shoot-out was required. Atlético Tucumán scored all of their four penalties, while their opposition only managed one, sending themselves through. They went on to play Independiente in the Round of 32, a Primera División side. At the Estadio Malvinas Argentinas, Atlético Tucumán saw their opposition take the lead again, after Maximiliano Meza scored from a cross sent by Leandro Fernández. However, they managed to tie the game in the second half, following a team play that was finished by Gonzalo Freitas, and then completed the comeback when Rodrigo Aliendro scored 14 minutes from injury time.

Their opposition in the Round of 16 were Sarmiento (J), another Primera División team. The scoring at the Estadio Padre Ernesto Martearena was opened through Hernán Hechalar, who struck into the net a rebound from a Gervasio Núñez free kick, giving the advantage to Atlético Tucumán. They extended their lead just two minutes later, when Ismael Blanco scored through a header. Blanco later assisted David Barbona to add one further. In the 88th minute, Alejandro Melo sealed the final score of 4–0, and Atlético Tucumán advanced into the next round. In the quarter-finals, they played Vélez Sarsfield at the Estadio 15 de Abril. Their third Primera División opponents were awarded a penalty in the 50th minute, which Matías Vargas put wide. Furthermore, Yonathan Cabral was shown a red card, leaving Atlético Tucumán a man down. Nonetheless, Favio Álvarez scored for their side in the 66th minute, and they ultimately held this lead to qualify into the semi-finals. Their last opposition before the final were Rosario Central, who had reached the final in the three prior editions of the tournament. At the Estadio Antonio Romero, Rosario Central were given a penalty at the start of the second half, following a reckless challenge from Lucchetti on Washington Camacho. The midfielder stood up to take it, but the goalkeeper saved his effort. In diving, however, Lucchetti tore a tendon in his right shoulder, and was subsequently replaced with Alejandro Sánchez. The match would end goalless, and a penalty shoot-out was ordered. Atlético Tucumán scored all of their three spot kicks, while Rosario Central could only convert one out of four. As a result, Atlético Tucumán reached their first Copa Argentina final.

== Background ==
The Argentine Football Association (AFA) established the Copa Argentina in May 2011, as the national cup competition for the 2011–2012 Argentine football season. Since its inaugural edition, it has been held annually, albeit undergoing several format changes over the years.

The match was Atlético Tucumán's first appearance in a Copa Argentina final. In turn, River Plate were appearing for a second time; they were the reigning champions, after beating Rosario Central 4–3 in the 2016 final. It was the first meeting between the two sides in the competition.

Both teams had already faced each other during the 2017–18 Superliga Argentina, in a game that ended 2–2 nearly two months prior to the final. River Plate played their last match before the final on 3 December, in a 2–1 away loss against Gimnasia y Esgrima (LP). Atlético Tucumán faced Colón de Santa Fe a day later, winning 2–0 at their home ground of Estadio Monumental Jose Fierro.

== Match ==
=== Summary ===
==== First half ====
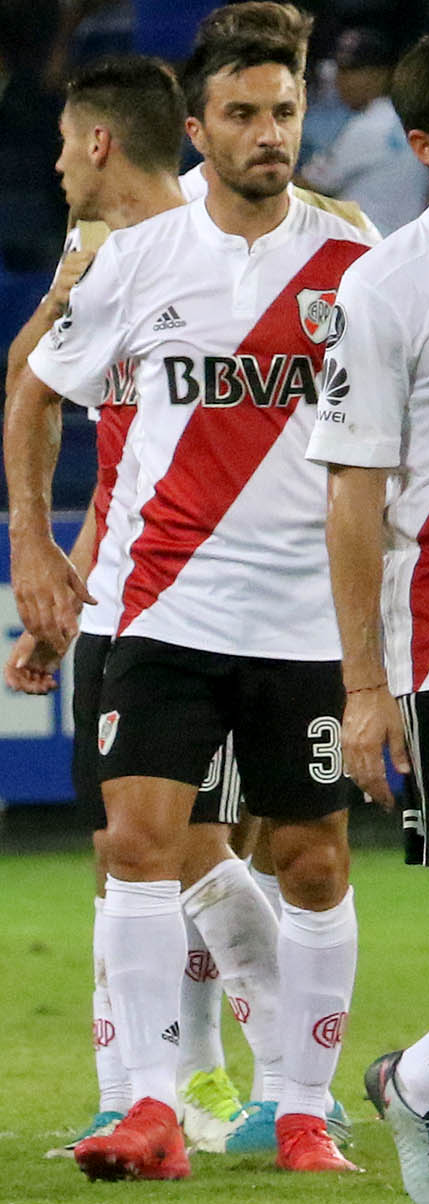
Ignacio Scocco, who scored the opening goal of the match.

River Plate took the initiative early in the match, starting with possession in the Atlético Tucumán half, and later nearing the opposing area. The strategy was a success, as they found the opening goal barely ten minutes in. Following a clearance from a corner kick, the ball was sent back into the penalty area, where Ignacio Scocco lurked. The striker, onside due to a late run from Rodrigo Aliendro, headed the ball over goalkeeper Alejandro Sánchez to put his team ahead. In response, Atlético Tucumán's Guillermo Acosta unveiled a low cross from the right shortly after. The delivery, which failed to be intercepted by centre-backs Jonatan Maidana and Javier Pinola, allowed Luis Miguel Rodríguez to score the equaliser after beating his marker Gonzalo Montiel to the challenge. River Plate attempted to regain the lead at the 19-minute mark, but Scocco shot just wide of the net. Atlético Tucumán would take advantage of the blow dealt to their opposition by becoming more incisive. They exploited the weaknesses in the River Plate defence, managing to create most of the remaining first half chances. In the 25th minute, Acosta found Gervasio Núñez, whose effort went high. Eight minutes later, David Barbona crossed for defender Yonathan Cabral, who headed the ball over the bar. The midfielder then sent the ball over to Rodríguez, whose header went once again high of the woodwork. Thus, the score remained for the opening half.

==== Second half ====
Two minutes after the restart, River Plate scored to retake the lead. Pinola started the play in the midfield, finding Marcelo Saracchi to his left. The full-back then crossed for Ignacio Fernández, who unleashed a powerful strike while unmarked to make it 2–1. Nine minutes later, Scocco found himself with a chance to extend their lead following a pass from Enzo Pérez. Although he only needed to beat Sánchez, the striker squandered the opportunity when he sent his shot over the crossbar. A later defensive blunder from Maidana left Rodríguez one-on-one goalkeeper Enrique Bologna. However, the Atlético Tucumán forward would also miss the mark, as he chipped the ball over the net. In the 62nd minute, River Plate manager Marcelo Gallardo replaced Ariel Rojas with Nicolás de la Cruz, who provided a cross seven minutes later that Maidana headed into the right post. The final minutes of the game saw four players booked in close succession. It was also during stoppage time when Atlético Tucumán created their last scoring prospect, as Ismael Blanco sent a cross over to Favio Álvarez, who could only manage a header that went high of the Bologna goal. Moments later, referee Fernando Rapallini blew the whistle with the final score of 2–1 to River Plate, who consequently won their second Copa Argentina title.

=== Details ===
December 9, 2017
19:15 UTC−3

River Plate	2–1	Atlético Tucumán
Scocco 9'; Fernández 48'	Report	Rodríguez 11'

Malvinas Argentinas, Mendoza
Attendance: 42,500
Referee: Fernando Rapallini

River Plate	Atlético Tucumán

GK	25	(Argentina) Enrique Bologna
RB	29	(Argentina) Gonzalo Montiel
CB	2	(Argentina) Jonatan Maidana
CB	22	(Argentina) Javier Pinola
LB	3	(Uruguay) Marcelo Saracchi
CM	23	(Argentina) Leonardo Ponzio (c)
CM	16	(Argentina) Ariel Rojas		(substituted off) 61'
RW	26	(Argentina) Ignacio Fernández
AM	24	(Argentina) Enzo Pérez	(yellow card) 55'	(substituted off) 67'
LW	10	(Argentina) Pity Martínez	(yellow card) 90'
CF	32	(Argentina) Ignacio Scocco		(substituted off) 81'
Substitutes:
GK	14	(Argentina) Germán Lux
DF	5	(Argentina) Alexander Barboza
DF	20	(Argentina) Milton Casco
MF	11	(Uruguay) Nicolás De La Cruz		(substituted on) 61'
MF	21	(Argentina) Iván Rossi
FW	17	(Argentina) Carlos Auzqui		(substituted on) 67'
FW	19	(Colombia) Rafael Santos Borré		(substituted on) 81'
Manager:
(Argentina) Marcelo Gallardo

GK	17	(Argentina) Alejandro Sánchez
RB	8	(Argentina) Guillermo Acosta	(yellow card) 86'
CB	31	(Argentina) Yonathan Cabral
CB	2	(Uruguay) Rafael García	(yellow card) 71'
LB	35	(Argentina) Cristian Villagra	(yellow card) 84'
CM	29	(Argentina) Rodrigo Aliendro	(yellow card) 86'
CM	32	(Argentina) Francisco Grahl		(substituted off) 65'
RW	19	(Argentina) David Barbona		(substituted off) 85'
AM	11	(Argentina) Favio Álvarez
LW	10	(Argentina) Gervasio Núñez		(substituted off) 59'
CF	7	(Argentina) Luis Miguel Rodríguez (c)
Substitutes:
GK	13	(Argentina) Franco Pizzicanella
DF	3	(Argentina) Nahuel Zárate
DF	4	(Argentina) Nicolás Romat
MF	5	(Uruguay) Gonzalo Freitas
MF	22	(Argentina) Alejandro Melo		(substituted on) 59'
FW	9	(Uruguay) Mauricio Affonso		(substituted on) 85'
FW	18	(Argentina) Ismael Blanco		(substituted on) 65'
Manager:
(Argentina) Ricardo Zielinski

Man of the Match
Enzo Pérez (River Plate)

Assistant referees
Sergio Viola
Alejandro Mazza
Fourth official
Hernán Mastrángelo

Match rules

- 90 minutes
- No extra-time
- Penalty shoot-out if necessary
- Seven named substitutes, of which up to three may be used

=== Statistics ===
Overall
Statistic	River Plate	Atlético Tucumán
Goals scored	2	1
Total shots	8	10
Shots on target	3	2
Ball possession	63%	37%
Corner kicks	4	2
Fouls committed	12	17
Offsides	1	3
Yellow cards	2	4
Red cards	0	0

== Post-match ==
Striker Ignacio Scocco had arrived to River Plate on 4 July. He had had a remarkable showing during the 2017 Copa Libertadores, in which he scored eight goals over three knockout stage matches. He reflected on both their semi-final loss and Copa Argentina win by stating: "We needed to finish this semester with a title; the defeat at the Copa Libertadores was a tough blow." He then added: "We've put in a lot of effort. Luckily, we can now celebrate with a victory [...] This group deserved it."

Enrique Bologna started in the final due to the poor performances from fellow goalkeepers Germán Lux and Augusto Batalla. Following the win, he commented on the chance he was given: "This is what I've worked for, and I'm really enjoying it. I feel great [...] It's a reward for the work I do every day."

Neither team would do well in the 2017–18 Superliga Argentina, as River Plate only managed an eighth position, while Atlético Tucumán finished 15th. However, both teams were set to participate in the 2018 Copa Libertadores. River Plate had already entered the competition by finishing in second place of the 2016–17 Argentine Primera División, allowing Atlético Tucumán to gain qualification as the Copa Argentina runners-up.

== See also ==
- 2016–17 Argentine Primera División
- 2017 Supercopa Argentina
- 2018 Copa Libertadores
