= Martín Peralta =

Argentine footballer (born 1997)

Personal information
- Full name: Martín Nicolás Peralta
- Date of birth: 8 April 1997 (age 29)
- Place of birth: San Miguel de Tucumán, Argentina
- Height: 1.85 m (6 ft 1 in)
- Position: Forward

Team information
- Current team: Villa Mitre

Youth career
- 2014–2017: Atlético Tucumán

Senior career*
Years	Team	Apps	(Gls)
2017–2022	Atlético Tucumán	2	(0)
2019	→ San Jorge (loan)	11	(3)
2019–2020	→ Estudiantes (loan)	9	(1)
2020–2021	→ San Martín (loan)	0	(0)
2021	→ Boca Unidos (loan)	21	(4)
2022–	Villa Mitre	45	(9)
- * Club domestic league appearances and goals as of 14:52, 8 July 2023 (UTC)

Martín Nicolás Peralta (born 8 April 1997) is an Argentine professional footballer who plays as a forward for Villa Mitre.

== Career ==
Atlético Tucumán were Peralta's first club, joining in 2014. After playing in the youth system, Peralta made his professional debut on 28 May 2017 in a 2–1 league defeat to Talleres; one further appearance followed in June against San Martín (SJ). January 2019 saw Peralta depart on loan to Torneo Federal A's San Jorge. He scored three goals in his first nine appearances, before netting seven in the play-offs; including a hat-trick over Sportivo Desamparados on 12 May. They'd eventually lose out to Alvarado. In July, newly promoted Primera B Nacional team Estudiantes loaned Peralta. One goal in nine matches followed.

In October 2020, Peralta was loaned out for a third time as he joined second tier side San Martín. Soon after signing, Peralta put out a controversial tweet to say it was a "dream come true" to join San Martín; who are rivals of Atlético Tucumán. He later claimed he didn't intend any disrespect towards his parent club.

== Career statistics ==
As of 11 October 2020.

Club statistics
Club	Season	League			Cup		League Cup		Continental		Other		Total	
Club	Season	Division	Apps	Goals	Apps	Goals	Apps	Goals	Apps	Goals	Apps	Goals	Apps	Goals
Atlético Tucumán	2016–17	Primera División	2	0	0	0	—		0	0	0	0	2	0
Atlético Tucumán	2017–18	Primera División	0	0	0	0	—		0	0	0	0	0	0
Atlético Tucumán	2018–19	Primera División	0	0	0	0	0	0	—		0	0	0	0
Atlético Tucumán	2019–20	Primera División	0	0	0	0	0	0	—		0	0	0	0
Atlético Tucumán	2020–21	Primera División	0	0	0	0	0	0	—		0	0	0	0
Atlético Tucumán	Total		2	0	0	0	—		0	0	0	0	2	0
San Jorge (loan)	2018–19	Torneo Federal A	11	3	1	0	—		—		6 (Note: Appearance(s) in the Torneo Federal A play-offs)	7	18	10
Estudiantes (loan)	2019–20	Primera B Nacional	9	1	0	0	—		—		0	0	9	1
San Martín (loan)	2020–21	Primera B Nacional	0	0	0	0	—		—		0	0	0	0
Career total			22	4	1	0	—		0	0	6	7	29	11
