= Alejandro Montiel (footballer) =

Argentine footballer (born 1993)

Personal information
- Full name: Andrés Alejandro Montiel
- Date of birth: 24 August 1993 (age 33)
- Place of birth: Mayor Vicente Villafañe, Argentina
- Height: 1.79 m (5 ft 10 in)
- Positions: Left-back; centre-back

Youth career
- Atlético Tucumán

Senior career*
| Years | Team | Apps | (Gls) |
| 2012–2018 | Atlético Tucumán | 2 | (0) |
| 2014–2015 | → San Jorge (loan) | 28 | (0) |
| 2018 | San Jorge | 4 | (0) |
| 2019–2020 | Güemes | 17 | (1) |
- * Club domestic league appearances and goals as of 21:31, 24 March 2020 (UTC)

Andrés Alejandro Montiel (born 24 August 1993) is an Argentine footballer who plays as a left-back or centre-back.

== Career ==
Montiel began his career with Primera B Nacional side Atlético Tucumán, after appearing on the bench once during the 2012–13 season he made his debut for the club on 8 June 2014 in a league match versus Sportivo Belgrano. Later that month, Montiel joined Torneo Federal A team San Jorge on loan. He made two appearances during the 2014 season prior to participating in twenty-six games in 2015, in the first of those twenty-six appearances he received his first career red card in a game against Altos Hornos Zapla. Montiel returned to San Jorge in June 2018, before signing for Torneo Regional Federal Amateur's Güemes in December.

== Career statistics ==
As of 2 January 2019.

Club statistics
| Club | Season | League | | | Cup (Note: Includes the Copa Argentina) | | League Cup | | Continental (Note: Includes the Copa Sudamericana) | | Other | | Total | |
| Club | Season | Division | Apps | Goals | Apps | Goals | Apps | Goals | Apps | Goals | Apps | Goals | Apps | Goals |
|---|---|---|---|---|---|---|---|---|---|---|---|---|---|---|
| Atlético Tucumán | 2012–13 | Primera B Nacional | 0 | 0 | 0 | 0 | — | | — | | 0 | 0 | 0 | 0 |
| Atlético Tucumán | 2013–14 | Primera B Nacional | 1 | 0 | 0 | 0 | — | | — | | 0 | 0 | 1 | 0 |
| Atlético Tucumán | 2014 | Primera B Nacional | 0 | 0 | 0 | 0 | — | | — | | 0 | 0 | 0 | 0 |
| Atlético Tucumán | 2015 | Primera B Nacional | 0 | 0 | 0 | 0 | — | | — | | 0 | 0 | 0 | 0 |
| Atlético Tucumán | 2016 | Primera División | 0 | 0 | 0 | 0 | — | | — | | 0 | 0 | 0 | 0 |
| Atlético Tucumán | 2016–17 | Primera División | 1 | 0 | 0 | 0 | — | | 0 | 0 | 0 | 0 | 1 | 0 |
| Atlético Tucumán | 2017–18 | Primera División | 0 | 0 | 0 | 0 | — | | 3 (Note: Three appearances in 2017 Copa Sudamericana) | 0 | 0 | 0 | 3 | 0 |
| Atlético Tucumán | Total | | 2 | 0 | 0 | 0 | — | | 3 | 0 | 0 | 0 | 5 | 0 |
| San Jorge (loan) | 2014 | Torneo Federal A | 2 | 0 | 1 | 0 | — | | — | | 0 | 0 | 3 | 0 |
| San Jorge (loan) | 2015 | Torneo Federal A | 26 | 0 | 0 | 0 | — | | — | | 0 | 0 | 26 | 0 |
| San Jorge | 2018–19 | Torneo Federal A | 4 | 0 | 0 | 0 | — | | — | | 0 | 0 | 4 | 0 |
| San Jorge | Total | | 32 | 0 | 1 | 0 | — | | — | | 0 | 0 | 33 | 0 |
| Career total | | | 34 | 0 | 1 | 0 | — | | 3 | 0 | 0 | 0 | 38 | 0 |

== Honours ==
Atlético Tucumán

- Primera B Nacional: 2015
