= Franco Pizzicanella =

Argentine footballer

Personal information
- Full name: Franco Pizzicanella
- Date of birth: 29 May 1996 (age 30)
- Place of birth: San Miguel de Tucumán, Argentina
- Height: 1.83 m (6 ft 0 in)
- Position: Goalkeeper

Youth career
- Atlético Tucumán

Senior career*
| Years | Team | Apps | (Gls) |
| 2014–2021 | Atlético Tucumán | 0 | (0) |
- * Club domestic league appearances and goals as of 19:30, 1 October 2018 (UTC)

Franco Pizzicanella (born 29 May 1996) is an Argentine professional footballer who plays as a goalkeeper.

== Career ==
Pizzicanella's career began with Atlético Tucumán. He was first selected in a senior matchday squad in December 2014, when manager Juan Manuel Azconzábal chose him as a substitute for a Primera B Nacional fixture with Santamarina; though he wasn't used. After fourteen further occasions on the subs bench, Pizzicanella eventually made his professional debut during a 2018 Copa Libertadores group stage fixture with Libertad on 17 May; substituted on following a red card to Alejandro Sánchez.

== Career statistics ==
As of 1 October 2018.

Club statistics
| Club | Season | League | | | Cup (Note: Includes the Copa Argentina) | | League Cup | | Continental (Note: Includes the Copa Libertadores and Copa Sudamericana) | | Other | | Total | |
| Club | Season | Division | Apps | Goals | Apps | Goals | Apps | Goals | Apps | Goals | Apps | Goals | Apps | Goals |
|---|---|---|---|---|---|---|---|---|---|---|---|---|---|---|
| Atlético Tucumán | 2014 | Primera B Nacional | 0 | 0 | 0 | 0 | — | | — | | 0 | 0 | 0 | 0 |
| Atlético Tucumán | 2015 | Primera B Nacional | 0 | 0 | 0 | 0 | — | | — | | 0 | 0 | 0 | 0 |
| Atlético Tucumán | 2016 | Primera División | 0 | 0 | 0 | 0 | — | | — | | 0 | 0 | 0 | 0 |
| Atlético Tucumán | 2016–17 | Primera División | 0 | 0 | 0 | 0 | — | | 0 | 0 | 0 | 0 | 0 | 0 |
| Atlético Tucumán | 2017–18 | Primera División | 0 | 0 | 0 | 0 | — | | 1 (Note: One appearance in the 2018 Copa Libertadores) | 0 | 0 | 0 | 1 | 0 |
| Atlético Tucumán | 2018–19 | Primera División | 0 | 0 | 0 | 0 | — | | 0 | 0 | 0 | 0 | 0 | 0 |
| Career total | | | 0 | 0 | 0 | 0 | — | | 1 | 0 | 0 | 0 | 1 | 0 |
