= Iturrieta (surname) =

Iturrieta is a surname of Basque origin. Notable people with the surname include:

- Elías Pino Iturrieta (born 1944), Venezuelan writer and historian
- Gastón Iturrieta (born 1985), Argentine footballer
- Lázaro Iturrieta (1908–?), Argentine rower
