= Mauro Osores =

Argentine footballer

Personal information
- Full name: Mauro Gabriel Osores
- Date of birth: 20 February 1997 (age 29)
- Place of birth: San Pablo, Argentina
- Height: 1.90 m (6 ft 3 in)
- Position: Centre-back

Team information
- Current team: San Martín SJ

Senior career*
Years	Team	Apps	(Gls)
2015–2016	Lastenia	9	(0)
2016–2025	Atlético Tucumán	25	(0)
2019–2020	→ Guillermo Brown (loan)	4	(1)
2022	→ Central Norte (loan)	7	(0)
2022–2023	→ Atlético de Rafaela (loan)	37	(3)
2024	→ Gimnasia Jujuy (loan)	16	(0)
2024	→ CD Marathón (loan)	14	(0)
2025–2026	San Martín Tucumán	13	(0)
2026–	San Martín SJ	4	(0)
- * Club domestic league appearances and goals as of 18:48, 19 March 2026 (UTC)

Mauro Gabriel Osores (born 20 February 1997) is an Argentine professional footballer who plays as a centre-back for San Martín SJ.

== Career ==
Osores started his career with Lastenia in 2015, playing nine times in Torneo Federal B. He then joined Argentine Primera División side Atlético Tucumán in 2016. Osores first appeared in the club's first-team in 2017, making the substitutes bench for a Copa Sudamericana first leg with Oriente Petrolero in Bolivia on 11 July. He made his professional debut in the second leg, playing the full match in a 3–0 win at the Estadio Monumental José Fierro. On 11 November, Osores made his second appearance in a Copa Argentina victory versus Rosario Central. He appeared three more times for them in 2017–18.

In July 2019, Osores headed out on loan to Primera B Nacional with Guillermo Brown. His debut came in August against Barracas Central, with the defender scoring on his next appearance on 4 October versus Estudiantes. He'd appear in two more matches for the club, before returning to his parent club during the COVID-19 pandemic.

In February 2022, Osores moved to Central Norte on a one-year loan deal. However, the loan at Central Norte was terminated and replaced with a loan deal with Atletico de Rafaela instead, as on 10 June 2022, Osores signed a deal with the club until 31 December 2023.Atlético de Rafaela

== Career statistics ==
As of 26 October 2020.

Club statistics
Club	Season	League			Cup		League Cup		Continental		Other		Total	
Club	Season	Division	Apps	Goals	Apps	Goals	Apps	Goals	Apps	Goals	Apps	Goals	Apps	Goals
Lastenia	2015	Torneo Federal B	9	0	0	0	—		—		0	0	9	0
Lastenia	2016	Torneo Federal B	0	0	0	0	—		—		0	0	0	0
Lastenia	Total		9	0	0	0	—		—		0	0	9	0
Atlético Tucumán	2016–17	Primera División	0	0	0	0	—		0	0	0	0	0	0
Atlético Tucumán	2017–18	Primera División	2	0	1	0	—		2 (Note: Appearance(s) in Copa Libertadores and Copa Sudamericana)	0	0	0	5	0
Atlético Tucumán	2018–19	Primera División	0	0	0	0	0	0	—		0	0	0	0
Atlético Tucumán	2019–20	Primera División	0	0	0	0	0	0	0	0	0	0	0	0
Atlético Tucumán	Total		2	0	1	0	0	0	2	0	0	0	5	0
Guillermo Brown (loan)	2019–20	Primera B Nacional	4	1	0	0	—		0	0	0	0	4	1
Career total			15	1	1	0	0	0	2	0	0	0	18	1
