= Mauricio Sanna =

Argentine footballer

Personal information
- Date of birth: 26 October 1996 (age 30)
- Place of birth: San Miguel de Tucumán, Argentina
- Position: Midfielder

Team information
- Current team: Torres

Youth career
- Quilmes
- 2014–2017: Atlético Tucumán

Senior career*
Years	Team	Apps	(Gls)
2017–2018	Atlético Tucumán	1	(0)
2018–2019	Acireale	11	(0)
2019–2020	ASD Lanusei	14	(1)
2020–	Torres	0	(0)
- * Club domestic league appearances and goals as of 16:09, 24 October 2020 (UTC)

Mauricio Sanna (born 26 October 1996) is an Argentine professional footballer who plays as a midfielder for Torres.

== Career ==
Sanna spent time with Quilmes, prior to joining Atlético Tucumán in 2014. His professional debut came on 28 May 2017 versus Talleres. In January 2019, Sanna completed a move to Italian football after agreeing a contract with Serie D side Acireale; he had been training with the club for four previous months. Ahead of the 2019–20 season, Sanna joined another Serie D club in ASD Lanusei. One goal in fourteen matches followed, in a campaign that was curtailed due to the COVID-19 pandemic. In August 2020, Sanna moved across the fourth tier to Torres; a team he scored against with Lanusei.

== Personal life ==
Sanna is of Italian descent; his grandad was born in Thiesi.

== Career statistics ==
As of 24 October 2020.

Club statistics
Club	Season	League			Cup		League Cup		Continental		Other		Total	
Club	Season	Division	Apps	Goals	Apps	Goals	Apps	Goals	Apps	Goals	Apps	Goals	Apps	Goals
Atlético Tucumán	2016–17	Primera División	1	0	0	0	—		0	0	0	0	1	0
Atlético Tucumán	2017–18	Primera División	0	0	0	0	—		0	0	0	0	0	0
Atlético Tucumán	Total		1	0	0	0	—		0	0	0	0	1	0
Acireale	2018–19	Serie D	11	0	0	0	0	0	—		0	0	11	0
ASD Lanusei	2019–20	Serie D	14	1	0	0	0	0	—		0	0	14	1
Torres	2020–21	Serie D	0	0	0	0	0	0	—		0	0	0	0
Career total			26	1	0	0	0	0	0	0	0	0	26	1
