= Gastón Iturrieta =

Argentine footballer (born 1985)

Personal information
- Full name: Gastón Nelson Iturrieta
- Date of birth: 25 May 1985 (age 41)
- Place of birth: Buenos Aires, Argentina
- Position: Midfielder

Youth career
- Nueva Chicago

Senior career*
Years	Team	Apps	(Gls)
2007–2008	Nueva Chicago	0	(0)
2009	Platense		
2010–2012	La Florida	9	(0)
2012–2013	San Martín	1	(0)
2013–2014	San Jorge	16	(1)
2015–2017	Atlético Tucumán	1	(0)
- * Club domestic league appearances and goals as of 01:20, 11 September 2018 (UTC)

Gastón Nelson Iturrieta (born 25 May 1985) is an Argentine professional footballer who plays as a midfielder. He is currently a free agent.

== Career ==
Iturrieta started with Nueva Chicago, before subsequently moving onto Platense, La Florida and San Martín; he made one appearance in Torneo Argentino A for the latter. A move to San Jorge came in 2013, Iturrieta subsequently scored one goal in sixteen appearances for the club in two Torneo Federal A campaigns. Iturrieta joined Primera B Nacional side Atlético Tucumán in 2015 and made his professional debut on 14 November in a league match with Boca Unidos. He departed the club in late-2017.

== Career statistics ==
As of 11 September 2018.

Club statistics
Club	Season	League			Cup (Note: Includes the Copa Argentina)		League Cup		Continental (Note: Includes the Copa Libertadores and Copa Sudamericana)		Other		Total	
Club	Season	Division	Apps	Goals	Apps	Goals	Apps	Goals	Apps	Goals	Apps	Goals	Apps	Goals
Atlético Tucumán	2015	Primera B Nacional	1	0	0	0	—		—		0	0	1	0
Atlético Tucumán	2016	Primera División	0	0	0	0	—		—		0	0	0	0
Atlético Tucumán	2016–17	Primera División	0	0	0	0	—		0	0	0	0	0	0
Atlético Tucumán	2017–18	Primera División	0	0	0	0	—		0	0	0	0	0	0
Career total			1	0	0	0	—		0	0	0	0	1	0

== Honours ==
Atlético Tucumán

- Primera B Nacional: 2015
