= Gonzalo Ontivero =

Argentine footballer

Personal information
- Full name: Gonzalo Ariel Ontivero
- Date of birth: 14 November 1994 (age 31)
- Place of birth: San Miguel de Tucumán, Argentina
- Position: Forward

Team information
- Current team: San Jorge (on loan from Atlético Tucumán)

Youth career
- –2013: Atlético Tucumán

Senior career*
Years	Team	Apps	(Gls)
2013–	Atlético Tucumán	28	(1)
2016	→ Sportivo Patria (loan)	9	(2)
2017–	→ San Jorge (loan)	13	(0)
- * Club domestic league appearances and goals as of 18:35, 30 November 2017 (UTC)

Gonzalo Ariel Ontivero (born 14 November 1994) is an Argentine professional footballer who plays as a forward for Torneo Federal A side San Jorge, on loan from Argentine Primera División side Atlético Tucumán.

== Career ==
Officially debut in a match against Talleres de Cordoba, in his second game (against Union de Santa Fe) saw his first red of his career. In the match against Gymnastics JJY He scored his first goal in his career.
