= Dardo Miloc =

Argentine footballer

Personal information
- Full name: Dardo Federico Miloc
- Date of birth: 16 October 1990 (age 36)
- Place of birth: La Plata, Argentina
- Height: 1.77 m (5 ft 9 1/2 in)
- Position: Defensive midfielder

Team information
- Current team: Barracas Central
- Number: 5

Youth career
- Cambaceres
- 2005–2009: Gimnasia y Esgrima

Senior career*
| Years | Team | Apps | (Gls) |
| 2009–2017 | Gimnasia y Esgrima | 66 | (1) |
| 2015–2016 | → Sarmiento (loan) | 34 | (0) |
| 2017 | → Temperley (loan) | 7 | (0) |
| 2017–2018 | Atlético Tucumán | 2 | (0) |
| 2018–2019 | Aldosivi | 14 | (0) |
| 2019–2021 | Patronato | 21 | (0) |
| 2021 | Volos | 1 | (0) |
| 2021–2023 | Arsenal de Sarandí | 58 | (0) |
| 2023–2024 | Alajuelense | 21 | (0) |
| 2024 | Central Córdoba SdE | 18 | (1) |
| 2024– | Barracas Central | 64 | (0) |
- * Club domestic league appearances and goals as of 16:57, 3 June 2026 (UTC)

Dardo Federico Miloc (born 16 October 1990) is an Argentine professional footballer who plays as a defensive midfielder for Barracas Central.

== Career ==
Miloc had youth spells with Cambaceres and Gimnasia y Esgrima. It was with the latter that he made his professional debut with, it came on 5 July 2009 in an Argentine Primera División victory against Gimnasia y Esgrima (J). Ten further appearances followed in his first three seasons with Gimnasia, two of those came in the club's relegation season of 2010–11. In his twentieth match in Primera B Nacional, Miloc scored his first senior goal in a 3–0 win versus Sarmiento. Upon returning to the Primera División, Miloc played in thirty-eight games for Gimnasia. In January 2015, Miloc joined fellow top-flight team Sarmiento on loan.

He returned in June 2016 following thirty-five appearances. A year later, Miloc signed for Temperley on loan. He played eight times for them in 2016–17. On 13 August 2017, Miloc left Gimnasia permanently to join Atlético Tucumán. He made his Tucumán debut in the Copa Sudamericana against Independiente on 22 August. Miloc made a move to newly promoted Primera División team Aldosivi on 19 June 2018. After eighteen games in 2018–19, Miloc spent the next two seasons with Patronato. He was sent off in back-to-back appearances across November and December 2019; versus Central Córdoba and Vélez Sarsfield respectively.

On 1 February 2021, Miloc headed abroad as he agreed terms with Super League Greece side Volos.

== Career statistics ==
As of 3 February 2021.

Club statistics
| Club | Season | League | | | Cup | | League Cup | | Continental | | Other | | Total | |
| Club | Season | Division | Apps | Goals | Apps | Goals | Apps | Goals | Apps | Goals | Apps | Goals | Apps | Goals |
|---|---|---|---|---|---|---|---|---|---|---|---|---|---|---|
| Gimnasia y Esgrima | 2008–09 | Primera División | 1 | 0 | 0 | 0 | — | | — | | 0 | 0 | 1 | 0 |
| Gimnasia y Esgrima | 2009–10 | Primera División | 1 | 0 | 0 | 0 | — | | — | | 0 | 0 | 1 | 0 |
| Gimnasia y Esgrima | 2010–11 | Primera División | 2 | 0 | 0 | 0 | — | | — | | 0 | 0 | 2 | 0 |
| Gimnasia y Esgrima | 2011–12 | Primera B Nacional | 7 | 0 | 1 | 0 | — | | — | | 0 | 0 | 8 | 0 |
| Gimnasia y Esgrima | 2012–13 | Primera B Nacional | 13 | 1 | 1 | 0 | — | | — | | 0 | 0 | 14 | 1 |
| Gimnasia y Esgrima | 2013–14 | Primera División | 22 | 0 | 0 | 0 | — | | — | | 0 | 0 | 22 | 0 |
| Gimnasia y Esgrima | 2014 | Primera División | 16 | 0 | 0 | 0 | — | | 1 (Note: Appearance(s) in the Copa Sudamericana) | 0 | 0 | 0 | 17 | 0 |
| Gimnasia y Esgrima | 2015 | Primera División | 0 | 0 | 0 | 0 | — | | — | | 0 | 0 | 0 | 0 |
| Gimnasia y Esgrima | 2016 | Primera División | 0 | 0 | 0 | 0 | — | | — | | 0 | 0 | 0 | 0 |
| Gimnasia y Esgrima | 2016–17 | Primera División | 4 | 0 | 2 | 0 | — | | 0 | 0 | 0 | 0 | 6 | 0 |
| Gimnasia y Esgrima | Total | | 66 | 1 | 4 | 0 | — | | 1 | 0 | 0 | 0 | 71 | 1 |
| Sarmiento (loan) | 2015 | Primera División | 26 | 0 | 1 | 0 | — | | — | | 0 | 0 | 27 | 0 |
| Sarmiento (loan) | 2016 | Primera División | 8 | 0 | 0 | 0 | — | | — | | 0 | 0 | 8 | 0 |
| Sarmiento (loan) | Total | | 34 | 0 | 1 | 0 | — | | — | | 0 | 0 | 35 | 0 |
| Temperley (loan) | 2016–17 | Primera División | 7 | 0 | 1 | 0 | — | | — | | 0 | 0 | 8 | 0 |
| Atlético Tucumán | 2017–18 | Primera División | 2 | 0 | 3 | 0 | — | | 2 | 0 | 0 | 0 | 7 | 0 |
| Aldosivi | 2018–19 | Primera División | 14 | 0 | 0 | 0 | 4 | 0 | — | | 0 | 0 | 18 | 0 |
| Patronato | 2019–20 | Primera División | 15 | 0 | 1 | 0 | 0 | 0 | — | | 0 | 0 | 16 | 0 |
| Patronato | 2020–21 | Primera División | 6 | 0 | 0 | 0 | 0 | 0 | — | | 0 | 0 | 6 | 0 |
| Patronato | Total | | 21 | 0 | 1 | 0 | 0 | 0 | — | | 0 | 0 | 22 | 0 |
| Volos | 2020–21 | Super League | 0 | 0 | 0 | 0 | — | | — | | 0 | 0 | 0 | 0 |
| Career total | | | 144 | 1 | 10 | 0 | 4 | 0 | 3 | 0 | 0 | 0 | 161 | 1 |
