= Nery Leyes =

Argentine footballer

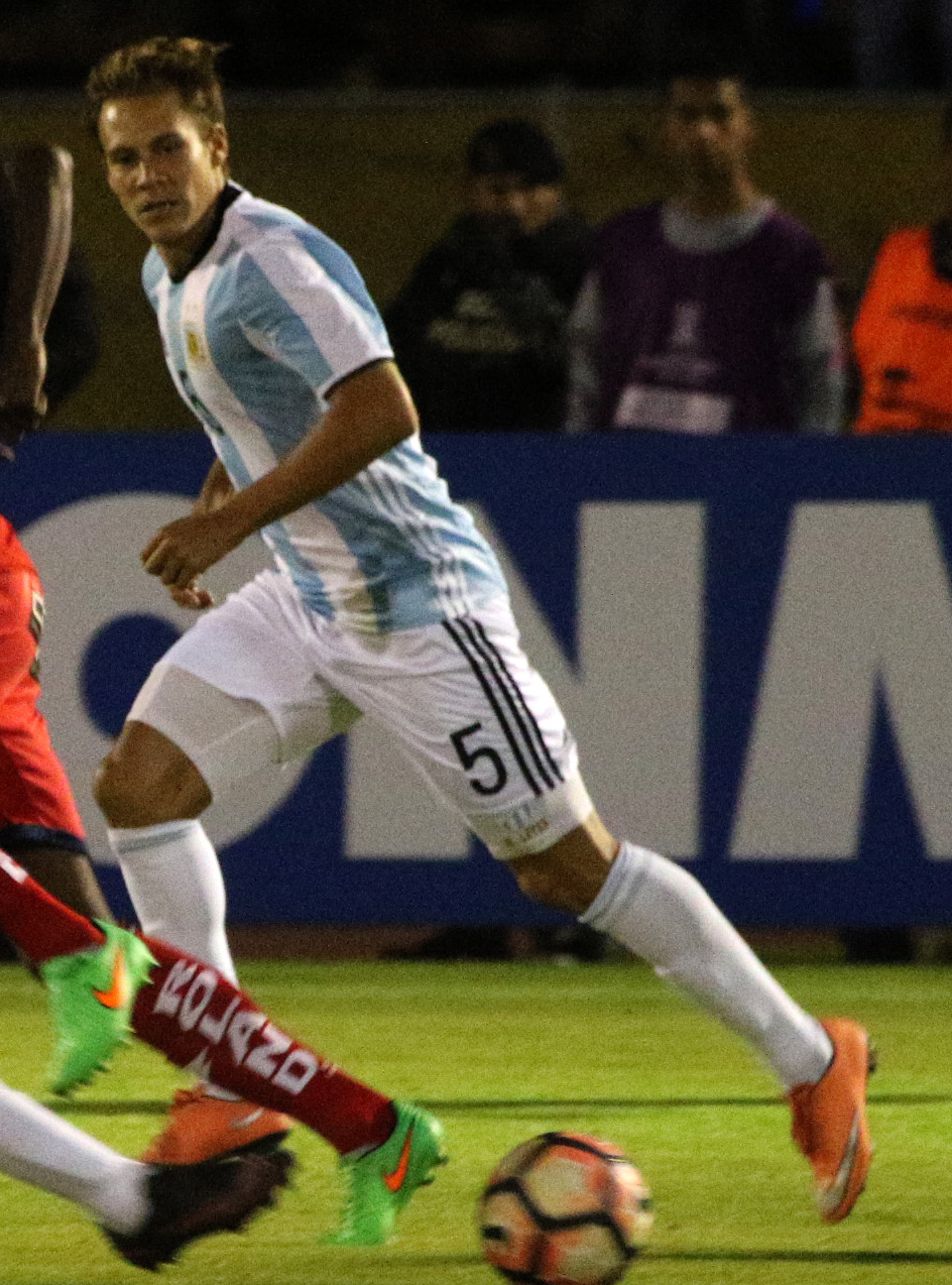

Personal information
- Full name: Nery Francisco Leyes
- Date of birth: 5 September 1989 (age 37)
- Place of birth: Ushuaia, Argentine
- Height: 1.81 m (5 ft 11 1/2 in)
- Position: Midfielder

Team information
- Current team: Estudiantes RC

Senior career*
Years	Team	Apps	(Gls)
2010–2014	Talleres de Córdoba	61	(3)
2014–2015	Defensa y Justicia	31	(0)
2016–2021	Tucumán	62	(0)
2017–2018	→ Newell's Old Boys (loan)	9	(0)
2018–2019	→ Deportes Antofagasta (loan)	9	(0)
2020	→ Banfield (loan)	7	(0)
2020–2021	→ Unión (loan)	5	(0)
2021–2022	Gimnasia LP	17	(0)
2023–	Estudiantes RC	23	(0)
- * Club domestic league appearances and goals as of 18:53, 23 August 2023 (UTC)

Nery Francisco Leyes (born 5 September 1989) is an Argentine footballer who plays for Estudiantes de Río Cuarto as a midfielder.
