= Gastón Cuevas =

Argentine footballer

Personal information
- Full name: Gastón Emiliano Cuevas
- Date of birth: 21 February 1993 (age 33)
- Place of birth: Termas de Río Hondo, Argentina
- Position: Midfielder

Youth career
- 2009–2010: Herrera del Alto
- 2010: Atlético Termas
- 2010–2013: Atlético Tucumán

Senior career*
| Years | Team | Apps | (Gls) |
| 2013–2017 | Atlético Tucumán | 11 | (0) |
| 2017 | Sportivo Italiano | 2 | (0) |
| 2019 | Atlético Concepción | 11 | (1) |
- * Club domestic league appearances and goals

Gastón Emiliano Cuevas (born 21 February 1993) is an Argentine football player who plays as a midfielder.

== Career ==
Cuevas spent time in the youth ranks of Herrera del Alto, Atlético Termas and Atlético Tucumán. He made his professional debut for the latter in June 2013, playing twenty-two minutes in a Primera B Nacional defeat to Douglas Haig. He had previously been an unused substitute in matches against Instituto and Almirante Brown. Cuevas made one appearance in 2012–13, before making eleven over the course of 2013–14 and 2014. On 23 August 2017, Cuevas joined Sportivo Italiano of Primera C Metropolitana. However, he left three months later after only two games. Tier four Atlético Concepción signed Cuevas in 2019.

== Career statistics ==
As of 30 August 2020.

Club statistics
| Club | Season | League | | | Cup | | Continental | | Other | | Total | |
| Club | Season | Division | Apps | Goals | Apps | Goals | Apps | Goals | Apps | Goals | Apps | Goals |
|---|---|---|---|---|---|---|---|---|---|---|---|---|
| Atlético Tucumán | 2012–13 | Primera B Nacional | 1 | 0 | 0 | 0 | — | | 0 | 0 | 1 | 0 |
| Atlético Tucumán | 2013–14 | Primera B Nacional | 7 | 0 | 1 | 0 | — | | 0 | 0 | 8 | 0 |
| Atlético Tucumán | 2014 | Primera B Nacional | 3 | 0 | 0 | 0 | — | | 0 | 0 | 3 | 0 |
| Atlético Tucumán | 2015 | Primera B Nacional | 0 | 0 | 0 | 0 | — | | 0 | 0 | 0 | 0 |
| Atlético Tucumán | 2016 | Primera División | 0 | 0 | 0 | 0 | — | | 0 | 0 | 0 | 0 |
| Atlético Tucumán | 2016–17 | Primera División | 0 | 0 | 0 | 0 | 0 | 0 | 0 | 0 | 0 | 0 |
| Atlético Tucumán | Total | | 11 | 0 | 1 | 0 | 0 | 0 | 0 | 0 | 12 | 0 |
| Sportivo Italiano | 2017–18 | Primera C Metropolitana | 2 | 0 | 0 | 0 | — | | 0 | 0 | 2 | 0 |
| Atlético Concepción | 2019 | Torneo Regional Federal Amateur | 6 | 1 | 0 | 0 | — | | 0 | 0 | 6 | 1 |
| Career total | | | 19 | 1 | 1 | 0 | 0 | 0 | 0 | 0 | 20 | 1 |
