= Guillermo Acosta =

Argentine footballer

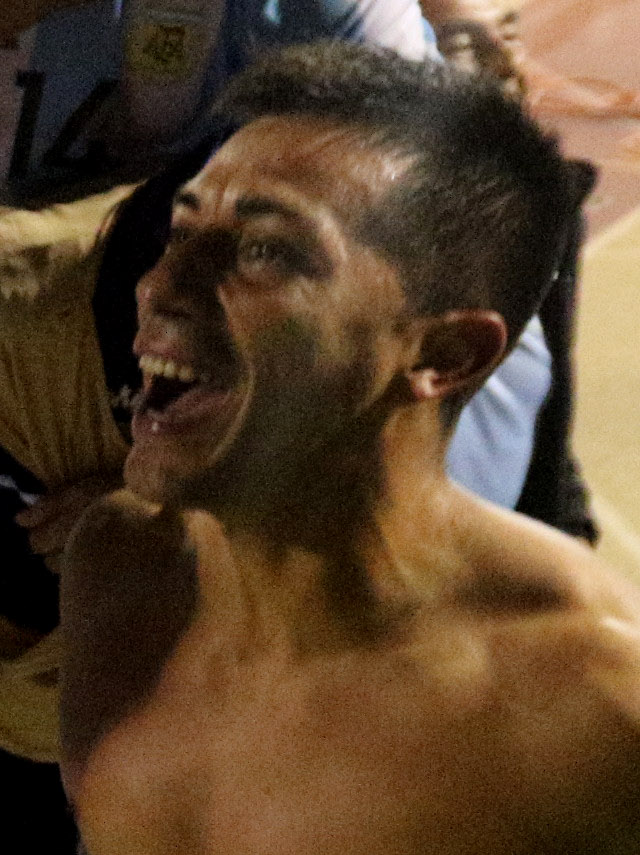
- Acosta in 2017

Personal information
- Full name: Guillermo Gastón Acosta
- Date of birth: 31 October 1988 (age 38)
- Place of birth: Alderetes, Argentina
- Height: 1.80 m (5 ft 11 in)
- Position: Winger

Team information
- Current team: San Martín SJ

Senior career*
Years	Team	Apps	(Gls)
2007	Juventud Unida	1	(0)
2008	Atlético Concepción	0	(0)
2008–2009	La Florida	24	(5)
2009–2010	Atlético Concepción	13	(1)
2010–2011	San Jorge Tucumán	0	(0)
2011	Mitre de Salta	0	(0)
2011–2013	San Jorge Tucumán	71	(21)
2013–2019	Atlético Tucumán	148	(23)
2019	Lanús	5	(1)
2019–2026	Atlético Tucumán	194	(6)
2026–	San Martín SJ	3	(0)
- * Club domestic league appearances and goals as of 18:02, 11 March 2026 (UTC)

Guillermo Gastón Acosta (born 31 October 1988) is an Argentine footballer who plays right winger, midfielder or right midfielder for San Martín SJ.
