= Francisco Grahl =

Argentine footballer

Personal information
- Full name: Francisco Guillermo Grahl
- Date of birth: 5 March 1992 (age 34)
- Place of birth: San Justo, Argentina
- Height: 1.70 m (5 ft 7 in)
- Position: Midfielder

Team information
- Current team: Almirante Brown

Youth career
- Manuel Belgrano
- Unión de Belgrano
- 2003–2008: Almirante Brown

Senior career*
Years	Team	Apps	(Gls)
2008–2011	Almirante Brown	6	(0)
2010–2011	→ Boca Juniors (loan)	0	(0)
2011–2013	Boca Juniors	0	(0)
2013–2014	Almirante Brown	32	(6)
2014–2018	Atlético Tucumán	54	(2)
2016–2017	→ Almagro (loan)	38	(3)
2018–2019	San Martín SJ	11	(1)
2019–2021	Aldosivi	50	(5)
2022	Central Córdoba SdE	15	(0)
2023	San Martín SJ	29	(4)
2024	Sport Boys	16	(1)
2025	Real Estelí	15	(3)
2025–	Almirante Brown	0	(0)
- * Club domestic league appearances and goals as of 18:34, 29 June 2025 (UTC)

Francisco Guillermo Grahl (born 5 March 1992) is an Argentine professional footballer who plays as a midfielder for Almirante Brown.

== Career ==
After spells in the youth of Manuel Belgrano, Unión de Belgrano and Almirante Brown, Grahl started his senior career with the latter in 2008. He played six times between 2008 and 2010. In July 2010, Grahl joined Argentine Primera División side Boca Juniors on loan. His loan was made permanent in 2011. Grahl left Boca without featuring in 2013 and returned to Almirante Brown. He scored the first professional goal of his career for the club on 8 December 2013 in a Primera B Nacional draw with Huracán. In the 2013–14 season, Grahl made thirty-two appearances for Almirante Brown and scored six goals.

In July 2014, Grahl joined Atlético Tucumán of Primera B Nacional. He scored his opening Tucumán goal in his second appearance in an away win versus Unión Santa Fe. He played twenty times in his debut campaign, prior to participating in eighteen games in Tucumán's title-winning run of 2015. He failed to make an appearance in the 2016 Argentine Primera División and was subsequently sent out on loan to Almagro for the 2016–17 season. He played thirty-eight matches and scored three for Almagro. San Martín signed Grahl in July 2018. His league debut was also his 100th career appearance; vs. Belgrano on 11 August.

== Career statistics ==
As of 11 September 2018.

Club statistics
Club	Season	League			Cup (Note: Includes the Copa Argentina)		League Cup		Continental (Note: Includes the Copa Libertadores and Copa Sudamericana)		Other		Total	
Club	Season	Division	Apps	Goals	Apps	Goals	Apps	Goals	Apps	Goals	Apps	Goals	Apps	Goals
Atlético Tucumán	2014	Primera B Nacional	20	1	0	0	—		—		0	0	20	1
Atlético Tucumán	2015	Primera B Nacional	18	1	0	0	—		—		0	0	18	1
Atlético Tucumán	2016	Primera División	0	0	0	0	—		—		0	0	0	0
Atlético Tucumán	2016–17	Primera División	0	0	0	0	—		0	0	0	0	0	0
Atlético Tucumán	2017–18	Primera División	16	0	2	0	—		2 (Note: Two appearances in 2018 Copa Libertadores)	0	0	0	20	0
Atlético Tucumán	Total		54	2	2	0	—		2	0	0	0	58	2
Almagro (loan)	2016–17	Primera B Nacional	38	3	2	0	—		—		0	0	40	3
San Martín	2018–19	Primera División	1	0	1	0	—		—		0	0	2	0
Career total			93	5	5	0	—		2	0	0	0	100	5

== Honours ==
Almirante Brown

- Primera B Metropolitana: 2009–10

Atlético Tucumán

- Primera B Nacional: 2015
