= Alejandro Melo =

Argentine footballer

Personal information
- Full name: Eduardo Alejandro Melo
- Date of birth: 11 January 1996 (age 30)
- Place of birth: San Justo, Argentina
- Height: 1.80 m (5 ft 11 in)
- Position: Attacking midfielder

Team information
- Current team: Estudiantes BA

Senior career*
Years	Team	Apps	(Gls)
2013–2014	Nueva Chicago	35	(4)
2014–2019	San Lorenzo	0	(0)
2015	→ Sarmiento (loan)	3	(0)
2016–2017	→ Nueva Chicago (loan)	56	(12)
2017–2018	→ Atlético Tucumán (loan)	15	(1)
2018–2019	→ Gimnasia LP (loan)	1	(0)
2019	→ Nueva Chicago (loan)	12	(5)
2019–2021	Coquimbo Unido	1	(0)
2020–2021	→ Nueva Chicago (loan)	23	(1)
2021–2026	Agropecuario	137	(19)
2026–	Estudiantes BA	6	(0)
- * Club domestic league appearances and goals as of 16:15, 28 April 2026 (UTC)

Eduardo Alejandro Melo (born 11 January 1996), usually known as Alejandro Melo, is an Argentine professional footballer who plays as an attacking midfielder for Estudiantes BA.

== Career ==
Melo started his career in 2013 with Nueva Chicago, appearing on the club's substitutes bench for their final Primera B Nacional fixture of 2012–13 against Ferro Carril Oeste. He made his professional debut in the following season in Primera B Metropolitana, playing eighty-three minutes in a 1–1 draw with Atlanta on 4 August. Melo scored the first goal of his career in February 2014 versus Deportivo Armenio. He scored two further goals in twenty-six overall appearances as Nueva Chicago won the 2013–14 title. He scored in his first Primera B Nacional game, in a 3–1 win over Guaraní Antonio Franco on 16 August.

He made nine appearances in the second tier in 2014, prior to joining Argentine Primera División side San Lorenzo in December. In February 2015, Melo joined fellow Primera División team Sarmiento on loan. His top-flight debut came in a goalless draw with Gimnasia y Esgrima on 11 May. He returned to San Lorenzo after just four games for Sarmiento. January 2016 saw Melo rejoin Nueva Chicago on a loan deal. He played a total of fifty-six matches and scored twelve goals across the 2016 and 2016–17 seasons. On 3 July 2017, Melo joined Atlético Tucumán for his third loan away from San Lorenzo.

He made his Atlético Tucumán debut in October in the Copa Argentina against former club Sarmiento, scoring the fourth goal in a 4–0 victory. Melo achieved his 100th career league appearance on 4 December versus Colón. On 25 July 2018, Gimnasia y Esgrima completed the loan signing of Melo. Four days later, he made his first appearance as his new club eliminated Olimpo from the Copa Argentina on 29 July. Only one more match followed, versus Talleres in the Primera División, before he terminated his loan in January 2019. Melo then penned a six-month loan with ex-team Nueva Chicago.

After five goals in fourteen fixtures for Nueva Chicago, as they reached the play-offs, Melo departed in June 2019. In July, having ended his San Lorenzo contract, Melo signed for Coquimbo Unido of the Chilean Primera División. He made his debut on 17 August versus Curicó Unido, coming on for the final fifteen minutes of the match that would be his only one for the club. January 2020 saw Melo rejoin Nueva Chicago on loan for a fourth stint.

== Career statistics ==
As of 26 June 2020.

Club statistics
Club	Season	League			Cup		League Cup		Continental		Other		Total	
Club	Season	Division	Apps	Goals	Apps	Goals	Apps	Goals	Apps	Goals	Apps	Goals	Apps	Goals
Nueva Chicago	2012–13	Primera B Nacional	0	0	0	0	—		—		0	0	0	0
Nueva Chicago	2013–14	Primera B Metropolitana	26	3	0	0	—		—		0	0	26	3
Nueva Chicago	2014	Primera B Nacional	9	1	0	0	—		—		0	0	9	1
Nueva Chicago	Total		35	4	0	0	—		—		0	0	35	4
San Lorenzo	2015	Argentine Primera División	0	0	0	0	—		0	0	0	0	0	0
San Lorenzo	2016	Argentine Primera División	0	0	0	0	—		0	0	0	0	0	0
San Lorenzo	2016–17	Argentine Primera División	0	0	0	0	—		0	0	0	0	0	0
San Lorenzo	2017–18	Argentine Primera División	0	0	0	0	—		0	0	0	0	0	0
San Lorenzo	2018–19	Argentine Primera División	0	0	0	0	0	0	0	0	0	0	0	0
San Lorenzo	Total		0	0	0	0	0	0	0	0	0	0	0	0
Sarmiento (loan)	2015	Argentine Primera División	3	0	1	0	—		—		0	0	4	0
Nueva Chicago (loan)	2016	Primera B Nacional	18	2	0	0	—		—		0	0	18	2
Nueva Chicago (loan)	2016–17	Primera B Nacional	38	10	2	0	—		—		0	0	40	10
Nueva Chicago (loan)	Total		56	12	2	0	—		—		0	0	58	12
Atlético Tucumán (loan)	2017–18	Argentine Primera División	15	1	3	1	—		7 (Note: Appearance(s) in the Copa Libertadores and Copa Sudamericana)	0	0	0	25	2
Gimnasia y Esgrima (loan)	2018–19	Argentine Primera División	1	0	1	0	—		0	0	0	0	2	0
Nueva Chicago (loan)	2018–19	Primera B Nacional	12	5	0	0	—		—		2 (Note: Appearance(s) in Primera B Nacional play-offs)	0	14	5
Coquimbo Unido	2019	Chilean Primera División	1	0	0	0	—		—		0	0	1	0
Coquimbo Unido	2020	Chilean Primera División	0	0	0	0	—		0	0	0	0	0	0
Coquimbo Unido	Total		1	0	—		—		0	0	0	0	1	0
Nueva Chicago (loan)	2019–20	Primera B Nacional	6	0	0	0	—		—		0	0	6	0
Career total			129	22	7	1	0	0	7	0	2	0	145	23

== Honours ==
Nueva Chicago

- Primera B Metropolitana: 2013–14
