= Favio Álvarez =

Argentine footballer

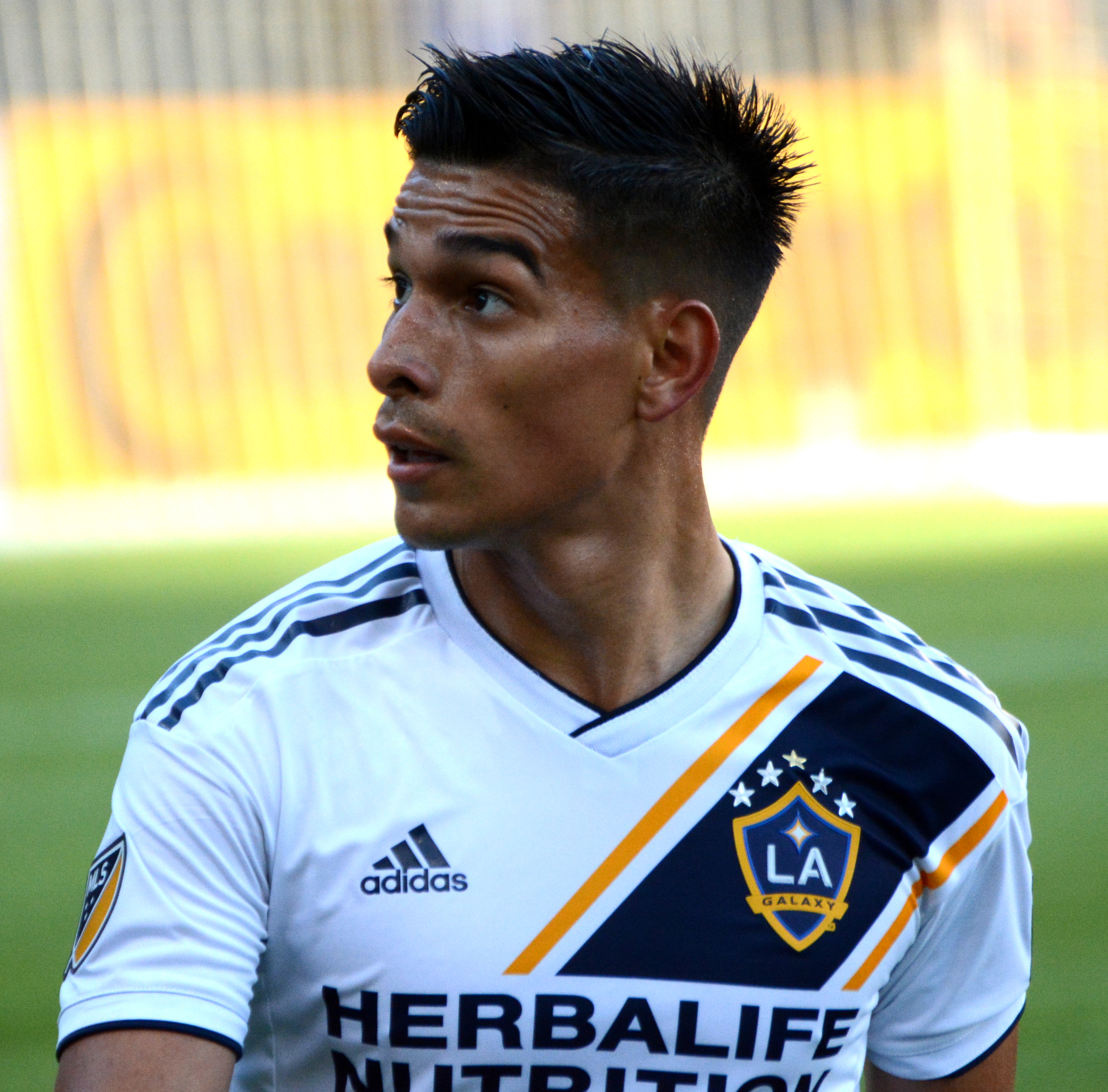
- Álvarez with LA Galaxy in 2019

Personal information
- Full name: Favio Enrique Álvarez
- Date of birth: 23 January 1993 (age 33)
- Place of birth: Córdoba, Argentina
- Height: 1.84 m (6 ft 1/2 in)
- Position: Attacking midfielder

Team information
- Current team: Banfield
- Number: 11

Senior career*
Years	Team	Apps	(Gls)
2010–2015	Talleres	88	(10)
2015	Defensa y Justicia	16	(2)
2016	Sarmiento	9	(0)
2016–2020	Atlético Tucumán	45	(5)
2019	→ LA Galaxy (loan)	18	(3)
2020	→ Pumas UNAM (loan)	24	(3)
2021–2022	Pumas UNAM	50	(7)
2022–2023	Talleres	15	(0)
2023–2024	Colón	15	(0)
2024–2025	Lanús	17	(1)
2025	The Strongest	0	(0)
2026–	Banfield	8	(0)
- * Club domestic league appearances and goals as of 17:52, 8 November 2026 (UTC)

Favio Enrique Álvarez (born 23 January 1993) is an Argentine professional footballer who plays as an attacking midfielder for Banfield.

== Career ==
Álvarez began with Torneo Argentino A team Talleres in 2010, he remained there for five years and made eighty-eight appearances before joining Primera División club Defensa y Justicia in 2015. He made his bow on 14 February against Gimnasia y Esgrima. In January 2016, Álvarez signed for Sarmiento and went onto make nine appearances during the 2016 Primera División season. On 29 August, Álvarez completed a move to Atlético Tucumán. On 7 May 2019, Álvarez joined Major League Soccer side LA Galaxy on loan. His debut came in a loss to Colorado Rapids on 19 May, followed soon by his first goal versus Sporting Kansas City.

== Career statistics ==
As of 11 November 2019.

Club statistics
Club	Season	League			Cup		League Cup		Continental		Other		Total	
Club	Season	Division	Apps	Goals	Apps	Goals	Apps	Goals	Apps	Goals	Apps	Goals	Apps	Goals
Atlético Tucumán	2016–17	Primera División	11	2	0	0	—		5 (Note: Appearance(s) in the Copa Libertadores)	0	0	0	16	2
Atlético Tucumán	2017–18	Primera División	20	1	5	1	—		6 (Note: Appearance(s) in the Copa Libertadores and Copa Sudamericana)	0	0	0	31	2
Atlético Tucumán	2018–19	Primera División	14	2	1	0	1	0	0	0	0	0	16	2
Atlético Tucumán	Total		45	5	6	1	1	0	11	0	0	0	63	6
LA Galaxy (loan)	2019	MLS	18	3	1	0	—		—		1 (Note: Appearance(s) in the Leagues Cup)	0	20	3
Career total			63	8	7	1	1	0	11	0	1	0	83	9

== Honours ==
Talleres

- Torneo Argentino A: 2012–13
