= Matías Ballini =

Argentine footballer

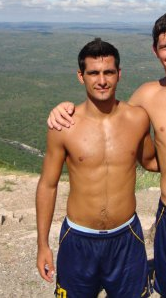
- Matías Ballini in 2010.

Personal information
- Full name: Matías Nicolás Leonel Ballini
- Date of birth: 19 December 1988 (age 37)
- Place of birth: Campana, Argentina
- Height: 1.73 m (5 ft 8 in)
- Position: Midfielder

Team information
- Current team: Deportivo Morón

Senior career*
Years	Team	Apps	(Gls)
2004–2007	Villa Dálmine	47	(1)
2007–2014	Rosario Central	50	(1)
2012	→ Girona (loan)	7	(0)
2012–2013	→ Atlético Tucumán (loan)	32	(2)
2014–2016	Colón	36	(0)
2016–2018	Atlético Tucumán	8	(1)
2018–2020	Villa Dálmine	32	(3)
2020–2021	Santa Fe	3	(0)
2021	San Martín Tucumán	24	(2)
2022–2023	Cobreloa	56	(7)
2024	Curicó Unido	11	(1)
2025–	Deportivo Morón	7	(0)
- * Club domestic league appearances and goals as of 17:05, 4 August 2025 (UTC)

Matías Nicolás Leonel Ballini (born 19 December 1988) is an Argentine professional footballer who plays as a midfielder for Deportivo Morón.

== Career ==
In 2013, Ballini played for Rosario Central.

In 2022, he moved to Chile and joined Cobreloa until December 2023.
