= Hernán Hechalar =

Argentine footballer

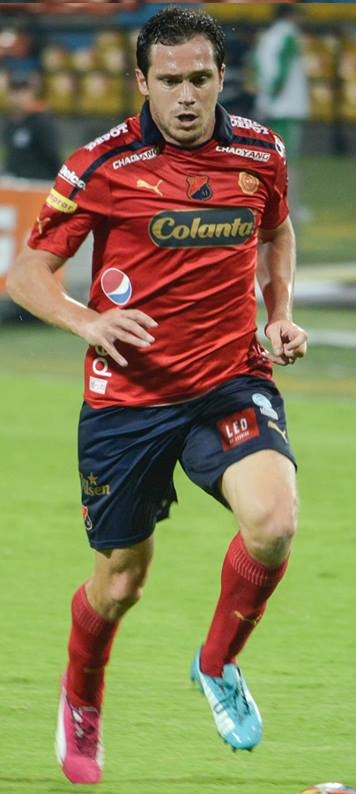
- Hernán Hechalar jugando en el D. Independiente Medellin, 2015

Personal information
- Full name: Hernán Ignacio Hechalar
- Date of birth: 12 August 1988 (age 38)
- Place of birth: Córdoba, Argentina
- Height: 1.73 m (5 ft 8 in)
- Position: Forward

Team information
- Current team: Juventud Antoniana

Youth career
- Belgrano

Senior career*
Years	Team	Apps	(Gls)
2008–2010	Belgrano	3	(0)
2009	→ Juventud Antoniana (loan)		
2009–2010	→ Guaraní (loan)	4	(0)
2010–2012	Juventud Antoniana		
2012–2014	Unión Mar del Plata	34	(8)
2014	Atlético Huila	38	(13)
2014–2019	Independiente Medellín	101	(20)
2017–2018	→ Atlético Tucumán (loan)	10	(1)
2018	→ Delfín (loan)	13	(1)
2019	→ Atlético Huila (loan)	16	(3)
2019	Gimnasia Jujuy	5	(0)
2020	Cobreloa	10	(0)
2020–	Juventud Antoniana	22	(4)
- * Club domestic league appearances and goals as of 25 November 2020

Hernán Ignacio Hechalar (born 12 August 1988) is an Argentine professional footballer who plays as a forward for Juventud Antoniana.

== Career ==
Belgrano were Hechalar's first senior team, he made three appearances for the first-team after time in the youth system. His debut Belgrano appearance was on 7 August 2008 versus Unión Santa Fe, his second came over a month later against future club Atlético Tucumán. In 2009, Hechalar was loaned out twice, firstly to Juventud Antoniana of Torneo Argentino A and then to Guaraní of the Paraguayan Primera División. A year later, in July 2010, Hechalar rejoined Juventud Antoniana on a permanent contract. Over his two spells with the club, Hechalar scored twelve goals in seventy-four matches in the third tier.

On 8 July 2012, Hechalar joined fellow Torneo Argentino A team Unión Mar del Plata. He scored on his Unión debut, netting a late consolation goal in a 2–1 defeat to Alvarado. Seven more goals and twenty-three more games followed in his first season. Hechalar departed Argentine football in 2014 to sign for Categoría Primera A side Atlético Huila in Colombia. He went onto score thirteen goals in thirty-eight matches. After just one season with Atlético Huila, Hechalar left and joined Independiente Medellín twelve months after arriving; one hundred and thirty-two appearances and twenty-nine goals followed.

On 23 August 2017, Hechalar joined Argentine Primera División side Atlético Tucumán on loan. One year following, Delfín of the Ecuadorian Serie A loaned Hechalar. Having netted once in thirteen encounters across the 2018 campaign, Hechalar resigned with Atlético Huila in January 2019; signing a loan deal.

== Career statistics ==
As of 11 January 2019.

Club statistics
Club	Season	League			Cup		Continental		Other		Total	
Club	Season	Division	Apps	Goals	Apps	Goals	Apps	Goals	Apps	Goals	Apps	Goals
Independiente Medellín	2015	Categoría Primera A	31	9	8	4	0	0	10 (Note: Appearance(s) in the Categoría Primera A play-offs)	3	49	16
Independiente Medellín	2016	Categoría Primera A	34	5	7	4	7 (Note: Appearance(s) in the Copa Sudamericana)	1	6	1	54	11
Independiente Medellín	2017	Categoría Primera A	19	2	1	0	6 (Note: Appearance(s) in the Copa Libertadores and Copa Sudamericana)	0	3 (Note: Appearance(s) in the Categoría Primera A play-offs and Superliga Colombiana)	0	29	2
Independiente Medellín	2018	Categoría Primera A	0	0	0	0	0	0	0	0	0	0
Independiente Medellín	2019	Categoría Primera A	0	0	0	0	0	0	0	0	0	0
Independiente Medellín	Total		84	16	16	8	13	1	19	4	132	29
Atlético Tucumán (loan)	2017–18	Primera División	10	1	2	1	1 (Note: Appearance(s) in the Copa Libertadores)	0	0	0	13	2
Delfín (loan)	2018	Serie A	13	1	—		—		0	0	13	1
Atlético Huila (loan)	2019	Categoría Primera A	0	0	0	0	—		0	0	0	0
Career total			107	18	18	9	14	1	19	4	158	32

== Honours ==
Independiente Medellín

- Categoría Primera A: 2016 Apertura
