= Nahuel Zárate =

Argentine footballer

Personal information
- Full name: Nahuel Alejandro Zárate
- Date of birth: 27 January 1993 (age 33)
- Place of birth: Buenos Aires, Argentina
- Height: 1.72 m (5 ft 7 1/2 in)
- Position: Left-back

Team information
- Current team: Estudiantes BA

Youth career
- Boca Juniors

Senior career*
Years	Team	Apps	(Gls)
2013–2016	Boca Juniors	30	(0)
2015–2016	→ Godoy Cruz (loan)	23	(0)
2016–2017	Unión de Santa Fe	20	(0)
2017–2018	Atlético Tucumán	8	(0)
2019	Fénix de Pilar	8	(0)
2019–2020	Gimnasia Jujuy	6	(0)
2020–2021	Güemes	36	(2)
2022–	Estudiantes BA	17	(0)
- * Club domestic league appearances and goals as of 17:09, 17 July 2022 (UTC)

Nahuel Zárate (born 27 January 1993) is an Argentine footballer who plays for Estudiantes de Buenos Aires. He is left-footed, and his position was left back. He was sentenced to five years in prison for involuntary manslaughter, after crashing and killing two men.
