= Yonathan Cabral =

Argentine professional footballer

Personal information
- Full name: Yonathan Emanuel Cabral
- Date of birth: 10 May 1992 (age 34)
- Place of birth: Isidro Casanova, Argentina
- Height: 1.88 m (6 ft 2 in)
- Position: Centre-back

Team information
- Current team: San Antonio Bulo Bulo
- Number: 3

Youth career
- –2014: Racing Club

Senior career*
Years	Team	Apps	(Gls)
2014–2019	Racing Club	44	(1)
2016–2017	→ Olimpo (loan)	18	(2)
2017–2019	→ Atlético Tucumán (loan)	45	(2)
2019–2026	Atlético Tucumán	54	(1)
2021	→ Newell's Old Boys (loan)	11	(0)
2022	→ Lanús (loan)	23	(1)
2023–2024	→ Gimnasia La Plata (loan)	48	(2)
2025	→ Aldosivi (loan)	22	(0)
2026–	San Antonio Bulo Bulo	0	(0)
- * Club domestic league appearances and goals as of 18:06, 9 March 2026 (UTC)

Yonathan Emanuel Cabral (born 10 May 1992) is an Argentine professional footballer who plays as a centre-back for Bolivian club San Antonio Bulo Bulo.

== Career ==
Yonathan came in lower than Racing Club. Was concentrated first when club coach, Reinaldo Merlo had no variants to replace the defender holder . Made his professional debut on 22 March 2014, in the win 2–0 on Belgrano de Córdoba. On 14 December of that year is devoted champion with Racing after 13 years. The 2 May 2015 marks his first professional goal against Lanus.

== Honours ==
Racing Club

- Argentine Primera División (1): 2014
