= Nicolás Romat =

Argentine footballer

Personal information
- Date of birth: 6 May 1988 (age 38)
- Place of birth: Azul, Argentina
- Height: 1.81 m (5 ft 11 in)
- Position: Right-back

Team information
- Current team: Universitario de Sucre
- Number: 44

Youth career
- Quilmes

Senior career*
Years	Team	Apps	(Gls)
2010	Quilmes	1	(0)
2010–2011	Central Norte	36	(4)
2011–2012	Talleres	28	(1)
2012–2013	Crucero del Norte	24	(2)
2013–2016	Atlético Tucumán	85	(5)
2016–2020	Huracán	27	(2)
2017–2018	→ Atlético Tucumán (loan)	16	(0)
2018–2019	→ Den Bosch (loan)	19	(1)
2020–2021	Almagro	38	(1)
2022	San Telmo	15	(0)
2022–	Universitario de Sucre	7	(1)
- * Club domestic league appearances and goals as of 14:04, 1 August 2022 (UTC)

Nicolás Romat (born 6 May 1988) is an Argentine professional footballer who plays as a right-back for Bolivian club Universitario de Sucre.
