= Rafael García (footballer, born 1989) =

Uruguayan footballer

Personal information
- Full name: Rafael García Casanova
- Date of birth: 6 January 1989 (age 37)
- Place of birth: Montevideo, Uruguay
- Height: 1.83 m (6 ft 0 in)
- Position: Centre-back

Team information
- Current team: Nacional (youth manager)

Youth career
- Deportivo Maldonado
- 2005–2010: Nacional

Senior career*
| Years | Team | Apps | (Gls) |
| 2010–2019 | Nacional | 90 | (1) |
| 2010–2011 | → Rampla Juniors (loan) | 24 | (1) |
| 2012–2013 | → Fénix (loan) | 24 | (1) |
| 2015 | → Morelia (loan) | 6 | (0) |
| 2016 | → Defensa y Justicia (loan) | 0 | (0) |
| 2017–2018 | → Atlético Tucumán (loan) | 22 | (0) |
| 2020 | Colón | 5 | (0) |
| 2020–2021 | Nacional | 18 | (0) |
| 2022–2023 | Cerro Largo | 54 | (0) |

Managerial career
- 2024–: Nacional (youth)
- 2024: Nacional (interim)
- * Club domestic league appearances and goals

Rafael García Casanova (born 6 January 1989) is an Uruguayan football manager and former player who played as a centre-back. He is the current manager of Nacional's youth categories.

== Honours ==
Nacional

- Uruguayan Primera División (1): 2011–12
