= 2018–19 Torneo Federal A =

VI Torneo Federal A
- Season: 2018–19
- Champions: Estudiantes (RC) (1st divisional title)
- Promoted: Estudiantes (RC); Alvarado
- Relegated: Altos Hornos Zapla; Atlético Paraná; Deportivo Roca; Gimnasia y Tiro; Independiente (N); Juventud Antoniana; Racing (C); San Lorenzo; San Jorge (T)
- Matches played: 473
- Goals scored: 1,026 (2.17 per match)
- Biggest home win: Sportivo Las Parejas 5-0 Atlético Paraná (February 24)
- Biggest away win: Independiente (N) 0-4 Ferro Carril Oeste (GP) (February 13)
- Highest scoring: Cipolletti 5-3 Deportivo Madryn (November 18)
- All statistics correct as of June 28, 2019.

The 2018–19 Argentine Torneo Federal A is the 6th season of the third tier of the Argentine football league system. The tournament is reserved for teams indirectly affiliated to the Asociación del Fútbol Argentino (AFA), while teams affiliated to AFA have to play the Primera B Metropolitana, which is the other third tier competition. The champion is promoted to Primera B Nacional. 36 teams are competing in the league, 29 returning from the 2017–18 season, 3 teams that were relegated from Primera B Nacional and 4 teams promoted from Federal B. The regular season began on September 8, 2018 and will end in June 2019.

== Format ==
=== First stage ===
The teams were divided into four zones with nine teams (a total of 36 teams) in each zone and it was played in a round-robin tournament whereby each team played each one of the other teams two times. The teams placed 1st to 4th from each zone qualified for the Second Stage. The remaining twenty three teams qualify for the Revalida Stage.

=== Championship stages ===
==== Second stage ====
The teams were divided into two zones with eight teams each and it was played in a round-robin tournament whereby each team played each one of the other teams one time. The teams first and second place and the best third place team from the two zones qualified for the Third Stage or Pentagonal Final. The remaining third place team qualify for the Third Phase of the Revalida Stage. The other ten teams qualify for the Second Phase of the Revalida Stage.

==== Third stage ====
The five teams that qualified for the third stage or Pentagonal Final play in a round-robin tournament whereby each team played each one of the other teams one time. The winner was declared champion and automatically promoted to the Primera B Nacional. The other four teams qualify for the Fourth Phase of the Revalida Stage.

=== Revalida Stages ===
The Revalida Stage is divided in several phases: First, the twenty teams that did not qualify for the Championship Stages were divided into the same four zones of the First Stage and it was played in a round-robin tournament whereby each team played each one of the other teams two times. The first place team of each zone qualified for the Second Phase. The second phase is played between the four teams that qualified from the First Phase and the ten teams that qualified from the Second Stage of the Championship Stage. The seven winners qualify for the Third Phase.
The Third Phase is played between the seven teams that qualified from the Second Phase and the team that qualified from the Second Stage of the Championship Stage. The four winners qualify for the Fourth Phase.

The Fourth Phase is played between the four teams that qualified from the Third Phase and the four teams that qualified from the Third Stage of the Championship Stage. The four winners qualify for the Fifth Phase. The Fifth and Sixth Phase is played between the remaining teams and aims to get the Second promotion to the Primera B Nacional.

=== Relegation ===
After the First Phase of the Revalida Stage a table was drawn up with the average of points obtained in the First Stage and the First Phase of the Revalida Stage. It is determined by dividing the points by the number of games played and the bottom team of each four zones was relegated to the Torneo Regional Federal Amateur. Following the Revalida Stage, another table was drawn up with the remaining teams that played the Revalida Stage and the bottom four teams were relegated to the Torneo Regional Federal Amateur, giving a total of eight teams relegated.

== Club information ==
Locations of the 2018-19 season teams.
Blue: Zone A; Yellow: Zone B;
Green: Zone C; Red: Zone D.

=== Zone A ===
| Team | City | Stadium |
|---|---|---|
| Alvarado | Mar del Plata | (None) ^{1} |
| Cipolletti | Cipolletti | La Visera de Cemento |
| Deportivo Madryn | Puerto Madryn | Coliseo del Golfo |
| Deportivo Roca | General Roca | Luis Maiolino |
| Ferro Carril Oeste | General Pico | El Coloso del Barrio Talleres |
| Independiente | Neuquén | La Chacra |
| Sansinena | General Cerri | Luis Molina |
| Sol de Mayo | Viedma | Sol de Mayo |
| Villa Mitre | Bahía Blanca | El Fortín |

^{1} Play their home games at Estadio José María Minella.

=== Zone B ===
| Team | City | Stadium |
|---|---|---|
| Atlético Paraná | Paraná | Pedro Mutio |
| Defensores | Pronunciamiento | Delio Cardozo |
| Defensores de Belgrano | Villa Ramallo | Salomón Boeseldín |
| Deportivo Camioneros | General Rodríguez | Hugo Moyano |
| Douglas Haig | Pergamino | Miguel Morales |
| Gimnasia y Esgrima | Concepción del Uruguay | Manuel y Ramón Núñez |
| Juventud Unida | Gualeguaychú | De los Eucaliptos |
| Sportivo Las Parejas | Las Parejas | Fortaleza del Lobo |
| Unión | Sunchales | La Fortaleza |

=== Zone C ===
| Team | City | Stadium |
|---|---|---|
| Deportivo Maipú | Maipú | Higinio Sperdutti |
| Desamparados | San Juan | El Serpentario |
| Estudiantes | Río Cuarto | Ciudad de Río Cuarto |
| Estudiantes | San Luis | Héctor Odicino – Pedro Benoza |
| Huracán Las Heras | Las Heras | General San Martín |
| Juventud Unida Universitario | San Luis | Mario Diez |
| Racing | Córdoba | Miguel Sancho |
| San Lorenzo | Catamarca | Malvinas Argentinas |
| Sportivo Belgrano | San Francisco | Oscar Boero |

=== Zone D ===
| Team | City | Stadium |
|---|---|---|
| Altos Hornos Zapla | Palpalá | Emilio Fabrizzi |
| Boca Unidos | Corrientes | José Antonio Romero Feris |
| Chaco For Ever | Resistencia | Juan Alberto García |
| Crucero del Norte | Garupá | Andrés Guacurarí |
| Gimnasia y Tiro | Salta | Gigante del Norte |
| Juventud Antoniana | Salta | Fray Honorato Pistoia |
| San Jorge | San Miguel de Tucumán | Senador Luis Cruz |
| San Martín | Formosa | 17 De Octubre |
| Sarmiento | Resistencia | Centenario |

== First stage ==
=== Zone A ===
| Pos | Team | Pld | W | D | L | GF | GA | GD | Pts | Qualification |
|---|---|---|---|---|---|---|---|---|---|---|
| 1 | Alvarado | 16 | 9 | 5 | 2 | 24 | 15 | +9 | 32 | Advance to Championship Stage |
| 2 | Villa Mitre | 16 | 7 | 6 | 3 | 17 | 12 | +5 | 27 | Advance to Championship Stage |
| 3 | Sansinena | 16 | 6 | 7 | 3 | 17 | 11 | +6 | 25 | Advance to Championship Stage |
| 4 | Sol de Mayo | 16 | 7 | 3 | 6 | 15 | 16 | −1 | 24 | Advance to Championship Stage |
| 5 | Deportivo Madryn | 16 | 6 | 4 | 6 | 18 | 22 | −4 | 22 | Advance to Reválida Stage |
| 6 | Cipolletti | 16 | 4 | 7 | 5 | 18 | 15 | +3 | 19 | Advance to Reválida Stage |
| 7 | Deportivo Roca | 16 | 3 | 7 | 6 | 12 | 15 | −3 | 16 | Advance to Reválida Stage |
| 8 | Ferro Carril Oeste (GP) | 16 | 4 | 4 | 8 | 16 | 21 | −5 | 16 | Advance to Reválida Stage |
| 9 | Independiente (N) | 16 | 1 | 7 | 8 | 11 | 21 | −10 | 10 | Advance to Reválida Stage |

Source: AFA
Rules for classification: 1) points; 2) Head-to-head points; 3) Head-to-head goal difference; 4) Head-to-head goals scored; 5) Head-to-head away goals; 6) goal difference; 7) goals scored; 8) away goals scored; 9) draw of lots.

==== Results ====
| Home \ Away | ALV | CIP | DMA | DRO | FCO | INE | SAN | SOL | VMI |
|---|---|---|---|---|---|---|---|---|---|
| Alvarado | | 1–1 | 3–0 | 0–0 | 2–1 | 1–0 | 1–0 | 1–0 | 2–2 |
| Cipolletti | 0–1 | | 5–3 | 0–0 | 2–0 | 0–0 | 1–1 | 3–0 | 1–1 |
| Deportivo Madryn | 1–3 | 1–0 | | 1–0 | 2–1 | 1–0 | 1–1 | 2–1 | 1–0 |
| Deportivo Roca | 2–3 | 1–0 | 2–2 | | 1–0 | 1–1 | 0–1 | 2–2 | 2–0 |
| Ferro Carril Oeste (GP) | 1–2 | 2–2 | 2–1 | 1–0 | | 3–1 | 1–1 | 1–1 | 0–2 |
| Independiente (N) | 2–2 | 0–1 | 1–1 | 0–0 | 1–1 | | 1–2 | 1–0 | 2–2 |
| Sansinena | 2–1 | 2–2 | 0–0 | 2–0 | 0–1 | 2–0 | | 0–1 | 0–0 |
| Sol de Mayo | 2–0 | 1–0 | 1–0 | 1–1 | 2–1 | 1–0 | 1–3 | | 0–1 |
| Villa Mitre | 1–1 | 1–0 | 2–1 | 1–0 | 2–0 | 3–1 | 0–0 | 0–1 | |

Updated to match(es) played on unknown. Source: AFA
Legend: Blue = home team win; Yellow = draw; Red = away team win.

=== Zone B ===
| Pos | Team | Pld | W | D | L | GF | GA | GD | Pts | Qualification |
|---|---|---|---|---|---|---|---|---|---|---|
| 1 | Unión (S) | 16 | 7 | 4 | 5 | 22 | 18 | +4 | 25 | Advance to Championship Stage |
| 2 | Gimnasia y Esgrima (CdU) | 16 | 6 | 6 | 4 | 20 | 14 | +6 | 24 | Advance to Championship Stage |
| 3 | Defensores de Belgrano (VR) | 16 | 6 | 5 | 5 | 19 | 18 | +1 | 23 | Advance to Championship Stage |
| 4 | Deportivo Camioneros | 16 | 4 | 9 | 3 | 14 | 12 | +2 | 21 (Note: Deportivo Camioneros ahead of Juventud Unida (G) on head-to-head points: Deportivo Camioneros–Juventud Unida (G) 0–0, Juventud Unida (G)–Deportivo Camioneros 2–3.) | Advance to Championship Stage |
| 5 | Juventud Unida (G) | 16 | 5 | 6 | 5 | 15 | 13 | +2 | 21 | Advance to Reválida Stage |
| 6 | Defensores (P) | 16 | 4 | 8 | 4 | 18 | 20 | −2 | 20 | Advance to Reválida Stage |
| 7 | Sportivo Las Parejas | 16 | 3 | 9 | 4 | 9 | 9 | 0 | 18 | Advance to Reválida Stage |
| 8 | Atlético Paraná | 16 | 3 | 8 | 5 | 13 | 19 | −6 | 17 | Advance to Reválida Stage |
| 9 | Douglas Haig | 16 | 2 | 9 | 5 | 10 | 17 | −7 | 15 | Advance to Reválida Stage |

Source: AFA
Rules for classification: 1) points; 2) Head-to-head points; 3) Head-to-head goal difference; 4) Head-to-head goals scored; 5) Head-to-head away goals; 6) goal difference; 7) goals scored; 8) away goals scored; 9) draw of lots.

==== Results ====
| Home \ Away | APA | DPR | DEF | DEP | DOU | GYE | JUG | SLP | UNS |
|---|---|---|---|---|---|---|---|---|---|
| Atlético Paraná | | 1–1 | 3–1 | 1–1 | 0–1 | 2–1 | 0–0 | 0–0 | 1–4 |
| Defensores (P) | 0–0 | | 1–1 | 2–0 | 0–0 | 0–2 | 0–0 | 1–1 | 3–3 |
| Defensores de Belgrano (VR) | 2–1 | 0–1 | | 0–0 | 2–0 | 3–0 | 1–1 | 0–0 | 2–1 |
| Deportivo Camioneros | 0–0 | 2–2 | 2–0 | | 0–0 | 1–1 | 0–0 | 0–0 | 2–1 |
| Douglas Haig | 1–1 | 0–1 | 2–2 | 0–2 | | 1–1 | 0–1 | 0–0 | 1–1 |
| Gimnasia y Esgrima (CdU) | 5–1 | 4–2 | 0–1 | 1–0 | 1–1 | | 1–2 | 0–0 | 1–0 |
| Juventud Unida (G) | 1–1 | 2–0 | 3–0 | 2–3 | 1–2 | 0–2 | | 1–1 | 1–0 |
| Sportivo Las Parejas | 0–1 | 0–1 | 2–1 | 1–1 | 3–0 | 0–0 | 1–0 | | 0–2 |
| Unión (S) | 1–0 | 4–3 | 1–3 | 1–0 | 1–1 | 0–0 | 1–0 | 1–0 | |

Updated to match(es) played on unknown. Source: AFA
Legend: Blue = home team win; Yellow = draw; Red = away team win.

=== Zone C ===
| Pos | Team | Pld | W | D | L | GF | GA | GD | Pts | Qualification |
|---|---|---|---|---|---|---|---|---|---|---|
| 1 | Estudiantes (RC) | 16 | 6 | 9 | 1 | 19 | 11 | +8 | 27 | Advance to Championship Stage |
| 2 | Desamparados | 16 | 6 | 6 | 4 | 15 | 11 | +4 | 24 (Note: Desamparados ahead of Huracán Las Heras on head-to-head points: Huracán Las Heras–Desamparados 1–2, Desamparados–Huracán Las Heras 1–0.) | Advance to Championship Stage |
| 3 | Huracán Las Heras | 16 | 6 | 6 | 4 | 16 | 12 | +4 | 24 | Advance to Championship Stage |
| 4 | Deportivo Maipú | 16 | 5 | 8 | 3 | 16 | 14 | +2 | 23 | Advance to Championship Stage |
| 5 | Estudiantes (SL) | 16 | 5 | 7 | 4 | 19 | 16 | +3 | 22 | Advance to Reválida Stage |
| 6 | San Lorenzo | 16 | 4 | 7 | 5 | 17 | 19 | −2 | 19 | Advance to Reválida Stage |
| 7 | Sportivo Belgrano | 16 | 4 | 6 | 6 | 12 | 16 | −4 | 18 | Advance to Reválida Stage |
| 8 | Juventud Unida Universitario | 16 | 3 | 7 | 6 | 16 | 24 | −8 | 16 | Advance to Reválida Stage |
| 9 | Racing (C) | 16 | 3 | 4 | 9 | 12 | 19 | −7 | 13 | Advance to Reválida Stage |

Source: AFA
Rules for classification: 1) points; 2) Head-to-head points; 3) Head-to-head goal difference; 4) Head-to-head goals scored; 5) Head-to-head away goals; 6) goal difference; 7) goals scored; 8) away goals scored; 9) draw of lots.

==== Results ====
| Home \ Away | DEM | DES | ERC | ESL | HLH | JUU | RAC | SLA | SPB |
|---|---|---|---|---|---|---|---|---|---|
| Deportivo Maipú | | 1–0 | 0–0 | 2–2 | 0–0 | 1–1 | 2–0 | 3–1 | 0–0 |
| Desamparados | 0–1 | | 1–1 | 2–2 | 1–0 | 2–0 | 1–1 | 1–0 | 1–0 |
| Estudiantes (RC) | 2–0 | 1–0 | | 1–1 | 1–0 | 3–0 | 2–1 | 2–2 | 3–3 |
| Estudiantes (SL) | 0–2 | 0–3 | 0–0 | | 3–0 | 1–1 | 2–0 | 1–1 | 2–0 |
| Huracán Las Heras | 1–1 | 1–2 | 0–0 | 1–1 | | 1–0 | 1–0 | 1–1 | 3–1 |
| Juventud Unida Universitario | 1–1 | 1–1 | 2–2 | 0–3 | 1–1 | | 1–3 | 2–2 | 1–0 |
| Racing (C) | 3–0 | 2–0 | 0–0 | 0–1 | 0–2 | 0–2 | | 1–1 | 0–0 |
| San Lorenzo | 3–2 | 0–0 | 1–0 | 1–0 | 0–2 | 1–2 | 2–0 | | 1–1 |
| Sportivo Belgrano | 0–0 | 0–0 | 0–1 | 2–0 | 0–2 | 2–1 | 2–1 | 1–0 | |

Updated to match(es) played on unknown. Source: AFA
Legend: Blue = home team win; Yellow = draw; Red = away team win.

=== Zone D ===
| Pos | Team | Pld | W | D | L | GF | GA | GD | Pts | Qualification |
|---|---|---|---|---|---|---|---|---|---|---|
| 1 | Boca Unidos | 16 | 11 | 3 | 2 | 22 | 9 | +13 | 36 | Advance to Championship Stage |
| 2 | Chaco For Ever | 16 | 8 | 6 | 2 | 26 | 14 | +12 | 30 | Advance to Championship Stage |
| 3 | Sarmiento (R) | 16 | 8 | 3 | 5 | 22 | 14 | +8 | 27 | Advance to Championship Stage |
| 4 | San Jorge (T) | 16 | 7 | 5 | 4 | 26 | 18 | +8 | 26 | Advance to Championship Stage |
| 5 | Crucero del Norte | 16 | 7 | 3 | 6 | 21 | 17 | +4 | 24 | Advance to Reválida Stage |
| 6 | Gimnasia y Tiro | 16 | 4 | 5 | 7 | 11 | 21 | −10 | 17 | Advance to Reválida Stage |
| 7 | Juventud Antoniana | 16 | 1 | 11 | 4 | 13 | 18 | −5 | 14 | Advance to Reválida Stage |
| 8 | Altos Hornos Zapla | 16 | 3 | 3 | 10 | 10 | 26 | −16 | 12 | Advance to Reválida Stage |
| 9 | San Martín (F) | 16 | 1 | 5 | 10 | 9 | 23 | −14 | 8 | Advance to Reválida Stage |

Source: AFA
Rules for classification: 1) points; 2) goal difference; 3) goals scored; 4) away goals scored; 5) draw of lots.

==== Results ====
| Home \ Away | AHZ | BOU | CFE | CRU | GYT | JUA | SJT | SAF | SAR |
|---|---|---|---|---|---|---|---|---|---|
| Altos Hornos Zapla | | 1–2 | 1–1 | 0–2 | 2–1 | 1–1 | 1–2 | 2–0 | 0–0 |
| Boca Unidos | 1–0 | | 1–2 | 2–1 | 2–0 | 2–0 | 1–1 | 3–0 | 1–0 |
| Chaco For Ever | 3–0 | 0–0 | | 2–0 | 3–0 | 4–2 | 1–0 | 1–0 | 1–3 |
| Crucero del Norte | 4–0 | 0–2 | 2–1 | | 2–0 | 1–0 | 1–0 | 2–2 | 1–2 |
| Gimnasia y Tiro | 1–0 | 3–1 | 1–3 | 0–0 | | 1–1 | 0–0 | 2–0 | 1–0 |
| Juventud Antoniana | 1–0 | 1–1 | 1–1 | 1–1 | 0–0 | | 3–3 | 0–0 | 1–1 |
| San Jorge (T) | 4–0 | 0–1 | 2–2 | 3–1 | 3–0 | 1–1 | | 0–2 | 2–1 |
| San Martín (F) | 0–1 | 0–1 | 0–0 | 0–3 | 1–1 | 0–0 | 2–3 | | 1–2 |
| Sarmiento (R) | 3–1 | 0–1 | 1–1 | 2–0 | 3–0 | 1–0 | 1–2 | 2–1 | |

Updated to match(es) played on unknown. Source: AFA
Legend: Blue = home team win; Yellow = draw; Red = away team win.

== Championship Stage ==
=== Second stage ===
==== Zone A ====
| Pos | Team | Pld | W | D | L | GF | GA | GD | Pts | Qualification |
|---|---|---|---|---|---|---|---|---|---|---|
| 1 | Alvarado | 7 | 3 | 3 | 1 | 10 | 6 | +4 | 12 (Note: Alvarado ahead of Defensores de Belgrano (VR) on goal difference: Alvarado +4 goal difference; Defensores de Belgrano (VR) +2 goal difference.) | Advance to Third Stage |
| 2 | Defensores de Belgrano (VR) | 7 | 3 | 3 | 1 | 9 | 7 | +2 | 12 | Advance to Third Stage |
| 3 | Gimnasia y Esgrima (CdU) | 7 | 2 | 5 | 0 | 10 | 7 | +3 | 11 (Note: Gimnasia y Esgrima (CdU) ahead of Sansinena on goals scored: Gimnasia y Esgrima (CdU) 10 goals scored; Sansinena 7 goals scored.) | Advance to Third Phase of Reválida Stage |
| 4 | Sansinena | 7 | 2 | 5 | 0 | 7 | 4 | +3 | 11 | Advance to Second Phase of Reválida Stage |
| 5 | Villa Mitre | 7 | 2 | 4 | 1 | 8 | 5 | +3 | 10 | Advance to Second Phase of Reválida Stage |
| 6 | Unión (S) | 7 | 2 | 2 | 3 | 9 | 12 | −3 | 8 | Advance to Second Phase of Reválida Stage |
| 7 | Deportivo Camioneros | 7 | 1 | 1 | 5 | 10 | 17 | −7 | 4 | Advance to Second Phase of Reválida Stage |
| 8 | Sol de Mayo | 7 | 0 | 3 | 4 | 7 | 12 | −5 | 3 | Advance to Second Phase of Reválida Stage |

Source: AFA
Rules for classification: 1) points; 2) Head-to-head points; 3) Head-to-head goal difference; 4) Head-to-head goals scored; 5) Head-to-head away goals; 6) goal difference; 7) goals scored; 8) away goals scored; 9) draw of lots.

===== Results =====
| Home \ Away | ALV | DEF | DEP | GYE | SAN | SOL | UNS | VMI |
|---|---|---|---|---|---|---|---|---|
| Alvarado | | 0–0 | 3–1 | | | | 2–1 | 1–1 |
| Defensores de Belgrano (VR) | | | | | 0–0 | 2–1 | | 2–1 |
| Deportivo Camioneros | | 1–3 | | | | 2–1 | | 0–2 |
| Gimnasia y Esgrima (CdU) | 1–1 | 2–0 | 3–2 | | | | 1–1 | |
| Sansinena | 1–0 | | 3–3 | 0–0 | | | | |
| Sol de Mayo | 1–3 | | | 3–3 | 0–0 | | | |
| Unión (S) | | 2–2 | 2–1 | | 1–3 | 1–0 | | |
| Villa Mitre | | | | 0–0 | 0–0 | 1–1 | 3–1 | |

Updated to match(es) played on unknown. Source: AFA
Legend: Blue = home team win; Yellow = draw; Red = away team win.

==== Zone B ====
| Pos | Team | Pld | W | D | L | GF | GA | GD | Pts | Qualification |
|---|---|---|---|---|---|---|---|---|---|---|
| 1 | Estudiantes (RC) | 7 | 4 | 3 | 0 | 16 | 8 | +8 | 15 | Advance to Third Stage |
| 2 | Sarmiento (R) | 7 | 3 | 3 | 1 | 9 | 5 | +4 | 12 | Advance to Third Stage |
| 3 | San Jorge (T) | 7 | 3 | 2 | 2 | 16 | 11 | +5 | 11 (Note: San Jorge (T) ahead of Chaco For Ever on goal difference: San Jorge (T) +5 goal difference; Chaco For Ever +1 goal difference.) | Advance to Third Stage |
| 4 | Chaco For Ever | 7 | 3 | 2 | 2 | 13 | 12 | +1 | 11 | Advance to Second Phase of Reválida Stage |
| 5 | Huracán Las Heras | 7 | 3 | 0 | 4 | 6 | 10 | −4 | 9 | Advance to Second Phase of Reválida Stage |
| 6 | Desamparados | 7 | 2 | 2 | 3 | 4 | 8 | −4 | 8 | Advance to Second Phase of Reválida Stage |
| 7 | Deportivo Maipú | 7 | 2 | 0 | 5 | 9 | 14 | −5 | 6 | Advance to Second Phase of Reválida Stage |
| 8 | Boca Unidos | 7 | 1 | 2 | 4 | 5 | 10 | −5 | 5 | Advance to Second Phase of Reválida Stage |

Source: AFA
Rules for classification: 1) points; 2) Head-to-head points; 3) Head-to-head goal difference; 4) Head-to-head goals scored; 5) Head-to-head away goals; 6) goal difference; 7) goals scored; 8) away goals scored; 9) draw of lots.

===== Results =====
| Home \ Away | BOU | CFE | DEM | DES | ERC | HLH | SJT | SAR |
|---|---|---|---|---|---|---|---|---|
| Boca Unidos | | | | 1–0 | 1–1 | | 1–1 | 1–2 |
| Chaco For Ever | 2–0 | | | | 1–4 | | 3–3 | 1–1 |
| Deportivo Maipú | 2–0 | 2–3 | | | | | 2–1 | |
| Desamparados | | 2–1 | 1–0 | | 1–1 | 0–2 | | |
| Estudiantes (RC) | | | 4–2 | | | 1–0 | 4–2 | 1–1 |
| Huracán Las Heras | 2–1 | 0–2 | 2–1 | | | | | |
| San Jorge (T) | | | | 3–0 | | 4–0 | | 2–1 |
| Sarmiento (R) | | | 3–0 | 0–0 | | 1–0 | | |

Updated to match(es) played on unknown. Source: AFA
Legend: Blue = home team win; Yellow = draw; Red = away team win.

=== Ranking of third-placed teams ===
| Pos | Grp | Team | Pld | W | D | L | GF | GA | GD | Pts | Qualification |
|---|---|---|---|---|---|---|---|---|---|---|---|
| 1 | B | San Jorge (T) | 7 | 3 | 2 | 2 | 16 | 11 | +5 | 11 | Advance to Third Stage |
| 2 | A | Gimnasia y Esgrima (CdU) | 7 | 2 | 5 | 0 | 10 | 7 | +3 | 11 | Advance to Third Phase of Reválida Stage |

Rules for classification: 1) points; 2) goal difference; 3) goal scored; 4) draw of lots.

=== Third stage ===
| Pos | Team | Pld | W | D | L | GF | GA | GD | Pts | Qualification |
|---|---|---|---|---|---|---|---|---|---|---|
| 1 | Estudiantes (RC) (C, P) | 4 | 4 | 0 | 0 | 7 | 1 | +6 | 12 | Promoted to Primera B Nacional |
| 2 | Sarmiento (R) | 4 | 3 | 0 | 1 | 9 | 7 | +2 | 9 | Advance to Fourth Phase of Reválida Stage |
| 3 | Alvarado | 4 | 1 | 1 | 2 | 4 | 5 | −1 | 4 | Advance to Fourth Phase of Reválida Stage |
| 4 | San Jorge (T) | 4 | 1 | 1 | 2 | 3 | 6 | −3 | 4 | Advance to Fourth Phase of Reválida Stage |
| 5 | Defensores de Belgrano (VR) | 4 | 0 | 0 | 4 | 3 | 7 | −4 | 0 | Advance to Fourth Phase of Reválida Stage |

Updated to match(es) played on April 29, 2019. Source: AFA
Rules for classification: 1) points; 2) goal difference; 3) goals scored; 4) draw of lots.
(C) Champions; (P) Promoted

==== Results ====
| Home \ Away | ALV | DEF | ERC | SJT | SAR |
|---|---|---|---|---|---|
| Alvarado | | 1–0 | | 1–1 | |
| Defensores de Belgrano (VR) | | | 0–1 | | 3–4 |
| Estudiantes (RC) | 2–1 | | | | 2–0 |
| San Jorge (T) | | 1–0 | 0–2 | | |
| Sarmiento (R) | 2–1 | | | 3–1 | |

Updated to match(es) played on unknown. Source: AFA
Legend: Blue = home team win; Yellow = draw; Red = away team win.

== Reválida Stage ==
=== First phase ===
==== Zone A ====
| Pos | Team | Pld | W | D | L | GF | GA | GD | Pts | Qualification |
|---|---|---|---|---|---|---|---|---|---|---|
| 1 | Deportivo Madryn | 8 | 4 | 4 | 0 | 12 | 5 | +7 | 16 | Advance to Second Phase of Reválida Stage |
| 2 | Cipolletti | 8 | 3 | 3 | 2 | 11 | 5 | +6 | 12 | |
| 3 | Ferro Carril Oeste (GP) | 8 | 2 | 4 | 2 | 11 | 7 | +4 | 10 (Note: The match between Deportivo Roca and Ferro Carril Oeste (GP) in the round 9 of the Revalida was awarded to Deportivo Roca a 1–0 win as a result of Ferro Carril Oeste (GP) fielding an ineligible player. Originally the match ended in a 1–1 draw.) | |
| 4 | Deportivo Roca | 8 | 2 | 2 | 4 | 4 | 10 | −6 | 8 (Note: The match between Independiente (N) and Deportivo Roca in the round 10 of the Revalida was awarded as a 0–1 loss for both teams as a result of Independiente (N) fielding an ineligible player. Independiente (N) originally won the match 4–1.) | |
| 5 | Independiente (N) | 8 | 1 | 1 | 6 | 3 | 16 | −13 | 4 | |

Source: AFA
Rules for classification: 1) points; 2) Head-to-head points; 3) Head-to-head goal difference; 4) Head-to-head goals scored; 5) Head-to-head away goals; 6) goal difference; 7) goals scored; 8) away goals scored; 9) draw of lots.

===== Results =====
| Home \ Away | CIP | DMA | DRO | FCO | INE |
|---|---|---|---|---|---|
| Cipolletti | | 1–1 | 2–0 | 2–2 | 4–0 |
| Deportivo Madryn | 1–0 | | 4–0 | 1–1 | 2–1 |
| Deportivo Roca | 1–0 | 1–1 | | 1–0 (Note: The Deportivo Roca - Ferro Carril Oeste (GP) match was awarded as a 1–0 win to Deportivo Roca, after Ferro Carril Oeste (GP) fielded an ineligible player. Originally the match ended in a 1–1 draw.) | 1–2 |
| Ferro Carril Oeste (GP) | 0–2 | 1–1 | 0–0 | | 3–0 |
| Independiente (N) | 0–0 | 0–1 | 0–1 (Note: The Independiente (N) - Deportivo Roca match was awarded as a 0–1 loss for both teams, after Independiente (N) fielded an ineligible player. Independiente (N) originally won the match 4–1.) | 0–4 | |

Updated to match(es) played on unknown. Source: AFA
Legend: Blue = home team win; Yellow = draw; Red = away team win.

==== Zone B ====
| Pos | Team | Pld | W | D | L | GF | GA | GD | Pts | Qualification |
|---|---|---|---|---|---|---|---|---|---|---|
| 1 | Sportivo Las Parejas | 8 | 4 | 2 | 2 | 12 | 8 | +4 | 14 (Note: Sportivo Las Parejas ahead of Defensores (P) on head-to-head points: Sportivo Las Parejas–Defensores (P) 1–0, Defensores (P)–Sportivo Las Parejas 0–0.) | Advance to Second Phase of Reválida Stage |
| 2 | Defensores (P) | 8 | 4 | 2 | 2 | 11 | 7 | +4 | 14 | |
| 3 | Douglas Haig | 8 | 3 | 4 | 1 | 11 | 7 | +4 | 13 | |
| 4 | Juventud Unida (G) | 8 | 1 | 3 | 4 | 7 | 13 | −6 | 6 (Note: Juventud Unida (G) ahead of Atlético Paraná on head-to-head away goals scored: Atlético Paraná–Juventud Unida (G) 1–1, Juventud Unida (G)–Atlético Paraná 0–0.) | |
| 5 | Atlético Paraná | 8 | 1 | 3 | 4 | 9 | 15 | −6 | 6 | |

Source: AFA
Rules for classification: 1) points; 2) Head-to-head points; 3) Head-to-head goal difference; 4) Head-to-head goals scored; 5) Head-to-head away goals; 6) goal difference; 7) goals scored; 8) away goals scored; 9) draw of lots.

===== Results =====
| Home \ Away | APA | DPR | DOU | JUG | SLP |
|---|---|---|---|---|---|
| Atlético Paraná | | 2–3 | 1–2 | 1–1 | 0–1 |
| Defensores (P) | 1–3 | | 0–0 | 2–0 | 0–0 |
| Douglas Haig | 2–2 | 0–1 | | 2–0 | 3–1 |
| Juventud Unida (G) | 0–0 | 1–4 | 1–1 | | 1–2 |
| Sportivo Las Parejas | 5–0 | 1–0 | 1–1 | 1–3 | |

Updated to match(es) played on unknown. Source: AFA
Legend: Blue = home team win; Yellow = draw; Red = away team win.

==== Zone C ====
| Pos | Team | Pld | W | D | L | GF | GA | GD | Pts | Qualification |
|---|---|---|---|---|---|---|---|---|---|---|
| 1 | Estudiantes (SL) | 8 | 4 | 3 | 1 | 10 | 7 | +3 | 15 | Advance to Second Phase of Reválida Stage |
| 2 | Sportivo Belgrano | 8 | 3 | 4 | 1 | 15 | 11 | +4 | 13 | |
| 3 | Racing (C) | 8 | 3 | 2 | 3 | 13 | 10 | +3 | 11 | |
| 4 | Juventud Unida Universitario | 8 | 2 | 4 | 2 | 8 | 12 | −4 | 10 | |
| 5 | San Lorenzo | 8 | 0 | 3 | 5 | 11 | 17 | −6 | 3 | |

Source: AFA
Rules for classification: 1) points; 2) Head-to-head points; 3) Head-to-head goal difference; 4) Head-to-head goals scored; 5) Head-to-head away goals; 6) goal difference; 7) goals scored; 8) away goals scored; 9) draw of lots.

===== Results =====
| Home \ Away | ESL | JUU | RAC | SLA | SPB |
|---|---|---|---|---|---|
| Estudiantes (SL) | | 1–1 | 1–0 | 2–1 | 1–1 |
| Juventud Unida Universitario | 1–0 | | 0–0 | 2–1 | 1–4 |
| Racing (C) | 0–1 | 5–2 | | 2–0 | 1–2 |
| San Lorenzo | 1–2 | 1–1 | 3–3 | | 2–3 |
| Sportivo Belgrano | 2–2 | 0–0 | 1–2 | 2–2 | |

Updated to match(es) played on unknown. Source: AFA
Legend: Blue = home team win; Yellow = draw; Red = away team win.

==== Zone D ====
| Pos | Team | Pld | W | D | L | GF | GA | GD | Pts | Qualification |
|---|---|---|---|---|---|---|---|---|---|---|
| 1 | San Martín (F) | 8 | 5 | 2 | 1 | 14 | 6 | +8 | 17 | Advance to Second Phase of Reválida Stage |
| 2 | Juventud Antoniana | 8 | 3 | 2 | 3 | 8 | 8 | 0 | 11 | |
| 3 | Crucero del Norte | 8 | 3 | 1 | 4 | 5 | 6 | −1 | 10 | |
| 4 | Altos Hornos Zapla | 8 | 2 | 3 | 3 | 5 | 6 | −1 | 9 | |
| 5 | Gimnasia y Tiro | 8 | 2 | 2 | 4 | 4 | 10 | −6 | 8 | |

Source: AFA
Rules for classification: 1) points; 2) Head-to-head points; 3) Head-to-head goal difference; 4) Head-to-head goals scored; 5) Head-to-head away goals; 6) goal difference; 7) goals scored; 8) away goals scored; 9) draw of lots.

===== Results =====
| Home \ Away | AHZ | CRU | GYT | JUA | SAF |
|---|---|---|---|---|---|
| Altos Hornos Zapla | | 0–0 | 1–0 | 1–0 | 1–1 |
| Crucero del Norte | 1–0 | | 1–0 | 1–2 | 1–0 |
| Gimnasia y Tiro | 1–0 | 1–0 | | 0–2 | 1–1 |
| Juventud Antoniana | 1–1 | 1–0 | 1–1 | | 1–2 |
| San Martín (F) | 2–1 | 2–1 | 4–0 | 2–0 | |

Updated to match(es) played on unknown. Source: AFA
Legend: Blue = home team win; Yellow = draw; Red = away team win.

=== Second phase ===
| Pos | Grp | Team | Pld | W | D | L | GF | GA | GD | Pts | Qualification |
|---|---|---|---|---|---|---|---|---|---|---|---|
| 1 | A | Sansinena | 7 | 2 | 5 | 0 | 7 | 4 | +3 | 11 | Qualified from Second Stage |
| 2 | B | Chaco For Ever | 7 | 3 | 2 | 2 | 13 | 12 | +1 | 11 | Qualified from Second Stage |
| 3 | A | Villa Mitre | 7 | 2 | 4 | 1 | 8 | 5 | +3 | 10 | Qualified from Second Stage |
| 4 | B | Huracán Las Heras | 7 | 3 | 0 | 4 | 6 | 10 | −4 | 9 | Qualified from Second Stage |
| 5 | A | Unión (S) | 7 | 2 | 2 | 3 | 9 | 12 | −3 | 8 | Qualified from Second Stage |
| 6 | B | Desamparados | 7 | 2 | 2 | 3 | 4 | 8 | −4 | 8 | Qualified from Second Stage |
| 7 | B | Deportivo Maipú | 7 | 2 | 0 | 5 | 9 | 14 | −5 | 6 | Qualified from Second Stage |
| 8 | A | Deportivo Camioneros | 7 | 1 | 1 | 5 | 10 | 17 | −7 | 4 | Qualified from Second Stage |
| 9 | B | Boca Unidos | 7 | 1 | 2 | 4 | 5 | 10 | −5 | 5 | Qualified from Second Stage |
| 10 | A | Sol de Mayo | 7 | 0 | 3 | 4 | 7 | 12 | −5 | 3 | Qualified from Second Stage |
| 11 | R | San Martín (F) | 8 | 5 | 2 | 1 | 14 | 6 | +8 | 17 | Qualified from First Phase of Reválida Stage |
| 12 | R | Deportivo Madryn | 8 | 4 | 4 | 0 | 12 | 5 | +7 | 16 | Qualified from First Phase of Reválida Stage |
| 13 | R | Estudiantes (SL) | 8 | 4 | 3 | 1 | 10 | 7 | +3 | 15 | Qualified from First Phase of Reválida Stage |
| 14 | R | Sportivo Las Parejas | 8 | 4 | 2 | 2 | 12 | 8 | +4 | 14 | Qualified from First Phase of Reválida Stage |

Source: AFA

| Team 1 | Agg. | Team 2 | 1st leg | 2nd leg |
|---|---|---|---|---|
| Sansinena | 0–0 (2–3 p) | Sportivo Las Parejas | 0–0 | 0–0 |
| Chaco For Ever | 1–0 | Estudiantes (SL) | 0–0 | 1–0 |
| Villa Mitre | 1–3 | Deportivo Madryn | 0–2 | 1–1 |
| Huracán Las Heras | 2–1 | San Martín (F) | 1–1 | 1–0 |
| Unión (S) | 1–4 | Sol de Mayo | 0–3 | 1–1 |
| Desamparados | 1–1 (4–3 p) | Boca Unidos | 0–0 | 1–1 |
| Deportivo Maipú | 0–0 (4–2 p) | Deportivo Camioneros | 0–0 | 0–0 |

=== Third phase ===
| Pos | Grp | Team | Pld | W | D | L | GF | GA | GD | Pts | Qualification |
|---|---|---|---|---|---|---|---|---|---|---|---|
| 1 | A | Gimnasia y Esgrima (CdU) | 7 | 2 | 5 | 0 | 10 | 7 | +3 | 11 | Qualified from Second Stage |
| 2 | B | Chaco For Ever | 7 | 3 | 2 | 2 | 13 | 12 | +1 | 11 | Qualified from Second Stage |
| 3 | B | Huracán Las Heras | 7 | 3 | 0 | 4 | 6 | 10 | −4 | 9 | Qualified from Second Stage |
| 4 | B | Desamparados | 7 | 2 | 2 | 3 | 4 | 8 | −4 | 8 | Qualified from Second Stage |
| 5 | B | Deportivo Maipú | 7 | 2 | 0 | 5 | 9 | 14 | −5 | 6 | Qualified from Second Stage |
| 6 | A | Sol de Mayo | 7 | 0 | 3 | 4 | 7 | 12 | −5 | 3 | Qualified from Second Stage |
| 7 | R | Deportivo Madryn | 8 | 4 | 4 | 0 | 12 | 5 | +7 | 16 | Qualified from First Phase of Reválida Stage |
| 8 | R | Sportivo Las Parejas | 8 | 4 | 2 | 2 | 12 | 8 | +4 | 14 | Qualified from First Phase of Reválida Stage |

Source: AFA

| Team 1 | Agg. | Team 2 | 1st leg | 2nd leg |
|---|---|---|---|---|
| Gimnasia y Esgrima (CdU) | 1–0 | Sportivo Las Parejas | 0–0 | 1–0 |
| Chaco For Ever | 0–1 | Deportivo Madryn | 0–1 | 0–0 |
| Huracán Las Heras | 1–3 | Sol de Mayo | 0–1 | 1–2 |
| Desamparados | 3–2 | Deportivo Maipú | 0–1 | 3–1 |

=== Fourth to Sixth phase ===
| Pos | Grp | Team | Pld | W | D | L | GF | GA | GD | Pts | Qualification |
|---|---|---|---|---|---|---|---|---|---|---|---|
| 1 | T | Sarmiento (R) | 11 | 6 | 3 | 2 | 18 | 12 | +6 | 21 | Qualified from Third Stage |
| 2 | T | Alvarado | 11 | 4 | 4 | 3 | 14 | 11 | +3 | 16 | Qualified from Third Stage |
| 3 | T | San Jorge (T) | 11 | 4 | 3 | 4 | 19 | 17 | +2 | 15 | Qualified from Third Stage |
| 4 | T | Defensores de Belgrano (VR) | 11 | 3 | 3 | 5 | 12 | 14 | −2 | 12 | Qualified from Third Stage |
| 5 | A | Gimnasia y Esgrima (CdU) | 7 | 2 | 5 | 0 | 10 | 7 | +3 | 11 | Qualified from Second Stage |
| 6 | B | Desamparados | 7 | 2 | 2 | 3 | 4 | 8 | −4 | 8 | Qualified from Second Stage |
| 7 | A | Sol de Mayo | 7 | 0 | 3 | 4 | 7 | 12 | −5 | 3 | Qualified from Second Stage |
| 8 | R | Deportivo Madryn | 8 | 4 | 4 | 0 | 12 | 5 | +7 | 16 | Qualified from First Phase of Reválida Stage |

Source: AFA

==== Fourth phase ====
| Team 1 | Agg. | Team 2 | 1st leg | 2nd leg |
|---|---|---|---|---|
| Sarmiento (R) | 2–4 | Deportivo Madryn | 0–3 | 2–1 |
| Alvarado | 2–1 | Sol de Mayo | 1–1 | 1–0 |
| San Jorge (T) | 6–1 | Desamparados | 3–0 | 3–1 |
| Defensores de Belgrano (VR) | 4–3 | Gimnasia y Esgrima (CdU) | 3–2 | 1–1 |

==== Fifth phase ====
| Team 1 | Agg. | Team 2 | 1st leg | 2nd leg |
|---|---|---|---|---|
| Alvarado | 4–2 | Deportivo Madryn | 0–0 | 4–2 |
| San Jorge (T) | 4–2 | Defensores de Belgrano (VR) | 3–0 | 1–2 |

==== Sixth phase ====
| Team 1 | Agg. | Team 2 | 1st leg | 2nd leg |
|---|---|---|---|---|
| Alvarado | 1–0 | San Jorge (T) | 0–0 | 1–0 |

== Relegation ==
=== Zone A ===
| Pos | Team | First Stage Pts | Reválida Stage Pts | Total Pts | Total Pld | Relegation |
|---|---|---|---|---|---|---|
| 1 | Deportivo Madryn | 22 | 16 | 38 | 24 | |
| 2 | Cipolletti | 19 | 12 | 31 | 24 | |
| 3 | Ferro Carril Oeste (GP) | 16 | 10 | 26 | 24 | |
| 4 | Deportivo Roca | 16 | 8 | 24 | 24 | |
| 5 | Independiente (N) | 10 | 4 | 14 | 24 | Torneo Regional Amateur |

=== Zone B ===
| Pos | Team | First Stage Pts | Reválida Stage Pts | Total Pts | Total Pld | Relegation |
|---|---|---|---|---|---|---|
| 1 | Defensores (P) | 20 | 14 | 34 | 24 | |
| 2 | Sportivo Las Parejas | 18 | 14 | 32 | 24 | |
| 3 | Douglas Haig | 15 | 13 | 28 | 24 | |
| 4 | Juventud Unida (G) | 21 | 6 | 27 | 24 | |
| 5 | Atlético Paraná | 17 | 6 | 23 | 24 | Torneo Regional Amateur |

=== Zone C ===
| Pos | Team | First Stage Pts | Reválida Stage Pts | Total Pts | Total Pld | Relegation |
|---|---|---|---|---|---|---|
| 1 | Estudiantes (SL) | 22 | 15 | 37 | 24 | |
| 2 | Sportivo Belgrano | 18 | 13 | 31 | 24 | |
| 3 | Juventud Unida Universitario | 16 | 10 | 26 | 24 | |
| 4 | Racing (C) | 13 | 11 | 24 | 24 | |
| 5 | San Lorenzo | 19 | 3 | 22 | 24 | Torneo Regional Amateur |

=== Zone D ===
| Pos | Team | First Stage Pts | Reválida Stage Pts | Total Pts | Total Pld | Relegation |
|---|---|---|---|---|---|---|
| 1 | Crucero del Norte | 24 | 10 | 34 | 24 | |
| 2 | Juventud Antoniana | 14 | 11 | 25 | 24 | |
| 3 | San Martín (F) | 8 | 17 | 25 | 24 | |
| 4 | Gimnasia y Tiro | 17 | 8 | 25 | 24 | |
| 5 | Altos Hornos Zapla | 12 | 9 | 21 | 24 | Torneo Regional Amateur |

=== General table ===
| Pos | Team | First Stage Pts | Reválida Stage Pts | Total Pts | Total Pld | Relegation |
|---|---|---|---|---|---|---|
| 1 | Deportivo Madryn | 22 | 16 | 38 | 24 | |
| 2 | Estudiantes (SL) | 22 | 15 | 37 | 24 | |
| 3 | Crucero del Norte | 24 | 10 | 34 | 24 | |
| 4 | Defensores (P) | 20 | 14 | 34 | 24 | |
| 5 | Sportivo Las Parejas | 18 | 14 | 32 | 24 | |
| 6 | Cipolletti | 19 | 12 | 31 | 24 | |
| 7 | Sportivo Belgrano | 18 | 13 | 31 | 24 | |
| 8 | Douglas Haig | 15 | 13 | 28 | 24 | |
| 9 | Juventud Unida (G) | 21 | 6 | 27 | 24 | |
| 10 | Ferro Carril Oeste (GP) | 16 | 10 | 26 | 24 | |
| 11 | Juventud Unida Universitario | 16 | 10 | 26 | 24 | |
| 12 | Juventud Antoniana | 14 | 11 | 25 | 24 | Torneo Regional Amateur relegation triangular |
| 13 | San Martín (F) | 8 | 17 | 25 | 24 | Torneo Regional Amateur relegation triangular |
| 14 | Gimnasia y Tiro | 17 | 8 | 25 | 24 | Torneo Regional Amateur relegation triangular |
| 15 | Racing (C) | 13 | 11 | 24 | 24 | Torneo Regional Amateur |
| 16 | Deportivo Roca | 16 | 8 | 24 | 24 | Torneo Regional Amateur |

==== Relegation Triangular ====
All matches were played in Córdoba.

| Pos | Team | Pld | W | D | L | GF | GA | GD | Pts | Relegation |
|---|---|---|---|---|---|---|---|---|---|---|
| 1 | San Martín (F) | 2 | 0 | 2 | 0 | 3 | 3 | 0 | 2 | |
| 2 | Gimnasia y Tiro | 2 | 0 | 2 | 0 | 2 | 2 | 0 | 2 | Torneo Regional Amateur |
| 3 | Juventud Antoniana | 2 | 0 | 2 | 0 | 1 | 1 | 0 | 2 | Torneo Regional Amateur |

Updated to match(es) played on April 11, 2019. Source: AFA
Rules for classification: 1) points; 2) goal difference; 2) goals scored; 3) Better points or head-to-head goals between teams, adding First Stage and Reválida Stage: San Martín (F) 13 pts, +5 goal difference; Juventud Antoniana 8 pts, −1 goal difference; Gimnasia y Tiro 8 pts, −4 goal difference.

===== Results =====
| Home \ Away | GYT | JUA | SAF |
|---|---|---|---|
| Gimnasia y Tiro | | | |
| Juventud Antoniana | 0–0 | | 1–1 |
| San Martín (F) | 2–2 | | |

Updated to match(es) played on unknown. Source: AFA
Legend: Blue = home team win; Yellow = draw; Red = away team win.

== Season statistics ==
=== Top scorers ===
As of June 28, 2019

| Rank | Player | Club | Goals |
|---|---|---|---|
| 1 | (Argentina) Franco Olego | Defensores de Belgrano (VR) | 20 |
| 2 | (Argentina) Carlos Herrera | Villa Mitre | 12 |
| 2 | (Argentina) Luis Silba | Sarmiento (R) | 12 |
| 3 | (Argentina) Milton Zárate | Chaco For Ever | 11 |
| 3 | (Argentina) Ricardo Tapia | San Jorge (T) | 11 |

== See also ==
- 2018–19 Argentine Primera División
- 2019 Copa de la Superliga
- 2018–19 Primera B Nacional
- 2018–19 Primera B Metropolitana
- 2018–19 Copa Argentina
