= Alejandro Sánchez (footballer, born 1986) =

Argentine footballer

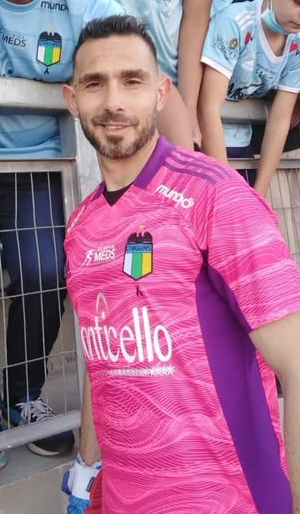
- Alejandro Sánchez

Personal information
- Full name: Alejandro Miguel Sánchez
- Date of birth: 25 October 1986 (age 40)
- Place of birth: Buenos Aires, Argentina
- Height: 1.89 m (6 ft 2 in)
- Position: Goalkeeper

Team information
- Current team: Deportivo Rincón

Youth career
- Platense

Senior career*
Years	Team	Apps	(Gls)
2004–2011	Platense	58	(0)
2011–2014	Audax Italiano	99	(0)
2013–2014	Audax Italiano B	6	(0)
2014–2017	Nueva Chicago	91	(0)
2017–2020	Atlético Tucumán	18	(0)
2020–2021	Central Córdoba SdE	16	(0)
2021	O'Higgins	12	(0)
2022	Deportes Iquique	12	(0)
2022–2023	Platense	0	(0)
2024	Atlanta	29	(0)
2025	Defensores Unidos	13	(0)
2025–	Deportivo Rincón	3	(0)
- * Club domestic league appearances and goals as of 16:33, 30 July 2025 (UTC)

Alejandro Miguel Sánchez (born 25 October 1986) is an Argentine professional footballer who plays as a goalkeeper for Deportivo Rincón.
