= San Jorge de Tucumán =

San Jorge
- Full name: Club Social y Deportivo San Jorge
- Nickname: Expreso
- Founded: 17 July 2008; 17 years ago
- Ground: Senador Luis Cruz, San Miguel de Tucumán, Tucumán Province
- Capacity: 7,000
- Chairman: Marcelo Sáez
- Manager: Osvaldo Bernasconi
- League: Torneo Argentino B
- 2011–12: 2nd (Promoted to Torneo Argentino A)
Home colours	Away colours

Club Social y Deportivo San Jorge is an Argentine football club based in the city of San Miguel de Tucumán of Tucumán Province. The team currently plays in Torneo Argentino A, the regionalised third division of the Argentine football league system.

San Jorge is one of the youngest clubs of Argentina, having achieved some success in local football. In 2011 the club debuted in Torneo Argentino B where finished 2nd. on first stage. The team eliminated teams such as Chaco For Ever (which defeated 3–0 in Chaco), 9 de Julio de Morteros reaching the finals against Guaraní Antonio Franco. San Jorge was defeated so the team went to playoffs against a team from Torneo Argentino A.

San Jorge faced Comodoro Rivadavia's team Comisión de Actividades Infantiles, winning the decisive match 3–1 as visitor therefore promoting to Argentino A.

On 23 June 2019, during the 2018–19 Torneo Federal A promotion play-off final second leg against Alvarado, San Jorge refused to finish the match in protest at the refereeing. Their players sat down on fifty minutes, before eventually walking off which led to the fixture being abandoned - which gave Alvarado promotion to Primera B Nacional.

== Players ==
=== Current squad ===
Note: Flags indicate national team as defined under FIFA eligibility rules; some limited exceptions apply. Players may hold more than one non-FIFA nationality.

No.	Pos.	Nation	Player
—	GK	ARG	José Fernández
—	GK	ARG	Damián Rocchia
—	DF	ARG	Diego Véliz
—	DF	ARG	Franco Zambrano
—	DF	ARG	Exequiel Narese
—	DF	ARG	Aníbal Medina
—	DF	ARG	Juan Cabrera
—	DF	ARG	Ariel Barrionuevo

No.	Pos.	Nation	Player
—	MF	ARG	Matías Fernández
—	MF	ARG	Carlos Aldonate
—	MF	ARG	Guillermo Acosta
—	FW	ARG	Juan Paz
—	FW	ARG	Abel Olmos
—	FW	ARG	Leonardo Pérez
—	FW	ARG	Martín Martinez
