= 2017–18 Copa Argentina =

Tournament details
- Country: Argentina
- Teams: 100

Final positions
- Champions: Rosario Central (1st title)
- Runners-up: Gimnasia y Esgrima (LP)
- 2019 Copa Libertadores: Rosario Central

Tournament statistics
- Matches played: 135
- Goals scored: 311 (2.3 per match)
- Top goal scorer(s): Héctor Rueda; Luis Silba (5 goals each)

Awards
- Best player: Jeremías Ledesma

The 2017–18 Copa Argentina (officially the Copa Total Argentina 2017–18 for sponsorship reasons) was the ninth edition of the Copa Argentina, and the seventh since the relaunch of the tournament in 2011. The competition began on 19 January 2018 and ended on 6 December 2018.

Rosario Central defeated Gimnasia y Esgrima (LP) on penalties in the final to win their first title. As champions, Rosario Central qualified for 2018 Supercopa Argentina and 2019 Copa Libertadores.

River Plate, the defending champions, were eliminated by Gimnasia y Esgrima (LP) in the semifinals.

== Teams ==
The 100 teams that took part in this competition were: all teams from the Primera División (28); twelve teams of the Primera B Nacional; five from the Primera B, four from the Primera C; three from the Primera D; thirty-two teams from Federal A and sixteen from Federal B.

=== First Level ===
==== Primera División ====
All twenty-eight teams qualified.

- Argentinos Juniors
- Arsenal
- Atlético Tucumán
- Banfield
- Belgrano
- Boca Juniors
- Chacarita Juniors
- Colón
- Defensa y Justicia
- Estudiantes (LP)
- Gimnasia y Esgrima (LP)
- Godoy Cruz
- Huracán
- Independiente
- Lanús
- Newell's Old Boys
- Olimpo
- Patronato
- Racing
- River Plate^{TH}
- Rosario Central
- San Lorenzo
- San Martín (SJ)
- Talleres (C)
- Temperley
- Tigre
- Unión
- Vélez Sarsfield

=== Second Level ===
==== Primera B Nacional ====
The best twelve teams at the 13th round of 2017-18 tournament qualified.

- Agropecuario Argentino
- Aldosivi
- Almagro
- Atlético de Rafaela
- Brown
- Deportivo Morón
- Gimnasia y Esgrima (J)
- Guillermo Brown
- Juventud Unida (G)
- Mitre (SdE)
- San Martín (T)
- Villa Dálmine

=== Third Level ===
==== Primera B Metropolitana ====
The top-five teams at the 17th round of 2017-18 Primera B tournament qualified.

- Defensores de Belgrano
- Estudiantes (BA)
- Platense
- Tristán Suárez
- UAI Urquiza

==== Torneo Federal A ====
The first eight teams of each zone of the 2017–18 tournament qualified.

- Altos Hornos Zapla
- Alvarado
- Central Córdoba (SdE)
- Chaco For Ever
- Cipolletti
- Crucero del Norte
- Defensores (P)
- Defensores de Belgrano (VR)
- Deportivo Maipú
- Deportivo Roca
- Desamparados
- Douglas Haig
- Estudiantes (RC)
- Ferro Carril Oeste (GP)
- Gimnasia y Esgrima (CdU)
- Gimnasia y Esgrima (M)
- Gimnasia y Tiro
- Huracán Las Heras
- Independiente (N)
- Juventud Antoniana
- Juventud Unida Universitario
- Rivadavia (L)
- San Jorge (T)
- San Lorenzo (A)
- Sansinena
- Sarmiento (R)
- Sportivo Belgrano
- Sportivo Las Parejas
- Sportivo Patria
- Unión (S)
- Unión (VK)
- Villa Mitre

=== Fourth Level ===
==== Primera C Metropolitana ====
The top-four teams at the 19th round of 2017-18 Primera C tournament qualified.

- Central Córdoba (R)
- Defensores Unidos
- Luján
- Midland

==== Torneo Federal B ====
The top-four teams of each zone of the 2017-18 Federal B tournament qualified.

- Atlético Pellegrini
- Central Norte
- Deportivo Achirense
- Deportivo Camioneros
- Deportivo Rincón
- Ferro Carril Sud
- Huracán (SR)
- Independiente (Ch)
- Racing (C)
- Racing (O)
- San Jorge
- San Martín (F)
- Sarmiento (L)
- Sol de América
- Sol de Mayo
- Sportivo Peñarol (Ch)

=== Fifth Level ===
==== Primera D Metropolitana ====
The top-three teams at the 15th round of 2017-18 Primera D tournament qualified.

- Central Ballester
- General Lamadrid
- Victoriano Arenas

== Regional Round ==
This round was organized by the Consejo Federal.

=== Group A: Federal A ===
==== Round I ====
In the Round I, 32 teams from the Torneo Federal A participated. The round was played between 19 and 24 January, on a home-and-away two-legged tie. The 16 winning teams advanced to the Round II.

Team 1	Agg.	Team 2	1st leg	2nd leg
Cipolletti	1–1 (4–3 p)	Deportivo Roca	1–0	0–1
Independiente (N)	1–1 (4–2 p)	Ferro Carril Oeste (GP)	1–0	0–1
Sansinena	4–0	Villa Mitre	4–0	0–0
Rivadavia (L)	1–2	Alvarado	1–0	0–2
Juventud Unida Universitario	1–5	Gimnasia y Esgrima (M)	0–2	1–3
Huracán Las Heras	0–2	Deportivo Maipú	0–0	0–2
Unión (VK)	4–2	Desamparados	2–0	2–2
San Lorenzo (A)	1–4	Central Córdoba (SdE)	0–1	1–3
Sportivo Belgrano	2–1	Estudiantes (RC)	2–1	0–0
Sportivo Las Parejas	1–5	Unión (S)	1–4	0–1
Defensores (P)	4–2	Gimnasia y Esgrima (CdU)	1–2	3–0
Douglas Haig	1–1 (a)	Defensores de Belgrano (VR)	0–0	1–1
Chaco For Ever	1–2	Sarmiento (R)	1–1	0–1
Sportivo Patria	2–5	Crucero del Norte	2–2	0–3
Juventud Antoniana	2–0	Gimnasia y Tiro	0–0	2–0
San Jorge (T)	3–0	Altos Hornos Zapla	1–0	2–0

===== First leg =====
January 19, 2018	Cipolletti	1–0	Deportivo Roca	Cipolletti, Pcia. de Río Negro
21:30	Weiner 80'	Report		Stadium: La Visera de Cemento; Referee: Javier Obreque

January 19, 2018	Independiente (N)	1–0	Ferro Carril Oeste (GP)	Neuquén, Pcia. de Neuquén
21:30	Petretto 54'	Report		Stadium: Monumental de Saavedra; Referee: Pablo Leguizamón

January 19, 2018	Sansinena	4–0	Villa Mitre	General Daniel Cerri, Pcia. de Buenos Aires
18:00	Filippini 6'; Ihitz 15'; Bárez 64'; Bowen 82'	Report		Stadium: Luis Molina; Referee: Sergio Testa

January 19, 2018	Rivadavia (L)	1–0	Alvarado	Lincoln, Pcia. de Buenos Aires
21:30	Assandri 20'	Report		Stadium: El Coliseo; Referee: Nahuel Viñas

January 19, 2018	Juventud Unida Universitario	0–2	Gimnasia y Esgrima (M)	San Luis, Pcia. de San Luis
18:00		Report	Palacios Alvarenga 5', 45+1'	Stadium: Mario Sebastián Diez; Referee: Franco Morón

January 20, 2018	Huracán Las Heras	0–0	Deportivo Maipú	Las Heras, Pcia. de Mendoza
18:00		Report		Stadium: Nicolás Blázquez; Referee: Luis Martínez

January 19, 2018	Unión (VK)	2–0	Desamparados	Villa Krause, Pcia. de San Juan
21:30	Villegas 35'; Terzaghi 87'	Report		Stadium: 12 de Octubre; Referee: Alejandro Mendoza

January 19, 2018	San Lorenzo (A)	0–1	Central Córdoba (SdE)	San Fernando del Valle de Catamarca, Pcia. de Catamarca
21:00		Report	Ortega 37'	Stadium: Malvinas Argentinas; Referee: Federico Guaymás Tornero

January 19, 2018	Sportivo Belgrano	2–1	Estudiantes (RC)	San Francisco, Pcia. de Córdoba
21:00	Catube 27'; Muller 69'	Report	Cainelli 36'	Stadium: Oscar C. Boero; Referee: Sebastián Mastrángelo

January 19, 2018	Sportivo Las Parejas	1–4	Unión (S)	Las Parejas, Pcia. de Santa Fe
20:30	Bocchietti 40'	Report	Gaitán 5'; Cabral 50', 59', 85'	Stadium: La Fortaleza del Lobo; Referee: Adrián Franklin

January 19, 2018	Defensores (P)	1–2	Gimnasia y Esgrima (CdU)	Pronunciamiento, Pcia. de Entre Ríos
21:00	Chitero 23'	Report	Leguizamón 52'; Vílchez 75'	Stadium: Delio Esteban Cardozo; Referee: Federico Guaymás Tornero

January 19, 2018	Douglas Haig	0–0	Defensores de Belgrano (VR)	Pergamino, Pcia. de Buenos Aires
21:00		Report		Stadium: Miguel Morales; Referee: Federico Presa

January 21, 2018	Chaco For Ever	1–1	Sarmiento (R)	Resistencia, Pcia. de Chaco
17:00	Rodríguez 12'	Report	Silba 79'	Stadium: Juan Alberto García; Referee: Luis Lobo Medina

January 20, 2018	Sportivo Patria	2–2	Crucero del Norte	Formosa, Pcia. de Formosa
17:00	Troche 28'; Francisco de Souza 42'	Report	Rivas 15'; Brítez 86'	Stadium: Antonio Romero; Referee: Carlos Córdoba

January 21, 2018	Juventud Antoniana	0–0	Gimnasia y Tiro	Salta, Pcia. de Salta
17:00		Report		Stadium: Padre Ernesto Martearena; Referee: Gustavo Benítes

January 19, 2018	San Jorge (T)	1–0	Altos Hornos Zapla	San Miguel de Tucumán, Pcia. de Tucumán
17:30	Cabrera 79' (pen.)	Report		Stadium: Monumental José Fierro; Referee: Francisco Acosta

===== Second leg =====
January 23, 2018	Deportivo Roca	1–0 (1–1 agg.) (3–4 p)	Cipolletti	General Roca, Pcia. de Río Negro
21:30	Mannara 40'	Report		Stadium: Luis Maiolino; Referee: Luciano Julio
	Penalties
	Aguirre (penalty scored); Valenzuela (penalty missed); Lincopán (penalty scored); Prioreschi (penalty scored); Trecco (penalty missed)		(penalty missed) Vilce; (penalty scored) E. Morales; (penalty scored) Piñero da Silva; (penalty scored) Sosa; (penalty scored) Valente

January 23, 2018	Ferro Carril Oeste (GP)	1–0 (1–1 agg.) (2–4 p)	Independiente (N)	General Pico, Pcia. de La Pampa
21:30	Mellado 52'	Report		Stadium: El Coloso de Barrio Talleres; Referee: Darío Rojas
	Penalties
	Rancez (penalty missed); Sain (penalty scored); Mellado (penalty scored); Taborda (penalty missed)		(penalty scored) Porra; (penalty scored) Berra; (penalty scored) Solís; (penalty scored) Cataldi

January 23, 2018	Villa Mitre	0–0 (0–4 agg.)	Sansinena	Bahía Blanca, Pcia. de Buenos Aires
21:00		Report		Stadium: El Fortín; Referee: Bruno Bocca

January 23, 2018	Alvarado	2–0 (2–1 agg.)	Rivadavia (L)	Mar del Plata, Pcia. de Buenos Aires
21:00	Litre 30'; Susvielles 80'	Report		Stadium: José María Minella; Referee: Fernando Omar Marcos

January 23, 2018	Gimnasia y Esgrima (M)	3–1 (5–1 agg.)	Juventud Unida Universitario	Mendoza, Pcia. de Mendoza
21:30	Becerra 30'; Marín 63'; Palacios Alvarenga 82' (pen.)	Report	Hómola 47'	Stadium: Víctor Antonio Legrotaglie; Referee: Jonathan Correa

January 23, 2018	Deportivo Maipú	2–0 (2–0 agg.)	Huracán Las Heras	Maipú, Pcia. de Mendoza
21:30	S. González 15'; García 47' (pen.)	Report		Stadium: Omar Higinio Sperdutti; Referee: Alejandro Arco

January 23, 2018	Desamparados	2–2 (2–4 agg.)	Unión (VK)	San Juan, Pcia. de San Juan
21:45	González 54'; Fondacaro 77'	Report	García 4'; Terrero 8'	Stadium: El Serpentario; Referee: Mario Ejarque

January 23, 2018	Central Córdoba (SdE)	3–1 (4–1 agg.)	San Lorenzo (A)	Santiago del Estero, Pcia. de Santiago del Estero
22:00	Vella 49', 55', 73'	Report	Solohaga 32'	Stadium: Alfredo Terrera; Referee: Luis Lobo Medina

January 23, 2018	Estudiantes (RC)	0–0 (1–2 agg.)	Sportivo Belgrano	Río Cuarto, Pcia. de Córdoba
21:30		Report		Stadium: Ciudad de Río Cuarto; Referee: Fabricio Llobet

January 23, 2018	Unión (S)	1–0 (5–1 agg.)	Sportivo Las Parejas	Sunchales, Pcia. de Santa Fe
21:00	Vitarelli Góngora 54'	Report		Stadium: La Fortaleza del Bicho; Referee: Nazareno Arasa

January 23, 2018	Gimnasia y Esgrima (CdU)	0–3 (2–4 agg.)	Defensores (P)	Concepción del Uruguay, Pcia. de Entre Ríos
21:15		Report	Chitero 33', 45+1'; Reyes 85'	Stadium: Manuel y Ramón Núñez; Referee: Gerardo Cedro Méndez

January 23, 2018	Defensores de Belgrano (VR)	1–1 (1–1 agg.)	Douglas Haig	Villa Ramallo, Pcia. de Buenos Aires
21:00	Bonetto 26'	Report	Martínez 90+3'	Stadium: Salomón Boeseldín; Referee: Lucas Novelli Sanz

January 24, 2018	Sarmiento (R)	1–0 (2–1 agg.)	Chaco For Ever	Resistencia, Pcia. de Chaco
21:30	Parera 90+3'	Report		Stadium: Centenario; Referee: Sebastián Ranciglio

January 23, 2018	Crucero del Norte	3–0 (5–2 agg.)	Sportivo Patria	Garupá, Pcia. de Misiones
21:00	Sotelo 11'; Cardozo 23'; Marinucci 45'	Report		Stadium: Comandante Andrés Guacurarí; Referee: Guillermo González

January 24, 2018	Gimnasia y Tiro	0–2 (0–2 agg.)	Juventud Antoniana	Salta, Pcia. de Salta
22:00		Report	Ibáñez 70' (pen.); Acosta 90+2'	Stadium: Gigante del Norte; Referee: Federico Guaymás Tornero

January 23, 2018	Altos Hornos Zapla	0–2 (0–3 agg.)	San Jorge (T)	San Salvador de Jujuy, Pcia. de Jujuy
22:00		Report	Ontivero 28', 63'	Stadium: 23 de Agosto; Referee: Maximiliano Silcan

==== Round II ====
In the Round II, 16 qualified teams from the Round I participated. The round was played between 27 January and 21 February, on a home-and-away two-legged tie with best team in the Torneo Federal A hosting the second leg. The 8 winning teams advanced to the Final Round.

Team 1	Agg.	Team 2	1st leg	2nd leg
Independiente (N)	0–6	Cipolletti	0–5	0–1
Sansinena	0–1	Alvarado	0–0	0–1
Deportivo Maipú	3–3 (a)	Gimnasia y Esgrima (M)	1–0	2–3
Unión (VK)	2–3	Central Córdoba (SdE)	0–2	2–1
Unión (S)	1–2	Sportivo Belgrano	1–0	0–2
Defensores (P)	2–4	Douglas Haig	1–2	1–2
Crucero del Norte	2–3	Sarmiento (R)	2–2	0–1
San Jorge (T)	3–5	Juventud Antoniana	2–3	1–2

===== First leg =====
January 27, 2018	Independiente (N)	0–5	Cipolletti	Neuquén, Pcia. de Neuquén
17:30		Report	Piñero da Silva 38', 59', 80'; Sosa 50'; Carrera 88'	Stadium: La Chacra; Referee: Sergio Testa

January 27, 2018	Sansinena	0–0	Alvarado	General Daniel Cerri, Pcia. de Buenos Aires
17:30		Report		Stadium: Luis Molina; Referee: Lucas Novelli Sanz

January 28, 2018	Deportivo Maipú	1–0	Gimnasia y Esgrima (M)	Maipú, Pcia. de Mendoza
18:30	García 56'	Report		Stadium: Omar Higinio Sperdutti; Referee: Luis Lobo Medina

January 27, 2018	Unión (VK)	0–2	Central Córdoba (SdE)	Villa Krause, Pcia. de San Juan
21:30		Report	Palacios Hurtado 11' (pen.), 72'	Stadium: 12 de Octubre; Referee: Jonathan Correa

January 27, 2018	Unión (S)	1–0	Sportivo Belgrano	Sunchales, Pcia. de Santa Fe
19:30	Sola 2'	Report		Stadium: La Fortaleza del Bicho; Referee: Nahuel Viñas

January 27, 2018	Defensores (P)	1–2	Douglas Haig	Pronunciamiento, Pcia. de Entre Ríos
19:00	Flores 52' (o.g.)	Report	González 34'; Duma 86'	Stadium: Delio Esteban Cardozo; Referee: Adrián Franklin

January 27, 2018	Crucero del Norte	2–2	Sarmiento (R)	Garupá, Pcia. de Misiones
21:00	Bruno 1'; Cardozo 60' (pen.)	Report	Silba 29'; Parera 62'	Stadium: Comandante Andrés Guacurarí; Referee: Carlos Boxler

February 7, 2018	San Jorge (T)	2–3	Juventud Antoniana	San Miguel de Tucumán, Pcia. de Tucumán
17:00	Vega 5'; Zambrana 50'	Report	Menéndez 3'; Acosta 17'; Espíndola 58'	Stadium: Ángel Pascual Sáez; Referee: Rodrigo Rivero

===== Second leg =====
January 30, 2018	Cipolletti	1–0 (6–0 agg.)	Independiente (N)	Cipolletti, Pcia. de Río Negro
21:30	Morán 82'	Report		Stadium: La Visera de Cemento; Referee: Bruno Bocca

January 30, 2018	Alvarado	1–0 (1–0 agg.)	Sansinena	Mar del Plata, Pcia. de Buenos Aires
21:00	Gautier 81'	Report		Stadium: José María Minella; Referee: Gerardo Cedro Méndez

February 21, 2018	Gimnasia y Esgrima (M)	3–2 (3–3 agg.)	Deportivo Maipú	Mendoza, Pcia. de Mendoza
21:30	Cucchi 8'; Briones 68'; Palacios Alvarenga 89'	Report	S. González 65'; Vuanello 90+3'	Stadium: Víctor Antonio Legrotaglie; Referee: Fabricio Llobet

February 6, 2018	Central Córdoba (SdE)	1–2 (3–2 agg.)	Unión (VK)	Santiago del Estero, Pcia. de Santiago del Estero
22:00	Salvatierra 28'	Report	Terzaghi 33'; Méndez 44'	Stadium: Alfredo Terrera; Referee: Carlos Boxler

February 13, 2018	Sportivo Belgrano	2–0 (2–1 agg.)	Unión (S)	San Francisco, Pcia. de Córdoba
20:15	Aróstegui 73' (pen.), 90+4'	Report		Stadium: Oscar C. Boero; Referee: Nazareno Arasa

January 30, 2018	Douglas Haig	2–1 (4–2 agg.)	Defensores (P)	Pergamino, Pcia. de Buenos Aires
21:00	González 58'; Cabello 90+2'	Report	Estigarribia 88'	Stadium: Miguel Morales; Referee: Sebastián Mastrángelo

February 7, 2018	Sarmiento (R)	1–0 (3–2 agg.)	Crucero del Norte	Resistencia, Pcia. de Chaco
21:30	Villar 55'	Report		Stadium: Centenario; Referee: Fabricio Llobet

February 21, 2018	Juventud Antoniana	2–1 (5–3 agg.)	San Jorge (T)	Salta, Pcia. de Salta
22:15	Pérez 7'; Angulo 67'	Report	Pérez 64' (o.g.)	Stadium: Padre Ernesto Martearena; Referee: Nicolás Sosa

=== Group B: Federal B ===
==== Round I ====
In the Round I, 16 teams from the Torneo Federal B participated. The round was played between 26 January and 17 March, on a home-and-away two-legged tie. The 8 winning teams advanced to the Round II.

Team 1	Agg.	Team 2	1st leg	2nd leg
Deportivo Rincón	5–3	Sol de Mayo	5–1	0–2
Racing (O)	0–4	Ferro Carril Sud	0–1	0–3
Independiente (Ch)	2–0	Deportivo Camioneros	2–0	0–0
Deportivo Achirense	2–3	San Jorge	2–3	0–0
Sarmiento (L)	4–4 (a)	Racing (C)	2–4	2–0
Sportivo Peñarol (Ch)	6–3	Huracán (SR)	4–1	2–2
Sol de América	2–2 (5–4 p)	San Martín (F)	1–1	1–1
Atlético Pellegrini	0–4	Central Norte	0–2	0–2

===== First leg =====
January 28, 2018	Deportivo Rincón	5–1	Sol de Mayo	Rincón de Los Sauces, Pcia. de Neuquén
17:00	Muñoz 8'; Rueda 21', 39', 53'; Sack 90+2'	Report	Olivera 48'	Stadium: Deportivo Rincón; Referee: Pablo Leguizamón

January 26, 2018	Racing (O)	0–1	Ferro Carril Sud	Olavarría, Pcia. de Buenos Aires
21:00		Report	Benítez 9'	Stadium: José Buglione; Referee: Bruno Amiconi

March 10, 2018	Independiente (Ch)	2–0	Deportivo Camioneros	Chivilcoy, Pcia. de Buenos Aires
17:00	Treppo 18'; Slimmens 47'	Report		Stadium: Raúl Orlando Lungarzo; Referee: Joaquín Gil

January 28, 2018	Deportivo Achirense	2–3	San Jorge	Colonia Las Achiras, Pcia. de Entre Ríos
18:30	Soto 21'; Restano 55'	Report	Tarasco 25'; Femenia 70', 81'	Stadium: Guillermo Bonnín; Referee: Alfredo Zamora

January 28, 2018	Sarmiento (L)	2–4	Racing (C)	Leones, Pcia. de Córdoba
20:00	Cardozo 1'; Cedrón 65' (pen.)	Report	Ocampo 11'; Olocco 78'; García 90'; M. Martínez 90+3'	Stadium: La Calderita; Referee: Matías González

January 28, 2018	Sportivo Peñarol (Ch)	4–1	Huracán (SR)	Chimbas, Pcia. de San Juan
18:00	Bastías 22'; Ceballos 46'; Chávez 83'; Cantero 86'	Report	Cascón 20'	Stadium: Ramón Pablo Rojas; Referee: Marcos Romera

January 28, 2018	Sol de América	1–1	San Martín (F)	Formosa, Pcia. de Formosa
17:00	Filipigh 62'	Report	Velázquez 47'	Stadium: La Fortaleza; Referee: Victor Vallejos

January 26, 2018	Atlético Pellegrini	0–2	Central Norte	Salta, Pcia. de Salta
22:00		Report	Arellano 87'; Char 89'	Stadium: Liga Salteña de Fútbol; Referee: Matías Alfaro

===== Second leg =====
February 4, 2018	Sol de Mayo	2–0 (3–5 agg.)	Deportivo Rincón	Viedma, Pcia. de Río Negro
17:30	Hueche 36'; Malacarne 80'	Report		Stadium: Sol de Mayo; Referee: Fernando Omar Marcos

February 5, 2018	Ferro Carril Sud	3–0 (4–0 agg.)	Racing (O)	Olavarría, Pcia. de Buenos Aires
21:00	Vivas 5'; Campos 20'; Schwindt 35'	Report		Stadium: Domingo Colasurdo; Referee: Jerónimo Gallo

March 17, 2018	Deportivo Camioneros	0–0 (0–2 agg.)	Independiente (Ch)	Nueve de Abril, Pcia. de Buenos Aires
17:00		Report		Stadium: Hugo Moyano; Referee: César Ceballos

February 4, 2018	San Jorge	0–0 (3–2 agg.)	Deportivo Achirense	San Jorge, Pcia. de Santa Fe
18:00		Report		Stadium: Parque 23 de Junio; Referee: Roberto Franco

February 2, 2018	Racing (C)	0–2 (4–4 agg.)	Sarmiento (L)	Córdoba, Pcia. de Córdoba
21:00		Report	Bersano 40'; Cedrón 45'	Stadium: Miguel Sancho; Referee: Gastón Monzón Brizuela

February 3, 2018	Huracán (SR)	2–2 (3–6 agg.)	Sportivo Peñarol (Ch)	San Rafael, Pcia. de Mendoza
18:00	Escandar 35'; Cascón 79' (pen.)	Report	Ceballos 48'; González 54'	Stadium: Deportivo Argentino; Referee: Federico Drubi

February 4, 2018	San Martín (F)	1–1 (2–2 agg.) (4–5 p)	Sol de América	Formosa, Pcia. de Formosa
17:00	Agüero 60'	Report	Pietkiewicz 35'	Stadium: San Martín; Referee: Fernando Brillada
	Penalties
	Núñez (penalty scored); Asatt (penalty scored); Velázquez (penalty scored); Benítez (penalty scored); Agüero (penalty missed)		(penalty scored) Álvarez; (penalty scored) Alarcón; (penalty scored) Romero; (penalty scored) Pietkiewicz; (penalty scored) R. Riquelme

February 3, 2018	Central Norte	2–0 (4–0 agg.)	Atlético Pellegrini	Salta, Pcia. de Salta
17:00	Apaza 23', 55'	Report		Stadium: Doctor Luis Güemes; Referee: Javier Bustelo

==== Round II ====
In the Round II, 8 qualified teams from the Round I participated. The round was played between 10 February and 31 March, on a home-and-away two-legged tie with best team in the Torneo Federal B hosting the second leg. The 4 winning teams advanced to the Final Round.

Team 1	Agg.	Team 2	1st leg	2nd leg
Deportivo Rincón	5–1	Ferro Carril Sud	4–0	1–1
Independiente (Ch)	3–1	San Jorge	2–1	1–0
Sportivo Peñarol (Ch)	2–4	Racing (C)	2–1	0–3
Sol de América	4–4 (3–4 p)	Central Norte	2–2	2–2

===== First leg =====
February 17, 2018	Deportivo Rincón	4–0	Ferro Carril Sud	Rincón de Los Sauces, Pcia. de Neuquén
17:00	Rueda 38', 70'; Ibáñez 46'; Muñoz 81'	Report		Stadium: Deportivo Rincón; Referee: Pablo Leguizamón

March 24, 2018	Independiente (Ch)	2–1	San Jorge	Chivilcoy, Pcia. de Buenos Aires
16:00	Salvaggio 29'; Slimmens 41'	Report	Cuberli 15'	Stadium: Raúl Orlando Lungarzo; Referee: Sergio Méndez

February 11, 2018	Sportivo Peñarol (Ch)	2–1	Racing (C)	Chimbas, Pcia. de San Juan
18:15	Bastías 26'; Chávez 62'	Report	Álvarez 47'	Stadium: Ramón Pablo Rojas; Referee: Gabriel Araujo

February 10, 2018	Sol de América	2–2	Central Norte	Formosa, Pcia. de Formosa
17:00	Medina Aguayo 4'; Villalba 32'	Report	Apaza 12'; Ceballos 18'	Stadium: La Fortaleza; Referee: Rodrigo López

===== Second leg =====
February 21, 2018	Ferro Carril Sud	1–1 (1–5 agg.)	Deportivo Rincón	Olavarría, Pcia. de Buenos Aires
21:15	Vivas 14'	Report	Muñoz 37'	Stadium: Domingo Colasurdo; Referee: Marcelo Sanz

March 31, 2018	San Jorge	0–1 (1–3 agg.)	Independiente (Ch)	San Jorge, Pcia. de Santa Fe
17:00		Report	Salvaggio 42' (pen.)	Stadium: Parque 23 de Junio; Referee: Carlos Gariano

February 18, 2018	Racing (C)	3–0 (4–2 agg.)	Sportivo Peñarol (Ch)	Córdoba, Pcia. de Córdoba
18:00	R. López 30', 90+3' (pen.); García 90+2'	Report		Stadium: Miguel Sancho; Referee: Maximiliano Macheroni

February 16, 2018	Central Norte	2–2 (4–4 agg.) (4–3 p)	Sol de América	Salta, Pcia. de Salta
22:00	Char 25'; Armella 77'	Report	R. Riquelme 30'; Caballero 38'	Stadium: Padre Ernesto Martearena; Referee: Diego Rodríguez Fernández
	Penalties
	Zamarián (penalty scored); Vargas (penalty missed); Ceballos (penalty scored); Apaza (penalty scored); Benítez (penalty scored)		(penalty scored) Romero; (penalty scored) Alarcón; (penalty scored) Villalba; (penalty missed) Caballero; (penalty missed) M. Riquelme

== Final Rounds ==
=== Draw ===
The draw for the Final Rounds was held on 6 March 2018, 12:00 at AFA Futsal Stadium in Ezeiza. The 64 qualified teams were divided in four groups with 16 teams each. Teams were seeded by their historical performance and Division. Champions of AFA tournaments were allocated to Group A. The matches were drawn from the respective confronts: A vs. C; B vs. D. Some combinations were avoided for security reasons.

Group A	Group B	Group C	Group D
Argentinos Juniors; Arsenal; Banfield; Boca Juniors; Chacarita Juniors; Estudiantes (LP); Gimnasia y Esgrima (LP); Huracán; Independiente; Lanús; Newell's Old Boys; Racing; River Plate; Rosario Central; San Lorenzo; Vélez Sarsfield	Agropecuario Argentino; Almagro; Atlético de Rafaela; Atlético Tucumán; Belgrano; Colón; Defensa y Justicia; Godoy Cruz; Olimpo; Patronato; San Martín (SJ); Talleres (C); Temperley; Tigre; Unión; Villa Dálmine	Alvarado; Central Ballester; Central Córdoba (R); Central Córdoba (SdE); Central Norte; Cipolletti; Deportivo Maipú; Deportivo Rincón; Douglas Haig; General Lamadrid; Independiente (Ch)^{[1]}; Juventud Antoniana; Racing (C); Sarmiento (R); Sportivo Belgrano; Victoriano Arenas	Aldosivi (Pot 4); Brown (Pot 4); Defensores de Belgrano (Pot 5); Defensores Unidos (Pot 5); Deportivo Morón (Pot 5); Estudiantes (BA) (Pot 5); Gimnasia y Esgrima (J) (Pot 4); Guillermo Brown (Pot 4); Juventud Unida (G) (Pot 4); Luján (Pot 5); Midland (Pot 5); Mitre (SdE) (Pot 4); Platense (Pot 5); San Martín (T) (Pot 5); Tristán Suárez (Pot 4); UAI Urquiza (Pot 4)

^{1} The identity of the team Federal B 4 was not known at the time of the draw.

=== Bracket ===
==== Upper bracket ====
Round of 64
Estudiantes (LP)	4
Central Córdoba (R)	0
Agropecuario Argentino	0
Luján	1
San Lorenzo	1
Racing (C)	0
Colón (p)	1 (4)
Deportivo Morón	1 (3)
Argentinos Juniors	2
Independiente (Ch)	1
Defensa y Justicia	1
Mitre (SdE)	0
Chacarita Juniors	0
Deportivo Maipú	3
Temperley	1
Estudiantes (BA)	0
Newell's Old Boys	2
Deportivo Rincón	0
Godoy Cruz	1 (2)
Defensores Unidos (p)	1 (4)
Huracán	1
Victoriano Arenas	0
Atlético Tucumán	1
Tristán Suárez	0
Rosario Central	6
Juventud Antoniana	0
Talleres (C)	2
Midland	1
Arsenal	0 (2)
Cipolletti (p)	0 (3)
Almagro	1
Gimnasia y Esgrima (J)	0

Round of 32
Estudiantes (LP) (p)	0 (4)
Luján	0 (1)
San Lorenzo (p)	2 (3)
Colón	2 (1)
Argentinos Juniors (p)	0 (4)
Defensa y Justicia	0 (3)
Deportivo Maipú	0
Temperley	4
Newell's Old Boys	3
Defensores Unidos	0
Huracán	0
Atlético Tucumán	2
Rosario Central (p)	0 (5)
Talleres (C)	0 (3)
Cipolletti	0
Almagro	2

Round of 16
Estudiantes (LP)	1
San Lorenzo	3
Argentinos Juniors	0
Temperley	2
Newell's Old Boys (p)	0 (5)
Atlético Tucumán	0 (3)
Rosario Central (p)	1 (5)
Almagro	1 (4)

Quarterfinals
San Lorenzo	1 (1)
Temperley (p)	1 (4)
Newell's Old Boys	1
Rosario Central	2

Semifinals
Temperley	1 (2)
Rosario Central (p)	1 (4)

==== Lower bracket ====
Round of 64
River Plate	7
Central Norte	0
Villa Dálmine (p)	0 (4)
UAI Urquiza	0 (3)
Banfield	1 (2)
General Lamadrid (p)	1 (3)
Belgrano	0
Platense	1
Racing	0
Sarmiento (R)	1
Unión	2
Juventud Unida (G)	0
Lanús (p)	1 (4)
Douglas Haig	1 (2)
Atlético de Rafaela	4
Defensores de Belgrano	1
Vélez Sarsfield	1 (3)
Central Córdoba (SdE) (p)	1 (4)
Tigre	1
Guillermo Brown	0
Independiente	8
Central Ballester	0
San Martín (SJ)	0 (4)
Brown (p)	0 (5)
Boca Juniors	6
Alvarado	0
Patronato	1
San Martín (T)	2
Gimnasia y Esgrima (LP)	1
Sportivo Belgrano	0
Olimpo (p)	1 (4)
Aldosivi	1 (3)

Round of 32
River Plate	3
Villa Dálmine	1
General Lamadrid	0
Platense	1
Sarmiento (R)	2
Unión	1
Lanús	1
Atlético de Rafaela	2
Central Córdoba (SdE)	2
Tigre	0
Independiente	1 (3)
Brown (p)	1 (4)
Boca Juniors	2
San Martín (T)	0
Gimnasia y Esgrima (LP)	1
Olimpo	0

Round of 16
River Plate	2
Platense	0
Sarmiento (R)	2
Atlético de Rafaela	0
Central Córdoba (SdE)	1
Brown	0
Boca Juniors	0
Gimnasia y Esgrima (LP)	1

Quarterfinals
River Plate	3
Sarmiento (R)	1
Central Córdoba (SdE)	1 (3)
Gimnasia y Esgrima (LP) (p)	1 (4)

Semifinals
River Plate	2 (4)
Gimnasia y Esgrima (LP) (p)	2 (5)

=== Round of 64 ===
The Round of 64 had 12 qualified teams from the Regional Round (8 teams from Torneo Federal A and 4 teams from Torneo Federal B), 12 qualified teams from the Metropolitan Zone (5 teams from Primera B Metropolitana; 4 teams from Primera C and 3 teams from Primera D), 12 teams from Primera B Nacional and 28 teams from Primera División. The round was played between 9 May and 2 August, in a single knock-out match format. The 32 winning teams advanced to the Round of 32.

July 24, 2018	Estudiantes (LP)	4–0	Central Córdoba (R)	Sarandí, Pcia. de Buenos Aires
21:10	Schunke 14'; Zuqui 53'; Rodríguez 63'; Pavone 87'	Report		Stadium: Julio Humberto Grondona; Referee: Gerardo Méndez Cedro

July 16, 2018	Agropecuario Argentino	0–1	Luján	Junín, Pcia. de Buenos Aires
16:00		Report	Sánchez 58'	Stadium: Eva Perón; Referee: Fabricio Llobet

July 16, 2018	San Lorenzo	1–0	Racing (C)	Sarandí, Pcia. de Buenos Aires
21:20	Díaz 62'	Report		Stadium: Julio Humberto Grondona; Referee: Fernando Echenique

July 21, 2018	Colón	1–1 (4–3 p)	Deportivo Morón	Rosario, Pcia. de Santa Fe
20:10	Correa 39'	Report	R. Martínez 53'	Stadium: Marcelo Bielsa; Referee: Maximiliano Ramírez
	Penalties
	Ruiz (penalty scored); Correa (penalty scored); Bernardi (penalty missed); González (penalty scored); Ortiz (penalty scored)		(penalty scored) Akerman; (penalty scored) R. Martínez; (penalty scored) Ramírez; (penalty missed) Celaya; (penalty missed) González

May 9, 2018	Argentinos Juniors	2–1	Independiente (Ch)	Junín, Pcia. de Buenos Aires
15:40	Batallini 22'; A. Mac Allister 90+3'	Report	Pacheco 56'	Stadium: Eva Perón; Referee: Yael Falcón Pérez

May 18, 2018	Defensa y Justicia	1–0	Mitre (SdE)	Sarandí, Pcia. de Buenos Aires
16:00	Almeida 63'	Report		Stadium: Julio Humberto Grondona; Referee: Nicolás Lamolina

May 15, 2018	Chacarita Juniors	0–3	Deportivo Maipú	Cutral Có, Pcia. de Neuquén
18:00		Report	S. González 16'; Persia 36'; García 54'	Stadium: Coloso del Ruca Quimey; Referee: Héctor Paletta

July 27, 2018	Temperley	1–0	Estudiantes (BA)	Sarandí, Pcia. de Buenos Aires
17:10	Mancinelli 1'	Report		Stadium: Julio Humberto Grondona; Referee: Pablo Díaz

May 18, 2018	Newell's Old Boys	2–0	Deportivo Rincón	Santa Fe, Pcia. de Santa Fe
21:10	Torres 30'; A. Rodríguez 45'	Report		Stadium: 15 de Abril; Referee: Lucas Comesaña

July 23, 2018	Godoy Cruz	1–1 (2–4 p)	Defensores Unidos	Córdoba, Pcia. de Córdoba
21:10	Ramis 57'	Report	Cáceres 30'	Stadium: Presidente Perón; Referee: Pablo Díaz
	Penalties
	García (penalty scored); Angileri (penalty missed); Viera (penalty scored); Ávalos (penalty missed)		(penalty scored) Velázquez; (penalty missed) Escobar; (penalty scored) Kruchowski; (penalty scored) Echagüe; (penalty scored) Contreras

July 26, 2018	Huracán	1–0	Victoriano Arenas	Turdera, Pcia. de Buenos Aires
15:30	Chávez 17' (pen.)	Report		Stadium: Alfredo Beranger; Referee: Julio Barraza

July 22, 2018	Atlético Tucumán	1–0	Tristán Suárez	Sarandí, Pcia. de Buenos Aires
15:00	Díaz 79'	Report		Stadium: Julio Humberto Grondona; Referee: Facundo Tello

August 2, 2018	Rosario Central	6–0	Juventud Antoniana	Santa Fe, Pcia. de Santa Fe
21:10	Ruben 14' (pen.); Zampedri 40'; Herrera 69', 86'; Bettini 73'; Camacho 80'	Report		Stadium: 15 de Abril; Referee: Andrés Merlos

July 31, 2018	Talleres (C)	2–1	Midland	Santa Fe, Pcia. de Santa Fe
21:10	Godoy 16', 47'	Report	Komar 39' (o.g.)	Stadium: Brigadier General Estanislao López; Referee: Héctor Paletta

May 26, 2018	Arsenal	0–0 (2–3 p)	Cipolletti	Cutral Có, Pcia. de Neuquén
13:30		Report		Stadium: Coloso del Ruca Quimey; Referee: Luis Álvarez
	Penalties
	Drocco (penalty missed); Curado (penalty scored); García (penalty scored); Ferreyra (penalty missed); Milo (penalty missed)		(penalty missed) Valente; (penalty scored) Sosa; (penalty scored) J. Morales; (penalty scored) E. Romero

July 29, 2018	Almagro	1–0	Gimnasia y Esgrima (J)	Turdera, Pcia. de Buenos Aires
18:00	Acosta 73'	Report		Stadium: Alfredo Beranger; Referee: Leandro Rey Hilfer

July 22, 2018	River Plate	7–0	Central Norte	Santa Fe, Pcia. de Santa Fe
18:00	Scocco 4', 22'; Pratto 15'; Martínez Quarta 31'; Palacios 45', 48'; Borré 64'	Report		Stadium: Brigadier General Estanislao López; Referee: Hernán Mastrángelo

July 17, 2018	Villa Dálmine	0–0 (4–3 p)	UAI Urquiza	Villa Maipú, Pcia. de Buenos Aires
21:10		Report		Stadium: Chacarita Juniors; Referee: Sebastián Ranciglio
	Penalties
	Jourdan (penalty missed); Martinich (penalty missed); González (penalty scored); Molina (penalty scored); Ballini (penalty scored); Dobboletta (penalty scored)		(penalty scored) Baglivo; (penalty scored) Treppo; (penalty scored) Chao; (penalty missed) Barrionuevo; (penalty missed) Pietrobono; (penalty missed) Cozzoni

July 18, 2018	Banfield	1–1 (2–3 p)	General Lamadrid	Sarandí, Pcia. de Buenos Aires
22:00	López 5'	Report	Rodríguez 21' (o.g.)	Stadium: Julio Humberto Grondona; Referee: Ariel Suárez
	Penalties
	Rodríguez (penalty missed); López (penalty scored); Payero (penalty missed); Bertolo (penalty scored); Civelli (penalty missed)		(penalty scored) Sarandeses; (penalty missed) Serrano; (penalty scored) Ruefli; (penalty missed) Vera; (penalty scored) Acosta

May 20, 2018	Belgrano	0–1	Platense	Banfield, Pcia. de Buenos Aires
19:10		Report	Bocchino 34'	Stadium: Florencio Sola; Referee: Pedro Argañaraz

May 17, 2018	Racing	0–1	Sarmiento (R)	Banfield, Pcia. de Buenos Aires
21:10		Report	Orzán 70'	Stadium: Florencio Sola; Referee: Ariel Penel

May 17, 2018	Unión	2–0	Juventud Unida (G)	Paraná, Pcia. de Entre Ríos
17:10	R. Gómez 17' (pen.); Soldano 64'	Report		Stadium: Presbítero Bartolomé Grella; Referee: Nazareno Arasa

July 30, 2018	Lanús	1–1 (4–2 p)	Douglas Haig	Florencio Varela, Pcia. de Buenos Aires
21:10	Martínez 12'	Report	Duma 79'	Stadium: Norberto "Tito" Tomaghello; Referee: Pablo Echavarría
	Penalties
	Vides (penalty scored); Lódico (penalty missed); Acosta (penalty scored); Di Plácido (penalty scored); Pereyra Díaz (penalty scored)		(penalty missed) Belfiore; (penalty scored) Arismendi; (penalty scored) Montero; (penalty missed) Duma

July 24, 2018	Atlético de Rafaela	4–1	Defensores de Belgrano	Junín, Pcia. de Buenos Aires
17:10	Copetti 10'; Quiroga 13'; Masuero 48'; Martino 81'	Report	Martínez Montagnoli 42'	Stadium: Eva Perón; Referee: Jorge Broggi

July 17, 2018	Vélez Sarsfield	1–1 (3–4 p)	Central Córdoba (SdE)	Turdera, Pcia. de Buenos Aires
16:00	Vargas 78'	Report	Pérez 15'	Stadium: Alfredo Beranger; Referee: Pablo Dóvalo
	Penalties
	Díaz (penalty scored); Robertone (penalty missed); Bouzat (penalty scored); Vargas (penalty scored); Bazán (penalty missed)		(penalty scored) Jara; (penalty scored) Barrionuevo; (penalty scored) Melivilo; (penalty scored) Vera Oviedo

July 20, 2018	Tigre	1–0	Guillermo Brown	Morón, Pcia. de Buenos Aires
14:30	Morales 26'	Report		Stadium: Nuevo Francisco Urbano; Referee: Diego Abal

July 20, 2018	Independiente	8–0	Central Ballester	Formosa, Pcia. de Formosa
21:10	Benítez 7', 52', 63'; Gaibor 13'; S. Romero 16', 71'; Meza 46' (pen.); Benavídez 88'	Report		Stadium: Antonio Romero; Referee: Pablo Echavarría

July 21, 2018	San Martín (SJ)	0–0 (4–5 p)	Brown	Morón, Pcia. de Buenos Aires
15:00		Report		Stadium: Nuevo Francisco Urbano; Referee: Pedro Argañaraz
	Penalties
	Castillejos (penalty scored); Mosca (penalty scored); Ardente (penalty scored); Grahl (penalty scored); Magnín (penalty missed); Bravo (penalty missed)		(penalty scored) Olivares; (penalty scored) Stegman; (penalty scored) Garate; (penalty missed) Ruiz Sosa; (penalty scored) Ortiz; (penalty scored) Lamas

August 1, 2018	Boca Juniors	6–0	Alvarado	Lanús, Pcia. de Buenos Aires
19:10	Magallán 4'; Ábila 24'; Pérez 28', 34'; Goltz 55'; Tévez 86' (pen.)	Report		Stadium: Ciudad de Lanús; Referee: Darío Herrera

July 26, 2018	Patronato	1–2	San Martín (T)	Morón, Pcia. de Buenos Aires
21:10	Sperduti 57' (pen.)	Report	Bieler 5', 77'	Stadium: Nuevo Francisco Urbano; Referee: Diego Ceballos

July 21, 2018	Gimnasia y Esgrima (LP)	1–0	Sportivo Belgrano	Turdera, Pcia. de Buenos Aires
17:30	Licht 80'	Report		Stadium: Alfredo Beranger; Referee: Jorge Baliño

July 20, 2018	Olimpo	1–1 (4–3 p)	Aldosivi	Sarandí, Pcia. de Buenos Aires
17:10	Ferreyra 14'	Report	L. Galeano 6'	Stadium: Julio Humberto Grondona; Referee: Nazareno Arasa
	Penalties
	Belleggia (penalty missed); Fornari (penalty scored); Ibáñez (penalty missed); Vidal (penalty scored); Rodríguez (penalty scored); Lacunza (penalty scored)		(penalty missed) Telechea; (penalty scored) J. Galeano; (penalty scored) Chávez; (penalty scored) Villalba; (penalty missed) Yeri; (penalty missed) Quílez

=== Round of 32 ===
This round had 32 qualified teams from the Round of 64. The round was played between 28 July and 10 September, in a single knock-out match format. The 16 winning teams advanced to the Round of 16.

September 6, 2018	Estudiantes (LP)	0–0 (4–1 p)	Luján	Sarandí, Pcia. de Buenos Aires
15:40		Report		Stadium: Julio Humberto Grondona; Referee: Nazareno Arasa
	Penalties
	Fernández (penalty scored); Pavone (penalty scored); Rodríguez (penalty scored); Schunke (penalty scored)		(penalty missed) Chambi; (penalty missed) Seguel; (penalty scored) De Tomasso

September 7, 2018	San Lorenzo	2–2 (3–1 p)	Colón	Rosario, Pcia. de Santa Fe
21:10	Reniero 68', 75'	Report	Leguizamón 17'; Fritzler 64'	Stadium: Marcelo Bielsa; Referee: Andrés Merlos
	Penalties
	Blandi (penalty scored); Senesi (penalty missed); Mouche (penalty scored); Castro (penalty scored)		(penalty scored) Ruiz; (penalty missed) Estigarribia; (penalty missed) Fritzler; (penalty missed) Leguizamón

August 5, 2018	Argentinos Juniors	0–0 (4–3 p)	Defensa y Justicia	Sarandí, Pcia. de Buenos Aires
19:10		Report		Stadium: Julio Humberto Grondona; Referee: Silvio Trucco
	Penalties
	A. Mac Allister (penalty scored); Torrén (penalty scored); Batallini (penalty scored); Machín (penalty missed); Sandoval (penalty scored)		(penalty missed) Barboza; (penalty scored) Togni; (penalty missed) Molina; (penalty scored) Bordagaray; (penalty scored) Larrondo

August 17, 2018	Deportivo Maipú	0–4	Temperley	Sarandí, Pcia. de Buenos Aires
17:00		Report	González 4', 24'; Giordana 13' (pen.); Mazur 74'	Stadium: Julio Humberto Grondona; Referee: Nazareno Arasa

August 5, 2018	Newell's Old Boys	3–0	Defensores Unidos	Junín, Pcia. de Buenos Aires
17:05	Luís Leal 57'; Bíttolo 76'; Fértoli 89'	Report		Stadium: Eva Perón; Referee: Jorge Baliño

August 3, 2018	Huracán	0–2	Atlético Tucumán	Salta, Pcia. de Salta
21:00		Report	Bianchi 75'; Díaz 90+2'	Stadium: Padre Ernesto Martearena; Referee: Diego Abal

September 6, 2018	Rosario Central	0–0 (5–3 p)	Talleres (C)	Lanús, Pcia. de Buenos Aires
21:10		Report		Stadium: Ciudad de Lanús; Referee: Fernando Rapallini
	Penalties
	Ortigoza (penalty scored); Parot (penalty scored); Gil (penalty scored); Camacho (penalty scored); Zampedri (penalty scored)		(penalty scored) Soñora; (penalty missed) Ortiz; (penalty scored) Cubas; (penalty scored) Arias

August 19, 2018	Cipolletti	0–2	Almagro	Cutral Có, Pcia. de Neuquén
15:10		Report	Susvielles 36'; García 50'	Stadium: Coloso del Ruca Quimey; Referee: Julio Barraza

July 28, 2018	River Plate	3–1	Villa Dálmine	Formosa, Pcia. de Formosa
19:10	Martínez 14' (pen.); Fernández 50'; Pratto 59'	Report	Martinich 87'	Stadium: Antonio Romero; Referee: Facundo Tello

August 8, 2018	General Lamadrid	0–1	Platense	Sarandí, Pcia. de Buenos Aires
21:15		Report	Iribarren 3'	Stadium: Julio Humberto Grondona; Referee: Yael Falcón Pérez

September 9, 2018	Sarmiento (R)	2–1	Unión	Banfield, Pcia. de Buenos Aires
20:10	Huth 82'; Silba 83'	Report	Fragapane 3'	Stadium: Florencio Sola; Referee: Facundo Tello

August 22, 2018	Lanús	1–2	Atlético de Rafaela	Junín, Pcia. de Buenos Aires
20:00	Coniglio 47'	Report	Albertengo 29', 37'	Stadium: Eva Perón; Referee: Andrés Merlos

August 4, 2018	Central Córdoba (SdE)	2–0	Tigre	Santa Fe, Pcia. de Santa Fe
21:15	Ortega 74'; Ramírez 86'	Report		Stadium: 15 de Abril; Referee: Héctor Paletta

September 10, 2018	Independiente	1–1 (3–4 p)	Brown	Lanús, Pcia. de Buenos Aires
21:10	S. Romero 23' (pen.)	Report	Olivares 63'	Stadium: Ciudad de Lanús; Referee: Nicolás Lamolina
	Penalties
	S. Romero (penalty scored); G. Silva (penalty scored); Brítez (penalty missed); Domingo (penalty scored); Figal (penalty missed)		(penalty scored) Olivares; (penalty scored) Stegman; (penalty scored) Benegas; (penalty scored) Guille

September 7, 2018	Boca Juniors	2–0	San Martín (T)	Formosa, Pcia. de Formosa
18:00	Cardona 75'; Ábila 90' (pen.)	Report		Stadium: Antonio Romero; Referee: Silvio Trucco

July 29, 2018	Gimnasia y Esgrima (LP)	1–0	Olimpo	Cutral Có, Pcia. de Neuquén
15:10	Gómez 40'	Report		Stadium: Coloso del Ruca Quimey; Referee: Silvio Trucco

=== Round of 16 ===
This round had the 16 qualified teams from the Round of 32. The round was played between 8 September and 3 October, in a single knock-out match format. The 8 winning teams advanced to the Quarterfinals.

October 3, 2018	Estudiantes (LP)	1–3	San Lorenzo	Mendoza, Pcia. de Mendoza
18:30	Sánchez 55'	Report	Mouche 43' (pen.); Reniero 79'; Gaich 82'	Stadium: Malvinas Argentinas; Referee: Fernando Espinoza

September 9, 2018	Argentinos Juniors	0–2	Temperley	Cutral Có, Pcia. de Neuquén
15:10		Report	González 17'; Delgado 70'	Stadium: Coloso del Ruca Quimey; Referee: Diego Abal

September 8, 2018	Newell's Old Boys	0–0 (5–3 p)	Atlético Tucumán	Turdera, Pcia. de Buenos Aires
13:15		Report		Stadium: Alfredo Beranger; Referee: Germán Delfino
	Penalties
	Figueroa (penalty scored); Bernardello (penalty scored); Luís Leal (penalty scored); Fértoli (penalty scored); Callegari (penalty scored)		(penalty scored) Díaz; (penalty scored) Acosta; (penalty scored) Lucchetti; (penalty missed) Noir

October 3, 2018	Rosario Central	1–1 (5–4 p)	Almagro	Santa Fe, Pcia. de Santa Fe
21:30	Herrera 31'	Report	Acosta 36' (pen.)	Stadium: 15 de Abril; Referee: Jorge Baliño
	Penalties
	Ortigoza (penalty scored); Ruben (penalty scored); Parot (penalty scored); Camacho (penalty scored); Zampedri (penalty missed); Caruzzo (penalty scored)		(penalty scored) J. Torres; (penalty scored) Arce; (penalty scored) Susvielles; (penalty missed) González; (penalty scored) Piovi; (penalty missed) Basualdo

September 12, 2018	River Plate	2–0	Platense	Lanús, Pcia. de Buenos Aires
20:10	Pratto 64' (pen.); Scocco 81' (pen.)	Report		Stadium: Ciudad de Lanús; Referee: Ariel Penel

October 2, 2018	Sarmiento (R)	2–0	Atlético de Rafaela	Paraná, Pcia. de Entre Ríos
19:30	Silba 42' (pen.); Gauto González 90'	Report		Stadium: Presbítero Bartolomé Grella; Referee: Diego Ceballos

September 26, 2018	Central Córdoba (SdE)	1–0	Brown	Santa Fe, Pcia. de Santa Fe
21:10	Rossi 62'	Report		Stadium: Brigadier General Estanislao López; Referee: Ariel Penel

September 27, 2018	Boca Juniors	0–1	Gimnasia y Esgrima (LP)	Córdoba, Pcia. de Córdoba
21:10		Report	Hurtado 89'	Stadium: Mario Alberto Kempes; Referee: Pablo Echavarría

=== Quarterfinals ===
This round had the 8 qualified teams from the Round of 16. The round was played between 7 October and 1 November, in a single knock-out match format. The 4 winning teams advanced to the Semifinals.

The Rosario derby (Newell's Old Boys vs. Rosario Central) was played behind closed doors preventing potentially dangerous clashes between rival supporters.

October 31, 2018	San Lorenzo	1–1 (1–4 p)	Temperley	Lanús, Pcia. de Buenos Aires
19:00	Blandi 90+1'	Report	Costa 15'	Stadium: Ciudad de Lanús; Referee: Pablo Echavarría
	Penalties
	Mouche (penalty missed); A. Rojas (penalty missed); Hernández (penalty scored)		(penalty scored) Castro; (penalty scored) Prieto; (penalty scored) Di Lorenzo; (penalty scored) Brum

November 1, 2018	Newell's Old Boys	1–2	Rosario Central	Sarandí, Pcia. de Buenos Aires
15:30	Torres 90+3'	Report	Herrera 62'; Zampedri 68'	Stadium: Julio Humberto Grondona; Referee: Patricio Loustau

October 7, 2018	River Plate	3–1	Sarmiento (R)	Mendoza, Pcia. de Mendoza
15:30	Quintero 26', 76'; Borré 33'	Report	Silba 43' (pen.)	Stadium: Malvinas Argentinas; Referee: Fernando Espinoza

October 13, 2018	Central Córdoba (SdE)	1–1 (3–4 p)	Gimnasia y Esgrima (LP)	Rafaela, Pcia. de Santa Fe
15:00	Ramírez 47'	Report	Hurtado 83'	Stadium: Nuevo Monumental; Referee: Andrés Merlos
	Penalties
	Barrionuevo (penalty scored); Vera Oviedo (penalty scored); Rossi (penalty missed); Romero (penalty scored); Pérez (penalty missed)		(penalty scored) Silva; (penalty scored) Licht; (penalty scored) Hurtado; (penalty scored) Bonifacio

=== Semifinals ===
This round had the 4 qualified teams from the Quarterfinals. The round was played on 18 and 28 November, in a single knock-out match format. The 2 winning teams advanced to the Final.

November 18, 2018	Temperley	1–1 (2–4 p)	Rosario Central	Córdoba, Pcia. de Córdoba
17:10	Mazur 90+1'	Report	Zampedri 52'	Stadium: Mario Alberto Kempes; Referee: Andrés Merlos
	Penalties
	Castro (penalty missed); Prieto (penalty scored); Costa (penalty missed); Mancinelli (penalty scored)		(penalty scored) Ortigoza; (penalty scored) Ruben; (penalty missed) Caruzzo; (penalty scored) Camacho; (penalty scored) Gil

November 28, 2018	River Plate	2–2 (4–5 p)	Gimnasia y Esgrima (LP)	Mar del Plata, Pcia. de Buenos Aires
21:10	Martínez 29'; Pratto 46'	Report	Faravelli 33'; Silva 59'	Stadium: José María Minella; Referee: Facundo Tello
	Penalties
	Pratto (penalty missed); Ponzio (penalty scored); Martínez (penalty scored); Borré (penalty scored); Álvarez (penalty scored); Maidana (penalty missed)		(penalty scored) Silva; (penalty scored) Licht; (penalty scored) Hurtado; (penalty missed) Ayala; (penalty scored) Guanini; (penalty scored) Guiffrey

=== Final ===
December 6, 2018
21:10

Rosario Central	1–1	Gimnasia y Esgrima (LP)
Zampedri 19'	Report	Faravelli 52'
Penalties
Ortigoza (penalty scored); Ruben (penalty scored); Parot (penalty scored); Caruzzo (penalty scored)	4–1	(penalty missed) Silva; (penalty missed) Guanini; (penalty scored) Hurtado

Malvinas Argentinas, Mendoza
Referee: Patricio Loustau

== Top goalscorers ==
Rank	Player	Club	Goals
1	(Argentina) Héctor Rueda	Deportivo Rincón	5
1	(Argentina) Luis Silba	Sarmiento (R)	5
3	(Argentina) Germán Herrera	Rosario Central	4
3	(Paraguay) Pablo Palacios Alvarenga	Gimnasia y Esgrima (M)	4
3	(Argentina) Lucas Pratto	River Plate	4
3	(Argentina) Fernando Zampedri	Rosario Central	4
7	(Argentina) Fausto Apaza	Central Norte	3
7	(Argentina) Martín Benítez	Independiente	3
7	(Argentina) Facundo Cabral	Unión (S)	3
7	(Argentina) Sergio Chitero	Defensores (P)	3
7	(Argentina) Walter García	Deportivo Maipú	3
7	(Argentina) Leandro González	Temperley	3
7	(Argentina) Santiago González	Deportivo Maipú	3
7	(Argentina) Oscar Alberto Muñoz	Deportivo Rincón	3
7	(Argentina) Jorge Piñero da Silva	Cipolletti	3
7	(Argentina) Nicolás Reniero	San Lorenzo	3
7	(Argentina) Silvio Romero	Independiente	3
7	(Argentina) Ignacio Scocco	River Plate	3
7	(Argentina) Leandro Vella	Central Córdoba (SdE)	3

== Team of the tournament ==
Team
Goalkeeper	Defenders	Midfielders	Forwards
Jeremías Ledesma (Rosario Central)	Federico Mazur (Temperley); Matías Caruzzo (Rosario Central); Walter García (Deportivo Maipú)	Lorenzo Faravelli (Gimnasia y Esgrima (LP)); Alfredo Ramírez (Central Córdoba (SdE)); Fabián Rinaudo (Gimnasia y Esgrima (LP)); Héctor Rueda (Deportivo Rincón)	Fernando Zampedri (Rosario Central); Lucas Pratto (River Plate); Luis Silba (Sarmiento (R))
Substitutes
Matías Castro (Temperley)		Leonardo Gil (Rosario Central); Gonzalo Martínez (River Plate)	Nicolás Reniero (San Lorenzo); Leandro González (Temperley); Germán Herrera (Rosario Central); Jan Carlos Hurtado (Gimnasia y Esgrima (LP))
Coach
Edgardo Bauza (Rosario Central)

== See also ==
- 2017–18 Argentine Primera División
