= Puelles =

Puelles is a Spanish surname. Notable people with the surname include:

- Antonio Millán-Puelles (1921–2005), Spanish philosopher
- Claudio Puelles (born 1996), Peruvian professional mixed martial artist
- Francisco "Chapu" Puelles (born 1984), Chilean actor, circus worker, and television personality
- José Manuel Puelles de los Santos (1894–1936), Spanish physician
- José Felipe Puelles (born 1960), Mexican politician
- Luis Puelles (1877–?), Spanish footballer
- Vicente Muñoz Puelles (born 1948), Spanish author and translator

== See also ==
- Mas-Saintes-Puelles, commune in the Aude department in southern France
