= Ernesto Gómez =

Ernesto Gómez may refer to:

- Ernesto Gómez Cruz (born 1933), Mexican actor
- Ernesto Javier Gómez Barrales (born 1978), Mexican politician
- Ernesto Gómez (footballer, born 1982), Spanish footballer
- Ernesto Gómez (footballer, born 1985), Spanish footballer
- Ernesto Gómez (footballer, born 1994), Spanish footballer

See also:

- Ricardo Ernesto Gómez (born 1981), Argentine footballer
