= Abregú =

Abregú is a surname. Notable people with the surname include:

- César Abregú (born 1994), Argentinian footballer
- Gustavo Abregú (born 1997), Argentinian footballer
- Luis Abregú (born 1982), Argentinian boxer
