= 2016 Torneo Federal A =

III Torneo Federal A
- Season: 2016
- Champions: San Martín (T) (1st divisional title)
- Promoted: San Martín (T)
- Relegated: Güemes; Tiro Federal (BB)
- Matches played: 240
- Goals scored: 608 (2.53 per match)
- Top goalscorer: Matías Zbrun (13 goals)
- Biggest home win: Defensores de Belgrano (VR) 4-0 General Belgrano (February 22); Juventud Antoniana 4-0 Gimnasia y Tiro (March 13); Deportivo Madryn 4-0 Deportivo Roca (April 3); Concepcion FC 4-0 Güemes (May 2)
- Biggest away win: Sportivo Las Parejas 0-5 Unión (S) (March 27)
- Highest scoring: Alvarado 3-6 Libertad (S) (May 29)
- All statistics correct as of June 26, 2016.

The 2016 Argentine Torneo Federal A was the 3rd season of the third tier of the Argentine football league system. The tournament is reserved for teams indirectly affiliated to the Asociación del Fútbol Argentino (AFA), while teams affiliated to AFA have to play the Primera B Metropolitana, which is the other third tier competition. The champion was promoted to Primera B Nacional. 35 teams are competing in the league, 30 returning from the 2015 season, 4 teams that were relegated from Primera B Nacional, 3 teams promoted from Federal B. Also 2 teams resigned their participation in this season: 9 de Julio (M) and Unión (MdP) alleging economic difficulties. The regular season began on February 7 and ended on June 26.

== Format ==
=== First stage ===
The teams were divided into seven zones with five teams (a total of 35 teams) in each zone and it was played in a round-robin tournament whereby each team played each one of the other teams three times. The teams placed 1º and 2º and the two best 3º team from the seven zones qualified for the Second Stage.

=== Championship stages ===
The sixteen teams that qualified from the First Stage played against each other in a Double-elimination tournament from second to the fifth stage. The qualified teams were seeded in the final stages according to their results in the first stage, with the best eight seeded 1–8, and the worst eight teams seeded 9–16. The winning team was promoted to the Primera B Nacional.

=== Relegation Stage ===
After the first stage was played, a table was drawn with the thirty five (35) clubs and its overall standings with points obtained in the First Stage. The two last teams will be relegated to Torneo Federal B.

== Club information ==
Locations of the 2016 season teams.
Blue: Zone A; Yellow: Zone B;
Green: Zone C; Red: Zone D
Purple: Zone E; Orange: Zone F;
Brown: Zone G.

=== Zone A ===
Team	City	Stadium
Cipolletti	Cipolletti	La Visera de Cemento
Deportivo Madryn	Puerto Madryn	Coliseo del Golfo
Deportivo Roca	General Roca	Luis Maiolino
Independiente	Neuquén	José Rosas y Perito Moreno
Villa Mitre	Bahía Blanca	El Fortín

=== Zone B ===
Team	City	Stadium
Deportivo Maipú	Maipú	Higinio Sperdutti
Gimnasia y Esgrima	Mendoza	Víctor Antonio Legrotaglie
Gutiérrez	General Gutiérrez	General Gutiérrez
Sportivo Belgrano	San Francisco	Oscar Boero
Unión	Villa Krause	12 de Octubre

=== Zone C ===
Team	City	Stadium
Alvarado	Mar del Plata	(None) ^{1}
Defensores de Belgrano	Villa Ramallo	Salomón Boeseldín
Ferro Carril Oeste	General Pico	El Coloso del Barrio Talleres
General Belgrano	Santa Rosa	Nuevo Rancho Grande
Tiro Federal	Bahía Blanca	Onofre Pirrone

^{1} Play their home games at Estadio José María Minella.

=== Zone D ===
Team	City	Stadium
Altos Hornos Zapla	Palpalá	Emilio Fabrizzi
Gimnasia y Tiro	Salta	Gigante del Norte
Juventud Antoniana	Salta	Fray Honorato Pistoia
San Lorenzo	Catamarca	Bicentenario Ciudad de Catamarca
Unión Aconquija	Aconquija	Municipal de Aconquija

=== Zone E ===
Team	City	Stadium
Concepción	Concepción	Stewart Shipton
Güemes	Santiago del Estero	Arturo Miranda
Mitre	Santiago del Estero	Doctores José y Antonio Castiglione
San Jorge	San Miguel de Tucumán	Senador Luis Cruz
San Martín	San Miguel de Tucumán	La Ciudadela

=== Zone F ===
Team	City	Stadium
Chaco For Ever	Resistencia	Juan Alberto García
Guaraní Antonio Franco	Posadas	Clemente F. de Oliveira
Sarmiento	Resistencia	Centenario
Sol de América	Formosa	(None)^{1}
Sportivo Patria	Formosa	Antonio Romero

^{1} Play their home games at Estadio Antonio Romero.

=== Zone G ===
Team	City	Stadium
Defensores	Pronunciamiento	Delio Cardozo
Gimnasia y Esgrima	Concepción del Uruguay	Manuel y Ramón Núñez
Libertad	Sunchales	Hogar de Los Tigres
Sportivo Las Parejas	Las Parejas	Fortaleza del Lobo
Unión	Sunchales	La Fortaleza

== First stage ==
=== Zone A ===
Pos	Team	Pld	W	D	L	GF	GA	GD	Pts	Qualification
1	Deportivo Madryn	12	6	3	3	27	17	+10	21	Advance to Championship Stages
2	Independiente (N)	12	6	2	4	17	17	0	20	Advance to Championship Stages
3	Cipolletti	12	4	5	3	17	12	+5	17	
4	Villa Mitre	12	3	3	6	13	19	−6	12	
5	Deportivo Roca	12	3	3	6	11	20	−9	12	

Source: AFA
Rules for classification: 1) points; 2) goal difference; 3) goal scored; 4) away goals scored; 5) draw of lots.

==== Results ====
===== Matches 1–10 =====
Teams played each other twice, once at home, once away.

Home \ Away	CIP	DMA	DRO	INE	VMI
Cipolletti		1–1	1–1	3–0	1–0
Deportivo Madryn	2–1		4–0	3–1	3–1
Deportivo Roca	0–0	3–2		1–0	3–1
Independiente (N)	2–2	3–2	1–0		2–0
Villa Mitre	0–0	1–3	4–1	1–3	

Source: AFA
Legend: Blue = home team win; Yellow = draw; Red = away team win.

===== Matches 11–15 =====
Teams played every other team once (either at home or away).

Home \ Away	CIP	DMA	DRO	INE	VMI
Cipolletti			3–0	3–1	
Deportivo Madryn	3–1				1–1
Deportivo Roca		1–1		0–1	
Independiente (N)		3–2			0–0
Villa Mitre	2–1		2–1		

Source: AFA
Legend: Blue = home team win; Yellow = draw; Red = away team win.

=== Zone B ===
Pos	Team	Pld	W	D	L	GF	GA	GD	Pts	Qualification
1	Unión (VK)	12	5	6	1	11	8	+3	21	Advance to Championship Stages
2	Sportivo Belgrano	12	5	3	4	13	11	+2	18	Advance to Championship Stages
3	Gutiérrez SC	12	3	6	3	11	12	−1	15	
4	Gimnasia y Esgrima (M)	12	3	5	4	11	11	0	14	
5	Deportivo Maipú	12	1	6	5	11	15	−4	9	

Source: AFA
Rules for classification: 1) points; 2) goal difference; 3) goal scored; 4) away goals scored; 5) draw of lots.

==== Results ====
===== Matches 1–10 =====
Teams played each other twice, once at home, once away.

Home \ Away	DEM	GEM	GSC	SPB	UVK
Deportivo Maipú		2–2	1–1	0–2	0–1
Gimnasia y Esgrima (M)	1–1		2–1	3–0	1–1
Gutiérrez SC	1–0	1–0		1–0	0–0
Sportivo Belgrano	2–0	1–0	3–1		0–0
Unión (VK)	1–4	0–0	0–0	2–1	

Source: AFA
Legend: Blue = home team win; Yellow = draw; Red = away team win.

===== Matches 11–15 =====
Teams played every other team once (either at home or away).

Home \ Away	DEM	GEM	GSC	SPB	UVK
Deportivo Maipú		0–0	1–1		
Gimnasia y Esgrima (M)			2–1		0–2
Gutiérrez SC				1–1	2–2
Sportivo Belgrano	2–2	1–0			
Unión (VK)	1–0			1–0	

Source: AFA
Legend: Blue = home team win; Yellow = draw; Red = away team win.

=== Zone C ===
Pos	Team	Pld	W	D	L	GF	GA	GD	Pts	Qualification
1	Defensores de Belgrano (VR)	12	5	6	1	18	7	+11	21	Advance to Championship Stages
2	Alvarado	12	6	3	3	15	10	+5	21	Advance to Championship Stages
3	Ferro Carril Oeste (GP)	12	5	5	2	15	10	+5	20	
4	General Belgrano	12	4	2	6	13	20	−7	14	
5	Tiro Federal (BB)	12	1	2	9	8	22	−14	5	

Source: AFA
Rules for classification: 1) points; 2) goal difference; 3) goal scored; 4) away goals scored; 5) draw of lots.

==== Results ====
===== Matches 1–10 =====
Teams played each other twice, once at home, once away.

Home \ Away	ALV	DEF	FCO	GBE	TIF
Alvarado		0–2	1–2	2–0	2–1
Defensores de Belgrano (VR)	0–2		1–1	4–0	3–0
Ferro Carril Oeste (GP)	1–1	0–0		2–1	3–0
General Belgrano	2–1	1–1	2–0		1–0
Tiro Federal (BB)	0–0	1–1	0–2	3–4	

Source: AFA
Legend: Blue = home team win; Yellow = draw; Red = away team win.

===== Matches 11–15 =====
Teams played every other team once (either at home or away).

Home \ Away	ALV	DEF	FCO	GBE	TIF
Alvarado		0–0		2–0	
Defensores de Belgrano (VR)			0–0	2–1	
Ferro Carril Oeste (GP)	2–3				1–0
General Belgrano			1–1		0–2
Tiro Federal (BB)	0–1	1–4			

Source: AFA
Legend: Blue = home team win; Yellow = draw; Red = away team win.

=== Zone D ===
Pos	Team	Pld	W	D	L	GF	GA	GD	Pts	Qualification
1	Unión Aconquija	12	8	2	2	21	9	+12	26	Advance to Championship Stages
2	Juventud Antoniana	12	5	3	4	20	13	+7	18	Advance to Championship Stages
3	Gimnasia y Tiro	12	5	3	4	14	13	+1	18	
4	San Lorenzo (A)	12	3	3	6	13	21	−8	12	
5	Altos Hornos Zapla	12	3	1	8	12	24	−12	10	

Source: AFA
Rules for classification: 1) points; 2) goal difference; 3) goal scored; 4) away goals scored; 5) draw of lots.

==== Results ====
===== Matches 1–10 =====
Teams played each other twice, once at home, once away.

Home \ Away	AHZ	GYT	JUA	SLA	UAC
Altos Hornos Zapla		2–1	1–2	1–1	0–2
Gimnasia y Tiro	2–0		3–1	2–0	3–0
Juventud Antoniana	1–2	4–0		2–2	1–1
San Lorenzo (A)	1–2	2–0	1–0		1–3
Unión Aconquija	2–1	3–0	0–1	1–0	

Source: AFA
Legend: Blue = home team win; Yellow = draw; Red = away team win.

===== Matches 11–15 =====
Teams played every other team once (either at home or away).

Home \ Away	AHZ	GYT	JUA	SLA	UAC
Altos Hornos Zapla		1–3	0–4		
Gimnasia y Tiro			0–0	0–0	
Juventud Antoniana				4–1	0–2
San Lorenzo (A)	3–1				1–5
Unión Aconquija	2–1	0–0			

Source: AFA
Legend: Blue = home team win; Yellow = draw; Red = away team win.

=== Zone E ===
Pos	Team	Pld	W	D	L	GF	GA	GD	Pts	Qualification
1	San Martín (T)	12	6	4	2	14	9	+5	22	Advance to Championship Stages
2	Mitre (SdE)	12	6	2	4	14	10	+4	20	Advance to Championship Stages
3	Concepción FC	12	5	4	3	19	13	+6	19	
4	San Jorge (T)	12	3	4	5	12	14	−2	13	
5	Güemes	12	1	4	7	10	23	−13	7	

Source: AFA
Rules for classification: 1) points; 2) goal difference; 3) goal scored; 4) away goals scored; 5) draw of lots.

==== Results ====
===== Matches 1–10 =====
Teams played each other twice, once at home, once away.

Home \ Away	CFC	GÜE	MIT	SJT	SMT
Concepción FC		4–1	1–2	1–1	1–0
Güemes	1–2		0–2	0–2	1–1
Mitre (SdE)	1–1	1–1		2–0	0–1
San Jorge (T)	2–3	1–1	2–1		0–1
San Martín (T)	0–0	2–2	2–1	0–2	

Source: AFA
Legend: Blue = home team win; Yellow = draw; Red = away team win.

===== Matches 11–15 =====
Teams played every other team once (either at home or away).

Home \ Away	CFC	GÜE	MIT	SJT	SMT
Concepción FC		4–0	0–1		
Güemes				2–0	1–2
Mitre (SdE)		1–0		2–0	
San Jorge (T)	1–1				0–0
San Martín (T)	3–1		2–1		

Source: AFA
Legend: Blue = home team win; Yellow = draw; Red = away team win.

=== Zone F ===
Pos	Team	Pld	W	D	L	GF	GA	GD	Pts	Qualification
1	Sol de América (F)	12	7	2	3	17	11	+6	23	Advance to Championship Stages
2	Guaraní Antonio Franco	12	4	5	3	16	13	+3	17	Advance to Championship Stages
3	Chaco For Ever	12	4	3	5	13	15	−2	15	
4	Sportivo Patria	12	4	3	5	12	15	−3	15	
5	Sarmiento (R)	12	3	3	6	13	17	−4	12	

Source: AFA
Rules for classification: 1) points; 2) goal difference; 3) goal scored; 4) away goals scored; 5) draw of lots.

==== Results ====
===== Matches 1–10 =====
Teams played each other twice, once at home, once away.

Home \ Away	CFE	GAF	SAR	SOL	SPP
Chaco For Ever		1–0	1–1	2–3	2–0
Guaraní Antonio Franco	2–0		2–2	1–1	2–1
Sarmiento (R)	0–2	0–3		1–0	1–2
Sol de América (F)	0–0	1–0	1–2		1–0
Sportivo Patria	2–1	1–1	1–1	1–3	

Source: AFA
Legend: Blue = home team win; Yellow = draw; Red = away team win.

===== Matches 11–15 =====
Teams played every other team once (either at home or away).

Home \ Away	CFE	GAF	SAR	SOL	SPP
Chaco For Ever				2–1	0–1
Guaraní Antonio Franco	2–2		1–0		
Sarmiento (R)	3–0			1–2	
Sol de América (F)		3–1			1–0
Sportivo Patria		1–1	2–1		

Source: AFA
Legend: Blue = home team win; Yellow = draw; Red = away team win.

=== Zone G ===
Pos	Team	Pld	W	D	L	GF	GA	GD	Pts	Qualification
1	Libertad (S)	12	5	5	2	22	16	+6	20	Advance to Championship Stages
2	Sportivo Las Parejas	12	5	3	4	17	17	0	18	Advance to Championship Stages
3	Unión (S)	12	5	2	5	19	14	+5	17	
4	Defensores (P)	12	4	3	5	18	21	−3	15	
5	Gimnasia y Esgrima (CdU)	12	4	1	7	17	25	−8	13	

Source: AFA
Rules for classification: 1) points; 2) goal difference; 3) goal scored; 4) away goals scored; 5) draw of lots.

==== Results ====
===== Matches 1–10 =====
Teams played each other twice, once at home, once away.

Home \ Away	DPR	GYE	LIB	SLP	UNS
Defensores (P)		1–4	2–3	1–1	3–2
Gimnasia y Esgrima (CdU)	2–1		3–1	2–1	1–2
Libertad (S)	3–4	4–1		1–1	0–0
Sportivo Las Parejas	1–0	3–0	2–2		0–5
Unión (S)	0–1	1–0	2–2	1–2	

Source: AFA
Legend: Blue = home team win; Yellow = draw; Red = away team win.

===== Matches 11–15 =====
Teams played every other team once (either at home or away).

Home \ Away	DPR	GYE	LIB	SLP	UNS
Defensores (P)			1–1		2–0
Gimnasia y Esgrima (CdU)	2–2		0–2		
Libertad (S)				2–0	1–0
Sportivo Las Parejas	2–0	3–1			
Unión (S)		4–1		2–1	

Source: AFA
Legend: Blue = home team win; Yellow = draw; Red = away team win.

=== Ranking of third-placed teams ===
Pos	Grp	Team	Pld	W	D	L	GF	GA	GD	Pts	Qualification
1	C	Ferro Carril Oeste (GP)	12	5	5	2	15	10	+5	20	Advance to Championship Stages
2	E	Concepción FC	12	5	4	3	19	13	+6	19	Advance to Championship Stages
3	D	Gimnasia y Tiro	12	5	3	4	14	13	+1	18	
4	G	Unión (S)	12	5	2	5	19	14	+5	17	
5	A	Cipolletti	12	4	5	3	17	12	+5	17	
6	B	Gutiérrez SC	12	3	6	3	11	12	−1	15	
7	F	Sportivo Patria	12	4	3	5	12	15	−3	15	

Rules for classification: 1) points; 2) goal difference; 3) goal scored; 4) away goals scored; 5) draw of lots.

== Relegation ==
Pos	Team	Pld	W	D	L	GF	GA	GD	Pts	Relegation
1	Unión Aconquija	12	8	2	2	21	9	+12	26	
2	Sol de América (F)	12	7	2	3	17	11	+6	23	
3	San Martín (T)	12	6	4	2	14	9	+5	22	
4	Defensores de Belgrano (VR)	12	5	6	1	18	7	+11	21	
5	Deportivo Madryn	12	6	3	3	27	17	+10	21	
6	Alvarado	12	6	3	3	15	10	+5	21	
7	Unión (VK)	12	5	6	1	11	8	+3	21	
8	Libertad (S)	12	5	5	2	22	16	+6	20	
9	Ferro Carril Oeste (GP)	12	5	5	2	15	10	+5	20	
10	Mitre (SdE)	12	6	2	4	14	10	+4	20	
11	Independiente (N)	12	6	2	4	17	17	0	20	
12	Concepción FC	12	5	4	3	19	13	+6	19	
13	Juventud Antoniana	12	5	3	4	20	13	+7	18	
14	Sportivo Belgrano	12	5	3	4	13	11	+2	18	
15	Gimnasia y Tiro	12	5	3	4	14	13	+1	18	
16	Sportivo Las Parejas	12	5	3	4	17	17	0	18	
17	Unión (S)	12	5	2	5	19	14	+5	17	
18	Cipolletti	12	4	5	3	17	12	+5	17	
19	Guaraní Antonio Franco	12	4	5	3	16	13	+3	17	
20	Gutiérrez SC	12	3	6	3	11	12	−1	15	
21	Chaco For Ever	12	4	3	5	13	15	−2	15	
22	Defensores (P)	12	4	3	5	18	21	−3	15	
23	Sportivo Patria	12	4	3	5	12	15	−3	15	
24	Gimnasia y Esgrima (M)	12	3	5	4	11	11	0	14	
25	General Belgrano	12	4	2	6	13	20	−7	14	
26	San Jorge (T)	12	3	4	5	12	14	−2	13	
27	Gimnasia y Esgrima (CdU)	12	4	1	7	17	25	−8	13	
28	Sarmiento (R)	12	3	3	6	13	17	−4	12	
29	Villa Mitre	12	3	3	6	13	19	−6	12	
30	San Lorenzo (A)	12	3	3	6	13	21	−8	12	
31	Deportivo Roca	12	3	3	6	11	20	−9	12	
32	Altos Hornos Zapla	12	3	1	8	12	24	−12	10	
33	Deportivo Maipú	12	1	6	5	11	15	−4	9	
34	Güemes (R)	12	1	4	7	10	23	−13	7	Relegation to Torneo Federal B
35	Tiro Federal (BB) (R)	12	1	2	9	8	22	−14	5	Relegation to Torneo Federal B

Source: AFA
Rules for classification: 1) goal difference; 2) goals scored; 3) away goals scored; 4) draw of lots.
(R) Relegated

== Second to Fifth stage ==
Pos	Team	Pld	W	D	L	GF	GA	GD	Pts	Qualification
1	Unión Aconquija	12	8	2	2	21	9	+12	26	Qualified first from First Stage
2	Sol de América (F)	12	7	2	3	17	11	+6	23	Qualified first from First Stage
3	San Martín (T)	12	6	4	2	14	9	+5	22	Qualified first from First Stage
4	Defensores de Belgrano (VR)	12	5	6	1	18	7	+11	21	Qualified first from First Stage
5	Deportivo Madryn	12	6	3	3	27	17	+10	21	Qualified first from First Stage
6	Unión (VK)	12	5	6	1	11	8	+3	21	Qualified first from First Stage
7	Libertad (S)	12	5	5	2	22	16	+6	20	Qualified first from First Stage
8	Alvarado	12	6	3	3	15	10	+5	21	Qualified second from First Stage
9	Mitre (SdE)	12	6	2	4	14	10	+4	20	Qualified second from First Stage
10	Independiente (N)	12	6	2	4	17	17	0	20	Qualified second from First Stage
11	Juventud Antoniana	12	5	3	4	20	13	+7	18	Qualified second from First Stage
12	Sportivo Belgrano	12	5	3	4	13	11	+2	18	Qualified second from First Stage
13	Sportivo Las Parejas	12	5	3	4	17	17	0	18	Qualified second from First Stage
14	Guaraní Antonio Franco	12	4	5	3	16	13	+3	17	Qualified second from First Stage
15	Ferro Carril Oeste (GP)	12	5	5	2	15	10	+5	20	Qualified third from First Stage
16	Concepción FC	12	5	4	3	19	13	+6	19	Qualified third from First Stage

Source: AFA

=== Second stage ===
Team 1	Agg.	Team 2	1st leg	2nd leg
Unión Aconquija	4–1	Concepción FC	1–0	3–1
Sol de América (F)	2–4	Ferro Carril Oeste (GP)	1–3	1–1
San Martín (T)	3–3	Guaraní Antonio Franco	1–2	2–1
Defensores de Belgrano (VR)	5–2	Sportivo Las Parejas	2–2	3–0
Deportivo Madryn	1–3	Sportivo Belgrano	0–1	1–2
Unión (VK)	1–2	Juventud Antoniana	1–1	0–1
Libertad (S)	4–4	Independiente (N)	4–3	0–1
Alvarado	1–1	Mitre (SdE)	1–1	0–0

=== Third stage ===
Team 1	Agg.	Team 2	1st leg	2nd leg
Unión Aconquija	5–4	Ferro Carril Oeste (GP)	2–1	3–3
San Martín (T)	2–2	Sportivo Belgrano	1–0	1–2
Defensores de Belgrano (VR)	1–2	Juventud Antoniana	1–2	0–0
Libertad (S)	8–5	Alvarado	6–3	2–2

=== Fourth stage ===
Team 1	Agg.	Team 2	1st leg	2nd leg
Unión Aconquija	3–2	Juventud Antoniana	1–1	2–1
San Martín (T)	3–0	Libertad (S)	1–0	2–0

=== Fifth stage ===
Team 1	Agg.	Team 2	1st leg	2nd leg
Unión Aconquija	2–4	San Martín (T)	0–1	2–3

== Season statistics ==
=== Top scorers ===
Rank	Player	Club	Goals
1	(Argentina) Matías Zbrun	Libertad (S)	13
2	(Argentina) Gustavo Balvorín	Juventud Antoniana	12
3	(Argentina) Ramón Lentini	San Martín (T)	11
3	(Argentina) Diego Martínez	Unión Aconquija	11
4	(Argentina) Unión Aconquija	Juventud Antoniana	10
5	(Uruguay) Williams Peralta	Mitre (SdE)	9

== See also ==
- 2016 Primera B Nacional
- 2015–16 Copa Argentina
