= Jorge Piñero da Silva =

Argentine professional footballer

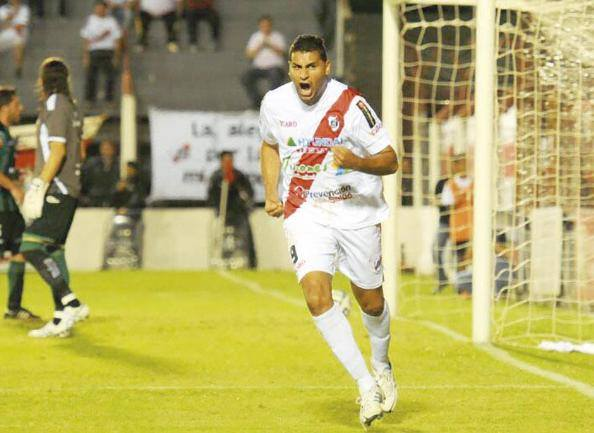

Personal information
- Full name: Jorge Armando Piñero da Silva
- Date of birth: 24 June 1987 (age 39)
- Place of birth: Candelaria, Argentina
- Height: 1.89 m (6 ft 2 in)
- Position: Forward

Team information
- Current team: Cipolletti

Senior career*
Years	Team	Apps	(Gls)
2005	CAI de Trelew		
2006	Deportivo MacAllister		
2006–2010	CAI	111	(26)
2010–2012	Godoy Cruz	4	(0)
2011–2012	→ Aldosivi (loan)	28	(7)
2012–2013	Patronato	11	(0)
2013–2014	CAI	28	(15)
2014–2015	Guaraní Antonio Franco	33	(5)
2016–2017	Deportivo Madryn	31	(17)
2017–2018	Cipolletti	23	(7)
2018	Nacional Potosí	0	(0)
2018–2019	Barracas Central	11	(0)
2019	Deportivo Madryn	7	(1)
2020–	Cipolletti	6	(1)
- * Club domestic league appearances and goals as of 11:59, 25 May 2020 (UTC)

Jorge Armando Piñero da Silva (born 24 June 1987) is an Argentine professional footballer who plays as a forward for Club Cipolletti.

== Career ==
Piñero da Silva spent the early years of his senior career in Torneo Argentino C with CAI de Trelew and Deportivo MacAllister. In 2006, Piñero da Silva joined Comodoro Rivadavia's CAI. He remained for four years in Primera B Nacional, scoring twenty-six goals in one hundred and eleven fixtures; notably netting twelve in 2009–10. 2010 saw Piñero da Silva sign for Primera División side Godoy Cruz. His debut came on 11 September versus Lanús, as he was subbed on in place of David Ramírez. Three further substitute appearances arrived for the club, prior to Piñero da Silva leaving on loan to Aldosivi for the 2011–12 season.

Having spent 2012–13 with Patronato, Piñero da Silva sealed a return to CAI; now of Torneo Argentino A. He scored seventeen goals in the subsequent campaign, which included a hat-trick over Alvarado in February 2014. Five months later, on 1 July 2014, Piñero da Silva completed a move to Guaraní Antonio Franco of Primera B Nacional. Thirty-three matches and five goals occurred as they suffered relegation. In 2016, Deportivo Madryn of the third tier signed Piñero da Silva. He scored three braces whilst with the Puerto Madryn outfit, one in a victory over Deportivo Roca and on separate occasions at home against Villa Mitre.

Piñero da Silva agreed terms with Cipolletti in July 2017. He scored eleven times, four in the Copa Argentina, throughout the 2017–18 Torneo Federal A, though would depart towards the end after signing for Bolivian Primera División team Nacional Potosí. He didn't appear in the league for them, though did make appearances in the Copa Sudamericana versus Fluminense. Piñero da Silva returned to Argentina with Barracas Central on 7 July 2018; just three months after signing for Nacional Potosí. He made his bow on 25 August versus Almirante Brown. They were promoted to tier two in his first year.

== Career statistics ==
As of 4 May 2019.

Appearances and goals by club, season and competition
Club	Season	League			Cup		League Cup		Continental		Other		Total	
Club	Season	Division	Apps	Goals	Apps	Goals	Apps	Goals	Apps	Goals	Apps	Goals	Apps	Goals
CAI	2008–09	Primera B Nacional	29	5	0	0	—		—		0	0	29	5
CAI	2009–10	Primera B Nacional	27	12	0	0	—		—		0	0	27	12
CAI	Total		56	17	0	0	—		—		0	0	56	17
Godoy Cruz	2010–11	Argentine Primera División	4	0	0	0	—		—		0	0	4	0
Godoy Cruz	2011–12	Argentine Primera División	0	0	0	0	—		0	0	0	0	0	0
Godoy Cruz	Total		4	0	0	0	—		0	0	0	0	4	0
Aldosivi (loan)	2011–12	Primera B Nacional	28	7	1	1	—		—		0	0	29	8
Patronato	2012–13	Primera B Nacional	11	0	1	0	—		—		0	0	12	0
CAI	2013–14	Torneo Argentino A	28	15	0	0	—		—		4 (Note: Appearance(s) in the Torneo Argentino A play-offs)	2	32	17
Guaraní Antonio Franco	2014	Primera B Nacional	13	3	0	0	—		—		0	0	13	3
Guaraní Antonio Franco	2015	Primera B Nacional	20	2	0	0	—		—		0	0	20	2
Guaraní Antonio Franco	Total		33	5	0	0	—		—		0	0	33	5
Deportivo Madryn	2016	Torneo Federal A	10	8	1	1	—		—		1 (Note: Appearance(s) in the Torneo Federal A play-offs)	0	12	9
Deportivo Madryn	2016–17	Torneo Federal A	21	9	1	1	—		—		2	1	24	11
Deportivo Madryn	Total		31	17	2	2	—		—		3	1	36	20
Cipolletti	2017–18	Torneo Federal A	23	7	4	4	—		—		0	0	27	11
Nacional Potosí	2018	Bolivian Primera División	0	0	0	0	—		2 (Note: Appearance(s) in the Copa Sudamericana)	0	0	0	2	0
Barracas Central	2018–19	Primera B Metropolitana	10	0	0	0	—		—		0	0	10	0
Career total			231	71	8	7	—		2	0	0	0	241	78

== Honours ==
Barracas Central

- Primera B Metropolitana: 2018–19
