= Ernesto Javier Gómez Barrales =

Mexican politician

- Born: 7 November 1978 (age 47); Puebla, Mexico
- Occupation: Politician
- Political party: PAN

Ernesto Javier Gómez Barrales (born 7 November 1978) is a Mexican politician from the National Action Party. In 2009 he served in the Chamber of Deputies to represent Puebla's 9th district as the alternate of Violeta Lagunes Viveros.
