= 9th federal electoral district of Puebla =

Federal electoral district of Mexico

Puebla's 9th
- Electoral district of the Chamber of Deputies of Mexico

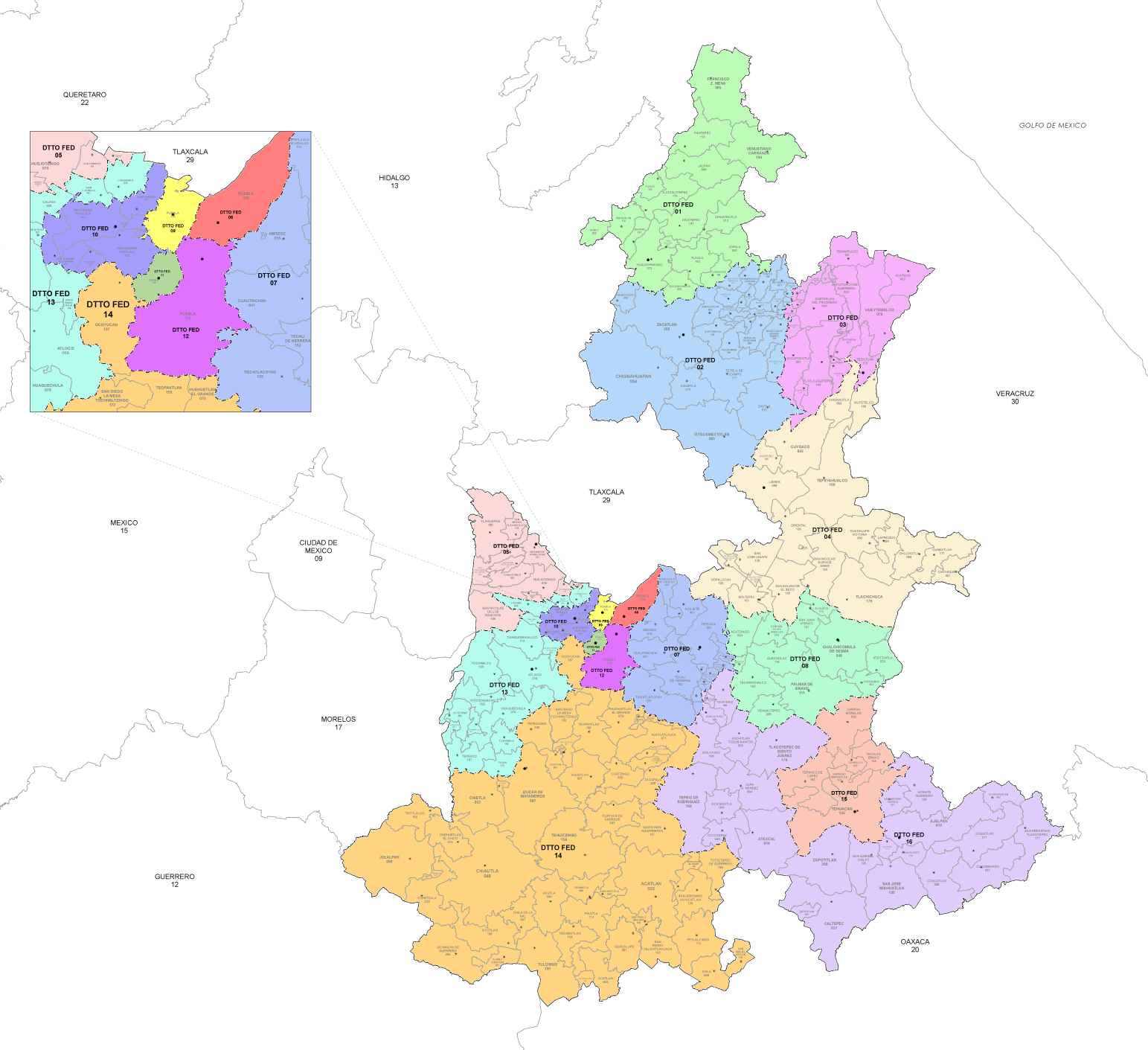
- 9th district since 2023

Incumbent
- Member: José Antonio Gali López
- Party: ▌Ecologist Green Party
- Congress: 66th (2024–2027)

District
- State: Puebla
- Head town: Puebla de Zaragoza
- Coordinates: 19°02′N 98°11′W
- Covers: Municipalities of Puebla (part) and Cuautlancingo (all)
- PR region: Fourth
- Precincts: 252
- Population: 423,750 (2020 census)

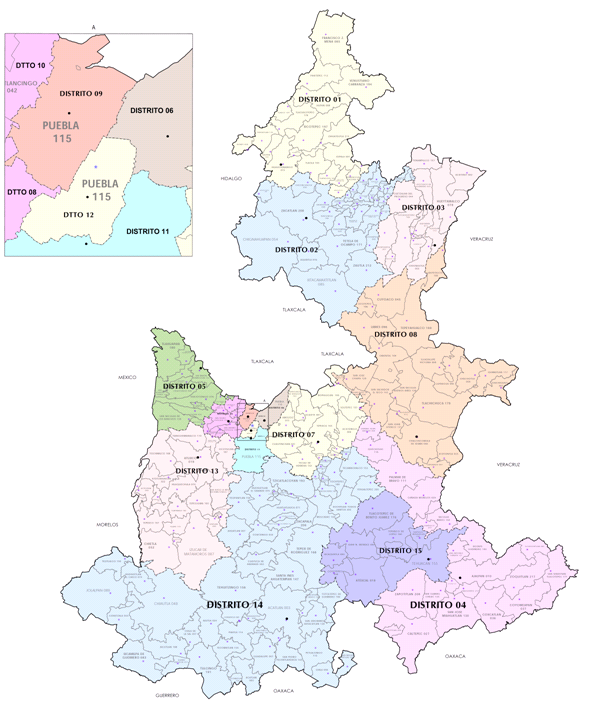
Puebla's districts in 2017–2022

The 9th federal electoral district of Puebla (Spanish: Distrito electoral federal 09 de Puebla) is one of the 300 electoral districts into which Mexico is divided for elections to the federal Chamber of Deputies and one of 16 such districts in the state of Puebla.

It elects one deputy to the lower house of Congress for each three-year legislative session by means of the first-past-the-post system. Votes cast in the district also count towards the calculation of proportional representation ("plurinominal") deputies elected from the fourth region.

The current member for the district, elected in the 2024 general election, is José Antonio Gali López of the Ecologist Green Party of Mexico (PVEM).

== District territory ==
Under the 2023 districting plan adopted by the National Electoral Institute (INE), which is to be used for the 2024, 2027 and 2030 federal elections, Puebla's congressional seat allocation rose from 15 to 16. The 9th district covers 252 electoral precincts (secciones electorales) across two of the state's municipalities:

- Puebla (partial: 251 precincts) and Cuautlancingo (complete: 1 precinct). (Note: The 6th, 7th, 11th and 12th districts cover the remainder of the municipality of Puebla.)

The head town (cabecera distrital), where results from individual polling stations are gathered together and tallied, is the state capital, the city of Puebla. The district reported a population of 423,750 in the 2020 census.

== Previous districting schemes ==
Evolution of electoral district numbers
	1974	1978	1996	2005	2017	2023
Puebla	10	14	15	16	15	16
Chamber of Deputies	196	300				

2017–2022

From 2017 to 2022, when Puebla was assigned 15 congressional seats, the district's head town was the city of Puebla and it covered 199 precincts in the municipality of Puebla and the entirety (one precinct) of Cuautlancingo.

2005–2017

Under the 2005 plan, the district was one of 16 in Puebla. Its head town was the state capital and it covered 178 precincts in the municipality of Puebla and Cuautlancingo's sole precinct.

1996–2005

Between 1996 and 2005, Puebla had 15 districts. The 9th covered 192 precincts in the municipality of Puebla, with its head town at the city of Puebla.

1978–1996

The districting scheme in force from 1978 to 1996 was the result of the 1977 electoral reforms, which increased the number of single-member seats in the Chamber of Deputies from 196 to 300. Under that plan, Puebla's seat allocation rose from 10 to 14. The 9th district's head town was at Chignahuapan in the state's Sierra Norte region and it comprised 31 municipalities.

== Deputies returned to Congress ==
(Mexico) National parties
- Current
- PAN
- PRI
- PT
- PVEM
- MC
- Morena
- PAZ
- Somos
- Defunct or local only
- PLM
- PNR
- PRM
- PNM
- PP
- PPS
- PARM
- PFCRN
- CON
- PANAL
- PSD
- PES
- PES
- PRD

Puebla's 9th district
Election	Deputy	Party	Term	Legislature
1916	Epigmenio Martínez		1916–1917	Constituent Congress of Querétaro
...
1979	Constantino Sánchez Romano	Institutional Revolutionary Party	1979–1982	51st Congress
1982	Luis Aguilar Cerón	Institutional Revolutionary Party	1982–1985	52nd Congress
1985	Modesto Heriberto Morales Arroyo	Institutional Revolutionary Party	1985–1988	53rd Congress
1988	Alejandro Paredes Jurado	Institutional Revolutionary Party	1988–1991	54th Congress
1991	Jorge René Sánchez Juárez	Institutional Revolutionary Party	1991–1994	55th Congress
1994	Matilde del Mar Hidalgo y García Barna	Institutional Revolutionary Party	1994–1997	56th Congress
1997	Víctor Manuel Carreto Fernández de Lara	Institutional Revolutionary Party	1997–2000	57th Congress
2000	José Ramón Mantilla y González de la Llave	National Action Party (Mexico)	2000–2003	58th Congress
2003	José Felipe Puelles Espina	National Action Party (Mexico)	2003–2006	59th Congress
2006	Violeta del Pilar Lagunes Viveros (Note: Lagunes Viveros resigned her seat on 2 April 2009.); Ernesto Javier Gómez Barrales	National Action Party (Mexico)	2006–2009; 2009	60th Congress
2009	Blanca Estela Jiménez Hernández	Institutional Revolutionary Party	2009–2012	61st Congress
2012	Blanca Jiménez Castillo	National Action Party (Mexico)	2012–2015	62nd Congress
2015	Genoveva Huerta Villegas	National Action Party (Mexico)	2015–2018	63rd Congress
2018	José Guillermo Aréchiga Santamaría	National Regeneration Movement	2018–2021	64th Congress
2021	Ana Teresa Aranda Orozco	National Action Party (Mexico)	2021–2024	65th Congress
2024	José Antonio Gali López	Ecologist Green Party of Mexico	2024–2027	66th Congress

== Presidential elections ==
Puebla's 9th district
Election	District won by	Party or coalition	%
2018	Andrés Manuel López Obrador	Juntos Haremos Historia	60.8250
2024	Claudia Sheinbaum Pardo	Sigamos Haciendo Historia	56.5674
