= Blanca Estela Jiménez Hernández =

Mexican politician

- Born: 30 November 1964 (age 61); Puebla, Puebla, Mexico
- Occupation: Politician
- Political party: PRI

Blanca Estela Jiménez Hernández (born 30 November 1964) is a Mexican politician from the Institutional Revolutionary Party (PRI). In the 2009 mid-terms she was elected to the Chamber of Deputies to represent Puebla's 9th district during the 61st session of Congress.
