= Cristián Taborda =

Argentine footballer

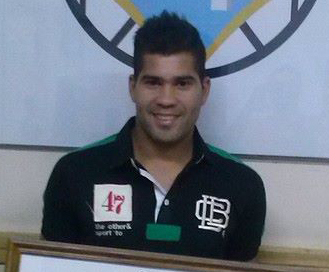
- Taborda signing with Gimnasia de Mendoza in 2013.

Personal information
- Full name: Cristián Daniel Taborda
- Date of birth: 28 July 1988 (age 38)
- Place of birth: Santa Fe, Argentina
- Height: 1.88 m (6 ft 2 in)
- Position: Striker

Team information
- Current team: Ferro Carril Sud

Senior career*
Years	Team	Apps	(Gls)
2008–2009	Unión Santa Fe	14	(0)
2010	Deportivo Roca	28	(17)
2010	Crucero del Norte	6	(0)
2011	Rivadavia de Lincoln	1	(0)
2011–2012	Deportivo Roca	29	(28)
2012	San Luis	14	(5)
2012	Central Córdoba	7	(0)
2013	Villa Dálmine	13	(2)
2013	Barracas Central	6	(0)
2014–2015	Gimnasia de Mendoza	27	(4)
2016	Cipolletti	22	(10)
2017	Cartaginés	5	(0)
2017–2018	Ferro General Pico	20	(3)
2018	Deportivo Sanarate	7	(2)
2018	Racing de Córdoba	4	(0)
2019	Atlético Paraná	7	(2)
2019–2020	San Martín Formosa	15	(3)
2020–2021	Deportivo Maipú	8	(2)
2021	Sportivo Peñarol	3	(2)
2021–2022	Cipolletti	28	(7)
2023	Círculo Deportivo NO	7	(0)
2023–2024	Defensores de La Boca	8	(1)
2024	Sportivo Belgrano	9	(0)
2024	Independiente Chivilcoy	11	(3)
2024–	Ferro Carril Sud	0	(0)
- * Club domestic league appearances and goals as of 28 September 2024

Cristián Daniel Taborda (born July 21, 1988, in Santa Fe, Argentina) is an Argentine footballer who plays as a striker for Ferro Carril Sud.

== Club career ==
Taborda has played tournaments as the Primera B Nacional with Unión de Santa Fe (where his career began in 2009) and Gimnasia Mendoza (2015). The Primera B Metropolitana with Villa Dálmine (2013) and Barracas Central (2013). The Torneo Argentino B with Deportivo Roca (2010 and 2011–2012) and Gimnasia Mendoza (2014) and Torneo Argentino A with Crucero del Norte (2010), Rivadavia de Lincoln (2011) and Gimnasia Mendoza (2014). Also the Primera B de Chile with San Luis de Quillota (2012).

In February 2024, Taborda joined Sportivo Belgrano. In September of the same year, he joined Ferro Carril Sud from Independiente de Chivilcoy.
