= César Montiglio =

Argentine footballer

Cesar Javier Montiglio (born 22 August 1984) is an Argentine former professional footballer who played as a midfielder.

== Career ==
Born in Yerba Buena, Tucumán, Montiglio began playing professional football with local side Club Atlético Tucumán. He made appearances for the club in Torneo Argentino A, Primera B Nacional and the Argentine Primera División. Former manager Héctor Rivoira signed him on loan at Club Atlético Huracán in June 2010.

== Teams ==
| Team | Year | Matches | Goal |
|---|---|---|---|
| Atlético Tucumán | 2004–2010 | 147 | 7 |
| Huracán | 2010–2011 | 25 | 2 |
| Atlético Tucumán | 2011–2013 | 53 | 8 |
| CA Mitre | 2014–2015 | 9 | 1 |
| Juventud Antoniana | 2015- | 6 | 0 |
