= Gustavo Abregú =

Argentine footballer

Personal information
- Full name: Gustavo Ariel Abregú
- Date of birth: 4 July 1997 (age 29)
- Place of birth: San Pablo, Argentina
- Height: 1.70 m (5 ft 7 in)
- Position: Centre-back

Team information
- Current team: Instituto
- Number: 55

Youth career
- San Martín Tucumán

Senior career*
Years	Team	Apps	(Gls)
2016–2026	San Martín Tucumán	123	(2)
2026–	Instituto	14	(0)
- * Club domestic league appearances and goals as of 18:18, 10 May 2026 (UTC)

Gustavo Ariel Abregú (born 4 July 1997) is an Argentine professional footballer who plays as a centre-back for Instituto.

== Career ==
Abregú's career began with San Martín. He was selected in three fixtures during the 2016 Torneo Federal A, which ended with promotion to Primera B Nacional. Two campaigns later, San Martín were promoted to the Argentine Primera División; though Abregú had only featured once in the prior two seasons. Abregú made his bow in the Primera División against Gimnasia y Esgrima in September 2018.

== Personal life ==
Abregú's brother, César, is also a footballer; he too played for San Martín.

== Career statistics ==
As of 4 October 2018.

Club statistics
Club	Season	League			Cup (Note: Includes the Copa Argentina)		League Cup		Continental		Other		Total	
Club	Season	Division	Apps	Goals	Apps	Goals	Apps	Goals	Apps	Goals	Apps	Goals	Apps	Goals
San Martín	2016	Torneo Federal A	3	0	0	0	—		—		0	0	3	0
San Martín	2016–17	Primera B Nacional	1	0	0	0	—		—		0	0	1	0
San Martín	2017–18	Primera B Nacional	0	0	0	0	—		—		0	0	0	0
San Martín	2018–19	Primera División	2	0	0	0	—		—		0	0	2	0
Career total			6	0	0	0	—		—		0	0	6	0

== Honours ==
San Martín

- Torneo Federal A: 2016
