= Juventud Antoniana =

Argentine football club

- Full name: Centro Juventud Antoniana
- Nickname: Santo
- Founded: 12 January 1916; 110 years ago
- Ground: Estadio Padre Ernesto Martearena, Salta; Salta Province, Argentina
- Capacity: 20,408
- Chairman: Gustavo Klix
- Manager: Iván Delfino
- League: Torneo Argentino A
- 2011–12: 14th
- Website: https://web.archive.org/web/20090510025138/http://www.juventudantonianadesalta.com/
Home colours	Away colours

Centro Juventud Antoniana is an Argentine football club from the city of Salta. The team currently plays in Torneo Regional Federal Amateur, the regionalised division of the Argentine football league system.

Juventud Antoniana played in Primera División 6 times: 1971, 1973, 1975, 1978, 1983 and 1985. Its best performance came in 1983, when the squad progressed to the 2nd round.

== Current squad ==
Note: Flags indicate national team as defined under FIFA eligibility rules; some limited exceptions apply. Players may hold more than one non-FIFA nationality.

No.	Pos.	Nation	Player
—	GK	ARG	Mariano Maino
—	GK	ARG	Juan Cruz Mulieri
—	GK	ARG	Fabio Quiroga
—	DF	ARG	Gastón Stang
—	DF	ARG	Maximiliano Aybar
—	DF	ARG	Juan Pablo Cárdenas
—	DF	ARG	Raúl Gorostegui
—	DF	ARG	Omar Bellone
—	DF	ARG	Edgardo Galíndez
—	DF	ARG	Facundo Girón
—	DF	ARG	Jesus Calderón
—	DF	ARG	Sergio Chavez
—	DF	ARG	Rodrigo Teruel
—	DF	ARG	Jorge Serrano
—	MF	ARG	Diago Gimenez
—	MF	ARG	Oscar Domínguez

No.	Pos.	Nation	Player
—	MF	ARG	Matías Ceballos
—	MF	ARG	César Montiglio
—	MF	ARG	Maximiliano Ramos
—	MF	ARG	Nicolás Gastón Aguirre
—	MF	ARG	Julio Marchant
—	MF	ARG	Ricardo Ernesto Gómez
—	MF	ARG	Gustavo Ortiz
—	MF	ARG	Hector Lopez
—	FW	ARG	Joaquin Quinteros
—	MF	ARG	Gustavo Ibáñez
—	FW	ARG	Gustavo Balvorín
—	FW	ARG	Marcos Navarro
—	FW	ARG	Gabriel Perez Tarifa
—	FW	ARG	Martin Esparza
—	FW	ARG	Sebastián Keber

== Honours ==
=== National ===
- Torneo Argentino A
  - Winners (2): 1995–96, 1997–98
- Torneo Regional Federal Amateur
  - Winners (1): 2021–22

=== Regional ===
- Liga Salteña de Fútbol
  - Winners (21): 1928, 1929, 1930, 1931, 1933, 1934, 1935, 1938, 1953, 1957, 1967, 1970, 1972, 1974, 1975, 1987, 1988, 1991, 1994, 1995, 2021
- Copa Confraternidad Salta-Jujuy
  - Winners (5): 1984, 1988, 1990, 1992, 1999
