= César Abregú =

Argentine footballer

Personal information
- Full name: César Daniel Abregú
- Date of birth: 23 October 1994 (age 32)
- Place of birth: San Miguel de Tucumán, Argentina
- Position: Midfielder

Team information
- Current team: Deportivo La Merced

Youth career
- 2011–2015: San Martín

Senior career*
Years	Team	Apps	(Gls)
2015–2017	San Martín	28	(0)
2017–2018	San Jorge	12	(0)
2019	Atlético Concepción	6	(0)
2020–	Deportivo La Merced	5	(0)
- * Club domestic league appearances and goals as of 19:26, 5 July 2020 (UTC)

César Daniel Abregú (born 23 October 1994) is an Argentine professional footballer who plays as a midfielder for Deportivo La Merced.

== Career ==
Abregú's first senior career team was San Martín; he joined their system in 2011. He remained with the club for six seasons, debuting in 2015 versus Chaco For Ever in Torneo Federal A on 28 August. Overall, he participated in thirty-four matches for the club; including in Primera B Nacional after San Martín were promoted in 2016. On 31 July 2017, Torneo Federal A side San Jorge signed Abregú. Fourteen appearances followed in all competitions, which preceded his departure in June 2018. January 2019 saw Abregú move to Atlético Concepción of the inaugural Torneo Regional Federal Amateur; a fourth tier.

In 2020, Abregú moved to Deportivo La Merced.

== Personal life ==
Abregú is the brother of fellow footballer Gustavo Abregú, who also started his career with San Martín.

== Career statistics ==
As of 5 July 2020.

Club statistics
Club	Season	League			Cup		Continental		Other		Total	
Club	Season	Division	Apps	Goals	Apps	Goals	Apps	Goals	Apps	Goals	Apps	Goals
San Martín	2015	Torneo Federal A	6	0	0	0	—		0	0	6	0
San Martín	2016	Torneo Federal A	2	0	0	0	—		6 (Note: Appearance(s) in the Torneo Federal A play-offs)	0	8	0
San Martín	2016–17	Primera B Nacional	20	0	0	0	—		0	0	20	0
San Martín	Total		28	0	0	0	—		6	0	34	0
San Jorge	2017–18	Torneo Federal A	12	0	2	0	—		0	0	14	0
Atlético Concepción	2019	Federal Amateur	6	0	0	0	—		0	0	6	0
Deportivo La Merced	2020	Federal Amateur	5	0	0	0	—		0	0	5	0
Career total			51	0	2	0	—		6	0	59	0

== Honours ==
San Martín

- Torneo Federal A: 2016
