= José Guillermo Aréchiga =

Mexican independent politician

- Born: 2 September 1958 (age 67); Puebla, Puebla, Mexico
- Occupation: Politician
- Political party: Independent

José Guillermo Aréchiga Santamaría (born 2 September 1958) is a Mexican politician who has belonged to both the Institutional Revolutionary Party (PRI) and the National Regeneration Movement (Morena).

In the 2003 mid-terms he was elected to the Chamber of Deputies to represent Puebla's 2nd district for the PRI during the 59th Congress. Fifteen years later, in the 2018 general election, he was elected to the Chamber of Deputies for Morena to represent Puebla's 9th district during the 64th Congress.
