= Alejandro Kruchowski =

Argentine footballer (born 1983)

Personal information
- Full name: Alejandro Matías Kruchowski
- Date of birth: 20 January 1983 (age 43)
- Place of birth: Buenos Aires, Argentina
- Height: 1.78 m (5 ft 10 in)
- Position: Defender

Youth career
- River Plate

Senior career*
Years	Team	Apps	(Gls)
2003–2004	River Plate	0	(0)
2004	Querétaro	12	(0)
2005	Atlanta	0	(0)
2007	Sol de América Formosa	4	(1)
2008–2010	Santiago Morning	44	(2)
2010	Astra Ploieşti	4	(0)
2010–2011	Cobreloa	17	(1)
2011	Aldosivi	11	(0)
2011	Curicó Unido	12	(0)
2012–2015	Estudiantes BA	31	(0)
2016–2017	Argentino de Merlo	28	(0)
2017–2019	Defensores Unidos	48	(0)
2019–2020	Midland	16	(0)
Total		227	(4)
- * Club domestic league appearances and goals

Alejandro Matías Kruchowski (born 20 January 1983) is an Argentine former professional footballer who played as a defender.

== Career ==
Kruchowski was born in Buenos Aires, Argentina. He started his career at one of the most popular teams in Argentina, River Plate of the Argentine First Division. In 2004, he was signed by Querétaro FC of the Primera División Mexicana, but in 2005 he returned in Argentina being signed by Atlanta.

In 2006 Kruchowski stayed as free agent, but in 2007 he was signed by the Paraguayan club Sol de América, but he played only one season, after that he again became a free agent in the first semester of 2008.

In the middle of 2008 Kruchowski signed for Santiago Morning, in his first season he played a total of 16 matches and scored a total of 2 goals, in his second season he had a good performance, although he scored only one goal in that season.

In 2010 Kruchowski joined Astra Ploieşti in Romania and was transferred to Cobreloa later that year.

His last clubs were Defensores Unidos and Midland.
