= Blanca Jiménez Castillo =

Mexican politician

- Born: 26 September 1965 (age 60); Puebla, Puebla, Mexico
- Occupation: Politician
- Political party: PAN

Blanca Jiménez Castillo (born 26 September 1965) is a Mexican politician affiliated with the National Action Party (PAN). In the 2012 general election she was elected to the Chamber of Deputies to represent Puebla's 9th district during the 62nd session of Congress.
