= Vicente Muñoz Puelles =

Spanish author and translator

- Born: 1948 (age 77–78); Valencia
- Occupations: Writer, translator

Vicente Muñoz Puelles (born 1948) is a Spanish author and translator. He has published over 240 books, including over 180 for children and young adults, as well as almost 500 articles on literary criticism and fiction.

== Life and work ==
Muñoz Puelles is the nephew of Spanish film director, screenwriter, and producer Ricardo Muñoz Suay.

Prior to his writing career, he taught biological sciences at the University of Valencia. From 1999 to 2018, he was a member of the Valencian Council of Culture.

One of Muñoz Puelles' novels, Parallel Shadows, was made into a movie in 1995. His works have been translated into many languages, and 22 of his books can be found in the United States Library of Congress.

== Prizes ==
- 1980: Premio La Sonrisa Vertical De Narrativa Erótica
- 1982: Premio De La Crítica De La Comunidad Valenciana De Novela
- 1984: Premio Ciudad De Valencia De Novela
- 1986: Premio De La Crítica De La Comunidad Valenciana De Novela
- 1987: Premio Ciudad De Valencia De Novela
- 1994: Prix Littéraire Ascension Pour La Lecture
- 1993: Premio Azorín
- 1998: Premio Vila De Mislata De Narrativa Corta
- 1999: Premio Nacional De Literatura Infantil Y Juvenil
- 2000: Premi De Teatre Eduard Escalante Dels Premis Literaris Ciutat De València
- 2001: Premio Ciutat De València De Teatro
- 2002: Premio Ciudad De Alicante De Álbum Infantil Ilustrado
- 2002: Premio Alfons El Magnànim “Valencia” De Narrativa En Castellano
- 2004: Premio Alandar De Literatura Juvenil
- 2004: Premio Anaya De Narrativa Infantil Y Juvenil
- 2005: Premio Libreros De Asturias
- 2011: Banco del Libro de Venezuela
- 2014: Premio Anaya En Su Edición XI, De Literatura Infantil Y Juvenil
- 2018: Premio De Las Letras De Generalitat Valenciana

== Publications ==
=== Novels ===
- Anacaona, 1980
- Amor Burgués, 1982
- Campos De Marte, 1985
- Tierra De Humo, 1986
- La Noche De Los Tiempos, 1987
- Sombras Paralelas, 1989
- Las Ruinas De Nínive, 1990
- El Último Manuscrito De Hernando Colón, 1992
- Tierra De Humo, 1992
- Huellas En La Nieve, 1993
- La Ciudad En Llamas, 1993
- La Emperatriz Eugenia En Zululandia, 1994
- Amantes Artificiales, 1995
- La Curvatura Del Empeine, 1996
- El Último Capricho De Francisco Goya, 1997
- El Cráneo De Goya, 1997
- El Caballo Rojo, 1999
- El Piloto Y El Arca, 2001
- La Ciudad De Los Murciélagos, 2001
- El Tajo De Roldán, 2001
- Los Amantes De La Niebla, 2002
- Manzanas (Tratado De Pomofilia), 2002
- Las Desventuras De Un Escritor En Provincias, 2003
- El Último Deseo Del Jíbaro Y Otras Fantasmagorías, 2003
- El Cráneo De Goya, 2004
- El Legado De Hipatia, 2007
- 2083, 2008 (in Catalan), 2009 (in Valencian), 2010 (in Spanish)

=== Young adult fiction ===
- El Tigre De Tasmania, 1988 (translated into Valencian in 1999)
- Yo, Colón, Descubridor Del Paraíso Terrenal, Almirante De La Mar Océana, Virrey Y Gobernador De Las Indias, 1991
- Yo, Goya, Primer Pintor De La Corte Española, Defensor De La Libertad, Grabador De Sueños Y Caprichos, 1992
- La Isla De Las Sombras Perdidas, 1998
- Las Hadas, 1998
- El Lleopard De Les Neus, 2001
- La Foto De Portobello, 2004
- Portobelloko Argazkia (in Basque), 2005
- ¡Polizón A Bordo! (El Secreto De Colón), 2005
- El Pintor De Las Neuronas (Ramón Y Cajal. Científico), 2006
- El Viaje De La Evolución (El Joven Darwin), 2007
- El Vuelo De La Razón (Goya, Pintor De La Libertad), 2007
- El ayudante de Darwin, 2009
- La Guerra De Amaya, 2010
- La Expedición De Los Libros, 2010 (in Spanish and Catalan)
- 2083, 2010
- El Joven Gulliver, 2011
- El Regreso De Peter Pan, 2011
- Antología Del Humor Español, 2012
- La Fábrica De Betún (El Joven Dickens), 2012
- Canción Para Otra Navidad, 2012
- El Rayo Azul, 2014
- Cuentos y leyendas del Mar, 2014
- Fantasmas Y Aparecidos. Antología De Relatos Españoles De Misterio, 2014
- La Voz Del Árbol, 2014
- La Velocidad De La Luz, 2015
- El Misterio Del Cisne, 2016
- Cuentos y leyendas de la Tierra, 2016
- El Despertar De Cervantes, 2016
- La Amada Inmortal, 2017
- Cuentos Y Leyendas De Las Matemáticas, 2017
- El Último Manuscrito De Blasco Ibáñez, 2017
- La Isla De Los Libros Andantes, 2018
- La Niña el Clima
- Sherlock Holmes Y Yo, 2021

=== Translations and adaptations ===
- Ilíada. Odisea. Eneida, 2015
- Don Quijote de la Mancha, 2015
- Escalofríos. Relatos Clásicos Del Más Allá, 2015
- Don Álvaro O La Fuerza Del Sino, 2020

=== Adaptations for young adults and children ===
- Diario De A Bordo, by Cristóbal Colón, 1984
- Juventud Y La Línea De Sombra, by Joseph Conrad, 1989
- Naufragios Y Comentarios, by Cabeza De Vaca, 1992
- El Último Mohicano, by James Fenimore Cooper, 1996
- Las Aventuras De Sherlock Holmes, by Arthur Conan Doyle, 2001
- El Hombre Invisible, by H. G. Wells, 2002
- Moonfleet, by John Meade Falkner, 2002
- El Forastero Misterioso, by Mark Twain, 2002
- Un Libro Maravilloso, by Nathaniel Hawthorne, 2002
- El Sabueso De Los Baskerville, by Arthur Conan Doyle, 2002
- Juventud Y La Línea De Sombra, by Joseph Conrad, 2003
- Miguel Strogoff, by Jules Verne, 2004
- El Último Saludo De Sherlock Holmes, by Arthur Conan Doyle, 2004
- Don Quijote Para Niños, 2004
- La Biblia Para Niños, 2005
- El Archivo De Sherlock Holmes, by Arthur Conan Doyle, 2005
- La Esfinge De Los Hielos, by Jules Verne, 2005
- Don Quijote De La Mancha, 2005
- El Cantar De Mío Cid, 2006
- Las Memorias De Sherlock Holmes, by Arthur Conan Doyle, 2007
- El Regreso De Sherlock Holmes, by Arthur Conan Doyle, 2008
- Catriona, by Robert Louis Stevenson, 2009
- Historias De Dragones, by E. Nesbit, 2009
- La Dama De Las Camelias, by Alexandre Dumas, 2009
- Cuentos Españoles De Terror, by Various Authors, 2010
- La Vida De Lazarillo De Tormes, 2010
- Leyendas De Mío Cid, 2010
- Novelas Ejemplares, by Miguel De Cervantes, 2010
- Leyendas, by Gustavo Adolfo Bécquer, 2010
- La Invención Del Fantasma. Introducción Y Apéndice De El Fantasma De La Ópera, by Gaston Leroux, 2011
- Regreso A Croydon. Introducción Y Apéndice De Oliver Twist, by Charles Dickens, 2011
- Cuentos De Fantasmas, by Various Authors, 2011
- Cuentos Policiacos, Various Authors, 2011
- Cuentos De Humor Español, Various Authors, 2012
- Cuentos De Vampiros, Various Authors, 2012
- El Deseo De Ser Leído. Apéndice De Fábulas, by Samaniego, 2012
- Una Vida Prestada. Apéndice De Cuentos De Lo Sobrenatural, by Charles Dickens, 2012
- La Celestina, De Fernando De Rojas, 2016
- Cuentos De Fantasmas, 2017
- Mi Primera Biblia, 2017
- Drácula, by Bram Stoker, 2017 (Catalan translation also published in 2017)
- Metamorfosis, by Ovid, 2018

=== For children ===
- Los Sueños De Axel, 1987
- La Constel·Lació Del Drac, 1987
- Óscar Y El León De Correos, 1998
- Laura Y El Ratón, 2000
- Laura I El Ratolí (in Valencian), 2000
- Sombras De Manos, 2002
- Ricardo Y El Dinosaurio Rojo, 2003
- El Sueño Del Libro, 2004
- El Arca Y Yo, 2004
- La Sombra De Laura, 2005
- L'ombra De Laura (in Valencian), 2005
- L'ombra De Laura (in Catalan), 2005
- A Sombra De Laura (in Galician)
- La Luz Del Faro, 2005
- La Perrona, 2006
- L'arca I Jo (in Valencian), 2006
- Niños De Todo El Mundo, 2006
- Nens I Nenes De Tot El Món (in Catalan), 2006
- Xiquets De Tot El Món (in Valencian), 2006
- Nenas e nenos Do Mundo (in Galician), 2006
- Los Animales De La Ciudad, 2006
- Os Animais Da Didade (in Galician), 2006
- La Rana Rony, 2007
- La Granota Roc-I-Roc (in Catalan), 2007
- El Sueño De Peter, 2007
- Óscar Y El Río Amazonas, 2009
- Òscar I El Riu Amazones (in Valencian), 2009
- El Somni Del Ilibre, 2010 (in Catalan)
- Els Animals De La Ciutat, 2006 (in Catalan)
- La Gata Que Aprendió A Escribir, 2012
- Tu Primera Biblia, 2014
- La Torre De Babel, 2017
- Laura Y El Oso Polar, 2018
- Ciudades Perdidas, 2019
- Lazarillo de Tormes
- Ricardo Y El Gato Con Motas, 2019
- La Ciudad De Las Estatuas, 2020
- Mi Primer Libro Sobre Los Juegos Olímpicos, 2020
- Un Recorrido Por Los Juegos Olímpicos, 2020
- Mi Primer Libro Sobre Egipto, 2021
- Egipto Y El Río Nilo, 2021
- Óscar Y El Loro Del Mercado, 2021

=== Other selected works ===
- Zona De Iliure Trànsit, collaboration with Josep Palomero, 2001
- Berlanguiana, 2020
