= Ricardo Gómez (footballer, born 1981) =

Argentine footballer

Personal information
- Full name: Ricardo Ernesto Gómez
- Date of birth: October 23, 1981 (age 45)
- Place of birth: San Miguel de Tucumán, Argentina
- Height: 1.72 m (5 ft 7 1/2 in)
- Position: Left winger

Senior career*
Years	Team	Apps	(Gls)
2003–2006	Juventud Antoniana	98	(6)
2006–2009	Gimnasia de Jujuy	92	(5)
2009–2011	Colón	40	(0)
2011–2012	Rosario Central	39	(2)
2012–2013	Colón	19	(0)
2013–2014	Patronato	30	(0)
2014–2015	Sportivo Belgrano	9	(0)
2015	Chacarita Juniors	3	(0)
2015–2017	Juventud Antoniana	72	(8)
2017	Gutiérrez SC	12	(0)
- * Club domestic league appearances and goals as of 21:46, 3 November 2019 (UTC)

Ricardo Ernesto Gómez (born 23 October 1981 in San Miguel de Tucumán) is an Argentine football midfielder.

== Career ==
Gómez began his playing career in 2003 for Juventud Antoniana in the Argentine 2nd division, after the club were relegated in 2006 he joined Gimnasia y Esgrima de Jujuy where he soon established himself as a regular member of the first team squad.

After the relegation of Gimnasia at the end of the 2008-09 season Gómez joined Colón de Santa Fe.
