= Gastón Stang =

Argentine footballer (born 1973)

Personal information
- Full name: Gastón Felipe Stang
- Date of birth: 2 June 1980 (age 46)
- Place of birth: Argentina
- Position: Defender

Senior career*
Years	Team	Apps	(Gls)
1998–2003	Deportivo Español	41	(4)
2004	Kedah Darul Aman FC		
2004–2005	San Martín de San Juan		
2005–2008	Club Atlético Tigre	49	(0)
2008–2009	Talleres de Córdoba	23	(5)
2010–2011	Atlético Tucumán	15	(1)
2011–2012	Guillermo Brown de Puerto Madryn	25	(0)
2012–2015	Club Sportivo Estudiantes	49	(3)
2016	Unión Santiago	2	(0)
2016–2017	Concepción Fútbol Club	10	(0)
2017–2018	Acción Juvenil		
2019	Club Atlético Lambert	9	(0)
- * Club domestic league appearances and goals

Gastón Felipe Stang (born 2 June 1980) is an Argentine former footballer who played as a defender.

== Early life ==
Stang was born in 1980 in Argentina. He worked at a wheel factory as a teenager.

== Career ==
Stang started his career with Argentine side Deportivo Español. In 2004, he signed for Malaysian side Kedah Darul Aman FC. After that, he signed for Argentine side San Martín de San Juan. In 2005, he signed for Argentine side Club Atlético Tigre. In 2008, he signed for Argentine side Talleres de Córdoba. In 2010, he signed for Argentine side Atlético Tucumán. In 2011, he signed for Argentine side Guillermo Brown de Puerto Madryn. In 2012, he signed for Argentine side Club Sportivo Estudiantes. He helped the club achieve promotion. In 2016, he signed for Argentine side Unión Santiago. After that, he signed for Argentine side Concepción Fútbol Club. In 2017, he signed for Argentine side Acción Juvenil. In 2019, he signed for Argentine side Club Atlético Lambert. He helped the club win the league.

== Personal life ==
Stang has been married. After retiring from professional football, he worked in the pizza industry.
