= Edgardo Galíndez =

Argentine footballer

Edgardo Sebastian Galindez (born 1 December 1982 in San Miguel de Tucumán, Tucumán, Argentina) is an Argentine footballer. He plays as a defender and his current club is the Atlético Tucumán.

== Career ==
He began his career in 2001 playing for Atlético Tucumán. He played for the club until 2004. In 2004, he played for Ferro, where he remained until 2005 . In 2005, he went to Aldosivi, playing there until 2006. In 2006, he played form Talleres de Córdoba. In 2007, he played for San Martín de Tucumán. In 2007, he returned to Talleres de Córdoba, leaving in 2010. In 2010, he played for University Juventud Unida, where he remained until 2011. In 2011, he played for Atlético Tucumán.
