= José Felipe Puelles =

Mexican politician

- Born: 9 November 1960 (age 65); Puebla, Mexico
- Education: UDLAP
- Occupation: Politician
- Political party: PAN

José Felipe Puelles Espina (born 9 November 1960) is a Mexican politician affiliated with the National Action Party (PAN). In the 2003 mid-terms he was elected to the Chamber of Deputies to represent Puebla's 9th district during the 59th session of Congress.
