= Ezequiel Barrionuevo =

Argentine footballer

Personal information
- Full name: Ezequiel Alejandro Barrionuevo
- Date of birth: August 14, 1986 (age 40)
- Place of birth: Cruz del Eje, Argentina
- Height: 1.76 m (5 ft 9 in)
- Position: Midfielder

Youth career
- Talleres

Senior career*
Years	Team	Apps	(Gls)
2003–2007	Talleres	26	(1)
2006–2007	→ Villa Mitre (loan)	19	(2)
2008	Santiago Wanderers	36	(0)
2009–2010	Gimnasia de Jujuy	6	(0)
2010–2013	Sportivo Belgrano	90	(12)
2013–2016	Talleres	67	(11)
2016–2018	Santamarina	50	(2)
2018–2019	Central Córdoba SdE	18	(0)
2019	Atlético Porteño	9	(0)
2020	Estudiantes SL	3	(1)
2020–2021	Gimnasia y Tiro	19	(1)
2023	San Martín La Rioja	–	(–)
2023–2024	Sportivo Belgrano	34	(5)
Total		353	(31)
- * Club domestic league appearances and goals as of 16 October 2024

Ezequiel Alejandro Barrionuevo (born August 14, 1986) is an Argentine footballer who plays as a midfielder. He last played for Sportivo Belgrano.

== Teams ==
- (Argentina) Talleres de Córdoba 2003–2006
- (Argentina) Villa Mitre 2006–2007
- (Argentina) Talleres de Córdoba 2007
- (Chile) Santiago Wanderers 2008
- (Argentina) Gimnasia y Esgrima de Jujuy 2009–2010
- (Argentina) Sportivo Belgrano 2010–2013
- (Argentina) Talleres de Córdoba 2013–2016
- (Argentina) Santamarina 2016–2018
- (Argentina) Central Córdoba de Santiago del Estero 2018–2019
- (Ecuador) Atlético Porteño 2019
- (Argentina) Estudiantes SL 2020
- (Argentina) Gimnasia y Tiro 2021
- (Argentina) San Martín de La Rioja 2023
- (Argentina) Sportivo Belgrano 2023–2024

== Honours ==
Sportivo Belgrano

- Torneo Argentino A: 2013

Talleres

- Torneo Federal A: 2015
- Primera B Nacional: 2016

Central Córdoba (SdE)

- Primera B Nacional: 2019
