= Gustavo Ibáñez =

Argentine footballer

Personal information
- Full name: Gustavo César Ibáñez
- Date of birth: July 30, 1979 (age 47)
- Place of birth: Tucumán, Argentina
- Height: 1.70 m (5 ft 7 in)
- Position: Forward

Youth career
- Villa Rosario
- San Pablo

Senior career*
Years	Team	Apps	(Gls)
1997–2001	San Pablo	–	(–)
2002	Atlético Tucumán	0	(0)
2002–2014	San Martín Tucumán	282	(50)
2006–2007	→ Quilmes (loan)	20	(3)
2010	→ Deportes Iquique (loan)	6	(1)
2014	Sportivo Tintina	6	(1)
2014–2019	Juventud Antoniana	138	(25)
2019	San Pablo	–	(–)
2020	Atlético Concepción	–	(–)
- * Club domestic league appearances and goals

Gustavo César Ibáñez (born July 30, 1979, in Tucumán, Argentina) is an Argentine former association football forward.

== Teams ==
- (Argentina) San Pablo 1997–2001
- (Argentina) Atlético Tucumán 2002
- (Argentina) San Martín de Tucumán 2002–2006
- (Argentina) Quilmes 2006–2007
- (Argentina) San Martín de Tucumán 2007–2009
- (Chile) Deportes Iquique 2010
- (Argentina) San Martín de Tucumán 2010–2014
- (Argentina) Sportivo Tintina 2014
- (Argentina) Juventud Antoniana 2014–2019
- (Argentina) San Pablo 2019
- (Argentina) Atlético Concepción 2020
