= Facundo Zamarián =

Argentine footballer

Personal information
- Date of birth: 25 December 1995 (age 30)
- Place of birth: Salta, Argentina
- Height: 1.81 m (5 ft 11 1/2 in)
- Position: Midfielder

Team information
- Current team: Central Norte (assistant coach)

Youth career
- 2011–2012: Central Norte
- 2012–2016: Boca Juniors

Senior career*
Years	Team	Apps	(Gls)
2016	Boca Juniors	0	(0)
2016	→ Belshina Bobruisk (loan)	9	(1)
2017–2019	Central Norte		
2020	Deportivo La Merced		

Managerial career
- 2022–: Central Norte (assistant)
- * Club domestic league appearances and goals as of 30 December 2016

Facundo Zamarián (born 25 December 1995) is an Argentinian professional football coach and former player. In 2016, he was played for Belshina Bobruisk.

Born in Salta, Zamarian began playing football in the Boca Juniors youth system. He never played for the senior side, and instead spent two seasons with his hometown club Central Norte. He also had a spell in Belarus with FC Belshina Bobruisk.
