= Violeta Lagunes Viveros =

Mexican politician

- Born: 12 October 1971 (age 53); Puebla, Mexico
- Occupation: Politician

Violeta del Pilar Lagunes Viveros (born 12 October 1971) is a Mexican politician affiliated with the National Action Party (PAN). In the 2006 general election she was elected to the Chamber of Deputies to represent Puebla's 9th district during the 60th session of Congress.
