= Agustín Briones =

Argentine footballer

Personal information
- Full name: Agustín Rodrigo Briones
- Date of birth: October 4, 1988 (age 38)
- Place of birth: Avellaneda, Argentina
- Height: 1.80 m (5 ft 11 in)
- Position: Midfielder

Senior career*
Years	Team	Apps	(Gls)
2008–2014	Aldosivi	107	(4)
2014–2015	Deportes Concepción	15	(0)
2015	Mushuc Runa	20	(0)
2016–2017	San Martín Tucumán	39	(1)
2017–2018	Gimnasia de Mendoza	24	(0)
2018	Chaco For Ever	12	(1)
2019	Almirante Brown	18	(0)
2020	Deportivo Riestra	0	(0)
2020–2021	Talleres RdE	5	(0)
2021	Estudiantes SL	9	(0)
2021–2022	Deportivo Camioneros	22	(0)
2022–2023	Akragas	–	(–)
2023–2024	Francavilla	–	(–)
- * Club domestic league appearances and goals as of 21 November 2024

Agustín Rodrigo Briones (born October 4, 1988) is an Argentine football midfielder.

== Teams ==
- (Argentina) Aldosivi 2008–2014
- (Chile) Deportes Concepción 2014–2015
- (Ecuador) Mushuc Runa 2015
- (Argentina) San Martín de Tucumán 2016–2017
- (Argentina) Gimnasia y Esgrima de Mendoza 2017–2018
- (Argentina) Chaco For Ever 2018
- (Argentina) Almirante Brown 2019
- (Argentina) Deportivo Riestra 2020
- (Argentina) Talleres de Remedios de Escalada 2020–2021
- (Argentina) Estudiantes de San Luis 2021
- (Argentina) Deportivo Camioneros 2021–2022
- (Italy) Akragas 2022–2023
- (Italy) Francavilla 2023–2024
