= Pablo Palacios Alvarenga =

Paraguayan footballer (born 1988)

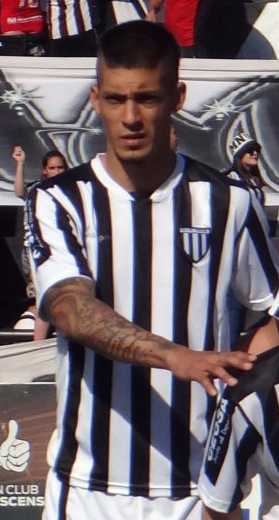
Pablo Palacios Alvarenga (2017).

Pablo Palacios Alvarenga (born 22 June 1988 in Coronel Oviedo, Paraguay) is a Paraguayan association footballer who plays as a striker for Güemes in the Argentine Torneo Federal A.

== Career ==
His debut season was in the 2009 Primera División Paraguaya with Tacuary.

In the 2016/17 season, he signed with Gimnasia y Esgrima de Mendoza in the Argentine Torneo Federal A, when the club came close to obtaining promotion and Alvarenga finished the season as the league's leading goal scorer with 21 goals.
