= Matias Ceballos =

Italian Argentinean footballer

Matías Ceballos
Personal information
- Full name: Matías Gabriel Ceballos
- Date of birth: April 20, 1984 (age 42)
- Place of birth: Argentina
- Height: 1.78 m (5 ft 10 in)
- Positions: Central midfielder; attacking midfielder

Team information
- Current team: Victoriano Arenas

Senior career*
Years	Team	Apps	(Gls)
2006–2007	Colón de Santa Fe		
2008	San Martín		
2009–	Victoriano Arenas		
- * Club domestic league appearances and goals as of August 11, 2009

Matías Gabriel Ceballos (born May 20, 1984) is an Italian Argentinean footballer. In July 2006 he made his debut at Colón de Santa Fe in Argentina.
