= Independiente de Neuquén =

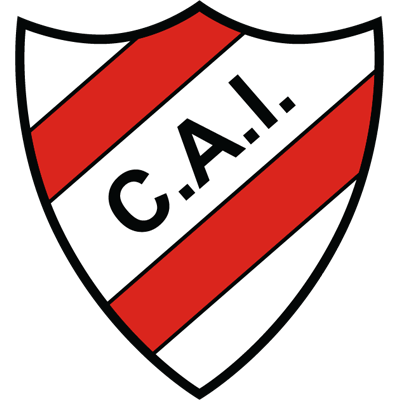
- Full name: Club Atlético Independiente
- Nicknames: Rojo; Albirojo
- Founded: 27 February 1921; 104 years ago
- Ground: José Rosas y Perito Moreno (La Caldera); Neuquén, Argentina
- Capacity: 9,000
- Manager: Gustavo Coronel
- League: Torneo Federal A
Home colours	Away colours

Club Atlético Independiente (more often referred as Independiente de Neuquén) is an Argentine football club based in the city of Neuquén. The squad currently plays in the regionalised 4rd level of Argentine football Torneo Regional Federal Amateur.
