= Pronunciamiento, Entre Ríos =

Coordinates: 32°21′S 58°26′W

Pronunciamiento Villa Maria Luisa
- Municipality and village
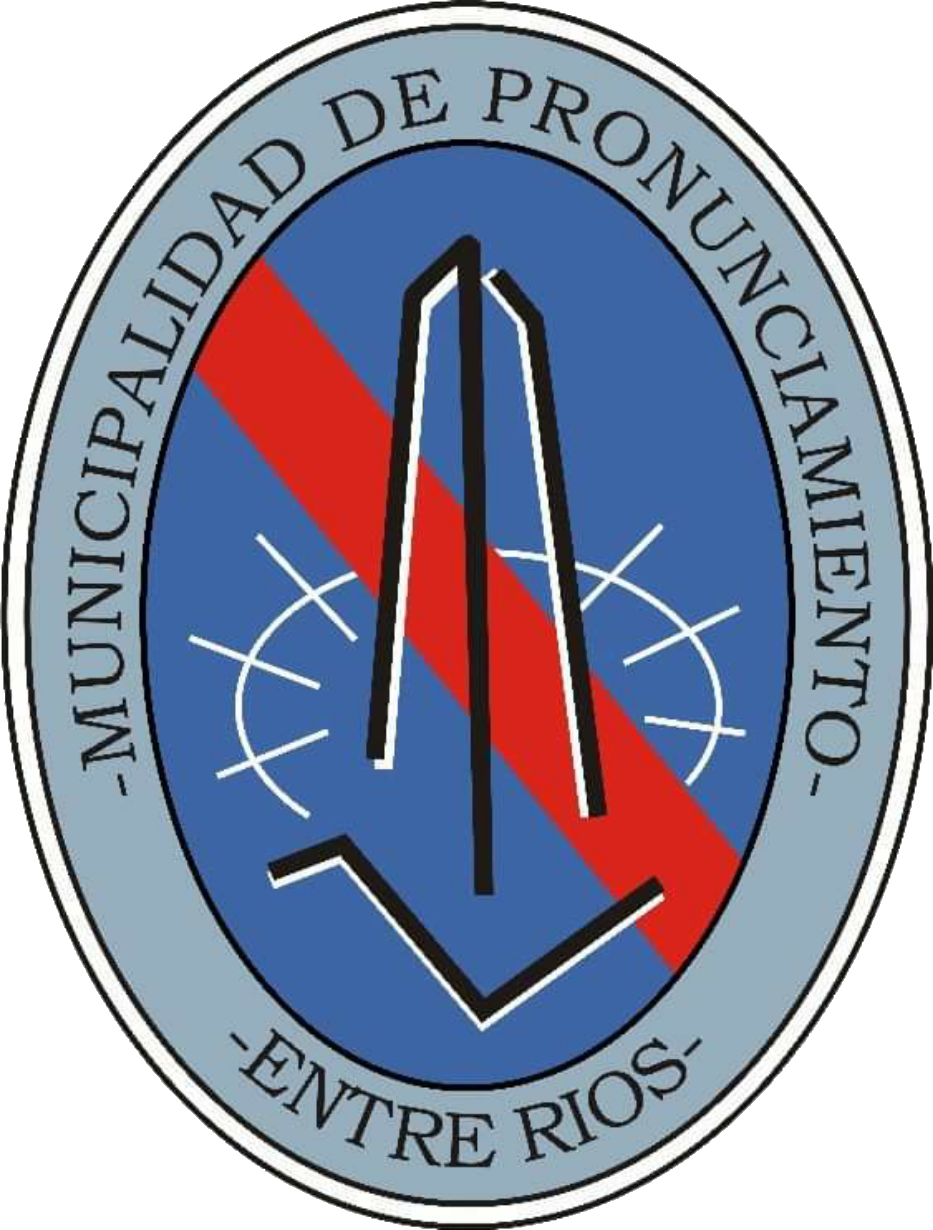
- Coat of arms
- Nickname: Estación Pronunciamiento
- Interactive map of Pronunciamiento
- Country: Argentina
- Province: Entre Ríos
- Time zone: UTC−3 (ART)

Pronunciamiento is a village and municipality in Entre Ríos Province in north-eastern Argentina.
