= Sol de América de Formosa =

Argentine football club

Sol de América
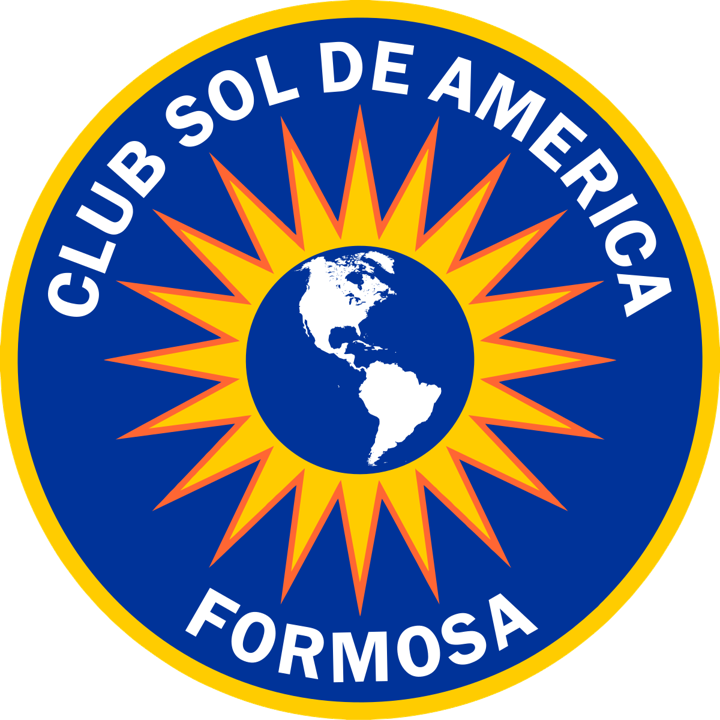
- Full name: Club Sportivo y Social Sol de América
- Nickname(s): El Guerrero
- Founded: January 5, 1947
- Ground: Estadio Antonio Romero, Formosa, Argentina
- Capacity: 33,000
- League: Torneo Federal A
- 2014: Torneo Federal A, Group 4, 6th

Club Sportivo y Social Sol de América is a football club from Formosa, Argentina. They currently play in the regionalised third level of football in Argentina, in zone 3 of the Torneo Federal A.
