= Deportivo Roca =

Argentine sports club

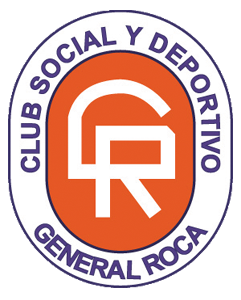
- Full name: Club Social y Deportivo General Roca
- Nickname(s): El Naranja; El Depo
- Founded: 1 September 1974; 51 years ago
- Ground: Estadio Maiolino, General Roca; Río Negro, Argentina
- Manager: Mauro Laspada
- League: Torneo Federal A
- Website: http://www.clubdeportivoroca.com.ar/
Home colours

The Club Social y Deportivo General Roca is an Argentine sports club, based on General Roca, in the Río Negro Province. The club, founded on 1 September 1974, is mostly known for its football and basketball teams.

The football team currently plays in Zone F of the regionalised 3rd division of Argentine football league system, the Torneo Federal A, while the basketball team plays in the third division, Liga Nacional B.

== Football ==
The club has played at the highest level of Argentine football on 2 occasions, when qualified to play in the National tournaments of 1978 and 1982.

In 1978 Deportivo finished 5th of 8 teams in group C, winning 5 drawing 4 and losing 5 of their 14 games. Its most notable results of the season were a 1–0 home win against Diego Maradona's Argentinos Juniors and a 1–0 away win against Rosario Central.

In 1982 El Depo finished in 6th place out of 8 teams, whose most notable results of the season were a 2–0 home win and a 3–1 away win against Racing Club.

== Basketball ==
Deportivo Roca won the 1992–1993 second division Torneo Nacional de Ascenso (TNA). The club remained in first division Liga Nacional de Básquetbol until 1999 when it was relegated back to TNA. At the end of 2002, Deportivo was again relegated, this time to third division Liga Nacional B.

Argentina national basketball team player Juan Ignacio Sánchez had his professional debut with Deportivo.

== Players 2018 ==
Actually january/30/2018 Note: Flags indicate national team as defined under FIFA eligibility rules; some limited exceptions apply. Players may hold more than one non-FIFA nationality.

No.	Pos.	Nation	Player
1	GK	ARG	Maximiliano Paniccia
7	FW	ARG	José Durán
8	FW	ARG	Fabián Ortíz

== See also ==
- List of football clubs in Argentina
- Argentine football league system
