= 2019–20 Club Atlético Mitre season =

Association football season

Mitre
2019–20 season
- President: Guillermo Raed
- Manager: Gabriel Gómez
- Stadium: Estadio Aurinegro
- Copa Argentina: Round of 32

The 2019–20 season is Mitre's 3rd consecutive season in the second division of Argentine football. In addition to Primera B Nacional, the club are competing in the Copa Argentina.

The season generally covers the period from 1 July 2019 to 30 June 2020.

== Review ==
=== Pre-season ===
Three departures were confirmed before any signings were made, as Martín Perafán's departure to Agropecuario on 6 June was followed by Lucas Pérez Godoy and Franco Ferrari leaving on 10/20 June for Deportivo Morón and Volos respectively. Exequiel Beltramone agreed a loan in from Talleres on 24 June. On 25 June, Mitre announced a double signing in Lucas Márquez (Gimnasia y Esgrima (M) and Leandro Lencinas (Godoy Cruz). Agustín Verdugo also made a move from Godoy Cruz twenty-four hours later. Ariel Coronel departed to Atlanta on 27 June. Across the subsequent three days, the arrivals of Diego Auzqui, Rodrigo López, Jorge Scolari and Guillermo Farré were made final; the latter on 30 June, the same time Román Strada penned terms with Santamarina.

All loans from 2018 to 2019 officially ended on/around 30 June. Juan Manuel Marital, Ángel Piz and Lucas Ceballos all joined on 1 July, as Brian Mieres struck a deal with Chacarita Juniors. One in and one out occurred on 2 July, with Norberto Paparatto going to Almagro and Luis Ojeda coming from Ascenso MX's Cafetaleros de Tapachula. Joaquín Quinteros left to Atlético de Rafaela on 3 July. Mitre's twelfth new addition was revealed on 5 July, as forward Iván Escobares came from Juventud Unida Universitario. Guillermo Vernetti went to Defensores de Belgrano (BA). Adrián Toloza arrived from Mexican side Celaya on 6 July. The incomings of David Valdez and Mauro Maidana from San Jorge and Argentinos Juniors were communicated on 9 July.

Mitre drew (1–1) and then beat (4–0) Vélez Sarsfield in friendlies on 10 July. Felipe Cadenazzi signed for Brown on 10 July. A friendly with Argentinos Juniors for 13 July was cancelled. Leonardo Valdez and Marcos Rivadero were officialized as new players on 15 July, as was Marcos Figueroa on 17 July.

=== July ===
Mitre were eliminated from the 2018–19 Copa Argentina on 20 July, as Estudiantes (LP) of the Primera División defeated them after goals from Matías Pellegrini and Federico González. A loan move for Nicolás Temperini, from Newell's Old Boys, was completed on 22 July. 26 July saw Mitre and San Martín (T) meet in friendlies, as they shared wins in San Miguel de Tucumán. Luca Falabella arrived on loan from Argentinos Juniors on 30 July, on the same date that Mitre agreed a deal for Alejandro Rébola; subject to terms.

=== August ===
Rébola officially joined from Mushuc Runa on 1 August, with Rodrigo Sayavedra (Argentino) following a day later. Belgrano were beaten in an exhibition encounter away on 3 August, though Mitre lost the day's other fixture 4–0. Mitre's fourth pre-season match was played on 8 August, as they were defeated consecutively by Primera División team Atlético Tucumán. On 14 August, Argentino announced a loan deal had been agreed with Mitre for Gabriel Tellas; Mitre confirmed it hours later, though it was still to be finalised contractually. The club opened their Primera B Nacional campaign with a loss on 16 August, as Estudiantes (BA) beat them after a goal from Francisco González Metilli. Mitre lost again in game two, falling to defeat in Buenos Aires to Atlanta on 24 August.

=== September ===
Mitre began September as they ended August - with a loss, as San Martín (SJ)'s Marcos Gelabert netted a ninety-fifth-minute winner.

== Squad ==
| Squad No. | Nationality | Name | Position(s) | Date of birth (age) | Signed from |
Goalkeepers
| | Argentina | Juan Boiero | GK | 30 September 1995 (age 31) | Academy |
| | Argentina | Emilio Di Fulvio | GK | 17 May 1995 (age 31) | Rosario Central |
| | Argentina | Luis Ojeda | GK | 21 March 1990 (age 36) | Cafetaleros de Tapachula |
| | Argentina | Nicolás Temperini | GK | 9 February 1995 (age 31) | Newell's Old Boys (loan) |
Defenders
| | Argentina | Nelson Benítez | LB | 24 May 1984 (age 42) | Atlético de Rafaela |
| | Argentina | Lucas Ceballos | DF | 3 January 1987 (age 39) | Patronato |
| | Argentina | Luca Falabella | DF | 10 March 1999 (age 27) | Argentinos Juniors (loan) |
| | Argentina | Rodrigo López | DF | 21 April 1993 (age 33) | Unión Sunchales |
| | Argentina | Mauro Maidana | LB | 12 August 1990 (age 36) | Argentinos Juniors |
| | Argentina | Juan Manuel Marital | LB | 25 May 1993 (age 33) | Huracán Las Heras |
| | Argentina | Lucas Márquez | LB | 25 October 1988 (age 38) | Gimnasia y Esgrima (M) |
| | Argentina | Matías Moisés | SW | 3 June 1987 (age 39) | Boca Unidos |
| | Argentina | Alejandro Rébola | CB | 24 July 1988 (age 38) | Mushuc Runa |
| | Argentina | Jorge Scolari | DF | 19 September 1989 (age 37) | Defensores de Belgrano (VR) |
Midfielders
| | Argentina | Juan Ignacio Alessandroni | DM | 26 December 1988 (age 37) | Unión Mar del Plata |
| | Argentina | Diego Auzqui | CM | 19 October 1989 (age 37) | Gimnasia y Esgrima (M) |
| | Argentina | Nicolás Czornomaz | CM | 8 July 1995 (age 31) | Los Angeles FC |
| | Argentina | Leandro De Muner | CM | 10 April 1983 (age 43) | Unión Aconquija |
| | Argentina | Guillermo Farré | DM | 16 March 1981 (age 45) | Sarmiento (J) |
| | Argentina | Leandro Lencinas | LW | 6 March 1995 (age 31) | Godoy Cruz |
| | Argentina | Leandro Navarro | LM | 16 April 1992 (age 34) | Venados |
| | Argentina | Ángel Piz | CM | 28 February 1992 (age 34) | Sarmiento (R) |
| | Argentina | Marcos Rivadero | CM | 9 October 1992 (age 34) | Belgrano (loan) |
| | Argentina | Nicolás Sánchez | AM | 21 February 1992 (age 34) | Villa Dálmine |
| | Argentina | Rodrigo Sayavedra | MF | 21 July 1995 (age 31) | Argentino |
| | Argentina | José Luis Torres | AM | 17 July 1995 (age 31) | Comercio Central Unidos |
| | Argentina | David Valdez | RM | 6 April 1993 (age 33) | San Jorge |
| | Argentina | Leonardo Valdez | MF | 19 May 1996 (age 30) | San Jorge |
| | Argentina | Agustín Verdugo | CM | 18 September 1997 (age 29) | Godoy Cruz |
Forwards
| | Argentina | Exequiel Beltramone | RW | 9 February 1999 (age 27) | Talleres (loan) |
| | Argentina | Ismael Blanco | CF | 19 January 1983 (age 43) | Atlético Tucumán |
| | Argentina | Iván Escobares | FW | 27 April 1996 (age 30) | Juventud Unida Universitario |
| | Argentina | Marcos Figueroa | CF | 18 January 1990 (age 36) | Cobresal |
| | Argentina | José Ingratti | FW | 28 July 2000 (age 26) | Academy |
| | Argentina | Gabriel Tellas | FW | 10 August 1992 (age 34) | Argentino (loan) |
| | Argentina | Adrián Toloza | FW | 5 June 1990 (age 36) | Celaya |

== Transfers ==
Domestic transfer windows:
3 July 2019 to 24 September 2019
20 January 2020 to 19 February 2020.

=== Transfers in ===
| Date from | Position | Nationality | Name | From | Ref. |
|---|---|---|---|---|---|
| 3 July 2019 (Note: Deal agreed on 25 June 2019) | LB | Argentina | Lucas Márquez | Gimnasia y Esgrima (M) | |
| 3 July 2019 (Note: Deal agreed on 25 June 2019) | LW | Argentina | Leandro Lencinas | Godoy Cruz | |
| 3 July 2019 (Note: Deal agreed on 26 June 2019) | CM | Argentina | Agustín Verdugo | Godoy Cruz | |
| 3 July 2019 (Note: Deal agreed on 28 June 2019) | CM | Argentina | Diego Auzqui | Gimnasia y Esgrima (M) | |
| 3 July 2019 (Note: Deal agreed on 28 June 2019) | DF | Argentina | Rodrigo López | Unión Sunchales | |
| 3 July 2019 (Note: Deal agreed on 29 June 2019) | DF | Argentina | Jorge Scolari | Defensores de Belgrano (VR) | |
| 3 July 2019 (Note: Deal agreed on 30 June 2019) | DM | Argentina | Guillermo Farré | Sarmiento (J) | |
| 3 July 2019 (Note: Deal agreed on 1 July 2019) | LB | Argentina | Juan Manuel Marital | Huracán Las Heras | |
| 3 July 2019 (Note: Deal agreed on 1 July 2019) | CM | Argentina | Ángel Piz | Sarmiento (R) | |
| 3 July 2019 (Note: Deal agreed on 1 July 2019) | DF | Argentina | Lucas Ceballos | Patronato | |
| 3 July 2019 (Note: Deal agreed on 2 July 2019) | GK | Argentina | Luis Ojeda | Cafetaleros de Tapachula | |
| 5 July 2019 | FW | Argentina | Iván Escobares | Juventud Unida Universitario | |
| 6 July 2019 | FW | Argentina | Adrián Toloza | Celaya | |
| 9 July 2019 | RM | Argentina | David Valdez | San Jorge | |
| 9 July 2019 | LB | Argentina | Mauro Maidana | Argentinos Juniors | |
| 15 July 2019 | MF | Argentina | Leonardo Valdez | San Jorge | |
| 17 July 2019 | CF | Argentina | Marcos Figueroa | Cobresal | |
| 1 August 2019 | CB | Argentina | Alejandro Rébola | Mushuc Runa | |
| 2 August 2019 | MF | Argentina | Rodrigo Sayavedra | Argentino | |

=== Transfers out ===
| Date from | Position | Nationality | Name | To | Ref. |
|---|---|---|---|---|---|
| 3 July 2019 (Note: Deal agreed on 6 June 2019) | GK | Argentina | Martín Perafán | Agropecuario | |
| 3 July 2019 (Note: Deal agreed on 10 June 2019) | DM | Argentina | Lucas Pérez Godoy | Deportivo Morón | |
| 3 July 2019 (Note: Deal agreed on 20 June 2019) | LB | Argentina | Franco Ferrari | Volos | |
| 3 July 2019 (Note: Deal agreed on 27 June 2019) | CB | Argentina | Ariel Coronel | Atlanta | |
| 3 July 2019 (Note: Deal agreed on 30 June 2019) | MF | Argentina | Román Strada | Santamarina | |
| 3 July 2019 (Note: Deal agreed on 1 July 2019) | RB | Argentina | Brian Mieres | Chacarita Juniors | |
| 3 July 2019 (Note: Deal agreed on 2 July 2019) | CB | Argentina | Norberto Paparatto | Almagro | |
| 3 July 2019 (Note: Deal agreed on 3 July 2019) | DF | Argentina | Franco Ledesma | Independiente Rivadavia | |
| 3 July 2019 | LW | Argentina | Joaquín Quinteros | Atlético de Rafaela | |
| 5 July 2019 | AM | Argentina | Guillermo Vernetti | Defensores de Belgrano (BA) | |
| 10 July 2019 | CF | Argentina | Felipe Cadenazzi | Brown | |

=== Loans in ===
| Start date | Position | Nationality | Name | From | End date | Ref. |
|---|---|---|---|---|---|---|
| 3 July 2019 (Note: Deal agreed on 24 June 2019) | RW | Argentina | Exequiel Beltramone | Talleres | 30 June 2020 | |
| 15 July 2019 | CM | Argentina | Marcos Rivadero | Belgrano | 30 June 2020 | |
| 22 July 2019 | GK | Argentina | Nicolás Temperini | Newell's Old Boys | 30 June 2020 | |
| 30 July 2019 | DF | Argentina | Luca Falabella | Argentinos Juniors | 30 June 2020 | |
| 31 August 2019 | FW | Argentina | Gabriel Tellas | Argentino | 30 June 2021 | |

== Friendlies ==
=== Pre-season ===
A friendly fixture with Argentinos Juniors was scheduled for 13 July. Vélez Sarsfield, San Martín (T), Belgrano and Atlético Tucumán were all pre-season opponents for Mitre.

Win Draw Loss

| 10 July 2019 Friendly | Mitre | 1–1 | Vélez Sarsfield | Santiago del Estero, Argentina |
| | A. Toloza | Nuevo Diario | Savín | Stadium: Estadio Aurinegro |

| 10 July 2019 Friendly | Mitre | 4–0 | Vélez Sarsfield | Santiago del Estero, Argentina |
| | J. Ingratti; O. Tamer; A. Verdugo | Nuevo Diario | | Stadium: Estadio Aurinegro |

| 13 July 2019 Friendly | Argentinos Juniors | Cancelled | Mitre | Buenos Aires, Argentina |
| | | | | Stadium: Estadio Diego Armando Maradona; Attendance: 0 (Note: Behind closed doors.) |

| 26 July 2019 Friendly | San Martín (T) | 1–0 | Mitre | San Miguel de Tucumán, Argentina |
| 14:30 GMT-3 | S. Matos (pen.) | Mitre; La Gaceta | | Stadium: Estadio La Ciudadela; Attendance: 0 (Note: Behind closed doors.) |

| 26 July 2019 Friendly | San Martín (T) | 0–1 | Mitre | San Miguel de Tucumán, Argentina |
| | | Mitre; La Gaceta | I. Escobares | Stadium: Estadio La Ciudadela; Attendance: 0 (Note: Behind closed doors.) |

| 3 August 2019 Friendly | Belgrano | 0–1 | Mitre | Córdoba, Argentina |
| 09:30 GMT-3 | | Mitre; Cba24n | A. Toloza | Stadium: Predio Armando Pérez |

| 3 August 2019 Friendly | Belgrano | 4–0 | Mitre | Córdoba, Argentina |
| | G. Lencina; J. Barinaga; V. Barbero | Mitre; La Voz del Interior | | Stadium: Predio Armando Pérez |

| 8 August 2019 Friendly | Atlético Tucumán | 1–0 | Mitre | San Miguel de Tucumán, Argentina |
| | G. Castellani | Mitre; Nuevo Diario | | Stadium: Estadio Monumental José Fierro |

| 8 August 2019 Friendly | Atlético Tucumán | 1–0 | Mitre | San Miguel de Tucumán, Argentina |
| | J. Romero | Mitre; Nuevo Diario | | Stadium: Estadio Monumental José Fierro |

== Competitions ==
=== Primera B Nacional ===
==== Results summary ====
| Overall | | | | | | | | Home | | | | | | Away | | | | | |
| Pld | W | D | L | GF | GA | GD | Pts | W | D | L | GF | GA | GD | W | D | L | GF | GA | GD |
|---|---|---|---|---|---|---|---|---|---|---|---|---|---|---|---|---|---|---|---|
| 3 | 0 | 0 | 3 | 0 | 3 | −3 | 0 | 0 | 0 | 2 | 0 | 2 | −2 | 0 | 0 | 1 | 0 | 1 | −1 |

Last updated: 3 September 2019.
Source: Soccerway

==== Matches ====
The fixtures for the 2019–20 league season were announced on 1 August 2019, with a new format of split zones being introduced. Mitre were drawn in Zone A.

Win Draw Loss

| 16 August 2019 1 | Mitre | 0–1 | Estudiantes (BA) | Santiago del Estero, Argentina |
| 22:00 GMT-3 | | Soccerway; Vía País | F. González Metilli 54' | Stadium: Estadio Aurinegro; Referee: Ramiro López (Argentina) |

| 24 August 2019 2 | Atlanta | 1–0 | Mitre | Buenos Aires, Argentina |
| 15:30 GMT-3 | L. López 22' | Aire de Santa Fe; Soccerway | | Stadium: Estadio Don León Kolbovski; Referee: Bruno Bocca (Argentina) |

| 1 September 2019 3 | Mitre | 0–1 | San Martín (SJ) | Santiago del Estero, Argentina |
| 20:30 GMT-3 | | Mitre; Diario de Cuyo; Soccerway | M. Gelabert 90+5' | Stadium: Estadio Aurinegro; Referee: Gerardo Méndez Cedro (Argentina) |

| 8 September 2019 4 | Ferro Carril Oeste | – | Mitre | Buenos Aires, Argentina |
| 16:00 GMT-3 | | | | Stadium: Estadio Arquitecto Ricardo Etcheverry |

=== Copa Argentina ===
Mitre were drawn to face Primera División outfit Estudiantes (LP) in the round of thirty-two in the Copa Argentina, with the fixture taking place at the neutral venue of Cutral Có's Estadio Coloso del Ruca Quimey.

Win Draw Loss

| 20 July 2019 R32 | Mitre | 0–2 | Estudiantes (LP) | Cutral Có, Argentina |
| 13:10 GMT-3 | | Mitre; Infobae; Soccerway | M. Pellegrini; F. González | Stadium: Estadio Coloso del Ruca Quimey; Referee: Jorge Baliño (Argentina) |

== Squad statistics ==
=== Appearances and goals ===
| No. | Pos. | Nationality | Name | League | | Cup | | League Cup | | Continental | | Other | | Total | | Discipline | | Ref |
| No. | Pos. | Nationality | Name | Apps | Goals | Apps | Goals | Apps | Goals | Apps | Goals | Apps | Goals | Apps | Goals | Yellow card | Red card | Ref |
|---|---|---|---|---|---|---|---|---|---|---|---|---|---|---|---|---|---|---|
| – | GK | Argentina | Juan Boiero | 0 | 0 | 0 | 0 | — | | — | | 0 | 0 | 0 | 0 | 0 | 0 | |
| – | GK | Argentina | Emilio Di Fulvio | 0 | 0 | 1 | 0 | — | | — | | 0 | 0 | 1 | 0 | 0 | 0 | |
| – | GK | Argentina | Luis Ojeda | 3 | 0 | 0 | 0 | — | | — | | 0 | 0 | 3 | 0 | 0 | 0 | |
| – | GK | Argentina | Nicolás Temperini | 0 | 0 | 0 | 0 | — | | — | | 0 | 0 | 0 | 0 | 0 | 0 | |
| – | LB | Argentina | Nelson Benítez | 0 | 0 | 0 | 0 | — | | — | | 0 | 0 | 0 | 0 | 0 | 0 | |
| – | DF | Argentina | Lucas Ceballos | 3 | 0 | 1 | 0 | — | | — | | 0 | 0 | 4 | 0 | 0 | 0 | |
| – | DF | Argentina | Luca Falabella | 0 | 0 | 0 | 0 | — | | — | | 0 | 0 | 0 | 0 | 0 | 0 | |
| – | DF | Argentina | Rodrigo López | 0 | 0 | 0 | 0 | — | | — | | 0 | 0 | 0 | 0 | 0 | 0 | |
| – | LB | Argentina | Mauro Maidana | 3 | 0 | 1 | 0 | — | | — | | 0 | 0 | 4 | 0 | 0 | 0 | |
| – | LB | Argentina | Juan Manuel Marital | 0 | 0 | 0 | 0 | — | | — | | 0 | 0 | 0 | 0 | 0 | 0 | |
| – | LB | Argentina | Lucas Márquez | 0 | 0 | 0 | 0 | — | | — | | 0 | 0 | 0 | 0 | 0 | 0 | |
| – | SW | Argentina | Matías Moisés | 3 | 0 | 1 | 0 | — | | — | | 0 | 0 | 4 | 0 | 0 | 0 | |
| – | CB | Argentina | Alejandro Rébola | 3 | 0 | 0 | 0 | — | | — | | 0 | 0 | 3 | 0 | 1 | 0 | |
| – | DF | Argentina | Jorge Scolari | 0 | 0 | 1 | 0 | — | | — | | 0 | 0 | 1 | 0 | 0 | 0 | |
| – | DM | Argentina | Juan Ignacio Alessandroni | 2 | 0 | 1 | 0 | — | | — | | 0 | 0 | 3 | 0 | 1 | 0 | |
| – | CM | Argentina | Diego Auzqui | 2 | 0 | 1 | 0 | — | | — | | 0 | 0 | 3 | 0 | 0 | 0 | |
| – | CM | Argentina | Nicolás Czornomaz | 0 | 0 | 0 | 0 | — | | — | | 0 | 0 | 0 | 0 | 0 | 0 | |
| – | DM | Argentina | Leandro De Muner | 0 | 0 | 0 | 0 | — | | — | | 0 | 0 | 0 | 0 | 0 | 0 | |
| – | DM | Argentina | Guillermo Farré | 1 | 0 | 1 | 0 | — | | — | | 0 | 0 | 2 | 0 | 0 | 0 | |
| – | LW | Argentina | Leandro Lencinas | 0 | 0 | 1 | 0 | — | | — | | 0 | 0 | 1 | 0 | 0 | 0 | |
| – | LM | Argentina | Leandro Navarro | 0 | 0 | 0 | 0 | — | | — | | 0 | 0 | 0 | 0 | 0 | 0 | |
| – | CM | Argentina | Ángel Piz | 0 | 0 | 0(1) | 0 | — | | — | | 0 | 0 | 0(1) | 0 | 0 | 0 | |
| – | MF | Argentina | Marcos Rivadero | 3 | 0 | 0 | 0 | — | | — | | 0 | 0 | 3 | 0 | 2 | 0 | |
| – | AM | Argentina | Nicolás Sánchez | 0 | 0 | 0 | 0 | — | | — | | 0 | 0 | 0 | 0 | 0 | 0 | |
| – | MF | Argentina | Rodrigo Sayavedra | 1(2) | 0 | 0 | 0 | — | | — | | 0 | 0 | 1(2) | 0 | 0 | 0 | |
| – | AM | Argentina | José Luis Torres | 2(1) | 0 | 0 | 0 | — | | — | | 0 | 0 | 2(1) | 0 | 0 | 0 | |
| – | RM | Argentina | David Valdez | 0 | 0 | 0(1) | 0 | — | | — | | 0 | 0 | 0(1) | 0 | 0 | 0 | |
| – | MF | Argentina | Leonardo Valdez | 0 | 0 | 0 | 0 | — | | — | | 0 | 0 | 0 | 0 | 0 | 0 | |
| – | CM | Argentina | Agustín Verdugo | 2(1) | 0 | 1 | 0 | — | | — | | 0 | 0 | 3(1) | 0 | 0 | 0 | |
| – | RW | Argentina | Exequiel Beltramone | 0 | 0 | 0 | 0 | — | | — | | 0 | 0 | 0 | 0 | 0 | 0 | |
| – | CF | Argentina | Ismael Blanco | 0(2) | 0 | 0 | 0 | — | | — | | 0 | 0 | 0(2) | 0 | 0 | 0 | |
| – | FW | Argentina | Iván Escobares | 0 | 0 | 0 | 0 | — | | — | | 0 | 0 | 0 | 0 | 0 | 0 | |
| – | CF | Argentina | Marcos Figueroa | 0(2) | 0 | 0 | 0 | — | | — | | 0 | 0 | 0(2) | 0 | 1 | 0 | |
| – | CF | Argentina | José Ingratti | 0(1) | 0 | 1 | 0 | — | | — | | 0 | 0 | 1(1) | 0 | 0 | 0 | |
| – | FW | Argentina | Gabriel Tellas | 1 | 0 | 0 | 0 | — | | — | | 0 | 0 | 1 | 0 | 0 | 0 | |
| – | FW | Argentina | Adrián Toloza | 3 | 0 | 0 | 0 | — | | — | | 0 | 0 | 3 | 0 | 0 | 0 | |
| Own goals | | | | — | 0 | — | 0 | — | | — | | — | 0 | — | 0 | — | — | — |

Statistics accurate as of 3 September 2019.
