= Nicolás Sánchez =

Nicolás Sánchez may refer to:

- Nicolás Sánchez (footballer, born 1986), Argentine defender
- Nicolás Sánchez (footballer, born 1992), Argentine midfielder
- Nicolás Sánchez (footballer, born 1997), Argentine midfielder
- Nicolás Sánchez (rugby union), Argentine fly-half
