= Marcos Figueroa =

Argentine footballer (born 1990)

Personal information
- Full name: Marcos Daniel Figueroa
- Date of birth: 18 January 1990 (age 36)
- Place of birth: Rosario, Argentina
- Height: 1.72 m (5 ft 7 1/2 in)
- Position: Centre-forward

Team information
- Current team: Temperley

Senior career*
Years	Team	Apps	(Gls)
2010–2012	Rosario Central	1	(0)
2011–2012	→ Central Córdoba (loan)	40	(8)
2012–2013	Argentinos Juniors	26	(4)
2013–2014	Atlético de Rafaela	19	(0)
2014–2015	San Martín (SJ)	48	(12)
2016–2018	Temperley	56	(10)
2018	San Martín (T)	8	(0)
2019	Cobresal	9	(0)
2019	Mitre	5	(0)
2020	Sportivo Desamparados	0	(0)
2020–	Temperley	0	(0)
- * Club domestic league appearances and goals as of 15:04, 7 October 2020 (UTC)

Marcos Daniel Figueroa (born 18 January 1990) is an Argentine professional footballer who plays as a centre-forward for Temperley.

== Career ==
Rosario Central became Figueroa's first senior club in 2010, he made his professional debut for them in the Argentine Primera División on 15 May against Vélez Sarsfield. In 2011, Figueroa was loaned to Central Córdoba in Primera C Metropolitana. He scored nine times in forty-four fixtures for Central Córdoba. After returning to Rosario Central, Figueroa made the move to fellow Primera División team Argentinos Juniors on 9 July 2012. He scored a hat-trick on his eighth appearance during a 3–3 tie with Unión Santa Fe. July 2013 saw Figueroa join Atlético de Rafaela, where he'd make nineteen appearances.

In June 2014, San Martín (SJ) of Primera B Nacional signed Figueroa. He netted five goals in twenty matches throughout 2014, a season which ended with promotion to the top-flight. He scored seven times in the following campaign, which preceded a move to Temperley in January 2016. During his opening two campaigns with Temperley, Figueroa got ten goals in forty-two fixtures. Temperley suffered relegation to Primera B Nacional in 2017–18, Figueroa subsequently terminated his contract with the club. His last appearance for Temperley, on 12 March 2018 versus Unión Santa Fe, was his 200th career appearance.

Figueroa completed a transfer to San Martín (T) on 30 June; a newly promoted Primera División team. Six months later, on 28 December, Figueroa moved to Chilean football with Cobresal. He featured in a total of nine games in the Chilean Primera División, before going back to his homeland in the succeeding July with Mitre. He left the club at the end of the year, having made five appearances. In March 2020, Figueroa signed for Torneo Federal A team Sportivo Desamparados. However, due to the COVID-19 pandemic, he never appeared. In September 2020, Figueroa rejoined Temperley in Primera B Nacional.

== Career statistics ==
As of 7 October 2020.

Club statistics
Club	Season	League			Cup		League Cup		Continental		Other		Total	
Club	Season	Division	Apps	Goals	Apps	Goals	Apps	Goals	Apps	Goals	Apps	Goals	Apps	Goals
Rosario Central	2009–10	Argentine Primera División	1	0	0	0	—		—		0	0	1	0
Rosario Central	2010–11	Primera B Nacional	0	0	0	0	—		—		0	0	0	0
Rosario Central	2011–12	Primera B Nacional	0	0	0	0	—		—		0	0	0	0
Rosario Central	Total		1	0	0	0	—		—		0	0	1	0
Central Córdoba (loan)	2011–12	Primera C Metropolitana	40	8	2	0	—		—		2 (Note: Appearance(s) in the Primera C Metropolitana play-offs)	1	44	9
Argentinos Juniors	2012–13	Argentine Primera División	26	4	0	0	—		1 (Note: Appearance(s) in the Copa Sudamericana)	0	0	0	27	4
Atlético de Rafaela	2013–14	Argentine Primera División	19	0	0	0	—		—		0	0	19	0
San Martín (SJ)	2014	Primera B Nacional	19	5	1	0	—		—		0	0	20	5
San Martín (SJ)	2015	Argentine Primera División	29	7	2	0	—		—		1 (Note: Appearance(s) in the Argentine Primera División play-offs)	0	32	7
San Martín (SJ)	Total		48	12	3	0	—		—		1	0	52	12
Temperley	2016	Argentine Primera División	14	3	0	0	—		—		0	0	14	3
Temperley	2016–17	Argentine Primera División	28	7	0	0	—		—		0	0	28	7
Temperley	2017–18	Argentine Primera División	14	0	1	0	—		—		0	0	15	0
Temperley	Total		56	10	1	0	—		—		0	0	57	10
San Martín (T)	2018–19	Argentine Primera División	8	0	2	0	—		—		0	0	10	0
Cobresal	2019	Chilean Primera División	9	0	1	0	—		—		0	0	10	0
Mitre	2019–20	Primera B Nacional	5	0	0	0	—		—		0	0	5	0
Sportivo Desamparados	2019–20	Torneo Federal A	0	0	0	0	—		—		0	0	0	0
Temperley	2020–21	Primera B Nacional	0	0	0	0	—		—		0	0	0	0
Career total			212	34	9	0	—		1	0	3	1	225	35
