= 2008–09 FC Porto season =

FC Porto
2008–09 season
- Chairman: Jorge Nuno Pinto da Costa
- Manager: Jesualdo Ferreira
- Stadium: Estádio do Dragão
- Primeira Liga: 1st
- Supertaça Cândido de Oliveira: Runners-up
- Taça de Portugal: Winners
- Taça da Liga: Semi-finals
- Champions League: Quarter-finals
- Top goalscorer: Ernesto Farías (10)
Home colours	Away colours

During the 2008–09 Portuguese football season, FC Porto competed in the Primeira Liga.

== First-team squad ==
Squad at end of season

Note: Flags indicate national team as defined under FIFA eligibility rules; some limited exceptions apply. Players may hold more than one non-FIFA nationality.

No.	Pos.	Nation	Player
1	GK	BRA	Helton
2	DF	POR	Bruno Alves
3	DF	POR	Pedro Emanuel (Note: Emanuel was born in Luanda, Angola, but also qualified to represent Portugal internationally and represented them at U-21 level.)
4	DF	SRB	Milan Stepanov
5	DF	ARG	Nelson Benítez
6	MF	COL	Fredy Guarín
8	MF	ARG	Lucho González
9	FW	ARG	Lisandro López
10	MF	URU	Cristian Rodríguez
11	MF	ARG	Mariano González (on loan from Palermo)
12	FW	BRA	Hulk
13	DF	URU	Jorge Fucile
14	DF	POR	Rolando (Note: Rolando was born in São Vicente, Cape Verde, but was raised in Portugal from the age of 14 and represented them at U-21 level before making his international debut for Portugal in 2009.)
16	MF	POR	Raul Meireles
17	MF	MAR	Tarik Sektioui

No.	Pos.	Nation	Player
19	FW	ARG	Ernesto Farías
20	MF	ARG	Tomás Costa
21	DF	ROU	Cristian Săpunaru
22	MF	ARG	Andrés Madrid (on loan from Braga)
24	GK	POR	Hugo Ventura
25	MF	BRA	Fernando
28	DF	FRA	Aly Cissokho
29	FW	POR	Rabiola
33	GK	POR	Nuno Espírito Santo (Note: Nuno was born in São Tomé, São Tomé and Príncipe, but also qualified to represent Portugal internationally and represented them at U-21 level.)
34	DF	POR	Ivo Pinto
35	DF	BRA	Rafhael (on loan from Figueirense)
37	MF	POR	Josué
39	MF	POR	Ricardo Dias
50	MF	POR	Diogo Viana
52	MF	POR	Sérgio Oliveira

=== Left club during season ===
Note: Flags indicate national team as defined under FIFA eligibility rules; some limited exceptions apply. Players may hold more than one non-FIFA nationality.

No.	Pos.	Nation	Player
7	MF	POR	Ricardo Quaresma (to Inter Milan)
15	DF	BRA	Lino (to PAOK)
18	MF	ARG	Mario Bolatti (on loan to Huracán)

No.	Pos.	Nation	Player
23	MF	POR	Daniel Candeias (on loan to Rio Ave)
26	DF	POR	Bernardo Tengarrinha (on loan to Estrela da Amadora)
30	MF	POR	Pelé (on loan to Portsmouth)
