= David Valdez =

David Valdez may refer to:

- David Valdez (footballer) (born 1993), Argentine footballer
- David Valdez (photographer) (born 1949), American photographer
