= Di Fulvio =

Di Fulvio is a surname. Notable people with the surname includes:

- Emilio Di Fulvio (born 1995), Argentine professional footballer
- Francesco Di Fulvio (born 1993), Italian polo player
- Luca Di Fulvio (1957–2023), Italian novelist
