= 2008 Supertaça Cândido de Oliveira =

- Event: Supertaça Cândido de Oliveira (Portuguese Super Cup)
Porto	Sporting CP
0	2
- Date: 16 August 2008
- Venue: Estádio Algarve, Faro
- Man of the Match: Yannick Djaló (Sporting CP)
- Referee: Carlos Xistra (Castelo Branco)
- Attendance: 23,609

The 2008 Supertaça Cândido de Oliveira was the 30th edition of the Supertaça Cândido de Oliveira, the annual Portuguese football season-opening match contested by the winners of the previous season's top league and cup competitions (or cup runner-up in case the league- and cup-winning club is the same). 2008 Supertaça Cândido de Oliveira was contested by Porto and Sporting CP. Porto participated in their 24th Supertaça final, their third consecutive final since 2006. Porto went into the match as the Supertaça Cândido de Oliveira 14-time winners. Sporting CP participated in their eighth Supertaça final, also their second consecutive final. Sporting CP went into the match as the Supertaça Cândido de Oliveira six-time winners.

The final took place at Estádio Algarve in Faro on 16 August 2008. The match was televised on TVI. Porto entered the match as the 2007–08 Primeira Liga winners while Sporting entered the match as the winners of the 2007–08 Taça de Portugal after defeating Porto at the Estádio Nacional in May 2008.

After an even first half, Yannick Djaló broke the dead lock just before the half was over. Following the brake, Sporting would go on to score again from Djaló after Cristian Săpunaru's mistake. Porto would later go on to be awarded a penalty following a poor challenge by Marco Caneira. Rui Patrício would save Lucho González's penalty and Sporting held on to capture the Supertaça Cândido de Oliveira. Sporting collected a second consecutive Super Cup, raising the club's tally to seven trophies in this competition.

== Pre-match ==
The Supertaça was played at the Estádio Algarve in Faro. This was the second time that the Supertaça was played in this stadium the other time being in 2005. This was third time that the Estádio Algarve hosted a major final, four months prior to the Supertaça it hosted the 2008 Taça da Liga Final between Sporting and Vitória de Setúbal. Ten thousand tickets were allocated for each team which went on sale on the 2 August.

=== Entry ===
Porto qualified for their third consecutive Supertaça Cândido de Oliveira by clinching the Primeira Liga title with five games to spare. Porto's strong start to the season with important victories over rivals Benfica and Sporting CP provided distance from their main title rivals. However, a drop in form in early 2008 which resulted in two loses in three games meant that Porto's main title challengers were able to capitalize on Porto's mistakes. Porto's resurgence after a dip in form saw them pick up decisive away wins at crucial stages of the season against Belenenses and Leixões which helped deliver the trophy back to Porto for a third consecutive season. In Gameweek 25, Porto defeated Estrela da Amadora, 6–0 at the Estádio do Dragão to clinch the Primeira Liga for the 23rd time.

Sporting CP qualified by winning the 2008 Taça de Portugal Final, beating Porto 2–0 in the final. Sporting beat Louletano 4–0, Lagoa 4–0, Marítimo 2–1, Estrela da Amadora 1–0 and Benfica 5–3. Sporting's 5–3 semi-final victory over Benfica saw the club come back from 2–0 down with goals from Liédson, Derlei, Simon Vukčević and two from Yannick Djaló. The 2008 victory was Sporting's fifteen Taça de Portugal triumph and consequently gained a berth in the 2008 Supertaça Cândido de Oliveira.

=== Officials ===
The match officials for the game were confirmed on 12 August 2008. Carlos Xistra of Castelo Branco was named as referee. Xistra had previously officiated the 2004 Supertaça Cândido de Oliveira between Benfica and Porto at the Estádio Cidade de Coimbra. Xistra was assisted by José Braga of Portalegre and Mário Dionísio of Setúbal, while the fourth official was André Gralha of Santarém.

== Background ==
Porto were appearing in their 24th Supertaça Cândido de Oliveira in which it was their third consecutive Supertaça appearance since 2006. Porto went into the match as 15-time winners (1981, 1983, 1984, 1986, 1990, 1991, 1993, 1994, 1996, 1998, 1999, 2001, 2003, 2004, 2006). Of their 23 appearances, they had lost 8 times (1979, 1985, 1988, 1992, 1995, 1997, 2000, 2007). Sporting were appearing in their eighth final. Sporting went into the match as six-time winners (1982, 1987, 1995, 2000, 2002, 2007). Of the seven Supertaças they had played in, they had only lost one occasion, in 1980 against Benfica.

In Porto's and Sporting's history, the two sides had met prior to their meeting in the Supertaça on seven different occasions. Of those seven, Sporting won three games whilst the four games ended in draws. Porto went into the game without a single win against Sporting in this competition. The last meeting between these two sides in this competition was the 2007 Supertaça competition where Sporting defeated Porto, 1–0 thanks to a goal from Marat Izmailov. The last meeting between these sides prior to this match was the 2008 Taça de Portugal Final, where Sporting defeated Porto, 2–0. Rodrigo Tiuí scored two goals in extra time to clinch Sporting the Taça de Portugal.

== Match ==
=== Team selection ===
Both clubs went into the 2008 Supertaça Cândido de Oliveira with players missing. Sporting were missing several key players like Liédson, Pedro Silva and Simon Vukčević, while Porto were without influential talisman Ricardo Quaresma. Liédson was ineligible for the Supertaça following an injury sustained in a pre-season game. Pedro Silva was suspended after being red-carded in Sporting's last pre-season game of the summer against Dutch side PSV. Sporting were also without Montenegrin midfielder Vukčević due to injury. Vukčević sustained an injury at the beginning of August which kept him out of action for one month. He suffered an acute muscle injury to his left thigh.

Jesualdo Ferreira's squad selection for the match saw the presence of nine newly acquired players of which they included Cristian Rodríguez, Cristian Săpunaru, Daniel Candeias, Fernando, Fredy Guarín, Hulk, Nelson Benítez, Rolando and Tomás Costa. Of those nine, Rodríguez, Săpunaru, Guarín and Benítez started the game. Candeias and Hulk were later used in the match as substitutes. Paulo Bento's squad selection saw him include four new signings in Daniel Carriço, Fábio Rochemback, Hélder Postiga and Marco Caneira. Of those four, Rochemback and Caneira would start the game, although Postiga was later used in the match as a substitute.

=== Summary ===
Sporting started strong with more possession of the ball but failed to create clear cut chances. As the game progressed in the first half, Porto started to grow more into the game and created several chances which tested Sporting's Rui Patrício. Porto's most clear cut chance in the first half fell to Porto captain Lucho González who struck the post on 32 minutes. As the half came to a close, clever link up play between Leandro Romagnoli and Abel dismantled Porto's wing and Abel threaded a ball threw to an unmarked Yannick Djaló who on the edge of the box fired the ball past Helton. Following the break, Porto started stronger and began to create more in attack after Ernesto Farías gave away to Hulk. Despite Porto's superiority, Djaló would score yet again after a series of defense mistakes. Despite Sporting's second goal, Porto pressed to find a consolation. Porto's hunt for their first goal, saw them awarded a penalty by Carlos Xistra following a clumsy challenge by Marco Caneira. González stepped up and saw his penalty saved by Patrício. Sporting would hold on to capture a seventh Supertaça.

=== Details ===
16 August 2008
20:45 UTC

Porto	0–2	Sporting CP
		Djaló 45', 57'

Estádio Algarve, Faro
Attendance: 23,609
Referee: Carlos Xistra

Porto	Sporting

GK	1	(Brazil) Helton
RB	21	(Romania) Cristian Săpunaru
CB	2	(Portugal) Bruno Alves
CB	3	(Portugal) Pedro Emanuel
LB	5	(Argentina) Nelson Benítez	(yellow card) 28'
DM	6	(Colombia) Fredy Guarín		(substituted off) 69'
CM	8	(Argentina) Lucho González (c)	(yellow card) 90'
CM	16	(Portugal) Raul Meireles
RW	9	(Argentina) Lisandro López
LW	10	(Uruguay) Cristian Rodríguez	(yellow card) 90+4'
CF	19	(Argentina) Ernesto Farías		(substituted off) 56'
Substitutes:
GK	33	(Portugal) Nuno
DF	13	(Uruguay) Jorge Fucile
DF	14	(Portugal) Rolando
DF	15	(Brazil) Lino
MF	20	(Argentina) Tomás Costa
MF	25	(Brazil) Fernando
FW	12	(Brazil) Hulk		(substituted on) 56'
FW	23	(Portugal) Daniel Candeias		(substituted on) 69'
Manager:
(Portugal) Jesualdo Ferreira

GK	1	(Portugal) Rui Patrício
RB	78	(Portugal) Abel
CB	13	(Portugal) Tonel
CB	4	(Brazil) Ânderson Polga	(yellow card) 9'
LB	12	(Portugal) Marco Caneira	(yellow card) 71'
DM	28	(Portugal) João Moutinho (c)
CM	26	(Brazil) Fábio Rochemback
CM	7	(Russia) Marat Izmailov		(substituted off) 67'
AM	30	(Argentina) Leandro Romagnoli		(substituted off) 81'
CF	20	(Portugal) Yannick Djaló		(substituted off) 89'
CF	11	(Brazil) Derlei
Substitutes:
GK	16	(Portugal) Tiago
DF	3	(Portugal) Daniel Carriço
DF	18	(Argentina) Leandro Grimi
MF	6	(Portugal) Adrien Silva
MF	8	(Brazil) Ronny
MF	24	(Portugal) Miguel Veloso		(substituted on) 67'
MF	25	(Portugal) Bruno Pereirinha		(substituted on) 89'
FW	22	(Brazil) Rodrigo Tiuí
FW	23	(Portugal) Hélder Postiga		(substituted on) 81'
Manager:
(Portugal) Paulo Bento

2008 Supertaça Cândido de Oliveira Winners
Sporting CP
7th Title

Man of the match

- (Portugal) Yannick Djaló (Sporting CP)

Match officials

- Assistant referees:
  - José Braga (Portalegre)
  - Mário Dionísio (Setúbal)
- Fourth official: André Gralha (Santarém)

Match rules

- 90 minutes
- 30 minutes of extra-time if necessary.
- Penalty shoot-out if scores still level.
- Maximum of three substitutions

== See also ==
- FC Porto–Sporting CP rivalry
- 2008–09 Primeira Liga
- 2008–09 Taça de Portugal
- 2008–09 Taça da Liga
- 2008–09 FC Porto season
