= Nicolás Temperini =

Argentine footballer

Personal information
- Full name: Nicolás Matías Temperini
- Date of birth: 9 February 1995 (age 31)
- Place of birth: Villa Eloísa, Argentina
- Height: 1.86 m (6 ft 1 in)
- Position: Goalkeeper

Team information
- Current team: Deportes Copiapó

Youth career
- Newell's Old Boys

Senior career*
Years	Team	Apps	(Gls)
2015–2020	Newell's Old Boys	1	(0)
2016–2017	→ Talleres (loan)	0	(0)
2019–2020	→ Mitre (loan)	0	(0)
2021	Sant Julià	7	(0)
2022	Santamarina	31	(0)
2023	Deportivo Madryn	34	(0)
2024–2025	San Marcos	50	(0)
2026–	Deportes Copiapó	0	(0)
- * Club domestic league appearances and goals as of 25 December 2025

Nicolás Matías Temperini (born 9 February 1995) is an Argentine professional footballer who plays as a goalkeeper for Chilean club Deportes Copiapó.

== Career ==
Temperini began his career with Newell's Old Boys. He was an unused substitute on two occasions during the 2015 Argentine Primera División season for matches with Rosario Central and San Martín. In August 2016, Temperini joined fellow Primera División team Talleres on loan. He returned to his parent club a year later without playing for Talleres' first-team, only featuring for their youth sides. Temperini's professional debut arrived on 29 October 2018, with the goalkeeper featuring for the full duration of a 2–0 win at home to Argentinos Juniors; having previously been an unused substitute in ten further fixtures.

In 2024, Temperini moved to Chile and joined San Marcos de Arica. He switched to Deportes Copiapó for the 2026 season.

== Career statistics ==
As of 18 November 2018.

Club statistics
Club	Season	League			Cup (Note: Includes the Copa Argentina)		League Cup		Continental (Note: Includes the Copa Sudamericana)		Other		Total	
Club	Season	Division	Apps	Goals	Apps	Goals	Apps	Goals	Apps	Goals	Apps	Goals	Apps	Goals
Newell's Old Boys	2015	Primera División	0	0	0	0	—		—		0	0	0	0
Newell's Old Boys	2016	Primera División	0	0	0	0	—		—		0	0	0	0
Newell's Old Boys	2016–17	Primera División	0	0	0	0	—		—		0	0	0	0
Newell's Old Boys	2017–18	Primera División	0	0	0	0	—		0	0	0	0	0	0
Newell's Old Boys	2018–19	Primera División	1	0	0	0	—		—		0	0	1	0
Newell's Old Boys	Total		1	0	0	0	—		0	0	0	0	1	0
Talleres (loan)	2016–17	Primera División	0	0	0	0	—		—		0	0	0	0
Career total			1	0	0	0	—		0	0	0	0	1	0
