= Leandro Navarro =

Argentine footballer

Personal information
- Full name: Leandro Alexis Navarro
- Date of birth: 16 April 1992 (age 34)
- Place of birth: Mar del Plata, Argentina
- Height: 1.84 m (6 ft 1/2 in)
- Position: Midfielder

Team information
- Current team: Santiago Wanderers

Youth career
- Racing
- Aldosivi
- San Lorenzo

Senior career*
| Years | Team | Apps | (Gls) |
| 2011–2017 | San Lorenzo | 29 | (3) |
| 2015–2016 | → Argentinos Juniors (loan) | 9 | (1) |
| 2016–2017 | → Venados (loan) | 27 | (5) |
| 2018–2019 | Venados | 25 | (4) |
| 2019 | Mitre | 7 | (2) |
| 2020–2021 | Alvarado | 36 | (2) |
| 2022 | Danubio | 29 | (1) |
| 2023 | Deportes Iquique | 31 | (2) |
| 2024 | Cobresal | 13 | (1) |
| 2025– | Santiago Wanderers | 0 | (0) |
- * Club domestic league appearances and goals as of 12 December 2024

Leandro Alexis Navarro (born 16 April 1992) is an Argentine professional footballer who plays as midfielder for Chilean club Santiago Wanderers.

== Career ==
In 2024, Navarro joined Cobresal from Deportes Iquique. He switched to Santiago Wanderers for the 2025 season.

== Honours ==
San Lorenzo

- Argentine Primera División: 2013 Inicial
- Copa Libertadores: 2014
