= Marcos Rivadero =

Argentine footballer

Personal information
- Full name: Marcos Rivadero
- Date of birth: 9 October 1992 (age 34)
- Place of birth: Córdoba, Argentina
- Height: 1.77 m (5 ft 9 1/2 in)
- Position: Midfielder

Team information
- Current team: Defensores de Belgrano

Youth career
- Villa Azalais
- 2003–2013: Belgrano

Senior career*
Years	Team	Apps	(Gls)
2013–2019	Belgrano	6	(0)
2015	→ Guillermo Brown (loan)	22	(0)
2016	→ Universidad San Martín (loan)	17	(1)
2016–2017	→ Guillermo Brown (loan)	41	(2)
2018	→ Villa Dálmine (loan)	9	(2)
2018	→ Gimnasia y Esgrima (loan)	3	(0)
2019–2020	Mitre	19	(0)
2021–	Defensores de Belgrano	25	(0)
- * Club domestic league appearances and goals as of 16:26, 14 July 2022 (UTC)

Marcos Rivadero (born 9 October 1992) is an Argentine professional footballer who plays as a midfielder for Defensores de Belgrano.

== Career ==
Rivadero played part of his youth with Villa Azalais, prior to joining Belgrano in 2003. Ten years later, Rivadero was an unused substitute for a 2012–13 Primera División match against Unión Santa Fe. In May 2014, he made his professional debut in a 0–0 draw at home to Arsenal de Sarandí in 2013–14. In 2014, Rivadero made five further appearances for Belgrano. On 4 February 2015, Rivadero joined Guillermo Brown on loan. He subsequently made twenty-two league appearances. He also scored his first career goal, in the final match of 2015 in the relegation play-off against Gimnasia y Esgrima.

In 2016, Rivadero joined Universidad San Martín of the Peruvian Primera División on loan. He went onto score one goal in seventeen matches, with his only goal coming in his penultimate appearance versus Alianza Atlético on 27 May. He then rejoined Guillermo Brown for a second loan spell. Forty-one matches and two goals followed for Rivadero as the club finished third in Primera B Nacional, missing promotion by two points. He returned to Belgrano in August 2017. In January 2018, Rivadero joined Villa Dálmine of Primera B Nacional on loan. He scored three goals in ten appearances.

Primera B Nacional side Gimnasia y Esgrima loaned Rivadero on 16 July 2018. Despite joining for twelve months, his loan was terminated in December after featuring just three times.

== Career statistics ==
As of 3 January 2019.

Club statistics
Club	Season	League			Cup (Note: Includes the Copa Argentina)		League Cup		Continental (Note: Includes the Copa Sudamericana)		Other (Note: Includes the Primera B Nacional play-offs)		Total	
Club	Season	Division	Apps	Goals	Apps	Goals	Apps	Goals	Apps	Goals	Apps	Goals	Apps	Goals
Belgrano	2012–13	Primera División	0	0	0	0	—		—		0	0	0	0
Belgrano	2013–14	Primera División	1	0	0	0	—		0	0	0	0	1	0
Belgrano	2014	Primera División	5	0	0	0	—		—		0	0	5	0
Belgrano	2015	Primera División	0	0	0	0	—		0	0	0	0	0	0
Belgrano	2016	Primera División	0	0	0	0	—		—		0	0	0	0
Belgrano	2016–17	Primera División	0	0	0	0	—		0	0	0	0	0	0
Belgrano	2017–18	Primera División	0	0	0	0	—		—		0	0	0	0
Belgrano	Total		6	0	0	0	—		0	0	0	0	6	0
Guillermo Brown (loan)	2015	Primera B Nacional	22	0	0	0	—		—		1 (Note: One appearance in 2015 Primera B Nacional play-offs)	1 (Note: One goal in 2015 Primera B Nacional relegation play-off)	23	1
Universidad San Martín (loan)	2016	Torneo Descentralizado	17	1	—		—		—		0	0	17	1
Guillermo Brown (loan)	2016–17	Primera B Nacional	41	2	0	0	—		—		0	0	41	2
Villa Dálmine (loan)	2017–18	Primera B Nacional	9	2	0	0	—		—		1 (Note: One appearance in 2017–18 Primera B Nacional play-offs)	1 (Note: One goal in 2017–18 Primera B Nacional play-offs)	10	3
Gimnasia y Esgrima (loan)	2018–19	Primera B Nacional	3	0	0	0	—		—		0	0	3	0
Career total			98	5	0	0	—		0	0	2	2	100	7
