= Juan Marital =

Argentine footballer (born 1993)

Personal information
- Full name: Juan Manuel Marital Carmona
- Date of birth: 25 February 1993 (age 33)
- Place of birth: Mendoza, Argentina
- Height: 1.73 m (5 ft 8 in)
- Position: Left-back

Team information
- Current team: Juventud Unida Universitario

Senior career*
Years	Team	Apps	(Gls)
2010–2014	Godoy Cruz	0	(0)
2011	→ Deportivo Guaymallén (loan)	1	(0)
2013	→ Magallanes (loan)	14	(0)
2014	→ Deportivo Maipú (loan)	4	(0)
2015–2018	Estudiantes SL	77	(1)
2018–2019	Huracán Las Heras	23	(0)
2019	Mitre	4	(0)
2020–2021	Huracán Las Heras	32	(0)
2022	Gimnasia de Mendoza	2	(0)
2022	Juventud Unida	15	(0)
2022–2023	FADEP	2	(0)
2024–	Juventud Unida Universitario	8	(0)
- * Club domestic league appearances and goals as of 8 November 2024

Juan Manuel Marital Carmona (born 25 May 1993) is an Argentine footballer who plays as a left-back for Juventud Unida Universitario.

== Career ==
A left-back, Marital professionally debuted with Godoy Cruz, then Argentine Primera División member. In 2013, he was loaned out to Chilean club Magallanes in the Primera B.

In 2024, Marital played for Juventud Unida Universitario.
