= Mauro Maidana =

Argentine footballer

Personal information
- Full name: Mauro Ángel Maidana
- Date of birth: 12 July 1990 (age 36)
- Place of birth: Esperanza, Argentina
- Height: 1.76 m (5 ft 9 in)
- Position: Left-back

Team information
- Current team: Deportivo Táchira
- Number: 22

Youth career
- Unión Santa Fe

Senior career*
Years	Team	Apps	(Gls)
2009–2016	Unión Santa Fe	93	(1)
2016	→ Douglas Haig (loan)	18	(0)
2016–2018	Independiente Rivadavia	47	(1)
2018–2019	Argentinos Juniors	2	(0)
2019–2020	Mitre	20	(0)
2020–2021	All Boys	34	(1)
2022–2023	Independiente Rivadavia	68	(3)
2024–	Deportivo Táchira	35	(3)
- * Club domestic league appearances and goals as of 18:02, 27 May 2025 (UTC)

Mauro Ángel Maidana (born 12 July 1990) is an Argentine professional footballer who plays as a left-back for Deportivo Táchira.

== Career ==
Unión Santa Fe were Maidana's first senior team. After making his debut in August 2009 against Gimnasia y Esgrima, he scored his first goal in the following October during a victory at home to Olimpo. In total, Maidana was selected in ninety-five fixtures in all competitions for Unión Santa Fe. Douglas Haig completed the loan signing of Maidana ahead of the 2016 Primera B Nacional. Nineteen appearances followed, which preceded him returning to his parent club but subsequently departing permanently to Independiente Rivadavia. Maidana remained for two seasons, 2016–17 & 2017–18, scoring once in forty-eight games.

On 4 July 2018, Maidana joined Primera División side Argentinos Juniors. His first appearance arrived a month later in a Copa Argentina tie with Defensa y Justicia. Just two further appearances would follow, prior to his departure in July 2019 to Mitre of Primera B Nacional. After twenty matches for them, Maidana moved across the division to All Boys in October 2020.

== Career statistics ==
As of 25 October 2020.

Club statistics
Club	Season	League			Cup		League Cup		Continental		Other		Total	
Club	Season	Division	Apps	Goals	Apps	Goals	Apps	Goals	Apps	Goals	Apps	Goals	Apps	Goals
Unión Santa Fe	2009–10	Primera B Nacional	18	1	0	0	—		—		0	0	18	1
Unión Santa Fe	2010–11	Primera B Nacional	18	0	0	0	—		—		0	0	18	0
Unión Santa Fe	2011–12	Primera División	7	0	0	0	—		—		0	0	7	0
Unión Santa Fe	2012–13	Primera División	14	0	1	0	—		—		0	0	15	0
Unión Santa Fe	2013–14	Primera B Nacional	21	0	1	0	—		—		0	0	22	0
Unión Santa Fe	2014	Primera B Nacional	0	0	0	0	—		—		0	0	0	0
Unión Santa Fe	2015	Primera División	5	0	0	0	—		—		0	0	5	0
Unión Santa Fe	2016	Primera División	0	0	0	0	—		—		0	0	0	0
Unión Santa Fe	Total		93	1	2	0	—		—		0	0	95	1
Douglas Haig (loan)	2016	Primera B Nacional	18	0	1	0	—		—		0	0	19	0
Independiente Rivadavia	2016–17	Primera B Nacional	24	0	1	0	—		—		0	0	25	0
Independiente Rivadavia	2017–18	Primera B Nacional	23	1	0	0	—		—		0	0	23	1
Independiente Rivadavia	Total		47	1	1	0	—		—		0	0	48	1
Argentinos Juniors	2018–19	Primera División	2	0	1	0	—		—		0	0	3	0
Mitre	2019–20	Primera B Nacional	20	0	1	0	—		—		0	0	21	0
All Boys	2020–21	Primera B Nacional	0	0	0	0	—		—		0	0	0	0
Career total			180	2	6	0	—		—		0	0	186	2

== Honours ==
Independiente Rivadavia

- Primera Nacional: 2023
