= Lucas Ceballos (footballer, born 1987) =

Argentine professional footballer

Personal information
- Full name: Lucas Esteban Ceballos
- Date of birth: 3 January 1987 (age 39)
- Place of birth: San Juan, Argentina
- Height: 1.65 m (5 ft 5 in)
- Position: Defender

Team information
- Current team: Mitre

Senior career*
Years	Team	Apps	(Gls)
2007–2010	Sportivo Desamparados	102	(5)
2010–2016	Godoy Cruz	123	(1)
2016–2018	Colón	32	(0)
2018–2019	Patronato	8	(0)
2019–	Mitre	0	(0)
- * Club domestic league appearances and goals as of 22:45, 7 August 2019 (UTC)

Lucas Esteban Ceballos (born 3 January 1987) is an Argentine professional footballer who plays as a defender for Mitre.

== Career ==
Ceballos' career began in 2007 with Torneo Argentino A club Sportivo Desamparados. He remained with the club for three years and subsequently made one hundred and two appearances and scored five goals. In June 2010, Ceballos departed to sign for Argentine Primera División side Godoy Cruz. He made six appearances in his debut season for Godoy, prior to making one hundred and seventeen more appearances in his next six campaigns with them. In his ninety-fifth league game for Godoy he scored his first goal, scoring the third in a 3–0 win against Crucero del Norte.

On 29 June 2016, Ceballos joined fellow Primera División side Colón. His first game for Colón came a month later in a league match versus Aldosivi. Patronato signed Ceballos in June 2018.

== Career statistics ==
As of 9 September 2018

Appearances and goals by club, season and competition
Club	Season	League			Cup		Continental		Other		Total	
Club	Season	Division	Apps	Goals	Apps	Goals	Apps	Goals	Apps	Goals	Apps	Goals
Godoy Cruz	2010–11	Primera División	6	0	0	0	—		0	0	6	0
Godoy Cruz	2011–12	Primera División	26	0	0	0	6 (Note: Appearances in Copa Libertadores)	0	0	0	32	0
Godoy Cruz	2012–13	Primera División	18	0	3	0	—		0	0	21	0
Godoy Cruz	2013–14	Primera División	13	0	1	0	—		0	0	14	0
Godoy Cruz	2014	Primera División	18	0	0	0	0	0	0	0	18	0
Godoy Cruz	2015	Primera División	25	1	1	0	—		0	0	26	1
Godoy Cruz	2016	Primera División	17	0	0	0	—		0	0	17	0
Godoy Cruz	Total		123	1	5	0	6	0	0	0	134	1
Colón	2016–17	Primera División	27	0	0	0	—		0	0	27	0
Colón	2017–18	Primera División	5	0	2	0	0	0	0	0	7	0
Colón	Total		32	0	2	0	0	0	0	0	34	0
Patronato	2018–19	Primera División	4	0	1	0	—		0	0	5	0
Career totals			159	1	8	0	6	0	0	0	173	1
