= Mateo Montenegro =

Argentine footballer

Personal information
- Full name: Mateo Montenegro
- Date of birth: 29 August 1998 (age 28)
- Place of birth: Santiago del Estero, Argentina
- Position: Midfielder

Team information
- Current team: Mitre

Youth career
- Central Córdoba SdE
- Vélez Sarsfield
- Independiente
- –2019: Boca Juniors
- 2019–2020: Central Córdoba SdE

Senior career*
Years	Team	Apps	(Gls)
2020–2023	Central Córdoba SdE	21	(0)
2022	→ Mitre (loan)	6	(0)
2022	→ Tristán Suárez (loan)	19	(0)
2023–2024	Tristán Suárez	24	(1)
2024	Gimnasia Mendoza	1	(0)
2024–2025	Almagro	16	(0)
2025–2026	Nueva Chicago	10	(0)
2026–	Mitre	9	(0)
- * Club domestic league appearances and goals as of 17:25, 2 May 2026 (UTC)

Mateo Montenegro (born 28 August 1998) is an Argentine professional footballer who plays as a midfielder for Mitre.

== Professional career ==
Mateo Montenegro started his career at Central Córdoba in Santiago del Estero, where he played in the club's youth teams. At the age of 16, he tried his luck at Vélez Sarsfield in Buenos Aires, where he did not play much until he decided to go to Independiente at the age of 17, following a special request from reserve team coach Claudio Vivas. He later moved to Boca Juniors, until he returned to Central Córdoba in 2019.

Montenegro made his professional debut with Central Córdoba in a 1-0 Argentine Primera División win over Colón on 25 January 2020.

In February 2022, Montenegro was loaned out to Primera Nacional club Mitre until the end of the year. Due to lack of playing time, the spell was terminated and he was instead loaned out to Tristán Suárez in June 2022 for the remainder of the year.
