= Nicolás Sánchez (footballer, born 1997) =

Argentine professional footballer

Personal information
- Full name: Nicolás Sánchez González
- Date of birth: 27 May 1997 (age 29)
- Place of birth: Béccar, Argentina
- Height: 1.68 m (5 ft 6 in)
- Position: Midfielder

Team information
- Current team: Racing Córdoba

Youth career
- Tigre

Senior career*
Years	Team	Apps	(Gls)
2018–2019	All Boys	29	(1)
2020–2023	Deportivo Armenio	90	(4)
2024–	Racing Córdoba	49	(1)
- * Club domestic league appearances and goals as of 17:34, 15 August 2025 (UTC)

Nicolás Sánchez González (born 27 May 1997) is an Argentine professional footballer who plays as a midfielder for Racing Córdoba.

== Career ==
Sánchez began in the youth system of Tigre, which preceded a move to All Boys on 3 August 2018; after a three-week trial. Pablo De Muner selected him for his senior debut on matchday three against Sacachispas in Primera B Metropolitana. In the return fixture in the succeeding February, Sánchez netted his opening goal in a 0–2 win for All Boys.

== Career statistics ==
As of 17 April 2019.

Appearances and goals by club, season and competition
Club	Season	League			Cup		Continental		Other		Total	
Club	Season	Division	Apps	Goals	Apps	Goals	Apps	Goals	Apps	Goals	Apps	Goals
All Boys	2018–19	Primera B Metropolitana	25	1	0	0	—		0	0	25	1
Career total			25	1	0	0	—		5	0	25	1
