= Luis Ojeda =

Argentine footballer

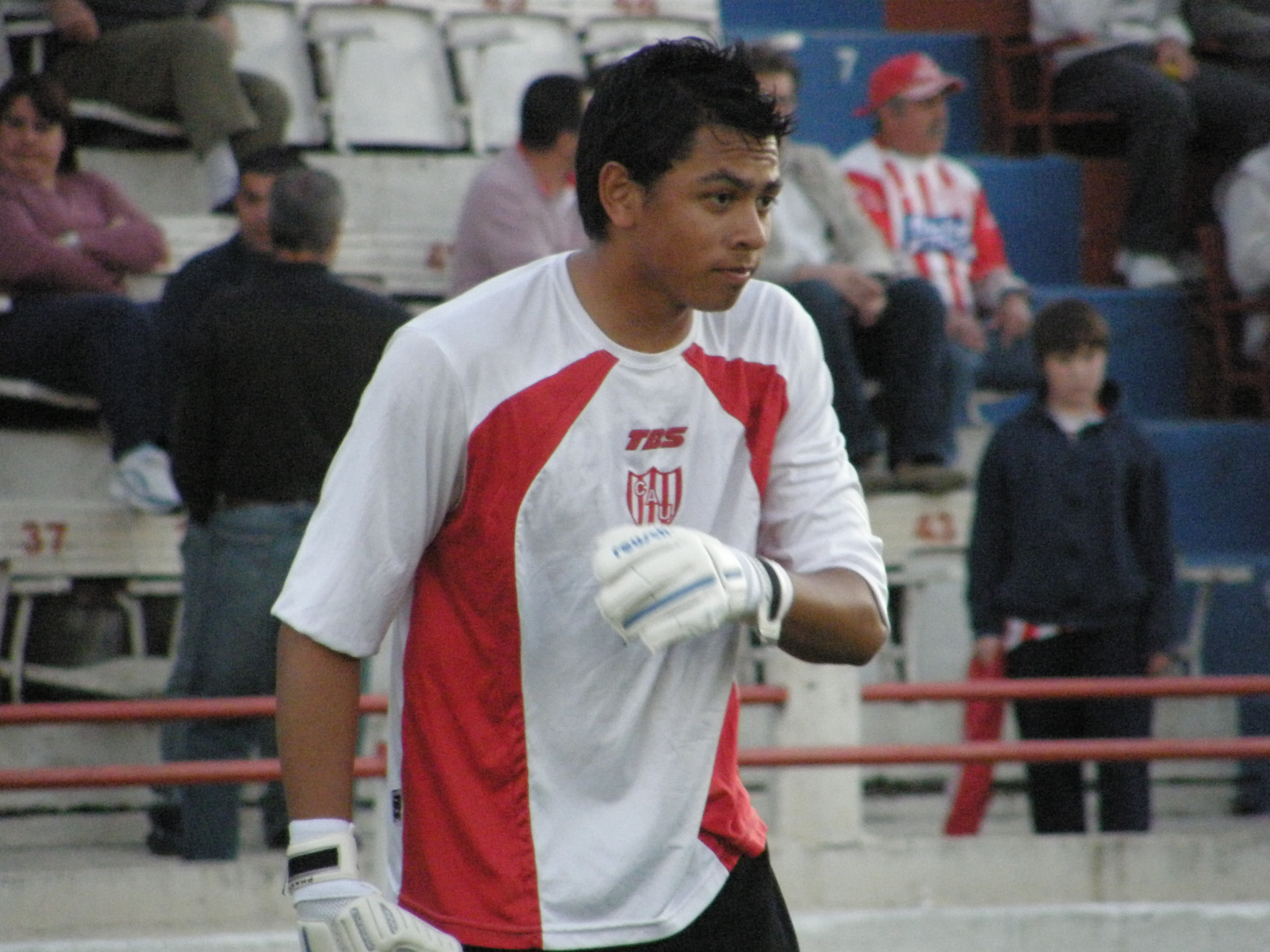
- portrait of Luis Alberto Ojeda

Personal information
- Full name: Luis Alberto Ojeda
- Date of birth: March 21, 1990 (age 36)
- Place of birth: Romang, Santa Fe, Argentina
- Height: 1.83 m (6 ft 0 in)
- Position: Goalkeeper

Team information
- Current team: Boca Unidos

Youth career
- Unión Santa Fe

Senior career*
Years	Team	Apps	(Gls)
2008–2009	Unión Santa Fe	47	(0)
2009–2015	Argentinos Juniors	82	(0)
2015–2017	Venados	28	(0)
2017	Veracruz	0	(0)
2017	JEF United Chiba	5	(0)
2018	Atlético Bucaramanga	17	(0)
2018–2019	Cafetaleros	11	(0)
2019–2020	Mitre	20	(0)
2020	Wilstermann	0	(0)
2021–2022	Platense	16	(0)
2022	→ Sol de América (loan)	39	(0)
2023	Atlético Tucumán	0	(0)
2024–2025	Gimnasia Mendoza	12	(0)
2025–2026	Unión Tarija	4	(0)
2026–	Boca Unidos	2	(0)
- * Club domestic league appearances and goals as of 17:04, 30 March 2026 (UTC)

Luis Alberto Ojeda (born 21 March 1990) is an Argentine football goalkeeper who plays for Boca Unidos.

== Career ==
Ojeda began his playing career with local team Unión de Santa Fe of the Argentine 2nd division in 2008.

In 2009, he was signed by Argentinos Juniors as a reserve keeper. He did not play in any games during the Apertura 2009 but he got several chances to play in the Clausura 2010 championship following injuries to 1st choice goalkeeper Nicolás Peric. He made his Argentinos Juniors debut in a 0–1 away win against Racing Club on 14 March 2010. He also made an appearance in Argentinos 2 final games of the Clausura 2010 championship, helping the club to secure their first league championship for 25 years. He left Argentinos Juniors in June 2015, after requesting a raise to 300,000 pesos per month.

== Titles ==
Argentinos Juniors

- Argentine Primera División (1): Clausura 2010
