= José Luis Torres (footballer, born 1995) =

Argentine footballer

Personal information
- Full name: José Luis Torres
- Date of birth: 17 July 1995 (age 31)
- Place of birth: Santiago del Estero, Argentina
- Position: Forward

Youth career
- Comercio Central Unidos

Senior career*
Years	Team	Apps	(Gls)
- Independiente de Fernández
2015	Comercio Central Unidos		
2016	Unión Santiago	7	(0)
2016–2018	Comercio Central Unidos		
2018–	Mitre	1	(0)
- * Club domestic league appearances and goals as of 10:09, 12 December 2018 (UTC)

José Luis Torres (born 17 July 1995) is an Argentine professional footballer who plays as a forward for Mitre.

== Career ==
Torres had a youth spell with Comercio Central Unidos. He first featured at senior level for Independiente de Fernández, prior to returning to Comercio Central Unidos. He featured for the Santiago del Estero outfit in 2015, which preceded a move to Unión Santiago. He was selected nine times in all competitions by the fellow fourth tier side. He returned to Comercio Central Unidos in 2016, remaining until mid-2018 whilst taking his overall tallies for them to forty-eight appearances and seven goals. On 30 June, Torres joined Mitre of Primera B Nacional. He made his professional debut on 2 November versus Instituto.

== Career statistics ==
As of 12 December 2018.

Club statistics
Club	Season	League			Cup (Note: Includes the Copa Argentina)		League Cup		Continental		Other		Total	
Club	Season	Division	Apps	Goals	Apps	Goals	Apps	Goals	Apps	Goals	Apps	Goals	Apps	Goals
Unión Santiago	2016	Torneo Federal B	7	0	2	0	—		—		0	0	9	0
Mitre	2018–19	Primera B Nacional	1	0	0	0	—		—		0	0	1	0
Career total			8	0	2	0	—		—		0	0	10	0
