= Daniel Candeias =

Portuguese footballer

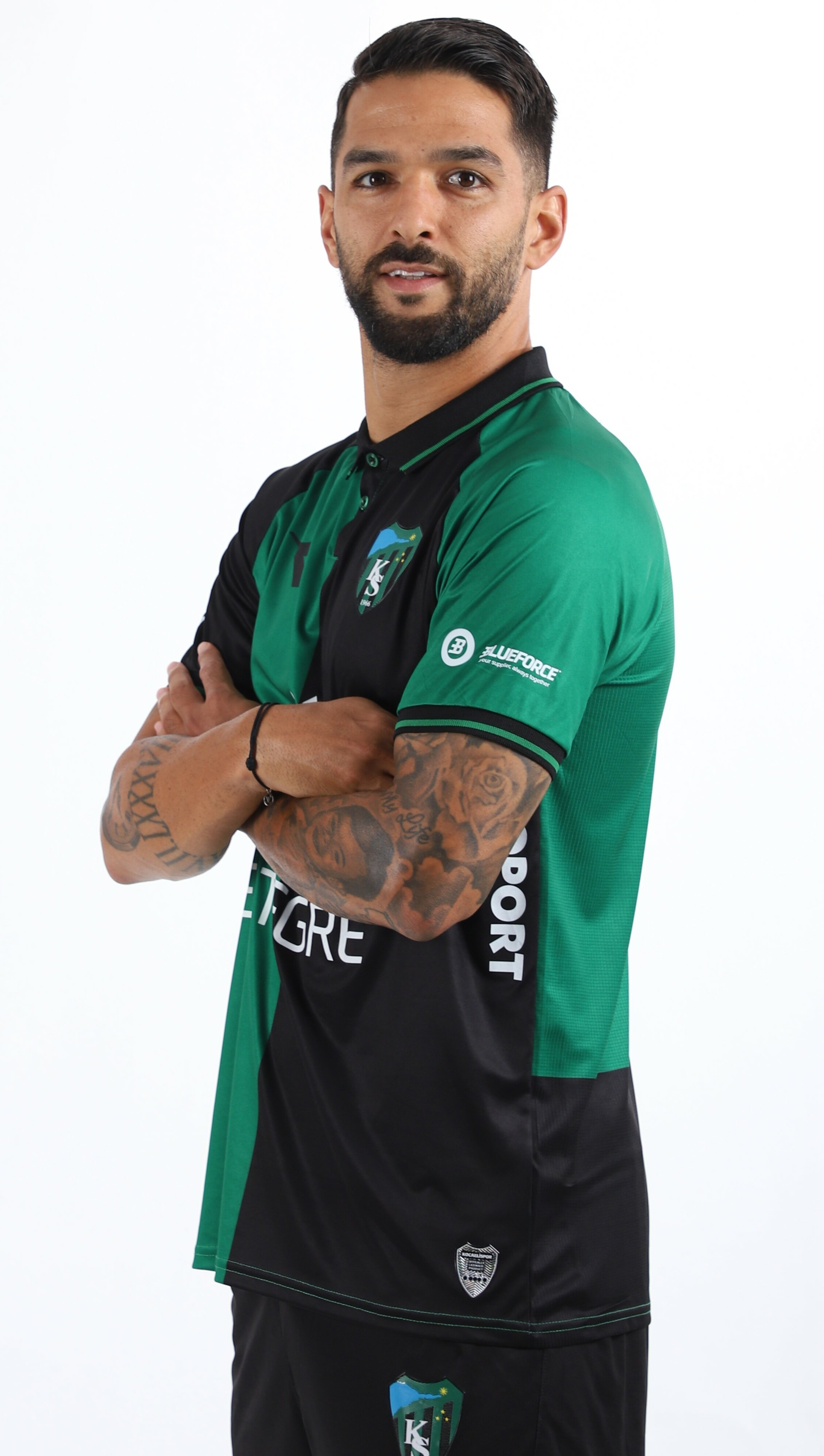
- Candeias with Kocaelispor in 2023

Personal information
- Full name: Daniel João Santos Candeias
- Date of birth: 25 February 1988 (age 38)
- Place of birth: Fornos de Algodres, Portugal
- Height: 1.77 m (5 ft 10 in)
- Position: Winger

Youth career
- 1997–2002: Fornos de Algodres
- 2002–2007: Porto

Senior career*
Years	Team	Apps	(Gls)
2007–2010	Porto	4	(0)
2007–2008	→ Varzim (loan)	27	(2)
2009	→ Rio Ave (loan)	5	(0)
2009–2010	→ Recreativo (loan)	10	(0)
2010	→ Paços Ferreira (loan)	13	(1)
2010–2014	Nacional	85	(13)
2010–2011	→ Portimonense (loan)	28	(1)
2014–2017	Benfica	0	(0)
2014–2015	→ 1. FC Nürnberg (loan)	16	(2)
2015	→ Granada (loan)	11	(0)
2015–2016	→ Metz (loan)	28	(2)
2016–2017	→ Alanyaspor (loan)	29	(4)
2017–2019	Rangers	70	(11)
2019–2021	Gençlerbirliği	67	(7)
2021–2023	Alanyaspor	62	(4)
2023–2024	Kocaelispor	35	(9)
2024–2025	Oliveirense	18	(2)
2025	Adanaspor	16	(2)
2025–2026	Académica	26	(0)
Total		550	(60)

International career
2003–2004	Portugal U16	5	(4)
2004–2005	Portugal U17	16	(11)
2006	Portugal U18	6	(0)
2006–2007	Portugal U19	15	(3)
2008	Portugal U20	8	(2)
2008–2010	Portugal U21	15	(1)
2011	Portugal U23	2	(1)
- * Club domestic league appearances and goals

Daniel João Santos Candeias (born 25 February 1988) is a Portuguese former professional footballer who played as a winger.

He was on the books of both Porto and Benfica, where he was mostly loaned out, and amassed most of his 135 Primeira Liga appearances and 15 goals while at Nacional. He also played over 100 games in the Turkish Süper Lig with Alanyaspor and Gençlerbirliği, and had spells in Spain, Germany, France and Scotland.

== Club career ==
=== Porto ===
Born in Fornos de Algodres, Guarda District, Candeias started his professional career with FC Porto in the 2008–09 season, after emerging through the club's youth ranks and having served a loan at Varzim S.C. in the Segunda Liga. He made his official debut for the former in late August, in the 2–0 defeat to Sporting CP in the Supertaça Cândido de Oliveira.

After having appeared scarcely throughout his first year (also playing ten minutes in the 4–0 loss against Arsenal in the group stage of the UEFA Champions League), Candeias was loaned in late January to league strugglers Rio Ave FC, until the end of the campaign. For 2009–10 another loan ensued, as he moved to Recreativo de Huelva in the Spanish Segunda División.

However, after a few months during which he appeared infrequently, Candeias returned to Portugal in late January 2010 to join F.C. Paços de Ferreira, again on loan. His first match for his new team was a 1–2 home loss against G.D. Chaves in the quarter-finals of the Taça de Portugal. His maiden appearance in the Primeira Liga for them occurred on 7 February, as he featured 12 minutes of the 2–1 away victory over Vitória de Guimarães.

=== Nacional ===
In October 2010, Candeias moved to C.D. Nacional in the same league on a co-ownership deal. He was immediately loaned to Portimonense SC, appearing regularly as a starter but suffering top-flight relegation.

Upon returning to Funchal, Candeias made his debut in the UEFA Europa League second qualifying round against Fimleikafélag Hafnarfjarðar of Iceland; he came on as a late substitute in the second leg on 21 July 2011 and scored to conclude a 2–0 win (3–1 aggregate). He netted 15 more goals for the side, including the winner with his first touch from the bench in a 2–1 comeback against C.S. Marítimo in the Madeira derby on 21 April 2013, and the opener of a victory of the same score over his former club Porto the following 30 March, in which he also assisted the decider by Mario Rondón at the Estádio da Madeira.

=== Benfica ===
On 3 July 2014, Candeias signed for Portuguese champions S.L. Benfica, promising to "give everything" for the club. He failed to appear in any competitive games, however, being successively loaned to 1. FC Nürnberg in Germany, Granada CF in Spain, FC Metz in France and Alanyaspor in Turkey.

=== Rangers ===
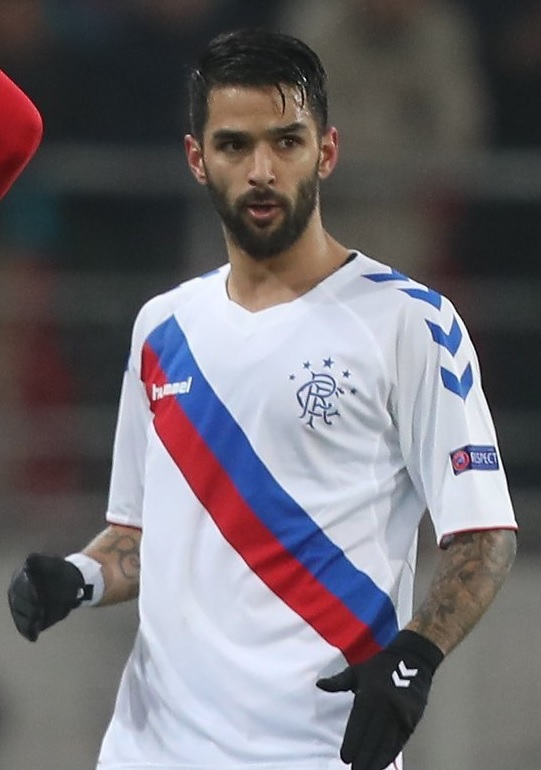
Candeias with Rangers in 2018

On 11 June 2017, Candeias joined Scottish club Rangers on a two-year deal, for a reported transfer fee of £700,000. He made his debut 18 days later, playing 31 minutes in a 1–0 home win over FC Progrès Niederkorn in the UEFA Europa League.

Candeias scored his first goal for his new team on 9 August 2017, in a 6–0 rout of Dunfermline Athletic in the Scottish League Cup. He netted in an Old Firm game on 11 March 2018 to give them a 2–1 lead in a 3–2 loss to Celtic at Ibrox Park. Three days later, he extended his contract until the summer of 2020.

Candeias was voted Rangers' Player of the Year in his first season.

=== Return to Turkey ===
On 22 July 2019, Candeias signed a two-year contract at Gençlerbirliği S.K. of the Turkish Süper Lig. His three goals of his first season in Ankara were all scored on 19 October in a 6–0 win at Antalyaspor, in which he added two assists to his hat-trick.

Having suffered relegation, Candeias returned to Alanyaspor on a deal of the same length in June 2021. Accompanying compatriots José Marafona, Wilson Eduardo and João Novais, he scored his first goal of his new spell away to Galatasaray S.K. on 19 September, coming off the bench to decide the game with three minutes remaining.

Remaining in the same country, but now in its second tier, 35-year-old Candeias signed for Kocaelispor on 20 July 2023. He announced his retirement on 3 September 2026.

== International career ==
After having made his Porto debut in 2008, Candeias was soon called up to the Portugal under-21 team. He won his first cap on 5 September of that year, coming on as a 58th-minute substitute for Vieirinha in a 2–0 away loss to England for the 2009 UEFA European Championship qualifiers.

== Career statistics ==
As of match played on 20 July 2019

Appearances and goals by club, season and competition
Club	Season	League			Cup		League Cup		Other		Total	
Club	Season	Division	Apps	Goals	Apps	Goals	Apps	Goals	Apps	Goals	Apps	Goals
Porto	2008–09	Primeira Liga	4	0	0	0	0	0	2 (Note: One appearance in UEFA Champions League, one appearance in Supertaça Cândido de Oliveira)	0	6	0
Rio Ave (loan)	2008–09	Primeira Liga	5	0	0	0	0	0	0	0	5	0
Recreativo (loan)	2009–10	Segunda División	10	0	3	2	0	0	0	0	13	2
Paços Ferreira (loan)	2009–10	Primeira Liga	13	1	1	0	0	0	0	0	14	1
Nacional	2011–12	Primeira Liga	28	4	4	1	2	1	6 (Note: Appearances in UEFA Europa League)	1	40	7
Nacional	2012–13	Primeira Liga	28	5	1	0	2	0	0	0	31	5
Nacional	2013–14	Primeira Liga	29	4	0	0	2	0	0	0	31	4
Nacional	Total		85	13	5	1	6	1	6	1	102	16
Portimonense (loan)	2010–11	Primeira Liga	28	1	1	0	0	0	0	0	29	1
Nürnberg (loan)	2014–15	2. Bundesliga	16	2	0	0	0	0	0	0	16	2
Granada (loan)	2014–15	La Liga	11	0	0	0	0	0	0	0	11	0
Metz (loan)	2015–16	Ligue 2	28	2	1	0	0	0	0	0	29	2
Alanyaspor (loan)	2016–17	Süper Lig	29	4	1	0	0	0	0	0	30	4
Rangers	2017–18	Scottish Premiership	37	6	3	0	3	2	2	0	45	8
Rangers	2018–19	Scottish Premiership	33	5	5	0	2	0	12	1	52	6
Rangers	Total		70	11	8	0	5	2	14	1	97	14
Career totals			299	34	20	3	11	3	22	2	352	42

== Honours ==
Porto

- Primeira Liga: 2008–09
- Taça de Portugal: 2008–09

Individual

- Scottish Premiership top assist provider: 2017–18
- Rangers Player of the Year: 2017–18
