= Tiago Ferreyra =

Argentine footballer

Personal information
- Full name: Tiago Martín Ferreyra
- Date of birth: 17 April 2002 (age 24)
- Place of birth: Nueva Galia, Argentina
- Height: 1.89 m (6 ft 2 in)
- Position: Centre-back

Team information
- Current team: Maipú (on loan from Mitre SdE)

Youth career
- Juventud Unida Universitario

Senior career*
Years	Team	Apps	(Gls)
2020–2024	Juventud Unida Universitario	27	(1)
2022–2023	→ Villa Belgrano (loan)	10	(0)
2024	→ Mitre SdE (loan)	22	(0)
2024–	Mitre SdE	9	(0)
2024	→ Defensa y Justicia (loan)	1	(0)
2025	→ Deportes Iquique (loan)	7	(0)
2025	→ San Luis (loan)	5	(1)
2026–	→ Maipú (loan)	3	(0)
- * Club domestic league appearances and goals as of 12:09, 19 June 2026 (UTC)

Tiago Martín Ferreyra (born 17 April 2002) is an Argentine footballer who plays as a centre-back for Primera Nacional club Maipú on loan from Mitre SdE.

== Career ==
Born in Nueva Galia, San Luis, Argentina, Ferreyra is a product of Juventud Unida Universitario and was promoted to the first team in September 2020. In 2022–2023, he played for Villa Belgrano. In 2024, he was loaned out to Mitre on a deal until December of the same year.

In August 2024, Mitre acquired the 80% of his rights on a deal until December 2028 and loaned him to Defensa y Justicia in the Argentine Primera División. In January 2025, he moved on loan to Chilean Primera División club Deportes Iquique. In the second half of the year, he switched to San Luis de Quillota in the Liga de Ascenso.
