= Claudio Salto =

Argentine footballer

Personal information
- Full name: Claudio Gabriel Salto
- Date of birth: 4 January 1995 (age 31)
- Place of birth: Bragado, Argentina
- Position: Forward

Team information
- Current team: Mitre

Youth career
- River Plate

Senior career*
Years	Team	Apps	(Gls)
2015–2018	River Plate	1	(0)
2016–2017	→ Freamunde (loan)	5	(1)
2018–2020	Fénix de Pilar		
2020	UAI Urquiza	19	(2)
2020–2022	Acassuso	33	(2)
2022–2023	Güemes	31	(3)
2023–2025	Defensores de Belgrano	56	(17)
2025–2026	San Miguel	19	(1)
2026–	Mitre	7	(1)
- * Club domestic league appearances and goals as of 17:33, 2 May 2026 (UTC)

Claudio Gabriel Salto (born 4 January 1995) is an Argentine football player who plays for Mitre.

== Club career ==
He made his professional debut in the Argentine Primera División for River Plate on 15 October 2015 in a game against Defensa y Justicia.
