= Pablo Minissale =

Argentine footballer (born 2001)

Personal information
- Full name: Pablo Agustín Minissale
- Date of birth: 14 January 2001 (age 25)
- Place of birth: San Martín, Argentina
- Height: 1.82 m (6 ft 0 in)
- Position: Centre-back

Team information
- Current team: Mitre (on loan from Argentinos Juniors)

Youth career
- Argentinos Juniors

Senior career*
Years	Team	Apps	(Gls)
2021–	Argentinos Juniors	33	(0)
2024	→ Central Córdoba SdE (loan)	10	(0)
2024	→ Tigre (loan)	0	(0)
2025	→ Deportivo Madryn (loan)	14	(0)
2026–	→ Mitre (loan)	8	(0)
- * Club domestic league appearances and goals as of 17:14, 2 May 2026 (UTC)

Pablo Agustín Minissale (born 14 January 2001) is an Argentine professional footballer who plays as a centre-back for Mitre on loan from Argentinos Juniors.

== Career ==
Minissale joined the youth system of Argentinos Juniors at a young age, having played his very early years in his hometown. He signed his first professional contract with the club on 24 August 2020, as the centre-back penned terms until 31 December 2022. Minissale was soon promoted into the first-team squad under manager Diego Dabove, notably featuring across pre-season; including in friendlies with Boca Juniors and Arsenal de Sarandí. He made a matchday squad for the first time under Gabriel Milito for a Copa de la Liga Profesional away defeat to Rosario Central on 15 February 2021, though he wasn't subbed on.

Minissale's senior debut arrived in the Copa de la Liga on 8 March 2021 at the Estadio Monumental Antonio Vespucio Liberti against River Plate, as he replaced Carlos Quintana after sixty-six minutes of an eventual 1–0 victory.

== Career statistics ==
As of 9 March 2021.

Appearances and goals by club, season and competition
Club	Season	League			Cup		League Cup		Continental		Other		Total	
Club	Season	Division	Apps	Goals	Apps	Goals	Apps	Goals	Apps	Goals	Apps	Goals	Apps	Goals
Argentinos Juniors	2021 (Note: Soccerway counts Copa de la Liga Profesional appearances as league appearances.)	Primera División	1	0	0	0	—		0	0	0	0	1	0
Career total			1	0	0	0	—		0	0	0	0	1	0
