= Agustín Verdugo =

Argentinian association football player

Personal information
- Full name: Fabio Agustín Verdugo
- Date of birth: 18 September 1997 (age 29)
- Place of birth: San Rafael, Argentina
- Height: 1.69 m (5 ft 6 1/2 in)
- Position: Midfielder

Team information
- Current team: Huracán Las Heras

Youth career
- Deportivo Argentino
- 2012–2017: Godoy Cruz

Senior career*
Years	Team	Apps	(Gls)
2017–2020	Godoy Cruz	29	(1)
2019–2020	→ Mitre SdE (loan)	14	(0)
2020–2021	Nueva Chicago	9	(0)
2021	Huracán Las Heras	19	(2)
2022	Independiente Rivadavia	20	(0)
2023	Huracán Las Heras	28	(6)
2024	Llaneros	46	(4)
2025	Rangers	9	(0)
2025–	Huracán Las Heras	5	(0)
- * Club domestic league appearances and goals as of 3 May 2025

Fabio Agustín Verdugo (born 18 September 1997) is an Argentine professional footballer who plays as a midfielder for Argentinian club Huracán Las Heras.

== Career ==
Verdugo started in the youth of Deportivo Argentino, before joining Godoy Cruz. His senior career with the club got underway in 2017. He made his professional debut in a 0–0 draw with Defensa y Justicia on 7 May, prior to making eight further appearances in all competitions throughout the 2016–17 Argentine Primera División campaign. He netted his first pro goal on 14 April 2018 during a victory at home to Temperley.

In 2025, Verdugo signed with Chilean club Rangers de Talca from Colombian club Llaneros.

== Career statistics ==
As of 4 August 2018.

Club statistics
Club	Season	League			Cup (Note: Includes the Copa Argentina)		League Cup		Continental (Note: Includes the Copa Libertadores)		Other		Total	
Club	Season	Division	Apps	Goals	Apps	Goals	Apps	Goals	Apps	Goals	Apps	Goals	Apps	Goals
Godoy Cruz	2016–17	Primera División	8	0	1	0	—		0	0	0	0	9	0
Godoy Cruz	2017–18	Primera División	7	1	1	0	—		1 (Note: One appearance in 2017 Copa Libertadores)	0	0	0	9	1
Godoy Cruz	2018–19	Primera División	0	0	0	0	—		0	0	0	0	0	0
Career total			15	1	2	0	—		1	0	0	0	18	1
