= Leandro De Muner =

Argentine footballer

Personal information
- Full name: Leandro Andrés De Muner
- Date of birth: 10 April 1983 (age 43)
- Place of birth: Buenos Aires, Argentina
- Height: 1.78 m (5 ft 10 in)
- Position: Midfielder

Youth career
- Argentinos Juniors

Senior career*
Years	Team	Apps	(Gls)
2004–2006	Tigre	20	(0)
2006–2007	All Boys	35	(1)
2007–2008	Atlanta	33	(1)
2008–2009	Deportivo Morón	34	(0)
2010	Los Andes	19	(0)
2010–2011	San Martín T.	17	(0)
2011–2012	Temperley	9	(0)
2013	Acassuso	4	(0)
2013	San Martín T.	2	(0)
2014	JJ Urquiza	15	(0)
2014–2015	Unión Aconquija	47	(2)
2016–2019	Mitre	72	(5)
2019–2020	Sportivo Desamparados	18	(0)
2021	Juventud Alianza	7	(0)

Managerial career
- 2022: Mitre (reserves)
- 2022: Mitre
- * Club domestic league appearances and goals

Leandro Andrés De Muner (born 10 April 1983) is a retired Argentine professional footballer who played as a midfielder and football manager.

== Career ==
Argentinos Juniors were a youth club of De Muner's. He began his senior career in 2004 with Primera B Nacional's Tigre, staying for two years whilst featuring twenty times. Stints with All Boys and Atlanta followed in Primera B Metropolitana, prior to the midfielder moving to Deportivo Morón in 2008. After trialling at Alavés in 2009, Argentine third tier side Los Andes signed De Muner in early 2010; which preceded him joining San Martín months later. He made his debut on 5 September against Atlético de Rafaela. After spending one-and-a-half seasons with Temperley, De Muner featured for Acassuso and ex-club San Martín in 2013.

On 22 January 2014, De Muner joined Primera C Metropolitana side Justo José de Urquiza. He was selected for fifteen fixtures in 2013–14 as the club finished twentieth. De Muner subsequently spent the 2014 and 2015 Torneo Federal A campaigns with Unión Aconquija, netting two goals across forty-seven appearances in all competitions in the process. January 2016 saw De Muner depart to join Mitre. He scored goals against Sportivo Belgrano, Chaco For Ever, Juventud Antoniana and Sarmiento as they won promotion to Primera B Nacional in 2017–18.

== Coaching career ==
After retiring from football in 2021, it was confirmed in January 2022, that De Muner had returned to his former club, Mitre, as reserve team manager, as well as youth coordinator. On 29 March 2022, after Mitre-manager Arnaldo Sialle was fired, De Muner was appointed manager of the first team on interim basis. De Muner was in charge for two games (one draw and one defeat), before he was replaced by Pablo Ricchetti. There was no announcement as to whether De Muner continued at the club, which is why he seemed to be leaving Mitre at the time of the replacement.

== Personal life ==
De Muner's cousin, Pablo, is a former professional footballer and current football manager.

== Career statistics ==
As of 11 December 2018.

Club statistics
Club	Season	League			Cup (Note: Includes the Copa Argentina)		League Cup		Continental		Other		Total	
Club	Season	Division	Apps	Goals	Apps	Goals	Apps	Goals	Apps	Goals	Apps	Goals	Apps	Goals
Tigre	2004–05	Primera B Metropolitana	8	0	0	0	—		—		0	0	8	0
All Boys	2006–07	Primera B Metropolitana	35	1	0	0	—		—		0	0	35	1
Atlanta	2007–08	Primera B Metropolitana	33	1	0	0	—		—		0	0	33	1
Los Andes	2009–10	Primera B Metropolitana	19	0	0	0	—		—		0	0	19	0
San Martín	2010–11	Primera B Nacional	17	0	0	0	—		—		0	0	17	0
Temperley	2011–12	Primera B Metropolitana	9	0	0	0	—		—		0	0	9	0
Acassuso	2012–13	Primera B Metropolitana	4	0	0	0	—		—		0	0	4	0
San Martín	2013–14	Torneo Argentino A	2	0	0	0	—		—		0	0	2	0
Justo José de Urquiza	2013–14	Primera C Metropolitana	15	0	0	0	—		—		0	0	15	0
Unión Aconquija	2014	Torneo Federal A	13	2	0	0	—		—		5 (Note: Five appearances in the 2014 Torneo Federal A play-offs)	0	18	2
Unión Aconquija	2015	Torneo Federal A	26	0	0	0	—		—		3 (Note: Three appearances in the 2015 Torneo Federal A play-offs)	0	29	0
Unión Aconquija	Total		39	2	0	0	—		—		8	0	47	2
Mitre	2016	Torneo Federal A	10	0	0	0	—		—		2 (Note: Two appearances in the 2016 Torneo Federal A play-offs)	0	12	0
Mitre	2016–17	Torneo Federal A	24	3	1	0	—		—		5 (Note: Five appearances in the 2016–17 Torneo Federal A play-offs)	1 (Note: One goal in the 2016–17 Torneo Federal A play-offs)	30	4
Mitre	2017–18	Primera B Nacional	18	1	2	0	—		—		0	0	20	1
Mitre	2018–19	Primera B Nacional	8	0	0	0	—		—		0	0	8	0
Mitre	Total		60	4	3	0	—		—		7	1	70	5
Career total			241	8	3	0	—		—		15	1	259	9

== Honours ==
Tigre

- Primera B Metropolitana: 2004–05
