= Gabriel Tellas =

Argentine footballer (born 1992)

Personal information
- Full name: Gabriel Carlos Tellas
- Date of birth: 10 August 1992 (age 34)
- Place of birth: Formosa, Argentina
- Height: 1.85 m (6 ft 1 in)
- Position: Forward

Team information
- Current team: Excursionistas

Senior career*
Years	Team	Apps	(Gls)
2011–2014	Chacarita Juniors	17	(1)
2012–2013	→ Santamarina (loan)	3	(0)
2013–2014	→ Ituzaingó (loan)	31	(2)
2014–2015	Olimpo	0	(0)
2016–2017	Dock Sud	36	(7)
2017–2019	Argentino de Quilmes	38	(20)
2018–2019	→ All Boys (loan)	40	(18)
2019	All Boys	0	(0)
2019	→ Mitre SdE (loan)	9	(0)
2020–2021	Cobreloa	42	(15)
2022	Academia Cantolao	26	(4)
2023	Racing de Córdoba	4	(0)
2023–2024	Vida	35	(10)
2024	Brown de Adrogué	13	(2)
2025–2026	San Antonio Unido	21	(15)
2026–	Excursionistas	8	(2)
- * Club domestic league appearances and goals as of 18:33, 16 April 2026 (UTC)

Gabriel Carlos Tellas (born 10 August 1992) is an Argentine professional footballer who plays as a forward for Excursionistas.

== Career ==
Chacarita Juniors were Tellas' opening senior team. He made his bow in professional football on 10 September 2011 versus Atlanta, with Héctor Rivoira substituting the forward on in a goalless draw. Tellas scored his first goal during his eleventh appearance against Guillermo Brown; who won the fixture 5–2. Santamarina of Torneo Argentino A loaned Tellas on 15 August 2012. Three appearances followed. A further loan away then arrived, as he agreed terms with Ituzaingó. He scored twice across 2013–14 in Primera C Metropolitana. A permanent stint with Olimpo came in 2014; though he didn't feature in the Primera División.

In January 2016, Tellas completed a move to Dock Sud. Thirty-six matches and seven goals occurred in the fourth tier. Fellow Primera C Metropolitana outfit Argentino signed Tellas on 30 June 2017. He scored twenty times for them in his first season, as they lost in the promotion play-off finals to Justo José de Urquiza. Tellas, though, did go up to Primera B Metropolitana after being signed on loan by All Boys in July 2018. He made his debut in a draw with San Miguel in the succeeding month, which was followed by a hat-trick over Tristán Suárez in October.

== Career statistics ==
As of 19 April 2019.

Appearances and goals by club, season and competition
Club	Season	League			Cup		Continental		Other		Total	
Club	Season	Division	Apps	Goals	Apps	Goals	Apps	Goals	Apps	Goals	Apps	Goals
Chacarita Juniors	2011–12	Primera B Nacional	17	1	2	0	—		1 (Note: Appearance(s) in the Primera B Nacional play-offs)	1	20	2
Chacarita Juniors	2012–13	Primera B Metropolitana	0	0	0	0	—		0	0	0	0
Chacarita Juniors	2013–14	Primera B Metropolitana	0	0	0	0	—		0	0	0	0
Chacarita Juniors	Total		17	1	2	0	—		1	1	20	2
Santamarina (loan)	2012–13	Torneo Argentino A	3	0	0	0	—		0	0	3	0
Ituzaingó (loan)	2013–14	Primera C Metropolitana	31	2	0	0	—		0	0	31	2
Olimpo	2014	Primera División	0	0	0	0	—		0	0	0	0
Olimpo	2015	Primera División	0	0	0	0	—		0	0	0	0
Olimpo	Total		0	0	0	0	—		0	0	0	0
Argentino	2017–18	Primera C Metropolitana	38	20	0	0	—		0	0	38	20
Argentino	2018–19	Primera C Metropolitana	0	0	0	0	—		0	0	0	0
Argentino	Total		38	20	0	0	—		0	0	38	20
All Boys (loan)	2018–19	Primera B Metropolitana	32	14	0	0	—		0	0	32	14
Career total			121	37	2	0	—		1	1	124	38
