= Lucas Márquez (footballer, born 1988) =

Argentine footballer

Personal information
- Full name: Lucas Matías Márquez
- Date of birth: 25 October 1988 (age 38)
- Place of birth: Paraná, Argentina
- Height: 1.77 m (5 ft 9 1/2 in)
- Position: Defender

Team information
- Current team: Mitre

Youth career
- Patronato

Senior career*
Years	Team	Apps	(Gls)
2007–2018	Patronato	226	(8)
2018–2019	Gimnasia y Esgrima	26	(0)
2019–	Mitre	0	(0)
- * Club domestic league appearances and goals as of 23:30, 22 September 2019 (UTC)

Lucas Matías Márquez (born 25 October 1988) is an Argentine professional footballer who plays as a defender for Mitre.

== Career ==
Márquez began his senior footballing career in 2007, with Patronato in Torneo Argentino B. He made one hundred and eighty-eight appearances in his first nine seasons, as the club rose from Torneo Argentino B to the Argentine Primera División. In that spell, Márquez's professional debut arrived in October 2010 during a 1–0 Primera B Nacional victory over CAI while his first goal in professional football came in a defeat versus Deportivo Merlo on 28 April 2012. He made his Primera División bow in 2016 vs. Gimnasia y Esgrima (LP) at the Estadio Presbítero Bartolomé Grella. He left Patronato in 2018 to join Gimnasia y Esgrima (M).

== Career statistics ==
As of 9 September 2018.

Club statistics
Club	Season	League			Cup (Note: Includes the Copa Argentina)		League Cup		Continental		Other		Total	
Club	Season	Division	Apps	Goals	Apps	Goals	Apps	Goals	Apps	Goals	Apps	Goals	Apps	Goals
Gimnasia y Esgrima	2018–19	Primera B Nacional	2	0	0	0	—		—		0	0	2	0
Career total			2	0	0	0	—		—		0	0	2	0

== Honours ==
Patronato

- Torneo Argentino B: 2007–08
- Torneo Argentino A: 2009–10
