= Leandro Lencinas =

Argentinian association football player

Personal information
- Date of birth: 6 March 1995 (age 31)
- Place of birth: Rivadavia, Argentina
- Height: 1.74 m (5 ft 8 1/2 in)
- Position: Forward

Team information
- Current team: Atletico Argentino (Bell Ville)

Youth career
- Fénix de Rivadavia
- 2014–2017: Godoy Cruz

Senior career*
Years	Team	Apps	(Gls)
2018–2020	Godoy Cruz	13	(0)
2019–2020	→ Mitre (loan)	8	(1)
2020	Huracán Las Heras	7	(0)
2021	Juventud Unida Universitario	8	(0)
2022–	Atletico Argentino (Bell Ville)		
- * Club domestic league appearances and goals as of 20:06, 14 November 2024 (UTC)

Leandro Lencinas (born 6 March 1995) is an Argentine professional footballer who plays as a forward for Atletico Argentino (Bell Ville).

== Career ==
Lencinas had youth spells with Fénix de Rivadavia and Godoy Cruz. He was promoted into the first-team of Argentine Primera División side Godoy Cruz in 2018, midway through the 2017–18 season. He was an unused substitute for a victory over Chacarita Juniors on 26 January, before making his professional debut on 2 February during a goalless draw with Patronato. He featured a total of fifteen times up until July 2019, when the forward was loaned to Mitre of Primera B Nacional. His first appearance came against Ferro Carril Oeste on 8 September, before netting his first senior goal versus Barracas Central on 2 October.

On 6 August 2020, having recently ended his contract with Godoy Cruz, Lencinas signed an eighteen-month contract with Torneo Federal A's Huracán Las Heras.

== Career statistics ==
As of 27 September 2020.

Club statistics
Club	Season	League			Cup		League Cup		Continental		Other		Total	
Club	Season	Division	Apps	Goals	Apps	Goals	Apps	Goals	Apps	Goals	Apps	Goals	Apps	Goals
Godoy Cruz	2017–18	Primera División	8	0	0	0	—		0	0	0	0	8	0
Godoy Cruz	2018–19	Primera División	5	0	2	0	0	0	0	0	0	0	7	0
Godoy Cruz	2019–20	Primera División	0	0	0	0	0	0	—		0	0	0	0
Godoy Cruz	Total		13	0	2	0	0	0	0	0	0	0	15	0
Mitre (loan)	2019–20	Primera B Nacional	8	1	0	0	—		—		0	0	8	1
Huracán Las Heras	2020–21	Torneo Federal A	0	0	0	0	—		—		0	0	0	0
Career total			21	1	2	0	0	0	0	0	0	0	23	1
