= Estadio Doctores José y Antonio Castiglione =

Football stadium in Santiago del Estero, Argentina

Doctores José y Antonio Castiglione Stadium
- Estadio Doctores José y Antonio Castiglione
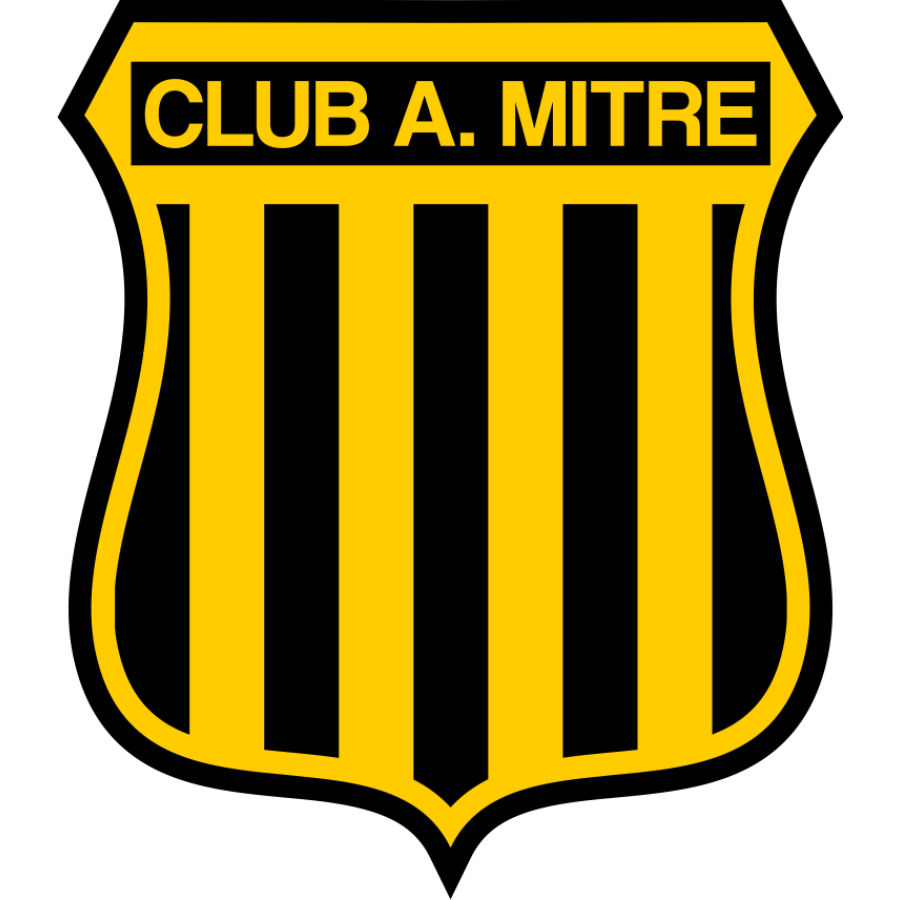

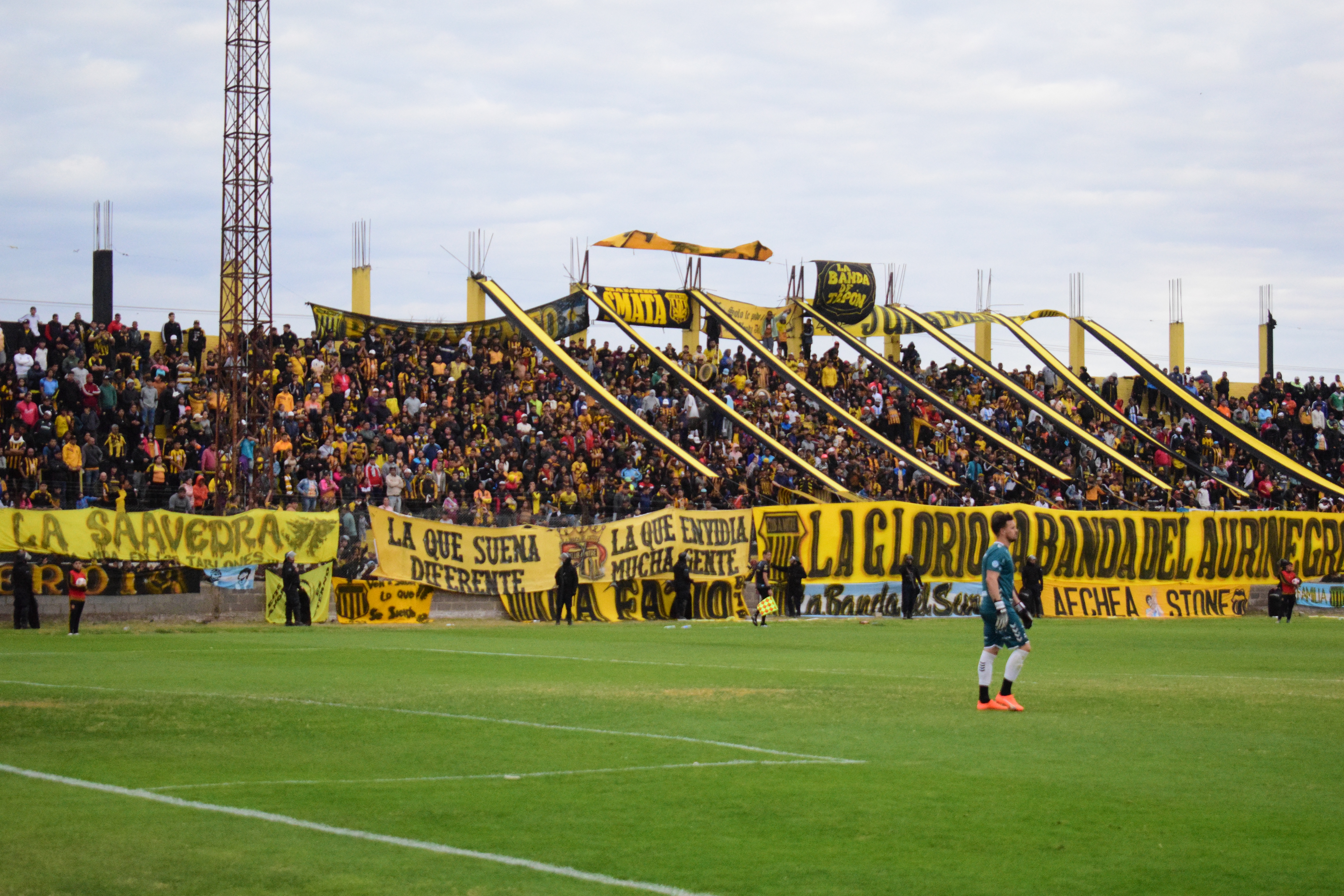
- The stadium in 2023
- Interactive map of Doctores José y Antonio Castiglione Stadium
- Address: Ave. Roca Sur and 3 de Febrero; Santiago del Estero; Argentina
- Coordinates: 27°47′34.43″S 64°14′57.6″W
- Owner: C. A. Mitre
- Capacity: 21,000
- Field size: 105 x 68

Construction
- Built: 1919
- Opened: June 10, 1919; 107 years ago

Tenant
- Mitre (SdE)

Estadio Doctores José y Antonio Castiglione or simply Estadio Doctores Castiglione is a football stadium located in the city of Santiago del Estero, in the province of the same name, Argentina. The venue is located in the "Barrio 8 de Abril" on Roca Sur Avenue and Tres de Febrero Street, it has a capacity for 21,000 people and is owned by the Club Atlético Mitre that plays in the Primera B Nacional, the second category of professional football in Argentina.

It is recognized as one of the stadiums with the best grass in the Argentine Northwest.

== History ==
=== Opening and first match ===
On June 10, 1919, it arose when the club's leaders decided to create the stalls, to have at least one "stand" to be able to play matches in the Santiagueña Soccer League and also to play friendlies, and they were going to inaugurate it in the match against Peñarol de Montevideo, of which the result is unknown due to its age and because there is no living witness to that mysterious result. Until that time, the stadium had a stall for 1,000 spectators (which is still standing today) and an Olympic fence where people were also located behind the fence.

The big Argentine and continental teams also visited the Miter facilities. It is remembered when, in the '60s, the National Team played a friendly. The clubs also made their way: Peñarol de Montevideo inaugurated the field. Boca Juniors (who was defeated in 1966) and River Plate also left behind Monumental, for whom Aurinegro -in 1984- turned the game around In 35', he beat him 6–3, and caused the dismissal of his coach Luis Cubilla. He also knew how to play against Independiente (against whom he debuted artificial light), San Lorenzo, Huracán, and the signatures.

=== Important Match ===
July 25, 1984, was not just another day for Aurinegros fans. On that day, the current stadium, which has a capacity of almost 9000, was inaugurated.

The inaugural game was against none other than Enzo Francescoli's Club Atlético River Plate. Mitre claimed a 6–3 victory and became the only team in history to score 6 goals in 35 minutes against River Plate.

In total the Institution collected around 800,000 thousand Argentine pesos.

==== Name change ====
In the years after 2017, the fans had the proposal to change the name of the stadium, to that of Arnaldo "Cacho" Sialle, Technical Director who achieved promotion with Mitre, He directed 29 games in the 2017-18 and 5 dates in the 2018-19 Primera B Nacional. He also directed the Match against Racing Club of Avellaneda, and progressed to the round of 32 of the Copa Argentina.

== Origin of name ==
The name of the stadium honors the names of the brothers José F.L. Castiglione, who directed the newspaper El Liberal de Santiago del Estero until his death in 1972 and Antonio Castiglione, businessman, founder of the first radio station in the province in 1937 with LV11 Radio del Norte, and of the first television station in Noroeste Argentino founding Telesiete Santiago through its company CAS TV S.A. in 1965, president of the club and provincial deputy in two periods, 1924 and 1940.

== Well-known people who stepped on the green grass of the Castiglione Stadium ==
When the history of Aurinegro, the Dean of Santiago football, is reviewed, it will be evident that great figures such as:

Javier Zanetti, Diego Milito, Gabriel Milito, Gabriel Brazenas, Ricardo Caruso Lombardi, Fernando Gago, Ricardo Centurión, "El burrito" Ortega, Sebastián Saja, Enzo Francescoli, Norberto Alonso, Daniel Passarella, el Loco Gatti, Antonio Roma, Silvio Marzolini, Antonio Rattín, Alberto Spencer (top scorer of the Copa Libertadores ),el Bambino Veira, Ángel Labruna, el Tolo Gallego, Mustard Merlo, Héctor Enrique, Argentine National Team and Uzbekistan U-20 (2023 squads) and many others from local and international football.

== Stadium Division ==
The stadium has a capacity for 21,000 people. The Doctores Castiglione is the third largest stadium in the province of Santiago del Estero, surpassed by the new and world-class Estadio Único Madre de Ciudades, owned by the Government of the province of Santiago del Estero and the Estadio Alfredo Terrera property of Club Atlético Central Córdoba.

Capacity and information of the stands
Grandstand	Street	Ability	Construction in	Opening
Walter Jiménez	3 de febrero	1,000	-	-
Slate and VIP	3 de febrero and Roca Sur Avenue	4,000	1919	1920
Popular	Francisca Jacques	7,000	2009	2014
Popular	Obispo de Victoria	8,500	1980	1984
Visitor	Pedro Pablo Olaechea	500 approx.	2020	Under construction
Total: 21,000

== See also ==
- List of football stadiums in Argentina
- Lists of stadiums
