= Emilio Di Fulvio =

Argentine professional footballer

Personal information
- Full name: Emilio Di Fulvio
- Date of birth: 17 May 1995 (age 31)
- Place of birth: Carreras, Argentina
- Height: 1.88 m (6 ft 2 in)
- Position: Goalkeeper

Team information
- Current team: Colegiales

Youth career
- 2009–2016: Rosario Central

Senior career*
Years	Team	Apps	(Gls)
2016–2018	Rosario Central	1	(0)
2016–2017	→ Douglas Haig (loan)	4	(0)
2018–2020	Mitre	2	(0)
2020–2023	Gimnasia Jujuy	9	(0)
2023–2024	Sarmiento de Resistencia	30	(0)
2024–	Colegiales	87	(0)
- * Club domestic league appearances and goals as of 17:10, 25 April 2026 (UTC)

Emilio Di Fulvio (born 17 May 1995) is an Argentine professional footballer who plays as a goalkeeper for Colegiales.

== Career ==
Di Fulvio started his career with Rosario Central, beginning in the youth ranks from 2009. On 1 August 2016, Douglas Haig loaned Di Fulvio for the 2016–17 Primera B Nacional season. In total, he was an unused substitute forty times in all competitions but did make four appearances, which included his professional debut versus Flandria on 10 March 2017, as they were relegated to Torneo Federal A. He then returned to Rosario Central, subsequently making his first appearance for the club in a 3–0 loss to Patronato on 1 April 2018. Mitre completed the signing of Di Fulvio in the following July.

On 3 August 2020, Di Fulvio joined Gimnasia Jujuy.

== Career statistics ==
As of 11 September 2018.

Club statistics
Club	Season	League			Cup (Note: Includes the Copa Argentina)		League Cup		Continental (Note: Includes the Copa Sudamericana)		Other		Total	
Club	Season	Division	Apps	Goals	Apps	Goals	Apps	Goals	Apps	Goals	Apps	Goals	Apps	Goals
Rosario Central	2016–17	Primera División	0	0	0	0	—		—		0	0	0	0
Rosario Central	2017–18	Primera División	1	0	0	0	—		0	0	0	0	1	0
Rosario Central	Total		1	0	0	0	—		0	0	0	0	1	0
Douglas Haig (loan)	2016–17	Primera B Nacional	4	0	0	0	—		—		0	0	4	0
Mitre	2018–19	Primera B Nacional	1	0	0	0	—		—		0	0	1	0
Career total			6	0	0	0	—		0	0	0	0	6	0
