= Nicolás Sánchez (footballer, born 1992) =

Argentine footballer

Personal information
- Full name: Nicolás Andrés Sánchez
- Date of birth: 21 February 1992 (age 34)
- Place of birth: Junín, Argentina
- Height: 1.80 m (5 ft 11 in)
- Position: Midfielder

Team information
- Current team: Tristán Suárez

Youth career
- Rivadavia de Junín
- Sarmiento
- → Racing Club (loan)

Senior career*
Years	Team	Apps	(Gls)
2010–2016	Sarmiento	91	(2)
2016–2017	Godoy Cruz	13	(1)
2017–2018	Villa Dálmine	19	(1)
2018–2020	Mitre	10	(0)
2020–2022	Brown Adrogué	37	(3)
2022–2025	Deportivo Madryn	84	(10)
2025–2026	Agropecuario	21	(0)
2026–	Tristán Suárez	6	(0)
- * Club domestic league appearances and goals as of 17:19, 6 May 2026 (UTC)

Nicolás Andrés Sánchez (born 21 February 1992) is an Argentine professional footballer who plays as a midfielder for Tristán Suárez.

== Career ==
Sánchez started his youth career with Rivadavia de Junín in 1996, before joining Sarmiento and subsequently having a loan spell with Racing Club. His senior career began with Primera B Metropolitana club Sarmiento in 2010. He featured seventeen times over two seasons in Primera B Metropolitana, before making his first appearance in Primera B Nacional on 14 April 2013 during a 4–3 victory over Patronato. He scored his first goal for Sarmiento in May 2014 in a defeat to Huracán. In July 2016, after ninety-one appearances and two goals for Sarmiento, Sánchez departed to sign for fellow Primera División team Godoy Cruz.

He went on to score once in thirteen matches for Godoy Cruz during 2016–17 which they ended in fourteenth. On 18 August 2017, Sánchez joined Villa Dálmine of Primera B Nacional. He scored his first goal for Villa Dálmine in his sixth appearance, netting the second goal in a 2–1 win against Estudiantes. Sánchez completed a move to Mitre in June 2018.

== Career statistics ==
As of 6 September 2018.

Club statistics
Club	Season	League			Cup (Note: Includes the Copa Argentina)		League Cup		Continental (Note: Includes the Copa Libertadores)		Other		Total	
Club	Season	Division	Apps	Goals	Apps	Goals	Apps	Goals	Apps	Goals	Apps	Goals	Apps	Goals
Sarmiento	2010–11	Primera B Metropolitana	17	0	0	0	—		—		0	0	17	0
Sarmiento	2011–12	Primera B Metropolitana	0	0	0	0	—		—		0	0	0	0
Sarmiento	2012–13	Primera B Nacional	4	0	1	0	—		—		0	0	5	0
Sarmiento	2013–14	Primera B Nacional	23	1	1	0	—		—		0	0	24	1
Sarmiento	2014	Primera B Nacional	18	1	0	0	—		—		0	0	18	1
Sarmiento	2015	Primera División	21	0	0	0	—		—		0	0	21	0
Sarmiento	2016	Primera División	8	0	0	0	—		—		0	0	8	0
Sarmiento	Total		91	2	2	0	—		—		0	0	93	2
Godoy Cruz	2016–17	Primera División	13	1	0	0	—		2 (Note: Two appearances in 2017 Copa Libertadores)	0	0	0	15	1
Villa Dálmine	2017–18	Primera B Nacional	19	1	0	0	—		—		0	0	19	1
Mitre	2018–19	Primera B Nacional	1	0	0	0	—		—		0	0	1	0
Career total			124	4	2	0	—		2	0	0	0	128	4
