= Pablo De Muner =

Argentine footballer and manager

Personal information
- Full name: Pablo Daniel De Muner
- Date of birth: 14 April 1981 (age 45)
- Place of birth: Caseros, Argentina
- Height: 1.82 m (6 ft 0 in)
- Position: Right back

Youth career
- Argentinos Juniors

Senior career*
| Years | Team | Apps | (Gls) |
| 2000–2007 | Argentinos Juniors | 114 | (3) |
| 2007–2008 | Poli Ejido | 15 | (0) |
| 2008–2011 | San Martín Tucumán | 64 | (4) |
| 2011–2012 | Boca Unidos | 8 | (0) |
| 2012 | Deportivo Merlo | 8 | (0) |
| 2012 | Unión San Felipe | 14 | (2) |
| 2013–2014 | Oriente Petrolero | 29 | (3) |
| 2014 | Sol América | 3 | (0) |
| 2014–2015 | San Martín Tucumán | 10 | (2) |
| 2015–2017 | Barracas Central | 34 | (2) |
| Total | | 299 | (16) |

International career
| 2001 | Argentina U20 | | |

Managerial career
- 2017–2018: Independiente Rivadavia
- 2018–2019: All Boys
- 2019–2021: Defensa y Justicia (reserves)
- 2020: Defensa y Justicia (caretaker)
- 2021: Defensa y Justicia (caretaker)
- 2021–2022: San Martín de Tucumán
- 2023: O'Higgins
- 2023: Guaraní
- 2024: Melgar
- 2024–2025: Defensa y Justicia
- 2025: Águilas Doradas
- * Club domestic league appearances and goals

Pablo Daniel De Muner (born 14 April 1981) is an Argentine football manager and former player who played as a right back.

== Football career ==
De Muner was born in Caseros, Buenos Aires. A product of the youth system at Argentinos Juniors, he rose through the ranks to become team captain in 2007.

De Muner was, however, released in July of the same year, and had almost everything agreed with La Liga club Racing de Santander before the deal eventually failed. The defender also settled in Spain, signing on 30 August with Polideportivo Ejido in the country's second division.

In 2008, as the Andalusia side was relegated – with the player only appearing in 15 matches out of 42 – de Muner returned to Argentina to play for newly promoted San Martín de Tucumán in the Primera División, meeting the same fate.

== Coaching career ==
After retiring in 2017 at the age of 36, De Muner became a manager.

In the summer 2019, De Muner was hired as manager for Defensa y Justicia's reserve team. On 22 January 2020 the club announced, that first team manager Mariano Soso had left the club and De Muner would take charge of the team temporarily.

== Personal life ==
De Muner's cousin, Leandro, was also a footballer.
