= Juan Alessandroni =

Argentine footballer

Juan Alesandroni
Personal information
- Full name: Juan Ignacio Alesandroni
- Date of birth: 26 December 1988 (age 37)
- Place of birth: Pergamino, Argentina
- Position: Midfielder

Team information
- Current team: Mitre

Senior career*
Years	Team	Apps	(Gls)
2006–2010	Juventud Pergamino	96	(1)
2010–2015	Unión Mar del Plata	173	(1)
2016–	Mitre	288	(2)
- * Club domestic league appearances and goals as of 17:17, 2 May 2026 (UTC)

Juan Ignacio Alessandroni (born 26 December 1988) is an Argentine professional footballer who plays as a midfielder for Mitre.

== Career ==
Alesandroni started his career with Juventud Pergamino in 2006. He remained with the Torneo Argentino A team for four years, scoring one goal in ninety-six fixtures. 2010 saw the midfielder sign for fellow third tier outfit Unión Mar del Plata. His first goal for the club arrived on 26 September during a draw with Cipolletti. He made the last of his one hundred and seventy-nine appearances for Unión in November 2015 against Instituto in Primera B Nacional; following 2014 promotion. In January 2016, Alessandroni joined Mitre. After being selected forty-four times in two seasons, Mitre were promoted to Primera B Nacional for 2017–18.

== Career statistics ==
As of 11 December 2018.

Club statistics
Club	Season	League			Cup (Note: Includes the Copa Argentina)		League Cup		Continental		Other		Total	
Club	Season	Division	Apps	Goals	Apps	Goals	Apps	Goals	Apps	Goals	Apps	Goals	Apps	Goals
Unión Mar del Plata	2012–13	Torneo Argentino A	25	0	0	0	—		—		2 (Note: Two appearances in the 2012–13 Torneo Argentino A play-offs)	0	27	0
Unión Mar del Plata	2013–14	Torneo Argentino A	27	0	2	0	—		—		0	0	29	0
Unión Mar del Plata	2014	Torneo Federal A	14	0	1	0	—		—		1 (Note: One appearance in the 2014 Torneo Federal A play-offs)	0	16	0
Unión Mar del Plata	2015	Primera B Nacional	41	0	0	0	—		—		0	0	41	0
Unión Mar del Plata	Total		107	0	3	0	—		—		3	0	113	0
Mitre	2016	Torneo Federal A	12	0	0	0	—		—		2 (Note: Two appearances in the 2016 Torneo Federal A play-offs)	0	14	0
Mitre	2016–17	Torneo Federal A	25	0	0	0	—		—		5 (Note: Five appearances in the 2016–17 Torneo Federal A play-offs)	0	30	0
Mitre	2017–18	Primera B Nacional	21	0	2	0	—		—		0	0	23	0
Mitre	2018–19	Primera B Nacional	12	0	0	0	—		—		0	0	12	0
Mitre	Total		70	0	2	0	—		—		7	0	79	0
Career total			177	0	5	0	—		—		10	0	192	0
