= David Valdez (footballer) =

Argentine footballer

Personal information
- Full name: David Valdez
- Date of birth: 6 April 1993 (age 33)
- Place of birth: San Miguel de Tucumán, Argentina
- Height: 1.84 m (6 ft 1/2 in)
- Position: Midfielder

Team information
- Current team: Chaco For Ever

Senior career*
| Years | Team | Apps | (Gls) |
| 2013–2018 | Atlético Tucumán | 33 | (0) |
| 2018–2019 | San Jorge | 29 | (1) |
| 2019–2020 | Mitre | 8 | (0) |
| 2020– | Chaco For Ever | 136 | (6) |
- * Club domestic league appearances and goals as of 17:51, 24 April 2026 (UTC)

David Valdez (born 6 April 1993) is an Argentine professional footballer who plays as a midfielder for Chaco For Ever.

== Career ==
Valdez started with Atlético Tucumán in 2013, making his debut on 18 May in a Primera B Nacional match against Instituto. He went onto make twenty-eight further appearances during the next three Primera B Nacional campaigns, with the last of those three ending in promotion to the 2016 Argentine Primera División. Valdez joined Torneo Federal A side San Jorge in September 2018.

== Career statistics ==
As of 12 September 2018.

Club statistics
| Club | Season | League | | | Cup (Note: Includes the Copa Argentina.) | | League Cup | | Continental (Note: Includes the Copa Libertadores and Copa Sudamericana.) | | Other | | Total | |
| Club | Season | Division | Apps | Goals | Apps | Goals | Apps | Goals | Apps | Goals | Apps | Goals | Apps | Goals |
|---|---|---|---|---|---|---|---|---|---|---|---|---|---|---|
| Atlético Tucumán | 2012–13 | Primera B Nacional | 1 | 0 | 0 | 0 | — | | — | | 0 | 0 | 1 | 0 |
| Atlético Tucumán | 2013–14 | Primera B Nacional | 12 | 0 | 1 | 0 | — | | — | | 0 | 0 | 13 | 0 |
| Atlético Tucumán | 2014 | Primera B Nacional | 2 | 0 | 0 | 0 | — | | — | | 0 | 0 | 2 | 0 |
| Atlético Tucumán | 2015 | Primera B Nacional | 14 | 0 | 0 | 0 | — | | — | | 0 | 0 | 14 | 0 |
| Atlético Tucumán | 2016 | Primera División | 0 | 0 | 0 | 0 | — | | — | | 0 | 0 | 0 | 0 |
| Atlético Tucumán | 2016–17 | Primera División | 1 | 0 | 0 | 0 | — | | 0 | 0 | 0 | 0 | 1 | 0 |
| Atlético Tucumán | 2017–18 | Primera División | 3 | 0 | 0 | 0 | — | | 2 (Note: Two appearances in 2017 Copa Sudamericana) | 0 | 0 | 0 | 5 | 0 |
| Atlético Tucumán | Total | | 33 | 0 | 1 | 0 | — | | 2 | 0 | 0 | 0 | 36 | 0 |
| San Jorge | 2018–19 | Torneo Federal A | 1 | 0 | 0 | 0 | — | | — | | 0 | 0 | 1 | 0 |
| Career total | | | 34 | 0 | 1 | 0 | — | | 2 | 0 | 0 | 0 | 37 | 0 |

== Honours ==
Atlético Tucumán

- Primera B Nacional: 2015
