= Matías Moisés =

Argentine footballer (born 1987)

Personal information
- Full name: Álvaro Matías Moisés
- Date of birth: 3 June 1987 (age 39)
- Place of birth: Santiago del Estero, Argentina
- Height: 1.85 m (6 ft 1 in)
- Position: Centre-back

Youth career
- Escuela Luis Valoy
- 2001–2005: Rosario Central
- 2005–2008: River Plate

Senior career*
Years	Team	Apps	(Gls)
2008	Racing de Olavarría	11	(1)
2009	Santamarina	16	(0)
2009–2016	Boca Unidos	155	(2)
2016–2021	Mitre	89	(3)
- * Club domestic league appearances and goals as of 19:09, 17 August 2022 (UTC)

Álvaro Matías Moisés (born 3 June 1987) is an Argentine professional footballer who plays as a centre-back.

== Career ==
Moisés' youth career began with Escuela Luis Valoy, before joining Rosario Central in 2001 and River Plate in 2005. His senior career started in Torneo Argentino B with Racing de Olavarría, which preceded a 2009 move to Torneo Argentino A side Santamarina. He had made twenty-seven appearances and scored one goal across those two spells. 2009 saw Moisés join Boca Unidos of Primera B Nacional. He made his professional bow on 12 September against Olimpo, while his first goal arrived in February 2011 versus Patronato. In total, he netted twice in one hundred and fifty-nine games in eight seasons with Boca Unidos.

On 12 July 2016, Moisés moved to Torneo Federal A's Mitre. His first campaign ended with promotion, having featured twenty-seven times and netted once.

== Career statistics ==
As of 10 December 2018.

Club statistics
Club	Season	League			Cup (Note: Includes the Copa Argentina)		League Cup		Continental		Other		Total	
Club	Season	Division	Apps	Goals	Apps	Goals	Apps	Goals	Apps	Goals	Apps	Goals	Apps	Goals
Racing de Olavarría	2008–09	Torneo Argentino B	11	1	0	0	—		—		0	0	11	1
Santamarina	2008–09	Torneo Argentino A	16	0	0	0	—		—		0	0	16	0
Boca Unidos	2009–10	Primera B Nacional	16	0	0	0	—		—		0	0	16	0
Boca Unidos	2010–11	Primera B Nacional	15	1	0	0	—		—		0	0	15	1
Boca Unidos	2011–12	Primera B Nacional	17	0	0	0	—		—		0	0	17	0
Boca Unidos	2012–13	Primera B Nacional	32	0	3	0	—		—		0	0	35	0
Boca Unidos	2013–14	Primera B Nacional	36	0	0	0	—		—		0	0	36	0
Boca Unidos	2014	Primera B Nacional	16	1	0	0	—		—		0	0	16	1
Boca Unidos	2015	Primera B Nacional	17	0	1	0	—		—		0	0	18	0
Boca Unidos	2016	Primera B Nacional	6	0	0	0	—		—		0	0	6	0
Boca Unidos	Total		155	2	4	0	—		—		0	0	159	2
Mitre	2016–17	Torneo Federal A	21	1	0	0	—		—		6 (Note: Six appearances in the 2016–17 Torneo Federal A play-offs)	0	27	1
Mitre	2017–18	Primera B Nacional	24	0	0	0	—		—		0	0	24	0
Mitre	2018–19	Primera B Nacional	6	0	0	0	—		—		0	0	6	0
Mitre	Total		51	1	0	0	—		—		6	0	57	1
Career total			233	4	4	0	—		—		6	0	243	4
