= Nelson Benítez =

Argentine footballer (born 1984)

Personal information
- Full name: Nelson Fabián Benítez
- Date of birth: 24 May 1984 (age 42)
- Place of birth: Villa Huidobro, Argentina
- Height: 1.81 m (5 ft 11 in)
- Position: Left-back

Team information
- Current team: Ferro Carril Oeste

Senior career*
| Years | Team | Apps | (Gls) |
| 2002–2004 | Lanús | 32 | (2) |
| 2004–2005 | Talleres | 25 | (1) |
| 2006 | Gimnasia de Jujuy | 13 | (1) |
| 2006–2008 | Lanús | 35 | (1) |
| 2008–2011 | Porto | 5 | (0) |
| 2009 | → Leixões (loan) | 6 | (0) |
| 2009–2010 | → San Lorenzo (loan) | 19 | (2) |
| 2011–2013 | Estudiantes | 5 | (0) |
| 2013 | Talleres | 12 | (0) |
| 2013–2014 | Olimpia | 19 | (1) |
| 2014–2016 | Talleres | 27 | (0) |
| 2016–2017 | Atlético de Rafaela | 16 | (0) |
| 2017–2019 | Mitre | 13 | (2) |
| 2019– | Ferro Carril Oeste | 10 | (0) |
- * Club domestic league appearances and goals as of 20:42, 24 November 2019 (UTC)

Nelson Fabián Benítez (born 24 May 1984) is an Argentine football who plays as a left-back for Torneo Federal A side Ferro Carril Oeste.

== Career ==
Benítez made his breakthrough into Lanús' first team in 2002. Between 2004 and 2006, he spent time with Talleres and Gimnasia de Jujuy before returning to Lanús. In 2007, Benítez was part of the Lanús squad that won the first top flight championship in the club's history. In May 2008, Benítez agreed a four-year contract to play for Porto in the Primeira Liga. On 17 August 2009, Porto loaned the Argentine left-back to Leixões for a season. However, in October 2009, Benitez signed for Argentine club San Lorenzo, as replacement for the injured left-backs Aureliano Torres and Sebastián Luna.

In 2016, after spells with Estudiantes, Talleres (in 2013 & 2014) and Olimpia, Serrano joined Atletico Rafaela to play in the Argentine Primera División.

== Career statistics ==
As of 14 January 2017

Appearances and goals by club, season and competition
| Club | Season | League | | | National cup (Note: Includes the Copa Argentina.) | | League cup | | Continental (Note: Includes the Copa Libertadores and Copa Sudamericana) | | Other | | Total | |
| Club | Season | Division | Apps | Goals | Apps | Goals | Apps | Goals | Apps | Goals | Apps | Goals | Apps | Goals |
|---|---|---|---|---|---|---|---|---|---|---|---|---|---|---|
| Atlético de Rafaela | 2016 | Argentine Primera División | 15 | 0 | 1 | 0 | — | | — | | 0 | 0 | 16 | 0 |
| Atlético de Rafaela | 2016–17 | Argentine Primera División | 1 | 0 | 0 | 0 | — | | — | | 0 | 0 | 1 | 0 |
| Atlético de Rafaela | Total | | 16 | 0 | 1 | 0 | — | | — | | 0 | 0 | 17 | 0 |
| Career total | | | 16 | 0 | 1 | 0 | — | | — | | 0 | 0 | 17 | 0 |

== Honours ==
Lanús

- Argentine Primera División: 2007 Apertura

Porto

- Primeira Liga: 2008–09
- Taça de Portugal: 2008–09
