= Club Atlético Mitre =

Mitre (SdE)
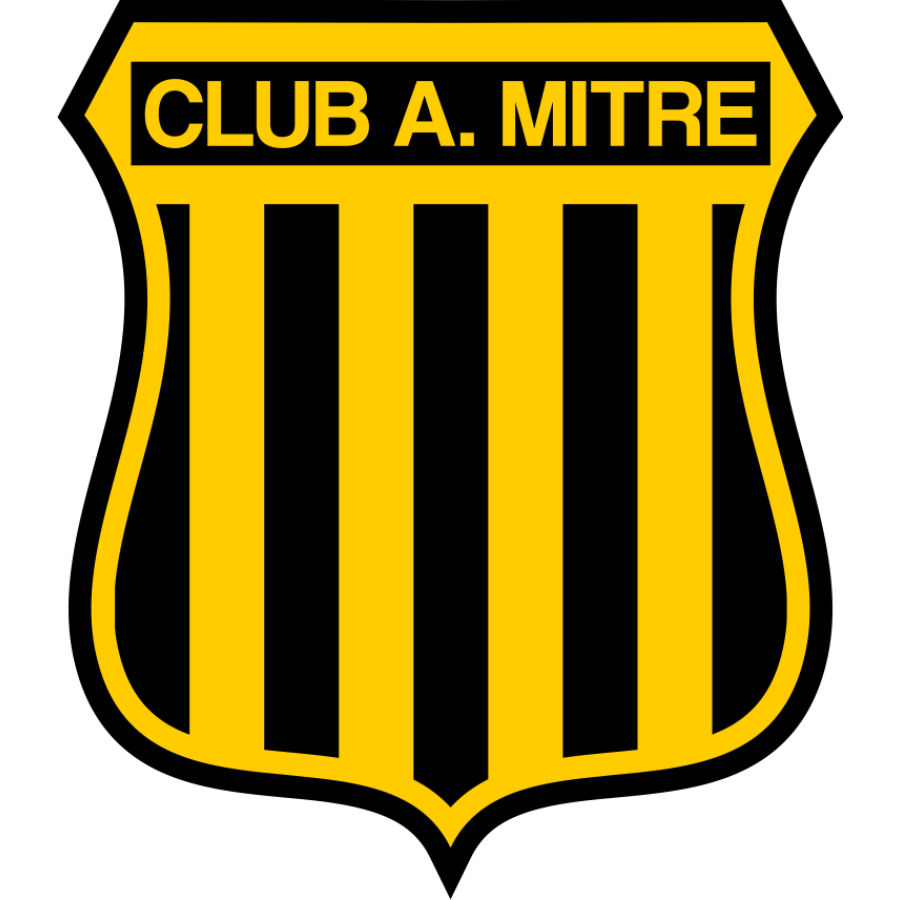
- Full name: Club Atlético Mitre
- Nicknames: Aurinegro; Tigre de la Roca; Decano santiagueño
- Founded: 2 April 1907; 119 years ago
- Ground: Doctores José y Antonio Castiglione
- Capacity: 21,000
- President: Guillermo Raed
- Manager: Gonzalo Salgueiro
- Coach: Carlos Mayor
- League: Primera Nacional
- 2025: Primera Nacional Zone B, 13th of 18
- Website: http://camitreweb.com.ar/
Home colours	Away colours	Third colours

Club Atlético Mitre is an Argentine sports club located in the Santiago del Estero. The club is mostly known for its football team, that currently plays in Primera B Nacional, the second division of Argentine football league system.

Other sports practised at the club are basketball, basque pelota, bowls, cestoball, and cycling.

== History ==
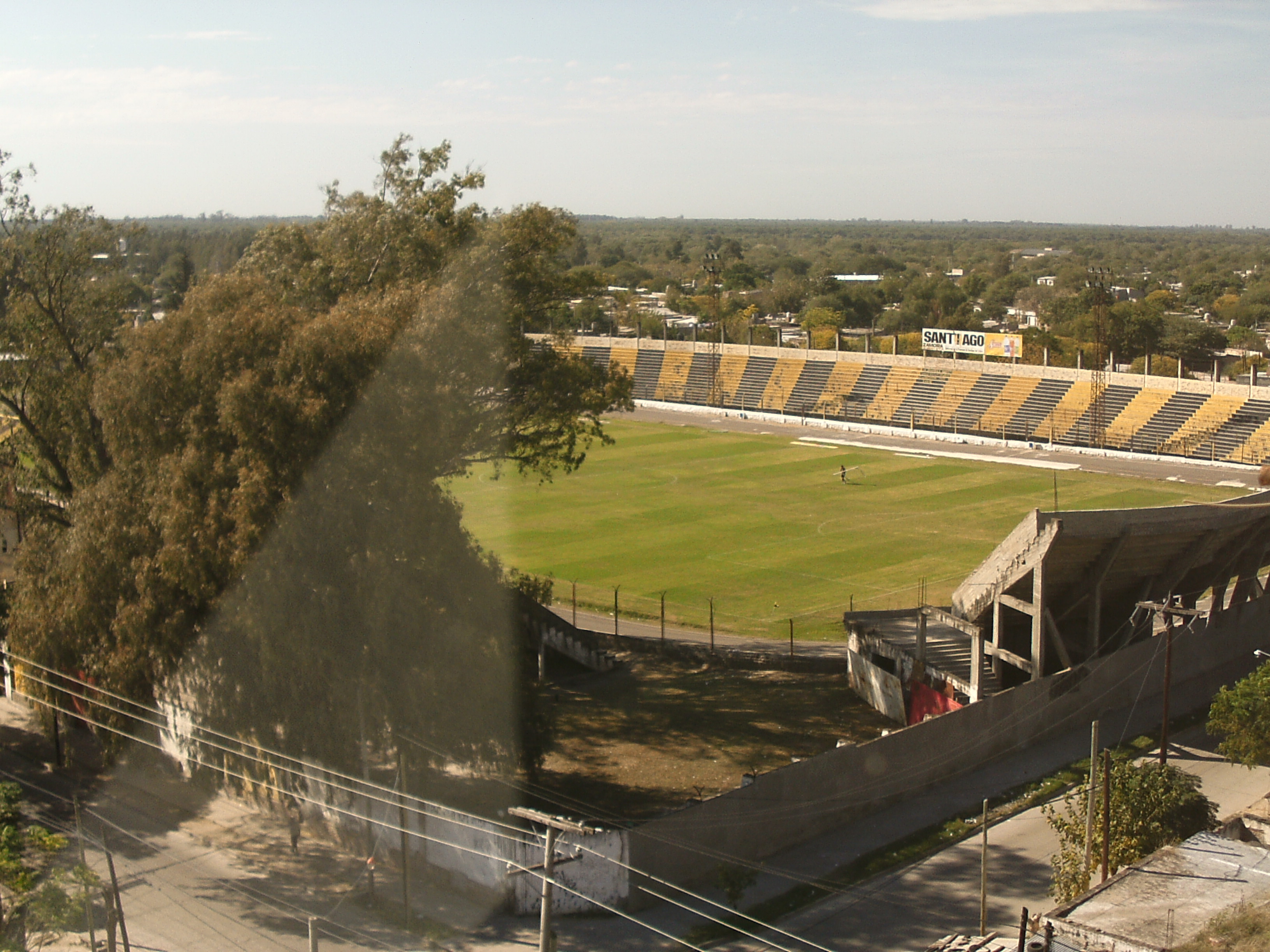
Mitre stadium, "Doctores José y Antonio Castiglione"

The club was founded on April 2, 1907 by Francisco Igounet, his daughter and his father-in-law. After a friendly football match between "Mendoza" and "Mitre" with the second team being the winner, the club was established naming it "Club Atlético Mitre" honoring former president of Argentina who had died a few years before. The institution choose the yellow and black colors inspired on Uruguayan club CURCC (today Peñarol).

One of the most notable Mitre's footballers, Segundo Luna, was part of the Argentina national team that won a silver medal at the 1928 Summer Olympics.

Mitre was the first team to achieve 6 consecutive titles in the Liga Santiagueña de Fútbol, the regional league of the province. The club has won a total of 31 local championships to date.

The squad also participated in the 1970 Copa Argentina and several Argentino A and Argentino B championships since 2002.

In 2017, Mitre promoted to Nacional B for its first time after defeating Gimnasia y Esgrima de Mendoza by 4–3 through penalty shoot-out in the playoffs final. The line-up for that match was: Alejandro Medina; Ricardo Tapia, Oscar Piris, Matías Moisés y Franco Ledesma; Facundo Juárez, Juan Ignacio Alessandroni, Leandro De Muner, Franco Ferrari; Joaquín Quinteros, David Romero. The team was managed by Arnaldo Sialle.

Mitre plays its home matches in the "Estadio Doctores Castiglione" situated in the "Barrio 8 de Abril" on Calle 3 de Febrero.

== Players ==
=== Current squad ===
As of 9 March 2026 Note: Flags indicate national team as defined under FIFA eligibility rules; some limited exceptions apply. Players may hold more than one non-FIFA nationality.

No.	Pos.	Nation	Player
—	GK	ARG	Ignacio Pietrobono
—	GK	ARG	Joaquín Ledesma
—	GK	ARG	Gastón Unrein
—	DF	URU	Tiago Ferreyra
—	DF	ARG	Maximiliano Romero
—	DF	ARG	Pablo Minissale (on loan from Argentinos Juniors)
—	DF	ARG	Daniel Abello
—	DF	ARG	Gianfranco Herdt
—	DF	ARG	Martín Vázquez
—	DF	ARG	Segundo Rodríguez
—	DF	ARG	Franco Ferrari
—	DF	ARG	Martín Rodríguez
—	DF	ARG	Luciano Correa
—	DF	ARG	Mateo Maldonado (on loan from Argentinos Juniors)
—	DF	ARG	Iván Antunes

No.	Pos.	Nation	Player
—	DF	ARG	Brian Mieres
—	MF	ARG	Juan Alessandroni (captain)
—	MF	ARG	Matías Ferrari
—	MF	ARG	Marcos Machado
—	MF	ARG	Mateo Montenegro
—	MF	ARG	Gonzalo Córdoba
—	MF	ARG	Alan López
—	FW	ARG	Santiago Rosales
—	FW	ARG	Agustín Ramírez
—	FW	ARG	Enzo Avaro
—	FW	ARG	Claudio Salto
—	FW	ARG	Rodrigo González
—	FW	ARG	Gustavo Fernández (on loan from Deportivo Riestra)
—	FW	ARG	Juan Pablo Zárate

=== Other players under contract ===
Note: Flags indicate national team as defined under FIFA eligibility rules; some limited exceptions apply. Players may hold more than one non-FIFA nationality.

No.	Pos.	Nation	Player
—	DF	ARG	Gonzalo Valdivia (injured)

=== Out on loan ===
Note: Flags indicate national team as defined under FIFA eligibility rules; some limited exceptions apply. Players may hold more than one non-FIFA nationality.

No.	Pos.	Nation	Player
—	GK	ARG	Luciano Jachfe (at Nueva Chicago until 31 December 2026)
—	DF	ARG	Nicolás Goitea (at Newell's Old Boys until 31 December 2026)
—	DF	ARG	Matías Godoy (at Unión Comercio until 31 December 2026)
—	FW	ARG	Favio Cabral (at Chacarita Juniors until 31 December 2026)
—	FW	ARG	José María Ingratti (at Deportivo Riestra until 31 December 2026)

== Titles ==
=== Regional ===
- Liga Santiagueña de Fútbol
  - Champions (30): 1913, 1916, 1917, Anual 1926, Torneo de Honor 1926, Anual 1927, Torneo de Honor 1927, Anual 1928, Torneo de Honor 1928, Anual 1932, Torneo de Honor 1932, Anual de 1936, Primera División 1989, Primera División 1990, Primera División 1994, Liguilla Representación 1997, Clausura 1998, Liguilla Representación 1998, Apertura 1999, Anual 2002, Liguilla Representación 2007, Clausura 2009, Anual 2009, Clausura 2014, Apertura 2015, Clausura 2015
