= 2019–20 Atlético Tucumán season =

Atlético Tucumán
2019–20 season
- President: Mario Leito
- Manager: Ricardo Zielinski
- Stadium: Estadio Monumental José Fierro
- Top goalscorer: League: Bruno Bianchi (1); Marcelo Ortiz; Javier Toledo; All: Bruno Bianchi (1); Marcelo Ortiz; Javier Toledo

The 2019–20 season is Atlético Tucumán's fifth consecutive season in the top division of Argentine football. In addition to the Primera División, the club are competing in the Copa Argentina, Copa de la Superliga and Copa Sudamericana.

The season generally covers the period from 1 July 2019 to 30 June 2020.

== Review ==
=== Pre-season ===
Cristian Erbes was announced as Atlético Tucumán's first off-season signing on 17 June 2019, as he agreed terms on a move from Nacional of the Paraguayan Primera División. He was followed on the same day by Fabián Monzón, who had been a free agent since leaving Universidad de Chile in mid-2018. José Luis Fernández (Defensa y Justicia) and Dylan Gissi (Patronato) also completed moves in on that day. Mathías Abero departed to Patronato on 19 June, with Juan Cruz Kaprof following him out as he joined Arsenal de Sarandí on 21 June. Their fifth reinforcement became Federico Bravo on 25 June, joining from Patronato. Rodrigo Aliendro was confirmed as their third outgoing player on 27 June, as the central midfielder moved to fellow Primera División outfit Colón.

Later on 27 June, a swap deal with Racing Club was made official as David Barbona switched places with Augusto Lotti and Yonathan Cabral; with Racing also paying $750k. Lotti penned a five-year contract, while Cabral made his loan permanent to sign a four-year deal. Ricardo Zielinski secured his eighth new player on 28 June by completing negotiations with Colón's Gustavo Toledo, which was later revealed to have been part of swap for Rodrigo Aliendro. Numerous loans from the previously campaign expired on 30 June. Franco Sbuttoni made a move to Arsenal de Sarandí on 1 July, while Juan Mercier went to San Martín in the following twenty-four hours. Leonardo Heredia signed on 3 July, coming from Plaza Colonia of the Uruguayan Primera División.

Marcelo Ortiz arrived from Boca Unidos on 6 July, as Claudio Pombo went to Sarmiento. They met Gimnasia y Esgrima (J) went undefeated in two matches on 11 July. On 12 July, Deportes Antofagasta captured Nery Leyes. They suffered losses on 16 July against Vélez Sarsfield. Mauro Osores was loaned by Primera B Nacional's Guillermo Brown on 19 July. Tucumán played Boca Juniors in consecutive friendlies on 18 July, losing by an aggregate of six goals. They again went winless in games with Banfield on 20 July. Ariel Rojas, from San Lorenzo, came on 22 July. Guillermo Acosta, after terminating his contract with Lanús, headed to Tucumán on 25 July; seven months after doing the opposite. Lucas Melano joined on 26 July, having left Portland Timbers on 16 July.

=== July ===
Atlético Tucumán hosted Rosario Central on day one of the 2019–20 Primera División, eventually falling to a 1–2 defeat after Leonardo Gil scored the visitor's winner. Gonzalo Castellani signed for Tucumán from San Lorenzo on 30 July. Gervasio Núñez headed off to newly-promoted Central Córdoba on 31 July.

=== August ===
Atlético Tucumán experienced consecutive defeats in the Primera División on 3 August, as Central Córdoba beat them at the Estadio Alfredo Terrera. Tucumán met Mitre in two friendlies on 8 August, as they both ended with one-goal wins; Gonzalo Castellani and Jonás Romero scored. After back-to-back games without a win to start the league campaign, Tucumán won their first three points on 19 August during a fixture with Godoy Cruz. A third loss in four matches arrived for Ricardo Zielinski's men on 26 August, as they lost 3–0 away to Aldosivi. José San Román departed to Cypriot football with Nea Salamina on 31 August.

=== September ===
Marcelo Ortiz netted in the Primera División against Arsenal de Sarandí on 1 September, which gave Tucumán their second straight home victory on 1 September. Tucumán went through to the round of sixteen in the Copa Argentina on 4 September, defeating Boca Unidos on penalties in the round of thirty-two.

== Squad ==
Squad No.	Nationality	Name	Position(s)	Date of Birth (age)	Signed from
Goalkeepers
1	Argentina	Cristian Lucchetti	GK	26 June 1978 (age 48)	Banfield
20	Argentina	Franco Pizzicanella	GK	29 May 1996 (age 30)	Academy
24	Argentina	Alejandro Sánchez	GK	25 October 1986 (age 40)	Nueva Chicago
Defenders
2	Argentina	Bruno Bianchi	CB	17 February 1989 (age 37)	Unión Santa Fe
3	Argentina	Fabián Monzón	LB	13 April 1987 (age 39)	Universidad de Chile
6	Argentina	Marcelo Ortiz	CB	13 January 1994 (age 32)	Boca Unidos (loan)
13	Argentina	Dylan Gissi	CB	27 April 1991 (age 35)	Patronato
14	Argentina	Agustín Lagos	DF	9 October 2001 (age 25)	Academy
15	Argentina	Yonathan Cabral	CB	10 May 1992 (age 34)	Racing Club
25	Argentina	Camilo Albornoz	DF	24 October 2000 (age 26)	Academy
26	Argentina	Gustavo Toledo	RB	19 September 1989 (age 37)	Colón
30	Argentina	Gabriel Risso Patrón	LB	5 November 1985 (age 41)	Academy
	Argentina	Pier Barrios	CB	1 July 1990 (age 36)	Belgrano
	Uruguay	Andrés Lamas	CB	16 January 1984 (age 42)	Defensor Sporting
Midfielders
5	Argentina	Federico Bravo	CM	5 October 1993 (age 33)	Patronato
7	Argentina	Tomás Cuello	LM	5 March 2000 (age 26)	Academy
8	Argentina	Guillermo Acosta	CM	31 October 1988 (age 38)	Lanús
10	Argentina	Gonzalo Castellani	AM	10 August 1987 (age 39)	San Lorenzo
11	Argentina	José Luis Fernández	LM	26 October 1987 (age 39)	Defensa y Justicia
16	Argentina	Ariel Rojas	LM	16 January 1986 (age 40)	San Lorenzo
17	Argentina	Leonardo Heredia	AM	11 January 1996 (age 30)	Plaza Colonia
21	Argentina	Cristian Erbes	CM	6 January 1990 (age 36)	Nacional
23	Argentina	Ramiro Carrera	RM	24 October 1993 (age 33)	Unión Española
Forwards
9	Argentina	Leandro Díaz	CF	6 June 1992 (age 34)	Veracruz
12	Argentina	Lucas Melano	CF	1 March 1993 (age 33)	Portland Timbers
18	Argentina	Ramiro Ruiz	FW	21 March 2000 (age 26)	Academy
22	Argentina	Javier Toledo	CF	20 April 1986 (age 40)	Sol de América
27	Argentina	Augusto Lotti	CF	10 June 1996 (age 30)	Racing Club
28	Argentina	Jonás Romero	RW	21 August 2000 (age 26)	Academy
29	Argentina	Kevin Isa Luna	FW	18 April 2001 (age 25)	Academy
	Argentina	Mauro Matos	CF	6 August 1982 (age 44)	Chacarita Juniors
Out on loan					Loaned to
	Argentina	Favio Álvarez	AM	23 January 1993 (age 33)	LA Galaxy
	Argentina	Mauro Osores	CB	20 February 1997 (age 29)	Guillermo Brown

== Transfers ==
Domestic transfer windows:
3 July 2019 to 24 September 2019
20 January 2020 to 19 February 2020.

=== Transfers in ===
Date from	Position	Nationality	Name	From	Ref.
3 July 2019 (Note: Deal agreed on 17 June 2019)	CM	Argentina	Cristian Erbes	Nacional	
3 July 2019 (Note: Deal agreed on 17 June 2019)	LB	Argentina	Fabián Monzón	Unattached (Note: Previously played for Universidad de Chile (2016–2018).)	
3 July 2019 (Note: Deal agreed on 17 June 2019)	LM	Argentina	José Luis Fernández	Defensa y Justicia	
3 July 2019 (Note: Deal agreed on 17 June 2019)	CB	Switzerland	Dylan Gissi	Patronato	
3 July 2019 (Note: Deal agreed on 25 June 2019)	CM	Argentina	Federico Bravo	Patronato	
3 July 2019 (Note: Deal agreed on 27 June 2019)	CF	Argentina	Augusto Lotti	Racing Club	
3 July 2019 (Note: Deal agreed on 27 June 2019)	CB	Argentina	Yonathan Cabral	Racing Club	
3 July 2019 (Note: Deal agreed on 28 June 2019)	RB	Argentina	Gustavo Toledo	Colón	
3 July 2019	AM	Argentina	Leonardo Heredia	Plaza Colonia	
22 July 2019	LM	Argentina	Ariel Rojas	San Lorenzo	
25 July 2019	CM	Argentina	Guillermo Acosta	Lanús	
26 July 2019	CF	Argentina	Lucas Melano	Portland Timbers (Note: Released by Portland Timbers on 16 July.)	
30 July 2019	AM	Argentina	Gonzalo Castellani	San Lorenzo	

=== Transfers out ===
Date from	Position	Nationality	Name	To	Ref.
3 July 2019 (Note: Deal agreed on 19 June 2019)	LB	Uruguay	Mathías Abero	Patronato	
3 July 2019 (Note: Deal agreed on 21 June 2019)	RW	Argentina	Juan Cruz Kaprof	Arsenal de Sarandí	
3 July 2019 (Note: Deal agreed on 27 June 2019)	CM	Argentina	Rodrigo Aliendro	Colón	
3 July 2019 (Note: Deal agreed on 27 June 2019)	AM	Argentina	David Barbona	Racing Club	
3 July 2019 (Note: Deal agreed on 1 July 2019)	CB	Argentina	Franco Sbuttoni	Arsenal de Sarandí	
3 July 2019 (Note: Deal agreed on 2 July 2019)	CM	Argentina	Juan Mercier	San Martín	
6 July 2019	RM	Argentina	Claudio Pombo	Sarmiento	
23 July 2019 (Note: Deal agreed on 12 July 2019)	CM	Argentina	Nery Leyes	Deportes Antofagasta	
31 July 2019	LM	Argentina	Gervasio Núñez	Central Córdoba	
31 August 2019	RB	Argentina	José San Román	Nea Salamina	

=== Loans in ===
Start date	Position	Nationality	Name	From	End date	Ref.
6 July 2019	CB	Argentina	Marcelo Ortiz	Boca Unidos	30 June 2020	

=== Loans out ===
Start date	Position	Nationality	Name	To	End date	Ref.
19 July 2019	CB	Argentina	Mauro Osores	Guillermo Brown	30 June 2020	

== Friendlies ==
=== Pre-season ===
Banfield revealed, on 19 June, a friendly match with Atlético Tucumán was to take place in pre-season. Further fixtures, against Vélez Sarsfield and Defensa y Justicia, were released by the club on 24 June. A match with San Salvador de Jujuy's Gimnasia y Esgrima was scheduled on 4 July. Exact details for the Vélez Sarsfield and Banfield games were communicated on 8 July, as an encounter with Boca Juniors was also added; with all matches taking place in Buenos Aires.

Win Draw Loss

11 July 2019 Friendly	Gimnasia y Esgrima (J)	0–0	Atlético Tucumán	Salta, Argentina
		Atlético Tucumán; El Tucumano; 70 min. match		Stadium: Hotel de La Liga Salta; Referee: Federico Benítez (Argentina)

11 July 2019 Friendly	Gimnasia y Esgrima (J)	0–2	Atlético Tucumán	Salta, Argentina
		Atlético Tucumán; El Tucumano; 70 min. match	R. Rodríguez; E. Cabellos (o.g.)	Stadium: Hotel de La Liga Salta; Referee: Federico Benítez (Argentina)

16 July 2019 Friendly	Vélez Sarsfield	1–0	Atlético Tucumán	Ituzaingó, Argentina
	M. Romero	Atlético Tucumán; Olé		Stadium: Villa Olímpica

16 July 2019 Friendly	Vélez Sarsfield	1–0	Atlético Tucumán	Ituzaingó, Argentina
	L. Fernández	Atlético Tucumán; Olé		Stadium: Villa Olímpica

18 July 2019 Friendly	Boca Juniors	4–0	Atlético Tucumán	Ezeiza, Argentina
	A. Obando; C. Tevez	Atlético Tucumán; ESPN; 60 min. match		Stadium: Predio Entrenamiento Boca Juniors

18 July 2019 Friendly	Boca Juniors	2–0	Atlético Tucumán	Ezeiza, Argentina
	A. Mac Allister; S. Villa	Atlético Tucumán; ESPN; 60 min. match		Stadium: Predio Entrenamiento Boca Juniors

20 July 2019 Friendly	Banfield	1–0	Atlético Tucumán	Banfield, Argentina
	A. Fontana	Banfield; Olé; 80 min. match		Stadium: Estadio Florencio Sola

20 July 2019 Friendly	Banfield	2–2	Atlético Tucumán	Banfield, Argentina
	M. Ortiz; R. Lenis	Banfield; Olé; 80 min. match	J. Carranza; T. Cuello	Stadium: Estadio Florencio Sola

Friendly	Atlético Tucumán	Cancelled	Defensa y Justicia	Argentina

=== Mid-season ===
Mitre announced friendlies with Atlético Tucumán on 6 August.

Win Draw Loss

8 August 2019 Friendly	Atlético Tucumán	1–0	Mitre	San Miguel de Tucumán, Argentina
	G. Castellani	Atlético Tucumán; Nuevo Diario		Stadium: Estadio Monumental José Fierro

8 August 2019 Friendly	Atlético Tucumán	1–0	Mitre	San Miguel de Tucumán, Argentina
	J. Romero	Nuevo Diario		Stadium: Estadio Monumental José Fierro

== Competitions ==
=== Primera División ===
==== League table ====
Pos	Team	Pld	W	D	L	GF	GA	GD	Pts
13	Estudiantes (LP)	23	8	6	9	23	22	+1	30
14	Independiente	23	8	5	10	27	25	+2	29
15	Atlético Tucumán	23	7	8	8	22	25	−3	29
16	Unión	23	7	6	10	21	30	−9	27
17	Banfield	23	6	8	9	19	23	−4	26

Source: AFA
Rules for classification: 1) points; 2) play-off (only if needed to decide championship); 3) goal difference; 4) goals scored; 5) head-to-head points; 6) head-to-head goal difference; 7) head-to-head goals scored.

==== Relegation table ====
Pos	Team	2017–18 Pts	2018–19 Pts	2019–20 Pts	Total Pts	Total Pld	Avg	Relegation
10	San Lorenzo	50	23	13	86	57	1.509	
11	Vélez Sarsfield	38	40	7	85	57	1.491	
12	Atlético Tucumán	36	42	6	84	57	1.474	
13	Unión	43	36	4	83	57	1.456	
14	Lanús	29	34	10	73	57	1.281	

Source: AFA

==== Results summary ====
Overall								Home						Away					
Pld	W	D	L	GF	GA	GD	Pts	W	D	L	GF	GA	GD	W	D	L	GF	GA	GD
5	2	0	3	3	6	−3	6	2	0	1	3	2	+1	0	0	2	0	4	−4

Last updated: 1 September 2019.
Source: Soccerway

==== Matches ====
The fixtures for the 2019–20 campaign were released on 10 July.

Win Draw Loss

29 July 2019 1	Atlético Tucumán	1–2	Rosario Central	San Miguel de Tucumán, Argentina
21:10 GMT-3	N. Molina 55' (o.g.)	Atlético Tucumán; Infobae; Soccerway	C. Rius 27'; L. Gil 66'	Stadium: Estadio Monumental José Fierro; Referee: Néstor Pitana (Argentina)

3 August 2019 2	Central Córdoba	1–0	Atlético Tucumán	Santiago del Estero, Argentina
17:45 GMT-3	N. Femia 3'	Atlético Tucumán; Infobae; Soccerway		Stadium: Estadio Alfredo Terrera; Referee: Pablo Echavarría (Argentina)

19 August 2019 3	Atlético Tucumán	1–0	Godoy Cruz	San Miguel de Tucumán, Argentina
15:30 GMT-3	B. Bianchi 87'	Atlético Tucumán; Infobae; Soccerway		Stadium: Estadio Monumental José Fierro; Referee: Darío Herrera (Argentina)

26 August 2019 4	Aldosivi	3–0	Atlético Tucumán	Mar del Plata, Argentina
19:00 GMT-3	G. Acosta 59' (o.g.); N. Solís 66'; A. Ruiz 90+4' (pen.)	Atlético Tucumán; Infobae; Soccerway		Stadium: Estadio José María Minella; Referee: Silvio Trucco (Argentina)

1 September 2019 5	Atlético Tucumán	1–0	Arsenal de Sarandí	San Miguel de Tucumán, Argentina
11:00 GMT-3	M. Ortiz 20'	Atlético Tucumán; Infobae; Soccerway		Stadium: Estadio Monumental José Fierro; Referee: Ariel Penel (Argentina)

6	Vélez Sarsfield	–	Atlético Tucumán	Buenos Aires, Argentina
				Stadium: José Amalfitani Stadium

=== Copa Argentina ===
Atlético Tucumán were drawn to face Boca Unidos (Torneo Federal A) in the Copa Argentina round of thirty-two, with the match set for the Estadio Padre Ernesto Martearena in Salta. After progressing, they'd met league rivals Colón.

Win Draw Loss

4 September 2019 R32	Atlético Tucumán	2–2 (5–4 p)	Boca Unidos	Salta, Argentina
21:10 GMT-3	R. Huth 57' (o.g.); J. Toledo 60'	Atlético Tucumán; Infobae; Soccerway	A. Medina 73' (pen.); C. Núñez 83'	Stadium: Estadio Padre Ernesto Martearena; Referee: Jorge Baliño (Argentina)
	Penalties
	J. Toledo (penalty scored); G. Acosta (penalty scored); D. Gissi (penalty scored); L. Heredia (penalty scored); G. Castellani (penalty missed); F. Bravo (penalty scored)		L. Baroni (penalty scored); M. Ojeda (penalty scored); A. Morales (penalty scored); J. Vizcarra (penalty missed); A. Medina (penalty scored); F. Alloco (penalty missed)

10 September 2019 R16	Colón	–	Atlético Tucumán	Paraná, Argentina
19:10 GMT-3				Stadium: Estadio Presbítero Bartolomé Grella

=== Copa de la Superliga ===
Win Draw Loss

	–
00:00 GMT-3

=== Copa Sudamericana ===
Win Draw Loss

	–
00:00 GMT-3

== Squad statistics ==
=== Appearances and goals ===
No.	Pos.	Nationality	Name	League		Cup		League Cup		Continental		Total		Discipline		Ref
No.	Pos.	Nationality	Name	Apps	Goals	Apps	Goals	Apps	Goals	Apps	Goals	Apps	Goals	Yellow card	Red card	Ref
1	GK	Argentina	Cristian Lucchetti	4	0	0	0	0	0	0	0	4	0	1	0	
2	CB	Argentina	Bruno Bianchi	5	1	0	0	0	0	0	0	5	1	2	0	
3	LB	Argentina	Fabián Monzón	4	0	0	0	0	0	0	0	4	0	0	0	
5	CM	Argentina	Federico Bravo	3	0	1	0	0	0	0	0	4	0	1	0	
6	CB	Argentina	Marcelo Ortiz	4	1	1	0	0	0	0	0	5	1	1	0	
7	LM	Argentina	Tomás Cuello	3	0	0	0	0	0	0	0	3	0	0	0	
8	CM	Argentina	Guillermo Acosta	4(1)	0	0(1)	0	0	0	0	0	4(2)	0	0	0	
9	CF	Argentina	Leandro Díaz	5	0	0	0	0	0	0	0	5	0	2	0	
10	AM	Argentina	Gonzalo Castellani	4	0	0(1)	0	0	0	0	0	4(1)	0	0	0	
11	LM	Argentina	José Luis Fernández	2(1)	0	1	0	0	0	0	0	3(1)	0	1	0	
12	CF	Argentina	Lucas Melano	0(5)	0	1	0	0	0	0	0	1(5)	0	1	0	
13	CB	Switzerland	Dylan Gissi	2	0	1	0	0	0	0	0	3	0	0	0	
14	DF	Argentina	Agustín Lagos	0	0	0	0	0	0	0	0	0	0	0	0	
15	CB	Argentina	Yonathan Cabral	2	0	1	0	0	0	0	0	3	0	0	0	
16	LM	Argentina	Ariel Rojas	4(1)	0	1	0	0	0	0	0	5(1)	0	1	0	
17	AM	Argentina	Leonardo Heredia	0	0	0(1)	0	0	0	0	0	0(1)	0	0	0	
18	FW	Argentina	Ramiro Ruiz	0	0	0	0	0	0	0	0	0	0	0	0	
20	GK	Argentina	Franco Pizzicanella	0	0	0	0	0	0	0	0	0	0	0	0	
21	CM	Argentina	Cristian Erbes	2	0	0	0	0	0	0	0	2	0	0	0	
22	CF	Argentina	Javier Toledo	3(2)	0	1	1	0	0	0	0	4(2)	1	4	1	
23	RM	Argentina	Ramiro Carrera	1(2)	0	1	0	0	0	0	0	2(2)	0	0	0	
24	GK	Argentina	Alejandro Sánchez	1(1)	0	1	0	0	0	0	0	2(1)	0	0	0	
25	DF	Argentina	Camilo Albornoz	0	0	0	0	0	0	0	0	0	0	0	0	
26	RB	Argentina	Gustavo Toledo	0	0	0	0	0	0	0	0	0	0	0	0	
27	CF	Argentina	Augusto Lotti	2(1)	0	1	0	0	0	0	0	3(1)	0	0	0	
28	RW	Argentina	Jonás Romero	0	0	0	0	0	0	0	0	0	0	0	0	
29	FW	Argentina	Kevin Isa Luna	0	0	0	0	0	0	0	0	0	0	0	0	
30	LB	Argentina	Gabriel Risso Patrón	0(1)	0	0	0	0	0	0	0	0(1)	0	0	0	
–	AM	Argentina	Favio Álvarez	0	0	0	0	0	0	0	0	0	0	0	0	
–	CB	Argentina	Pier Barrios	0	0	0	0	0	0	0	0	0	0	0	0	
–	CB	Uruguay	Andrés Lamas	0	0	0	0	0	0	0	0	0	0	0	0	
–	CF	Argentina	Mauro Matos	0	0	0	0	0	0	0	0	0	0	0	0	
–	CB	Argentina	Mauro Osores	0	0	0	0	0	0	0	0	0	0	0	0	
Own goals				—	0	—	0	—	0	—	0	—	0	—	—	—
Players who left during the season
–	RB	Argentina	José San Román	0	0	0	0	0	0	0	0	0	0	0	0	

Statistics accurate as of 5 September 2019.

=== Goalscorers ===
Rank	Pos	No.	Nat	Name	League	Cup	League Cup	Continental	Total	Ref
1	CB	2	Argentina	Bruno Bianchi	1	0	0	0	1	
1	CB	6	Argentina	Marcelo Ortiz	1	0	0	0	1	
1	CF	22	Argentina	Javier Toledo	1	0	0	0	1	
Own goals					2	0	0	0	2	
Totals					5	0	0	0	5	—
