= 2018–19 Copa Argentina =

Tournament details
- Country: Argentina
- Dates: 16 January–13 December 2019
- Teams: 87

Final positions
- Champions: River Plate (3rd title)
- Runners-up: Central Córdoba (SdE)
- 2020 Copa Libertadores: River Plate

Tournament statistics
- Matches played: 109
- Goals scored: 244 (2.24 per match)
- Top goal scorer: Cristian Duma (4 goals)

Awards
- Best player: Ignacio Fernández

The 2018–19 Copa Argentina (officially the Copa Total Argentina 2018–19 for sponsorship reasons) was the tenth edition of the Copa Argentina, and the eighth since the relaunch of the tournament in 2011. The competition began on 16 January 2019 and ended on 13 December 2019.

River Plate defeated Central Córdoba (SdE) in the final to win their third title. As champions, they qualified for the 2020 Copa Libertadores group stage and the 2019 Supercopa Argentina.

Rosario Central, the defending champions, were eliminated by Sol de Mayo in the Round of 64.

== Teams ==
The 87 teams that took part in this competition were: all twenty-six teams from the Primera División; twelve teams of the Primera B Nacional; six from the Primera B, four from the Primera C; three from the Primera D and all thirty-six teams from Federal A.

=== First Level ===
==== Primera División ====
All twenty-six teams qualified.

- Aldosivi
- Argentinos Juniors
- Atlético Tucumán
- Banfield
- Belgrano
- Boca Juniors
- Colón
- Defensa y Justicia
- Estudiantes (LP)
- Gimnasia y Esgrima (LP)
- Godoy Cruz
- Huracán
- Independiente
- Lanús
- Newell's Old Boys
- Patronato
- Racing
- River Plate
- Rosario Central^{TH}
- San Lorenzo
- San Martín (SJ)
- San Martín (T)
- Talleres (C)
- Tigre
- Unión
- Vélez Sarsfield

=== Second Level ===
==== Primera B Nacional ====
The best twelve teams at the 13th round of 2018–19 tournament qualified.

- Agropecuario Argentino
- Almagro
- Arsenal
- Atlético de Rafaela
- Central Córdoba (SdE)
- Gimnasia y Esgrima (M)
- Independiente Rivadavia
- Mitre (SdE)
- Nueva Chicago
- Platense
- Sarmiento (J)
- Villa Dálmine

=== Third Level ===
==== Primera B Metropolitana ====
The top-six teams at the 19th round of 2018–19 Primera B tournament qualified.

- Acassuso
- All Boys
- Atlanta
- Barracas Central
- Deportivo Riestra
- Estudiantes (BA)

==== Torneo Federal A ====
All teams of the 2018–19 tournament qualified.

- Altos Hornos Zapla
- Alvarado
- Atlético Paraná
- Boca Unidos
- Chaco For Ever
- Cipolletti
- Crucero del Norte
- Defensores (P)
- Defensores de Belgrano (VR)
- Deportivo Camioneros
- Deportivo Madryn
- Deportivo Maipú
- Deportivo Roca
- Desamparados
- Douglas Haig
- Estudiantes (RC)
- Estudiantes (SL)
- Ferro Carril Oeste (GP)
- Gimnasia y Esgrima (CdU)
- Gimnasia y Tiro
- Huracán Las Heras
- Independiente (N)
- Juventud Antoniana
- Juventud Unida (G)
- Juventud Unida Universitario
- Racing (C)
- San Jorge (T)
- San Lorenzo (A)
- San Martín (F)
- Sansinena
- Sarmiento (R)
- Sol de Mayo
- Sportivo Belgrano
- Sportivo Las Parejas
- Unión (S)
- Villa Mitre

=== Fourth Level ===
==== Primera C Metropolitana ====
The top-four teams at the 19th round of 2018–19 Primera C tournament qualified.

- Deportivo Armenio
- Dock Sud
- Laferrere
- Midland

=== Fifth Level ===
==== Primera D Metropolitana ====
The top-three teams at the 15th round of 2018–19 Primera D tournament qualified.

- Argentino (M)
- Atlas
- Real Pilar

== Round and draw dates ==
Phase	Round	Draw date	First leg	Second leg
Regional Round	Round I	14 December 2018	16–17 January 2019	20 January 2019
Regional Round	Round II	14 December 2018	20–24 January 2019	27–28 January 2019
Final Stage	Round of 64	31 January 2019	26 February–21 July 2019	
Final Stage	Round of 32	31 January 2019	14 July–19 September 2019	
Final Stage	Round of 16	31 January 2019	7 September–10 October 2019	
Final Stage	Quarterfinals	31 January 2019	11–25 October 2019	
Final Stage	Semifinals	31 January 2019	14 November 2019	
Final Stage	Final	31 January 2019	13 December 2019	

== Regional Round ==
This round was organized by the Consejo Federal.

=== Round I ===
In the Round I, 20 teams from Torneo Federal A participated. The round was played between 16 and 20 January, on a home-and-away two-legged tie. The 10 winning teams advanced to the Round II.

Team 1	Agg.	Team 2	1st leg	2nd leg
Independiente (N)	0–3	Deportivo Madryn	0–0	0–3
Deportivo Roca	5–1	Cipolletti	3–1	2–0
Douglas Haig	8–4	Ferro Carril Oeste (GP)	6–3	2–1
Defensores (P)	1–3	Juventud Unida (G)	1–0	0–3
Atlético Paraná	2–1	Sportivo Las Parejas	1–0	1–1
Racing (C)	2–2 (a)	Sportivo Belgrano	2–1	0–1
Juventud Unida Universitario	3–5	Estudiantes (SL)	1–3	2–2
Altos Hornos Zapla	3–3 (3–2 p)	San Lorenzo (A)	1–2	2–1
San Martín (F)	2–4	Crucero del Norte	1–1	1–3
Juventud Antoniana	1–2	Gimnasia y Tiro	1–1	0–1

==== First leg ====
January 16, 2019	Independiente (N)	0–0	Deportivo Madryn	Neuquén, Pcia. de Neuquén
21:30		Report		Stadium: General San Martín; Referee: Fernando Omar Marcos

January 16, 2019	Deportivo Roca	3–1	Cipolletti	General Roca, Pcia. de Río Negro
21:30	Ostapkiewicz 48'; Garavano 71'; Aguirre 86'	Report	D. Romero 61'	Stadium: Luis Maiolino; Referee: Luciano Julio

January 16, 2019	Douglas Haig	6–3	Ferro Carril Oeste (GP)	Pergamino, Pcia. de Buenos Aires
21:30	Duma 27', 75' (pen.), 78'; Zaninovic 44'; Arismendi 83'; Berdini 84'	Report	Vasilchik 30'; De Hoyos 35' (pen.); González Hernández 55'	Stadium: Miguel Morales; Referee: Nahuel Viñas

January 16, 2019	Defensores (P)	1–0	Juventud Unida (G)	Pronunciamiento, Pcia. de Entre Ríos
21:00	Giménez 52' (o.g.)	Report		Stadium: Delio Esteban Cardozo; Referee: Jonathan Correa

January 16, 2019	Atlético Paraná	1–0	Sportivo Las Parejas	Paraná, Pcia. de Entre Rios
21:00	Lencioni 77'	Report		Stadium: Pedro Mutio; Referee: Adrián Franklin

January 16, 2019	Racing (C)	2–1	Sportivo Belgrano	Córdoba, Pcia. de Córdoba
21:30	Herrera 10'; Olocco 47'	Report	Avaro 61'	Stadium: Miguel Sancho; Referee: Carlos Córdoba

January 17, 2019	Juventud Unida Universitario	1–3	Estudiantes (SL)	San Luis, Pcia. de San Luis
21:30	Romero 88'	Report	Distaulo 35'; Amieva 72'; Cuello 82'	Stadium: Mario Sebastián Diez; Referee: César Ceballos

January 16, 2019	Altos Hornos Zapla	1–2	San Lorenzo (A)	Palpalá, Pcia. de Jujuy
21:30	Fernández 51'	Report	Moreno 27'; Wagner 63'	Stadium: Emilio Fabrizzi; Referee: Federico Guaymás Tornero

January 16, 2019	San Martín (F)	1–1	Crucero del Norte	Formosa, Pcia. de Formosa
17:30	Paniagua 65'	Report	Portillo 58'	Stadium: 17 de Octubre; Referee: Jorge Nelson Sosa

January 16, 2019	Juventud Antoniana	1–1	Gimnasia y Tiro	Salta, Pcia. de Salta
22:00	Cachi 59'	Report	F. Giménez 85' (pen.)	Stadium: Padre Ernesto Martearena; Referee: Carlos Gariano

==== Second leg ====
January 20, 2019	Deportivo Madryn	3–0 (3–0 agg.)	Independiente (N)	Puerto Madryn, Pcia. de Chubut
18:00	Clemente 42' (o.g.); Penna 53'; Mc Coubrey 60'	Report		Stadium: Abel Sastre; Referee: Sergio Testa

January 20, 2019	Cipolletti	0–2 (1–5 agg.)	Deportivo Roca	Cipolletti, Pcia. de Río Negro
21:30		Report	Ostapkiewicz 56'; Hurtado 77'	Stadium: La Visera de Cemento; Referee: Fernando Omar Marcos

January 20, 2019	Ferro Carril Oeste (GP)	1–2 (4–8 agg.)	Douglas Haig	General Pico, Pcia. de La Pampa
20:30	De Hoyos 60'	Report	López 29' (pen.); Soto 83'	Stadium: El Coloso de Barrio Talleres; Referee: Esteban Nasier

January 20, 2019	Juventud Unida (G)	3–0 (3–1 agg.)	Defensores (P)	Gualeguaychú, Pcia. de Entre Rios
20:30	Piaggio 39'; Fiorotto 57'; De León 70' (pen.)	Report		Stadium: De Los Eucaliptos; Referee: Maximiliano Macheroni

January 20, 2019	Sportivo Las Parejas	1–1 (1–2 agg.)	Atlético Paraná	Las Parejas, Pcia. de Santa Fe
21:00	Ayala 56'	Report	Spinelli 47'	Stadium: La Fortaleza del Lobo; Referee: Carlos Gariano

January 20, 2019	Sportivo Belgrano	1–0 (2–2 agg.)	Racing (C)	San Francisco, Pcia. de Córdoba
20:45	Catube 37'	Report		Stadium: Oscar C. Boero; Referee: Nahuel Viñas

January 20, 2019	Estudiantes (SL)	2–2 (5–3 agg.)	Juventud Unida Universitario	La Punta, Pcia. de San Luis
20:00	Díaz 26'; Distaulo 69'	Report	Abraham 48'; Figueroa 87'	Stadium: Provincial Juan Gilberto Funes; Referee: Alejandro Arco

January 20, 2019	San Lorenzo (A)	1–2 (3–3 agg.) (2–3 p)	Altos Hornos Zapla	San Fernando del Valle de Catamarca, Pcia. de Catamarca
17:30	Seco 38'	Report	Fernández 13', 45'	Stadium: Malvinas Argentinas; Referee: Emilio Maguna
	Penalties
	Peralta (penalty scored); Rivero (penalty missed); Wagner (penalty missed); Flores (penalty scored); Solohaga (penalty missed)		(penalty scored) Robles; (penalty missed) Navalón; (penalty scored) Fernández; (penalty scored) Noriega; (penalty missed) Casarino

January 20, 2019	Crucero del Norte	3–1 (4–2 agg.)	San Martín (F)	Garupá, Pcia. de Misiones
18:30	Siergiejuk 23'; Diana 36'; Marinucci 62'	Report	Velázquez 32'	Stadium: Comandante Andrés Guacurarí; Referee: Guillermo González

January 20, 2019	Gimnasia y Tiro	1–0 (2–1 agg.)	Juventud Antoniana	Salta, Pcia. de Salta
19:00	Cazula 63'	Report		Stadium: Gigante del Norte; Referee: Federico Guaymás Tornero

=== Round II ===
In the Round II, 10 qualified teams from the Round I and the remaining 16 teams from Torneo Federal A participated. The round was played between 20 and 28 January, on a home-and-away two-legged tie with best team in the Torneo Federal A hosting the second leg. The 13 winning teams advanced to the Final Round.

Team 1	Agg.	Team 2	1st leg	2nd leg
Deportivo Madryn	2–3	Sol de Mayo	2–1	0–2
Deportivo Roca	2–2 (a)	Alvarado	1–0	1–2
Douglas Haig	1–0	Deportivo Camioneros	1–0	0–0
Juventud Unida (G)	0–0 (5–4 p)	Gimnasia y Esgrima (CdU)	0–0	0–0
Atlético Paraná	1–1 (a)	Defensores de Belgrano (VR)	1–1	0–0
Sportivo Belgrano	1–4	Estudiantes (RC)	1–0	0–4
Estudiantes (SL)	2–2 (a)	Desamparados	1–0	1–2
Altos Hornos Zapla	1–1 (3–4 p)	Gimnasia y Tiro	1–0	0–1
Crucero del Norte	1–3	Boca Unidos	1–2	0–1
Sansinena	1–4	Villa Mitre	1–1	0–3
Sarmiento (R)	2–1	Chaco For Ever	2–1	0–0
Deportivo Maipú	3–3 (3–4 p)	Huracán Las Heras	2–1	1–2
San Jorge (T)	5–5 (a)	Unión (S)	3–3	2–2

==== First leg ====
January 23, 2019	Deportivo Madryn	2–1	Sol de Mayo	Puerto Madryn, Pcia. de Chubut
18:00	Elgorriaga 9'; Gaitán 84'	Report	H. Morales 82'	Stadium: Abel Sastre; Referee: Esteban Nasier

January 24, 2019	Deportivo Roca	1–0	Alvarado	General Roca, Pcia. de Río Negro
21:30	Aguirre 16'	Report		Stadium: Luis Maiolino; Referee: Bruno Bocca

January 23, 2019	Douglas Haig	1–0	Deportivo Camioneros	Pergamino, Pcia. de Buenos Aires
21:30	Duma 27' (pen.)	Report		Stadium: Miguel Morales; Referee: Carlos Córdoba

January 23, 2019	Juventud Unida (G)	0–0	Gimnasia y Esgrima (CdU)	Gualeguaychú, Pcia. de Entre Rios
21:15		Report		Stadium: De Los Eucaliptos; Referee: Adrián Franklin

January 23, 2019	Atlético Paraná	1–1	Defensores de Belgrano (VR)	Paraná, Pcia. de Entre Rios
21:00	Spinelli 37'	Report	Coronel 83'	Stadium: Pedro Mutio; Referee: Nahuel Viñas

January 23, 2019	Sportivo Belgrano	1–0	Estudiantes (RC)	San Francisco, Pcia. de Córdoba
21:15	Catube 61'	Report		Stadium: Oscar C. Boero; Referee: Diego Brizuela

January 23, 2019	Estudiantes (SL)	1–0	Desamparados	La Punta, Pcia. de San Luis
21:30	Rodríguez 46'	Report		Stadium: Provincial Juan Gilberto Funes; Referee: Jonathan Correa

January 23, 2019	Altos Hornos Zapla	1–0	Gimnasia y Tiro	Palpalá, Pcia. de Jujuy
21:30	Guevara 90+4'	Report		Stadium: Emilio Fabrizzi; Referee: Luis Lobo Medina

January 23, 2019	Crucero del Norte	1–2	Boca Unidos	Garupá, Pcia. de Misiones
21:00	Molinas 1'	Report	Fabro 57', 58'	Stadium: Comandante Andrés Guacurarí; Referee: José Sandoval

January 20, 2019	Sansinena	1–1	Villa Mitre	General Daniel Cerri, Pcia. de Buenos Aires
21:00	Scheffer 26' (pen.)	Report	Formigo 3'	Stadium: Luis Molina; Referee: Bruno Bocca

January 20, 2019	Sarmiento (R)	2–1	Chaco For Ever	Resistencia, Pcia. de Chaco
20:10	Silba 59' (pen.), 72'	Report	Magno 47'	Stadium: Centenario; Referee: César Ceballos

January 20, 2019	Deportivo Maipú	2–1	Huracán Las Heras	Maipú, Pcia. de Mendoza
18:15	Veliez 65'; Martínez 71'	Report	Juncos 89'	Stadium: Omar Higinio Sperdutti; Referee: Jonathan Correa

January 20, 2019	San Jorge (T)	3–3	Unión (S)	San Miguel de Tucumán, Pcia. de Tucumán
17:00	Tarasco 74'; Serrano 78'; Tapia 80'	Report	Palacios Hurtado 16', 28'; Molina 32'	Stadium: Ángel Pascual Sáez; Referee: Adrián Franklin

==== Second leg ====
January 27, 2019	Sol de Mayo	2–0 (3–2 agg.)	Deportivo Madryn	Viedma, Pcia. de Río Negro
17:15	Galván 19'; Reyes 90+4'	Report		Stadium: Sol de Mayo; Referee: Bruno Bocca

January 28, 2019	Alvarado	2–1 (2–2 agg.)	Deportivo Roca	Mar del Plata, Pcia. de Buenos Aires
21:00	Gentile 77'; Ponce 81'	Report	Guajardo 90+4'	Stadium: José María Minella; Referee: Fernando Omar Marcos

January 27, 2019	Deportivo Camioneros	0–0 (0–1 agg.)	Douglas Haig	Nueve de Abril, Pcia. de Buenos Aires
17:00		Report		Stadium: Hugo Moyano; Referee: Carlos Gariano

January 27, 2019	Gimnasia y Esgrima (CdU)	0–0 (0–0 agg.) (4–5 p)	Juventud Unida (G)	Concepción del Uruguay, Pcia. de Entre Ríos
17:00		Report		Stadium: Manuel y Ramón Núñez; Referee: Nahuel Viñas
	Penalties
	Vercellino (penalty missed); Torres (penalty scored); Lazza (penalty scored); Umpiérrez (penalty scored); Leguizamón (penalty scored); Crusat (penalty missed)		(penalty scored) De León; (penalty scored) Ronconi; (penalty missed) Fiorotto; (penalty scored) Rodríguez Rojas; (penalty scored) Abello; (penalty scored) Lonardi

January 27, 2019	Defensores de Belgrano (VR)	0–0 (1–1 agg.)	Atlético Paraná	Villa Ramallo, Pcia. de Buenos Aires
18:00		Report		Stadium: Salomón Boeseldín; Referee: Alejo Cid

January 27, 2019	Estudiantes (RC)	4–0 (4–1 agg.)	Sportivo Belgrano	Río Cuarto, Pcia. de Córdoba
21:00	Foglia 18' (pen.); Cainelli 49'; Cabrera 83'; Ferreira 86' (pen.)	Report		Stadium: Ciudad de Río Cuarto; Referee: Sebastián Mastrángelo

January 27, 2019	Desamparados	2–1 (2–2 agg.)	Estudiantes (SL)	San Juan, Pcia. de San Juan
21:00	Lastra 38' (pen.); Fondacaro 45'	Report	Corulo 90+2'	Stadium: El Serpentario; Referee: César Ceballos

January 27, 2019	Gimnasia y Tiro	1–0 (1–1 agg.) (4–3 p)	Altos Hornos Zapla	Salta, Pcia. de Salta
19:00	Iturrieta 45'	Report		Stadium: Gigante del Norte; Referee: Rodrigo Rivero
	Penalties
	F. Giménez (penalty scored); L. Herrera (penalty missed); Leguiza (penalty scored); Pereyra (penalty scored); Pusula (penalty missed); Medina (penalty missed); A. Herrera (penalty scored)		(penalty scored) Robles; (penalty scored) Fernández; (penalty missed) Noriega; (penalty scored) Tello; (penalty missed) Guzmán; (penalty missed) Domínguez; (penalty missed) Aguirre

January 27, 2019	Boca Unidos	1–0 (3–1 agg.)	Crucero del Norte	Corrientes, Pcia. de Corrientes
18:00	Fabro 41'	Report		Stadium: Leoncio Benítez; Referee: Adrián Franklin

January 27, 2019	Villa Mitre	3–0 (4–1 agg.)	Sansinena	Bahía Blanca, Pcia. de Buenos Aires
21:00	E. González 22'; H. González 33'; M. López 80'	Report		Stadium: El Fortín; Referee: Sergio Testa

January 27, 2019	Chaco For Ever	0–0 (1–2 agg.)	Sarmiento (R)	Resistencia, Pcia. de Chaco
19:15		Report		Stadium: Juan Alberto García; Referee: Carlos Córdoba

January 27, 2019	Huracán Las Heras	2–1 (3–3 agg.) (4–3 p)	Deportivo Maipú	Las Heras, Pcia. de Mendoza
18:00	Cámara 29'; Orué 85'	Report	Sánchez 68'	Stadium: General San Martín; Referee: Mario Ejarque
	Penalties
	Garay (penalty scored); Hongn (penalty scored); Tallura (penalty scored); Agudiak (penalty missed); Vallés (penalty scored)		(penalty missed) Villarino; (penalty missed) Aguirre; (penalty scored) Vera; (penalty scored) Pérez Tarifa; (penalty scored) Daher

January 27, 2019	Unión (S)	2–2 (5–5 agg.)	San Jorge (T)	Sunchales, Pcia. de Santa Fe
20:00	Palacios Hurtado 42'; Boasso 50' (pen.)	Report	Valdez 57'; Tapia 69'	Stadium: La Fortaleza del Bicho; Referee: Carlos Boxler

== Final Rounds ==
=== Draw ===
The draw for the Final Rounds was held on 31 January 2019, 12:30 at AFA Futsal Stadium in Ezeiza. The 64 qualified teams were divided in four groups. Teams were seeded by their historical performance and Division. Champions of AFA tournaments playing in Argentine Primera División were allocated to Group A. The matches were drawn from the respective confronts: A vs. C; B vs. D. Some combinations were avoided for security reasons.

Group A	Group B	Group C	Group D
Argentinos Juniors; Banfield; Boca Juniors; Estudiantes (LP); Gimnasia y Esgrima (LP); Huracán; Independiente; Lanús; Newell's Old Boys; Racing; River Plate; Rosario Central; San Lorenzo; Vélez Sarsfield	Aldosivi; Almagro; Arsenal; Atlético Tucumán; Belgrano; Colón; Defensa y Justicia; Godoy Cruz; Independiente Rivadavia; Mitre (SdE); Nueva Chicago; Patronato; San Martín (SJ); San Martín (T); Sarmiento (J); Talleres (C); Tigre; Unión	Argentino (M); Atlas; Boca Unidos; Defensores de Belgrano (VR); Deportivo Roca ^{[1]}; Douglas Haig; Estudiantes (RC); Estudiantes (SL); Gimnasia y Tiro ^{[1]}; Huracán Las Heras; Juventud Unida (G); Real Pilar; Sarmiento (R); Sol de Mayo; Unión (S); Villa Mitre	Acassuso (Pot 5); Agropecuario Argentino (Pot 5); All Boys (Pot 4); Atlanta (Pot 4); Atlético de Rafaela (Pot 5); Barracas Central (Pot 5); Central Córdoba (SdE) (Pot 4); Deportivo Armenio (Pot 5); Deportivo Riestra (Pot 5); Dock Sud (Pot 5); Estudiantes (BA) (Pot 4); Gimnasia y Esgrima (M) (Pot 4); Laferrere (Pot 5); Midland (Pot 5); Platense (Pot 5); Villa Dálmine (Pot 5)

^{1} After the draw between Group A and C, the remaining Group C teams Deportivo Roca and Gimnasia y Tiro were moved to Group D – (Pot 5).

=== Bracket ===
==== Upper bracket ====
Round of 64
Newell's Old Boys	1
Villa Mitre	2
San Martín (SJ)	1
Villa Dálmine	0
Sarmiento (J)	0
All Boys	2
Nueva Chicago	0
Central Córdoba (SdE)	1
San Lorenzo	0
Estudiantes (SL)	2
Unión	0
Barracas Central	1
Mitre (SdE)	1
Deportivo Roca	0
Estudiantes (LP)	5
Sarmiento (R)	1
Gimnasia y Esgrima (LP) (p)	0 (5)
Defensores de Belgrano (VR)	0 (3)
Defensa y Justicia	1
Gimnasia y Tiro	0
Patronato (p)	1 (2)
Dock Sud	1 (1)
Independiente	4
Atlas	0
Lanús	2
Huracán Las Heras	0
Independiente Rivadavia	1
Midland	0
San Martín (T) (p)	2 (5)
Agropecuario Argentino	2 (4)
Argentinos Juniors	4
Douglas Haig	1

Round of 32
Villa Mitre	1
San Martín (SJ)	0
All Boys	0
Central Córdoba (SdE)	1
Estudiantes (SL)	2
Barracas Central	0
Mitre (SdE)	0
Estudiantes (LP)	2
Gimnasia y Esgrima (LP)	1 (3)
Defensa y Justicia (p)	1 (4)
Patronato	0
Independiente	1
Lanús	1
Independiente Rivadavia	0
San Martín (T)	0 (2)
Argentinos Juniors (p)	0 (3)

Round of 16
Villa Mitre	1
Central Córdoba (SdE)	2
Estudiantes (SL)	2 (2)
Estudiantes (LP) (p)	2 (4)
Defensa y Justicia	0
Independiente	1
Lanús	4
Argentinos Juniors	1

Quarterfinals
Central Córdoba (SdE)	1
Estudiantes (LP)	0
Independiente	0
Lanús	2

Semifinals
Central Córdoba (SdE)	1
Lanús	0

==== Lower bracket ====
Round of 64
Huracán	2
Unión (S)	0
Godoy Cruz	2
Deportivo Armenio	1
Aldosivi	0
Gimnasia y Esgrima (M)	1
River Plate	3
Argentino (M)	0
Boca Juniors	2
Estudiantes (RC)	0
Almagro (p)	1 (4)
Atlético de Rafaela	1 (2)
Talleres (C)	5
Laferrere	0
Banfield	3
Juventud Unida (G)	0
Rosario Central	2 (4)
Sol de Mayo (p)	2 (5)
Colón	3
Acassuso	0
Atlético Tucumán	1
Platense	0
Racing	0 (3)
Boca Unidos (p)	0 (4)
Arsenal	2
Atlanta	0
Tigre	0
Estudiantes (BA)	3
Belgrano	3
Deportivo Riestra	0
Vélez Sarsfield	0
Real Pilar	1

Round of 32
Huracán	1 (1)
Godoy Cruz (p)	1 (2)
Gimnasia y Esgrima (M)	1 (4)
River Plate (p)	1 (5)
Boca Juniors	1 (1)
Almagro (p)	1 (3)
Talleres (C) (p)	0 (6)
Banfield	0 (5)
Sol de Mayo	0
Colón	4
Atlético Tucumán (p)	2 (5)
Boca Unidos	2 (4)
Arsenal	2
Estudiantes (BA)	3
Belgrano	0
Real Pilar	1

Round of 16
Godoy Cruz	0
River Plate	1
Almagro	1
Talleres (C)	0
Colón (p)	1 (4)
Atlético Tucumán	1 (3)
Estudiantes (BA) (p)	1 (4)
Real Pilar	1 (3)

Quarterfinals
River Plate	2
Almagro	0
Colón	2 (6)
Estudiantes (BA) (p)	2 (7)

Semifinals
River Plate	2
Estudiantes (BA)	0

=== Round of 64 ===
The Round of 64 had 13 qualified teams from the Regional Round (13 teams from Torneo Federal A), 13 qualified teams from the Metropolitan Zone (6 teams from Primera B Metropolitana; 4 teams from Primera C and 3 teams from Primera D), 12 teams from Primera B Nacional and 26 teams from Primera División. The round was played between 26 February and 21 July, in a single knock-out match format. The 32 winning teams advanced to the Round of 32.

March 24, 2019	Newell's Old Boys	1–2	Villa Mitre	Santa Fe, Pcia. de Santa Fe
17:10	A. Rodríguez 52'	Report	Herrera 6'; L. López 43'	Stadium: 15 de Abril; Referee: Lucas Novelli

March 7, 2019	Vélez Sarsfield	0–1	Real Pilar	Turdera, Pcia. de Buenos Aires
20:10		Report	Ríos 35'	Stadium: Alfredo Beranger; Referee: Lucas Comesaña

May 15, 2019	Huracán	2–0	Unión (S)	Santa Fe, Pcia. de Santa Fe
16:00	Gamba 54' (pen.); Salcedo 78'	Report		Stadium: Brigadier General Estanislao López; Referee: Pablo Dóvalo

March 5, 2019	Argentinos Juniors	4–1	Douglas Haig	Sarandí, Pcia. de Buenos Aires
17:10	Spinelli 37'; Barquett 44'; Paiva 57'; Hauche 87'	Report	P. Mazza 32'	Stadium: Julio Humberto Grondona; Referee: Leandro Rey Hilfer

March 21, 2019	Gimnasia y Esgrima (LP)	0–0 (5–3 p)	Defensores de Belgrano (VR)	Santa Fe, Pcia. de Santa Fe
18:10		Report		Stadium: 15 de Abril; Referee: Silvio Trucco
	Penalties
	Silva (penalty scored); Faravelli (penalty scored); Licht (penalty scored); Piovi (penalty scored); Simeone (penalty scored)		(penalty missed) Fernández; (penalty scored) Coronel; (penalty scored) Romero; (penalty scored) Olego

February 27, 2019	Banfield	3–0	Juventud Unida (G)	Quilmes, Pcia. de Buenos Aires
17:10	Carranza 18'; Lenis 48'; Payero 67'	Report		Stadium: Centenario Ciudad de Quilmes; Referee: Luis Lobo Medina

February 26, 2019	Rosario Central	2–2 (4–5 p)	Sol de Mayo	Santa Fe, Pcia. de Santa Fe
21:10	Riaño 63', 65'	Report	Reyes 44'; Malacarne 57'	Stadium: Brigadier General Estanislao López; Referee: Héctor Paletta
	Penalties
	Riaño (penalty scored); Herrera (penalty missed); Lovera (penalty scored); Camacho (penalty scored); Molina (penalty scored); Becker (penalty missed)		(penalty missed) García; (penalty scored) Elordi; (penalty scored) H. Morales; (penalty scored) L. Morales; (penalty scored) Galván; (penalty scored) Malacarne

May 22, 2019	Estudiantes (LP)	5–1	Sarmiento (R)	Turdera, Pcia. de Buenos Aires
18:10	López 27', 29'; Gómez 36'; Castro 51'; Pavone 84'	Report	Silba 13'	Stadium: Alfredo Beranger; Referee: Diego Ceballos

May 22, 2019	San Lorenzo	0–2	Estudiantes (SL)	Santa Fe, Pcia. de Santa Fe
21:10		Report	Distaulo 13'; Amieva 46'	Stadium: 15 de Abril; Referee: Leandro Rey Hilfer

July 21, 2019	Racing	0–0 (3–4 p)	Boca Unidos	Lanús, Pcia. de Buenos Aires
17:10		Report		Stadium: Ciudad de Lanús – Néstor Díaz Pérez; Referee: Hernán Mastrángelo
	Penalties
	López (penalty scored); Rojas (penalty scored); Barbona (penalty missed); Pillud (penalty scored); Cvitanich (penalty missed); Díaz (penalty missed)		(penalty scored) Baroni; (penalty scored) Ojeda; (penalty missed) Fabro; (penalty scored) A. Morales; (penalty missed) Vizcarra; (penalty scored) Alloco

April 19, 2019	Boca Juniors	2–0	Estudiantes (RC)	Mar del Plata, Pcia. de Buenos Aires
18:00	Ábila 18'; Zárate 44'	Report		Stadium: José María Minella; Referee: Pablo Dóvalo

March 6, 2019	Independiente	4–0	Atlas	Banfield, Pcia. de Buenos Aires
19:30	Domínguez 14'; Molina 16'; Figal 69'; Burdisso 81'	Report		Stadium: Florencio Sola; Referee: Yael Falcón Pérez

March 21, 2019	Lanús	2–0	Huracán Las Heras	Mendoza, Pcia. de Mendoza
20:10	Sand 53' (pen.); García Guerreño 68'	Report		Stadium: Malvinas Argentinas; Referee: Hernán Mastrángelo

April 17, 2019	River Plate	3–0	Argentino (M)	Salta, Pcia. de Salta
21:10	Borré 69'; Suárez 77', 90+2'	Report		Stadium: Padre Ernesto Martearena; Referee: Hernán Mastrángelo

April 10, 2019	Arsenal	2–0	Atlanta	Turdera, Pcia. de Buenos Aires
17:10	Cérica 15'; Antilef 49'	Report		Stadium: Alfredo Beranger; Referee: Nazareno Arasa

April 3, 2019	Nueva Chicago	0–1	Central Córdoba (SdE)	Santa Fe, Pcia. de Santa Fe
16:10		Report	Melivilo 46'	Stadium: Brigadier General Estanislao López; Referee: Pablo Giménez

March 27, 2019	Sarmiento (J)	0–2	All Boys	Sarandí, Pcia. de Buenos Aires
17:10		Report	Céliz 33', 67'	Stadium: Julio Humberto Grondona; Referee: Pablo Echavarría

February 28, 2019	Tigre	0–3	Estudiantes (BA)	Sarandí, Pcia. de Buenos Aires
20:10		Report	Joao 41'; Ruiz Gómez 50' (pen.); Torres 88'	Stadium: Julio Humberto Grondona; Referee: Julio Barraza

March 19, 2019	Aldosivi	0–1	Gimnasia y Esgrima (M)	Turdera, Pcia. de Buenos Aires
18:10		Report	Cucchi 78' (pen.)	Stadium: Alfredo Beranger; Referee: Gerardo Méndez Cedro

April 23, 2019	Independiente Rivadavia	1–0	Midland	La Punta, Pcia. de San Luis
21:10	Asenjo 47'	Report		Stadium: Provincial Juan Gilberto Funes; Referee: Cristian Cernadas

March 13, 2019	Patronato	1–1 (2–1 p)	Dock Sud	Rafaela, Pcia. de Santa Fe
17:10	Rescaldani 10'	Report	Cariaga 90+5'	Stadium: Nuevo Monumental; Referee: Fernando Echenique
	Penalties
	Mansilla (penalty missed); Pantaleone (penalty scored); Andrade (penalty missed); Cacheiro (penalty missed); Barreto (penalty scored)		(penalty missed) Caruso; (penalty missed) Miranda Moreira; (penalty scored) Orellana; (penalty missed) Pombo; (penalty missed) Cariaga

March 7, 2019	Almagro	1–1 (4–2 p)	Atlético de Rafaela	Quilmes, Pcia. de Buenos Aires
17:10	Acosta 40'	Report	Borgnino 90+2'	Stadium: Centenario Ciudad de Quilmes; Referee: Mario Ejarque
	Penalties
	Denis (penalty scored); Benítez (penalty scored); Susvielles (penalty scored); Arce (penalty scored)		(penalty scored) Borgnino; (penalty missed) Blondel; (penalty scored) Quiroga; (penalty missed) Esquivel

March 20, 2019	Atlético Tucumán	1–0	Platense	Salta, Pcia. de Salta
20:10	Núñez 7'	Report		Stadium: Padre Ernesto Martearena; Referee: Maximiliano Ramírez

April 25, 2019	Unión	0–1	Barracas Central	Sarandí, Pcia. de Buenos Aires
20:10		Report	Romero 13'	Stadium: Julio Humberto Grondona; Referee: Diego Ceballos

April 17, 2019	Mitre (SdE)	1–0	Deportivo Roca	Quilmes, Pcia. de Buenos Aires
17:10	Cadenazzi 90'	Report		Stadium: Centenario Ciudad de Quilmes; Referee: Pablo Echavarría

April 24, 2019	Colón	3–0	Acassuso	Turdera, Pcia. de Buenos Aires
19:10	Morelo 24'; L. Rodríguez 42'; Zuqui 90'	Report		Stadium: Alfredo Beranger; Referee: Pablo Dóvalo

March 25, 2019	Talleres (C)	5–0	Laferrere	Rosario, Pcia. de Santa Fe
18:10	Moreno 24'; Palacios 31', 57', 84'; Ramírez 74'	Report		Stadium: Marcelo Bielsa; Referee: Ariel Penel

April 16, 2019	Defensa y Justicia	1–0	Gimnasia y Tiro	Banfield, Pcia. de Buenos Aires
20:05	Fernández 26'	Report		Stadium: Florencio Sola; Referee: Andrés Merlos

March 6, 2019	San Martín (T)	2–2 (5–4 p)	Agropecuario Argentino	Salta, Pcia. de Salta
21:35	Gómez 57' (pen.); González 84'	Report	Urquijo 6'; Klusener 88'	Stadium: Padre Ernesto Martearena; Referee: Pablo Echavarría
	Penalties
	Gómez (penalty scored); Giménez (penalty scored); González (penalty missed); Vitale (penalty scored); Pons (penalty scored); Lamardo (penalty scored)		(penalty missed) Blanco; (penalty scored) Klusener; (penalty scored) Rosso; (penalty scored) Narese; (penalty scored) Barinaga; (penalty missed) Salort

March 23, 2019	Godoy Cruz	2–1	Deportivo Armenio	Córdoba, Pcia. de Córdoba
17:10	Ramis 90+1', 90+2'	Report	Ortiz 26'	Stadium: Presidente Perón; Referee: Héctor Paletta

May 8, 2019	Belgrano	3–0	Deportivo Riestra	Sarandí, Pcia. de Buenos Aires
17:10	Meli 18'; Brunetta 56'; Sequeira 75'	Report		Stadium: Julio Humberto Grondona; Referee: Sebastián Bresba

March 20, 2019	San Martín (SJ)	1–0	Villa Dálmine	La Plata, Pcia. de Buenos Aires
18:10	Osorio 63'	Report		Stadium: Juan Carmelo Zerillo; Referee: Nazareno Arasa

=== Round of 32 ===
This round had 32 qualified teams from the Round of 64. The round was played between 14 July and 19 September, in a single knock-out match format. The 16 winning teams advanced to the Round of 16.

August 3, 2019	Villa Mitre	1–0	San Martín (SJ)	Cutral Có, Pcia. de Neuquén
13:10	Herrera 86'	Report		Stadium: Coloso del Ruca Quimey; Referee: Jorge Baliño

August 21, 2019	All Boys	0–1	Central Córdoba (SdE)	Santa Fe, Pcia. de Santa Fe
15:30		Report	J. Rodríguez 13'	Stadium: 15 de Abril; Referee: Luis Lobo Medina

September 19, 2019	Estudiantes (SL)	2–0	Barracas Central	Turdera, Pcia. de Buenos Aires
17:10	González 75' (o.g.); Díaz 85'	Report		Stadium: Alfredo Beranger; Referee: Julio Barraza

July 20, 2019	Mitre (SdE)	0–2	Estudiantes (LP)	Cutral Có, Pcia. de Neuquén
13:10		Report	Pellegrini 21'; F. González 73'	Stadium: Coloso del Ruca Quimey; Referee: Jorge Baliño

July 20, 2019	Gimnasia y Esgrima (LP)	1–1 (3–4 p)	Defensa y Justicia	Turdera, Pcia. de Buenos Aires
17:10	Comba 57'	Report	Herrera 45+1'	Stadium: Alfredo Beranger; Referee: Ariel Penel
	Penalties
	García (penalty scored); Mansilla (penalty scored); Velázquez (penalty scored); Tijanovich (penalty missed); Ayala (penalty missed)		(penalty scored) Fernández; (penalty scored) Piovi; (penalty scored) Tripichio; (penalty scored) Castro

August 28, 2019	Patronato	0–1	Independiente	Villa Mercedes, Pcia. de San Luis
17:00		Report	Blanco 57'	Stadium: Único de Villa Mercedes; Referee: Nicolás Lamolina

July 20, 2019	Lanús	1–0	Independiente Rivadavia	Sarandí, Pcia. de Buenos Aires
21:10	Moreno 90+3'	Report		Stadium: Julio Humberto Grondona; Referee: Diego Abal

August 21, 2019	San Martín (T)	0–0 (2–3 p)	Argentinos Juniors	Salta, Pcia. de Salta
19:15		Report		Stadium: Padre Ernesto Martearena; Referee: Fernando Espinoza
	Penalties
	Moreira (penalty missed); Diarte (penalty scored); Lamardo (penalty scored); Pons (penalty missed); Castro (penalty missed); Luciatti (penalty missed)		(penalty scored) Vera; (penalty scored) Torrén; (penalty missed) Gómez; (penalty missed) Hauche; (penalty missed) Chaves; (penalty scored) Quintana

July 14, 2019	Huracán	1–1 (1–2 p)	Godoy Cruz	Córdoba, Pcia. de Córdoba
16:40	Salcedo 45+2'	Report	Varela 28'	Stadium: Presidente Perón; Referee: Darío Herrera
	Penalties
	Gamba (penalty missed); Chávez (penalty missed); Gómez (penalty scored); Salcedo (penalty missed); Faravelli (penalty missed)		(penalty scored) García; (penalty missed) Brunetta; (penalty scored) Cardona; (penalty missed) Varela

July 16, 2019	Gimnasia y Esgrima (M)	1–1 (4–5 p)	River Plate	Villa Mercedes, Pcia. de San Luis
21:10	Vera 70'	Report	Palacios 65'	Stadium: Único de Villa Mercedes; Referee: Andrés Merlos
	Penalties
	Aguirre (penalty scored); Zabaleta (penalty scored); Ta. Marchiori (penalty scored); Andrada (penalty missed); Carrizo (penalty scored)		(penalty scored) Fernández; (penalty scored) De La Cruz; (penalty scored) Ferreira; (penalty scored) Borré; (penalty scored) Rollheiser

August 13, 2019	Boca Juniors	1–1 (1–3 p)	Almagro	La Plata, Pcia. de Buenos Aires
21:10	De Rossi 27'	Report	Martínez 81'	Stadium: Ciudad de La Plata; Referee: Silvio Trucco
	Penalties
	Tevez (penalty scored); A. Mac Allister (penalty missed); Hurtado (penalty missed); Salvio (penalty missed)		(penalty scored) Denis; (penalty scored) Wilchez; (penalty scored) Coscia

September 18, 2019	Talleres (C)	0–0 (6–5 p)	Banfield	Rosario, Pcia. de Santa Fe
18:10		Report		Stadium: Marcelo Bielsa; Referee: Silvio Trucco
	Penalties
	Moreno (penalty scored); Pochettino (penalty scored); Menéndez (penalty scored); Herrera (penalty missed); Bustos (penalty scored); Medina (penalty scored); Díaz (penalty scored)		(penalty scored) Civelli; (penalty scored) Rodríguez; (penalty scored) Carranza; (penalty missed) Vittor; (penalty scored) Bertolo; (penalty scored) Gómez; (penalty missed) Urzi

August 28, 2019	Sol de Mayo	0–4	Colón	Rafaela, Pcia. de Santa Fe
14:40		Report	Pierotti 5'; Da Luz 21'; Leguizamón 38'; Chancalay 80'	Stadium: Nuevo Monumental; Referee: Ariel Penel

September 4, 2019	Atlético Tucumán	2–2 (5–4 p)	Boca Unidos	Salta, Pcia. de Salta
21:10	Huth 56' (o.g.); Toledo 59'	Report	Medina 72' (pen.); Núñez 83'	Stadium: Padre Ernesto Martearena; Referee: Jorge Baliño
	Penalties
	Toledo (penalty scored); Acosta (penalty scored); Gissi (penalty scored); Heredia (penalty scored); Castellani (penalty missed); Bravo (penalty scored)		(penalty scored) Baroni; (penalty scored) Ojeda; (penalty scored) A. Morales; (penalty missed) Vizcarra; (penalty scored) Medina; (penalty missed) Alloco

August 28, 2019	Arsenal	2–3	Estudiantes (BA)	Turdera, Pcia. de Buenos Aires
19:10	García 37'; Cérica 90+3'	Report	Impini 5'; Silva 14'; Campana 30'	Stadium: Alfredo Beranger; Referee: Fernando Echenique

July 27, 2019	Belgrano	0–1	Real Pilar	Cutral Có, Pcia. de Neuquén
12:10		Report	Chimeli 34'	Stadium: Coloso del Ruca Quimey; Referee: Jorge Baliño

=== Round of 16 ===
This round had the 16 qualified teams from the Round of 32. The round was played between 7 September and 10 October, in a single knock-out match format. The 8 winning teams advanced to the Quarterfinals.

September 8, 2019	Villa Mitre	1–2	Central Córdoba (SdE)	Cutral Có, Pcia. de Neuquén
15:05	H. González 90'	Report	Herrera 76'; Alzugaray 89'	Stadium: Coloso del Ruca Quimey; Referee: Lucas Comesaña

October 10, 2019	Estudiantes (SL)	2–2 (2–4 p)	Estudiantes (LP)	Sarandí, Pcia. de Buenos Aires
18:10	Felice 7'; Rodríguez 90+3'	Report	Estévez 58'; Retegui 88'	Stadium: Julio Humberto Grondona; Referee: Hernán Mastrángelo
	Penalties
	Giménez (penalty scored); Cuello (penalty missed); Echarri (penalty missed); Rodríguez (penalty scored)		(penalty scored) Schunke; (penalty scored) Estévez; (penalty missed) Retegui; (penalty scored) López; (penalty scored) García

September 26, 2019	Defensa y Justicia	0–1	Independiente	Quilmes, Pcia. de Buenos Aires
21:10		Report	Silva 45+3'	Stadium: Centenario Ciudad de Quilmes; Referee: Fernando Echenique

September 7, 2019	Lanús	4–1	Argentinos Juniors	Sarandí, Pcia. de Buenos Aires
17:10	Vera 6'; Pasquini 22'; Sand 62' (pen.); Orsini 85'	Report	Silva 38' (pen.)	Stadium: Julio Humberto Grondona; Referee: Ariel Penel

September 18, 2019	Godoy Cruz	0–1	River Plate	Lanús, Pcia. de Buenos Aires
21:10		Report	Varela 21' (o.g.)	Stadium: Ciudad de Lanús – Néstor Díaz Pérez; Referee: Facundo Tello

October 7, 2019	Almagro	1–0	Talleres (C)	Rosario, Pcia. de Santa Fe
17:40	Suárez 42'	Report		Stadium: Marcelo Bielsa; Referee: Jorge Baliño

September 10, 2019	Colón	1–1 (4–3 p)	Atlético Tucumán	Paraná, Pcia. de Entre Ríos
19:10	Schmidt 48'	Report	Toledo 83'	Stadium: Presbítero Bartolomé Grella; Referee: Pablo Echavarría
	Penalties
	Ortega (penalty scored); Celis (penalty scored); Díaz (penalty missed); Bernardi (penalty scored); Esparza (penalty scored)		(penalty scored) Toledo; (penalty scored) Heredia; (penalty scored) Gissi; (penalty missed) Acosta; (penalty missed) Díaz

September 25, 2019	Estudiantes (BA)	1–1 (4–3 p)	Real Pilar	Turdera, Pcia. de Buenos Aires
20:00	Montoya 90+6'	Report	Schönfeld 9'	Stadium: Alfredo Beranger; Referee: Pablo Dóvalo
	Penalties
	Silva (penalty scored); González Metilli (penalty scored); Amarilla (penalty scored); Impini (penalty scored)		(penalty scored) Villafañe; (penalty missed) Maraia; (penalty scored) Pérez; (penalty scored) Ríos; (penalty missed) Otermin

=== Quarterfinals ===
This round had the 8 qualified teams from the Round of 16. The round was played between 11 and 25 October, in a single knock-out match format. The 4 winning teams advanced to the Semifinals.

October 16, 2019	Central Córdoba (SdE)	1–0	Estudiantes (LP)	Córdoba, Pcia. de Córdoba
15:35	Núñez 73'	Report		Stadium: Presidente Perón; Referee: Jorge Baliño

October 25, 2019	Independiente	0–2	Lanús	Rosario, Pcia. de Santa Fe
17:10		Report	Sand 45+2'; Abecasis 90'	Stadium: Marcelo Bielsa; Referee: Néstor Pitana

October 11, 2019	River Plate	2–0	Almagro	Mendoza, Pcia. de Mendoza
20:30	Borré 6'; Scocco 57'	Report		Stadium: Malvinas Argentinas; Referee: Ariel Penel

October 16, 2019	Colón	2–2 (6–7 p)	Estudiantes (BA)	Paraná, Pcia. de Entre Ríos
21:10	Zuqui 7', 38'	Report	García 3'; Impini 81'	Stadium: Presbítero Bartolomé Grella; Referee: Fernando Espinoza
	Penalties
	Ortiz (penalty missed); Estigarribia (penalty scored); Morelo (penalty scored); Olivera (penalty scored); Rodríguez (penalty scored); Aliendro (penalty scored); Fritzler (penalty scored); Zuqui (penalty missed)		(penalty scored) Silva; (penalty scored) González Metilli; (penalty scored) García; (penalty missed) Impini; (penalty scored) Figueroa; (penalty scored) Campana; (penalty scored) González; (penalty scored) Villarreal

=== Semifinals ===
This round had the 4 qualified teams from the Quarterfinals. The round was played on 14 November 2019, in a single knock-out match format. The 2 winning teams advanced to the Final.

November 14, 2019	Central Córdoba (SdE)	1–0	Lanús	La Rioja, Pcia. de La Rioja
17:00	Vega 54'	Report		Stadium: Carlos Augusto Mercado Luna; Referee: Patricio Loustau

November 14, 2019	River Plate	2–0	Estudiantes (BA)	Córdoba, Pcia. de Córdoba
21:10	Pinola 45+2'; Palacios 90+5'	Report		Stadium: Mario Alberto Kempes; Referee: Mauro Vigliano

=== Final ===
December 13, 2019
21:10

Central Córdoba (SdE)	0–3	River Plate
	Report	Scocco 30'; Fernández 67'; Álvarez 71'

Malvinas Argentinas, Mendoza
Referee: Facundo Tello

== Top goalscorers ==
Rank	Player	Club	Goals
1	(Argentina) Cristian Duma	Douglas Haig	4
2	(Argentina) Alejo Distaulo	Estudiantes (SL)	3
2	(Argentina) Martín Fabro	Boca Unidos	3
2	(Argentina) Alejandro Fernández	Altos Hornos Zapla	3
2	(Argentina) Sebastián Palacios	Talleres (C)	3
2	(Colombia) Wilson Palacios Hurtado	Unión (S)	3
2	(Argentina) José Sand	Lanús	3
2	(Argentina) Luis Silba	Sarmiento (R)	3
2	(Argentina) Fernando Zuqui	Colón	3

Source: Copa Argentina

== Team of the tournament ==
Team
Goalkeeper	Defenders	Midfielders	Forwards
Franco Armani (River Plate)	Paolo Impini (Estudiantes (BA)); Javier Pinola (River Plate); Nicolás Pasquini (Lanús)	Ignacio Fernández (River Plate); Cristian Vega (Central Córdoba (SdE)); Fernando Zuqui (Colón); Gervasio Núñez (Atlético Tucumán/Central Córdoba (SdE))	Cristian Duma (Douglas Haig); José Sand (Lanús); Ignacio Scocco (River Plate)
Substitutes
Christian Limousin (Almagro)	Héctor González (Villa Mitre)	Exequiel Palacios (River Plate); Marcelo Meli (Belgrano/Central Córdoba (SdE)); Martín Fabro (Boca Unidos)	Alejo Distaulo (Estudiantes (SL)); Wilson Chimeli (Real Pilar)
Coach
Marcelo Gallardo (River Plate)

Source: Copa Argentina

== See also ==
- 2018–19 Argentine Primera División
- 2018–19 Primera B Nacional
- 2018–19 Torneo Federal A
