= Cristian Vega =

Cristian Vega may refer to:

- Cristian Vega (One Life to Live), fictional character on One Life to Live
- Cristian Vega (footballer, born 1979), Argentine defender
- Cristian Vega (footballer, born 1993), Argentine midfielder
