= Hugo Silva =

Hugo Silva may refer to:

- Hugo Silva (actor), born 1977
- Hugo Silva (footballer, born 1988), footballer/manager
- Hugo Silva (footballer, born 1992), footballer
