= Juan Ignacio Duma =

Argentine-Chilean footballer

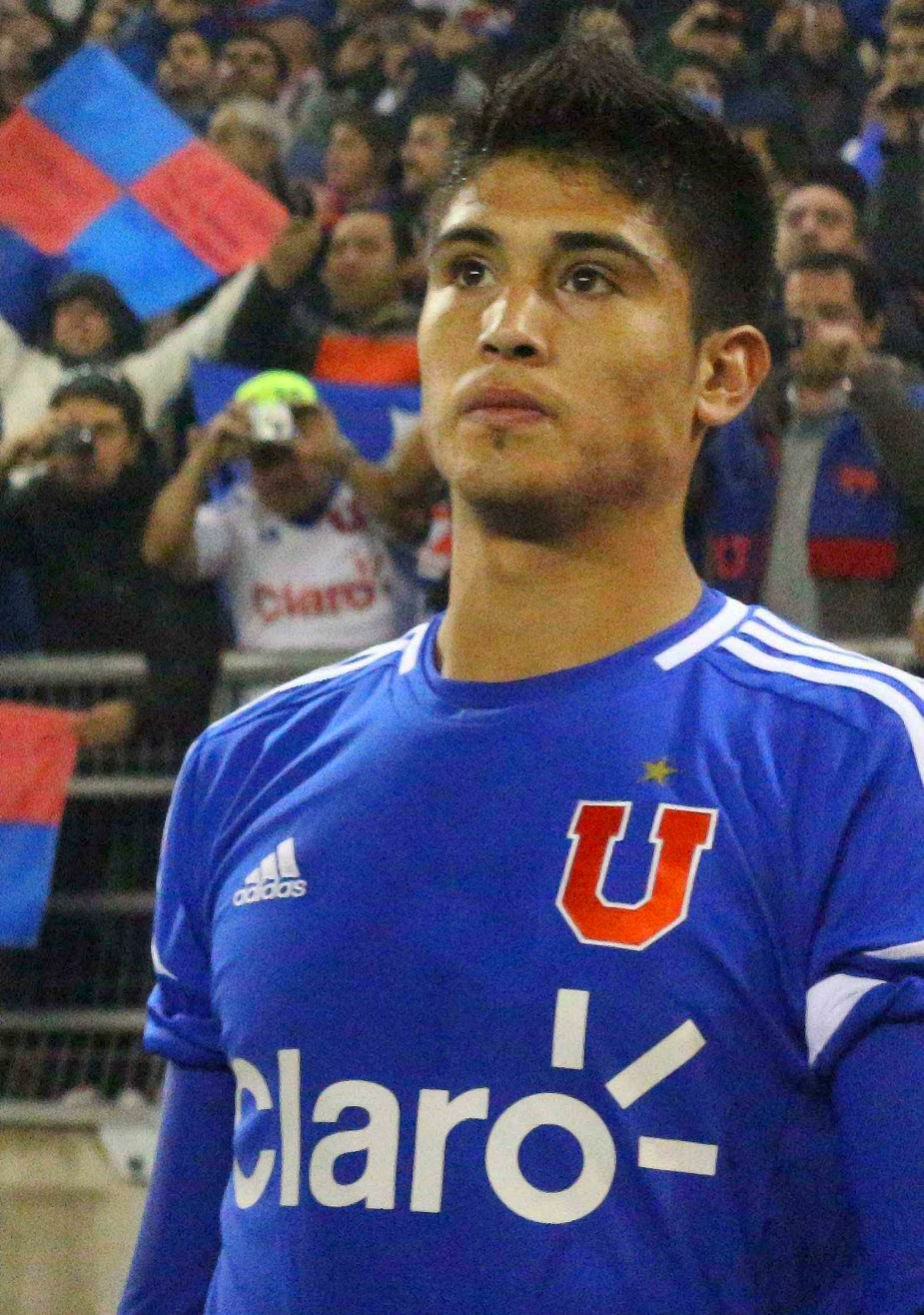
- Duma with Universidad de Chile in 2013

Personal information
- Full name: Juan Ignacio Duma
- Date of birth: December 8, 1993 (age 32)
- Place of birth: Vedia, Buenos Aires, Argentina
- Height: 1.74 m (5 ft 9 in)
- Position: Forward

Team information
- Current team: Cobreloa
- Number: 37

Youth career
- Unión y Sociedad Italiana
- 2011–2012: Universidad de Chile

Senior career*
Years	Team	Apps	(Gls)
2012–2015	Universidad de Chile	35	(8)
2014	→ Palestino (loan)	16	(4)
2015–2017	Huachipato	36	(10)
2018	Deportes Antofagasta	4	(0)
2019–2020	Barnechea	46	(8)
2021	Deportes Melipilla	18	(1)
2022	Barnechea	31	(14)
2023–2025	Santiago Wanderers	74	(23)
2026–	Cobreloa	15	(1)
- * Club domestic league appearances and goals as of 22 November 2026

Juan Ignacio Duma (born 8 December 1993) is an Argentinian naturalized Chilean footballer who plays as a forward for Cobreloa.

== Career ==
He debuted on 9 September 2012 in a match against Santiago Wanderers during the 2012 Copa Chile. He played his first league match on 29 September in a match against Unión La Calera.

Duma spent three seasons with Santiago Wanderers from 2023 to 2025.

a free agent during the first half of 2026, Duma joined Cobreloa for the second half of the year.

== Personal life ==
He is the cousin of the footballer Cristian Duma.

== Career statistics ==
=== Club ===
Club	Season	League		Continental		Cup		Total	
Club	Season	Apps	Goals	Apps	Goals	Apps	Goals	Apps	Goals
Universidad de Chile	2012	8	2	3	0	7	5	18	7
Universidad de Chile	2013	12	6	3	0	4	1	19	7
Universidad de Chile	2013–14	5	0	4	0	5	0	14	0
Universidad de Chile	2014–15	10	0	–	–	2	1	12	1
Universidad de Chile	Total	35	8	10	0	18	7	63	15
Career total		35	8	10	0	18	7	63	15

== Honours ==
Universidad de Chile

- Primera División de Chile: 2014 Apertura
- Copa Chile: 2012–13

Cobreloa

- Primera B de Chile: 2026
