= Cristian Duma =

Argentine footballer

Personal information
- Full name: Cristian David Duma
- Date of birth: 15 July 1996 (age 30)
- Place of birth: Pergamino, Argentina
- Height: 1.85 m (6 ft 1 in)
- Position: Forward

Team information
- Current team: Provincial Ovalle
- Number: 29

Youth career
- Douglas Haig

Senior career*
| Years | Team | Apps | (Gls) |
| 2017–2019 | Douglas Haig | 38 | (8) |
| 2019–2020 | Nacional | 0 | (0) |
| 2020 | Salamanca UDS | 1 | (0) |
| 2021 | Deportes Santa Cruz | 19 | (8) |
| 2022 | Deportes Iquique | 15 | (1) |
| 2022 | Sol de América | 15 | (4) |
| 2023 | Cumbayá | 9 | (0) |
| 2024 | Deportes Santa Cruz | 10 | (1) |
| 2025 | Deportes Linares | 21 | (21) |
| 2026– | Provincial Ovalle | 0 | (0) |
- * Club domestic league appearances and goals ‡ National team caps and goals as of 24 February 2026

Cristian David Duma (born 15 July 1996) is an Argentine footballer who plays as a forward for Chilean club Provincial Ovalle.

== Career ==
Duma started his career with Argentine second division side Douglas Haig, where he made 46 appearances and scored 14 goals.

Duma was the top scorer of the 2018–19 Copa Argentina with 4 goals.

In 2019, he signed for Nacional, one of the most successful clubs in Uruguay.

In 2020, he signed for Spanish third division team Salamanca UDS.

Before the 2021 season, Duma signed for Deportes Santa Cruz in the Primera B de Chile. On first half 2022, he played for Deportes Iquique in the same division.

In February 2026, Duma joined Provincial Ovalle from Deportes Linares.

== Personal life ==
He is the cousin of the footballer Juan Ignacio Duma.
