= Cristian Vega (footballer, born 1979) =

Argentine footballer

Personal information
- Full name: Cristian Javier Vega
- Date of birth: 27 August 1979 (age 47)
- Place of birth: Concordia, Argentina
- Height: 1.68 m (5 ft 6 in)
- Position: Defender

Senior career*
Years	Team	Apps	(Gls)
1999–2003	Flandria	106	(9)
2003–2004	Deportivo Morón	37	(4)
2004–2006	All Boys	62	(1)
2006–2007	Tristán Suárez	37	(1)
2007–2010	Los Andes	113	(5)
2010–2011	Unión Sunchales	35	(3)
2011–2012	Santamarina	25	(0)
2012–2013	Atlanta	24	(0)
2013–2014	Santamarina	13	(0)
Total		452	(23)
- * Club domestic league appearances and goals

Cristian Javier Vega (born 27 August 1979) is an Argentine former professional footballer who played as a defender.

== Career ==
Vega's career began in 1999 with Primera B Metropolitana side Flandria, a club the defender remained with for four years whilst scoring nine goals in one hundred and six encounters. 2003 saw Vega join Deportivo Morón, which preceded spells with All Boys and Tristán Suárez between then and 2007; he was selected over one hundred times in that period. Vega joined Los Andes ahead of the 2007–08 Primera B Metropolitana campaign, which subsequently led to them winning promotion to Primera B Nacional. He scored goals versus Quilmes and San Martín as Los Andes were then relegated, in what was his sole season in the second tier.

On 30 June 2010, Vega joined Torneo Argentino A's Unión Sunchales. Three goals in thirty-five games followed. Fellow Torneo Argentino A club Santamarina signed Vega in June 2011, prior to Atlanta of Primera B Metropolitana signing Vega for the 2012–13 campaign. After one year with Atlanta, Vega agreed to rejoin Santamarina in 2013. He made the final appearance of his senior career on 6 April 2014 as Santamarina drew 2–2 away to Guaraní Antonio Franco on their way to winning the 2013–14 Torneo Argentino A title. In total, Vega scored twenty-three goals in four hundred and fifty-two career league matches.

== Career statistics ==
Club statistics
Club	Season	League			Cup (Note: Includes the Copa Argentina)		League Cup		Continental		Other		Total	
Club	Season	Division	Apps	Goals	Apps	Goals	Apps	Goals	Apps	Goals	Apps	Goals	Apps	Goals
Deportivo Morón	2003–04	Primera B Metropolitana	37	4	0	0	—		—		0	0	37	4
Tristán Suárez	2006–07	Primera B Metropolitana	37	1	0	0	—		—		0	0	37	1
Los Andes	2008–09	Primera B Nacional	35	2	0	0	—		—		1 (Note: One appearance in the 2008–09 Primera B Nacional play-offs)	0	36	2
Unión Sunchales	2010–11	Torneo Argentino A	35	3	0	0	—		—		0	0	35	3
Santamarina	2011–12	Torneo Argentino A	25	0	1	0	—		—		0	0	26	0
Atlanta	2012–13	Primera B Metropolitana	24	0	0	0	—		—		0	0	24	0
Santamarina	2013–14	Torneo Argentino A	13	0	5	0	—		—		0	0	18	0
Career total			206	10	6	0	—		—		1	0	213	10

== Honours ==
Santamarina

- Torneo Argentino A: 2013–14
