= Jonás Romero =

Argentine footballer

Personal information
- Full name: Jonás Romero
- Date of birth: 21 August 2000 (age 26)
- Place of birth: Córdoba, Argentina
- Height: 1.59 m (5 ft 2 1/2 in)
- Position: Forward

Team information
- Current team: Atlético Tucumán

Youth career
- 2010–2017: Atlético Tucumán

Senior career*
| Years | Team | Apps | (Gls) |
| 2017– | Atlético Tucumán | 2 | (0) |
| 2021 | → Agropecuario (loan) | 14 | (0) |
- * Club domestic league appearances and goals as of 21:26, 13 March 2022 (UTC)

Jonás Romero (born 21 August 2000) is an Argentine professional footballer who plays as a forward for Argentine Primera División side Atlético Tucumán.

== Career ==
=== Club ===
Romero began in the youth system of Argentine Primera División side Atlético Tucumán. He first appeared in the Tucumán first-team for Copa Sudamericana matches against Oriente Petrolero, being an unused substitute for both second stage fixtures in July and August 2017. He was also a substitute for a Primera División match with Godoy Cruz later in August, prior to making his professional debut in September versus Independiente in the Copa Argentina. He featured for the first time in the Primera División in the club's final match of 2017–18 against Lanús.

=== International ===
In February 2018, Romero was called up to train with the Argentina U19 team.

== Career statistics ==
As of 15 May 2018.

Club statistics
| Club | Season | League | | | Cup (Note: Includes the Copa Argentina) | | League Cup | | Continental (Note: Includes the Copa Sudamericana) | | Other | | Total | |
| Club | Season | Division | Apps | Goals | Apps | Goals | Apps | Goals | Apps | Goals | Apps | Goals | Apps | Goals |
|---|---|---|---|---|---|---|---|---|---|---|---|---|---|---|
| Atlético Tucumán | 2017–18 | Primera División | 1 | 0 | 1 | 0 | — | | 0 | 0 | 0 | 0 | 2 | 0 |
| Career total | | | 1 | 0 | 1 | 0 | — | | 0 | 0 | 0 | 0 | 2 | 0 |
