= Pier Barrios =

Argentine footballer

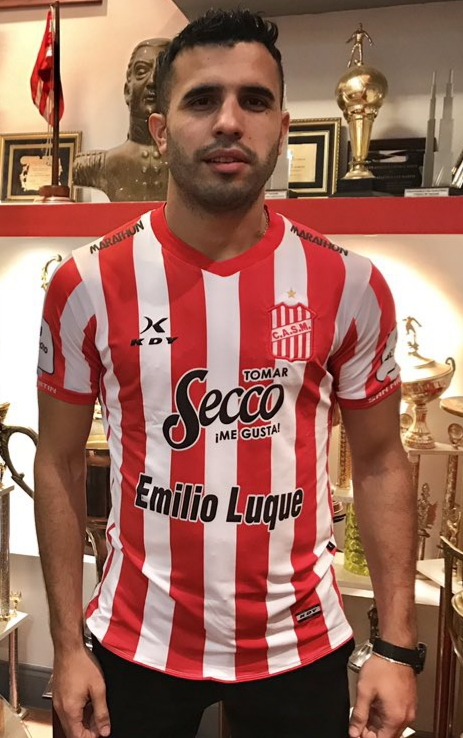
- Barrios in 2020

Personal information
- Full name: Pier Miqueas Barrios
- Date of birth: July 1, 1990 (age 36)
- Place of birth: Córdoba, Argentina
- Height: 1.80 m (5 ft 11 in)
- Position: Centre-back

Team information
- Current team: Colón

Youth career
- 2005–2008: CA Belgrano

Senior career*
Years	Team	Apps	(Gls)
2008–2017	CA Belgrano	131	(1)
2010–2011	→ Anderlecht (loan)	0	(0)
2013	→ Gimnasia de Jujuy (loan)	19	(0)
2016–2017	→ Ferro Carril Oeste (loan)	31	(1)
2018–2019	Atlético Tucumán	3	(27)
2019–2021	San Martín T.	2	(0)
2021–2022	Quilmes	41	(3)
2022–2025	Godoy Cruz	96	(3)
2025–2026	Melgar	30	(1)
2026–	Colón	4	(0)
- * Club domestic league appearances and goals as of 18:34, 20 March 2026 (UTC)

Pier Miqueas Barrios (born 1 July 1990) is an Argentine footballer, who plays for Colón. He has played on loan spells for RSC Anderlecht, Gimnasia y Esgrima de Jujuy and Ferro Carril Oeste.

== Career ==
Barrios was born in Córdoba, Argentina. He began his career with Belgrano de Córdoba and made his debut in the 2008 season in the Promocion. The 19-year-old defender left on 10 June 2010 his club Club Atlético Belgrano to join on a one-year deal to RSC Anderlecht.
