= Marcelo Ortiz =

Argentine footballer (born 1994)

Personal information
- Full name: Marcelo Damián Ortiz
- Date of birth: 13 January 1994 (age 32)
- Place of birth: Corrientes, Argentina
- Height: 1.86 m (6 ft 1 in)
- Position: Centre-back

Team information
- Current team: Audax Italiano
- Number: 29

Youth career
- Boca Unidos

Senior career*
Years	Team	Apps	(Gls)
2012–2022	Boca Unidos	111	(0)
2012–2013	→ Comunicaciones (loan)	22	(0)
2017–2019	→ Rosario Central (loan)	9	(0)
2019–2021	→ Atlético Tucumán (loan)	58	(5)
2022–2025	Atlético Tucumán	48	(4)
2024	→ Santa Fe (loan)	40	(2)
2026–	Audax Italiano	1	(0)
- * Club domestic league appearances and goals as of 31 January 2026

Marcelo Damián Ortiz (born 13 January 1994) is an Argentine professional footballer who plays as a centre-back for Chilean club Audax Italiano.

== Career ==
Ortiz started off with Primera B Nacional's Boca Unidos, who loaned him out during the 2012–13 campaign to Comunicaciones of Torneo Argentino B. He made twenty-two appearances for Comunicaciones before returning to his parent club. Boca Unidos subsequently gave Ortiz his professional football debut in December 2013 during a Primera B Nacional home draw over San Martín, having previously been an unused substitute three times between the 2011–12 and 2012–13 seasons. He then made one hundred and ten further appearances in the following years between 2014 and 2017.

On 5 August 2017, Ortiz joined Argentine Primera División side Rosario Central on loan. His Primera División debut arrived on 26 August versus Colón.

In January 2026, Ortiz joined Chilean club Audax Italiano.

== Career statistics ==
As of 19 May 2018.

Club statistics
Club	Season	League			Cup (Note: Includes the Copa Argentina)		League Cup		Continental (Note: Includes the Copa Sudamericana)		Other		Total	
Club	Season	Division	Apps	Goals	Apps	Goals	Apps	Goals	Apps	Goals	Apps	Goals	Apps	Goals
Boca Unidos	2011–12	Primera B Nacional	0	0	0	0	—		—		0	0	0	0
Boca Unidos	2012–13	Primera B Nacional	0	0	0	0	—		—		0	0	0	0
Boca Unidos	2013–14	Primera B Nacional	11	0	1	0	—		—		0	0	12	0
Boca Unidos	2014	Primera B Nacional	10	0	0	0	—		—		0	0	10	0
Boca Unidos	2015	Primera B Nacional	38	0	0	0	—		—		0	0	38	0
Boca Unidos	2016	Primera B Nacional	15	0	0	0	—		—		0	0	15	0
Boca Unidos	2016–17	Primera B Nacional	37	0	0	0	—		—		0	0	37	0
Boca Unidos	2017–18	Primera B Nacional	0	0	0	0	—		—		0	0	0	0
Boca Unidos	Total		111	0	1	0	—		—		0	0	112	0
Comunicaciones (loan)	2012–13	Torneo Argentino B	22	0	0	0	—		—		0	0	22	0
Rosario Central (loan)	2017–18	Primera División	3	0	1	0	—		0	0	0	0	4	0
Career total			136	0	2	0	—		0	0	0	0	138	0

== Honours ==
Rosario Central

- Copa Argentina: 2017–18
