= Luis Daher =

Argentine footballer

Personal information
- Full name: Luis Rodrigo Daher Benítez
- Date of birth: 25 February 1992 (age 34)
- Place of birth: Maipú, Argentina
- Height: 1.72 m (5 ft 8 in)
- Position: Midfielder

Team information
- Current team: Deportivo Maipú

Senior career*
Years	Team	Apps	(Gls)
2011–2013	Godoy Cruz	0	(0)
2013	Brown de Adrogué	0	(0)
2014	Sol de América	7	(0)
2014	Lota Schwager	9	(0)
2015–2017	Independiente Rivadavia	28	(0)
2018–2020	Deportivo Maipú	51	(2)
2021	Huracán Las Heras	30	(2)
2021–2022	Gutiérrez	11	(0)
2022	Huracán Las Heras	11	(0)
2022	Argentino MM	16	(0)
2022–2024	FADEP	–	(–)
2024–	Deportivo Maipú	–	(–)
- * Club domestic league appearances and goals as of 2 September 2024

Luis Rodrigo Daher Benítez (born 25 February 1992) is an Argentine footballer.

== Career ==
He has played for clubs like Paraguay's Sol de América or Chilean side Lota Schwager.

In 2021 and 2022, Daher played for Huracán Las Heras and Gutiérrez. In 2022 and 2023, Daher played for FADEP.

In 2024, Daher rejoined Deportivo Maipú in the Liga Mendocina.
