= Cristian Amarilla =

Argentine footballer

Personal information
- Full name: Cristian Damián Amarilla
- Date of birth: 8 November 1993 (age 33)
- Place of birth: Avellaneda, Argentina
- Height: 1.65 m (5 ft 5 in)
- Position: Centre-forward

Team information
- Current team: Olimpo

Senior career*
Years	Team	Apps	(Gls)
2011–2017	Deportivo Español	137	(23)
2017–2019	Universidad de Concepción	1	(0)
2018	→ Unión San Felipe (loan)	9	(1)
2018–2019	→ Platense (loan)	19	(1)
2019	Estudiantes BA	4	(0)
2020	Brown de Adrogué	1	(0)
2020	Deportes Valdivia	3	(0)
2021–2024	Olimpo	82	(17)
2024	Sol de América	34	(4)
2025	General Caballero (JLM)	7	(0)
2025–	Olimpo	20	(5)
- * Club domestic league appearances and goals as of 16:49, 14 April 2026 (UTC)

Cristian Damián Amarilla (born 8 November 1993) is an Argentine professional footballer who plays as a centre-forward for Club Olimpo.

== Club career ==
Amarilla began his career with Deportivo Español. He featured in Primera C Metropolitana from 2011, scoring five goals in forty-six fixtures up until 2013–14 when the club won promotion to Primera B Metropolitana. Nineteen goals followed in four campaigns in the second tier, which included a hat-trick over Deportivo Riestra in 2015 and ten goals in 2016–17. On 27 July 2017, Amarilla joined Chilean Primera División side Universidad de Concepción. He played twice in 2017, with both appearances coming in games with Unión Española. Amarilla was loaned to Primera B de Chile's Unión San Felipe.

After one goal, versus Deportes Melipilla, across eleven appearances in all competitions in early 2018 for Unión San Felipe, Amarilla returned to Universidad de Concepción who subsequently loaned the forward back out - to Platense of Argentina's Primera B Nacional in June 2018. He scored on his starting league debut in September during a 2–0 victory over Deportivo Morón. Amarilla went back to Argentina, permanently, with Estudiantes on 8 July 2019. He was on the move again in February 2020, as he signed with fellow Primera B Nacional team Brown. He made one appearance before departing in June.

On 22 November 2020, Amarilla returned to Chile, as he signed with Deportes Valdivia. At the end of March 2021, he moved back to his homeland and joined Club Olimpo.

== International career ==
In December 2015, Amarilla received a U23 call-up from Julio Olarticoechea for the 2016 Sait Nagjee Trophy in India.

== Career statistics ==
As of 7 July 2020.

Appearances and goals by club, season and competition
Club	Season	League			Cup		League Cup		Continental		Other		Total	
Club	Season	Division	Apps	Goals	Apps	Goals	Apps	Goals	Apps	Goals	Apps	Goals	Apps	Goals
Deportivo Español	2014	Primera B Metropolitana	17	1	0	0	—		—		0	0	17	1
Deportivo Español	2015	Primera B Metropolitana	25	3	3	0	—		—		0	0	28	3
Deportivo Español	2016	Primera B Metropolitana	15	5	0	0	—		—		0	0	15	5
Deportivo Español	2016–17	Primera B Metropolitana	34	9	0	0	—		—		3 (Note: Appearance(s) in the Primera B Metropolitana play-offs)	1	37	10
Deportivo Español	Total		91	18	3	0	—		—		3	1	97	19
Universidad de Concepción	2017	Primera División	1	0	0	0	—		—		1 (Note: Appearance(s) in the Primera División play-offs)	0	2	0
Universidad de Concepción	2018	Primera División	0	0	0	0	—		1 (Note: Appearance(s) in the Copa Libertadores)	0	0	0	1	0
Universidad de Concepción	2019	Primera División	0	0	0	0	—		0	0	0	0	0	0
Universidad de Concepción	Total		1	0	0	0	—		1	0	1	0	3	0
Unión San Felipe (loan)	2018	Primera B	9	1	2	0	—		—		0	0	11	1
Platense (loan)	2018–19	Primera B Nacional	19	1	3	0	—		—		0	0	22	1
Estudiantes	2019–20	Primera B Nacional	4	0	1	0	—		—		0	0	5	0
Brown	2019–20	Primera B Nacional	1	0	0	0	—		—		0	0	1	0
Career total			125	20	10	0	—		0	0	4	1	139	21
