= Juan Amieva =

Argentine footballer

Personal information
- Full name: Juan Martín Amieva
- Date of birth: 27 September 1988 (age 38)
- Place of birth: San Luis, Argentina
- Height: 1.80 m (5 ft 11 in)
- Position: Forward

Team information
- Current team: FADEP
- Number: 9

Senior career*
Years	Team	Apps	(Gls)
2006–2008	Defensores de Belgrano	21	(2)
2009–2010	KSC Lokeren	0	(0)
2010	Deportes Antofagasta	17	(2)
2011–2012	Huracán CR	14	(1)
2012–2014	Huracán SR	37	(14)
2013–2014	→ Barracas Central (loan)	10	(0)
2015	Alianza Cutral Có	21	(8)
2016–2017	Gimnasia y Tiro	38	(22)
2017–2018	Gimnasia de Mendoza	10	(2)
2018–2020	Sportivo Estudiantes	24	(9)
2019	→ Mushuc Runa (loan)	9	(5)
2020–2021	Independiente Rivadavia	6	(1)
2021	Gimnasia de Jujuy	4	(0)
2021	Cipolletti	13	(1)
2022	Sansinena	28	(15)
2023	Deportes Recoleta	24	(1)
2023–	FADEP	–	(–)
- * Club domestic league appearances and goals as of 27 December 2023

Juan Martín Amieva (born 27 September 1988) is an Argentine footballer who plays as a forward for FADEP.

== Career ==
He played for Mushuc Runa in Ecuador.

In 2023, he played for Deportes Recoleta in the Primera B de Chile. In the same year, he returned to Argentina to play for FADEP from Mendoza.
