= Andrés Lamas (footballer) =

Uruguayan footballer (born 1984)

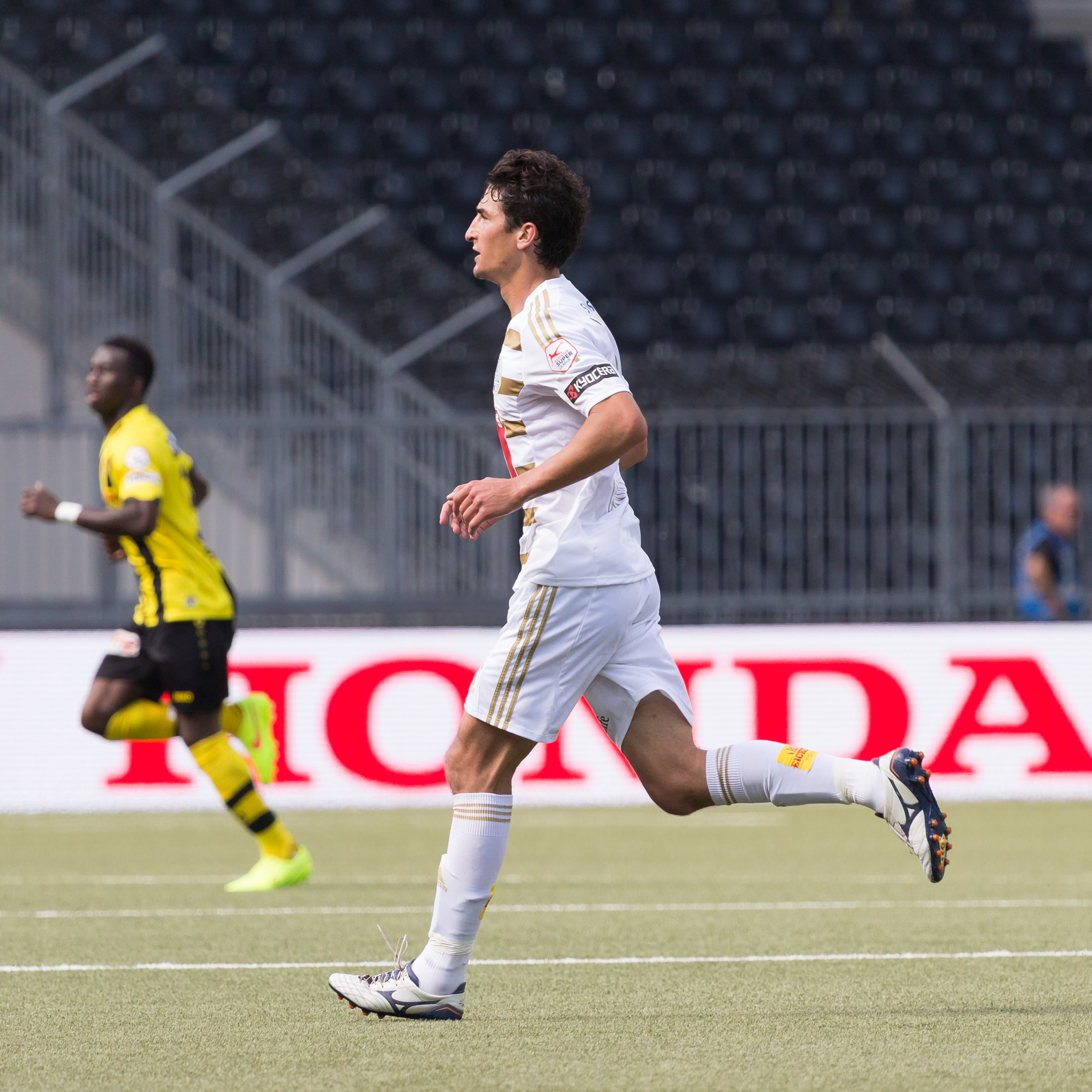

Personal information
- Full name: Andrés Lamas Bervejillo
- Date of birth: 16 January 1984 (age 42)
- Place of birth: Montevideo, Uruguay
- Height: 1.88 m (6 ft 2 in)
- Position: Centre back

Senior career*
Years	Team	Apps	(Gls)
2004–2007	Defensor	37	(5)
2007–2008	Ankaragücü	13	(0)
2008–2012	Recreativo	37	(4)
2009–2010	→ Las Palmas (loan)	22	(4)
2013	Alcorcón	0	(0)
2013–2014	Liverpool Montevideo	12	(1)
2014	Independiente Valle	16	(3)
2014	Luzern	4	(0)
2015	Barcelona SC	7	(1)
2016–2018	Defensor	47	(2)
2018–2019	Atlético Tucumán	17	(0)
2020–2021	Defensor	25	(2)
2022–2023	Cerro	4	(1)
- * Club domestic league appearances and goals as of 4 September 2024

Andrés Lamas Bervejillo (born 16 January 1984) is an Uruguayan professional footballer who played as a centre back.

== Football career ==
Born in Montevideo, Lamas started playing professionally with local Defensor Sporting Club, remaining three seasons with the side. In 2007, he joined MKE Ankaragücü in Turkey, helping his team to the eight place in the Süper Lig but being used mostly as a backup.

Afterwards, Lamas moved to Spain and signed for Recreativo de Huelva. He made his La Liga debut on 28 September 2008, playing six minutes in a 0–1 away loss against Andalusia neighbours UD Almería, and again was played sparingly throughout the campaign, with his club eventually being relegated.

On 22 July 2009, Lamas moved to UD Las Palmas in the second division, in a season-long loan. He subsequently returned to Recre, continuing to compete in the Spanish second level but also being sidelined for almost two years after suffering an anterior cruciate ligament injury.
