= Kevin Isa Luna =

Argentine footballer (born 2001)

Personal information
- Full name: Kevin Amir Isa Luna
- Date of birth: 18 April 2001 (age 25)
- Place of birth: San Miguel de Tucumán, Argentina
- Height: 1.80 m (5 ft 11 in)
- Position: Winger

Team information
- Current team: Central Norte

Youth career
- Atlético Tucumán

Senior career*
Years	Team	Apps	(Gls)
2019–2025	Atlético Tucumán	12	(3)
2023	→ Celaya (loan)	4	(0)
2024	→ Mitre (SdE) (loan)	26	(2)
2025–2026	Sportivo Ameliano	8	(0)
2026–	Central Norte	4	(0)
- * Club domestic league appearances and goals as of 17:32, 24 April 2026 (UTC)

Kevin Amir Isa Luna (born 18 April 2001) is an Argentine professional footballer who plays as a winger for Central Norte.

== Career ==
Isa started his career in the system of Atlético Tucumán. He was picked on the substitutes bench for a Primera División match with Aldosivi on 31 March 2019 by manager Ricardo Zielinski, who subsequently selected the winger to come on after eighty-five minutes – in place of David Barbona during a 1–0 home win.

== Personal life ==
Isa is of Lebanese descent through his paternal grandfather, Abraham Isa.

== Career statistics ==
As of 31 March 2019.

Appearances and goals by club, season and competition
Club	Season	League			Cup		Continental		Other		Total	
Club	Season	Division	Apps	Goals	Apps	Goals	Apps	Goals	Apps	Goals	Apps	Goals
Atlético Tucumán	2018–19	Primera División	1	0	0	0	—		0	0	1	0
Career total			1	0	0	0	—		0	0	1	0
