= Hugo Silva (footballer, born 1988) =

Argentine footballer and manager

Personal information
- Full name: Hugo Orlando Silva
- Date of birth: 3 June 1988 (age 38)
- Place of birth: San Miguel, Argentina
- Position: Midfielder

Team information
- Current team: San Lorenzo Pilar (manager)

Senior career*
Years	Team	Apps	(Gls)
2007–2014	Fénix	195	(7)
2014	Deportivo Español	12	(0)
2015–2017	Luján	60	(1)
2018	Flecha Azul		

Managerial career
- 2019–: San Lorenzo Pilar
- * Club domestic league appearances and goals

Hugo Orlando Silva (born 3 June 1988) is an Argentine former footballer who played as a midfielder. He is currently the manager of San Lorenzo Pilar.

== Club career ==
Silva's career started in 2007 with Fénix of Primera C Metropolitana. After four seasons in Primera C, the club were relegated to Primera D Metropolitana for the 2011–12 season. Fénix subsequently won Primera D as Silva scored one goal in twenty-six appearances. Two seasons later, in 2012–13, Fénix were promoted to Primera B Metropolitana. Silva made his professional debut on 12 August 2013 in a 2–1 defeat to Temperley. In February 2014, Silva scored the first two professional goals of his career in a win over Temperley. Ahead of 2014, Silva made the move to newly promoted Primera B Metropolitana team Deportivo Español.

He featured twelve times as Deportivo Español finished 6th in Zone 1. In January 2015, Silva signed for Primera C's Luján. One goal in sixty games followed between 2015 and 2017 before he terminated his contract with Luján in June 2017. In January 2018, Silva joined Torneo Federación Norte regional side Flecha Azul. He scored on his debut for Flecha Azul in a 2–2 draw with Sociedad Atlética Pabellón Argentino.

== Management career ==
In February 2019, Silva became manager of Liga Escobarense de Fútbol outfit San Lorenzo Pilar.

== Honours ==
Fénix

- Primera D Metropolitana: 2011–12
