= Hugo Silva (footballer, born 1992) =

Argentine footballer (born 1992)

Personal information
- Full name: Hugo Ezequiel Silva
- Date of birth: 4 February 1992 (age 34)
- Place of birth: Quilmes, Argentina
- Height: 1.77 m (5 ft 10 in)
- Position: Right-back

Team information
- Current team: Estudiantes BA

Youth career
- Racing Club

Senior career*
Years	Team	Apps	(Gls)
2011–2014	Racing Club	0	(0)
2014–2015	Atlanta	44	(1)
2016–2020	Defensa y Justicia	30	(0)
2018	→ Mitre (loan)	11	(0)
2019–2020	→ Estudiantes de Buenos Aires (loan)	18	(1)
2020–2021	Godoy Cruz	9	(1)
2021	Defensa y Justicia	12	(1)
2023	Royal Pari	24	(1)
2024	Al-Quwa Al-Jawiya		
2024–	Estudiantes BA	21	(0)
- * Club domestic league appearances and goals as of 16:05, 6 August 2025 (UTC)

Hugo Ezequiel Silva (born 4 February 1992) is an Argentine professional footballer who plays as a right-back for Estudiantes BA.

== Career ==
Silva's first club were Argentine Primera División side Racing Club. He appeared on the substitutes bench for the first-team in March 2011 but went unused in a 4–1 defeat to Lanús. Later that year, on 30 November, he made his professional debut in a Copa Argentina win against El Porvenir. He featured again in the next round vs. Patronato, which Racing Club also won as they went onto finish as runners-up. In July 2014, Silva joined Atlanta of Primera B Metropolitana. He made his career league debut on 13 September during a 1–0 defeat to Tristán Suárez. One goal in forty-five games followed across 2014 and 2015.

In January 2016, Silva signed for Argentine Primera División team Defensa y Justicia. His first appearance in the top-flight arrived on 4 March in an away win against Argentinos Juniors. He went onto make twenty-eight appearances in three seasons with the club. In January 2018, Silva agreed to join Mitre in Primera B Nacional on loan. Silva had another loan spell out in July 2019, signing for Estudiantes. Across both spells, the defender appeared thirty-four times and scored twice. In August 2020, Silva joined Godoy Cruz In July 2021, Silva joined Defensa y Justicia .

== Career statistics ==
As of 2 September 2020.

Club statistics
Club	Season	League			Cup		League Cup		Continental		Other		Total	
Club	Season	Division	Apps	Goals	Apps	Goals	Apps	Goals	Apps	Goals	Apps	Goals	Apps	Goals
Racing Club	2010–11	Primera División	0	0	0	0	—		—		0	0	0	0
Racing Club	2011–12	Primera División	0	0	2	0	—		—		0	0	2	0
Racing Club	2012–13	Primera División	0	0	0	0	—		0	0	0	0	0	0
Racing Club	2013–14	Primera División	0	0	0	0	—		0	0	0	0	0	0
Racing Club	Total		0	0	2	0	—		0	0	0	0	2	0
Atlanta	2014	Primera B Metropolitana	11	0	0	0	—		—		0	0	11	0
Atlanta	2015	Primera B Metropolitana	33	1	4	0	—		—		1 (Note: Appearance(s) in the Primera B Metropolitana play-offs)	0	38	1
Atlanta	Total		44	1	4	0	—		—		1	0	49	1
Defensa y Justicia	2016	Primera División	3	0	0	0	—		—		0	0	3	0
Defensa y Justicia	2016–17	Primera División	20	0	2	0	—		1 (Note: Appearance(s) in the Copa Sudamericana)	0	0	0	23	0
Defensa y Justicia	2017–18	Primera División	5	0	1	0	—		0	0	0	0	6	0
Defensa y Justicia	2018–19	Primera División	2	0	0	0	0	0	1	0	0	0	3	0
Defensa y Justicia	2019–20	Primera División	0	0	0	0	0	0	0	0	0	0	0	0
Defensa y Justicia	Total		30	0	3	0	0	0	2	0	0	0	35	0
Mitre (loan)	2017–18	Primera B Nacional	11	0	1	0	—		—		0	0	12	0
Estudiantes (loan)	2019–20	Primera B Nacional	18	1	4	1	—		—		0	0	22	2
Godoy Cruz	2020–21	Primera División	0	0	0	0	0	0	—		0	0	0	0
Career total			103	2	14	1	0	0	2	0	1	0	120	3
