= Cristian Vega (footballer, born 1993) =

Argentine footballer

Personal information
- Full name: Cristian Orlando Vega
- Date of birth: 17 September 1993 (age 33)
- Place of birth: Santiago del Estero, Argentina
- Height: 1.71 m (5 ft 7 in)
- Position: Midfielder

Team information
- Current team: Ciudad de Bolívar

Youth career
- Central Córdoba SdE

Senior career*
Years	Team	Apps	(Gls)
2013–2022	Central Córdoba SdE	167	(7)
2022–2024	Colón	47	(1)
2024–2026	Central Córdoba SdE	8	(0)
2026–	Ciudad de Bolívar	0	(0)
- * Club domestic league appearances and goals as of 17:33, 12 March 2026 (UTC)

Cristian Orlando Vega (born 17 September 1993) is an Argentine professional footballer who plays as a midfielder for Ciudad de Bolívar in the Primera Nacional of Argentina.

== Career ==
Vega started his career with Central Córdoba of Torneo Argentino A. He made five appearances in his debut campaign, including his debut against Central Norte on 25 January 2013 as the club were eliminated in the second round of the promotion play-offs. Two seasons later, in 2014, Vega made eleven appearances as they won promotion to Primera B Nacional; his professional bow subsequently arrived in July 2015 against Villa Dálmine. Vega scored his first senior goal on 13 October 2016 as Central Córdoba beat Los Andes 1–0.

On 26 January 2022, Vega joined Colón on a deal until the end of 2024.

On 23 January 2026, joined Ciudad de Bolívar in the Primera Nacional.

== Career statistics ==
As of 6 December 2018.

Club statistics
Club	Season	League			Cup (Note: Includes the Copa Argentina)		League Cup		Continental		Other		Total	
Club	Season	Division	Apps	Goals	Apps	Goals	Apps	Goals	Apps	Goals	Apps	Goals	Apps	Goals
Central Córdoba	2012–13	Torneo Argentino A	5	0	0	0	—		—		0	0	5	0
Central Córdoba	2013–14	Torneo Argentino A	13	0	2	0	—		—		0	0	15	0
Central Córdoba	2014	Torneo Federal A	11	0	0	0	—		—		0	0	11	0
Central Córdoba	2015	Primera B Nacional	11	0	0	0	—		—		0	0	11	0
Central Córdoba	2016	Primera B Nacional	9	0	0	0	—		—		0	0	9	0
Central Córdoba	2016–17	Primera B Nacional	10	1	1	0	—		—		0	0	11	1
Central Córdoba	2017–18	Torneo Federal A	19	0	3	0	—		—		0	0	22	0
Central Córdoba	2018–19	Primera B Nacional	9	1	4	0	—		—		0	0	13	1
Career total			87	2	10	0	—		—		0	0	97	2

== Honours ==
Central Córdoba

- Torneo Federal A: 2017–18
- Copa Argentina: 2024
