= Antonio Medina (footballer) =

Argentine footballer (born 1984)

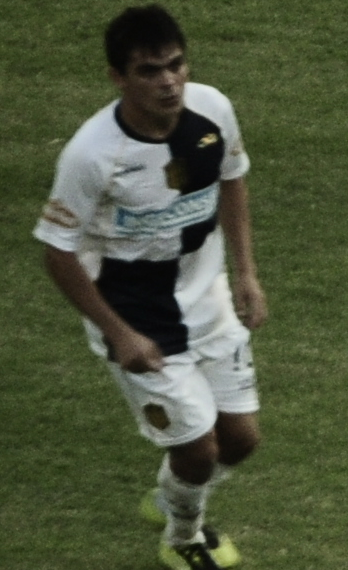
- Antonio Medina RC

Personal information
- Full name: Antonio César Medina
- Date of birth: 18 December 1984 (age 41)
- Place of birth: Resistencia, Argentina
- Height: 1.73 m (5 ft 8 in)
- Position: Midfielder

Team information
- Current team: Boca Unidos

Senior career*
Years	Team	Apps	(Gls)
2002–2004	Chaco For Ever		
2004–2005	Textil Mandiyú	4	(0)
2005–2007	Chaco For Ever		
2007–2010	Boca Unidos	62	(16)
2010–2014	Rosario Central	134	(18)
2014–2016	Gimnasia LP	32	(4)
2016–2018	Aldosivi	46	(5)
2018–	Boca Unidos	111	(16)
- * Club domestic league appearances and goals as of 17:22, 30 March 2026 (UTC)

Antonio César Medina (born 18 December 1984) is an Argentine professional footballer who plays as a midfielder for Boca Unidos.

== Career ==
Chaco For Ever became Medina's first club in 2002; he remained with them for two years until he left to join Textil Mandiyú in 2004, but returned to Chaco For Ever soon after in 2005. After two more years with Chaco For Ever, Medina joined Torneo Argentino A side Boca Unidos in 2007. Three years later, he departed Boca Unidos, after winning the 2008–09 Torneo Argentino A and scoring 16 goals in his last three seasons with them, to sign for Primera B Nacional club Rosario Central. He made his debut on 11 September 2010 against Atlético de Rafaela. On 9 November, Medina scored his first goal for them in a 1–0 win versus Instituto.

He scored 5 goals in 30 games in 2012–13 as Rosario Central won promotion into the 2013–14 Argentine Primera División. He departed in 2014 after participating in 134 league matches for Rosario Central and scoring 18 goals. 2014 saw Medina join Argentine Primera División side Gimnasia y Esgrima. He played 27 times in his first season for Gimnasia, and he also scored four goals, including two in one match on 11 April 2015 against future team Aldosivi. He joined Aldosivi in July 2016 after two seasons with Gimnasia, he played his first game for Aldosivi on 30 August against Colón. Two goals and twenty-six appearances followed for him.

In December 2018, having terminated his contract with Aldosivi, Medina completed a return to Boca Unidos; now of Torneo Federal A.

== Career statistics ==
As of 26 December 2018.

Club statistics
Club	Season	League			Cup (Note: Includes the Copa Argentina)		League Cup		Continental		Other		Total	
Club	Season	Division	Apps	Goals	Apps	Goals	Apps	Goals	Apps	Goals	Apps	Goals	Apps	Goals
Aldosivi	2016–17	Primera División	26	2	0	0	—		—		0	0	26	2
Aldosivi	2017–18	Primera B Nacional	18	3	1	0	—		—		1 (Note: One appearance in the 2017–18 Primera B Nacional play-offs)	0	20	3
Aldosivi	2018–19	Primera División	2	0	1	0	—		—		0	0	3	0
Aldosivi	Total		46	5	2	0	—		—		1	0	49	5
Boca Unidos	2018–19	Torneo Federal A	0	0	0	0	—		—		0	0	0	0
Career total			46	5	2	0	—		—		1	0	49	5

== Honours ==
Boca Unidos

- Torneo Argentino A: 2008–09

Rosario Central

- Primera B Nacional: 2012–13

Aldosivi

- Primera B Nacional: 2017–18
