= Dylan Gissi =

Swiss footballer (born 1991)

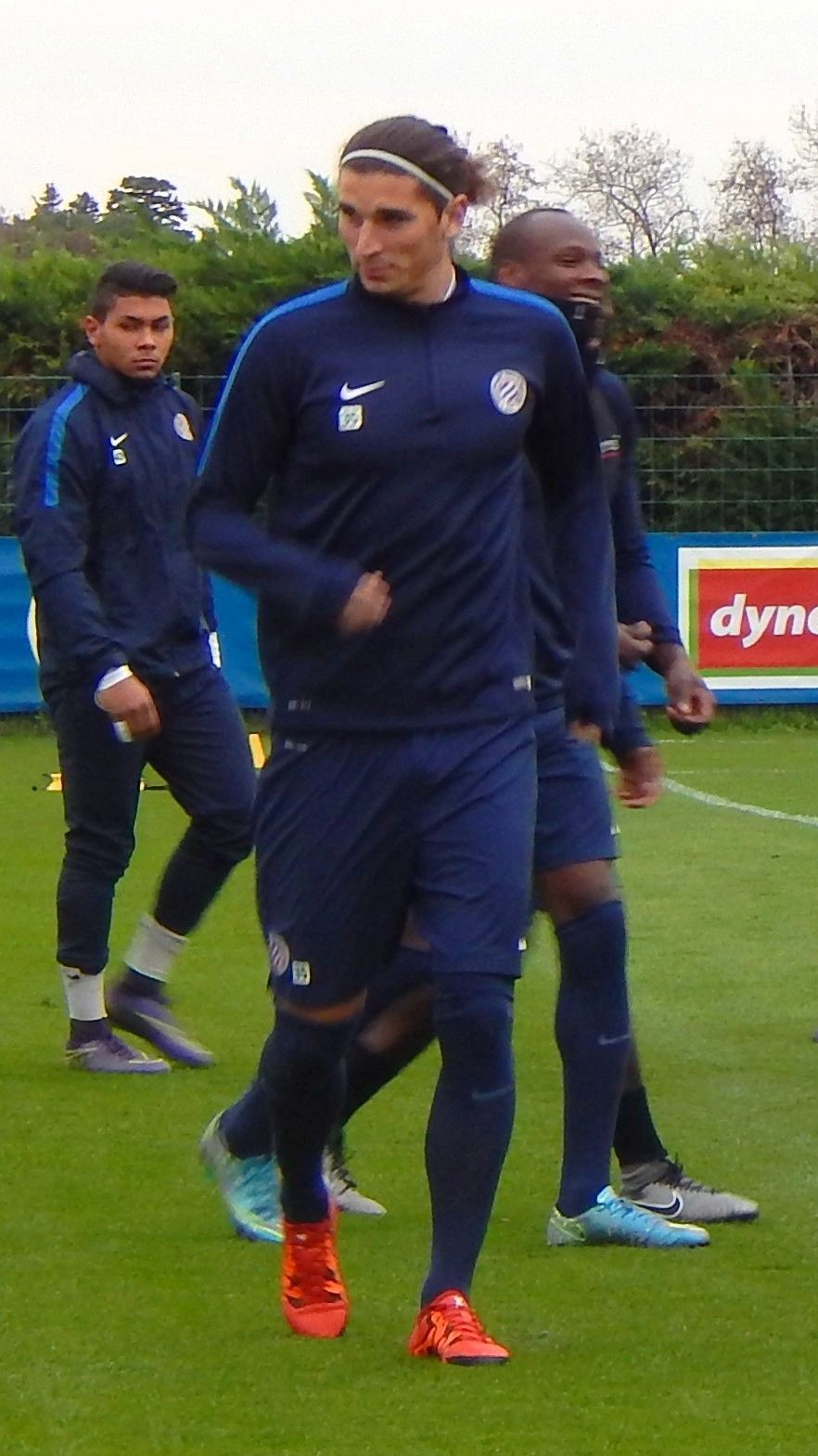
- Gissi in 2025

Personal information
- Date of birth: 27 April 1991 (age 35)
- Place of birth: Geneva, Switzerland
- Height: 1.92 m (6 ft 4 in)
- Position: Centre-back

Team information
- Current team: Nueva Chicago

Youth career
- 2002–2004: Saint-Paul
- 2004–2005: Etoile Carouge
- 2005–2006: FC Basel
- 2006–2008: Sarandí
- 2008–2010: Neuchâtel Xamax
- 2009: Atlético Madrid
- 2010: Estudiantes

Senior career*
Years	Team	Apps	(Gls)
2011–2013	Estudiantes	1	(0)
2013–2014	Olimpo	23	(3)
2014–2016	Montpellier	1	(0)
2014–2016	Montpellier B	34	(4)
2016–2017	Rosario Central	5	(0)
2017–2018	Defensa y Justicia	17	(0)
2019	Patronato	9	(0)
2019–2020	Tucumán	7	(0)
2020–2021	Patronato	14	(1)
2021–2022	Unión	8	(0)
2022–2024	Banfield	19	(0)
2023	→ Defensa y Justicia (loan)	3	(0)
2024–2025	Atlanta	30	(2)
2025	Arsenal Sarandí	6	(0)
2025–2026	River Plate Montevideo	6	(2)
2026–	Nueva Chicago	2	(0)

International career
	Switzerland U15 B	1	(0)
2012	Switzerland U21	1	(0)
- * Club domestic league appearances and goals as of 17:01, 13 April 2026 (UTC)

Dylan Gissi (born 27 April 1991) is a Swiss professional footballer who plays as a centre-back for Argentine club Nueva Chicago.

== Club career ==
Gissi started his career with Estudiantes in the Primera División in 2010, and then went on loan to Olimpo in July 2013.

== Personal life ==
Born in Switzerland, Gissi is of Argentine and Italian descent. He is the older brother of current fellow footballer Kevin Gissi.
