= 2025 Torneo Federal A =

XIII Torneo Federal A
- Season: 2025
- Champions: Ciudad de Bolivar (1st title)
- Promoted: Ciudad de Bolivar; Atlético de Rafaela
- Relegated: Gutiérrez; Crucero del Norte; Ben Hur; Estudiantes (SL)
- Matches: 551
- Goals: 1,148 (2.08 per match)
- Biggest home win: San Martín (F) 5-0 Sarmiento (R) (May 10); Douglas Haig 5–0 Olimpo (Nov 9)
- Biggest away win: Boca Unidos 0-3 San Martín (F) (March 23)
- Highest scoring: Gutiérrez 5-4 San Martín (M) (March 29)
- All statistics correct as of December 14, 2025.

The 2025 Argentine Torneo Federal A was the thirteenth season of the Torneo Federal A, the regionalised third tier of the Argentine football league system. The tournament is reserved for teams indirectly affiliated to the Asociación del Fútbol Argentino (AFA), while teams affiliated to AFA have to play the Primera B Metropolitana, which is the other third-tier competition. The competition was contested by 32 of the 36 teams that took part in the 2024 season, with two teams relegated from Primera Nacional and four teams promoted from Torneo Regional Federal Amateur; also, Deportivo Camioneros declined to participate, losing the place in the category. Two teams were promoted to Primera Nacional and four teams were relegated to Torneo Regional Federal Amateur. The season began on 16 March and ended on 1 December 2024.

== Format ==
=== First stage ===
The thirty-eight teams were divided into four zones, two with ten teams and two with nine teams in each zone and it was played in a round-robin tournament whereby each team played each one of the other teams two times. The teams placed 1st to 5th from each zone with ten teams, and the teams placed 1st to 4th from each zone with nine teams qualified for the championship stages. The remaining twenty teams qualify for the revalida stage.

=== Championship stages ===
==== Second stage ====
The eighteen teams were divided into two zones with nine teams each and it was played in a round-robin tournament whereby each team played each one of the other teams one time. The teams placed 1st to 4th qualified for the third stage. The remaining ten teams qualified for the second phase of the revalida stage.

==== Third stage ====
The eight teams play a two-legged tie and the winners advance to the fourth stage. The losing teams qualified for the second phase of the revalida stage.

==== Fourth stage ====
The four teams play a two-legged tie and the winners advance to the fifth stage. The losing teams qualified for the third phase of the revalida stage.

==== Fifth stage ====
Both tie winners will play a final match on neutral ground to decide the champion and first promoted team to Primera Nacional. The losing team qualified for the third phase of the revalida stage.

=== Revalida stages ===
The revalida stage is divided in several phases: First, the twenty teams that did not qualify for the championship stages were divided into two zones and it was played in a round-robin tournament whereby each team played each one of the other teams one time. The teams placed 1st to 6th from each zone advance too the second phase.

==== Second phase ====
The twelve teams from the first phase of revalida stage and the fourteen teams from the second and third stages of championship stages play a two-legged tie and the winners advance to the third phase.

==== Third to sixth phase ====
The thirteen teams from the second phase, the losing teams from the fourth and fifth stage of championship stages, play a torneo reducido, with teams seeded according to their previous results; playing a two-legged tie over the phases. The winner of the sixth phase is promoted to Primera Nacional.

=== Relegation ===
After the first phase of the revalida stage a table was drawn up with the points obtained in the first stage and the first phase of the revalida stage and the bottom two teams of each two zones were relegated to the Torneo Regional Federal Amateur, giving a total of four teams relegated.

== Club information ==
Locations of the 2025 season teams.
Yellow: Zone A; Blue: Zone B;
Green: Zone C; Red: Zone D.

=== Zone A ===
Team	City	Stadium
Cipolletti	Cipolletti	La Visera de Cemento
Círculo Deportivo	Cdte. Nicanor Otamendi	Guillermo Trama
Deportivo Rincón	Rincón de Los Sauces	Elías Moisés Gómez
Germinal	Rawson	El Fortín
Guillermo Brown	Puerto Madryn	Raul Conti
Kimberley	Mar del Plata	José Alberto Valle
Olimpo	Bahía Blanca	Roberto Natalio Carminatti
Santamarina	Tandil	Municipal General San Martín
Sol de Mayo	Viedma	Sol de Mayo
Villa Mitre	Bahía Blanca	El Fortín

=== Zone B ===
Team	City	Stadium
Argentino	Monte Maíz	Modesto Marrone
Atenas	Río Cuarto	9 de Julio
Ciudad de Bolivar	San Carlos de Bolívar	Municipal Eva Perón
Costa Brava	General Pico	Nuevo Pacaembú
Estudiantes	San Luis	Héctor Odicino – Pedro Benoza
Gutiérrez	General Gutiérrez	General Gutiérrez
Huracán Las Heras	Las Heras	General San Martín
Juventud Unida Universitario	San Luis	Mario Diez
San Martín	San Martín	Libertador General San Martín

=== Zone C ===
Team	City	Stadium
9 de Julio	Rafaela	Germán Solterman
Ben Hur	Rafaela	Parque Barrio Ilolay
Defensores de Belgrano	Villa Ramallo	Salomón Boeseldín
Douglas Haig	Pergamino	Miguel Morales
El Linqueño	Lincoln	Leonardo Costa
Gimnasia y Esgrima	Chivilcoy	José María Paz
Gimnasia y Esgrima	Concepción del Uruguay	Manuel y Ramón Núñez
Independiente	Chivilcoy	Raúl Orlando Lungarzo
Sportivo Belgrano	San Francisco	Oscar Boero
Sportivo Las Parejas	Las Parejas	Fortaleza del Lobo

=== Zone D ===
Team	City	Stadium
Atlético de Rafaela	Rafaela	Nuevo Monumental
Bartolomé Mitre	Posadas	Ernesto Tito Cucchiaroni
Boca Unidos	Corrientes	José Antonio Romero Feris
Crucero del Norte	Garupá	Andrés Guacurarí
Juventud Antoniana	Salta	Fray Honorato Pistoia
San Martín	Formosa	17 De Octubre
Sarmiento	La Banda	Ciudad de La Banda
Sarmiento	Resistencia	Centenario
Sol de América	Formosa	Sol de América

== First stage ==
=== Zone A ===
Pos	Team	Pld	W	D	L	GF	GA	GD	Pts	Qualification or Relegation
1	Cipolletti	18	13	1	4	31	13	+18	40	Advance to Championship Stages
2	Villa Mitre	18	10	5	3	22	9	+13	35	Advance to Championship Stages
3	Olimpo	18	7	5	6	19	15	+4	26	Advance to Championship Stages
4	Kimberley	18	7	5	6	17	13	+4	26	Advance to Championship Stages
5	Deportivo Rincón	18	8	2	8	22	20	+2	26	Advance to Championship Stages
6	Círculo Deportivo	18	7	2	9	17	21	−4	23	Advance to Revalida Stages
7	Guillermo Brown	18	6	3	9	19	29	−10	21	Advance to Revalida Stages
8	Santamarina	18	4	8	6	18	22	−4	20	Advance to Revalida Stages
9	Sol de Mayo	18	4	5	9	16	27	−11	17	Advance to Revalida Stages
10	Germinal	18	4	4	10	16	28	−12	16	Advance to Revalida Stages

Source: AFA
Rules for classification: 1) points; 2) goal difference; 3) Head-to-head points; 4) goals scored; 5) away goals scored; 6) draw of lots.

==== Results ====
Home \ Away	CIP	CIR	DRI	GER	GBR	KIM	OLI	RSA	SOL	VMI
Cipolletti		2–0	3–0	3–1	4–0	0–2	2–1	3–0	1–0	1–1
Círculo Deportivo	1–2		2–1	0–1	0–0	0–1	0–1	2–2	1–0	1–0
Deportivo Rincón	1–0	1–0		2–0	3–4	2–2	1–0	2–0	2–0	0–2
Germinal	0–1	2–5	0–3		1–2	1–2	0–1	1–1	3–1	1–1
Guillermo Brown	0–1	0–1	1–0	1–2		1–0	0–1	1–4	3–1	2–1
Kimberley	1–0	0–1	0–1	0–0	1–1		0–1	1–1	3–0	0–0
Olimpo	1–2	1–2	2–1	1–2	4–0	2–1		1–1	1–1	0–0
Santamarina	1–2	2–0	1–0	1–0	2–2	0–1	1–1		0–1	1–1
Sol de Mayo	3–2	4–1	2–2	1–1	1–0	1–2	0–0	0–0		0–3
Villa Mitre	0–2	1–0	1–0	2–0	2–1	1–0	1–0	3–0	2–0	

Legend: Blue = home team win; Yellow = draw; Red = away team win.

=== Zone B ===
Pos	Team	Pld	W	D	L	GF	GA	GD	Pts	Qualification or Relegation
1	Ciudad de Bolivar	16	9	4	3	24	9	+15	31	Advance to Championship Stages
2	Costa Brava	16	8	6	2	17	7	+10	30	Advance to Championship Stages
3	Atenas (RC)	16	8	1	7	17	14	+3	25	Advance to Championship Stages
4	Argentino (MM)	16	6	5	5	15	16	−1	23	Advance to Championship Stages
5	San Martín (M)	16	6	3	7	19	19	0	21	Advance to Revalida Stages
6	Huracán Las Heras	16	6	3	7	15	20	−5	21	Advance to Revalida Stages
7	Juventud Unida Universitario	16	4	8	4	14	13	+1	20	Advance to Revalida Stages
8	Estudiantes (SL)	16	4	6	6	13	14	−1	18	Advance to Revalida Stages
9	Gutiérrez	16	2	2	12	12	34	−22	8	Advance to Revalida Stages

Source: AFA
Rules for classification: 1) points; 2) goal difference; 3) Head-to-head points; 4) goals scored; 5) away goals scored; 6) draw of lots.

==== Results ====
Home \ Away	ARG	ATE	CIU	CBR	ESL	GUT	HLH	JUU	SMA
Argentino (MM)		3–0	1–0	0–2	1–1	1–0	1–0	2–1	0–1
Atenas (RC)	0–0		0–1	1–0	1–0	4–1	1–2	1–0	0–1
Ciudad de Bolivar	4–1	2–0		0–0	2–0	4–0	3–1	1–0	2–1
Costa Brava	3–0	1–0	1–1		1–0	3–0	1–0	1–1	1–0
Estudiantes (SL)	0–0	0–2	0–0	2–0		3–1	1–1	1–1	0–1
Gutiérrez	0–2	1–2	1–1	0–1	1–3		0–1	0–0	5–4
Huracán Las Heras	2–1	0–2	2–1	1–1	1–0	1–2		1–1	2–0
Juventud Unida Universitario	1–1	1–0	0–2	1–1	1–1	1–0	1–0		3–0
San Martín (M)	1–1	1–3	1–0	0–0	0–1	3–0	4–0	1–1	

Updated to match(es) played on unknown. Source:
Legend: Blue = home team win; Yellow = draw; Red = away team win.

=== Zone C ===
Pos	Team	Pld	W	D	L	GF	GA	GD	Pts	Qualification or Relegation
1	Gimnasia y Esgrima (Ch)	18	7	9	2	17	14	+3	30	Advance to Championship Stages
2	Douglas Haig	18	7	8	3	18	12	+6	29	Advance to Championship Stages
3	Sportivo Belgrano	18	7	6	5	19	12	+7	27	Advance to Championship Stages
4	Independiente (Ch)	18	6	8	4	16	13	+3	26	Advance to Championship Stages
5	9 de Julio (R)	18	7	4	7	20	20	0	25 (Note: The match between Ben Hur and 9 de Julio (R) in the round 18 of the First stage was awarded as a 1–0 win to 9 de Julio (R) as a result of Ben Hur supporters making incidents in the game. Originally the match was suspended in the second half.)	Advance to Championship Stages
6	Sportivo Las Parejas	18	5	7	6	20	19	+1	22	Advance to Revalida Stages
7	Defensores de Belgrano (VR)	18	4	8	6	9	14	−5	20	Advance to Revalida Stages
8	Gimnasia y Esgrima (CdU)	18	5	5	8	14	20	−6	20	Advance to Revalida Stages
9	El Linqueño	18	4	7	7	16	20	−4	19	Advance to Revalida Stages
10	Ben Hur	18	4	6	8	15	20	−5	18	Advance to Revalida Stages

Source: AFA
Rules for classification: 1) points; 2) goal difference; 3) Head-to-head points; 4) goals scored; 5) away goals scored; 6) draw of lots.

==== Results ====
Home \ Away	9JU	BEN	DEF	DOU	ELI	GCH	GYE	ICH	SPB	SLP
9 de Julio (R)		2–0	1–1	0–1	1–1	2–0	2–0	0–2	3–1	4–4
Ben Hur	0–1 (Note: The match between Ben Hur and 9 de Julio (R) in the round 18 of the First stage was awarded as a 1–0 win to 9 de Julio (R) as a result of Ben Hur supporters making incidents in the game. Originally the match was suspended in the second half.)		2–0	3–2	2–0	0–0	2–0	0–0	1–1	1–1
Defensores de Belgrano (VR)	0–1	1–0		1–1	1–0	0–1	1–1	0–0	2–1	0–2
Douglas Haig	0–1	2–2	2–0		1–0	0–0	1–0	1–1	0–1	1–0
El Linqueño	1–1	1–0	0–0	2–3		0–0	0–1	3–1	1–0	0–0
Gimnasia y Esgrima (Ch)	2–1	2–1	2–1	1–3	1–1		1–0	1–0	2–1	2–2
Gimnasia y Esgrima (CdU)	1–0	2–0	0–0	0–0	0–2	2–2		3–0	0–0	3–0
Independiente (Ch)	2–0	2–1	0–0	0–0	2–2	0–0	3–0		1–2	1–0
Sportivo Belgrano	1–0	0–0	0–0	0–0	3–1	0–0	4–0	0–0		3–0
Sportivo Las Parejas	3–0	3–0	0–0	0–0	3–1	0–0	2–1	0–1	0–1	

Legend: Blue = home team win; Yellow = draw; Red = away team win.

=== Zone D ===
Pos	Team	Pld	W	D	L	GF	GA	GD	Pts	Qualification or Relegation
1	Sarmiento (LB)	16	10	2	4	21	11	+10	32	Advance to Championship Stages
2	San Martín (F)	16	8	7	1	29	9	+20	31	Advance to Championship Stages
3	Atlético de Rafaela	16	7	5	4	19	15	+4	26	Advance to Championship Stages
4	Juventud Antoniana	16	6	5	5	19	15	+4	23	Advance to Championship Stages
5	Bartolomé Mitre (P)	16	5	6	5	15	14	+1	21	Advance to Revalida Stages
6	Sol de América (F)	16	5	5	6	21	19	+2	20	Advance to Revalida Stages
7	Sarmiento (R)	16	4	6	6	12	22	−10	18	Advance to Revalida Stages
8	Boca Unidos	16	2	6	8	16	27	−11	12	Advance to Revalida Stages
9	Crucero del Norte	16	2	4	10	10	30	−20	10	Advance to Revalida Stages

Source: AFA
Rules for classification: 1) points; 2) goal difference; 3) Head-to-head points; 4) goals scored; 5) away goals scored; 6) draw of lots.

==== Results ====
Home \ Away	ATR	BAR	BOU	CRU	JUA	SAF	SLB	SAR	SOL
Atlético de Rafaela		0–0	2–0	3–0	1–0	1–1	2–1	2–1	1–0
Bartolomé Mitre (P)	0–1		1–1	0–0	2–0	1–1	0–1	1–0	1–1
Boca Unidos	2–2	1–2		2–2	2–2	0–3	2–1	0–0	2–0
Crucero del Norte	3–2	1–3	1–1		1–0	0–1	0–2	0–1	0–1
Juventud Antoniana	2–0	2–0	2–1	1–0		1–1	1–0	3–0	2–2
San Martín (F)	1–1	1–0	3–0	5–1	0–0		1–0	5–0	4–1
Sarmiento (LB)	1–0	1–0	1–0	4–1	2–1	1–0		0–0	2–1
Sarmiento (R)	0–0	3–3	2–1	0–0	2–1	1–1	1–3		1–0
Sol de América (F)	3–1	0–1	3–1	4–0	1–1	1–1	1–1	2–0	

Legend: Blue = home team win; Yellow = draw; Red = away team win.

== Championship Stages ==
=== Second stage ===
==== Zone A ====
Pos	Team	Pld	W	D	L	GF	GA	GD	Pts	Qualification or Relegation
1	Ciudad de Bolivar	8	5	2	1	11	5	+6	17	Advance to Third stage of Championship Stages and qualification for Copa Argentina
2	Argentino (MM)	8	5	0	3	13	9	+4	15	Advance to Third stage of Championship Stages and qualification for Copa Argentina
3	Olimpo	8	4	3	1	7	4	+3	15	Advance to Third stage of Championship Stages and qualification for Copa Argentina
4	Deportivo Rincón	8	3	2	3	6	7	−1	11	Advance to Third stage of Championship Stages and qualification for Copa Argentina
5	Atenas (RC)	8	1	6	1	3	3	0	9	Advance to Second phase of Revalida Stages and qualification for Copa Argentina
6	Costa Brava	8	2	3	3	8	9	−1	9	Advance to Second phase of Revalida Stages
7	Villa Mitre	8	2	3	3	3	5	−2	9	Advance to Second phase of Revalida Stages
8	Cipolletti	8	1	3	4	4	7	−3	6	Advance to Second phase of Revalida Stages
9	Kimberley	8	1	2	5	5	11	−6	5	Advance to Second phase of Revalida Stages

Source: AFA
Rules for classification: 1) points; 2) goal difference; 3) goals scored; 4) away goals scored; 5) draw of lots.

===== Results =====
Home \ Away	ARG	ATE	CIP	CIU	CBR	DRI	KIM	OLI	VMI
Argentino (MM)		1–0	2–0		3–2	2–0			
Atenas (RC)			0–0	1–1			0–0		1–0
Cipolletti				0–1			3–1	0–1	0–0
Ciudad de Bolivar	3–2				0–0	2–0		2–0	
Costa Brava		1–1	1–1				2–0		1–0
Deportivo Rincón		0–0	1–0		2–1		3–1		
Kimberley	1–2			2–0				0–1	0–0
Olimpo	2–1	0–0			2–0	0–0			
Villa Mitre	1–0			0–2		1–0		1–1	

Legend: Blue = home team win; Yellow = draw; Red = away team win.

==== Zone B ====
Pos	Team	Pld	W	D	L	GF	GA	GD	Pts	Qualification or Relegation
1	Sportivo Belgrano	8	5	1	2	14	10	+4	16	Advance to Third stage of Championship Stages and qualification for Copa Argentina
2	Atlético de Rafaela	8	5	1	2	9	6	+3	16	Advance to Third stage of Championship Stages and qualification for Copa Argentina
3	Gimnasia y Esgrima (Ch)	8	4	2	2	11	6	+5	14	Advance to Third stage of Championship Stages and qualification for Copa Argentina
4	San Martín (F)	8	4	2	2	10	7	+3	14	Advance to Third stage of Championship Stages and qualification for Copa Argentina
5	Sarmiento (LB)	8	4	1	3	7	11	−4	13	Advance to Second phase of Revalida Stages and qualification for Copa Argentina
6	9 de Julio (R)	8	2	4	2	7	7	0	10	Advance to Second phase of Revalida Stages
7	Juventud Antoniana	8	2	3	3	8	8	0	9	Advance to Second phase of Revalida Stages
8	Independiente (Ch)	8	1	3	4	8	11	−3	6	Advance to Second phase of Revalida Stages
9	Douglas Haig	8	0	1	7	3	11	−8	1	Advance to Second phase of Revalida Stages

Source: AFA
Rules for classification: 1) points; 2) goal difference; 3) goals scored; 4) away goals scored; 5) draw of lots.

===== Results =====
Home \ Away	9JU	ATR	DOU	GCH	ICH	JUA	SAF	SLB	SPB
9 de Julio (R)			2–1	1–1		2–0			0–0
Atlético de Rafaela	2–1			2–1	1–0				2–0
Douglas Haig		1–2				0–0	1–2	0–1	
Gimnasia y Esgrima (Ch)			1–0			1–0		3–0	3–0
Independiente (Ch)	1–1		2–0	1–1					2–3
Juventud Antoniana		2–0			0–0		1–1	3–1	
San Martín (F)	2–0	0–0		2–0	3–1				
Sarmiento (LB)	0–0	1–0			2–1		1–0		
Sportivo Belgrano			1–0			3–2	3–0	4–1	

Legend: Blue = home team win; Yellow = draw; Red = away team win.

=== Third to fifth stage ===
Third stage
1A	Ciudad de Bolivar	1	4	5
4B	San Martín (F)	0	1	1
2A	Argentino (MM)	1	3	4
3B	Gimnasia y Esgrima (Ch)	0	1	1
1B	Sportivo Belgrano (bsr)	1	1	2
4A	Deportivo Rincón	2	0	2
2B	Atlético de Rafaela	0	2	2
3A	Olimpo	0	1	1

Fourth stage
1A	Ciudad de Bolivar	0	3	3
2A	Argentino (MM)	1	0	1
1B	Sportivo Belgrano	0	0	0
2B	Atlético de Rafaela	3	0	3

Fifth stage
1A	Ciudad de Bolivar (p)	0 (5)
2B	Atlético de Rafaela	0 (4)

- Note: In the Third and Fourth stage, the team in the first line plays at home the second leg. The fifth stage is played on neutral ground.

=== Fifth stage ===
October 19, 2025	Ciudad de Bolivar	0–0 (5–4 p)	Atlético de Rafaela	San Nicolás, Pcia. de Buenos Aires
16:00 UTC−3				Stadium: Estadio Único de San Nicolás; Referee: Juan Ignacio Nebbietti

Ciudad de Bolivar is promoted to Primera Nacional.

== Revalida Stages ==
=== First phase ===
==== Zone A ====
Pos	Team	Pld	W	D	L	GF	GA	GD	Pts	Qualification or Relegation
1	Guillermo Brown	9	6	2	1	15	6	+9	20	Advance to Second phase of Revalida Stages
2	Germinal	9	5	1	3	9	7	+2	16	Advance to Second phase of Revalida Stages
3	San Martín (M)	9	4	3	2	10	6	+4	15	Advance to Second phase of Revalida Stages
4	Sol de Mayo	9	5	0	4	12	15	−3	15	Advance to Second phase of Revalida Stages
5	Juventud Unida Universitario	9	3	5	1	8	4	+4	14	Advance to Second phase of Revalida Stages
6	Círculo Deportivo	9	3	4	2	7	4	+3	13	
7	Huracán Las Heras	9	3	2	4	10	11	−1	11	
8	Santamarina	9	3	2	4	9	11	−2	11	
9	Estudiantes (SL)	9	2	3	4	7	8	−1	9	
10	Gutiérrez	9	0	0	9	3	18	−15	0	

Source: AFA
Rules for classification: 1) points; 2) goal difference; 3) goals scored; 4) away goals scored; 5) draw of lots.

===== Results =====
Home \ Away	CIR	ESL	GER	GBR	GUT	HLH	JUU	RSA	SMA	SDM
Círculo Deportivo		0–0		0–0			0–0	1–0		4–0
Estudiantes (SL)			2–0		4–1	0–1			1–2	
Germinal	2–0			1–0			0–0			1–0
Guillermo Brown		1–0					2–0	4–1	1–1	2–0
Gutiérrez	1–2		0–1	0–1			0–2			
Huracán Las Heras	1–0		1–2	3–4	1–0			1–2		
Juventud Unida Universitario		0–0				1–1			2–1	3–0
Santamarina		1–1	0–2		2–0		0–0			2–0
San Martín (M)	0–0		2–0		2–0	0–0		2–1		
Sol de Mayo		2–1			5–1	2–1			1–0	

Legend: Blue = home team win; Yellow = draw; Red = away team win.

==== Zone B ====
Pos	Team	Pld	W	D	L	GF	GA	GD	Pts	Qualification or Relegation
1	Boca Unidos	9	6	0	3	15	6	+9	18	Advance to Second phase of Revalida Stages
2	Bartolomé Mitre (P)	9	5	1	3	11	7	+4	16	Advance to Second phase of Revalida Stages
3	Sarmiento (R)	9	5	1	3	13	12	+1	16	Advance to Second phase of Revalida Stages
4	Sportivo Las Parejas	9	5	1	3	11	10	+1	16	Advance to Second phase of Revalida Stages
5	El Linqueño	9	4	2	3	11	6	+5	14	Advance to Second phase of Revalida Stages
6	Sol de América (F)	9	4	1	4	11	8	+3	13	
7	Defensores de Belgrano (VR)	9	3	3	3	13	13	0	12	
8	Gimnasia y Esgrima (CdU)	9	3	2	4	9	12	−3	11	
9	Ben Hur	9	3	1	5	10	16	−6	10	
10	Crucero del Norte	9	0	2	7	8	22	−14	2	

Source: AFA
Rules for classification: 1) points; 2) goal difference; 3) goals scored; 4) away goals scored; 5) draw of lots.

===== Results =====
Home \ Away	BAR	BEN	BOU	CRU	DEF	ELI	GYE	SAR	SOL	SLP
Bartolomé Mitre (P)		4–1		0–0	2–1	2–1				0–1
Ben Hur				3–1		1–0	2–0		0–2	
Boca Unidos	2–0	3–0						1–0		0–1
Crucero del Norte			1–4				1–1	2–3	2–3	
Defensores de Belgrano (VR)		1–1	0–2	3–1		1–1		2–2		
El Linqueño			1–0	3–0			0–0		2–0	
Gimnasia y Esgrima (CdU)	1–0		0–3		2–1			1–2		3–0
Sarmiento (R)	0–2	2–1				2–1				1–2
Sol de América (F)	0–1		3–0		0–1		3–1	0–1		
Sportivo Las Parejas		3–1		2–0	2–3	0–2			0–0	

Legend: Blue = home team win; Yellow = draw; Red = away team win.

=== Bracket ===
Second phase 03-12 October
10	Villa Mitre	0	2	2
15	Guillermo Brown	3	1	4
1	Olimpo	0	2	2
24	Juventud Unida Universitario	0	0	0
12	Cipolletti	0	0	0
13	Kimberley	1	0	1
11	Independiente (Ch)	2	1	3
14	Douglas Haig	4	0	4
2	Gimnasia y Esgrima (Ch)	1	2	3
23	El Linqueño	1	1	2
9	Juventud Antoniana	0	3	3
16	Boca Unidos	2	0	2
4	Deportivo Rincón	0	5	5
21	Sportivo Las Parejas	2	0	2
7	9 de Julio (R)	1	4	5
18	Germinal	1	0	1
3	San Martín (F) (bsr)	1	1	2
22	Sol de Mayo	2	0	2
8	Costa Brava (bsr)	1	0	1
17	Bartolomé Mitre (P)	1	0	0
5	Sarmiento (LB) (bsr)	0	1	1
20	San Martín (M)	0	1	1
12	Atenas (RC)	1	4	5
13	Sarmiento (R)	0	0	0

Third phase 19 October - 02 November
1	Sportivo Belgrano (SF1)	0	1	1
14	Guillermo Brown	2	0	2
3	Olimpo	1	3	4
12	Kimberley	1	1	2
2	Argentino (MM) (SF2)	0	1	1
13	Douglas Haig	2	1	3
4	Gimnasia y Esgrima (Ch)	0	2	2
11	Juventud Antoniana	0	1	1
6	Deportivo Rincón	1	0	1
9	9 de Julio (R)	2	0	2
5	San Martín (F)	1	2	3
10	Costa Brava	1	1	2
7	Sarmiento (LB)	0	0	0
8	Atenas (RC)	1	1	2

Fourth phase 09-16 November
1	Atlético de Rafaela (F1)	2	1	3
8	Guillermo Brown	1	0	0
2	Olimpo	0	0	0
7	Douglas Haig	5	1	6
3	Gimnasia y Esgrima (Ch)	0	1	1
6	9 de Julio (R)	1	2	3
4	San Martín (F)	1	3	4
5	Atenas (RC)	0	1	1

Fifth phase 23-30 November
1	Atlético de Rafaela (F1)	2	2	4
4	Douglas Haig	1	1	1
2	San Martín (F)	1	4	5
3	9 de Julio (R)	2	1	3

Sixth phase
1	Atlético de Rafaela (F1)	1	1	2
2	San Martín (F)	0	0	0

=== Second phase ===
Pos	Grp	Team	Pld	W	D	L	GF	GA	GD	Pts	Qualification
1	3º A	Olimpo	8	4	3	1	7	4	+3	15	Qualified from Third stage of Championship Stages
2	3º B	Gimnasia y Esgrima (Ch)	8	4	2	2	11	6	+5	14	Qualified from Third stage of Championship Stages
3	4º B	San Martín (F)	8	4	2	2	10	7	+3	14	Qualified from Third stage of Championship Stages
4	4º A	Deportivo Rincón	8	3	2	3	6	7	−1	11	Qualified from Third stage of Championship Stages
5	5º B	Sarmiento (LB)	8	4	1	3	7	11	−4	13	Qualified from Second stage of Championship Stages
6	5º A	Atenas (RC)	8	1	6	1	3	3	0	9	Qualified from Second stage of Championship Stages
7	6º B	9 de Julio (R)	8	2	4	2	7	7	0	10	Qualified from Second stage of Championship Stages
8	6º A	Costa Brava	8	2	3	3	8	9	−1	9	Qualified from Second stage of Championship Stages
9	7º B	Juventud Antoniana	8	2	3	3	8	8	0	9	Qualified from Second stage of Championship Stages
10	7º A	Villa Mitre	8	2	3	3	3	5	−2	9	Qualified from Second stage of Championship Stages
11	8º B	Independiente (Ch)	8	1	3	4	8	11	−3	6	Qualified from Second stage of Championship Stages
12	8º A	Cipolletti	8	1	3	4	4	7	−3	6	Qualified from Second stage of Championship Stages
13	9º A	Kimberley	8	1	2	5	5	11	−6	5	Qualified from Second stage of Championship Stages
14	9º B	Douglas Haig	8	0	1	7	3	11	−8	1	Qualified from Second stage of Championship Stages
15	1º A	Guillermo Brown	9	6	2	1	15	6	+9	20	Qualified from First phase of Revalida Stages
16	1º B	Boca Unidos	9	6	0	3	15	6	+9	18	Qualified from First phase of Revalida Stages
17	2º B	Bartolomé Mitre (P)	9	5	1	3	11	7	+4	16	Qualified from First phase of Revalida Stages
18	2º A	Germinal	9	5	1	3	9	7	+2	16	Qualified from First phase of Revalida Stages
19	3º B	Sarmiento (R)	9	5	1	3	13	12	+1	16	Qualified from First phase of Revalida Stages
20	3º A	San Martín (M)	9	4	3	2	10	6	+4	15	Qualified from First phase of Revalida Stages
21	4º B	Sportivo Las Parejas	9	5	1	3	11	10	+1	16	Qualified from First phase of Revalida Stages
22	4º A	Sol de Mayo	9	5	0	4	12	15	−3	15	Qualified from First phase of Revalida Stages
23	5º B	El Linqueño	9	4	2	3	11	6	+5	14	Qualified from First phase of Revalida Stages
24	5º A	Juventud Unida Universitario	9	3	5	1	8	4	+4	14	Qualified from First phase of Revalida Stages

Source: AFA
Rules for classification: 1) Points per game; 2) Performance in previous stage; 3) Goal difference; 4) goals scored; 5) Drawing of lots.

Team 1	Agg.	Team 2	1st leg	2nd leg
Olimpo	2–0	Juventud Unida Universitario	0–0	2–0
Gimnasia y Esgrima (Ch)	3–2	El Linqueño	1–1	2–1
San Martín (F) (bsr)	2–2	Sol de Mayo	1–2	1–0
Deportivo Rincón	5–2	Sportivo Las Parejas	0–2	5–0
Sarmiento (LB) (bsr)	1–1	San Martín (M)	0–0	1–1
Atenas (RC)	5–0	Sarmiento (R)	1–0	4–0
9 de Julio (R)	6–1	Germinal	1–1	5–0
Costa Brava (bsr)	1–1	Bartolomé Mitre (P)	1–1	0–0
Juventud Antoniana	3–2	Boca Unidos	0–2	3–0
Villa Mitre	2–4	Guillermo Brown	0–3	2–1
Independiente (Ch)	3–4	Douglas Haig	2–4	1–0
Cipolletti	0–1	Kimberley	0–1	0–0

=== Third phase ===
Pos	Grp	Team	Pld	W	D	L	GF	GA	GD	Pts	Qualification
1	SF	Sportivo Belgrano	8	5	1	2	14	10	+4	16	Losing semifinalists from Third stage of Championship Stages
2	SF	Argentino (MM)	8	5	0	3	13	9	+4	15	Losing semifinalists from Third stage of Championship Stages
3	3º A	Olimpo	8	4	3	1	7	4	+3	15	Qualified from Second stage of Championship Stages
4	3º B	Gimnasia y Esgrima (Ch)	8	4	2	2	11	6	+5	14	Qualified from Second stage of Championship Stages
5	4º B	San Martín (F)	8	4	2	2	10	7	+3	14	Qualified from Second stage of Championship Stages
6	4º A	Deportivo Rincón	8	3	2	3	6	7	−1	11	Qualified from Second stage of Championship Stages
7	5º B	Sarmiento (LB)	8	4	1	3	7	11	−4	13	Qualified from Second stage of Championship Stages
8	5º A	Atenas (RC)	8	1	6	1	3	3	0	9	Qualified from Second stage of Championship Stages
9	6º B	9 de Julio (R)	8	2	4	2	7	7	0	10	Qualified from Second stage of Championship Stages
10	6º A	Costa Brava	8	2	3	3	8	9	−1	9	Qualified from Second stage of Championship Stages
11	7º B	Juventud Antoniana	8	2	3	3	8	8	0	9	Qualified from Second stage of Championship Stages
12	9º A	Kimberley	8	1	2	5	5	11	−6	5	Qualified from Second stage of Championship Stages
13	9º B	Douglas Haig	8	0	1	7	3	11	−8	1	Qualified from Second stage of Championship Stages
14	1º A	Guillermo Brown	9	6	2	1	15	6	+9	20	Qualified from First phase of Revalida Stages

Source: AFA
Rules for classification: 1) Points per game; 2) Performance in previous stage; 3) Goal difference; 4) goals scored; 5) Drawing of lots.

Team 1	Agg.	Team 2	1st leg	2nd leg
Sportivo Belgrano	1–2	Guillermo Brown	0–2	1–0
Argentino (MM)	1–3	Douglas Haig	0–2	1–1
Olimpo	4–2	Kimberley	1–1	3–1
Gimnasia y Esgrima (Ch)	2–1	Juventud Antoniana	0–0	2–1
San Martín (F)	3–2	Costa Brava	1–1	2–1
Deportivo Rincón	1–2	9 de Julio (R)	1–2	0–0
Sarmiento (LB)	0–2	Atenas (RC)	0–1	0–1

=== Fourth phase ===
Pos	Grp	Team	Pld	W	D	L	GF	GA	GD	Pts	Qualification
1	F	Atlético de Rafaela	8	5	1	2	9	6	+3	16	Losing finalist from Fourth stage of Championship Stages
2	3º A	Olimpo	8	4	3	1	7	4	+3	15	Qualified from Second stage of Championship Stages
3	3º B	Gimnasia y Esgrima (Ch)	8	4	2	2	11	6	+5	14	Qualified from Second stage of Championship Stages
4	4º B	San Martín (F)	8	4	2	2	10	7	+3	14	Qualified from Second stage of Championship Stages
5	5º A	Atenas (RC)	8	1	6	1	3	3	0	9	Qualified from Second stage of Championship Stages
6	6º B	9 de Julio (R)	8	2	4	2	7	7	0	10	Qualified from Second stage of Championship Stages
7	9º B	Douglas Haig	8	0	1	7	3	11	−8	1	Qualified from Second stage of Championship Stages
8	1º A	Guillermo Brown	9	6	2	1	15	6	+9	20	Qualified from First phase of Revalida Stages

Source: AFA
Rules for classification: 1) Points per game; 2) Performance in previous stage; 3) Goal difference; 4) goals scored; 5) Drawing of lots.

Team 1	Agg.	Team 2	1st leg	2nd leg
Atlético de Rafaela	3–1	Guillermo Brown	2–1	1–0
Olimpo	0–6	Douglas Haig	0–5	0–1
Gimnasia y Esgrima (Ch)	1–3	9 de Julio (R)	0–1	1–2
San Martín (F)	4–1	Atenas (RC)	1–0	3–1

=== Fifth phase ===
Pos	Grp	Team	Pld	W	D	L	GF	GA	GD	Pts	Qualification
1	F	Atlético de Rafaela	8	5	1	2	9	6	+3	16	Losing finalist from Fourth stage of Championship Stages
2	4º B	San Martín (F)	8	4	2	2	10	7	+3	14	Qualified from Second stage of Championship Stages
3	6º B	9 de Julio (R)	8	2	4	2	7	7	0	10	Qualified from Second stage of Championship Stages
4	9º B	Douglas Haig	8	0	1	7	3	11	−8	1	Qualified from Second stage of Championship Stages

Source: AFA
Rules for classification: 1) Points per game; 2) Performance in previous stage; 3) Goal difference; 4) goals scored; 5) Drawing of lots.

Team 1	Agg.	Team 2	1st leg	2nd leg
Atlético de Rafaela	4–2	Douglas Haig	2–1	2–1
San Martín (F)	5–3	9 de Julio (R)	1–2	4–1

=== Sixth phase ===
Pos	Grp	Team	Pld	W	D	L	GF	GA	GD	Pts	Qualification
1	F	Atlético de Rafaela	8	5	1	2	9	6	+3	16	Losing finalist from Fourth stage of Championship Stages
2	4º B	San Martín (F)	8	4	2	2	10	7	+3	14	Qualified from Second stage of Championship Stages

Source: AFA
Rules for classification: 1) Points per game; 2) Performance in previous stage; 3) Goal difference; 4) goals scored; 5) Drawing of lots.

Team 1	Agg.	Team 2	1st leg	2nd leg
Atlético de Rafaela	2–0	San Martín (F)	1–0	1–0

Atlético de Rafaela is promoted to Primera Nacional.

== Relegation ==
=== Zone A ===
Pos	Team	First Stage Pts	Reválida Stage Pts	Total Pts	Total Pld	Avg	Relegation
1	Guillermo Brown	21	20	41	27	1.519	
2	San Martín (M)	21	15	36	25	1.44	
3	Juventud Unida Universitario	20	14	34	25	1.36	
4	Círculo Deportivo	23	13	36	27	1.333	
5	Huracán Las Heras	21	11	32	25	1.28	
6	Germinal	16	16	32	27	1.185	
7	Sol de Mayo	17	15	32	27	1.185	
8	Santamarina	20	11	31	27	1.148	
9	Estudiantes (SL)	18	9	27	25	1.08	Torneo Regional Federal Amateur
10	Gutiérrez	8	0	8	25	0.32	Torneo Regional Federal Amateur

=== Zone B ===
Pos	Team	First Stage Pts	Reválida Stage Pts	Total Pts	Total Pld	Avg	Relegation
1	Bartolomé Mitre (P)	21	16	37	25	1.48	
2	Sportivo Las Parejas	22	16	38	27	1.407	
3	Sarmiento (R)	18	16	34	25	1.36	
4	Sol de América (F)	20	13	33	25	1.32	
5	El Linqueño	19	14	33	27	1.222	
6	Boca Unidos	12	18	30	25	1.2	
7	Defensores de Belgrano (VR)	20	12	32	27	1.185	
8	Gimnasia y Esgrima (CdU)	20	11	31	27	1.148	
9	Ben Hur	18	10	28	27	1.037	Torneo Regional Federal Amateur
10	Crucero del Norte	10	2	12	25	0.48	Torneo Regional Federal Amateur

== See also ==
- 2025 Argentine Primera División
- 2025 Primera Nacional
- 2025 Primera B Metropolitana
- 2025 Copa Argentina
