= 2023 Torneo Federal A =

XI Torneo Federal A
- Season: 2023
- Champions: Gimnasia y Tiro (1st divisional title)
- Relegated: Liniers (BB); Sportivo Peñarol
- Matches played: 604
- Goals scored: 1,259 (2.08 per match)
- Biggest home win: Atenas (RC) 8-2 Sportivo Peñarol (October 29)
- Biggest away win: Sol de Mayo 0-4 Villa Mitre (September 30)
- Highest scoring: Atenas (RC) 8-2 Sportivo Peñarol (October 29)
- All statistics correct as of December 4, 2023.

The 2023 Argentine Torneo Federal A was the eleventh season of the Torneo Federal A, the regionalised third tier of the Argentine football league system. The tournament is reserved for teams indirectly affiliated to the Asociación del Fútbol Argentino (AFA), while teams affiliated to AFA have to play the Primera B Metropolitana, which is the other third tier competition. The competition was contested by 29 of the 34 teams that took part in the 2022 season, with one team relegated from Primera Nacional and six teams promoted from Torneo Regional Federal Amateur. One team was promoted to Primera Nacional, other team qualified for a promotion playoff against a team from Primera B Metropolitana and two teams were relegated to Torneo Regional Federal Amateur. The season began on 12 march and ended on 3 December 2023.

== Format ==
=== First stage ===
The 36 teams were split into four zones of nine teams, where they will play against the other teams in their group four: twice at home and twice away. The top four teams from each zone qualified for the final stages.

=== Final Stages ===
The final stages was played between the 16 teams that qualified from the first stage. They were seeded in the final stages according to their results in the first stage, with the best eight seeded 1–8, and the worst eight teams seeded 9–16. The teams played four rounds and the winner was declared champion and automatically promoted to the Primera Nacional, the losing team in the final qualified for a promotion playoff against a team from Primera B Metropolitana.

=== Relegation ===
After the first stage, the bottom team of each zone qualified for a Relegation play-off, facing the teams in neutral venue. The losing teams were relegated to the Torneo Regional Federal Amateur, giving a total of two teams relegated.

== Club information ==
Locations of the 2023 season teams.
Yellow: Zone A; Blue: Zone B;
Green: Zone C; Red: Zone D.

=== Zone A ===
Team	City	Stadium
Cipolletti	Cipolletti	La Visera de Cemento
Círculo Deportivo	Cdte. Nicanor Otamendi	Guillermo Trama
Germinal	Rawson	El Fortín
Liniers	Bahía Blanca	Alejandro Pérez
Olimpo	Bahía Blanca	Roberto Natalio Carminatti
Sansinena	General Cerri	Luis Molina
Santamarina	Tandil	Municipal General San Martín
Sol de Mayo	Viedma	Sol de Mayo
Villa Mitre	Bahía Blanca	El Fortín

=== Zone B ===
Team	City	Stadium
Argentino	Monte Maíz	Modesto Marrone
Atenas	Río Cuarto	9 de Julio
Ciudad de Bolivar	San Carlos de Bolívar	Municipal Eva Perón
Estudiantes	San Luis	Héctor Odicino – Pedro Benoza
Ferro Carril Oeste	General Pico	El Coloso del Barrio Talleres
Huracán Las Heras	Las Heras	General San Martín
Juventud Unida Universitario	San Luis	Mario Diez
San Martín	San Martín	Libertador General San Martín
Sportivo Peñarol	Chimbas	Ramón Pablo Rojas

=== Zone C ===
Team	City	Stadium
Defensores	Pronunciamiento	Delio Cardozo
Defensores de Belgrano	Villa Ramallo	Salomón Boeseldín
Douglas Haig	Pergamino	Miguel Morales
El Linqueño	Lincoln	Leonardo Costa
Gimnasia y Esgrima	Concepción del Uruguay	Manuel y Ramón Núñez
Independiente	Chivilcoy	Raúl Orlando Lungarzo
Sportivo Belgrano	San Francisco	Oscar Boero
Sportivo Las Parejas	Las Parejas	Fortaleza del Lobo
Unión	Sunchales	La Fortaleza

=== Zone D ===
Team	City	Stadium
9 de Julio	Rafaela	Germán Solterman
Boca Unidos	Corrientes	José Antonio Romero Feris
Central Norte	Salta	Doctor Luis Güemes
Crucero del Norte	Garupá	Andrés Guacurarí
Gimnasia y Tiro	Salta	Gigante del Norte
Juventud Antoniana	Salta	Fray Honorato Pistoia
San Martín	Formosa	17 De Octubre
Sarmiento	Resistencia	Centenario
Sol de América	Formosa	Sol de América

== First stage ==
=== Zone A ===
Pos	Team	Pld	W	D	L	GF	GA	GD	Pts	Qualification or Relegation
1	Olimpo	32	20	10	2	58	20	+38	70	Advance to Final Stages and qualification for Copa Argentina
2	Villa Mitre	32	19	10	3	55	15	+40	67	Advance to Final Stages and qualification for Copa Argentina
3	Cipolletti	32	13	8	11	35	34	+1	47	Advance to Final Stages
4	Santamarina	32	11	11	10	33	31	+2	44	Advance to Final Stages
5	Sansinena	32	12	7	13	33	37	−4	43	
6	Sol de Mayo	32	11	5	16	35	52	−17	38	
7	Germinal	32	9	7	16	30	45	−15	34	
8	Círculo Deportivo	32	7	8	17	25	46	−21	29	
9	Liniers (BB)	32	6	6	20	18	42	−24	24	Qualified to Relegation play-off

Source: AFA
Rules for classification: 1) points; 2) goal difference; 3) Head-to-head points; 4) goals scored; 5) away goals scored; 6) draw of lots.

==== Results ====
===== Matches 1–18 =====
Home \ Away	CIP	CIR	GER	LIN	OLI	SAN	RSA	SOL	VMI
Cipolletti		1–0	1–0	1–0	1–0	3–0	1–3	0–1	1–2
Círculo Deportivo	2–1		0–1	3–0	0–2	0–3	0–1	1–0	0–0
Germinal	1–1	0–1		1–0	1–1	1–1	0–2	0–1	1–0
Liniers (BB)	1–2	2–0	2–1		2–2	2–0	2–1	0–1	0–0
Olimpo	1–1	2–0	3–1	1–0		1–0	2–2	5–0	1–0
Sansinena	2–1	2–0	3–0	2–0	0–2		2–0	2–1	0–2
Santamarina	1–0	2–1	1–1	1–0	0–0	1–1		0–0	0–0
Sol de Mayo	4–2	1–1	1–4	0–1	2–3	1–0	3–0		1–1
Villa Mitre	2–0	3–1	3–0	0–0	1–0	0–0	2–0	1–0	

Source: AFA
Legend: Blue = home team win; Yellow = draw; Red = away team win.

===== Matches 19–36 =====
Home \ Away	CIP	CIR	GER	LIN	OLI	SAN	RSA	SOL	VMI
Cipolletti		2–0	2–2	1–0	0–0	2–1	2–1	0–0	0–0
Círculo Deportivo	1–2		3–3	0–0	2–2	0–0	1–0	3–2	1–4
Germinal	0–0	2–0		1–0	0–2	2–0	2–1	1–2	0–1
Liniers (BB)	0–1	0–0	1–3		1–3	0–1	0–1	2–0	0–2
Olimpo	3–2	1–0	3–0	4–0		2–0	3–0	2–0	3–2
Sansinena	1–1	1–2	1–0	1–0	1–1		1–0	3–0	2–4
Santamarina	2–1	3–0	3–0	1–1	1–1	0–0		3–0	1–1
Sol de Mayo	1–2	2–1	2–1	3–0	0–2	4–2	1–1		0–4
Villa Mitre	2–0	1–1	3–0	4–1	0–0	4–0	2–0	4–1	

Updated to match(es) played on unknown. Source: AFA
Legend: Blue = home team win; Yellow = draw; Red = away team win.

=== Zone B ===
Pos	Team	Pld	W	D	L	GF	GA	GD	Pts	Qualification or Relegation
1	Ciudad de Bolivar	32	17	8	7	45	25	+20	59	Advance to Final Stages and qualification for Copa Argentina
2	Argentino (MM)	32	15	13	4	53	27	+26	58	Advance to Final Stages and qualification for Copa Argentina
3	Juventud Unida Universitario	32	13	12	7	33	23	+10	51	Advance to Final Stages
4	Atenas (RC)	32	12	8	12	43	42	+1	44	Advance to Final Stages
5	Huracán Las Heras	32	12	7	13	29	39	−10	43	
6	San Martín (M)	32	10	9	13	29	34	−5	39	
7	Ferro Carril Oeste (GP)	32	10	7	15	31	38	−7	37	
8	Estudiantes (SL)	32	8	11	13	33	41	−8	35	
9	Sportivo Peñarol	32	6	7	19	30	57	−27	25	Qualified to Relegation play-off

Source: AFA
Rules for classification: 1) points; 2) goal difference; 3) Head-to-head points; 4) goals scored; 5) away goals scored; 6) draw of lots.

==== Results ====
===== Matches 1–18 =====
Home \ Away	ARG	ATE	CIU	ESL	FCO	HLH	JUU	SMA	SPP
Argentino (MM)		0–2	5–3	3–0	3–1	4–0	2–2	2–0	2–1
Atenas (RC)	0–0		0–1	3–3	3–1	1–1	1–0	1–0	1–2
Ciudad de Bolivar	1–1	3–1		2–1	1–0	3–1	2–0	3–0	1–0
Estudiantes (SL)	1–4	3–0	1–3		0–0	0–0	0–0	1–1	3–0
Ferro Carril Oeste (GP)	1–3	3–0	1–0	1–0		2–3	0–2	1–0	2–0
Huracán Las Heras	0–1	3–2	0–2	2–1	2–1		0–0	1–0	2–1
Juventud Unida Universitario	0–2	3–1	0–0	0–0	1–0	1–0		1–1	1–0
San Martín (M)	0–0	1–0	1–1	1–0	0–0	1–0	0–0		1–0
Sportivo Peñarol	1–3	0–1	0–0	1–1	1–1	2–0	2–0	4–2	

Source: AFA
Legend: Blue = home team win; Yellow = draw; Red = away team win.

===== Matches 19–36 =====
Home \ Away	ARG	ATE	CIU	ESL	FCO	HLH	JUU	SMA	SPP
Argentino (MM)		0–0	2–2	0–1	3–0	2–0	1–1	1–3	1–1
Atenas (RC)	2–2		1–0	2–2	3–1	2–1	0–0	1–0	8–2
Ciudad de Bolivar	0–0	0–2		2–0	2–0	1–0	2–1	0–3	3–0
Estudiantes (SL)	0–2	2–1	1–0		2–2	2–1	0–0	2–0	4–1
Ferro Carril Oeste (GP)	1–2	2–1	0–0	2–0		2–0	1–2	1–0	2–0
Huracán Las Heras	1–1	1–0	0–3	1–0	2–1		1–1	1–0	1–0
Juventud Unida Universitario	1–1	4–0	1–0	2–0	2–1	1–0		2–0	2–1
San Martín (M)	1–0	0–2	1–1	3–1	0–0	2–2	2–1		4–1
Sportivo Peñarol	0–0	1–1	1–3	1–1	0–2	1–2	2–1	3–1	

Updated to match(es) played on unknown. Source: AFA
Legend: Blue = home team win; Yellow = draw; Red = away team win.

=== Zone C ===
Pos	Team	Pld	W	D	L	GF	GA	GD	Pts	Qualification or Relegation
1	Douglas Haig	32	20	7	5	43	22	+21	67	Advance to Final Stages and qualification for Copa Argentina
2	Independiente (Ch)	32	14	7	11	31	25	+6	49	Advance to Final Stages and qualification for Copa Argentina
3	Sportivo Las Parejas	32	14	5	13	37	33	+4	47 (Note: Sportivo Las Parejas ahead of Sportivo Las Parejas on head-to-head goal difference.)	Advance to Final Stages
4	Sportivo Belgrano	32	14	5	13	42	34	+8	47	Advance to Final Stages
5	El Linqueño	32	12	8	12	41	37	+4	44	
6	Defensores (P)	32	11	7	14	32	39	−7	40	
7	Defensores de Belgrano (VR)	32	10	8	14	29	39	−10	38	
8	Unión (S)	32	11	4	17	25	38	−13	37	
9	Gimnasia y Esgrima (CdU)	32	8	9	15	24	37	−13	33	Qualified to Relegation play-off

Source: AFA
Rules for classification: 1) points; 2) goal difference; 3) Head-to-head points; 4) goals scored; 5) away goals scored; 6) draw of lots.

==== Results ====
===== Matches 1–18 =====
Home \ Away	DPR	DEF	DOU	ELI	GYE	ICH	SPB	SLP	UNS
Defensores (P)		3–3	0–1	1–1	2–2	2–1	1–0	0–3	1–0
Defensores de Belgrano (VR)	1–0		1–2	0–0	1–0	0–1	0–2	0–0	0–2
Douglas Haig	3–0	2–1		3–1	1–0	0–1	2–1	1–0	2–1
El Linqueño	2–1	0–1	0–2		3–1	3–0	2–2	1–2	0–1
Gimnasia y Esgrima (CdU)	0–0	3–1	0–0	2–5		0–0	1–2	0–2	2–0
Independiente (Ch)	4–0	0–0	0–0	2–0	3–1		4–1	0–1	2–0
Sportivo Belgrano	3–0	1–1	0–2	1–0	2–0	2–0		1–2	2–0
Sportivo Las Parejas	0–1	2–0	0–1	0–1	3–0	0–1	0–2		1–0
Unión (S)	1–0	1–1	2–1	1–1	1–0	1–0	1–1	1–0	

Source: AFA
Legend: Blue = home team win; Yellow = draw; Red = away team win.

===== Matches 19–36 =====
Home \ Away	DPR	DEF	DOU	ELI	GYE	ICH	SPB	SLP	UNS
Defensores (P)		2–1	4–0	2–2	1–2	1–0	2–0	3–1	3–0
Defensores de Belgrano (VR)	1–0		1–3	3–1	0–1	2–0	3–2	1–0	2–0
Douglas Haig	0–0	3–0		0–0	1–0	1–1	1–0	3–0	4–2
El Linqueño	2–0	3–0	0–1		1–0	2–0	1–1	3–0	2–0
Gimnasia y Esgrima (CdU)	1–1	2–0	1–1	0–0		1–0	1–2	2–1	0–1
Independiente (Ch)	1–0	0–0	1–0	3–2	0–0		1–0	0–0	2–0
Sportivo Belgrano	0–1	0–3	3–0	4–0	2–0	1–0		1–2	1–0
Sportivo Las Parejas	2–0	1–1	1–2	3–1	0–1	4–1	1–1		3–0
Unión (S)	1–0	2–0	0–1	0–1	0–0	0–2	1–2	5–1	

Updated to match(es) played on unknown. Source: AFA
Legend: Blue = home team win; Yellow = draw; Red = away team win.

=== Zone D ===
Pos	Team	Pld	W	D	L	GF	GA	GD	Pts	Qualification or Relegation
1	Gimnasia y Tiro	32	16	11	5	32	17	+15	59	Advance to Final Stages and qualification for Copa Argentina
2	Central Norte	32	13	10	9	38	30	+8	49	Advance to Final Stages and qualification for Copa Argentina
3	Boca Unidos	32	12	10	10	31	36	−5	46	Advance to Final Stages
4	Sol de América (F)	32	12	9	11	33	29	+4	45	Advance to Final Stages
5	San Martín (F)	32	13	4	15	31	26	+5	43	
6	9 de Julio (R)	32	11	8	13	34	34	0	41	
7	Sarmiento (R)	32	10	9	13	27	31	−4	39	
8	Crucero del Norte	32	8	12	12	28	35	−7	36	
9	Juventud Antoniana	32	7	11	14	20	36	−16	32	Qualified to Relegation play-off

Source: AFA
Rules for classification: 1) points; 2) goal difference; 3) Head-to-head points; 4) goals scored; 5) away goals scored; 6) draw of lots.

==== Results ====
===== Matches 1–18 =====
Home \ Away	9JU	BOU	CNO	CRU	GYT	JUA	SAF	SAR	SOL
9 de Julio (R)		2–0	3–1	2–1	2–1	0–1	1–0	0–1	1–1
Boca Unidos	2–0		0–0	1–0	2–1	2–0	1–0	0–2	2–2
Central Norte	2–0	3–0		0–1	0–0	2–1	2–0	2–3	0–0
Crucero del Norte	2–1	1–1	1–2		0–0	2–0	1–0	1–2	2–1
Gimnasia y Tiro	2–0	1–0	1–1	3–1		1–0	2–1	0–0	2–1
Juventud Antoniana	1–1	2–1	2–1	1–1	0–0		1–0	0–0	0–0
San Martín (F)	2–0	0–0	2–0	2–0	0–1	1–0		1–0	2–0
Sarmiento (R)	1–1	0–0	1–0	3–1	0–1	0–1	1–0		1–0
Sol de América (F)	1–0	6–1	1–0	2–0	0–0	1–0	2–0	1–0	

Source: AFA
Legend: Blue = home team win; Yellow = draw; Red = away team win.

===== Matches 19–36 =====
Home \ Away	9JU	BOU	CNO	CRU	GYT	JUA	SAF	SAR	SOL
9 de Julio (R)		2–0	1–1	0–1	0–0	2–0	2–1	2–1	2–0
Boca Unidos	1–1		1–0	2–1	0–0	1–0	2–0	1–0	1–1
Central Norte	3–2	3–0		1–1	2–0	1–3	0–0	1–0	2–1
Crucero del Norte	2–2	1–3	1–1		0–0	2–0	1–0	0–0	0–0
Gimnasia y Tiro	1–0	1–0	1–1	1–0		4–1	3–0	1–0	1–0
Juventud Antoniana	0–3	2–2	0–1	0–0	0–0		1–0	0–0	1–1
San Martín (F)	2–1	1–1	1–1	1–0	3–0	3–0		5–0	1–0
Sarmiento (R)	0–0	1–2	1–2	2–2	2–1	1–1	1–2		3–0
Sol de América (F)	2–0	2–1	1–2	1–1	0–2	2–1	1–0	2–0	

Updated to match(es) played on unknown. Source: AFA
Legend: Blue = home team win; Yellow = draw; Red = away team win.

=== Copa Argentina qualification ===
Ten Torneo Federal A teams qualified for the round of 32 of the 2024 Copa Argentina, which were the top two teams plus the two best third-placed teams of each zone.

==== Ranking of third-placed teams ====
Pos	Grp	Team	Pld	W	D	L	GF	GA	GD	Pts	Qualification
1	B	Juventud Unida Universitario	32	13	12	7	33	23	+10	51	Qualification for Copa Argentina
2	C	Sportivo Las Parejas	32	14	5	13	37	33	+4	47	Qualification for Copa Argentina
3	A	Cipolletti	32	13	8	11	35	34	+1	47	
4	D	Boca Unidos	32	12	10	10	31	36	−5	46	

Rules for classification: 1) points; 2) goal difference; 3) goal scored; 4) away goals scored; 5) draw of lots.

== Relegation play-off ==
The bottom team of each zone qualified for a Relegation play-off, facing the teams in neutral venue. The losing teams were relegated to the Torneo Regional Federal Amateur.

November 5, 2023	Gimnasia y Esgrima (CdU)	2–0	Liniers (BB)	Las Parejas, Pcia. de Santa Fe
17:00 UTC−3				Stadium: 4 de Septiembre; Referee: Fernando Rekers

November 5, 2023	Juventud Antoniana	3–1	Sportivo Peñarol	Santiago del Estero, Pcia. de Santiago del Estero
17:00 UTC−3				Stadium: Arturo Miranda; Referee: Bruno Amiconi

== Final Stages ==
The teams placing first to fourth place in each zone play the Torneo Reducido or Final Stages to decide the champion and the first team promoted to Primera Nacional, and the team that will play a playoff against the winner of 2023 Primera B Metropolitana Torneo Reducido. The teams will be seeded in each round according to their final placement in the first stage of the tournament. The first rounds are played over a single leg, at the stadium of the higher-seeded team, whilst the final will be played as a single match on neutral ground. In all rounds except for the final, the higher-seeded team will advance in case of a tie, with extra time and a penalty shoot-out set to be played in case of a draw in the final.

Pos	Team	Pld	W	D	L	GF	GA	GD	Pts	Qualification
1	Olimpo	32	20	10	2	58	20	+38	70	Qualified first from First Stage
2	Douglas Haig	32	20	7	5	43	22	+21	67	Qualified first from First Stage
3	Ciudad de Bolivar	32	17	8	7	45	25	+20	59	Qualified first from First Stage
4	Gimnasia y Tiro	32	16	11	5	32	17	+15	59	Qualified first from First Stage
5	Villa Mitre	32	19	10	3	55	15	+40	67	Qualified second from First Stage
6	Argentino (MM)	32	15	13	4	53	27	+26	58	Qualified second from First Stage
7	Central Norte	32	13	10	9	38	30	+8	49	Qualified second from First Stage
8	Independiente (Ch)	32	14	7	11	31	25	+6	49	Qualified second from First Stage
9	Juventud Unida Universitario	32	13	12	7	33	23	+10	51	Qualified third from First Stage
10	Sportivo Las Parejas	32	14	5	13	37	33	+4	47	Qualified third from First Stage
11	Cipolletti	32	13	8	11	35	34	+1	47	Qualified third from First Stage
12	Boca Unidos	32	12	10	10	31	36	−5	46	Qualified third from First Stage
13	Sportivo Belgrano	32	14	5	13	42	34	+8	47	Qualified fourth from First Stage
14	Sol de América (F)	32	12	9	11	33	29	+4	45	Qualified fourth from First Stage
15	Santamarina	32	11	11	10	33	31	+2	44	Qualified fourth from First Stage
16	Atenas (RC)	32	12	8	12	43	42	+1	44	Qualified fourth from First Stage

Source: AFA

=== First knockout round ===
November 5, 2023	Olimpo	2–0	Atenas (RC)	Bahía Blanca, Pcia. de Buenos Aires
16:30 UTC−3	Amarilla 59'; Affranchino 81'			Stadium: Roberto N. Carminatti; Referee: Joaquín Gil

November 5, 2023	Douglas Haig (bsr)	0–0	Santamarina	Pergamino, Pcia. de Buenos Aires
17:00 UTC−3				Stadium: Miguel Morales; Referee: Maximiliano Macheroni

November 5, 2023	Ciudad de Bolivar	3–1	Sol de América (F)	San Carlos de Bolívar, Pcia. de Buenos Aires
15:00 UTC−3	Vazquez 17'; Guerra 79'; Troncoso 90+7'		Osurak 46'	Stadium: Municipal Eva Perón; Referee: Juan Ignacio Nebietti

November 5, 2023	Gimnasia y Tiro	2–0	Sportivo Belgrano	Salta, Pcia. de Salta
16:00 UTC−3	Tallura 2'; Rojas 45+1'			Stadium: Gigante Del Norte; Referee: Mauricio Martín

November 4, 2023	Villa Mitre	1–0	Boca Unidos	Bahía Blanca, Pcia. de Buenos Aires
20:00 UTC−3	Cocciarini 88'			Stadium: El Fortín; Referee: Cristian Rubiano

November 5, 2023	Argentino (MM)	4–0	Cipolletti	Monte Maíz, Pcia. de Córdoba
15:00 UTC−3	Correa 25'; Guerreiro 37'; Vera 45'; Olmos 85'			Stadium: Modesto Marrone; Referee: Jose Sandoval

November 5, 2023	Central Norte	3–1	Sportivo Las Parejas	Salta, Pcia. de Salta
18:00 UTC−3	Magno 3', 34'; González 49'		Font 85'	Stadium: Padre Ernesto Martearena; Referee: Matías Billone

November 5, 2023	Independiente (Ch) (bsr)	1–1	Juventud Unida Universitario	Chivilcoy, Pcia. de Buenos Aires
17:00 UTC−3	Moreno 14'		Balmaceda 89'	Stadium: Raúl Orlando Lungarzo; Referee: Nahuel Viñas

=== Second knockout round ===
November 12, 2023	Olimpo	1–0	Independiente (Ch)	Bahía Blanca, Pcia. de Buenos Aires
16:30 UTC−3	Vila 25' (pen.)			Stadium: Roberto N. Carminatti; Referee: Maximiliano Macheroni

November 12, 2023	Douglas Haig	5–0	Central Norte	Pergamino, Pcia. de Buenos Aires
17:00 UTC−3	Cabalucci 1'; Johansen 45+6', 71', 75'; González 53'			Stadium: Miguel Morales; Referee: Álvaro Carranza

November 12, 2023	Ciudad de Bolivar (bsr)	1–1	Argentino (MM)	San Carlos de Bolívar, Pcia. de Buenos Aires
15:30 UTC−3	Roldán 20' (pen.)		Sánchez 40'	Stadium: Municipal Eva Perón; Referee: Bruno Amiconi

November 12, 2023	Gimnasia y Tiro	1–0	Villa Mitre	Salta, Pcia. de Salta
16:00 UTC−3	Tallura 7'			Stadium: Gigante Del Norte; Referee: Fabricio Llobet

=== Third knockout round ===
November 26, 2023	Olimpo	0–1	Gimnasia y Tiro	Bahía Blanca, Pcia. de Buenos Aires
17:00 UTC−3			Cérica 33'	Stadium: Roberto N. Carminatti; Referee: Nahuel Viñas

November 26, 2023	Douglas Haig	2–1	Ciudad de Bolivar	Pergamino, Pcia. de Buenos Aires
17:00 UTC−3	Avila 78'; Cuevas 90+3'		Vazquez 8'	Stadium: Miguel Morales; Referee: Gaston Monzon

=== Fourth knockout round ===
December 3, 2023	Douglas Haig	1–1 (1–3 p)	Gimnasia y Tiro	La Rioja, Pcia. de La Rioja
20:00 UTC−3	Johansen 34'		Sanabria 39'	Stadium: Carlos Augusto Mercado Luna; Referee: Bruno Amiconi

==== Promotion playoff ====
The loser of fourth knockout round will play a Promotion playoff against one team from Primera B Metropolitana.

December 9, 2023	San Miguel	0–0 (a.e.t.) (6–5 p)	Douglas Haig	Buenos Aires
20:00 UTC−3				Stadium: Estadio Ciudad de Vicente López; Referee: Juan Ignacio Pafundi

== See also ==
- 2023 Copa de la Liga Profesional
- 2023 Argentine Primera División
- 2023 Primera Nacional
- 2023 Primera B Metropolitana
- 2023 Copa Argentina
