= 2024 Torneo Federal A =

XII Torneo Federal A
- Season: 2024
- Champions: Central Norte (1st title)
- Relegated: Sansinena; Ferro Carril Oeste (GP); Defensores (P); Unión (S)
- Matches played: 535
- Goals scored: 1,022 (1.91 per match)
- Biggest home win: Santamarina 5-0 Sol de Mayo (June 2)
- Biggest away win: Defensores (P) 0-4 Douglas Haig (March 31)
- Highest scoring: Sportivo Las Parejas 6-1 Gimnasia y Esgrima (CdU) (May 5)
- All statistics correct as of December 1, 2024.

The 2024 Argentine Torneo Federal A was the twelfth season of the Torneo Federal A, the regionalised third tier of the Argentine football league system. The tournament is reserved for teams indirectly affiliated to the Asociación del Fútbol Argentino (AFA), while teams affiliated to AFA have to play the Primera B Metropolitana, which is the other third-tier competition. The competition was contested by 33 of the 36 teams that took part in the 2023 season, with no teams relegated from Primera Nacional and five teams promoted from Torneo Regional Federal Amateur. One team was promoted to Primera Nacional, other team qualified for a promotion playoff against a team from Primera B Metropolitana and four teams were relegated to Torneo Regional Federal Amateur. The season began on 24 March and ended on 1 December 2024.

== Format ==
=== First stage ===
The thirty-eight teams were divided into four zones, two with ten teams and two with nine teams in each zone and it was played in a round-robin tournament whereby each team played each one of the other teams two times. The teams placed 1st to 5th from each zone with ten teams, and the teams placed 1st to 4th from each zone with nine teams qualified for the championship stages. The remaining twenty-three teams qualify for the revalida stage.

=== Championship stages ===
==== Second stage ====
The eighteen teams were divided into two zones with nine teams each and it was played in a round-robin tournament whereby each team played each one of the other teams one time. The teams placed 1st and 2nd qualified for the third stage. The remaining fourteen teams qualified for the second phase of the revalida stage.

==== Third stage ====
The four teams play a two-legged tie and the winners advance to the fourth stage. The losing teams qualified for the third phase of the revalida stage.

==== Fourth stage ====
Both tie winners will play a final match on neutral ground to decide the champion and first promoted team to Primera Nacional. The losing team qualified for the third phase of the revalida stage.

=== Revalida stages ===
The revalida stage is divided in several phases: First, the twenty teams that did not qualify for the championship stages were divided into two zones and it was played in a round-robin tournament whereby each team played each one of the other teams one time. The teams placed 1st to 6th from each zone advance too the second phase.

==== Second phase ====
The twelve teams from the first phase of revalida stage and the fourteen team from the second stage of championship stage play a two-legged tie and the winners advance to the third stage.

==== Third to sixth phase ====
The thirteen teams from the second phase, the losing teams from the third stage and the losing team from the fourth stage of championship stages, play a torneo reducido, with teams seeded according to their previous results; playing a two-legged tie over the phases. The winner of the sixth phase played a promotion playoff against one team from Primera B Metropolitana.

=== Relegation ===
After the first phase of the revalida stage a table was drawn up with the points obtained in the first stage and the first phase of the revalida stage and the bottom two teams of each two zones were relegated to the Torneo Regional Federal Amateur, giving a total of four teams relegated.

== Club information ==
Locations of the 2024 season teams.
Yellow: Zone A; Blue: Zone B;
Green: Zone C; Red: Zone D.

=== Zone A ===
Team	City	Stadium
Cipolletti	Cipolletti	La Visera de Cemento
Círculo Deportivo	Cdte. Nicanor Otamendi	Guillermo Trama
Deportivo Rincón	Rincón de Los Sauces	Elías Moisés Gómez
Germinal	Rawson	El Fortín
Kimberley	Mar del Plata	José Alberto Valle
Olimpo	Bahía Blanca	Roberto Natalio Carminatti
Sansinena	General Cerri	Luis Molina
Santamarina	Tandil	Municipal General San Martín
Sol de Mayo	Viedma	Sol de Mayo
Villa Mitre	Bahía Blanca	El Fortín

=== Zone B ===
Team	City	Stadium
Argentino	Monte Maíz	Modesto Marrone
Atenas	Río Cuarto	9 de Julio
Ciudad de Bolivar	San Carlos de Bolívar	Municipal Eva Perón
Deportivo Camioneros	General Rodríguez	Hugo Moyano
Estudiantes	San Luis	Héctor Odicino – Pedro Benoza
Ferro Carril Oeste	General Pico	El Coloso del Barrio Talleres
Gutiérrez	General Gutiérrez	General Gutiérrez
Huracán Las Heras	Las Heras	General San Martín
Juventud Unida Universitario	San Luis	Mario Diez
San Martín	San Martín	Libertador General San Martín

=== Zone C ===
Team	City	Stadium
9 de Julio	Rafaela	Germán Solterman
Defensores	Pronunciamiento	Delio Cardozo
Defensores de Belgrano	Villa Ramallo	Salomón Boeseldín
Douglas Haig	Pergamino	Miguel Morales
El Linqueño	Lincoln	Leonardo Costa
Gimnasia y Esgrima	Concepción del Uruguay	Manuel y Ramón Núñez
Independiente	Chivilcoy	Raúl Orlando Lungarzo
Sportivo Belgrano	San Francisco	Oscar Boero
Sportivo Las Parejas	Las Parejas	Fortaleza del Lobo

=== Zone D ===
Team	City	Stadium
Boca Unidos	Corrientes	José Antonio Romero Feris
Central Norte	Salta	Doctor Luis Güemes
Crucero del Norte	Garupá	Andrés Guacurarí
Juventud Antoniana	Salta	Fray Honorato Pistoia
San Martín	Formosa	17 De Octubre
Sarmiento	La Banda	Ciudad de La Banda
Sarmiento	Resistencia	Centenario
Sol de América	Formosa	Sol de América
Unión	Sunchales	La Fortaleza

== First stage ==
=== Zone A ===
Pos	Team	Pld	W	D	L	GF	GA	GD	Pts	Qualification or Relegation
1	Olimpo	18	10	6	2	23	10	+13	36	Advance to Championship Stages
2	Villa Mitre	18	10	4	4	24	12	+12	34	Advance to Championship Stages
3	Germinal	18	8	9	1	24	12	+12	33	Advance to Championship Stages
4	Santamarina	18	6	7	5	20	15	+5	25	Advance to Championship Stages
5	Kimberley	18	5	10	3	15	11	+4	25	Advance to Championship Stages
6	Círculo Deportivo	18	6	3	9	18	28	−10	21	Advance to Revalida Stages
7	Sol de Mayo	18	6	3	9	17	30	−13	21	Advance to Revalida Stages
8	Deportivo Rincón	18	5	5	8	14	18	−4	20	Advance to Revalida Stages
9	Cipolletti	18	3	8	7	10	16	−6	17	Advance to Revalida Stages
10	Sansinena (Note: Sansinena retired from the competition before week 13 due to economic reasons, as a result they were relegated and lost all of their remaining matches by walkover 0-1.) (R)	18	1	5	12	8	21	−13	8	Relegated to Torneo Regional Federal Amateur

Source: AFA
Rules for classification: 1) points; 2) goal difference; 3) Head-to-head points; 4) goals scored; 5) away goals scored; 6) draw of lots.
(R) Relegated

==== Results ====
Home \ Away	CIP	CIR	DRI	GER	KIM	OLI	SAN	RSA	SOL	VMI
Cipolletti		2–1	1–0	1–1	0–0	0–0	0–0	0–1	2–0	0–1
Círculo Deportivo	2–1		3–2	0–0	0–1	3–1	1–0	1–3	2–0	1–1
Deportivo Rincón	1–0	1–0		2–2	0–0	1–2	1–0	1–0	2–0	1–1
Germinal	1–1	3–0	0–0		2–1	1–1	3–1	2–0	3–0	1–0
Kimberley	2–0	0–1	2–0	0–0		0–0	1–1	1–1	1–1	1–0
Olimpo	1–1	3–1	1–0	0–1	1–1		2–0	1–0	1–0	2–0
Sansinena	2–0	1–1	0–0	0–1	0–1	0–1		0–0	0–1	0–2
Santamarina	0–0	4–1	3–2	1–1	1–1	0–0	1–0		5–0	0–0
Sol de Mayo	1–1	3–0	1–0	2–2	3–2	0–3	2–1	2–0		0–2
Villa Mitre	2–0	2–0	2–0	2–0	0–0	1–3	3–2	2–0	3–1	

Legend: Blue = home team win; Yellow = draw; Red = away team win.

=== Zone B ===
Pos	Team	Pld	W	D	L	GF	GA	GD	Pts	Qualification or Relegation
1	Gutiérrez	18	10	5	3	19	12	+7	35	Advance to Championship Stages
2	Ciudad de Bolivar	18	10	2	6	22	12	+10	32	Advance to Championship Stages
3	Argentino (MM)	18	8	6	4	15	10	+5	30	Advance to Championship Stages
4	Deportivo Camioneros	18	7	6	5	21	14	+7	27	Advance to Championship Stages
5	Atenas (RC)	18	8	3	7	22	19	+3	27	Advance to Championship Stages
6	Juventud Unida Universitario	18	6	5	7	13	17	−4	23	Advance to Revalida Stages
7	San Martín (M)	18	6	4	8	10	12	−2	22	Advance to Revalida Stages
8	Huracán Las Heras	18	5	7	6	14	17	−3	22	Advance to Revalida Stages
9	Estudiantes (SL)	18	3	5	10	17	27	−10	14	Advance to Revalida Stages
10	Ferro Carril Oeste (GP)	18	2	7	9	7	20	−13	13	Advance to Revalida Stages

Source: AFA
Rules for classification: 1) points; 2) goal difference; 3) Head-to-head points; 4) goals scored; 5) away goals scored; 6) draw of lots.

==== Results ====
Home \ Away	ARG	ATE	CIU	DEP	ESL	FCO	GUT	HLH	JUU	SMA
Argentino (MM)		2–3	1–1	1–1	2–0	1–0	1–0	0–0	1–0	1–0
Atenas (RC)	1–0		1–0	2–2	4–2	1–0	1–1	1–0	4–1	0–1
Ciudad de Bolivar	1–0	1–0		0–1	2–1	3–0	2–1	2–1	1–0	1–0
Deportivo Camioneros	1–2	2–0	0–2		3–1	0–1	0–0	3–1	2–0	0–1
Estudiantes (SL)	1–2	2–1	1–1	0–1		1–1	1–1	1–1	0–1	3–1
Ferro Carril Oeste (GP)	0–0	0–0	0–4	1–1	1–2		1–2	0–0	0–1	1–0
Gutiérrez	1–0	2–1	1–0	1–1	1–0	2–1		0–1	2–2	1–0
Huracán Las Heras	0–0	2–0	2–1	0–3	2–1	0–0	0–1		1–2	1–0
Juventud Unida Universitario	0–0	0–2	1–0	1–0	0–0	2–0	0–1	1–1		1–2
San Martín (M)	0–1	1–0	1–0	0–0	2–0	0–0	0–1	1–1	0–0	

Updated to match(es) played on unknown. Source:
Legend: Blue = home team win; Yellow = draw; Red = away team win.

=== Zone C ===
Pos	Team	Pld	W	D	L	GF	GA	GD	Pts	Qualification or Relegation
1	Defensores de Belgrano (VR)	16	7	8	1	19	8	+11	29	Advance to Championship Stages
2	Sportivo Belgrano	16	8	5	3	13	5	+8	29	Advance to Championship Stages
3	9 de Julio (R)	16	7	5	4	20	15	+5	26	Advance to Championship Stages
4	Sportivo Las Parejas	16	6	5	5	19	13	+6	23	Advance to Championship Stages
5	El Linqueño	16	6	4	6	13	12	+1	22	Advance to Revalida Stages
6	Douglas Haig	16	4	7	5	14	13	+1	19	Advance to Revalida Stages
7	Independiente (Ch)	16	4	7	5	13	13	0	19	Advance to Revalida Stages
8	Defensores (P)	16	3	4	9	11	29	−18	13	Advance to Revalida Stages
9	Gimnasia y Esgrima (CdU)	16	2	5	9	9	23	−14	11	Advance to Revalida Stages

Source: AFA
Rules for classification: 1) points; 2) goal difference; 3) Head-to-head points; 4) goals scored; 5) away goals scored; 6) draw of lots.

==== Results ====
Home \ Away	9JU	DPR	DEF	DOU	ELI	GYE	ICH	SPB	SLP
9 de Julio (R)		2–1	0–2	4–0	2–1	3–1	0–0	1–0	0–1
Defensores (P)	3–1		1–0	0–4	2–1	1–1	0–0	0–3	0–1
Defensores de Belgrano (VR)	2–0	3–0		1–1	2–0	1–1	1–1	1–0	1–1
Douglas Haig	1–1	3–0	0–0		0–0	0–1	0–1	0–0	1–0
El Linqueño	0–2	4–0	2–2	0–1		1–0	0–0	1–0	0–0
Gimnasia y Esgrima (CdU)	1–2	1–1	0–1	1–1	0–1		0–0	0–1	1–0
Independiente (Ch)	0–0	3–1	0–0	2–1	0–1	3–0		0–2	2–4
Sportivo Belgrano	1–1	1–0	0–0	1–1	1–0	1–0	1–0		1–0
Sportivo Las Parejas	1–1	1–1	1–2	1–0	0–1	6–1	2–1	0–0	

Legend: Blue = home team win; Yellow = draw; Red = away team win.

=== Zone D ===
Pos	Team	Pld	W	D	L	GF	GA	GD	Pts	Qualification or Relegation
1	Central Norte	16	10	4	2	23	10	+13	34	Advance to Championship Stages
2	Sarmiento (LB)	16	10	3	3	23	11	+12	33	Advance to Championship Stages
3	Sol de América (F)	16	8	4	4	17	13	+4	28	Advance to Championship Stages
4	San Martín (F)	16	7	4	5	19	13	+6	25	Advance to Championship Stages
5	Juventud Antoniana	16	5	4	7	14	17	−3	19	Advance to Revalida Stages
6	Unión (S)	16	4	4	8	11	24	−13	16	Advance to Revalida Stages
7	Crucero del Norte	16	3	6	7	11	17	−6	15	Advance to Revalida Stages
8	Boca Unidos	16	3	5	8	13	19	−6	14	Advance to Revalida Stages
9	Sarmiento (R)	16	2	6	8	8	15	−7	12	Advance to Revalida Stages

Updated to match(es) played on 14 July 2024. Source: AFA
Rules for classification: 1) points; 2) goal difference; 3) Head-to-head points; 4) goals scored; 5) away goals scored; 6) draw of lots.

==== Results ====
Home \ Away	BOU	CNO	CRU	JUA	SAF	SLB	SAR	SOL	UNS
Boca Unidos		0–0	2–0	1–0	2–2	0–1	1–1	0–0	0–1
Central Norte	2–0		2–1	2–0	2–0	1–1	1–0	2–2	1–0
Crucero del Norte	1–1	0–1		0–0	1–3	1–0	0–0	2–0	0–0
Juventud Antoniana	2–0	1–1	0–0		1–0	2–1	2–0	1–2	3–0
San Martín (F)	1–3	2–1	2–0	2–0		1–1	2–0	0–0	3–0
Sarmiento (LB)	1–0	2–1	2–0	4–0	1–0		1–0	3–1	2–0
Sarmiento (R)	3–1	0–1	1–1	0–0	0–1	1–1		1–0	0–1
Sol de América (F)	2–1	0–1	3–1	1–0	1–0	1–0	1–0		3–1
Unión (S)	2–1	1–4	0–2	3–2	0–0	1–2	1–1	0–0	

Legend: Blue = home team win; Yellow = draw; Red = away team win.

== Championship Stages ==
=== Second stage ===
==== Zone A ====
Pos	Team	Pld	W	D	L	GF	GA	GD	Pts	Qualification or Relegation
1	Ciudad de Bolivar	8	5	2	1	8	4	+4	17	Advance to Semifinals of Championship Stages and qualification for Copa Argentina
2	Santamarina	8	4	2	2	11	6	+5	14	Advance to Semifinals of Championship Stages and qualification for Copa Argentina
3	Villa Mitre	8	4	2	2	9	9	0	14	Advance to Second phase of Revalida Stages and qualification for Copa Argentina
4	Argentino (MM)	8	4	1	3	13	10	+3	13	Advance to Second phase of Revalida Stages and qualification for Copa Argentina
5	Kimberley	8	3	3	2	12	10	+2	12	Advance to Second phase of Revalida Stages and qualification for Copa Argentina
6	Gutiérrez	8	1	5	2	8	12	−4	8	Advance to Second phase of Revalida Stages
7	Deportivo Camioneros	8	2	2	4	8	12	−4	8	Advance to Second phase of Revalida Stages
8	Germinal	8	2	1	5	7	9	−2	7	Advance to Second phase of Revalida Stages
9	Olimpo	8	1	2	5	4	8	−4	5	Advance to Second phase of Revalida Stages

Source: AFA
Rules for classification: 1) points; 2) Head-to-head points; 3) goal difference; 4) goals scored; 5) away goals scored; 6) draw of lots.

===== Results =====
Home \ Away	ARG	CIU	DEP	GER	GUT	KIM	OLI	RSA	VMI
Argentino (MM)		0–0		2–1				3–2	3–0
Ciudad de Bolivar			1–0	1–0		1–0		1–0	
Deportivo Camioneros	3–2				0–0	4–3	0–0		
Germinal			2–0		2–1	1–1	0–1		
Gutiérrez	2–1	2–2					1–1		1–1
Kimberley	2–1				1–1		3–2		2–0
Olimpo	0–1	0–1						0–1	0–1
Santamarina			1–0	2–1	4–0	0–0			
Villa Mitre		2–1	3–1	1–0				1–1	

Legend: Blue = home team win; Yellow = draw; Red = away team win.

==== Zone B ====
Pos	Team	Pld	W	D	L	GF	GA	GD	Pts	Qualification or Relegation
1	Central Norte	8	6	0	2	13	6	+7	18	Advance to Semifinals of Championship Stages and qualification for Copa Argentina
2	Sarmiento (LB)	8	5	2	1	5	2	+3	17	Advance to Semifinals of Championship Stages and qualification for Copa Argentina
3	San Martín (F)	8	4	3	1	9	6	+3	15	Advance to Second phase of Revalida Stages and qualification for Copa Argentina
4	Sportivo Belgrano	8	4	2	2	7	5	+2	14	Advance to Second phase of Revalida Stages and qualification for Copa Argentina
5	Sportivo Las Parejas	8	3	0	5	8	12	−4	9	Advance to Second phase of Revalida Stages and qualification for Copa Argentina
6	Sol de América (F)	8	2	2	4	6	7	−1	8	Advance to Second phase of Revalida Stages
7	Atenas (RC)	8	2	2	4	5	8	−3	8	Advance to Second phase of Revalida Stages
8	Defensores de Belgrano (VR)	8	0	5	3	3	6	−3	5	Advance to Second phase of Revalida Stages
9	9 de Julio (R)	8	1	2	5	3	7	−4	5	Advance to Second phase of Revalida Stages

Source: AFA
Rules for classification: 1) points; 2) Head-to-head points; 3) goal difference; 4) goals scored; 5) away goals scored; 6) draw of lots.

===== Results =====
Home \ Away	9JU	ATE	CNO	DEF	SAF	SLB	SOL	SPB	SLP
9 de Julio (R)		0–1	0–1		0–0				2–0
Atenas (RC)			1–2	1–1		0–1			1–0
Central Norte				1–0		2–0	1–0	3–0	
Defensores de Belgrano (VR)	1–1				0–0		0–0	0–0	
San Martín (F)		2–0	2–1			0–0			3–2
Sarmiento (LB)	1–0			1–0			1–0	0–0	
Sol de América (F)	2–0	1–1			0–2				2–0
Sportivo Belgrano	1–0	1–0			3–0		2–1		
Sportivo Las Parejas			3–2	2–1		0–1		1–0	

Legend: Blue = home team win; Yellow = draw; Red = away team win.

=== Third stage ===
Team 1	Agg.	Team 2	1st leg	2nd leg
Ciudad de Bolivar	0–1	Sarmiento (LB)	0–1	0–0
Central Norte	1–0	Santamarina	0–0	1–0

=== Fourth stage ===
October 6, 2024	Central Norte	0–0 (4–3 p)	Sarmiento (LB)	San Fernando del Valle de Catamarca, Pcia. de Catamarca
18:15 UTC−3				Stadium: Estadio Bicentenario Ciudad de Catamarca; Referee: Nahuel Viñas

Central Norte is promoted to Primera Nacional.

== Revalida Stages ==
=== First phase ===
==== Zone A ====
Pos	Team	Pld	W	D	L	GF	GA	GD	Pts	Qualification or Relegation
1	Deportivo Rincón	8	6	1	1	10	1	+9	19	Advance to Second phase of Revalida Stages
2	Juventud Unida Universitario	8	3	3	2	10	6	+4	12	Advance to Second phase of Revalida Stages
3	Ferro Carril Oeste (GP)	8	3	3	2	9	6	+3	12	Relegated to Torneo Regional Federal Amateur
4	Cipolletti	8	2	6	0	4	2	+2	12	Advance to Second phase of Revalida Stages
5	Estudiantes (SL)	8	3	3	2	10	10	0	12	Advance to Second phase of Revalida Stages
6	Huracán Las Heras	8	3	2	3	5	8	−3	11	Advance to Second phase of Revalida Stages
7	San Martín (M)	8	1	3	4	8	11	−3	6	Advance to Second phase of Revalida Stages
8	Sol de Mayo	8	1	3	4	7	14	−7	6	
9	Círculo Deportivo	8	1	2	5	6	11	−5	5	
10	Sansinena (Note: Sansinena retired from the competition before week 13 due to economic reasons, as a result they were relegated.) (R)	0	0	0	0	0	0	0	0	Excluded

Updated to match(es) played on September 8, 2024. Source: AFA
Rules for classification: 1) points; 2) Head-to-head points; 3) goal difference; 4) goals scored; 5) away goals scored; 6) draw of lots.
(R) Relegated

===== Results =====
Home \ Away	CIP	CIR	DRI	ESL	FCO	HLH	JUU	SMA	SOL
Cipolletti				1–1	0–0	1–0			0–0
Círculo Deportivo	1–1		0–1				1–1	2–0	
Deportivo Rincón	0–0			3–0			2–0	2–0	
Estudiantes (SL)		2–1			1–2	2–0			2–2
Ferro Carril Oeste (GP)		3–0	0–1					1–1	3–0
Huracán Las Heras		1–0	1–0		0–0				2–1
Juventud Unida Universitario	0–0			0–1	3–0	3–0			
San Martín (M)	0–1			1–1		1–1	1–2		
Sol de Mayo		2–1	0–1				1–1	1–4	

Legend: Blue = home team win; Yellow = draw; Red = away team win.

==== Zone B ====
Pos	Team	Pld	W	D	L	GF	GA	GD	Pts	Qualification or Relegation
1	Douglas Haig	9	5	4	0	14	7	+7	19	Advance to Second phase of Revalida Stages
2	Boca Unidos	9	5	3	1	12	9	+3	18	Advance to Second phase of Revalida Stages
3	Independiente (Ch)	9	4	4	1	17	10	+7	16	Advance to Second phase of Revalida Stages
4	Sarmiento (R)	9	3	4	2	6	6	0	13	Advance to Second phase of Revalida Stages
5	Gimnasia y Esgrima (CdU)	9	4	0	5	9	8	+1	12	Advance to Second phase of Revalida Stages
6	El Linqueño	9	2	4	3	5	8	−3	10	Advance to Second phase of Revalida Stages
7	Crucero del Norte	9	2	3	4	4	11	−7	9	
8	Juventud Antoniana	9	2	2	5	6	10	−4	8	
9	Unión (S)	9	1	4	4	11	11	0	7	
10	Defensores (P)	9	1	4	4	6	10	−4	7	

Updated to match(es) played on September 8, 2024. Source: AFA
Rules for classification: 1) points; 2) Head-to-head points; 3) goal difference; 4) goals scored; 5) away goals scored; 6) draw of lots.

===== Results =====
Home \ Away	BOU	CRU	DPR	DOU	ELI	GYE	ICH	JUA	SAR	UNS
Boca Unidos			2–1		2–0	2–1		2–0		1–1
Crucero del Norte	1–2					1–0	0–0	1–0		
Defensores (P)		0–0		0–2		0–1		2–1	0–1	
Douglas Haig	1–1	2–0					4–3		1–0	
El Linqueño		1–0	1–1	1–1			0–0		0–0	
Gimnasia y Esgrima (CdU)				0–1	2–0			2–0		1–0
Independiente (Ch)	4–0		1–1			3–2		1–0		4–2
Juventud Antoniana				1–1	2–1				2–0	0–0
Sarmiento (R)	0–0	1–1				1–0	1–1			
Unión (S)		5–0	1–1	1–1	0–1				1–2	

Legend: Blue = home team win; Yellow = draw; Red = away team win.

=== Second phase ===
Pos	Grp	Team	Pld	W	D	L	GF	GA	GD	Pts	PPG	Qualification
1	3º B	San Martín (F)	8	4	3	1	9	6	+3	15	1.88	Qualified from Championship Stages
2	3º A	Villa Mitre	8	4	2	2	9	9	0	14	1.75	Qualified from Championship Stages
3	4º B	Sportivo Belgrano	8	4	2	2	7	5	+2	14	1.75	Qualified from Championship Stages
4	4º A	Argentino (MM)	8	4	1	3	13	10	+3	13	1.63	Qualified from Championship Stages
5	5º A	Kimberley	8	3	3	2	12	10	+2	12	1.50	Qualified from Championship Stages
6	5º B	Sportivo Las Parejas	8	3	0	5	8	12	−4	9	1.13	Qualified from Championship Stages
7	6º B	Sol de América (F)	8	2	2	4	6	7	−1	8	1.00	Qualified from Championship Stages
8	6º A	Gutiérrez	8	1	5	2	8	12	−4	8	1.00	Qualified from Championship Stages
9	7º B	Atenas (RC)	8	2	2	4	5	8	−3	8	1.00	Qualified from Championship Stages
10	7º A	Deportivo Camioneros	8	2	2	4	8	12	−4	8	1.00	Qualified from Championship Stages
11	8º A	Germinal	8	2	1	5	7	9	−2	7	0.88	Qualified from Championship Stages
12	8º B	Defensores de Belgrano (VR)	8	0	5	3	3	6	−3	5	0.63	Qualified from Championship Stages
13	9º A	Olimpo	8	1	2	5	4	8	−4	5	0.63	Qualified from Championship Stages
14	9º B	9 de Julio (R)	8	1	2	5	3	7	−4	5	0.63	Qualified from Championship Stages
15	1º A	Deportivo Rincón	8	6	1	1	10	1	+9	19	2.38	Qualified from Revalida Stages
16	1º B	Douglas Haig	9	5	4	0	14	7	+7	19	2.11	Qualified from Revalida Stages
17	2º B	Boca Unidos	9	5	3	1	12	9	+3	18	2.00	Qualified from Revalida Stages
18	2º A	Juventud Unida Universitario	8	3	3	2	10	6	+4	12	1.50	Qualified from Revalida Stages
19	3º B	Independiente (Ch)	9	4	4	1	17	10	+7	16	1.78	Qualified from Revalida Stages
20	3º A	Cipolletti	8	2	6	0	4	2	+2	12	1.50	Qualified from Revalida Stages
21	4º A	Estudiantes (SL)	8	3	3	2	10	10	0	12	1.50	Qualified from Revalida Stages
22	4º B	Sarmiento (R)	9	3	4	2	6	6	0	13	1.44	Qualified from Revalida Stages
23	5º A	Huracán Las Heras	8	3	2	3	5	8	−3	11	1.38	Qualified from Revalida Stages
24	5º B	Gimnasia y Esgrima (CdU)	9	4	0	5	9	8	+1	12	1.33	Qualified from Revalida Stages
25	6º B	El Linqueño	9	2	4	3	5	8	−3	10	1.11	Qualified from Revalida Stages
26	6º A	San Martín (M)	8	1	3	4	8	11	−3	6	0.75	Qualified from Revalida Stages

Source: AFA
Rules for classification: 1) Points per game; 2) Performance in previous stage; 3) Goal difference; 4) goals scored; 5) Drawing of lots.

Team 1	Agg.	Team 2	1st leg	2nd leg
San Martín (F)	2–0	San Martín (M)	0–0	2–0
Villa Mitre	2–0	El Linqueño	1–0	1–0
Sportivo Belgrano	3–2	Gimnasia y Esgrima (CdU)	1–2	2–0
Argentino (MM)	2–1	Huracán Las Heras	0–0	2–1
Kimberley (bsr)	2–2	Sarmiento (R)	0–1	2–1
Sportivo Las Parejas	2–3	Estudiantes (SL)	1–1	1–2
Sol de América (F)	3–1	Cipolletti	0–0	3–1
Gutiérrez	1–2	Independiente (Ch)	1–2	0–0
Atenas (RC)	0–3	Juventud Unida Universitario	0–3	0–0
Deportivo Camioneros	6–5	Boca Unidos	2–4	4–1
Germinal (bsr)	2–2	Douglas Haig	1–1	1–1
Defensores de Belgrano (VR)	3–2	Deportivo Rincón	2–0	1–2
Olimpo (bsr)	3–3	9 de Julio (R)	1–3	2–0

=== Third to sixth phase ===
Pos	Grp	Team	Pld	W	D	L	GF	GA	GD	Pts	Qualification
1	F	Sarmiento (LB)	8	5	2	1	5	2	+3	17	Losing finalist from Championship Stages
2	SF	Ciudad de Bolivar	8	5	2	1	8	4	+4	17	Losing semifinalist from Championship Stages
3	SF	Santamarina	8	4	2	2	11	6	+5	14	Losing semifinalist from Championship Stages
4	3º B	San Martín (F)	8	4	3	1	9	6	+3	15	Qualified from Second stage of Championship Stages
5	3º A	Villa Mitre	8	4	2	2	9	9	0	14	Qualified from Second stage of Championship Stages
6	4º B	Sportivo Belgrano	8	4	2	2	7	5	+2	14	Qualified from Second stage of Championship Stages
7	4º A	Argentino (MM)	8	4	1	3	13	10	+3	13	Qualified from Second stage of Championship Stages
8	5º A	Kimberley	8	3	3	2	12	10	+2	12	Qualified from Second stage of Championship Stages
9	6º B	Sol de América (F)	8	2	2	4	6	7	−1	8	Qualified from Second stage of Championship Stages
10	7º A	Deportivo Camioneros	8	2	2	4	8	12	−4	8	Qualified from Second stage of Championship Stages
11	8º A	Germinal	8	2	1	5	7	9	−2	7	Qualified from Second stage of Championship Stages
12	8º B	Defensores de Belgrano (VR)	8	0	5	3	3	6	−3	5	Qualified from Second stage of Championship Stages
13	9º A	Olimpo	8	1	2	5	4	8	−4	5	Qualified from Second stage of Championship Stages
14	2º A	Juventud Unida Universitario	8	3	3	2	10	6	+4	12	Qualified from First phase of Revalida Stages
15	3º B	Independiente (Ch)	9	4	4	1	17	10	+7	16	Qualified from First phase of Revalida Stages
16	4º A	Estudiantes (SL)	8	3	3	2	10	10	0	12	Qualified from First phase of Revalida Stages

Source: AFA
Rules for classification: 1) Points per game; 2) Performance in previous stage; 3) Goal difference; 4) goals scored; 5) Drawing of lots.

==== Third phase ====
Team 1	Agg.	Team 2	1st leg	2nd leg
Sarmiento (LB)	4–1	Estudiantes (SL)	3–1	1–0
Ciudad de Bolivar (bsr)	1–1	Independiente (Ch)	0–1	1–0
Santamarina	3–0	Juventud Unida Universitario	0–0	3–0
San Martín (F)	1–3	Olimpo	0–1	1–2
Villa Mitre (bsr)	3–3	Defensores de Belgrano (VR)	1–3	2–0
Sportivo Belgrano	1–2	Germinal	0–2	1–0
Argentino (MM)	4–2	Deportivo Camioneros	1–1	3–1
Kimberley	1–2	Sol de América (F)	0–1	1–1

==== Fourth phase ====
Team 1	Agg.	Team 2	1st leg	2nd leg
Sarmiento (LB) (bsr)	2–2	Olimpo	1–1	1–1
Ciudad de Bolivar	0–1	Germinal	0–0	0–1
Santamarina	3–2	Sol de América (F)	0–1	3–1
Villa Mitre (bsr)	3–3	Argentino (MM)	1–2	2–1

==== Fifth phase ====
Team 1	Agg.	Team 2	1st leg	2nd leg
Sarmiento (LB)	3–1	Germinal	1–0	2–1
Santamarina	1–2	Villa Mitre	0–1	1–1

==== Sixth phase ====
Team 1	Agg.	Team 2	1st leg	2nd leg
Sarmiento (LB)	3–2	Villa Mitre	0–1	3–1

== Relegation ==
=== Zone A ===
Pos	Team	First Stage Pts	Reválida Stages Pts	Total Pld	Total Pts	Relegation
1	Deportivo Rincón	20	19	26	39	
2	Juventud Unida Universitario	23	12	26	35	
3	Huracán Las Heras	22	11	26	33	
4	Cipolletti	17	12	26	29	
5	San Martín (M)	22	6	26	28	
6	Sol de Mayo	21	6	26	27	
7	Estudiantes (SL)	14	12	26	26	
8	Círculo Deportivo	21	5	26	26	
9	Ferro Carril Oeste (GP)	13	12	26	25	Torneo Regional Federal Amateur
10	Sansinena	8	0	8	8	Torneo Regional Federal Amateur

=== Zone B ===
Pos	Team	First Stage Pts	Reválida Stages Pts	Total Pld	Total Pts	Relegation
1	Douglas Haig	19	19	25	38	
2	Independiente (Ch)	19	16	25	35	
3	El Linqueño	22	10	25	32	
4	Boca Unidos	14	18	25	32	
5	Juventud Antoniana	19	8	25	27	
6	Sarmiento (R)	12	13	25	25	
7	Crucero del Norte	15	9	25	24	
8	Unión (S)	16	7	25	23	Torneo Regional Federal Amateur relegation play-off
9	Gimnasia y Esgrima (CdU)	11	12	25	23	Torneo Regional Federal Amateur relegation play-off
10	Defensores (P)	13	7	25	20	Torneo Regional Federal Amateur

==== Relegation play-off ====
September 22, 2024	Gimnasia y Esgrima (CdU)	2–0	Unión (S)	Pergamino, Pcia. de Buenos Aires
15:30 UTC−3	García 01', 14'			Stadium: Miguel Morales; Referee: Nelson Bejas

Unión (S) is relegated to Torneo Regional Federal Amateur.

== Second promotion final ==
Winners of Torneo Reducido of 2024 Primera B Metropolitana (Los Andes) and Sarmiento (LB), winner of "Reválida" stage, will play a match to define which team promote to the second division in order to play the 2025 Primera Nacional season.

21 December 2024	Los Andes	1–0	Sarmiento (LB)	Córdoba, Córdoba
17:00				Stadium: Estadio Julio César Villagra; Referee: Ariel Penel

Los Andes is promoted to Primera Nacional.

== See also ==
- 2024 Copa de la Liga Profesional
- 2024 Argentine Primera División
- 2024 Primera Nacional
- 2024 Primera B Metropolitana
- 2024 Copa Argentina
