= Matías Fantín =

Argentine footballer (born 1995)

Personal information
- Full name: Matías Orlando Fantín
- Date of birth: 21 November 1995 (age 30)
- Place of birth: Barranqueras, Argentina
- Height: 1.75 m (5 ft 9 in)
- Position: Midfielder

Team information
- Current team: Sarmiento

Youth career
- Sol de Mayo
- Unión Santa Fe

Senior career*
Years	Team	Apps	(Gls)
2013–2018	Unión Santa Fe	4	(1)
2018	→ Santamarina (loan)	2	(0)
2019	Colón de San Justo	8	(1)
2020–	Sarmiento	0	(0)
- * Club domestic league appearances and goals as of 15:53, 14 October 2020 (UTC)

Matías Orlando Fantín (born 21 November 1995) is an Argentine professional footballer who plays as a midfielder for Sarmiento.

== Career ==
Fantín started out in the youth of Sol de Mayo. In 2011, whilst with Unión Santa Fe's academy, he had a trial with Belgian side Anderlecht. In 2013, Fantín made his professional debut on 21 June 2013 during a 3–0 defeat away to Racing Club, which was his only appearance in the 2012–13 Argentine Primera División season which they ended with relegation. In Primera B Nacional, Fantín netted his first goal for the club as they drew at home to Banfield on 6 June. Two further appearances came across the next six campaigns, before the midfielder left on loan to play for Santamarina on 30 June 2018.

At the end of 2018, Fantín stood without contract after leaving Santamarina after his loan contract expired; just as his contract with Unión Santa Fe did. In January 2019, Fantín joined Colón de San Justo in Torneo Regional Federal Amateur. One goal in eight appearances followed. In mid-2020, Fantín signed for Sarmiento of Torneo Federal A.

== Career statistics ==
As of 14 October 2020.

Club statistics
Club	Season	League			Cup		League Cup		Continental		Other		Total	
Club	Season	Division	Apps	Goals	Apps	Goals	Apps	Goals	Apps	Goals	Apps	Goals	Apps	Goals
Unión Santa Fe	2012–13	Primera División	1	0	0	0	—		—		0	0	1	0
Unión Santa Fe	2013–14	Primera B Nacional	2	1	0	0	—		—		0	0	2	1
Unión Santa Fe	2014	Primera B Nacional	0	0	0	0	—		—		0	0	0	0
Unión Santa Fe	2015	Primera División	0	0	0	0	—		—		0	0	0	0
Unión Santa Fe	2016	Primera División	1	0	0	0	—		—		0	0	1	0
Unión Santa Fe	2016–17	Primera División	0	0	0	0	—		—		0	0	0	0
Unión Santa Fe	2017–18	Primera División	0	0	0	0	—		—		0	0	0	0
Unión Santa Fe	2018–19	Primera División	0	0	0	0	—		—		0	0	0	0
Unión Santa Fe	Total		4	1	0	0	—		—		0	0	4	1
Santamarina (loan)	2018–19	Primera B Nacional	2	0	0	0	—		—		0	0	2	0
Colón de San Justo	2019	Torneo Amateur	8	1	0	0	—		—		0	0	8	1
Sarmiento	2020–21	Torneo Federal A	0	0	0	0	—		—		0	0	0	0
Career total			14	2	0	0	—		—		0	0	14	2
