= Agustín Lastagaray =

Argentine footballer

Personal information
- Full name: Agustín Maria Lastagaray Toledano
- Date of birth: October 8, 1981 (age 45)
- Place of birth: Trelew, Argentina
- Height: 1.73 m (5 ft 8 in)
- Position: Forward

Team information
- Current team: C.D. FAS
- Number: 7

Youth career
- 2001–2002: Club Atlético River Plate
- 2002–2003: Independiente
- 2003–2004: Rosario Central

Senior career*
Years	Team	Apps	(Gls)
2004–2005	Quilmes	2	(0)
2005–2006	Villa del Parque	28	(4)
2006–2007	C.D. FAS	–	
2007–2008	El Linqueño		
2008-2009	Huracán de Tres Arroyos		
- * Club domestic league appearances and goals

Agustín María Lastagaray Toledano (born October 8, 1981) is an Argentine footballer who currently plays for El Linqueño in Torneo Argentino B. He started his professional career with Quilmes Atlético Club. In 2006, Lastargaray would be signed by Salvadoran Club C.D. FAS from a request of his former coach Julio Asad coached the team at the time.
