= Torneo Federal A =

Argentine association football league

- Founded: 2014; 12 years ago
- Country: Argentina
- Confederation: CONMEBOL
- Number of clubs: 38
- Level on pyramid: 3
- Promotion to: Primera Nacional
- Relegation to: Torneo Regional Federal Amateur
- Domestic cup: Copa Argentina
- Current champions: San Martín (F) (1st title) (2026)
- Most championships: Eleven clubs (1 title each)
- Broadcasters: Argentina: DeporTV; TV Pública; DirecTV Sports International: InTV Sports; InTV Max; TyC Sports; TNT
- Website: afa.com.ar/federala
- Current: 2026 Torneo Federal A

The Torneo Federal A (lit. 'Federal A Tournament') is one of the two professional leagues that form the regionalised third level of the Argentine football league system, along with Primera B Metropolitana. The competition was established in 2014 as a result of a change in the structure of the league system, replacing Torneo Argentino A.

Federal A is organised by "Consejo Federal", a division of the Argentine Football Association. Clubs in Federal A have indirect membership in AFA unlike clubs in Primera B, which have direct membership. All teams with indirect membership are from outside the city of Buenos Aires (playing in regional leagues) and its metropolitan area (Greater Buenos Aires), while most of the direct members are from the aforementioned area.

== Format (2026 season) ==
=== First stage ===
The thirty-seven teams were divided into four zones, one with ten teams and three with nine teams in each zone and it was played in a round-robin tournament whereby each team played each one of the other teams two times. The teams placed 1st to 5th from each zone with ten teams, and the teams placed 1st to 4th from each zone with nine teams qualified for the championship stages. The remaining twenty teams qualify for the revalida stage.

=== Championship stages ===
==== Second stage ====
The eighteen teams were divided into two zones with nine teams each and it was played in a round-robin tournament whereby each team played each one of the other teams one time. The teams placed 1st to 4th qualified for the third stage. The remaining ten teams qualified for the second phase of the revalida stage.

==== Third stage ====
The eight teams play a two-legged tie and the winners advance to the fourth stage. The losing teams qualified for the second phase of the revalida stage.

==== Fourth stage ====
The four teams play a two-legged tie and the winners advance to the fourth stage. The losing teams qualified for the third phase of the revalida stage.

==== Fourth stage ====
Both tie winners will play a final match on neutral ground to decide the champion and first promoted team to Primera Nacional. The losing team qualified for the third phase of the revalida stage.

=== Revalida stages ===
The revalida stage is divided in several phases: First, the twenty teams that did not qualify for the championship stages were divided into two zones and it was played in a round-robin tournament whereby each team played each one of the other teams one time. The teams placed 1st to 6th from each zone advance too the second phase.

==== Second phase ====
The twelve teams from the first phase of revalida stage and the fourteen teams from the second and third stages of championship stages play a two-legged tie and the winners advance to the third phase.

==== Third to sixth phase ====
The thirteen teams from the second phase, the losing teams from the fourth, fifth and sixth stage of championship stages, play a torneo reducido, with teams seeded according to their previous results; playing a two-legged tie over the phases. The winner of the sixth phase is promoted to Primera Nacional.

=== Relegation ===
After the first phase of the revalida stage a table was drawn up with the points obtained in the first stage and the first phase of the revalida stage and the bottom two teams of each two zones were relegated to the Torneo Regional Federal Amateur, giving a total of four teams relegated.

== Participating teams (2026 season) ==
=== Zone A ===
| Team | City | Province | Stadium |
|---|---|---|---|
| 9 de Julio | Rafaela | Santa Fe | Germán Solterman |
| Atlético Escobar | Ingeniero Maschwitz | Buenos Aires | Armenia |
| Defensores de Belgrano | Villa Ramallo | Buenos Aires | Salomón Boeseldín |
| Douglas Haig | Pergamino | Buenos Aires | Miguel Morales |
| El Linqueño | Lincoln | Buenos Aires | Leonardo Costa |
| Gimnasia y Esgrima | Chivilcoy | Buenos Aires | José María Paz |
| Gimnasia y Esgrima | Concepción del Uruguay | Entre Ríos | Manuel y Ramón Núñez |
| Independiente | Chivilcoy | Buenos Aires | Raúl Orlando Lungarzo |
| Sportivo Belgrano | San Francisco | Córdoba | Oscar Boero |
| Sportivo Las Parejas | Las Parejas | Santa Fe | Fortaleza del Lobo |

=== Zone B ===
| Team | City | Province | Stadium |
|---|---|---|---|
| Bartolomé Mitre | Posadas | Misiones | Ernesto Tito Cucchiaroni |
| Boca Unidos | Corrientes | Corrientes | Leoncio Benítez |
| Defensores de Vilelas | Puerto Vilelas | Chaco | Estadio Vilelas |
| Juventud Antoniana | Salta | Salta | Fray Honorato Pistoia |
| San Martín | Formosa | Formosa | 17 de Octubre |
| Sarmiento | La Banda | Santiago del Estero | Ciudad de La Banda |
| Sarmiento | Resistencia | Chaco | Centenario |
| Sol de América | Formosa | Formosa | Sol de América |
| Tucumán Central | San Miguel de Tucumán | Tucumán | Estadio Tucumán Central |

=== Zone C ===
| Team | City | Province | Stadium |
|---|---|---|---|
| Argentino | Monte Maíz | Córdoba | Modesto Marrone |
| Atenas | Río Cuarto | Córdoba | 9 de Julio |
| Cipolletti | Cipolletti | Río Negro | La Visera de Cemento |
| Costa Brava | General Pico | La Pampa | Nuevo Pacaembú |
| Deportivo Rincón | Rincón de Los Sauces | Neuquén | Elías Moisés Gómez |
| FADEP | Russell | Mendoza | Predio Social y Deportivo FADEP |
| Huracán Las Heras | Las Heras | Mendoza | General San Martín |
| Juventud Unida Universitario | San Luis | San Luis | Mario Diez |
| San Martín | San Martín | Mendoza | Libertador General San Martín |

=== Zone D ===
| Team | City | Province | Stadium |
|---|---|---|---|
| Alvarado | Mar del Plata | Buenos Aires | Estadio José María Minella |
| Círculo Deportivo | Comandante Nicanor Otamendi | Buenos Aires | Guillermo Trama |
| Germinal | Rawson | Chubut | El Fortín |
| Guillermo Brown | Puerto Madryn | Chubut | Raul Conti |
| Kimberley | Mar del Plata | Buenos Aires | José Alberto Valle |
| Olimpo | Bahía Blanca | Buenos Aires | Roberto Natalio Carminatti |
| Santamarina | Tandil | Buenos Aires | Municipal General San Martín |
| Sol de Mayo | Viedma | Río Negro | El Coliseo |
| Villa Mitre | Bahía Blanca | Buenos Aires | El Fortín |

== List of champions ==
In brackets, the number of titles won to date

| Ed. | Season | Champion/s | Also Promoted |
|---|---|---|---|
| 1 | 2014 | — (Note: Because of being a transicional tournament, the competition had the unusual number of seven clubs promoted to Primera B Nacional and no relegations. They are listed as "winners", although no official champion was crowned.) | Central Córdoba (SdE); Estudiantes (SL); Guillermo Brown; Juventud Unida (G); Unión (MdP); Atlético Paraná; Gimnasia y Esgrima (M) |
| 2 | 2015 | Talleres (C) (1) | Juventud Unida Universitario |
| 3 | 2016 | San Martín (T) (1) | — |
| 4 | 2016–17 | Agropecuario Argentino (1) | Mitre (SdE) |
| 5 | 2017–18 | Central Córdoba (SdE) (1) | Gimnasia y Esgrima (M) |
| 6 | 2018–19 | Estudiantes (RC) (1) | Alvarado |
| 7 | 2019–20 | (abandoned) (Note: On 28 April 2020, AFA decided to abandon the competition and declare the season finished due to the COVID-19 pandemic. All official competitions were suspended since 17 March.) | |
| 8 | 2020 | Güemes (SdE) (1) | Deportivo Maipú |
| 9 | 2021 | Deportivo Madryn (1) | Chaco For Ever |
| 10 | 2022 | Racing (C) (1) | — |
| 11 | 2023 | Gimnasia y Tiro (1) | — |
| 12 | 2024 | Central Norte (1) | — |
| 13 | 2025 | Ciudad de Bolivar (1) | Atlético de Rafaela |
| 14 | 2026 | San Martín (F) (1) | |

== Titles by club ==
| Team | Titles | Years won |
|---|---|---|
| Talleres (C) | 1 | 2015 |
| San Martín (T) | 1 | 2016 |
| Agropecuario Argentino | 1 | 2016–17 |
| Central Córdoba (SdE) | 1 | 2017–18 |
| Estudiantes (RC) | 1 | 2018–19 |
| Güemes | 1 | 2020 |
| Deportivo Madryn | 1 | 2021 |
| Racing (C) | 1 | 2022 |
| Gimnasia y Tiro | 1 | 2023 |
| Central Norte | 1 | 2024 |
| Ciudad de Bolivar | 1 | 2025 |
| San Martín (F) | 1 | 2026 |

== Top scorers ==
=== Top scorers by tournament ===
| Season | Player | Team | Goals |
|---|---|---|---|
| 2014 | (Argentina) Hugo Troche | Sportivo Patria | 16 |
| 2015 | (Argentina) Gustavo Balvorín | Juventud Antoniana | 18 |
| 2015 | (Argentina) David Romero | San Lorenzo de Alem (C) (Note: Located in Catamarca Province.) | 18 |
| 2015 | (Argentina) Adrián Toloza | Mitre (SdE) | 18 |
| 2016 | (Argentina) Matías Zbrun | Libertad (S) | 13 |
| 2016–17 | (Paraguay) Pablo Palacios | Gimnasia y Esgrima (M) | 21 |
| 2017–18 | (Paraguay) Pablo Palacios | Gimnasia y Esgrima (M) | 21 |
| 2018–19 | (Argentina) Franco Olego | Defensores de Belgrano (VR) | 20 |
| 2019–20 | (Paraguay) Julio Cáceres | Chaco For Ever | 10 |
| 2020 | (Argentina) Nelson Romero | Güemes (SdE) | 6 |
| 2020 | (Argentina) Maximiliano Tunessi | Villa Mitre | 6 |
| 2021 | (Argentina) Bruno Nasta | Huracán (LH) | 17 |
| 2021 | (Argentina) Franco Coronel | Defensores de Belgrano (VR) | 17 |
| 2021 | (Argentina) Juan P. Zárate | Cipolletti | 17 |
| 2022 | (Argentina) Juan M. Amieva | Sansinena | 16 |

== Seasons in Torneo Federal A ==
- Note: Updated to 2026 season. Teams in **bold** currently playing in Torneo Federal A.

| Club/s | Seasons |
|---|---|
| **Cipolletti**, **Defensores de Belgrano (VR)**, **Sarmiento (R)** | 14 |
| **Gimnasia y Esgrima (CdU)**, **Juventud Unida Universitario**, **Sportivo Las Parejas** | 13 |
| **Sportivo Belgrano**, **Villa Mitre** | 12 |
| Ferro Carril Oeste (GP), **Juventud Antoniana**, Unión (S) | 11 |
| Defensores (P), **Douglas Haig**, **Huracán Las Heras** | 10 |
| **Boca Unidos**, Chaco For Ever, Deportivo Madryn, Estudiantes (SL), Gimnasia y Tiro, **Sol de Mayo** | 9 |
| **Círculo Deportivo**, Crucero del Norte, Deportivo Maipú, **Independiente (Ch)**, **Olimpo**, Sansinena, **Sol de América (F)** | 8 |
| **Alvarado**, Desamparados, **San Martín (F)** | 7 |
| Altos Hornos Zapla, Central Norte, Deportivo Camioneros, Deportivo Roca, Gutiérrez SC, Independiente (N), Juventud Unida (G), San Jorge (T), San Lorenzo (A) | 6 |
| **Argentino (MM)**, Ciudad de Bolivar, Libertad (S), Sportivo Patria, Sportivo Peñarol, Unión (VK), Unión Aconquija | 5 |
| **9 de Julio (R)**, **Atenas (RC)**, Atlético Paraná, **El Linqueño**, General Belgrano, **Germinal**, Gimnasia y Esgrima (M), Mitre (SdE), **San Martín (M)**, **Santamarina** | 4 |
| Concepción FC, **Deportivo Rincón**, Guaraní Antonio Franco, Güemes, **Guillermo Brown**, **Kimberley**, Racing (C), San Martín (T), **Sarmiento (LB)** | 3 |
| Alianza (CC), Américo Tesorieri, Andino, **Bartolomé Mitre (P)**, CAI, Central Córdoba (SdE), **Costa Brava**, Estudiantes (RC), **Gimnasia y Esgrima (Ch)**, Liniers (BB), Rivadavia (L), Talleres (C), Textil Mandiyú, Tiro Federal (BB), Tiro Federal (R) | 2 |
| 9 de Julio (M), Agropecuario Argentino, Atlético de Rafaela, **Atlético Escobar**, Ben Hur, **Defensores de Vilelas**, Deportivo Mandiyú, **FADEP**, **Tucumán Central**, Unión (MdP), Vélez Sársfield (SdE) | 1 |

== Notes ==
| Preceded by Torneo Argentino A | Torneo Federal A 2014–present | Succeeded by – |
