= Club Atlético San Martín =

Club Atlético San Martín may refer to:

- Atlético Club San Martín de Mendoza
- Club Atlético San Martín de Tucumán
- Club Atlético San Martín de San Juan
