= Luciano Ábalos =

Argentine footballer (born 1978)

Personal information
- Full name: Luciano Andrés Ábalos
- Date of birth: 13 March 1978 (age 48)
- Place of birth: Coronel Mon, Argentina
- Height: 1.74 m (5 ft 9 in)
- Position: Forward

Senior career*
Years	Team	Apps	(Gls)
1999–2000	Chacarita Juniors		
2000–2001	Atlético Tucumán	28	(7)
2001	Quilmes	16	(0)
2002	The Strongest	12	(1)
2002–2003	Chacarita Juniors		
2003–2004	San Martín SJ		
2004	Defensores de Belgrano	12	(4)
2005	Coronel Bolognesi	12	(1)
2005–2006	San Martín SJ		
2006–2007	Aldosivi	20	(4)
2008	El Linqueño		
2008	Aurora		
2009	Deportivo Maipú	6	(0)
2010	El Linqueño		
- * Club domestic league appearances and goals

Luciano Ábalos (born 13 March 1978) is a retired Argentine football striker.
