= Torneo Regional Federal Amateur =

- Founded: 2018; 8 years ago
- Country: Argentina
- Confederation: CONMEBOL
- Number of clubs: Variable
- Level on pyramid: 4
- Promotion to: Torneo Federal A
- Domestic cup: Copa Argentina
- Current: 2024–25 season

The Torneo Regional Federal Amateur (in English "Regional Federal Amateur Tournament") is one of the two professional leagues that form the regionalised fourth level of the Argentine football league system, along with Primera C Metropolitana. The competition was established in 2018 as a result of a change in the structure of the league system, replacing Torneo Federal B.

Federal Amateur is organised by "Consejo Federal", a division of the Argentine Football Association. Clubs in T.R.F.A. have indirect membership in AFA unlike clubs in Primera C, which have direct membership. All teams with indirect membership are from outside the city of Buenos Aires (playing in regional leagues) and its metropolitan area (Greater Buenos Aires), while most of the direct members are from the aforementioned area.

== List of champions ==
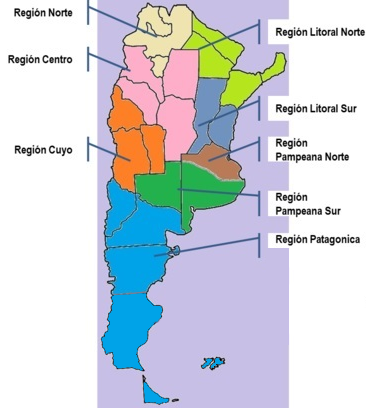
Distribution by region.

| Ed. | Season | Promoted |
|---|---|---|
| 1 | 2019 | Central Norte; Círculo Deportivo; Güemes; Sportivo Peñarol |
| – | 2020 | Canceled due to the COVID-19 pandemic |
| 2 | 2020–21 Transición | Racing (C); Gimnasia y Tiro; Independiente (Ch); Ciudad de Bolívar |
| 3 | 2021–22 | Argentino (MM); Liniers (BB); Atlético Paraná; Juventud Antoniana |
| 4 | 2022–23 | 9 de Julio (R); Atenas (RC); El Linqueño; Germinal; San Martín (M); Sol de América (F) |
| 5 | 2023–24 | Camioneros; Deportivo Rincón; Gutiérrez; Kimberley; Sarmiento (LB) |
| 6 | 2024–25 | Bartolomé Mitre (P); Ben Hur; Costa Brava; Gimnasia y Esgrima (C) |
