= Club Villa del Parque =

Argentine football club

Villa del Parque
- Full name: Club Social y Deportivo Villa del Parque
- Nickname: El León
- Founded: 29 March 1961
- Ground: Estadio Cacho Bandiera, Argentina under construction
- League: Liga de Fútbol de Necochea
Home colours	Away colours

Villa del Parque is an Argentine Football club in Necochea, in the Buenos Aires Province of Argentina. The club played in the regionalised 4th level of Argentine football Torneo Argentino B until 2007, when it resigned from the league.

== See also ==
- List of football clubs in Argentina
- Argentine football league system
