= Sarmiento de Resistencia =

Argentine sports club

Sarmiento
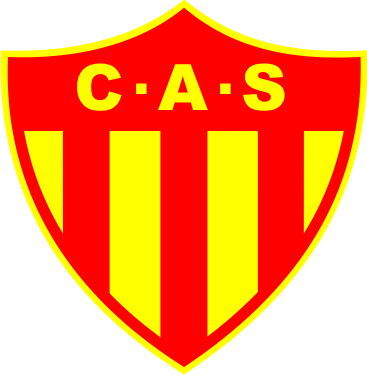
- Full name: Club Atlético Sarmiento
- Nicknames: El Aurirrojo; El Decano; El Rojo de Villa Alta
- Founded: 24 September 1910; 115 years ago
- Ground: Estadio Centenario, Resistencia, Chaco
- Capacity: 25,000
- Chairman: Mauricio González
- Manager: Miguel Urbina
- League: Torneo Federal A
- 2024: Torneo Federal A, Zone D, 9th
- Website: http://www.casarmiento.com.ar/
Home colours	Away colours	Third colours

Club Atlético Sarmiento is an Argentine sports club based in the city of Resistencia in Chaco Province. Although many sports are hosted at the club, Sarmiento is mostly known for its football team, which currently plays in Torneo Argentino B, the regionalised fourth level of the Argentine football league system.

Sarmiento played one season at the highest level of Argentine football, in the Torneo Nacional of 1977. Sarmiento finished 6th out of 8 teams in group C. The highlights of that campaign included a 2–0 win over Racing Club and 1–1 draws with River Plate and eventual finalist Talleres de Córdoba.

Other sports practised at the club are basketball, field hockey, martial arts, swimming, tennis and volleyball.

== Titles ==
- Torneo Argentino A: 1

1977
