= Sportivo Las Parejas =

Argentine sports club

Sportivo Atlético Club Las Parejas
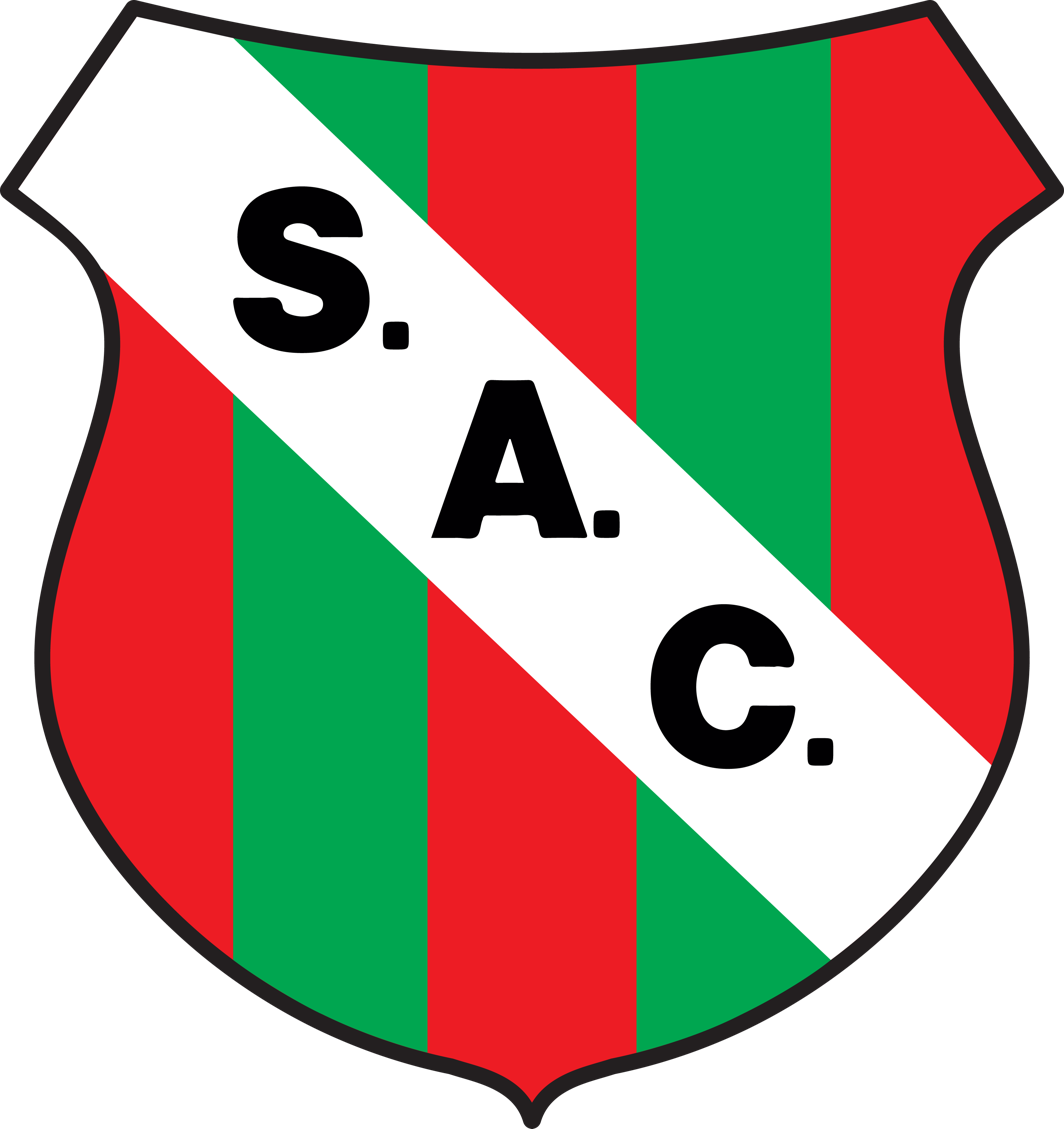
- Full name: Sportivo Atlético Club
- Nicknames: Lobo; Rojiverde
- Founded: March 18, 1922
- Ground: Estadio La Perrera, Las Parejas, Santa Fe Province, Argentina
- Capacity: 10,000
- League: Torneo Federal A
- 2010–11: 6th
- Website: http://www.sportivolasparejas.com
Home colours	Away colours

Sportivo Atlético Club is an Argentine sports club, from the city of Las Parejas, in the Santa Fe Province. Although many sports are practised in the club, it is mostly known for its football and basketball teams. The football squad currently plays in the Torneo Argentino B, the regionalised 4th division of the Argentine football league system).

== Titles ==
- Liga Cañadense de Fútbol: 19
  - 1949, 1950, 1954, 1955, 1957, 1966, 1982, 1992, 1995, Apertura 2003, Clausura 2003, Apertura 2005, Apertura 2006, Apertura 2011, Clausura 2011, Apertura 2013, Clausura 2013, Apertura 2014, Clausura 2014
- Campeón Torneo Federal B
  - 2015

== See also ==
- List of football clubs in Argentina
- Argentine football league system
