= Club Sportivo Estudiantes =

Sportivo Estudiantes
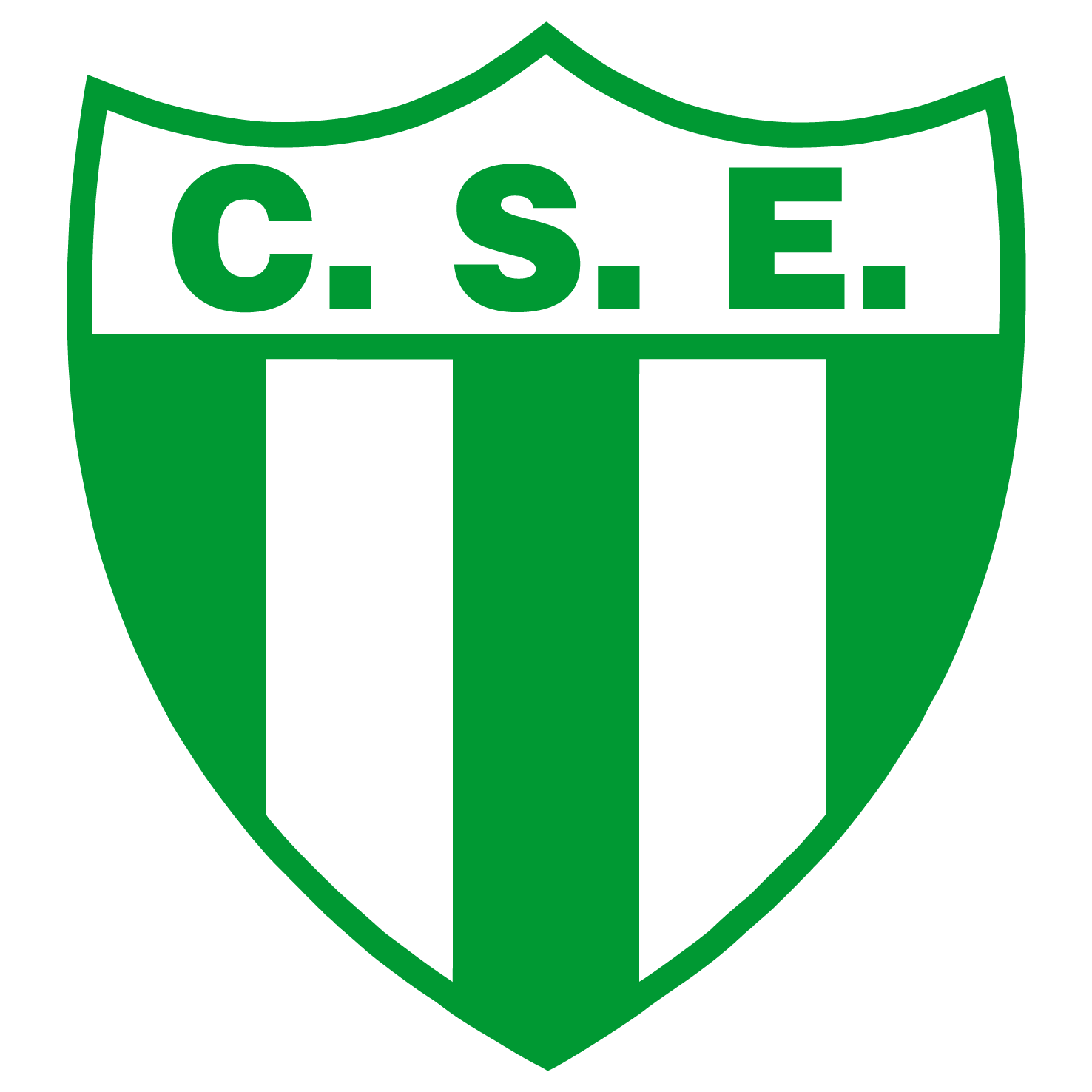
- Full name: Club Sportivo Estudiantes
- Nickname(s): Verde; Albiverde; Verde Puntano; El mas grande
- Founded: June 20, 1920; 105 years ago
- Ground: Héctor Odicino-Pedro Benoza (El Coliseo)
- President: Raúl Manavella
- Main Coach: Aldo Paredes – Sergio De La Fuente
- League: Torneo Federal A
- 2018–19: revalida
- Website: www.clubsportivoestudiantes.com
Home colours	Away colours	Third colours

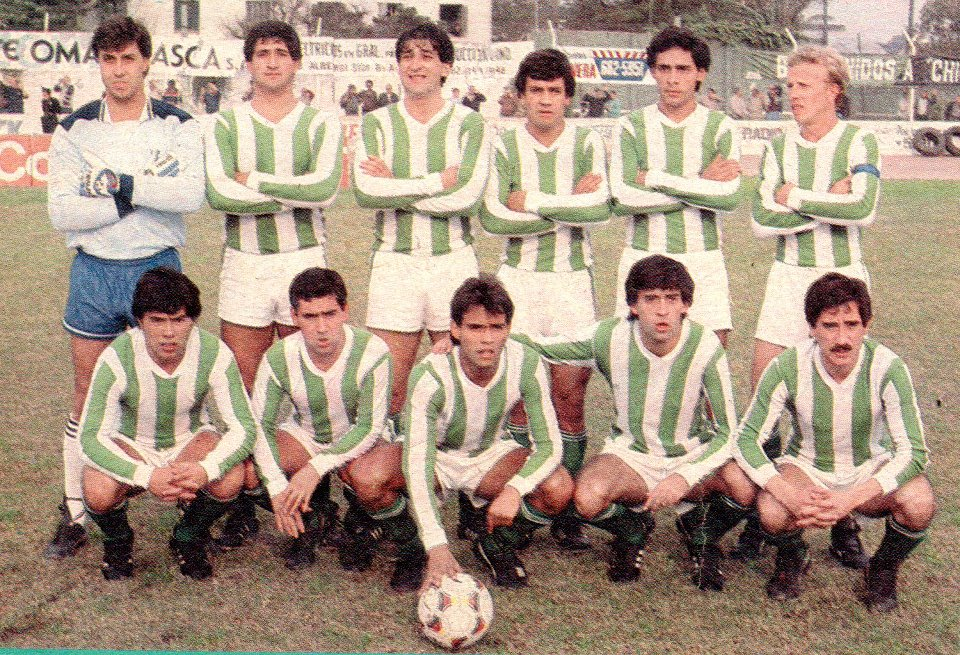
Sportivo Estudiantes team of 1989–90.

Club Sportivo Estudiantes is an Argentine association football club based in the city of San Luis in the homonymous province. The senior squad currently plays in Primera B Nacional, the second division of Argentine football league system.

Founded on June 20, 1920, the club belongs to regional Liga Sanluiseña de Fútbol, being the most successful team with 33 championships won. Estudiantes achieved promotion to Primera B Nacional after winning its group in the 2014 Torneo Federal A.

== History ==
The club was established at the initiative of a group of students of Escuela Normal Juan Pringles, on June 20, 1920. After commemorating the anniversary of Manuel Belgrano's death, they met to form a club, being Carlos Pino elected as president. The club was named "Sportivo Estudiantes" ("students" in Spanish), adopting the green and white colors that represented hope and purity respectively.

The Government of San Luis donated the club a land on Constitución street of the city. In August 1920 the "Unión Puntana de Football" (current Liga Sanluiseña) was established, being Estudiantes the first champion ever. The format was a single round-robin tournament, with all the games played at "Cancha del Internado" (located in the Infantry Regiment of the city).

Estudiantes' first venue was located on Bolívar street, between Sucre and San Juan streets. Estudiantes became the first club in the city to have its own stadium.

In the 2000s, Sportivo Estudiantes was notable for having won 3 consecutive promotions to upper divisions, starting with the 2012 Torneo Argentino C (5th division) championship until its most recent achievement when the team got promotion to the 2nd division, Primera B Nacional, in November 2014. With only one fixture remaining to the end of the Torneo Federal A season, Estudiantes qualified to play in the second division after winning Andino de La Rioja by 1–0. At the moment of achieving promotion, Estudiantes had won 10 games, with 2 draws and 2 losses. Darío Ortiz and Pablo Morant were the main coaches of the team. Before of that, Estudiantes had been won the Torneo Argentino B title in 2012, after a 1–1 draw to Atlético Policial in Catamarca.

== Honours ==
=== National ===
- Torneo Federal A (1): 2014
- Argentino B (1): 2012-13
- Argentino C (1): 2012

=== Regional ===
- Liga Sanluiseña (33): 1921, 1922, 1923, 1924, 1925, 1926, 1927, 1929, 1930, 1931, 1933, 1941, 1942, 1943, 1944, 1953, 1955, 1959, 1961, 1966, 1967, 1968, 1974, 1976, 1980, 1981, 1987, 1989, 1993, 1999, 2000a, 2000, 2007
