= Estadio Miguel Morales =

Football stadium in Pergamino, Argentina

Coordinates: 33°52′18.94″S 60°33′41.31″W

- Interactive map of Estadio Miguel Morales
- Full name: Estadio Miguel Morales
- Location: Pergamino, Argentina
- Capacity: 10,000
- Surface: Grass

Construction
- Opened: 1977

Tenant
- Club Atlético Douglas Haig

Estadio Miguel Morales is a stadium in Pergamino, Argentina. It has a capacity of 10,000 spectators. It is the home of Club Atlético Douglas Haig of the Primera B Nacional.
