= Sportivo y Biblioteca Atenas de Río Cuarto =

Argentine football club

Atenas
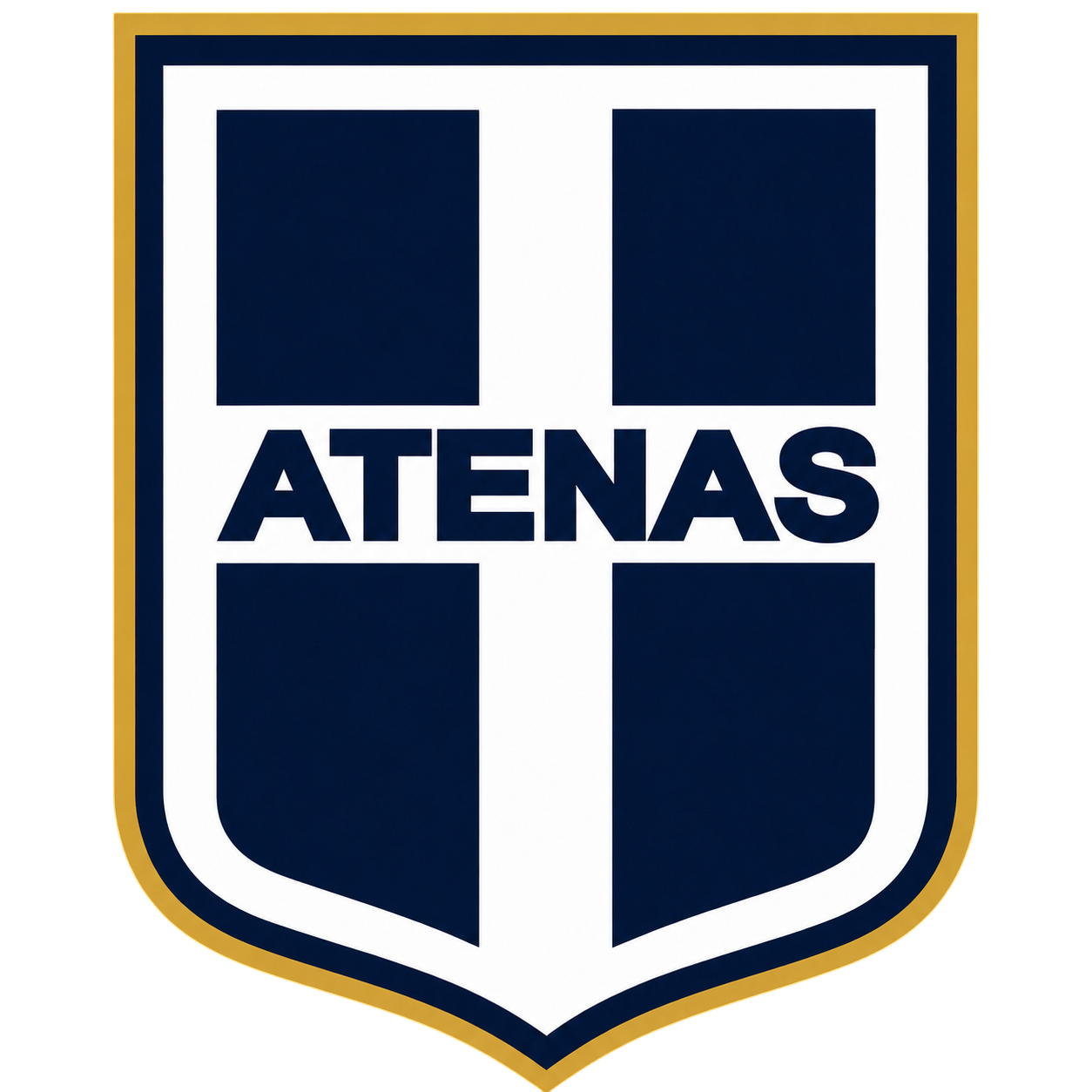
- Full name: Sportivo y Biblioteca Atenas
- Nickname: Los Albos del Imperio
- Founded: 1916; 110 years ago
- Ground: 9 de Julio
- Capacity: 7000
- League: Torneo Federal A
| Home colours | Away colours |

Sportivo y Biblioteca Atenas is a professional football club from Río Cuarto, Córdoba, Argentina. They were founded in 1916. As of the 2024 season they play in the Torneo Federal A (3rd level). In 2009/10 they reached the second phase of the Argentino B.

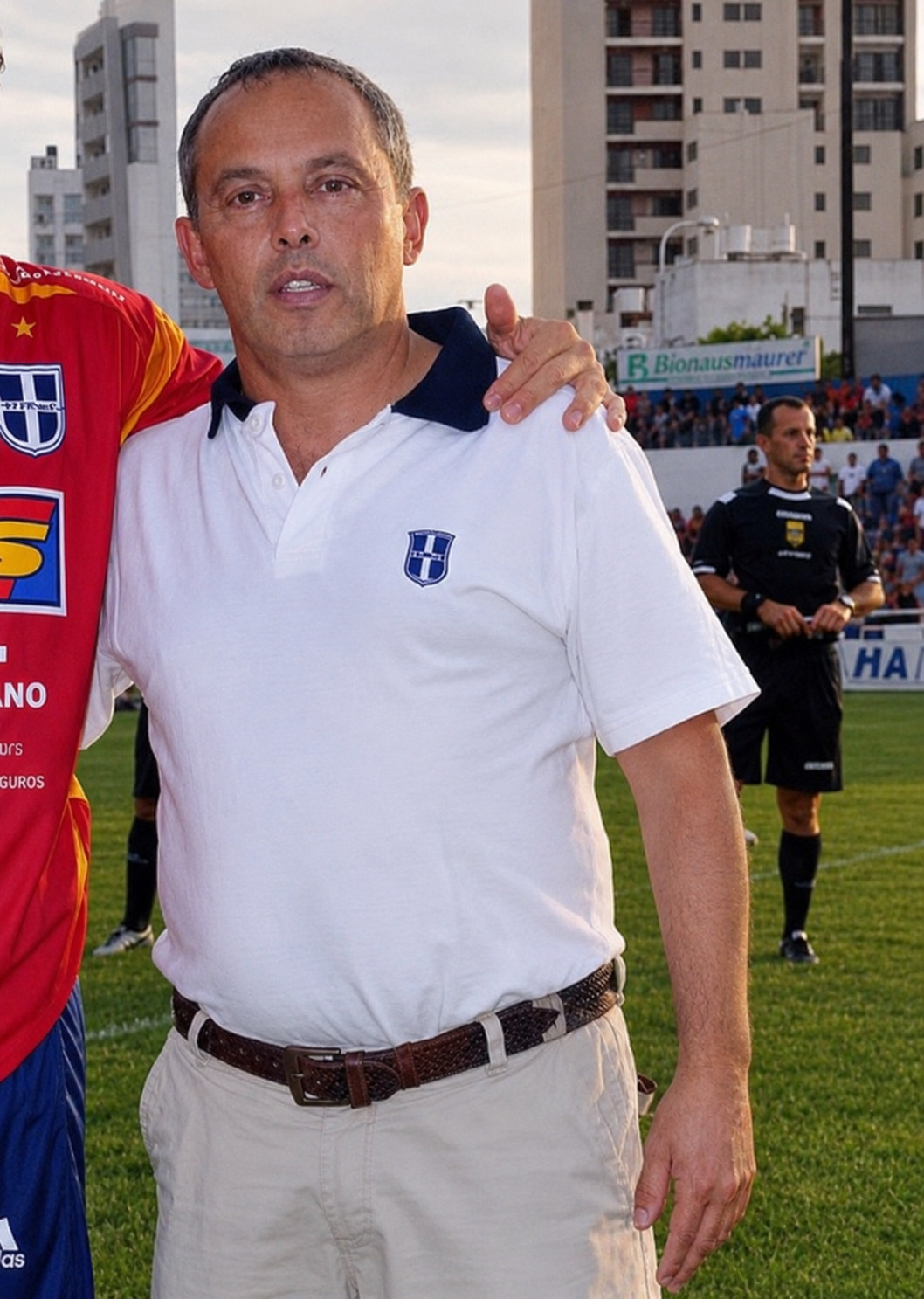
Daniel César Tosco, 33rd President of Club Sportivo y Biblioteca Atenas; distinguished term of office (2007–2014).

== See also ==
- Argentine football league system
