= San Martín de Mendoza =

Argentine football club

- Full name: Atlético Club San Martín
- Nickname(s): El Chacarero; Albirojo
- Founded: December 22, 1927
- Ground: Estadio San Martín; Mendoza Province, Argentina
- Capacity: 9,000
- Chairman: Alberto Ortíz
- Manager: Carlos Mazzola
- League: Torneo Federal A
- 2016: 4th
- Website: http://www.acsanmartin.com.ar/
Home colours	Away colours

Atlético Club San Martín (popularly known as San Martín de Mendoza) is a football club from the city of San Martín in Mendoza Province, Argentina. The team currently plays in the Torneo Federal A, which is the regionalised third division of the Argentine football league system.

== Overview ==
San Martín de Mendoza has played 8 seasons at the top level of Argentine football, more specifically in the Torneo Nacional tournaments of 1967, 1969, 1971–74, 1976, 1978. San Martín's best ever finish was a third position in its zone, achieved in 1974 and 1978.

San Martín was relegated from Primera B Nacional at the end of 2005–06 after losing the playoff against San Martín de Tucumán. The club was then found guilty of match-fixing in the 2006–07 season. Therefore San Martín was punished with a 10-point deduction, which left the team in the relegation zone. San Martín finally was relegated for a second time in a year, this time to the Torneo Argentino B.

== Honours ==
=== National ===
- Torneo Argentino A
  - Winners (1): 1996–97

=== Regional ===
- Primera A de Liga Mendocina
  - Winners (10): 1963, 1966, 1973, 1975, 1979, 1987, 1992, 2009, 2018, 2022

== See also ==
- Argentine football league system
- List of football clubs in Argentina
