= Club Atlético 9 de Julio =

Argentine football club

9 de Julio
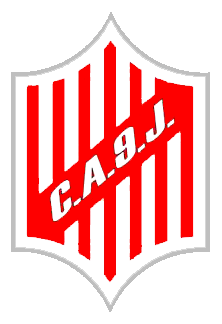
- Full name: Club Atlético 9 de Julio
- Nicknames: León; Decano; El 9 Juliense
- Founded: 9 July 1904; 121 years ago
- Ground: El Coloso, Rafaela; Santa Fe, Argentina
- Capacity: 7,000
- League: Torneo Argentino B
- 2010–11: relegated from Torneo Argentino A
Home colours	Away colours

Club Atlético 9 de Julio (mostly times referred as 9 de Julio de Rafaela) is an Argentine football club from the city of Rafaela in Santa Fe Province. The squad currently plays in Torneo Argentino B, which is the regionalised third tier of the Argentine Football Association league system.

== 2007 match agreement scandal ==
At the end of the Clausura 2007 tournament, 9 de Julio was kicked out from the quarter-finals of the promotion playoff and replaced by Juventud Antoniana. This came about because 9 de Julio was found guilty of having agreed to play a 1–1 tie with Central Norte, the other team from Salta, Argentina; this result was what both teams needed in order to qualify for the end of season playoffs. 9 de Julio was losing 0–1 and were awarded a penalty kick by the referee Juan Dardanelli in extra time.

The evidence against the clubs took the form of a video showing the agreement, which was broadcast on Argentine Sports channel TyC Sports. Germán Solterman, the coach, said in a radio interview that "I always knew they were recording me but he did not care about it". Other important testimony was given by the reporter Rolando Díaz of the Nuevo Diario of Salta. He stated in an interview that he had heard the referee saying to Soltermann: "I'm about to award a penalty kick for your team...".

As a result of the punishment received, 9 de Julio started the 2008 Apertura tournament with a deduction of six points and its manager, Germán Soltermann was banned from football activities for five years. The same punishment was also given to Central Norte coach, Víctor Riggio. The referee of the match, Dardanelli, was also banned.
