= Club Atlético El Linqueño =

El Linqueño
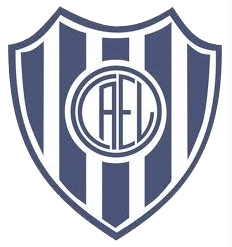
- Full name: Club Atlético El Linqueño
- Nickname(s): El León de Noroeste; El Azul
- Founded: June 6, 1915; 110 years ago
- Ground: Leonardo Costa; Lincoln, Buenos Aires, Argentina
- League: Torneo Federal A
- Website: http://xn--ellinqueo-s6a.com/
Home colours	Away colours

Club Atlético El Linqueño is a sports and social club that primarily plays football. It is located in the city of Lincoln, Buenos Aires, Argentina.
