= 1969 Copa Argentina final =

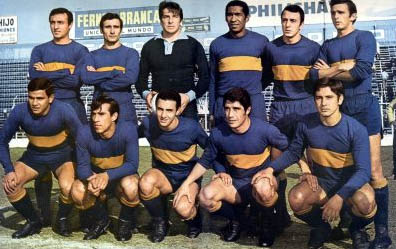
- Boca Juniors, champions
- Event: 1969 Copa Argentina
Atlanta	Boca Juniors
2	3
- on aggregate

First leg
Atlanta	Boca Juniors
1	3
- Date: 23 July 1969
- Venue: San Lorenzo Stadium, Buenos Aires
- Referee: Arturo Ithurralde

Second leg
Boca Juniors	Atlanta
0	1
- Date: July 27, 1969
- Venue: San Lorenzo Stadium, Buenos Aires
- Referee: Aurelio Bossolino

The 1969 Copa Argentina final was the final tournament of the 1969 Copa Argentina. The final was contested in two-legged format between Boca Juniors and Atlanta. Both matches were played at San Lorenzo de Almagro's venue, Estadio Gasómetro, located in Buenos Aires.

Boca Juniors won the first match 3–1, and Atlanta won the second match 1–0, but in the aggregate Boca Juniors won 32 to claim their first Copa Argentina Title. The champions was automatically qualified to the Copa Ganadores de Copa, but Boca had already qualified to 1970 Copa Libertadores, so the runners-up, Atlanta, took place in the competition.

== Qualified teams ==
Team	Previous finals app.
Boca Juniors	None
Atlanta	None

== Venue ==
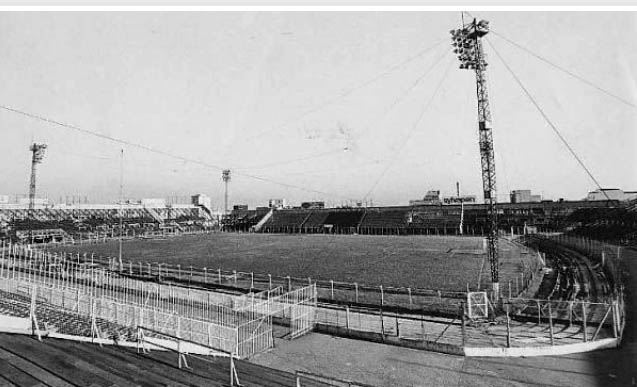
San Lorenzo Stadium hosted the series

The series were held in Estadio Gasómetro, home venue of C.A. San Lorenzo. Inaugurated in 1916, the stadium had a capacity of 75,000 people.

The stadium was nicknamed Gasómetro due to its exterior facade that reminded of a gas holder, very common at the time. The venue was the largest stadium of Argentina until the construction of El Cilindro, home venue of Racing Club de Avellaneda, inaugurated in 1950, with capacity for 100,000

Estadio Gasómetro was closed in 1979 and later demolished.

== Road to the final ==
Boca Juniors					Atlanta			
Opponent	Agg.	1st leg	2nd leg	Round	Opponent	Agg.	1st leg	2nd leg
Atlético Tucumán	3–2 (Note: Both matches were played in Tucumán Province.)	3–2 (A)	0–0 (A)	First round	Central Norte	3–1 (Note: Both matches were played in Salta Province.)	0–1 (A)	3–0 (A)
Sarmiento (LB)	7–3 (Note: Both matches were played in Santiago del Estero Province.)	3–1 (A)	4–2 (A)	First round	Altos Hornos Zapla	5–1 (Note: Both matches were played in Jujuy Province.)	2–1 (A)	3–0 (A)
Chacarita Juniors	3–2 (Note: Both matches were played at Racing Club Stadium.)	0–1 (N)	3–1 (N)	Second round	San Lorenzo	2–1 (Note: Both matches were played at Deportivo Morón Stadium.)	0–1 (N)	2–0 (N)
Colón	6–0	5–0 (A)	1–0 (H)	Semifinals	Rosario Central	4–2	2–1 (H)	2–1 (A)

== Match details ==
=== First leg ===
1969 Copa Argentina Finals
July 23, 1969
First leg

Atlanta	1–3	Boca Juniors
De la Iglesia 72'	Report	Ponce 18'; Madurga 53'; Peña 82'

San Lorenzo Stadium, Buenos Aires
Referee: Arturo Ithurralde

Atlanta	Boca Juniors

GK	1	(Argentina) Daniel Carnevali (c)
DF		(Argentina) Horacio de Filippo
DF		(Argentina) Oscar P. Gómez
DF		(Argentina) Rogelio Poncini
MF		(Argentina) Osvaldo Gutiérrez
MF		(Argentina) Eduardo Collado
MF		(Argentina) Rodolfo Vicente
MF		(Argentina) Carlos de la Iglesia
MF		(Argentina) Jorge Fernández
FW		(Argentina) Norberto Raffo
FW		(Argentina) Rodolfo Juárez
Manager:
(Argentina) José María Silvero

GK	1	(Argentina) Antonio Roma (c)
DF		(Argentina) Luis Raspo
DF	2	(Peru) Julio Meléndez
DF	6	(Argentina) Roberto Rogel
DF	3	(Argentina) Armando Ovide
MF		(Argentina) Norberto Madurga
MF		(Argentina) Raúl Savoy
MF		(Argentina) Antonio Cabrera
FW	7	(Argentina) Ramón Ponce
FW		(Argentina) Nicolás Novello
FW		(Argentina) Ignacio Peña
Manager:
(Argentina) Alfredo Di Stéfano

=== Second leg ===
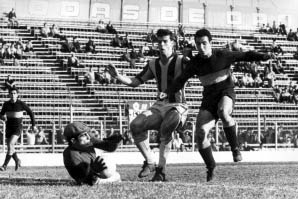
A moment of the match

July 27, 1969
Second leg

Boca Juniors	0–1	Atlanta
	Report	Collado 63'

San Lorenzo Stadium, Buenos Aires
Referee: Aurelio Bossolino

Boca Juniors	Atlanta

GK	1	(Argentina) Antonio Roma (c)
DF		(Argentina) Luis Raspo
DF	2	(Peru) Julio Meléndez
DF	6	(Argentina) Roberto Rogel
MF	3	(Argentina) Armando Ovide
MF		(Argentina) Norberto Madurga
MF		(Argentina) Raúl Savoy
MF		(Argentina) Antonio Cabrera
FW		(Argentina) Ramón Ponce
FW		(Argentina) Nicolás Novello
FW		(Argentina) Ignacio Peña
Manager:
(Argentina) Alfredo Di Stéfano

GK	1	(Argentina) Daniel Carnevali (c)
DF		(Argentina) Horacio de Filippo
DF		(Argentina) Oscar Gómez
DF		(Argentina) Rogelio Poncini
DF		(Argentina) Osvaldo Gutiérrez
MF		(Argentina) Eduardo Collado
MF		(Argentina) Rodolfo Vicente
MF		(Argentina) Carlos de la Iglesia
FW		(Argentina) Jorge Fernández
FW		(Argentina) Norberto Raffo
FW		(Argentina) Rodolfo Juárez
Manager:
(Argentina) José María Silvero

Boca Juniors won 3–2 on aggregate
