= SE Palmeiras in international football =

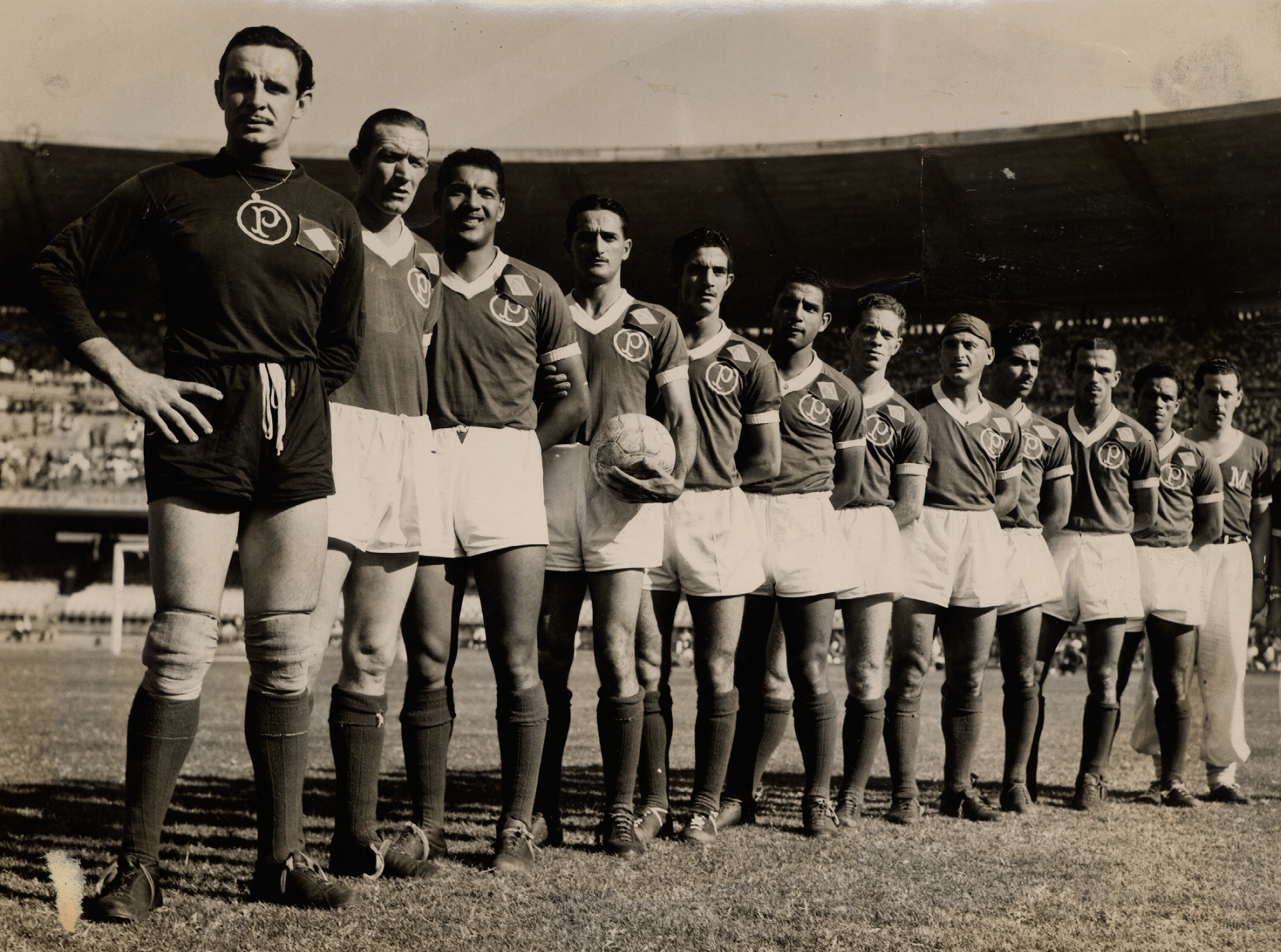
- Palmeiras' lineup that played the final of the Copa Rio and became world champions
- Club: Sociedade Esportiva Palmeiras
- First entry: 1951 Copa Rio
- Latest entry: 2025 FIFA Club World Cup

Titles
- Copa Libertadores: 3 (1999, 2020 and 2021)
- Recopa Sudamericana: 1 (2022)
- Copa Rio: 1 (1951)
- Copa Mercosur: 1 (1998)

Palmeiras is a Brazilian professional association football team based in São Paulo. It is one of the most successful and traditional Brazilian and South American teams in international club competitions. They have won one Copa Rio title which was recognized by FIFA as a club world competition in 2014, (Note: In 2014, FIFA recognized the Copa Rio 1951 as an official club world championship and Palmeiras as the first intercontinental and club world champions with several official documents. Even though it was still disputed afterward, FIFA has reaffirmed multiple times that Palmeiras is the first world champion and has remained as such.) three Copa Libertadores along with one Recopa Sudamericana and a Copa Mercosur for a total of six international trophies.

Their first participation in international competitions was in 1951, when they qualified for the first intercontinental and international club world competition as the Paulista champion, one of the biggest championships at the time. Palmeiras then debuted in the Copa Libertadores in 1961 being runners-up against Peñarol and the 1996 Copa CONMEBOL. In 1999, the club debuted in the former Intercontinental Cup against Manchester United. The club also debuted as champions of the first Copa Mercosur in 1998, debuted at the FIFA Club World Cup in 2021, and, additionally at the Copa Sudamericana in 2003. The club also debuted in the Recopa Sudamericana in 2021.

Palmeiras are also the Brazilian club with the most participations in club world competitions, participating 5 times, winning once in 1951 and participating in the 1999, 2020, 2021 and 2025 editions.

Palmeiras is also the Brazilian club with most participations in the Copa Libertadores, having participated in 26 editions; the Brazilian club with the most goals, wins and best goal difference in the Libertadores; and the Brazilian club with the third-most number of goals in club world competitions.

== History ==
=== First international conquest (1951) ===
Palmeiras, took part in the first international competition, the 1951 Copa Rio after winning the 1950 Campeonato Paulista which at the time was one of the biggest football competitions in the world, the idea of the competition was to gather together the reigning champions of the world's top football national leagues, to determine the world club champion. Along with Palmeiras several other clubs also participated such as, Vasco da Gama, Juventus, Austria Wien, Sporting CP, Nacional Montevideo, Red Star and Nice.

The Copa Rio Internacional was the first known club competition of intercontinental scope, including clubs from more than one continent, in its first edition (1951) it was officially called the Torneio Internacional de Clubes Campeões, and called the "Mundial de Clubes" and "Cup of Champions" by several Brazilian and other outside newspapers. The importance of the 1951 Copa Rio is linked to the fact that it was the first interclub competition with worldwide coverage, having been created even before the Intercontinental Cup. The competition was organized by the Brazilian Sports Confederation, with aid and authorization from FIFA, and was sponsored by the municipal government of Rio de Janeiro. As a result, FIFA states that Palmeiras is the de facto holder of the title of the first worldwide club competition in history, by stating in the 2022 competition that Palmeiras already had a title.

In any case, the Copa Rio was the first intercontinental and interclub football tournament to bring together the most prestigious and victorious clubs from the most important leagues around the world. The matches were played at the same locations in which the 1950 FIFA World Cup games had been played the year before in Brazil. The tournament triggered discussions within continental football federations about exploring club football more internationally, which eventually led to the launch of international championships such as the European Cup (now known as the UEFA Champions League) and the Copa Libertadores, which would lead later to the creation of the Intercontinental Cup.

The national football scene was one of sadness due to the loss of the 1950 World Cup title, at Maracanã, when it was decided to organize the International Club Tournament in the 1951 season, a competition that became popularly known as Copa Rio due to sponsoring reasons.

In order not to cool the passion of Brazilian fans for football, after the loss of the world title, the Brazilian Sports Confederation (currently the Brazilian Football Confederation) organized the International Club Tournament in 1951. Champions (same name written on the trophy), which later became known as the Copa Rio or "Taça Rio". The competition brought together the main national champions of Europe and South America. The Italians of Milan, Italian champion of 1950/1951, chose to participate in the contemporary Latin Cup, which in the 1951 edition was hosted in Italy – thus foreshadowing the trend European Union to value national or European competitions more than international club competitions, a trend that would also show itself later when the Intercontinental Cup and the FIFA Club World Cup were created and received less importance from Europeans than they attribute to the FIFA World Cup. Champions of Europe (the English did not participate in the projected 1951 "Champion Clubs Tournament" and the inaugural edition of the European "Champion Clubs Cup", but it later became an "obsession"). However, Milan, with several important foreign players scheduled to go on vacation due to contract, competed in the Latin Cup wanting Inter to go in their place.

Ottorino Barassi, president of the Italian Football Federation and General Secretary of FIFA, was appointed as the competition's mentor. According to reports at the time, he discussed the format with the Brazilian Sports Confederation and defined the participants. Palmeiras debuted in the competition on 30 June 1951, victorious against OGC Nice and topped the group. This was followed by a 2–1 victory against the then Yugoslavian team, Red Star, effectively confirming Palmeiras' qualification to the semi-final of the Copa Rio.

Palmeiras still had to face Juventus in a group stage match before advancing, in which the team lost in the tournament's biggest thrash, 4–0. Even with the incredible defeat against Juventus, the team defeated a strong Vasco da Gama team in Maracana 1–2 and then held a 0–0 tie on 15 July to qualify to the final of the Copa Rio. And in a shocking first leg, Palmeiras won Juventus 1–0 with a goal from Francisco Rodrigues. Finally, on 22 July 1951, Palmeiras tied with Juventus 2–2 with between 100,000 and 200,000 fans in the Maracanã and won the first intercontinental and international club world championship and on its first international debut.

==== Controversy ====
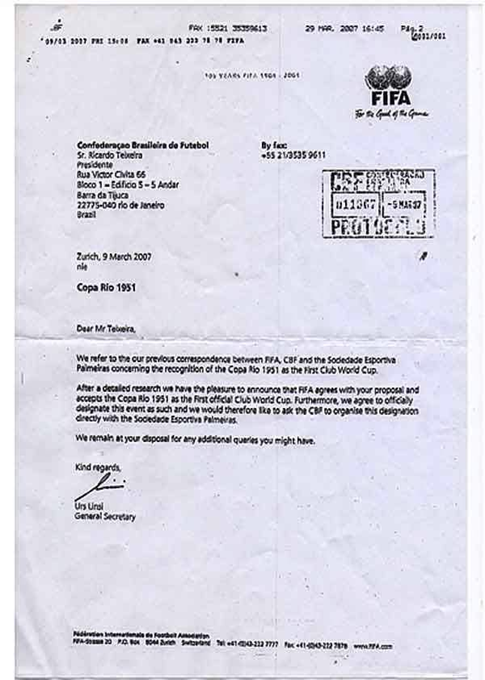
One of FIFA's official documents from 2007 confirming the Copa Rio 1951 as a club world competition

The competition was organized by the Brazilian Sports Confederation, with the assistance and endorsement of FIFA, and had this name on the trophy because it was sponsored by the City of Rio de Janeiro. FIFA declares that Palmeiras holds the title of the first world competition between clubs in history. Approved by the FIFA Executive Committee on 7 June 2014. However, without changing the nomenclature or unifying the competition with the current FIFA Club World Cup, just as the entity also does with the Intercontinental Cup in its reports. From 2017 until the beginning of 2021, the entity had stopped mentioning the world status of the 1951 Copa Rio, despite the recognition decision granted by its executive committee not having been revoked. With the entity starting to treat the competition, during this period, as the "first intercontinental club tournament". However, FIFA reposted, in January 2021, the 2016 article where the entity used the term "world" to designate the Palmeiras achievement. Then, she published an article about the great Palmeiras teams throughout the 20th century, highlighting the Copa Rio, where the three main FIFA directors at the time are mentioned, including president Jules Rimet, in the dream championship held in 1951 and also reposted the 2016 article for the second time with the term "world cup". A year later, in February 2022, FIFA once again treated Palmeiras as world champions in 1951. On 1 March 2024, it was announced that Palmeiras' museum outside Allianz Parque had received a translated "ata" document from FIFA with celebrations for the confirmation of the title as an official club world competition and S.E. Palmeiras as the first club world champions.

=== Libertadores finals (1961 and 1968) ===
In 1961, Palmeiras qualified for its first Libertadores on the second edition of the competition. In its group it only had Independiente from Argentina winning both the matches, eliminating Independiente and qualifying for the semi-finals in which they faced the Colombian team, Santa Fe winning them 6–4 on aggregate and advancing to the final where the team faced Peñarol. Palmeiras lost 2–1 on aggregate, but became the first Brazilian team to reach the final of the tournament.

The first leg was played on 4 June 1961, at the Centenario Stadium in Montevideo, where Peñarol would beat Palmeiras 1–0. While the second leg was played on Sunday, 11 June at the Pacaembú Stadium in São Paulo, where Palmeiras and Peñarol tied 1 to 1.

Peñarol was once again crowned champion, after having won the title in the first edition. He thus became the first two-time champion of America. In addition, they obtained the right to play in the 1961 Intercontinental Cup against Benfica of Portugal, and also automatically qualified for the next edition of the tournament.

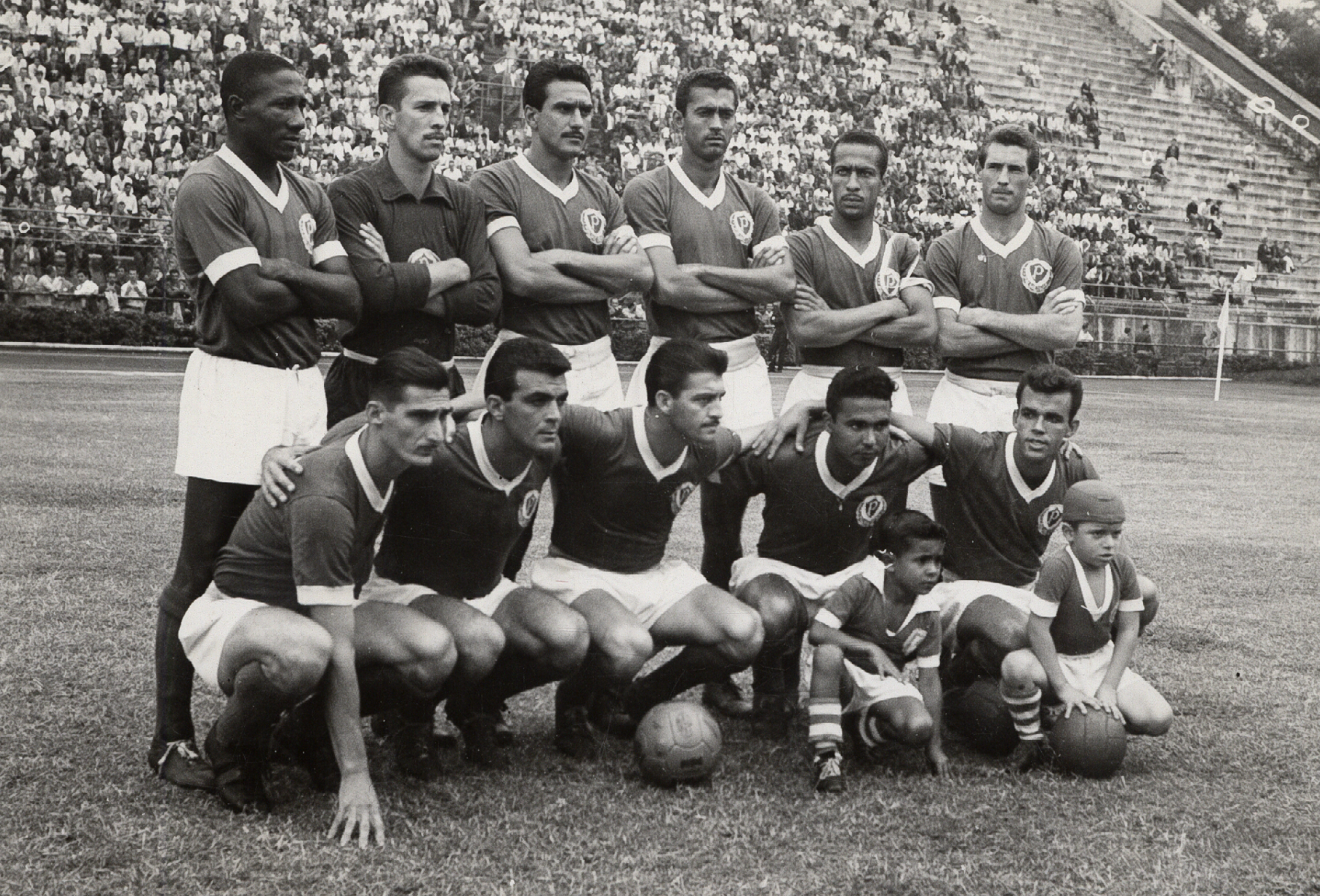
Palmeiras team in the 1960s

After 1961, Palmeiras then qualified for the Copa Libertadores of 1968 after winning the 1967 Campeonato Brasileiro. Palmeiras started off great, topping its group of four and advancing to the second round of which they also topped. In the semi-finals that team won, which at the time were the biggest winners of the competition. Palmeiras advanced to final, losing the first leg and winning the second leg. In playoffs Palmeiras suffered a 2–0 defeat and lost the final once again.

The first leg final was played on 2 May 1968, at the Jorge Luis Hirschi Stadium in La Plata, Argentina. In which the Argentine team beat the Brazilian team 2 to 1. The second leg final was played on 7 May 1968, at the Pacaembú Stadium, Brazil, in which the Brazilian team won 3 to 1. Because each team had won a game, they were equal on points so they had to play a third game on a neutral court. The tiebreaker was played on 16 May 1968, at the Centenario in Uruguay. The Argentine team beat the Brazilian team 2 to 0; and thus Estudiantes de La Plata won their first Copa Libertadores.

=== Ramón de Carranza Trophy ===
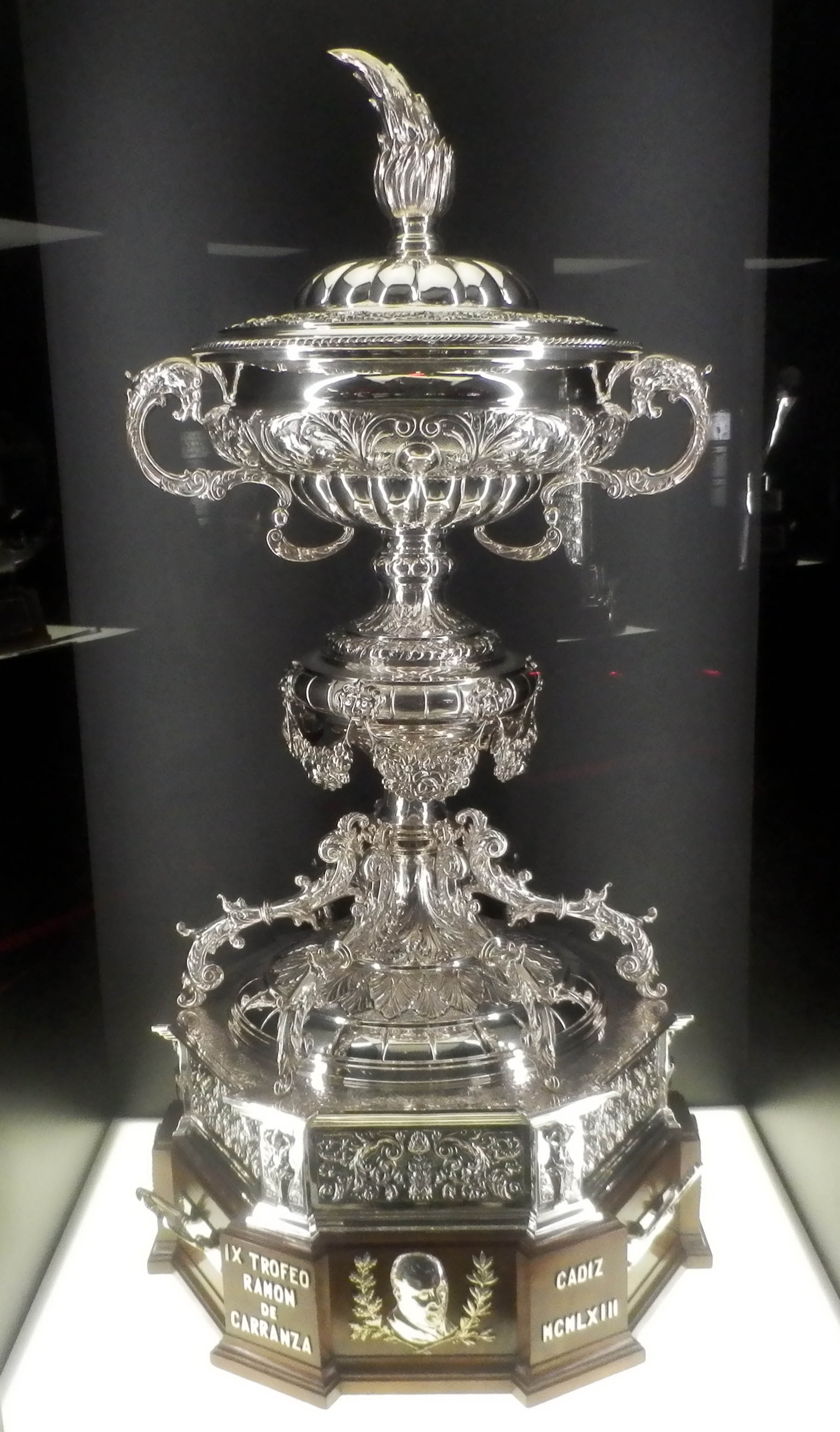
Ramón de Carranza Trophy

The Ramón de Carranza Trophy is a summer football competition that has been held in the city of Cádiz at the beginning of August since 1955, making it one of the most prestigious summer tournaments in Spain. It is one of the oldest alive football competitions in the world. The Big Green won the competition three times, in 1969, 1974 and 1975 and being second place in 1993.

Season	Opposition	Home	Away	Aggregate	Stadium
1969	(Spain) Real Madrid	2–0			Estadio Ramón de Carranza
1974	(Spain) Espanyol	2–1			Estadio Ramón de Carranza
1975	(Spain) Real Madrid	3–1			Estadio Ramón de Carranza

=== Back to the international stage and "Parmalat era" (1990s) ===
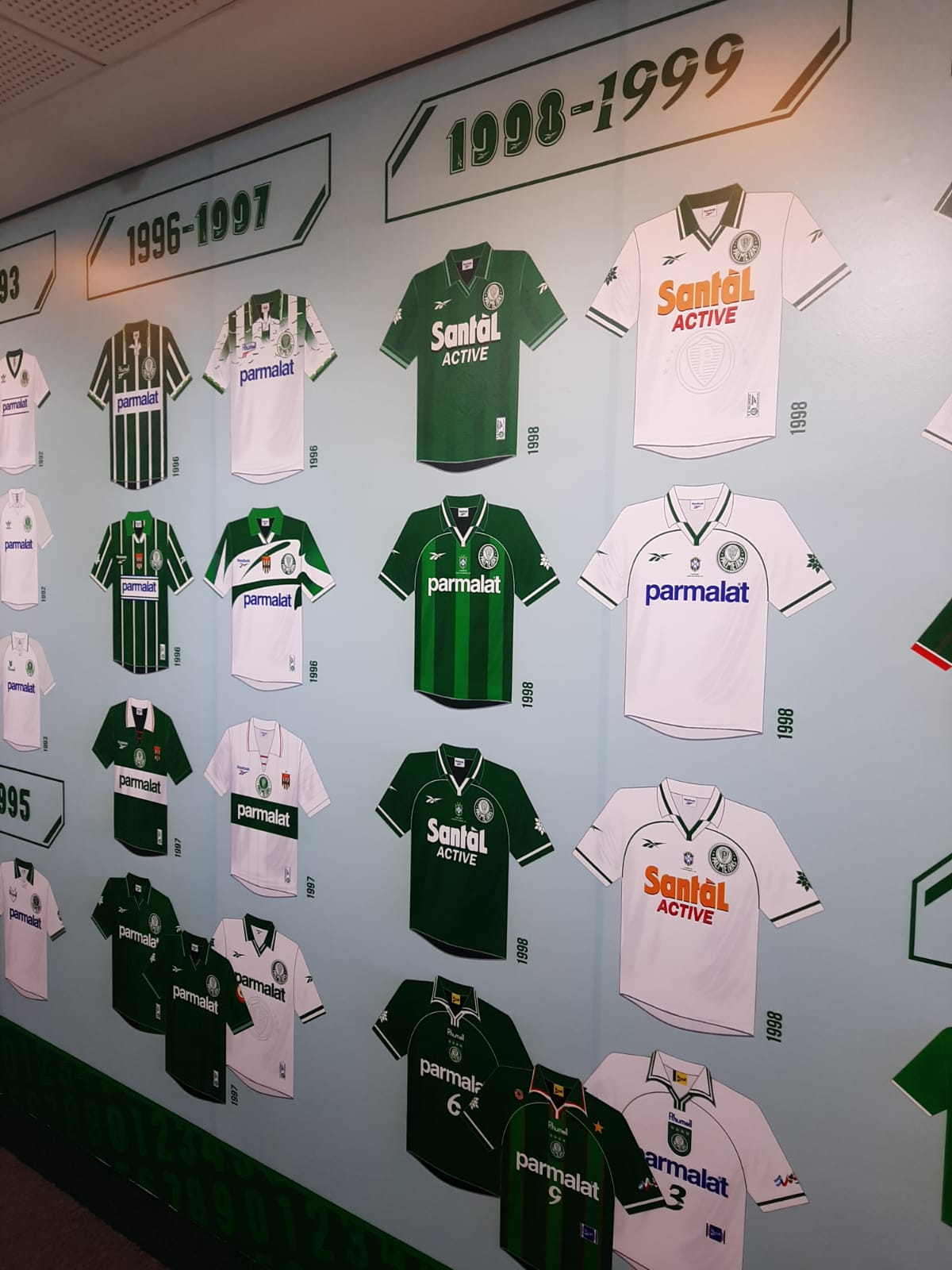
Palmeiras' jerseys during the Parmalat era

In 1991, Palmeiras won the 1991 Copa Euro-America on its first edition. An intercontinental tournament between German and Brazilian teams. Having made more points than its rival, Corinthians who ended up being the runner-up of the competition.

In 1993, Palmeiras after a 15-year hiatus from the Copa Libertadores, Palmeiras won the 1993 Campeonato Brasileiro and reached the Libertadores, being eliminated in the group stage by rivals São Paulo. In 1995, Palmeiras reached the quarter-finals but were again eliminated by a Brazilian team this time being Gremio.

Once again in 1996, Palmeiras won the Copa Euro-America, this time on its second edition. During the competition, Palmeiras made one of the biggest wins of South American teams on European teams in history. Winning a strong Borussia Dortmund team 6–1. With a hat-trick from Rivaldo. The runners-up this time was the Rio de Janeiro team, Flamengo.

==== The debut champion (1998) ====
In 1998, Palmeiras was one of 20 teams debuting in the first edition of one of South America's biggest competitions, the Copa Mercosur. Palmeiras had a remarkable journey to victory in the 1998 Copa Mercosur. They began with an excellent group stage performance, winning all matches and advancing to the quarter-finals. In the quarterfinals, they faced Boca Juniors and secured a 4–2 aggregate victory. The semi-finals they faced Paraguayan giants, Olimpia. Winning them 3–0 on aggregate after crowd confusion in Paraguay. And in the final won Cruzeiro who were then the defending champions of the Libertadores.

The 20 participants were divided into five groups of 4 teams, where each one faced their zone rivals under a double-round, round-trip league system. The teams in first place in each group and the three best seconds reached the quarterfinals, where the direct elimination system came into play. Up to and including the semi-finals, with equal points, the team with the best goal difference obtained the classification; If the tie persisted, shots were taken from the penalty spot. In the final, if the two teams had the same number of points after the first two games, a tiebreaker match would be played to define the champion.

==== The first Libertadores (1999) ====
Qualified for the 1999 Libertadores after winning the 1998 Copa do Brasil, Palmeiras fell into Group 3 of the competition, along with Cerro Porteño and Olimpia, both from Paraguay, and arch-rivals Corinthians.

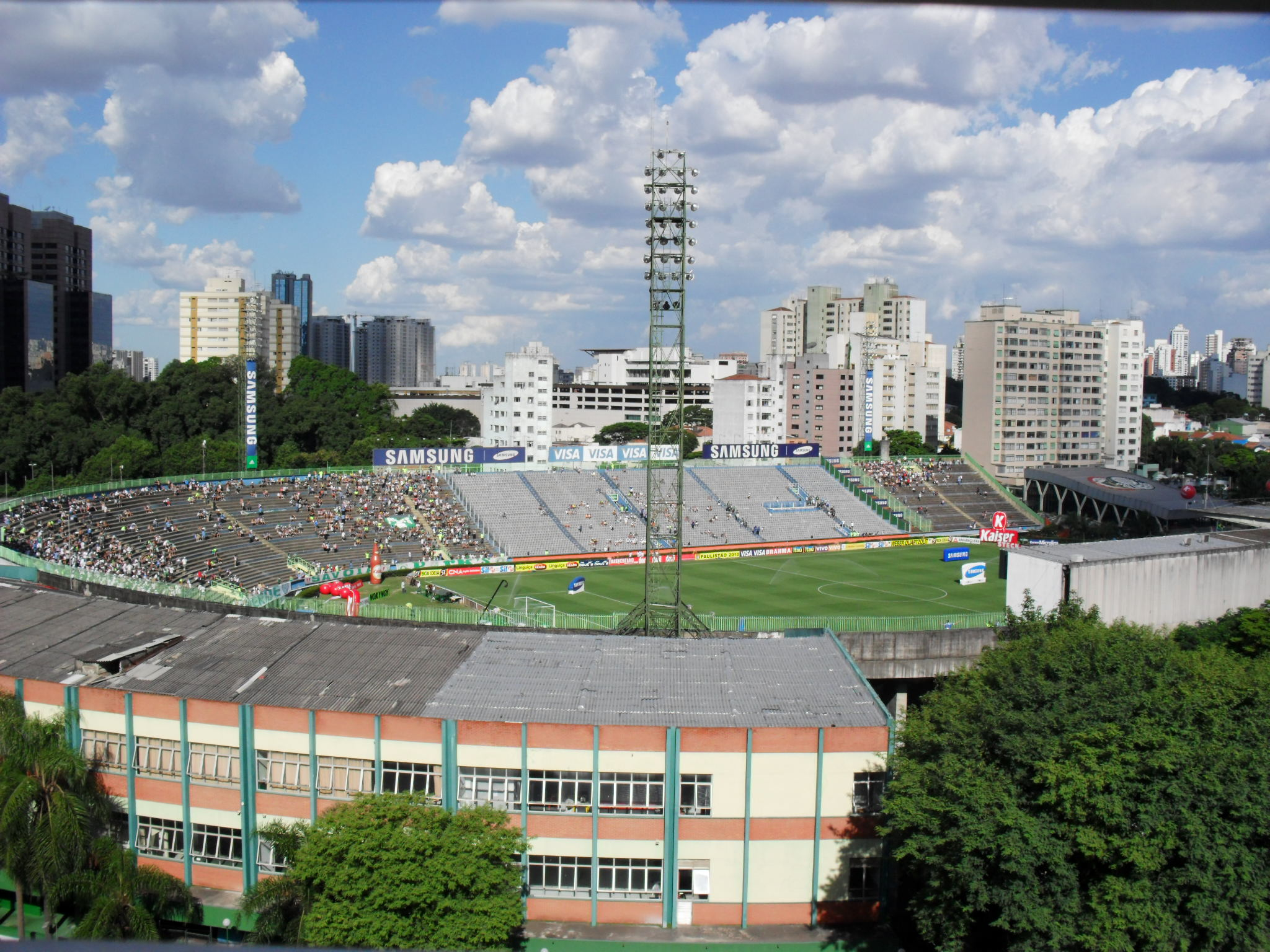
Palestra Italia stadium where the second leg of the final against Deportivo Cali was held

Under the command of Luiz Felipe Scolari, Alviverde had difficulty qualifying, only managing to qualify in the last round after beating Cerro Porteño in a comeback victory at Palestra Itália. Thus, they managed to gain 10 points, which were enough to advance to the stage in second place in their group. It was in one of the group stage games against Corinthians, in fact, that the then reserve Marcos took over the team's starting role after Velloso's injury, a position he would have until the end of the competition.

Palmeiras faced a challenging road to the finals, defeating the defending champions Vasco da Gama in the round of 16 by 5–3 on aggregate, rival Corinthians in the quarterfinals on penalties, and 1996 Copa Libertadores winners River Plate in the semi-finals by 3–1 on aggregate.

Palmeiras' base team, in addition to goalkeeper Marcos, who replaced the injured archer Velloso in the group stage of the competition, was made up of full-backs Arce (right) and Júnior (left); by defenders Júnior Baiano and Roque Júnior; midfielders César Sampaio and Rogério; midfielders Alex and Zinho; and by attackers Paulo Nunes and Oséas. Strikers, Evair and Euller also played an important role in the victory, as well as defender Cléber and midfielder Galeano.

The 1999 Libertadores final indicated that there would be an unprecedented champion, as neither Palmeiras nor Deportivo Cali had won the tournament until then. The Palestrina team was runner-up in 1961 and 1968, while the Colombian team was runner-up in 1978. This was the first, and to this day only, time that Palmeiras and Deportivo Cali faced each other in the Libertadores.

The final matches were against Colombian team Deportivo Cali, the 1978 Copa Libertadores runners up. In the first leg in Cali, Deportivo beat Palmeiras 1–0. In the second leg, at Estádio Palestra Itália, Palmeiras beat Deportivo 2–1 and won the competition in a penalty shootout.

In the quarter-finals of the tournament, Palmeiras eliminated arch-rivals compatriot Corinthians. Both matches were held at the Morumbi Stadium and ended with a score of 2–0: in the first, Palmeiras won; in the second, from Corinthians. As a result, the decision went to penalties, with the team in green and white winning 4–2. A similar elimination would happen again in 2000, also after a penalty shootout (5–4) between the arch-rivals, but already in semi-final phase of the continental competition, which took Palmeiras to the decision.

Betting on a more offensive scheme, Palmeiras went to Colombia for the first match and played a very close game. The Brazilian team had difficulty creating opportunities in the first half, as two of the team's main escape valves, full-backs Arce and Júnior, were not playing well. While Palmeiras tried to create danger in set pieces, resisting pressure, Deportivo opened the scoring, at 42, after a play by Candelo that Bonilla headed in, inside the small area, to open the scoring for the Colombian team.

Fourteen days later, the two teams returned to the field for the decisive match. Counting on a packed Palestra Itália and with the 32 thousand available tickets sold in eight hours, Palmeiras needed a two-goal victory to win the title, or at least win by one goal to take the dispute to penalties.

==== Penalties ====
Without being able to count on three of the best takers in the squad (Alex, Arce, and Evair), Palmeiras opened the charges, which were in the north goal of Palestra Itália, with midfielder Zinho, also one of the best takers. The midfielder took a strong shot, however, he exaggerated the height and kicked the ball against the crossbar, silencing the stadium. Soon after, goalkeeper Dudamel converted his shot, giving Deportivo Cali the lead. Palmeiras defenders Júnior Baiano and Roque Júnior also converted theirs, as did Gaviria and Yepes, who maintained the advantage for the Colombians. Midfielder Rogério left everything the same in a shot from the right corner. The crowd started chanting "fora!" or "out!" to distract Deportivo's next striker, full-back Bedoya, and apparently it worked: the strong shot hit Marcos' left post foot, lightly grazed the goalkeeper and headed towards the touchline. Palmeiras was back in contention. In the last Palmeiras penalty, Euller converted his kick by shooting into Dudamel's right corner, putting the Alviverde team in advantage for the first time and depending only on a mistake by Deportivo in the last Colombian penalty to be champion. Again the fans shouted "out!", and midfielder Zapata, who had converted his penalty in extra time by shooting into the left corner, decided to reverse the side and looked for the right corner, but wasted the penalty by shooting out, to the right of the goal, finishing the dispute 4x3 and sealing Alviverde's conquest of the Libertadores for the first time in its history.

This was the first Libertadores title for the São Paulo team, which had previously, in 1961 and 1968, finished runner-up in the competition.

With the victory, Palmeiras secured their second continental victory in history until then, after the 1998 Copa Mercosur. They also qualified for the 1999 Intercontinental Cup, in Tokyo, where they would face Manchester United. The title made Palmeiras the seventh Brazilian club to win the Libertadores, and the third consecutive Brazilian title in the competition, an unprecedented event until then.

==== Intercontinental Cup (1999) ====
Lineup of the 1999 Intercontinental Cup

After Palmeiras' triumph in the Libertadores final, the team would face the Champions League winner, Manchester United.

A Roy Keane goal, in the 35th minute, came after a great play by Ryan Giggs on the left side. The Welshman reached the baseline, crossed high, Marcos left the goal badly, jumped to deflect the ball but didn't reach it, and the Irish midfielder arrived to touch the ball with his right foot into the back of the net and score.

After the goal, Manchester United saw Palmeiras play, pressure and often try to score an equalizer. Alex, who had already missed a chance at the beginning of the game, was the name in focus. Palmeiras pressed a lot and had great chances with Oséas, Asprilla and Alex. The number 10 also had a goal disallowed in a move that has been contested to this day by Palmeiras fans.

Palmeiras had Alex as number 10, he was the team's great star. There were also important names such as Marcos, Arce, César Sampaio and Zinho, as well as Paulo Nunes and Asprilla – the later a reinforcement for the Intercontinental, who was not on the American champion team in the first half of the year. Led by Luiz Felipe Scolari, the team came into the contest strong. Palmeiras arrived strong, but they would have an opponent with prestige and strength on the other side.

Manchester United came to the competition with almost the entire team complete, with the exception of goalkeeper Peter Schmeichel, who left the club after winning the Champions League. The starter was Mark Bosnich and the Red Devils played with a full midfield, instead of the usual two attackers: Mark Bosnich; Gary Neville, Mikael Silvestre, Jaap Stam and Denis Irwin; Nicky Butt, Roy Keane, Paul Scholes, David Beckham and Ryan Giggs; Dwight Yorke, who was normally a starter, was on the bench. Andy Cole was out injured. The coach, as he was for 26 years from 1986, was Alex Ferguson.

=== Three international finals (1999–2000) ===
In May, Flamengo and Palmeiras had already faced each other in a knockout stage: In that year's Copa do Brasil, Palmeiras qualified, after losing the first match in Rio by 2 x 1, but winning the return match by 4 x 2. with 2 goals scored at the end of the game. After a semester in which they won the Campeonato Carioca that year, Flamengo was coming off a bad second half, failing in the Campeonato Brasileiro. News reports at the time reported that the fans even stoned the team bus and protested against the team, especially against Romário, who was also publicly fighting with the leaders. So much so that, on 14 November, one day after Flamengo's game against Inter in Rio Grande do Sul for the "Seletiva para a Libertadores", the newspapers reported the 'end of the Romário era'. Baixinho was appointed as the organizer of a night out in Caxias do Sul shortly after the match, days before, which culminated in Flamengo's disqualification for the second phase of that year's Campeonato Brasileiro. A few days later, the number 11 would sign with Vasco.

Palmeiras on the other hand, had a first semester where the team won the long-awaited Copa Libertadores, the results in the second semester were lacking, but winning the Copa Mercosur would represent a calmer end of the year for the team.

The first leg final was played on 16 December 1999, at the Maracaná Stadium where Flamengo would beat Palmeiras 4 to 3. The first leg final was played on 20 December 1999, at the Parque Antártica where both teams would tie 3 to 3, a result that allowed Flamengo to become champion, in addition to completing the Olympic round —because it had more points. Being the first Olympic round of the Mercosur Cup. It was the second time that two teams from the same country played in the Mercosur Cup final, which is why all the final matches were played in Brazil.

In June 2000, Palmeiras reached another Libertadores final. The first game at La Bombonera, Buenos Aires ended in a 2–2 draw, with two goals from Rodolfo Arruabarrena, for Boca Juniors, and Pena and Euller for Palmeiras. The return match also ended in a draw, only this time, without goals. The decision went to the penalty shootout, where Boca did better: taking advantage of four penalties, and with goalkeeper Óscar Córdoba defending the charges from Palmeiras players Asprilla and Roque Júnior.

Boca Juniors had gone twenty-two years without winning the continental title: their last cup had been in 1978. Palmeiras were trying to win their second title, having won their first title the previous year, over Deportivo Cali. Another point that is often remembered are the refereeing errors, especially in the second leg, in São Paulo. Palmeiras did not have two penalties awarded in their favor, and Boca had a legal goal disallowed for offside, irritating both teams. The two clubs would face each other again in the following edition, this time in the semi-final, in matches also marked by refereeing errors, where, again, Boca would prevail and win on penalties. With the title, the Buenos Aires team became three-time champions of the competition, and won the right to compete in the 2000 Intercontinental Cup, against Real Madrid, winner of the 1999-00 UEFA Champions League.

In December of that same year, Palmeiras reached the final of the Mercosur again. Against another Rio de Janeiro team, Vasco da Gama. The first leg was played on 6 December 2000, at the Estadio São Januário, where Vasco da Gama won 2–0 against Palmeiras. The final of the race was played on 12 December 2000 at Parque Antártica, where Palmeiras won 1–0 against Vasco da Gama. Because both teams won their respective parties, they were equal in points, which is why they had to play a third party to define the champion. The third party in the final was played on 20 December 2000, at Parque Antártica, where Vasco da Gama won 4–3 against Palmeiras – a chance to lose 3 to 0 —, a result that allowed Vasco da Gama to win becoming champion of the Mercosur Cup.

=== "Abel" era (2020s) ===
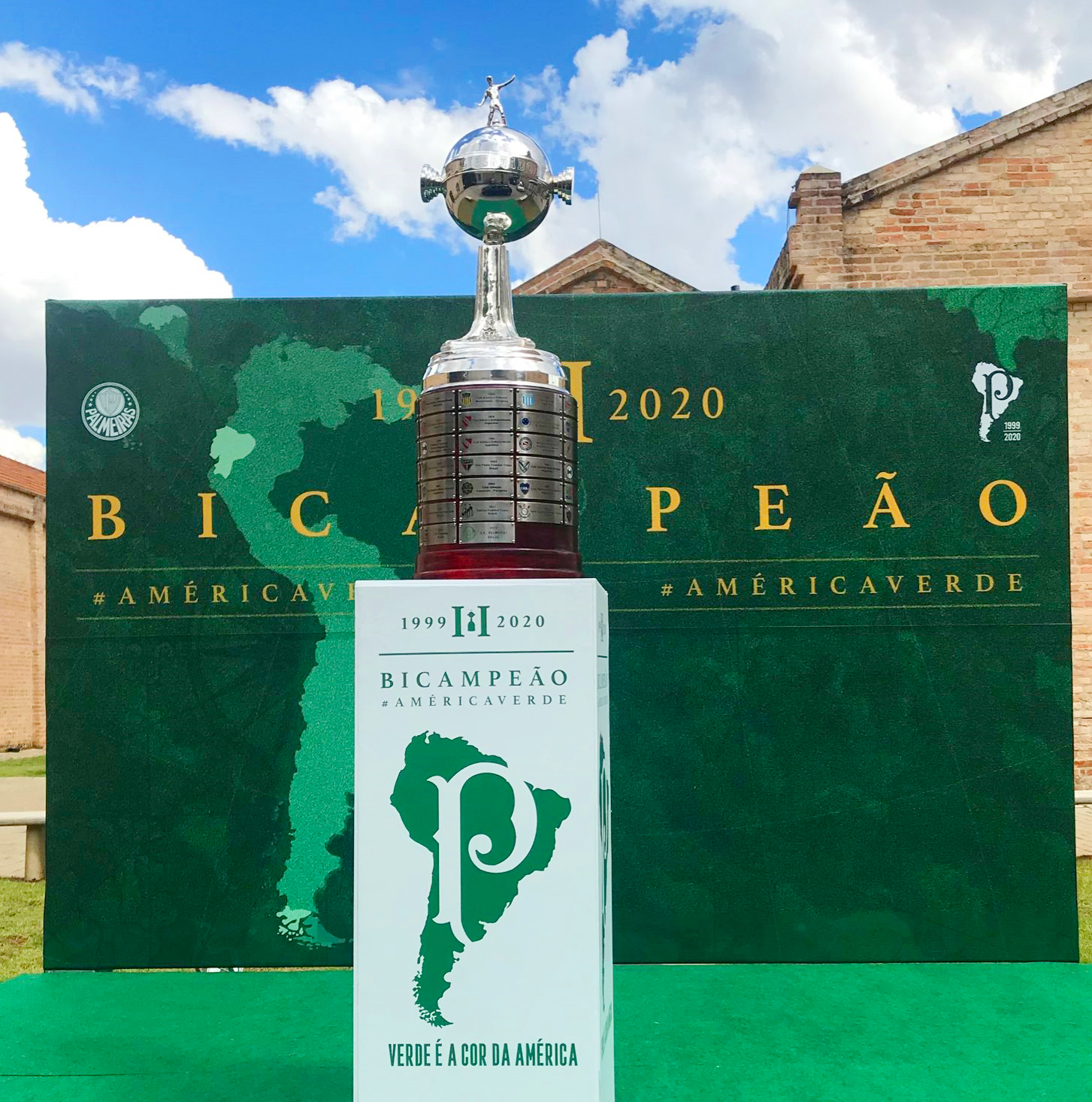
Palmeiras' 2nd Libertadores trophy which the club won in 2020 against rival Santos

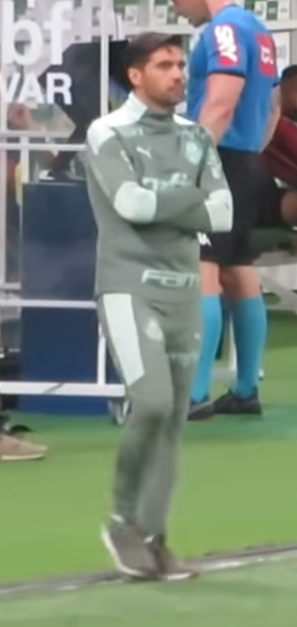
Abel Ferreira, Palmeiras' coach in November 2021

Qualified directly for the group stage of the 2020 Libertadores after coming third in the 2019 Campeonato Brasileiro, Palmeiras was drawn into group B, along with Bolívar, from Bolivia, Tigre, from Argentina, and an opponent that would be determined in the preliminary stages. This opponent ended up becoming Guaraní, who beat Corinthians, then Palestino and qualified for the group stage.

Still under the command of Vanderlei Luxemburgo, Palmeiras secured the best campaign in the group stage by reaching 16 points, winning five matches and drawing one. This meant that Palmeiras would have control of the field for the second leg of all the knockout stages before the final.

In the knockout stage of the competition, Palmeiras faced Delfín in the round of 16. In the first match, they beat the Ecuadorian club 3–1, and in the return match, at Allianz Parque, they thrashed 5–0, guaranteeing their place in the quarterfinals.

In the quarterfinals, under the command of new coach Abel Ferreira, Alviverde faced the Paraguayan club Libertad, who beat the Bolivian club Jorge Wilstermann in the round of 16. In the first match, the two teams drew 1–1 in Paraguay, and Alviverde won 3–0 at Allianz Parque to guarantee their presence in another semi-final of the competition.

After winning River Plate in a dreadful semi-final Palmeiras qualified for the final of the Libertadores against rival, Santos. This being the fifth Libertadores decision for both. Palmeiras won the title in 1999, and came second in 1961, 1968 and 2000, while Santos won the title in 1962, 1963 and 2011, being second in 2003.

Furthermore, this was the fourth decision between two teams from the same country in the Libertadores, being the third dispute between Brazilians. In 2005, the final was played by São Paulo and Athletico Paranaense, with the tricolor team becoming champions. In 2006, São Paulo was again a finalist, this time against Internacional; The Colorado team achieved its first title in the competition. The other decision between teams from the same country was in Argentina, in 2018, in which River Plate won their fourth title against Boca Juniors.

Considering all the finals between the two teams, Palmeiras had an advantage: they beat Alvinegro in the finals of the 1959 Campeonato Paulista and the 2015 Copa do Brasil, while Santos won the 2015 Campeonato Paulista over Alviverde. Interestingly, before the match, the last five disputes in knockout tournaments between the two teams were resolved on penalties, with three Santos victories and two Palestrina victories.

This was the first time that the two best teams in the group stage reached the final. Counting the group stage and the knockout stages, Palmeiras had 29 points, and Santos, 27.

On the coaching side, Portuguese coach Abel Ferreira was looking for his first title as a professional coach, while Cuca was looking for his second Libertadores title, after having won the tournament with Atlético Mineiro in 2013.

In total the 2020 season, amid the COVID-19 pandemic, brought Palmeiras their second title in the Copa Libertadores da América, with a team led by Portuguese coach Abel Ferreira and with decisive players, such as Weverton, Gustavo Gómez, Viña, Raphael Veiga, Rony and Luiz Adriano, as well as revelations from the base, such as players Gabriel Menino, Danilo and Patrick de Paula. After the 2020 competition was delayed due to the disease that hit the planet, the semi-final stage and final were played in January of the following year. The team eliminated the favorite River Plate in the semi-finals and, in the single-game decision, played at the Maracanã Stadium, they defeated Santos, becoming champions with the best campaign in the competition. Palmeiras' second Libertadores title came 21 years after the 1999 victory. In addition to winning the Libertadores, the season marked the Alviverde triplice coroa, as the Campeonato Paulista and Copa do Brasil titles were also won, when the club arrived to the fourth championship.

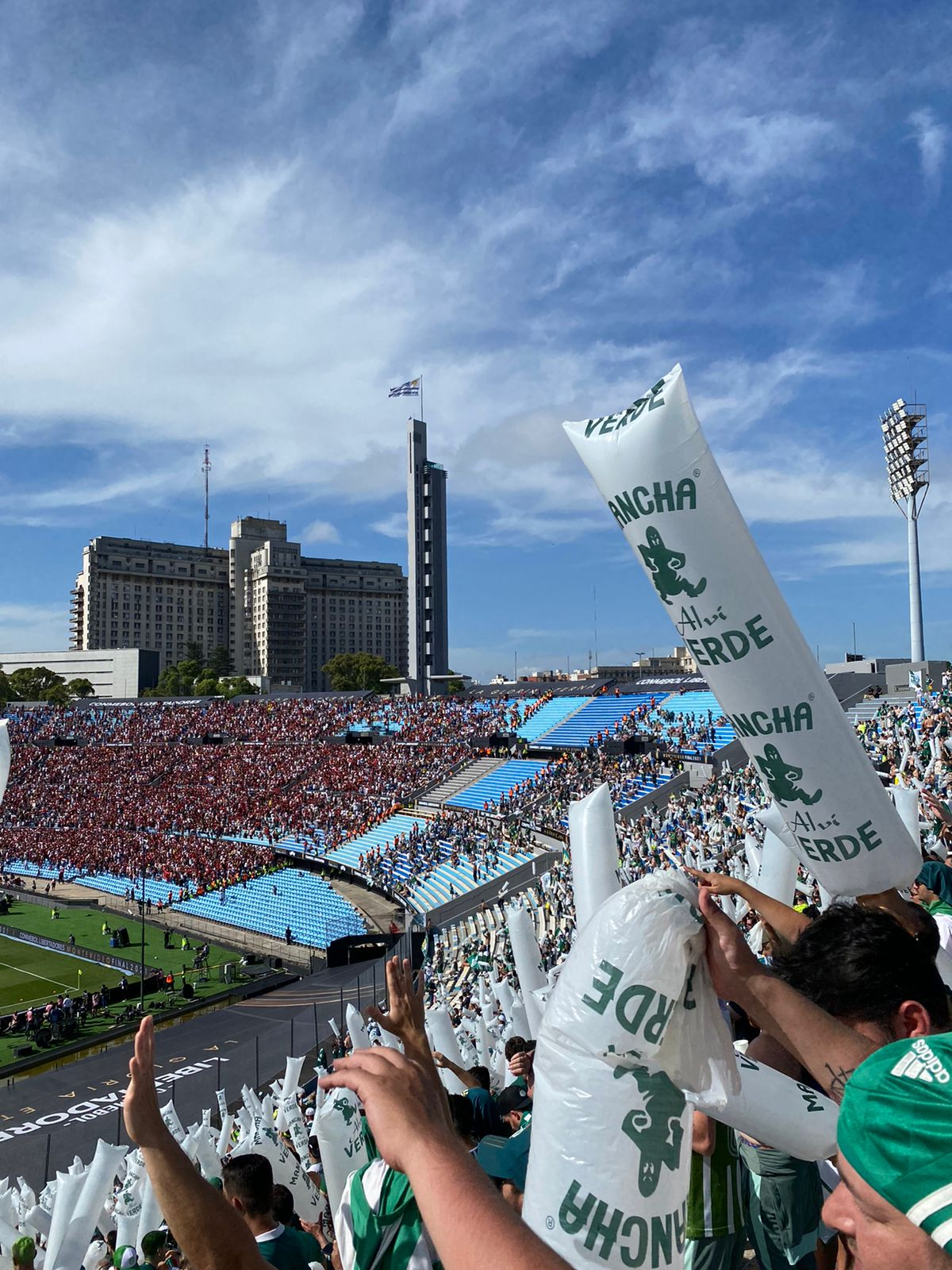
Palmeiras fans in the final of the 2021 Copa Libertadores

Palmeiras then disputed the 2021 Recopa Sudamericana against Defensa y Justicia. The Argentine club's title came after two decisive games that ended in a 2–1 draw. The first of them, held in Argentina, featured a Brazilian victory. The second, held in Brazil, featured an Argentine victory, in a game that included extra time. With a 3–3 aggregate score, Defensa y Justicia's victory came in a penalty shootout, 4–3. It was the first time that the Copa Sudamericana champion won the tournament since 2015.

Still in 2021, with the return of striker Dudu to the team and with full-back Piquerez and midfielder Gustavo Scarpa added to the winning base of the 2020 edition.

As they were the defending champions at the start of the tournament, Palmeiras qualified directly for the group stage of the Libertadores. It was drawn in group A, with Defensa y Justicia, from Argentina, Universitario, from Peru, and an opponent that would be defined after the preliminary stages. That opponent turned out to be Independiente del Valle, from Ecuador. Playing in the group stage, they qualified as leader, with fifteen points, obtaining five wins and one defeat. They had the second best campaign in the group stage, behind only Atlético Mineiro, who had sixteen points.

In the round of 16, in a draw, it was decided that Palmeiras would face Universidad Católica, from Chile, vice-leader of group F. Two 1–0 victories guaranteed Alviverde's presence in the quarter-finals, where they would face São Paulo. Choque-Rei had already happened several times in the history of the Libertadores, and the tricolor had never lost to the alviverde until then; in the elimination matches, he eliminated his rival three times. In the first game, at Morumbi, there was a 1–1 draw. On the way back, at Allianz Parque, Palmeiras won 3–0 and qualified for the semi-finals of the tournament, where they would face Atlético Mineiro, who had eliminated River Plate on the other side of the bracket. Because the Minas Gerais club had the best campaign during the tournament, the first game was in São Paulo; a 0–0 draw. At the Mineirão, Alviverde managed a 1–1 draw, and, due to the away goals rule, won the right to compete in another Libertadores final in its history, the second in a row.

In the decision, Palmeiras won the match 2–1 in extra time, after normal time ended in a 1–1 draw. Palmeiras opened the scoring with Raphael Veiga at the beginning of the game; Flamengo equalized with Gabriel Barbosa in the 27th minute of the second half. At the beginning of extra time, a mistake by Flamengo midfielder Andreas Pereira in the defense field allowed Palmeiras center forward Deyverson to steal the ball and score the tiebreaker, a result that Palmeiras maintained until the end of the match. It was the São Paulo club's third Libertadores win, after having won in 1999 and 2020; he joined Santos, São Paulo and Grêmio as Brazil's greatest Libertadores champions. Furthermore, the "Palestrino" club became two consecutive champions, something that had not happened since the 2001 edition, when Boca Juniors did so. With the victory, Palmeiras guaranteed a place in three tournaments: the 2021 FIFA Club World Cup, the 2022 Recopa Sudamericana, and the 2022 Copa Libertadores da América, which the team had also disputed the season before.

After the victory, some Palmeiras players celebrated by letting off steam, targeting Flamengo midfielder Willian Arão, who had mentioned days before that Flamengo would be champions by winning 2–0. Coach Abel Ferreira became Alviverde's most successful coach in the 21st century. On Flamengo's side, the players and fans supported Andreas for the mistake he made, with coach Renato Gaúcho blaming the deputy on himself; Renato ended up being fired by Flamengo two days after the final. The press considered that the red and black season was "frustrating" due to expectations created, even though they had won the Campeonato Carioca and the Supercopa do Brasil in the season.

Palmeiras managed to win the 2021 Copa Libertadores da América, becoming three-time champions of the competition by defeating Flamengo in the final held in Montevideo, Uruguay. With the title, the São Paulo team became the best-performing Brazilian club in the history of the Libertadores, with a series of records ahead of compatriot clubs and the only team in history to have won the Copa Libertadores twice in the same year.

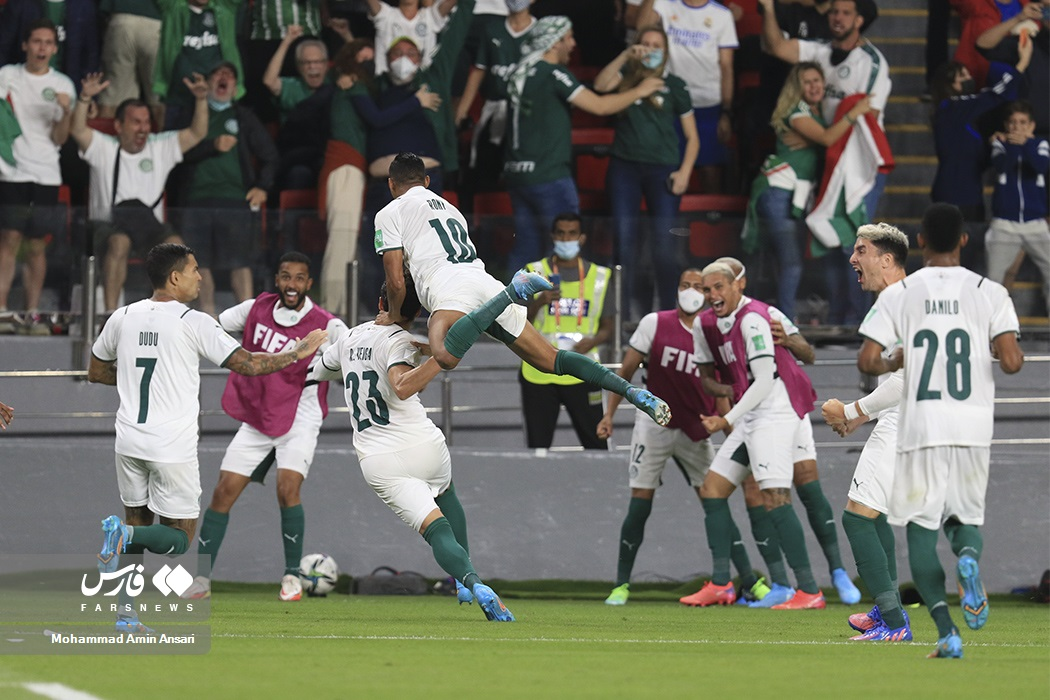
Raphael Veiga after scoring in the 2021 FIFA Club World Cup final

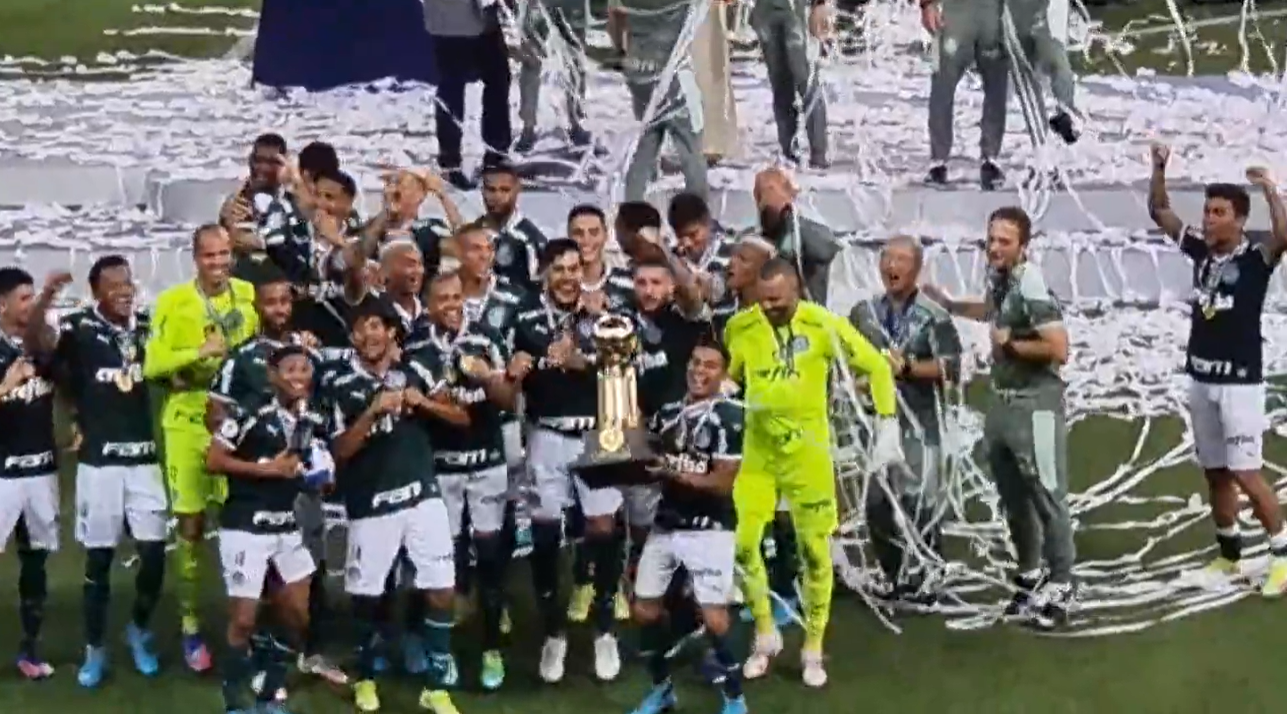
Palmeiras' 2022 team celebrating the Recopa Sudamericana conquest

The following year, less than a month after losing the 2021 FIFA Club World Cup final to Chelsea and finishing runners-up in the world championship, Palmeiras won the unprecedented title of the 2022 Recopa Sudamericana, by defeating Athletico Paranaense, champion of the 2021 Copa Sudamericana, in a very final played at Allianz Parque, in the first international decision in the Big Green arena. Still in 2022, the "Alviverde" won the Brazilian Championship title for the 11th time.

In the first decisive game for the 2022 Recopa Sudamericana, played in Curitiba, Athletico Paranaense opened the scoring in the 19th minute of the first half, with a goal scored by Uruguayan attacking midfielder David Terans. Still in the first half, Palmeiras reached a draw with a goal scored by midfielder Jaílson. In the second half, the red and black team reached the second goal with midfielder Marlos, but the alviverde drew 2–2 in extra time with a penalty goal taken by Raphael Veiga, leaving the title dispute open for the final in São Paulo.

In the second game, played in São Paulo, Palmeiras dominated the match from start to finish and won 2–0, with a free kick scored by midfielder Zé Rafael and a title-winning goal scored by midfielder Danilo. In the very first international final at Allianz Parque, the Alviverde team achieved yet another unprecedented title in its history, the fourth under the command of coach Abel Ferreira.

== International rivalries ==
=== Boca Juniors ===
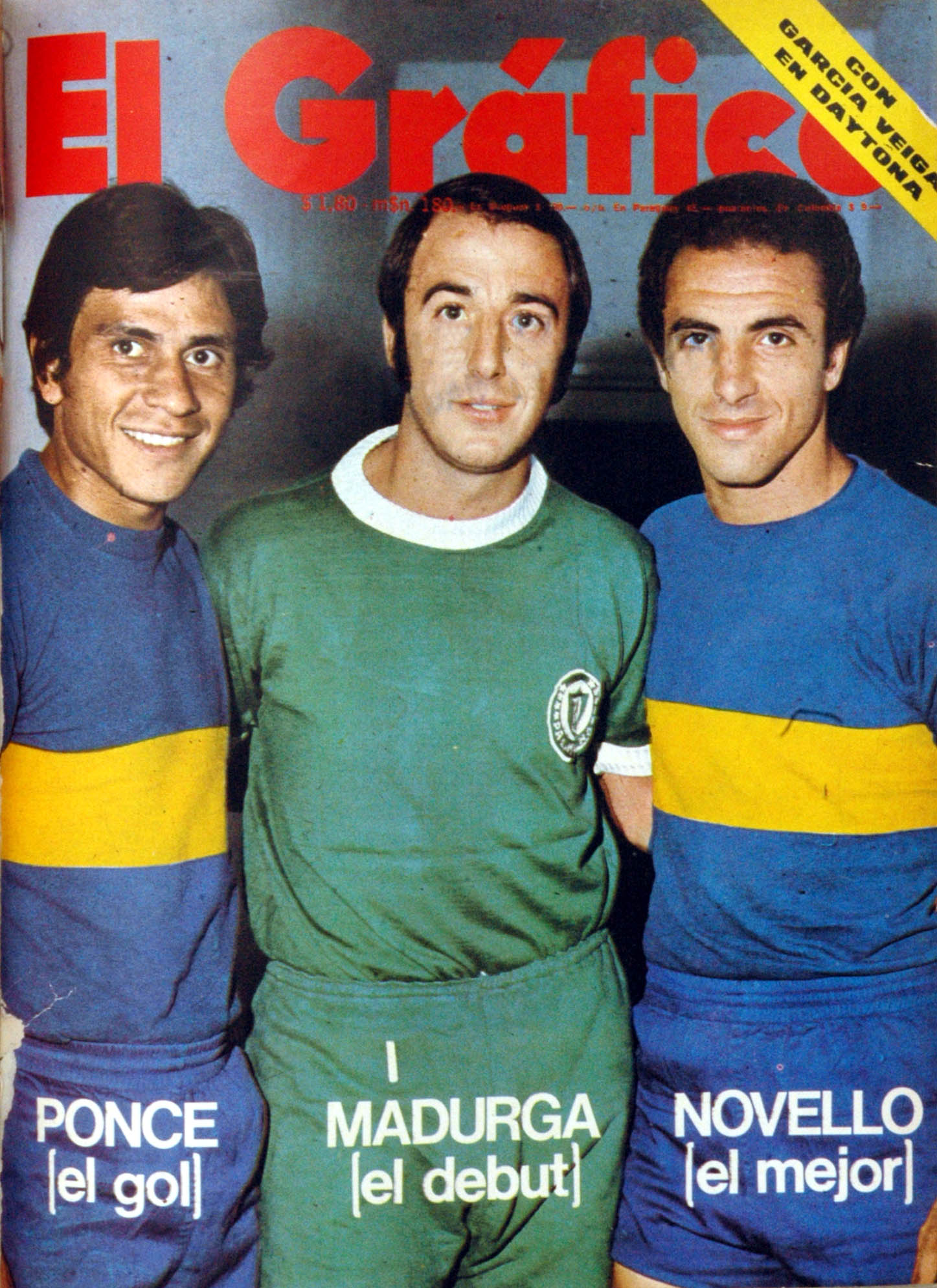
Ramón Ponce (Boca Juniors), Norberto Madurga (Palmeiras), and Nicolás Novello (Boca Juniors) on El Gráfico

Palmeiras and Boca Juniors are two clubs competing in one of the biggest classics in South American football. Due to the recent history, this classic can be considered the greatest rivalry between a Brazilian club and an Argentine club.

The rivalry is considered one of the major football rivalries in South America and has decided editions of the Copa Libertadores, as well as matches in earlier knockout stages of both the Libertadores itself and in the Copa Mercosur.

The two clubs decided the 2000 Copa Libertadores, won by Boca Juniors, after two draws, 2–2, in Buenos Aires, and 0–0, in São Paulo, and the Argentine team's victory on penalties. A year later, the same Boca eliminated Palmeiras in the semi-finals of the 2001 Copa Libertadores, after two 2–2 draws, in Buenos Aires and São Paulo, with victory again on penalties. The 2001 clash, especially the first leg in the Argentine capital, is remembered to this day by Alviverde fans due to serious refereeing errors by Paraguayan judge Ubaldo Aquino in favor of the Argentines.

Years earlier, Palmeiras scored the biggest defeat in history suffered by Boca in international competitions, 6–1 in the 1994 Copa Libertadores, which is also the Argentine club's biggest defeat in continental competition. On that occasion, the team led by coach Vanderlei Luxemburgo put on a gala performance against the team coached by César Luis Menotti, playing one of their greatest matches in history. In 2018, with a 2–0 victory, obtained in La Bombonera, in Buenos Aires, Argentina, in the group stage of the 2018 Copa Libertadores da América, Palmeiras established several important marks in the competition involving the Buenos Aires team in La Bombonera. It was the fifth Brazilian team to have defeated the Argentine team at the legendary stadium, achieved the biggest victory for a Brazilian team over Boca in the competition and imposed on Boca the biggest defeat for a foreign team in the entire history of the Libertadores at the rival's stadium.

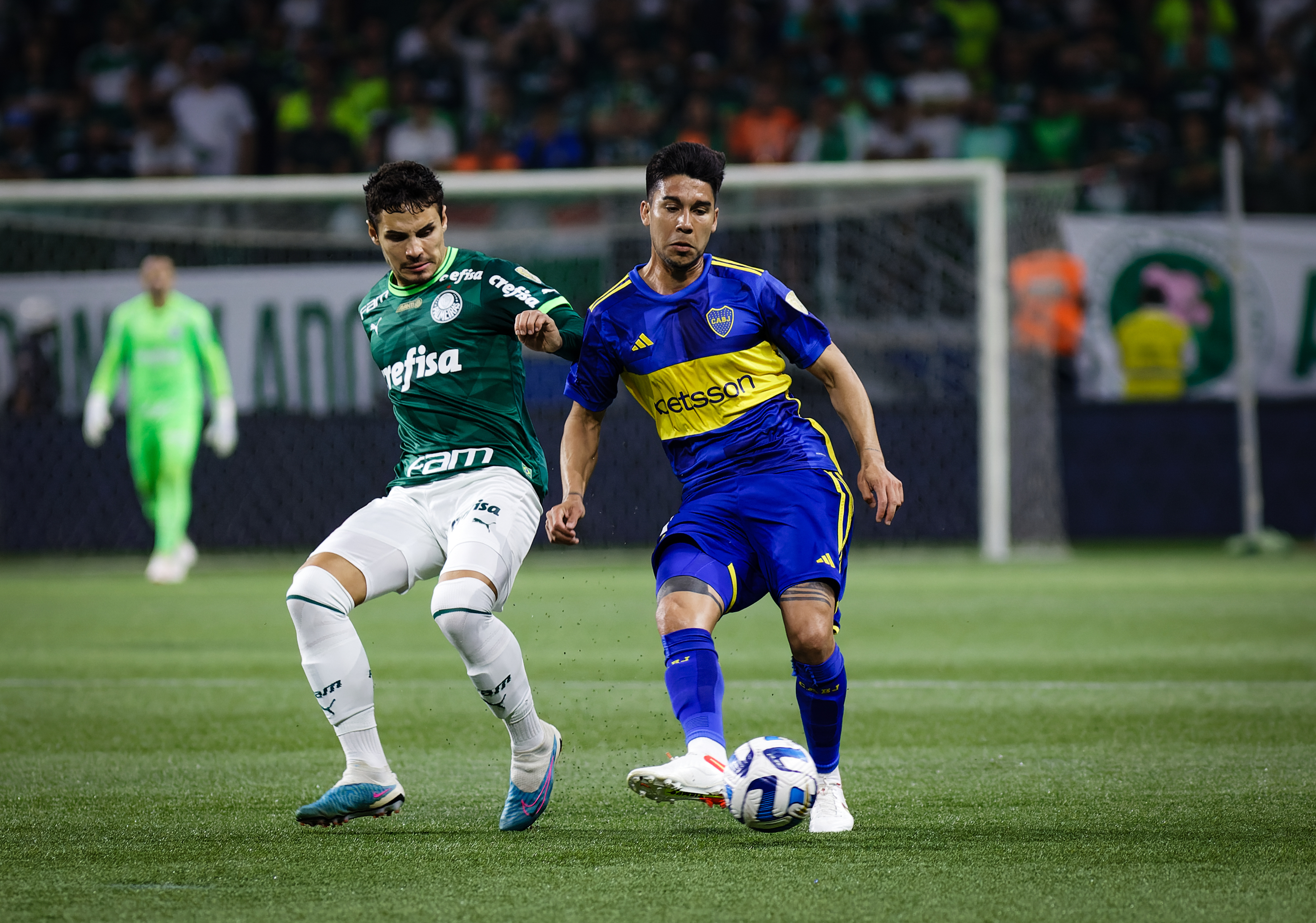
Palmeiras 0x0 Boca Juniors during the semi-final of the Copa Libertadores 2023

In the same year that imposed another historic defeat on Boca, Palmeiras was once again eliminated by the Argentine team in the knockout stage of a Libertadores and, again, in a semi-final. In the first game, in Buenos Aires, the Buenos Aires club beat the São Paulo club with two goals scored by striker Dario Benedetto in the final stage. In the return game, the match at Allianz Parque featured high doses of emotion, as the Brazilian club came from behind on the scoreboard in the first half, turned around in the second half and came close to scoring the two goals difference in the balance to qualify, but was eliminated with the goal scored again by Benedetto. In 2023, Palmeiras faced Boca Juniors again in the Libertadores. The two games (round trip) ended in draws, the first goalless, and the second 1–1, having been won, on penalties, by Boca by the score of 4–2.

In total, Palmeiras and Boca Juniors have already faced each other twenty-seven times. Of the ten matches, the white-green giant won eight, the Argentines won four and fifteen games ended in a draw. In total, Palmeiras scored forty goals and Boca scored thirty-one goals.

=== Main confrontations ===
==== Finals of the Copa Libertadores of 2000 ====
The first game of the finals was held in Buenos Aires, Argentina, at the Alberto J. Armando Stadium (La Bombonera), where the teams drew 2–2. The second game was played at the Cícero Pompeu de Toledo Stadium (Morumbi), where there was a 0–0 draw. With both games equal, the championship was decided on penalties, with Boca winning 4–2. Before beating Palmeiras in the final, Boca qualified first in Group 2 of the competition, which also included teams from Peñarol, from Uruguay; Blooming, from Bolivia; and Universidad Católica de Chile. In the round of 16, they eliminated El Nacional, from Ecuador. In the quarter-finals, they beat Argentine arch-rivals River Plate. In the semi-finals, they eliminated América from Mexico. Boca's highlights in winning the championship were coach Carlos Bianchi, who had already won the 1994 Libertadores with Vélez Sarsfield, also from Argentina, and midfielder Riquelme. In the very final, Colombian goalkeeper Córdoba also stood out, who saved two Palmeiras penalties in the decisive kicks and who was elected the best player of the match.

==== Semi-finals of the Copa Libertadores of 2001 ====
A year later, Palmeiras and Boca Juniors dueled once again in the Copa Libertadores. But, this time, the dispute was valid for the semi-finals of the final, in the 2001 Copa Libertadores. The first game took place at La Bombonera and the two teams tied the match 2–2, with goals from Alex and Fabio Junior from Palmeiras and goals from Barros Schelotto and Barijho. In the return game, at the Palestra Italia Stadium, Boca Juniors opened the scoring with Gaitán and expanded with Riquelme. But, in the 36th minute of the first half, Palmeiras player Fabio Junior scored the goal that Alviverde needed. Then, in the 21st minute of the second half, Boca Juniors player Bermúdez scored an own goal that tied the match on aggregate. The own goal made the match go to penalties where the Argentine team reached the final, winning 2–3 on penalties.

==== Group stage and semi-finals of the Copa Libertadores of 2018 ====
After nearly two decades of no international interaction, Palmeiras and Boca Juniors faced each other in the group stage of the 2018 Copa Libertadores. In the two classics that both clubs had in the group stage, there was one tie and one victory for Palmeiras which occurred in La Bombonera.

Palmeiras and Boca Juniors once again fought for the final stages of the Copa Libertadores, the classic occurred this time in the 2018 Copa Libertadores. In the first match Boca Juniors won Palmeiras, 2–0 in La Bombonera with two late goals by Darío Benedetto. In the second leg, both teams tied 2–2 with Abila and Benedetto scoring for Boca Juniors and Luan and Gustavo Gomez scoring for Palmeiras, therefore Boca Juniors on aggregate eliminated Palmeiras once again and eliminating Palmeiras 4–2.

==== Semi-finals of the Copa Libertadores of 2023 ====
The 2023 Copa Libertadores semi-final matches between Palmeiras and Boca Juniors was a set of very contested classics. The first leg in Buenos Aires ended in a scoreless 0–0 draw between the two. With both teams showcasing a great classic. The second leg at Allianz Parque in Brazil saw a more open and fast game with Edinson Cavani opening the score for Boca Juniors at the 23rd minute of the first half. Furtherly in the second-half, Joaquin Piquerez tied the game for Palmeiras at the 73rd minute. Which led the game to a penalty-shootout where Boca Juniors once again eliminated Palmeiras on penalties.

=== Cerro Porteño ===
A match between Palmeiras and Cerro Porteño during the 2022 Copa Libertadores.

Palmeiras and Cerro Porteño constitute together what can be perceived as the greatest rivalry between a Brazilian and a Paraguayan football team, a rivalry which has seen a rise in the last few years. It is the most repeated international confrontation in the Copa Libertadores' history.

The two teams have played twenty-one matches against each other in the Copa Libertadores. Both teams have faced each other four times in the knockout stages of the tournament in the years of 2001, 2018, 2022, and most recently: 2026, in all four confrontations, Palmeiras managed to eliminate the Paraguayan team.

The confrontations have also been marked by controversial occurrences, especially occurrences of racism. The Brazilian team has reported racist episodes during matches against Cerro. The Paraguayan team has also reported a racist episode coming from the Brazilian side's supporters. Notoriously, a major episode of racism in a U-20 confrontation between both teams that caused national and international outcry is that of Luighi, then one of Palmeiras' U-20 players, speaking out against the racist comments he received while played in Paraguay against Cerro's U-20 team.

== Honours ==
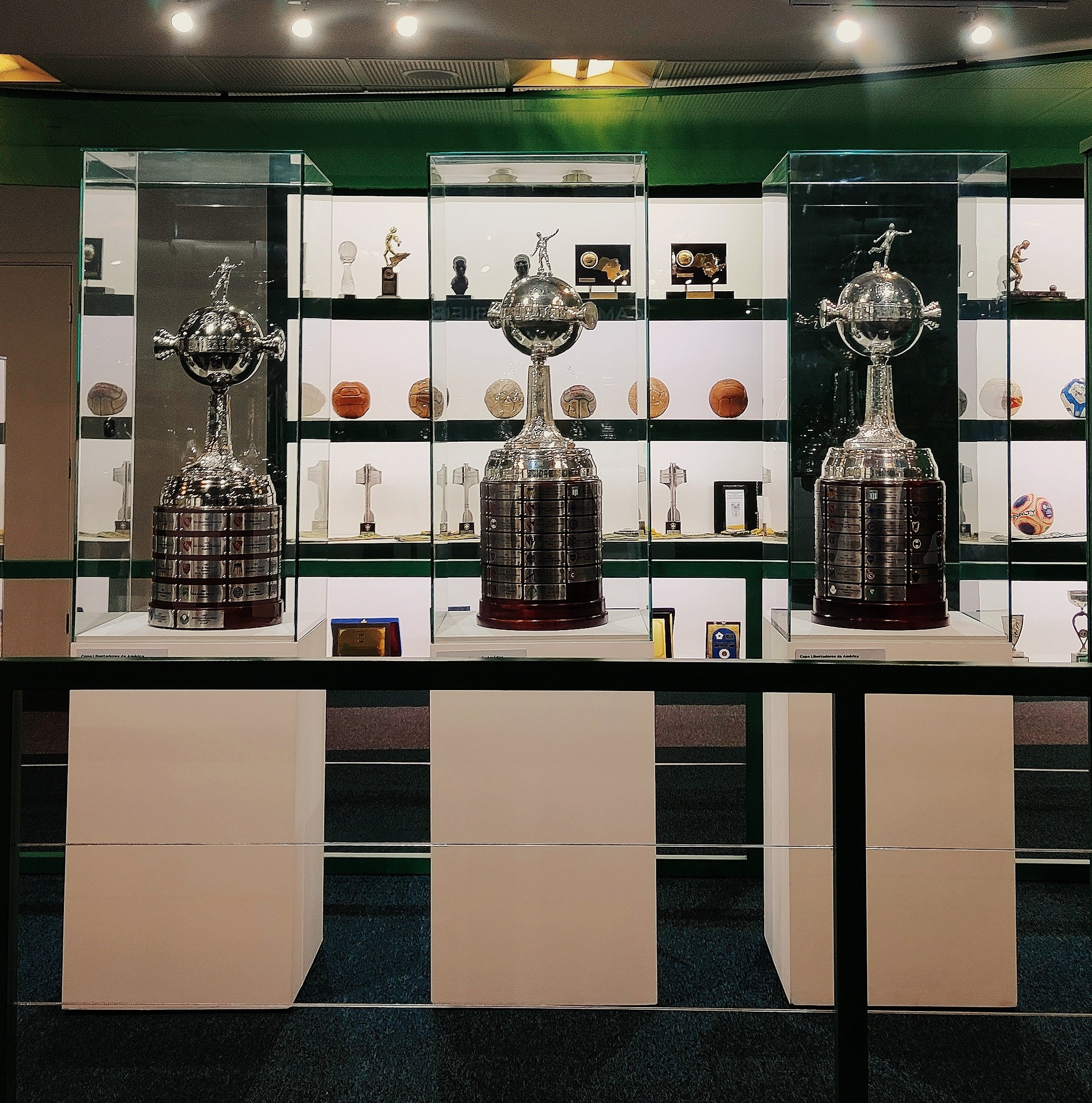
Palmeiras' 3 Copa Libertadores trophies

Palmeiras' honours in international club competitions

Competition	Titles	Years
Copa Rio	1	1951
Copa Libertadores	3	1999, 2020, 2021
Recopa Sudamericana	1	2022
Copa Mercosur	1	1998

== International performance ==
=== Competitional positions ===
As of 2026

==== Copa Libertadores positions – 1960-present ====
Year	Position	Year	Position	Year	Position	Year	Position	Year	Position	Year	Position	Year	Position
1960	–	1970	–	1980	–	1990	–	2000	2nd	2010	–	2020	1st
1961	2nd	1971	3rd	1981	–	1991	–	2001	3rd	2011	–	2021	1st
1962	–	1972	–	1982	–	1992	–	2002	–	2012	–	2022	3rd
1963	–	1973	7th	1983	–	1993	–	2003	–	2013	15th	2023	3rd
1964	–	1974	11th	1984	–	1994	13th	2004	–	2014	–	2024	10th
1965	–	1975	–	1985	–	1995	5th	2005	10th	2015	–	2025	2nd
1966	–	1976	–	1986	–	1996	–	2006	13th	2016	18th	2026	
1967	–	1977	–	1987	–	1997	–	2007	–	2017	9th		
1968	2nd	1978	–	1988	–	1998	–	2008	–	2018	4th		
1969	–	1979	12th	1989	–	1999	1st	2009	7th	2019	5th		

==== Copa Mercosur/Copa Sudamericana positions – 1998-present ====
Year	Position	Year	Position	Year	Position
1998	1st	2008	8th	2018	–
1999	2nd	2009	–	2019	–
2000	2nd	2010	3rd	2020	–
2001	15th	2011	19th	2021	–
2002	–	2012	14th	2022	–
2003	16th	2013	–	2023	–
2004	–	2014	–	2024	–
2005	–	2015	–	2025	–
2006	–	2016	–		
2007	–	2017	–		

==== Recopa Sudamericana positions – 1989-present ====
Year	Position	Year	Position	Year	Position	Year	Position
1989	–	2003	–	2013	–	2023	–
1990	–	2004	–	2014	–	2024	–
1991	–	2005	–	2015	–	2025	–
1992	–	2006	–	2016	–		
1993	–	2007	–	2017	–		
1994	–	2008	–	2018	–		
1995	–	2009	–	2019	–		
1996	–	2010	–	2020	–		
1997	–	2011	–	2021	2nd		
1998	–	2012	–	2022	1st		

==== Copa Rio/Intercontinental Cup/FIFA Club World Cup positions – 1951-present ====
Year	Position	Year	Position	Year	Position	Year	Position	Year	Position	Year	Position	Year	Position
1951	1st	1968	–	1980	–	1990	–	2000	–	2010	–	2020	4th
1951	1st	1969	–	1981	–	1991	–	2001	–	2011	–	2021	2nd
1960	–	1970	–	1982	–	1992	–	2002	–	2012	–	2022	–
1961	–	1971	–	1983	–	1993	–	2003	–	2013	–	2023	–
1962	–	1972	–	1984	–	1994	–	2004	–	2014	–	2024	–
1963	–	1973	–	1985	–	1995	–	2005	–	2015	–	2025	8th
1964	–	1974	–	1986	–	1996	–	2006	–	2016	–		
1965	–	1976	–	1987	–	1997	–	2007	–	2017	–		
1966	–	1977	–	1988	–	1998	–	2008	–	2018	–		
1967	–	1979	–	1989	–	1999	2nd	2009	–	2019	–		

=== Competitional statistics ===
==== Copa Libertadores ====
Titles	Games	W	D	L	GF	GA	GD	Pts
3	267	152	53	61	515	262	+253	509

==== Copa Mercosur/Copa Sudamericana ====
Titles	Games	W	D	L	GF	GA	GD	Pts
1	66	35	11	20	123	82	+41	116

==== Recopa Sudamericana ====
Titles	Games	W	D	L	GF	GA	GD	Pts
1	4	2	1	1	7	5	+2	7

==== Club world competitions (Copa Rio/Intercontinental Cup/FIFA Club World Cup) ====
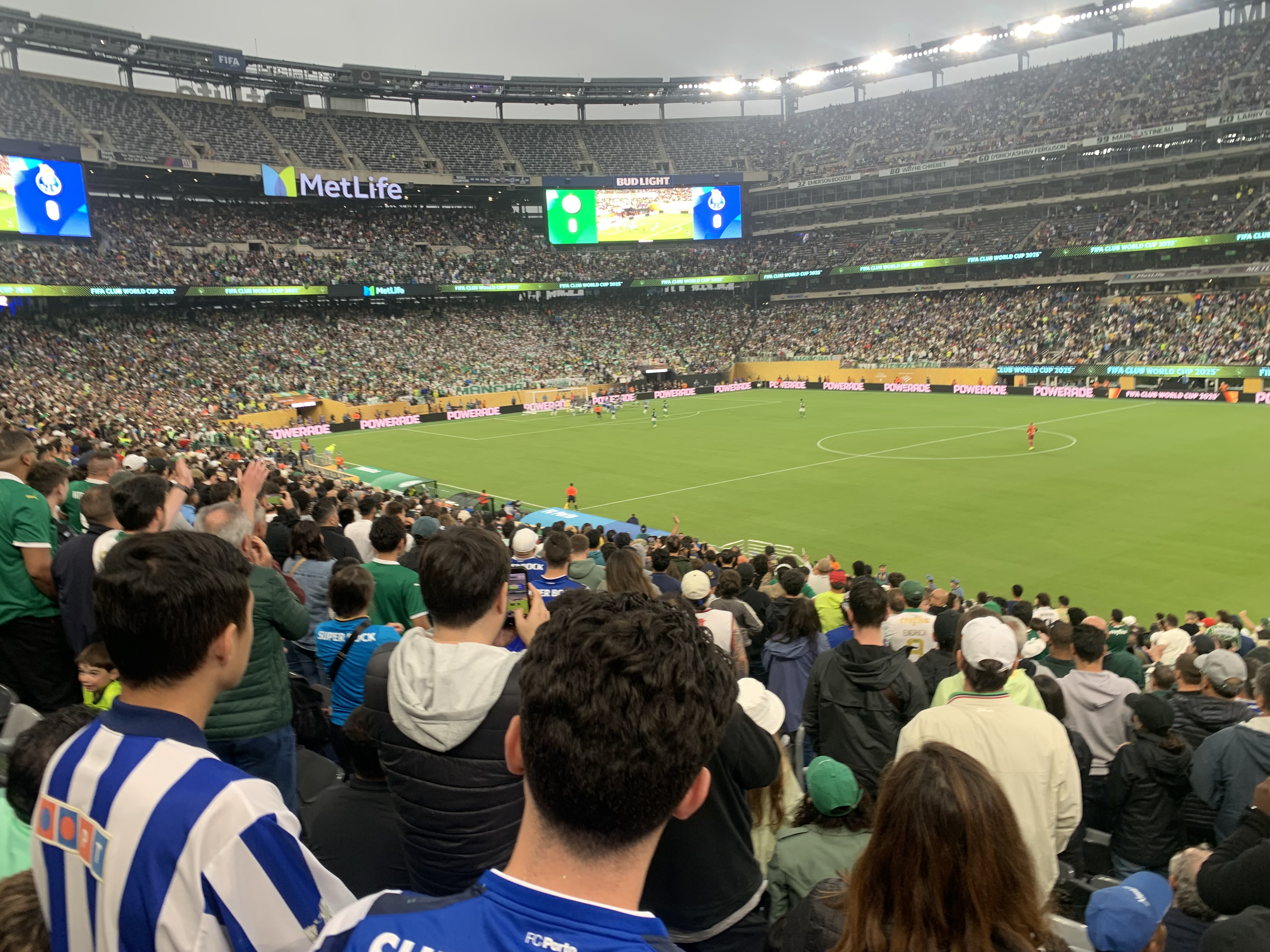
Palmeiras playing Porto at MetLife Stadium during the 2025 FIFA Club World Cup.

Titles	Games	W	D	L	GF	GA	GD	Pts
1	21	9	7	5	24	18	+6	34

== Further statistics ==
=== Brazilian teams by titles in club world competitions ===
Brazilian teams by titles in club world competitions
Team	Titles	Years
(Brazil) Palmeiras	1	1951
(Brazil) Santos	2	1962, 1963
(Brazil) Flamengo	1	1981
(Brazil) Grêmio	1	1983
(Brazil) São Paulo	3	1992, 1993, 2005
(Brazil) Internacional	1	2006
(Brazil) Corinthians	2	2000, 2012

=== Brazilian teams by victories in club world competitions ===
Brazilian teams by victories in club world competitions
Team	Victories
(São Paulo (state)) Palmeiras	7
(Rio de Janeiro (state)) Flamengo	7
(Rio de Janeiro (state)) Vasco da Gama	6
(São Paulo (state)) Santos	5
(Rio de Janeiro (state)) Fluminense	4
(São Paulo (state)) São Paulo	4
(São Paulo (state)) Corinthians	4
(Rio Grande do Sul) Internacional	3
(Rio Grande do Sul) Grêmio	2
(Rio de Janeiro (state)) Botafogo	2
(Minas Gerais) Atlético Mineiro	1
(Minas Gerais) Cruzeiro	0

=== Brazilian teams by goals in club world competitions ===
Brazilian teams by goals in club world competitions
Team	Goals
(Rio de Janeiro (state)) Vasco da Gama	21
(São Paulo (state)) Palmeiras	19
(São Paulo (state)) Santos	18
(Rio de Janeiro (state)) Flamengo	17
(Rio de Janeiro (state)) Fluminense	10
(São Paulo (state)) São Paulo	9
(São Paulo (state)) Corinthians	8
(Rio Grande do Sul) Internacional	7
(Minas Gerais) Atlético Mineiro	4
(Rio Grande do Sul) Grêmio	3
(Rio de Janeiro (state)) Botafogo	3
(Minas Gerais) Cruzeiro	0

=== Brazilian teams by defeats in club world competitions ===
Brazilian teams by defeats in club world competitions
Team	Defeats
(São Paulo (state)) Palmeiras	5
(Rio de Janeiro (state)) Botafogo	3
(São Paulo (state)) Santos	2
(Rio de Janeiro (state)) Flamengo	2
(Rio de Janeiro (state)) Vasco da Gama	2
(Minas Gerais) Cruzeiro	2
(Rio de Janeiro (state)) Fluminense	2
(Rio Grande do Sul) Internacional	1
(Minas Gerais) Atlético Mineiro	1
(Rio Grande do Sul) Grêmio	1
(São Paulo (state)) São Paulo	0
(São Paulo (state)) Corinthians	0

=== Countries that Palmeiras has played in ===
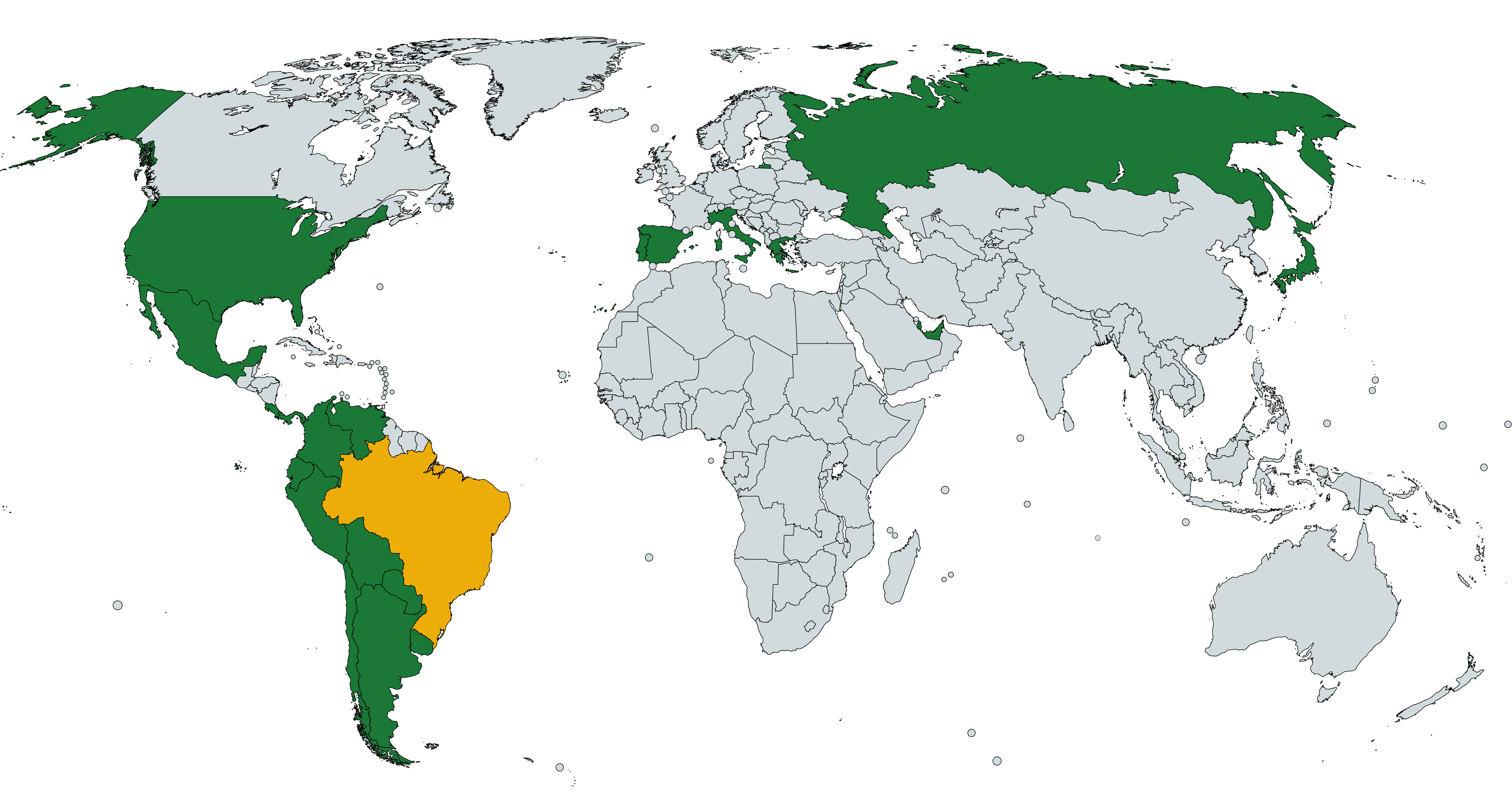
Map of nations that Palmeiras has played in.

Country
Portugal
Italy
Spain
Russia
Japan
United Arab Emirates
Qatar
United States
Mexico
Colombia
Panama
Costa Rica
Venezuela
Ecuador
Peru
Bolivia
Chile
Paraguay
Uruguay
Argentina

== See also ==
- Football in Brazil
- 1951 Copa Rio
- Sociedade Esportiva Palmeiras
