= Club Atlético Sarmiento (disambiguation) =

Club Atlético Sarmiento is a football club from Junín, Argentina. Other clubs with the same name are:

- Club Atlético Sarmiento (La Banda), a football club in Argentina
- Club Atlético Sarmiento (Resistencia), a football club in Argentina
