= Luis Valoy =

Argentine footballer (1958–2025)

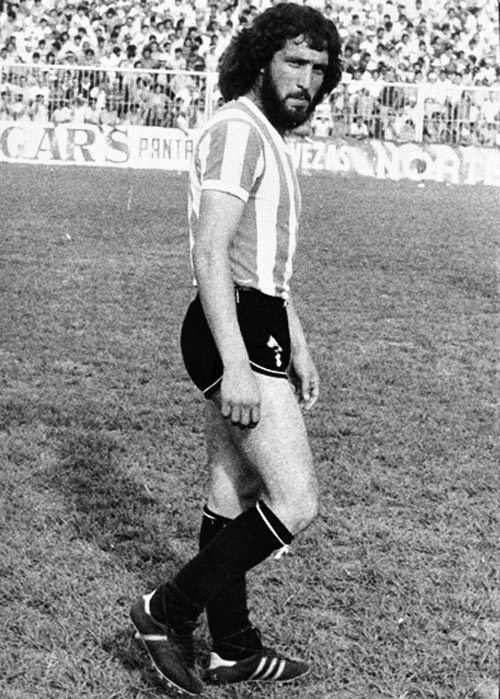
- Valoy in 1979

Personal information
- Date of birth: 1 January 1958
- Place of birth: La Banda, Santiago del Estero, Argentina
- Date of death: 6 July 2025 (aged 67)
- Place of death: La Banda, Santiago del Estero, Argentina
- Position: Midfielder

Senior career*
Years	Team	Apps	(Gls)
- Sarmiento (LB)
- Central Córdoba
- * Club domestic league appearances and goals

Luis Américo Valoy (Spanish: [ˈlwis aˈmeɾiko βaˈloj]; 1 January 1958 – 6 July 2025) was an Argentine footballer who played as a midfielder.

== Career ==
=== Sarmiento (LB) ===
Valoy started out at Sarmiento de La Banda, where he made his debut at the age of 15, in 1973. With the Banda team, he was crowned two-time champion of the Liga Santiagueña in 1978 and 1979.

=== Atlético Tucumán ===
In 1978 he joined Atlético Tucumán, that year he was crowned champion of the Liga Tucumana and participated in the National 1978, where he finished third in his group, tying on points with Huracán, but with a lower goal difference, which led to the dean's team not qualifying. In 1979, they would be crowned two-time champions of the Tucumán League and would have a great performance in the National of 1979, placing second in their zone, equaling points with Racing, and would advance to the next phase, where they eliminated Instituto, but would fail in the semifinals against Unión. 1981 would be his last year at the club.

=== Racing Club ===
In 1982, he arrived in Buenos Aires to play for Racing Club. He played at the academy until 1983, when the Avellaneda team was relegated.

=== Morón ===
In 1984 he joined Morón and in his first year he qualified for the octagonal of the First B Championship, but would fall to his former team, Racing. He played for the Gallito until 1986.

=== Chacarita ===
In 1986, he arrived at Chacarita to compete in the brand new Nacional B. He only played one season for the funeral home.

=== Laferrere ===
He played for Laferrere in the 1987–88 season.

=== All Boys ===
In the 1988–89 season, he had a brief stint at All Boys.

=== Argentino de Quilmes ===
The following season, he moved to Argentino de Quilmes, where he played one season.

=== Central Córdoba (S) ===
In 1990, he returned to his home province to play for Central Córdoba, a team that was struggling to make the league. At the end of the season, the Santiago del Estero team had to play a relegation playoff against Tigre, which they won 3-0 to avoid relegation. Valoy retired in 1994.

== Death ==
Valoy died on 6 July 2025, at the age of 67.

== Honours ==
Sarmiento (LB)

- Liga Santiagueña: 1975, 1976

Atlético Tucumán

- Tucumán League: 1978, 1979
