= Antonio Roma =

Argentine footballer (1932–2013)

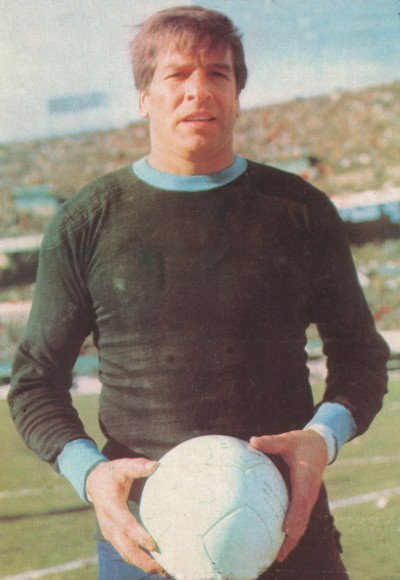
- Roma with Boca Juniors

Personal information
- Date of birth: 13 July 1932
- Place of birth: Buenos Aires, Argentina
- Date of death: 20 February 2013 (aged 80)
- Place of death: Buenos Aires, Argentina
- Height: 1.79 m (5 ft 10 in)
- Position: Goalkeeper

Senior career*
Years	Team	Apps	(Gls)
1955–1959	Ferro Carril Oeste	127	(0)
1960–1972	Boca Juniors	313	(0)
Total		408	(0)

International career
1956–1967	Argentina	42	(0)
- * Club domestic league appearances and goals

Antonio Roma (13 July 1932 – 20 February 2013) was an Argentine footballer who played as a goalkeeper, notably for Boca Juniors.

== Career ==
Nicknamed Tarzan for the way of throwing himself for the ball, he started his professional career with Ferrocarril Oeste in 1955, where he played until 1959. He was then transferred, together with teammate Silvio Marzolini, to Boca Juniors, where he debuted in the victory of 3 April 1960 against Estudiantes de La Plata.

Roma stayed with Boca until his retirement in 1972, becoming one of the biggest idols of the club, with total of 323 matches in all competitions. With the club Roma won the Argentine League of 1962, 1964, 1965, and the Campeonato Nacional 1969 and 1970. In 1969, he kept his goal clear for 783 minutes.

Probably the most remembered save by Antonio Roma was the penalty executed by River Plate's Brazilian player Delém, that he sent to the corner. With only two rounds before the end of the 1962 championship, Boca and its all-time derby River Plate shared the first position at the local league. The decisive match was played at La Bombonera, Boca Juniors home stadium. Boca was ahead 1–0 when referee Nai Foino awarded a penalty to River. After the save, the public invaded the field delaying the continuation of the match for 11 minutes. River was not able to change the score, and Boca finally won that championship after defeating Estudiantes de La Plata in the next round.

Roma also played with the Argentina national team, including at the 1962 FIFA World Cup and 1966 FIFA World Cup. He made a total of 42 appearances for his national team between 1956 and 1967.

== Honours ==
Ferro Carril Oeste

- Primera B Metropolitana: 1958

Boca Juniors

- Primera División: 1962, 1964, 1965, 1969 Nacional, 1970 Nacional
- Copa Argentina: 1969
- Copa Libertadores runner-up: 1963

Argentina

- Copa América: 1957
