= Antonio Cabrera (Argentine footballer) =

Argentine footballer

Personal information
- Full name: Antonio Roberto Cabrera
- Date of birth: 17 October 1943
- Place of birth: Buenos Aires, Argentina
- Date of death: 4 July 2021 (aged 77)
- Place of death: Buenos Aires, Argentina
- Position: Midfielder

International career
Years	Team	Apps	(Gls)
- Argentina

Antonio Roberto Cabrera (17 October 1943 – 4 July 2021) was an Argentine footballer. He competed in the men's tournament at the 1964 Summer Olympics. Cabrera died on 4 July 2021, at the age of 77.
