= Norberto Madurga =

Argentine footballer

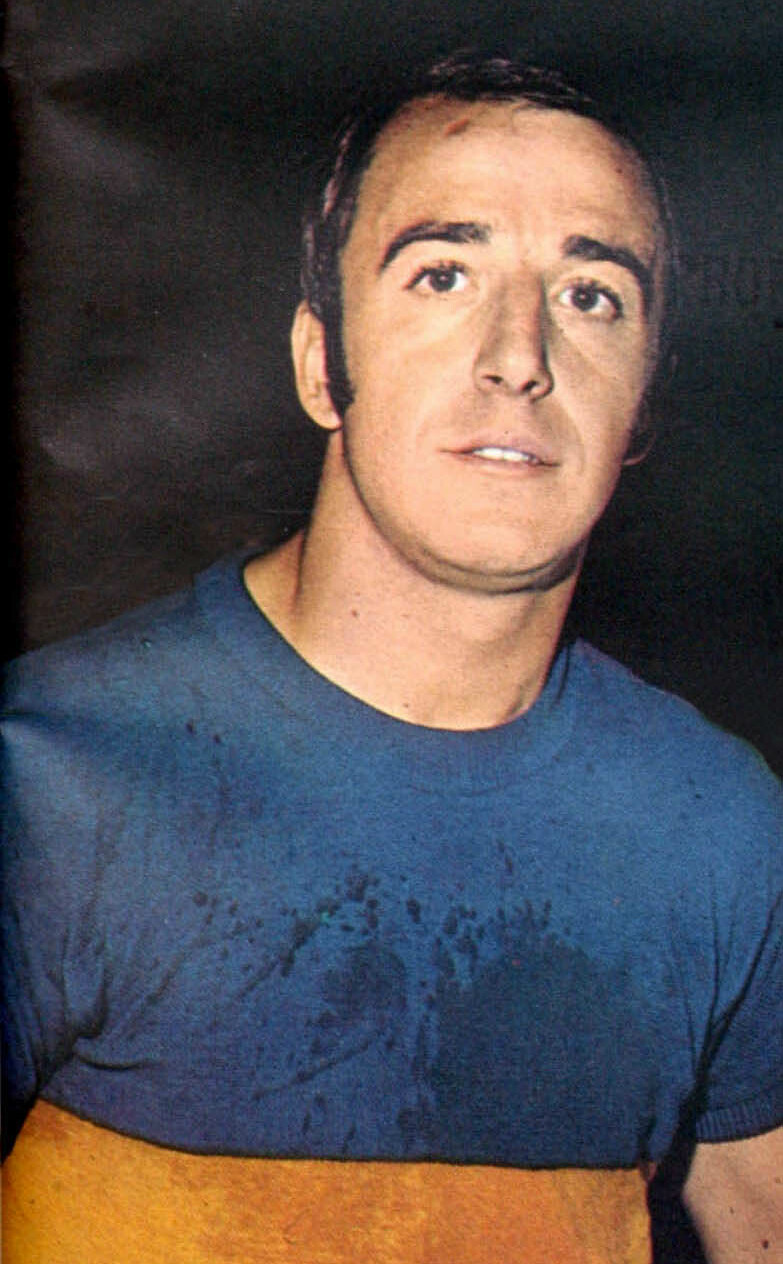
- Madurga in 1970

Personal information
- Full name: Norberto Rubén Madurga
- Date of birth: 29 December 1944 (age 81)
- Place of birth: Buenos Aires, Argentina
- Position: Midfielder

Youth career
- 1966: Atlanta

Senior career*
Years	Team	Apps	(Gls)
1966–71	Boca Juniors		
1972	Palmeiras		
1975	Banfield		

International career
1970–71	Argentina national team		
- * Club domestic league appearances and goals

Norberto Rubén Madurga (born 29 December 1944), nicknamed Muñeco, is an Argentine former footballer who played as midfielder. He spent most of his career at Boca Juniors where he won three championships. He is considered one of the club's most notable players during the 1960s.

== Biography ==
Madurga's first club was Racing, where he had been brought by coach Ernesto Duchini. Former Boca Juniors player Bernardo Gandulla (who was working in the search of young talented footballers in Atlanta) convinced Madurga to play for the Bohemio. In Atlanta, Madurga played in the youth divisions with no matches in the Primera División.

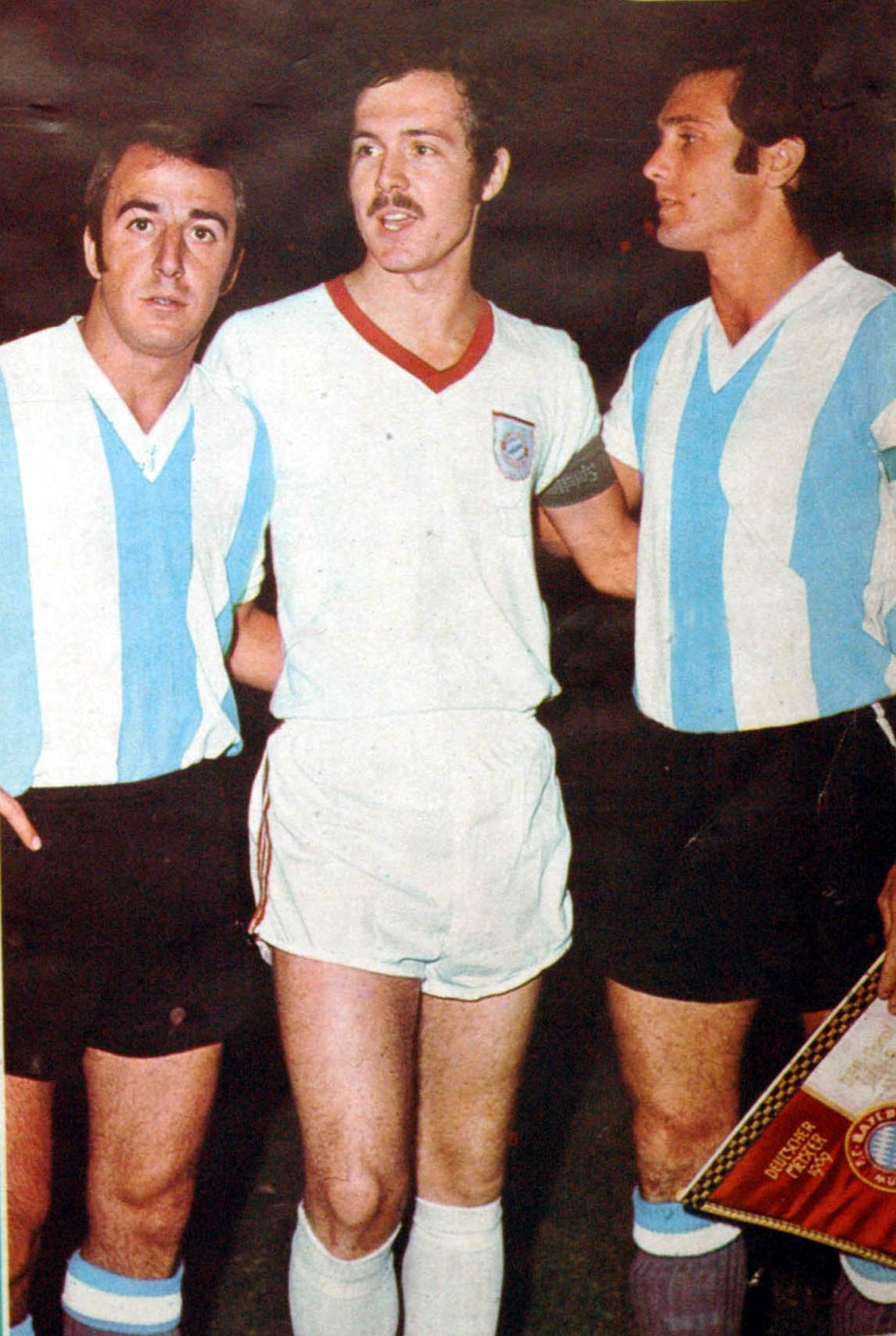
Madurga (left) with Franz Beckenbauer and Roberto Perfumo, Argentina v Bayern Munich,

After a friendly match between Boca Juniors and the Atlanta's third division in 1965, Boca Juniors showed its interest in hiring Madurga. Therefore, he was traded to the Xeneize in January 1966, with Néstor "Pipo" Rossi as coach. His debut with Boca Juniors was in the 1966 Copa Libertadores v. River Plate. The match ended 2–2 with Madurga scoring a goal. The following year, Madurga played as attacking midfielder ("n° 10")

In 1969, long-time legend Antonio Rattín was injured and coach Alfredo Di Stéfano decided Madurga to play as central midfielder, the same position as Rattín. That same year Boca won 3 titles, the Torneo de Verano (friendly preseason tournament), the 1969 Copa Argentina and the 1969 Nacional.

Madurga's skilled style of playing allowed him to serve as playmaker some times, due to his precise passes. He was also known for his attacking runs, often scoring goals.

Madurga's most memorable performance came in December 1969 when he scored two goals v. River Plate in the last fixture of the 1969 Nacional tournament. His two goals made Boca to win the championship that same day (with the match having ended in a 2–2 tie).

More than ever, football avoid children to fall into tempations such as drugs or alcohol. At 13, I was rejected by River Plate because of my thin body. That rejection taught me not to hurt the feelings of a child, never

— Norberto Madurga, Aug 2015

The game was held in the Monumental stadium and when the match ended, some River Plate's employees opened the irrigation sprinklers to avoid any kind of celebration by Boca Juniors players, nevertheless the players stayed on the field without further incidents.

At the end of 1971 he was traded to Brazilian club Palmeiras, where he would win two championships else playing for the Paulista team.

After his tenure on Palmeiras, Madurga returned to Argentina where he finished his professional career in Primera División playing for Banfield in 1975 with former teammate Nicolás Novello.

Nevertheless, in 1977 Madurga made a brief return to football, playing for Estudiantes de Río Cuarto, where was coached by Antonio Rattín. In 1980 Madurga made a new return to the sport, playing in a regional league of Buenos Aires Province, the "Liga Chivilcoense" based in the city of Chivilcoy. Madurga played for the local team Gimnasia y Esgrima de Chivilcoy.

In 2009, Madurga returned to Boca Juniors to work for the club's reserves and academy department in search of talented young players.

With the Argentina national team, Madurga played 11 matches (1970–71), scoring 3 goals.

== Titles ==
Boca Juniors

- Primera División: 1969 Nacional, 1970 Metropolitano
- Copa Argentina: 1969

Palmeiras

- Campeonato Paulista: 1972
- Campeonato Brasileiro Série A: 1972
