= 1969 Copa Argentina =

Copa Argentina
- Season: 1969
- Champions: Boca Juniors (1st. title)
- Biggest home win: Colón 5–1 Independiente
- Biggest away win: Américo Tesorieri 0–5 San Lorenzo; Colón 0–5 Boca Juniors
- Highest scoring: Guaraní A. Franco 4–4 Gimnasia y Esgrima LP

The 1969 Copa Argentina was the first edition of Copa Argentina, being held between February and July 1969. The tournament was played as a knockout competition, with the participation of 32 teams; 19 of the Primera División, 1 of the Primera B, 12 of the Regional leagues.

== Teams ==
=== Primera División ===
- Argentinos Juniors
- Atlanta
- Banfield
- Boca Juniors
- Chacarita Juniors
- Colón
- Deportivo Morón
- Gimnasia y Esgrima (LP)
- Huracán
- Independiente
- Lanús
- Los Andes
- Newell's Old Boys
- Platense
- Quilmes
- Racing
- Rosario Central
- San Lorenzo
- Unión

=== Primera B ===
- Almagro

=== Regional leagues ===
- All Boys (Santa Rosa)
- Altos Hornos Zapla
- Américo Tesorieri (La Rioja)
- Atlético Tucumán
- Central Norte
- Godoy Cruz
- Guaraní Antonio Franco
- Lipton (Corrientes)
- Los Andes (SJ)
- Sportivo Belgrano
- Sporting Punta Alta
- Sarmiento (LB)

== First round ==
Team 1	Agg.	Team 2	1st leg	2nd leg
Atlanta	3–1	Central Norte	0–1	3–0
Altos Hornos Zapla	3–2	Almagro	2–2	1–0
San Lorenzo	8–1	Américo Tesorieri	5–0	3–1
Lanús	9–4	Lipton	4–1	5–3
Guaraní Antonio Franco	6–4	Gimnasia y Esgrima (LP)	2–0	4–4
Rosario Central	7–2	Quilmes	3–2	4–0
Newell's Old Boys	3–2	Banfield	0–1	3–1
Colón	4–3	Deportivo Morón	1–1	3–2
Independiente	5–3	Unión	4–2	1–1
Huracán	3–2	Sporting Punta Alta	2–1	1–1
Platense	2–0	All Boys (SR)	1–0	1–0
Boca Juniors	3–2	Atlético Tucumán	3–2	0–0
Sarmiento (LB)	2–1	Los Andes (SJ)	2–0	0–1
Chacarita Juniors	3–2	Godoy Cruz	3–1	0–1
Racing	2–3	Los Andes	2–1	1–1

== Round of 16 ==
Round of 16
Atlanta	3	2	5
Altos Hornos Zapla	0	1	1
San Lorenzo	1	3	4
Argentinos Juniors	0	0	0
Lanús	4	3	7
Guaraní Antonio Franco	0	4	4
Rosario Central	0	3	3
Newell's Old Boys	0	2	2
Colón	1	5	6
Independiente	3	1	4
Huracán	2	3	5
Platense	4	0	4
Boca Juniors	3	4	7
Sarmiento (LB)	1	2	3
Chacarita Juniors	3	2	5
Racing	1	2	3

Quarterfinals
Atlanta	0	2	2
San Lorenzo	1	0	1
Lanús	0	1	1
Rosario Central	2	3	5
Colón	1	2	3 (3)p
Huracán	0	3	3 (2)
Boca Juniors	0	3	3
Chacarita Juniors	1	1	2

Semifinals
Atlanta	2	2	4
Rosario Central	1	1	2
Colón	0	0	0
Boca Juniors	5	1	6

Champion & Runner-Up
Atlanta	1	1	2
Boca Juniors	3	0	3

== Final ==
23 July 1969

Atlanta	1–3	Boca Juniors
de la Iglesia 72'		Ponce 18'; Madurga 53'; Peña 82'

Estadio Gasómetro, Buenos Aires
Referee: Arturo Ithurralde

27 July 1969

Boca Juniors	0–1	Atlanta
		Collado 63'

Estadio Gasómetro, Buenos Aires
Referee: Aurelio Bossolino

Boca Juniors won 3–2 on aggregate.
