= Ramón Héctor Ponce =

Argentine footballer (1948–2019)

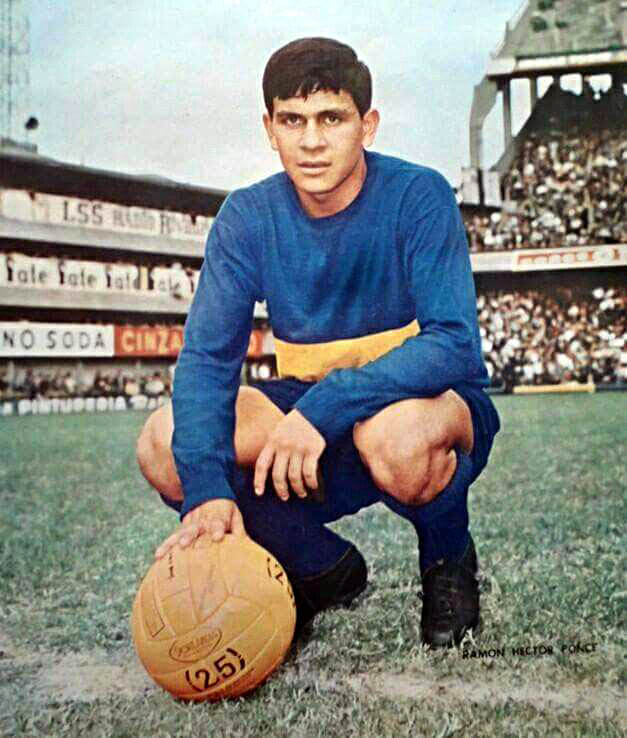
Ponce with Boca Juniors in 1966

Ramón Héctor Ponce (July 5, 1948 in Corrientes, Argentina – July 7, 2019) was an Argentine professional footballer who played in Argentina, Chile and Canada.

== Teams ==
- Boca Juniors 1966–1974
- Gimnasia y Esgrima de La Plata 1975
- Quilmes 1976
- Colo-Colo 1976–1980
- Calgary Boomers 1981

== Titles ==
- Boca Juniors 1969 and 1970 (Argentine Championship)
- Colo-Colo 1979 (Chilean Championship)
