= Club Atlético Sarmiento (La Banda) =

Sarmiento
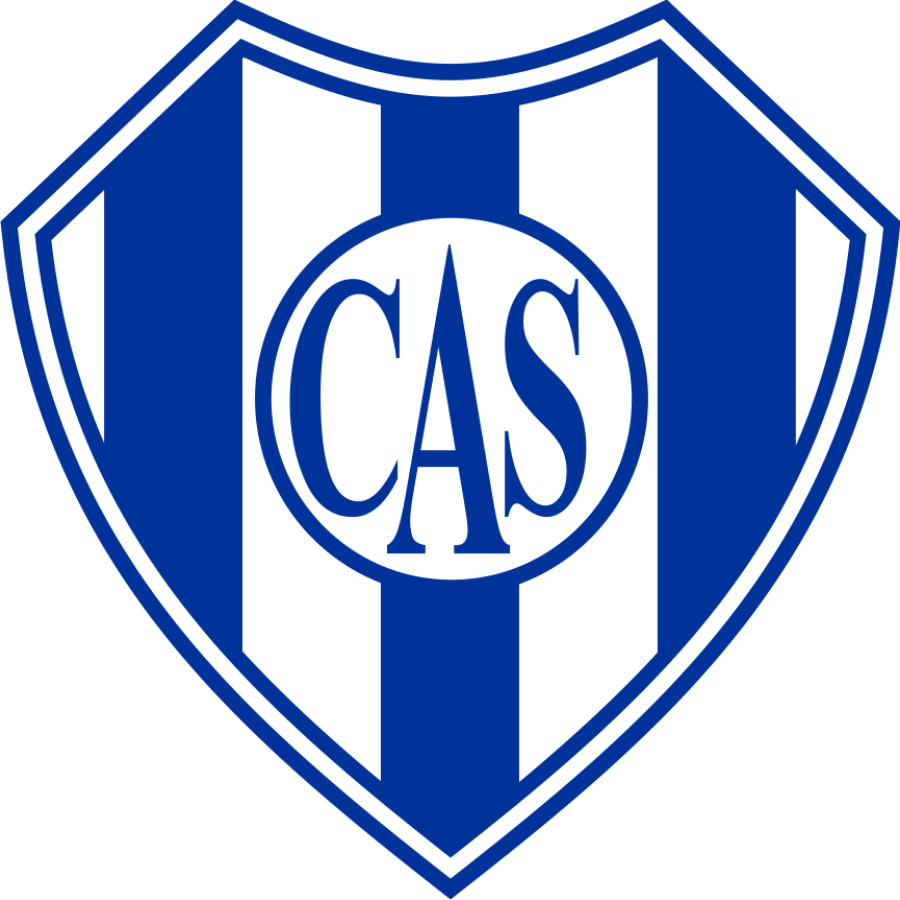
- Full name: Club Atlético Sarmiento
- Nicknames: El profesor (The teacher)
- Founded: 16 April 1909; 117 years ago
- Ground: Ciudad de La Banda
- Capacity: 8,000
- President: Pablo Rojo
- Coach: Pablo Martel
- League: Torneo Regional Federal Amateur
- 2023-24: ▲ Winner (ascent to Torneo Federal A)
Home colours	Away colours

Club Atlético Sarmiento is a sports club of the city of La Banda, Santiago del Estero Province, Argentina, whose main sporting activity is football. It was founded on 16 April 1909, and is the oldest club in this city. From 2024, will participate in the Torneo Federal A.

It is one of the oldest clubs in the province of Santiago del Estero and it is the most popular team of La Banda.

During its history, the club has stood out in football, where it won a total of twenty-five occasions in the Liga Santiagueña de Fútbol, being the third most awarded team in this competition. At the National level consecrated Torneo del Interior 2010 (fifth category) and of the Torneo Federal Amateur 2023-24 (fourth category). Together with Club Central Argentino, contests the Classical Bandeño.

The colors that identify it are white with blue bands. Its stadium is located in the downtown area of the city of La Banda, with a capacity of 8000 people.

In addition to football, Club Atlético Sarmiento has other disciplines: taekwondo, boxing, kickboxing, volleyball, hockey on lawn, judo and crossfit.

== History ==
The Club Sarmiento was born in the neighbourhood centre of La Banda, very near the old temple Santiago Apostol, among the streets Pedro León Gallo, Balcarce, Garay, Moreno, and Avellaneda, in a wasteland surrounded by gypsy tents, there by 1900 to 1905. In its beginnings called "Club Normal" from its first affiliate, they were students, teachers, and tutors of the "Dr. José B. Gorostiaga".

It had its origins in the merger of two small clubs that disputed the supremacy of the game of football in La Banda. One leader was Don José María Heredia and the other was Don Julio Trejo, who, tired of fighting, decided to merge through willpower. On 16 April 1909, they held an assembly by common agreement, where they resolved to establish a solo club. To baptize the nascent institution, he proposed two names: one of the former president Domingo Faustino Sarmiento and one of the Almirante Brown, winning the vote the name of the first. From there, the club became known as Club Atlético Sarmiento.

Años más tarde, un empleado que controlaba el funcionamiento del canal bandeño (de apellido Macció), gestionó la donación del terreno que actualmente ocupa. El primer presidente de Sarmiento fue el señor Ramón Rosa Pérez. Entre los presidentes que se destacaron por su sacrificio en bien de la instalación figuran Juan Jiménez García, Dr. Mario Ledesma, R. Máculus, César H. López, Manuel Bellido, E. Carabajal, Dr. Adle, Prof. Suárez, Prof. Ledesma, Dr. Montes, Buti Suárez, Dr. Julio Fields, Fields, Tagliapietra, Walter Lamb, Emir Faisal, Chiqui Suárez, entre otros.

In the 20s and 30s, the perimeter walls, Olympic stands, and official wire fences were built.

In the football history of Club Atlético Sarmiento the notable names of Coco Gallardo, Manuel Bellido, Eberto Lencinas, Luis Mora, Ramón Barraza (father and son), the Urquiza brothers, The left hand Sayago, Carrillo, Moscardini, Toto Suárez, Orlando Suárez, appear. Pepe Casado, Albarracín, Macció, Américo Santillán, Pepe Bellido, Padilla, Gringo Bobba, Jorge, Ávila, López, Carabajal, Paz, Soria, Lastra, Casado, Avallay, Alzogaray, Ledesma and the keepers Aguirre, Leiva, Generoso, Ruiz, Cavalieri, among others. Zurdo Sayago and Coco Gallardo were shortlisted for big football.

Sarmiento achieved important achievements, the first Santiago team affiliated with the Argentine Football Association in 1917, but the most important participations were in 1982 and 1996. Previously in 1969, he participated in the 1969 Copa Argentina, where was defeated by Boca Juniors in the eighth round of the final.

In 1982 he made his debut in the former Torneo Regional of the AFA, where was deleted by Atlético Concepción of the Banda del Río Salí, Tucumán in the last meeting in the Northern Zone. In the Argentinian Tournament B 1995-96 lost the final with Almirante Brown de Arrecifes and the possibility to ascend to the Torneo Argentino A.

In 2010, after seven consecutive participations, he became champion of the Torneo del Interior when winning in the final to Club Atlético Paraná and attained the ascent to the Torneo Argentino B.

On 12 February 2024, Sarmiento played the final of the Torneo Regional Federal Amateur contested in the Estadio Bicentenario of Catamarca, where achieved the historical ascent to the Torneo Federal A against Altos Hornos Zapla of Jujuy by winning 3 to 0. The champion's goals were scored by Rodrigo Herrera, Claudio Vega and Pablo López.

== Seasons ==
Total of seasons in AFA: 24

- Seasons in first division: 0
- Seasons in second division: 1
  - Torneo Regional: 1 (1982)
    - Better position in second division: Phase of groups (1982)
- Seasons in third division: 1
  - Torneo Federal A: 1 (2024)
- Seasons in fourth division: 16
  - Torneo Argentino B: 7 (1995/96 - 1996/97, 2003/04, 2010/11 - 2013/14)
  - Torneo Federal B: 5 (2014 - 2017)
  - Torneo Regional Federal Amateur: 4 (2019, 2021/22 - 2023/24)
    - Better position in fourth division: 1.° (2023/24)
    - Worse position in fourth division: First phase (7 times)
- Seasons in fifth division: 6
  - Torneo del Interior: 6 (2005 - 2010)
    - Better position in fifth division: 1.° (2010)
    - Worse position in fifth division: First phase (twice)
- Participations in national Cups: 2
  - Copa Argentina: 2 (1969, 2025)
    - Better position in Copa Argentina: Eighth of final (1969)

== List of winners ==
National tournaments
Competition	Titles	Runners-up
Fourth division
Torneo Argentino B (0/1)		1995/96
Torneo Regional Federal Amateur (1/0)	2023/24
Fifth division
Torneo del Interior (1/0)	2010
Regional tournaments
Competition	Titles	Runners-up
Liga Santiagueña de Fútbol (25)	1932, 1934, 1937, 1947, 1982, 1984, 1987, 1996 (2), 1998 (2), 2002, 2003 (2), 2005 (2), 2006, 2007, 2009, 2010, 2017 (2), 2018	Unknown
