= Nicolás Novello =

Argentine-Italian football player and coach (born 1946)

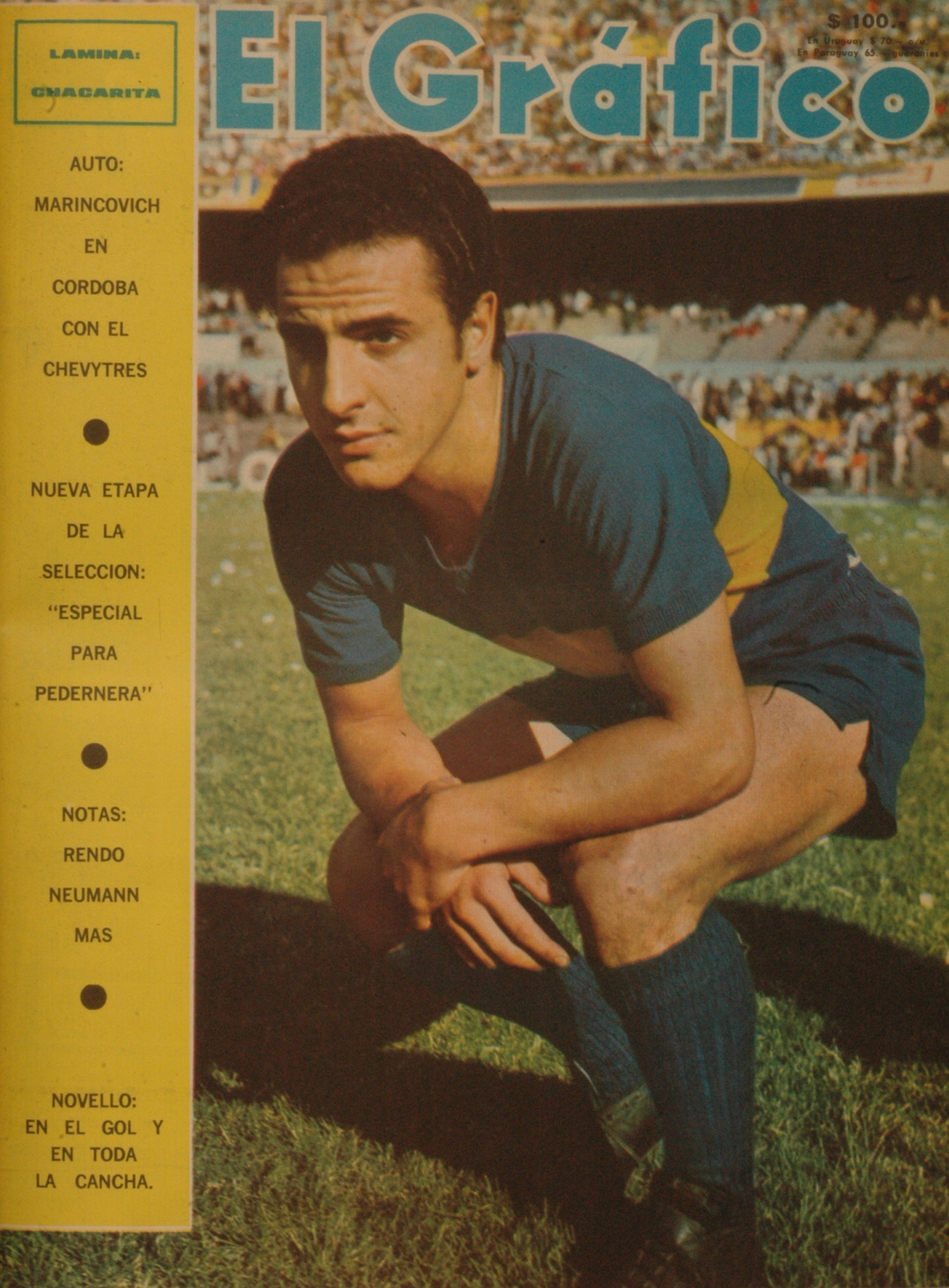
Novello in a 1969 edition of El Grafico

Nicolás Novello (born 20 May 1946) is an Argentine-Italian former football player and head coach. A forward, he played for clubs in Argentina, Chile and Mexico.

== Playing career ==
Novello was born in Cosenza, Italy. He played for Argentine club Boca Juniors, with whom he won the Argentine Primera División in 1969 and 1970 and the Copa Argentina in 1969.

- Boca Juniors 1966–1972
- Atlante 1973
- Boca Juniors 1974
- Banfield 1975
- Unión Española 1976–1978

== Coaching career ==
- Unión Española 1981
- Boca Juniors (Inferiors) 1989–1995

== Honours ==
=== Player ===
Boca Juniors

- Argentine Primera División: 1969, 1970
- Copa Argentina: 1969

Unión Española

- Chilean Primera División: 1977
