= 2017–18 Club Olimpo season =

Club Olimpo
2017–18 season
- President: Alfredo Dagna
- Manager: Mario Sciacqua (until 17 October 2017); Rubén Forestello (from 19 October 2017 to 12 December 2017)
- Stadium: Estadio Roberto Natalio Carminatti
- Primera División: 26th
- 2016–17 Copa Argentina: Quarter-finals
- 2017–18 Copa Argentina: Round of 64
- Top goalscorer: League: Two players (3); All: Three players (3)

The 2017–18 season was Club Olimpo's 6th consecutive season in the top-flight of Argentine football. The season covers the period from 1 July 2017 to 30 June 2018.

== Current squad ==
As of 16 September 2017.

Note: Flags indicate national team as defined under FIFA eligibility rules; some limited exceptions apply. Players may hold more than one non-FIFA nationality.

No.	Pos.	Nation	Player
1	GK	ARG	Adrián Gabbarini
3	DF	ARG	Cristian Villanueva
5	MF	ARG	Lucas Villarruel (on loan from Huracán (BA))
13	DF	ARG	Nicolás Herranz
16	MF	ARG	Said Llambay
17	MF	ARG	Lautaro Belleggia
18	MF	ARG	Jonathan Blanco
19	MF	URU	Emiliano Tellechea
20	MF	ARG	David Vega
21	FW	ARG	Matías Mayer
25	DF	ARG	Nicolás Pantaleone
26	GK	ARG	Sebastián Anchoverri
27	MF	ARG	Rodrigo Cabalucci
28	FW	ARG	Franco Troyansky
29	FW	ARG	Eial Strahman

No.	Pos.	Nation	Player
32	FW	PAR	Orlando Gaona Lugo
37	MF	ARG	Facundo García
—	DF	ARG	Cristian Nasuti
—	FW	SVK	David Depetris (on loan from Huracán (BA))
—	MF	ARG	Franco Bellocq (on loan from Independiente)
—	DF	ARG	Lucas Mancinelli
—	FW	ARG	Luis Vila
—	DF	ARG	Matías Cahais
—	DF	ARG	Mauricio Rosales (on loan from Estudiantes)
—	MF	ARG	Maximiliano Fornari
—	MF	VEN	Michael Covea
—	DF	ARG	Pedro Silva (on loan from Boca Juniors)
—	FW	ARG	Ramón Lentini
—	DF	ARG	Sergio Ojeda (on loan from Independiente)
—	MF	ARG	Tomás Costa

=== Out on loan ===
Note: Flags indicate national team as defined under FIFA eligibility rules; some limited exceptions apply. Players may hold more than one non-FIFA nationality.

No.	Pos.	Nation	Player
15	FW	ARG	Ezequiel Vidal (at Juventud until 31 December 2016)
23	MF	ARG	Julián Fernández (at Palestino until 30 June 2018)
30	MF	ARG	Martín Pérez Guedes (at Mitre until 30 June 2018)

No.	Pos.	Nation	Player
—	DF	ARG	Adrián Martínez (at Guillermo Brown until 30 June 2018)
—	GK	ARG	Nereo Champagne (at Leganés until 30 June 2018)

== Transfers ==
=== In ===
Date	Pos.	Name	From	Fee
20 July 2017	DF	(Argentina) Lucas Mancinelli	(Argentina) Temperley	Undisclosed
21 July 2017	DF	(Argentina) Cristian Nasuti	(Argentina) Vélez Sarsfield	Undisclosed
21 July 2017	DF	(Argentina) Matías Cahais	(Mexico) Veracruz	Undisclosed
21 July 2017	MF	(Argentina) Maximiliano Fornari	(Argentina) Sarmiento	Undisclosed
21 July 2017	MF	(Venezuela) Michael Covea	(Venezuela) Deportivo La Guaira	Undisclosed
31 July 2017	FW	(Argentina) Luis Vila	(Argentina) Gimnasia y Esgrima (J)	Undisclosed
6 August 2017	FW	(Argentina) Ramón Lentini	(Argentina) San Martín (T)	Undisclosed
19 August 2017	MF	(Argentina) Tomás Costa	(Uruguay) Peñarol	Undisclosed

=== Out ===
Date	Pos.	Name	To	Fee
1 July 2017	FW	(Colombia) José Erick Correa	(Colombia) Deportes Tolima	Undisclosed
6 July 2017	DF	(Argentina) Néstor Moiraghi	(Colombia) Deportivo Cali	Undisclosed
15 July 2017	DF	(Argentina) Ezequiel Parnisari	(Argentina) Aldosivi	Undisclosed
23 July 2017	FW	(Argentina) Maximiliano Pérez	(Uruguay) Fénix	Undisclosed
28 July 2017	FW	(Argentina) Fernando Coniglio	(Argentina) Huracán (BA)	Undisclosed
31 July 2017	FW	(Argentina) Lucas García	(Austria) SK Bischofshofen	Undisclosed
4 August 2017	DF	(Argentina) Nicolás Álvarez	(Argentina) Los Andes	Undisclosed
8 August 2017	MF	(Argentina) Federico Freire	(Argentina) Estudiantes (SL)	Undisclosed
6 September 2017	DF	(Argentina) Joel Sacks	(Argentina) Mitre	Undisclosed
7 September 2017	MF	(Argentina) José D'Angelo	(Argentina) San Telmo	Undisclosed

=== Loan in ===
Date from	Date to	Pos.	Name	From
18 July 2017	30 June 2018	DF	(Argentina) Pedro Silva	(Argentina) Boca Juniors
25 July 2017	30 June 2018	DF	(Argentina) Sergio Ojeda	(Argentina) Independiente
26 July 2017	30 June 2018	MF	(Argentina) Franco Bellocq	(Argentina) Independiente
1 August 2017	30 June 2018	DF	(Argentina) Mauricio Rosales	(Argentina) Estudiantes
30 August 2017	30 June 2018	FW	(Slovakia) David Depetris	(Argentina) Huracán (BA)

=== Loan out ===
Date from	Date to	Pos.	Name	To
7 July 2017	30 June 2018	MF	(Argentina) Julián Fernández	(Chile) Palestino
25 July 2017	30 June 2018	GK	(Argentina) Nereo Champagne	(Spain) Leganés
9 August 2017	31 December 2017	FW	(Argentina) Ezequiel Vidal	(Uruguay) Juventud
20 August 2017	30 June 2018	DF	(Argentina) Adrián Martínez	(Argentina) Guillermo Brown

== Friendlies ==
=== Pre-season ===
Win Draw Loss

26 July 2017 Friendly	Olimpo (Argentina)	1–0	(Argentina) Liniers	Vicente López, Argentina
15:00	M. Mayer 20'	Report		Stadium: Club Telefonos de Buenos Aires

26 July 2017 Friendly	Olimpo (Argentina)	4–3	(Argentina) Liniers	Vicente López, Argentina
16:30	A. Rodriguez 30'; A. Martinez; E. Tellechea; R. Caballuci	Report	E. Dindart; L. Dezi; M. Di Santoro	Stadium: Club Telefonos de Buenos Aires

29 July 2017 Friendly	Olimpo (Argentina)	0–0	(Argentina) Sansinena	Vicente López, Argentina
		Report		Stadium: Club Telefonos de Buenos Aires

29 July 2017 Friendly	Olimpo (Argentina)	1–1	(Argentina) Sansinena	Vicente López, Argentina
	E. Strahaman	Report	C. Curuchet	Stadium: Club Telefonos de Buenos Aires

2 August 2017 Friendly	Olimpo (Argentina)	2–1	(Argentina) Huracán (IW)	Bahía Blanca, Argentina
	Goal	Report	Goal	Stadium: Estadio Roberto Natalio Carminatti

2 August 2017 Friendly	Olimpo (Argentina)	4–0	(Argentina) Huracán (IW)	Bahía Blanca, Argentina
15:00	F. Troyansky; J. Blanco; E. Correa	Report		Stadium: Estadio Roberto Natalio Carminatti

5 August 2017 Friendly	Patronato (Argentina)	1–2	(Argentina) Olimpo	Paraná, Argentina
	B. Cáceres	Report	E. Tellechea; J. Blanco	Stadium: Estadio Presbítero Bartolomé Grella

5 August 2017 Friendly	Patronato (Argentina)	0–3	(Argentina) Olimpo	Paraná, Argentina
		Report	F. Troyansky; M. Covea; M. Fornari	Stadium: Estadio Presbítero Bartolomé Grella

10 August 2017 Friendly	Colón (Argentina)	3–1	(Argentina) Olimpo	Santa Fe, Argentina
10:00	C. Guanca; N. Leguizamón	Report	Goal

19 August 2017 Friendly	Olimpo (Argentina)	0–0	(Argentina) Deportivo Roca	Bahía Blanca, Argentina
		Report		Stadium: Estadio Roberto Natalio Carminatti

19 August 2017 Friendly	Olimpo (Argentina)	0–1	(Argentina) Sansinena	Bahía Blanca, Argentina
		Report	Goal	Stadium: Predio Teléfonos

=== Mid-season ===
Win Draw Loss

4 September 2017 Friendly	Olimpo (Argentina)	1–0	(Argentina) Sansinena	Bahía Blanca, Argentina
	M. Covea	Report

== Primera División ==
=== League table ===
Pos	Team	Pld	W	D	L	GF	GA	GD	Pts
24	Tigre	27	4	12	11	26	33	−7	24
25	Temperley	27	5	8	14	22	46	−24	23
26	Chacarita Juniors	27	4	6	17	23	40	−17	18
27	Arsenal	27	3	8	16	19	36	−17	17
28	Olimpo	27	3	6	18	16	50	−34	15

Source: AFA
Rules for classification: 1) points; 2) play-off (only if needed to decide championship); 3) goal difference; 4) goals scored; 5) head-to-head points; 6) head-to-head goal difference; 7) head-to-head goals scored.

=== Results by matchday ===
Matchday	1	2	3	4	5	6	7	8	9	10	11	12	13	14	15	16	17	18	19	20	21	22	23	24	25	26	27
Ground	A	H	A	H	A	H	A	A	H	A	H	A	H														
Result	L	D	L	L	L	L	D	W	D	L	W	L															
Position	27	23	26	27	28	28	28	25	26	27	24	26															

Updated to match(es) played on 12 December 2017. Source: Soccerway
A = Away; H = Home; W = Win; D = Draw; L = Loss

27 August 2017 1	Boca Juniors (Argentina)	3–0	(Argentina) Olimpo	Buenos Aires, Argentina
18:05	D. Benedetto 8', 85' (pen.); P. Pérez 42'	Report		Stadium: La Bombonera; Referee: Néstor Pitana (Argentina)

8 September 2017 2	Olimpo (Argentina)	1–1	(Argentina) Independiente	Bahía Blanca, Argentina
21:15	L. Vila 71'	Report	L. Fernández 34'	Stadium: Estadio Roberto Natalio Carminatti; Referee: Diego Abal (Argentina)

16 September 2017 3	Newell's Old Boys (Argentina)	2–0	(Argentina) Olimpo	Rosario, Argentina
16:15	L. Leal 69'; J. Torres 75'	Report		Stadium: Estadio Marcelo Bielsa; Referee: Pablo Echavarría (Argentina)

24 September 2017 4	Olimpo (Argentina)	0–1	(Argentina) Gimnasia y Esgrima (LP)	Bahía Blanca, Argentina
14:05		Report	B. Alemán 26'	Stadium: Estadio Roberto Natalio Carminatti; Referee: Darío Herrera (Argentina)

29 September 2017 5	Unión Santa Fe (Argentina)	2–0	(Argentina) Olimpo	Santa Fe, Argentina
19:05	F. Soldano 46'; L. Gamba 53'	Report		Stadium: Estadio 15 de Abril; Referee: Pedro Argañaraz (Argentina)

16 October 2017 6	Olimpo (Argentina)	0–2	(Argentina) Huracán (BA)	Bahía Blanca, Argentina
19:05		Report	F. Coniglio 33'; M. Bogado 79'	Stadium: Estadio Roberto Natalio Carminatti; Referee: Fernando Espinoza (Argentina)

30 October 2017 7	Defensa y Justicia (Argentina)	1–1	(Argentina) Olimpo	Buenos Aires, Argentina
19:05	F. Márquez 23'	Report	D. Depetris 86'	Stadium: Estadio Norberto "Tito" Tomaghello; Referee: Fernando Rapallini (Argentina)

4 November 2017 8	Lanús (Argentina)	0–2	(Argentina) Olimpo	Lanús, Argentina
14:05		Report	D. Depetris 25'; F. Troyansky 68'	Stadium: Estadio Ciudad de Lanús – Néstor Díaz Pérez; Referee: Silvio Trucco (Argentina)

20 November 2017 9	Olimpo (Argentina)	1–1	(Argentina) Godoy Cruz	Bahía Blanca, Argentina
19:15	F. Troyansky 30'	Report	S. García 62'	Stadium: Estadio Roberto Natalio Carminatti; Referee: Ariel Penel (Argentina)

27 November 2017 10	Vélez Sarsfield (Argentina)	3–0	(Argentina) Olimpo	Buenos Aires, Argentina
19:15	F. Cubero 57'; G. Bergessio 79', 87'	Report		Stadium: José Amalfitani Stadium; Referee: Pablo Echavarría (Argentina)

2 December 2017 11	Olimpo (Argentina)	2–0	(Argentina) Chacarita Juniors	Bahía Blanca, Argentina
17:00	D. Depetris 38'; M. Fornari 47'	Report		Stadium: Estadio Roberto Natalio Carminatti; Referee: Néstor Pitana (Argentina)

8 December 2017 12	Patronato (Argentina)	1–0	(Argentina) Olimpo	Paraná, Argentina
19:15	S. Ribas 78'	Report		Stadium: Estadio Presbítero Bartolomé Grella; Referee: Silvio Trucco (Argentina)

January 2018 13	Olimpo (Argentina)	–	(Argentina) Belgrano	Bahía Blanca, Argentina
		Report		Stadium: Estadio Roberto Natalio Carminatti

== Copa Argentina ==
Win Draw Loss

1 September 2017 R32	Racing Club (Argentina)	2–4	(Argentina) Olimpo	Banfield, Argentina
15:00	M. Zaracho 39'; D. González 45'	Report	E. Tellechea 55' (pen.); T. Costa 69'; F. Troyansky 71'; L. Vila 90+4'	Stadium: Estadio Florencio Sola; Referee: Ariel Penel (Argentina)

4 October 2017 R16	Olimpo (Argentina)	3–2	(Argentina) Gimnasia y Esgrima (M)	Buenos Aires, Argentina
15:40	D. Mondino 26' (o.g.); E. Tellechea 38', 53'	Report	M. Ramírez 42'; P. Cortizo 54'	Stadium: Estadio Julio Humberto Grondona; Referee: Nicolás Lamolina (Argentina)

23 October 2017 QF	Olimpo (Argentina)	0–1	(Argentina) Deportivo Morón	Lanús, Argentina
21:10		Report	J. Rossi 54'	Stadium: Estadio Ciudad de Lanús – Néstor Díaz Pérez; Referee: Darío Herrera (Argentina)
