= 2022 Torneo Federal A =

X Torneo Federal A
- Season: 2022
- Champions: Racing (C) (3rd divisional title)
- Promoted: Racing (C)
- Relegated: Atlético Paraná; Deportivo Camioneros; Desamparados; Juventud Unida (G)
- Matches played: 559
- Goals scored: 1,151 (2.06 per match)
- Biggest home win: Olimpo 5-0 Sportivo Peñarol (April 24)
- Biggest away win: Juventud Antoniana 0-4 Racing (C) (April 17)
- Highest scoring: Gimnasia y Tiro 4-3 Douglas Haig (July 20)
- All statistics correct as of November 13, 2022.

The 2022 Argentine Torneo Federal A was the tenth season of the Torneo Federal A, the regionalised third tier of the Argentine football league system. The tournament is reserved for teams indirectly affiliated to the Asociación del Fútbol Argentino (AFA), while teams affiliated to AFA have to play the Primera B Metropolitana, which is the other third tier competition. The competition was contested by 29 of the 31 teams that took part in the 2021 season and four teams promoted from Torneo Regional Federal Amateur. Two teams will be promoted to Primera Nacional and four teams were relegated to Torneo Regional Federal Amateur. The season began on 27 march and ended in 13 November 2022.

== Format ==
=== First stage ===
The 34 teams were split into two zones of 17 teams, where they will play against the other teams in their group twice: once at home and once away. The top eight teams from each zone qualified for the final stages.

=== Final Stages ===
The final stages was played between the 16 teams that qualified from the first stage. They were seeded in the final stages according to their results in the first stage, with the best eight seeded 1–8, and the worst eight teams seeded 9–16. The teams played four rounds and the winner was declared champion and automatically promoted to the Primera Nacional.

=== Relegation ===
After the first stage, the two bottom teams of each zone were relegated to the Torneo Regional Federal Amateur, giving a total of four teams relegated.

== Club information ==
Locations of the 2022 season teams.
Yellow: Zone A; Blue: Zone B.

=== Zone A ===
Team	City	Stadium
Argentino	Monte Maíz	Modesto Marrone
Cipolletti	Cipolletti	La Visera de Cemento
Círculo Deportivo	Comandante Nicanor Otamendi	Guillermo Trama
Ciudad de Bolivar	San Carlos de Bolívar	Municipal Eva Perón
Deportivo Camioneros	General Rodríguez	Hugo Moyano
Desamparados	San Juan	El Serpentario
Estudiantes	San Luis	Héctor Odicino – Pedro Benoza
Ferro Carril Oeste	General Pico	El Coloso del Barrio Talleres
Huracán Las Heras	Las Heras	General San Martín
Independiente	Chivilcoy	Raúl Orlando Lungarzo
Juventud Unida Universitario	San Luis	Mario Diez
Liniers	Bahía Blanca	Alejandro Pérez
Olimpo	Bahía Blanca	Roberto Natalio Carminatti
Sansinena	General Cerri	Luis Molina
Sol de Mayo	Viedma	Sol de Mayo
Sportivo Peñarol	Chimbas	Ramón Pablo Rojas
Villa Mitre	Bahía Blanca	El Fortín

=== Zone B ===
Team	City	Stadium
Atlético Paraná	Paraná	Pedro Mutio
Boca Unidos	Corrientes	José Antonio Romero Feris
Central Norte	Salta	Doctor Luis Güemes
Crucero del Norte	Garupá	Andrés Guacurarí
Defensores	Pronunciamiento	Delio Cardozo
Defensores de Belgrano	Villa Ramallo	Salomón Boeseldín
Douglas Haig	Pergamino	Miguel Morales
Gimnasia y Esgrima	Concepción del Uruguay	Manuel y Ramón Núñez
Gimnasia y Tiro	Salta	Gigante del Norte
Juventud Antoniana	Salta	Fray Honorato Pistoia
Juventud Unida	Gualeguaychú	De los Eucaliptos
Racing	Córdoba	Miguel Sancho
San Martín	Formosa	17 De Octubre
Sarmiento	Resistencia	Centenario
Sportivo Belgrano	San Francisco	Oscar Boero
Sportivo Las Parejas	Las Parejas	Fortaleza del Lobo
Unión	Sunchales	La Fortaleza

== First stage ==
=== Zone A ===
Pos	Team	Pld	W	D	L	GF	GA	GD	Pts	Qualification or Relegation
1	Olimpo	32	22	7	3	53	19	+34	73	Advance to Final Stages and qualification for Copa Argentina
2	Villa Mitre	32	16	9	7	42	25	+17	57	Advance to Final Stages and qualification for Copa Argentina
3	Ciudad de Bolivar	32	14	7	11	30	28	+2	49	Advance to Final Stages and qualification for Copa Argentina
4	Independiente (Ch)	32	12	11	9	33	22	+11	47	Advance to Final Stages and qualification for Copa Argentina
5	Sol de Mayo	32	12	10	10	32	26	+6	46 (Note: Sol de Mayo ahead of Estudiantes (SL) on head-to-head points: Sol de Mayo–Estudiantes (SL) 1–0, Estudiantes (SL)–Sol de Mayo 0–0.)	Advance to Final Stages and qualification for Copa Argentina
6	Estudiantes (SL)	32	13	7	12	34	29	+5	46	Advance to Final Stages
7	Juventud Unida Universitario	32	10	15	7	28	25	+3	45	Advance to Final Stages
8	Sansinena	32	12	6	14	44	42	+2	42	Advance to Final Stages
9	Argentino (MM)	32	10	10	12	29	34	−5	40	
10	Cipolletti	32	9	11	12	26	35	−9	38	
11	Sportivo Peñarol	32	9	10	13	31	42	−11	37	
12	Liniers (BB)	32	8	12	12	34	44	−10	36 (Note: Liniers (BB) ahead of Círculo Deportivo on head-to-head away goals: Liniers (BB)–Círculo Deportivo 0–0, Círculo Deportivo–Liniers (BB) 1–1.)	
13	Círculo Deportivo	32	9	9	14	31	40	−9	36	
14	Huracán Las Heras (Note: Huracán Las Heras was deducted 15 points due to incidents, later reduced to 3 points.)	32	8	14	10	23	26	−3	35 (Note: Huracán Las Heras ahead of Ferro Carril Oeste (GP) on head-to-head away goals: Huracán Las Heras–Ferro Carril Oeste (GP) 0–0, Ferro Carril Oeste (GP)–Huracán Las Heras 1–1.)	
15	Ferro Carril Oeste (GP)	32	8	11	13	28	32	−4	35	
16	Desamparados (R)	32	7	13	12	24	36	−12	34	Relegated to Torneo Regional Federal Amateur
17	Deportivo Camioneros (R)	32	7	10	15	27	44	−17	31	Relegated to Torneo Regional Federal Amateur

Updated to match(es) played on October 16, 2022. Source: AFA
Rules for classification: 1) points; 2) Head-to-head points; 3) Head-to-head goal difference; 4) Head-to-head goals scored; 5) Head-to-head away goals; 6) goal difference; 7) goals scored; 8) away goals scored; 9) draw of lots.
(R) Relegated

==== Results ====
Home \ Away	ARG	CIP	CIR	CIU	DEP	DES	ESL	FCO	HLH	ICH	JUU	LIN	OLI	SAN	SOL	SPP	VMI
Argentino (MM)		1–0	3–1	4–1	3–0	0–0	0–2	0–1	1–0	1–2	1–0	1–0	0–1	1–2	0–0	0–1	1–1
Cipolletti	1–0		4–2	0–0	1–1	2–0	0–0	1–0	1–0	0–0	1–3	1–2	0–2	1–0	1–1	1–1	1–0
Círculo Deportivo	3–0	1–0		1–0	1–1	2–2	0–2	2–1	1–0	2–2	1–0	1–1	0–0	1–2	1–0	2–2	1–0
Ciudad de Bolivar	1–0	0–0	1–0		1–2	1–1	2–1	2–0	1–1	1–0	2–1	2–1	2–0	1–0	1–0	1–1	1–2
Deportivo Camioneros	1–2	1–0	0–1	0–1		2–0	2–1	0–0	0–0	0–4	0–0	2–2	1–2	3–1	1–0	2–1	0–0
Desamparados	0–1	1–1	3–0	2–1	1–0		0–0	0–1	0–0	1–0	2–0	2–0	0–1	1–1	1–0	0–0	0–0
Estudiantes (SL)	4–0	3–1	1–0	1–0	2–1	2–1		2–2	2–1	1–0	0–1	1–1	0–1	1–0	0–0	4–1	0–1
Ferro Carril Oeste (GP)	1–1	0–0	2–1	3–0	0–0	3–1	2–0		1–1	0–1	0–1	1–3	0–1	2–1	0–1	3–0	1–1
Huracán Las Heras	0–0	0–0	1–0	0–0	2–1	0–0	3–0	0–0		0–3	1–1	3–1	0–0	1–0	2–0	0–0	2–1
Independiente (Ch)	1–1	3–0	1–0	0–0	1–1	2–0	2–1	0–0	0–1		0–0	0–1	0–0	2–1	2–0	3–1	1–1
Juventud Unida Universitario	1–1	2–2	1–0	0–2	1–0	1–1	1–1	1–0	2–1	2–0		0–0	3–1	1–1	0–0	0–0	1–1
Liniers (BB)	0–1	2–1	0–0	1–0	3–3	0–0	1–2	1–1	1–1	1–1	0–0		2–3	2–2	1–2	1–0	2–0
Olimpo	2–0	3–0	3–2	1–0	2–0	2–1	1–0	3–1	1–1	2–1	0–0	3–1		3–0	0–1	5–0	2–0
Sansinena	3–1	1–3	1–1	0–3	3–1	3–0	0–0	2–0	2–0	2–0	3–1	3–1	2–2		1–2	1–0	1–0
Sol de Mayo	1–1	3–0	2–0	0–1	2–0	4–1	1–0	1–1	3–1	0–0	0–1	4–1	1–1	0–4		1–0	0–0
Sportivo Peñarol	2–2	1–2	2–1	3–0	3–1	2–2	1–0	1–0	1–0	0–1	1–1	3–0	0–2	2–1	1–1		0–1
Villa Mitre	1–1	1–0	2–2	2–1	3–0	4–0	2–0	3–1	2–0	1–0	2–1	0–1	0–3	3–0	2–1	3–0	

Updated to match(es) played on October 16, 2022. Source: AFA
Legend: Blue = home team win; Yellow = draw; Red = away team win.

=== Zone B ===
Pos	Team	Pld	W	D	L	GF	GA	GD	Pts	Qualification or Relegation
1	Racing (C)	32	19	11	2	52	16	+36	68	Advance to Final Stages and qualification for Copa Argentina
2	Sarmiento (R)	32	18	10	4	44	19	+25	64	Advance to Final Stages and qualification for Copa Argentina
3	San Martín (F)	32	17	8	7	56	30	+26	59	Advance to Final Stages and qualification for Copa Argentina
4	Central Norte	32	15	12	5	44	25	+19	57	Advance to Final Stages and qualification for Copa Argentina
5	Gimnasia y Tiro	32	15	9	8	35	30	+5	54	Advance to Final Stages and qualification for Copa Argentina
6	Douglas Haig	32	13	9	10	42	32	+10	48 (Note: Douglas Haig ahead of Sportivo Belgrano on head-to-head points: Douglas Haig–Sportivo Belgrano 1–0, Sportivo Belgrano–Douglas Haig 0–0.)	Advance to Final Stages
7	Sportivo Belgrano	32	14	6	12	41	34	+7	48	Advance to Final Stages
8	Sportivo Las Parejas	32	12	10	10	33	33	0	46	Advance to Final Stages
9	Gimnasia y Esgrima (CdU)	32	13	5	14	33	39	−6	44	
10	Crucero del Norte	32	11	7	14	26	45	−19	40 (Note: Crucero del Norte ahead of Juventud Antoniana on head-to-head goals scored: Crucero del Norte–Juventud Antoniana 2–0, Juventud Antoniana–Crucero del Norte 2–1.)	
11	Juventud Antoniana	32	11	7	14	34	41	−7	40	
12	Boca Unidos	32	8	13	11	34	34	0	37	
13	Defensores (P)	32	7	10	15	27	40	−13	31	
14	Defensores de Belgrano (VR)	32	8	6	18	24	37	−13	30 (Note: Defensores de Belgrano (VR) ahead of Sportivo Belgrano on head-to-head points: Defensores de Belgrano (VR)–Unión (S) 0–0, Unión (S)–Defensores de Belgrano (VR) 1–2.)	
15	Unión (S)	32	8	6	18	30	48	−18	30	
16	Atlético Paraná (R)	32	6	8	18	25	48	−23	26	Relegated to Torneo Regional Federal Amateur
17	Juventud Unida (G) (R)	32	6	5	21	27	56	−29	23	Relegated to Torneo Regional Federal Amateur

Updated to match(es) played on October 16, 2022. Source: AFA
Rules for classification: 1) points; 2) Head-to-head points; 3) Head-to-head goal difference; 4) Head-to-head goals scored; 5) Head-to-head away goals; 6) goal difference; 7) goals scored; 8) away goals scored; 9) draw of lots.
(R) Relegated

==== Results ====
Home \ Away	APA	BOU	CNO	CRU	DPR	DEF	DOU	GYE	GYT	JUA	JUG	RAC	SAF	SAR	SPB	SLP	UNS
Atlético Paraná		0–0	0–1	4–0	2–3	0–1	1–0	1–2	0–0	1–3	2–0	2–2	0–1	0–4	0–1	1–2	2–1
Boca Unidos	0–0		3–3	5–0	0–0	4–1	1–0	0–0	0–2	1–0	4–0	1–1	1–1	1–3	2–3	0–0	2–0
Central Norte	0–1	3–1		2–0	1–0	2–0	1–1	3–1	0–0	1–0	4–1	0–1	3–3	2–0	1–1	3–1	3–2
Crucero del Norte	1–0	0–0	0–2		0–0	1–1	2–1	2–0	2–1	2–0	0–0	1–0	3–1	0–3	1–0	0–2	2–1
Defensores (P)	2–0	1–2	1–1	4–0		1–1	0–3	3–0	0–1	1–0	1–1	0–0	0–1	1–1	0–2	2–1	1–1
Defensores de Belgrano (VR)	4–1	0–1	0–0	1–2	1–0		0–1	3–1	0–1	2–3	1–0	0–1	1–2	0–1	0–2	0–0	0–0
Douglas Haig	1–2	1–1	2–2	2–0	2–0	1–0		2–0	4–0	1–0	3–2	0–0	1–1	0–0	1–0	1–2	3–1
Gimnasia y Esgrima (CdU)	4–1	1–0	0–0	1–0	4–1	1–0	0–3		0–0	1–1	2–0	0–2	0–2	0–1	3–0	2–1	1–0
Gimnasia y Tiro	2–0	2–0	2–1	1–0	1–0	2–0	4–3	3–0		2–0	2–0	1–1	0–2	0–1	0–3	0–1	2–1
Juventud Antoniana	1–1	2–1	1–0	2–1	1–2	0–0	1–1	1–0	1–1		1–0	0–4	2–1	0–3	3–1	5–0	1–2
Juventud Unida (G)	4–1	1–2	1–2	0–1	1–0	1–2	3–0	0–3	2–2	2–2		0–3	1–0	1–0	1–1	0–1	2–1
Racing (C)	2–0	2–0	1–0	4–1	1–0	2–1	3–0	1–0	1–1	2–1	4–1		4–1	1–1	2–1	2–1	4–0
San Martín (F)	1–1	3–0	0–0	1–1	2–0	1–0	1–1	3–0	4–0	4–0	2–0	0–0		1–0	4–2	4–2	2–0
Sarmiento (R)	0–0	0–0	1–1	1–1	2–2	3–1	2–1	0–0	2–0	2–1	2–1	1–0	3–2		2–0	1–1	2–0
Sportivo Belgrano	4–1	2–1	0–1	1–0	5–1	0–1	0–0	3–1	0–0	0–1	2–0	0–0	2–1	1–0		2–2	1–0
Sportivo Las Parejas	0–0	0–0	0–1	2–0	0–0	1–0	1–0	1–3	1–1	1–0	3–0	0–0	2–1	0–1	0–0		3–1
Unión (S)	1–0	2–1	0–0	2–2	2–0	1–2	1–2	1–2	0–0	1–0	2–1	1–1	0–3	0–1	3–1	2–1	

Updated to match(es) played on October 16, 2022. Source: AFA
Legend: Blue = home team win; Yellow = draw; Red = away team win.

== Final Stages ==
Teams ending in positions 1 to 8 will play the final stages for the second and last promotion berth to Primera Nacional, in which teams will be seeded in each round according to their final placement in the first stage of the tournament. In all rounds, the teams were seeded according to their performance and placements in the previous stage of the competition and paired against a rival according to their seed: Team 1 vs. Team 16, Team 2 vs. Team 15 and so on, playing a single match on local ground, except the final that will be played in neutral ground. In all rounds, in case of tie, penalties will decide the winner.

Pos	Grp	Team	Pld	W	D	L	GF	GA	GD	Pts
1	A	Olimpo	32	22	7	3	53	19	+34	73
2	B	Racing (C)	32	19	11	2	52	16	+36	68
3	B	Sarmiento (R)	32	18	10	4	44	19	+25	64
4	A	Villa Mitre	32	16	9	7	42	25	+17	57
5	B	San Martín (F)	32	17	8	7	56	30	+26	59
6	A	Ciudad de Bolivar	32	14	7	11	30	28	+2	49
7	B	Central Norte	32	15	12	5	44	25	+19	57
8	A	Independiente (Ch)	32	12	11	9	33	22	+11	47
9	B	Gimnasia y Tiro	32	15	9	8	35	30	+5	54
10	A	Sol de Mayo	32	12	10	10	32	26	+6	46
11	B	Douglas Haig	32	13	9	10	42	32	+10	48
12	A	Estudiantes (SL)	32	13	7	12	34	29	+5	46
13	B	Sportivo Belgrano	32	14	6	12	41	34	+7	48
14	A	Juventud Unida Universitario	32	10	15	7	28	25	+3	45
15	B	Sportivo Las Parejas	32	12	10	10	33	33	0	46
16	A	Sansinena	32	12	6	14	44	42	+2	42

Source: AFA
Rules for classification: 1) Points per game; 2) Performance in previous stage.

=== First knockout round ===
October 22, 2022	Olimpo	1–0	Sansinena	Bahía Blanca, Pcia. de Buenos Aires
18:30 UTC−3				Stadium: Roberto N. Carminatti; Referee: Pablo Núñez

October 23, 2022	Racing (C)	2–0	Sportivo Las Parejas	Córdoba, Pcia. de Córdoba
17:00 UTC−3				Stadium: Estadio Miguel Sancho; Referee: Mauricio Martín

October 23, 2022	Sarmiento (R)	1–0	Juventud Unida Universitario	Resistencia, Pcia. de Chaco
19:30 UTC−3				Stadium: Centenario; Referee: Jonathan Correa

October 23, 2022	Villa Mitre	4–0	Sportivo Belgrano	Bahía Blanca, Pcia. de Buenos Aires
16:00 UTC−3				Stadium: El Fortín; Referee: Adrián Franklin

October 23, 2022	San Martín (F)	1–1 (4–1 p)	Estudiantes (SL)	Formosa, Pcia. de Formosa
16:00 UTC−3				Stadium: 17 De Octubre; Referee: Jorge Sosa

October 23, 2022	Ciudad de Bolivar	2–0	Douglas Haig	San Carlos de Bolívar, Pcia. de Buenos Aires
15:00 UTC−3				Stadium: Municipal Eva Perón; Referee: Bruno Amiconi

October 23, 2022	Central Norte	2–0	Sol de Mayo	Salta, Pcia. de Salta
18:00 UTC−3				Stadium: Padre Ernesto Martearena; Referee: Nelson Bejas

October 23, 2022	Independiente (Ch)	1–1 (4–3 p)	Gimnasia y Tiro	Chivilcoy, Pcia. de Buenos Aires
16:00 UTC−3				Stadium: Raúl Orlando Lungarzo

=== Second knockout round ===
October 30, 2022	Olimpo	2–1	Independiente (Ch)	Bahía Blanca, Pcia. de Buenos Aires
16:00 UTC−3				Stadium: Roberto N. Carminatti; Referee: José Díaz

October 30, 2022	Racing (C)	1–0	Central Norte	Córdoba, Pcia. de Córdoba
17:00 UTC−3				Stadium: Estadio Miguel Sancho; Referee: Jorge Sosa

October 30, 2022	Sarmiento (R)	0–0 (5–4 p)	Ciudad de Bolivar	Resistencia, Pcia. de Chaco
19:30 UTC−3				Stadium: Centenario; Referee: Fernando Marcos

October 29, 2022	Villa Mitre	2–0	San Martín (F)	Bahía Blanca, Pcia. de Buenos Aires
16:00 UTC−3				Stadium: El Fortín; Referee: Bruno Amiconi

=== Third knockout round ===
November 6, 2022	Olimpo	0–0 (2–4 p)	Villa Mitre	Bahía Blanca, Pcia. de Buenos Aires
15:00 UTC−3				Stadium: Roberto N. Carminatti

November 6, 2022	Racing (C)	2–0	Sarmiento (R)	Córdoba, Pcia. de Córdoba
18:00 UTC−3				Stadium: Estadio Miguel Sancho

=== Fourth knockout round ===
November 13, 2022	Racing (C)	0–0 (5–4 p)	Villa Mitre	Villa Mercedes, Pcia. de San Luis
16:45 UTC−3				Stadium: Estadio Único; Referee: Nelson Bejas

== See also ==
- 2022 Copa de la Liga Profesional
- 2022 Argentine Primera División
- 2022 Primera Nacional
- 2022 Primera B Metropolitana
- 2021–22 Copa Argentina
