= 2021 Torneo Federal A =

IX Torneo Federal A
- Season: 2021
- Champions: Deportivo Madryn (1st divisional title)
- Promoted: Deportivo Madryn; Chaco For Ever
- Relegated: None
- Matches played: 454
- Goals scored: 1,001 (2.2 per match)
- Biggest home win: Chaco For Ever 5-0 Juventud Unida (G) (April 25)
- Biggest away win: Estudiantes (SL) 0-4 Juventud Unida Universitario (June 27)
- Highest scoring: Defensores de Belgrano (VR) 4-3 Douglas Haig (October 3)
- All statistics correct as of November 4, 2021.

The 2021 Argentine Torneo Federal A was the ninth season of the Torneo Federal A, the regionalised third tier of the Argentine football league system. The tournament is reserved for teams indirectly affiliated to the Asociación del Fútbol Argentino (AFA), while teams affiliated to AFA have to play the Primera B Metropolitana, which is the other third tier competition. The competition was contested by 27 of the 31 teams that took part in the 2020 season and four teams promoted from Torneo Regional Federal Amateur. Two teams will be promoted to Primera B Nacional and there was no relegation to Torneo Regional Federal Amateur. The season began on 11 April and ended in December 2021.

== Format ==
The 31 teams were split into two zones, one of 15 teams and another one of 16 teams, where they will play against the other teams in their group twice: once at home and once away, with one team in Zone B having a bye in each round for a total of 30 rounds. Both zone winners will play a final match on neutral ground to decide the first promoted team to the Primera B Nacional for the 2022 season, while the teams placed from second to eighth place in each zone will play a knockout tournament (Torneo Reducido) for the second promotion berth along with the loser of the final between the zone winners, which will join the Reducido in the Second knockout round. No teams will be relegated to Torneo Regional Federal Amateur this season.

== Club information ==
Locations of the 2021 season teams.
Yellow: Zone A; Blue: Zone B.

=== Zone A ===
Team	City	Stadium
Cipolletti	Cipolletti	La Visera de Cemento
Círculo Deportivo	Comandante Nicanor Otamendi	Guillermo Trama
Ciudad de Bolivar	San Carlos de Bolívar	Municipal Eva Perón
Deportivo Camioneros	General Rodríguez	Hugo Moyano
Deportivo Madryn	Puerto Madryn	Coliseo del Golfo
Desamparados	San Juan	El Serpentario
Estudiantes	San Luis	Héctor Odicino – Pedro Benoza
Ferro Carril Oeste	General Pico	El Coloso del Barrio Talleres
Huracán Las Heras	Las Heras	General San Martín
Independiente	Chivilcoy	Raúl Orlando Lungarzo
Juventud Unida Universitario	San Luis	Mario Diez
Olimpo	Bahía Blanca	Roberto Natalio Carminatti
Sansinena	General Cerri	Luis Molina
Sol de Mayo	Viedma	Sol de Mayo
Sportivo Peñarol	Chimbas	Ramón Pablo Rojas
Villa Mitre	Bahía Blanca	El Fortín

=== Zone B ===
Team	City	Stadium
Boca Unidos	Corrientes	José Antonio Romero Feris
Central Norte	Salta	Doctor Luis Güemes
Chaco For Ever	Resistencia	Juan Alberto García
Crucero del Norte	Garupá	Andrés Guacurarí
Defensores	Pronunciamiento	Delio Cardozo
Defensores de Belgrano	Villa Ramallo	Salomón Boeseldín
Douglas Haig	Pergamino	Miguel Morales
Gimnasia y Esgrima	Concepción del Uruguay	Manuel y Ramón Núñez
Gimnasia y Tiro	Salta	Gigante del Norte
Juventud Unida	Gualeguaychú	De los Eucaliptos
Racing	Córdoba	Miguel Sancho
Sarmiento	Resistencia	Centenario
Sportivo Belgrano	San Francisco	Oscar Boero
Sportivo Las Parejas	Las Parejas	Fortaleza del Lobo
Unión	Sunchales	La Fortaleza

=== Resignations ===
The following teams declined to participate in this season and will return in the next season.

Team	City	Stadium
San Martín	Formosa	17 De Octubre

== First stage ==
=== Zone A ===
Pos	Team	Pld	W	D	L	GF	GA	GD	Pts	Qualification
1	Deportivo Madryn	30	16	8	6	39	23	+16	56	Advance to Final and qualification for Copa Argentina
2	Sol de Mayo	30	13	11	6	32	24	+8	50	Advance to Second Promotion stage and qualification for Copa Argentina
3	Cipolletti	30	13	10	7	41	26	+15	49 (Note: Head-to-head: Cipolletti 7 points; Sportivo Peñarol 6 points; Olimpo 4 points.)	Advance to Second Promotion stage and qualification for Copa Argentina
4	Sportivo Peñarol	30	13	10	7	44	38	+6	49	Advance to Second Promotion stage and qualification for Copa Argentina
5	Olimpo	30	14	7	9	42	32	+10	49	Advance to Second Promotion stage and qualification for Copa Argentina
6	Independiente (Ch)	30	12	12	6	30	21	+9	48	Advance to Second Promotion
7	Juventud Unida Universitario	30	13	8	9	28	18	+10	47	Advance to Second Promotion
8	Villa Mitre	30	12	9	9	35	28	+7	45	Advance to Second Promotion
9	Desamparados	30	11	10	9	29	37	−8	43	
10	Ferro Carril Oeste (GP)	30	13	4	13	39	38	+1	43	
11	Sansinena	30	10	10	10	38	37	+1	40	
12	Ciudad de Bolivar	30	9	11	10	30	28	+2	38	
13	Huracán Las Heras	30	9	8	13	38	40	−2	35	
14	Deportivo Camioneros	30	7	8	15	25	34	−9	29	
15	Estudiantes (SL)	30	2	9	19	18	48	−30	15	
16	Círculo Deportivo	30	2	7	21	18	54	−36	13	

Source: AFA
Rules for classification: 1) points; 2) Head-to-head points; 3) Head-to-head goal difference; 4) Head-to-head goals scored; 5) Head-to-head away goals; 6) goal difference; 7) goals scored; 8) away goals scored; 9) draw of lots.

==== Results ====
Home \ Away	CIP	CDE	CBO	DEP	DMA	DES	ESL	FCO	HLH	ICH	JUU	OLI	SAN	SOL	SPP	VMI
Cipolletti		2–0	2–1	1–1	1–1	3–1	3–1	3–1	3–1	1–1	0–1	1–1	1–1	1–1	3–0	1–0
Círculo Deportivo	1–3		2–2	0–1	0–1	0–1	0–0	0–2	0–2	1–2	0–1	0–0	2–1	1–4	1–2	1–0
Ciudad de Bolivar	0–2	2–0		0–0	1–0	4–0	2–1	1–3	2–0	0–0	1–0	1–0	0–0	1–1	3–1	2–2
Deportivo Camioneros	1–0	2–0	0–3		2–2	2–2	0–0	2–1	3–1	1–2	0–1	1–1	0–0	2–0	0–3	0–1
Deportivo Madryn	0–0	1–0	1–0	3–2		2–1	3–1	3–1	2–0	1–3	1–0	2–1	1–0	1–1	1–1	3–0
Desamparados	2–0	0–0	2–1	0–0	2–1		2–2	1–0	0–0	1–0	0–4	2–2	1–0	0–0	3–3	1–0
Estudiantes (SL)	0–1	1–1	0–0	1–4	1–2	0–1		1–4	2–1	1–0	0–4	0–1	1–2	0–1	0–3	0–0
Ferro Carril Oeste (GP)	1–0	4–1	0–0	2–0	0–3	0–1	1–0		0–2	0–0	1–0	2–1	3–2	0–1	3–2	3–0
Huracán Las Heras	2–3	1–1	3–0	1–0	0–1	3–1	0–0	3–1		0–0	1–1	2–0	1–2	3–1	2–2	2–1
Independiente (Ch)	1–1	2–1	0–0	1–0	1–0	0–0	2–1	1–2	1–1		2–1	1–1	3–1	2–0	0–1	1–0
Juventud Unida Universitario	1–1	2–0	1–0	1–0	0–2	2–0	0–0	1–0	1–0	1–1		0–0	0–0	0–0	0–0	1–0
Olimpo	0–3	4–0	2–0	1–0	2–0	0–1	3–2	2–1	1–0	2–1	2–0		5–1	0–3	0–2	0–0
Sansinena	0–0	3–1	3–2	2–1	1–1	1–1	3–0	3–0	3–0	1–1	1–0	1–4		0–1	1–0	0–1
Sol de Mayo	2–0	4–2	0–0	1–0	0–0	3–2	1–1	1–1	1–0	0–0	2–1	0–2	1–0		2–1	0–0
Sportivo Peñarol	2–1	2–2	1–1	1–0	1–0	1–0	1–0	1–1	4–3	1–0	1–2	0–3	3–3	1–0		1–1
Villa Mitre	1–0	2–0	1–0	2–0	0–0	3–0	2–1	2–1	3–3	0–1	2–1	5–1	2–2	2–0	2–2	

Source: AFA
Legend: Blue = home team win; Yellow = draw; Red = away team win.

=== Zone B ===
Pos	Team	Pld	W	D	L	GF	GA	GD	Pts	Qualification
1	Racing (C)	28	16	9	3	43	16	+27	57	Advance to Final and qualification for Copa Argentina
2	Gimnasia y Tiro	28	15	10	3	36	20	+16	55	Advance to Second Promotion stage and qualification for Copa Argentina
3	Central Norte	28	12	13	3	40	22	+18	49	Advance to Second Promotion stage and qualification for Copa Argentina
4	Chaco For Ever	28	12	11	5	33	20	+13	47	Advance to Second Promotion stage and qualification for Copa Argentina
5	Sportivo Las Parejas	28	11	8	9	34	28	+6	41	Advance to Second Promotion stage and qualification for Copa Argentina
6	Defensores (P)	28	10	8	10	32	32	0	38 (Note: Defensores (P) ahead of Juventud Unida (G) on head-to-head goal difference: Defensores (P)–Juventud Unida (G) 3–0, Juventud Unida (G)–Defensores (P) 2–1.)	Advance to Second Promotion
7	Juventud Unida (G)	28	10	8	10	28	34	−6	38	Advance to Second Promotion
8	Defensores de Belgrano (VR)	28	10	7	11	36	40	−4	37	Advance to Second Promotion
9	Sarmiento (R)	28	9	9	10	38	41	−3	36	
10	Boca Unidos	28	7	12	9	38	36	+2	33	
11	Unión (S)	28	7	9	12	28	40	−12	30	
12	Douglas Haig	28	7	6	15	19	25	−6	27	
13	Sportivo Belgrano	28	5	11	12	25	35	−10	26 (Note: Sportivo Belgrano ahead of Gimnasia y Esgrima (CdU) on head-to-head points: Sportivo Belgrano–Gimnasia y Esgrima (CdU) 1–1, Gimnasia y Esgrima (CdU)–Sportivo Belgrano 1–2.)	
14	Gimnasia y Esgrima (CdU)	28	7	5	16	21	42	−21	26	
15	Crucero del Norte	28	4	10	14	19	39	−20	22	

Source: AFA
Rules for classification: 1) points; 2) Head-to-head points; 3) Head-to-head goal difference; 4) Head-to-head goals scored; 5) Head-to-head away goals; 6) goal difference; 7) goals scored; 8) away goals scored; 9) draw of lots.

==== Results ====
Home \ Away	BOU	CNO	CFE	CRU	DPR	DEF	DOU	GYE	GYT	JUG	RAC	SAR	SPB	SLP	UNS
Boca Unidos		2–3	1–1	2–2	1–2	1–2	1–0	1–0	1–3	3–0	2–1	1–1	1–1	1–1	5–1
Central Norte	2–2		2–0	4–1	2–0	1–0	0–0	4–0	1–1	2–1	0–0	3–0	1–1	1–0	3–2
Chaco For Ever	2–1	2–2		1–0	2–1	0–0	1–0	1–0	0–1	5–0	0–0	0–1	2–0	3–1	2–2
Crucero del Norte	1–1	0–0	0–0		0–0	1–1	0–0	3–0	2–1	1–0	1–2	1–0	0–0	0–2	0–2
Defensores (P)	0–0	0–0	0–2	1–1		3–2	2–1	1–0	0–0	3–0	1–0	1–2	2–2	2–1	2–2
Defensores de Belgrano (VR)	1–0	2–0	0–1	4–1	1–0		4–3	2–1	1–1	0–3	2–1	2–1	1–2	2–2	0–0
Douglas Haig	1–2	0–0	0–1	1–0	0–1	0–2		0–1	0–1	0–1	0–0	2–1	0–0	1–0	3–0
Gimnasia y Esgrima (CdU)	2–2	0–0	1–3	1–1	0–1	2–1	1–0		0–1	2–1	1–3	2–4	1–2	1–0	1–0
Gimnasia y Tiro	1–0	1–0	1–1	2–0	1–0	2–1	4–2	2–0		1–1	0–0	2–2	2–1	1–0	2–0
Juventud Unida (G)	1–1	3–3	0–0	1–0	2–1	1–1	0–2	4–2	1–0		0–0	1–1	1–0	1–0	0–0
Racing (C)	2–0	1–1	2–1	3–0	3–2	3–0	1–0	1–0	2–0	2–0		3–2	2–0	0–0	5–1
Sarmiento (R)	0–3	1–1	1–1	3–1	2–2	4–1	1–0	0–0	0–1	3–2	0–3		1–0	1–3	0–0
Sportivo Belgrano	2–0	0–2	1–1	3–1	1–2	2–2	0–1	1–1	1–1	0–2	1–1	0–2		2–2	0–2
Sportivo Las Parejas	1–1	2–1	2–0	3–1	2–1	3–1	0–2	0–1	1–1	1–0	0–0	2–2	1–0		2–0
Unión (S)	2–2	0–1	0–0	1–0	2–1	1–0	0–0	3–0	2–2	0–1	1–2	3–2	0–2	1–2	

Source: AFA
Legend: Blue = home team win; Yellow = draw; Red = away team win.

=== First Promotion Final ===
November 4, 2021
17:00 UTC−3

Deportivo Madryn	1–0	Racing (C)
Jeldres 62'

Julio H. Grondona, Sarandí
Referee: Adrián Franklin

Deportivo Madryn is promoted to Primera B Nacional.

== Second Promotion ==
=== First knockout round ===
The first knockout round will be contested by 14 teams: the teams ranked from 2nd to 8th place in their groups of the First stage. In this round, the teams will be seeded according to their performance and placements in the previous stage of the competition and paired against a rival according to their seed: Team 1 vs. Team 14, Team 2 vs. Team 13 and so on, playing a single match on local ground. The 7 winners will advance to the second knockout round.

November 7, 2021	Gimnasia y Tiro	2–1	Villa Mitre	Salta, Pcia. de Salta
16:15 UTC−3	Perrillo 11'; Bordon 59'		Laumann 74'	Stadium: Gigante del Norte; Referee: Nelson Bejas

November 7, 2021	Sol de Mayo	2–4	Defensores de Belgrano (VR)	Viedma, Pcia. de Río Negro
17:00 UTC−3	Galvan 79'; Silva 82'		Coronel 28', 38', 45+2'; Cervera 50'	Stadium: Sol de Mayo; Referee: Pablo Nuñez

November 7, 2021	Central Norte	1–0	Juventud Unida Universitario	Salta, Pcia. de Salta
18:00 UTC−3	Magno 75'			Stadium: Padre Ernesto Martearena; Referee: Guillermo González

November 7, 2021	Cipolletti	1–0	Juventud Unida (G)	Cipolletti, Pcia. de Río Negro
18:00 UTC−3	Taborda 67'			Stadium: La Visera de Cemento; Referee: Fernando Marcos

November 7, 2021	Chaco For Ever	2–1	Independiente (Ch)	Resistencia, Pcia. de Chaco
18:45 UTC−3	Ibarra 33' (pen.); Romero 35'		Bernal 78'	Stadium: Juan Alberto García; Referee: César Ceballos

November 7, 2021	Sportivo Peñarol	2–5	Defensores (P)	Chimbas, Pcia. de San Juan
16:30 UTC−3	Fernández 65'; Argumosa 86'		Rodríguez 16', 20'; Robles 46'; Guiffrey 73' (pen.); Gutiérrez 78'	Stadium: Ramón Pablo Rojas; Referee: José Díaz

November 7, 2021	Olimpo	3–1	Sportivo Las Parejas	Bahía Blanca, Pcia. de Buenos Aires
16:30 UTC−3	Capraro 20'; Olego 50'; Araujo 61'		Gutiérrez 9'	Stadium: Roberto N. Carminatti; Referee: Gastón Monzón

=== Second knockout round ===
The second knockout round will be contested by 8 teams: the 7 winning teams from First knockout round and the losing team from the First Promotion Final. In this round, the 8 teams will be seeded according to their performance and placements in the previous stage of the competition, and paired against a rival according to their seed: Team 1 vs. Team 8, Team 2 vs. Team 7 and so on, playing a single match on neutral ground. The 4 winners will advance to the third knockout round.

Pos	Grp	Team	Pld	W	D	L	GF	GA	GD	Pts	PPG	Qualification
1	A	Racing (C)	28	16	9	3	43	16	+27	57	2.04	Qualified from First Promotion Final
2	A	Gimnasia y Tiro	28	15	10	3	36	20	+16	55	1.96	Qualified from First Stage
3	A	Central Norte	28	12	13	3	40	22	+18	49 (Note: Central Norte ahead of Cipolletti on points average obtained in the Second Promotion stage.)	1.75	Qualified from First Stage
4	B	Cipolletti	30	13	10	7	41	26	+15	49	1.63	Qualified from First Stage
5	A	Chaco For Ever	28	12	11	5	33	20	+13	47	1.68	Qualified from First Stage
6	B	Olimpo	30	14	7	9	42	32	+10	49	1.63	Qualified from First Stage
7	A	Defensores (P)	28	10	8	10	32	32	0	38	1.36	Qualified from First Stage
8	A	Defensores de Belgrano (VR)	28	10	7	11	36	40	−4	37	1.32	Qualified from First Stage

Source: AFA
Rules for classification: 1) Points per game; 2) Performance in previous stage; 3) Points average; 4) Drawing of lots.
Notes:

November 21, 2021	Racing (C)	2–0	Defensores de Belgrano (VR)	Rafaela, Pcia. de Santa Fe
17:00 UTC−3	García 19'; Schiavoni 90+2'			Stadium: Nuevo Monumental; Referee: Fernando Marcos

November 21, 2021	Gimnasia y Tiro	3–2	Defensores (P)	Resistencia, Pcia. de Chaco
17:00 UTC−3	Herrera 41'; Busse 45+1' (pen.); Cháves 67'		Echague 34'; Meyer 83'	Stadium: Juan Alberto García; Referee: Guillermo González

November 21, 2021	Central Norte	0–0 (5–4 p)	Olimpo	Córdoba, Pcia. de Córdoba
17:00 UTC−3				Stadium: Presidente Perón; Referee: Bruno Amiconi

November 21, 2021	Cipolletti	0–0 (3–4 p)	Chaco For Ever	Río Cuarto, Pcia. de Córdoba
17:00 UTC−3				Stadium: Antonio Candini; Referee: Luis Lobo Medina

=== Third knockout round ===
The third knockout round will be contested by 4 teams: all the 4 winning teams from second knockout round. In this round, the 4 teams will be seeded according to their performance and placements in the previous stage of the competition, and paired against a rival according to their seed: Team 1 vs. Team 4, Team 2 vs. Team 3 and so on, playing a single match on neutral ground. The 2 winners will advance to the fourth knockout round.

Pos	Grp	Team	Pld	W	D	L	GF	GA	GD	Pts	Qualification
1	A	Racing (C)	28	16	9	3	43	16	+27	57	Qualified from First Promotion Final
2	A	Gimnasia y Tiro	28	15	10	3	36	20	+16	55	Qualified from First Stage
3	A	Central Norte	28	12	13	3	40	22	+18	49	Qualified from First Stage
4	A	Chaco For Ever	28	12	11	5	33	20	+13	47	Qualified from First Stage

Source: AFA
Rules for classification: 1) Points per game; 2) Performance in previous stage; 3) Points average; 4) Drawing of lots.

November 28, 2021	Racing (C)	1–1 (3–4 p)	Chaco For Ever	Santiago del Estero, Pcia. de Santiago del Estero
18:00 UTC−3	Jara 82'		Bruno 4'	Stadium: Doctores José y Antonio Castiglione; Referee: Nelson Bejas

November 28, 2021	Gimnasia y Tiro	2–1	Central Norte	Salta, Pcia. de Salta
18:00 UTC−3	Chaves 41'; Herrera 82'		Lesman 67'	Stadium: Padre Ernesto Martearena; Referee: César Ceballos

==== Fourth knockout round ====
The fourth knockout round will be contested by 2 teams: all the 2 winning teams from third knockout round. In this round, the 2 teams will be seeded according to their performance and placements in the previous stage of the competition, with teams coming from the First Promotion stage being given a higher seed, and paired against a rival according to their seed: Team 1 vs. Team 2, playing a single match on neutral ground. The winner will be promoted to Primera B Nacional.

Pos	Grp	Team	Pld	W	D	L	GF	GA	GD	Pts	Qualification
1	A	Gimnasia y Tiro	28	15	10	3	36	20	+16	55	Qualified from First Stage
2	A	Chaco For Ever	28	12	11	5	33	20	+13	47	Qualified from First Stage

Source: AFA
Rules for classification: 1) Points per game; 2) Performance in previous stage; 3) Points average; 4) Drawing of lots.

December 5, 2021	Gimnasia y Tiro	0–1	Chaco For Ever	Santiago del Estero, Pcia. de Santiago del Estero
18:00 UTC−3			Díaz 45+1' (pen.)	Stadium: Doctores José y Antonio Castiglione; Attendance: Gastón Monson

Chaco For Ever is promoted to Primera B Nacional.

== See also ==
- 2021 Copa de la Liga Profesional
- 2021 Argentine Primera División
- 2021 Primera Nacional
- 2021 Primera B Metropolitana
- 2019–20 Copa Argentina
