= Said Llambay =

Argentine footballer

Personal information
- Full name: Said Daniel Llambay
- Date of birth: 5 October 1994 (age 32)
- Place of birth: Stroeder, Argentina
- Height: 1.72 m (5 ft 7 1/2 in)
- Position: Midfielder

Team information
- Current team: Bischofshofen
- Number: 3

Youth career
- Málaga
- 2012–2015: Olimpo

Senior career*
Years	Team	Apps	(Gls)
2015–2021	Olimpo	40	(1)
2015	→ Sol de Mayo (loan)		
2020–2021	→ Bischofshofen (loan)	29	(3)
2022–	Bischofshofen	94	(4)
- * Club domestic league appearances and goals as of 27 June 2026

Said Daniel Llambay (born 5 October 1994) is an Argentine professional footballer who plays as a midfielder for SK Bischofshofen in Austria.

== Career ==
Llambay had a period in the youth of Spanish club Málaga, before joining Olimpo's ranks in 2012. Three years later, in 2015, he was loaned out to Torneo Federal B's Sol de Mayo. On 28 August 2016, Llambay made his professional career debut with Olimpo during a 1–0 Argentine Primera División defeat to Unión Santa Fe. He made a total of four appearances in 2016–17. His first senior goal arrived on 3 March 2019 against Santamarina, as he played twenty-three times for Olimpo in league and cup.

In January 2020, Llambay joined Austrian Regionalliga side SK Bischofshofen on loan. He featured in three friendlies in February, scoring once versus SV Lugstein Cabs Friedburg / Pöndorf, though wouldn't appear in the league due to the COVID-19 pandemic causing it to be cancelled. He would make his Regionalliga debut when the league started for 2020–21 in August, appearing for the full duration of a 1–0 loss to St. Johann.

== Career statistics ==
As of 18 August 2020.

Club statistics
Club	Season	League			Cup		League Cup		Continental		Other		Total	
Club	Season	Division	Apps	Goals	Apps	Goals	Apps	Goals	Apps	Goals	Apps	Goals	Apps	Goals
Olimpo	2015	Primera División	0	0	0	0	—		—		0	0	0	0
Olimpo	2016	Primera División	0	0	0	0	—		—		0	0	0	0
Olimpo	2016–17	Primera División	4	0	0	0	—		—		0	0	4	0
Olimpo	2017–18	Primera División	12	0	0	0	—		—		0	0	12	0
Olimpo	2018–19	Primera B Nacional	21	1	2	0	—		—		0	0	23	1
Olimpo	2019–20	Torneo Federal A	3	0	0	0	—		—		0	0	3	0
Olimpo	Total		40	1	2	0	—		—		0	0	42	1
SK Bischofshofen (loan)	2019–20	Regionalliga	0	0	0	0	—		—		0	0	0	0
SK Bischofshofen (loan)	2020–21	Regionalliga	2	0	0	0	—		—		0	0	2	0
SK Bischofshofen (loan)	Total		2	0	0	0	—		—		0	0	2	0
Career total			42	1	2	0	—		—		0	0	44	1
