= Matías Mayer =

Argentine footballer

Personal information
- Full name: Matías Alejandro Mayer
- Date of birth: 11 March 1996 (age 30)
- Place of birth: Neuquén, Argentina
- Height: 1.81 m (5 ft 11 1/2 in)
- Position: Forward

Team information
- Current team: Bella Vista

Youth career
- Pacífico
- San Martín SJ
- 2012–2015: Olimpo

Senior career*
Years	Team	Apps	(Gls)
2015–2020	Olimpo	7	(0)
2015	→ Bella Vista (loan)	1	(0)
2020–2021	Sansinena	7	(1)
2021–	Bella Vista		
- * Club domestic league appearances and goals as of 11:39, 20 May 2018 (UTC)

Matías Alejandro Mayer (born 11 March 1996) is an Argentine professional footballer who plays as a forward for Bella Vista .

== Career ==
Mayer spent time in the youth systems of Pacífico and San Martín, prior to joining Olimpo in 2012. In 2015, Mayer was loaned to Torneo Federal B side Bella Vista. He played one match for the club before returning to Olimpo. During the 2016–17 Argentine Primera División campaign, Mayer made his professional debut during a goalless draw with former club San Martín on 3 April 2017.

In October 2020, Mayer joined Sansinena. In 2021, Mayer returned to his former club, Bella Vista.

== Career statistics ==
As of 30 May 2018.

Club statistics
Club	Season	League			Cup (Note: Includes the Copa Argentina)		League Cup		Continental		Other		Total	
Club	Season	Division	Apps	Goals	Apps	Goals	Apps	Goals	Apps	Goals	Apps	Goals	Apps	Goals
Olimpo	2015	Primera División	0	0	0	0	—		—		0	0	0	0
Olimpo	2016	Primera División	0	0	0	0	—		—		0	0	0	0
Olimpo	2016–17	Primera División	4	0	0	0	—		—		0	0	4	0
Olimpo	2017–18	Primera División	0	0	0	0	—		—		0	0	0	0
Olimpo	Total		4	0	0	0	—		—		0	0	4	0
Bella Vista (loan)	2015	Torneo Federal B	1	0	0	0	—		—		0	0	1	0
Career total			5	0	0	0	—		—		0	0	5	0
