= Vaccaneo =

Vaccaneo is a surname. Notable people with the surname include:

- Alessandro Vaccaneo (1883–1945), Italian general
- Matías Vaccaneo (born 1995), Argentine professional footballer
