= Cristian Villanueva =

Argentine footballer (born 1983)

Personal information
- Full name: Cristian Damián Villanueva
- Date of birth: 25 December 1983 (age 42)
- Place of birth: General Roca, Argentina
- Height: 1.77 m (5 ft 9 1/2 in)
- Position: Defender

Youth career
- Deportivo Roca

Senior career*
Years	Team	Apps	(Gls)
2001–2008	Deportivo Roca	92	(3)
2008–2018	Olimpo	218	(3)
2018–2019	Sansinena	15	(0)
- * Club domestic league appearances and goals

Cristian Damián Villanueva (born 25 December 1983) is a retired Argentine professional footballer who played as a defender.

== Career ==
Villanueva began his career in 2001 with Deportivo Roca. He remained with the club for seven years in Torneo Argentino B, scoring three times in ninety-two matches between the 2001–02 and 2007–08 seasons. In July 2008, Villanueva joined Primera B Nacional side Olimpo. He made his professional debut against Aldosivi on 16 August, before scoring his first goal on 4 October versus Tiro Federal. In his first two seasons, he made fifty-three appearances as Olimpo won promotion to the Argentine Primera División in 2009–10. He netted his first top-flight goal in December 2010 v. Newell's Old Boys. He left in 2018, after ten years with Olimpo.

Villanueva subsequently signed for Sansinena of Torneo Federal A.

== Career statistics ==
As of 7 July 2020.

Club statistics
Club	Season	League			Cup		League Cup		Continental		Other		Total	
Club	Season	Division	Apps	Goals	Apps	Goals	Apps	Goals	Apps	Goals	Apps	Goals	Apps	Goals
Olimpo	2008–09	Primera B Nacional	27	1	0	0	—		—		0	0	27	1
Olimpo	2009–10	Primera B Nacional	26	0	0	0	—		—		0	0	26	0
Olimpo	2010–11	Primera División	13	1	0	0	—		—		0	0	13	1
Olimpo	2011–12	Primera División	25	0	2	0	—		—		0	0	27	0
Olimpo	2012–13	Primera B Nacional	32	1	1	0	—		—		0	0	33	1
Olimpo	2013–14	Primera División	29	0	0	0	—		—		0	0	29	0
Olimpo	2014	Primera División	16	0	1	0	—		—		0	0	17	0
Olimpo	2015	Primera División	12	0	0	0	—		—		1 (Note: Appearance(s) in the Primera División play-offs)	0	13	0
Olimpo	2016	Primera División	3	0	1	0	—		—		0	0	4	0
Olimpo	2016–17	Primera División	22	0	2	0	—		—		0	0	24	0
Olimpo	2017–18	Primera División	13	0	3	0	—		—		0	0	16	0
Olimpo	Total		218	3	10	0	—		—		1	0	229	3
Sansinena	2018–19	Torneo Federal A	15	0	1	0	—		—		0	0	16	0
Sansinena	2019–20	Torneo Federal A	0	0	0	0	—		—		0	0	0	0
Sansinena	Total		15	0	1	0	—		—		0	0	16	0
Career total			233	3	11	0	—		—		1	0	245	3

== Honours ==
Olimpo

- Primera B Nacional: 2009–10
