= Ezequiel Viola =

Argentine footballer

Personal information
- Full name: Ezequiel Héctor Viola
- Date of birth: 1 September 1987 (age 39)
- Place of birth: Bahía Blanca, Argentina
- Height: 1.86 m (6 ft 1 in)
- Position: Goalkeeper

Team information
- Current team: Sansinena

Senior career*
Years	Team	Apps	(Gls)
2008–2016	Olimpo	7	(0)
2013–2014	→ Juventud Antoniana (loan)	18	(0)
2016–2018	Gimnasia Mendoza	47	(0)
2018–2019	Olimpo	4	(0)
2019–	Sansinena	0	(0)
- * Club domestic league appearances and goals as of 17:44, 4 January 2020 (UTC)

Ezequiel Héctor Viola (born 1 September 1987) is an Argentine professional footballer who plays as a goalkeeper for Club Atlético Sansinena Social y Deportivo.

== Career ==
Olimpo gave Viola his start in professional football, selecting him in matches against All Boys and Los Andes during the 2008–09 Primera B Nacional. Olimpo won promotion to the Primera División in the following season, remaining for two seasons but he didn't feature in any games; though was on the substitutes bench fifteen times in 2011–12. On 3 June 2013, Viola was loaned to Torneo Argentino A's Juventud Antoniana. Eighteen appearances subsequently occurred. Viola returned to Olimpo in mid-2014 with the club back in tier one, going on to make his top-flight bow versus Sarmiento in September.

In July 2016, Viola joined Torneo Federal A side Gimnasia y Esgrima. He featured fifty-four times across two league campaigns, participating in twenty-one fixtures in 2017–18 as they were promoted to Primera B Nacional. Ahead of 2018–19, Viola rejoined Olimpo. His first match back was a home loss to Sarmiento on 26 August.

== Career statistics ==
As of 1 March 2019.

Appearances and goals by club, season and competition
Club	Season	League			Cup		Continental		Other		Total	
Club	Season	Division	Apps	Goals	Apps	Goals	Apps	Goals	Apps	Goals	Apps	Goals
Olimpo	2008–09	Primera B Nacional	2	0	0	0	—		0	0	2	0
Olimpo	2009–10	Primera B Nacional	0	0	0	0	—		0	0	0	0
Olimpo	2010–11	Primera División	0	0	0	0	—		0	0	0	0
Olimpo	2011–12	Primera División	0	0	0	0	—		0	0	0	0
Olimpo	2012–13	Primera B Nacional	0	0	0	0	—		0	0	0	0
Olimpo	2013–14	Primera División	0	0	0	0	—		0	0	0	0
Olimpo	2014	Primera División	0	0	0	0	—		0	0	0	0
Olimpo	2015	Primera División	5	0	0	0	—		0	0	5	0
Olimpo	2016	Primera División	0	0	0	0	—		0	0	0	0
Olimpo	Total		7	0	0	0	—		0	0	7	0
Juventud Antoniana (loan)	2013–14	Torneo Argentino A	18	0	0	0	—		0	0	18	0
Gimnasia y Esgrima	2016–17	Torneo Federal A	27	0	0	0	—		6 (Note: Appearance(s) in the Torneo Federal A play-offs)	0	33	0
Gimnasia y Esgrima	2017–18	Torneo Federal A	20	0	3	0	—		1	0	24	0
Gimnasia y Esgrima	Total		47	0	3	0	—		7	0	57	0
Olimpo	2018–19	Primera B Nacional	3	0	0	0	—		0	0	3	0
Career total			75	0	3	0	—		7	0	85	0
