= Ingeniero White =

- Town
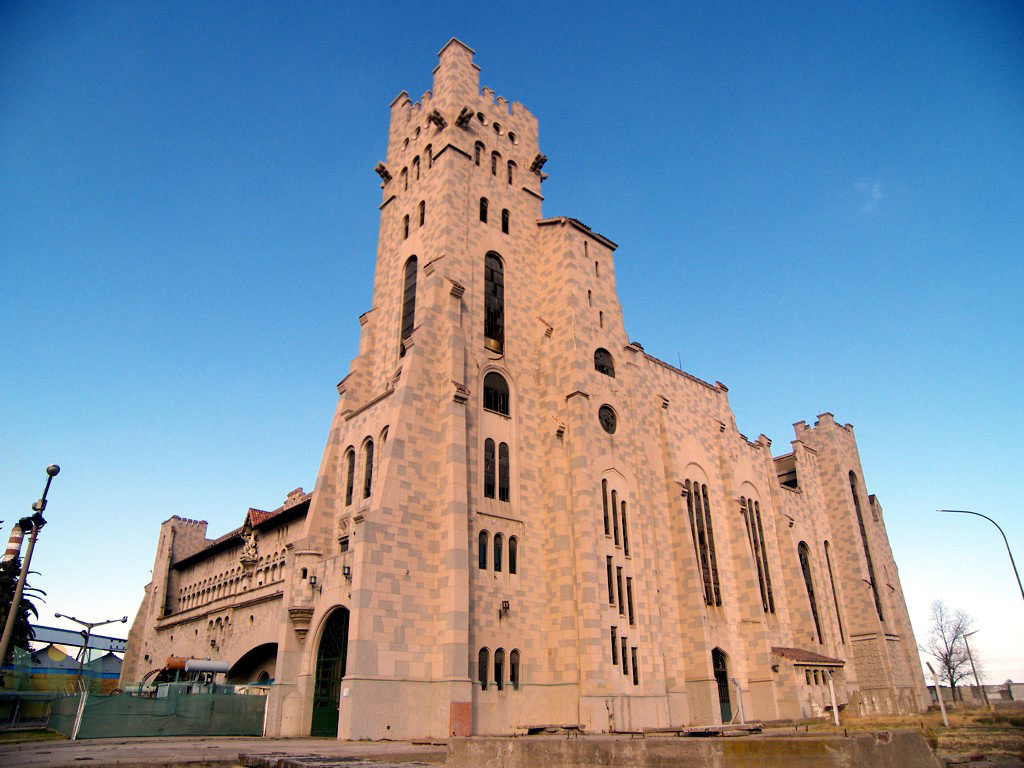
- El Castillo museum

- Location within Buenos Aires Province
- Coordinates: 38°46′S 62°16′W
- Country: Argentina
- Province: Buenos Aires
- Partidos: Bahía Blanca
- Elevation: 5 m (16 ft)

Population (2001 Census)
  - Total: 10,486
- Time zone: UTC−3 (ART)
- CPA Base: B 8013
- Area code: +291 457-XXXX
- Climate: Dfc

Ingeniero White is a town located in the Bahía Blanca Partido of Buenos Aires Province, Argentina.

== Etymology ==
The town was named after Don Guillermo White, who was one of the first engineers to graduate from the University of Buenos Aires. The name was given by decree of Julio Argentino Roca, then-president of Argentina.

== History ==
Ingeniero White is considered to have been founded on September 26, 1885, following the construction of the first pier in the region. A small port had been constructed several years earlier, owned at the time by the Ferrocarril del Sur. In 1899, the town was renamed to Ingeniero White. The port was often unable to accommodate the large numbers of supplies arriving, and was thus expanded in 1905.

The town expanded considerably in the late 20th century as it became a major port in the region. Today, Ingeniero White is the third-largest port in the country. A large plastic plant operated by Dow Argentina is also based in the town, employing roughly 580 people as of 2014.

Due to increased urbanization and the destruction of forests in the region, Ingeniero White has suffered from numerous large-scale floods.
