= Ezequiel Vidal (footballer, born 1995) =

Argentine footballer (born 1995)

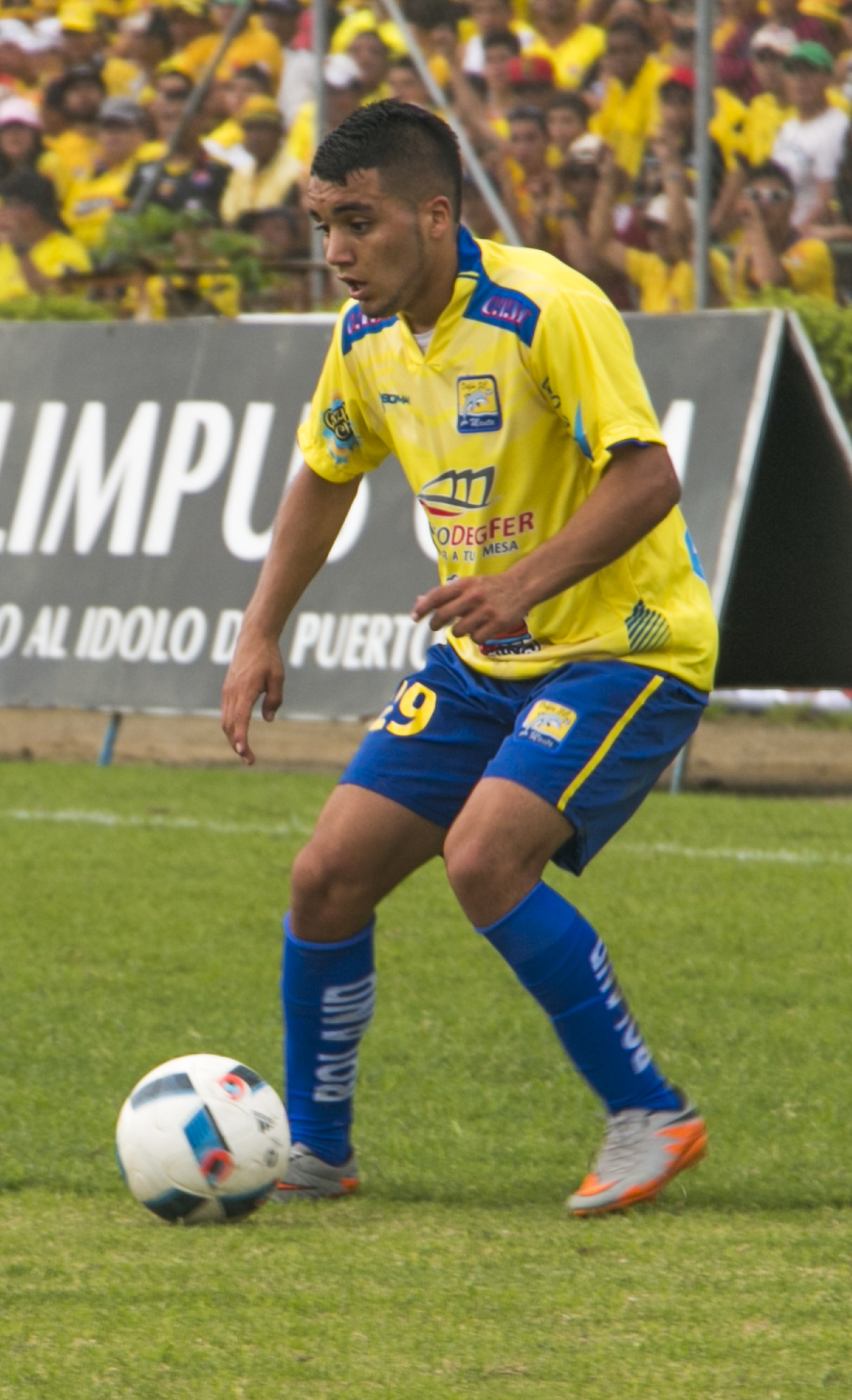
- Vidal playing for Delfín in 2016

Personal information
- Full name: Norberto Ezequiel Vidal
- Date of birth: 2 August 1995 (age 31)
- Place of birth: Bahía Blanca, Argentina
- Height: 1.68 m (5 ft 6 in)
- Positions: Attacking midfielder; winger

Team information
- Current team: PSIM Yogyakarta
- Number: 11

Youth career
- Olimpo

Senior career*
Years	Team	Apps	(Gls)
2011–2019	Olimpo	45	(3)
2015–2016	→ Independiente (loan)	6	(0)
2016	→ Delfín (loan)	20	(0)
2017	→ Juventud (loan)	12	(1)
2019–2020	San Martín SJ	7	(1)
2020–2021	Alvarado	37	(5)
2022	Independiente Rivadavia	13	(1)
2022–2024	Persita Tangerang	60	(17)
2024–2025	Punjab	22	(7)
2025–	PSIM Yogyakarta	33	(8)
- * Club domestic league appearances and goals as of 5 September 2026

Norberto Ezequiel Vidal (born 2 August 1995) is an Argentine professional footballer who plays as an attacking midfielder or winger for Super League club PSIM Yogyakarta.

== Career ==
Vidal started his Olimpo senior career in 2011, when he was an unused substitute for a Copa Argentina win against Central Norte on 30 November. He was also an unused sub once during the 2011–12 Argentine Primera División, prior to making his professional debut in 2013–14 in a win away to San Lorenzo on 4 August 2013. Two years later, after seven appearances for Olimpo, Vidal joined fellow Argentine Primera División team Independiente on loan. He subsequently made eight appearances over two seasons, including his Independiente debut versus Nueva Chicago on 19 September 2015.

He returned to Olimpo in July 2016 but was immediately loaned out again, to Ecuadorian Serie A side Delfín. Twenty appearances followed as Delfín finished ninth overall. Vidal then made six more appearances for Olimpo to end the 2016–17 season, before departing on loan in August 2017 to play for Juventud in the Uruguayan Primera División. He scored in his twelfth and final appearance for Juventud, in a 2–5 defeat at home to Montevideo Wanderers on 3 December. Juventud ended 2017 with relegation.

In August 2024, Vidal joined Indian Super League club Punjab.

== Personal life ==
Vidal is nicknamed La Pulga (The Flea) due to his height, speed and dribbling ability.

Vidal is of Chilean descent through his Chilean grandparents.

== Career statistics ==
As of 5 September 2026.

Club statistics
Club	Season	League			Cup (Note: Includes the Copa Argentina)		League Cup		Continental (Note: Includes the Copa Sudamericana)		Other		Total	
Club	Season	Division	Apps	Goals	Apps	Goals	Apps	Goals	Apps	Goals	Apps	Goals	Apps	Goals
Olimpo	2011–12	Argentine Primera División	0	0	0	0	—		—		0	0	0	0
Olimpo	2012–13	Primera B Nacional	0	0	0	0	—		—		0	0	0	0
Olimpo	2013–14	Argentine Primera División	1	0	0	0	—		—		0	0	1	0
Olimpo	2014	Argentine Primera División	5	0	0	0	—		—		0	0	5	0
Olimpo	2015	Argentine Primera División	0	0	0	0	—		—		0	0	0	0
Olimpo	2016	Argentine Primera División	0	0	0	0	—		—		0	0	0	0
Olimpo	2016–17	Argentine Primera División	6	0	0	0	—		—		0	0	6	0
Olimpo	2017–18	Argentine Primera División	11	0	0	0	—		—		0	0	11	0
Olimpo	Total		23	0	0	0	—		—		0	0	23	0
Independiente (loan)	2015	Argentine Primera División	5	0	0	0	—		2 (Note: Two appearances in 2015 Copa Sudamericana)	0	0	0	7	0
Independiente (loan)	2016	Argentine Primera División	1	0	0	0	—		0	0	0	0	1	0
Independiente (loan)	Total		6	0	0	0	—		2	0	0	0	8	0
Delfín (loan)	2016	Serie A	20	0	—		—		—		0	0	20	0
Juventud (loan)	2017	Uruguayan Primera División	12	1	—		—		—		0	0	12	1
San Martín SJ	2019–20	Primera Nacional	7	1	—		—		—		0	0	7	1
Alvarado	2020	Primera Nacional	7	2	1	0	—		—		0	0	8	2
Alvarado	2021	Primera Nacional	30	3	—		—		—		0	0	30	3
Independiente Rivadavia	2022	Primera Nacional	13	1	1	0	—		—		0	0	14	1
Persita Tangerang	2022–23	Liga 1	30	10	—		—		—		3 (Note: Three appearances in 2022 Indonesia President's Cup)	0	33	10
Persita Tangerang	2023–24	Liga 1	30	7	—		—		—		0	0	30	7
Persita Tangerang	Total		60	17	0	0	—		0	0	3	0	63	17
Punjab	2024–25	Indian Super League	22	7	0	0	0	0	—		0	0	22	7
PSIM Yogyakarta	2025–26	Super League	32	8	0	0	0	0	—		0	0	32	8
PSIM Yogyakarta	2026–27	Super League	1	0	0	0	–		0	0	0	0	1	0
Career total			233	40	2	0	—		2	0	3	0	240	40
