= Matías Vaccaneo =

Argentine professional footballer

Personal information
- Full name: Matías Federico Vaccaneo
- Date of birth: 12 June 1995 (age 31)
- Place of birth: Buenos Aires, Argentina
- Height: 1.90 m (6 ft 3 in)
- Position: Goalkeeper

Team information
- Current team: Sansinena

Youth career
- All Boys

Senior career*
Years	Team	Apps	(Gls)
2017–2019	All Boys	2	(0)
2020	CA San Jorge	3	(0)
2020–	Sansinena	0	(0)
- * Club domestic league appearances and goals as of 23:00, 23 October 2020 (UTC)

Matías Federico Vaccaneo (born 12 June 1995) is an Argentine professional footballer who plays as a goalkeeper for Sansinena.

== Career ==
Vaccaneo's career began with All Boys, notably appearing for their youth at the 2013 Torneo di Viareggio. He was an unused substitute eighteen times across the 2016–17 and 2017–18 seasons, eventually making his professional deal on the eighteenth occasion after Mariano Ferrero selected him off the substitutes bench in a Primera B Nacional fixture with Atlético de Rafaela on 9 March 2018. His first start arrived nine days later against Boca Unidos, featuring for the full duration of a home defeat as the club went on to suffer relegation to Primera B Metropolitana. Vaccaneo departed to CA San Jorge in 2020, subsequently featuring three times.

In October 2020, Vaccaneo moved up a division to Torneo Federal A after joining Sansinena.

== Career statistics ==
As of 23 October 2020.

Appearances and goals by club, season and competition
Club	Season	League			Cup		League Cup		Continental		Other		Total	
Club	Season	Division	Apps	Goals	Apps	Goals	Apps	Goals	Apps	Goals	Apps	Goals	Apps	Goals
All Boys	2016–17	Primera B Nacional	0	0	0	0	—		—		0	0	0	0
All Boys	2017–18	Primera B Nacional	2	0	0	0	—		—		0	0	2	0
All Boys	2018–19	Primera B Metropolitana	0	0	0	0	—		—		0	0	0	0
All Boys	2019–20	Primera B Nacional	0	0	0	0	—		—		0	0	0	0
All Boys	Total		2	0	0	0	—		—		0	0	2	0
CA San Jorge	2020	Torneo Amateur	3	0	0	0	—		—		0	0	3	0
Sansinena	2020–21	Torneo Federal A	0	0	0	0	—		—		0	0	0	0
Career total			5	0	0	0	—		—		0	0	5	0
