= Nicolás Herranz =

Argentine footballer

Personal information
- Full name: Nicolás José Herranz
- Date of birth: 17 June 1994 (age 32)
- Place of birth: Casilda, Argentina
- Height: 1.83 m (6 ft 0 in)
- Position: Centre back

Team information
- Current team: Guillermo Brown

Youth career
- Rosario Central

Senior career*
| Years | Team | Apps | (Gls) |
| 2016–2018 | Olimpo | 10 | (0) |
| 2018 | Vardar | 4 | (0) |
| 2019–2020 | San Martín SJ | 0 | (0) |
| 2020– | Guillermo Brown | 35 | (0) |
- * Club domestic league appearances and goals as of 20:06, 24 July 2022 (UTC)

Nicolás José Herranz (born 17 June 1994) is an Argentine professional footballer who plays as a centre back for Guillermo Brown.

== Career ==
Herranz spent time in the youth system of Rosario Central, prior to joining Olimpo in 2016. He was an unused substitute for Olimpo's final fixture of 2016 against Sarmiento on 21 May. In April 2017, Herranz made his professional debut versus Patronato, playing the full ninety minutes in a 3–4 victory. Following Olimpo's relegation in 2017–18, Herranz left to join Macedonian First Football League side Vardar on 5 July 2018. He left the club at the end of 2018.

== Career statistics ==
As of 2 December 2018.

Club statistics
| Club | Season | League | | | Cup (Note: Includes the Copa Argentina) | | League Cup | | Continental (Note: Includes the UEFA Europa League) | | Other | | Total | |
| Club | Season | Division | Apps | Goals | Apps | Goals | Apps | Goals | Apps | Goals | Apps | Goals | Apps | Goals |
|---|---|---|---|---|---|---|---|---|---|---|---|---|---|---|
| Olimpo | 2016 | Primera División | 0 | 0 | 0 | 0 | — | | — | | 0 | 0 | 0 | 0 |
| Olimpo | 2016–17 | Primera División | 1 | 0 | 0 | 0 | — | | — | | 0 | 0 | 1 | 0 |
| Olimpo | 2017–18 | Primera División | 9 | 0 | 1 | 0 | — | | — | | 0 | 0 | 10 | 0 |
| Olimpo | Total | | 10 | 0 | 1 | 0 | — | | — | | 0 | 0 | 11 | 0 |
| Vardar | 2018–19 | First League | 4 | 0 | 0 | 0 | — | | 0 | 0 | 0 | 0 | 4 | 0 |
| Career total | | | 14 | 0 | 1 | 0 | — | | 0 | 0 | 0 | 0 | 15 | 0 |
