= Cabildo, Buenos Aires =

Cabildo
- Town
- Location within Buenos Aires Province
- Coordinates: 38°29′S 61°54′W
- Country: Argentina
- Province: Buenos Aires
- Partidos: Bahía Blanca
- Established: 1903
- Elevation: 5 m (16 ft)

Population (2001 Census)
  - Total: 2,125
- Time zone: UTC−3 (ART)
- CPA Base: B 8013
- Area code: +291 457-XXXX
- Climate: Dfc

Cabildo is a town located in the northeastern edge of the Bahia Blanca Partido in the state of Buenos Aires, Argentina. In 2001 the town had a population of 2,125 people.

== Geography ==
Cabildo is located 51 km (32 mi) from the capital city of Bahia Blanca. The town is located just south of the Sierra de la Ventana mountain range.

== History ==
Cabildo was founded following the construction of a railway station connecting the community in 1903. Alongside this, the town functioned primarily as an agricultural center, due to the soil in the region being suitable for grazing. In 1943, the building which today houses the town's municipal delegation was completed.
