= Michael Covea =

Venezuelan footballer (born 1993)

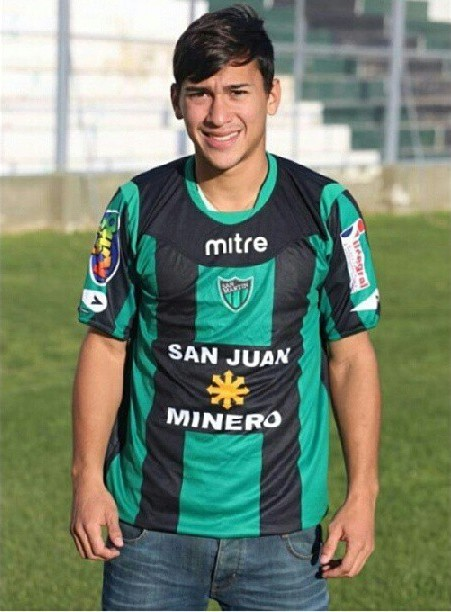
- Covea in 2013

Personal information
- Full name: Michael O'Neal Covea Uzcátegui
- Date of birth: 21 August 1993 (age 33)
- Place of birth: Caracas, Venezuela
- Height: 1.77 m (5 ft 10 in)
- Position: Midfielder

Team information
- Current team: Caracas
- Number: 8

Senior career*
Years	Team	Apps	(Gls)
2011–2013	Deportivo Petare	42	(5)
2013–2016	San Martín de San Juan	24	(0)
2017	Deportivo La Guaira	7	(0)
2017–2018	Club Olimpo	8	(0)
2018–2021	Mineros de Guayana	43	(5)
2021	Deportivo Táchira	10	(5)
2021–2022	Rosario Central	21	(0)
2023	Carabobo F.C.	24	(4)
2024	Academia Puerto Cabello	14	(1)
2024	Real Cartagena	14	(0)
2025-	Caracas	12	(2)
- * Club domestic league appearances and goals as of 18 April 2025

Michael O'Neal Covea Uzcátegui (born 21 August 1993 in Caracas, Venezuela) is a Venezuelan professional footballer who plays as a midfielder for club Caracas.

== Teams ==
- Deportivo Petare 2011–2013
- San Martín de San Juan 2013–2016
- Deportivo La Guaira 2017
- Club Olimpo 2017–2018
- Mineros de Guayana 2018–2021
- Deportivo Tachira 2021
- Rosario Central 2021–2022
- Carabobo F.C. 2023–
