= Maximiliano Fornari =

Argentine footballer

Personal information
- Date of birth: 15 May 1995 (age 31)
- Place of birth: Salto, Argentina
- Height: 1.80 m (5 ft 11 in)
- Position: Left winger

Team information
- Current team: Cipolletti

Youth career
- Sarmiento

Senior career*
| Years | Team | Apps | (Gls) |
| 2013–2021 | Sarmiento | 42 | (4) |
| 2017 | → Ferro Carril | 11 | (0) |
| 2017–2018 | → Olimpo (loan) | 16 | (0) |
| 2018–2019 | → Los Andes (loan) | 8 | (2) |
| 2020 | → Mushuc Runa (loan) | 0 | (0) |
| 2021 | Güemes | 1 | (0) |
| 2021 | Apollon Larissa | 0 | (0) |
| 2022– | Cipolletti | 4 | (1) |
- * Club domestic league appearances and goals as of 20:49, 2 May 2022 (UTC)

Maximiliano Fornari (born 15 May 1995) is an Argentine professional footballer who plays as a midfielder for Club Cipolletti.
