= Ramón Lentini =

Argentine footballer

Personal information
- Full name: Ramón Lentini
- Date of birth: October 24, 1988 (age 38)
- Place of birth: Posadas, Argentina
- Height: 1.85 m (6 ft 1 in)
- Position: Forward

Team information
- Current team: Güemes

Youth career
- 2003–2008: Estudiantes

Senior career*
Years	Team	Apps	(Gls)
2008–2011	Estudiantes	6	(1)
2009–2010	→ Quilmes (loan)	18	(6)
2010–2011	→ Instituto (loan)	15	(1)
2011–2012	Aldosivi	12	(1)
2012–2014	Chacarita Juniors	57	(28)
2014–2015	Unión Española	6	(0)
2015	Nueva Chicago	14	(2)
2016–2017	San Martín Tucumán	57	(29)
2017–2018	Olimpo	7	(0)
2018	Chacarita Juniors	11	(3)
2019	San Luis	15	(5)
2020–2021	Gimnasia Mendoza	39	(10)
2022–	Güemes	14	(1)
- * Club domestic league appearances and goals as of 19:58, 7 August 2022 (UTC)

Ramón Lentini (born 24 October 1988 in Posadas) is an Argentine football striker who plays for Güemes.

== Career ==
A southpaw, Lentini was a staple of the Estudiantes de La Plata youth system since 2003, achieving renown as a scorer: he has a hundred goals to his name in the youth and reserve teams. Lentini signed his first professional contract at the age of 19, and made his debut with the squad on 7 December 2008 in a game against Colón de Santa Fe. Three days later, in his second game, a 2–1 defeat to Godoy Cruz, he scored his first goal. His second goal for Estudiantes was a crucial header against Peruvian side Sporting Cristal that cemented Estudiantes' entry into the group stage of 2009 Copa Libertadores.

With the arrival of coach Alejandro Sabella, Lentini had fewer opportunities and was loaned to Quilmes together with fellow scorer prospect Mauricio Carrasco for the 2009–10 season. His first goal for Quilmes was on September 25, 2009, against San Martín de San Juan. Lentini was part of the Quilmes squad that obtained promotion to the Argentine Primera División. He returned to Estudiantes at the end of the season and was again loaned to a second division side, Instituto de Córdoba.

== Honours ==
Estudiantes de La Plata

- Copa Libertadores: 2009
