= Jonathan Blanco =

Argentine footballer

Personal information
- Full name: Jonathan Matías Blanco
- Date of birth: April 29, 1987 (age 39)
- Place of birth: José C. Paz, Argentina
- Height: 1.84 m (6 ft 0 in)
- Position: Defensive midfielder

Team information
- Current team: Barracas Central
- Number: 18

Youth career
- Tigre

Senior career*
Years	Team	Apps	(Gls)
2008–2012	Tigre	51	(2)
2011–2012	→ Aldosivi (loan)	34	(1)
2012–2017	Olimpo	134	(12)
2018–2021	Agropecuario	57	(3)
2021	All Boys	29	(2)
2022–	Barracas Central	3	(0)
- * Club domestic league appearances and goals as of 19:59, 24 March 2022 (UTC)

Jonathan Matías Blanco (born 29 April 1987, in José C. Paz, Buenos Aires) is an Argentine football player who plays as a defensive midfielder for Barracas Central.

He made his debut on June 22, 2008, for Tigre.
