= Joel Sacks =

Argentine footballer

Personal information
- Full name: Joel Sacks
- Date of birth: 10 April 1989 (age 37)
- Place of birth: Rafaela, Santa Fe, Argentina
- Height: 1.70 m (5 ft 7 in)
- Position: Right back

Team information
- Current team: Libertad

Youth career
- Atlético de Rafaela

Senior career*
Years	Team	Apps	(Gls)
2008–2016	Atlético de Rafaela	86	(2)
2016–2017	Olimpo	12	(0)
2017–2018	Mitre	12	(0)
2019–	Libertad	9	(0)
- * Club domestic league appearances and goals as of 27 March 2019

Joel Sacks (born 10 April 1989) is an Argentine football defender who currently plays for Libertad of the Torneo Federal A.

== Honours ==
Atlético de Rafaela

- Primera B Nacional: 2010–11
