= Bahía Blanca Partido =

Administrative region in Buenos Aires, Argentina

Bahia Blanca Partido de Bahia Blanca
- Department
- Flag Coat of arms

- Location of Bahia Blanca Partido within Buenos Aires Province
- Coordinates: 38°42′S 62°16′W
- Country: Argentina
- Province: Buenos Aires
- Established: April 11, 1828
- Founder: Colonel Ramón Bernabé Estomba
- Seat: Bahía Blanca

Government
  - Intendant: Federico Susbieles (UP)

Area
  - Total: 2,300 km^{2} (890 sq mi)

Population
  - Total: 336,674
  - Density: 150/km^{2} (380/sq mi)
- Demonym: bahiense
- Postal Code: B8000
- IFAM: BUE008
- Area Code: 0291
- Patron saint: Merced Virgen
- Website: www.bahia.gob.ar

The Partido de Bahía Blanca is a partido of the Buenos Aires Province is located at the south-west of the province in central Argentina at coordinates 38°42′S 62°16′W.

The provincial subdivision holds a population of 336,674 inhabitants in an area of 2,300 km^{2} (888 sq mi), and its capital city is Bahía Blanca, on the shore of the Atlantic Ocean.

== Sports ==
The city of Bahía Blanca has a strong sporting tradition. It is home to two football clubs, Olimpo de Bahía Blanca and Club Villa Mitre (second division).

The city is also well known for its basketball club Estudiantes which is on the Liga Nacional de Basquetbol.

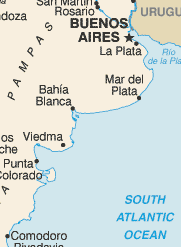
Central atlantic part of Argentina.

== Administrative divisions ==
Bahía Blanca Partido is subdivided into eleven divisions known as localidades:

- Bahía Blanca 301,531 inhabitants
- General Daniel Cerri 8,716 inhabitants
- Cabildo 2,125 inhabitants
- Grünbein 3,194 inhabitants
- Ingeniero White 10,486 inhabitants
- Villa Bordeu 982 inhabitants
- Villa Espora - Base Aeronaval Comandante Espora 1,604 inhabitants
- Villa Harding Green
- Villa Stella Maris
- Villa Nueva
- Rosendo López 5,000 inhabitants

=== Settlements ===
The main towns in Bahia Blanca Partido are, including its population according to the 2001 census [INDEC]:

- Bahía Blanca, 258,243
- Grünbein, 3,194
- Ingeniero White, 10,486
- Villa Bordeau 982
- Villa Espora - Base Aeronaval
  Comandante Espora, 1,604
- Cabildo, 2,125
- General Cerri, 6,515
- Villa Harding Green
- Villa Stella Maris
- Álferez San Martín
- Corti
- Napostá
- La Viticola
- Rural area, 1,627
- Villa Italia [?]
