= Luis Vila =

Argentine footballer

Personal information
- Full name: Luis Alfredo Vila Sepúlveda
- Date of birth: 6 March 1992 (age 34)
- Place of birth: Tornquist, Buenos Aires, Argentina
- Height: 1.78 m (5 ft 10 in)
- Position: Forward

Team information
- Current team: Gimnasia CdU

Youth career
- Automoto Club
- 2007–2013: River Plate

Senior career*
Years	Team	Apps	(Gls)
2011–2014	River Plate	0	(0)
2013	→ Everton (loan)	9	(2)
2014	→ Olmedo (loan)	13	(2)
2015	Godoy Cruz	3	(0)
2016–2017	Gimnasia de Jujuy	43	(15)
2017–2018	Olimpo	15	(2)
2018	Istra 1961	6	(0)
2019	Delfín	10	(0)
2019	Guayaquil City	4	(0)
2020	Almagro	4	(0)
2020	Atlético Porteño	10	(0)
2021	Santamarina	23	(1)
2022–2024	Olimpo	85	(18)
2025	Civitanovese	11	(2)
2025	Real Oruro	9	(3)
2026	Automoto Club	–	(–)
2026–	Gimnasia CdU	0	(0)
- * Club domestic league appearances and goals as of 9 July 2025

Luis Alfredo Vila Sepulveda (born 6 March 1992) is an Argentine footballer who plays for Gimnasia y Esgrima de Concepción del Uruguay.

== Career ==
Vila left Olimpo at the end of the 2024 season. The next year, he moved to Italy and joined Serie D club Civitanovese. In the second half of 2025, he returned to South America and joined Bolivian club Real Oruro.

In July 2026, Vila joined Gimnasia y Esgrima de Concepción del Uruguay from Automoto Club.

=== Teams ===
- River Plate 2011–2013
- Everton 2013–present

== Personal life ==
Vila is of Chilean descent from both his paternal grandmother and his maternal grandfather.

== Titles ==
- River Plate 2012 (Copa Libertadores U-20)
