= 2020–21 Austrian Regionalliga =

Austrian Regionalliga
- Season: 2020–21

The 2020–21 Austrian Regionalliga was the 62nd season of the Austrian third-tier football league.

The Regionalliga is split into five sections, (Tirol, Vorarlberg, Salzburg, Mitte and Ost).

The season was abandoned midway through due to the COVID-19 global pandemic, therefore no promotions or relegations took place.

== Regular season ==
=== Tirol ===
Pos	Team	Pld	W	D	L	GF	GA	GD	Pts
1	Kitzbühel	16	10	3	3	34	13	+21	33
2	Wörgl	15	10	1	4	36	27	+9	31
3	Imst	15	9	2	4	39	21	+18	29
4	Kufstein	15	7	5	3	30	19	+11	26
5	SVG Reichenau	15	7	3	5	25	17	+8	24
6	Wacker Innsbruck II	14	6	4	4	30	21	+9	22
7	Schwaz	14	5	3	6	25	28	−3	18
8	Swarovski Tirol II	16	5	1	10	29	50	−21	16
9	Telfs	17	3	6	8	27	35	−8	15
10	Hall	15	0	0	15	12	56	−44	0

Updated to match(es) played on 31 Oct 2020. Source: Soccerway
Rules for classification: 1) Points; 2) Less matches awarded against; 3) Goal difference; 4) Goals scored; 5) Matches won; 6) Away matches won; 7) Head-to-head points; 8) Head-to-head goal difference; 9) Head-to-head goals scored

=== Vorarlberg ===
Pos	Team	Pld	W	D	L	GF	GA	GD	Pts
1	Lauterach	8	6	0	2	19	12	+7	18
2	Hohenems	7	5	2	0	23	9	+14	17
3	Schwarz-Weiß Bregenz	8	4	2	2	21	17	+4	14
4	Dornbirner SV	8	3	3	2	18	14	+4	12
5	Austria Lustenau II	7	4	0	3	14	16	−2	12
6	Wolfurt	7	3	0	4	16	13	+3	9
7	Rot-Weiß Rankweil	8	2	0	6	12	29	−17	6
8	Rotenberg	8	1	2	5	12	18	−6	5
9	Röthis	7	0	3	4	9	16	−7	3

Updated to match(es) played on 23 Sept 2020. Source: Soccerway
Rules for classification: 1) Points; 2) Less matches awarded against; 3) Goal difference; 4) Goals scored; 5) Matches won; 6) Away matches won; 7) Head-to-head points; 8) Head-to-head goal difference; 9) Head-to-head goals scored

=== Salzburg ===
Pos	Team	Pld	W	D	L	GF	GA	GD	Pts
1	SV Kuchl	12	9	1	2	29	13	+16	28
2	Austria Salzburg	14	9	1	4	21	15	+6	28
3	SV Seekirchen 1945	14	7	2	5	24	23	+1	23
4	SK Bischofshofen	13	6	4	3	17	11	+6	22
5	SV Grödig	13	6	0	7	23	24	−1	18
6	USK Anif	14	4	5	5	20	16	+4	17
7	Pinzgau Saalfelden	13	5	1	7	18	19	−1	16
8	TSV St. Johann	14	3	5	6	17	22	−5	14
9	SAK 1914	12	3	3	6	15	26	−11	12
10	SV Wals-Grünau	13	2	2	9	15	30	−15	8

Updated to match(es) played on 6 October 2020. Source: Soccerway
Rules for classification: 1) Points; 2) Less matches awarded against; 3) Goal difference; 4) Goals scored; 5) Matches won; 6) Away matches won; 7) Head-to-head points; 8) Head-to-head goal difference; 9) Head-to-head goals scored

=== Mitte ===
Pos	Team	Pld	W	D	L	GF	GA	GD	Pts
1	Gleisdorf	13	8	3	2	26	17	+9	27
2	St. Anna	12	8	2	2	33	15	+18	26
3	Union Raiffeisen Gurten	13	7	5	1	22	13	+9	26
4	Hertha Wels	13	8	1	4	34	20	+14	25
5	Bad Gleichenberg	12	7	2	3	28	18	+10	23
6	Sturm Graz II	13	7	2	4	23	17	+6	23
7	Kalsdorf	13	7	1	5	20	19	+1	22
8	Wolfsberger AC II	13	5	3	5	21	18	+3	18
9	ELIN Weiz	13	5	1	7	24	20	+4	16
10	Deutschlandsberg	15	3	9	3	29	27	+2	18
11	Allerheiligen	11	4	1	6	26	24	+2	13
12	Ried II	12	3	3	6	20	28	−8	12
13	Stadl-Paura	13	3	2	8	20	32	−12	11
14	Spittal	12	2	3	7	10	25	−15	9
15	Vöcklamarkt	13	2	2	9	11	28	−17	8
16	Wels	13	1	4	8	14	40	−26	7

Updated to match(es) played on 30 October 2020. Source: Soccerway
Rules for classification: 1) Points; 2) Less matches awarded against; 3) Goal difference; 4) Goals scored; 5) Matches won; 6) Away matches won; 7) Head-to-head points; 8) Head-to-head goal difference; 9) Head-to-head goals scored

=== Ost ===
Pos	Team	Pld	W	D	L	GF	GA	GD	Pts
1	Wiener SK	8	6	1	1	13	4	+9	19
2	Bruck/Leitha	9	6	0	3	24	11	+13	18
3	Leobendorf	7	6	0	1	16	9	+7	18
4	Traiskirchen	9	5	1	3	20	9	+11	16
5	Team Wiener Linien	8	5	0	3	14	7	+7	15
6	Stripfing/Angern	6	5	0	1	10	4	+6	15
7	Mannsdorf	8	3	2	3	13	12	+1	11
8	Admira Juniors	7	3	2	2	10	9	+1	11
9	Wiener Viktoria	10	2	1	7	8	21	−13	7
10	Mauerwerk	8	2	0	6	7	18	−11	6
11	Neusiedl	8	2	0	6	6	17	−11	6
12	Draßburg	9	1	2	6	12	22	−10	5
13	Wiener Neustadt	7	1	1	5	2	12	−10	4

Updated to match(es) played on 24 October 2020. Source: Soccerway
Rules for classification: 1) Points; 2) Less matches awarded against; 3) Goal difference; 4) Goals scored; 5) Matches won; 6) Away matches won; 7) Head-to-head points; 8) Head-to-head goal difference; 9) Head-to-head goals scored

== See also ==
- 2020–21 Austrian Football Bundesliga
- 2020–21 Austrian Football Second League
- 2020–21 Austrian Cup
