= Chimbas =

- City
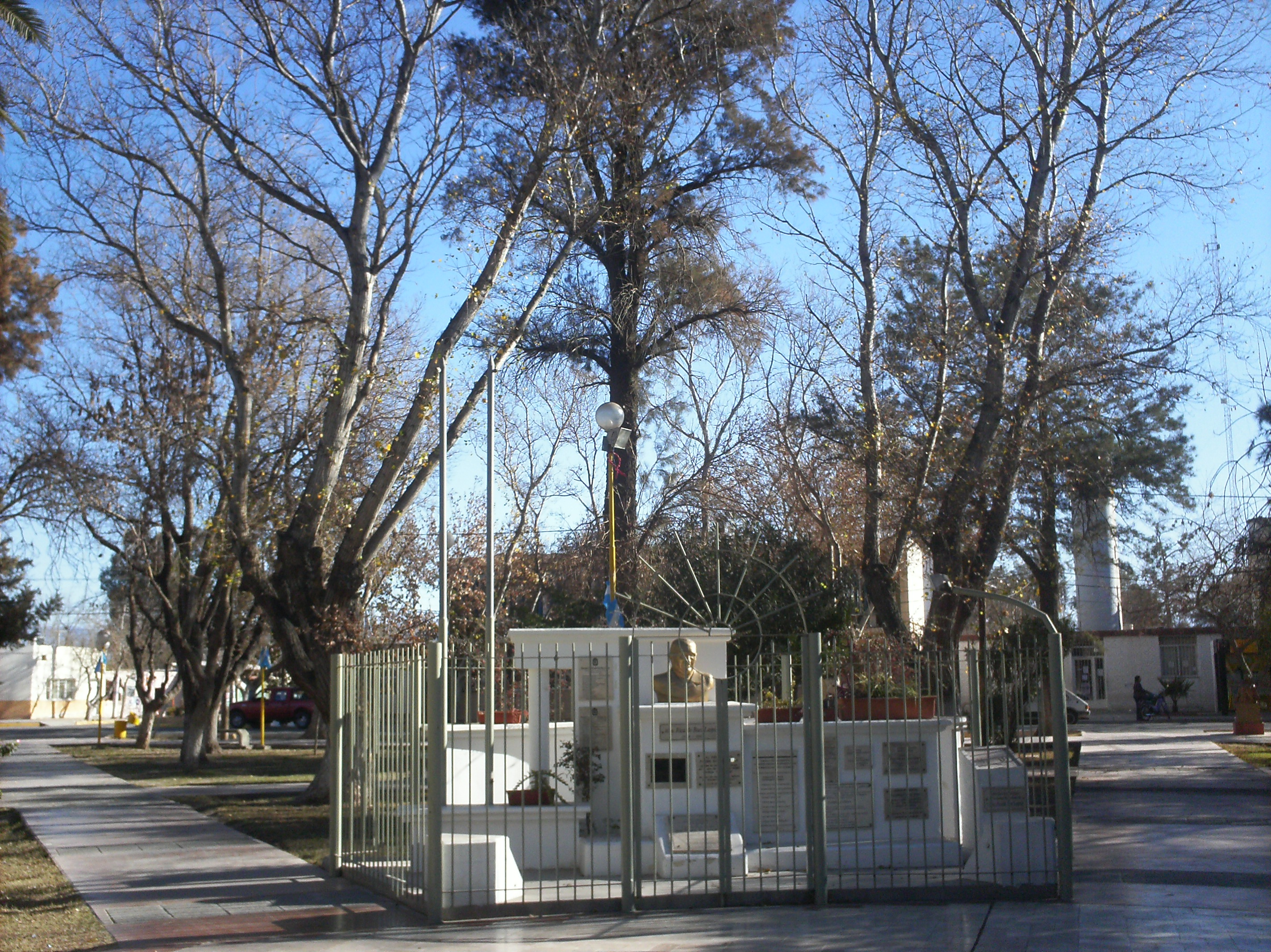

- Location within San Juan Province Location within Argentina
- Coordinates: 31°30′00″S 68°31′55″W
- Country: Argentina
- Province: San Juan
- Department: Chimbas
- Elevation: 644 m (2,113 ft)

Population (2010)
  - Total: 87,258
- Time zone: UTC−3 (ART)

Chimbas is a city located in the Chimbas Department, in the San Juan Province of Argentina. It is located in the northern sector of the urban agglomeration of Greater San Juan.
