= General Daniel Cerri =

- Town
- Location within Buenos Aires Province
- Coordinates: 38°41′S 62°23′W
- Country: Argentina
- Province: Buenos Aires
- Partidos: Bahía Blanca
- Elevation: 4 m (13 ft)

Population (2010)
  - Total: 6,745
- Time zone: UTC−3 (ART)
- CPA Base: B 8105
- Area code: +291 457-XXXX
- Climate: Dfc

General Daniel Cerri is a town located in the Bahía Blanca Partido of Buenos Aires Province, Argentina.
