= Club Sol de Mayo =

Argentine association football club

Sol de Mayo
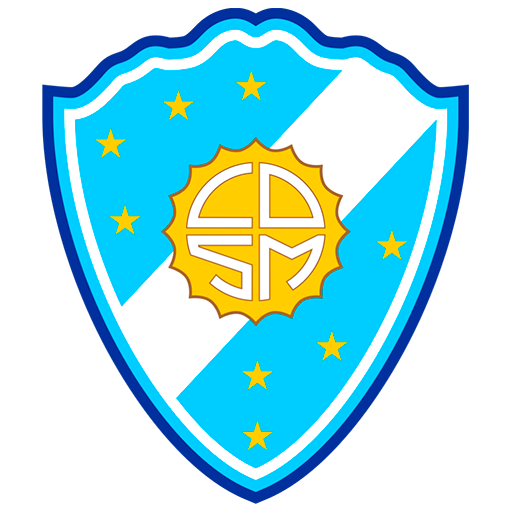
- Full name: Club Social y Deportivo Sol de Mayo
- Nickname: Albiceleste
- Founded: 1920; 106 years ago
- Ground: Estadio Albiceleste
- Capacity: 5000
- Chairman: Adán Valdebenito
- League: Torneo Federal A

Club Social y Deportivo Sol de Mayo is an association football club based in Viedma, Argentina.

== History ==
Club Sol de Mayo was founded in 1920. The club has seven sports teams, the main team being the football team. In 2023, they received attention among Argentine lower league football circles for signing players from Bangladesh, Russia, and Serbia, including Bangladesh national team captain Jamal Bhuyan.

== Colors ==
Club Sol de Mayo's colors are light blue and white, which feature in the club's crest and home jersey.

== Grounds ==
Club Sol de Mayo's home ground is the Estadio Albiceleste in Viedma, Argentina, which has a capacity of five thousand and was opened in 1939.
