= Club Atlético Sansinena Social y Deportivo =

Sansinena
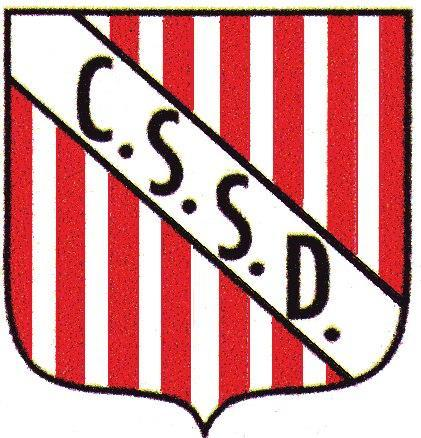
- Full name: Club Atlético Sansinena Social y Deportivo
- Nicknames: Rojiblanco; Tripero
- Founded: 12 June 1914; 111 years ago
- Ground: Estadio Luis Molina; General Daniel Cerri, Bahía Blanca Partido, Buenos Aires Province, Argentina
- Capacity: 5,000
- Chairman: (Argentina) José Semper
- Manager: (Argentina) Jorge Espinosa
- League: Torneo Federal A
- Website: http://clubsansinena.blogspot.com.ar/?m=1
Home colours	Away colours

Sansinena (Spanish: Club Atlético Sansinena Social y Deportivo, C.S.S.D.) is an Argentine football club from the city of General Daniel Cerri, Bahía Blanca Partido, Buenos Aires Province. It was founded on 12 June 1914 and currently plays in the Torneo Federal A.

== Current squad ==
Note: Flags indicate national team as defined under FIFA eligibility rules; some limited exceptions apply. Players may hold more than one non-FIFA nationality.

No.	Pos.	Nation	Player
—	GK	ARG	Emiliano Larrouy
—	GK	ARG	Mauro Alcaraz
—	DF	ARG	Fabio Lucanera
—	DF	ARG	Martin Poncetta
—	DF	ARG	Nicolás Ballestero
—	DF	ARG	Nicolás Rubén Palacios
—	DF	ARG	Maximiliano Tormann
—	DF	ARG	Nicolás Diaz Bender
—	MF	ARG	Eric Lischeske

No.	Pos.	Nation	Player
—	MF	ARG	Axel Lischeske
—	MF	ARG	Emanuel Dambolena
—	MF	ARG	Juan Pablo Scheffer
—	MF	ARG	Wálter Linares
—	MF	ARG	Gonzalo Medrano
—	FW	ARG	Mariano Mc Coubrey
—	FW	ARG	Diego Armando Gimenez
—	FW	ARG	Maximiliano Bowen
—	FW	ARG	Octavio Bilbao
