= 2026 Primera Nacional =

42nd season of the second-tier football league in Argentina

Primera Nacional
- Season: 2026
- Dates: 13 February – 19 December 2026
- Champions: Godoy Cruz (2nd title)
- Promoted: Godoy Cruz
- Relegated: Acassuso; San Miguel; Nueva Chicago; Güemes
- Matches: 659
- Goals: 1,287 (1.95 per match)
- Top goalscorer: Martín Pino (20 goals)
- Biggest home win: Gimnasia y Esgrima (J) 6–1 Almagro (19 April)
- Biggest away win: Temperley 0–5 Dep. Maipú (9 May)
- Highest scoring: Godoy Cruz 6–3 Estudiantes (BA) (18 October)
- All statistics correct as of 21 November 2026.

The 2026 Argentine Primera Nacional, officially known as the Campeonato de Primera Nacional Sur Finanzas 2026 for sponsorship purposes, is the 42nd season of the Primera Nacional, the second-tier competition of Argentine football. Thirty-six teams competed in the league, thirty of which took part in the 2025 season, along with two teams relegated from Liga Profesional, two teams promoted from Torneo Federal A and two teams promoted from Primera B Metropolitana. The fixture draw was held on 22 December 2025, and the season began on 13 February and is scheduled to end on 19 December 2026.

Godoy Cruz were the champions, winning their second Primera Nacional championship and becoming the first team promoted to the AFA Liga Profesional de Fútbol by defeating Tristán Suárez 3–1 in the championship final played on 15 November 2026.

== Format ==
For this season, the competition was played under the same format as the previous season, with the thirty-six participating teams split into two zones of 18 teams, where they played against the other teams in their group twice: once at home and once away. Interzonal matches between rival teams were also played as rival sides were paired together for the season draw and drawn into different zones.

Both zone winners played a final match on neutral ground to decide the first promoted team to the top flight for the following season, while the teams placing from second to eighth place in each zone play a knockout tournament (Torneo Reducido) for the second promotion berth along with the loser of the final between the zone winners. The bottom two teams from each zone were relegated to the third-tier leagues, Primera B Metropolitana (for teams located in Buenos Aires or its metropolitan area, or directly affiliated to AFA) or Torneo Federal A (for teams outside Greater Buenos Aires or indirectly affiliated to AFA).

Similar to previous seasons, fifteen Primera Nacional teams qualified for the following year's Copa Argentina through league performance, those being the top seven teams of each zone plus the best eighth-placed one.

== Club information ==
=== Stadia and locations ===
Locations of the 2026 Primera Nacional teams outside Greater Buenos Aires.
Locations of the 2026 Primera Nacional teams within Greater Buenos Aires.

Club	City	Province	Stadium	Capacity
Acassuso	Boulogne Sur Mer	Buenos Aires	La Quema	1,500
Agropecuario Argentino	Carlos Casares	Buenos Aires	Ofelia Rosenzuaig	8,000
All Boys	Buenos Aires	Capital Federal	Islas Malvinas	12,199
Almagro	José Ingenieros	Buenos Aires	Tres de Febrero	12,500
Almirante Brown	Isidro Casanova	Buenos Aires	Fragata Presidente Sarmiento	25,000
Atlanta	Buenos Aires	Capital Federal	Don León Kolbowski	14,000
Atlético de Rafaela	Rafaela	Santa Fe	Nuevo Monumental	16,000
Central Norte	Salta	Salta	Padre Ernesto Martearena	20,408
Chacarita Juniors	Villa Maipú	Buenos Aires	Chacarita Juniors	19,000
Chaco For Ever	Resistencia	Chaco	Juan Alberto García	23,000
Ciudad de Bolívar	San Carlos de Bolívar	Buenos Aires	Municipal Eva Perón	4,000
Colegiales	Florida Oeste	Buenos Aires	Libertarios Unidos	6,500
Colón	Santa Fe	Santa Fe	Brigadier Estanislao López	40,000
Defensores de Belgrano	Buenos Aires	Capital Federal	Juan Pasquale	9,000
Deportivo Madryn	Puerto Madryn	Chubut	Abel Sastre	8,000
Deportivo Maipú	Maipú	Mendoza	Omar Higinio Sperdutti	8,000
Deportivo Morón	Morón	Buenos Aires	Nuevo Francisco Urbano	32,000
Estudiantes	Caseros	Buenos Aires	Ciudad de Caseros	16,740
Ferrocarril Midland	Libertad	Buenos Aires	Ciudad de Libertad	9,000
Ferro Carril Oeste	Buenos Aires	Capital Federal	Ricardo Etcheverri	24,442
Gimnasia y Esgrima	Jujuy	Jujuy	23 de Agosto	23,200
Gimnasia y Tiro	Salta	Salta	Gigante del Norte	24,300
Godoy Cruz	Godoy Cruz	Mendoza	Feliciano Gambarte	21,000
Güemes	Santiago del Estero	Santiago del Estero	Arturo Miranda	15,000
Los Andes	Lomas de Zamora	Buenos Aires	Eduardo Gallardón	38,000
Mitre	Santiago del Estero	Santiago del Estero	José y Antonio Castiglione	10,500
Nueva Chicago	Buenos Aires	Capital Federal	Nueva Chicago	28,500
Patronato	Paraná	Entre Ríos	Presbítero Bartolomé Grella	22,000
Quilmes	Quilmes	Buenos Aires	Centenario	35,200
Racing	Córdoba	Córdoba	Miguel Sancho	15,000
San Martín	San Juan	San Juan	Ingeniero Hilario Sánchez	26,500
San Martín	Tucumán	Tucumán	La Ciudadela	30,250
San Miguel	Los Polvorines	Buenos Aires	Malvinas Argentinas	7,176
San Telmo	Dock Sud	Buenos Aires	Osvaldo Baletto	2,000
Temperley	Temperley	Buenos Aires	Alfredo Beranger	13,000
Tristán Suárez	Tristán Suárez	Buenos Aires	20 de Octubre	15,000

== Zone A ==
=== Standings ===
Pos	Team	Pld	W	D	L	GF	GA	GD	Pts	Qualification or relegation
1	Godoy Cruz	36	19	9	8	53	33	+20	66	Advance to Championship final and qualification for Copa Argentina
2	Ferro Carril Oeste	36	19	9	8	38	31	+7	66	Advance to Torneo Reducido and qualification for Copa Argentina
3	Deportivo Morón	36	18	7	11	53	37	+16	61	Advance to Torneo Reducido and qualification for Copa Argentina
4	Deportivo Madryn	36	16	12	8	52	31	+21	60	Advance to Torneo Reducido and qualification for Copa Argentina
5	Colón	36	16	12	8	45	27	+18	60	Advance to Torneo Reducido and qualification for Copa Argentina
6	Almirante Brown	36	13	12	11	30	26	+4	51	Advance to Torneo Reducido and qualification for Copa Argentina
7	Ciudad de Bolívar	36	13	12	11	30	33	−3	51	Advance to Torneo Reducido and qualification for Copa Argentina
8	Estudiantes (BA)	36	13	10	13	35	35	0	49	Advance to Torneo Reducido
9	Chaco For Ever	36	12	10	14	39	37	+2	46	
10	Los Andes	36	9	16	11	27	26	+1	43	
11	All Boys	36	8	17	11	22	30	−8	41	
12	San Telmo	36	10	11	15	30	41	−11	41	
13	Mitre (SdE)	36	8	16	12	31	42	−11	40	
14	Racing (C)	36	10	10	16	32	45	−13	40	
15	Defensores de Belgrano	36	8	15	13	25	34	−9	39	
16	Central Norte	36	7	17	12	23	32	−9	38	
17	Acassuso (R)	36	8	11	17	25	35	−10	35	Relegation to Primera B Metropolitana
18	San Miguel (R)	36	6	15	15	27	42	−15	33	Relegation to Primera B Metropolitana

Source: AFA
Rules for classification: 1) points; 2) play-off (only for deciding relegation); 3) goal difference; 4) goals scored; 5) head-to-head points; 6) head-to-head goal difference; 7) head-to-head goals scored.
(R) Relegated

=== Results ===
Home \ Away	ACA	ALL	ABR	CEN	CFE	CIU	COL	DBE	DEM	DMO	EBA	FCO	GOD	LAN	MIT	RAC	SMI	STE
Acassuso	—	0–1	0–0	2–1	2–0	0–1	1–1	1–0	0–0	0–3	0–1	0–0	0–1	0–1	2–0	3–0	0–2	1–2
All Boys	0–0	—	1–1	1–1	0–0	0–0	0–0	0–0	1–0	1–0	1–0	0–0	0–0	0–0	2–1	1–1	1–1	0–1
Almirante Brown	0–1	2–1	—	1–0	1–0	2–0	1–1	0–2	1–0	1–0	0–0	0–0	1–0	1–0	3–1	2–0	1–1	0–0
Central Norte	0–0	1–0	0–0	—	1–1	0–1	0–0	0–1	2–3	0–0	2–1	1–1	1–0	1–0	1–1	1–1	1–1	0–0
Chaco For Ever	1–1	2–0	1–0	1–2	—	0–1	1–0	2–2	1–2	2–0	1–0	1–2	1–1	1–0	1–1	3–1	3–0	2–2
Ciudad de Bolívar	1–0	0–0	0–0	0–0	2–1	—	0–2	1–0	1–0	1–2	1–2	2–4	3–1	1–1	0–2	1–1	1–1	1–0
Colón	1–0	3–2	2–2	4–0	0–1	0–0	—	2–0	2–1	1–2	1–0	1–1	0–0	3–0	1–1	1–0	3–0	1–0
Defensores de Belgrano	0–3	0–1	0–2	1–1	0–0	0–0	0–3	—	2–1	2–1	1–1	0–1	1–1	1–1	0–0	3–0	0–0	1–0
Deportivo Madryn	0–0	2–0	2–1	0–0	1–2	3–1	1–2	2–1	—	1–1	3–0	0–1	2–0	2–1	4–0	2–0	2–2	4–1
Deportivo Morón	4–1	2–1	1–0	2–0	3–2	2–0	2–0	1–1	2–2	—	2–0	4–0	1–2	0–0	0–2	2–1	2–1	1–0
Estudiantes (BA)	1–0	2–1	0–1	1–0	0–0	1–2	1–1	0–2	0–1	2–0	—	2–2	1–0	1–1	3–0	1–1	2–1	1–1
Ferro Carril Oeste	2–1	1–0	0–1	1–0	0–3	1–0	2–0	2–1	0–2	1–0	0–1	—	1–3	0–2	0–0	1–0	1–1	2–1
Godoy Cruz	2–0	4–0	2–1	2–1	2–1	1–1	2–0	1–0	0–0	2–2	6–3	2–1	—	2–1	2–1	2–1	0–0	3–0
Los Andes	0–0	1–1	0–0	0–0	2–0	3–1	1–1	0–1	0–0	2–1	0–0	1–2	1–0	—	0–0	2–0	1–1	0–0
Mitre (SdE)	2–0	1–1	0–0	2–2	0–0	1–1	0–0	2–1	1–3	1–3	1–0	0–1	0–3	0–3	—	1–0	4–0	0–2
Racing (C)	3–2	1–2	2–1	1–2	2–0	0–2	1–0	3–0	2–2	1–2	1–0	0–0	2–2	1–0	0–0	—	1–0	2–1
San Miguel	0–0	1–1	1–0	1–0	2–0	1–2	1–2	0–0	0–1	2–1	1–1	0–1	1–2	0–2	0–2	1–2	—	1–1
San Telmo	2–3	1–0	3–2	1–0	1–3	0–1	3–1	0–0	0–0	2–2	0–1	0–2	2–0	0–0	0–0	2–0	1–0	—

Source: AFA
Legend: Blue = home team win; Yellow = draw; Red = away team win.

== Zone B ==
=== Standings ===
Pos	Team	Pld	W	D	L	GF	GA	GD	Pts	Qualification or relegation
1	Tristán Suárez	36	16	16	4	34	16	+18	64	Advance to Championship final and qualification for Copa Argentina
2	Atlanta	36	19	5	12	42	34	+8	62	Advance to Torneo Reducido and qualification for Copa Argentina
3	Temperley	36	16	13	7	43	31	+12	61	Advance to Torneo Reducido and qualification for Copa Argentina
4	Gimnasia y Esgrima (J)	36	16	10	10	53	49	+4	58	Advance to Torneo Reducido and qualification for Copa Argentina
5	Ferrocarril Midland	36	15	10	11	43	29	+14	55	Advance to Torneo Reducido and qualification for Copa Argentina
6	Deportivo Maipú	36	14	10	12	43	34	+9	52	Advance to Torneo Reducido and qualification for Copa Argentina
7	Colegiales	36	14	10	12	36	32	+4	52	Advance to Torneo Reducido and qualification for Copa Argentina
8	Gimnasia y Tiro	36	14	10	12	37	35	+2	52	Advance to Torneo Reducido and qualification for Copa Argentina
9	San Martín (SJ)	36	13	12	11	42	36	+6	51	
10	San Martín (T)	36	11	14	11	39	37	+2	47	
11	Atlético de Rafaela	36	12	11	13	29	35	−6	47	
12	Agropecuario Argentino	36	12	10	14	31	39	−8	46	
13	Quilmes	36	12	9	15	33	30	+3	45	
14	Chacarita Juniors	36	12	6	18	29	35	−6	42	
15	Almagro	36	11	9	16	33	44	−11	42	
16	Patronato	36	7	17	12	29	35	−6	38	
17	Nueva Chicago (R)	36	9	10	17	25	36	−11	37	Relegation to Primera B Metropolitana
18	Güemes (R)	36	6	9	21	28	62	−34	27	Relegation to Torneo Federal A

Source: AFA
Rules for classification: 1) points; 2) play-off (only for deciding relegation); 3) goal difference; 4) goals scored; 5) head-to-head points; 6) head-to-head goal difference; 7) head-to-head goals scored.
(R) Relegated

=== Results ===
Home \ Away	AGA	ALM	ATL	ATR	CHA	CLG	DMA	FRM	GEJ	GYT	GÜE	NCH	PAT	QUI	SMA	SMT	TEM	TRI
Agropecuario Argentino	—	2–1	0–0	2–0	1–0	0–3	2–1	0–0	1–2	1–0	3–0	0–2	1–1	0–0	2–1	2–0	0–0	0–2
Almagro	2–1	—	2–0	1–0	2–1	0–0	2–2	1–1	1–2	0–2	2–0	0–1	0–1	1–0	1–2	0–1	1–1	1–1
Atlanta	1–0	1–3	—	2–0	1–0	1–0	3–1	0–0	3–0	1–1	2–0	1–2	0–0	1–0	0–1	1–0	1–0	3–1
Atlético de Rafaela	4–1	0–0	2–3	—	1–0	1–0	1–3	1–0	0–0	1–0	1–2	1–0	0–0	1–0	1–0	4–2	1–0	2–1
Chacarita Juniors	2–1	1–0	0–1	0–1	—	2–0	1–0	1–0	3–1	2–0	0–0	2–0	1–0	3–0	1–1	1–2	0–1	0–0
Colegiales	0–0	1–0	1–0	1–1	2–1	—	1–0	3–0	2–1	1–2	4–1	1–0	2–2	3–1	2–0	2–0	1–1	0–0
Deportivo Maipú	2–0	1–0	4–2	2–1	3–2	3–1	—	0–1	1–1	0–0	3–1	1–0	0–0	1–0	1–1	0–0	1–0	0–1
Ferrocarril Midland	2–0	1–1	1–2	4–0	1–0	2–0	2–0	—	1–1	3–0	2–1	2–0	1–0	1–0	0–1	2–0	0–0	0–1
Gimnasia y Esgrima (J)	1–1	6–1	1–2	2–1	1–1	2–1	1–1	2–1	—	2–2	2–1	4–0	2–0	1–0	2–1	2–2	1–0	0–2
Gimnasia y Tiro	2–3	2–0	3–1	1–0	1–0	2–1	1–0	1–0	1–1	—	1–1	2–0	1–1	0–1	1–1	1–0	0–0	0–0
Güemes	1–1	2–1	0–2	0–0	2–1	0–1	1–0	0–2	1–3	1–3	—	0–1	1–0	2–1	0–2	0–2	2–2	1–3
Nueva Chicago	1–1	1–2	0–1	0–0	2–0	0–0	0–1	2–2	0–1	3–1	2–0	—	1–1	1–0	1–1	2–1	1–1	0–0
Patronato	0–2	0–1	2–0	0–0	2–0	2–0	0–0	1–1	3–3	1–2	2–0	2–1	—	3–3	3–0	0–1	0–0	1–1
Quilmes	0–1	1–1	2–1	2–0	0–0	0–1	2–1	0–0	2–0	1–0	2–0	0–0	3–0	—	1–0	2–1	0–1	0–1
San Martín (SJ)	2–0	1–2	1–2	1–1	0–1	2–0	2–1	3–2	5–1	3–1	2–1	1–0	1–1	1–0	—	1–1	1–1	0–0
San Martín (T)	3–0	3–0	0–1	2–1	1–1	0–0	2–2	3–2	2–0	1–0	1–1	2–0	0–0	0–0	1–1	—	1–2	0–0
Temperley	1–0	3–1	2–1	2–0	0–1	3–1	0–5	2–1	2–1	1–2	4–1	2–1	0–0	3–3	2–1	1–1	—	1–0
Tristán Suárez	2–0	0–0	0–0	0–0	1–0	0–0	0–0	1–3	3–0	2–1	1–1	1–0	1–0	0–0	2–1	2–0	0–0	—

Source: AFA
Legend: Blue = home team win; Yellow = draw; Red = away team win.

== Interzonal matches ==
The interzonal matches were played on the seventh and twenty-fifth matchdays.

Round 7
Home	Score	Away
Nueva Chicago	0–0	All Boys
Atlanta	0–1	Ferro Carril Oeste
Deportivo Madryn	1–1	San Martín (T)
Chaco For Ever	1–2	Gimnasia y Esgrima (J)
Almagro	2–0	Deportivo Morón
Chacarita Juniors	0–3	Estudiantes (BA)
San Martín (SJ)	0–0	Racing (C)
Los Andes	0–1	Temperley
Güemes	2–2	Mitre (SdE)
Almirante Brown	0–1	Tristán Suárez
Ciudad de Bolívar	0–0	Agropecuario Argentino
Patronato	0–2	Colón
Gimnasia y Tiro	0–1	Central Norte
Deportivo Maipú	0–1	Godoy Cruz
San Telmo	0–3	Quilmes
Colegiales	0–0	San Miguel
Defensores de Belgrano	1–1	Atlético de Rafaela
Ferrocarril Midland	1–0	Acassuso

Round 25
Home	Score	Away
All Boys	1–0	Nueva Chicago
Ferro Carril Oeste	3–1	Atlanta
San Martín (T)	2–2	Deportivo Madryn
Gimnasia y Esgrima (J)	1–0	Chaco For Ever
Deportivo Morón	2–0	Almagro
Estudiantes (BA)	2–0	Chacarita Juniors
Racing (C)	0–0	San Martín (SJ)
Temperley	3–0	Los Andes
Mitre (SdE)	1–1	Güemes
Tristán Suárez	3–1	Almirante Brown
Agropecuario Argentino	1–0	Ciudad de Bolívar
Colón	3–0	Patronato
Central Norte	0–0	Gimnasia y Tiro
Godoy Cruz	1–2	Deportivo Maipú
Quilmes	3–0	San Telmo
San Miguel	2–0	Colegiales
Atlético de Rafaela	0–0	Defensores de Belgrano
Acassuso	1–1	Ferrocarril Midland

== Championship final ==
The top teams of each zone played a match on neutral ground to decide the champions and the first team promoted to the Liga Profesional. The losing team will enter the Torneo Reducido in the second round.

15 November 2026
17:00 UTC−3

Godoy Cruz	3–1	Tristán Suárez
Burgos 11' (pen.); Rodríguez 31'; Pino 67'	Report	Enrique 39'

Estadio Julio César Villagra, Córdoba
Referee: Nicolás Ramírez

Team details

Godoy Cruz
Tristán Suárez

GK	1	Juan Strumia
DF	4	Francisco Gerometta
DF	2	Nahuel Brunet		(substituted off) 82'
DF	6	Esteban Burgos
DF	3	Diego Viera
MF	8	Felipe Cairus
MF	5	Benjamín Schamine		(substituted off) 46'
MF	10	Vicente Poggi
FW	7	Axel Rodríguez	(yellow card) 53'	(substituted off) 62'
FW	9	Martín Pino		(substituted off) 82'
FW	11	Rodrigo Nicolás Fernández		(substituted off) 72'
Substitutions:
DF	13	Juan Morán		(substituted on) 82'
DF	15	Federico Milo		(substituted on) 72'
MF	16	Gastón Gil Romero		(substituted on) 46'
MF	20	Santiago Martínez	(yellow card) 83'	(substituted on) 62'
FW	19	Fabricio Oviedo		(substituted on) 82'
Manager:
(Argentina) Pablo De Muner

GK	1	Joaquín Bigo	(yellow card) 86'
DF	4	Brian Aguilar	(yellow card) 52'	(substituted off) 74'
DF	2	Mauricio Guzmán	(yellow card) 49'
DF	6	Agustín Baldi	(yellow card) 36' (yellow-red card) 86'
DF	3	Nicolás Fernández		(substituted off) 71'
MF	8	Nicolás del Priore
MF	5	Marcos Enrique
MF	10	Diego Becker		(substituted off) 71'
MF	11	Kevin Colli		(substituted off) 51'
FW	7	Manuel Guillén
FW	9	Renzo Conechny		(substituted off) 71'
Substitutions:
DF	16	Diego Mastrángelo		(substituted on) 71'
MF	18	Nicolás Sánchez		(substituted on) 74'
FW	20	Agustín Gallo		(substituted on) 71'
FW	21	Maximiliano Álvarez		(substituted on) 71'
FW	22	Sebastián Ramírez		(substituted on) 51'
Manager:
(Argentina) José María Martínez

== Torneo Reducido ==
The teams placing second to eighth place in each zone, along with the loser of the championship final will play the Torneo Reducido for the second and last promotion berth to Liga Profesional, in which teams will be seeded in each round according to their final placement in the first stage of the tournament. The first round was played over a single match, at the stadium of the higher-seeded team. The second round (in which the championship final loser will enter the Reducido), the semi-finals and the finals will be played over two legs, with the higher-seeded team hosting the second leg. In all rounds except for the final, the higher-seeded team will advance in case of a tie, with a penalty shoot-out set to be played in case of a draw on aggregate in the final.

The Torneo Reducido is taking place from 14 November to 19 December 2026.

=== First round ===
14 November 2026	Atlanta (bsr)	1–1	Estudiantes (BA)	Buenos Aires
15:00 UTC−3	Álvarez 51'	Report	Correa 47'	Stadium: Don León Kolbowski; Referee: Maximiliano Macheroni

14 November 2026	Temperley	1–2	Ciudad de Bolívar	Turdera
16:00 UTC−3	Hauche 37'	Report	Martínez 42'; Peralta 76'	Stadium: Alfredo Beranger; Referee: Pablo Giménez

14 November 2026	Colón	1–0	Ferrocarril Midland	Santa Fe
18:00 UTC−3	Rasmussen 39'	Report		Stadium: Brigadier General Estanislao López; Referee: Juan Pablo Loustau

14 November 2026	Deportivo Madryn	3–1	Deportivo Maipú	Puerto Madryn
19:00 UTC−3	Bersano 18'; Solís 47'; Silba 62' (pen.)	Report	Orosco 74' (pen.)	Stadium: Abel Sastre; Referee: Bryan Ferreira
Note: The match was abandoned in the 81st minute with Deportivo Madryn leading 3–1 due to a noise bomb exploding near the visiting team's goalkeeper. On 19 November 2026, the Argentine Football Association's Disciplinary Tribunal confirmed the end of the match with Deportivo Madryn as winners.

14 November 2026	Gimnasia y Esgrima (J)	2–0	Almirante Brown	Jujuy
20:00 UTC−3	Cachi 54' (pen.); Bianchi 72'	Report		Stadium: 23 de Agosto; Referee: Yamil Possi

15 November 2026	Deportivo Morón (bsr)	1–1	Colegiales	Morón
15:00 UTC−3	Iñíguez 33'	Report	Monserrat 17'	Stadium: Nuevo Francisco Urbano; Referee: Juan Cruz Robledo

15 November 2026	Ferro Carril Oeste	0–1	Gimnasia y Tiro	Buenos Aires
20:00 UTC−3		Report	Rojas 14'	Stadium: Arquitecto Ricardo Etcheverri; Referee: Maximiliano Manduca

=== Second round ===
Team 1	Agg.	Team 2	1st leg	2nd leg
Gimnasia y Tiro		Tristán Suárez	22 Nov	
Ciudad de Bolívar		Atlanta	0–1	
Colón		Deportivo Morón	0–0	
Gimnasia y Esgrima (J)		Deportivo Madryn	1–0	

==== First leg ====
21 November 2026	Ciudad de Bolívar	0–1	Atlanta	San Carlos de Bolívar
17:00 UTC−3		Report	Romero 26'	Stadium: Municipal Eva Perón; Referee: Daniel Zamora

21 November 2026	Colón	0–0	Deportivo Morón	Santa Fe
17:30 UTC−3		Report		Stadium: Brigadier General Estanislao López; Referee: Fabricio Llobet

21 November 2026	Gimnasia y Esgrima (J)	1–0	Deportivo Madryn	Jujuy
21:30 UTC−3	Varela 70'	Report		Stadium: 23 de Agosto; Referee: Bruno Amiconi

22 November 2026	Gimnasia y Tiro	v	Tristán Suárez	Salta
21:00 UTC−3		Report		Stadium: El Gigante del Norte; Referee: Javier Delbarba

==== Second leg ====
November 2026	Tristán Suárez	v	Gimnasia y Tiro	Tristán Suárez
--:-- UTC−3		Report		Stadium: 20 de Octubre

November 2026	Atlanta	v	Ciudad de Bolívar	Buenos Aires
--:-- UTC−3		Report		Stadium: Don León Kolbowski

November 2026	Deportivo Morón	v	Colón	Morón
--:-- UTC−3		Report		Stadium: Nuevo Francisco Urbano

November 2026	Deportivo Madryn	v	Gimnasia y Esgrima (J)	Puerto Madryn
--:-- UTC−3		Report		Stadium: Abel Sastre

== Copa Argentina qualification ==
Fifteen Primera Nacional teams qualified for the round of 32 of the 2027 Copa Argentina, which were the top seven teams of each zone and the best eighth-placed team at the end of the season, which was selected according to points, goal difference, goals scored, and a drawing of lots if needed.

=== Ranking of eighth-placed teams ===
Pos	Grp	Team	Pld	W	D	L	GF	GA	GD	Pts	Qualification
1	B	Gimnasia y Tiro	36	14	10	12	37	35	+2	52	Qualification for Copa Argentina
2	A	Estudiantes (BA)	36	13	10	13	35	35	0	49	

Source: AFA
Rules for classification: 1) Points; 2) Goal difference; 3) Goals scored; 4) Drawing of lots.

== Season statistics ==
=== Top scorers ===
As of 21 November 2026

Rank	Player	Club	Goals
1	(Argentina) Martín Pino	Godoy Cruz	20
2	(Argentina) Luis Silba	Deportivo Madryn	16
3	(Argentina) Ignacio Lago	Colón	15
4	(Uruguay) Franco Fagúndez	Deportivo Morón	14
5	(Argentina) Lautaro Gordillo	Gimnasia y Tiro	13
5	(Argentina) Nazareno Fúnez	San Martín (SJ)	13
7	(Argentina) Marcos Machado	Mitre (SdE)	12
8	(Argentina) Pablo Chavarría	Racing (C)	11
9	(Argentina) Juan Sánchez Sotelo	Güemes	10
10	(Argentina) Juan Cruz Vega	Agropecuario Argentino	9
10	(Argentina) Matías Romero	Chaco For Ever	9
10	(Argentina) Lautaro Parisi	Ferro Carril Oeste	9
10	(Argentina) Mauricio Asenjo	Los Andes	9
10	(Argentina) Aarón Spetale	Quilmes	9
10	(Argentina) Agustín Lavezzi	Quilmes	9
10	(Argentina) Gabriel Hauche	Temperley	9

== See also ==
- 2026 Liga Profesional
- 2026 Copa Argentina
- 2026 Torneo Federal A
