= 2026 Godoy Cruz Antonio Tomba season =

Godoy Cruz
2026 season
- Manager: Mariano Toedtli (until 3 May); Pablo De Muner (from 4 May)
- Stadium: Estadio Feliciano Gambarte
- Primera Nacional: 2nd
- Copa Argentina: Round of 64
- Top goalscorer: League: Martín Pino (19); All: Martín Pino (19)
- Biggest win: Godoy Cruz 4–0 All Boys

During the 2026 season, Godoy Cruz competes in the Primera Nacional and the Copa Argentina.

== Transfers ==
=== In ===
Pos.	Player	Transferred from	Fee	Date	Source
MF	(Argentina) Brian Orosco	(Argentina) Estudiantes	Free	17 January 2026	
FW	(Argentina) Axel Rodríguez	(Argentina) Olimpo	Loan	21 February 2026	

=== Out ===
Pos.	Player	Transferred to	Fee	Date	Source
MF	(Argentina) Tomás Pozzo	(Uruguay) Defensor Sporting	Loan	28 July 2026	
MF	(Argentina) Brian Orosco	(Argentina) Deportivo Maipú	Free	5 August 2026	
DF	(Argentina) Mateo Mendoza	(Argentina) Argentinos Juniors	Loan	14 September 2026	

== Competitions ==
=== Overall record ===
Competition	First match	Last match	Starting round	Record							
Competition	First match	Last match	Starting round	Pld	W	D	L	GF	GA	GD	Win %
Primera Nacional	13 February 2026		Matchday 1	35	18	9	8	51	32	+19	51.43
Copa Argentina	25 February 2026			1	0	0	1	0	1	−1	0.00
Total				36	18	9	9	51	33	+18	50.00

Last updated: 25 October 2026
Source: Competitions

=== Primera Nacional ===
==== Zone B ====
Pos	Team	Pld	W	D	L	GF	GA	GD	Pts	Qualification or relegation
1	Ferro Carril Oeste (X)	35	19	8	8	38	31	+7	65	Advance to Championship final and qualification for Copa Argentina
2	Godoy Cruz (X)	35	18	9	8	51	32	+19	63	Advance to Torneo Reducido and qualification for Copa Argentina
3	Deportivo Morón (Q)	35	17	7	11	51	37	+14	58	Advance to Torneo Reducido and qualification for Copa Argentina
4	Deportivo Madryn (Q)	35	15	12	8	51	31	+20	57	Advance to Torneo Reducido and qualification for Copa Argentina
5	Colón (Q)	35	15	12	8	43	27	+16	57	Advance to Torneo Reducido and qualification for Copa Argentina
6	Almirante Brown (Y)	35	13	12	10	29	24	+5	51	Advance to Torneo Reducido and qualification for Copa Argentina
7	Ciudad de Bolívar (Y)	35	13	12	10	30	31	−1	51	Advance to Torneo Reducido and qualification for Copa Argentina
8	Estudiantes (BA) (Y)	35	13	10	12	35	34	+1	49	Advance to Torneo Reducido and possible qualification for Copa Argentina
9	Chaco For Ever	35	11	10	14	36	36	0	43	
10	Los Andes	35	9	15	11	27	26	+1	42	
11	Racing (C)	35	10	10	15	31	42	−11	40	
12	Defensores de Belgrano	35	8	15	12	25	32	−7	39	
13	Mitre (SdE)	35	8	15	12	31	42	−11	39	
14	Central Norte	35	7	17	11	23	31	−8	38	
15	All Boys	35	7	17	11	21	30	−9	38	
16	San Telmo	35	9	11	15	29	41	−12	38	
17	Acassuso (R)	35	8	10	17	25	35	−10	34	Relegation to Primera B Metropolitana
18	San Miguel (R)	35	6	15	14	27	41	−14	33	Relegation to Primera B Metropolitana

Updated to match(es) played on 26 October 2026. Source: AFA
Rules for classification: 1) points; 2) play-off (only for deciding relegation); 3) goal difference; 4) goals scored; 5) head-to-head points; 6) head-to-head goal difference; 7) head-to-head goals scored.
(Q) Qualified for the phase indicated; (R) Relegated; (X) Assured of at least Torneo Reducido and qualified for Copa Argentina; (Y) Assured of at least Torneo Reducido

==== Results summary ====
Overall								Home						Away					
Pld	W	D	L	GF	GA	GD	Pts	W	D	L	GF	GA	GD	W	D	L	GF	GA	GD
0	0	0	0	0	0	0	0	0	0	0	0	0	0	0	0	0	0	0	0

Last updated: 25 October 2026.

==== Results by round ====
Round	1	2	3	4	5	6	7	8	9	10	11	12	13	14	15	16	17	18	19	20	21	22	23	24	25	26	27	28	29	30	31	32	33	34	35	36
Ground	H	A	H	A	H	A	A	H	A	H	A	H	H	A	H	A	H	A	A	H	A	H	A	H	H	A	H	A	H	A	A	H	A	H	A	H
Result	D	D	D	L	W	D	W	W	L	D	D	D	W	L	W	L	W	L	L	W	L	W	W	W	L	W	W	W	W	W	D	W	D	W	W	
Position	7	9	11	16	10	13	10	4	6	6	9	9	6	8	7	8	7	9	9	9	9	8	7	6	6	6	6									
Points	1	2	3	3	6	7	10	13	13	14	15	16	19	19	22	22	25	25	25	28	28	31	34	37	37	40	43	46	49	52	53	56	57	60	63	

Updated to match(es) played on 25 October 2026. Source:
A = Away; H = Home; W = Win; D = Draw; L = Loss

13 February 2026 1	Godoy Cruz	1–1	Ciudad de Bolívar

22 February 2026 2	Defensores de Belgrano	1–1	Godoy Cruz

1 March 2026 3	Godoy Cruz	0–0	Deportivo Madryn

14 March 2026 5	Godoy Cruz	2–1	Ferro Carril Oeste

21 March 2026 6	Chaco For Ever	1–1	Godoy Cruz

29 March 2026 7	Deportivo Maipú	0–1	Godoy Cruz

4 April 2026 8	Godoy Cruz	2–0	Acassuso

11 April 2026 9	San Telmo	2–0	Godoy Cruz

18 April 2026 10	Godoy Cruz	0–0	San Miguel

26 April 2026 11	Colón	0–0	Godoy Cruz

3 May 2026 12	Godoy Cruz	2–2	Deportivo Morón

10 May 2026 13	Godoy Cruz	2–1	Racing de Córdoba

16 May 2026 14	Los Andes	1–0	Godoy Cruz

24 May 2026 15	Godoy Cruz	4–0	All Boys

30 May 2026 16	Estudiantes de Buenos Aires	1–0	Godoy Cruz

7 June 2026 17	Godoy Cruz	2–1	Mitre

14 June 2026 18	Almirante Brown	1–0	Godoy Cruz

21 June 2026 4	Central Norte	1–0	Godoy Cruz

4 July 2026 19	Ciudad de Bolívar	3–1	Godoy Cruz

12 July 2026 20	Godoy Cruz	1–0	Defensores de Belgrano

26 July 2026 22	Godoy Cruz	2–1	Central Norte

1 August 2026 23	Ferro Carril Oeste	1–3	Godoy Cruz

9 August 2026 24	Godoy Cruz	2–1	Chaco For Ever

15 August 2026 25	Godoy Cruz	1–2	Deportivo Maipú

21 August 2026 26	Acassuso	0–1	Godoy Cruz

25 August 2026 21	Deportivo Madryn	2–0	Godoy Cruz

30 August 2026 27	Godoy Cruz	3–0	San Telmo

6 September 2026 28	San Miguel	1–2	Godoy Cruz

13 September 2026 29	Godoy Cruz	2–0	Colón

20 September 2026 30	Deportivo Morón	1–2	Godoy Cruz

27 September 2026 31	Racing de Córdoba	2–2	Godoy Cruz

4 October 2026 32	Godoy Cruz	2–1	Los Andes

12 October 2026 33	All Boys	0–0	Godoy Cruz

18 October 2026 34	Godoy Cruz	6–3	Estudiantes de Buenos Aires

25 October 2026 35	Mitre	0–3	Godoy Cruz

31 October 2026 36	Godoy Cruz	v	Almirante Brown
17:00

=== Copa Argentina ===
25 February 2026 Round of 64	Godoy Cruz	0–1	Deportivo Morón
21:15			Santiago 26' (o.g.)
