= 2026 Torneo Federal A =

XIV Torneo Federal A
- Season: 2026
- Champions: San Martín (F) (1st title)
- Promoted: San Martín (F)
- Relegated: Tucumán Central; Santamarina; Sarmiento (R); Sol de Mayo
- Matches: 517
- Goals: 990 (1.91 per match)
- Biggest home win: Alvarado 5-0 Germinal (July 5)
- Biggest away win: Independiente (Ch) 0-4 Douglas Haig (June 28)
- Highest scoring: Guillermo Brown 3-4 Kimberley (April 26)
- All statistics correct as of November 17, 2026.

The 2026 Argentine Torneo Federal A was the fourteenth season of the Torneo Federal A, the regionalised third tier of the Argentine football league system. The tournament is reserved for teams indirectly affiliated to the Asociación del Fútbol Argentino (AFA), while teams affiliated to AFA have to play the Primera B Metropolitana, which is the other third-tier competition. The competition was contested by 32 of the 36 teams that took part in the 2025 season, with one team relegated from Primera Nacional and four teams promoted from Torneo Regional Federal Amateur; Two teams were promoted to Primera Nacional and four teams were relegated to Torneo Regional Federal Amateur. The season began on March 22 and ended in December 2026.

== Format ==
=== First stage ===
The thirty-seven teams were divided into four zones, one with ten teams and three with nine teams in each zone and it was played in a round-robin tournament whereby each team played each one of the other teams two times. The teams placed 1st to 5th from the zone with ten teams, the teams placed 1st to 4th from each zone with nine teams and the best third place from the zones with nine teams qualified for the championship stages. The remaining teams qualify for the revalida stage.

=== Championship stages ===
==== Second stage ====
The eighteen teams were divided into two zones with nine teams each and it was played in a round-robin tournament whereby each team played each one of the other teams one time. The teams placed 1st to 4th qualified for the third stage. The remaining ten teams qualified for the second phase of the revalida stage.

==== Third stage ====
The eight teams play a two-legged tie and the winners advance to the fourth stage. The losing teams qualified for the second phase of the revalida stage.

==== Fourth stage ====
The four teams play a two-legged tie and the winners advance to the fifth stage. The losing teams qualified for the third phase of the revalida stage.

==== Fifth stage ====
Both tie winners will play a final match on neutral ground to decide the champion and first promoted team to Primera Nacional. The losing team qualified for the third phase of the revalida stage.

=== Revalida stages ===
The revalida stage is divided in several phases: First, the twenty teams that did not qualify for the championship stages were divided into two zones and it was played in a round-robin tournament whereby each team played each one of the other teams one time. The teams placed 1st to 6th from each zone advance too the second phase.

==== Second phase ====
The twelve teams from the first phase of revalida stage and the fourteen teams from the second and third stages of championship stages play a two-legged tie and the winners advance to the third phase.

==== Third to sixth phase ====
The thirteen teams from the second phase, the losing teams from the fourth and fifth stage of championship stages, play a torneo reducido, with teams seeded according to their previous results; playing a two-legged tie over the phases. The winner of the sixth phase is promoted to Primera Nacional.

=== Relegation ===
After the first phase of the revalida stage a table was drawn up with the points obtained in the first stage and the first phase of the revalida stage and the bottom two teams of each two zones were relegated to the Torneo Regional Federal Amateur, giving a total of four teams relegated.

== Club information ==
Locations of the 2026 season teams.
Yellow: Zone A; Blue: Zone B;
Green: Zone C; Red: Zone D.

=== Zone A ===
Team	City	Stadium
9 de Julio	Rafaela	Germán Solterman
Atlético Escobar	Ingeniero Maschwitz	Armenia
Defensores de Belgrano	Villa Ramallo	Salomón Boeseldín
Douglas Haig	Pergamino	Miguel Morales
El Linqueño	Lincoln	Leonardo Costa
Gimnasia y Esgrima	Chivilcoy	José María Paz
Gimnasia y Esgrima	Concepción del Uruguay	Manuel y Ramón Núñez
Independiente	Chivilcoy	Raúl Orlando Lungarzo
Sportivo Belgrano	San Francisco	Oscar Boero
Sportivo Las Parejas	Las Parejas	Fortaleza del Lobo

=== Zone B ===
Team	City	Stadium
Bartolomé Mitre	Posadas	Ernesto Tito Cucchiaroni
Boca Unidos	Corrientes	José Antonio Romero Feris
Defensores de Vilelas	Puerto Vilelas	Estadio Vilelas
Juventud Antoniana	Salta	Fray Honorato Pistoia
San Martín	Formosa	17 De Octubre
Sarmiento	La Banda	Ciudad de La Banda
Sarmiento	Resistencia	Centenario
Sol de América	Formosa	Sol de América
Tucumán Central	San Miguel de Tucumán	Estadio Tucumán Central

=== Zone C ===
Team	City	Stadium
Argentino	Monte Maíz	Modesto Marrone
Atenas	Río Cuarto	9 de Julio
Cipolletti	Cipolletti	La Visera de Cemento
Costa Brava	General Pico	Nuevo Pacaembú
Deportivo Rincón	Rincón de Los Sauces	Elías Moisés Gómez
FADEP	Russell	Predio Social y Deportivo FADEP
Huracán Las Heras	Las Heras	General San Martín
Juventud Unida Universitario	San Luis	Mario Diez
San Martín	San Martín	Libertador General San Martín

=== Zone D ===
Team	City	Stadium
Alvarado	Mar del Plata	Estadio José María Minella
Círculo Deportivo	Cdte. Nicanor Otamendi	Guillermo Trama
Germinal	Rawson	El Fortín
Guillermo Brown	Puerto Madryn	Raul Conti
Kimberley	Mar del Plata	José Alberto Valle
Olimpo	Bahía Blanca	Roberto Natalio Carminatti
Santamarina	Tandil	Municipal General San Martín
Sol de Mayo	Viedma	Sol de Mayo
Villa Mitre	Bahía Blanca	El Fortín

== First stage ==
=== Zone A ===
Pos	Team	Pld	W	D	L	GF	GA	GD	Pts	Qualification or Relegation
1	Douglas Haig	18	9	4	5	22	15	+7	31	Advance to Championship Stages
2	Sportivo Belgrano	18	7	9	2	21	9	+12	30	Advance to Championship Stages
3	Gimnasia y Esgrima (Ch)	18	7	6	5	17	12	+5	27	Advance to Championship Stages
4	Defensores de Belgrano (VR)	18	7	6	5	24	20	+4	27	Advance to Championship Stages
5	9 de Julio (R)	18	7	4	7	28	27	+1	25	Advance to Championship Stages
6	Sportivo Las Parejas	18	5	9	4	12	13	−1	24	Advance to Revalida Stages
7	Atlético Escobar	18	6	4	8	21	29	−8	22	Advance to Revalida Stages
8	Independiente (Ch)	18	4	7	7	15	22	−7	19	Advance to Revalida Stages
9	El Linqueño	18	5	4	9	14	21	−7	19	Advance to Revalida Stages
10	Gimnasia y Esgrima (CdU)	18	4	5	9	12	18	−6	17	Advance to Revalida Stages

Source: AFA
Rules for classification: 1) points; 2) goal difference; 3) Head-to-head points; 4) goals scored; 5) away goals scored; 6) draw of lots.

==== Results ====
Home \ Away	9JU	ATL	DEF	DOU	ELI	GCH	GYE	ICH	SPB	SLP
9 de Julio (R)		4–1	1–2	2–0	3–2	2–1	4–1	3–2	0–2	2–2
Atlético Escobar	2–0		3–2	2–1	1–0	0–2	2–1	0–0	1–3	1–1
Defensores de Belgrano (VR)	0–0	1–1		1–0	3–1	2–2	2–1	2–0	1–1	2–0
Douglas Haig	2–1	4–1	3–2		1–0	2–1	0–0	1–0	0–0	0–0
El Linqueño	0–3	2–1	0–2	2–0		1–1	0–0	2–1	1–1	1–0
Gimnasia y Esgrima (Ch)	1–0	2–0	3–0	2–0	1–0		0–0	0–0	0–0	1–0
Gimnasia y Esgrima (CdU)	3–0	1–2	1–0	1–3	0–1	1–0		0–1	1–0	0–1
Independiente (Ch)	2–2	2–1	1–1	0–4	1–0	3–0	0–0		0–3	1–1
Sportivo Belgrano	3–0	2–2	1–0	0–1	1–1	1–0	0–0	1–1		2–0
Sportivo Las Parejas	1–1	1–0	1–1	0–0	1–0	0–0	2–1	1–0	0–0	

Legend: Blue = home team win; Yellow = draw; Red = away team win.

=== Zone B ===
Pos	Team	Pld	W	D	L	GF	GA	GD	Pts	Qualification or Relegation
1	San Martín (F)	16	9	3	4	24	19	+5	30	Advance to Championship Stages
2	Bartolomé Mitre (P)	16	7	5	4	13	7	+6	26	Advance to Championship Stages
3	Sol de América (F)	16	8	2	6	19	14	+5	26	Advance to Championship Stages
4	Sarmiento (LB)	16	7	4	5	17	15	+2	25	Advance to Championship Stages
5	Juventud Antoniana	16	7	4	5	19	11	+8	25	Advance to Championship Stages
6	Defensores de Vilelas	16	6	1	9	21	26	−5	19	Advance to Revalida Stages
7	Boca Unidos	16	5	3	8	19	24	−5	18	Advance to Revalida Stages
8	Tucumán Central	16	5	2	9	14	19	−5	17	Advance to Revalida Stages
9	Sarmiento (R)	16	3	6	7	12	23	−11	15	Advance to Revalida Stages

Source: AFA
Rules for classification: 1) points; 2) goal difference; 3) Head-to-head points; 4) goals scored; 5) away goals scored; 6) draw of lots.

==== Results ====
Home \ Away	BAR	BOU	DVI	JUA	SAF	SLB	SAR	SOL	TUC
Bartolomé Mitre (P)		1–0	1–0	0–0	2–0	0–0	2–0	0–0	1–0
Boca Unidos	2–1		2–4	0–3	3–1	3–1	2–0	0–1	3–1
Defensores de Vilelas	1–3	2–0		0–1	2–3	3–0	2–2	2–1	1–0
Juventud Antoniana	1–2	0–0	4–0		0–3	0–1	2–0	2–1	3–1
San Martín (F)	1–0	1–1	2–1	0–0		4–2	3–0	1–0	3–2
Sarmiento (LB)	1–0	3–0	1–2	0–0	2–0		1–1	2–0	1–0
Sarmiento (R)	0–0	1–1	2–0	1–3	1–1	0–1		2–1	1–0
Sol de América (F)	0–0	3–1	2–1	1–0	1–2	1–0	3–0		3–0
Tucumán Central	1–0	2–0	2–0	1–0	2–0	1–1	1–1	0–1	

Legend: Blue = home team win; Yellow = draw; Red = away team win.

=== Zone C ===
Pos	Team	Pld	W	D	L	GF	GA	GD	Pts	Qualification or Relegation
1	Cipolletti	16	7	4	5	19	15	+4	25	Advance to Championship Stages
2	Argentino (MM)	16	5	8	3	16	12	+4	23	Advance to Championship Stages
3	Atenas (RC)	16	6	5	5	12	13	−1	23	Advance to Championship Stages
4	Huracán Las Heras	16	6	5	5	11	13	−2	23	Advance to Championship Stages
5	FADEP	16	4	9	3	17	14	+3	21	Advance to Revalida Stages
6	Deportivo Rincón	16	5	4	7	13	16	−3	19	Advance to Revalida Stages
7	San Martín (M)	16	4	7	5	11	15	−4	19	Advance to Revalida Stages
8	Costa Brava	16	4	6	6	12	13	−1	18	Advance to Revalida Stages
9	Juventud Unida Universitario	16	3	8	5	10	10	0	17	Advance to Revalida Stages

Source: AFA
Rules for classification: 1) points; 2) goal difference; 3) Head-to-head points; 4) goals scored; 5) away goals scored; 6) draw of lots.

==== Results ====
Home \ Away	ARG	ATE	CIP	CBR	DRI	FAD	HLH	JUU	SMA
Argentino (MM)		0–0	2–0	0–0	2–0	0–0	1–0	0–0	4–1
Atenas (RC)	1–0		3–1	1–1	3–1	1–3	0–0	0–0	0–0
Cipolletti	2–2	1–0		1–1	2–1	2–1	3–0	0–1	3–0
Costa Brava	2–0	0–1	1–0		0–1	3–0	1–2	1–1	2–1
Deportivo Rincón	2–0	0–1	1–2	1–0		0–0	0–1	2–1	1–0
FADEP	2–2	4–0	0–0	2–0	2–2		1–0	1–3	0–0
Huracán Las Heras	0–0	1–0	1–1	2–0	1–1	0–0		1–0	1–0
Juventud Unida Universitario	1–2	0–1	0–1	0–0	0–0	0–0	2–0		1–1
San Martín (M)	1–1	1–0	1–0	0–0	1–0	1–1	3–1	0–0	

Updated to match(es) played on unknown. Source:
Legend: Blue = home team win; Yellow = draw; Red = away team win.

=== Zone D ===
Pos	Team	Pld	W	D	L	GF	GA	GD	Pts	Qualification or Relegation
1	Olimpo	16	8	7	1	13	4	+9	31	Advance to Championship Stages
2	Alvarado	16	7	6	3	19	7	+12	27	Advance to Championship Stages
3	Kimberley	16	6	8	2	15	9	+6	26	Advance to Championship Stages
4	Villa Mitre	16	5	8	3	14	8	+6	23	Advance to Championship Stages
5	Germinal	16	4	6	6	7	14	−7	18	Advance to Revalida Stages
6	Sol de Mayo	16	4	6	6	15	18	−3	18	Advance to Revalida Stages
7	Guillermo Brown	16	4	5	7	13	20	−7	17	Advance to Revalida Stages
8	Santamarina	16	2	7	7	9	17	−8	13	Advance to Revalida Stages
9	Círculo Deportivo	16	2	7	7	8	16	−8	13	Advance to Revalida Stages

Source: AFA
Rules for classification: 1) points; 2) goal difference; 3) Head-to-head points; 4) goals scored; 5) away goals scored; 6) draw of lots.

==== Results ====
Home \ Away	ALV	CIR	GER	GBR	KIM	OLI	RSA	SDM	VMI
Alvarado		1–0	5–0	2–0	0–0	2–0	3–0	2–0	1–1
Círculo Deportivo	0–1		2–1	1–1	0–1	1–1	0–0	3–1	0–0
Germinal	1–0	0–0		1–1	0–0	0–1	1–0	1–0	1–0
Guillermo Brown	0–0	1–0	2–0		3–4	0–2	2–2	0–1	1–0
Kimberley	2–2	1–1	1–0	3–0		0–1	0–0	0–0	1–0
Olimpo	2–0	1–0	1–0	0–0	0–0		2–0	1–0	0–0
Santamarina	0–0	4–0	0–0	0–2	1–0	0–0		0–2	0–2
Sol de Mayo	0–0	0–0	1–1	1–0	1–2	1–1	3–2		3–3
Villa Mitre	1–0	2–0	0–0	3–0	0–0	0–0	0–0	2–1	

Legend: Blue = home team win; Yellow = draw; Red = away team win.

=== Ranking of third-placed teams ===
Pos	Grp	Team	Pld	W	D	L	GF	GA	GD	Pts	Qualification
1	B	Juventud Antoniana	16	7	4	5	19	11	+8	25	Advance to Championship Stages
2	C	FADEP	16	4	9	3	17	14	+3	21	
3	D	Germinal	16	4	6	6	7	15	−8	18	

Rules for classification: 1) points; 2) goal difference; 3) goal scored; 4) away goals scored; 5) draw of lots.

== Championship Stages ==
=== Second stage ===
==== Zone A ====
Pos	Team	Pld	W	D	L	GF	GA	GD	Pts	Qualification or Relegation
1	San Martín (F)	8	5	2	1	14	5	+9	17	Advance to Third stage of Championship Stages and qualification for Copa Argentina
2	Gimnasia y Esgrima (Ch)	8	4	3	1	6	2	+4	15	Advance to Third stage of Championship Stages and qualification for Copa Argentina
3	Sol de América (F)	8	4	2	2	9	7	+2	14	Advance to Third stage of Championship Stages and qualification for Copa Argentina
4	Defensores de Belgrano (VR)	8	4	1	3	6	3	+3	13	Advance to Third stage of Championship Stages and qualification for Copa Argentina
5	Douglas Haig	8	3	3	2	12	7	+5	12	Advance to Second phase of Revalida Stages and qualification for Copa Argentina
6	9 de Julio (R)	8	3	3	2	9	6	+3	12	Advance to Second phase of Revalida Stages
7	Bartolomé Mitre (P)	8	1	2	5	3	10	−7	5	Advance to Second phase of Revalida Stages
8	Sarmiento (LB)	8	1	2	5	6	14	−8	5	Advance to Second phase of Revalida Stages
9	Sportivo Belgrano	8	1	2	5	3	14	−11	5	Advance to Second phase of Revalida Stages

Source: AFA
Rules for classification: 1) points; 2) goal difference; 3) goals scored; 4) away goals scored; 5) draw of lots.

===== Results =====
Home \ Away	9JU	BAR	DEF	DOU	GCH	SAF	SLB	SOL	SPB
9 de Julio (R)		0–1	1–0	0–0	1–0				
Bartolomé Mitre (P)				0–3	0–1	0–0	1–1		
Defensores de Belgrano (VR)		1–0		0–0	0–1	1–0			
Douglas Haig					0–0	1–4	3–1	1–2	
Gimnasia y Esgrima (Ch)						1–1	1–0	2–0	0–0
San Martín (F)	2–1						3–0	2–1	2–0
Sarmiento (LB)	1–4		0–2					0–0	3–0
Sol de América (F)	1–1	2–1	1–0						2–0
Sportivo Belgrano	1–1	2–0	0–2	0–4					

Legend: Blue = home team win; Yellow = draw; Red = away team win.

==== Zone B ====
Pos	Team	Pld	W	D	L	GF	GA	GD	Pts	Qualification or Relegation
1	Alvarado	8	4	3	1	10	5	+5	15	Advance to Third stage of Championship Stages and qualification for Copa Argentina
2	Cipolletti	8	4	3	1	10	7	+3	15	Advance to Third stage of Championship Stages and qualification for Copa Argentina
3	Olimpo	8	3	4	1	7	4	+3	13	Advance to Third stage of Championship Stages and qualification for Copa Argentina
4	Atenas (RC)	8	4	1	3	12	10	+2	13	Advance to Third stage of Championship Stages and qualification for Copa Argentina
5	Kimberley	8	3	2	3	8	6	+2	11	Advance to Second phase of Revalida Stages and qualification for Copa Argentina
6	Argentino (MM)	8	3	2	3	7	7	0	11	Advance to Second phase of Revalida Stages
7	Villa Mitre	8	2	4	2	5	4	+1	10	Advance to Second phase of Revalida Stages
8	Huracán Las Heras	8	2	1	5	3	8	−5	7	Advance to Second phase of Revalida Stages
9	Juventud Antoniana	8	0	2	6	1	12	−11	2	Advance to Second phase of Revalida Stages

Source: AFA
Rules for classification: 1) points; 2) goal difference; 3) goals scored; 4) away goals scored; 5) draw of lots.

===== Results =====
Home \ Away	ALV	ARG	ATE	CIP	HLH	JUA	KIM	OLI	VMI
Alvarado		1–1	3–2		1–0			1–1	
Argentino (MM)			1–2			1–0		1–1	1–0
Atenas (RC)						3–1	2–1	1–0	0–1
Cipolletti	1–0	1–0	2–2		1–0				
Huracán Las Heras		1–2	1–0			1–0		0–1	
Juventud Antoniana	0–2			0–2			0–3		0–0
Kimberley	0–2	1–0		3–1	0–0				
Olimpo				1–1		0–0	1–0		2–0
Villa Mitre	0–0			1–1	3–0		0–0		

Legend: Blue = home team win; Yellow = draw; Red = away team win.

=== Third to fifth stage ===
Third stage
1A	San Martín (F)	1	1	2
4B	Atenas (RC)	0	1	1
2A	Gimnasia y Esgrima (Ch)	1	1	2
3B	Olimpo	2	2	4
1B	Alvarado	2	2	4
4A	Defensores de Belgrano (VR)	2	0	2
2B	Cipolletti	0	6	6
3A	Sol de América (F)	1	1	2

Fourth stage
1A	San Martín (F)	1	2	3
3B	Olimpo	1	0	1
1B	Alvarado	0	0	0
2B	Cipolletti	1	0	1

Fifth stage
1A	San Martín (F)	2
2B	Cipolletti	0

- Note: In the Third and Fourth stage, the team in the first line plays at home the second leg. The fifth stage is played on neutral ground.

=== Fifth stage ===
October 25, 2026	Cipolletti	0–2	San Martín (F)	San Francisco, Pcia. de Córdoba
15:00 UTC−3			Tapia 43'; Leiva 57'	Stadium: Oscar Boero; Referee: Matías Billone

San Martín (F) is promoted to Primera Nacional.

== Revalida Stages ==
=== First phase ===
==== Zone A ====
Pos	Team	Pld	W	D	L	GF	GA	GD	Pts	Qualification or Relegation
1	Boca Unidos	8	4	3	1	14	7	+7	15	Advance to Second phase of Revalida Stages
2	Gimnasia y Esgrima (CdU)	8	4	2	2	9	2	+7	14	Advance to Second phase of Revalida Stages
3	El Linqueño	8	3	4	1	8	4	+4	13	Advance to Second phase of Revalida Stages
4	Sportivo Las Parejas	8	3	3	2	8	3	+5	12	Advance to Second phase of Revalida Stages
5	Defensores de Vilelas	8	3	3	2	14	11	+3	12	Advance to Second phase of Revalida Stages
6	Independiente (Ch)	8	3	3	2	8	5	+3	12	
7	Atlético Escobar	8	3	2	3	7	12	−5	11	
8	Sarmiento (R)	8	2	0	6	5	16	−11	6	
9	Tucumán Central	8	0	2	6	8	21	−13	2	

Updated to match(es) played on September 13. Source: AFA
Rules for classification: 1) points; 2) goal difference; 3) goals scored; 4) away goals scored; 5) draw of lots.

===== Results =====
Home \ Away	ATL	BOU	DVI	ELI	GYE	ICH	SAR	SLP	TUC
Atlético Escobar		0–3	2–1		0–2			0–0	
Boca Unidos			3–3		1–0	1–1		1–0	
Defensores de Vilelas				0–0		2–0	4–1		4–3
El Linqueño	1–1	1–0			0–0			2–0	
Gimnasia y Esgrima (CdU)			2–0			0–0	1–0		4–0
Independiente (Ch)	3–0			1–0			1–2		2–0
Sarmiento (R)	0–1	0–3		1–3					1–0
Sportivo Las Parejas			0–0		1–0	0–0	3–0		
Tucumán Central	2–3	2–2		1–1				0–4	

Legend: Blue = home team win; Yellow = draw; Red = away team win.

==== Zone B ====
Pos	Team	Pld	W	D	L	GF	GA	GD	Pts	Qualification or Relegation
1	Costa Brava	9	4	4	1	11	7	+4	16	Advance to Second phase of Revalida Stages
2	San Martín (M)	9	4	4	1	9	6	+3	16	Advance to Second phase of Revalida Stages
3	Deportivo Rincón	9	4	3	2	11	5	+6	15	Advance to Second phase of Revalida Stages
4	FADEP	9	4	3	2	7	4	+3	15	Advance to Second phase of Revalida Stages
5	Juventud Unida Universitario	9	4	2	3	7	6	+1	14	Advance to Second phase of Revalida Stages
6	Germinal	9	3	4	2	10	7	+3	13	
7	Círculo Deportivo	9	3	2	4	6	7	−1	11	
8	Guillermo Brown	9	3	2	4	6	7	−1	11	
9	Sol de Mayo	9	2	0	7	6	14	−8	6	
10	Santamarina	9	2	0	7	6	16	−10	6	

Updated to match(es) played on September 13. Source: AFA
Rules for classification: 1) points; 2) goal difference; 3) goals scored; 4) away goals scored; 5) draw of lots.

===== Results =====
Home \ Away	CIR	CBR	DRI	FAD	GER	GBR	JUU	RSA	SMA	SDM
Círculo Deportivo		0–1			2–0	1–0				2–1
Costa Brava					1–1	1–0	1–2			1–0
Deportivo Rincón	0–0	1–1				2–0	1–0	3–0		
FADEP	1–0	0–0	1–0		1–1					2–0
Germinal			0–0			1–0	2–1	5–1	0–0	
Guillermo Brown				0–0			2–1	1–0	1–1	
Juventud Unida Universitario	0–0			1–0				1–0	0–0	
Santamarina	2–1	1–3		2–0					0–1	
San Martín (M)	2–0	2–2	1–0	0–2						2–1
Sol de Mayo			2–4		1–0	0–2	0–1	1–0		

Legend: Blue = home team win; Yellow = draw; Red = away team win.

=== Second phase ===
Pos	Grp	Team	Pld	W	D	L	GF	GA	GD	Pts	Qualification
1	2º A	Gimnasia y Esgrima (Ch)	8	4	3	1	6	2	+4	15	Qualified from Third stage of Championship Stages
2	3º A	Sol de América (F)	8	4	2	2	9	7	+2	14	Qualified from Third stage of Championship Stages
3	4º A	Defensores de Belgrano (VR)	8	4	1	3	6	3	+3	13	Qualified from Third stage of Championship Stages
4	4º B	Atenas (RC)	8	4	1	3	12	10	+2	13	Qualified from Third stage of Championship Stages
5	5º A	Douglas Haig	8	3	3	2	12	7	+5	12	Qualified from Second stage of Championship Stages
6	5º B	Kimberley	8	3	2	3	8	6	+2	11	Qualified from Second stage of Championship Stages
7	6º A	9 de Julio (R)	8	3	3	2	9	6	+3	12	Qualified from Second stage of Championship Stages
8	6º B	Argentino (MM)	8	3	2	3	7	7	0	11	Qualified from Second stage of Championship Stages
9	7º B	Villa Mitre	8	2	4	2	5	4	+1	10	Qualified from Second stage of Championship Stages
10	7º A	Bartolomé Mitre (P)	8	1	2	5	3	10	−7	5	Qualified from Second stage of Championship Stages
11	8º B	Huracán Las Heras	8	2	1	5	3	8	−5	7	Qualified from Second stage of Championship Stages
12	8º A	Sarmiento (LB)	8	1	2	5	6	14	−8	5	Qualified from Second stage of Championship Stages
13	9º A	Sportivo Belgrano	8	1	2	5	3	14	−11	5	Qualified from Second stage of Championship Stages
14	9º B	Juventud Antoniana	8	0	2	6	1	12	−11	2	Qualified from Second stage of Championship Stages
15	1º B	Costa Brava	9	4	4	1	11	7	+4	16	Qualified from First phase of Revalida Stages
16	1º A	Boca Unidos	8	4	3	1	14	7	+7	15	Qualified from First phase of Revalida Stages
17	2º B	San Martín (M)	9	4	4	1	9	6	+3	16	Qualified from First phase of Revalida Stages
18	2º A	Gimnasia y Esgrima (CdU)	8	4	2	2	9	2	+7	14	Qualified from First phase of Revalida Stages
19	3º B	Deportivo Rincón	9	4	3	2	11	5	+6	15	Qualified from First phase of Revalida Stages
20	3º A	El Linqueño	8	3	4	1	8	4	+4	13	Qualified from First phase of Revalida Stages
21	4º B	FADEP	9	4	3	2	7	4	+3	15	Qualified from First phase of Revalida Stages
22	4º A	Sportivo Las Parejas	8	3	3	2	8	3	+5	12	Qualified from First phase of Revalida Stages
23	5º B	Juventud Unida Universitario	9	4	2	3	7	6	+1	14	Qualified from First phase of Revalida Stages
24	5º A	Defensores de Vilelas	8	3	3	2	14	11	+3	12	Qualified from First phase of Revalida Stages

Source: AFA
Rules for classification: 1) Points per game; 2) Performance in previous stage; 3) Goal difference; 4) goals scored; 5) Drawing of lots.

Team 1	Agg.	Team 2	1st leg	2nd leg
Gimnasia y Esgrima (Ch) (bsr)	4–4	Defensores de Vilelas	1–1	3–3
Sol de América (F) (bsr)	2–2	Juventud Unida Universitario	0–0	2–2
Defensores de Belgrano (VR)	1–2	Sportivo Las Parejas	1–1	0–1
Atenas (RC) (bsr)	3–3	FADEP	0–2	3–1
Douglas Haig	1–0	El Linqueño	0–0	1–0
Kimberley	3–1	Deportivo Rincón	1–0	2–1
9 de Julio (R)	2–4	Gimnasia y Esgrima (CdU)	1–4	1–0
Argentino (MM)	4–1	San Martín (M)	2–0	2–1
Villa Mitre	3–1	Costa Brava	1–1	2–0
Bartolomé Mitre (P)	0–2	Boca Unidos	0–1	0–1
Huracán Las Heras	1–3	Juventud Antoniana	0–3	1–0
Sarmiento (LB) (bsr)	1–1	Sportivo Belgrano	1–1	0–0

=== Third phase ===
Pos	Grp	Team	Pld	W	D	L	GF	GA	GD	Pts	Qualification
1	SF	Alvarado	8	4	3	1	10	5	+5	15	Losing semifinalists from Fourth stage of Championship Stages
2	SF	Olimpo	8	3	4	1	7	4	+3	13	Losing semifinalists from Fourth stage of Championship Stages
3	2º A	Gimnasia y Esgrima (Ch)	8	4	3	1	6	2	+4	15	Qualified from Second stage of Championship Stages
4	3º A	Sol de América (F)	8	4	2	2	9	7	+2	14	Qualified from Second stage of Championship Stages
5	4º B	Atenas (RC)	8	4	1	3	12	10	+2	13	Qualified from Second stage of Championship Stages
6	5º A	Douglas Haig	8	3	3	2	12	7	+5	12	Qualified from Second stage of Championship Stages
7	5º B	Kimberley	8	3	2	3	8	6	+2	11	Qualified from Second stage of Championship Stages
8	6º B	Argentino (MM)	8	3	2	3	7	7	0	11	Qualified from Second stage of Championship Stages
9	7º B	Villa Mitre	8	2	4	2	5	4	+1	10	Qualified from Second stage of Championship Stages
10	8º A	Sarmiento (LB)	8	1	2	5	6	14	−8	5	Qualified from Second stage of Championship Stages
11	9º B	Juventud Antoniana	8	0	2	6	1	12	−11	2	Qualified from Second stage of Championship Stages
12	1º A	Boca Unidos	8	4	3	1	14	7	+7	15	Qualified from First phase of Revalida Stages
13	2º A	Gimnasia y Esgrima (CdU)	8	4	2	2	9	2	+7	14	Qualified from First phase of Revalida Stages
14	4º A	Sportivo Las Parejas	8	3	3	2	8	3	+5	12	Qualified from First phase of Revalida Stages

Source: AFA
Rules for classification: 1) Points per game; 2) Performance in previous stage; 3) Goal difference; 4) goals scored; 5) Drawing of lots.

Team 1	Agg.	Team 2	1st leg	2nd leg
Alvarado (bsr)	2–2	Sportivo Las Parejas	1–0	1–2
Olimpo	1–0	Gimnasia y Esgrima (CdU)	0–0	1–0
Gimnasia y Esgrima (Ch)	w/o	Boca Unidos	–	–
Sol de América (F)	2–3	Juventud Antoniana	0–3	2–0
Atenas (RC)	4–5	Sarmiento (LB)	0–3	4–2
Douglas Haig	3–1	Villa Mitre	0–1	3–0
Kimberley (bsr)	1–1	Argentino (MM)	0–0	1–1

=== Fourth phase ===
Pos	Grp	Team	Pld	W	D	L	GF	GA	GD	Pts	Qualification
1	F	Cipolletti	8	4	3	1	10	7	+3	15	Losing finalist from Fifth stage of Championship Stages
2	SF	Alvarado	8	4	3	1	10	5	+5	15	Losing semifinalists from Fourth stage of Championship Stages
3	SF	Olimpo	8	3	4	1	7	4	+3	13	Losing semifinalists from Fourth stage of Championship Stages
4	2º A	Gimnasia y Esgrima (Ch)	8	4	3	1	6	2	+4	15	Qualified from Second stage of Championship Stages
5	5º A	Douglas Haig	8	3	3	2	12	7	+5	12	Qualified from Second stage of Championship Stages
6	5º B	Kimberley	8	3	2	3	8	6	+2	11	Qualified from Second stage of Championship Stages
7	8º A	Sarmiento (LB)	8	1	2	5	6	14	−8	5	Qualified from Second stage of Championship Stages
8	9º B	Juventud Antoniana	8	0	2	6	1	12	−11	2	Qualified from Second stage of Championship Stages

Source: AFA
Rules for classification: 1) Points per game; 2) Performance in previous stage; 3) Goal difference; 4) goals scored; 5) Drawing of lots.

Team 1	Agg.	Team 2	1st leg	2nd leg
Cipolletti	4–0	Juventud Antoniana	1–0	3–0
Alvarado	0–1	Sarmiento (LB)	0–1	0–0
Olimpo (bsr)	2–2	Kimberley	1–1	1–1
Gimnasia y Esgrima (Ch)	2–3	Douglas Haig	0–1	2–2

=== Fifth phase ===
Pos	Grp	Team	Pld	W	D	L	GF	GA	GD	Pts	Qualification
1	F	Cipolletti	8	4	3	1	10	7	+3	15	Losing finalist from Fifth stage of Championship Stages
2	SF	Olimpo	8	3	4	1	7	4	+3	13	Losing semifinalists from Fourth stage of Championship Stages
3	5º A	Douglas Haig	8	3	3	2	12	7	+5	12	Qualified from Second stage of Championship Stages
4	8º A	Sarmiento (LB)	8	1	2	5	6	14	−8	5	Qualified from Second stage of Championship Stages

Source: AFA
Rules for classification: 1) Points per game; 2) Performance in previous stage; 3) Goal difference; 4) goals scored; 5) Drawing of lots.

Team 1	Agg.	Team 2	1st leg	2nd leg
Cipolletti	–	Sarmiento (LB)	–	–
Olimpo	–	Douglas Haig	–	–

== Relegation ==
=== Zone A ===
Pos	Team	First Stage Pts	Reválida Stage Pts	Total Pts	Total Pld	Avg	Relegation
1	Sportivo Las Parejas	24	12	36	26	1.385	
2	Boca Unidos	18	15	33	24	1.375	
3	Defensores de Vilelas	19	12	31	24	1.292	
4	Atlético Escobar	22	11	33	26	1.269	
5	El Linqueño	19	13	32	26	1.231	
6	Gimnasia y Esgrima (CdU)	17	14	31	26	1.192	
7	Independiente (Ch)	19	12	31	26	1.192	
8	Sarmiento (R)	15	6	21	24	0.875	Torneo Argentino del Interior
9	Tucumán Central	17	2	19	24	0.792	Torneo Argentino del Interior

=== Zone B ===
Pos	Team	First Stage Pts	Reválida Stages Pts	Total Pld	Total Pts	Relegation
1	FADEP	21	15	25	36	
2	San Martín (M)	19	16	25	35	
3	Deportivo Rincón	19	15	25	34	
4	Costa Brava	18	16	25	34	
5	Germinal	18	13	25	31	
6	Juventud Unida Universitario	17	14	25	31	
7	Guillermo Brown	17	11	25	28	
8	Sol de Mayo	18	6	25	24	Torneo Argentino del Interior relegation play-off
9	Círculo Deportivo	13	11	25	24	Torneo Argentino del Interior relegation play-off
10	Santamarina	13	6	25	19	Torneo Argentino del Interior

==== Relegation play-off ====
September 27, 2026	Sol de Mayo	1–1 (a.e.t.) (0–2 p)	Círculo Deportivo	Bahía Blanca, Pcia. de Buenos Aires
11:00 UTC−3	Barberini 7'		Morales 70'	Stadium: El Fortín; Referee: José Sandoval
	Penalties
	Valdebenito (penalty missed); Pérez (penalty missed); Giménez (penalty missed); Dietz (penalty missed)		(penalty missed) Barberini; (penalty scored) Martínez; (penalty scored) Grahl

== See also ==
- 2026 Argentine Primera División
- 2026 Primera Nacional
- 2026 Primera B Metropolitana
- 2026 Copa Argentina
