= Miguel Conicelli =

Argentine professional footballer

Personal information
- Full name: Miguel Ángel Conicelli
- Date of birth: 21 January 1995 (age 31)
- Place of birth: Hurlingham, Argentina
- Height: 1.76 m (5 ft 9 in)
- Position: Central midfielder

Youth career
- Deportivo Villa
- Platense
- Kimberley
- Platense

Senior career*
| Years | Team | Apps | (Gls) |
| 2014–2018 | Platense | 12 | (0) |
| 2018–2019 | Colegiales | 7 | (0) |
- * Club domestic league appearances and goals

Miguel Ángel Conicelli (born 21 January 1995) is an Argentine professional footballer who plays as a central midfielder.

== Career ==
Conicelli started in the youth set-up of local team Deportivo Villa, before signing for Platense's academy; which was split into two stints due to a short spell with Kimberley. His first appearance in senior football came in a Primera B Metropolitana win away to Deportivo Armenio on 6 November 2014. Eleven appearances followed for the club across four seasons, two of which came in the 2017–18 campaign which Platense ended with promotion as champions to Primera B Nacional. In June 2018, Conicelli remained in the third tier after agreeing to a move to Colegiales. He was sent off during his second match against UAI Urquiza on 29 August.

== Career statistics ==
As of 30 December 2020.

Appearances and goals by club, season and competition
| Club | Season | League | | | Cup | | League Cup | | Continental | | Other | | Total | |
| Club | Season | Division | Apps | Goals | Apps | Goals | Apps | Goals | Apps | Goals | Apps | Goals | Apps | Goals |
|---|---|---|---|---|---|---|---|---|---|---|---|---|---|---|
| Platense | 2014 | Primera B Metropolitana | 1 | 0 | 0 | 0 | — | | — | | 0 | 0 | 1 | 0 |
| Platense | 2015 | Primera B Metropolitana | 0 | 0 | 0 | 0 | — | | — | | 0 | 0 | 0 | 0 |
| Platense | 2016 | Primera B Metropolitana | 2 | 0 | 0 | 0 | — | | — | | 0 | 0 | 2 | 0 |
| Platense | 2016–17 | Primera B Metropolitana | 7 | 0 | 0 | 0 | — | | — | | 0 | 0 | 7 | 0 |
| Platense | 2017–18 | Primera B Metropolitana | 2 | 0 | 0 | 0 | — | | — | | 0 | 0 | 2 | 0 |
| Platense | Total | | 12 | 0 | 0 | 0 | — | | — | | 0 | 0 | 12 | 0 |
| Colegiales | 2018–19 | Primera B Metropolitana | 7 | 0 | 0 | 0 | — | | — | | 0 | 0 | 7 | 0 |
| Career total | | | 19 | 0 | 0 | 0 | — | | — | | 0 | 0 | 19 | 0 |

== Honours ==
Platense

- Primera B Metropolitana: 2017–18
