= Matías Vargas =

Matías Vargas may refer to:

- Matías Vargas (footballer, born 1996), Argentine forward
- Matías Vargas (footballer, born 1997), Argentine midfielder
