= 2027 Copa Argentina =

Tournament details
- Country: Argentina
- Teams: 64

The 2027 Copa Argentina (officially the Copa Argentina AXION energy 2027 for sponsorship reasons) will be the seventeenth edition of the Copa Argentina, and the fifteenth since the relaunch of the tournament in 2011. The competition will begin in January and will end in December 2027. TBD are the defending champions.

The champions will qualify for the 2028 Copa Libertadores and 2027 Supercopa Argentina.

== Teams ==
The 64 teams that take part in this competition include: all thirty teams from the Primera División; fifteen teams of the Primera Nacional; five from the Primera B, four from the Primera C, and ten teams from Federal A.

=== First Level ===
==== Primera División ====
All thirty teams of the 2026 tournament qualified.

- Aldosivi
- Argentinos Juniors
- Atlético Tucumán
- Banfield
- Barracas Central
- Belgrano
- Boca Juniors
- Central Córdoba (SdE)
- Defensa y Justicia
- Deportivo Riestra
- Estudiantes (LP)
- Estudiantes (RC)
- Gimnasia y Esgrima (LP)
- Gimnasia y Esgrima (M)
- Huracán
- Independiente
- Independiente Rivadavia
- Instituto
- Lanús
- Newell's Old Boys
- Platense
- Racing
- River Plate
- Rosario Central
- San Lorenzo
- Sarmiento (J)
- Talleres (C)
- Tigre
- Unión
- Vélez Sarsfield

=== Second Level ===
==== Primera Nacional ====
The top 7 teams in each group plus the best eighth-placed one of the 2026 tournament qualified.

- Almirante Brown
- Atlanta
- Ciudad de Bolívar
- Colegiales
- Colón
- Deportivo Madryn
- Deportivo Maipú
- Deportivo Morón
- Ferrocarril Midland
- Ferro Carril Oeste
- Gimnasia y Esgrima (J)
- Gimnasia y Tiro
- Godoy Cruz
- Temperley
- Tristán Suárez

=== Third Level ===
==== Primera B Metropolitana ====
The champions, the winners of the "Torneo Reducido" and the top three teams of the 2026 Primera B tournament qualified.

- Arsenal
- Excursionistas
- Sportivo Italiano
- Talleres (RdE)

==== Torneo Federal A ====
The top five teams of each zone from the Second Stage of the 2026 tournament qualified.

- Alvarado
- Atenas (RC)
- Cipolletti
- Defensores de Belgrano (VR)
- Douglas Haig
- Gimnasia y Esgrima (Ch)
- Kimberley
- Olimpo
- San Martín (F)
- Sol de América (F)

=== Fourth Level ===
==== Primera C Metropolitana ====
The champions, the winners of the "Torneo Reducido" and the best other teams of each zone of the 2026 Primera C tournament qualified.

- Berazategui
- Cañuelas
- Luján

== Round and draw dates ==
| Phase | Round | Draw date | Dates |
|---|---|---|---|
| Final stage | Round of 64 | TBD December 2026 | TBD 2027 |
| Final stage | Round of 32 | TBD December 2026 | TBD 2027 |
| Final stage | Round of 16 | TBD December 2026 | TBD 2027 |
| Final stage | Quarterfinals | TBD December 2026 | TBD 2027 |
| Final stage | Semifinals | TBD December 2026 | TBD 2027 |
| Final stage | Final | TBD December 2026 | TBD 2027 |

== Final rounds ==
=== Draw ===
The draw for the finals rounds was held on TBD December 2026, 13:00 at the AFA Futsal Stadium in Ezeiza.

=== Bracket ===
==== Upper bracket ====
Round of 64

Round of 32

Round of 16

Quarterfinals

Semifinals

==== Lower bracket ====
Round of 64

Round of 32

Round of 16

Quarterfinals

Semifinals

=== Round of 64 ===
The Round of 64 had 10 qualified teams from the Torneo Federal A, 9 qualified teams from the Metropolitan Zone (5 teams from Primera B Metropolitana and 4 teams from Primera C Metropolitana), 15 teams from Primera Nacional and 30 teams from Primera División. The round was played in a single knock-out match format between TBD and TBD. The 32 winning teams advanced to the Round of 32.

| 1 |

| 2 |

| 3 |

| 4 |

| 5 |

| 6 |

| 7 |

| 8 |

| 9 |

| 10 |

| 11 |

| 12 |

| 13 |

| 14 |

| 15 |

| 16 |

| 17 |

| 18 |

| 19 |

| 20 |

| 21 |

| 22 |

| 23 |

| 24 |

| 25 |

| 26 |

| 27 |

| 28 |

| 29 |

| 30 |

| 31 |

| 32 |

=== Round of 32 ===
This round had 32 qualified teams from the Round of 64. It was played between TBD and TBD in a single knock-out match format. The 16 winning teams advanced to the Round of 16.

| 1 |

| 2 |

| 3 |

| 4 |

| 5 |

| 6 |

| 7 |

| 8 |

| 9 |

| 10 |

| 11 |

| 12 |

| 13 |

| 14 |

| 15 |

| 16 |

=== Round of 16 ===
This round had 16 qualified teams from the Round of 32. It was played between TBD and TBD in a single knock-out match format. The 8 winning teams advanced to the quarterfinals.

| 1 |

| 2 |

| 3 |

| 4 |

| 5 |

| 6 |

| 7 |

| 8 |

=== Quarterfinals ===
This round had 8 qualified teams from the Round of 16. The round was played between TBD and TBD, in a single knock-out match format. The 4 winning teams advanced to the semifinals.

| 1 |

| 2 |

| 3 |

| 4 |

=== Semifinals ===
This round will have 4 qualified teams from the quarterfinals. The round will be played on TBD and TBD, in a single knock-out match format. The 2 winning teams will advance to the final.

| 1 |

| 2 |

=== Final ===
| Winners 61 | 1 | Winners 62 |

== Top goalscorers ==
As of TBD

| Rank | Player | Club | Goals |
|---|---|---|---|
| 1 | | | |

Source: Copa Argentina

== See also ==
- 2027 AFA Liga Profesional de Fútbol
