= Maximiliano Álvarez =

Argentine footballer

Personal information
- Full name: Maximiliano Fabian Álvarez
- Date of birth: 6 February 1982 (age 44)
- Place of birth: Rosario, Santa Fe, Argentina
- Height: 1.91 m (6 ft 3 in)
- Position: Forward

Youth career
- –2004: Atletico Mexiquense

Senior career*
Years	Team	Apps	(Gls)
2005	Córdoba de Rosario	8	(2)
2006	Deportivo Italia	0	(0)
2006–2007	Llaneros	28	(8)
2008	Persipura Jayapura		
2008–2009	Chirag United		
2009	Concepción	16	(6)
2010	Centro Italo	5	(1)
2010	Città di Marino		
2011	Potosí	10	(2)
2011–2012	Córdoba de Santiago	8	(1)
2012–2013	Huracán de San Rafael	22	(10)
2013–2014	San Martín	15	(4)
2015	Belgrano de Esquel	3	(2)
2017	Andino Sport Club	13	(0)
- * Club domestic league appearances and goals

Maximiliano Fabian Álvarez (born 6 February 1982) is an Argentine former professional footballer who plays as a forward.

== Career statistics ==
Club	Season	League			Cup		Continental		Other		Total	
Club	Season	Division	Apps	Goals	Apps	Goals	Apps	Goals	Apps	Goals	Apps	Goals
Potosí	2011	Liga de Fútbol Profesional Boliviano	10	2	0	0	–		0	0	10	2
Córdoba de Santiago	2011–12	Torneo Argentino A	8	1	0	0	–		0	0	8	1
Career total			18	3	0	0	0	0	0	0	18	3
