= Brian Orosco =

Argentine footballer

Personal information
- Full name: Brian Ezequiel Orosco
- Date of birth: 28 February 1998 (age 28)
- Place of birth: Mendoza, Argentina
- Height: 1.72 m (5 ft 8 in)
- Position: Attacking midfielder

Team information
- Current team: Godoy Cruz

Youth career
- CAI

Senior career*
Years	Team	Apps	(Gls)
2015–2018	CAI	36	(5)
2018–2019	Guillermo Brown	0	(0)
2019	CAI		
2019–2020	Villa Dálmine	15	(3)
2020–2021	Asteras Tripolis	2	(0)
2021	Deportivo Morón	15	(2)
2022–2026	Estudiantes	5	(0)
2023	→ Deportivo Morón (loan)	29	(3)
2024	→ Riga FC (loan)	24	(4)
2025	→ Estudiantes RC (loan)	25	(2)
2026–	Godoy Cruz	3	(0)
- * Club domestic league appearances and goals as of 19:03, 18 March 2026 (UTC)

Brian Ezequiel Orosco (born 28 February 1998) is an Argentine professional footballer who plays as a midfielder for Godoy Cruz.

== Career ==
CAI gave Orosco his start in senior football. A 2–0 defeat to Cipolletti on 21 June 2015 saw Orosco make his senior bow in Torneo Federal A, coming on as a substitute in place of Matías Vargas in the first of six appearances in the 2015 campaign. That ended with relegation to Torneo Federal B, tier four, where he would score five goals in thirty matches across three years. June 2018 saw Primera B Nacional's Guillermo Brown sign Orosco. He made his debut in the Copa Argentina on 20 July during a narrow loss to Tigre of the Primera División. Orosco left Guillermo Brown in January 2019, subsequently moving back to tier four CAI.

On 18 July 2019, Orosco returned to Primera B Nacional after agreeing a move to Villa Dálmine.

Almost a year later, in June 2020, it was widely reported that Orosco was close to joining Super League Greece side Asteras Tripolis.

In the 2021 season he played for Deportivo Morón.

In February 2022 he signed for Estudiantes de La Plata.

On 4 January 2024, he was loaned out to Latvian Higher League club Riga FC.

== Career statistics ==
As of 12 January 2024.

Club statistics
Club	Season	League			Cup		League Cup		Continental		Other		Total	
Club	Season	Division	Apps	Goals	Apps	Goals	Apps	Goals	Apps	Goals	Apps	Goals	Apps	Goals
CAI	2015	Torneo Federal A	6	0	0	0	—		—		0	0	6	0
Guillermo Brown	2018–19	Primera B Nacional	0	0	1	0	—		—		0	0	1	0
Villa Dálmine	2019–20	Primera B Nacional	15	3	0	0	—		—		0	0	15	3
Asteras Trípoli	2020–21	Super League Greece	2	0	0	0	—		—		0	0	2	0
Deportivo Morón	2021	Primera B Nacional	15	2	0	0	—		—		0	0	15	2
Estudiantes de La Plata	2022	Argentine Primera División	5	0	2	1	6	1	4	0	0	0	17	2
Deportivo Morón (loan)	2023	Primera B Nacional	29	3	1	0	—		—		0	0	30	1
Career total			72	8	4	1	6	1	4	0	0	0	86	8
