= Marcos Enrique =

Argentine professional footballer

Personal information
- Full name: Marcos Nahuel Enrique
- Date of birth: 30 December 1999 (age 26)
- Place of birth: Franck, Argentina
- Height: 1.78 m (5 ft 10 in)
- Position: Central midfielder

Team information
- Current team: Patronato

Youth career
- Atlético Franck
- Santa Fe FC
- 2013–2020: Vélez Sarsfield

Senior career*
Years	Team	Apps	(Gls)
2020–2024	Vélez Sarsfield	0	(0)
2021	→ Instituto (loan)	9	(0)
2021–2022	→ Cerro Largo (loan)	32	(0)
2023	→ Almirante Brown (loan)	36	(2)
2024–2025	Quilmes	40	(4)
2025–	Patronato	14	(0)
- * Club domestic league appearances and goals as of 17:48, 23 March 2026 (UTC)

Marcos Nahuel Enrique (born 30 December 1999) is an Argentine professional footballer who plays as a central midfielder for Patronato.

== Career ==
Enrique began his career with local side Atlético Franck, before having a three-year stint with Santa Fe FC. In 2013, following a trial, the central midfielder joined Vélez Sarsfield. Enrique was promoted into their first-team squad towards the end of the curtailed 2019–20 campaign, appearing as an unused substitute for Primera División fixtures with San Lorenzo and Arsenal de Sarandí in February 2020. Nine months later, in November, Enrique made his senior debut in the Copa Sudamericana against Deportivo Cali; replacing Federico Mancuello in the eleventh minute of stoppage time in a 2–0 victory under Mauricio Pellegrino.

On 10 March 2021, Enrique joined Primera Nacional club Instituto on a loan deal for the rest of 2021 with a purchase option. However, the deal was terminated on 27 August 2021, with Enrique instead heading to Cerro Largo, once again on a loan deal, this time until the end of 2022 including a purchase option.

== Style of play ==
Enrique started out as a goalkeeper at Atlético Franck, though soon changed to become a forward after being hit in the stomach by the ball. His father, who worked for Atlético, later transitioned him into a central midfielder.

== Career statistics ==
As of 25 November 2020.

Appearances and goals by club, season and competition
Club	Season	League			Cup		League Cup		Continental		Other		Total	
Club	Season	Division	Apps	Goals	Apps	Goals	Apps	Goals	Apps	Goals	Apps	Goals	Apps	Goals
Vélez Sarsfield	2019–20	Primera División	0	0	0	0	0	0	0	0	0	0	0	0
Vélez Sarsfield	2020–21 (Note: Soccerway counts Copa de la Liga Profesional appearances as league appearances.)	Primera División	0	0	0	0	0	0	1 (Note: Appearance(s) in the Copa Sudamericana)	0	0	0	1	0
Career total			0	0	0	0	0	0	1	0	0	0	1	0
