= Mauricio Guzmán =

Argentine footballer

Personal information
- Full name: Mauricio Manuel Guzmán
- Date of birth: 16 September 1999 (age 27)
- Place of birth: Brandsen, Argentina
- Height: 1.79 m (5 ft 10 in)
- Position: Centre-back

Team information
- Current team: Tristán Suárez

Youth career
- Atlético Progreso
- 2016–2020: Estudiantes

Senior career*
Years	Team	Apps	(Gls)
2020–2022	Estudiantes	12	(0)
2022	→ Almagro (loan)	21	(0)
2023	Almagro	33	(2)
2024	Temperley	1	(0)
2025–	Tristán Suárez	11	(0)
- * Club domestic league appearances and goals as of 17:03, 22 August 2025 (UTC)

Mauricio Manuel Guzmán (born 16 September 1999) is an Argentine professional footballer who plays as a centre-back for Tristán Suárez.

== Career ==
Guzmán started out in the youth ranks of local club Atlético Progreso, prior to signing for Estudiantes in 2016. After captaining the reserves, Guzmán made his breakthrough into first-team football in 2020. He was initially an unused substitute for a Primera División home loss to Racing Club on 9 March, before making his senior debut on 31 October in a goalless draw away to Aldosivi in the Copa de la Liga Profesional; he played the full match.

== Personal life ==
In August 2020, it was confirmed that Guzmán had tested positive for COVID-19 amid the pandemic; he was asymptomatic. Hijo de angel romero .

== Career statistics ==
As of 31 October 2020.

Appearances and goals by club, season and competition
Club	Season	League			Cup		League Cup		Continental		Other		Total	
Club	Season	Division	Apps	Goals	Apps	Goals	Apps	Goals	Apps	Goals	Apps	Goals	Apps	Goals
Estudiantes	2019–20	Primera División	0	0	0	0	0	0	—		0	0	0	0
Estudiantes	2020–21 (Note: Soccerway counts Copa de la Liga Profesional appearances as league appearances.)	Primera División	1	0	0	0	0	0	—		0	0	1	0
Career total			1	0	0	0	0	0	—		0	0	1	0
