= Nahuel Brunet =

Argentine footballer

Personal information
- Full name: Claudio Nahuel Brunet
- Date of birth: 11 July 2000 (age 26)
- Place of birth: Las Heras, Mendoza, Argentina
- Height: 1.84 m (6 ft 0 in)
- Position: Defender

Team information
- Current team: Godoy Cruz

Youth career
- Huracán Las Heras
- Gimnasia de Mendoza
- Huracán
- 2015–2018: Talleres
- 2018–2022: Godoy Cruz

Senior career*
| Years | Team | Apps | (Gls) |
| 2022– | Godoy Cruz | 3 | (0) |
| 2023 | → San Martín Tucumán (loan) | 20 | (0) |
| 2024 | → Chacarita Juniors (loan) | 13 | (0) |
| 2024–2025 | → Unión La Calera (loan) | 35 | (1) |
- * Club domestic league appearances and goals as of 25 January 2026

Claudio Nahuel Brunet (born 11 July 2000), known as Nahuel Brunet, is an Argentine footballer who plays as a defender for Godoy Cruz. Mainly a centre-back, he can also operate as a left-back.

== Club career ==
Born in Las Heras, Mendoza, Argentina, Brunet was with Huracán Las Heras, Gimnasia de Mendoza, Huracán and Talleres de Córdoba before joining Godoy Cruz. A left-footed defender, he made his professional debut in the 1–0 win against Central Córdoba de Santiago del Estero on 3 May 2022.

In 2023, Brunet was loaned out to San Martín de Tucumán. The next year, he was loaned out to Chacarita Juniors.

In the second half of 2024, Brunet moved on loan to Chile and joined Unión La Calera in the Chilean Primera División.
