= Martín Pino =

Argentine footballer

Personal information
- Date of birth: 16 March 1998 (age 28)
- Place of birth: Córdoba, Argentina
- Position: Forward

Team information
- Current team: Godoy Cruz

Youth career
- Villa Azalais
- 2015–2017: Instituto

Senior career*
| Years | Team | Apps | (Gls) |
| 2017–2024 | Instituto | 55 | (4) |
| 2022 | → Gimnasia y Tiro (loan) | 17 | (5) |
| 2023 | → Guillermo Brown (loan) | 35 | (14) |
| 2024– | Godoy Cruz | 28 | (2) |
| 2025 | → San Martín Tucumán (loan) | 30 | (8) |
- * Club domestic league appearances and goals as of 19:08, 18 March 2026 (UTC)

Martín Pino (born 16 March 1998) is an Argentine professional footballer who plays as a forward for Godoy Cruz.

== Career ==
Villa Azalais was a club where Pino spent the majority of his youth years, prior to moving to Instituto in 2015. His senior career got underway with the latter. He made nine appearances, all of which were as a substitute, in Primera B Nacional throughout 2017–18, with his debut falling on 11 December 2017 in a 3–0 defeat at the Estadio Eva Perón against Sarmiento. In June 2022, Pino was loaned out to Gimnasia y Tiro for the rest of the year.

== Career statistics ==
As of 9 February 2019.

Club statistics
| Club | Season | League | | | Cup | | Continental | | Other | | Total | |
| Club | Season | Division | Apps | Goals | Apps | Goals | Apps | Goals | Apps | Goals | Apps | Goals |
|---|---|---|---|---|---|---|---|---|---|---|---|---|
| Instituto | 2017–18 | Primera B Nacional | 9 | 0 | 0 | 0 | — | | 0 | 0 | 9 | 0 |
| Instituto | 2018–19 | Primera B Nacional | 3 | 0 | 0 | 0 | — | | 0 | 0 | 1 | 0 |
| Career total | | | 10 | 0 | 0 | 0 | — | | 0 | 0 | 10 | 0 |
