= Matías Vargas (footballer, born 1996) =

Argentine professional footballer

Personal information
- Full name: Matías Facundo Vargas
- Date of birth: 5 November 1996 (age 30)
- Place of birth: Bariloche, Argentina
- Position: Forward

Team information
- Current team: CAI

Youth career
- Estudiantes Unidos

Senior career*
Years	Team	Apps	(Gls)
2013	Estudiantes Unidos		
2013–2018	CAI	56	(13)
2018–2019	Guillermo Brown	0	(0)
2019–	CAI		
- * Club domestic league appearances and goals

Matías Facundo Vargas (born 5 November 1996) is an Argentine professional footballer who plays as a forward for CAI.

== Career ==
Estudiantes Unidos were Vargas' first team, where he played in Torneo Argentino C in 2013. A move to CAI soon followed. His club bow came in the Copa Argentina on 6 November 2013 against Guillermo Brown, with Vargas being substituted on after seventy-two minutes and going on to score a ninetieth minute winner in an away win at the Estadio Raúl Conti. Vargas scored his opening league goals for CAI against Cipolletti on 19 April 2015. In total, he appeared for them in seasons in Torneo Argentino A, Torneo Federal A and Torneo Federal B between 2013 and 2018 to take his overall statistical tally to sixty-two matches and fourteen goals.

On 30 June 2018, Vargas completed a move to Primera B Nacional side Guillermo Brown. Hugo Barrientos selected the forward for his debut on 20 July during a Copa Argentina defeat to Tigre. He departed the club on 4 January 2019, which preceded a return to CAI of the Torneo Regional Federal Amateur.

== Career statistics ==
As of 27 January 2019.

Club statistics
Club	Season	League			Cup		Continental		Other		Total	
Club	Season	Division	Apps	Goals	Apps	Goals	Apps	Goals	Apps	Goals	Apps	Goals
CAI	2013–14	Torneo Argentino A	2	0	2	1	—		1 (Note: Appearance(s) in the Torneo Argentino A play-offs)	0	5	1
CAI	2014	Torneo Federal A	0	0	3	0	—		0	0	3	0
CAI	2015	Torneo Federal A	23	3	0	0	—		0	0	23	3
CAI	Total		25	3	5	1	—		1	0	31	4
Guillermo Brown	2018–19	Primera B Nacional	0	0	1	0	—		0	0	1	0
Career total			25	3	6	1	—		1	0	32	4
