= Kimberley de Mar del Plata =

Kimberley
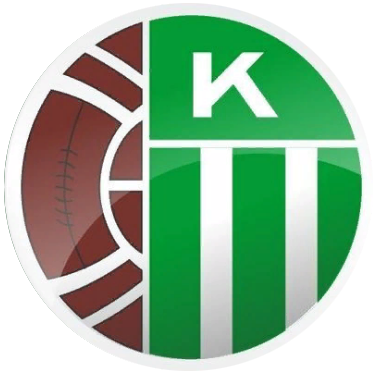
- Full name: Club Atlético Kimberley
- Nickname(s): Dragón
- Founded: 6 July 1921; 104 years ago
- Ground: José Antonio Valle, Mar del Plata, Buenos Aires Province
- Chairman: Luciano Mignini
- Manager: Mariano Mignini
- League: Torneo Federal A
- 2023: 1° of Zona D
Home colours

Club Atlético Kimberley, also known as Kimberley de Mar del Plata, is an Argentine sports club based in the city of Mar del Plata in Buenos Aires Province. Founded on 6 July 1921, Kimberley is mostly known for its football team, which currently plays in Torneo Federal A, the regionalised 3rd division of the Argentine league system.

Other sports practised at Kimberley are basketball, swimming, futsal, roller skating, taekwondo, among others. Kimberley is considered one of the most important clubs in Mar del Plata, along with Peñarol, Quilmes, Aldosivi and Kimberley's archrivals, San Lorenzo de Mar del Plata.

== History ==
In football, Kimberley played in the top division, Primera División on six occasions, with a 5-0 win over Independiente in 1970 as one of the club's greatest achievements.

Kimberley gained world fame during the 1978 FIFA World Cup when France had to wear Kimberley's jerseys for their match against Hungary in Mar del Plata, after both teams arrived with only their white change strips.
